= Vachan (1938 film) =

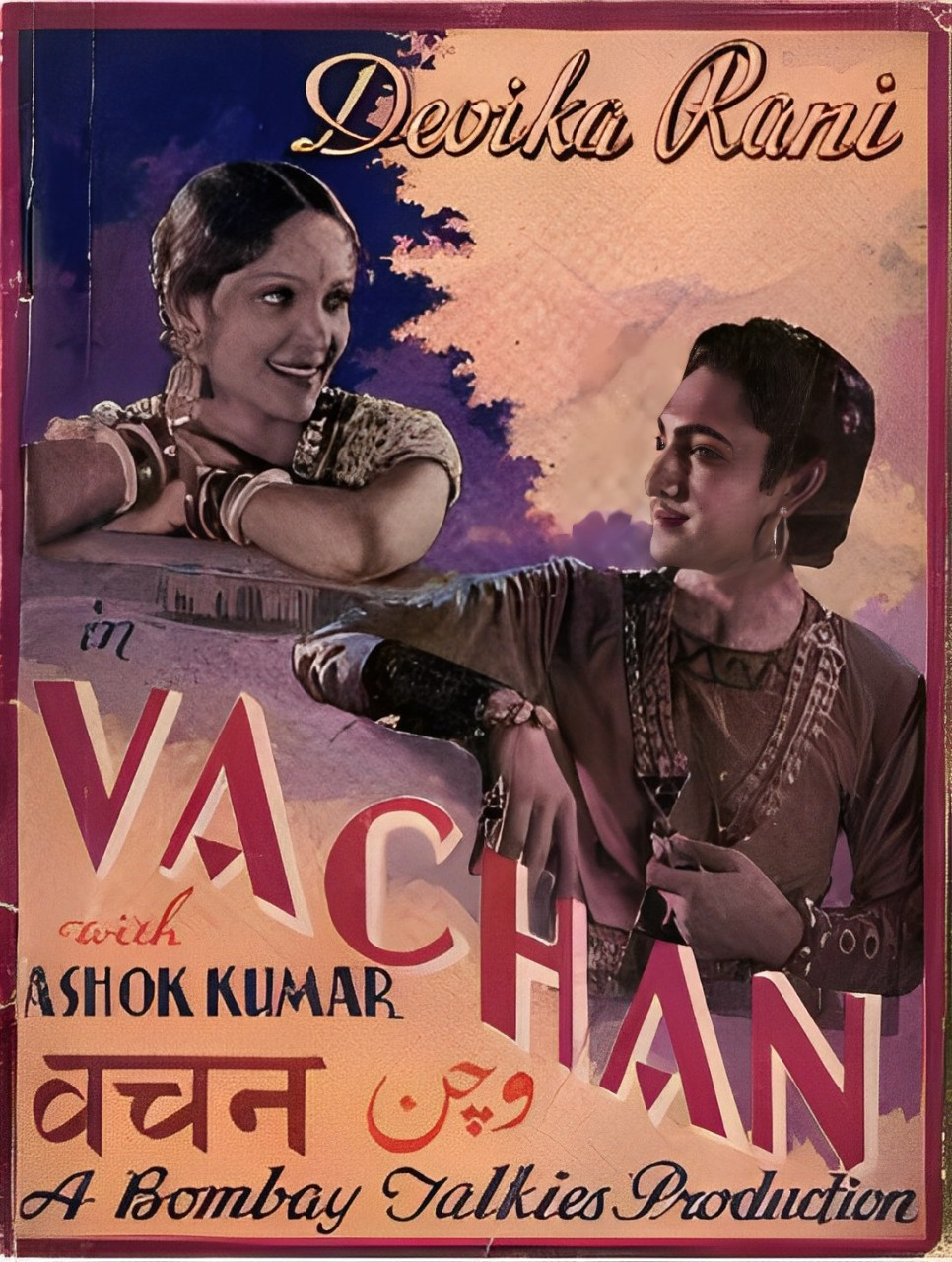
- Directed by: Franz Osten
- Written by: Sharadindu Bandyopadhyay
- Produced by: Bombay Talkies
- Starring: Devika Rani; Ashok Kumar; Mumtaz Ali; Meera
- Cinematography: Joseph Wirsching; Pareenja
- Music by: Saraswati Devi
- Production company: Bombay Talkies
- Distributed by: Ramniklal Mohanlal and Co., Bombay
- Release date: 1938
- Running time: 144 minutes
- Country: British India
- Language: Hindi

Vachan (Hindi: वचन, The Promise) is a 1938 costume drama Hindi film directed by Franz Osten. The regular Bombay Talkies writer, Niranjan Pal, walked out of the Bombay Talkies production team after an altercation with Himanshu Rai in 1936. Saradindu Bandyopadhyay, a famous writer known also for creating Byomkesh Bakshi, replaced Pal in the story department, writing for films like Nirmala and Vachan in 1938 and Durga in 1939. The screenplay was by Agha Jani Kashmiri, with dialogues and lyrics by J. S. Kashyap. The music was composed by Saraswati Devi aided by J. S. Kashyap. The film starred Devika Rani and Ashok Kumar, a popular pair from Bombay Talkies who worked in seven films together. Devika Rani remained the bigger star with Kumar's name being "over-shadowed" in the credit rolls, as well as the publicity of the film.

Rajendranath, a popular comedian of Indian cinema, began his acting career in Vachan. The rest of the cast included Meera, Mumtaz Ali, Agha Jani, M. Nazir, Kashmiri, Maya Devi and Kamta Prasad.

Devika Rani played the role of a princess in this costume drama film.

== Cast ==
- Ashok Kumar
- Devika Rani
- Meera
- Mumtaz Ali
- Pithavala
- Kamta Prasad
- Maya Devi
- Saroj Borker
- Aga Jani
- Kashmiri
- M. Nazir

== Reception ==
Meera and Devika Rani in Vachan, from Filmindia, 1938

The film was released on 19 August 1938 at Roxy Talkies, Bombay. According to Baburao Patel of Filmindia magazine, the screenplay was too simple, like a "nursery" story, and "ended before the interval". The photography by Wirsching and Pareenja was stated to be consistently good, even "excellent" at places. The actress Meera was singled out for her acting, claiming it to be a "better performance" than Devika's. Osten's technical direction was cited as clever, but Patel stated that Osten was unable to capture the "Indian" spirit of the play. The film was referred to as a success in the Studio Close-Ups section of the same issue of Filmindia.

== Soundtrack ==
Music composed by Saraswati Devi with lyrics by J. S. Kashyap. The singers were Ashok Kumar, Devika Rani, Vimla, Meera and Lalita.

=== Songlist ===
#	Title	Singer
1	"Phoolo Tum Aaj Khushi Se Phoolo"	Ashok Kumar
2	"Naval Naveli Naari Hum Kunwari Baari"	Devika Rani, Meera, Vimla, Lalita
3	"Ham Pinjare Ki Maina"	Meera
4	"Aa Re Panchhi Pyare"	Devika Rani
5	"Baisakh, Fagun Wa Chaith"	Ashok Kumar
6	"Ban Ki Yeh Chidiya Chidiya Bani Ab Pinjre Ki Maina"	Devika Rani, Meera
7	"Hriday Hai Kahin Aur Jaan Hai Kahin"	Ashok Kumar
8	"Janoon Tere Sajan Ki Ghatiyan"	Devika Rani, Meera
9	"Namo Namo Hai Veer"	Devika Rani
