= Prem Kahani (1937 film) =

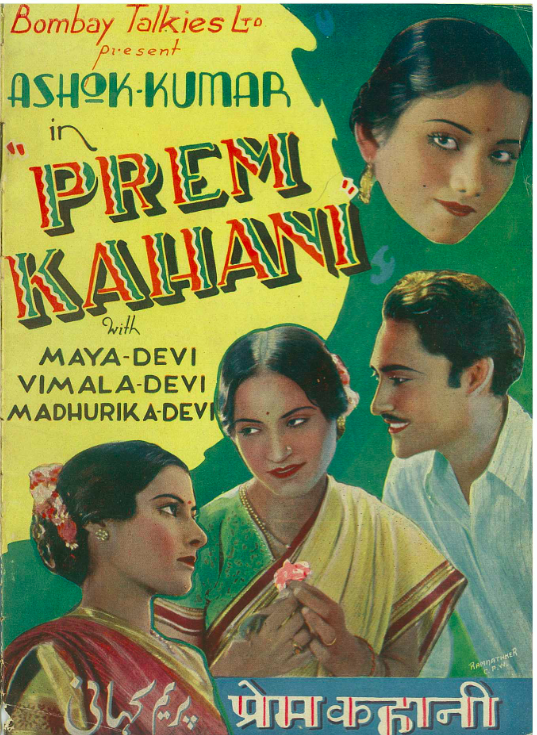
- Song book cover
- Directed by: Franz Osten
- Written by: Niranjan Pal
- Produced by: Himanshu Rai
- Starring: Ashok Kumar; N.M. Joshi; Mayadevi; Vimala Devi; Madhurika Devi
- Cinematography: Joseph Wirsching
- Edited by: Dattaram Pai
- Music by: Saraswati Devi
- Production company: Bombay Talkies
- Release date: 1937
- Running time: 87 minutes
- Country: India
- Language: Hindi

Prem Kahani

Prem Kahani (English: "Love Story") is a 1937 Indian Hindi film, by Franz Osten and starring Ashok Kumar, N.M. Joshi, Mayadevi, Vimala Devi, Madhurika Devi and others.

== Plot ==
Two widowed neighbours thwart a love match when they try to arrange marriages for their respective children.

== Cast ==
- N. M.Joshi as Father
- Bilqis as Mother
- Aloka as Ratanbai, the daughter
- M.Nazir as Chandrakanta
- Kamta Prasad as Priest
- Tarabai Solanki as Heera
- Saroj Borkar as Shanti
- Maya Devi as Maya
- Ashok Kumar as Jagat
- P.F.Pithawala as Bhagwandas
- Vimala Devi as Ramla
- Chandraprabha as Ms. Prabha
- Manohar Ghatwai as Motilal
- Sunita Devi as Ms. Indira
- Mumtaz Ali as Mr. Sharma
- Madhurika Devi as Usha
- Ahteramuddin

== Production ==
Bombay Talkies produced two films in 1937, Jeevan Prabhat and Prem Kahani. This is also Bombay Talkies' eighth film since the studio was founded in 1934.

Khorshed Minocher-Homji aka Saraswati Devi, one of the few female composers of Hindi cinema, composed music for this film.

Writer Niranjan Pal's original title for the English-language story and screenplay was Touchstone or Marriage Market, indicating a shorthand version of the film's theme. The verse that Pal uses as a mood reference for one of the songs in the film is from Arthur Ryder's 1912 translation of Kalidasa’s Kumarasambhava or The Birth of the War-God.
