= Jeevan Prabhat =

1937 Hindi film by Franz Osten

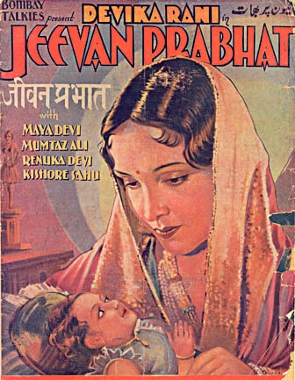
- Film poster
- Directed by: Franz Osten
- Written by: Niranjan Pal (screenplay)
- Produced by: Himanshu Rai
- Starring: Devika Rani; Mumtaz Ali; Kishore Sahu; Renuka Devi
- Cinematography: Joseph Wirsching
- Music by: Saraswati Devi
- Production company: Bombay Talkies
- Distributed by: Ramniklal Mohanlal and Co., Bombay
- Release date: 1937
- Running time: 144 minutes
- Country: British India
- Language: Hindi

Jeevan Prabhat (Dawn Of Life) is a 1937 Hindi film social drama, produced by Bombay Talkies and directed by Franz Osten. The music director was Saraswati Devi with lyrics and dialogues by J. S. Casshyap. The screenplay was by Niranjan Pal. The film's "star value" was Devika Rani, with Kishore Sahu making his debut as an actor in the film. The cast included another debutant, Renuka Devi, with Mumtaz Ali, Maya Devi and M. Nazir.

The film deals with the social evils of the caste system, and remarriage. Uma is sent back to her father's home after her husband remarries, as she is unable to bear children. Her renewed friendship with a childhood friend, Ramu, a Harijan, brings censure and misunderstanding from her husband and society.

== Plot ==
Set in a village, a young Brahmin couple Nandlal (Mumtaz Ali) and Uma (Devika Rani) are unable to have any children. The husband plans to take another wife, Padma. Ramu (Kishore Sahu) belongs to the potters family, where Uma normally spent most of her time before marriage. The friendship has been frowned upon as Ramu is from the Harijan caste. Nandlal sends Uma to her father's house, where she renews her friendship with Ramu. Nandlal sees Uma talking to Ramu (Kishore Sahu). While at her father's house, Uma discovers that she is pregnant. Misunderstandings arise when Nandlal gets suspicious about Uma and Ramu, but all is set right by Padma, Nandlal's second wife. She clears Uma's name, and gets Nandlal and Uma together before walking out of their lives.

== Cast ==
- Devika Rani as Uma
- Mumtaz Ali as Nandlal
- Kishore Sahu as Ramu
- Renuka Devi
- Chandraprabha
- Maya Devi
- Vimala Devi
- Aloka Aloka
- Tarabai Solanki
- Saroj Borkar
- Kamta Prasad
- P.F. Pithawala
- M. Nazir
- N. M. Joshi
- G.S. Vaishampayan

== Review ==
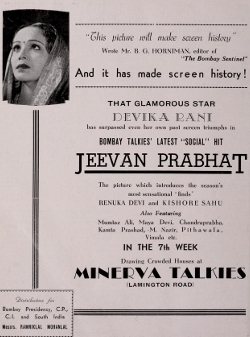
Ad from the cine-magazine Filmindia, December 1937

Jeevan Prabhat was released on 2 November 1937, at Minerva Talkies, Bombay. Baburao Patel, the Filmindia editor, in his review of December 1937, called it Osten's "better work than ever before". Saraswati Devi's music composition and Wirsching's cinematography were praised, as was Niranjan Pal's screenplay, "a good story with plenty of entertainment". Devika Rani was hailed for scoring "another triumphant". Renuka Devi was praised for her looks but criticised for her acting. Kishore Sahu was stated to be a "big disappointment".

The audience reception was good with the film running for over 17 weeks in Bombay, while doing good business in the rest of the country too, becoming a commercial success.

== Production ==
The film starred Kishore Sahu with Devika Rani, who was cited as a "bankable star". Bombay Talkies was producing a large quantity of films in a short period of time. Jeevan Prabhat was completed in two months, while Achhut Kanya was made in six weeks. In a little over four years, Osten had directed about sixteen films for Bombay Talkies.

== Soundtrack ==
The music was composed by Saraswati Devi, with lyrics by J. S. Casshyap. The singers were Devika Rani, Balwant Singh, Mumtaz Ali, Saroj Borkar and Saraswati Devi.

=== Song list ===
#	Title	Singer
1	"Tum Meri Tum Mere Sajan"	Balwant Singh, Devika Rani
2	"Bane Chandni Ka Palna Jhoole Chanda Sa Lalna"	Devika Rani
3	"Ek Chandi Ka Hai Mandir Sone Ki Murat Sundar"	Mumtaz Ali, Devika Rani
4	"Hori Aayi Re Kanha Bruj Ke Basiya"	Saraswati Devi
5	"Kyun Janam Diya Bhagwan Gar Ro Ro Ke Marna Tha"	Renuka Devi
6	"Mera Lalna Jhoole Palna"	Devika Rani, Saroj Borkar
7	"Mujhe Pehchante Ho Hanh Mujhe Tum Jaant Ho"	Devika Rani, Mumtaz Ali
8	"Un Motorwalon Ke Yahan"	Devika Rani, Balwant Singh
9	"Chale Thay Bade Dushman-e-Jaan Bankar"	Balwant Singh
10	"Chal Chal Re Chakwa Ghar Ghar Ghar"	
