= Izzat (1937 film) =

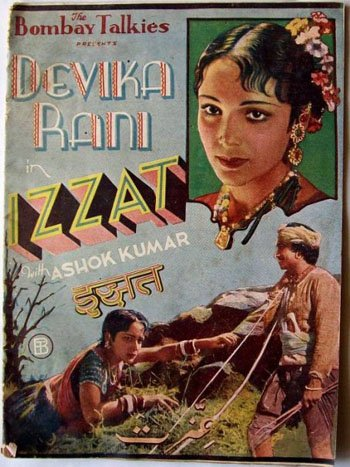
- Film poster
- Directed by: Franz Osten
- Written by: Dr. G. Nundy; Niranjan Pal (screenplay)
- Produced by: Himanshu Rai
- Starring: Devika Rani; Ashok Kumar; Mumtaz Ali; Madhurika
- Cinematography: Joseph Wirsching
- Music by: Saraswati Devi
- Production company: Bombay Talkies
- Release date: 1937
- Running time: 144 minutes
- Country: British India
- Language: Hindi

Izzat (1937), full movie

Izzat (transl. Honour) is a 1937 Hindi film social drama, directed by Franz Osten. The film was produced by Himanshu Rai for Bombay Talkies. The credit roll of Izzat attributes the story to Dr. G. Nundy, adapted for screen by J. Nundy. The screenplay was by Niranjan Pal, who handled the story section of Bombay Talkies. J. S. Casshyap wrote the songs and dialogues and was assisted in dialogue direction by S. I. Hassan. The music was composed by Saraswati Devi, with actor Mumtaz Ali doubling as the choreographer. The film starred Ashok Kumar with Devika Rani in the lead, while the rest of the cast included Mumtaz Ali, Madhurika, Kamtaprasad, Chandraprabha, and P. F. Pithawala.

The film involves two "warring clans", the Marathas and the Bhil tribe, along with a young couple in love, much in "a Romeo and Juliet" style story setting.

== Plot ==
The Marathas and the Bhils have been living in peace and mutual respect for a period of twenty-five years, due to the efforts of the two chiefs, the Maratha Patil and the Bhil chief Maruti. The Maratha Patil's son died at a young age and his nephew, Balaji, is being considered by the Patil to replace him. However, Balaji is against any sort of cordial relationship with the Bhils, and opposes any favourable treatment given to them. This upsets the Patil, who falls ill. He realises the consequence of Balaji succeeding him and regrets his decision made earlier to that effect. He wants to send a message to the Diwan (Chief Minister) that Balaji should not become the Patil following his death. The letter is intercepted by Balaji. The old chief dies, making Balaji the new Patil.

The story then focuses on the animosity that develops between the two clans. Balaji usurps the Bhils land and makes them work for him. Maruti, the chief of the Bhils and Kanhayia's (Ashok Kumar) father asks the Bhils to leave. The clash between the two clans turns Kanhaiya into a bandit, who is then hunted by the Marathas. When Balaji tries to molest Radha (Devika Rani), Kanhaiya's beloved, Kanhaiya kills him and lets himself be captured by the Maratha police as he does not want any further atrocities against his tribe. He is sentenced to be hanged. Radha comes to meet him in the jail but dies. Kanhaiya goes to his hanging being hailed as a martyr.

== Cast ==
- Devika Rani as Radha
- Ashok Kumar as Karangopal
- Kamta Prasad
- Chandraprabha
- P. F. Pithawala
- Mumtaz Ali
- Sunita Devi
- N. M. Joshi
- Ahteramuddin
- Vimala
- Madhurika
- H. S. Naik
- Manohar
- M. Nazir
- Fatehsingh
- Y. G. Takle

== Soundtrack ==
Saraswati Devi was the music director, with lyrics by J. S. Casshyap. The singers were Devika Rani, Ashok Kumar, Mumtaz Ali and Sunita Devi.

=== Song list ===
#	Title	Singer
1	"Bharne De Mohe Nir"	Ashok Kumar, Devika Rani
2	"Matawale Nainon Wali Ghungharale Balon Wali"	Ashok Kumar, Devika Rani
3	"Piya Aavan Kahe Gaye Ni Aaye"	Mumtaz Ali, Sunita Devi
4	"Kit Jaoge Kanhaiya Man Ke Basaiya"	Devika Rani
5	"Nagari Laagi Sooni Sooni Jabse Gaye"	Devika Rani
6	"Prem Dor Mein Baandhe Hamein Kit Chale Gaye"	Devika Rani, Ashok Kumar
