= Nirmala (1938 film) =

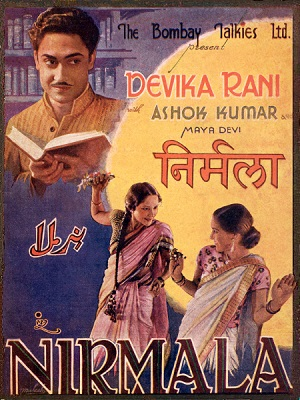
- Nirmala
- Directed by: Franz Osten
- Written by: Dialogue Director: J.S. Casshyap
- Produced by: Himansu Rai, Devika Rani
- Starring: Devika Rani; Ashok Kumar
- Cinematography: Josef Wirsching
- Edited by: Dattaram Pai
- Music by: Composer: Saraswati Devi Lyricist: J.S. Casshyap Sound Recording: S.B. Vacha
- Production company: Bombay Talkies
- Release date: 15 April 1938
- Country: India
- Language: Hindi

Nirmala (Hindi निर्मला, immaculate, virtuous) is a 1938 Indian Hindi-language social drama film directed by Franz Osten and produced by Bombay Talkies.

== Cast ==
- Devika Rani as Nirmala
- Ashok Kumar as Ramdas
- Maya Devi as Vimla
- Kamta Prasad as Professor
- Mumtaz Ali
- P.F.Pithawala as Rajanikant, Nirmala's Father
- M. Nazir as Loknath
- Saroj Borkar as Maya Devi, Nirmala's mother
- Yusuf Sulehman as Brajnath
- P.R.Joshi as Gehni
- Haridas
- Y.G.Takle as The Inspector
- S.Gulab as Loknath's mother
- Bhim as Young Loknath
- Vipin Mehta
- Nzeer Bedi
- Pratima as Ramdas's Mother
- Meera as Beggar Girl
- Gulbadan as Young Nirmala
- Balwant Singh
- Swarupa
- Ehsan as Young Ramdas/Ramu
- Tarabai Solanki

Dance Director

- Mumtaz Ali
