= Savitri (1937 film) =

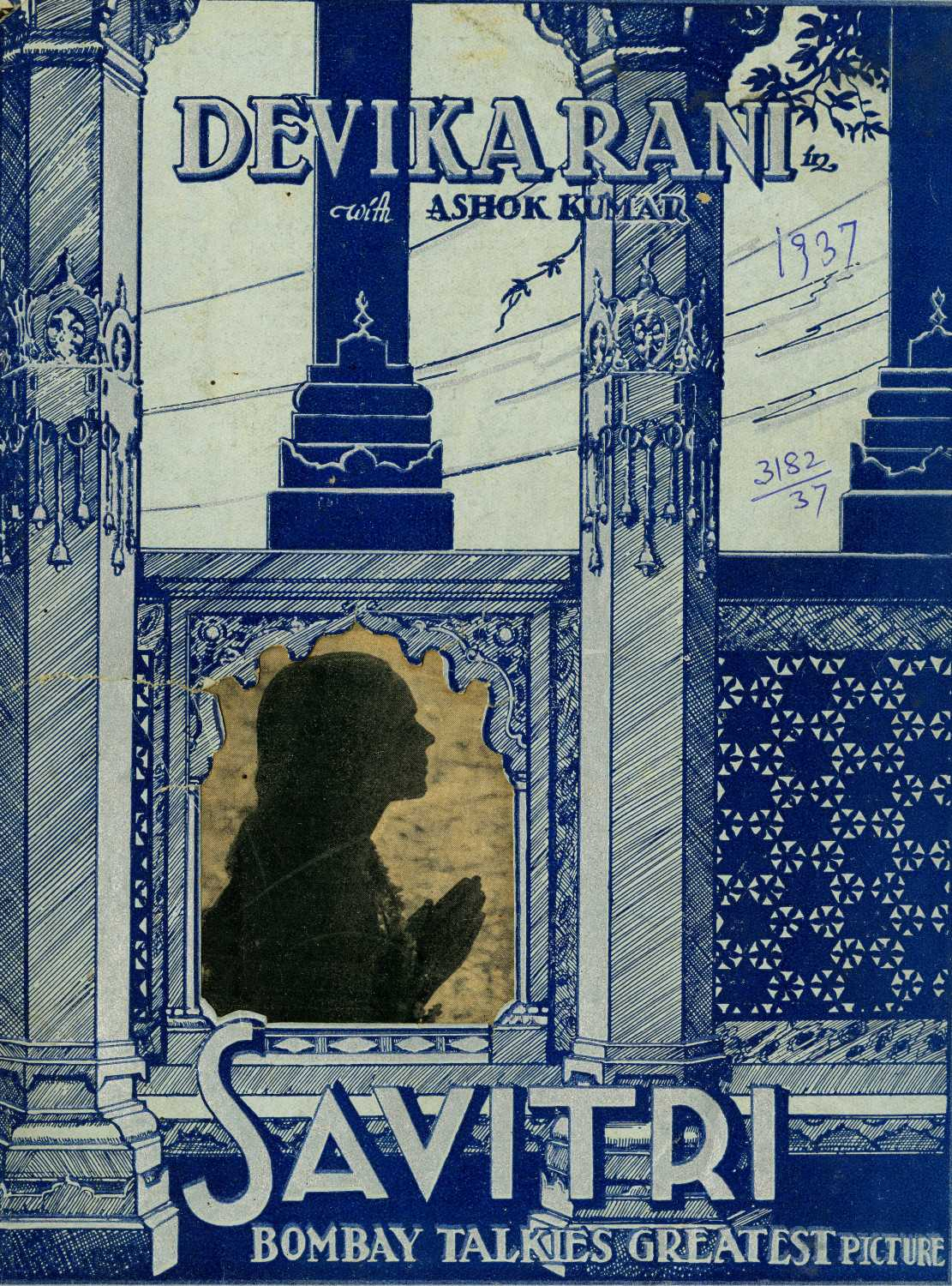
- Film poster
- Directed by: Franz Osten
- Written by: Niranjan Pal; J. S. Casshyap (dialogue)
- Produced by: Bombay Talkies
- Starring: Devika Rani; Ashok Kumar; Maya Devi; Mumtaz Ali
- Cinematography: Joseph Wirsching
- Music by: Saraswati Devi
- Production company: Bombay Talkies
- Distributed by: Ramniklal Mohanlal and Co., Bombay
- Release date: 1937
- Running time: 136 minutes
- Country: India
- Language: Hindi

Savitri is a 1937 Indian Hindi-language mythological film directed by Franz Osten. It was adapted from a story in the Mahabharata by Niranjan Pal, with dialogues by J. S. Casshyap. The cinematographer was Joseph Wirsching. Saraswati Devi composed the music. According to Garga, Savitri was the "only mythological" produced by Himanshu Rai for Bombay Talkies, who were known for making "realist reform dramas". Ashok Kumar and Devika Rani played the lead roles supported by Maya Devi, Saroj Borkar, Mumtaz Ali, and Sunita Devi.

The film is based on an incident from the epic Mahabharata and tells the story of Savitri and Satyavan, played by Devika Rani and Ashok Kumar. Savitri persists in getting the god of death, Yama, to revoke her husband Satyavan's death.

== Plot ==
Savitri is born as a boon from the Sun God and thus shares a blood-relation with Karna as a sister, to Ashwapati, the King of Madra and his wife Malawi. Savitri meets and falls in love with Satyavan, the son of the blind King Dumatasena. Dumtasena's minister has taken over his kingdom and exiled the king, who now lives in the forest. When Savitri decides to marry Satyavan, the sage Narada advises against it, as according to the planetary charts, Satyavan will die a year following their marriage. However, Savitri insists on going ahead, ready to take on Yama the God of death. A year later when Savitri sees Yama carrying Satyavan's soul she follows and discourses with him, while continuing her pursuit. Finally, Yama tells her she can ask three boons of him except for Satyavan's life. The boons Savitri asks for are: sight for her father-in-law and restoration of his kingdom, her father should be granted a hundred sons, and last, she be granted a hundred sons. Yama gives in to her request, thereby restoring Satyavan's life. Her father-in-law's sight is restored and he learns of the death of his usurper.

== Cast ==
- Devika Rani as Savitri
- Ashok Kumar as Karan
- Kamta Prasad
- Chandraprabha
- Sunita Devi
- Vimala Devi
- Maya Devi
- Sushila
- Aloka
- Madhurika Devi
- Tarabai Solanki
- Kamta Prasad
- Mumtaz Ali
- P. F. Pithawala
- M. Nazir

== Soundtrack ==
The music was composed by Saraswati Devi with lyrics by J. S. Casshyap. The singers were Devika Rani, Ashok Kumar, Sushila Bhiwandkar, Chandraprabha, and P. F. Pithawala.

=== Songlist ===
#	Title	Singer
1	Uttho Uttho Begi Uttho Sajanwa	Devika Rani
2	Surya Wahi Chandra Wahi	Ashok Kumar
3	Koi Aandhi Ko Rok Sake Rok Le	Sushila Bhiwandkar
4	Surya Kiran Navjivan Laayi	Chandraprabha
5	Saath Saath Jaayenge	Chandraprabha
6	Wahan Der Sahi Andher Nahin	P. F. Pithawala
7	Yo Suno Geet Sangeet Manohar	Ashok Kumar
8	Devi Devi Sur Nar Muni	
9	Dhanya Hua Dhany Hua Tav Kaaran Aaj	
10	Jab Koyal Ku Ku Karti Kya Veena Bhi Sur Bharti	Sushila Bhiwandkar
11	Jal Bharan Aayi Gujariya	Ashok Kumar
12	Hari Jab Jab Bhagat Par Bheer Padi	P. F. Pithawala

== Savitri In Indian cinema ==
There were about thirty-four versions of the Savitri Satyavan films made. One of the earliest was the film Savitri produced in 1913 by Dadasaheb Phalke. The 1923 version, Savitri also called Satyavan Savitri, was an Italian co-production directed by Giorgio Mannini and J. J. Madan produced by Madan Theatres Ltd. and Cines. Savitri (1933) was the first film produced by East India Film Company. Directed by C. Pullaiah, it received an Honorary Certificate at the Venice Film Festival.
