= Bhabhi (1938 film) =

1938 film

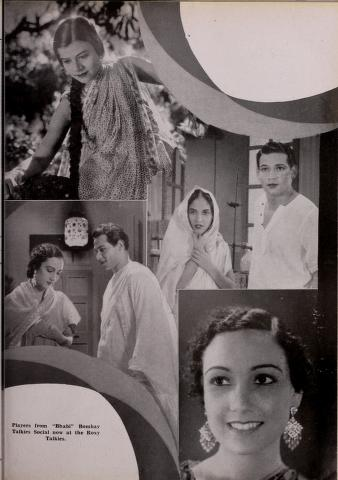
- Screenshots of Bhabhi from Filmindia January 1939
- Directed by: Franz Osten
- Written by: Sharadindu Bandyopadhyay
- Produced by: Bombay Talkies
- Starring: P. Jairaj; Renuka Devi; Maya Devi; V. H. Desai
- Cinematography: Joseph Wirsching; Pareenja
- Music by: Saraswati Devi
- Production company: Bombay Talkies
- Distributed by: Ramniklal Mohanlal and Co., Bombay
- Release date: 1938
- Running time: 144 minutes
- Country: British India
- Language: Hindi

Bhabhi, 1938

Bhabhi (Sister-in-Law) is a 1938 social family drama Hindi film directed by Franz Osten. The film was based on a Bengali novel written by Sharadindu Bandyopadhyay called "Bisher Dhoan" ("বিষের ধোঁয়া"). Bandyopadhyay was a famous Bengali novelist and short story writer also known as the creator of the fictional detective Byomkesh Bakshi. The cinematographers were Wirsching and Pareenja. Dialogues and lyrics by J. S. Casshyap. V. H. Desai, the comedian, got his "big break" in Bhabhi when he joined Bombay Talkies. He became popular as the nervous father of the heroine Renuka Devi. S. N. Tripathi started his acting with a small role in the film. The film had the new found Renuka Devi in the lead.

The cast included P. Jairaj, Maya Devi as the young widow, with V. H. Desai, Rama Shukal, Meera, M. Nazir, P. F. Pithawala.

The film is family social drama, which deals with the issue of young widows. It put a special focus on the Indian society's attitude towards them, and society's bigoted approach to "man- woman relationships".

== Plot ==
Kishore (P. Jairaj) is a morally respectable man. When his friend is dying, he extracts a promise from Kishore to look after his distraught young wife Bimala (Maya Devi). Bimala is alone in the world and has no family to go to. Considering her to be his sister-in-law (Bhabhi), Kishore brings Bimala to his house. Though their relationship is that of a brother and sister, it is frowned upon by society. Kishore does not allow society's disapproval to affect them. He falls in love with his new neighbour Renu (Renuka Devi). Renu lives with her father, who appears as a shaky and nervy man. Anupam (Rama Shukal) also wants to marry Renu as she's wealthy. Bela (Meera) Anupam's cousin develops a crush on Kishore. Anupam causes problems for Renu and Kishore by starting gossip bout Bimala and Kishore. The story follows that line till all misunderstandings are cleared and Renu and Kishore can marry.

== Cast ==
- Renuka Devi as Renu, the neighbour, sympathetic to and in love with Kishore
- P.Jairaj as Kishore, the young man who looks after his dead friend's widow
- Meera as Bela, the young society girl
- Maya Devi as Bimala, the young widow left in Kishore's care.
- M. Nazir
- P.F.Pithawala as Kishore's Professor from college days
- V.H.Desai as Renu's nervous dithering father
- Gyan Mukherjee
- Rama Shukul as Anupam, the main villain who puts obstacles in Renu and Kishore's love story
- Agajani Kashmiree
- Saroj Borkar
- Pratima
- Vimala Devi
- Ranibala
- Lalita Debulkar
- K.B.Mangale
- D.V.Surve

== Review and Reception ==
The film was released on 17 December 1938 at Bombay's Roxy Talkies. Renuka Devi's performance was cited as "commendable". Baburao Patel, editor of the cine-magazine Filmindia, in his review of Bhabhi in the January 1938 issue, called Renuka a "remarkable discovery" with a performance "that has distinctive grace" and that "Bombay Talkies have found another Devika (Rani)". V. H. Desai as the "nervous father" was "superb". Rama Shukal was stated to be a good addition to Indian cinema. Jairaj's acting came in for praise for its expression of "suppressed rage" and "grief". The direction was praised for being "subtle", "clever" and that Osten had "excelled himself".

The film was claimed to be a "tremendous success" by Patel of Filmindia in his February 1939 issue. Renuka Devi was hailed as a "star" and her success was cited as a "welcome sign of better class ladies taking up the film career".

== Soundtrack ==
One of the memorable monsoon songs "Jhuki Aayi Re Badariya Sawan Ki" is cited as an evergreen classic. The music was composed by Saraswati Devi, for whom the film was a musical hit. The singers were Renuka Devi, Meera, Saroj Borkar, S. N. Tripathi.

=== Song list ===
#	Title	Singer
1	"Jhukee Aayi Re Badariya Sawan Ki"	Renuka Devi
2	"Aaj Toh Anand Bhaye Krishna Aaye"	Renuka Devi
3	"Ban Titli Ban Titli Main Phool Phool Par Jaati"	Meera
4	"Ghar Aaye Sajan Laut Aaye Kun Bahane Pir Bulayein"	Renuka Devi
5	"Hum Qaidi Haan Qaidi Tan Man Qaidi"	Renuka Devi
6	"Man Murakh Kyun Diwana"	Saroj Borkar
7	"Matwali Koyaliya Bole Ku Ku"	Meera
8	"Nahin Dekh Behtar Sataana"	S. N. Tripathi
9	"Patta Toota Daal Se"	
10	"Phool Sajan Tum Mero Man Bhnwara"	Renuka Devi
11	"Tai Tair Ri Jeevan Naiya"	
12	"Phool Bagiya Tum Aana Bhanwara Rain Bhaye"	Meera
13	"Nanhi Nanhi Bundiya Meh Ra Barse Jiya R Trse"	Renuka devi
