= Pratima (film) =

- Poster
- Directed by: Paidi Jairaj
- Produced by: M. I. Dharamsey
- Starring: Dilip Kumar; Swarnalata; Mumtaz Ali; Shah Nawaz
- Music by: Arun Kumar Mukherjee
- Production company: Bombay Talkies
- Release date: 14 December 1945
- Country: India
- Language: Hindi

Pratima is a 1945 Indian Hindustani-language movie directed by Paidi Jairaj. The film was produced by M. I. Dharamsey under Bombay Talkies and was the directorial debut of P. Jairaj. The film stars Dilip Kumar, Swaran Lata, Mumtaz Ali, Shah Nawaz and Mukri. Swarn Lata was cast following her big success the preceding year, Rattan (1944). Mukri was cast in his debut role by Devika Rani, who is stated to have "liked his smile and off-screen enthusiasm". The music direction was by Arun Kumar Mukherjee and the lyricist was Narendra Sharma.
