= Azad (1940 film) =

- Directed by: N. R. Acharya
- Written by: Saradindu Bandopadhyay; J.S. Kashyap
- Starring: Leela Chitnis; Ashok Kumar; Hansa Wadkar
- Music by: Composer: Saraswati Devi, Ramchandra Pal
- Production company: Bombay Talkies
- Release date: 1940
- Country: India
- Language: Hindi

Azad is a 1940 social Hindi movie directed by N. R. Acharya and produced by Bombay Talkies.

== Cast ==
- Leela Chitnis
- Ashok Kumar
- Hansa Wadkar
- Mumtaz Ali
- Nazir Bedi
- Rama Shukal
- Nana Palsikar
- D. V. Surve
- Ramchandra Pal
