= Janmabhoomi (1936 film) =

- Janmabhoomi
- Directed by: Franz Osten
- Written by: Niranjan Pal; J. S. Kashyap (dialogue)
- Produced by: Himanshu Rai
- Starring: Devika Rani; Ashok Kumar
- Cinematography: Josef Wirsching
- Music by: Saraswati Devi
- Production company: Bombay Talkies
- Release date: 1936
- Country: India
- Language: Hindi

Janmabhoomi

Janmabhoomi (English: Land of Birth) is a 1936 Indian Hindi-language film directed by Franz Osten and starring Devika Rani and Ashok Kumar in the lead roles. Music of the film was by Saraswati Devi, who had worked extensively with Bombay Talkies.

== Synopsis ==
Protima Devi (Devika Rani) is in love with Dr. Ajoy Kumar Ghosh (Ashok Kumar), whom she has already accepted as her husband even though they are not married. Ajoy is living in a village where he is the only doctor.

Inspired by the death of a friend, Ajoy decides to devote his life serving his native village (a metaphor for serving the country). Dedicated to the cause, Ajoy decides to renounce all worldly pleasures, including his love. Protima gets a rude shock when Ajoy writes to her urging her to forget him. Determined not to give up easily, she sets off to the village, where she discovers that Ajoy is out to improve the lives of the villagers.

Ajoy attempts at enlightening the villagers against blind faith and achieving unity by breaking down caste barriers brings him in direct conflict with the old order, represented by the hedonistic zamindar, his assistant Sanatan (P. F. Pithawala), the village priest, and the village moneylender. Together, the four band together to discredit Ajoy in the eyes of the villagers.

After several failed attempts, the wily Sanatan dreams up a diabolical conspiracy to get rid of the vacillating Zamindar and replace him with his drunkard, hedonistic nephew (Mumtaz Ali), who will prove more pliable. The zamindar is poisoned under circumstances that point to Dr. Ajoy's involvement, resulting in his imprisonment.

The doctor's report establishes that the Zamindar died due to arsenic poisoning. Further investigation reveals that Sanatan had purchased arsenic from a chemist shop in a nearby town. Suspicion automatically turns to Sanatan, who is apprehended. Under interrogation he confesses to his crime. Ajoy is released with his name and reputation intact, free to carry on with his reforming ways.

== Cast ==
Main Cast

- Devika Rani as Protima
- Ashok Kumar as Ramchandra
- Kamta Prasad as Panditji
- Chandraprabha as Pagli
- Sunita Devi
- Mumtaz Ali
- P. F. Pithawala as Sanatan
- Pramila

Supported by

- Jhaverbhai Kaiser as The Zamindar
- N. M.Joshi
- Ahteramuddin
- D. A. Kamat
- H. S. Naik
- Madhurika
- Khosla
- Ishrat
- Talwar

== Legacy ==
Released during the Indian independence movement, Janmabhoomi was the first patriotic movie in the history of Hindi cinema.

It was also the first ever Hindi movie to have an explicitly nationalistic song: "Jai Jai Janani Janmabhoomi" (Hail the land of our birth), written by Jamuna Swarup Cassyap. The song was extremely popular song in its era and inspired freedom struggles.

A tune from the film was utilised by the BBC as a signature tune for its "Indian News Service".
