= Anjaan (1940 film) =

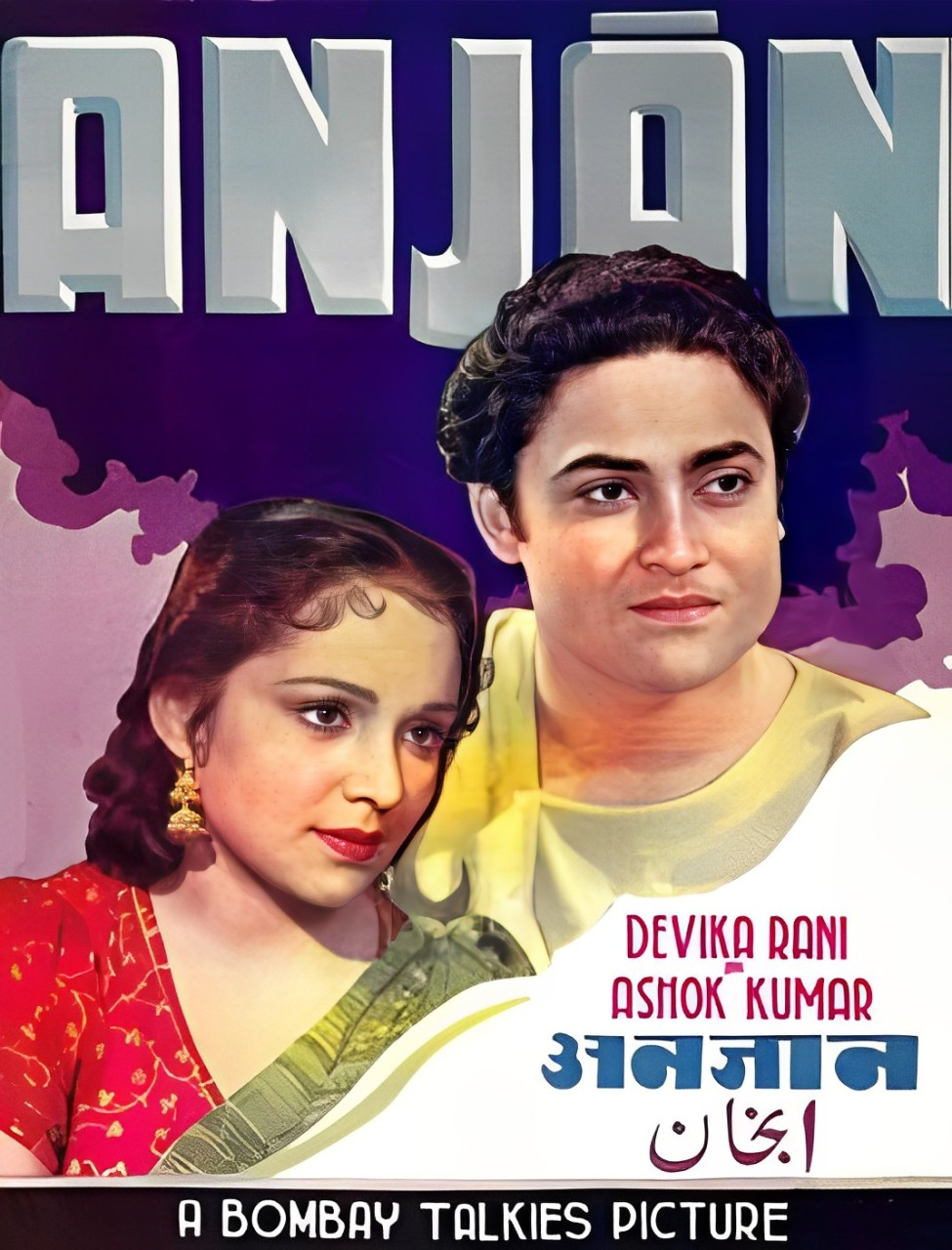
- Film poster
- Directed by: Amiya Chakrabarty
- Written by: Amiya Chakrabarty
- Produced by: Bombay Talkies
- Starring: Devika Rani; Ashok Kumar; David; Om Prakash
- Cinematography: R. D. Mathur
- Music by: Pannalal Ghosh
- Release date: 27 September 1940
- Running time: 144 minutes
- Country: India
- Language: Hindi

Anjaan (The Unknown) is a 1940 Indian Hindi-language film directed by Amiya Chakrabarty and produced by Bombay Talkies. It was Chakrabarty's first film direction. The film's story and screenplay were by Amiya Chakrabarty, with dialogues by J. S. Casshyap. The cinematography was by the debutant R. D. Mathur. Its music direction was by Pannalal Ghosh, with lyrics by Kavi Pradeep and P. L. Santoshi. The film starred Devika Rani, who had recently returned to films after a two-year absence, following the death of her husband Himanshu Rai in 1940. The cast included Ashok Kumar, David, V. H. Desai, Gulab, Suresh and Om Prakash.

Devika Rani and Ashok Kumar formed a popular pair and acted together in eight films from 1936 to 1941. Devika enjoyed a higher status, was termed as a "bigger star" and was accorded top billing. Their films included Jeevan Naiya (1936), Achhut Kanya (1936), Janmabhoomi (1936), Izzat (1937), Savitri (1937), Nirmala (1938), Vachan (1938) and Anjaan (1941).

Anjaan revolved around Devika Rani playing a governess to Ranima's children. She gets entangled in a love triangle involving a doctor played by Ashok Kumar, and the estate manager.

== Plot ==
Indira (Devika Rani) is a poor governess employed by the widow, Ranima (Gulab), of a Zamindar for her two children. The estate manager Ramnath (Girish) falls in love with her and turns to villainous acts in order to win her over. Devika falls in love with the doctor, Ajit, played by Ashok Kumar, who looks after Ranima and is guardian to the two children. Following a scheming plot when Ranima dies, Ramnath implicates Ajit, for which he is apprehended. A court scene follows where Ajit is successful in acquitting himself. Indira and Ajit get together in the end, while the villain is convicted.

== Cast ==
- Devika Rani as Indira
- Ashok Kumar as Ajit
- V. H. Desai
- David
- Om Prakash
- Girish as Ramnath
- Suresh (Master Suresh)
- P. F. Pithawala
- Gulab
- Fatty Prasad
- Yusuf Sulehman
- Syed Mukhtar

== Review ==
The film came in for praise from the editor of the cine-magazine, Filmindia, Baburao Patel. Titling the review as "Devika Returns With Charming Vengeance" he called it "a personal triumph for Devika Rani without whom even a foot of the picture becomes boring". The cinematographer R. D. Mathur was said to have in his "very first chance" "proved himself to be the best camera artist in the studio".

== Soundtrack ==
With music directed by the "famous classical flautist" Pannalal Ghosh, the film had lyrics by Kavi Pradeep and P. L. Santosh. The singers were Devika Rani,

=== Songlist ===
#	Title	Singer	Lyricist
1	"Aayi Paschim Se Ghata"	Devika Rani	Kavi Pradeep
2	"Chhalko Na Ras Ki Gagariya"	Rajkimari	Kavi Pradeep
3	"Khincho Kamaan Khincho"	Ashok Kumar, Suresh Babu Mane, Rewashankar	Pradeep
4	"Main Toh Tumse Bandhi Rahoon"	Devika Rani	Pradeep
5	"Mere Jeevan Ke Path Par"	Devika Rani, Ashok Kumar	Pradeep
6	"Pyare Pyare Sapne Humare"	Ashok Kumar	Pradeep
7	"Pyare Pyare Sapne Humare"	Devika Rani	Pradeep
8	"Pyare Pyare Sapne Humare"	Ashok Kumar, Suresh Babu Mane, Rewashankar	Pradeep
9	"Sanwariya Re Sanwariya Chal Chal Re"	Arun Kumar Mukherji, Sushila Rani	P. L. Santoshi
10	"Sanwariya Re Sanwariya Chal Chal Re"	Arun Kumar Mukherji	P. L. Santoshi

== See also ==
- Bollywood films of 1940
