= The Head of Gonzalez =

1920 film

- Directed by: Franz Osten
- Cinematography: Franz Koch
- Production company: Münchner Lichtspielkunst
- Distributed by: Münchner Lichtspielkunst
- Release date: 17 December 1920
- Country: Germany
- Languages: Silent; German intertitles

The Head of Gonzalez (German: Der Kopf des Gonzalez) is a 1920 German silent film directed by Franz Osten.

It was made at the Emelka Studios in Munich.

== Cast ==
- Else Bodenheim
- Fritz Greiner

== Bibliography ==
- Sanjit Narwekar. Directory of Indian film-makers and films. Flicks Books, 1994.
