= Jhumroo =

- Film poster
- Directed by: Shankar Mukherjee
- Written by: Screenplay: Madhusudan Kalelkar; Dialogues: Vrajendra Gaur
- Story by: Kishore Kumar
- Starring: Madhubala; Kishore Kumar
- Music by: Kishore Kumar
- Production company: K. S. Films
- Release date: 27 January 1961
- Running time: 171 minutes
- Country: India
- Language: Hindi
- Box office: ₹1.1 crore (equivalent to ₹106 crore or US$11 million in 2026)

Jhumroo is a 1961 Indian Hindi-language romantic comedy film directed by Shankar Mukherjee. It stars Madhubala and Kishore Kumar in lead roles, with Chanchal, Anoop Kumar, Lalita Pawar and Jayant appearing in supporting roles. The screenplay is written by Madhusudan Kalelkar, dialogue by Vrajendra Gaud and story by Kishore Kumar. Jhumroo was theatrically released on 27 January, 1961 and became a box office success. It is among the final films to star Madhubala.

== Plot ==
Anjana, a wealthy girl returns to her home after completing her education. Here she meets Jhumroo, a local tribal and falls in love with him. Her father strongly disapproves of the match. It turns out that Jhumroo's foster mother is the real mother of Anjana. Her father's best friend, whom her father had duped, is the real father of Jhumroo. Watch the movie to find out how it all ends.

== Cast ==
- Madhubala as Anjana
- Kishore Kumar as Jhumroo
- Lalita Pawar as Kamli/Kamla
- Jayant as Dwarka Nath
- Chanchal as Chamki
- Anoop Kumar as Ramesh
- Sajjan as Banno
- M. Kumar as Bihari

== Soundtrack ==
The soundtrack was composed by Kishore Kumar. The music was arranged by S.D. Burman's musical band.

The song "Koi Humdum Na Raha" was a cover of the song of the same name, composed by Saraswati Devi, and sung by the actor – and occasional singer – Ashok Kumar for Jeevan Naiya (1936). Kishore Kumar had heard Ashok Kumar sing "Koi Humdum Na Raha" as a five years old, and developed an affinity for it, so much so that he would practice riyaz singing it during his boyhood days. Two and a half decades later, while composing the music for Jhumroo, Kishore proposed to render the song for his film, and approached his brother for it. But as it happens, when his brother tried to dissuade him from doing so, saying that it was an intricate metre to compose, Kishore light-heartedly observed, "I don’t know about that but I will sing it and I will sing it better than you." And with that exchange of banter, he proceeded to render the song. "Koi Humdum Na Raha" is often regarded by music connoisseurs as one of Kumar's best songs.

Lyrics of all songs written by Majrooh Sultanpuri, except for two songs, Main hoon jhumroo and Ruk tuk thum thum, which were both written by Kishore Kumar.

Track listing
No.	Title	Lyrics	Singer(s)	Length
1.	"Main Hoon Jhumroo"	Kishore Kumar	Kishore Kumar	3:24
2.	"Babu Aana Sunte Jana"	Majrooh Sultanpuri	Asha Bhosle and Kishore Kumar	5:52
3.	"Jhoome Re Jhoome"	Majrooh Sultanpuri	Asha Bhosle and Kishore Kumar	3:23
4.	"Ae Baba Lu Baba Lu Ba Ba"	Majrooh Sultanpuri	Asha Bhosle and Kishore Kumar	4:50
5.	"Aa Ja Tu Aa Ja Aji Na"	Majrooh Sultanpuri	Kishore Kumar and Usha Mangeshkar	4:35
6.	"Ruk Ruk Thum Thum"	Kishore Kumar	Asha Bhosle	3:05
7.	"Koi Humdum Na Raha" (Raga Jhinjhoti)	Majrooh Sultanpuri	Kishore Kumar	3:24
8.	"Thandi Hawa Ye Chandni Suhani"	Majrooh Sultanpuri	Kishore Kumar	5:24
9.	"Matwale Hum Matwale Tum"	Majrooh Sultanpuri	Kishore Kumar	3:28
10.	"Ae Bhola Bhala Man Mera"	Majrooh Sultanpuri	Asha Bhosle and Kishore Kumar	5:52
11.	"Ge Ge Geli Jara Timbaktu Kathmandu"	Majrooh Sultanpuri	Kishore Kumar	5:23
12.	"Main Albela Mastana"		Kishore Kumar, Asha Bhosle
Total length:				48:00

== Release ==
Jhumroo was released on January 27, 1961.

== Reception ==
=== Critical reception ===
A Times of India review, dated 15 October 1961, carried the headline: "K. S. Films' Jhumroo Is A Noisy Entertainer".

In Filmigeek's retrospective review, it was written that "Jhumroo follows a set of conventions that are relatively ordinary for filmi romantic comedy." It praised the soundtrack of the film saying, "The songs keep coming fast and thick, and they are all well-crafted both musically and visually." Writing about Madhubala's performance, it stated that she is "genius at a gentle physical comedy that both gets out of Kishore's way to let him own the screen."

=== Box office ===
It earned ₹1.1 crore at the box office, with a net profit of ₹0.55 crore. The film was a commercial success and emerged as the eleventh highest-grossing film of 1961.
