= Jeevan Naiya =

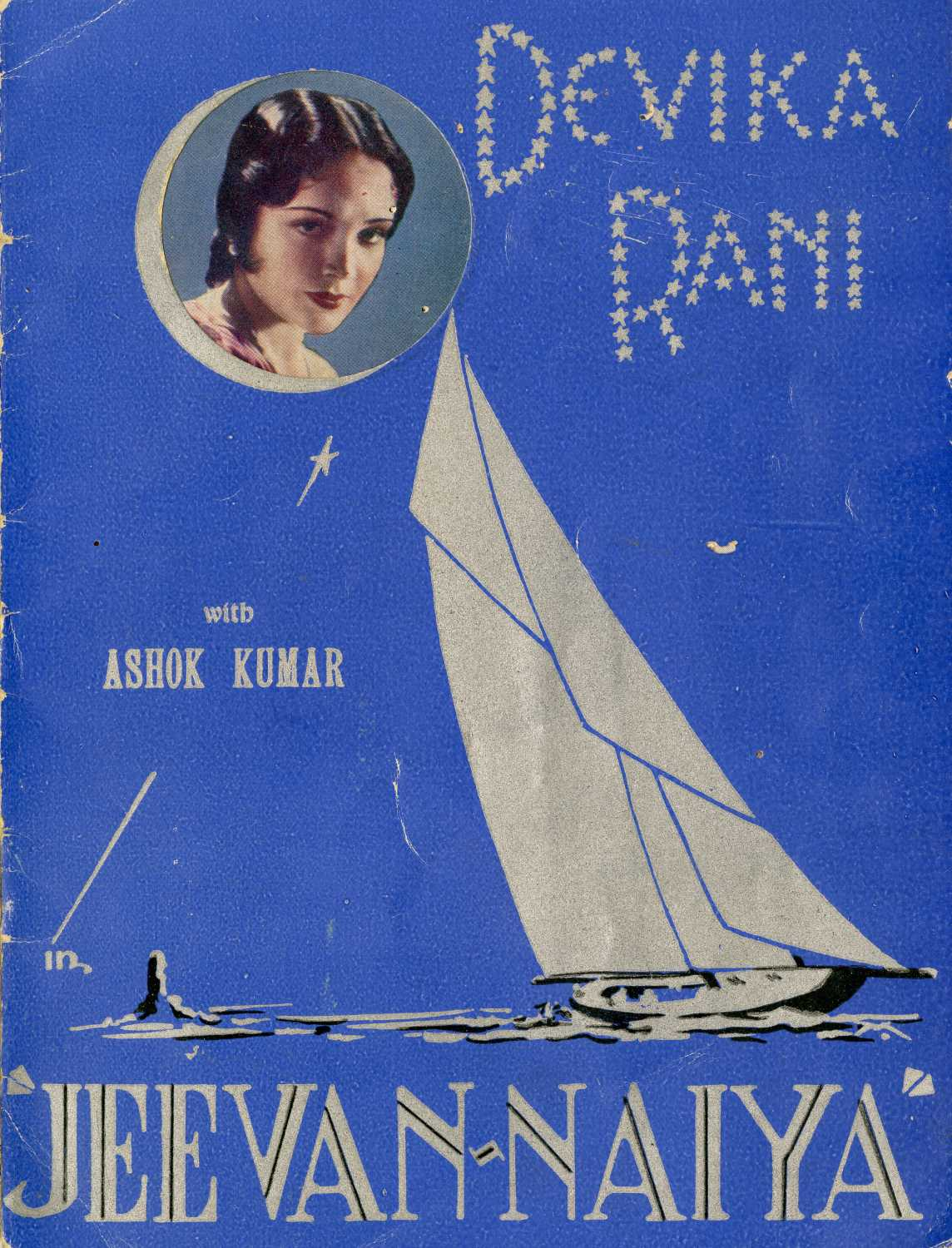
- Directed by: Franz Osten
- Written by: J. S. Kashyap; Niranjan Pal
- Produced by: Himanshu Rai
- Starring: Devika Rani; Ashok Kumar
- Cinematography: Josef Wirsching
- Music by: Saraswati Devi; J.S. Kashyap (lyrics)
- Production company: Bombay Talkies
- Release date: 1936
- Running time: 140 min
- Country: India
- Language: Hindi

Jeevan Naiya (1936) by Franz Osten

Jeevan Naiya is a 1936 Indian Hindi film directed by Franz Osten, and produced by Himanshu Rai for his studio Bombay Talkies. It is famous for being the screen debut of early superstar Ashok Kumar. The film is about the ostracism of dancing girls. The film was one of several successful Bombay Talkies collaborations between Franz Osten, Himashu Rai, screenwriters J. S. Kashyap and Niranjan Pal, and their leading lady of the time, Devika Rani.

It also featured the famous song "Koi Humdum Na Raha", sung by Ashok Kumar, with music by Saraswati Devi and lyrics by Jamuna Swarup Kashyap (J. S. Kashyap), later sung by Kishore Kumar in the film Jhumroo (1961).

== Cast ==
- Devika Rani as Lata
- Ashok Kumar as Karan
- Kamta Prasad as Mathuradas
- Anwari Begum
- Kusum Kumari
- K. J. Joshi
- S. N. Tripathi as Chand

== Production ==
Devika Rani's original co-star in the film was Najm-ul-Hassan. They developed a romantic relationship and eloped during the shooting of the film. Himanshu, who was married to Devika Rani at the time, was both enraged and distraught. Since the leading pair were absent, production was stalled. A significant portion of the movie had been shot and a large sum of money, which had been taken as credit from financers, had been spent. The studio therefore suffered severe financial losses and a loss of credit among bankers in the city while the runaway couple made merry.

Sashadhar Mukherjee, an assistant sound-engineer at the studio, who had a brotherly bond with Devika Rani, established contact with the runaway couple and managed to convince Devika Rani to return to her husband. She negotiated a financial deal with her husband with the help of Sashadhar Mukherjee, as a condition for her return. Despite the additional expense involved in re-shooting many portions of the film, Himanshu Rai replaced Najm-ul-Hassan with Ashok Kumar, who was the brother of Sashadhar Mukherjee's wife, as the hero of the film. This marked the debut, improbable as it may seem, of Ashok Kumar's six-decade-long career in Hindi films. Najm-ul-Hassan was dismissed from his job at Bombay Talkies (this was the period in which actors and actresses were paid regular monthly salaries by one specific film studio and could not work in any other studio). His reputation as a dangerous cad established, he could not find work in any other studio. His career was ruined and he sank into obscurity.

== Bibliography ==
- Manṭo, Saʻādat Ḥasan (2003). Black Margins: Stories. Katha. ISBN 978-81-87649-40-3.
