= Jhoola (1941 film) =

- Directed by: Gyan Mukherjee
- Written by: Gyan Mukherjee (story & screenplay Shaheed Latif (screenplay & dialogue); P. L. Santoshi (screenplay & dialogue)
- Produced by: Sashadhar Mukherjee
- Starring: Leela Chitnis; Ashok Kumar
- Cinematography: R. D. Pareenja
- Edited by: Dattaram N. Pai
- Music by: Saraswati Devi
- Production company: Bombay Talkies
- Release date: 1941
- Running time: 2 Hours 50 Minutes
- Country: India
- Language: Hindi

Jhoola

Jhoola (transl. Swing) is a 1941 Indian Hindi-language film directed by Gyan Mukherjee. It was produced by Sashadhar Mukherjee under the banner of Bombay Talkies. The film starred Leela Chitnis, Ashok Kumar, Shah Nawaz, V.H.Desai, Mumtaz Ali, Karuna Devi, Shahzadi, Rajkumari Shukla, Minoo Cooper (Also known as Minoo the Mystic), M.A.Aziz, and Master Laxman. The music was composed by Saraswati Devi with lyrics by Kavi Pradeep. The film was remade in Telugu as Uyyala Jampala (1965).

== Synopsis ==
A young widow called Kamala (Karuna Devi) approaches the new zamindar of her village to get the land tax waived as she is in bad financial straits. She has called for a private audience with him, where she is surprised to discover that the new zamindar is none other than Mahesh (Shah Nawaz), her one-time lover. Mahesh inquires about her late husband out of curiosity, only to discover to his surprise that she never married. Having considered him her husband, she pretended to be a widow to avoid being forced into marriage against her will.

The irresponsible, hedonistic Mahesh waives off her taxes, but refuses to take the relationship any further. On his way back, he stops at the post office to send a telegram. There he meets a young lady Geeta (Leela Chitnis) seated on a swing (Jhoola), to whom he is instantly attracted. Geeta is the niece of the postmaster (V. H. Desai), with whom she is living. An amateur photographer, Mahesh captures pictures of Geeta before leaving for his home in the city.

Back home, he gets into a heated discussion with his father, who intends to make a will distributing his property equally between his two sons: Mahesh and his adopted younger brother Ramesh. The old man strains his already weak heart in the course of the quarrel, suffering a heart attack.

News of the heart attack is instantly relayed to Ramesh (Ashok Kumar), who rushes to meet his dying adopted father one last time. After a short meeting, the old man passes away. Mahesh, who is angry with his father for giving away half the property to a man who is not even his real son, picks up a quarrel with Ramesh. Disgusted with his brother's behaviour, Ramesh leaves the house in a huff.

Unsure where to go, Ramesh boards a train. There he chances on the image of Geeta seated on the swing, which is the cover photo of a magazine. Instantly drawn to the face, he heads for Jharnaghat, the village where the young lady lives - unaware of the fact that the village is part of his inheritance.

Once in Jharnaghat, Ramesh lives next door to the postmaster's assistant (Mumtaz Ali). He uses an alias to conceal his actual identity, writing love letters to Geeta using his actual name. The circumstances lead Geeta to think that her anonymous lover is none other than the man with the camera (who she later discovers is also the zamindar of her village).

Ramesh' innocent actions result in a series of misunderstandings, which are eventually sorted out. The brothers finally patch up, Ramesh marrying Geeta and Mahesh agreeing to marry Kamala.

== Cast ==
- Leela Chitnis as Geeta
- Ashok Kumar as Ramesh
- Shah Nawaz as Mahesh
- V.H.Desai as Postmaster
- Mumtaz Ali as Postman/Dancing Courtier
- Karuna Devi as Kamala
- Shahzadi
- Rajkumari Shukla
- Minoo Cooper
- M.A.Aziz
- Master Laxman

== Reception ==
Jhoola was the fourth highest grossing Indian film of 1941.

== Legacy ==
The song naa jaane kidhar aaj merii naav chalii re (I know not where my boat is heading), sung by Ashok Kumar, was an immensely popular song in the 40s.

Another song from the movie, mai.n to dillii se dulahan, was extremely popular. Dance master Mumtaz Ali capitalised on the success of that song to start his own dance troupe.

The song ek chatur naar was later popularized when it was sung in 1968 musical comedy Padosan by Manna Dey, Ashok Kumar's brother Kishore Kumar, and Mumtaz Ali's son Mehmood.

Having played second fiddle to his heroines in all his earlier movies, Jhoola was the first movie in which Ashok Kumar played the lead role. The success of the movie established him as one of the popular actors of the era, two years before the runaway success of Kismet (1943) would propel him to stardom.
