= The Black Face =

1921 film

- Directed by: Franz Osten
- Written by: Johannes Brandt
- Cinematography: Franz Planer
- Production company: Münchner Lichtspielkunst
- Release date: 1921
- Country: Germany
- Languages: Silent; German intertitles

The Black Face (German: Das schwarze Gesicht) is a 1921 German silent film directed by Franz Osten.

It was made at the Emelka Studios in Munich.

== Cast ==
- Emil Fenyő
- Irma Gerold
- Fritz Greiner
- Mara Tchoukleva

== Bibliography ==
- Narwekar, Sanjit, ed. (1994). Directory of Indian Film-Makers and Films. Trowbridge: Flicks Books. ISBN 978-0-948911-40-8.
