= Achhut Kannya =

1936 film

- Poster
- Directed by: Franz Osten
- Written by: Niranjan Pal
- Produced by: Himanshu Rai
- Starring: Ashok Kumar; Devika Rani
- Cinematography: Josef Wirsching
- Music by: Saraswati Devi
- Release date: 1936
- Running time: 136 Minutes
- Country: British India
- Language: Hindustani

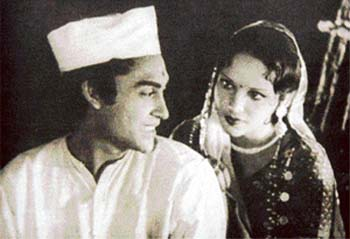
Devika Rani and Ashok Kumar in Achhut Kanya

Achhut Kannya

Achhut Kannya (English: Untouchable Maiden) is a 1936 Indian Hindi film. The film deals with the social position of Dalit girls and is considered a reformist period-piece.

The film was one of several successful Bombay Talkies collaborations between Franz Osten, Niranjan Pal, Himanshu Rai, and their leading lady, Devika Rani. Music is by Saraswati Devi and lyrics by J.S. Kashyap. The film stars Ashok Kumar and Devika Rani and this was Kumar's debut film.

== Plot ==
Mohan, a Brahman by caste, sells daily essentials to villagers. He is a kind soul and helps those really in need. Dukhiya, a kacchu by caste, is a railway crossing guard. Though an untouchable, he saved Mohan's life from a snake-bite and since then Mohan and Dukhiya develop a friendship. Meanwhile, Pratap, Mohan's son, befriends Kasturi, Dukhiya's daughter, since childhood. Growing up together, they fall in love with each other. Babulal, the village doctor, holds a grudge against Mohan and always looks for any chance to slander his reputation in village.

Social conventions preclude any possibility of Pratap (a Brahmin boy) and Kasturi - being an untouchable girl (achhut) - uniting.

Thereafter, due to many evil twists and turns of fate and instances, Pratap ends up marrying Meera (Manorama), while Kasturi marries Mannu. Both of them are unable to forget their first love, but try hard to make their respective marriages work. Unfortunately, the situation gets compounded by the fact that Mannu also has a first wife, Kajri, with whom he is estranged due to excessive interference from his in-laws. The hitherto smug Kajri suddenly feels threatened by the arrival of a new woman in her husband's life and arrives at Mannu's house unannounced.

Meera earnestly tries to win Pratap's attention and confesses her troubles to her friend, Kajri. Kajri who is also unable to gain attention of Mannu blames Kasturi for her misfortune and poisons Meera's mind. The two of them hatch a diabolical plan to discredit Kasturi in the eyes of Mannu and villagers. They take Kasturi along to a mela in the neighbouring village, and then abandon her there. While searching for them in fair, Kasturi meets Pratap, who has a food stall there and both of them decide to return to their village. Meera and Kajri return to their village and tell Mannu that Kasturi has eloped with Pratap.

Seeing Pratap and Kasturi returning together, an enraged Mannu attacks Pratap, exactly when his Bullock-cart just arrives at the railroad crossing. Fists fly between the two, even as a train rushes towards them and the bullock-cart. Desperate to save all lives at stake, Kasturi rushes towards the train, signaling and imploring the driver to stop and in the process gets killed. That act of selflessness makes her a martyr in the eyes of the villagers, despite her lowly birth.

== Cast ==
- Devika Rani as Kasturi
- Ashok Kumar as Pratap
- Manorama as Meera, not to be confused with Manorama
- Anwar as Mannu
- Pramila as Kajari
- Kamta Prasad as Dukhia
- Kusum Kumari as Kalyani
- P. F. Pithawala as Mohan
- Kishori Lal as Babulal
- N. M. Joshi as Inspector of Police
- Ishrat as Sukhlal
- Khosla as Patient

Principal Dancers

- Mumtaz Ali
- Sunita Devi
