= Karma (1933 film) =

1933 film

- Directed by: J.L. Freer Hunt
- Written by: Rupert Downing
- Story by: Dewan Sharar
- Starring: Devika Rani; Himanshu Rai
- Music by: Ernst Broadhurst
- Release date: May 1933 (UK)
- Running time: 68 mins.
- Countries: India; Germany; United Kingdom
- Languages: English, Hindi

Karma

Karma is a 1933 bilingual film starring Devika Rani and Himanshu Rai. The film was directed by J. L. Freer Hunt and was a joint production of India, Germany and the United Kingdom. Karma featured a four-minute kissing scene between the lead actors, Devika Rani and her real-life spouse Rai, the longest in an Indian film. However, this has been incorrectly reported, the kissing scene features a series of kisses and is less than 2 minutes long.

== Plot ==
The story is about a princess (played by Devika Rani) who falls in love with a neighbouring prince much to the disapproval of the latter's father.

== Cast ==
- Devika Rani as The Princess
- Sudha Rani as Her Companion
- Himansu Rai as The Prince
- Dewan Sharar as His Father, the Maharaja
- Abraham Sofaer as The Holy Man
- Kander as The Beggar
- Anil Chakrabarti as The Beater
- Ranabir Sen as His Father
- Amal Banerji as The Snake Charmer

== Production ==
The female lead Devika Rani, the grand niece of Nobel laureate Rabindranath Tagore was professionally associated with Rai even before the two married in 1929. Impressed by her talent, Rai decided to cast her in the film alongside him. Abraham Sofaer was cast in a pivotal role as a "Holy Man". The screenplay was co-written by Rai and Freer Hunt. The music was composed by German composer Ernst Broadhurst. Devika Rani had recorded a song in the film including the Hindi version.

Karma, an "Indo-German-British" collaboration, was released two years after the Alam Ara (1931), the first Indian talkie. Karma was made targeting the international audience. The film was entirely shot in India while the post-production process was carried out in Stoll Studios, London. The film was the first talkie produced by Rai.

== Release ==
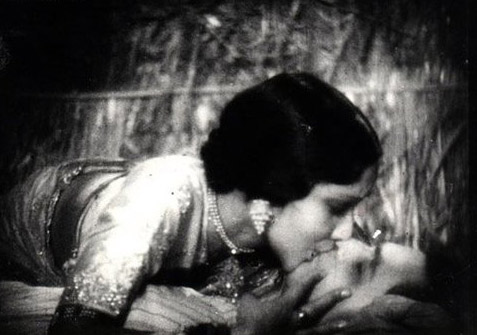
The kissing scene between Devika Rani and Himanshu Rai.

The film initially premiered in London in May 1933. Devika Rani's performance was lauded by the critics in London. However, when the film was released later in Hindi as Naagan Ki Raagini, it failed to impress the Indian audience.

The film was among the first in India to feature an on-screen kiss. The four-minute long scene between Devika Rani and Rai, her husband in real life, is also known to being the longest such scene in Indian cinema. Upon release, the film became controversial in the then "orthodox India" for featuring a kissing scene.

== Legacy ==
Though largely ignored in India at the time of its release, Karma is considered a landmark in Indian cinema due to its unprecedented kissing scene. In 2012, The Times of India described it as the "first Indian talkie with English dialogue which set all London talking".
