= Hamari Baat =

- Directed by: M.I. Dharamsey
- Starring: Devika Rani; Suraiya; David Abraham
- Music by: Anil Biswas
- Release date: 1943
- Country: India
- Language: Hindi

Hamari Baat is a Hindi-language film. It was released in 1943.

== Cast ==
- Devika Rani
- Suraiya
- David Abraham
- Dulari

== Soundtrack ==
The music of the film was composed by Anil Biswas.
