= Bombay Talkies =

Movie studio in Mumbai, India

Coordinates: 19.17903°N 72.84292°E

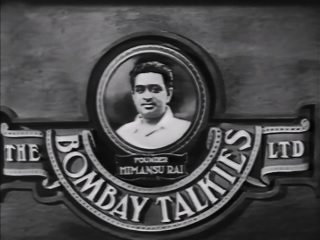
- Logo of Bombay Talkies
- Industry: Entertainment
- Founded: 22 June 1934
- Founders: Himanshu Rai; Niranjan Pal; Devika Rani
- Defunct: 13 October 1953
- Headquarters: Malad, Mumbai, Maharashtra, India
- Area served: British India
- Products: Motion pictures; Film production

Bombay Talkies was a movie studio founded in 1934. During nearly two decades of its operation, Bombay Talkies produced 40 movies in Malad, a suburb of the Indian city of Bombay.

The studio was established in 1934 by Himanshu Rai, Niranjan Pal (son of Bipin Chandra Pal) and Rai's wife Devika Rani. After Rai's death in 1940, Rani took over the studio. Besides the founders, Ashok Kumar was the leading actor of the studio until 1943, when he founded another studio, Filmistan, with Shashadhar Mukherjee. After Rani's retirement, Kumar and Mukherjee took over Bombay Talkies. The company went out of business in 1953. A last film produced by the studio was released in June 1954.

== Early years ==
For the period in cinematic history it represented, Bombay Talkies was considered to be an innovative and highly resourced movie studio. In line with international standards, the studios' facilities included sound and echo-proof stages, laboratories, editing rooms and a preview theater. The reputation of Bombay Talkies was further enhanced by employing experienced European technicians, the most prominent of whom was Franz Osten.

Bombay Talkies set a high technical standard for film making in India and was credited with introducing a level of professionalism to the medium of movie making and acting, reputedly higher than standards set by rival Indian film production companies. Bombay Talkies acquired a reputation for changing the aesthetics and technology traditionally associated with Indian films. It was also renowned for producing films on (then) controversial topics such as those dealing with love between an untouchable lower caste girl and a high caste Hindu Brahmin boy e.g. (Achhut Kanya).

Devika Rani, who became one of Bombay Talkies' most successful actresses, and India's first film diva, appeared in Jawani ki Hawa (1935) and Jeevan Naiya (1936), as well as a number of other highly successful productions by the company. The studio was similarly recognised as having launched the careers of several prominent Indian film actors including Devika Rani, Ashok Kumar, Leela Chitnis, Mehmood Ali, Madhubala and Dilip Kumar. Madhubala and Dilip Kumar, who co-starred in four Bombay Talkies films, engaged in a long term, highly covert love affair. Raj Kapoor worked as an assistant to Amiya Chakravarty of Bombay Talkies, before becoming a famous director.

== Success ==
Following the outbreak of World War II in 1939, the company faced a number of problems. The most significant change for the studio involved Himanshu Rai, the studio's founder, suffering a nervous breakdown which ultimately resulted in his demise. Following the shock caused by his demise, control of the film company passed on to Devika Rani who was appointed as the key producer of the Bombay Talkies studios. Despite, or perhaps because of, her prior experience as an actress, Devika Rani was highly successful in sustaining the production values of the company, and the studio subsequently retained its dominance over the rapidly expanding Indian film industry. The most successful Bombay Talkies films produced during this period included Kangan and Bandhan, both of which featured Leela Chitnis and Ashok Kumar. In 1943, Kismet created a local record for the longest continual showing of the same film. The movie continued to run for more than three and half years at the Roxy movie theater in Calcutta, India.

== Decline ==
Despite Devika Rani's success as the Bombay Talkies' head producer, in 1943 a rift arose between her and her managers Sashadhar Mukherjee and Ashok Kumar. Although reasons for the rift have never been made public and largely remain unclear to film industry observers, Sashadhar Mukheerjee and Ashok Kumar allegedly attempted to begin their own production house under the guise of Bombay Talkies. Despite Devika Rani, Sashadhar Mukherjee, and Ashok Kumar attempting to create a working relationship which involved alternating production of major films between the two rival production camps, the relationship proved untenable and was fraught with allegations of sabotage, dramatic ego clashes, in-fighting, and the relentless circulation of malicious rumors.

Negotiations between Devika Rani on the one hand and Sashadhar Mukherjee and Ashok Kumar on the other failed to unite the company. Shashdhar Mukherjee, Ashok Kumar and a few others left the company in 1943 to found Filmistan. In 1945, Devika Rani married the Russian painter Svetoslav Roerich, sold her Bombay Talkies shares and left the industry. After several attempts to reunite the studio, it was sold to Tolaram Jalan, a businessman, who decided to cease its operations in 1953.

== Timeline ==
- 1934: The Bombay Talkies film company is conceived and established.
- 1935: Jawani Ki Hawa, a thriller starring Devika Rani is released.
- 1936: Jeevan Naiya and Achhut Kanya are released to wide acclaim.
- 1940: Himanshu Rai, a key founder of the Bombay Talkies dies.
- 1942: Madhubala makes her debut as a child artist named Baby Mumtaz in the movie Basant.
- 1943: Kismet, a successful thriller, is released. It becomes the highest-grossing film of all time, also the first movie to collect 1 crore.
- 1944: Dilip Kumar's first movie Jwar Bhata is released.
- 1948: Ziddi, featuring Dev Anand is released, transforming the previously unknown actor into a well known celebrity.
- 1949: Mahal, becomes a blockbuster, making its leading lady Madhubala an overnight sensation.
- 1954: The Bombay Talkies company is closed down.
- 1969: Madhubala, who had worked in several Bombay Talkies productions passes away on 23 February 1969, at the age of 36.
- 1994: Devika Rani, a highly respected actress and former head of production for the Bombay Talkies studios dies in Bangalore on 9 March 1994.
- 2001: Ashok Kumar, who appeared in a number of Bombay Talkies productions dies on 10 December 2001.
- 2021: Dilip Kumar, a highly respected actor referred to as 'Tragedy king' passes away on 7 July 2021, at the age of 98.

== Filmography ==
Year	Film	Director	Music director	Cast
1935	Jawani Ki Hawa	Franz Osten	Saraswati Devi	Najamul Hussain, Devika Rani
1936	Achhut Kanya	Franz Osten	Saraswati Devi	Ashok Kumar, Devika Rani
1936	Janmabhoomi	Franz Osten	Saraswati Devi	Ashok Kumar, Devika Rani
1936	Jeevan Naiya	Franz Osten	Saraswati Devi	Ashok Kumar, Devika Rani
1936	Mamta and Miya Biwi	Franz Osten	Saraswati Devi	Devika Rani, Najmul Hussain, J. S. Casshyap
1937	Izzat	Franz Osten	Saraswati Devi	Ashok Kumar, Devika Rani
1937	Jeevan Prabhat	Franz Osten	Saraswati Devi	Kishore Sahu, Devika Rani
1937	Prem Kahani	Franz Osten	Saraswati Devi	Ashok Kumar, Maya Devi
1937	Savitri	Franz Osten	Saraswati Devi	Ashok Kumar, Devika Rani
1938	Bhabhi	Franz Osten	Saraswati Devi	Renuka Devi, P Jairaj
1938	Nirmala	Franz Osten	Saraswati Devi	Ashok Kumar, Devika Rani
1938	Vachan	Franz Osten	Saraswati Devi	Ashok Kumar, Devika Rani
1939	Durga	Franz Osten	Saraswati Devi	Devika Rani, Rama Shukul
1939	Kangan	Franz Osten	Saraswati Devi + Ramchandra Paal	Leela Chitnis, Ashok Kumar
1939	Navjeevan	Franz Osten	Saraswati Devi	Hansa Wadkar, Rama Shukul
1940	Azad	N R Acharya	Saraswati Devi + Ramchandra Paal	Leela Chitnis, Ashok Kumar
1940	Bandhan	N. R. Acharya	Saraswati Devi + Ramchandra Paal	Leela Chitnis, Ashok Kumar
1940	Punar Milan	Najam Naqvi	Ramchandra Paal	Snehprabha, Kishore Sahu
1941	Anjaan	Amiya Chakrabarty	Pannalal Ghosh	Devika Rani, Ashok Kumar
1941	Jhoola	Gyan Mukherjee	Saraswati Devi	Leela Chitnis, Ashok Kumar
1941	Naya Sansar	N. R. Acharya	Saraswati Devi + Ramchandra Paal	Renuka Devi, Ashok Kumar
1942	Basant	Amiya Chakrabarty	Pannalal Ghosh	Mumtaz Shanti, Ullhas, Madhubala (debut)
1943	Hamari Baat	M.I. Dharamsey	Anil Biswas	Devika Rani, Jairaj
1943	Kismat (or Kismet or Qismat)	Gyan Mukherjee	Anil Biswas	Ashok Kumar, Mumtaz Shanti
1944	Char Ankhen	Sushil Majumdar	Anil Biswas	Jairaj, Leela Chitnis
1944	Jwar Bhata	Amiya Chakravarty	Anil Biswas	Dilip Kumar (debut), Mrudula, Shamim
1945	Pratima	Jairaj	Arun Kumar Mukherjee	Dilip Kumar, Swarnalata, Jyoti, Mukri
1946	Milan	Nitin Bose	Anil Biswas	Dilip Kumar, Meera Mishra, Ranjana, Moni Chatterjee
1947	Nateeja	Najam Naqvi	Rasheed Atre	Yaqub, Shamim, Majid Khan
1947	Noukadubi	Nitin Bose	Anil Biswas	Abhi Bhattacharya, Meera Mishra
1948	Majboor	Nazir Ajmeri	Ghulam Haider	Munnawar Sultana, Shyam, Sohan
1948	Ziddi	Shaheed Latif	Khemchand Prakash	Kamini Kaushal, Dev Anand, Veera
1949	Mahal	Kamal Amrohi	Khemchand Prakash	Ashok Kumar, Madhubala, Kumar
1950	Samar	Nitin Bose	S. D. Burman	Sumitra Devi, Ashok Kumar
1950	Sangram	Gyan Mukherjee	C. Ramchandra	Nalini Jaywant, Ashok Kumar, Nawab
1950	Mashaal	Nitin Bose	S. D. Burman	Ashok Kumar, Sumitra Devi, Ruma Devi
1950	Muqaddar	Aravind Sen	Khemchand Prakash	Nalini Jaywant, Sajjan, Kishore Kumar
1952	Maa	Bimal Roy	S. K. Pal	Bharat Bhushan, Leela Chitnis, Kusum Deshpande, Arun Kumar
1952	Tamasha	Phani Majumdar	Manna Dey, S. K. Pal, Khemchand Prakash	Dev Anand, Meena Kumari, Ashok Kumar
1954	Baadbaan	Phani Majudar	Timir Baran, S. K. Pal	Dev Anand, Ashok Kumar, Meena Kumari
