= Franz Osten =

Bavarian filmmaker (1876–1956)

- Born: 23 December 1876; Munich, Bavaria
- Died: 2 December 1956 (aged 79)
- Occupations: Filmmaker, Director

Franz Osten (23 December 1876 in Munich – 2 December 1956) was a Bavarian filmmaker who along with Himansu Rai was among the first retainers of Bombay Talkies. Osten partnered with Rai on a number of India's earliest blockbuster films like Achhut Kanya and Jeevan Naiya.

== Early life ==
Osten was born Franz Ostermayr in Munich on 23 December 1876. He trained to be a photographer like his father and gave acting a try. In 1907, he founded a traveling cinema called the "Original Physograph Company" with his brother Peter Ostermayr, who later established the predecessor to Bavaria Film Studios, today one of Germany's largest film studios. Amongst other films, he showed Life in India, a short documentary film about the Munich carnival. The run was not very successful: three days after the opening, the projector exploded in flames. Osten decided to make films and in 1911 directed his first feature, Erna Valeska. His career was interrupted by the start of the First World War. He worked first as a correspondent, then became a soldier. After the war Osten made peasant dramas like The War of the Oxen and Chain of Guilt for EMELKA in Munich.

== Filmography ==
Franz Osten's silent films tell varieties of Indian stories. The Light of Asia (1925) dealt with the life of Buddha. Shiraz (1928) dramatises the events that led to the construction of the Taj Mahal. A Throw of Dice (1929) was based on myths and legends drawn from Indian epic Mahabharata. These movies contributed to increasing the understanding of eastern religions and offered visual splendour and escapism, featuring live elephants in festive decoration and utilising thousands of extras.

Since early 2000s, there has been a revived interest in silent films in general and the trilogy of Osten are in focus. Shiraz was shown at the Castro Theatre at the San Francisco Silent Film Festival in 2002, Prem Sanyas at the same festival in 2005, and A Throw of Dice in 2008. Prapancha Pash was re-released in 2006.

=== Director (Indian Films) ===
- Prem Sanyas (1925) / Die Leuchte Asiens (German title) / The Light of Asia (English Title)
- Shiraz (1928) / Das Grabmal einer großen Liebe (German title)
- Prapancha Pash (1929) / Schicksalswürfel (German title) / A Throw of Dice (English Title)
- Jawani Ki Hawa (1935)
- Achhut Kanya (1936) / Die Unberührbare (German title) / Untouchable Girl (English title)
- Janmabhoomi (1936)
- Jeevan Naiya (1936)
- Mamta and Miya Aur Biwi (1936)
- Izzat (1937)
- Jeevan Prabhat (1937)
- Prem Kahani (1937)
- Savitri (1937)
- Bhabhi (1938)
- Nirmala (1938)
- Vachan (1938)
- Durga (1939)
- Kangan (1939)

== The Light of Asia ==
The Light of Asia was a unique collaboration which managed to satisfy the tastes of both German and Indian audiences began in 1924. The 28-year-old Indian solicitor Himansu Rai came to Munich in search of partners for series of films on world religions. He had studied law in Calcutta and London where as a student of Nobel Prize winner Rabindranath Tagore he had also directed a theatre group that promised to revive Indian acting and theatre traditions. He had heard that the passion plays of Oberammergau were a showcase for German culture and now wanted to create the Indian equivalent.

The Germans were to provide equipment, camera crew and the director, Franz Osten; Rai would provide the script, the actors, locations and all the capital necessary. On 26 February 1925, Osten and Rai, together with their cameramen, Willi Kiermeier and Josef Wirsching, and comedian Bertl Schultes as interpreter, boarded a ship for India. On 18 March they arrived in Bombay. There Osten began to shoot his first Indian film, Prem Sanyas – Die Leuchte Asiens-The Light of Asia, the first German–Indian co-production. The film tells the story of Prince Gautama Buddha, who according to an omen will "follow the sad and lowly path of self denial and pious pain" if he ever faces old age, sickness or death. To prevent this, the King keeps him imprisoned behind the high walls of his palace. One day Gautama leaves his golden cage and is confronted with human misery. At night a revelation comes to him in a dream. A mysterious voice bids him to choose between the carefree life with his beloved wife Gopa and a life in pursuit of eternal truth. In the early morning hours Gautama leaves the court of the King. Attacking common religious practices of sacrifice and self-humiliation, he soon builds up a sizeable following. A young woman kneels before him asking to be received amongst his followers. The woman is Gopa.

In India the film was rejected for lack of credibility. The cost of 171,423 Rupees was ten times that of an average Indian film. Even after amendments in the contract with EMELKA, the film lost Rs 50,000. In the United States the film lacked success as "motion picture audiences in America do not care to pay an admission fee to see a prince become a beggar.

== Selected filmography ==
Director (German Films)

- The War of the Oxen (1920)
- The Head of Gonzalez (1920)
- The Monastery's Hunter (1920)
- The Night of Decision (1920)
- The Black Face (1921)
- The Terror of the Sea (1924)
- The Tragedy of a Night of Passion (1924)
- A Song from Days of Youth (1925)
- Little Inge and Her Three Fathers (1926)
- The Seventh Son (1926)
- Break-in (1927)
- The Lady in Black (1928)
- The Eccentric (1929)
- The Judas of Tyrol (1933)
- At the Strasbourg (1934)
