= Niranjan Pal =

Indian screenwriter and director (1889–1959)

- Born: 17 August 1889; Calcutta, Bengal Presidency, British India
- Died: 9 November 1959 (aged 70); Calcutta, West Bengal, India
- Occupations: Playwright, screenwriter, director
- Years active: Silent and early talkie era
- Known for: Bombay Talkies; screenplays for The Light of Asia and Shiraz
- Parent: Bipin Chandra Pal (father)

Niranjan Pal (17 August 1889 – 9 November 1959) was an Indian playwright, screenwriter, and director in the Indian film industry in the silent and early talkie days. He was a close associate of Himanshu Rai and Franz Osten, with whom he was a founding member of Bombay Talkies.

== Biography ==
Born on 17 August 1889 in Calcutta, West Bengal, Niranjan Pal was born in an illustrious Bengali Kayastha family, his father was the noted freedom fighter, Bipin Chandra Pal, and Niranjan himself as a teenager was briefly involved in the Indian freedom struggle during an association with Vinayak Damodar Savarkar and Madanlal Dhingra in London. By the late 1910s, he started writing and eventually wrote The Light of Asia and Shiraz, both of which were performed on stage in London. Both were commercially successful and attracted the attention of German filmmaker Franz Osten, who made screen versions in India. Himanshu Rai, then a lawyer, also acted in one of Niranjan Pal's plays Goddess also performed in London, though some sources suggest that it was Devika Rani who first met him, through their common Brahmo Samaj connections, which paved way for his eventual stake in the creation of Bombay Talkies.

Following the successes of The Light of Asia and Shiraz 1928, Pal moved back to India with his English wife, Lily, and son Colin Pal, and embarked on a career as the screenplay writer for Bombay Talkies. He also started directing films, and made among others Needle's Eye (1931), Pardesia (1932), and Chitthi (1941). His career as a director was however far less successful than his work as a screenwriter, in which role he wrote some of India's earliest blockbusters Achhut Kanya (1936), Janmabhoomi (1936), Jeevan Naiya (1936) and Jawani Ki Hawa (1935). Of these Achhut Kanya was the most popular, and continues to be a landmark film as it dealt with the subject of untouchability.

He also collaborated with noted dancer, Uday Shankar to write a libretto for first Indian ballets, performed by Anna Pavlova and Uday Shankar himself.

== Family ==
Niranjan Pal's family is in the film industry, his son Colin Pal was a prominent journalist, and film historian, who wrote books, 'Shooting Stars' and autobiography "Aye Jibon: Such is life" won a National Award from the Indian Government in 2001. Colin died, on 28 August 2005, after a prolonged illness, in Mumbai, at the age of 83

== Bibliography ==
- "The Goddess;" a Play of Modern India, 1922.
