= P. F. Pithawala =

P. F. Pithawala was an actor, who appeared in several movies made by Bombay Talkies in the 1930s and 1940s.

== Filmography ==
Year	Film	Character
1935	Jawani Ki Hawa	Kamala's father
1936	Achhut Kanya	Mohan
1936	Janmabhoomi	Sanatan
1937	Izzat	
1937	Savitri	
1937	Jeevan Prabhat	
1939	Kangan	
1939	Navjeevan	
1939	Durga	
1940	Bandhan	
1941	Naya Sansar	
1941	Anjaan	Ramnath
1943	Kismet	Unnamed (Rani's father)
