= Saraswati Devi (music director) =

Indian composer (1912–1980)

- Born: Khurshid Mankesha Minocher-Homji; 1912
- Died: 9 August 1980 (aged 67–68)
- Occupation: Music Director
- Years active: 1935–1961

Saraswati Devi, born Khorshed Minocher-Homji (1912 – 9 August 1980), was an Indian director of music and score composer who worked in Hindi cinema in the 1930s and 1940s. She is most noted for her score, Mein Ban ki Chiriyra Banke Bun Bun Bolun Re in Bombay Talkies's Achut Kanya (1936). She along with Nargis' mother and Sanjay Dutt's grandmother Jaddanbai and Bibbo are considered to be one of the first female music composers in Indian cinema.

== Early life and education ==
Born in a Parsi family, she had a love for music. Realising this her father made her study Hindustani classical music under Vishnu Narayan Bhatkhande who was specialised in Dhrupad and Dhamar style of singing. Later she joined Marris College (later Bhatkhande Music Institute) at Lucknow and studied music.

== Career ==
With the setting up of an All India Radio station at Mumbai in the late 1920s she, along with her sister Manek, gave musical performances regularly. The programme, known as the Homji Sisters, was very popular with the listeners. The founder of Bombay Talkies, Himanshu Rai who was looking for a good classicalist for his movies, heard them on radio, got in touch with her, and invited her to visit the studio where she was shown the music room. He wanted her to take care of the music department and score music for his movies and Homji accepted the offer and took it as a challenge. Her first assignment was for the movie, Jawani Ki Hawa in 1935, starring Himanshu Rai's actress wife Devika Rani. She had a difficult time making the actors sing and had to simplify the tunes and cover some areas with music instead of song as they were no singers and play back was still not introduced.

Jawani Ki Hawa was followed by her first hit movie Achut Kanya (1936). Ashok Kumar, along with Devika Rani, where she spent several hours a day for day rehearsing for a song before it was filmed. Also in 1936, she gave the music for the film, Janmabhoomi, it was released during the Indian independence movement, and featured one of the first explicit nationalistic songs of Hindi cinema, "Jai Jai Janani Janmabhoomi" (Hail the land of our birth) written by J. S. Kashyap. Subsequently, a tune from the chorus of this song was used by the BBC as a signature tune for its Indian News Service.

There was a big uproar and a series of protests in the Parsi community. The board of directors of Bombay Talkies included some members from the Parsi community who objected to girls from their community being in the talkies. Rai defended them and Homji's identity was concealed by giving her the name Saraswati Devi. Her sister, who acted roles for the company, was given the name Chandraprabha. Devi is the first female music director in Hindi films.

Devi continued composing film music until 1961. She composed the song Koi Humdum Na Raha originally sung by Ashok Kumar in the film Jeevan Naiya (1936) and later sung by Kishore Kumar in Jhumroo (1961). She is also the original composer of famous song Ek Chatur Naar Kar Ke Shringar originally sung by Ashok Kumar in film Jhoola (1941) later sung by Manna Dey and Kishore Kumar in film Padosan.

== Death ==
She never married and lived alone in her apartment. One day she fell down from a bus and fractured her hip bone. None of the film personalities ever came for her help. The only help she got was from her neighbours. Saraswati Devi died on 9 August 1980 at the age of 68 leaving behind unforgettable memories of an era of which she was a golden link.

== Filmography ==
Year	Film	Note(s)
1935	Jawani Ki Hawa	
1936	Achut Kanya	
1936	Janmabhoomi	
1936	Jeevan Naiya	
1936	Mamta	
1936	Miya Biwi	
1937	Izzat	
1937	Jeevan Prabhat	
1937	Prem Kahani	
1937	Savitri	
1938	Bhabhi	
1938	Nirmala	
1938	Vachan	
1939	Durga	
1939	Kangan	with RC Pal
1939	Navjeewan	
1940	Azad	with RC Pal
1940	Bandhan	with RC Pal
1940	Prithvi Vallabh	
1941	Jhoola	
1941	Naya Sansar	with RC Pal
1943	Bhakt Raidas	
1943	Prarthana	
1944	Dr Kumar	
1944	Parakh Khursheed Anwar	
1945	Aamrapali	
1946	Maharani Mrinal Devi	
1947	Khandani	
1948	Naqli Heera	
1949	Usha Haran	
1950	Bachelor Husband	with Muhammed Ibrahim
1955	Inaam	with SN Tripathi
1961	Babasa Ri Laadi (Rajasthani)	

== Bibliography ==
- Gulzar, Govind Nihalani; Chatterjee, Saibal (2003). Encyclopaedia of Hindi Cinema. Popular Prakashan. ISBN 978-81-7991-066-5.
- Morcom, Anna (2007). Hindi Film Songs and the Cinema. Ashgate Publishing, Ltd. ISBN 978-0-7546-5198-7.
- Pauwels, Heidi R. M. (2007). Indian Literature and Popular Cinema: Recasting Classics. Routledge. ISBN 978-1-134-06255-3.
- Ranade, Ashok Da. (2006). Hindi Film Song: Music Beyond Boundaries. Bibliophile South Asia. ISBN 978-81-85002-64-4.
- Ranchan, Vijay (2014). Story of a Bollywood Song. Abhinav Publications. GGKEY:9E306RZQTQ7.
