= Himanshu Rai =

Indian filmmaker (1892–1940)

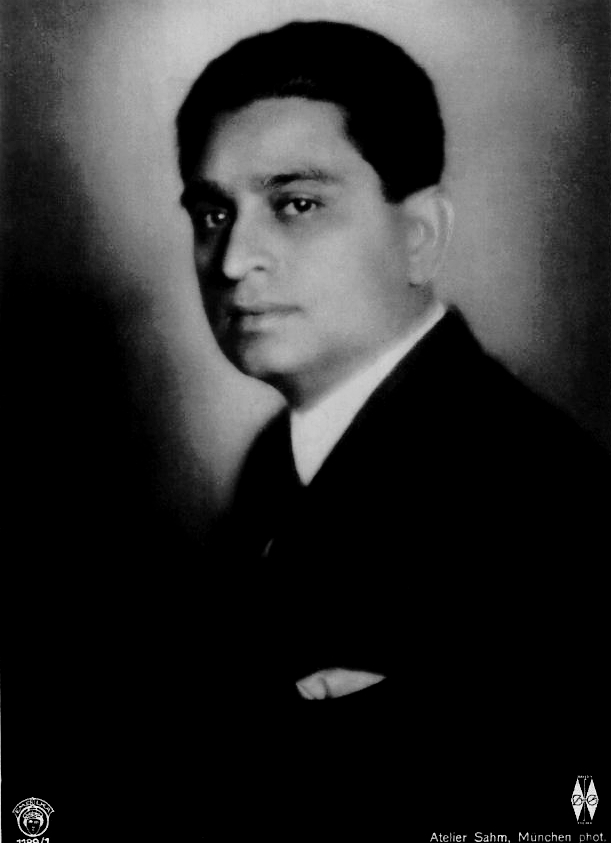
- Himanshu Rai
- Born: 1892; Cuttack, Bengal Presidency, British India
- Died: May 16, 1940 (aged 47–48)
- Occupations: Actor, director
- Spouses: Mary Hainlin (m. 1924; div. 1926) Devika Rani (m. 1929–1940)
- Children: Nilima Dietze (Hainlin) (1926–1997)

Himanshu Rai (1892 – 16 May 1940) was an Indian actor and film director. Regarded as one of the pioneers of Indian cinema, he is best known as the founder of the film studio Bombay Talkies in 1934, along with his wife Devika Rani. He was associated with a number of movies, including Goddess (1922), The Light of Asia (1925), Shiraz (1928), A Throw of Dice (1929) and Karma (1933). He was married to actress Devika Rani Chaudhuri (1929–1940).

== Biography ==
Born into an aristocratic Bengali family, Rai spent several years in Santiniketan for his schooling. After obtaining a law degree from Kolkata, he went to London to become a barrister. There, he met the playwright and screenwriter Niranjan Pal.

That association led to the making of a film, The Light of Asia, which he co-directed with Franz Osten. Rai was also one of the main actors in this film. While making his third film, Prapancha Pash, he met and fell in love with Devika Rani, a great-grandniece of the Nobel Laureate Rabindranath Tagore. Before this film was complete, he married her.

== Bombay Talkies ==
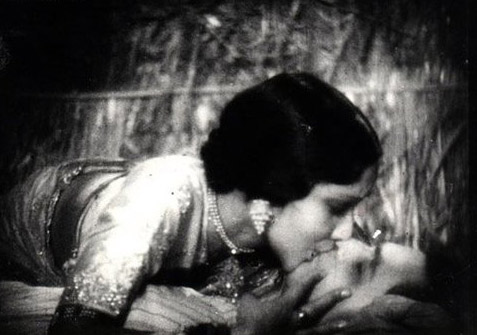
Devika Rani kissing Himanshu Rai in Karma (1933)

At Bombay Talkies studio, Rai partnered with Sashadhar Mukherjee, and Mukherjee's brother in law Ashok Kumar, worked as a technician in the studio. Due to suspected romantic liaisons between his wife Devika Rani and the leading man, Najmul Hasan, in Jeevan Naiya, Himanshu sacked the leading man and cast the gawky and reluctant Ashok Kumar as the leading man. Kumar went on to have a successful career in films.

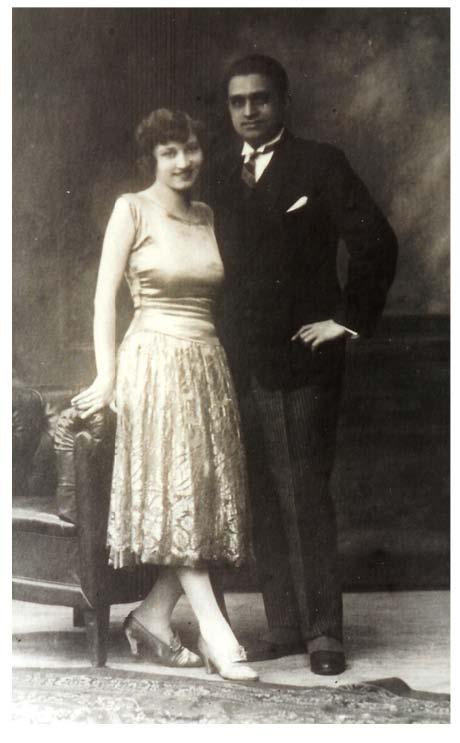
Mary Hainlin with Himansu Rai, c 1920s. Image courtesy Peter Dietze.

After Rai's death, there was a struggle for studio control. His widow Devika Rani was in conflict with Sashadhar Mukherjee. Eventually there was dual control and alternate production of films by the two camps. During this era Mukherjee produced the studio's biggest hit Kismet in 1943. Then Mukherjee broke away to form Filmistan Studio in partnership, and Devika Rani, fully in charge of the studio, did not have as much success.

In 1945, Devika Rani married Svetoslav Roerich and moved away from Bombay and films. Ashok Kumar and Mukherjee made a bid to revive Bombay talkies and produced one big hit in Mahal. Eventually, the studio shut down and is now a decrepit property in Malad.

== Filmography ==
=== Producer ===
- Kangan (1939) / The Bangle (English title)
- Izzat (1937)
- Jeevan Prabhat (1937)
- Savitri (1937)
- Achhut Kanya (1936) / Untouchable Girl (English title)
- Janmabhoomi (1936)
- Jeevan Naiya (1936)
- Jawani Ki Hawa (1935) / Leichtsinn der Jugend (Germany title)
- Karma (1933)
- Prapancha Pash (1929) / A Throw of Dice (English title) / Schicksalswürfel (Germany title)
- Shiraz (1928) / Grabmal einer großen Liebe (Germany title)

=== Actor ===
- Karma (1933)
- Prapancha Pash (1929) / A Throw of Dice (English title) / Schicksalswürfel (Germany title)
- Shiraz (1928) / Grabmal einer großen Liebe (Germany title)
- Prem Sanyas (1925) / Leuchte Asiens (Germany title)

=== Writer ===
- Achhut Kanya (1936) / Untouchable Girl (English title)

=== Director ===
- Prem Sanyas (1925) / Leuchte Asiens (Germany title)
