= Mumtaz Ali =

Indian dancer and actor (1905–1974)

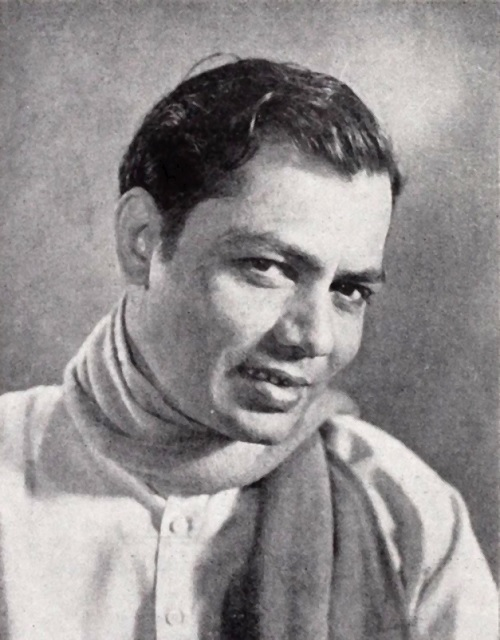
- Born: 29 September 1902; Madras, Madras Presidency, British India
- Died: 7 February 1975 (aged 72); Bangalore, Karnataka, India
- Occupation: Actor
- Spouse: Latif-un-nisa Ali
- Children: 8, including Mehmood Ali, Minoo Mumtaz and Anwar Ali

Mumtaz Ali (29 September 1902 – 7 February 1975) was an Indian dancer and character actor in Hindi cinema from the 1940s to 1970s. He was the father of Indian actor Mehmood. He also had his own dance troupe "Mumtaz Ali Nites" which performed all over India. However, his career suffered due to excessive drinking, and his family faced financial difficulties. As a result, his son Mehmood began working as a child artist, while his daughter Minoo Mumtaz worked as a dancer in his stage shows and later appeared in films.

== Early life ==
Mumtaz Ali was born in Madras in 1905. Orphaned very early, he was raised by his nine-year-old sister Karimunnisa. Around 1928, he lived on the streets in Bombay when he met Benjamin Guy Horniman, an Englishman amateur of Indian cinema and former publisher of the Bombay Chronicle. B. G. Horniman took him in, invited him to his home and supported him financially. Mumtaz Ali founded at that time a small troupe of street theater, the Mumtaz Ali Theatrical Company, for which he plays almost all roles. In 1933, Horniman recommended Mumtaz Ali to Himanshu Rai who was establishing the Bombay Talkies studio in Malad, the suburbs of Bombay.

== Career ==
Mumtaz Ali joined Bombay Talkies from the first movie of the studio. He was a part of the production team of Jawani Ki Hawa which was released in 1935. But he had to wait the next year to appear on the screen on the third film, Achhut Kanya. Among his best work was his song "Mein to Dilli se Dulhan laya re" from the 1942 film Jhula. This song was a must to be played at all marriage functions in those days in Mumbai and India. Mumtaz Ali sided with Devika Rani during the Bombay Talkies split in early 1943. He decided to leave the studio in 1945, when Devika Rani left him.

== Later Years and Death ==
He was last seen in the 1974 Hindi movie Kunwara Baap, directed by and starring his son Mehmood in the song "Saj Rahi Gali Meri Maa". He died the next year on 7 February, aged 72.

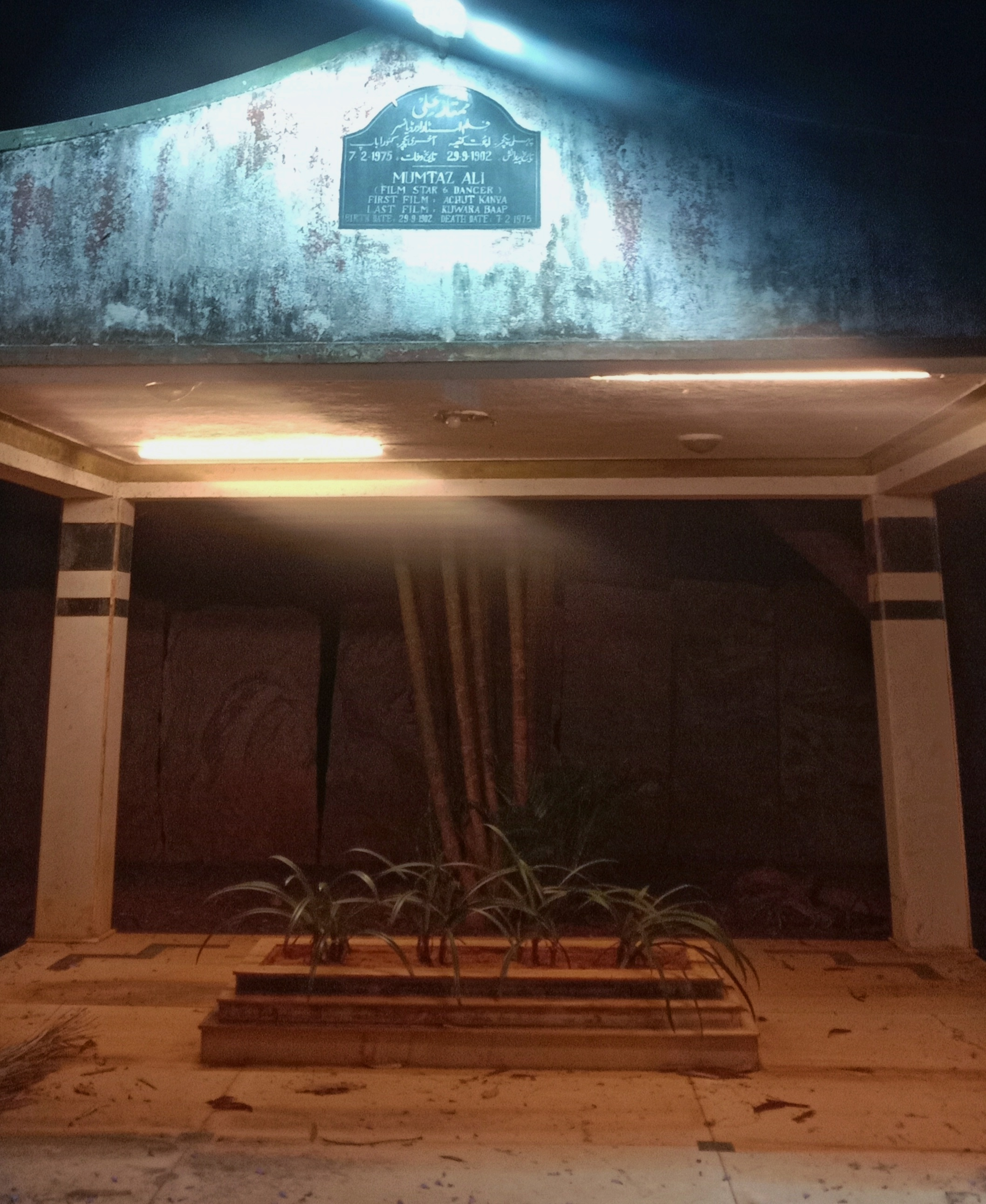
Grave of Mumtaz Ali with plaque visible.

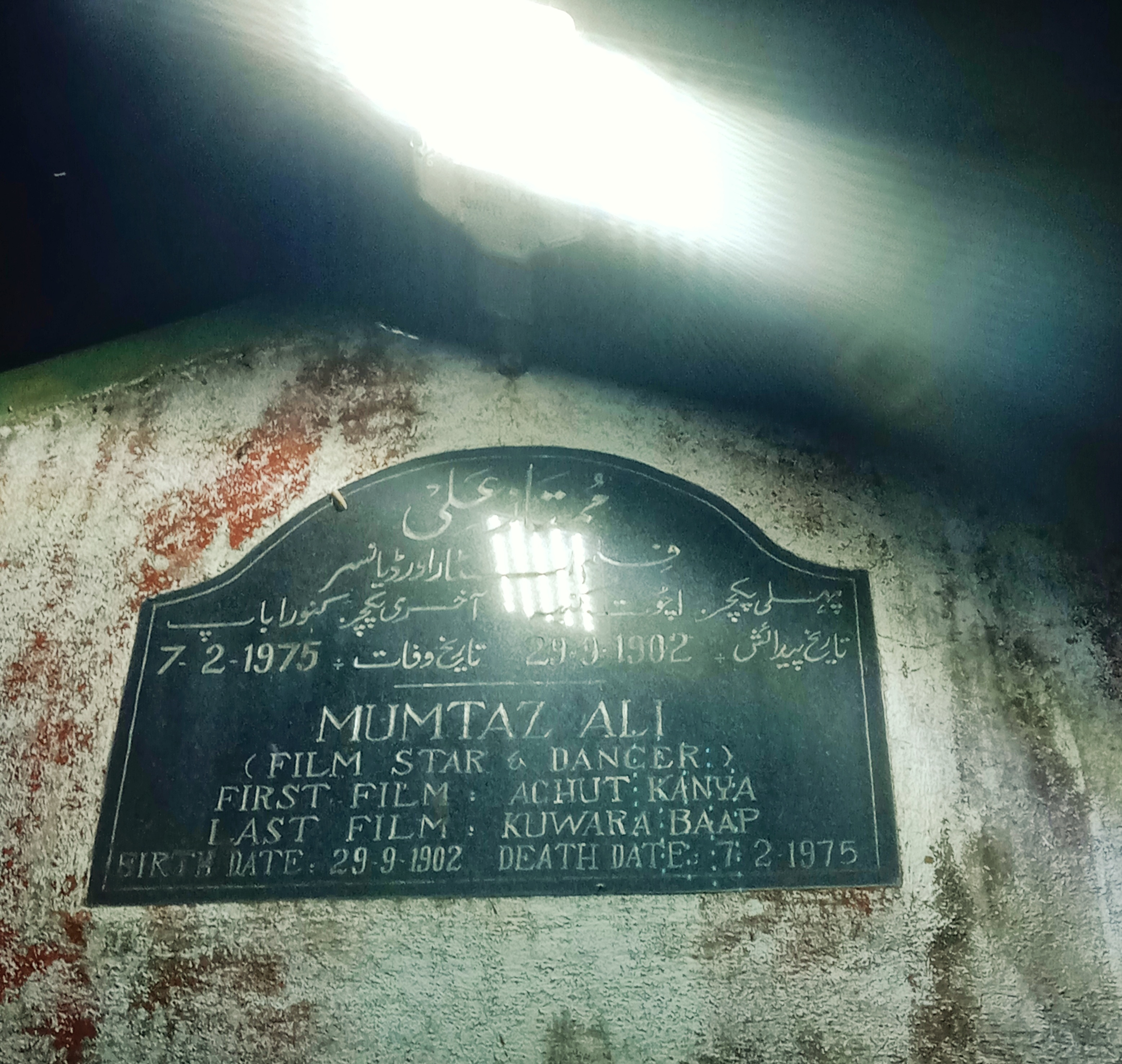
Grave plaque of Mumtaz Ali showing his birth and death dates.

== Personal life ==
Mumtaz Ali married Latifunnisa, in October 1929. They had eight children: Husseini, Mehmood, Khairunnisa, Usman, Malikunnisa ( Minoo Mumtaz ), Zubeida, Shaukat and Anwar. Mehmood made his acting debut in Kismet (1943). Minoo Mumtaz made her stage debut for Mumtaz Ali Nites and became a recognized dancer in Indian cinema in the 1950s.

== Filmography ==
Year	Film	Character/Role
1998	Ghar Bazar	
1975	Dayar E Madina	
1974	Kunwara Baap	
1974	Do Phool	
1959	Dil Deke Dekho	
1955	Sakhi Hatim	
1952	Kafila	
1950	Apni Chhaya	
1950	Nirala	Rani
1950	Sangeeta	
1949	Putli	
1948	Khidki	
1948	Padmini	
1948	Shakti	
1948	Mulaqat	
1947	Shehnai	
1943	Hamari Baat	
1942	Basant	Dilip
1941	Jhoola	Postman
1940	Azad	
1940	Punar Milan	
1939	Navjeevan	
1938	Nirmala	
1938	Vachan	
1937	Jeevan Prabhat	Nandlal
1937	Prem Kahani	Mr. Sharma
1937	Savitri	
1936	Janmabhoomi	Madhu

== See also ==
- Mehmood Ali Family
- Minoo Mumtaz
- Mehmood Ali
- Anwar Ali
- Lucky Ali
- List of Hindi film clans

== Gallery ==
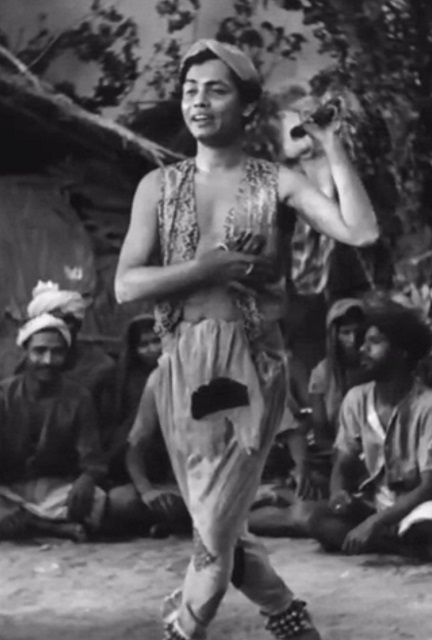
Mumtaz Ali in 1938 film Nirmala

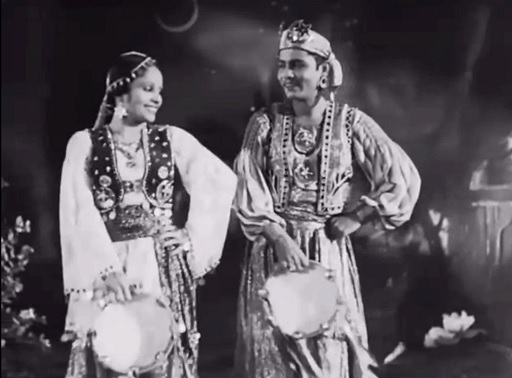
With Sunita Devi in 1937 film Prem Kahani
