= Ashok Kumar filmography =

Ashok Kumar was an Indian actor who was active from 1934 to 1997.

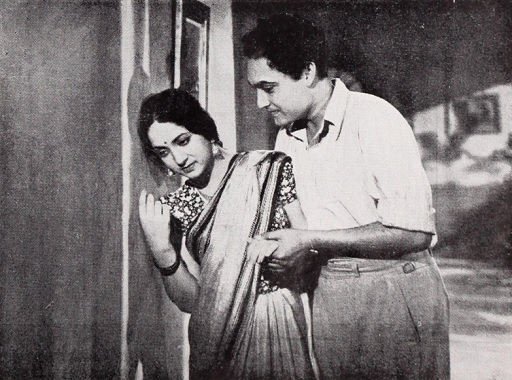
With Mumtaz Shanti in Kismet (1943)

== Filmography ==
Year	Title	Role	Notes
1936	Jeevan Naiya	Ranjit	
1936	Janmabhoomi	Ajay	
1936	Achhut Kanya	Pratap	
1937	Izzat	Kanhaiya	
1937	Prem Kahani	Jagat Narayan	
1937	Savitri	Satyavan	
1938	Nirmala	Ramdas	
1938	Vachan		
1939	Kangan	Vaikartana Siyaram	
1940	Anjaan	Ajit	
1940	Azad	Vijay	
1940	Bandhan	Nirmal	
1941	Jhoola	Ramesh	
1941	Naya Sansar	Puran	
1942	Zindagi		
1943	Angoothi		
1943	Kismet	Shekhar alias Madan	
1943	Najma	Yusuf Khan	
1944	Chal Chal Re Naujawan		
1944	Kiran	Shankar	
1945	Begum		
1945	Humayun	Emperor Humayun	
1946	Eight Days	Shamsher Singh	
1946	Shikari		
1946	Uttara Abhimanyu		
1947	Chandrashekhar	Pratap	Bengali film
1947	Sajan	Prakash	
1948	Padmini		
1949	Mahal	Hari Shankar	
1950	Aadhi Raat		
1950	Khiladi		
1950	Mashaal	Samar	
1950	Nishana	Mohan	
1950	Samadhi	Shekhar	
1950	Sangram	Kunwar Rajendra K. Singh "Raje"	
1951	Afsana	Rattan Kumar alias Ashok Kumar and Chaman Kumar	Double Role
1951	Deedar	Dr. Kishore	
1952	Tamasha	Himself	
1952	Saloni		
1952	Raag Rang		
1952	Poonam	Rajan	
1952	Nau Bahar	Ashok	Also Co-producer
1952	Kafila		
1952	Jalpari		
1952	Bewafa	Ashok	
1952	Betaab		
1953	Nagma		
1953	Shole : A Tale of Burning Tears	Dr. Roy	
1953	Parineeta	Shekhar Rai	
1953	Samsheer		
1954	Samaj		
1954	Naaz		
1954	Lakirein		
1954	Baadbaan		
1955	Sardar		
1955	Bhagwat Mahima		
1955	Bandish	Kamal Roy	
1956	Ek Hi Raasta	Prakash Mehta	
1956	Satranj	Shanti Swaroop	
1956	Bhai-Bhai	Ashok Kumar	
1956	Inspector	Shyam	
1957	Mr. X	Ashok Kumar alias Mr. X	
1957	Talaash	Ajay Kumar Singh	
1957	Jeevan Saathi		
1957	Bandi	Shankar Mishra	
1957	Ustad		
1957	Sheroo		
1957	Ek Saal	Suresh Kumar	
1958	Karigar	Shankar Mohite	
1958	Light House		
1958	Sitaron Se Aagey	Rajesh	
1958	Night Club	Kishore	
1958	Raagini	Juggal	Also Co-producer
1958	Sone Ki Chidiya	Himself	Guest Appearance
1958	Chalti Ka Naam Gaadi	Brijmohan Sharma	
1958	Savera	Kundan	
1958	Howrah Bridge	Prem Kumar alias Rakesh	
1958	Farishta	Ashok	
1959	Dhool Ka Phool	Jagdish Chandra	Uncredited
1959	Nai Raahen		
1959	Naach Ghar		
1959	Kangan	Sharad Das	
1959	Daaka		
1959	Bedard Zamana Kya Jane	Ashok	
1959	Baap Bete		
1960	Kanoon	Badri Prasad and his lookalike	Double role
1960	Masoom	Khan	
1960	Kalpana	Amar	
1960	Kala Aadmi	Madan	
1960	Hospital	Shaibal	Bengali film
1960	Aanchal	Ramu	
1961	Dharmputra	Nawab Badruddin	Uncredited
1961	Warrant		
1961	Flat No. 9		
1961	Dark Street		
1961	Karodpati	Ashok	Special Appearance
1962	Hong Kong	Bakshi	
1962	Banto	Doctor	Punjabi film
1962	Issi Ka Naam Duniya Hai	Raja	
1962	Umeed	Jwala Prasad	
1962	Rakhi	Raj Kumar 'Raju'	
1962	Private Secretary	Shambabu	
1962	Naqli Nawab	Nawab Shauqat Ali	
1962	Mehndi Lagi Mere Haath	Dr. Mehta	
1962	Burmah Road	Ashok	
1962	Bezuban	Dharam Das	
1962	Aarti	Dr. Prakash	
1963	Ustadon Ke Ustad	Saaya	
1963	Gumrah	Ashok	
1963	Gharni Shobha		
1963	Bandini	Vikas Ghosh	
1963	Aaj Aur Kal	Maharaja Balvir Singh	
1963	Yeh Rastey Hain Pyar Ke	Advocate Byomkesh Mukherjee	
1963	Meri Surat Teri Ankhen	Pyare	
1963	Mere Mehboob	Nawab Buland Akhtar Changezi	
1963	Grahasti	Harishchandra Khanna	
1964	Benazir	Nawab	
1964	Pooja Ke Phool	Choudhury Hukumat Rai	
1964	Phoolon Ki Sej	Dr. Verma	
1964	Dooj Ka Chand	Anand	
1964	Chitralekha	Yogi Kumargiri	
1965	Chand Aur Suraj	Chanderprakash Atmaram Malik 'Chander'	
1965	Aadhi Raat Ke Baad	Ashok Kumar	
1965	Oonche Log	Chandrakant	
1965	Shevatcha Malusura		Marathi film
1965	Naya Kanoon	Shekhar	
1965	Bheegi Raat	Anand	
1965	Bahu Beti	Judge	
1965	Akashdeep	Shankar Gupta (Guptaji)	
1966	Afsana	Gopal	
1966	Mamta	Manish Roy	
1966	Yeh Zindagi Kitni Haseen Hai	Gupta	
1966	Toofan Mein Pyaar Kahan	Shyamu	
1966	Daadi Maa	Pratap alias Raja	
1966	Annavin Asai	Judge	Tamil film
1967	Jewel Thief	Arjun Singh	
1967	Nai Roshni	Professor Kumar	
1967	Mehrban	Shanti Swarup	
1967	Hatey Bazarey	Dr. Anaadi Mukherjee	Bengali Movie
1967	Bahu Begum	Nawab Sikander Mirza	
1968	Dil Aur Mohabbat	Chowdhury	
1968	Aabroo	Advocate P.K. Anand	
1968	Sadhu Aur Shaitaan	Passenger (Hair Dresser)	Uncredited
1968	Ek Kali Muskai	Chaudhary	
1968	Aashirwad	Shivnath 'Jogi Thakur' Choudhary	
1969	Pyar Ka Sapna	Shankarnath	
1969	Beti Tumhare Jaisi		
1969	Aradhana	Ganguly	
1969	Satyakam	Satyasharan 'Dadji' Acharya	
1969	Paisa Ya Pyaar	Mohanlal	
1969	Intaquam	Heeralal Mehra	
1969	Do Bhai	Judge Ajay Verma	
1969	Bhai Bahen	Raja Vikram Pratap	
1969	Aansoo Ban Gaye Phool	Vidyanand	
1970	Sau Saal Beet Gaye	Digvijay Singh / Nahar Singh	
1970	Maa Aur Mamta	William	
1970	Sharafat	Jagatram	
1970	Safar	Dr. Chander	
1970	Purab Aur Pachhim	Guruji	
1970	Jawab	Zamindar Uma Shankar	
1971	Kangan	Lakshmipati 'Rajaji'	
1971	Adhikar	Shukla	
1971	Naya Zamana	Sachin Choudhury (Rajan & Seema's Father)	
1971	Hum Tum Aur Woh	Mahendranath	
1971	Ganga Tera Pani Amrit	Manju's Father	
1971	Door Ka Raahi	Joseph	
1971	Guddi	Himself	
1972	Pakeezah	Shahabuddin	
1972	Garam Masala	Maharaj	Uncredited
1972	Anuraag	Rai Sahib Shiv Shankar Rai	
1972	Victoria No. 203	Raja	
1972	Zindagi Zindagi	Choudhury Ramprasad	
1972	Zameen Aasmaan	Shanti Swaroop	
1972	Sazaa		
1972	Rakhi Aur Hathkadi	Thakur Virendra Singh	
1972	Sa-Re-Ga-Ma-Pa	Jaggu alias Raghuveer Sahay	
1972	Rani Mera Naam		
1972	Maalik	Ganesh Duttji 'Guru'	
1972	Dil Daulat Duniya	Seth Kalidas / Kalluram 'Kalwa'	Double Role
1973	Dhund	Mehta	
1973	Bada Kabutar	Mama Rampuri	
1973	Taxi Driver		
1973	Hifazat	Asha's Foster Father	
1974	Do Phool	Diwan Bahadur Atal Rai	
1974	Bhoomi Kosam	Jagadeeswara Bhoopathi	Telugu Film
1974	Khoon Ki Keemat		
1974	Prem Nagar	Raja Uday Singh	
1974	Ujala Hi Ujala	Professor Shyamlal Gupta	
1974	Paise Ki Gudiya	Dr. Vinayak	
1974	Love in Bombay	Ushman Bhai	
1974	Dulhan		
1974	Do Aankhen		
1975	Chori Mera Kaam	Shankar	
1975	Aakraman		
1975	Mili	Mr. Khanna	
1975	Ek Mahal Ho Sapno Ka	Anand Kumar	
1975	Uljhan	Judge Kailash Chander	
1975	Dafaa 302		
1976	Chhoti Si Baat	Colonel Julius Nagendranath Wilfred Singh	
1976	Bhanwar	Dr. Verma	
1976	Shankar Dada	Superintendent of Police	
1976	Balika Badhu	Aged Amal	Voice
1976	Ek Se Badhkar Ek	Raja	
1976	Suntan	Dinanath	
1976	Rangila Ratan		
1976	Harfan Maulaa	Ranjeet / Kedar / Mahavir	
1976	Ha Khel Sawalyancha	Mr. Thorat	Marathi Film
1976	Barood	Balraj Gupta - Criminologist	
1976	Arjun Pandit	Dr. Shukla	
1976	Aap Beati	Kishorilal Kapoor	
1977	Jadu Tona	Jolly Goodman	
1977	Dream Girl	Mr. Verma	
1977	Hira Aur Patthar	Dr. Anand	
1977	Ananda Ashram	Pratap Narayan Roychoudhary	Bengali film
1977	Prayashchit		
1977	Mastan Dada		
1977	Anurodh	Mr. Mathur	
1977	Chala Murari Hero Banne	Ramel	
1977	Safed Jhooth	Baldevraj Gulati	
1978	Bahadur Jiska Naam		
1978	Do Musafir	Kailash Nath	
1978	Phool Khile Hain Gulshan Gulshan	Lala Ganpat Rai	
1978	Anpadh	Gupta	
1978	Apna Khoon	Geeta's Father	
1978	Dil Aur Deewaar	Rai Saheb	
1978	Chor Ke Ghar Chor	Ranjeet Singh	
1978	Tumhare Liye	Dr. Vachaspati / Vaidyaraj	
1978	Premi Gangaram		
1978	Khatta Meetha	Homi Mistry	
1978	Anmol Tasveer		
1979	Guru Ho Jaa Shuru	CBI Inspector / Chief Kumar	
1979	Janta Hawaldar		
1979	Bagula Bhagat		
1979	Amar Deep		
1980	Khubsoorat	Dwarka Prasad Gupta	
1980	Khwab	Joshi	
1980	Aap Ke Deewane	Inshallah Khan	
1980	Takkar	Zamindar (Vijay, Kishan, Meena's Father)	
1980	Jyoti Bane Jwala	Dr. Bose	
1980	Sau Din Saas Ke	Colonel Gupta	
1980	Saajan Mere Main Saajan Ki		
1980	Nazrana Pyar Ka	Mahesh Kumar Gupta	
1980	Judaai	Umakant Verma	
1980	Aakhri Insaaf		
1981	Yeh Kaisa Nashaa Hai		
1981	Pyar To Hona Hi Tha		
1981	Jail Yatra	Ramnath Verma	
1981	Mahfil	Raghunath Singh	
1981	Maan Gaye Ustaad	Jailor	
1981	Jyoti	Zamindar (Govind & Niranjan's Father)	
1982	Patthar Ki Lakeer		
1982	Dial 100	Shanti's Husband	
1982	Shoukheeen	Om Prakash Choudhury	
1982	Heeron Ka Chor	Mr. Khanna	
1982	Shakti	Police Commissioner	Cameo
1982	Anokha Bandhan	Zamindar	
1982	Swarna Mahal		
1982	Sumbandh	Advocate Hardayal Mathur	
1982	Mehndi Rang Layegi		
1982	Dard Ka Rishta	Premchand Bharadwaj	
1982	Chalti Ka Naam Zindagi		
1983	Farz Ki Keemat		
1983	Taqdeer	Diwan Pratap Singh	Uncredited
1983	Prem Tapasya	Dr. Chowdary	
1983	Love in Goa	Baburao	
1983	Mahaan	Mr. Rai (Rita's Grandfather)	
1983	Pasand Apni Apni	Shantilal Anand	
1983	Dard Ka Rishta	Premchand Bharadwaj	
1983	Kaya Palat		
1983	Haadsaa	Dr. Ved Kapoor	
1983	Chor Police	Mr. Sinha	
1983	Bekaraar	Pradeep's father	
1984	Prerana		
1984	Farishta	Rai Bahadur	
1984	Ram Tera Desh	Ram Das	
1984	Duniya	R. D. Puri	
1984	Shilalipi		
1984	Raja Aur Rana	Rajinder Singh (Raja)	
1984	Hum Rahe Na Hum	Mulk Raj	
1984	Grahasthi	Shankar	
1984	Akalmand	Major	
1985	Tawaif	Mr. Nigam	
1985	Bhago Bhut Aaya	Butler Anthony D'Souza	
1985	Durgaa	Dinanath	
1985	Ek Daku Saher Mein	Police Inspector	
1985	Phir Aayee Barsat	Bajaj - Dilip's father	
1986	Qatl	Beggar / Street Singer	
1986	Amma		
1986	Pyar Kiya Hai Pyar Karenge	Abdul Rehman	
1986	Asli Naqli	Driver / Chacha	
1986	Shatru	Superintendent of Police	
1986	Inteqam Ki Aag	Shobha's father	
1987	Woh Din Aayega	Bhattacharya	
1987	Mr. India	Professor Sinha	
1987	Awam	Veshat Ansari	
1987	Hifazat	Kailashnath	
1987	Watan Ke Rakhwale	Peter Fernandes	
1987	Superman	Superman's Foster Father	
1987	Pyaar Ki Jeet	Dr. Kumar	
1987	Jawab Hum Denge	Defense Lawyer	
1988	Inteqam	Raghuveer	
1988	Faisla	Rehman	
1989	Clerk	Satyapati	
1989	Anjaane Rishte	Kirpa Ram	
1989	Dana Paani	Sinha	
1989	Sachai Ki Taqat		
1989	Mamata Ki Chhaon Mein		
1990	Majboor	Ravi and Sunil's Father	
1990	Naya Zamana Nai Kranti		
1991	Begunaah	Dindayal	
1991	Maut Ki Sazaa	Satyadev	
1991	Aadhi Mimansa		
1992	Humlaa	Devkishan Sharma	
1992	Surer Bhubane		
1993	Kanyadan		
1993	Prathama		
1993	Aasoo Bane Angaarey		
1994	Yuhi Kabhi	God	
1995	Sajan Ka Dard		
1995	Mera Damad	Ajit Khanna	
1995	Jamla Ho Jamla	Balaji Ghorpade	Marathi film
1996	Dushman Duniya Ka	Doctor	
1996	Beqabu	Daddu, Raja's Mentor	
1996	Return of Jewel Thief	Prince Arjun Singh	
1997	Ankhon Mein Tum Ho	Kapoor (Daddu)	
1997	Achena Atithi	Kapoor	final film role
2013	Love in Bombay	Usman	Posthumous release, originally made in 1971

== Television ==
Year	Serial	Role	Notes
1984–1985	Hum Log	Narrator	
1986	Katha Sagar		
1986	Bahadur Shah Zafar	Bahadur Shah Zafar	
1986	Dada Dadi Ki Kahaniyan		
1986	Hum Hindustani		
1987	Ramayan	Himself	Narrator in first episode
1988	Crossroads	Ranjit Rupal	
1990–1991	Bheem Bhavani	Bheem	
1993	Ujale Ki Ore		
1994	Tehkikaat	Dada-	Episode "Murder after Lucky Draw"
