= List of Hindi films of 1970 =

The following is a list of films produced by the Hindi film industry in 1970:

== Highest-grossing films ==
These are the highest-grossing Hindi films of 1970. Gross collection figures are domestic, unless otherwise noted.

Rank	Title	Gross collection	Notes
1	Johny Mera Naam	₹8 crore	
2	Sachaa Jhutha	₹5.50 crore	
3	Gopi	₹5.44 crore	Worldwide gross
4	Aan Milo Sajna	₹5 crore	
5	Talash	₹4.78 crore	Worldwide gross
6	Jeevan Mrityu	₹4 crore	
7	Aadmi Aur Insaan	₹3.82 crore	Worldwide gross
8	Dharti	₹3.51 crore	Worldwide gross
9	Khilona	₹3.50 crore	
10	Safar	₹3.49 crore	Worldwide gross

== A-Z ==
Title	Director	Cast	Genre	Sources
Aan Milo Sajna	Mukul Dutt	Asha Parekh, Rajesh Khanna, Vinod Khanna	Drama	2
Aansoo Aur Muskan	P. Madhavan	Kishore Kumar, Hema Malini, Bindu, Padmini	Drama	3
Abhinetri	Subodh Mukherjee	Shashi Kapoor, Hema Malini, Deb Mukherjee	Drama	4
Bachpan	Kotayya Pratyagatma	Sanjeev Kumar, Tanuja	Drama	5
Bhagwan Parshuram	Babubhai Mistri	Abhi Bhattacharya, Jayshree Gadkar	Drama	6
Bhai-Bhai	Raja Nawathe	Sunil Dutt, Asha Parekh, Mumtaz, Pran	Drama	7
Bombay Talkie	James Ivory	Shashi Kapoor, Jennifer Kendal	Drama	8
Chetna	B.R. Ishara	Shatrughan Sinha, Rehana Sultan, Laxmi Chahya, Nadira, Anil Dhawan	Action	9
Choron Ka Chor	Mohammed Hussain	Dara Singh, Shabnam, Madan Puri	Drama	10
Darpan	Adurthi Subba Rao	Sunil Dutt, Waheeda Rehman	Drama	11
Dastak	Rajinder Singh Bedi	Sanjeev Kumar, Rehana Sultan, Anju Mahendra	Drama	12
Deedar	Jugal Kishore	Dheeraj Kumar, Anjana Choudhury	Drama	13
Devi	Madhusudan Rao V.	Nutan, Sanjeev Kumar, Madan Puri	Drama	14
Dharti	Sridhar	Rajendra Kumar, Waheeda Rehman, Sivaji Ganesan	Action	15
Ehsan	Shiv Kumar	Helen, Joy Mukherjee, Anjana, Aruna Irani	Drama	16
Ek Nanhi Munni Ladki Thi	Vishram Bedekar	Prithviraj Kapoor, Shatrugan Sinha, Mumtaz, Helen	Drama	17
Ganwaar	Naresh Kumar	Vyjayanthimala, Rajendra Kumar, Pran	Romance	18
Geet	Ramanand Sagar	Rajendra Kumar, Mala Sinha, Sujeet Kumar	Drama	19
Ghar Ghar Ki Kahani	T. Prakash Rao	Balraj Sahni, Nirupa Roy, Rakesh Roshan, Bharathi Vishnuvardhan	Drama	20
Gopi	A. Bhimsingh	Dilip Kumar, Saira Banu, Om Prakash, Pran		21
Gunah Aur Kanoon	B.R. Ishara	Sanjeev Kumar, Kum Kum, Prithviraj Kapoor	Drama	22
Heer Raanjha	Chetan Anand	Prithviraj Kapoor, Raaj Kumar, Sonia Sahni, Pran	Romance	23
Himmat	Ravikant Nagaich	Jeetendra, Mumtaz, Prem Chopra	Romance	24
Holi Ayee Re	Harsukh Jagneshwar Bhatt	Shatrughan Sinha, Mala Sinha	Romance	25
Humjoli	Ramanna	Jeetendra, Leena Chandavarkar, Pran	Comedy	26
Insaan Aur Shaitan	Aspi Irani	Sanjeev Kumar, Faryal, Aruna Irani	Action	27
Inspector	Chand	Helen, Joy Mukherjee, Alka	Action	28
Ishq Par Zor Nahin	Ramesh Saigal	Dharmendra, Sadhana Shivdasani	Romance	29
Jawab	Ramaana	Mehmood, Jeetendra, Meena Kumari, Leena Candavarkhar, Aruna Irani, Prem Chopra	Romance	30
Jeevan Mrityu	Satyen Bose	Dharmendra, Raakhee	Romance	31
Johny Mera Naam	Vijay Anand	Dev Anand, Hema Malini, Pran, Prem Nath	Crime Drama	32
Kab? Kyoon? Aur Kahan?	Anil Hingorani	Dharmendra, Babita, Pran	Mystery	33
Khilona	Chander Vohra	Jeetendra, Mumtaz, Sanjeev Kumar	Romance	34
Maa Aur Mamta	Asit Sen	Nutan, Jeetendra, Mumtaz, Ashok Kumar	Drama	35
Maa Ka Aanchal	Jagdev Bhambri	Sanjeev Kumar, Leela Mishra	Drama	36
Maharaja	Naresh Saigal	Sanjay Khan, Nutan, Nirupa Roy	Drama	37
Man Ki Aankhen	Raghunath Jhalani	Dharmendra, Waheeda Rehman	Drama	38
Mastana	Adurthi Subba Rao	Mehmood Ali, Vinod Khanna, Bharathi Vishnuvardhan	Comedy	39
Mera Naam Joker	Raj Kapoor	Raj Kapoor, Rajendra Kumar, Manoj Kumar, Dharmendra, Simi Garewal, Rishi Kapoor	Drama, Musical	40
Mere Humsafar	Dulal Guha	Jeetendra, Sharmila Tagore	Romance	41
Moojrim	Kewal Misra	Joy Mukherjee, Kumud Chuggani	Action	42
My Love	S. Sukhdev	Shashi Kapoor, Sharmila Tagore	Romance	43
Nanak Dukhiya Sub Sansar	Dara Singh	Dara Singh, Balraj Sahni, Prithviraj Kapoor, Pran, Mumtaz	Drama	44
Naya Raasta	Khalid Akhtar	Jeetendra, Asha Parekh, Farida Jalal	Drama	45
Pagla Kahin Ka	Shakti Samanta	Shammi Kapoor, Asha Parekh	Romance	46
Pardesi	Kundan Kumar	Mumtaz, Biswajeet, Sujit Kumar	Drama	47
Pavitra Paapi	Rajendra Bhatia	Balraj Sahni, Tanuja	Drama	48
Pehchan	Sohanlal Kanwar	Manoj Kumar, Babita	Romance	49
Prem Pujari	Dev Anand	Dev Anand, Waheeda Rehman, Shatrughan Sinha	Romance	50
Purab Aur Paschim	Manoj Kumar	Manoj Kumar, Saira Banu, Bharathi Vishnuvardhan, Madan Puri, Pran, Prem Chopra	Drama	51
Puraskar	Ram Kumar	Joy Mukherjee, Farida Jalal, Helen	Action	52
Pushpanjali	Kishore Sahu	Sanjay Khan, Faryal, Prem Nath	Drama	53
Raaton Ka Raja	Rajesh Nahta	Dheeraj Kumar, Shatrughan Sinha	Drama	54
Rootha Na Karo	Sunder Dar	Shashi Kapoor, Aruna Irani, Nanda	Romance	55
Saas Bhi Kabhi Bahu Thi	V. Madhusudan Rao	Sanjay Khan, Leena Chandavarkar	Drama	56
Saat Phere	Sundar Dhar	Meena Kumari, Pradeep Kumar		
Sachaa Jhutha	Manmohan Desai	Rajesh Khanna, Mumtaz, Vinod Khanna	Drama	57
Safar	Asit Sen	Sharmila Tagore, Ashok Kumar, Rajesh Khanna, Feroz Khan	Drama	58
Samaj Ko Badal Dalo	Madhusudan Rao V.	Aruna Irani, Sharada, Pran	Drama	59
Sampoorna Teerth Yatra	Dhirubhai Desai	Jaymala, Jeevan	Drama	60
Sawan Bhadon	Mohan Segal	Rekha, Navin Nischol	Drama	61
Sharafat	Asit Sen	Ashok Kumar, Dharmendra, Hema Malini	Romance, Drama	62
Soldier Thakur Daler Singh	Shyam	Ajit Singh Deol, Dharmendra, Deepa, Om Prakash, Kumar Ajit, Mehmood		63
Suhana Safar	Vijay	Shashi Kapoor, Sharmila Tagore	Drama	64
The Train	Ravikant Nagaich	Rajesh Khanna, Nanda, Helen, Madan Puri	Drama	65
Truck Driver	Dharam Kumar	Mohan Choti, Dev Kumar, Helen.		66
Tum Haseen Main Jawaan	Bhappi Sonie	Dharmendra, Hema Malini, Helen, Pran	Romance	67
Umang	Atma Ram	Subhash Ghai, Satish Kumar	Drama	68
Yaadgaar	S. Ram Sharma	Nutan, Manoj Kumar, Prem Chopra, Madan Puri, Pran	Drama	69

== See also ==
- List of Hindi films of 1969
- List of Hindi films of 1971
