= List of Hindi films of 1968 =

A list of films produced by the Bollywood film industry based in Mumbai in 1968:

== Highest-grossing films ==
The ten highest-grossing films at the Indian box office in 1968:

Rank	Title	Gross collection
1	Ankhen	₹6.5 crore
2	Do Kaliyaan	₹4 crore
3	Neel Kamal	₹3.5 crore
4	Kanyadaan	₹3.2 crore
5	Shikar	₹3 crore
6	Padosan	₹2.8 crore
7	Brahmachari	₹2.5 crore
8	Aadmi	₹2 crore
9	Haseena Maan Jayegi	₹1.9 crore
10	Duniya	₹1.8 crore

== A-C ==
Title	Director	Cast	Genre	Music
Aa Jaa Sanam	Yusuf Naqvi	Feroz Khan, Tanuja, Deven Verma	Drama	
Aabroo	C L Rawal	Deepak Kumar, Ashok Kumar, Vimi Tun Tun, Rehman, Jeevan, Mukri, Lalita Pawar, Nirupa Roy, Sunder	Romantic melodrama	Music: Sonik Omi; Lyrics: G. L. Rawal
Aadmi	A. Bhim Singh	Dilip Kumar, Manoj Kumar, Waheeda Rehman, Pran, Simi Garewal, Agha, Ulhas, Mohan Choti, Sulochana	Drama	Music: Naushad; Lyrics: Shakeel Badayuni
Aanchal Ke Phool	Karunesh Thakur	Kamini Kaushal, Jayant, Chand Usmani, Madan Puri, Jeevan, Sunder, Ulhas	Social Family Drama	Music: Ved Sethi; Lyrics: Naqsh Lyallpuri
Aashirwad	Hrishikesh Mukherjee	Ashok Kumar, Sanjeev Kumar, Sumita Sanyal, Sajjan, Veena, Harindranath Chattopadhyay, Sarika, Bipin Gupta, Ashim Kumar, Samar Roy, Abhi Bhattacharya	Family Melodrama	music: Vasant Desai; Lyrics: Harindranath Chattopadhyay, Gulzar
Ankhen	Ramanand Sagar	Dharmendra, Mala Sinha, Mehmood, Kumkum, Nazir Hussain, Sujit Kumar, Lalita Pawar, Daisy Irani	Thriller	Music: Ravi; Lyrics: Sahir Ludhianvi
Abhilasha	Amit Bose	Meena Kumari, Sanjay Khan, Nanda, Rehman, Murad, Agha, Mohan Choti, Sulochana	Family Drama	Music: R D Burman; Lyrics: Majrooh Sultanpuri
Anjam	Shiv Kumar	Feroz Khan, Shahida, Helen, N. A. Ansari, Sunder, Azad, Johnny Whisky, Jeevankala	Action Thriller	Music: Ganesh; Lyrics: Qamar Jalalabadi, Zafar Rahi, Akhtar Romani
Anokhi Raat	Asit Sen	Sanjeev Kumar, Zaheeda, Ajay Parikshit Sahni, Aruna Irani, Tarun Bose, Keshto Mukherjee, Mukri, Badri Prasad, Anwar	Drama	Music: Roshan; Lyrics: Indeevar
Apna Ghar Apni Kahani	Phani Majumdar	Shekhar, Bina Rai, Mumtaz, David, Sudhir, Bela Bose, Keshto Mukherjee, Madhumati	Social Family Drama	Music: N. Dutta; Lyrics: Qamar Jalalabadi
Aulad	Kundan Kumar	Jeetendra, Babita, Mehmood, Achala Sachdev, Aruna Irani, Helen, Jeevan, Nazir Hussain, Sujit Kumar, Manmohan, Sulochana Chatterjee	Family Drama	Music: Chitragupta; Lyrics: Majrooh Sultanpuri
Baazi	Moni Bhattacharya	Dharmendra, Waheeda Rehman, Mehmood, Nazir Hussain, Helen, Johnny Walker, Ulhas, N. A. Ansari, Manmohan, Amar	Suspense Thriller Romance	Music: Kalyanji Anandji; Lyrics: Shakeel Badayuni
Baharon Ki Manzil	Y. H. Rizvi	Dharmendra, Meena Kumari, Rehman, Farida Jalal, Tun Tun, Hashmi, Anwar Hussain, Wasti	Family Drama	Music: Laxmikant–Pyarelal; Lyrics: Majrooh Sultanpuri
Balram Shri Krishna	Chandrakant	Dara Singh, Savitri, Shahu Modak, Premnath, Jayshree Gadkar, Gitanjali, Aruna Irani, Randhawa	Mythology	Music: C. Ramchandra; Lyrics: Kavi Pradeep
Bambai Raat Ki Bahon Mein	K A Abbas	Persis Khambatta, Vimal Ahuja, Jalal Agha, Madhavi, Jeevan, Surekha, David, A. K. Hangal	Social	Music: J P Kaushik; Lyrics: Hasan Kamaal, Jalal Agha
Brahmachari	Bhappi Sonie	Shammi Kapoor, Rajshree, Pran, Mumtaz, Jagdeep, Dhumal, Mohan Choti, Asit Sen, Krishan Dhawan, Manmohan, Farida Dadi, Sachin Pilgaonkar, Mehmood Jr.	Social Drama	Music: Shankar Jaikishan; Lyrics: Hasrat Jaipuri, Shailendra
CID Agent 302	S. Azim	Azad, Indira Billi, Tun Tun, Ram Mohan, Narbada Shamkar, Sherry, Birju, Shakila Bano Bhopali, Baby Raje	Spy Thriller	Music: Iqbal; Lyrics: Aziz Gazi, Tabish Kanpuri

== D-H ==
Title	Director	Cast	Genre	Music
Dil Aur Mohabbat	Anand Datta	Joy Mukherjee, Sharmila Tagore, Ashok Kumar, K. N. Singh, Johnny Walker, Nazir Hussain, Bela Bose, Gajanan Jagirdar, Jankidas, Anoop Kumar, Sachin Pilgaonkar, Purnima, Tun Tun	Thriller Suspense Romance	Music: O P Nayyar; Lyrics: Aziz Kashmiri, Shewan Rizvi, S. H. Bihari, Verma Malik
Do Dooni Char	Debu Sen	Kishore Kumar, Tanuja, Iftekhar, Asit Sen, Surekha, Rashid Khan, Neetu Singh, Lata Arora, Chandrima Bhaduri	Comedy Drama	Music: Hemant Kumar; Lyrics: Gulzar
Do Kaliyaan	R. Krishnan, S. Panju	Biswajeet, Mala Sinha, Mehmood, Baby Soniya (Neetu Singh), Om Prakash, Nigar Sultana, Bharathi, Shabnam, Sonia Sahni, Manorama	Comedy Family Drama	Music: Ravi; Lyrics: Sahir Ludhianvi
Duniya	T. Prakash Rao	Dev Anand, Vyjayanthimala, Balraj Sahni, Prem Chopra, Johnny Walker, Madan Puri, Lalita Pawar, Nana Palsikar, Laxmi Chhaya, Jagdish Raj, Sulochana	Romantic Thriller	Music: Shankar Jaikishan; Lyrics: Hasrat Jaipuri, S. H. Bihari and Gopaldas Neeraj
Ek Kali Muskai	Vasant Joglekar	Ashok Kumar, Joy Mukherjee, Meera Joglekar, Nirupa Roy, Om Prakash, Mehmood, Lalita Pawar, Bina, Nana Palsikar, Sunder, Malika	Romance Social Drama	Music: Madan Mohan; Lyrics: Rajendra Krishan
Ek Phool Ek Bhool	Kedar Kapoor	Dev Kumar, Zeb Rehman, Jayanti, K. N. Singh, Madan Puri, Helen, Sudhir, Sunder, Dulari, Narmada Shankar, Ram Mohan	Social	Music: Usha Khanna; Lyrics: Indeevar
Ek Raat	Rajnath	Sheikh Mukhtar, Simi, Ravi Kumar, Madan Puri, Shyama, David, Samson, Laxmi Chhaya, Helen, Nazir Kashmiri	Suspense Thriller	Music: Usha Khanna; Lyrics: Yogesh, Jalal Malihabadi, Anjaan
Fareb	Jugal Kishore	Dev Kumar, Faryal, Bela Bose, Maruti, Rajan Haksar, Kundan, Sushma, N. A. Ansari	Thriller	Music: Usha Khanna; Lyrics: Asad Bhopali
Farishta	Kedar Kapoor	Dev Kumar, Nivedita, Mehmood Jr., Gajanan Jagirdar, Master Shahid, Sudhir, Tun Tun	Drama	Music: Dattaram Wadkar; Lyrics: Asad Bhopali
Gauri	A. Bhim Singh	Sunil Dutt, Nutan, Sanjeev Kumar, Mumtaz, Rajendra Nath, Om Prakash, Laxmi Chhaya, Urmila Bhatt, Leela Mishra, Ashim Kumar	Melodrama	Music: Ravi; Lyrics: Rajendra Krishan
Golden Eyes Secret Agent 077	Kamal Sharma	Sailesh Kumar, Mumtaz, Helen, Ravi Kumar, Shabnam, Asit Sen, B. M. Vyas, Ulhas, Madhumati, Sheikh, Nazir Kashmiri, Abu Bakar	Spy Action Thriller	Music: Baldev Nath; Lyrics: Shewan Rizvi
Har Har Gange	Babubhai Mistry	Abhi Bhattacharya, Bharathi, Sulochana, Tun Tun, Mahesh Desai, B. M. Vyas, Jeevan, Helen, Madhumati, Raj Kumar, Polson, S. N. Tripathi	Religious	Music: S. N. Tripathi; Lyrics: Kavi Pradeep
Haseena Maan Jayegi	Prakash Mehra	Shashi Kapoor, Babita, Ameeta, Amar, Johnny Walker, Sapru, Manmohan, Niranjan Sharma	Romance	Music: Kalyanji Anandji; Lyrics: Qamar Jalalabadi, Akhtar Romani, Prakash Mehra
Haye Mera Dil	Ved Madan	Kishore Kumar, Kumkum, I. S. Johar, Laxmi Chhaya, Madan Puri, Prem Chopra, Majnu, Raj Mehra, Parveen Paul	Comedy	Music: Usha Khanna; Lyrics: Pyare Lal Santoshi, S. H. Bihari, Anand Bakshi
Humsaya	Joy Mukherjee	Joy Mukherjee, Sharmila Tagore, Mala Sinha, Rehman, Gajanan Jagirdar, Sapru, Malika, Polson	Romantic Spy Drama	Music: O P Nayyar; Lyrics: Hasrat Jaipuri, Shewan Rizvi, S. H. Bihari

== I-L ==
Title	Director	Cast	Genre	Music
Izzat	T. Prakash Rao	Dharmendra, Tanuja, Jayalalithaa, Mehmood, Balraj Sahni, Tiwari, Mukri, David, Devika, Lalita Pawar	Social	Music: Laxmikant Pyarelal; Lyrics: Sahir Ludhianvi
Jawab Aayega	Ismat Chugtai, Shahid Lateef		Children	
Jhuk Gaya Aasman	Lekh Tandon	Rajendra Kumar, Saira Banu, Rajendra Nath, Prem Chopra, David, Durga Khote, Gajanan Jagirdar, Kamal Kapoor, Narendranath, Hari Shivdasani, Parveen Choudhary, Ruby Myers, Ram Avatar	Romantic fantasy Drama	Music: Shankar Jaikishan; Lyrics: Hasrat Jaipuri, Shailendra, S. H. Bihari
Juari	Suraj Prakash	Shashi Kapoor, Nanda, Kalpana, Tanuja, Rehman, David, Madan Puri, Naaz, Agha, Achala Sachdev, Kamal Kapoor, Sulochana	Melodrama	Music: Kalyanji Anandji; Lyrics: Anand Bakshi
Jung Aur Aman	Nanabhai Bhatt	Dara Singh, Mumtaz, Randhawa, Krishna Kumari, Jayant, Murad, Nadira, Laxmi Chhaya, Rajan Haksar, Mohan Choti	Action	Music: G. S. Kohli; Lyrics: Prem Dhawan, Hasrat Jaipuri, Anjaan
Kahin Aur Chal	Vijay Anand	Dev Anand, Asha Parekh, Shobha Khote, Madan Puri, Sunder, Jagdish Raj	Romantic Drama	Music: Shankar Jaikishan; Lyrics: Hasrat Jaipuri, Shailendra
Kahin Din Kahin Raat	Darshan	Biswajeet, Sapna, Pran, Helen, Johnny Walker, Veena, Malika, Murad, Bipin Gupta, Mohan Choti, Nadira, Habib, Ram Avatar	Action Thriller	Music: O P Nayyar; Lyrics: S. H. Bihari, Aziz Kashmiri
Kanyadaan	Mohan Sehgal	Shashi Kapoor, Asha Parekh, Dileep Raj, Sayeeda Khan, Om Prakash, Achala Sachdev, Tun Tun, Sabita Chatterjee, Sarita Khatau, Gopal Sehgal, Laxmi Chayya, Nazir Kashmiri, Rashid Khan	Social Romantic melodrama	Music: Shankar Jaikishan; Lyrics: Gopaldas Neeraj, Hasrat Jaipuri
Khiladi	Homi Wadia	Fearless Nadia, Dilip Raj, Sabita, Uma, Suzie, W. M. Khan, Vishwas Kunte, Habib	Action	Basant Pictures. Music: Lala Sattar; Lyrics: Faruk Kaiser
Kismat	Manmohan Desai	Biswajeet, Babita, Helen, Murad, Ulhas, Kamal Mehra, Hiralal, Hari Shivdasani, Jagdish Raj, Tun Tun, Polson, M. B. Shetty	Romance Suspense Thriller	Music: O. P. Nayyar; Lyrics: Noor Dewasi
Lady Killer	B. J. Patel	Aroon Sarnaik, Shabnam, David, Helen, Satyen Kappu, Nilofar, Rani, Arvind Rathod	Action Thriller	Music: Ajit Merchant; Lyrics: Indeevar
Lahoo Pukarega	S. N. Tripathi	Sujit Kumar, Shabnam, Tabassum, Madhumaliti, Salim Khan, Sunder, Rani, Habib, Noorjehan, Kundan	Action	Music: S. N. Tripathi; Lyrics: Saba Fazli, Jaffer Ali
London Express	B. J. Patel	Joni Bond, Rajan Kapoor, Arvind Rathod, Habib, Shri Bhagwan	Action Costume	Music: Robin Bannerjee; Lyrics: Bakshi M Khanna
Lutera Aur Jadugar	D. Raman	Azad, Nishi, Tabassum, Jagdeep, Mohan Choti, Rajan Haksar, Heera Sawant, Noorjehan	Action Fantasy	Music: Suresh Kumar; Lyrics: Yogesh, Naseem Zaidi

== M-R ==
Title	Director	Cast	Genre	Music
Mahatma: Life of Gandhi, 1869–1948	Vithalbhai Jhaveri		Documentary	
Man Ka Meet	A. Subba Rao	Som Dutt, Leena Chandavarkar, Vinod Khanna, Om Prakash, Achala Sachdev, Rajendra Nath, Ramesh Deo, Shammi, Nana Palsikar, Ashim Kumar, Manorama	Romance Action	Ajanta Pictures, produced by Sunil Dutt. Music: Ravi; Lyrics: Rajendra Krishan
Mata Mahakali	Dhirubhai Desai	Shahu Modak, Jayshree Gadkar, Nalini Chonkar, Ashish Kumar, B. M. Vyas, Niranjan Sharma, Mahesh Bhatt, Polson	Mythology	Music: Avinash Vyas; Lyrics: Bharat Vyas
Mere Hamdam Mere Dost	Amar Kumar	Dharmendra, Sharmila Tagore, Mumtaz, Rehman, Santosh Kumar, Nigar Sultana, Om Prakash, Achala Sachdev, Snehlata, Khairati, Nazir Kashmiri	Romantic drama	Music: Laxmikant Pyarelal; Lyrics: Majrooh Sultanpuri
Mere Huzoor	Vinod Kumar	Raaj Kumar, Jeetendra, Mala Sinha, Laxmi Chhaya, Zeb Rehman, Johnny Walker, K. N. Singh, David, Manorama, Surekha, Indira Billi	Romantic Drama	Music: Shankar–Jaikishan; Lyrics: Hasrat Jaipuri
Nadir Shah	S. N. Tripathi	Feroz Khan, Naaz, Sheikh Mukhtar, Murad, Minu Mumtaz, P. Kailash, Hiralal, Sadiq	Historical Action Drama	Music: S. N. Tripathi; Lyrics: Majrooh Sultanpuri
Neel Kamal	Ram Maheshwari	Waheeda Rehman, Manoj Kumar, Raaj Kumar, Lalita Pawar, Mehmood, Shashikala, Balraj Sahni	Drama, Romance, Thriller, Musical	Music: Ravi; Lyrics: Sahir Ludhianvi
Padosan	Jyoti Swaroop	Sunil Dutt, Mehmood, Saira Banu, Kishore Kumar, Om Prakash, Dulari, Raj Kishore, Sunder, Agha, Jankidas	Comedy/Musical	Music: R. D. Burman; Lyrics: Rajendra Krishan
Parivar	Kewal P. Kashyap	Jeetendra, Nanda, Rajendra Nath, Om Prakash, Sulochana, Tun Tun, Jankidas, Krishan Dhawan	Family Drama	Music: Kalyanji Anandji; Lyrics: Gulshan Bawra
Payal Ki Jhankar	M. V. Raman	Kishore Kumar, Rajasree, Jyotilaxmi, Rehman, Dhumal, P. Kailash	Romantic melodrama	Music: C. Ramchandra; Lyrics: Rajendra Krishan
Pinjra	V. Shantaram	Shriram Lagoo, Sandhya, Nilu Phule, Vatsala Deshmukh, Bhalchandra Kulkarni	Romantic Social Melodrama	Music: Ram Kadam; Lyrics: Jagdish Khebudkar
Professor and Jadugar	Sultan	Indrajit, Indira, Khurshid (jr), Indira Bansal, Bob, Poonam Kapoor, Dalpat, Prem Sagar	Action Fantasy	Music: Sardar Singh; Lyrics: Anjaan, K. Malik
Raaste Aur Manzil	C. Vishwanath	P. Jairaj, Azra, Sushma, Pratima Devi, Sachin	Social	Music: Ram Kadam; Lyrics: Ibrahim Faiz
Raja Aur Runk	K. P. Atma	Sanjeev Kumar, Kumkum, Nazima, Mohan Choti, Ajit, Mukri, Nirupa Roy, Mahesh Kumar, Kamal Kapoor, Aruna Irani, Bipin Gupta, Badri Prasad	Costume Drama	Music: Laxmikant Pyarelal; Lyrics: Anand Bakshi
Roop Rupaiya	P. L. Santoshi	Jagdeep, Anita, Jayamala, Roma, Mirza Musharraf, Ulhas, Vivek	Social	Music: Usha Khanna; Lyrics: Pyarelal Santoshi

== S-Z ==
Title	Director	Cast	Genre	Music
Saathi	C. V. Sridhar	Vyjayanthimala, Rajendra Kumar, Simi, Pahari Sanyal, David, Sanjeev Kumar, Veena, Sapru, Shabnam, Ram Mohan	Romantic drama	Music: Naushad; Lyrics: Majrooh Sultanpuri, Shakeel Badayuni (Yeh Kaun Aaya)
Sadhu Aur Shaitaan	A. Bhimsingh	Om Prakash, Mehmood, Pran, Bharathi, Kishore Kumar, Anwar, Mukri, Jankidas, Tun Tun	Comedy	Music: Laxmikant Pyarelal; Lyrics: Rajendra Krishan
Sankat Mein Swasthya Aur Safai aka Health and Cleanliness in Crisis	Shantaram Athavale		Social	
Sapno Ka Saudagar	Mahesh Kaul	Raj Kapoor, Hema Malini, Tanuja, Jayant, Achala Sachdev, David, Durga Khote, Nadira, Roopesh Kumar, Satyen Kappu	Drama	Music: Shankar Jaikishan; Lyrics: Hasrat Jaipuri, Shailendra, S. H. Bihari
Saraswatichandra	Govind Saraiya	Nutan, Ashish Kumar, Mahesh Desai, Vijaya Chaudhary, Sulochana, Surendra, Ramesh Deo, Seema Deo, B. M. Vyas, Nayampally	Social Drama	Music: Kalyanji Anandji; Lyrics: Indeevar
Shikar	Atma Ram	Dharmendra, Asha Parekh, Sanjeev Kumar, Rehman, Ramesh Deo, Johnny Walker, Helen, Manmohan, Bela Bose	Action Mystery Thriller	Music: Shankar Jaikishan; Lyrics: Hasrat Jaipuri
Shrimanji	Ram Dayal	Kishore Kumar, Shahida, I. S. Johar, Murad, Veena, Meena Rai, Ram Avtar, Hiralal	Comedy	Music: O P Nayyar; Lyrics: Aziz Kashmiri, S. H. Bihari
Spy in Rome	B. K. Adarsh	Dev Kumar, Jayamala, K. N. Singh, Rajendra Nath, Lata Sinha, Madhumati	Action Spy Thriller	Music: Laxmikant Pyarelal; Lyrics: Anand Bakshi
Suhaag Raat	R. Bhattacharya	Jeetendra, Rajashree, Shabnam, Mehmood, Sulochana, Dhumal, Mehmood Jr., Laxmi Chhaya, Bipin Gupta, Parshuram	Melodrama	Music: Kalyanji Anandji; Lyrics: Indeevar, Qamar Jalalabadi, Akhtar Romani
Sunghursh	Harnam Singh Rawail	Dilip Kumar, Vyjayanthimala, Balraj Sahni, Sanjeev Kumar, Iftekhar, Jayant, Durga Khote, Ulhas, Sapru, Deven Verma, Sulochana	Drama	Music: Naushad; Lyrics: Shakeel Badayuni
Tarzan In Fairyland	Sushil Gupta	Azad, Indira, Shyam Kumar, Amar Ram Kumar, Ram Mohan, Kumud Tripathi, Nazir Kashmiri	Action Fantasy	Music: Jimmy Premnath; Lyrics: Shewan Rizvi
Tatar Ki Hasina	Aslam Ilahabadi	Raj Gulshan, Nalini Chonkar, Sherry, Murad, Jeevankala, Heera Sawant, Kumud Tripathi	Fantasy	Music: S. Kishan; Lyrics: Aslam Ilahabadi
Teen Bahuraniyan	S. S. Balan, S. S. Vasan	Prithviraj Kapoor, Shashikala, Agha, Ramesh Deo, Lalita Pawar, Dhumal, Kanhaiyalal, Jagdeep	Family Comedy	Music: Kalyanji Anandji; Lyrics: Anand Bakshi
Teri Talash Mein	Kewal Mishra	Sailesh Kumar, Kumkum, Madan Puri, Indira Billi, Mohan Choti, Amarnath, W. M. Khan, Ram Mohan	Murder, Mystery Action	Music: Sapan-Jagmohan; Lyrics: Naqsh Lyallpuri
Vaasna	T. Prakash Rao	Raaj Kumar, Padmini, Biswajeet, Tiwari, Kumud Chhugani, Mukri, Sayeeda Khan, Rajendra Nath	Social Family Drama	Music: Chitragupta; Lyrics: Sahir Ludhianvi
Watan Se Door	Kamran	Dara Singh, Nishi, Randhawa, Bela Bose, Daisy Irani, Amarnath, Tiwari, Amar, Tun Tun, Habib	Action War	Music: Lala Sattar; Lyrics: Faruq Kaiser
