= S. H. Bihari =

Indian lyricist (1920–1987)

Shamsul Huda Bihari
- S. H. Bihari
- Born: 12 July 1920; Arrah, Bengal Presidency, British India (present day Bihar, India)
- Died: 25 February 1987 (aged 66)
- Occupation: Lyricist
- Years active: 1954–1986
- Spouse: Safiya (2nd wife) (m. 1953)
- Website: shbihari.com

Shamsul Huda Bihari (S. H. Bihari) (12 July 1920 – 25 February 1987) was an Indian lyricist, songwriter and poet whose work was widely recorded and used in Bollywood movies during the latter half of the 20th century.

Bihari was born in Arrah, Bihar, India. He lived at Madhupur, Deoghar dist. in Jharkhand. His ancestral villa still exists in Madhupur. He died in 1987.

== Career ==
S.H.Bihari is best known for writing lyrics for films in Hindi and Urdu and was also fluent in Bengali. In 1985, along with the lyrics for the songs, Bihari also wrote the script for the film Pyaar Jhukta Nahin.

In a radio programme on the Vividh Bharati channel of All India Radio, composer O.P.Nayyar said from his perspective, he regarded S.H.Bihari as "Shayar-e-azam" i.e. King or Emperor among poets. S.H.Bihari wrote songs in many movies for which O.P.Nayyar composed music. In 2006, poet, lyricist and screenwriter Javed Akhtar cited Bihari as a role-model, describing him as a "mindblowing ... poet whom no one remembers today".

== Filmography ==
Year	Film	Songs written	Music Director(s)	Notes
1949	Ladli	2	Anil Krishna Biswas	Debut film
1949	Aeeye	1	Nashad	
1949	Duniya	At least 2	Ramchandra Narhar Chitalkar	
1950	Bhai Bahen	1	Shyam Sundar Gaba	
1950	Dilruba	2	Gyan Dutt	
1950	Nirdosh	2	Shyam Sundar Gaba	
1951	Bedardi	At least 2	Roshan Lal Nagrath	
1952	Khubsurat	1	Madan Mohan Kohli	
1952	Nishan Danka	2	Basant Prakash	
1953	Rangeela	9	Jamal Sen	
1954	Dakoo Ki Larki	4	Hemant Kumar	
1954	Gawaiya	8	Ram Ganguly	
1954	Kasba	2 (All)	Ram Ganguly	Audio records were issued for this film but it was nor released.
1954	Mangu	2	Mohammed Shafi Niyazi	
1954	Sangam	3	Ram Ganguly	
1954	Shart	8	Hemant Kumar	
1955	Bahu	9 (All)	Hemant Kumar	
1955	Bandish	2	Hemant Kumar	
1955	Bhagwat Mahima	2	Hemant Kumar	
1955	Bindiya	3	Snehal Bhatkar	
1955	Madhur Milan	3	Bulo C. Rani	
1956	Arab Ka Saudagar	6	Hemant Kumar	
1956	Baghi Sardar	1	Baldev Nath Bali	
1956	Hamara Watan	6	Hemant Kumar	
1956	Inspector	9	Hemant Kumar	Also story writer
1957	Ek Jhalak	8 (All)	Hemant Kumar	
1957	Hill Station	7 (All)	Hemant Kumar	
1957	Kitna Badal Gaya Insan	11 (All)	Hemant Kumar	
1957	Yahoodi Ki Ladki	8 (All)	Hemant Kumar	
1958	Dilli Ka Thug	2	Ravi Shankar Sharma	
1958	Do Mastane	2	Hemant Kumar	
1958	Dulhan	6	Ravi Shankar Sharma	
1958	Ghar Sansar	3	Ravi Shankar Sharma	
1958	Mehndi	4	Ravi Shankar Sharma	
1960	Basant	1	Omkar Prasad Nayyar	
1960	Mitti Mein Sona	1	Omkar Prasad Nayyar	
1961	Modern Girl	1	Ravi Shankar Sharma	
1961	Saaya	1	Ram Ganguly	
1961	Salaam Mem Saheb	3	Ravi Shankar Sharma	
1962	Apna Banake Dekho	4	Ravi Shankar Sharma	
1962	Ek Musafir Ek Hasina	3	Omkar Prasad Nayyar	
1962	Girls Hostel	1	Ravi Shankar Sharma	
1962	Hong Kong	1	Omkar Prasad Nayyar	
1962	Issi Ka Naam Duniya Hai	8 (All)	Ravi Shankar Sharma	Also story writer; produced by his brother Huda Bihari.
1962	Tower House	1	Ravi Shankar Sharma	
1964	Kashmir Ki Kali	9 (All)	Omkar Prasad Nayyar	Bihari's song "Balma Khuli Hawa Mein" sung by Asha Bhosle with music by O. P. Nayyar was removed from the film due to Censor Board Objections.
1964	Raj Nandini	At least 3	Ramchandra Pal	
1965	Sindbad Alibaba And Aladin	7 (All)	Ravi Shankar Sharma	Bihari's song "Banda Parwar Mohabbat Ka Salaam Le Lijiye" sung by Manna Dey, Mohammed Rafi & Asha Bhosle with music by Ravi was issued on music records but was not used in the film. Bihari's song "Kya Jawan Raat Hai Baharon Ki" sung byMohammed Rafi & Asha Bhosle with music by Ravi, had 3 stanzas. While 2 stanzas were used in the film, the third stanza was present only in music records.
1966	Baharen Phir Bhi Aayengi	1	Omkar Prasad Nayyar	
1966	Do Dilon Ki Dastan	1	Omkar Prasad Nayyar	
1966	Khoon Ka Khoon	5 (All)	Usha Khanna	
1966	Love And Murder	3	Omkar Prasad Nayyar	
1966	Mohabbat Zindagi Hai	8 (All)	Omkar Prasad Nayyar	
1966	Sawan Ki Ghata	8 (All)	Omkar Prasad Nayyar	Bihari's song "Hothon Pe Hansi Aankhon Mein Nasha" sung by Mohammed Rafi & Asha Bhosle with music by O. P. Nayyar was issued on music records but was not used in the film.
1966	Yeh Raat Phir Na Aaygi	5	Omkar Prasad Nayyar	
1967	C. I. D. 909	1	Omkar Prasad Nayyar	
1967	Dilruba	2	Usha Khanna	
1967	Nasihat	4	Omkar Prasad Nayyar	
1967	Trip To Moon alias Chand Par Chadhai		Usha Khanna	
1968	Dil Aur Mohabbat	1	Omkar Prasad Nayyar	
1968	Duniya	1	Shankar-Jaikishan	
1968	Haye Mera Dil	3	Usha Khanna	
1968	Humsaya	2	Omkar Prasad Nayyar	
1968	Jhuk Gaya Aasman	1	Shankar-Jaikishan	
1968	Kahin Din Kahin Raat	6	Omkar Prasad Nayyar	
1968	Kismat	4	Omkar Prasad Nayyar	
1968	Sapnon Ka Saudagar	1	Shankar-Jaikishan	
1968	Shrimanji	2	Omkar Prasad Nayyar	For the song "Jhoothe Balma Ka Babuji Pyaar Jhootha" sung by Asha Bhosle & Kamal Barot & music directed by Omkar Prasad Nayyar, Bihari reused this lyrics for a song from the film Jwala (1986), sung by Asha Bhosle & music directed by Jagjit Singh.
1969	Bhai Bahen	3	Shankar-Jaikishan	
1969	Shatranj	2	Shankar-Jaikishan	
1969	The Killers alias Hum Sab Qatil Hain	4	Omkar Prasad Nayyar	
1969	Thief Of Bagdad alias Bagdad Ka Chor	3	Baldev Nath Bali	
1970	Aag Aur Daag	6	Dattaram Baburao Naik	
1970	Bhai-Bhai	1	Shankar-Jaikishan	
1970	Inspector	6 (All)	Dattaram Baburao Naik	
1970	Mangu Dada	2	C. Arjun	
1970	Pagla Kahin Ka	1	Shankar-Jaikishan	
1970	Puraskar alias C. I. D. Agent	5 (All)	Rahul Dev Burman	
1970	Umang	1	Shankar-Jaikishan	
1971	Aisa Bhi Hota Hai	3	Omkar Prasad Nayyar	
1971	Jāne-Anjāne	2	Shankar-Jaikishan	
1971	Kahin Aar Kahin Paar	3	Ganesh Sharma	
1971	Shan-e-Khuda	1	Iqbal Qureshi	
1972	Bees Saal Pehle	8 (All)	Hemant Kumar	
1972	Ek Bar Mooskura Do	3	Omkar Prasad Nayyar	
1972	Rivaaj	1	Shankar-Jaikishan	
1972	Yaar Mera	1	Shankar-Jaikishan	
1973	Nanha Shikari	2	Bappi Lahiri	
1974	Ganga	1	Datta Naik	
1974	Pran Jaye Per Vachan Na Jaye	5	Omkar Prasad Nayyar	
1975	Jaggu	2	Sonik-Omi	
1977	Naami Chor	1	Kalyanji-Anandji	
1978	Khoon Ka Badla Khoon	7	Omkar Prasad Nayyar	
1979	Bin Maa Ke Bachche	6 (All)	Omkar Prasad Nayyar	Also story writer, screenplay writer & dialogue writer
1979	Meri Biwi Ki Shaadi	1	Usha Khanna	
1982	Nek Parveen		Iqbal Qureshi	
1982	Preet Na Jane Reet	5	Iqbal Qureshi	It appears that music records of this film were released under the title Humen Tumse Pyar Hai. However, the film was certified & released with a different title.
1982	Pyar Ke Rahi	2	Aziz Nazan	
1983	Apna Bhi Koi Hota	5 (All)	Chitragupta Srivastava	
1983	Karate	7 (All)	Bappi Lahiri	Also dialogue writer
1985	Lover Boy	3	Bappi Lahiri	
1985	Pyar Jhukta Nahin	6 (All)	Laxmikant-Pyarelal	Also dialogue writer & co-screenplay writer
1985	Teri Meherbaniyan	5 (All)	Laxmikant-Pyarelal	
1986	Asli Naqli	5 (All)	Laxmikant-Pyarelal	
1986	Jwala	3	Jagjit Singh	For the song "Jhoothe Balma Ka Babuji Pyaar Jhootha" sung by Asha Bhosle & music directed by Jagjit Singh, Bihari had used the lyrics of this song's hook lines for a song in the film Shrimanji (1968), which was sung by Asha Bhosle & Kamal Barot with music directed by Omkar Prasad Nayyar.
1986	Love 86	3	Laxmikant-Pyarelal	
1986	Mazloom	6 (All)	Laxmikant-Pyarelal	
1986	Muddat	1	Laxmikant-Pyarelal	
1986	Naseeb Apna Apna	6 (All)	Laxmikant-Pyarelal	
1986	Pyar Kiya Hai Pyar Karenge	6 (All)	Laxmikant-Pyarelal	
1987	Aulad	7 (All)	Laxmikant-Pyarelal	
1987	Insaaf Kaun Karega ?	1	Laxmikant-Pyarelal	
1987	Jawab Hum Denge	2	Laxmikant-Pyarelal	
1987	Mard Ki Zabaan	3	Laxmikant-Pyarelal	
1988	Janam Janam	5	Laxmikant-Pyarelal	Posthomous release
1988	Kab Tak Chup Rahungi ?	1	Bappi Lahiri	Posthomous release
1988	Shoorveer	6 (All)	Laxmikant-Pyarelal	Posthomous release
1989	Do Qaidi	2	Laxmikant-Pyarelal	Posthomous release
1989	Kasam Suhaag Ki	2	Laxmikant-Pyarelal	Posthomous release
1997	Diwana Tere Dilka	3	Laxmikant-Pyarelal	Posthomous release; the film was launched with the title Mohabbat Ki Aag. It's audio records were also released in 1987 with this title. However, the film itself got delayed & was released in 1997 as Diwana Tere Dilka.
