= Nanha Shikari =

- Directed by: R L Desai
- Written by: Shomu Mukherjee
- Produced by: Shomu Mukherjee
- Starring: Deb Mukherjee; Tanuja
- Music by: Bappi Lahiri
- Release date: 16 April 1973
- Country: India
- Language: Hindi

Nanha Shikari is a 1973 Hindi family musical drama film starring Deb Mukherjee and Tanuja in pivotal roles. It is directed by Tanuja's husband Shomu Mukherjee. The film was debut for music director Bappi Lahiri

== Cast ==
- Tanuja
- Laxmi Chhaya
- Deb Mukherjee
- Iftekhar

== Music ==
The music of the film was composed by Bappi Lahiri and lyrics were by Yogesh, S. H. Bihari and Gorukh Kanpuri. The songs were sung by Kishore Kumar, Asha Bhosle, Mukesh and Sushma Shrestha.

| Song | Singer |
|---|---|
| "Nanha Shikari" | Kishore Kumar |
| "Tu Meri Manzil, Main To Raahi Hoon Sanam" | Kishore Kumar, Asha Bhosle |
| "Mushkil Jeena Hai Yahan" | Asha Bhosle |
| "Tu Hi Mera Chanda, Tu Hi Tara" | Mukesh, Sushma Shrestha |
