= Gyan Mukherjee =

Indian film director and screenwriter

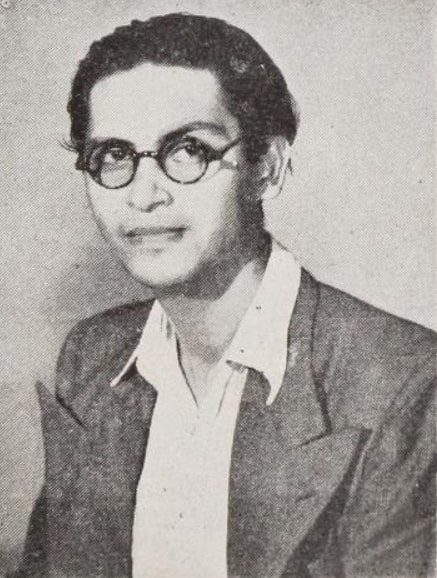
- Mukherjee in November 1945
- Born: 30 September 1909; Benares, United Provinces, British India
- Died: 13 November 1956 (aged 47); Calcutta, West Bengal, India
- Occupations: film director and screenwriter
- Years active: 1930s–1956

Gyan Mukherjee (30 September 1909 – 13 November 1956) was an Indian film director and screenwriter, who worked in Hindi cinema, best known for the hits Jhoola (1941) and Kismet (1943).

== Early life ==
Mukherjee was born on 30 September 1909 in Benares, United Provinces, British India (now Uttar Pradesh, India).

== Career ==
=== Early career ===
Mukherjee started his career with New Theatres in Calcutta (now Kolkata), and subsequently joined Bombay Talkies as a supervising technician. He soon became a trendsetter of "formula film" starting with first directorial venture Geeta (1940) based on the theme, "Crime-doesn't-pay", "Boy meets girl" was used in Jhoola (1941).

=== 1943—1956 ===
In 1943, he reused the formula of Geeta to direct the biggest hit of his career, Kismet (1943), which also add another formula of "lost-and-found", which remained popular for several decades in Hindi films. The film had Ashok Kumar, the leading star of the era, playing an anti-hero and also appearing in a double role. The film had a strong-anti British sentiment and also featured the noted patriotic song, "Door hato O Duniya walon, Hindustan Hamara Hai" (Leave People of World, India is Ours) by Kavi Pradeep, and went on to run at Roxy Cinema in Calcutta for 3 years and 8 months. Subhash K. Jha has called Kismet as one of the most influential films of all times" in Indian cinema.

After death of Himanshu Rai, founder of Bombay Talkies Studio in 1940, a group led by producer Sashadhar Mukherjee along with production controller Rai Bahadur Chunilal, actor Ashok Kumar and Mukherjee, broke away to establish the Filmistan studio in March 1943 at the premises of old Sharada Movietone studios in Goregaon, Mumbai. He retouched the concept of anti-hero in Sangram (1950), today his works are seen as early depictions of the underworld and the anti-hero in Indian cinema.

While working at Bombay Talkies, auteur Guru Dutt trained under him, though he also assisted Amiya Chakravarty, Dutt emulated Mukherjee's formula-based film style in his early films and eventually dedicated his classic, Pyaasa (1957) to Mukherjee, Another noted director, who assisted him at Bombay Talkies, was Shakti Samanta, who later made Aradhana (1969) and Amar Prem (1972).

== Death ==
Mujherjee died on 13 November 1956 in Calcutta (now Kolkata), at the age of 47. Guru Dutt's Kaagaz Ke Phool (1959) is considered to be a homage to Mukherjee.

== Filmography ==
Year	Film	Work		Notes
Year	Film	Direction	Screenplay	Notes
1940	Bandhan		Yes	
1941	Jhoola	Yes	Yes	
1941	Naya Sansar		Yes	
1943	Kismet	Yes		
1944	Chal Chal Re Naujawan	Yes		
1950	Sangram	Yes	Yes	
1953	Samsheer	Yes		
1955	Sardar	Yes		
1956	Satranj	Yes		
1959	Madhu	Yes	Yes	Posthumous release; direction completed by Shanu Banerjee after his death, who had been previously his assistant director before becoming an independent director himself.

== Bibliography ==
- Gulzar; Govind Nihalani; Saibal Chatterjee (2003). Encyclopaedia of Hindi Cinema. Popular Prakashan. ISBN 978-81-7991-066-5.
- Nasreen Munni Kabir (2005). Guru Dutt: a life in cinema. Oxford University Press. ISBN 978-0-19-567233-6.
