= Aisa Bhi Hota Hai =

- Produced by: Kamran Khan
- Starring: Deb Mukherjee; Nandita Bose; Tun Tun; Jalal Agha
- Music by: O.P.Nayyar
- Release date: 1971
- Country: India
- Language: Hindi

Aisa Bhi Hota Hai is a 1971 Indian Hindi-language film starring Deb Mukherjee, Nandita Bose, Tun Tun and Jalal Agha. The music was created by O.P.Nayyar and lyrics written by S.H. Behari.

== Soundtrack ==
#	Song title	Singer(s)
1	"O Meri Gori Gori Jaan Main Hoon Tera Ek Deewaana"	Kishore Kumar
2	"Chaand Raaton Ko Nikale Na Nikale"	Asha Bhosle
3	"Jaako Raakhe Saaiyaan (Jis Ka Rakhwala Bhagwan)"	Mohammed Rafi
4	"Raam Jaane Kiski Laagi Hai Mujhko Nazariya"	Asha Bhosle
