= Sashadhar Mukherjee =

Indian film producer

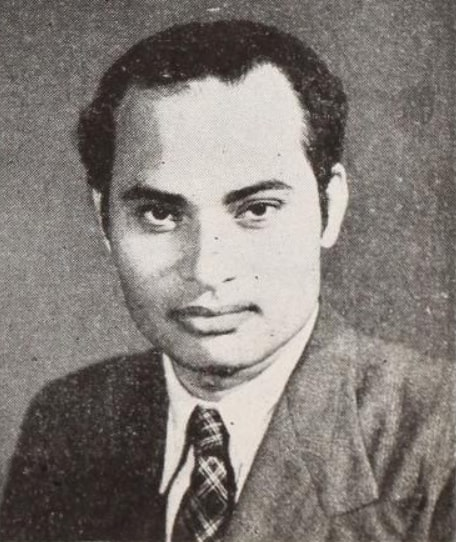
- Mukherjee in November 1945
- Born: 29 September 1909; Jhansi, British India
- Died: 3 November 1990 (aged 81); Bombay, Maharashtra, India
- Occupation: Filmmaker
- Spouse: Sati Devi
- Children: 6 (inc. Joy, Deb and Shomu)
- Family: Mukherjee family; Ganguly family

Sashadhar Mukherjee (29 September 1909 – 3 November 1990) was an Indian filmmaker in Hindi cinema. He started his career with Bombay Talkies in the 1930s, and later established Filmistan Studio with Rai Bahadur Chunilal (father of music director Madan Mohan), Ashok Kumar and Gyan Mukherjee in 1943. In the 1950s, he went on to start his independent studio, Filmalaya. He is noted for films like Dil Deke Dekho (1959), Love in Simla (1960), Ek Musafir Ek Hasina (1962) and Leader (1964). He is part of the distinguished Mukherjee clan of Bollywood.

He won the Filmfare Award for Best Film in 1956 for Jagriti. In 1967, he was awarded the Padma Shri, India's fourth highest civilian honour by the Government of India.

== Family ==
Mukherjee was born on 29 September 1909 in Jhansi into an educated, middle-class Bengali Hindu family, the second of four brothers. His father, Haripada Mukherjee, who belonged to minor gentry, had received an English education and was in government service. The family, at that time, had nothing to do with the entertainment business or any other trade; however, not only Sashadhar but also two of his three brothers were to make a name for themselves in the film industry. Mukherjee's younger brothers were film director Subodh Mukherjee and film producer Prabodh Mukherjee. His elder brother was Ravindramohan Mukherjee, who had little contact with the film industry, but whose granddaughter is the actress Rani Mukerji.

Mukherjee was married when he was a teenager to Sati Devi Mukherjee, a teenager of his own Bengali Hindu community and similar family background, in a match arranged by their parents. Sati Devi's father was employed in government service, and her family also lived in a Hindi-speaking area; consequently, both families spoke Hindi with native-level fluency. This proved important because due to Mukherjee's influence, all three of Sati Devi's brothers were to become actors and big names in the Hindi film industry. Her brothers were Ashok Kumar, Anoop Kumar and Kishore Kumar, the latter being an actor, but more famously a playback singer. Sashadhar Mukherjee was instrumental in helping his own brothers and his wife's brothers to establish themselves in the film industry.

Sashadhar and Sati Devi had six children, five sons and one daughter, namely Rono Mukherjee, Joy Mukherjee, Deb Mukherjee, Shomu Mukherjee, Shibani Mukherjee and Shubir Mukherjee. All of their sons were active in the film industry, including the superstar Joy, and some of their grandchildren are likewise involved in the industry. Deb's son is film director Ayan Mukherjee, who directed Yeh Jawani Hai Deewani (2013). Shomu married the actress Tanuja (daughter of Shobhana Samarth and sister of Nutan) and became the father of two daughters, Kajol and Tanisha, both of whom also became actresses, Kajol becoming one of the most popular actresses in Hindi cinema.

== Career ==
He was a producer for Bombay Talkies, and after the death of Himanshu Rai in 1940, was involved in a tussle for control of Bombay Talkies with Devika Rani, actress and widow of Himanshu.

In 1943, Sashadhar Mukherjee formed a partnership with Rai Bahadur Chunilal, Ashok Kumar and Gyan Mukherjee, and they started the studio Filmistan in Goregaon. The first film they planned at Filmistan was Chal Chal Re Naujawan with Naseem Bano and Ashok Kumar who had by then become a star. Sadat Hassan Manto, Ismat Chughtai, Pt. Pradeep and so many other intelligent, talented, and creative people were associated with Filmistan. Filmistan gave breaks and made stars out of Shammi Kapoor, Dev Anand and many more. Mukherjee made unforgettable and classic films there like Anarkali, Nagin, Tumsa Nahin Dekha, Munim ji, and Paying Guest. He groomed Nasir Hussain as a Director.

In the 1950s, Sashadhar formed his own production house called Filmalaya Studios in Andheri, near Amboli. He also ran an acting school and was instrumental in giving actresses like Asha Parekh and Sadhana a break in films. Sanjeev Kumar was also a product of Filmalaya Acting school. Nasir Hussain was a director involved with his productions as were R. K. Nayyar and Gyan Mukherjee; music director O. P. Nayyar was also associated with his solo productions. He launched his son Joy with the film Love in Simla (1960); he also produced films like Ek Musafir Ek Hasina to further his son's career. When Dilip Kumar wanted to make a film on corrupt politicians he came to Mukherjee and made Leader. Sambandh was his last production, though it was produced by his cousin Ram Mukherjee.

== Awards and honors ==
- Padma Shri, India's fourth highest civilian honor (1967)

== Filmography ==
Year	Title	Director	Notes
1939	Kangan		
1940	Bandhan	N.R. Acharya	Banner: Bombay Talkies
1941	Jhoola	Gyan Mukherjee	
1954	Jagriti	Satyen Bose	Filmfare Award for Best Film in 1956
1955	Munimji	Subodh Mukherjee	Filmistan
1957	Tumsa Nahin Dekha	Nasir Hussain	Filmistan
1957	Paying Guest	Subodh Mukherjee	Filmistan
1959	Dil Deke Dekho	Nasir Hussain	Filmalaya
1960	Love in Simla	R. K. Nayyar	Filmalaya
1962	Ek Musafir Ek Hasina	Raj Khosla	
1964	Leader	Ram Mukherjee	
1964	Aao Pyar Karen	R. K. Nayyar	
1965	Tu Hi Meri Zindagi	Rono Mukherjee	

== Dedication in Memory ==
As founder of Filmalaya Studio, the 1990 film Pathar Ke Insan, was dedicated to the memory of Sashadhar Mukherjee.

== Bibliography ==
- Gulzar; Govind Nihalani; Saibal Chatterjee (2003). Encyclopaedia of Hindi Cinema. Popular Prakashan. ISBN 978-81-7991-066-5.
