= Aag Aur Daag =

1970 Indian Hindi film

- Theatrical Release Poster
- Directed by: A. Salaam
- Written by: Charandas Shokh
- Produced by: Swaran Singh
- Starring: Joy Mukherjee and Poonam Sinha
- Cinematography: Haren Bhatt
- Edited by: R.V.Shrikhande
- Music by: Datta Naik; S. H. Bihari
- Release date: 21 January 1971
- Country: India
- Language: Hindi

Aag Dur Daag is a 1970 Hindi-language action drama film directed by A. Salaam. The film stars Joy Mukherjee and Madan Puri. The film's music is by Datta Naik.

== Plot ==
Bombay-based Young Raja witnesses his parents commit suicide after being cheated and defeated in a game of cards by an unknown male. He grows up under the mentor-ship of Madanlal, who witnessed the cheating incident, with only one motive – to avenge his parents' death, and becomes an expert at cards. En route to Mahabuleshwar, He meets with wealthy Renu, both fall in love, and gets married. Her widowed father gives him full control of his business as well as much money. Raja opens up a gambling den and hopes to attract the unknown gambler. It is this move that will result in bitterness and turn his life upside down.

== Cast ==
- Joy Mukherjee as Raja
- Poonam Sinha as Renu
- I. S. Johar as Murli (Taxi Driver)
- Madan Puri as Madanlal 'Baba'
- Jayant as Shyam
- Helen as Dancer

== Soundtrack ==
Song	Singer
"Yeh Pyar Ka Jhagda Hai"	Mohammed Rafi
"Tere Is Pyar Ka Shukriya"	Mohammed Rafi
"Iski Ho Gayi, Uski Ho Gayi"	Mohammed Rafi
"Humse Badhkar Kaun Hoga Aapka Deewana"	Mohammed Rafi, Asha Bhosle
"Choli Bheegi, Lat Bheegi"	Asha Bhosle
"Kam Nahin Sharab Se"	Asha Bhosle
