= Humsaya =

- Directed by: Joy Mukherjee
- Written by: P. D. Shenoy
- Produced by: Joy Mukherjee
- Starring: Joy Mukherjee; Mala Sinha; Sharmila Tagore
- Cinematography: Fali Mistry; Jal Mistry
- Edited by: D. N. Pai
- Music by: O. P. Nayyar
- Production company: Joy Mukherjee Productions
- Release date: 20 December 1968
- Running time: 162 min
- Country: India
- Language: Hindi

Humsaya (Neighbour) is a 1968 Hindi romantic spy thriller film produced and directed by Joy Mukherjee. The film was made under the newly established Joy Mukherjee Productions banner. The music direction was by O. P. Nayyar with lyrics by Shevan Rizvi, S. H. Bihari and Hasrat Jaipuri. It stars Joy Mukherjee, Mala Sinha, Sharmila Tagore in lead roles, with Rehman, Madan Puri, Sapru, Gajanan Jagirdar in other important roles.

The story revolves around Joy Mukherjee playing the double role of an Indian Air Force officer and his lookalike Chinese officer, with Mala Sinha and Sharmila Tagore providing the romantic angle.

== Plot ==
Shyam, an officer in the Indian Air Force, is court-martialled for having committed a murder. He denies the charges but is stripped of his rank and de-mobbed. Professor Tao Ki Chen, a Chinese spy, having framed Shyam for the murder, plays up to him and takes him to a shack near the India-China border. There Shyam overhears Chen talking to Lin Tan a Chinese officer, who has had plastic surgery done to look like Shyam. The plan is for Lin to impersonate Shyam and try getting army secrets out. Somehow Shyam manages to kill Lin and pretends to be Lin impersonating Shyam. He goes back to India and is re-instated in the army when he tells them about Chen's nefarious planning. However he's told to continue playing Lin. Lin's wife Sin Tan comes to India with a Chinese Delegation brought by Chen, which leads to misunderstandings due to Shyam's girlfriend Reena being present. Sin Tan thinks that Shyam is her husband Lin, changed to look like Shyam while Reena does not know about the subterfuge. She gets angry and jealous seeing Shyam and Sin Tan together. After several tension-filled protracted incidents Shyam manages to complete the task entrusted to him by his superiors. The film ends with Lin's wife going back to China and Shyam reuniting with Reena.

== Cast ==
- Joy Mukherjee as Shyam / Lin Tan (Double Role)
- Mala Sinha as Sin Tan
- Sharmila Tagore as Reena Sen
- Rehman as Pratap Singh
- Madan Puri as Professor Tao Ki Chen
- Sapru as Mr. Sen
- Malika as Shakuntala
- Gajanan Jagirdar as Intelligence Officer Sharma

== Production ==
Songs were an important factor in Joy Mukherjee's films as an actor being a success at the box office. Having started acting in 1960 with Love in Simla, his career started declining in the late 1960s. Humsaaya was produced as a means of saving his career, but the film did not do well at the box office. According to the Times Of India blog the film "collapsed" at the box office.

== Soundtrack ==
O. P. Nayyar has composed the music. The lyricists were Shewan Rizvi, S. H. Bihari and Hasrat Jaipuri. The playback singers are Asha Bhosle, Mohammed Rafi and Mahendra Kapoor.

=== Song list ===
| Song | Singer |
|---|---|
| "Dil Ki Aawaz Bhi Sun" | Mohammed Rafi |
| "Mujhe Mera Pyar De De, Tujhe Aazma Liya Hai" | Mohammed Rafi, Asha Bhosle |
| "Badi Mushkil Se Kaabu Mein Dil-E-Deewana Aaya Hai" | Mahendra Kapoor, Asha Bhosle |
| "O Kanhaiya Kanhaiya" | Asha Bhosle |
| "Kitna Haseen Hai Yeh Jahan" | Asha Bhosle |
| "Woh Haseen Dard De Do" | Asha Bhosle |
| "Aaja Mere Pyar Ke Sahare" | Asha Bhosle |
