= Ek Bar Mooskura Do =

- Directed by: Ram Mukherjee
- Starring: Joy Mukherjee; Tanuja; Deb Mukherjee
- Music by: O. P. Nayyar
- Release date: 1972
- Country: India
- Language: Hindi

Ek Bar Mooskura Do (English: Smile Once) is a 1972 Hindi language drama film directed by Ram Mukherjee. The film stars Joy Mukherjee, Tanuja and Deb Mukherjee. O. P. Nayyar's hit music was one of the strengths of this film. Particularly, "Tu Auron Ki Kyun Ho Gayi" sung by Kishore Kumar as a solo is considered one of his best, heart-touching, passionate and fastest songs. The other version of this song is sung by Kishore Kumar and Asha Bhosle a duet. Lyrics were written by S. H. Bihari, Indeevar and Shevan Rizvi.

== Cast ==
- Joy Mukherjee as Dr. Ashok
- Tanuja as Mala
- Deb Mukherjee as Dilip / Kumar
- Rajendra Nath
- Bipin Gupta
- Iftekhar
- Sajjan
- Shobhna Samarth
- Arif Shaikh

== Songs ==
All songs are composed by O. P. Nayyar.

Song	Singer	Raga
"Roop Tera Aisa"	Kishore Kumar	
"Savere Ka Suraj"	Kishore Kumar	Kalyan
"Tu Auron Ki Kyun Ho Gayi"	Kishore Kumar	
"Tu Auron Ki Kyun Ho Gayi" (Duet)	Kishore Kumar, Asha Bhosle	
"Ek Baar Muskura Do, Ek Baar Muskura Do"	Kishore Kumar, Asha Bhosle	
"Chehre Se Zara Aanchal Jab Aapne Sarkaya"	Asha Bhosle, Mukesh	
"Yeh Dil Lekar Nazrana, Aa Gaya Tera Deewana"	Asha Bhosle, Mukesh, S. H. Bihari	
"Zamane Ki Aankhon Ne"	Mohammed Rafi	
