= Insaaf Main Karoonga =

Insaaf Main Karoongaa
- Promotional Poster
- Directed by: Shibu Mitra
- Produced by: B. S. Seth
- Starring: Rajesh Khanna; Joy Mukherjee; Tina Munim; Padmini Kolhapure
- Music by: Bappi Lahiri
- Production company: Seth Films International
- Release date: 22 November 1985
- Running time: 190 minutes
- Country: India
- Language: Hindi

Insaaf Main Karoongaa (lit. 'I will deliver justice') is a 1985 Hindi drama film directed by Shibu Mitra, produced by B.S. Seth and presented by S.K. Kapur. This film has Rajesh Khanna in the lead opposite Tina Munim and Padmini Kolhapure. It also features Joy Mukherjee in his final film role. It is a remake of the Malayalam movie Thushaaram and was started after the success of Souten with the same leading starcast of Khanna, Munim and Kolhapure.

== Synopsis ==
The plot revolves with the life of Captain Ravi Khanna, when his young, beautiful and loving wife committed suicide. Seema was an orphan whom Khanna fell in love with her. One night when Ravi goes out of city for one of his assignments, his wife Seema is raped and commits suicide.

After the suicide takes place, he manages to trace the person and becomes vindictive and shoots the culprit point blank and surrenders to military court.

At this juncture the whole scene changes. As the proceedings of the court were about to start, the news of culprit having survived gets broken to him. This makes the Captain more ferocious and gets provoked to become free, so that on an appropriate opportunity he could fulfil his urge to kill him.

Ravi flees from the army force and on the way he meets his friend Khan who gives him shelter. One night Ravi and Khan decide to go to the hospital, where the culprit was convalescing from his wounds, so that they could kill him. But the Captain is not able to shoot him as some of the army officers see him and try him to capture him. Accidentally the culprit's daughter comes in the way. Ravi then takes hold of her so that he can escape from that place comfortably.

The Captain then decides that he will keep Pinky with him and make it look like a kidnapping and will drive the culprit that mad that he will himself surrender to police and accept that he was the person who drove his wife to commit suicide. The rest of the story is how Ravi is able to catch the culprits and how a relation develops between Pinky and Ravi and what all problems Ravi has to face on his way to attain justice for his beloved late wife.

== Cast ==
- Rajesh Khanna as Captain Ravi Khanna
- Tina Munim as Seema Khanna
- Padmini Kolhapure as Pinky Singh
- Shakti Kapoor as Zafar Khan
- Aruna Irani as Razia
- Joy Mukherjee as Shamsher Singh
- Om Shivpuri as Brigadier Karan Singh
- Chandrashekhar as Jagan
- Tej Sapru as Captain Yunus
- Bob Christo as Commander Bob

== Music ==
Song	Singer
"Socha Kahan Tha" (Sad)	Kishore Kumar
"Socha Kahan Tha" (Happy)	Kishore Kumar
"Aap Ki Nazron Se Dil Pe Goli Chalne Lagi"	Kishore Kumar; Asha Bhosle
"Honey Honey, Kuch Maangun To Dena"	Asha Bhosle; Bappi Lahiri
"Ek Baras Mein Ek Baar Hi"	Bappi Lahiri
"Dum Tana Na Dum Tana, Dum Tana Na Bole Rabba, Yaar Tere Ehsaanon Ka Tujhko Kaise Doon Jawab"	Manhar Udhas; Shabbir Kumar; Chandrani Mukherjee
"Mera Naam Hai Salma"	Sharon Prabhakar
