= Kathputli (1971 film) =

1971 film by Brij Sadanah

- Theatrical release poster
- Directed by: Brij
- Written by: Ved Rahi; Verma Malik; Indeevar; Shadaab (lyrics)
- Produced by: Brij
- Starring: Jeetendra; Mumtaz
- Cinematography: Anwar Siraj
- Edited by: Waman Rao
- Music by: Kalyanji Anandji
- Production company: Dynamo International
- Release date: 28 August 1971
- Running time: 149 minutes
- Country: India
- Language: Hindi

Kathputli (transl.Puppet) is a 1971 Hindi-language romance film, produced and directed by Brij under the Dynamo International banner. It stars Jeetendra and Mumtaz. Kalyanji Anandji composed the music.

== Cast ==
- Jeetendra as Vishal
- Mumtaz as Nisha
- Helen as Roma
- Agha as Meenas father
- Jalal Agha as Murali
- Manmohan as Nisha's boss
- Bhagwan chawl tenant
- Malika as Meena
- Seema Kapoor as Party Dancer
- Dilip Dutt as Muthuswamy
- Fazloo
- Bhola
- Leela Mishra as Kamla Devi
- Asha Chandra as Rosy
- Praveen Paul as Murali's Mother
- Kundan as Sunderlal awara
- Master Chicco as Munna
- Kumud Tripathi as Pandit Nalasoparakar

== Soundtrack ==
#	Title	Singer(s)
1	"Jo Tum Hasoge To Duniya Hasegi"	Kishore Kumar
2	"Hum To Bikhre Moti Hai"	Mahendra Kapoor
3	"Jeena Kaisa Ho Pyar Bina Jeena Kaisa"	Asha Bhosle
4	"Ek Baat Puchhu"	Mohammed Rafi, Lata Mangeshkar
5	"Ho Jai Jai Jal Raja"	Mahendra Kapoor, Asha Bhosle
6	"Hum To Bikhre Moti Hai" (Sad)	Mahendra Kapoor
7	"Likha Hai Likha Hai Haan"	Kishore Kumar, Asha Bhosle
8	"Tu Ban Jaaye Mehendi Ka Buta"	Lata Mangeshkar, Mahendra Kapoor
