= Dil Deke Dekho =

- Directed by: Nasir Hussain
- Produced by: Sashadhar Mukherjee
- Starring: Shammi Kapoor; Asha Parekh
- Cinematography: Dilip Gupta
- Edited by: S.E Chandiwale
- Music by: Songs: Usha Khanna; Background Score: Master Sonik
- Release date: 2 October 1959
- Country: India
- Language: Hindi

Dil Deke Dekho (transl. Try Giving your Heart) is a 1959 Indian Hindi romantic comedy film. It was Nasir Hussain's second film as a director after Tumsa Nahin Dekha (1957), which became a big hit and gave star Shammi Kapoor a new image as a comedic, dancing hero. Hussain and Kapoor reteamed with this film. also in this, Asha Parekh, a former child actress, made her film debut as a heroine. This is also music composer Usha Khanna's first film.

The film became a hit at the box office. Hussain, Kapoor, and Parekh would re-team again for Teesri Manzil (1966), which also became a big hit. Hussain would also cast Parekh as his leading lady in five other films. Shammi Kapoor had said that he had initially wanted Waheeda Rehman, and this role was also offered to actress Sadhana to play his leading lady in the film, but the producer had already signed Asha Parekh, and he encouraged her during filming. The film was released on Asha's 17th birthday.

== Plot ==
Neeta is an heiress, the only daughter of U.K. based Industrialist Jagatnarayan. She is of marriageable age and is being wooed by Kailash, Chandar and Raja. She prefers Chandar over Kailash and Raja, but subsequently changes her mind and falls in love with Raja. Things take a dramatic turn when Jagatnarayan and Neeta find out that Raja is not who he claims to be. When Raja defends himself and calls himself Roop, his very own mother denies this claim and instead states that Chandar is Roop, her only son. Raja must now make attempts to prove himself as Roop and realizes that this is indeed an uphill task.

== Cast ==
- Shammi Kapoor as Roop / Raja / Pyarelal "Pyare" / Professor Samri / Mirza Chengizi
- Asha Parekh as Neeta
- Sulochana Latkar as Jamna
- Raj Mehra as Jagatnarayan
- Rajendranath as Kailash
- Surendra
- Indira Billi
- Mumtaz Ali
- Malika
- Wasti

== Soundtrack ==
The soundtrack of the movie was composed by Usha Khanna, with the lyrics written by Majrooh Sultanpuri.

Song	Singer
"Dil Deke Dekho"	Mohammed Rafi
"Megha Re Bole"	Mohammed Rafi
"Dilruba, O Meri Neeta"	Mohammed Rafi, Usha Khanna
"Bolo Bolo, Kuch To Bolo"	Mohammed Rafi, Usha Khanna
"Rahi Mil Gaye Rahon Mein"	Mohammed Rafi
"Hum Aur Tum Aur Yeh"	Mohammed Rafi
"Bade Hai Dil Ke Kale, Yahi Neeli Si Aankhonwale"	Mohammed Rafi, Asha Bhosle
"Yaar Chulbula Hai, Haseen Dilruba Hai, Jhuth Bolta Hai"	Mohammed Rafi, Asha Bhosle
"Do Ekam Do, Do Dooni Char, Thoda Thoda De De"	Mohammed Rafi, Asha Bhosle
"Pyar Ki Kasam Hai, Na Dekh Aise Pyar Se"	Mohammed Rafi, Asha Bhosle
