= Moojrim =

- Directed by: Kewal Misra
- Starring: Joy Mukherjee and Kumud Chuggani
- Release date: 1970
- Country: India
- Language: Hindi

Moojrim is a 1970 Bollywood crime film about a gold medalist who becomes implicated in a murder while trying to save a girl from attackers. Directed by Kewal Misra, the film stars Joy Mukherjee and Kumud Chuggani.

== Cast ==
- Joy Mukherjee ... Gopal
- Sapna ... Manju Singh
- Dev Kumar ... Ganga Singh / Gangaram
- Jayant ... Gangaram
- Nishi ... Saloni
- Brahmachari ... Gupta
- Hiralal ... V.P. Iyengar
- Rajan Haksar ... Moosa
- Kundan
- Balwant
- Jayshree T. ... Rekha
- Meenakshi
- Rekha Chauhan
- Roopali
- Birbal ... Gyp

== Soundtrack ==
#	Song	Singer
1	"Dil Ka Mehmaan"	Asha Bhosle
2	"Ae Meri Jane Chaman Dilruba Shola Badan"	Mohammed Rafi
3	"Balle Shava Balle Shava"	Asha Bhosle, Shamshad Begum, Mahendra Kapoor
4	"Mujrim Ye Mujrim Wo Mujrim"	Asha Bhosle
5	"Raat Bhi Sard Hai Aaj Dil Me Dard Hai"	Asha Bhosle
