= Haiwan (film) =

- Directed by: Ram Rano
- Music by: Bappi Lahiri
- Release date: 1977
- Country: India
- Language: Hindi

Haiwan is a 1977 Bollywood musical film thriller directed by Ram Rano.

== Cast ==
- Deb Mukherjee
- Joy Mukherjee
- Prema Narayan
- Nazneen

== Songs ==
1. "Dekho Yeh Naari Hai" – Kishore Kumar
2. "Jaane Na Jaane Na Dil Lena" – Krishna Mukherjee
3. "Jai Jai Ma" – Krishna Mukherjee
4. "Maan Na Maan Mai Teri Mehmaan" – Krishna Mukherjee, Amit Kumar
5. "Mai Haiwan Hoon" – Bappi Lahiri
6. "Monalisa O Meri Jaan" – Krishna Mukherjee, Shailendra Singh
7. "O Deewani Raja Raani Kahani" – Amit Kumar
8. "Pyari Pyari Rut Deewani Mere Sathi" – Krishna Mukherjee, Manhar Udhas
9. "Pagal Pagal Hai Yeh Mausum" – Hemant Kumar, Asha Bhosle
10. "Humdum Jhoom Le Zara Mausam Bhi Hai Pyar Ka" – Mohammed Rafi
