= Nazir Kashmiri =

Indian character actor

Nazir Kashmiri was a prolific character actor in Hindi cinema who appeared in over 100 films. His career extended from 1941 to 2008 spanning 67 years.

He started his career in Lahore. He appeared in several Lahore productions before moving to Bombay with Noor Jehan's production company. He appeared in Noor's Indian films Zeenat (1945) and Jugnu (1947).

Through the 1950s and 1960s he was frequently seen in a wide variety of roles. Kashmiri was particularly a fixture of B. R. Chopra films appearing in most of Chopra's films from Ek Hi Raasta (1956) to Kaala Patthar (1979). Kashmiri was also seen in many Dev Anand, Guru Dutt and I. S. Johar films.

Selected Filmography

- Kabhie Kabhie (1976)

Dharmputra 1961

Ek Hi Raasta 1956

Zameer 1975

Naya Daur 1957

Dastaan 1972

Chaudhvin Ka Chand 1960

Lajwanti 1958

Vakil Babu 1982

Sadhna 1958

Aap Ki Parchhaiyan 1964

Kohinoor 1960

Doli 1969

Aaye Din Bahar Ke 1966

- Darwaza (1978)
- Mere Huzoor (1968)
- Hatyara (1977)

Zeenat 1945

- Ek Musafir Ek Hasina (1962)

Aya Sawan Jhoom Ke 1969

Romeo and Juliet 1947

Chandan Ka Palna 1967

Jwaar Bhata 1973

Bahurani 1963

Mere Hamdam Mere Dost 1968

Baharon Ke Sapne 1967

Dus Lakh 1966

Return of Mr. Superman 1960

Badnam Farishte 1971

Neel Kamal 1968

Half Ticket 1962

- Kaneez (1949)

Char Paise 1955

Ek Saal 1957

Amrapali 1966

Devar 1966

Daku Mangal Singh 1966

Ek Phool Do Mali 1969

Faulad 1963

Nadaan 1971

Raj Hath 1956

Dil Bhi Tera Hum Bhi Tere 1960

Pyaar Ka Saagar 1961

Kab? Kyoon? Aur Kahan? 1970

Dilruba 1950

Kanyadaan 1968

Karigar 1958

Baghdad Ka Jadoo

Vallah Kya Baat Hai

Ladka Ladki 1966

Char Dervesh 1964

Cobra Girl

- Aadmi Sadak Ka (1977)
- Immaan Dharam (1977)
