= Phoolan Devi (film) =

- Directed by: Ashok Roy
- Produced by: Rajeev Kaul
- Starring: Rita Bhaduri; Suresh Oberoi; Joy Mukherjee; Goga Kapoor; Prema Narayan
- Music by: Ravindra Jain
- Release date: 1985
- Country: India
- Language: Bengali

Phoolan Devi is a 1985 Bengali action movie directed by Ashok Roy and produced by Rajeev Kaul. This movie was loosely based on the life of Indian bandit turned politician Phoolan Devi. The film was released in Hindi under the name Kahani Phoolvati Ki. Popular hero of the Bollywood movies, Joy Mukherjee played the role of main antagonist.

== Plot ==
Young Phoolan is forced to marry Puttilal, an old man, by her parents. Puttilal's other wife tortures Phoolan. One day Phoolan meets with her close friend Meena who has turned into a bandit having suffered atrocities at the hands of the Thakur brothers. Bikram Mallah, a trusted hand of Thakurs protests such inhuman activities of them. Whilst those brothers attack on Phoolan, Bikram stops them and took charge of the Thakur's gang forcefully. Subsequently, he married Phoolan. Thakur brothers took revenge and killed Bikram and raped Phoolan. They tagged her mercilessly and few villagers gang raped her in all day long. Escaping from their hand Phoolan made her own gang and became Dakait (Decoit) leader. Thereafter she killed all the rapists one by one including two Thakur brothers.

== Cast ==
- Rita Bhaduri as Phoolan Devi
- Suresh Oberoi as Bikram Mallah
- Joy Mukherjee as Bada Thakur
- Gautam Mukherjee as Police commissioner
- Prema Narayan as Meena
- Goga Kapoor as Meena's Husband / Police Informer
- Asit Kumar Sen
- Manik Dutt as Decoit
- Tarun Ghosh
