= Malika Askari =

Indian actress

- Born: Mumbai, India
- Occupations: Actress, model
- Years active: 1955–1982
- Spouse: Randhawa
- Children: 2 including; Shaad Randhawa
- Relatives: Mumtaz (sister)
- Family: See Randhawa family

Malika Askari Randhawa is an Indian actress of Bollywood who is known by the mononym Malika. She is the wife of wrestler and actor Randhawa and sister of actress Mumtaz.

== Filmography ==
| Year | Film | Role |
|---|---|---|
| 1955 | Shahi Chor | |
| 1955 | Sakhi Hatim | |
| 1956 | Chandrakanta | |
| 1956 | Awara Shehzadi | |
| 1956 | Kismet | |
| 1956 | Kar Bhala | |
| 1956 | Ghulam | |
| 1958 | Talaq | |
| 1958 | Malik | |
| 1959 | Ek Arman Mera | |
| 1959 | Dil Deke Dekho | (uncredited) |
| 1961 | Pyaar Ka Saagar | Sheela Singh |
| 1961 | Payaase Panchhi | Jyoti |
| 1962 | Shree Ganesh | |
| 1962 | Rakhi | Rani |
| 1962 | Main Shadi Karne Chala | |
| 1962 | Ek Musafir Ek Hasina | Kamini |
| 1962 | Banarasi Thug | Mala |
| 1963 | Mere Mehboob | |
| 1964 | Hercules | |
| 1964 | Door Ki Awaz | Mala Rai |
| 1965 | Bhakta Prahlad | |
| 1965 | Son of Hatimtai | |
| 1965 | Arzoo | Sabhi |
| 1966 | Spy in Goa | |
| 1966 | Do Matwale | |
| 1966 | Suraj | Madhuri |
| 1966 | Rustom Kaun | Chandni |
| 1967 | Palki | |
| 1968 | Humsaya | Shakuntala |
| 1968 | Ek Kali Muskayee | Putli |
| 1968 | Baharon Ki Manzil | Ballet Dancer |
| 1969 | Do Bhai | Jhuniya |
| 1970 | Khilona | Heerabai |
| 1971 | Preetam | Dr. Chhaya Dutt |
| 1971 | Kathputli | Meena |
| 1971 | Ek Nari Ek Brahmachari | |
| 1971 | Sanjog | Mala |
| 1972 | Roop Tera Mastana | Champa |
| 1973 | Ek Nari Do Roop | Sameena |
| 1982 | Bazaar | |

== Personal life ==
She was married to Dara Singh's brother, Randhawa, and has two children, son Shaad Randhawa, who is an actor and a daughter Shehnaz.
