= Duniya (1968 film) =

1968 film by T. Prakash Rao

- Poster
- Directed by: T. Prakash Rao
- Screenplay by: K. A. Narayan; Vrajendra Gaur
- Story by: K. A. Narayan
- Produced by: Amarjeet
- Starring: Dev Anand; Vyjayanthimala; Balraj Sahni; Johnny Walker; Lalita Pawar
- Cinematography: Faredoon A. Irani
- Edited by: Shivaji Awdhut
- Music by: Shankar Jaikishan
- Release date: 28 December 1968
- Running time: 149 minutes
- Country: India
- Language: Hindi
- Box office: ₹180,000,000

Duniya (transl. The World) is a 1968 Indian Hindi-language romantic thriller film written by K. A. Narayan and directed by T. Prakash Rao. The film starred Dev Anand, Vyjayanthimala in the lead with Balraj Sahni, Johnny Walker, Lalita Pawar, Prem Chopra, Sulochana Latkar, Madan Puri, Nana Palsikar, Achala Sachdev, Laxmi Chhaya, Jagdish Raj, Tun Tun, Brahm Bhardwaj and Pakistani actor Suresh as the ensemble cast. The film was produced by Amarjeet. The film's score was composed by Shankar Jaikishan duo with lyrics provided by Hasrat Jaipuri, S. H. Bihari and Gopaldas Neeraj, edited by Shivaji Awdhut and was filmed by Faredoon A. Irani. The story revolves around three friends (Amarnath, Gopal, and his sister, Mala), how they face their problems in life, and how they recover from the problems in the rest of the story.

== Plot ==
The movie revolves around three friends Amarnath, Gopal, and his sister, Mala. As Mala and Gopal's mother is a widow and is unable to care for both the children, she decides to let her Bombay-based cousin, Shobha R. Sharma, adopt Mala. Gopal is always in trouble with the villagers for petty theft, and when he learns that Mala has left, he too runs away from home. Years later, all three have grown up. Mala's mother is deceased, while she continues to live with her aunt and uncle, Public Prosecutor Ramnath Sharma; Amarnath is now an Advocate working with Senior Advocate Mehta, and is in love with Mala, not knowing that she is his childhood friend; while Gopal has been to prison in Poona, Madras, and the Police in Hyderabad want him for questioning. Soon Amarnath will be defending Gopal, alias Ram Singh, for the murder of one Mohanchand – and it will be an uphill task for Amarnath – for not only do the Police have airtight evidence against Gopal, Mohanchand was to be the future son-in-law of Ramnath – who has sworn to bring Gopal to justice by hook or by crook.

== Cast ==
- Dev Anand as Advocate Amarnath Sharma "Amar"
- Vyjayanthimala as Mala
- Balraj Sahni as Public Prosecutor Ramnath Sharma
- Prem Chopra as Mohanchand "Mohan"
- Madan Puri as Madan
- Johnny Walker as James Bond
- Lalita Pawar as Mrs. Sharma
- Sulochana Latkar as Janki Sharma
- Achala Sachdev as Shobha Sharma
- Laxmi Chhaya as Laxmi
- Nana Palsikar as Girdharilal
- Jagdish Raj as Madan's Associate
- Brahm Bhardwaj as Advocate Mehta
- Suresh as Gopal / Ram Singh
- Tun Tun as Chhabili

== Soundtrack ==
The film's soundtrack was composed by the Shankar Jaikishan duo, while the lyrics were provided by Hasrat Jaipuri, S. H. Bihari and Gopaldas Neeraj.

No.	Song	Singers	Lyrics	Length (m:ss)	Picturisation
1	"Dooriyan Nazdikiyan Ban Gayi"	Kishore Kumar, Asha Bhosle	Hasrat Jaipuri	05:04	Featuring actress Vyjayanthimala and Dev Anand
2	"Falsafa Pyar Ka Tum Kya Jano"	Mohammed Rafi	Hasrat Jaipuri	04:53	Featuring actress Vyjayanthimala and Dev Anand
3	"Jawan Tum Ho Jawan Ham Hai"	Mohammed Rafi	Hasrat Jaipuri	04:30	Picturisation on Vyjayanthimala, Dev Anand, Laxmi Chhaya and Johnny Walker
4	"Yeh Dharti Hindustan Ki"	Asha Bhosle	Gopaldas Neeraj	09:32	Featuring Vyjayanthimala with drama troupe
5	"Tuhi Meri Laxmi Tuhi Meri Chhaya"^{†}	Mohammed Rafi	Hasrat Jaipuri	04:19	Featuring Laxmi Chhaya and Johnny Walker
6	"Duniya Isi Ka Naam Hai"	Mukesh, Sharda	S. H. Bihari	05:08	Featuring the lead pair

^{†} Lyrics on actress Laxmi Chhaya

== Box office ==
At the end of its theatrical run, the film grossed around ₹ 180,000,00 with a net of ₹ 9,000,000 and was the tenth highest-grossing film of 1968 with a verdict of average success at Box Office India.

== Award ==
Filmfare Awards

- Best Cinematographer – Faredoon A. Irani
