= Chal Chal Re Naujawan =

- Directed by: Gyan Mukherjee
- Written by: Saadat Hasan Manto
- Starring: Ashok Kumar; Naseem Banu; Rafiq Ghaznavi
- Music by: Rafiq Ghaznavi; Ghulam Haider
- Release date: 1944
- Country: India
- Language: Hindustani

Chal Chal Re Naujawan (transl. Keep going, youngsters!) is a 1944 Indian Bollywood film. It was the seventh highest grossing Indian film of 1944.
