= Love in Bombay =

2013 Indian film by Joy Mukherjee

Love In Bombay
- Movie poster
- Directed by: Joy Mukherjee
- Produced by: Joy Mukherjee
- Starring: Ashok Kumar; Kishore Kumar; Joy Mukherjee; Waheeda Rehman; Rehman
- Music by: Shankar–Jaikishan
- Distributed by: PVR Director's Rare
- Release date: 2 August 2013
- Country: India
- Language: Hindi

Love In Bombay is a 2013 Indian Hindi-language romantic comedy film produced and directed by Joy Mukherjee. The film was originally made in 1971 and starred Ashok Kumar, Kishore Kumar, Joy Mukherjee, Waheeda Rehman, Rehman. It is the third film of Mukherjee's Love In trilogy, which includes Love In Simla and Love In Tokyo. Music director duo Shankar–Jaikishan had composed music for this film, which features songs by the legend artists of the golden era like Kishore Kumar, Mohammed Rafi and Asha Bhosle. Due to a lack of funds, this movie couldn't release in its own time. After Joy Mukherjee's death, his son Toy, with great efforts, arranged for the release of the movie.

== Plot ==
This film tells the story of a village boy named Baadal, (Joy Mukherjee), who unexpectedly encounters a girl from the city, Preeti, (Waheeda Rehman), under unusual circumstances. As the narrative progresses, the two individuals, coming from different backgrounds, develop a romantic connection.

However, their relationship faces opposition from Preeti's father, who desires for her to marry another suitor, Roshan. Roshan is revealed to be a scheming character who employs various methods to separate the couple. This sets the stage for a dramatic conflict, filled with elements of jealousy and challenges, as Baadal navigates this obstacle in his pursuit of marrying Preeti.

== Cast ==
- Joy Mukherjee as Baadal
- Waheeda Rehman as Preeti Mehra
- Ashok Kumar as Usman Bhai
- Kishore Kumar as Ganpat Rao
- Rehman as Mr. Mehra

== Production ==
After filmmaker Joy Mukherjee was unable to financially release his film "Love in Bombay" in the 1980s and 1990s, his son Toy took on the task decades later. Following Joy's passing in 2012, Toy overcame a period of depression to locate the film's negatives, which had been meticulously maintained by his father through annual manual cleaning at a cold storage facility. Despite 30-40% damage, Toy dedicated over a year to extensively restoring the film through cleaning, color correction, and sound improvements, finally bringing the long-shelved project to a releasable state.

== Soundtrack ==
Majrooh Sultanpuri wrote songs for the film and music was composed by Shankar–Jaikishan.

=== Track list ===
Song	Singer
"Rani Nacho Chhamak Chham, Aage Tum, Peechhe Hum"	Kishore Kumar, Mohammed Rafi
"Majha Naav Aahe Ganpatrao"	Kishore Kumar
"Jai Kali Kalkattewali"	Kishore Kumar
"Matak Mere Cheeta"	Kishore Kumar
"Saiyan Saiyan Saiyan"	Asha Bhosle
"Na Main Boli, Na Woh Bola"	Asha Bhosle
