= Joy Mukherjee =

Indian film actor, director and producer

- Born: 24 February 1939; Jhansi, United Provinces, British India (present-day Uttar Pradesh, India)
- Died: 9 March 2012 (aged 73); Mumbai, Maharashtra, India
- Occupations: Film actor; director; producer
- Years active: 1960–2012
- Height: 6 ft 2 in (188 cm)
- Spouse: Neelam Sodhi (m. 1966)
- Children: 3
- Father: Sashadhar Mukherjee
- Family: Mukherjee-Samarth family and Ganguly family

Joy Mukherjee (24 February 1939 – 9 March 2012) was an Indian actor and director. He was referred to as the 'Heart Throb' in his time as he was famously known for his romantic roles in 1960s And 1970s. He acted in 30 films.

== Family background ==
Joy Mukherjee was the son of Sashadhar Mukherjee and Sati Devi. His father was a successful producer and a co-founder of Filmalaya Studios. His uncles were director Subodh Mukherjee, Ashok Kumar, Anoop Kumar and Kishore Kumar. Joy Mukherjee was educated in Col. Brown Cambridge School in Dehradun and St. Xavier College.

He married Neelam Sodhi in 1966 and they had two sons Sujoy and Monjoy and a daughter Simran.

== Career ==
Joy debuted opposite Sadhana in the film Love in Simla (1960), directed by R. K. Nayyar. He then starred with Asha Parekh for several hits like Phir Wohi Dil Laya Hoon, Love in Tokyo, Ziddi and Hum Hindustani. Some of his films like Aao Pyar Karen and Shagird (opposite Saira Bano), Ek Musafir Ek Haseena with Sadhna, Ishaara with Vyjayantimala and Jee Chahta Hai with Rajashree were superhit movies. Most of his movies had hit music. By the late 1960s, acting roles began drying up, so he began directing and producing films.

He produced and directed Humsaya although it did not do well. Despite a late success with home production Ek Baar Muskura Do (1972) with brother Deb Mukherjee and later to be sister-in-law Tanuja, Joy faded from the silver screen.

He later directed Rajesh Khanna in Chailla Babu in 1977 which was a major box office success. This film's success solved his insolvency problems which arose due to production of Love in Bombay. In 1985, Rajesh Khanna gave him opportunity to play a villain in the film Insaaf Main Karoonga, which became the last successful film of Joy.

== Financial troubles ==
Love in Bombay brought financial trouble for Joy Mukherjee but his wife Neelam, who released the movie 40 years later, said that despite losing everything, the film remained very close to him. "This film was my husband's Waterloo. He lost everything he had in this film. He sunk in lot of his own money, major properties. There were 37 cases of insolvency against him. But he cleared everything and had a clean slate and started afresh. This film was very dear to him despite it bringing so much problems to him,". The 1973 film was the third part of the "Love in" series which started with Joy debuting with the blockbuster hit Love in Simla in 1960 and the golden jubilee hit Love in Tokyo in 1966. He came out of insolvency with the box office success of his sole successful directorial venture, Chailla Babu, in 1977.

== Death ==
Joy Mukherjee died on 9 March 2012 in Mumbai's Leelavati Hospital, exactly two weeks after his 73rd birthday, where he had been on a ventilator. He had a prolonged illness.

== Filmography ==
| Year | Title | Role | Notes |
|---|---|---|---|
| 1960 | Love in Simla | Dev Kumar Mehra | Debut With Sadhana |
| 1960 | Hum Hindustani | Satyendra Nath | |
| 1962 | Umeed | Shankar | |
| 1962 | Ek Musafir Ek Hasina | Ajay | |
| 1963 | Phir Wohi Dil Laya Hoon | Mohan | |
| 1964 | Aao Pyaar Karen | Kesha | |
| 1964 | Ji Chahta Hai | Parwana | |
| 1964 | Ishaara | Vijay | |
| 1964 | Ziddi | Ashok | |
| 1964 | Door Ki Awaz | Prakash | |
| 1965 | Bahu Beti | Shekhar | |
| 1966 | Love in Tokyo | Ashok | |
| 1966 | Yeh Zindagi Kitni Haseen Hai | Sanjay Malhotra | |
| 1966 | Saaz Aur Awaaz | Rajesh | |
| 1967 | Shagird | Ramesh | |
| 1968 | Ek Kali Muskayee | Dr. Dilip | |
| 1968 | Humsaya | Shyam / Lin Tan (Double Role) | Directed & Produced By Himself |
| 1968 | Dil Aur Mohabbat | Rajesh Choudhary | |
| 1969 | Dupatta | Himself | Punjabi Film |
| 1970 | Aag Aur Daag | Raja | |
| 1970 | Ehsan | Raja Prasad | |
| 1970 | Inspector | Inspector Rajesh / Agent 707 | |
| 1970 | Moojrim | Gopal | |
| 1970 | Puraskar | Rakesh | |
| 1971 | Kahin Aar Kahin Paar | CID Agent | |
| 1972 | Ek Bar Mooskura Do | Dr. Ashok | |
| 1977 | Haiwan | Major Anil Verma | |
| 1977 | Chhailla Babu | | Director |
| 1985 | Phoolan Devi | Bada Thakur | Bengali Film; Also Released in Hindi as "Kahani Phoolvati Ki" |
| 1985 | Insaaf Main Karoongaa | Shamsher Singh | |
| 2013 | Love in Bombay | Badal | Directed & Produced By Himself. Film was originally made in 1971 but released in 2013. |

== See also ==
- Pramod Chakravorty
