= Do Aankhen =

- Directed by: Ajoy Biswas
- Starring: Biswajeet; Rekha
- Release date: 1974
- Country: India
- Language: Hindi

Do Aankhen is a 1974 Bollywood drama film directed by Ajoy Biswas. The film stars Rekha.

== Cast ==
- Rekha
- Biswajeet
- Deb Mukherjee
- Kumari Naaz
- Jankidas
- I. S. Johar
- Ashok Kumar

== Music ==
Songs in the film were composed by music director Hans raj Bahl and the lyrics were written by Verma Malik.

Song	Singer
"Kamal Ke Phool Jaisa"	Mohammed Rafi
"Ladki Unnees Sau Sattar Ki"	Mohammed Rafi
"Khinch Kanta, Sathi Banke Dil Ke Dard Ka Dard Na Mera Banta"	Mohammed Rafi, Minoo Purushottam
"Babu Babu Dil Pe Nahin Kabu"	Asha Bhosle
