= Bahu Beti =

1965 film

Bahu Beti is a 1965 Hindi film starring Mala Sinha and Joy Mukherjee in the lead roles. The film was directed by Tatineni Prakash Rao

== Cast ==
- Joy Mukherjee as Shekhar
- Mala Sinha as Shanta
- Mumtaz as Savitri
- Mehmood as Mahesh
- Ashok Kumar as Judge
- Achala Sachdev as Mrs. Kaushalya
- Mukri as Kadam
- Dhumal as Nemak Das
- Ratnamala as Shekhar's mother
- Anoop Kumar as Gurudas
- Chaman Puri as Dhanpat Rai

== Soundtrack ==
1. "Jiyo Toh Aise Jiyo" - Mohammed Rafi
2. "Rangin Fiza Hai Aaja" - Mahendra Kapoor, Asha Bhosle
3. "Sab Me Shamil Ho Magar" - Mohammed Rafi
4. "Bharat Maa Ki Aankh Ke Taro" - Asha Bhosle
5. "Meri Jaan Na Sata Tu" - Mohammed Rafi
6. "Meri Mang Ke Rang Me" - Asha Bhosle
7. "Aaj Hai Karva Chauth" - Asha Bhosle
