= Ek Musafir Ek Hasina =

Ek Musafir Ek Hasinaa
- DVD cover
- Directed by: Raj Khosla
- Written by: Raj Khosla
- Produced by: Sashadhar Mukherjee
- Starring: Joy Mukherjee; Sadhana
- Cinematography: Fali Mistry
- Edited by: S. E. Chandiwale
- Music by: O. P. Nayyar; Raja Mehdi Ali Khan (lyrics)
- Release date: 1962
- Country: India
- Language: Hindi
- Box office: ₹2,50,00,000

Ek Musafir Ek Hasina (English: A Traveller and A Beauty) is a 1962 Bollywood film directed by Raj Khosla and starring Joy Mukherjee, Sadhana in lead roles. The plot of the film is loosely inspired by the classic Hollywood film, Random Harvest. The film was produced by Sashadhar Mukherjee. The film's music is by O. P. Nayyar.

The film became a hit at the box office in 1962.

The director Raj Khosla would later cast the heroine Sadhana in three more suspense thrillers: Woh Kaun Thi? (1964), Mera Saaya (1966) and Anita (1967).

== Plot ==
Ajay Mehra is on a secret mission to Kashmir to counter Pakistan backed terrorist right after Independence. While on the mission, he is injured due to a bomb blast. A girl, Asha from a poor family, is forced to flee for her own safety following an attack on her house by Pakistan backed terrorist. She comes across Ajay, who is injured. She nurses him back to health over a period of time and they start falling in love with each other. But after the bomb blast, Ajay has lost his memory. Hence they both decide to go to Srinagar to get treatment for him at a hospital. But Ajay gets some clue from his things and decides to go to Bombay to find the truth about himself.

In Bombay, while searching for some more clues, Ajay sees bank robbers fleeing after robbing a bank. He tries to stop them and is hit by their car. In the process, he recognises the robbers to be from Continental Hotel, where he was looking for clues. He is then taken to a hospital where his brother comes to meet him. Due to this accident, he starts regaining some parts of his memory. But he has completely forgotten about the last six months.

The robbers decide to kill Ajay as he has recognised them. They send a group member's wife to Ajay's house and there she claims to be his wife. Looking for Ajay, Asha also reaches his home. But Ajay fails to recognise her. Finding it suspicious, Police keep an eye on both women. The robbers try to kill Ajay several times, but are unsuccessful as he discovers their plans. The police and Ajay draw up a plan to fool the robbers. They fake Ajay's death and, relieved by that, the robbers stop hiding and are then caught by police. In the last fight, Ajay again loses consciousness, but regains his full memory later on. Ajay and Asha get married in the end.

== Cast ==
- Joy Mukherjee as Lieutenant Ajay Mehra
- Sadhana Shivdasani as Asha
- Dhumal as Ultaram
- Rajendra Nath as Sultaram
- Malika as Kamini
- Jagdish Raj as Inspector Jagdish
- Kamal Kapoor as Ranjeet

== Music ==
The music is composed by O. P. Nayyar on lyrics written by S. H. Bihari, Raja Mehdi Ali Khan and Shewan Rizvi. The song "Aap Yun Hi Agar Humse Milte Rahe" is based on Kedar rag.

| Song | Singer | Raga |
|---|---|---|
| "Mujhe Dekhkar" | Mohammed Rafi | |
| "Phir Tere Shehar Mein" | Mohammed Rafi | |
| "Humko Tumhare Ishq Ne" | Mohammed Rafi | |
| "Bahut Shukriya, Badi Meharbani" | Mohammed Rafi, Asha Bhosle | |
| "Aap Yun Hi Agar Humse Milte Rahe" | Mohammed Rafi, Asha Bhosle | Kedar (raga) |
| "Main Pyar Ka Rahi Hoon, Teri Zulf Ke Saye Mein" | Mohammed Rafi, Asha Bhosle | Kirwani |
| "Tumhe Mohabbat Hai Humse Mana" | Mohammed Rafi, Asha Bhosle | |
| "Zabaan-E-Yaar, Man Turki, Nami Daanam" | Mohammed Rafi, Asha Bhosle | |
| "Udhar Woh Chaal Chalte Hai" | Asha Bhosle | |
| "Meri Nazren Haseen Hai" | Asha Bhosle | |
