= Balwant =

Balwant is a given name. Notable people with the name include:

- Balwant Gargi (1916–2003), Punjabi dramatist, novelist, and short story writer
- Balwant Singh of Bharatpur (1820–1853), the ruling Maharaja of princely state Bharatpur from 1825
- Dattatray Balwant Parasnis (1870–1926), historian from Maharashtra, India
- Vasudeo Balwant Phadke (1845–1883), Indian revolutionary in the armed struggle for India's independence
- Balwant Singh Rakkha (born 1941), Fiji Indian medical doctor and a member of the House of Representatives of Fiji
- Balwant Singh Ramoowalia (born 1942), active politician and president of Lok Bhalai Party (LBP)

== See also ==
- Balwant Rai Mehta Committee, committee appointed by the Government of India in 1957
