= Rakhi (1962 film) =

- Directed by: A. Bhimsingh
- Written by: A. Bhimsingh (screenplay), Rajendra Krishan (dialogue and lyrics)
- Based on: Pasamalar (Tamil)(1961) by A. Bhimsingh
- Produced by: Sivaji Ganesan
- Starring: Ashok Kumar; Pradeep Kumar; Waheeda Rehman; Mehmood
- Cinematography: G. Vittal Rao
- Edited by: A.Paul Duraisingh; R. Thirumala
- Music by: Ravi
- Release date: 1962
- Country: India
- Language: Hindi

Rakhi (transl. The sacred thread) is a 1962 Indian Hindi-language drama film directed by A. Bhimsingh and starring Ashok Kumar, Waheeda Rehman, Pradeep Kumar and Mehmood. A major success, This film had Kumar winning the Filmfare Award for Best Actor for his performance and screenwriter K. P. Kottarakara won the Filmfare Award for Best Story. It was nominated for a Filmfare Award for Best Movie and Mehmood was nominated for the Filmfare Award for Best Supporting Actor. The film was shot at Neptune Studios in Chennai. This film was a remake of the Tamil film Pasamalar, which went on to be remade again in Hindi as Aisa Pyaar Kahan.

== Cast ==
- Ashok Kumar as Raj Kumar "Raju"
- Pradeep Kumar as Anand
- Waheeda Rehman as Radha
- Mehmood as Kasturi
- Madan Puri as Advocate Ramesh Chandra
- Raj Mehra as Raju's Boss
- Randhir as Shankar
- Shivraj as Bhagwandas Chaudhary
- Mohan Choti as Mohan
- Ameeta as Malti Chandra
- Malika as Rani
- Lalita Pawar as Nandini

== Music ==
All lyrics are written by Rajinder Krishan.

Song	Singer
"Kab Tak Bol Gori Aise"	Lata Mangeshkar
"Babul Ka Ghar Chhodke"	Lata Mangeshkar
"Saiyan Chhod De Baiyan, Mori Patli Kalaiyan"	Lata Mangeshkar, Mukesh
"Rakhi Dhaagon Ka Tyohar"	Mohammed Rafi
"Ya Meri Manzil Bata Ya"	Mohammed Rafi
"Ae Ishq Teri Jai Ho"	Mohammed Rafi
"Dekho Mehnat Se Daulat Ki Yaari"	Mohammed Rafi, Asha Bhosle
"Sitaron Aaj To Hum Bhi"	Asha Bhosle
