= Asli Naqli =

1986 film directed by Sudarsan Nag

- Promotional Poster
- Directed by: Sudharshaan Nag
- Written by: K. C. Bokadia
- Produced by: M.A.K.Hilal
- Starring: Shatrughan Sinha; Rajinikanth; Anita Raj; Radhika
- Cinematography: Sudharshan Nag
- Music by: Laxmikant Pyarelal
- Release date: 17 October 1986
- Running time: 2 hours 8 min
- Language: Hindi

Asli Naqli (transl. Real and Fake) is a 1986 Hindi-language film directed by Sudarsan Nag. It stars Shatrughan Sinha and Rajinikanth with Anita Raj and Radhika playing their female leads respectively. It was a box office hit. The movie was dubbed in Tamil as Thaayin Meedhu Sabatham.

== Plot ==
Seth Laxmi Narayan and his wife had a son who was separated at an early age. The only clue they have is that he has a locket around his neck. When Laxmi Narayan passes away, he leaves behind a lot of money and wealth. His wife makes efforts to locate her long-lost son, with the help of her relative, Durjan Singh. Durjan Singh hires a local thug, Birju, and asks him to pose as the long-lost son, for a hefty price, to which he agrees. Mrs. Narayan welcomes Birju as her son, and accepts him, little knowing his agenda, and the evil scheme devised by Durjan Singh and his son.

== Cast ==
- Shatrughan Sinha as Vijay
- Rajinikanth as Birju Ustad
- Anita Raj as Anita
- Radhika as Vijay's sister
- Shakti Kapoor as Shakti Singh
- Ashok Kumar as Driver / Chacha (uncle)
- Amrish Puri as Durjan Singh
- Beena Banerjee as Birju's mother
- Rakesh Bedi as Sub-Insp. Chamanlal
- Bharat Bhushan as Priest
- Seema Deo as Mrs. Laxmi Narayan (Anita's mother)
- Goga Kapoor as Goga
- Satyen Kappu as Seth Laxmi Narayan
- Gurbachchan Singh as Goga's man
- Tiku Talsania as Tiku

== Soundtrack ==
Music is composed by Laxmikant–Pyarelal, while all the songs are written by S.H. Bihari.

1	"Duniya Bhar Ko Dhokha Dekar"	Anuradha Paudwal, Shabbir Kumar, Laxmikant
2	"Ek To Ye Bharpur Jawani"	Kavita Krishnamurthy, Dilraj Kaur
3	"Kya Asli Hai Kya Naqli Hai"	Anup Jalota
4	"Teri Botal Ban Gayi Sautan"	Kavita Krishnamurthy, Laxmikant
5	"Roj Milte Ho Babuji Mele Me"	Kavita Krishnamurthy
