= Puraskar =

- पुरस्कार
- Starring: Joy Mukherjee; Farida Jalal; I. S. Johar
- Music by: R. D. Burman; S. H. Bihari (lyrics)
- Release date: 1970
- Country: India
- Language: Hindi

Puraskar is a 1970 Bollywood action film. The film stars Joy Mukherjee and Farida Jalal.

== Cast ==
- Abhi Bhattacharya ... Mr. Das / Mr. Dinanath
- Joy Mukherjee ... Rakesh
- I. S. Johar ... Sumesh
- Farida Jalal ... Reshma
- Helen... Rita
- Faryal ... No.7 / Anita
- Bipin Gupta
- Rajan Haksar ... Raghu
- Ram Kumar
- Sapana ... Renu Das

== Plot ==
Rakesh and Sumesh are two plain-clothes agents in the city's Criminal Investigations Department. They have been entrusted the task of locating a missing, believed to be abducted scientist, Mr. Das. They are assisted in this search by Renu Das, the daughter of Mr. Das. They manage to locate Mr. Das, and bring him safely to his house. His daughter is delighted to have her dad back. But then a series of odd coincidences lead Renu to conclude that her father has changed for the worse since she last saw him.

== Soundtrack ==
Music composed by R. D. Burman, lyrics by S. H. Bihari.

#	Song	Singer
1	"Yeh Nasheeli Meri Aankhen"	Asha Bhosle
2	"Dekh To Kya Hai Aaj Ki Mehfil"	Asha Bhosle
3	"Ae Meri Jaan, Chand Sa Gora Mukhda"	Asha Bhosle, Mukesh
4	"Nateeja Hamari Mohabbat Ka Kya Hai"	Asha Bhosle, Mukesh
5	"Nazar Mein Bijli, Badan Mein Sholay"	Mahendra Kapoor
