= Benazir =

Benazir, or Binazir (Persian: بی‌نَظِیر, romanized: bēnazīr, lit. 'unparalleled') may refer to:

== Women ==
- Benazir Bhutto (1953–2007), Pakistani politician and Prime Minister of Pakistan (1988-1990 and 1993-1996)
- Benazir Charles (born 1992), Dutch model and beauty queen
- Benazir Hussain (born 1972), British-Indian ballerina
- Benazir Salam (born 1979), Bangladeshi dancer
- Benazir Shaikh, actress in the Indian TV show Agadam Bagdam Tigdam

== Men ==
- Benazir Ahmed (born 1963), 30th Inspector General of the Bangladesh Police

== Fictional characters ==
- Benazir, principal character in the 1964 Hindi film Benazir
- Benazir, courtesan and vishakanya in the Indian TV series Jodha Akbar

== See also ==
- Benajir Ahmed (1903–1983), Bangladeshi poet and writer
- Benzir Ahmed (born 1952), Bangladeshi politician
