= Sardar (1955 film) =

- Film poster
- Directed by: Gyan Mukherjee
- Starring: Ashok Kumar; Bina Rai
- Music by: Jaganmoy Mitra
- Release date: 1955
- Country: India
- Language: Hindi

Sardar is a 1955 Indian film directed by Gyan Mukherjee. It stars Ashok Kumar, Bina Rai in lead roles.

== Music ==
Song	Singer
"Chal Ri Chali Chal Naiya"	Hemant Kumar
"Barkha Ki Raat Mein"	Geeta Dutt
"Pyar Ki Yeh Talkhiyan"	Lata Mangeshkar
"Hansa Sake, Rula Sake"	Lata Mangeshkar
"Neend Nigodi Ban Gayi"	Lata Mangeshkar
"Aayi Jhumke Deewani"	Asha Bhosle
"Khili Kali Arman Ki"	Asha Bhosle
"Jab Se Nazar Mili"	Asha Bhosle
