= Love in Simla =

- Poster
- Directed by: R. K. Nayyar
- Written by: Agha Jani; R. K. Nayyar
- Produced by: Sashadhar Mukherjee
- Starring: Joy Mukherjee; Sadhana
- Cinematography: D. K. Dhuri
- Edited by: Indu Kumar
- Music by: Iqbal Qureshi
- Release date: 1960
- Country: India
- Language: Hindi

Love in Simla is a 1960 Indian romance film, produced by Sashadhar Mukherjee and his Filmalaya production house. Directed by R. K. Nayyar, who co-wrote the script with Agha Jani, the film had the producer's son, Joy Mukherjee, in the lead role. The actress Sadhana made her Hindi movie lead debut in the film and became a star. The film also starred Azra, Shobhana Samarth and Durga Khote. The film was a light musical with humour as well as slapstick comedy. It became a hit at the box office. The film is a part of the Love in trilogy. The film was inspired by the 1938 English film Jane Steps Out.

== Plot ==
After the untimely death of her father and mother, Sonia is orphaned and lives with her aunt and paternal uncle (General and Mrs. Rajpal Singh). Sonia is plain-looking, like her real mother, and often invites unappreciative taunts and critical remarks from her aunt and cousin, Sheela. Sheela has a boyfriend, Dev Kumar Mehra, and she plans to marry him. Fed-up with hearing frequent taunts and adverse remarks about her plain-looks, Sonia challenges Sheela that she will make Dev fall in love with her.

== Songs ==
Lyrics of all songs were written by Rajendra Krishan.

1. "Dil Tham Chale Hum Aaj Kidhar" – Mohammed Rafi
2. "Love Ka Matlab Hai Pyar" – Mohammed Rafi, Asha Bhosle
3. "Gaal Gulabi Kiske Hai" – Mohammed Rafi
4. "Alif Zabar Aaa Alif Zer Ae Alif Pesh O" – Mohammed Rafi, Sudha Malhotra
5. "Ae Baby Ae Jee Idhar Aao" – Asha Bhosle, Mohammed Rafi
6. "Hasinon Ki Sawari Hai" – Mohammed Rafi, Suman Kalyanpur
7. "Kiya Hai Dilruba Pyar Bhi Kabhi" – Mohammed Rafi, Asha Bhosle
8. "Dar Pe Aaye Hain" – Mukesh
9. "Muskuraye Khet Pyase Tarse Tarse" – Mohammed Rafi, Suman Kalyanpur
10. "Husnwale Wafa Nahi Karte" – Mohammed Rafi, Shamshad Begum
11. "Dil Tham Chale Hum Aaj Kidhar v2" – Mohammed Rafi
12. "Yoon Zindagi ke raaste sanwaarte chale gaye" – Mohammed Rafi

== Cast ==
- Joy Mukherjee as Dev Kumar Mehra
- Sadhana as Sonia Singh
- Azra as Sheela Singh (Sonia's cousin)
- Kishore Sahu as General Rajpal Singh (Sonia's uncle)
- Shobhna Samarth as Mrs. Rajpal Singh (Sheela's mom)
- Durga Khote as Sonia's grandmother
- Vijayalaxmi as Vijaya
- Hari Shivdasani as Announcer
- Master Ramesh
- Bazid Khan
- Fouza Singh
- Ravi Tandon
- Saibee Sabherwal
- Kiran Kumar
- Cesar
- Muhammad Ali

== Box office ==
In India, Love in Simla was the fifth highest-grossing film of 1960. It grossed ₹1.7 crore in 1960.

In the Soviet Union, the film was released in 1963 and came third place on the year's Soviet box office chart. The film drew a Soviet box office audience of 35 million viewers, making it one of the top 20 most successful Indian films in the Soviet Union.

== Sequels ==
Love in Simla had 2 sequels thus forming a trilogy. The first one was Love in Tokyo starring Mukherjee and Asha Parekh in the lead roles and was released in 1966 and the second one was Love in Bombay starring Mukherjee and Waheeda Rehman which released in 2013 due to going over the budget.
