= Baharon Ki Manzil (1968 film) =

Hindi film

- Directed by: Yakub Hassan Rizvi
- Starring: Meena Kumari; Dharmendra; Rehman; Anwar Hashmi
- Narrated by: Yash
- Music by: Laxmikant Pyarelal
- Release date: May 15, 1968
- Country: India
- Language: Hindi

Baharon Ki Manzil is a 1968 Hindi film directed by Yakub Hassan Rizvi and filmed in Darjeeling. The film stars Meena Kumari, Dharmendra, Rehman and Farida Jalal. The film's music is by Laxmikant Pyarelal.

== Plot ==
The Darjeeling-based Roy family consists of Subodh, his wife, Nanda, and their daughter, Nalini. On the occasion of Nalini's engagement ceremony with Mohan, a number of celebrations take place, including fireworks, which result in Nanda's accident, she passes out, is treated for minor injuries, and is allowed to recuperate. The next morning she wakes up claiming that she is Radha; that Nalini is not her daughter; and that Subodh is her brother-in-law. She also states that she is to marry Ram Kumar of Bombay. Fearing that his wife is losing her sanity, Subodh first summons their family doctor, Dr. Verma, and then a Psychiatrist, Dr. Rajesh Khanna. Rajesh conducts some tests on Nanda and concludes that her brain activity is normal. Then Nanda sees a dead woman's body in her closet, which subsequently disappears when the others arrive; she also tries to kill herself – in vain. On her insistence, Subodh and she travel to Bombay to unravel this mystery – to no avail, and they return home. Then Nanda recalls a dressmaker named Glory D'Silva, and Rajesh undertakes the journey to Byculla, Bombay, and brings Glory back – who positively identifies Nanda and states that Radha, Nanda's sister, and her parents were all killed in a fire 16 years ago. The question remains, if Radha is dead, then why is Nanda claiming that she is her, and why is she unable to recollect the last 16 years of her life as Subodh's wife, and Nalini's mother?

== Cast ==
- Meena Kumari as Nanda Roy / Radha Shukla
- Dharmendra as Dr. Rajesh Khanna
- Rehman as Subodh Roy
- Farida Jalal as Nalini S. S. Roy
- Tun Tun as Glory D'Silva
- Malika as Ballet Dancer / Singer
- Polson as Roy's butler
- Shefali as Rosy
- Ramayan Tiwari as Roy's goon

== Soundtrack ==
All music composed by Laxmikant–Pyarelal.

#	Song	Singer
1	"Nigahen Kyon Bhatakti Hai"	Lata Mangeshkar
2	"Aaja Re Piya"	Lata Mangeshkar
3	"Yeh Daman Ab Na Chhutega Kabhi"	Lata Mangeshkar
4	"Janam Din Aaya"	Lata Mangeshkar
