= Abhinetri (1970 film) =

1970 film

- Poster
- Directed by: Subodh Mukherjee
- Written by: Samir Ganguly; D.N. Mukherjee; Subhash Mukherjee; Subodh Mukehrji; Ehsan Rizvi
- Produced by: Subodh Mukherjee
- Starring: Shashi Kapoor; Hema Malini; Nirupa Roy
- Cinematography: N.V. Srinivas
- Edited by: V.N. Naik
- Music by: Laxmikant–Pyarelal
- Production companies: Filmalaya Studio; Filmistan Studio
- Distributed by: Subodh Mukherjee Productions; United Producers
- Release date: 12 May 1970
- Country: India
- Language: Hindi

Abhinetri (lit. 'Actress') is a 1970 Indian Hindi film produced and directed by Subodh Mukherjee. The film stars Shashi Kapoor, Hema Malini, Nirupa Roy, Nazima, Asit Sen and Deb Mukherjee. The music composed by Laxmikant Pyarelal includes the song "Sa Re Ga Ma Pa" by Lata Mangeshkar and Kishore Kumar, besides the hit Lata Mangeshkar solo "O Ghata Sanwari".

== Plot ==
A chance meeting between an Assistant Scientist, Shekar, and an established stage dancer and singer, Anjana, results in love. While Shekar has a mother who lives separately, Anjana has been orphaned at an early age. Shekar's mother approves of Anjana and both get married. Anjana stops her involvement in dancing and singing, and both spent the next several months in relative harmony. Then Anjana finds that Shekar is spending more and more time in the laboratory than with her, and she decides to take up dancing and singing, which does not sit well with Shekar. Arguments ensue, and both decide to live separately. When Shekar's mother comes to visit Shekar, both he and Anjana compromise to live together. This, they think, would provide relief to their mother in her old age. Living together, they discover the missing spice in their marriage at the end.

== Cast ==
- Shashi Kapoor as Shekhar
- Hema Malini as Anjana
- Nirupa Roy as Shekhar's Mother
- Nazir Hussain as Dr. Niranjan Das
- Asit Sen as Narayan
- Badri Prasad as Anjana's Uncle
- Bela Bose
- Deb Mukherjee as Dancer (song "Milte Hi Rahenge Hum")

== Soundtrack ==
All songs were written by Majrooh Sultanpuri.

#	Title	Singer(s)	Raga
1	"Sa Re Ga Ma Pa"	Kishore Kumar, Lata Mangeshkar	
2	"O Ghata Sanwari"	Lata Mangeshkar	Kalavati
3	"Milte Hi Rahenge Hum"	Lata Mangeshkar, Mahendra Kapoor	
4	"Dhadkan Har Dil Ki"	Lata Mangeshkar	
5	"Khinche Hamse Sanware"	Lata Mangeshkar	
6	"Sajna O Sajna"	Lata Mangeshkar	
7	"Bane Bade Raja"	Asha Bhosle	
