= Bandish (1955 film) =

1955 film by Satyen Bose

- Directed by: Satyen Bose
- Written by: Jyotirmoy Roy (screenplay); Govind Moonis (dialogues); Satyen Bose (scenario)
- Produced by: Spar
- Starring: Ashok Kumar; Meena Kumari; Daisy Irani
- Cinematography: Madan Sinha
- Edited by: G. G. Mayekar
- Music by: Hemant Kumar
- Production company: Basu Chitra Mandir
- Distributed by: Basu Chitra Mandir
- Release date: 1955
- Running time: 129 minutes
- Country: India
- Language: Hindi

Bandish (transl. Restriction) is a 1955 black and white Indian Hindi-language film The film stars Ashok Kumar, Meena Kumari, Daisy Irani in lead roles. The film was directed by Satyen Bose.

== Cast ==
- Ashok Kumar as Kamal Roy
- Meena Kumari as Usha Sen
- Daisy Irani as Tomato
- Nazir Hussain as Mahendra
- Bipin Gupta as Shivnath Roy
- Pratima Devi as Mrs. Roy
- Shammi as Kavita
- Bhanu Banerjee as Ganesh
- Sajjan Lal Purohit as Madan
- Bhagwan Abhaji Palav as the balloon seller who performs the song "Lelo Ji Hamare Gubbare"
- Mehmood Ali as the boatswain who performs the song "Yeh Duniya Ek Saagar Hai"
- Indira Bansal as Lata
- Brahm Bharadwaj
- Dev Kishan Ahuja
- Roop Kumar

== Crew ==
- Director – Satyen Bose
- Writer – Jyotirmoy Roy (screenplay), Govind Moonis (dialogues), Satyen Bose (scenario)
- Music – Hemant Kumar
- Lyricist – Prem Dhawan, Raja Mehdi Ali Khan, S. H. Bihari, Ravi Shankar Sharma
- Playback Singers – Lata Mangeshkar, Asha Bhosle, Mohammed Rafi, Hemant Kumar
- Cinematographer – Madan Sinha
- Editor – G. G. Mayekar
- Choreographer – Sachin Shankar

== Soundtrack ==
The film had six songs in it. The music of the film was composed by Hemant Kumar.

Song	Singer	Lyricist	Whether used in the film itself ?(yes/no)
"Raat Hai Suhani Nindiya Rani"	Lata Mangeshkar	Shamsul Huda Bihari	Yes
"Jhoomti Jawani Hai Rut Mastani"	Lata Mangeshkar	Shamsul Huda Bihari	No
"Tumhari Yaad Mein O Mere Balmaa"	Lata Mangeshkar	Ravi Shankar Sharma	Yes
"Yeh Duniya Ek Saagar Hai"	Hemant Kumar	Prem Dhawan	Yes
"Mohe Apna Bana Lo"	Asha Bhosle	Prem Dhawan	No
"Le Lo Ji Hamare Gubbare"	Mohammed Rafi	Raja Mehdi Ali Khan	Yes
