= Subodh Mukherjee =

Indian filmmaker

Subodh Mukerji
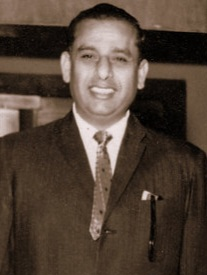
- Born: 14 April 1921; Jhansi, United Provinces, British India
- Died: 21 May 2005 (aged 84); Mumbai, Maharashtra, India
- Occupations: Filmmaker, producer, director
- Years active: 1953–1986
- Spouse: Kamala Mukerji
- Children: 3
- Family: Mukherjee-Samarth family

Subodh Mukerji (14 April 1921 – 21 May 2005) was an Indian filmmaker (producer and director) of Hindi-language films. He was the brother of the leading producer-director Sashadhar Mukherjee.

== Profile ==
Mukerji was a devotee of the school of movie-making that believed that films were all about great storytelling. In the first two decades of his career, his films had a high success percentage. He continued making movies till the late 1960s before retiring.

He has three children, Subhash, Geetanjali and Sanjoy.

== Filmography ==
| Year | Title | Producer | Director |
|---|---|---|---|
| 1955 | Munimji | Sashadhar Mukherjee | Yes |
| 1957 | Paying Guest | Sashadhar Mukherjee | Yes |
| 1959 | Love Marriage | Yes | Yes |
| 1961 | Junglee | Yes | Yes |
| 1964 | April Fool | Yes | Yes |
| 1966 | Saaz Aur Awaaz | Yes | Yes |
| 1967 | Shagird | Yes | Samir Ganguly |
| 1970 | Abhinetri | Yes | Yes |
| 1971 | Sharmeelee | Yes | Samir Ganguly |
| 1982 | Teesri Aankh | Subir Mukherjee | Yes |
| 1985 | Ulta Seedha | Yes | Yes |
