= Isi Ka Naam Duniya Hai =

Issi Ka Naam Dunia Hai
- Directed by: Shakti Samanta
- Starring: Ashok Kumar; Shyama; Mehmood
- Music by: Ravi
- Release date: 1962
- Country: India
- Language: Hindi

Issi Ka Naam Dunia Hai (lit. 'This is what the world is') is a 1962 Hindi film starring Ashok Kumar, Shyama in lead roles and directed by Shakti Samanta.

== Soundtrack ==
Song	Singer
"Isi Ka Naam Duniya Hai"	Ravi
"Yeh Mehfil, Yeh Botal"	Mohammed Rafi
"Jahan Jayenge Deewane"	Mohammed Rafi
"Akadkar Ja Rahe Hai, Jaiye, Pachhtaiyega"	Mohammed Rafi, Asha Bhosle
"Madhuban Mein Shyam Ki"	Asha Bhosle
"Mujhko Sahara Denewale"	Asha Bhosle
"Ya Habibi, O Aa Kareebi"	Asha Bhosle
"Aane Aane, Do Do Aane, Le Lo Khilone Saste"	Asha Bhosle, Sudha Malhotra
