= Inspector (1970 film) =

1970 film directed by Chand

- Directed by: Chand
- Starring: Joy Mukherjee; Helen
- Music by: N. Datta
- Production company: Kapoor Films
- Release date: 1970
- Country: India
- Language: Hindi

Inspector is a 1970 Bollywood Spy thriller film directed by Chand and produced by S.K. Kapur. The film stars Joy Mukherjee, Alka and Helen in lead roles.

== Plot ==
The film is about an Indian terrorist who attempts to release a poisonous gas into the atmosphere. A patriotic Indian agent, inspector Rajesh is trying to stop him.

== Cast ==
- Joy Mukherjee as Inspector Rajesh / Agent 707
- Alka as Rita
- Jayant as Marshal
- M. B. Shetty as Pinto
- Helen as Hotel Flamenco Dancer
- Sheikh Mukhtar
- Jayant
- Zeb Rehman

== Soundtrack ==
Song	Singer
"Bura Tum Na Maano To Ek Baat Keh Doon"	Mohammed Rafi, Asha Bhosle
"Ae Husn-E-Yaar"	Asha Bhosle
"Pee Lo, Pee Lo"	Asha Bhosle
"Yeh Tera Dil"	Asha Bhosle
"Kisi Ki Patli Kamar"	Mahendra Kapoor
