= Bandhan (1940 film) =

1940 film

- Directed by: N.R. Acharya
- Written by: J.S. Casshyap, Amiya Chakrabarty
- Produced by: Sashadhar Mukherjee
- Starring: Ashok Kumar; Leela Chitnis
- Music by: Saraswati Devi; Kavi Pradeep (lyrics)
- Production company: Bombay Talkies
- Release date: 1940
- Country: India
- Language: Hindi
- Box office: ₹50 lakh

Film sound track

Bandhan is a 1940 Indian Hindi-language film directed by N.R. Acharya and starring Leela Chitnis, Ashok Kumar and Suresh. It was the second highest grossing Indian film of 1940. It was produced by Bombay Talkies.

== Cast ==
- Leela Chitnis as Beena
- Ashok Kumar as Nirmal
- Suresh as Ram
- P.F. Pithawala as Zamindar
- V.H. Desai as Bholanath
- Shah Nawaz as Suresh
- Purnima Desai as Gauri
- Jagannath as Gokul
- Arun Kumar as Chanachurwala

== Plot ==
A tale of mistaken identities, social class, promises, and honor. Beena, the daughter of a village zamindar, has been engaged since childhood to the imperious Suresh yet finds herself falling in love with Nirmal, the new headmaster of the village school. Suresh and his cunning father Gokul plot to keep the lovers apart.
