= Deb Mukherjee =

Indian actor (1941–2025)

- Born: 22 November 1941; Kanpur, United Provinces, British India
- Died: 14 March 2025 (aged 83); Mumbai, Maharashtra, India
- Occupation: Actor
- Years active: 1965–2009
- Spouse(s): Manisha Mukherjee (divorced); Amrit Mukherjee
- Children: Sunita Gowariker; Ayan Mukerji
- Father: Sashadhar Mukherjee
- Relatives: Ashutosh Gowariker (son-in-law)
- Family: Ganguly family and Mukherjee-Samarth family

Deb Mukherjee (22 November 1941 – 14 March 2025) was an Indian actor. His daughter Sunita (from his first marriage) is married to director Ashutosh Gowariker, while his son (from his second marriage) is director Ayan Mukerji.

== Life and career ==
Mukherjee was part of the famous Mukherjee-Samarth family whose involvement with the film industry spans four generations, beginning from the 1930s. His father was Sashadhar Mukherjee, the owner of Filmalaya studios, who produced Love in Shimla (1960). His mother, Satidevi Mukherjee (Née Ganguly), was the only sister of Ashok Kumar, Anup Kumar and Kishore Kumar. His brothers were Joy Mukherjee, a successful actor in the 1960s and Shomu Mukherjee, the husband of actress Tanuja. His nieces are actresses Kajol and Tanisha. Other members of his family include Rani Mukerji and Sharbani Mukherjee.

== Death ==
Mukherjee died on 14 March 2025, at the age of 83. His funeral was held at the Pawan Hans Crematorium in Vile Parle, Mumbai.

== Filmography ==
Year	Film	Role	Notes
1965	Tu Hi Meri Zindagi	Rocky	
1969	Sambandh	Manav	
1969	Aansoo Ban Gaye Phool	Chandrashekhar	
1970	Abhinetri	Dancer	
1971	Adhikar	Shyam	
1972	Ek Bar Mooskura Do	Dilip / Kumar	
1972	Zindagi Zindagi	Heera	
1974	Do Aankhen		
1977	Haiwan		
1978	Main Tulsi Tere Aangan Ki	Pratap Chauhan	
1979	Baton Baton Mein	Peter	
1983	Karate	Desh	
1992	Jo Jeeta Wohi Sikander	Sports Coach of Rajput College	
1992	Bandhu	Ajit Bihari	
1993	King Uncle	Guest appearance	
1993	Aasoo Bane Angaarey		
1993	Dalaal	Girdhari	
1995	Rock Dancer	Raj Malhotra / Deepak Malhotra	
1997	Gudgudee	Shekhar	
2009	Kaminey	Mujeeb	
