= Pyar Kiya Hai Pyar Karenge =

- Directed by: Vijay Reddy
- Starring: Anil Kapoor; Padmini Kolhapure; Anita Raj; Ashok Kumar
- Release date: 4 July 1986
- Country: India
- Language: Hindi

Pyar Kiya Hai Pyar Karenge is a 1986 Indian Hindi film directed by Vijay Reddy and released in 1986. The movie stars Anil Kapoor, Ashok Kumar, Padmini Kolhapure and Anita Raj. It is a remake of the director's own hit Kannada movie Naa Ninna Mareyalare.

== Plot ==
Anand is a Hindu orphan living with a Muslim guardian, Abdul Rehman, in northernmost India. Anand is a champion skier, and one day Usha watches him ski, and falls in love with him. When they are introduced, Anand too falls in love with Usha. When Usha's mother, Annapurnadevi discovers this romance, she instructs Usha not to step out of the house without her permission, and forbids her to ever see Anand again. When Anand persists, Annapurna relents and tells them that she will arrange their marriage, but instead she forces Usha to marry the son of N.N. Shukla. When Anand finds out he is devastated, and finds solace in the company of his boss's daughter, Shobha. Years later, Anand and Usha meet and tell each other that they are happily married with children. But the tragic truth lies elsewhere.

== Cast ==
- Anil Kapoor as Anand
- Padmini Kolhapure as Usha
- Anita Raj as Shobha
- Ashok Kumar as Abdul Rehman
- Sushma Seth as Annapurnadevi
- Baby Guddu as baby Usha

== Songs ==
1. "Sau Saal Tak Rahe Ye Zamana" - Shabbir Kumar
2. "Pyar Kiya Hai Pyar Karenge" - Kavita Krishnamurthy, Shabbir Kumar
3. "Mithi Mithi Sardi Hai Bhigi Bhigi Rate Hai" - Lata Mangeshkar, Mohammed Aziz
4. "Tujhko Mai Ye Dile Barbad" - Shabbir Kumar
5. "Meri Chhoti Si Bagiya Ki Nanhi Kali" - Mohammed Aziz
6. "Tujhko Mai Ye Dile Barbad (Version 2)" - Shabbir Kumar
