= Ek Kali Muskai =

Ek Kali Muskayee
- Directed by: Vasant Joglekar
- Starring: Ashok Kumar; Joy Mukherjee; Meera Joglekar; Nirupa Roy; Mehmood; Om Prakash
- Music by: Madan Mohan
- Release date: 1968
- Country: India
- Language: Hindi

Ek Kali Muskayee is a 1968 Bollywood drama film starring Ashok Kumar, Joy Mukherjee and Meera Joglekar in the lead roles. The music album was composed by maestro Madan Mohan while songs like "Na Tum Bewafa Ho" by Lata Mangeshkar. Also title song 'Lo Ek Kali Muskayi' and 'Zulf Bikhrati Chali Aayee Ho' both by Mohammed Rafi were very popular.

== Cast ==
- Ashok Kumar as Choudhary Sahib
- Joy Mukherjee as Dr. Dilip
- Meera Joglekar as Meena
- Lalita Pawar as Mrs. Bala
- Malika as Putli
- Nirupa Roy as Hostel Principal
- Mehmood as Munna
- Om Prakash as Lala
- Nana Palsikar as Ram Ratan

== Soundtrack ==
| Song | Singer |
|---|---|
| "Pyar Kya Hota Hai" | Lata Mangeshkar |
| "Na Tum Bewafa Ho" | Lata Mangeshkar |
| "Main To Pee Ki Nagariya" | Lata Mangeshkar |
| "Meri Junglee Kabootar" | Mohammed Rafi |
| "Zulf Bikhrati Chali Aayi Ho" | Mohammed Rafi |
| "Lo Ek Kali Muskayi" (Happy) | Mohammed Rafi |
| "Lo Ek Kali Muskayi" (Sad) | Mohammed Rafi |
