= Gateway of India =

Landmark monument in Mumbai, India

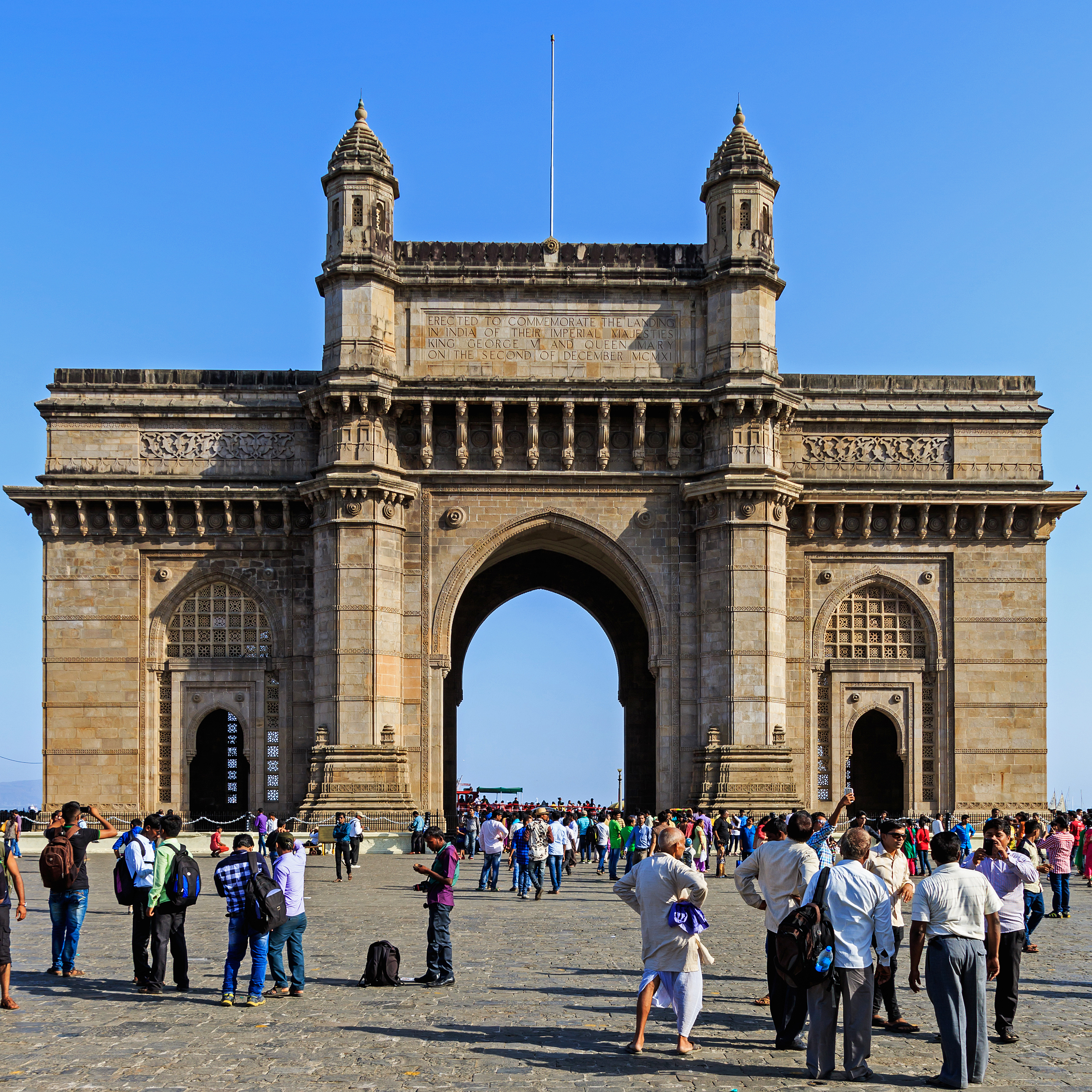
- The Gateway of India

- Location within Mumbai Location within Maharashtra Location within India

General information
- Type: Triumphal arch
- Architectural style: Indo-Saracenic
- Location: Mumbai, Maharashtra, India
- Coordinates: 18.9219826300°N 72.8346581125°E
- Construction started: 31 March 1913; 113 years ago
- Completed: 1924; 102 years ago
- Inaugurated: 4 December 1924
- Cost: ₹21.13 lakhs
- Owner: Archaeological Survey of India

Height
- Height: 26 m (85 ft)

Dimensions
- Diameter: 15 metres (49 feet)

Design and construction
- Architect: George Wittet
- Architecture firm: Gammon India

Renovating team
- Architect: George Wittet

Website
- gatewayofindia.org

The Gateway of India is an arch-monument, completed in 1924, on the waterfront of Mumbai, Maharashtra, India. It was erected to commemorate the landing of King George V of the United Kingdom for his coronation as the Emperor of India in December 1911 at Strand Road near Wellington Fountain. He was the first British monarch to visit India.

The foundation stone was laid in March 1913 for a monument built in the Indo-Saracenic style, inspired by elements of 16th-century Gujarati architecture. The final design of the monument by architect George Wittet was sanctioned only in 1914, and construction was completed in 1924. The structure is a memorial arch made of basalt, which is 26 metres (85 feet) high, with an architectural resemblance to a triumphial arch as well as Gujarati architecture of the time. (Note: Bandyopadhyay et al. (2008) write, "The Indian government's efforts in this portrayal of the Hindu heritage is nowhere more prominent than the mention of the Gateway of India architecture in Mumbai...it was stressed that though the British rulers designed the Gateway, it was according to the Gujarat style.")

After its construction, the Gateway was used as a symbolic ceremonial entrance to India for important government personnel. The Gateway is also the monument from where the last British troops left in 1948, following Indian independence a year earlier. It is located on the waterfront at an angle, opposite the Taj Mahal Palace and Tower Hotel and overlooks the Arabian Sea. Today, the monument is synonymous with the city of Mumbai, and is among its prime tourist attractions. The Gateway is also a gathering spot for locals, street vendors, and photographers soliciting services. It holds significance for the local Jewish community as it has been the spot for Hanukkah celebrations, with the lighting of the menorah, since 2003. There are five jetties located at the Gateway, of which two are used for commercial ferry operations.

The Gateway was the site of a terror attack in August 2003, when there was a bomb blast in a taxi parked in front of it. Access to the gateway was restricted after people congregated at its premises following the 2008 Mumbai terrorist attacks, in which the Taj Mahal palace Hotel that was opposite the gateway and other locations in its vicinity were targeted.

In March 2019, the Maharashtra State Government proposed a four-step plan to develop the location for the convenience of tourists, following a direction issued by the State Governor in February 2019.

== History and significance ==
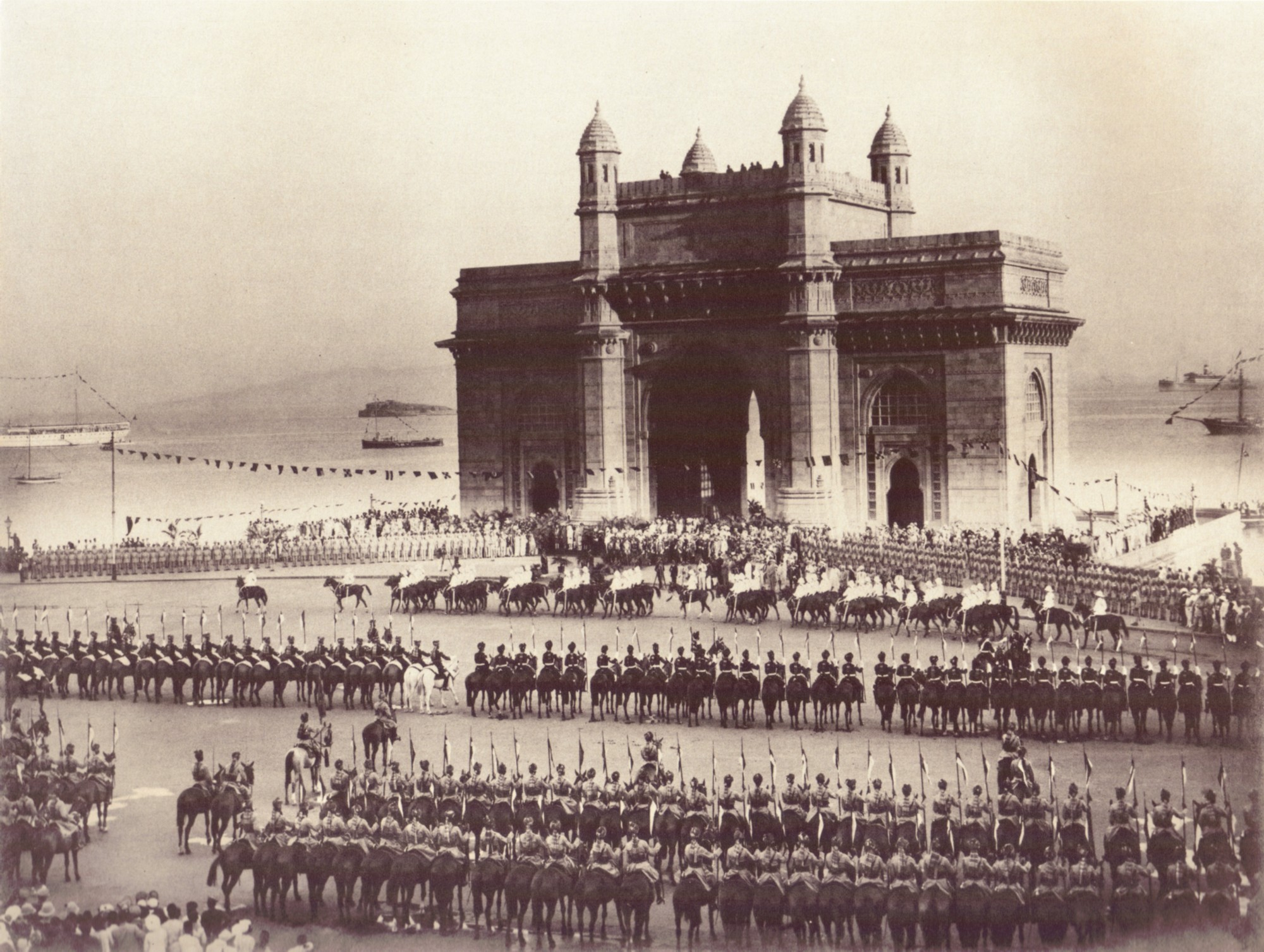
The Gateway, in 1924

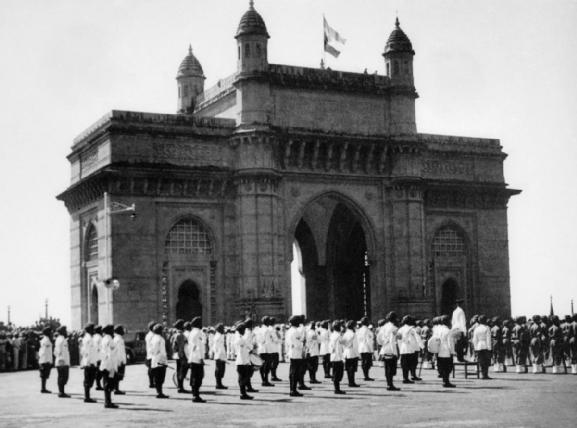
Departure of the last British troops from the Gateway, in 1948

The Gateway of India was built to commemorate the arrival of King George V of the United Kingdom, Emperor of India, and Mary of Teck, Empress Consort, in India at Apollo Bunder, Mumbai, on 2 December 1911 prior to the Delhi Durbar of 1921. It was the first visit of a British monarch to India. However, they only got to see a cardboard model of the monument, (Note: While Dupée (2008) notes that the king and queen passed through a "temporarily constructed mock cardboard and pastiche structure", de Bruyn et al. (2008) note the same simply as a "fake cardboard structure".) as construction did not begin until 1915.

The foundation stone for the Gateway was laid on 31 March 1913 by then Governor of Bombay, Sir George Sydenham Clarke, with the final design of George Wittet for the Gateway sanctioned in August 1914. Before the Gateway's construction, Apollo Bunder used to serve as a native fishing ground. Between 1915 and 1919, work continued at the Apollo Bunder to reclaim the land on which the Gateway was to be built, along with the construction of a sea wall. Gammon India had undertaken construction work for the gateway. (Note: Gammon India claims to have done India's first pre-cast reinforced concrete piling for the foundations of the Gateway.)

Its foundations were completed in 1920 while construction was finished in 1924. The Gateway was opened to the public on 4 December 1924, by the then Viceroy, Rufus Isaacs, 1st Marquess of Reading. Following Indian independence, the last British troops to leave India, the First Battalion of the Somerset Light Infantry, passed through the Gateway with a 21-gun salute, as part of a ceremony on 28 February 1948, signalling the end of the British Raj. (Note: Morris (2005) writes about the gateway, "This was where the British landed: and this where, in the end, they left. The Gateway of India did not see many ceremonial arrivals after all, during its three decades under British rule, but it formed the background to one historical departure — the last parade with which, in 1947, the British said goodbye to their Indian Empire.")

N. Kamala, professor at Jawaharlal Nehru University, refers to the Gateway as a "jewel in the crown" and a "symbol of conquest and colonisation" which signifies the Indian nation's emergence through British colonisation, looking both outward to the imperial traveller and inward to the Indian populace. (Note: Kamala (2000) writes, "Through the Gateway, the imperial traveller could perceive in his mind's eye the vision of a subject-nation, a nation constructed and processed in and for his gaze. As Tejaswini Niranjana points out, one of the professed aims of English education was to give the colonized, "along with the English language, models of national culture" (1992, 107), the stated objectives being to "give a liberal English education to the middle and upper classes, in order that we may furnish them with both the materials and models for the formation of a national literature" (Trevelyan 1838, 175). While various notions of India—indeed, various Indias—may have pre-existed British colonization, this one monolithic nation, India, was constructed only in English translation. The Gateway of India looked outward, welcoming the colonizer, a symbol and facilitator of appropriation, but it also looked inward, bringing a people together (and driving them apart) as they dutifully defined their nation in the curiously perceived neutrality of the English language.") The monument commemorates the legacy of British colonial rule, namely the first visit of a British monarch to India and its use as an entry point for prominent colonial personnel into British India. Today the Gateway is synonymous with the city of Mumbai. (Note: The gateway has also been featured in films shot in or with stories based in Mumbai. Ranjani Mazumdar (2010), referring to the 1989 Indian film Parinda, writes, "In a city where the rich and poor live cheek by jowl, where disenchantment is the experience of the majority, Mumbai Noir has become synonymous with urban decay, crime, claustrophobia, and an assortment of characters marked by some sort of death wish...Karan is soon sucked into a vortex of violence in a narrative that consciously uses Mumbai's familiar locations like the Gateway of India, the Babulnath Temple, the fountains and various abandoned factories...Urban space is not just the backdrop but a central character in the film and the use of the Gateway of India to stage a bloody climax paved the way for a new imagination of violence." There is also a 1957 Indian film titled Gateway of India featuring the monument, starring Madhubala and Om Prakash.) Since its construction, the gateway has remained amongst the first structures visible to visitors arriving in Bombay by the sea. (Note: Tindall (1992) writes, "If Bombay is, as some think, an Indian city with a Western façade, then the Gateway and the Taj (Note: Referring to the Taj Mahal Palace Hotel located opposite the gateway, both visible together from the sea.) are this façade in spite of their determinedly oriental opulence." While Dupée (2008) writes, "The city's dramatical imperial arch graced the harbor's approach, lending substance to the characterization that Bombay was the "gateway" or "front door" to the subcontinent, not unlike, according to one author, the Arc de Triomphe's as entryway into the city of Paris...The arch of honey-colored basalt was not completed until 1924, but once erected it became for travellers the city's dominant architectural icon. The Taj Mahal Hotel, situated nearby, also faced the harbour, commanding a stunning view of the sea and, dependent upon the traveller's aesthetic tastes, lending an imposing grandeur to the city's image." Yet Monojit (1997) notes, "Visible from way out at sea, it was the first sight of normality in what was to be an alien land...Today, the Gateway is a favourite promenade spot for thousands of Bomabyites...the Gateway that once symbolised Imperial rule still symbolises the city's closeness to the West, its contact with the outside world.")

Since 2003, the Gateway has been the location for the local Jewish community to light the menorah for Hanukkah celebrations every year. This ritual was started by Rabbi Gavriel Noach Holtzberg of the chabad in Mumbai (located in Nariman House). It also became a site for prayers following the 2008 Mumbai terrorist attacks which was targeted, amongst others, Nariman House. Rabbi Holtzberg lost his life in the 2008 terrorist attacks.

== Design and architecture ==
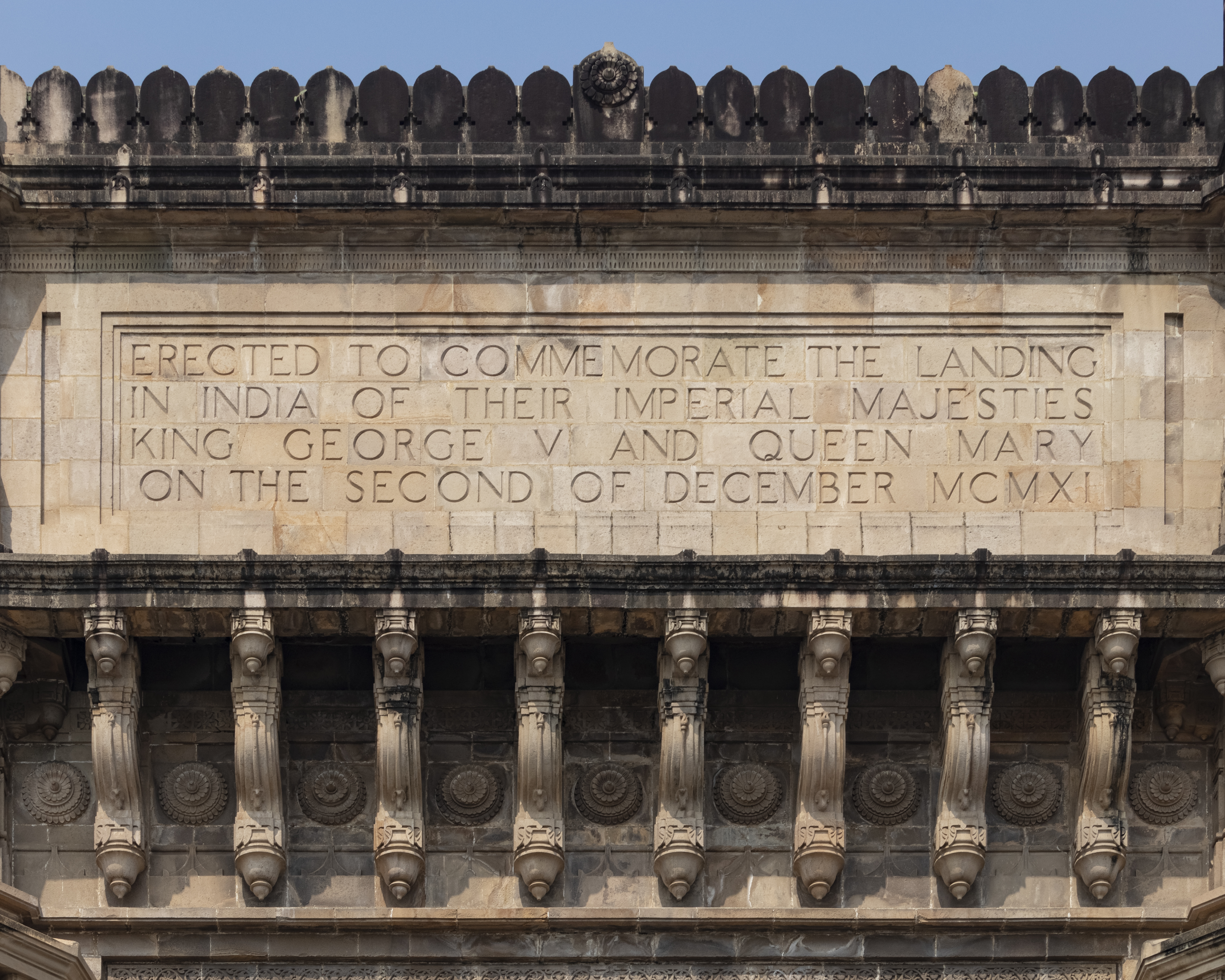
Inscription on the Gateway reading: "Erected to commemorate the landing in India of their Imperial Majesties King George V and Queen Mary on the Second of December MCMXI"

The structure, in yellow basalt and concrete, is rectangular, with two long sides and two much shorter ones. Three arched passageways run between the long sides, as well as a single arched passageway between the two shorter sides. The central arch is higher and wider, with an extra storey above, from which four turrets rise. The arches on the short sides are the same size and design as the smaller arches on the long sides. The style of the Gateway of India is Indo-Saracenic architecture, with many details taken from the Gujarati regional style. The façade is reminiscent of Gujarati mosque façades, for example the Jama Mosque, Ahmedabad of 1424, while the basic shape is, in the terminology of classical architecture, an octopylon with a floor plan of eight piers, as used in some triumphal arches and memorials, including the Arc de Triomphe du Carrousel in Paris. The exterior features restrained but intricate bands of ornament, and jali screens around the smaller arches.

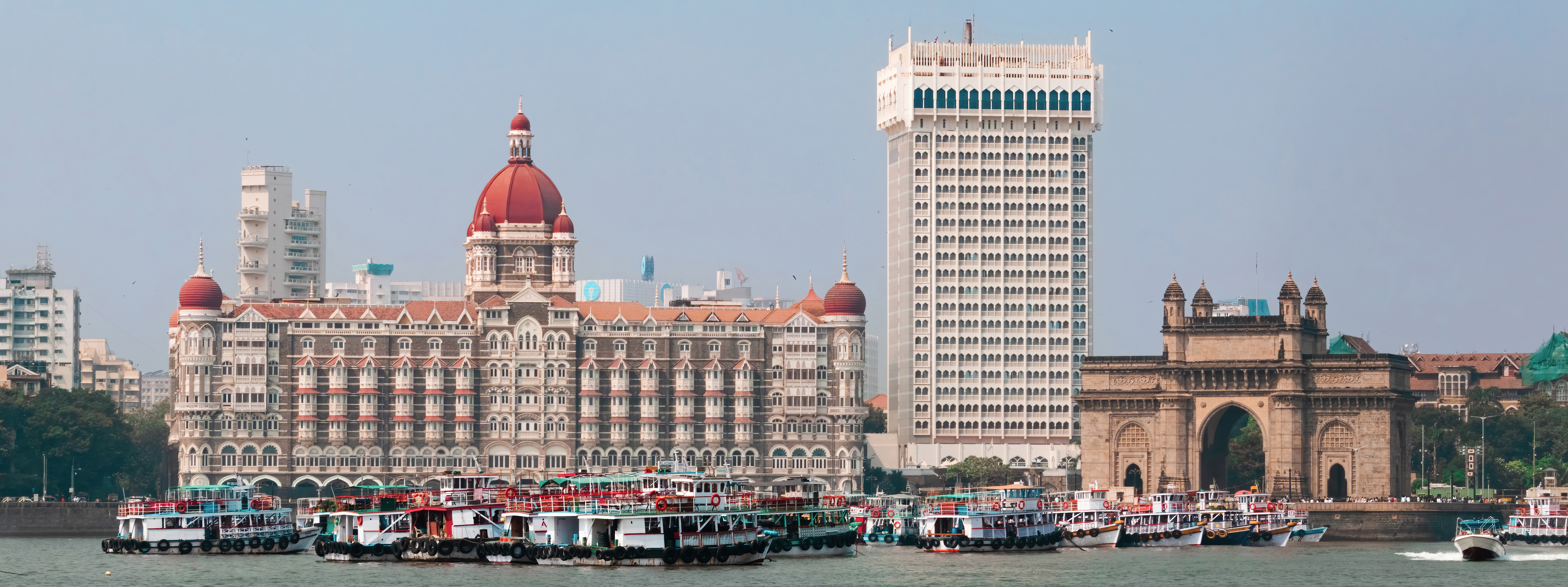
The sea-facing side

The Gateway's arch has a height of 26 metres (85 feet) with its central dome being 15 metres (49 feet) in diameter. The monument is built of yellow basalt and reinforced concrete. The stones were sourced locally while the perforated screens were brought in from Gwalior. The monument faces towards the Mumbai Harbour. There are four turrets on the structure of the gateway, and there are steps constructed behind the arch of the Gateway which lead to the Arabian Sea. The monument features intricate stone latticework (also known as the jali work). The Scottish architect, George Wittet combined indigenous architectural elements with elements of 16th-century architecture of Gujarat. (Note: Bandyopadhyay et al. (2008) write, "The Indian government's efforts in this portrayal of the Hindu heritage is nowhere more prominent than the mention of the Gateway of India architecture in Mumbai...it was stressed that though the British rulers designed the Gateway, it was according to the Gujarat style.") The harbour front was realigned in order to make an esplanade, which would sweep down to the centre of the town. On each side of the arch, there are large halls with the capacity to hold 600 people. The cost of the construction was ₹21 lakh (US$22,000), borne by the then government. Due to a paucity of funds, the approach road was never built. Hence, the Gateway stands at an angle to the road leading up to it.

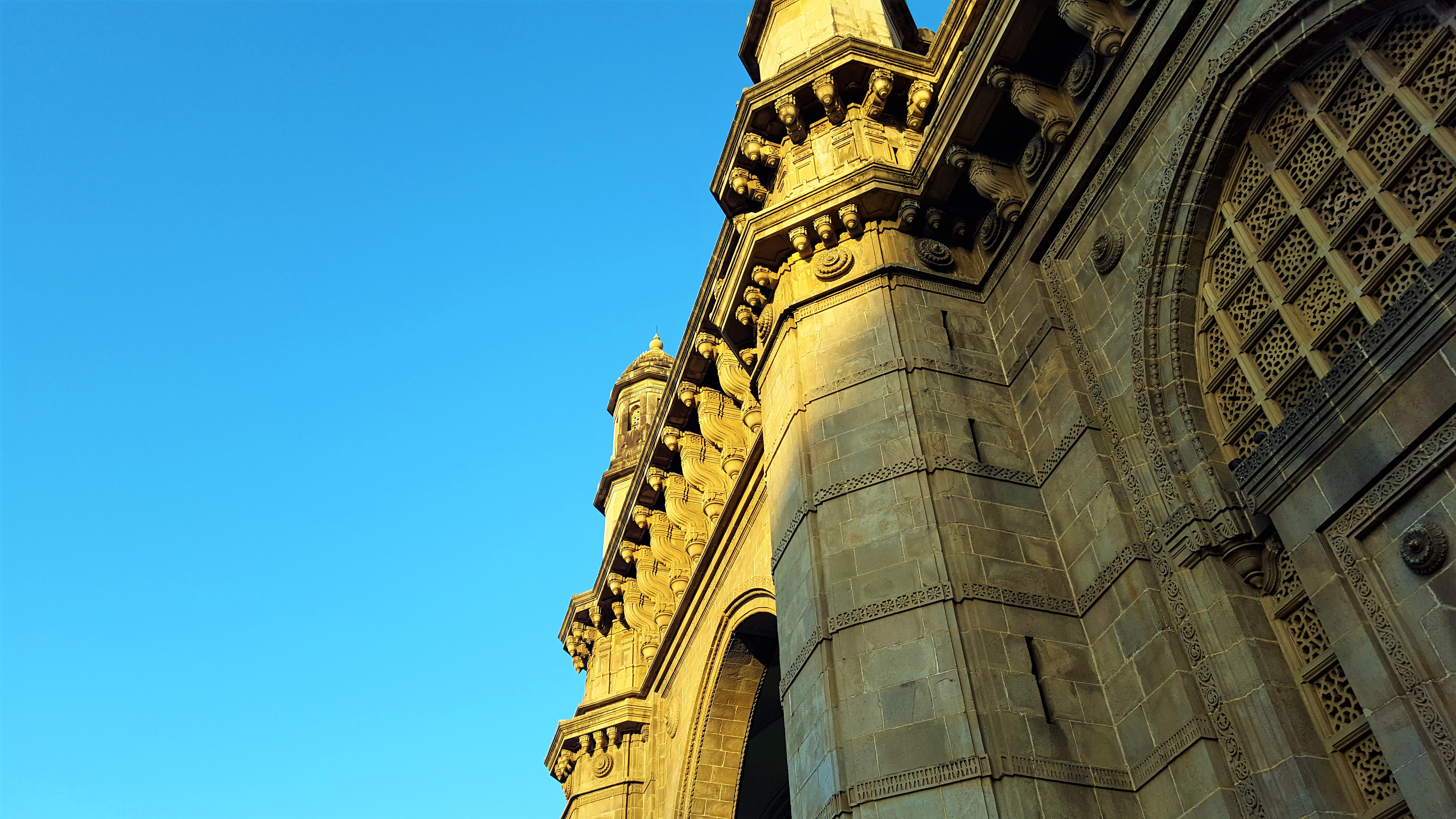
Side view

In February 2019, Seagate Technology and CyArk embarked on a mission to digitally record and preserve the Gateway, by digital scanning and archiving of the monument. The images and data collected will be used to make photo-real three dimensional models. This is a part of CyArk's international programme for digitally preserving heritage monuments. It involves aerial surveys conducted with terrestrial laser scanning (LiDAR), drones, and photogrammetry exercises. The drawings and three-dimensional models will inform any future reconstruction works.

== Location and jetties ==
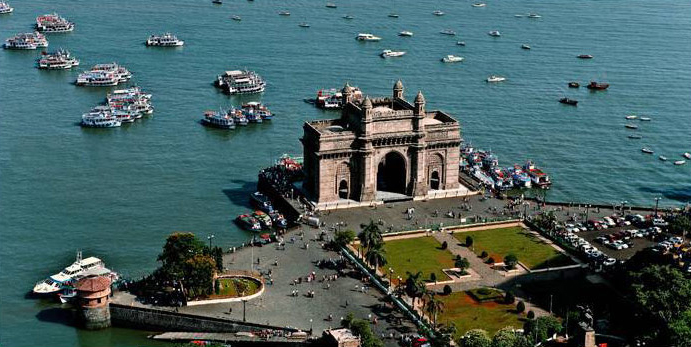
Aerial view in 2014, with the gardens before reduction

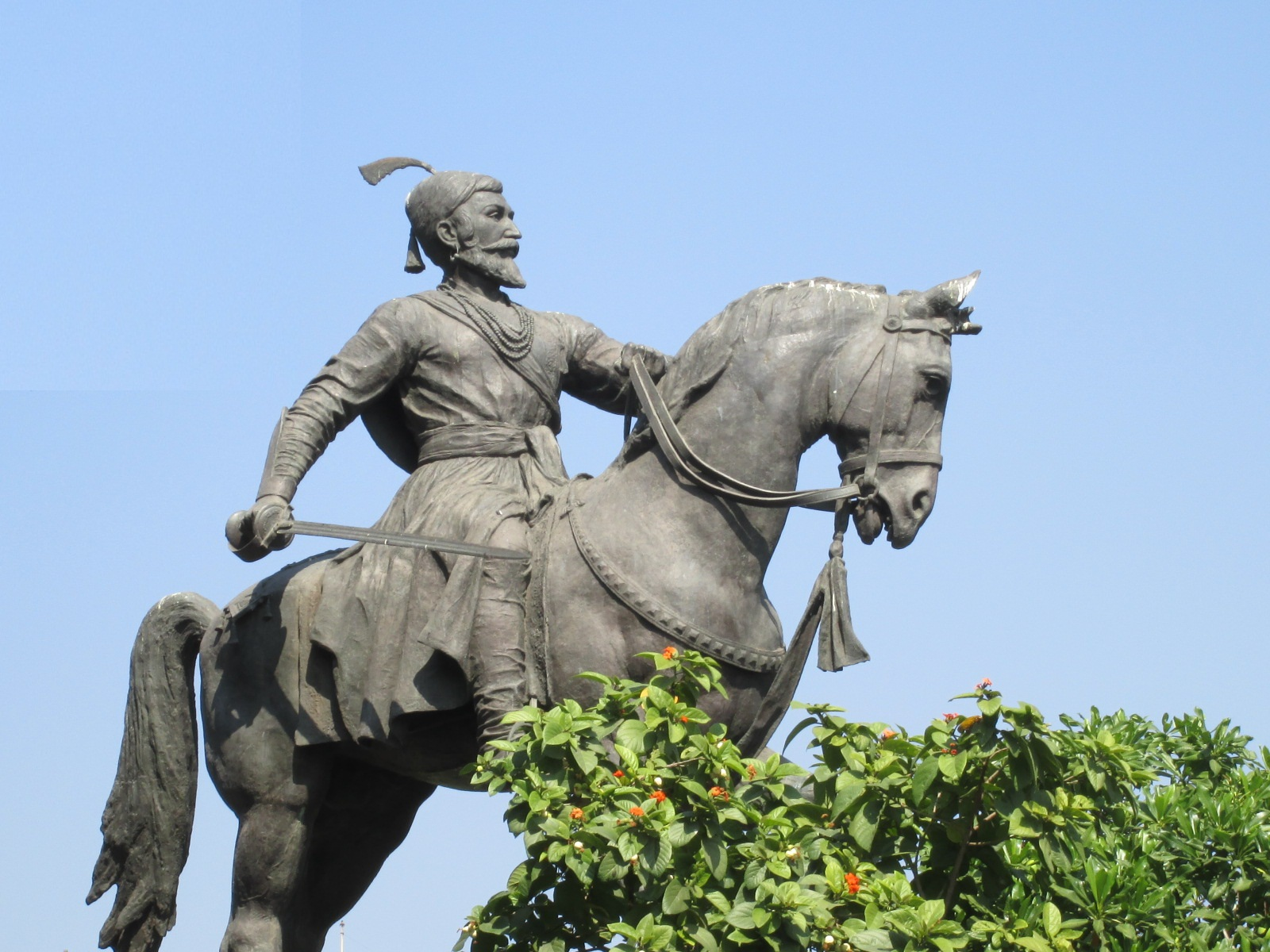
Statue of Chattrapati Shivaji Maharaj, in the vicinity of the Gateway

The Gateway stands at an angle, opposite to the Taj Mahal Palace and Tower Hotel, which was built in 1903. In the grounds of the gateway, opposite the monument, stands the statue of Shivaji, the Maratha warrior-hero who fought against the Mughal Empire to establish the Maratha Empire in the 17th century. The statue was unveiled on 26 January 1961 on the occasion of India's Republic Day. It replaced a bronze statue of King-Emperor George V which stood at its place. (Note: McGarr (2015) writes, "In July 1959, in Bombay, moves were set in train to replace a statue of George V, which stood next to the Gateway of India on the city's waterfront, with a figure of Chhatrapati Shivaji Maharaj, a renowned Maratha warrior. As one of the best-known royal statues in India, the decision elicited strong feelings among those on both sides of the statues debate. One British expatriate living in Bombay, wrote to the editor of The Times of India to decry 'the limits [to] which petty-mindedness and nationalistic feeling can be carried'. Back in London, William Haley, editor of The Times, echoed such sentiment...Haley wrote to a friend, 'this business of removing statues is really rather nonsense. Rather like un-writing history in George Orwell's 1984. What is done is done and there is no reason for the Indians to be ashamed of it...When will man-kind grow up?' Official Indian sentiment, however, had begun to turn decisively against the retention of British statues in public locations. In September 1961, in Maharashtra (a new state carved from the former Bombay Presidency along linguistic lines) a committee established to look into the retention of British monuments reported that none of the state's British statues could be regarded as offensive to Indian nationalism, and extremely few had been defaced. Nonetheless, the committee recommended the progressive replacement of British iconography with that 'more in consonance with the sense of patriotism and nationalism which has developed since the attainment of Independence in 1947'...In Calcutta, municipal authorities announced that statues of Lord Lawrence and Queen Victoria, which stood in prominent positions in the heart of the city, would be replaced by figures of the Indian nationalist icons...Only in New Delhi, it seemed, was a nationwide trend towards the removal of British statuary. The continued presence of British iconography in India's capital was shortly, however, to become a matter of contentious political debate.") In 2016, Mid-Day reported that the George V statue is kept locked in a tin shed belonging to the Public Works Department, behind Elphinstone College, in Fort, Mumbai. The George V statue was sculpted by G. K. Mhatre, who has over 300 sculptures to his credit in India. Sandeep Dahisarkar, a historian, researcher, and academician, have made efforts to relocate the George V statue to a museum, the latter of whom has reasserted the statue as swadeshi art.

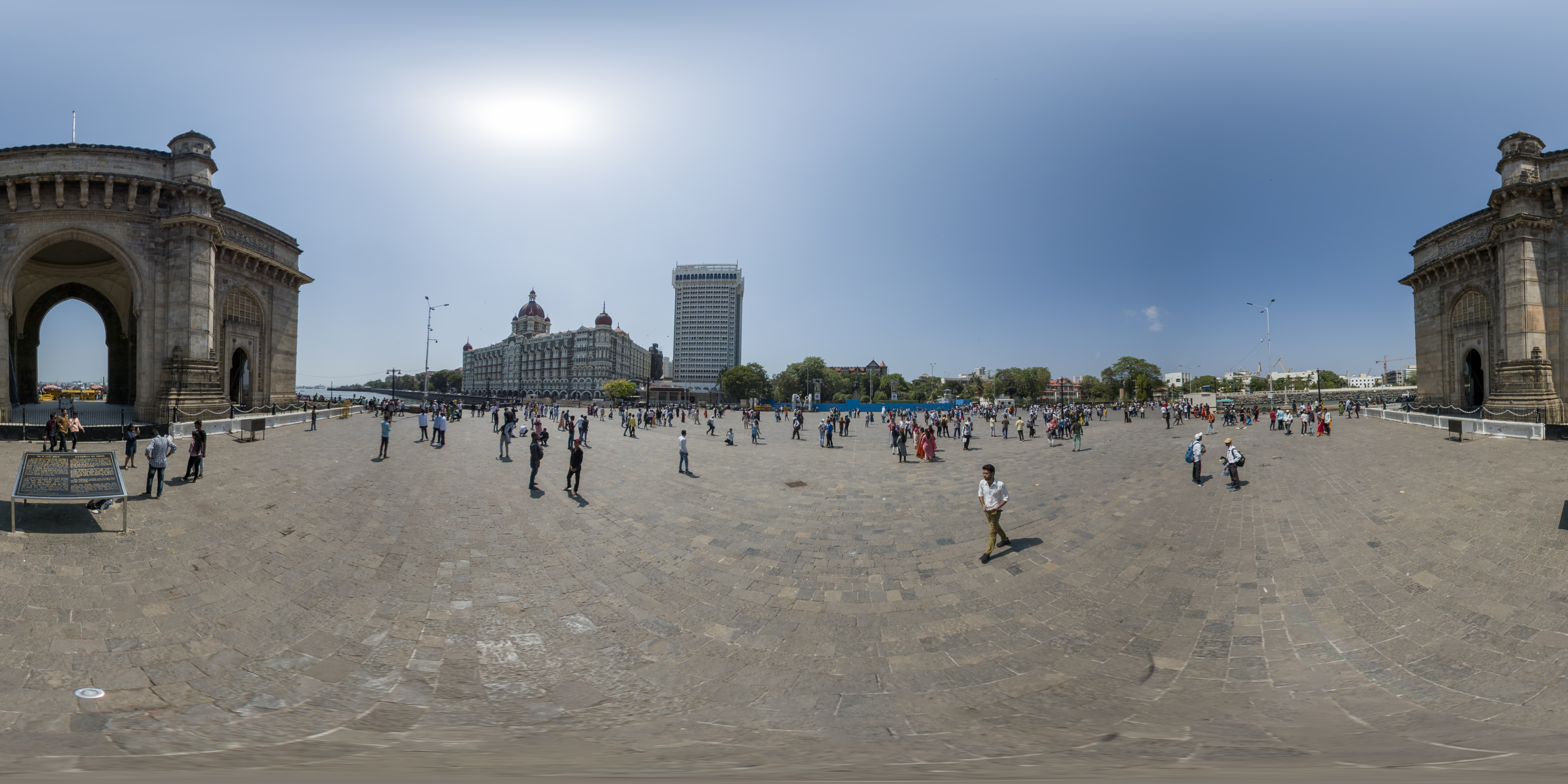
View of Gateway of India from the plaza. (view as a 360° interactive panorama)

The other statue in the locality of the gateway is that of Swami Vivekananda, an Indian monk who is credited as a key figure in the introduction of Indian philosophies such as Vedanta and Yoga to the west, and with bringing Hinduism to the status of a major world religion during the late 19th century. (Note: Bandyopadhyay et al. (2008), referring to the renaming of colonial names of cities and locations, write, "...although the Gateway is associated with colonial heritage, which the Indian government also embraces, it wants to make a point that the Hindus were not short of renowned leaders/personalities (here in the case of two statues, Swami Vivekananda who is arguably India's greatest spiritual celebrity, and Chhatrapati Shivaji Maharaj who was arguably one of the country's most respected Hindu rulers). This resistance, it can be argued is targeted in opposition to the Western colonial influence which...is a "psychological state resulting from suppressed feelings of envy and hatred." In 2017, Bharatiya Janata Party member Raj K. Purohit, who has held six terms in the Maharashtra Legislative Assembly, demanded the gateway to be renamed "Bharat Dwaar" (the Hindi translation of "the gateway of India") to ensure an "Indian name" for the monument and to let go of India's "colonial hangover". He further claimed the monument to be a "symbol of slavery".)

There are five jetties located around the monument. The first jetty is exclusive to the Bhabha Atomic Research Centre, while the second and third are used for commercial ferry operations, the fourth one is closed, and the fifth is exclusive to the Royal Bombay Yacht Club. The second and third jetties are the starting point for tourists to reach the Elephanta Caves, which are fifty minutes away by boat from the monument. Other routes from the gateway include ferry rides to Rewas, Mandwa, and Alibaug, while cruises also operate from the gateway. These ferries reportedly carry an overload of daily passengers. The Mumbai Port Trust licenses vessels to use the gateway while the Maharashtra Maritime Board issues fitness certificates to them.

== Tourism and development ==
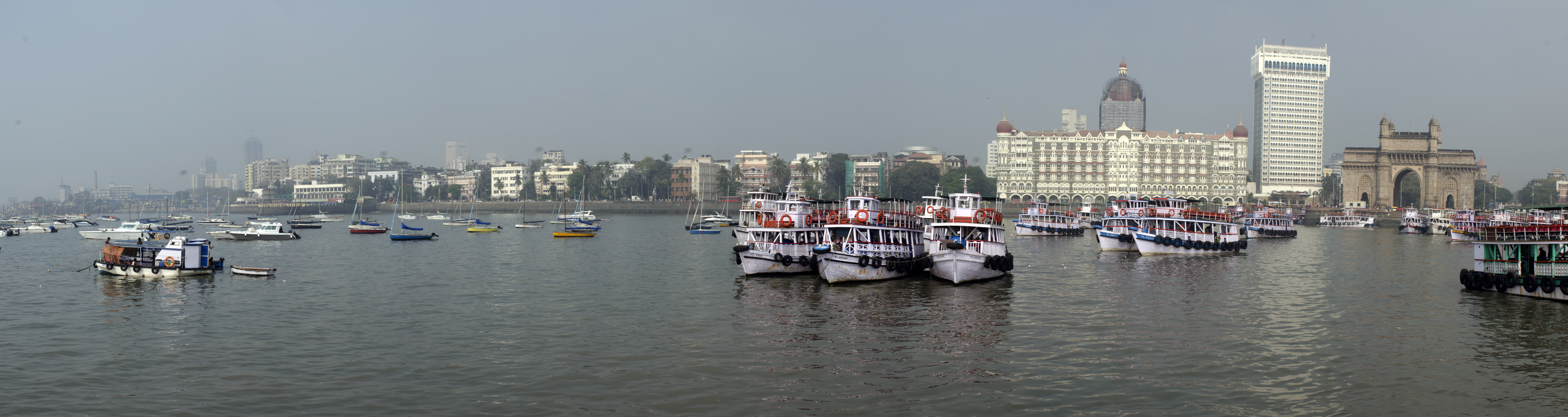
Gateway of India. Taj Mahal Hotel and Mumbai skyline from Elephanta Island ferry

The Gateway is amongst the prime tourist attractions in Mumbai. The Gateway is a protected monument in Maharashtra under the aegis of the Archaeological Survey of India (ASI). It is a regular gathering place for locals, street vendors, and photographers. (Note: Morris (2005) writes, "Today the Gateway of India has forgotten all its pompous or elegiac meanings and is a place of pleasure, habitually thronged, inside and out, by companionable crowds out for the sea air. The liners no longer come from Londond, and the only boats around the pier are pleasure crafts touting trips around the harbour, or excursions to the Elephanta Caves. It is a merry place, an ice-cream place...".) In 2012, the Maharashtra Tourism Development Corporation moved the Elephanta Festival of Music and Dance from its original location at Elephanta Caves — where it had been celebrated for 23 years — to the Gateway, due to the increased capacity offered by the venue. The Gateway can host 2,000 to 2,500 people, whereas Elephanta Caves could host only 700 to 800.

By 2012, the Brihanmumbai Municipal Corporation increased the plaza area around the Gateway for pedestrians by restoring the area at a cost of ₹5 crores. It involved the cutting down of trees, reducing the garden area, replacing toilets, and closing the car park. The redevelopment led to a dispute between the Indian National Trust for Art and Cultural Heritage (INTACH) and the Urban Design Research Institute, and the government was criticised for poor project implementation which critics alleged had failed to conform to the original plans.

In January 2014, Philips Lighting India, in association with the Maharashtra Tourism Development Corporation, undertook the expenditure of ₹2 crores to illuminate the gateway, by installing an LED lighting system with sixteen million shades. Philips used products from its Philips Color Kinetics and LED street lighting, and did not receive any branding for the illumination project in which 132 light points were created, which were reportedly sixty-percent more energy efficient than the old lighting system. In August 2014, the state Directorate of Archaeology and Museums had proposed conservation of the Gateway by the ASI, after noting deterioration caused by saline deposits from the sea. An estimate of costs was to be prepared and approved by the ASI. The last such conservation had been undertaken twenty years earlier. An independent study had earlier been conducted at the Gateway, between June 2001 and May 2002, aimed at informing future conservation of the monument understanding the degree of colour changes of stones owing to seasonal weather conditions and saturated colour of minerals. The study found the stones of the monument to appear darker during monsoon than during other seasons while the colour change in the inner portions of the monument rises with variations of seasonal humidity and temperature, given they do not face the sea, rainwater, or sunlight. It concluded with the finding that the alteration degree and overall colour change in the inner portions are higher than those in the outer portions of the monument.

In 2015, the Maharashtra Maritime Board and the Maharashtra Coastal Zone Management Authority approved a proposal to construct a passenger jetty near Apollo Bunder and a promenade between the Gateway and the Bombay Presidency Radio Club. The project was aimed at reducing crowding at the Gateway by closing all its jetties and refocusing the location solely as a tourist attraction.

The Gateway has interested companies and corporate houses such as the Tata Group, the RPG Group, and the JSW Group, who have expressed their wish to maintain the Gateway and enhance its facilities. This happened after the state government identified 371 heritage sites under its Maharashtra Vaibhav State Protected Monuments Adoption Scheme (MVSPMAS). Under this scheme, companies and corporates can adopt heritage monuments and give out funds for their maintenance, to satisfy their corporate social responsibility. The scheme also provides sponsors with the opportunity to generate revenue by selling their rights to feature the heritage monuments in commercials and advertisements. Other revenue-generating opportunities include the sale of entry tickets to the site and charging for the use of facilities.

In February 2019, the Maharashtra state government initiated a plan to restore, clean, and beautify the monument. A project plan was to be prepared in a month. The state governor, C. Vidyasagar Rao, directed the Bombay Municipal Corporation commissioner and architects to submit a project plan in a month on measures to be taken for the purpose. In the same month, chemical conservation was proposed by the state archaeology department noting blackening of and algae on stones and surface cracks. Structural stability audit had last been conducted eight years earlier with plant growth on the monument removed annually. In March 2019 the state government agreed on a four-stage plan to manage tourists visiting the site. This involved the physical conservation of the monument, the installation of a sound-and-light show, the relocation of the anchorage around the monument and a streamlined, ticketed entry system. The plan followed UNESCO guidance for protected heritage sites and took into account the views of interested parties, including the Directorate of Museums and Archaeology, which has the monument within its purview; the Mumbai Port Trust, which is entrusted with the land; and the Bombay Municipal Corporation, which controls the location. The task of coming up with a suitable management plan was delegated to architects.

== Events and incidents ==
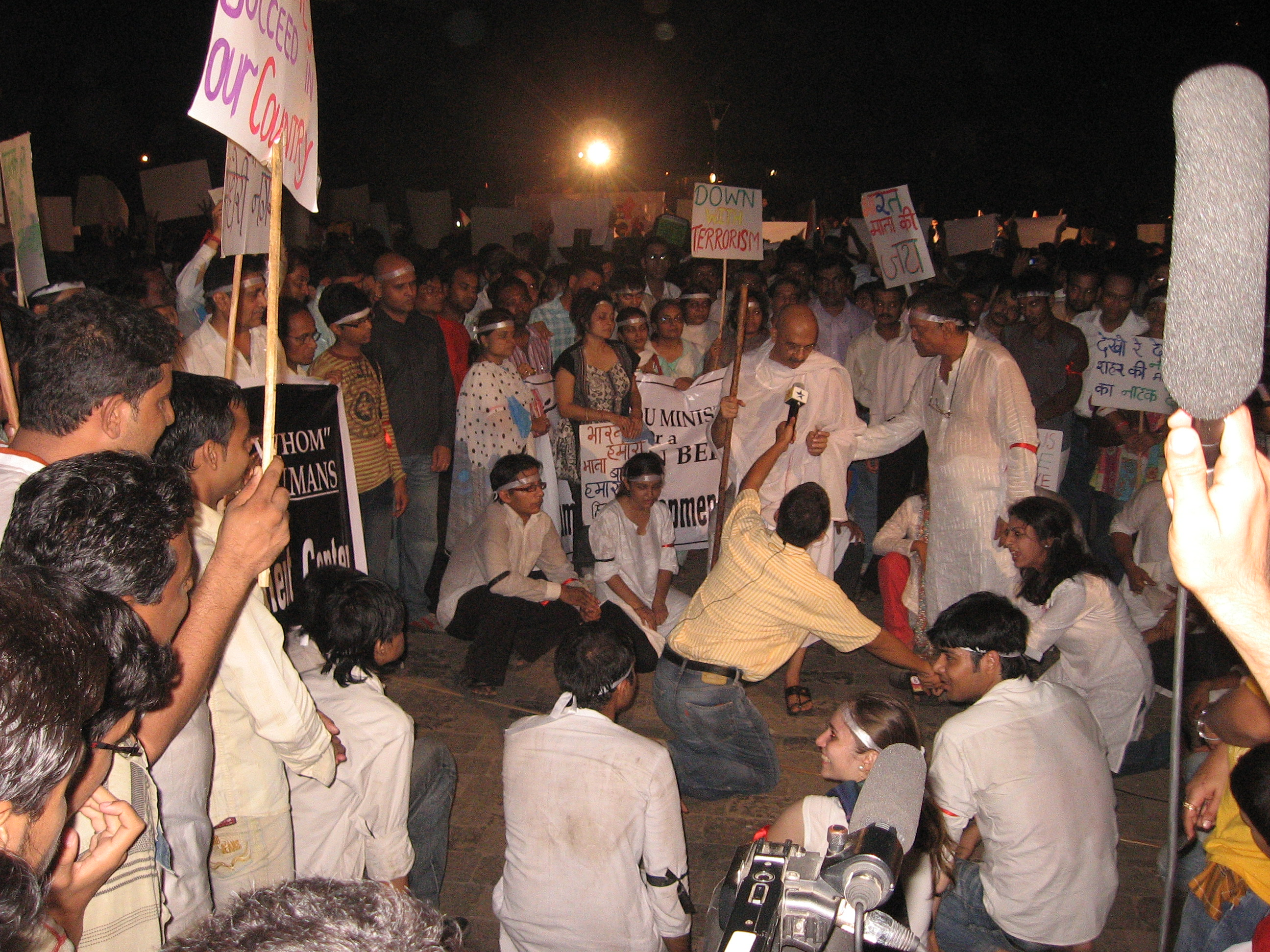
Solidarity march at the Gateway, in the aftermath of the 2008 Mumbai terror attacks

The Gateway was the location of a terror attack on 25 August 2003. The force of the explosion, from a bomb in a taxi parked near the Taj Mahal Hotel, reportedly threw bystanders into the sea. On 13 August 2005, a mentally unstable man stabbed two young girls from Manipur at the gateway premises. On New Year's Eve, 2007 a woman was groped by a mob at the Gateway.

Following the November 2008 Mumbai terror attacks, which targeted the Taj Mahal Palace and Tower Hotel opposite to the Gateway, among other locations, crowds of people including news television reporters and cameramen congregated at the Gateway premises. Subsequently, public access to the area around was restricted. Fearing further attacks on the Gateway and on the Elephanta caves, the state government proposed the closure of all of the jetties at the Gateway and their replacement with two new piers, to be built near the Bombay Presidency Radio Club. In response to the terror attacks, a solidarity march was held at the Gateway premises on 3 December 2008.

In February 2019, protests were organized at the premises in the wake of the Pulwama attack. In January 2020, the Gateway became a site of spontaneous protests that commenced overnight, under the name of "Occupy Gateway", in the aftermath of the attack on Jawaharlal Nehru University, Delhi. Protestors were later relocated from the Gateway premises to Azad Maidan in Mumbai to ease the movement of traffic and people.

== In the media ==
The Mumbai-based video game Mumbai Gullies is expected to feature the Gateway of India in its fictional map.

Several films, such as Bhai-Bhai (1956), Gateway of India (1957), Shararat (1959), Hum Hindustani (1960), Mr. X in Bombay (1964), Sadhu Aur Shaitaan (1968), Aansoo Aur Muskan (1970), Andaz (1971), Chhoti Si Baat (1976) and Don (1978) have been shot at the Gateway of India.

== Gallery ==
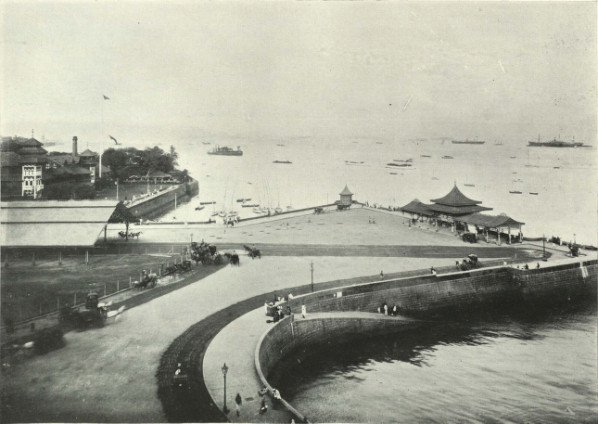
Apollo Bunder in 1905, with the location where the Gateway stands today

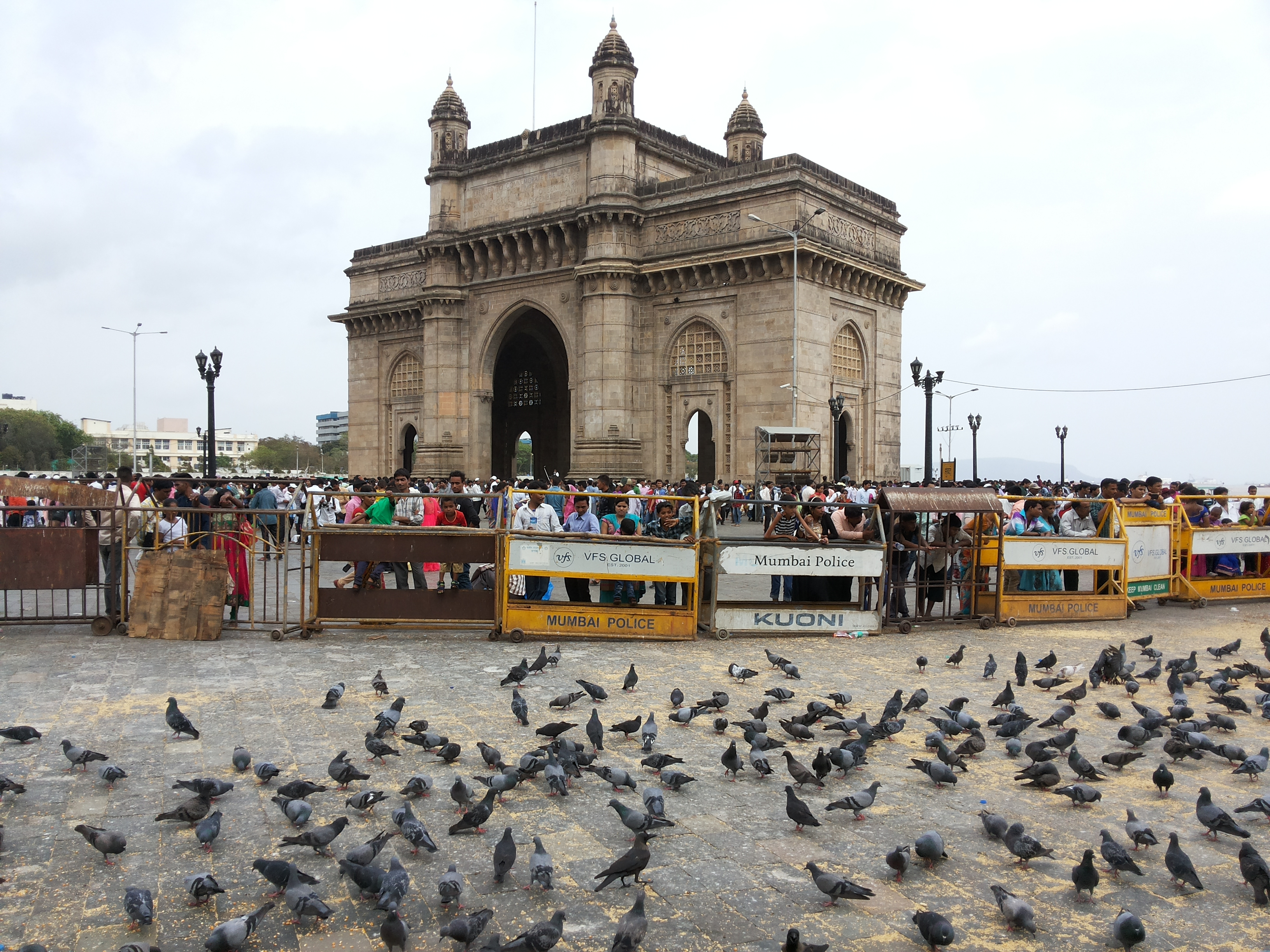
Pigeons on the Gateway grounds

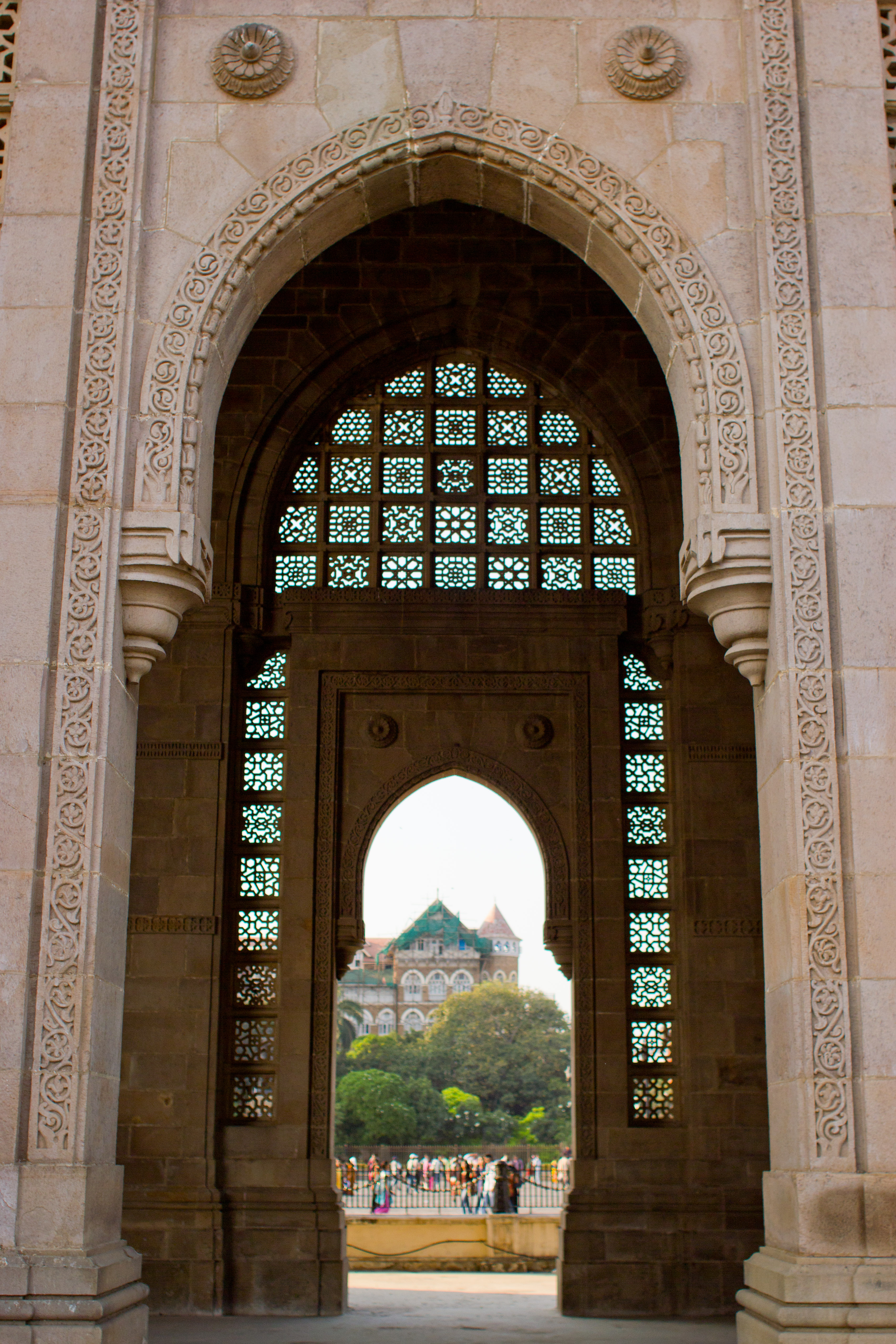
Jali work on the arches

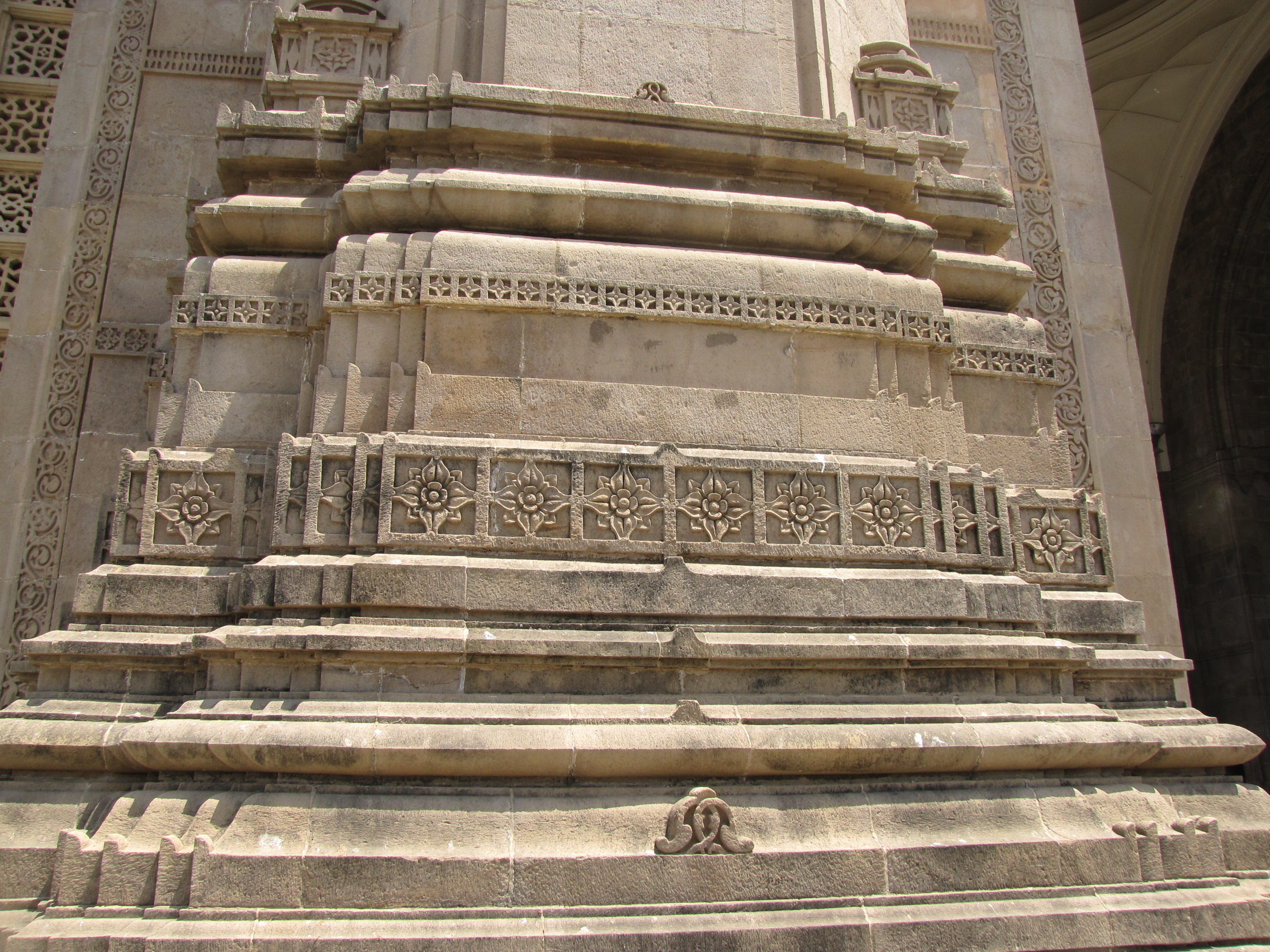
Floral motifs as seen on the Gateway

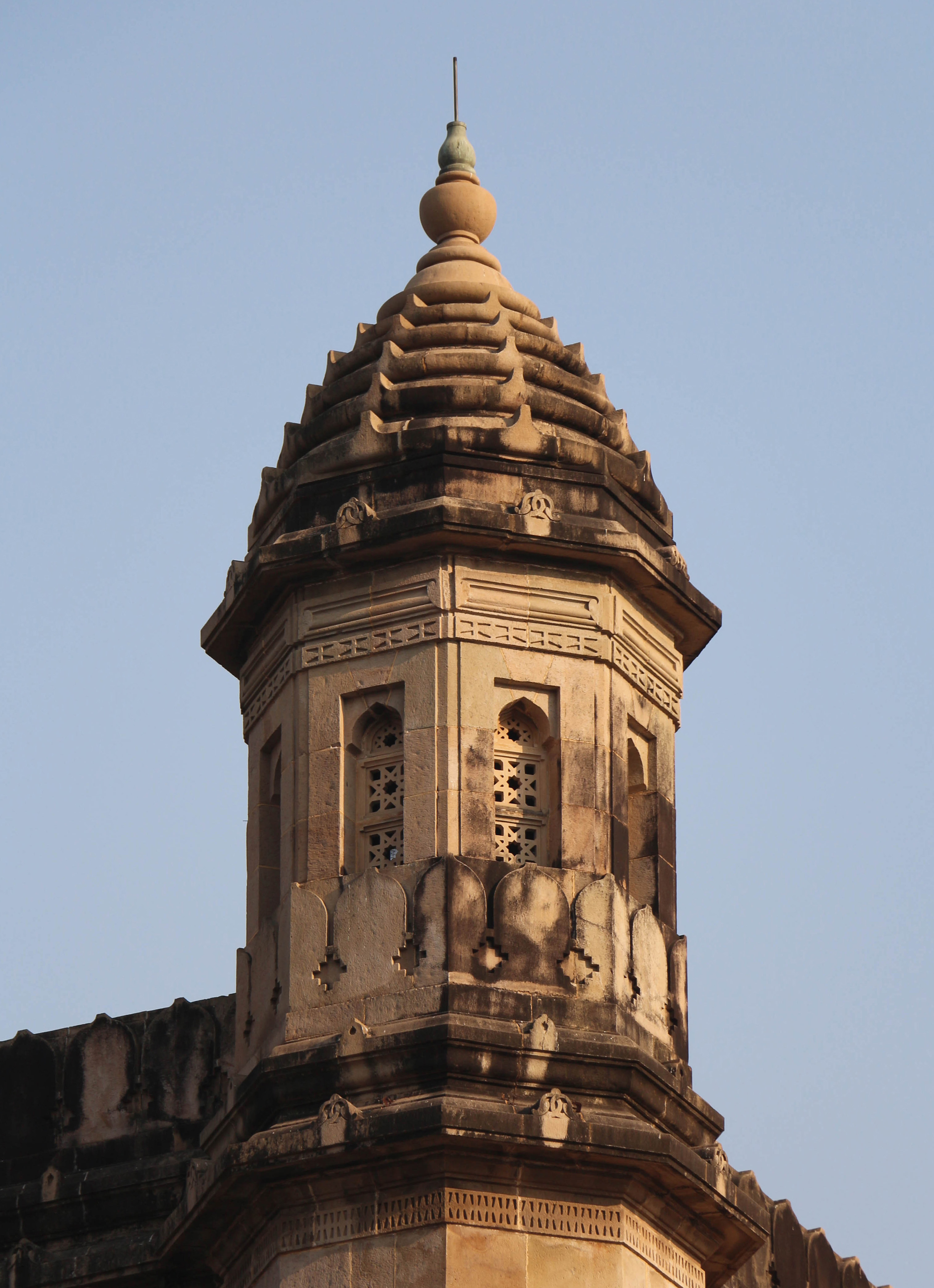
Close-up of a turret

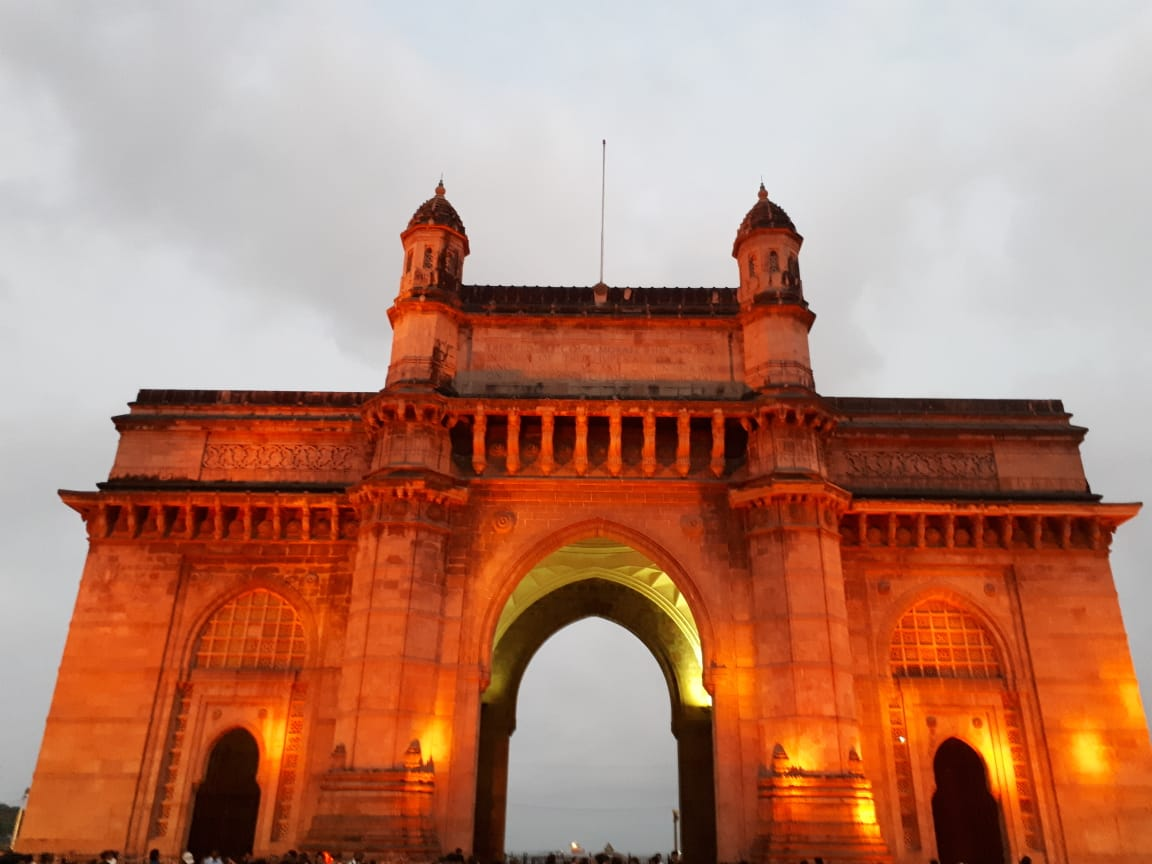
The Gateway lit up in the evening

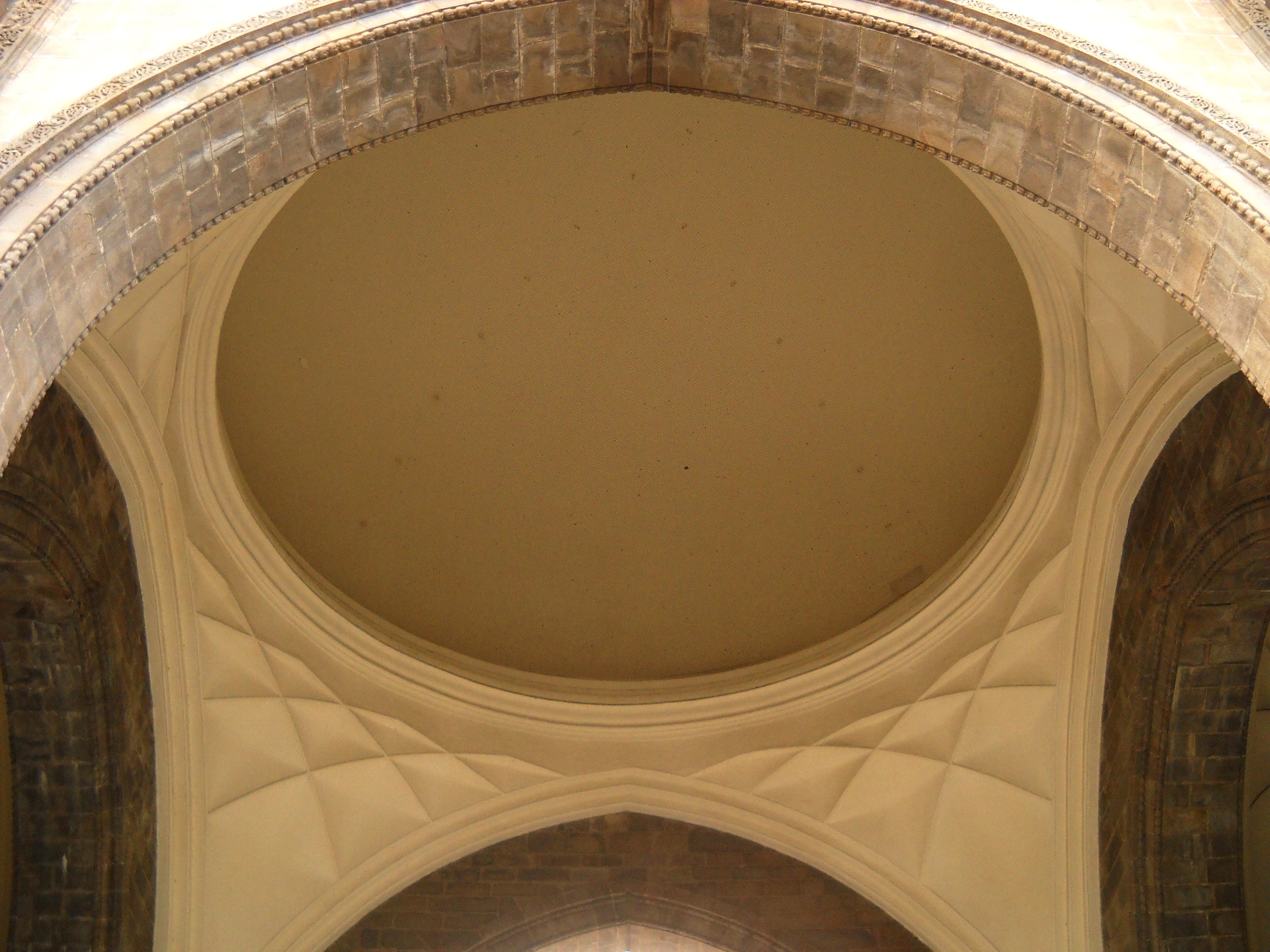
Internal view of the dome with muqarnas designs

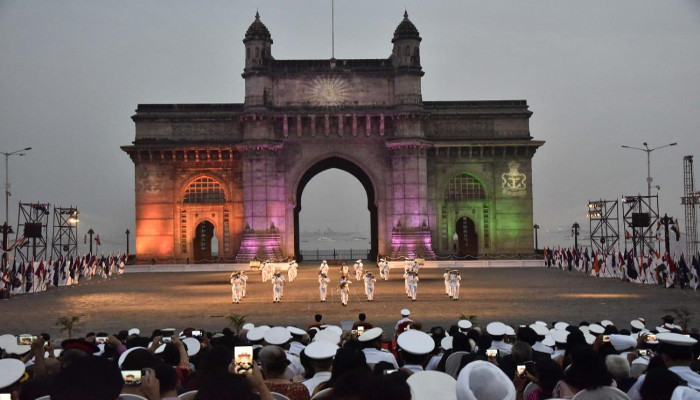
Beating the Retreat and Tattoo Ceremony at the Gateway on Navy Day, 2018

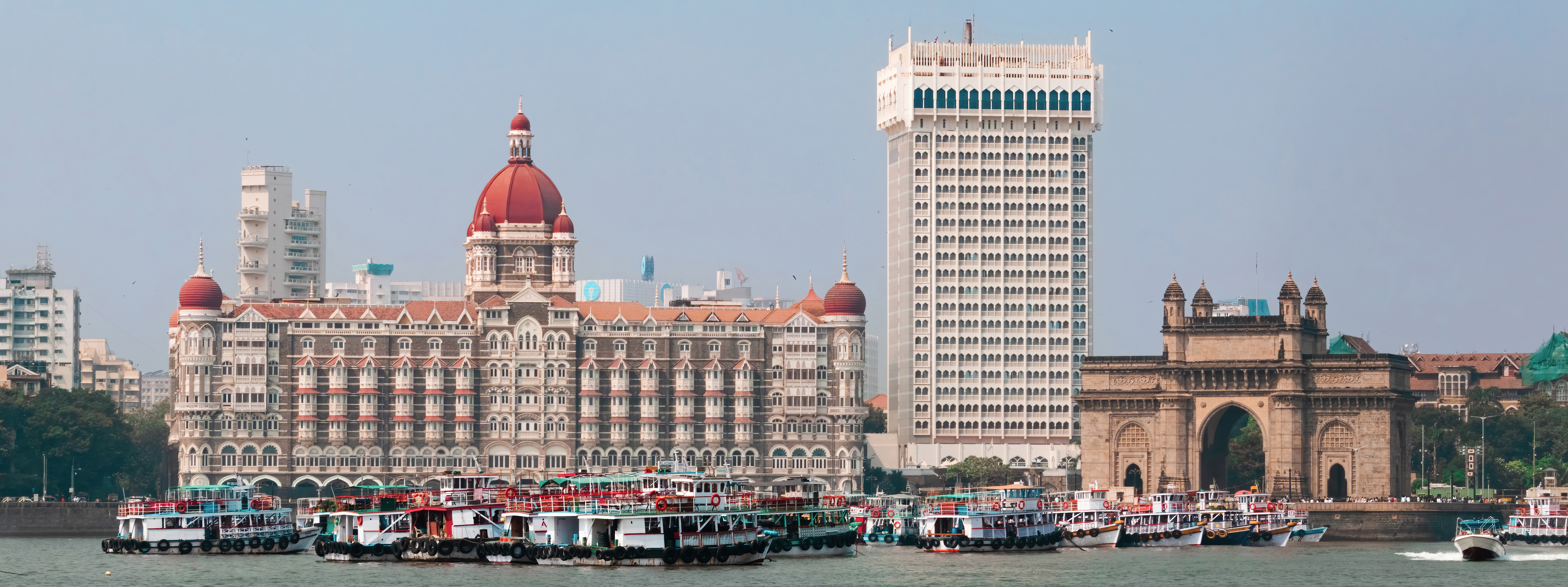
The Gateway as seen with the Taj Mahal Palace and Tower Hotel

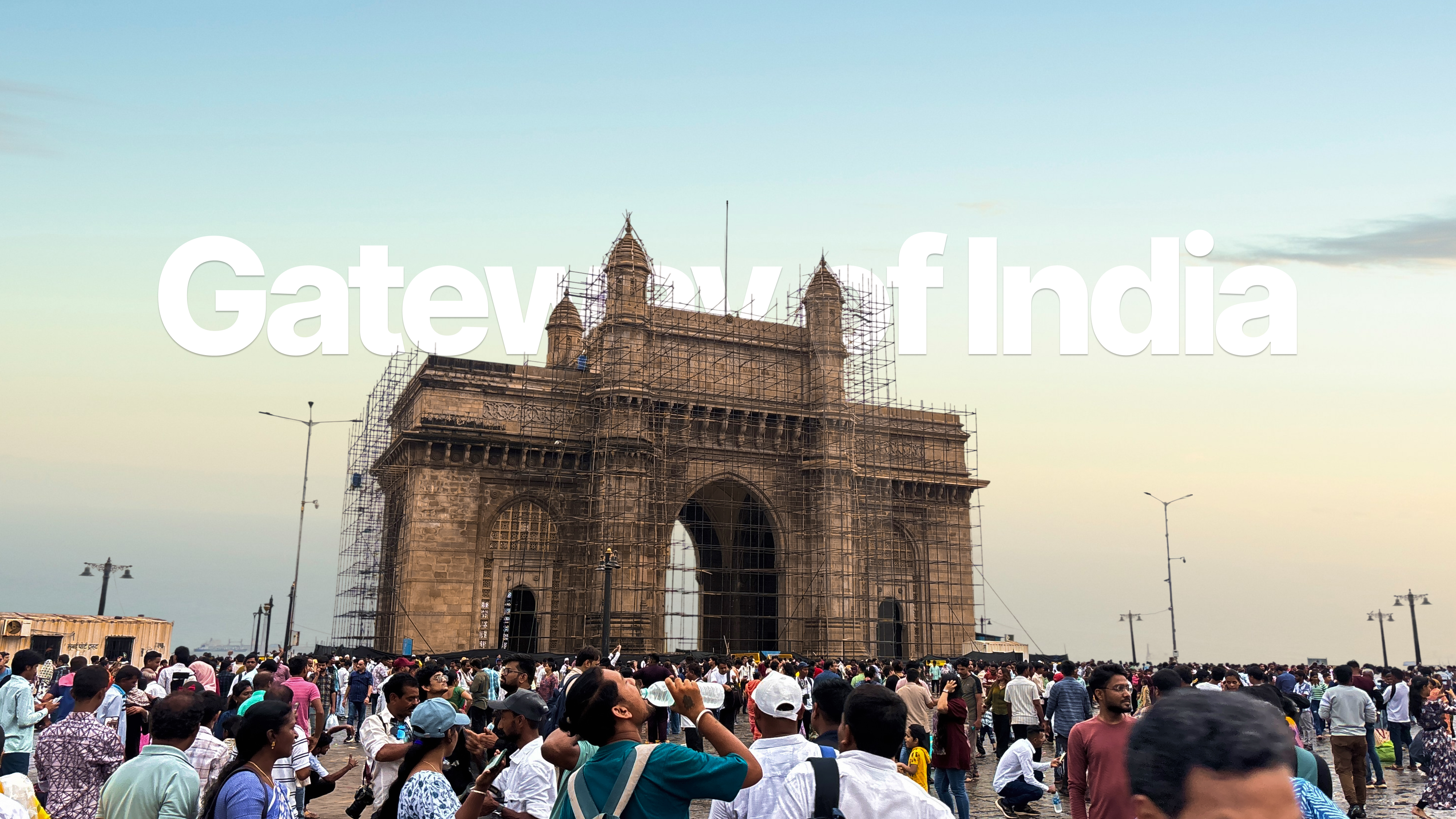
Gateway of India in 2025
