= Advertising Standards Council of India =

Indian advertising regulatory organization

The Advertising Standards Council of India
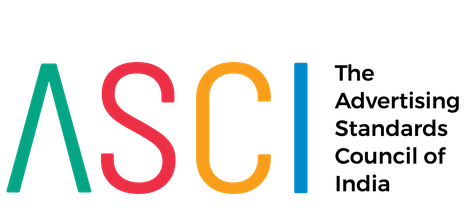
- Abbreviation: ASCI
- Established: 1985; 41 years ago
- Type: Self-regulatory organization
- Legal status: Nonprofit organization
- Purpose: Advertising regulator
- Headquarters: 402 / A, Aurus Chambers, Shivram Seth Amritwar Marg, Worli, Mumbai, Maharashtra, India
- Region served: India
- Field: Advertising
- Members: Yes (2024)
- Secretary General: Manisha Kapoor
- Chairman: Saugata Gupta
- Vice Chairman: Partha Sinha
- Honorary Treasurer: Sudhanshu Vats
- Main organ: Consumer Complaints Council
- Website: ascionline.in

The Advertising Standards Council of India (ASCI) is a voluntary self-regulatory organization of the advertising industry in India. Established in 1985, ASCI is registered as a non-profit company under section 8 of the Company Act.

ASCI is committed to the cause of self-regulation in advertising, ensuring the protection of the interest of consumers. ASCI seeks to ensure that advertisements conform to its Code for Self-Regulation, which requires advertisements to be legal, decent, honest and truthful, and not hazardous or harmful while observing fairness in competition. ASCI looks into complaints across ALL MEDIA such as Print, TV, Radio, hoardings, SMS, Emailers, Internet/web-site, product packaging, brochures, promotional material and point of sale material etc. ASCI’s role has been acclaimed by various Government bodies including the Department of Consumer Affairs (DoCA), Food Safety and Standards Authority of India (FSSAI), Ministry of AYUSH as well as the Ministry of Information and Broadcasting. The association with these Government bodies is to co-regulate and curb misleading and objectionable advertisements in the respective sectors. In January 2017, the Supreme Court of India in its judgement also affirmed and recognized the self-regulatory mechanism as an effective pre-emptive step to statutory provisions in the sphere of advertising content regulation for TV and Radio in India. ASCI is a part of the Executive Committee of International Council on Ad Self-Regulation (ICAS). Among several awards bestowed by the European Advertising Standards Alliance (EASA), ASCI bagged two Gold Global Best Practice Awards for the Mobile App "ASCIonline" (2016) and for reducing the time taken to process complaints (2013).

== Origin ==
The four main constituents of advertising industry, viz. advertisers, advertising agencies, media and allied professions came together to form ASCI. The aim of ASCI is to maintain and enhance the public's confidence in advertising. Their mandate is that all advertising material must be truthful, legal and honest, decent and not objectify women, safe for consumers - especially children and last but not the least, fair to their competitors.

== Members of ASCI ==
ASCI’s team consists of the Board of Governors, the Consumer Complaints Council (CCC) and its Secretariat. ASCI has 16 members in its Board of Governors, four each representing the key sectors such as Advertisers, advertising agencies, media and allied professions such as market research, consulting, business education etc. The CCC currently has about 28 members: 6 are from within the industry and 8 are from the civil society like well-known doctors, lawyers, journalists, academics, consumer activists, etc. The CCC’s decision on complaint against any advertisement is final. ASCI also has its own independent Secretariat of 5 members which is headed by the Secretary General.

There is no other non-governmental body in India that regulates the advertising content that is released in India. If an ad that is released in India seems objectionable, a person can write to ASCI with their complaint. This complaint will be deliberated on by the CCC after providing due process to the advertiser to defend the ad against the complaint, and depending on whether the ad is in alignment with the ASCI code and law of the land, the complaint is upheld or not upheld and if upheld then the ad is voluntarily either withdrawn or modified.

In 2007, the Government of India amended the Cable TV Network Rules’ Advertising Code by which ads that violate ASCI code cannot be permitted on TV.

== Self-Regulation ==
Almost all professional fields have self-regulatory bodies governing their activities. For the advertising fraternity, until 1985 there was none. Due to this, there was a lot of false, misleading, and offensive advertising. This led to consumers losing faith in advertising and hence resenting it. It was decided that if this continued it would not take time for statutory regulations such as censorship to be imposed on advertising content.

In 1985, the ASCI adopted a Code for Self-Regulation in Advertising. With the introduction of the code, the aim is to promote honest and decent advertising and fair competition in the industry. It will also ensure the protection of consumer interests and all concerned with the ad industry - advertisers, media, advertising agencies and others who help in the creation or placement of advertisements.

As the fraternity starts accepting the code, it will result in fewer false claims, fewer unfair advertisements and increased respect for advertisers.

== Need for ASCI ==
When an advertiser is creating an ad, the consumer is his audience. The feedback from a consumer is important to the advertiser so he can be assured if his message has been correctly conveyed. If a consumer feels that a particular advertisement is in bad taste or is false in its claims, they need a body or council to whom they can air their grievances and who will take any appropriate action, if necessary. ASCI as a self-regulatory body governing advertising content is the ideal medium as its purpose is to serve both the advertisers as well as the consumers.
