= Apni Azadi Ko Hum Hargis Mita Sakte Nahin =

Song by Mohammed Rafi

from the album Leader soundtrack
- Language: Hindi
- Released: 1965
- Recorded: 1964
- Genre: Ganasangeet
- Label: Saregama
- Composer: Naushad
- Lyricist: Shakeel Badayuni
- Producer: Shashdhar Mukerjee

"Apni Azadi Ko Hum Hargiz Mita Sakte Nahin" (transl. We cannot ever erase our freedom) is a Hindi song from the 1965 film Leader directed by Ram Mukherjee, starring Dilip Kumar and Vyjayanthimala. The song, written by Shakeel Badayuni, composed by Naushad, and originally sung by Mohammed Rafi, is a patriotic song about freedom and the independence from the British occupation of India.

The song has been covered by many artists worldwide, and reissued, together with the film's soundtrack, in 2004 in digital format through Saregama.

== See also ==
- Music of India
