= Rakta Nadir Dhara =

1994 Indian Bengali language action film

- Directed by: Ram Mukherjee
- Produced by: Rano Mukhopadhyay
- Starring: Chiranjeet Chakraborty; Prosenjit Chatterjee; Debashree Roy; Sabyasachi Chakraborty; Chinmoy Ray; Debraj Ray; Nirmal Kumar; Soumitra Bandyopadhyay; Dulal Lahiri; Anamika Saha
- Music by: Bappi Lahiri
- Release date: 15 April 1994
- Country: India
- Language: Bengali

Rakta Nadir Dhara (lit. 'The flow of the bloody river') is a 1994 Bengali-language Indian action film directed by Ram Mukherjee, starring Chiranjeet Chakraborty, Prosenjit Chatterjee, Debashree Roy, and Sabyasachi Chakraborty in the lead roles. The film was bankrolled by Rano Mukhopadhyay. The score and soundtrack of the film were composed by Bappi Lahiri.

== Plot ==
Andaman-based criminal Jaga Gunda is an international terrorist. Police officer Rupen Roy arrests him and the court sentences him to 21 years of imprisonment. However, Jaga escapes from jail with the help of a corrupt cop Sachin and kills Rupen Roy's family. Rupen's only child is alive because he lives in a missionary school. Jaga also kills the judge and the witness of the case. Their sons unite and avenge the death of their family.

== Cast ==
- Chiranjeet Chakraborty in a dual role as
  - Rupen Roy
  - Roni Roy
- Prosenjit Chatterjee as Partho Chatterjee - A CBI officer
- Debashree Roy as Rekha
- Sabyasachi Chakraborty as Abinash Sarkar
- Chinmoy Ray as Dwinanath Sarkar
- Dulal Lahiri as Jagannath Chowdhury aka Joga / OV Roy
- Debraj Roy as Minister Kalyan Bose
- Nirmal Kumar as Rupen's father
- Anamika Saha
- Soumitra Bandyopadhyay as Jailor Sachin
- Bodhisattwa Mazumdar as Constable Dibakar
- Ashok Mukherjee as Judge Ashok Chatterjee

== Music ==
Rakta Nadir Dhara

Soundtrack album by Bappi Lahiri
- Released: 21 September 1993
- Recorded: 1993
- Genre: Feature film soundtrack
- Length: 36:32
- Label: Venus Worldwide Entertainment

The film's musical album comprises 7 tracks all composed by Bappi Lahiri. Venus Worldwide Entertainment bagged the audio rights. The songs upon release garnered positive reviews and topped the musical charts.

=== Track listing ===
No.	Title	Length
1.	"Aami Aaj Holam"	5:50
2.	"Ghumtar Tolaye Khamtar"	5:23
3.	"Bhulo Na Kono Din"	6:11
4.	"Bhulo Na Kono Din (sad)"	1:32
5.	"Bhalobasha Paye"	6:05
6.	"Oye Komo Ba"	6:27
7.	"Tomar Buke Aamar Buke"	4:47
Total length:		36:32

== See also ==
- Bhai Amar Bhai, 1996 Indian Bengali film
