= Shadaab Khan =

Indian film actor (born 1973)

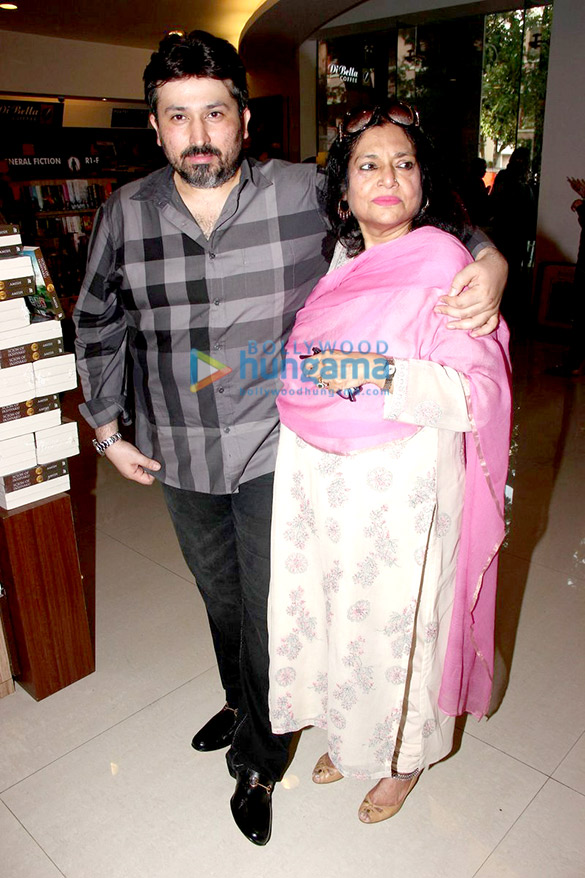
- Shadaab Khan with mother Shehla Khan in 2015
- Born: 20 September 1973 (age 52); Bombay, Maharashtra, India
- Citizenship: Indian
- Occupations: Actor, film director, author
- Years active: 1996–present
- Spouse: Rumana Achwa (m. 2005)
- Parent: Amjad Khan (father)
- Relatives: Jayant (paternal grandfather); Akhtar ul Iman (maternal grandfather); Imtiaz Khan (paternal uncle); Zafar Karachiwala (brother-in-law)

Shadaab Khan (born 20 September 1973) is an Indian Hindi film actor, writer, and film director. He is the son of actor Amjad Khan.

== Personal life ==
Shadaab Khan was born on 20 September 1973 in Bombay, Maharashtra, India (now Mumbai) into a Muslim family to parents Amjad Khan and Shaila Khan.

Shadaab is of Pashtun descent on his father's side, traced back to Peshawar, North-West Frontier Province (now in Khyber Pakhtunkhwa, Pakistan), where his grandfather Zakaria Khan, better known as Jayant, was born and raised. Through his mother, his grandfather is Akhtar ul Iman, an Urdu poet and screenwriter in the Hindi film industry who has written the dialogues for two of Yash Chopra's best-known movies, Waqt (1965) and Ittefaq (1969).

He has two siblings, brother Seemab Khan, a club cricketer, and sister Ahlam Khan, an actress and screenwriter married to actor Zafar Karachiwala. He is married to Rumana Achwa since 2005.

== Books ==
Shadaab Khan has been writing since the age of 8 and has published two fiction books: Shanti Memorial, a collection of novellas in the horror and thriller genres, in 2013 and Murder in Bollywood, a crime novel, in 2015.

== Filmography ==
=== Films ===
Film	Year	Actor	Director	Writer	Notes	Ref.
Pyaari Bhabhi	1985	Yes			Film debut; child actor	
Raja Ki Aayegi Baaraat	1996	Yes				
Betaabi	1997	Yes				
Hey Ram	2000	Yes			Supporting role	
Refugee	2000	Yes			Supporting role	
Bharat Bhagya Vidhata	2002	Yes			Supporting role	
Highway 203	2007	No	Yes	Yes		
Romeo Akbar Walter	2019	Yes			Supporting role	

=== Television ===
Show	Year	Role	Notes
Scam 1992	2020	Ajay Kedia	8 Episodes
