= Radio in India =

Radio broadcasting began in India in 1923. The Government owned radio station All India Radio dominated broadcasting since 1936 but through privatization and deregulation has allowed commercial privately owned talk and music stations to reach large audiences.

== History ==
=== Early radio ===
Radio Broadcasting began in June 1923 during the British Raj with programs by the Bombay Presidency Radio Club and other radio clubs. According to an agreement on 23 July 1927, the private Indian Broadcasting Company Ltd (IBC) was authorized to operate two radio stations: the Bombay station which began on 23 July 1927, and the Calcutta station which followed on 26 August 1927. The company went into liquidation on 1 March 1930. The government took over the broadcasting facilities and began the Indian State Broadcasting Service (ISBS) on 1 April 1930 on an experimental basis for two years, and permanently in May 1932 it then went on to become All India Radio on 8 June 1936. When India attained independence, there were six radio stations within Indian territory, at Delhi, Bombay, Calcutta, Madras, Tiruchirapalli and Lucknow. FM broadcasting began on 23 July 1977 in Madras.

== Transmission ==
Currently, analog terrestrial radio broadcast in India is carried out in Short Wave(SW) (6–22 MHz), Medium Wave(MW) (526–1606 kHz)and Frequency Modulation (FM) (88–108 MHz). All India Radio the public service broadcaster – has established 467 radio stations encompassing 662 radio transmitters, which include 140 MW, 48 SW, and 474 FM transmitters for providing radio broadcasting services in India. Private sector radio broadcasters transmit in FM mode only.

== Public Radio ==
=== All India Radio ===
All India Radio(AIR), officially known since 1956 as 'Akashvani' is the national public radio broadcaster of India. It was established in 1936. All India Radio is the largest radio network in the world, and one of the largest broadcasting organizations in the world in terms of the number of languages broadcast and the spectrum of socio-economic and cultural diversity it serves. AIR's home service comprises 420 stations located across the country, reaching nearly 92% of the country's area and 99.19% of the total population. AIR originates programming in 23 languages and 179 dialects.

== Private radio ==
Private participation wasn't allowed until 1993 when the government experimented with a daily, two-hour private show slot on the FM channels in Delhi and Mumbai. In 2001 the first phase of private sector participation (FM Phase I) India's radio sector began and the government conducted open auctions r a radio licenses. Of the 108 licenses issued, only 22 became operational in 12 cities. Radio City Bangalore, which started on July 3, 2001, is India's first private FM radio station. The second development phase of radio privatization was in 2005(FM Phase II) with 338 FM slots up for auction. 245 frequencies were taken up in the auction and the government earned US$295 million in one-time entry fees. In 2019 the Ministry of Information and Broadcasting (India) had sought Telecom Regulatory Authority of India's recommendation on reserve prices for auctions of radio frequencies in 283 cities to expand private FM radio across the country. This includes 23 existing cities where the government has auctioned private FM radio frequencies in the previous batches, while 260 cities will see auctions of private FM radio for the first time. In 2020 April TRAI had issued recommendations on reserve price for auction of FM radio channels under FM Phase III policy.

The major private radio players in India are Entertainment Network India Limited which hosts Radio Mirchi, BIG FM 92.7, Jagran Prakashan Group's, Music Broadcast Limited which hosts Radio City (Indian radio station), D B Corp Ltd. which hosts My FM & Sun Network which in turn hosts Red FM. Currently, there are 371 private FM stations operating across 107 cities in India. Out of these, 31 are operated by micro, small & medium enterprises (MSMEs).

== Community radio stations ==
In December 2002, the government of India approved policy for the grant of licenses for setting up of community radio stations to well-established educational institutions including IITs/IIMs. On 1 February 2004, Anna FM was launched as India's first campus “community” radio station by Dr. Sreedher Ramamurthy, the then Director of its Audio visual Research centre of the Anna University. He is regarded as the father of community radio in India.

In 2006, the government of India amended the community radio policy which allowed the agricultural universities, educational institutions and civil society institutions such as NGOs to apply for a community radio broadcasting license under the FM band 88–108 MHz. First NGO operated community Radio in India was Sangham Radio licensed to Deccan Development Society which started broadcasting on 2008 in Pastapur village, Medak district, Andhra Pradesh.

As of January 2024, there are 481 Community Radio Stations in India. serving farmer, tribal, coastal communities, ethnic minorities and special interests.

== Amateur radio stations ==
The first amateur radio operator was licensed in 1921, and by the mid-1930s, there were around 20 amateur radio operators in India. Amateur radio operators played an important part in the Indian independence movement with the establishment of illegal pro-independence radio stations in the 1940s. India has around 16,000 licensed users of Amateur radio in India.

== Market share ==
In April 2020, as per a survey by AZ Research PPL, commissioned by the Association of Radio Operators for India, radio listenership in India touched a peak of 51 million.

=== Advertising revenue ===
According to a 2019 report by FICCI-EY, the radio industry grew 7.5% in 2018. It contributes 4.2% to the overall advertising revenues of the media and entertainment sector. Radio advertising revenue in India is estimated to almost double in the next five years, to ₹ 3,900 crore from ₹ 2,000 crore in 2015, rating agency CRISIL said in a report released in March 2020.

== See also ==
- List of radio stations in India
