= Lalit (raga) =

Raga in Hindustani classical music

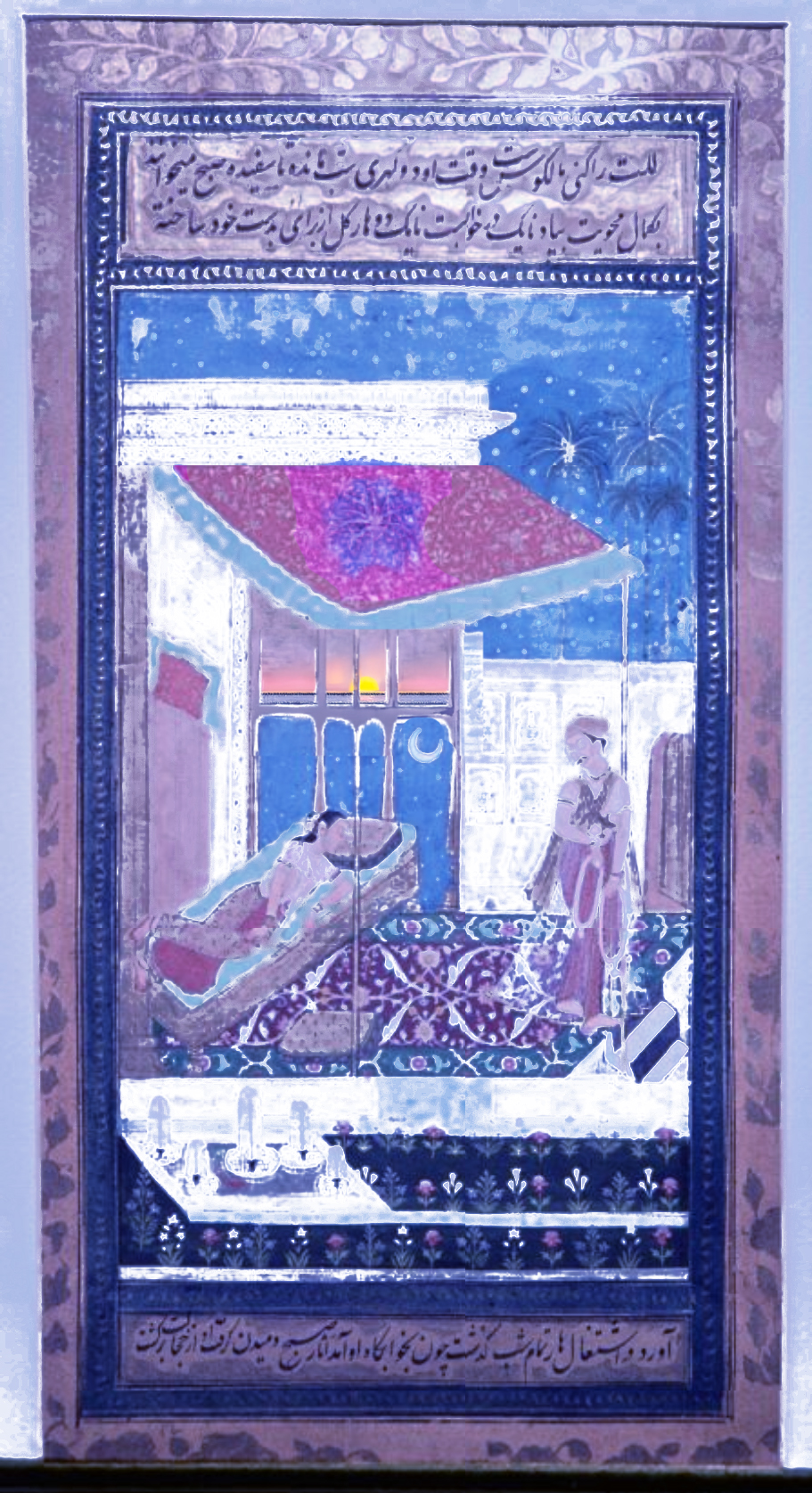
- Thaat: Poorvi

Lalit (also known as Lalat) is a prominent raga in Hindustani classical music. It is commonly described as serene and devotional and is performed at dawn time of the day.

The swara (notes of the Indian musical scale) of Lalit put emphasis on the minor second (Re) and minor sixth (Dha), and include natural and sharp fourth (Ma), but omit the commonly used perfect fifth (Pa). Author Peter Lavezzoli stated the raga was difficult to play for Western classical musicians because of its scale. Jairazbhoy argued the use of both forms of Ma was an apparent chromaticism, but that one of the Ma notes was a diminished Pa. Lalit with a different scale was identified in the 16th century, and a raga Lalita existed before.

Pakad - Chalan of Lalit: Re♭, Ma-Ma#-Ma Ga Ma, Ma#Ni, Sa

As can be seen from above, the raga uses both the flat and the upper Ma and that makes this raga very distinct from other ragas. Deliberate oscillation on the cusp formed between Ma-Ma# and Ni is commonly heard.

In the Gwalior tradition of singing, and among many dhrupadiyas(colloquial term used to refer Dhrupad singers), Lalit is sung with a shuddh dhaivat (natural sixth), and has a slightly different chalan (way of moving).

Arohan : N r G M d N S'

Avarohan : S' N d, M d M m, G M G r S;

Jati : Shadhav - Shadhav Vakra

Time of playing : 4th Prahar of the Night (3AM to 6AM)

Vadi : Shuddha Madhyam

Samvadi : Shadaj

== Film songs ==
Song	Movie	Composer	Artists
Ek Shahenshah Ne Banvaa Ke Hasin Tajmahal	Leader (1964 film)	Naushad	Mohammed Rafi & Lata Mangeshkar
Pritam Daras Dikhao	Chacha Zindabad(1959 film)	Madan Mohan (composer)	Manna Dey & Lata Mangeshkar
Tu Hai Mera Prem Devta	Kalpana (1960 film)	O. P. Nayyar	Manna Dey & Mohammed Rafi
Badi Dheere Jali	Ishqiya	Vishal Bhardwaj	Rekha Bhardwaj

=== Language:Tamil ===
Song	Movie	Composer	Singer
Vazhkkai Odam	Aval Appadithan	Ilaiyaraaja	S. Janaki
Engeyo Etho (Charanam in Lalit)	Nadhiyai Thedi Vandha Kadal	Ilaiyaraaja	S. P. Balasubrahmanyam, P. Susheela
Dheiveega Raagam	Ullasa Paravaigal	Ilaiyaraaja	Jency Anthony, Vani Jairam

=== Language:Hindi ===
Song	Movie	Composer	Singer
Raina Beeti Jaye	Amar Prem	R.D. Burman	Lata Mangeshkar
Ek shehenshah ne banwake	Leader	Naushad	Lata Mangeshkar, Mohd Rafi

== Hindustani Classical Music Composition(Bandish) set in Raga Lalit ==
Creator - Composer	Taal	Composition(Bandish)
Acharya Pandit Dr Gokulotsavji Maharaj	Matta Taal	"ऐसो ढ़ीत लंगरवा"
Shubha Mudgal (Singer)	Keharwa Taal	Nainan lagi

== Ragamala paintings ==
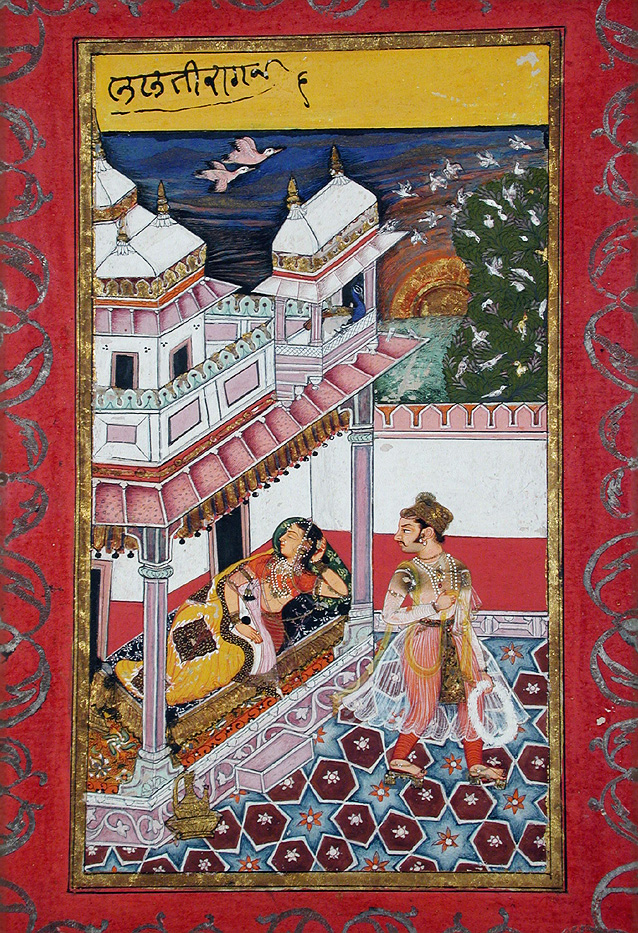
ca. 1660

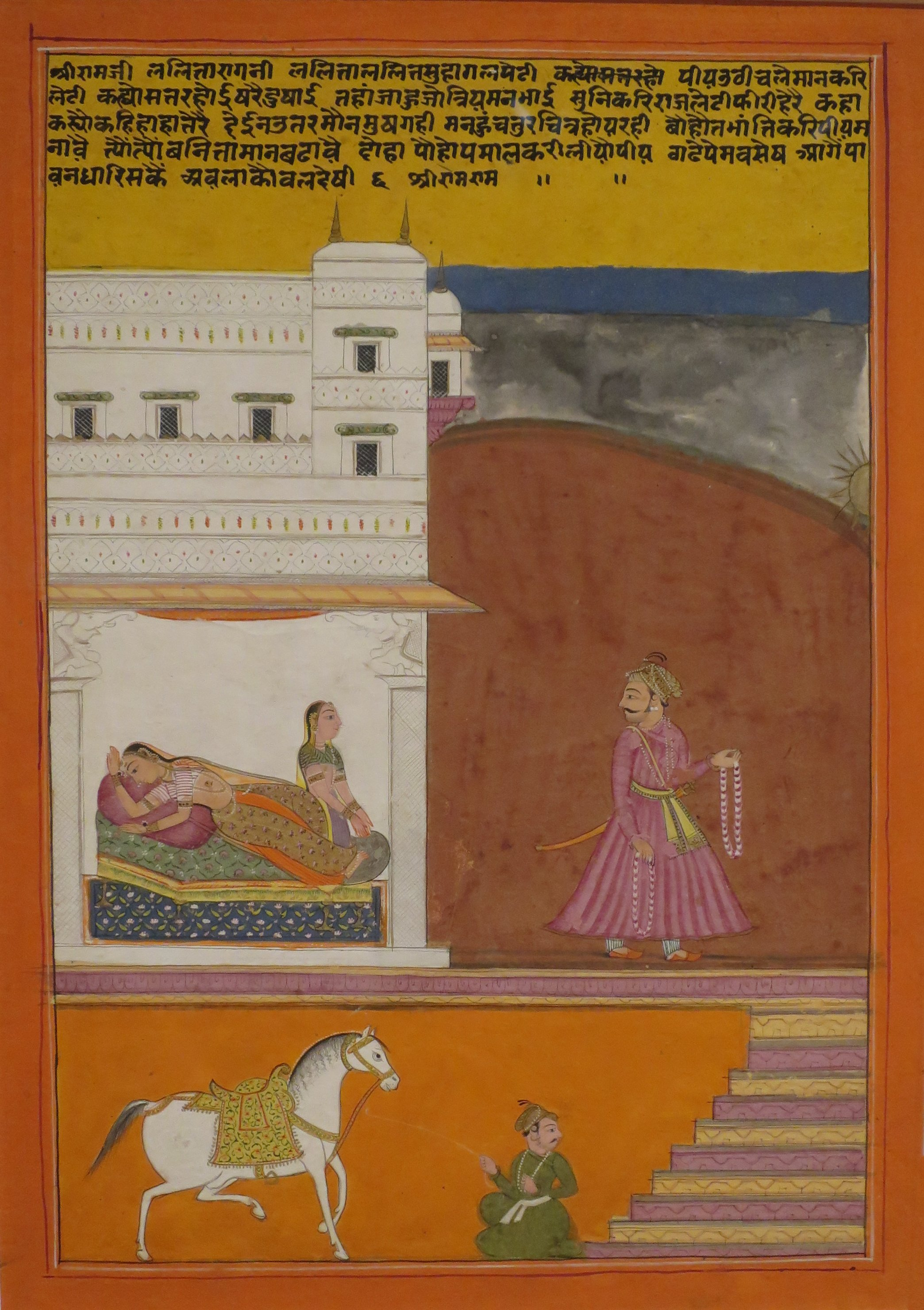
Amer, Rajasthan, 1746

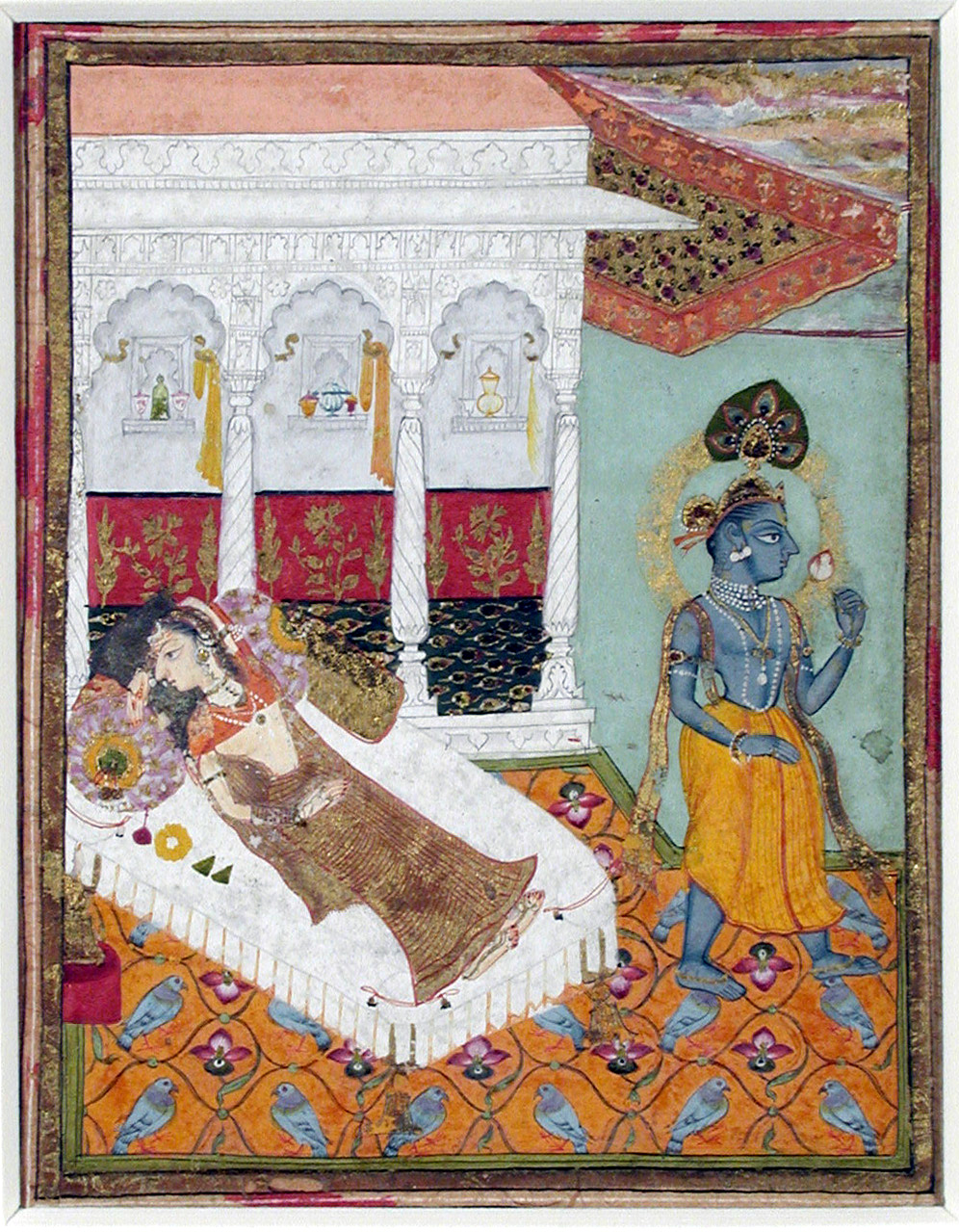
1710

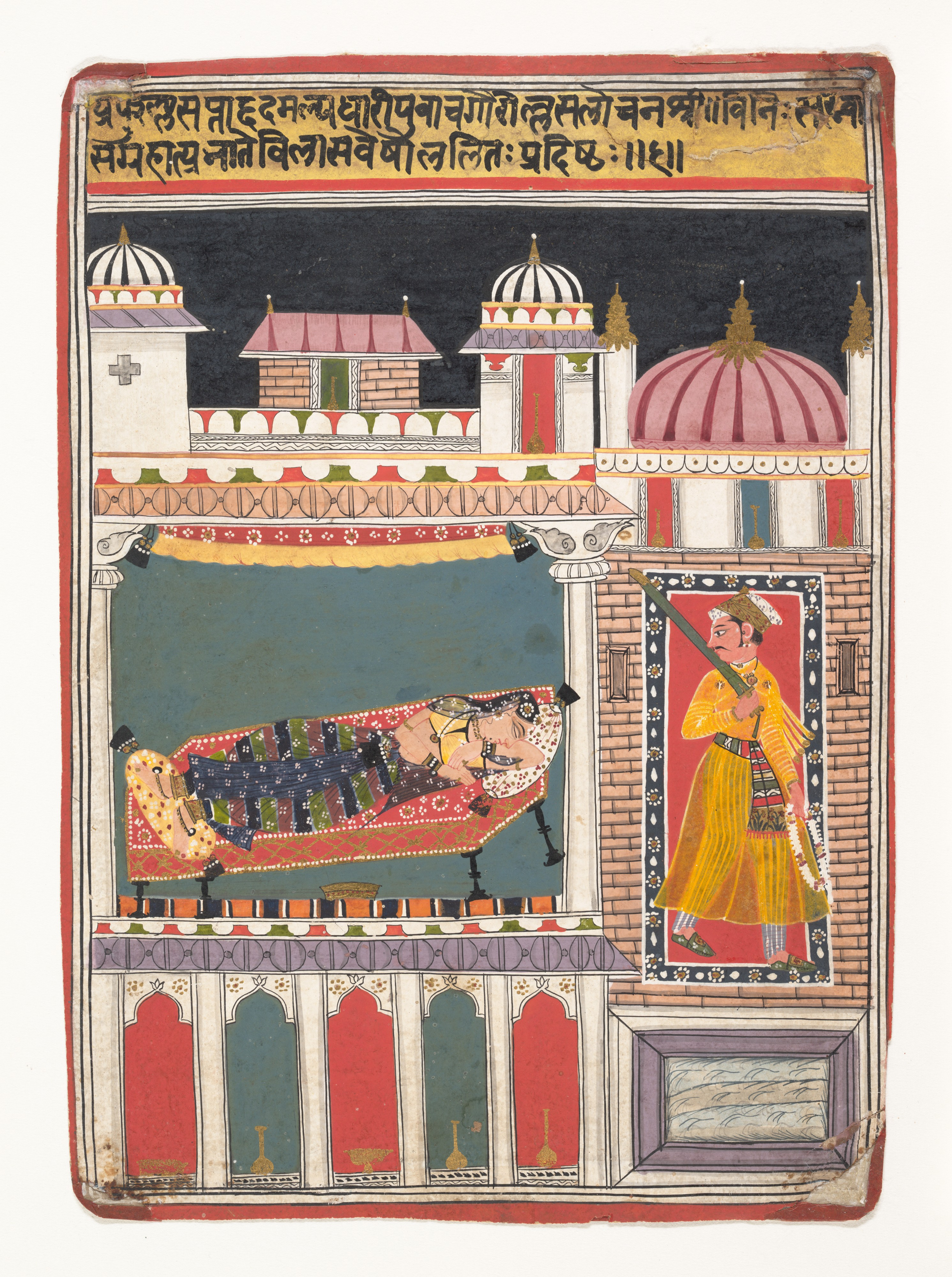
Madhya Pradesh, Malwa ca. 1680–90
