= Raja Ki Aayegi Baaraat =

Raja Ki Aayegi Baraat
- Directed by: Ashok Gaikwad
- Written by: Santosh Saroj
- Produced by: Salim Akhtar
- Starring: Mohnish Bahl; Shadaab Khan; Rani Mukerji; Gulshan Grover
- Cinematography: Anwar Siraj
- Edited by: Waman Bhonsle
- Music by: Aadesh Shrivastav
- Production company: Aftab Pictures
- Distributed by: Shemaroo Entertainment
- Release date: 18 October 1996
- Country: India
- Language: Hindi
- Budget: ₹2 crore
- Box office: ₹3.14 crore

Raja Ki Aayegi Baaraat (transl. The King's Entourage Will Arrive) is a 1996 Indian Hindi-language drama film written and directed by Ashok Gaikwad. The film stars Mohnish Bahl, Shadaab Khan, Rani Mukerji and Gulshan Grover. The film marked the Hindi film debut of Mukerji and the lead debut of Khan. Starting in 1995, principal photography took place in Gangtok and was coordinated with the filming of Biyer Phool, another home production of Ram Mukherjee, Rani's father, which Rani was simultaneously shooting in the area.

== Plot ==
Mala, a young school teacher, has idealistic dreams for her future. She hopes for a grand love affair with a large, extravagant wedding and a dashing bridegroom who will arrive on a horse. One day, Mala's friend confides in her about her relationship with the son of a wealthy man, with whom she has been intimate, but he is now marrying someone else. Mala accompanies her friend to the man's wedding and successfully manages to disrupt it and reveal the truth. The groom's friend, Raj, is enraged and insults Mala. In response, Mala slaps him. Looking for revenge, Raj seeks out Mala and, in the presence of her pupils, beats and rapes her. Mala is distraught and ashamed. She gets home to her shocked family with the help of her students. The police get involved and arrest Raj. The issue goes to court.

Raj's powerful father, Rai Bahadur, attempts to cover up the situation by bribing Mala's guardian Karthar Singh, who refuses to accept the money. Raj's sister and brother-in-law support Mala and defend her in the case. The judge finds Raj guilty. He is ordered to marry Mala in the next twenty-four hours, as her honor has been ruined and likely no other man would be willing to marry her, in her eyes. Raj tries to kill Mala and fails. The two get married without great pomp and ceremony. After the wedding, Mala moves into Raj's home, and his family begins to treat her badly. Rai Bahadur travels abroad and instructs his family to belittle and torture Mala with the ultimate goal of driving her from their house. Raj's elder sister-in-law Sharda is especially tough on Mala, since she had plotted for her own sister to marry Raj and gain access to his wealth.

Sharda and her siblings lie to Raj about Mala, telling him that she asked them to leave the house. Raj angrily tries to beat Mala but is stopped by Karthar Singh. Raj's uncle makes plans for the couple's honeymoon and promises to protect Mala. However, it is revealed that he is trying to kill her.

Raj's uncle leaves a snake in the house while Mala is showering. While getting dressed, she sees the snake and faints out of fear. The men believe that the snake bit her. While Raj checks Mala's vital signs, the snake bites his leg. Mala wakes up and saves him, but she is poisoned in the process. Raj is shocked at Mala's actions and realizes that his treatment of her was wrong. His uncle tells Raj that he should leave Mala to die. Instead, Raj calls a doctor, and Mala recovers from the snake venom. His attitude towards her softens, and he stands up to his uncle, who tries to influence him against Mala. The couple gradually fall in love.

Seeking revenge, Raj's uncle and Sharda plot to kill Mala via a gas explosion in the house. Raj's sister and brother-in-law arrive at the house unexpectedly. His sister goes into the kitchen to light the stove, which results in her death. Rai Bahadur returns to India for his daughter's funeral, and he argues with Raj about Mala. When Raj decides to leave, an altercation breaks out. Mala is badly wounded. Raj takes her to the hospital. She is in critical condition.

The family realize the folly of their terrible treatment of Mala. They tell Rai Bahadur that they do not want to have anything to do with him. Rai Bahadur comes to apologize. When the police arrive to investigate the matter, Raj tries to spare his father and implicate himself, but Rai Bahadur accepts the fault for the explosion. Mala regains consciousness, and she saves her father-in-law by lying about the incident. After seeing Mala's kind character, she is formally accepted into Raj's family. Mala and Raj are remarried in a grand ceremony similar to Mala's dreams.

== Cast ==
- Mohnish Bahl as Ramesh
- Shadaab Khan as Raj Bahadur Diwanchand
- Rani Mukerji as Mala (credited as Ranee)
- Gulshan Grover as Gyani Kartar Singh, Mala's foster father.
- Saeed Jaffrey as Rai Bahadur Diwanchand
- Shashi Sharma as Sharda, Rai Bahadur's elder daughter-in-law.
- Divya Dutta as Reena, Sharda's sister
- Asrani as Manesh, Sharda's brother
- Sulabha Deshpande as Kaushalya, Maid servant.
- Yunus Parvez as Judge Saxena
- Javed Khan as Pratap, Mala's lawyer.
- Arjun as Police Inspector Khan
- Dinesh Hingoo as Lal Singh, Mechanic Kartar's autoservice
- Raza Murad as Raj's Uncle "Mama"
- Goga Kapoor as Gyan Prakash
- Javed Khan Amrohi as Anand Akela, Mechanic Kartar's autoservice
- Ghanshyam Rohera as Mishra, Mechanic Kartar's autoservice
- Jennifer Winget as School kid

== Production ==
The movie was filmed in Gangtok in 1995, concurrently with the Bengali-language Biyer Phool, both of which were home productions directed by Ram Mukherjee and marked Rani Mukerji's Hindi and Bengali debuts respectively. Rani Mukerji has recalled that her father, filmmaker Ram Mukherjee, underwent heart surgery on the day of the film's release (18 October 1996). After being discharged from the hospital, he attended a screening at Mumbai's Gaiety Galaxy theatre in a wheelchair, where he "wept like a child in happiness" upon seeing the audience's reaction to her performance. Initially reluctant to accept the role, Rani Mukerji later agreed to star in the film, stating that she "gave [her] best in every scene." Reflecting on her experience with director Ashok Gaikwad, she recalled feeling tense on set, noting that if she failed to deliver a shot correctly, he would scold her, after which she would usually perform the next take successfully.

== Music ==
1. "Aankhein Ladi Tumse" - Kumar Sanu, Asha Bhosle
2. "Chanda Ki Chori Karke Chakori" - Aditya Narayan, Kavita Krishnamurthy, Sababat Akhtar
3. "I Love You" - Vinod Rathore, Poornima
4. "Kya Roop Hai Tera Kya Rang Hai Tera" - Udit Narayan, Poornima
5. 'Love Bird Kehte Hai Mujhko" - Vijay Benedict
6. "Palkon Mein Sapne Chamke Ahista" - Poornima
7. "Rab Ka Hoon Banda" - Mangal Singh
8. "Raja Ki Aayi Hai Baraat" - Vijayta Pandit

== Reception ==
In retrospective coverage, Raja Ki Aayegi Baaraat gained renewed public attention due to a viral clip of a scene in which the protagonist, played by Rani Mukerji, sucks venom from a snakebite. Commenting on the sequence, cardiothoracic surgeon Dr. Shriram Nene, husband of actress Madhuri Dixit, humorously described it as "pure cinema" while noting the medical inaccuracy of the act, stating, "You can’t suck out snake venom like that—it doesn’t work."

Contemporary critics held the film as severely regressive and problematic, with The Times of India commenting that "its Neanderthal morality even managed to overshadow how bad the film itself was."
