= Leader (1964 film) =

- Poster
- Directed by: Ram Mukherjee
- Written by: Ram Mukherjee (screenplay); Harish Mehra (screenplay and dialogue); Wajahat Mirza (dialogue)
- Story by: Dilip Kumar
- Produced by: Sashadhar Mukherjee
- Starring: Dilip Kumar; Vyjayanthimala; Jayant
- Cinematography: V. Babasaheb
- Edited by: S.E. Chandivale
- Music by: Naushad; Shakeel Badayuni (lyrics)
- Release date: 27 March 1964
- Running time: 176 minutes
- Country: India
- Language: Hindi

Leader is a 1964 Indian Hindi-language political drama film directed by Ram Mukherjee, produced by Sashadhar Mukherjee and written by Dilip Kumar. The film stars Dilip Kumar, Vyjayanthimala and Jayant. The film underperformed commercially.

The film's music is by Naushad, with lyrics by Shakeel Badayuni, it is noted for the patriotic song "Apni Azaadi Ko Hum Hargiz Mita Sakte Nahin" and "Mujhe Duniyawalon Sharabi Na Samjho", by Mohammed Rafi.

== Plot ==
Vijay Khanna is a law graduate-cum-tabloid editor. He falls in love with Princess Sunita, while general elections are underway. Vijay becomes accused of a political leader's murder. Gradually, the couple tries to expose a criminal-politician nexus.

== Cast ==
- Dilip Kumar as Vijay Khanna
- Vyjayanthimala as Princess Sunita
- Nazir Hussain as Mr. Khanna
- Leela Mishra as Mrs. Khanna
- Motilal as Acharya
- Hiralal as Kargah
- D. K. Sapru as King of Shah Garh
- Jayant as Diwan Mahendranath

== Music ==
Leader

Soundtrack album by Naushad
- Released: 1964
- Genre: Feature film soundtrack
- Label: Saregama

Naushad chronology
Mere Mehboob (1963)	Leader (1964)	Dil Diya Dard Liya (1966)

The score and soundtrack for the movie were composed by Naushad and the lyrics were penned by Shakeel Badayuni. The soundtrack consists of 8 songs, featuring vocals by Mohammed Rafi, Lata Mangeshkar and Asha Bhosle. The soundtrack album was reissued in digital format in 2004 through Saregama.

In the two songs "Aaj Hai Pyar Ka Faisla" and "Daiya Re Daiya", sung by Lata Mangeshkar and Asha Bhosle respectively, Mohammed Rafi has done small alap many times in between the songs.

Song	Singer	Raag
"Aaj Hai Pyar Ka Faisla"	Lata Mangeshkar	Ahir Bhairav
"Tere Husn Ki Kya Tareef Karoon"	Lata Mangeshkar, Mohammed Rafi	Yaman Kalyan
"Ek Shahenshah Ne Banwake Haseen Tajmahal"	Lata Mangeshkar, Mohammed Rafi	Lalit
"Apni Azaadi Ko Hum"	Mohammed Rafi	
"Hameen Se Mohabbat"	Mohammed Rafi	
"Mujhe Duniyawalon"	Mohammed Rafi	
"Aaj Kal Shauq-E-Deedar Hai"	Mohammed Rafi, Asha Bhosle	
"Daiya Re Daiya"	Asha Bhosle	Darbari Kanada

== Awards ==
- Filmfare Award for Best Actor for Dilip Kumar
