= Biyer Phool =

1996 Indian romantic comedy film

- Directed by: Ram Mukherjee
- Written by: Ram Mukherjee; Raja Mukherjee
- Produced by: Raja Mukherjee
- Starring: Prosenjit Chatterjee; Rani Mukerji; Indrani Haldar; Sabyasachi Chakraborty
- Cinematography: Ram Mukherjee
- Edited by: Raja Mukherjee
- Music by: Jatin–Lalit
- Distributed by: Shree Venkatesh Films
- Release date: 18 October 1996
- Running time: 183 minutes
- Country: India
- Language: Bengali

Biyer Phool (transl. Wedding Flowers) is a 1996 Indian Bengali-language romantic family drama film, directed and co-written by Ram Mukherjee. It stars Prosenjit Chatterjee, Sabyasachi Chakraborty, Indrani Haldar and Rani Mukerji in her debut.

It was shot in Gangtok and coordinated with the filming of Raja Ki Aayegi Baraat, another home production and Rani's Hindi film debut, which was simultaneously shooting in the area.

== Plot ==
Lili and Mili Chatterjee are sisters who are as different as night and day. Lili is mature and reserved and has spent her life taking care of her little sister Mili. She runs the family business with the help of her friend and general manager Ashit Mukherjee. Mili is a carefree teenager. Their grandmother, whom they lovingly call Thamma, dreams of Lili's marriage. She has no interest in marriage and asks Thama to concentrate on getting Mili married.

Meanwhile, Mili falls in love with Atanu Mukherjee, a famous music teacher from a local college who is nine years older than her. After briefly courting him, Atanu falls in love with Mili, too. One day Ashit sees the couple together, and Mili explains that she and Atanu are in love. Ashit promises to talk to Lili about Mili's marriage to Atanu once he returns from a trip to see his parents and go on a pilgrimage. Before he leaves, he convinces Lili to hire Atanu as Mili's music teacher. While with his parents, Ashit admits that he loves Lili and intends to discuss their marriage once he returns.

Lili is enamored with Atanu and his music since the moment she meets him. She is even more impressed when Atanu sings a song she wrote on television. While Mili is on a tour with her school, Thama finds out that Lili has softened to the thought of marriage. She calls Lili's uncle to town and asks him to arrange Lili and Atanu's marriage. Atanu's mother, not knowing that her son is in love with Mili, agrees to a marriage between Atanu and Lili.

Mili is ecstatic to hear of her sister's impending marriage, especially because she thinks it will clear the way for her marriage with Atanu, but is heartbroken when she finds out that her sister is in love with Atanu. Mili remembers the sacrifices that Lili has made for her and her family and decides to sacrifice her love for her sister's happiness. She begs Atanu to marry Lili. Atanu's mother asks him also to marry Lili as she has already given her word to Lili's uncle. Atanu reluctantly agrees.

During her wedding celebration, Lili notices slight differences in Mili's outlook and temperament. On her wedding day, Lili prepares to go to the altar as Mili reminisces about her time with Atanu. As she is being carried to the altar with her face covered, Ashit arrives. Believing the bride to be Mili, he reprimands her for not waiting for him to come back. When he realises that Lili is about to marry Atanu, he takes Lili aside and tells her that Mili and Atanu are in love. Lili finds Mili, dresses her like a bride, and takes her to the altar. When Lili says that she is not fated to get married, Mili vows to not marry until Lili marries. Ashit intervenes and tells Lili that he wishes to marry her. Lili is surprised to hear Ashit's declaration, and each sister weds her respective beau.

== Cast ==
- Prosenjit Chatterjee as Atanu Mukherjee
- Rani Mukerji as Mili Chatterjee
- Indrani Haldar as Lili Chatterjee
- Sabyasachi Chakraborty as Ashit Mukherjee
- Anuradha Roy as Atanu's Mother
- Mita Chatterjee as Lili and Mili's grandmother (Thamma)
- Bodhisattwa Majumdar as Lili and Mili's maternal uncle
- Shakuntala Barua as Ashit's mother
- Nirmal Kumar as Ashit's father
- Pushpita Mukherjee as Sunanda, Mili's friend
- Rita Koiral as Bindu
- Chinmoy Roy as Roghu
- Sagarika

== Soundtrack ==
All of the songs of the movie were composed by Jatin–Lalit and lyrics were penned by Pulak Bandyopadhyay.

Song	Singer
"Aaj Didir Biye"	Kavita Krishnamurthy
"Ei Jibaner Ei Je"	Kavita Krishnamurthy
"Chham Chham Nupur Baje"	Kavita Krishnamurthy, Vijayta Pandit
"Jatoi Karo Bahana" (Duet)	Kavita Krishnamurthy, Kumar Sanu
"Mon Amar Ek"	Kumar Sanu, Vijayta Pandit
"Jotoi Karo" (Solo)	Kumar Sanu
"Sundar Tumi Kato"	Kumar Sanu
"Katlo Kato Samay"	Kumar Sanu
