= Hum Hindustani =

- Directed by: Ram Mukherjee
- Produced by: Sashadhar Mukherjee
- Starring: Sunil Dutt; Asha Parekh; Helen; Joy Mukherjee
- Music by: Usha Khanna
- Release date: 1960
- Country: India
- Language: Hindi

Hum Hindustani (Translation We, the Indians ) is a 1960 Hindi movie produced by Sashadhar Mukherjee and directed by Ram Mukherjee. A remake of the 1952 Bengali film Basu Poribar. The film stars Sunil Dutt, Joy Mukherjee, Asha Parekh, Jagirdar, Helen, Leela Chitnis, Agha, Prem Chopra and Sanjeev Kumar in his debut. The film is about a family who lost everything but didn't leave the path of truth. The music is very good.It has a famous song "Chhodo Kal Ki Baatein" (Let go old stories) sung by Mukesh, with music by Usha Khanna and written by IPTA poet, Prem Dhawan.

The film's music is by Usha Khanna. The film did "above average" business at the box office. Helen said in an interview that she wasn't offered character roles after this film, until later in career and was typecast as a dancer.

== Cast ==
- Sunil Dutt as Sukendra Nath (Suken)
- Joy Mukherjee as Satyendra Nath (Satyen)
- Asha Parekh as Sudha
- Gajanan Jagirdar as Verma
- Helen as Kalpana
- Leela Chitnis as Savitri Nath
- Agha as Anand
- Sanjeev Kumar as Police Inspector
- Hari Shivdasani as Diwan
- Murad (actor) as Judge

== Plot ==
Suken and Satyen are brothers. They were very rich but their father lost everything when his relatives produced fake documents and evidences and took all the properties from him. Suken's marriage with Sudha is cancelled because of their changed fortunes. Satyen's engagement is still intact. Suken works hard and does many things like writing a book titled "Hum Hindustani" which is sold for millions copies, runs an employment agency and participates in stage programs. Satyen works under Mr Verma. One day Mr Verma gives him ten thousand rupees to give to someone. Satyen forgets to lock the almirah and Mr Verma's nephew Shankar steals the money. Meanwhile Suken had gone to pick up Satyen. Satyen is accused of stealing the money and the matter is taken to court. At home, Suken accuses Satyen of stealing and a fist-fight ensues. Satyen then discloses how he has earned all the money. Meanwhile, Anand finds Shankar's diary at the place of the theft and learns about the real thief and gives evidence of the same in court. Shankar tries to foil the brothers' plan to apprehend him and the police arrive in time and arrest him.

== Music ==
All songs composed by Usha Khanna and the lyrics written by Rajinder Krishan, Sahir Ludhianvi, Prem Dhawan and K.Manohar

1. "Neeli Neeli Ghata, O Bhigi Bhigi Hava" - Mukesh, Asha Bhosle - Lyrics : K.Manohar
2. "Raat Nikhari Hui, Zulf Bikhari Hui" - Mukesh - Lyrics : K.Manohar
3. "Chhodo kal Ki Baatein, Kal Ki Baat Puraani" - Mukesh - Lyrics : Prem Dhawan
4. "Hum Jab Chale To Ye Jahaa Jhume" - Mohammed Rafi - Lyrics : Sahir Ludhianvi
5. "Maajhi Meri Qismat Ke Ji Chaahe Jahaan Le Chal" - Lata Mangeshkar - Lyrics : Rajinder Krishan
6. "Chori Chori Tori Aayi Hai Radha" - Lata Mangeshkar
7. "Tu Lage Mora Baalam Ye Kaise Kahu Mai" - Usha Khanna, Geeta Dutt - Lyrics : K.Manohar
8. "Baalamaa Re Haay, Mori Lat Sulajhaa De" - Asha Bhosle
9. "Chhedo Na Mohe Kanha Ja Ja" - Lata Mangeshkar

This film is also remembered for having introduced Sanjeev Kumar.
