= Ram Mukherjee =

Indian film director

Ram Mukerji
- Born: 18 October 1933; Jhansi, British India
- Died: 22 October 2017 (aged 84); Mumbai, Maharashtra, India
- Occupations: Filmmaker; screenwriter
- Spouse: Krishna Mukherjee (m. 1972)
- Children: 2 including Rani Mukherji
- Family: Mukherjee-Samarth family

Ram Mukerji (18 October 1933 – 22 October 2017) was an Indian film director, producer, and screenwriter in Hindi and Bengali cinema. He was one of the founders of Filmalaya Studios, Mumbai. He is most known for his films, Hum Hindustani (1960) and Leader (1964), starring Dilip Kumar and Vyjayanthimala.

He belonged to the Mukerji-Samarth family, as his father Ravindramohan Mukherjee was the elder brother of Sashadhar Mukherjee and one of the founders of Filmalaya Studios. His wife Krishna Mukherjee is a playback singer, his daughter Rani Mukerji is a noted Bollywood actress, and his son is director Raja Mukerji. Raja assisted his father in a few films, before making his acting debut with Bidhatar Khela (2007).

He previously directed and produced his daughter Rani Mukerji's film debut, Biyer Phool in 1996, and produced her Hindi film debut Raja Ki Aayegi Baraat in 1997. Mukerji died on 22 October 2017, four days after his 84th birthday.

== Filmography ==
| Year | Film | Language | Screenplay writer | Director | Producer | Actors | Notes |
|---|---|---|---|---|---|---|---|
| 1960 | Hum Hindustani | Hindi | | Yes | | Sunil Dutt, Asha Parekh, Helen, Joy Mukherjee | |
| 1964 | Leader | Hindi | Yes | Yes | | Dilip Kumar, Vyjayanthimala, Motilal | |
| 1969 | Sambandh | Hindi | | | Yes | Deb Mukherjee, Abhi Bhattacharya, Vijaya Choudhury | |
| 1972 | Ek Bar Mooskura Do | Hindi | | Yes | | Joy Mukherjee, Tanuja, Deb Mukherjee | |
| 1992 | Raktalekha | Bengali | | Yes | | Chiranjeet, Prosenjit, Debashree, Soumitra | |
| 1993 | Tomar Rakte Amar Sohag | Bengali | | Yes | | Chiranjeet, Tapas Paul, Debashree, Sabyasachi | |
| 1994 | Rakta Nadir Dhara | Bengali | | Yes | | Chiranjeet, Prosenjit, Sabyasachi, Debashree | |
| 1996 | Biyer Phool | Bengali | | Yes | | Prosenjit, Rani, Sabyasachi, Indrani | |
