= Bombay Presidency Radio Club =

Indian sports club and radio broadcast station

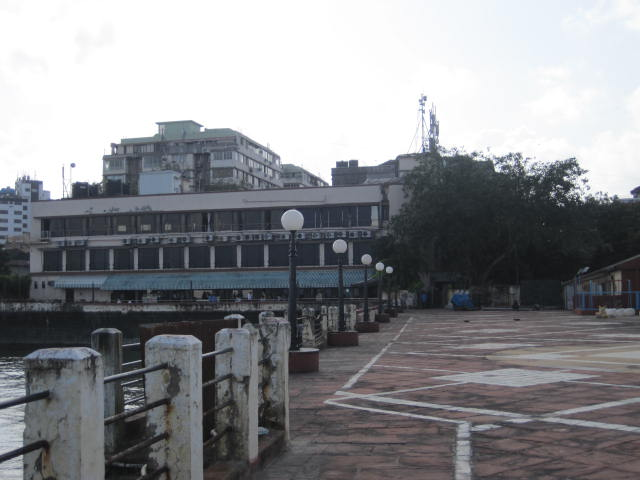
Bombay Presidency Radio Club and pier

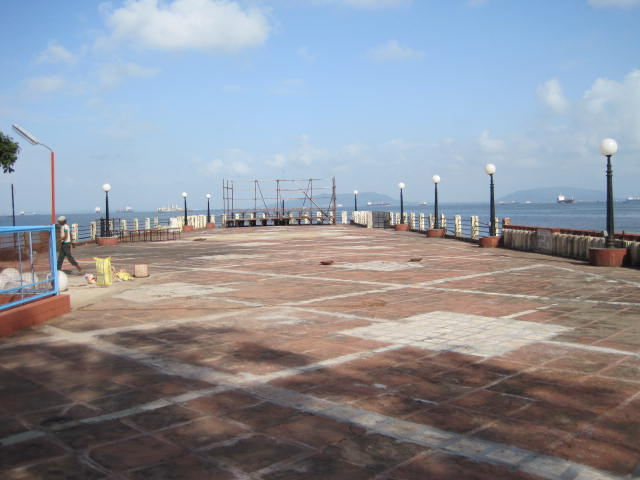
Pier at Bombay Presidency Radio Club as seen from the club

The Bombay Presidency Radio Club (also known as Radio Club) is a sports club located in Colaba, Mumbai. Founded by Giachand Motwane, the first programmed radio broadcast in India was made from here. Until 1927, it was the only operating radio station in Bombay.
