= List of Hindi films of 1937 =

A list of films produced by the Bollywood film industry based in Mumbai in 1937:

== 1937 ==
Some of the notable films of 1937:

Vidyapati was a biopic directed by Nitin Bose for New Theatres. It starred Pahari Sanyal as the Maithili poet and Vaishnava saint Vidyapati. The bold songs of the film ensured crowds at the theatres making it a big success of 1937.

Duniya Na Mane (Marathi:Kunku) was a social film from Prabhat Film Company directed by V. Shantaram. It dealt with the issue of arranged marriage. The film did well in the theatres and according to Baburao Patel of Filmindia it "recorded better returns... than any other picture before".

President was produced by New Theatres and directed by Nitin Bose. A love triangle with a social content it highlighted the plight of mill workers. The music was popular with a classic from Saigal, Ik Bangla Bane Nyaara.

Kisan Kanya made by Ardeshir Irani of Alam Ara (1931) fame was the first colour film to be processed in India. The film however did not do well at the box office due to "a weak story".

Jeevan Prabhat was a successful social film from Bombay Talkies directed by Franz Osten. It starred Kishore Sahu in his debut film with Devika Rani and Mumtaz Ali.

Zambo the Ape Man (1937), directed and produced by Mohan Bhavnani, was India's first Tarzan-inspired film. Starring Navin Yagnik in the titular role, it was described by contemporary film journalist R. A. Shaikh as "the biggest box office draw of 1937". It was followed by a sequel, Zambo Ka Beta (1939).

== A-B ==
Title	Director	Cast	Genre	Notes
Adarsh Mahila		Bashir, Leela Desai, Noorjahan, Tara, Khalil, Aftab, Quiser, Mirza	Social	Ideal Films. Music: Lyrics:
Aflatoon	Pesi Karani	Rose, Khalil	Action	Tollywood Studio. Music: Brijlal Varma; Lyrics:
Anath Ashram	Hemchander Chunder	Umasashi, Najmul Hussain, Prithviraj Kapoor, Trilok Kapoor, Jagdish Sethi, Nawab, Nemo, Manorama Sr., Devbala, Kalyani Das	Social Family Drama	New Theatres Music: R. C. Boral; Lyrics: Kidar Sharma
Asiai Sitara	Haribhai Desai	Master Vithal, Jenabai Pawar, Vasantrao Pehalwan, Dhulia, Krishnaswamy, Veena Devi, Minoo the Mystic, Ibrahim	Action	Music: Master Mohammed; Lyrics: Pandit Anuj
Atma Tarang	F. R. Irani	Sohrab Modi, Prabha Devi, E. Tarapore, Firoz Dastur, Vasant Pahelwan, Gulzar, S. L. Puri	Social	Sunrise Pictures Music: Habib Khan.Lyrics:
Aurat Ki Zindagi	F. R. Irani	Jal Merchant, Zubeida, Rashid, Agha Jani, Mustafa	Social	Sunrise Pictures. Music: S. P. Rame, C. Solanki; Lyrics: Munshi Salim
Badhe Chalo	Mohan Sinha	Radharani, Sarla, Jeevan, Fakir Chand, Badri Prasad, O. K. Dar, Ratanlal Khanjar	Social	Manmohan Pictures. Music: Badri Prasad; Lyrics:
Banke Sipahi	R. N. Vaidya	Bulbule, Manchi Tuthi, Shahjahan, Samson, Baburao, Kesari	Costume Action	Vaidya Productions. Music: Ghulam Mohammed; Lyrics: Munshi Rabil
Begunah	Gajanan Jagirdar	Shahu Modak, Sitara Devi, Baburao Pendharkar, Rajani, Altekar, Panna	Social	Hans Pictures. Music: B. S. Hoogan; Lyrics: Pandit Indra
Bharat Ka Jiwan	M. D. Shah	Ghulam Hussain, Miss Pokhraj, Nurjahan, S. Alam, Putlibai, Patehsingh	Action	Vishwapati. Music: Chimanlal Shah; Lyrics:
Bismil Ki Arzoo	B. S. Hijle	Sardar Akhtar, Ramola, Rafi Ahmed, Mirza, Tarabai	Action	U. P. Cinetone. Music: Lyrics:
Bulldog	Dwarka Khosla	Yusuf Effendi, Indubala, Gope, Ashalata, Ramlal, Devaskar, Kashmiri	Action	Daryani Production. Music: Anil Biswas; Lyrics: G. S. Akhtar

== C-D ==
Title	Director	Cast	Genre	Notes
Calcutta After Midnight	A. R. Kabuli	Ramola, Brijrani, Shiraz, Sitara Devi, Ghulam Qadir, Sher Ali, Zohra Sehgal, A. R. Kabuli	Suspense Drama	Prince Movies. Music: A. R. Kabuli; Lyrics:
Capt. Kirti Kumar	C. M. Luhar	Motilal, Bibbo, Yakub, Krishna Kumari, V. H. Desai, Bhudo Advani Ram Marathe, Sankatha Prasad, Pesi Patel	Action	Sagar Pictures. Music: Bhaskar Rao; Lyrics:
Chabuk Sawar	M. Udwadia	Gohar Karnataki, Amritlal Nagar, Brijmala, Vijay Kumar, Bhim, Nurjahan, Sheelprabha, P. R. Joshi	Action	Jay Bharat. Music: Gohar Karnataki; Lyrics: Gauri Shankarlal Akhtar
Challenge	Balwant Bhatt	Lalita Pawar, Jayant, Rajkumari, Shirin, Lallubhai, Gulab, Jahangir, M. Zahur, Ismail	Action	Prakash Pictures. Music: Lallubhai Nayak; Lyrics: Pandit Anuj
Chevrolet 1936	G. P. Pawar	Lalita Pawar, Madhav Kale, Bhagwan, Varne, B. Sohni, V. Mehta	Action	Purnima Pictures. Music: K. Yagnik; Lyrics:
Danger Signal	K. Amarnath	Kumar, Nazir, Lalita, Masiah, Takle	Action	Mohan Pictures. Music: Annasaheb Mainkar; Lyrics:
Daulat	S. M. Yusuf	Harishchandra, Chandrarao Kadam, Mehar Sultana, Shah Nawaz, Usha Rani, Khatoon, Agha, Brijmala, S. M. Sadiq, Usha Rani	Social	Harishchandra Art Production. Music: Mukherji; Lyrics: Wahid Qureshi
Dhanwan	Premankur Atorthy	Rattanbai, W. M. Khan, Jamshedji, Hafizji	Social	Imperial Pictures. Music: H. C. Bali; Lyrics:
Dharamaveer	Master Vinayak	Indira Wadkar, Master Vinayak, Ratnaprabha, Baburao Pendharkar, Javdekar, Datar	Social	Huns Pictures. Based loosely on Henrik Ibsen play: Samfundets Stotter. Music: Annasaheb Mainkar; Lyrics:
Dil Faroshi	D. N. Madhok	Ishwarlal, Khatoon, Charlie, Malti, Ram Apte, Dilip	Action	Ranjit Studios. Music: Banne Khan; Lyrics: D. N. Madhok
Do Auratein a.k.a. Two Women	Moti Gidwani	Padma Devi, Rose, Rafique Ghaznavi, Ghulam Mohammed, Baba Vyas, Sayed Ahmed, Laxmi	Social	Music: H. C. Bali; Lyrics:
Dukhiyari	Manibhai Vyas	Kokila, Madhukar Gupte, Firoza Begum, Devaskar, Amirbai Karnataki, S. Nazir	Social	Daryani Productions. Music: Anil Biswas, Master Madhavlal Damodar; Lyrics: G. S. Akhtar
Duniya Na Mane	V. Shantaram	Shanta Apte, Raja Nene, Vasanti, Shakuntala Paranjpye, Keshavrao Date, Vimla Vashishta, Master Chhotu, Karmarkar, Gauri	Social Drama	Prabhat Film Company Music: Keshavrao Bhole; Lyrics: Munshi Aziz

== F-I ==
Title	Director	Cast	Genre	Notes
Fakhr-E-Islam	Nanubhai Vakil, Safdar Mirza	Khatoon, Gulam Sabir, Patience Cooper, Rashida, Indu, Nurjahan	Costume	Indira Movies. Music: Lyrics:
Gangavataran	Dada Phalke	Shanta Hublikar, Barchi Bahadur, Chitnis, Deshpande, Suresh, Bhagwat, Shankarrao Bhosle, Kusum Despande, Dongre, Ahmed Khan, Anusuya, Ibrahim	Devotional	Kolhapur Cinetone. Music: Phalke, Vishwanathbua Jadhav; Lyrics:
Gentleman Daku	Ram Daryani	Leela Chitnis, Yusuf Effendi, Gope, Kokila, Ramlal, Amirbai Karnataki, Majid, Manek, Omkar	Action	Daryani Productions. Music: Anil Biswas; Lyrics: M. R. Kapoor
Gulbadan	K. Rathod	Mehar Sultana, Ashiq Hussain, Bulbule, Himmatlal, Ansuya, Gulab, Kantilal, Fazlu, Samson, Miss Pokhraj	Legend	Vishnu Cine. Music: K. Panchigar; Lyrics: Kabil Amritsari
Guru Ghantal	Kikubhai Desai		Costume Action	Music: Lyrics:
His Highness	Balwant Bhatt	Sardar Akhtar, Jayant, Shirin, Umakant, M. ahur, Lallubhai, Jahangir, Gulab, Ismail	Action	Prakash Pictures. Music: Shankar Rao, Lallubhai; Lyrics:
Hurricane Hansa	R. N. Vaidya	Fearless Nadia, John Cawas, Sardar Mansur, Master Mohammed, Boman Shroff, Dalpat, Sayani Atish, Husn Banu, Master Chotu, Minoo Cooper	Action	Wadia Movietone. Music: Master Mohammed; Lyrics:
Iman Farosh	B. S. Rajhans	Khursheed, Zebunissa, Prabhashankar, Bibijan, Balabhai, Shakir	Action	Music: Mir Sahib; Lyrics: Zia Sarhadi
Insaaf	J. P. Advani	Yusuf Effendi, Leela Chitnis, Ashalata, Gope, Indurani, Kashmiri, Omkar Devaskar, Prem Kumari, Amirbai Karnataki, Ramlal	Social	Daryani Production. Music: Anil Biswas; Lyrics: G. S. Akhtar
Izzat	Franz Osten	Ashok Kumar, Devika Rani, Mumtaz Ali, Vimla Kumari, Kamta Prasad, Manohar Ghatwal, P. F. Pithawala, M. Nazir, Amir Ali	Costume Drama	Bombay Talkies Music: Saraswati Devi; Lyrics: J. S. Kashyap

== J-K ==
Title	Director	Cast	Genre	Notes
Jagat Kesari	Homi Master	Dinshaw Billimoria, Sulochana, Ruby Myers, Ghulam Mohammed, Ghulam Rasool, Lakshmi, Jilloobai, Jumuna Sr, Jamshedji, Sayed Ahmed	Costume	Imperial Film Company. Music: Jamshedji, Khan Sahib; Lyrics:
Jagirdar	Mehboob Khan	Motilal, Surendra, Bibbo, Yakub, Maya Devi, Ram Marathe, Bhudo Advani, Pesi Patel, Zia Sarhadi, Sankatha Prasad	Social	Sagar Pictures. Music: Anil Biswas; Lyrics: Zia Sarhadi
Jawahir-e-Hind	Chunilal Parekh	K. G. Rao, Rama Sashi, Sultan Alam, Nurjahan, Tarabai	Social	N. I. Movietone. Music: Shanti Kumar; Lyrics: Munshi Asif
Jeevan Prabhat	Franz Osten	Devika Rani, Renuka Devi, Maya Devi, Kishore Sahu, Mumtaz Ali, Vimla Devi, Chandraprabha, Tarabai, Saroj Borkar, Kamta Prasad, P. F. Pithawala	Social Family Drama	Bombay Talkies Music: Saraswati Devi; Lyrics: J. S. Kashyap
Jeevan Jyoti	M. R. Kapoor	Urmila Devi, R. L. Monge, Shakuntala Devi, Ghulam Qadir, Sunalini Devi, Gulzar, Firoza Begum, Gobind Ram	Social	Mohini Films. Music: Gobind Ram; Lyrics: Wali Saheb
Jeevan Swapna	Jaddanbai	Mehtab, Sitara Devi, A. Hussain, Marutirao, Shanta Devi, Anees Khatoon	Social	Sangeet Film Company. Music: Jaddanbai; Lyrics: Pyare Lal Santoshi
Kal Ki Baat	R. S. Choudhry	Rose, Surendra, Zebunissa, Durga Khote Jani Babu, Shakir, Mubarak, Bibijan	Costume	Music: Mir Sahib; Lyrics: Zia Sarhadi, N. P. Betaab
Kala Bhoot	A. M. Khan	Navinchandra, Rajkumari, Gohar Karnataki, Bose, Bashir, Sofia, Razak, Ali	Costume Suspense	Indian Liberty. Music: Damodar Sharma; Lyrics: A. M. Khan
Khan Bahadur	Sohrab Modi	Sohrab Modi, Naseem Banu, Prem Adib, E. Tarapore, Sharifa, Sadiq Ali, Sheela,	Social	Minerva Movietone. Music: B. S. Hoogan; Lyrics:
Khudai Khidmatgar	Vithaldas Panchotia	Mazhar Khan, Rampyari, Khalil, V. Panchotia, Radharani, Shyam Sunder, Sarla Devi, A. R. Pehalwan, Fida Hussain, Jaishankar Pehalwan,	Action	Bharat Laxmi Pictures. Music: Nagardas Nayak; Lyrics: Tanveer Naqvi
Khwab Ki Duniya	Vijay Bhatt	Sardar Akhtar, Jayant, Shirin Banu, Madhav Marathe, Umakant, Zahur, Ismail, Lallubhai	Fantasy	Prakash Pictures. Music: Lallubhai Naik; Lyrics: Pandit Anuj
Kisan Kanya	M. Gidwani	Padma Devi, Ghulam Mohammed, Sayed Ahmed, Jilloobai, Nissar, Gani	Social	Imperial Pictures. First colour film processed in India (Sairandhari (1933) was processed in Germany) Music: Lyrics:
Kiski Pyari a.k.a. Whose Love?	Akhtar Nawaz	Jal Merchant, Zubeida, Premlata, Khalil, Ghulam Hussain, Noor Jehan, Akhtar Nawaz, Anees Khatoon, Aghajan, Bittanbai	Social	Sunrise Pictures. Music: Lyrics:
Kokila	Sarvottam Badami	Motilal, Shobhana Samarth, Sitara Devi, Sabita Devi, Maya Bannerji, Kayam Ali, Sankatha Prasad, Siddiqi	Social	Sagar Movietone. Music: Anil Biswas; Lyrics: Siddiqi
Kuldeepak	A. M. Khan	Shiraz, Gohar Karnataki, F. M. Khan, Garib Shah, Rafique Ghaznavi, Anwaribai, Almas, Bibijan	Social Family Drama	Mohan Pictures. Music: Lyrics:
Kulvadhu	Sarvottam Badami	Motilal, Sabita Devi, Gulzar, Pesi Patel, Pande, Jamu Patel	Social	Sagar Pictures. Music: Pransukh M. Nayak; Lyrics: Siddiqui

== L-M ==
Title	Director	Cast	Genre	Notes
Lahiri Lutera	Nagendra Majumdar	Navinchandra, Vatsala Kumtekar, Uma Devi, Marutirao, Amritlal Nagar, Sofia, Roshan, Bhim, Bose	Action	Navin Pictures. Music: Damodar Sharma; Lyrics: Khalil
Mahageet	Hiren Bose	Surendra, Maya Bannerjee, Sitara Devi, Sankatha Prasad, Pesi Patel, Hiren Bose, Ashalata, Kayam Ali, Kashmiri, Bhudo Advani, Gulzar, Siddiqui	Social Romantic Musical	Sagar Movietone. Music: Anil Biswas; Lyrics: Zia Sarhadi
Mandir	Abdul Rashid Kardar	Dhiraj Bhattacharya, Rajkumari, Anees Khatoon, A. R. Pahelwan, Agha, Mahmood Shah, Akhtar Nawaz	Devotional	Shankar Talkies Corporation. Music: Ramzan Khan; Lyrics: Manjar Hashiri
Mere Lal	Gunjal	Pramila, Anant Marathe, Ram Marathe, W. M. Khan, Rafiqe Ghaznavi, Jamshedji, Jilloobai, Mukhtar, Ghulam Rasool, Sayed Ahmed, Rustom Poonawala	Social	Imperial Pictures. Music: H. C. Bali, Ram Gopal Pande; Lyrics: Kabil Amritsari
Meri Bhool	Shaily Ghosh	Navin Yagnik, Indurani, Paresh Bannerjee, Kokila, Shivrani, Nayampalli, Leela Pawar	Social	Tara Films. Music: Shivrani Ghosh; Lyrics: Pandit Indra
Milap	Abdul Rashid Kardar	Prithviraj Kapoor, Mazhar Khan, Indira Devi, Yakub, Bimla Kumari, Devbala, Ram Pyari, M. Esmail	Costume	Moti Mahal Theatres. Music: K. C. Dey; Lyrics:
Mitti Ka Putla	Jayant Desai	Madhuri, E. Billimoria, Charlie, Ishwarlal, Anees Khatoon, Ghory, Bhupatrai, Keki Bawa, Shanta Devi		Music: Lyrics:
Modern Lady	Jyotish Mukherjee	Ram Dulari, Mohammed Hussain, Chandra, Hashmat	Action	Kali Films. Music: Lyrics:
Modern Youth	D. T. Shivdasani	Navin Yagnik, Hansa Wadkar, Benjamin, Sarla, S Nasir, Dina Nath	Action	Golden Eagle. Music: Sundardas Bhatia; Lyrics: Gauri Shankar Lal 'Akhtar'
Moti Ka Haar	Jaddanbai	Mehtab, Ashiq Hussain, Anita Devi, Baby Nargis, Shamlal, P. L. Santoshi	Social	Sangeet Movietone. Music: Jaddanbai; Lyrics:
Mr. 420	Sorabji Kerawala	Indubala, Akbar, Manjar, Sorabji Kerawala, Abdulla, Anwaribai, Nurjahan	Action	Star Films. Music: Chhailaram Solanki; Lyrics:
Mukti	P.C. Barua	P. C. Barua, Kanan Devi, Nawab, Menaka Devi, Sailen Chowdhary, Jadish Sethi, Pankaj Mullick, Bikram Kapoor, Prafulla Roy, Devbala, Amar Mullick	Social Family Drama	New Theatres. Music: Pankaj Mullick; Lyrics: Arzu Lucknavi

== N-P ==
Title	Director	Cast	Genre	Notes
Naujawan	Aspi Irani	Husn Banu, Gulshan, Harishchandra Rao, Miya Allavally, Minoo The Mystic	Action	Wadia Movietone. Music: Master Mohammed; Lyrics:
New Searchlight	Homi Master	D. Billimoria, Jilloobai, Sulochana, Jamshedji, Ghulam Mohammed, Rustom Poonawala, Ghulam Rasool	Social	Imperial Music: Hakim Shahid, Munshi Shahid; Lyrics:
Nishan-e-Jung	A. R. Kabuli	Zebunissa, Abdul Rehman Kabuli, Shiraz Moti, S. Alam, Haroon, Gulab	Action	Prince Movies. Music: Lyrics:
Parakh	Baburao Apte	Indira Wadkar, Rajkumari, Madhav Kale, Baby Noor Jehan, Nurjahan, M. Ghatwai	Action	Dwarka Pictures. Music: B. S. Hoogan; Lyrics:
Pardesi Pankhi	Chandulal Shah	E. Billimoria, Gohar Mamajiwala, Shanta, Ishwarlal, Khatoon, Dixit, Charlie, Ghory, Bhupatrai	Action	Ranjit Pictures. Music: Bannekhan; Lyrics: Narayan Prasad Betaab
Pratibha	Baburao Painter	Durga Khote, Keshavrao Date, Raja Paranjpe, Hirabai Barodekar, Vishnupant, Aundhkar, V. S. Jog, Master Shyam, Miss Heera, S. D. Danve	Costume Drama	Shalini Cinetone. Music: Govindrao Tembe; Lyrics: Pandit Anand Kumar
Prem Kahani	Franz Osten	Ashok Kumar, Madhurika, Maya Devi, Mumtaz Ali, Vimala Devi, N. M. Joshi, P. F. Pithawala, Saroj Borkar, Manohar Ghatwani, Chandraprabha, Kamta Prasad	Social	Bombay Talkies. Music: Saraswati Devi; Lyrics: J. S. Kashyap
Prem Yatra	Prafulla Roy	Khursheed, Wasti, Mayuri, Leelavati, Rafique Ghaznavi, Mubarak, Mirza Musharraf, Vidya Devi	Social	New Orient. Music: Q. S. Zahoor; Lyrics: Hakim Ahmad Shuja
Premveer	Master Vinayak	Vinayak, Ashalata, D. S. Salvi, Pethkar, Gharpure, Kashmiri, Phiroze, B. Pawar	Romantic Comedy	Huns Pictures. Music: Annashib Mainkar; Lyrics: Pandit Indra
President	Nitin Bose	K. L. Saigal, Leela Desai, Kamlesh Kumari, Jagdish Sethi, Bikram Kapoor, Devbala, Nawab	Social	New Theatres. Ek Bangla Bane Niyaara. Music: Pankaj Mullick, R. C. Boral; Lyrics:
Punjab Lancers	Homi Master, Narayan Devare	Fatma Begum, Laxmi, Urmila, Kanta, Ghulam Rasool, Master Nissar, Kapi, Ebrahim, Sayed Ahmed, Chemist, Asooji, Master Madhavlal Damodar	Action	Imperial Film Company Music: Master Madhavlal; Lyrics:

== Q-S ==
Title	Director	Cast	Genre	Notes
Qazzak Ki Ladki	Sultan Mirza	Surendra, Bibbo, Dattu, D. P. Rai, Verman, Iftekhar, Sushila, Sarla, Sadiqe, Kashmiri, Mirza Musharraf	Costume	Rainbow Films. Music: Ishrat Sultana; Lyrics: Dr. Samad
Sagar Ka Sher	Yakub	Yakub, Bibbo, Ram Marathe, Kayam Ali, David, Sankatha Prasad, Pesi Patel, Mehdi Raja, Zaverbhai, Pande		Sagar Pictures. Music: Pransukh Nayak; Lyrics: Waqif
Samaj Patan	Prafulla Roy	Ahindra Choudhury, Indubala, R. P. Kapoor, Devbala, D. Sarkari	Social	Bharat Lakshmi. Music: Nagardas Naik; Lyrics:
Saqi	J. P. Advani	P. Jairaj, Khursheed, Kashinath, Kamalakar, Jena, Hari Shivdasani	Action	Variety Pictures. Music: Sunderdas Bhatia; Lyrics: Munshi Jilani Sham
Sarojini	T. G. Lalwani	Rajkumari, Mubarak, Moti, Nurjahan, Zohra Sehgal, Fatty Prasad, Hamida Banu	Social	Vinset Pictures. Music: Anil Biswas; Lyrics: M. R. Kapoor
Sati Pingala	D. K. Kale	Indira Wadkar, Kusum Deshpande, Kelkar, Raja Pandit, Pathak	Devotional	Music: R. S. Pathak; Lyrics: Pandit Indra
Savitri	Franz Osten	Ashok Kumar, Devika Rani, Mumtaz Ali, Sunita Devi, Maya Devi, Kamta Prasad, Saroj Borkar, M. Nazir, Susheela, Tarabai, Chandraprabha, P. F. Pithawala	Mythology Legend	Bombay Talkies. Music: Saraswati Devi; Lyrics: J. S. Kashyap
Shadi Ka Mamla	Mamam Warerkar	Hansa Wadkar, Baburao Pendharkar, Master Chhotu	Social	M. Thakker. Music: Lyrics:
Shama Parwana	D. N. Madhok	Ishwarlal, Madhuri, Bhupat Rai, Dixit, Charlie, Usharani, Kesari, Dilip (Nazir)	Social	Ranjit Movietone Music: Banne Khan; Lyrics: Zia Sarhadi
Sharafi Loot	D. N. Madhok	Ishwarlal, Khatoon, Ghory, Charlie, Dixit, Ram Apte, Bhupatrai	Action	Ranjit Movietone. Music: Rewashankar; Lyrics: D. N. madhok
Sinhaldweep Ki Sundari	Kikubhai Desai	Sardar Mansur, Navinchandra, Ali, Mirajkar, Meharunnisa, Bacha, Gohar Karnataki, Shahzadi, Ali	Action	Indian Liberty. Music: Damodar Sharma; Lyrics:
Swaraj Ke Sipahi	Mohan Singh	Radharani, Snehlata, O. K. Dhar, Shyam Sunder, Fakir Mohammed, Jeevan, Munshi Khanjar	Action	Murli Pictures. Music: Badri Prasad; Lyrics:

== T-Z ==
Title	Director	Cast	Genre	Notes
Taranhar	Kikubhai Desai	Gohar Karnataki, Ibrahim, Bachcha, Nurjahan, Mansur, Mehrunisa, Ali, Bose	Action	Indian Liberty. Music: Damodar Sharma; Lyrics:
Toofani Tarzan	Homi Wadia	Gulshan, John Cawas, Nazira, Boman Shroff, Dalpat, Dilawar, Chandrashekhar	Action Adventure	Wadia Movietone Music: Master Mohammed; Lyrics: Pandit Gyan Chandra
Toofani Khazana	G. K. Mehta	P. Jairaj, Urmila Devi, Shah Nawaz, Gulab, Dinkar, Yusuf, Bahi Desa, Aspi	Action	Firdausi Pics. Music: Lyrics:
Toofani Toli a.k.a. Reckless Rogues	Jayant Desai	E. Billimoria, Madhuri, Ishwarlal, Dixit, Ghory, Anees Khatoon, Waheedan Bai, Ram Apte, Shahjahan, Kalyani Das, Bhupatrai, Kantilal	Action	Ranjit Film Co. Music: (Jnan Dutt) Gyan Dutt; Lyrics: Pyare Lal Santoshi
Usne Kya Socha	I. S. Hafisji	Ratanbai, W. M. Khan, Rafique Ghaznavi, Anant Marathe, Baby Suraiya, Rustom Poonawala, Jamshedji, Mukhtar, Asooji	Social	Imperial Film Company. Music: H. C. Bali; Lyrics:
Vanraj Kesari	Dhirubhai Desai	Ansuya, Ashiq Hussain, Bulbule, Kantilal, Himmatlal, Aruna Devi, P. R. Joshi, Fazlu, Samson	Costume	Vishnu Cinetone. Music: Ali Hasan Javed; Lyrics:
Vidyapati	Debaki Bose	Leela Desai Prithviraj Kapoor, Pahari Sanyal, Kanan Devi, K. N. Singh, Rampyari, Chhaya Devi, K. C. Dey, Nemo, Kidar Sharma, Mohammed Ishaq	Biopic Drama	New Theatres. Music: R. C. Boral; Lyrics: Kidar Sharma
Wahan	K. N. Kale	Leela Chitnis, Chandra Mohan, Shanta Apte, Prahlad, Vasant Desai, Ulhas, Aruna Devi, Master Chhotu	Costume	Prabhat Film Company. Music: Master Krishnarao; Lyrics: Pt. Narottam Vyas
Wah Ri Duniya	Gunjal	Sulochana (Ruby Myers), D. Billimoria, Ghulam Mohammed, Lakshmi, Asooji, Sayed Ahmed, Jumna, Baba Vyas	Action	Music: Lyrics:
Zambo the Ape Man	M. Bhavnani	Navin Yagnik, Sarla, Indira Wadkar, Salvi, Ghulam Qadir, Charlie, D. S. Salvi, David, Nayampalli	Action	Bhavnani Productions. Music: Badri Prasad; Lyrics: Badri Prasad
Zamin Ka Chand	Jayant Desai	Madhuri, E. Billimoria, Ishwarlal, Ghory, Bhupatrai, Dixit, Ram Apte	Social	Ranjit Pictures. Music: Banne Khan; Lyrics: Arzu Lucknavi
