= Navin Yagnik =

Indian actor and producer (1913–1955)

- Yagnik c. mid-1940s
- Born: 1913; Calcutta, British India
- Died: October 1955 (aged 42)
- Occupations: Actor; film producer
- Years active: 1930–1955
- Known for: Jagran (1936); Zambo the Ape Man (1937); Talaq (1938)

Navin Yagnik (1913–1955) was an Indian actor and film producer who worked in Hindi cinema. His notable leading roles include those in the dramas Jagran (1936) and Talaq (1938), as well as Tarzan in the jungle adventure film Zambo the Ape Man (1937), the first Tarzan film made in India. Author Ashok Raj describes him as "one of the most versatile second-rung artistes during the 1930s and 1940s".

He later served as the president of Junior Cine Artists Association till his death in 1955, aged 42.

== Early life ==
Yagnik was born in Calcutta in 1913, to a father from the United Provinces and a Bengali mother. He did not complete his matriculation, but was reportedly an accomplished sportsman and public speaker during his school years.

== Career ==
=== Early years (1930–1934) ===
Yagnik aspired to become a film actor while still at school, although his parents initially disapproved of his ambition. He moved to Bombay and joined Sagar Movietone as an extra in 1930. Initially unpaid, he eventually received a monthly salary of ₹35.

=== Established actor (1935–1945) ===
After a year, he left Sagar Movietone and shifted to Ajanta Cinetone, where after a few small parts, he played the leading role in A. P. Kapoor's romantic comedy Pyar Ki Maar (1935). Journalist R. A. Shaikh described his performance as "excellent". Yagnik also appeared in Golden Eagle Movietone's Modern Youth and Mysterious Man.

Yagnik starred in the titular role in Bhavnani's Zambo the Ape Man (1937), India's first Tarzan-inspired film

From 1935 to 1937, Yagnik worked with filmmaker Mohan Bhavnani's production house. He played Narayan, a young man struggling with unemployment, in Bhavnani's melodrama Jagran (1936; aka Awakening). Baburao Patel of Filmindia described him as "good at places". The following year, he starred as Tarzan in the first Tarzan film made in India — Zambo the Ape Man (1937). It proved to be the biggest box office success of the year. Yagnik subsequently briefly joined Sohrab Modi's Minerva Movietone. In Talaq (1938; aka Divorce), a Modi "psychodrama condemning the divorce law as iniquitous to Hinduism", Yagnik played Niranjan, a politician who is deserted by his feminist wife.

Yagnik became a freelancer in 1938. He reunited with Bhavnani to play the lead role in Zambo's sequel, Zambo Ka Beta (1939), which opened to a favorable critical reception. Critic Khwaja Ahmad Abbas wrote: "Navin Yagnik ... plays his role with a certain amount of gay abandon and it is difficult to imagine he is the same man who played the mild conservative in Divorce".

Yagnik subsequently appeared as Bibbo's son in J. P. Advani's melodrama Sneh Bandhan (1940), and also in Gajanan Jagirdar's Main Hari (1940), which co-starred opposite Naseem Banu as his love interest. The film was inspired by the novel The Lady of the Camellias (1848). A reviewer for Dipali was unenthusiastic about his performance, noting that he "imparts so much of the now famous Zambo-type of acting in his fisherman's role".

Yagnik and Khurshid Jr. in a scene from Zameen (1943)

During the early 1940s, Yagnik had supporting roles in the high-profile productions Raja Rani (1942), Vasantsena (1942), Prithvi Vallabh (1943), Tasveer (1943), and Chal Chal Re Naujawan (1944). In Modi's Prithvi Vallabh, he portrayed the Chalukya emperor Satyashraya in a fictionalised account. Yagnik's romantic subplot with Khurshid Jr. in the peasant drama Zameen (1943) was deemed unnecessary in a Bombay Chronicle review.

=== Later career and activism (1946 and beyond) ===
Following his work on Insaaf (1946), Yagnik fell ill, though he remained active in the film industry till his final years. In 1946, he was elected to the executive committee of the Film Artistes' Association of India, alongside figures such as Prithviraj Kapoor and Mehtab Modi.

In partnership with Kashmir Films, Yagnik became a film producer with Ahinsa (1947) and Chobeji (1949). He also acted in the former; a review by Baburao Patel noted, "Navin Yagnik–one of our most sincere and politically progressive artistes–tries to put some spirit in the role of the terrorist."

In the early 1950s, Yagnik served as the president of Junior Cine Artists Association, where he worked on improving work conditions of junior actors and extras.

== Death ==
Yagnik died after prolonged illness in October 1955, aged 42. Mourning his "untimely death", V. P. Sathe of Swatantra wrote that the junior artistes had been deprived of a capable leader.

== Selected filmography ==
=== As an actor ===
- Pyar Ki Maar (1935)
- Dilawar (1936)
- Jagran (1936) as Narayan
- Meri Bhool (1937)
- Modern Youth (1937)
- Zambo the Ape Man (1937) as Tarzan
- Talaq (1938) as Niranjan
- Vasanti (1938)
- Zambo Ka Beta (1939)
- Jhuthi Sharm (1940)
- Main Hari (1940)
- Sneh Bandhan (1940) as Kamal
- Safed Sawar (1941)
- Suhana Geet (1941)
- Raja Rani (1942)
- Vasantsena (1942)
- Prithvi Vallabh (1943) as Satyashray
- Tasveer (1943)
- Zameen (1943)
- Chal Chal Re Naujawan (1944)
- Insaaf (1946)
- Ahinsa (1947) as the terrorist

=== As producer ===
Yagnik was credited as producer in two films:

- Ahinsa (1947)
- Chobeji (1949)

== Public image ==
Actor Balraj Sahni wrote in his autobiography:

"Navin had a broad, flat face, which at first did not produce a very favourable impression on me ... However, when he smiled, dimples appeared in his cheeks a la Clark Gable, which made his face very attractive indeed. Moreover, I was deeply impressed by his serious demeanour ... [I]n the few years he was associated with films, he did a lot of good work. He organised the 'extras' and studio workers and founded their union. He was an indefatigable fighter for their rights."

Actress and co-star Hansa Wadkar described Yagnik as "a young handsome actor from Uttar Pradesh". She also recalled in her autobiography that Yagnik developed romantic feelings for her while they were filming Air Mail in Karachi. He reportedly expressed a desire to marry her, but was heartbroken after learning that she was already engaged to Jagannath Bandarkar.
