= Zambo Ka Beta =

- Directed by: Mohan Bhavnani
- Produced by: Mohan Bhavnani
- Starring: Navin Yagnik; Bimla Kumari
- Music by: Pandit Badriprasad
- Release date: 1 September 1939
- Country: India
- Language: Hindi

Zambo Ka Beta, also known as Son of Zambo, is a 1939 Indian Hindi-language film directed and produced by Mohan Bhavnani. The film stars Navin Yagnik and Bimla Kumari, along with Nayampally, Sunita Devi, Vatsala Kumtekar, and Fatty Prasad. The film is a sequel of Bhavnani's 1937 hit Zambo the Ape Man, which also starred Yagnik.

It was one of the three Bhavnani films, alongside Navjeevan (1935) and Jagran (1936), whose music was orchestrated by Walter Kaufmann. The film's soundtrack is credited to Pandit Badriprasad.

Zambo Ka Beta premiered at Capitol Theatre, Bombay, on 1 September 1939. Critic K. A. Abbas wrote in The Bombay Chronicle: "Son of Zambo will appeal to children and the comparatively unsophisticated audiences and most probably will have a good run in the smaller towns. From a man who dared to make The Mill, however, one expects something better in future."

== Plot ==
Lured to Bombay by a singing siren, the grown up son of Zambo (Navin Yagnik) experiences life in the city and visits a carnival featuring scenes from the "Have-A-Heart Fete". While in the city, he falls in love with a dancing girl named Sarla (Bimla Kumari), but a rivalry with a "strong man" prompts him to abruptly disappear and return to the jungle.

A scientist (Nayampally) searching for an herb to cure leprosy travels to the jungle where Zambo lives in a bamboo cottage, accompanied by Sarla. Along the way, they cross paths with a Raja who pursues Sarla while the Raja's wife becomes enamored with the son of Zambo.

Later, a high priest performs rituals and drums while demanding a human sacrifice, resulting in Sarla and her companions being bound to cross-shaped stakes. The son of Zambo arrives with his animal allies to rescue them, after which Sarla decides to remain with him in the jungle.

== Cast ==
- Navin Yagnik as the son of Zambo
- Bimla Kumari as Sarla
- Nayampally as the scientist
- Sunita Devi
- Vatsala Kumtekar
- Fatty Prasad
