= Mian Ehsan-ul-Haq =

Pakistani film director and producer (1905–1982)

- Born: Ehsan-ul-Haq; 1915; Delhi, British India
- Died: 3 March 1982 (aged 66–67); Lahore, Pakistan
- Other name: Mian Ehsan
- Occupations: Director; Architecter; Producer
- Years active: 1942–1982
- Spouse: Naseem Banu
- Children: Saira Banu (daughter); Sultan Ahmed (son)
- Relatives: Chamiyan Bai (mother-in-law); Dilip Kumar (son-in-law); Sayyeshaa (great-granddaughter)

Mian Ehsan-ul-Haq (1915 – 3 March 1982) was an Indian and Pakistani film producer and a qualified architect who was best known for his work in the Hindi and Urdu film industries. He was the founder of Taj Mahal Productions and the father of the prominent Indian actress Saira Banu.

== Early life and education ==
Mian Ehsan-ul-Haq was born in British India. He pursued higher education in London, where he qualified as an architect. He was a childhood friend of Naseem Banu, who would later become a famous actress and eventually his wife.

== Career ==
Despite his qualification in architecture, for which he was educated in London, Ehsan-ul-Haq's professional life was predominantly focused on the film industry. After marrying Naseem Banu, Ehsan-ul-Haq entered the film industry and, with his wife, established their own production company, Taj Mahal Productions (also known as Taj Mahal Pictures). They produced several films under this banner in British India, including Ujala (1942), Begum (1945), and Mulaqat (1947). He also took on directing roles for some films, notably Chandni Raat (1949).

After the 1947 Partition of India, Ehsan-ul-Haq chose to migrate to and settle in the newly formed Pakistan. He continued his production career there, where he produced the film Waada, and is also noted for producing Mukhra (1958) and Mahal (1968). To leverage his wife's existing stardom in the new country, he took the negatives of their earlier films and released them in Pakistan.

== Personal life ==
Mian Ehsan-ul-Haq was married to actress Naseem Banu. The couple had two children: a daughter, Saira Banu, who became a leading Hindi film actress, and a son, Sultan Ahmed.

The Partition created a permanent physical separation for the family. Ehsan-ul-Haq's decision to settle in Pakistan, while Naseem Banu remained in India with their children, led to the end of their marriage.

== Death ==
He died in Lahore at Pakistan on 3 March 1982.

== Filmography ==
=== as a director ===
Year	Film	Language
1949	Chandni Raat	Hindi

=== as a producer ===
Year	Film	Language
1942	Ujala	Hindi
1945	Begum	Hindi
1945	Phool	Hindi
1947	Mulaqat	Hindi
1952	Ajeeb Larki	Hindi
1957	Waada	Urdu
1958	Mukhra	Urdu
1966	Insaan	Urdu
1968	Mahal	Urdu
