= Jagran (film) =

- Directed by: Mohan Bhavnani
- Written by: Narottam Vyas
- Starring: Navin Yagnik; Enakshi Rama Rao
- Music by: S. P. Mukherji; Walter Kaufmann
- Release date: 1936
- Country: India
- Language: Hindi

Jagran, also released as Awakening, is a 1936 Indian Hindi-language film directed and produced by Mohan Bhavnani. A sequel of Bhavnani's Mazdoor (1934), it is a melodrama based on the issue of unemployment among Indian youth. The film stars Navin Yagnik and Enakshi Rama Rao. Its music was composed by S. P. Mukerji, while Walter Kaufmann was also credited with "orchestrating" the music.

Critic Baburao Patel noted in Filmindia's December 1936 issue: "The theme of the story is quite interesting and some of the situations would have been very appealing and effective, had they been developed well by the writer. The dialogues of the story are too bad, being more literary than colloquial ... At best, they are just too impotent to appeal. A good subject therefore suffers unnecessarily."

Critic Umapati Verma also reviewed the film for The Hindustan Times on 25 January 1937.

In 1937, The Moving Picture Monthly reported, "Bhavnani's Awakening seems to be the craze of picturegoers at Lucknow — it has really smashed "runs" records over there after a very, very long time".

== Plot ==
Focusing on the issue of unemployment, the story contrasts a blackmailer named Rasik (Nayampalli) with Professor Ramanand, who establishes an ashram for the unemployed. Much of the plot follows Narayan (Navin Yagnik) and Kokila (Enakshi Rama Rao) enduring hardship and hunger before reuniting at the ashram.

== Cast ==
- Navin Yagnik as Narayan
- Enakshi Rama Rao as Kokila
- Prabha
- Nayampally as Rasik
- Narottam Vyas
- S. L. Puri
- Shivrani

== Production ==
Written by Premchand's admirer Narottam Vyas, the film's title references Premchand's 1934–35 period journal Jagran.

The film was shot at Wadia Movietone studio.
