= Talaq (1938 film) =

- Directed by: Sohrab Modi
- Written by: Anand Kumar; Gajanan Jagirdar
- Produced by: Minerva Movietone
- Starring: Naseem Banu; Prem Adib; Gajanan Jagirdar; Navin Yagnik
- Music by: Mir Saheb; Anand Kumar (lyrics)
- Production company: Minerva Movietone
- Release date: 1938
- Running time: 127 minutes
- Country: India
- Language: Hindi-Urdu

Talaq (lit. 'Divorce') is a 1938 Indian social melodrama film directed by Sohrab Modi for Minerva Movietone. The story was written by Anand Kumar and Gajanan Jagirdar with dialogue and lyrics by Anand Kumar. Music was composed by Mir Saheb. The film had Naseem Banu in the lead role with Prem Adib, Gajanan Jagirdar, Navin Yagnik, Sheela, and Abu Baker as co-stars. It is about Roopa (Naseem Banu), a married woman, who fights for better divorce laws, which she then employs to be free of her husband. However, things ultimately go against her when her second husband uses the same laws to divorce her.

Following the debacle of his earlier films based on Shakesperian tragedies like Khoon Ka Khoon (1935) and Said-e-Havas, Modi shifted to making social contemporary dramas like Talaq, Jailor and Meetha Zahar (1938).

== Plot ==
Roopa (Naseem Banu) is married to Niranjan (Navin Yagnik), a politician whom she wants to divorce. However, Niranjan does not want a divorce. With the help of Chhabilelal (Gajanan Jagirdar), the editor of the magazine Aandhi, Roopa manages to change the divorce laws so that she can leave Niranjan. Meanwhile, Niranjan helps a married woman named Shanta (Sheela) and falls in love with her. However, due to his views on divorce, he is unable to marry her. Roopa then marries Amarnath (Prem Adib), who uses the same laws she fought for to divorce her.

== Cast ==
- Naseem Banu as Roopa
- Prem Adib as Amarnath
- Gajanan Jagirdar as Chhabilelal
- Navin Yagnik as Niranjan
- Sheela as Shanta
- Abu Baker
- Khwaja Sabir
- Shanta Dutt
- Khan Mastana
- Vimala Vasishth

== Subject ==
The film deals with the social subject of divorce, which being rare in India at that time was also mainly a male prerogative. Focusing on the "rights of women to divorce", Modi's contemporary social films including Talaq were hugely successful.
