= Talaq (disambiguation) =

Talaq or At Talaq (with the definite article) may refer to:

- Divorce in Islam or Talaq
  - Talaq talaq talaq, also known as triple talaq, a process through which a Muslim man can divorce his wife
  - At-Talaq, or Sūrat aṭ-Talāq, the 65th sura of the Qur'an with 12 ayat
  - Triple talaq in India, also known as talaq-e-mughallazah (Irrevocable divorce) is a form of Islamic divorce that is practiced by Muslims in India
- Talaq (1938 film), Urdu/Hindi social melodrama film directed by Sohrab Modi
- Talaq (1958 film), Indian Bollywood film directed by Mahesh Kaul
- At Talaq (racehorse) (1981–1995), an American-bred Thoroughbred racehorse
