= Zameen (1943 film) =

- A scene from the film, featuring Navin Yagnik and Khurshid Jr.
- Directed by: Pandit Anand Kumar
- Produced by: Anand Pictures
- Starring: Durga Khote; Navin Yagnik; Khurshid Jr.
- Music by: Datta Korgaonkar
- Release date: 1943
- Country: India
- Language: Hindi

Zameen is a 1943 Indian Hindi-language film produced by Anand Pictures and directed by Pandit Anand Kumar. The film's leading cast included Durga Khote, Navin Yagnik and Khurshid Jr.; and its music was composed by Datta Korgaonkar.

Zameen was released in Bombay in March 1944.

== Cast ==
- Durga Khote
- Khurshid Jr.
- Biswas
- S. Nazir
- Khalil
- David
- Navin Yagnik
