= Sneh Bandhan =

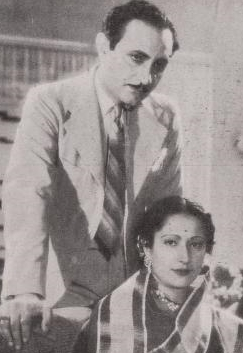
- E. Billimoria and Bibbo in Sneh Bandhan
- Directed by: J. P. Advani
- Written by: J. P. Advani
- Produced by: Kikubhai Desai
- Starring: Bibbo; E. Billimoria; Navin Yagnik
- Cinematography: Gulab Gopal
- Music by: Pannalal Ghosh
- Release date: 20 December 1940
- Country: India
- Language: Hindi

Sneh Bandhan (The Bonds Of Love) also called Intezar, is a social melodrama Bollywood film. It was released in 1940. The film was a maiden production from producer Kikubhai Desai's new banner; Great India Pictures. Previously known to produce crime thrillers and fantasy, this was Desai's first social genre film. The music was by Pannalal Ghosh, with lyrics written by Pandit Betaab. The cast included Bibbo, E. Billimoria, Navin Yagnik, Pratima Devi and Muzammil.

The film focuses on Snehalata, played by Bibbo, who is in love with the poor Gopal, but has to marry the rich Prakash. The story takes several turns in Sneha's life which include murder, a jail term, the birth of a son, stardom, blackmail and again, a killing where her son, now a lawyer, defends her in court.

== Plot ==
Snehlata lives with her postmaster father and is in love with Gopal, who is poor but well-educated. Sneha's mother is not happy with Gopal as she wants Sneha to marry a rich man. Agreeing to wait for a year, Gopal goes to the city to make money. A year passes, but as Gopal has not returned at the stipulated time, Sneha is married off to the rich Pratap who loves her. Sneha is still pining for Gopal and a disappointed Pratap takes to drinking. When Gopal comes to visit Sneha, Pratap, in a jealous rage, kills him. Sneha takes the blame and is jailed for ten years.

In jail, Sneha gives birth to a son, whom she gives up for adoption to the jail's matron, Sushila, with the promise that it should not be revealed to him who his real parents are. Pratap has continued his drinking as well as visiting singing and dancing girls. When her ten years are up, Sneha is released, but Pratap is in custody for killing a singing girl. Sneha decides to kill herself, but is saved by a film producer who helps her attain stardom. She sends the money to Sushila in order to help Kamal, her son, get a good education.

Several years pass and Sneha's son, Kamal, is now a lawyer. Pratap is also released from jail. He finds Sneha and knows the secret about Kamal being their son. He starts blackmailing Sneha and insists on letting Kamal know his parentage. When her pleas fail, Sneha picks up a gun and Pratap tries to snatch it away from her. In the struggle, the gun goes off and Pratap is killed. Kamal, who is still unaware of Sneha, is appointed to defend her in court. Following an extended court scene, Sneha is acquitted with Kamal discovering that she is his mother.

== Cast ==
- Bibbo as Snehlata
- E. Bilimoria as Pratap
- Navin Yagnik as Kamal
- J. P. advani as the Prosecuting lawyer
- Pratima Devi
- Raj Kumari
- Dhulia
- Muzammil
- Kamla

== Soundtrack ==
Pannalal Ghosh was a pioneer in Hindustani classical flute music, and had arrived in Bombay in 1940, to further his career in music. Having assisted in music production earlier while with New Theatres Ltd in Calcutta, Sneh Bandhan was his debut film as an independent music composer. The popular songs from the film were "Aabroo Ke Kamaanon Mein" and "Sneh Bandhan Mein Bandhe Hue", sung by Khan Mastan and Bibbo. The lyrics were by Pandit Betaab and the singers were Bibbo, Khan Mastan and Kamla.

=== Songlist ===
#	Title	Singer
1	"Aag Mein Bagh Lagaane Lagi Thi"	Bibbo
2	"Aabroo Ke Kamaanon Mein Aur Nainon Ke Baanon Mein"	Bibbo, Khan Mastana
3	"Chali Paniya Gagri Lekar Naar"	Kamla
4	"Daras Bin Dukhan Laage Nain"	Bibbo
5	"Kaaga Karta Hai Batiyan"	Bibbo
6	"Main Kitni Bholi Thi Sajni"	Kamla
7	"Pilaaye Ja Pilaaye Ja Bahaare Mai Parasti Hai"	Kamla
8	"Saiyan Toh Bidesi Bhaye"	Bibbo
9	"Sneh Bandhan Mein Bandhe Hue"	Khan Mastan, Bibbo
10	"Teri Aankhon Se Jo Meri"	Kamla
