= Ajit (film) =

1948 Indian film

- Directed by: Mohan Bhavnani
- Based on: Asir of Asirgarh by Snilloc
- Produced by: Mohan Bhavnani
- Starring: Prem Nath; Monica Desai; Yashodhara Katju; Gope
- Production company: Bhavnani Productions
- Release date: 1948
- Country: India

Ajit, also known as Rangeen Zamana, is a 1948 Indian Hindi-language directed by Mohan Bhavnani and produced under the banner of Bhavnani Productions. Among the earliest colour films made in India, it was shot on 16 mm Kodachrome and subsequently enlarged to 35 mm in the United States using the Ansco colour process. Film historian Panna Shah described it as "India's second colour film after a lapse of twelve years".

The story of Ajit was based on Snilloc's novel Asir of Asirgarh. The film marked the acting debut of Prem Nath. Its cast also included Monica Desai, Yashodhara Katju, Gope, Nayampalli, Badri Prasad and Ram Kamlani, with music composed by Govind Ram. Ajit was Bhavnani's final feature film.

Shah gives the film's Bombay release date as 16 December 1949. A contemporary news report stated that the film received a "big ovation" at its theatrical release. Reviews published in The Times of India described Ajit as "a Rajput story fraught with great drama and tender romance" and considered the film's "sheer pictorial beauty in entrancing colour" its "saving grace". Critic Baburao Patel of filmindia reported that Ajit failed at the box office but called its use of colour "quite an experience" as an experimental novelty.

== Cast ==
- Prem Nath
- Monica Desai
- Yashodhara Katju
- Gope
- Nayampalli
- Badri Prasad
- Ram Kamlani
