= Nagma-e-Sahra =

1945 Indian film

Nagma-e-Sahra / Song of The Desert
- Directed by: Bhagwan Dada
- Produced by: Jagriti Pictures
- Starring: Master Vithal; Khurshid Jr.; Bhagwan Dada
- Music by: C. Ramchandra
- Release date: 1945
- Country: India
- Language: Hindi

Nagma-e-Sahra, also known as Song of The Desert, is a 1945 Indian Hindi-language film produced under the banner of Jagriti Pictures and directed by Bhagwan Dada. The film's leading cast included Master Vithal, Khurshid Jr., and Bhagwan Dada; and its music was composed by C. Ramchandra.

== Cast ==
- Master Vithal as Feroz
- Khurshid Jr. as Nargis
- Bhagwan Dada as Altamash
- Amarnath as Jalal
- Kavita Devi as Ishrat

== Release ==
Song of The Desert was released in Bombay in December 1945.

== Reception ==
Critic Baburao Patel stated:

Song Of Desert is a picture produced by a very, very small company of producers. They did not have all that was needed for motion picture production except the enthusiasm and the spirit to produce a motion picture. Viewed in this spirit, Song Of Desert should be called a good effort though, as a motion picture, it remains a very modest presentation.
