= Khurshid Jr. =

Indian actress (1930–2001)

- Khurshid in Nagma-e-Sahra (1945)
- Born: Khurshid; 10 April 1930; Bombay, British India
- Died: 21 July 2001 (aged 71); Bombay, Maharashtra
- Other name: Khurshid Altaf
- Occupation: Actress
- Years active: 1943 – 1980
- Spouse: Altaf
- Children: 3
- Relatives: Meena Kumari (sister); Baby Madhuri (sister)

Khurshid (10 April 1930 – 21 July 2001), also known by her married name Khurshid Altaf, was an Indian actress who worked in Hindi cinema. She used the screen name Khurshid Jr. to differentiate herself from the contemporary star Khurshid Bano. After making her screen debut in Zameen (1943), Khurshid starred in films including Dr. Kumar (1944), Nagma-e-Sahra (1945), Devar (1946), Chheen Le Azadi (1947), and Bichchade Balam (1948). According to film scholar Arunkumar Deshmukh, Khurshid Jr. appeared in 65 films till 1980.

Khurshid's younger sisters, Meena Kumari and Baby Madhuri, also became actresses.

== Early life ==
Khurshid was born on 10 April 1930 in Bombay in a family of Punjabi background. Her parents were music director Master Ali Bux and Bengali actress and dancer Iqbal Begum. Khurshid was the couple's eldest child; her younger sisters were actresses Meena Kumari (1933–1972) and Baby Madhuri (1936/37–1993). Khurshid and her sisters were among the several Muslim actors active in the Indian film industry in the wake of the Partition of India on religious lines.

== Career ==
Khurshid with Navin Yagnik in a scene from Zameen (1943)

Khurshid began her acting career at age 12 playing a supporting character in Zameen (1943). A Bombay Chronicle review deemed her romantic subplot with Navin Yagnik as unnecessary. She progressed to leading roles with Dr. Kumar (1944). In a 1946 profile published in Filmdom, Indian journalist R. A. Shaikh praised her attractive features, youthful charm and acting ability, describing her as a "promising star of tomorrow".

Khurshid afterwards starred in the fantasy film Nagma-e-Sahra (1945), playing Princess Nargis opposite Master Vithal and Bhagwan Dada. In Aspi Irani's Chheen Le Azadi (1947), she portrayed the character of an enslaved woman, partly inspired by Juliet. Khurshid acted opposite her husband Altaf in Chheen Le Azadi, Woh Zamana (1947), and Ret Mahal (1949).

== Personal life and death ==
Khurshid was married to actor Altaf. After the death of her sister Meena Kumari, their finances were adversely affected, with the couple shifting to smaller tenements and their film offers shrinking. Khurshid died in Mumbai on 21 July 2001, aged 74 according to Film Information, and was reportedly survived by two daughters and a son.

In 2014, her daughter Shahina Rana, a resident of Amritsar, claimed her to be the sole heir of Meena Kumari's property at Pali Hill and submitted an application at a Bandra Court, claiming that Khurshid's children were now entitled to "rights, title and interest" in all of the properties that were owned by Kumari.

== Selected filmography ==
Year	Title	Role	Ref.
1943	Zameen		
1943	Ashirwad		
1944	Dr. Kumar		
1944	Parakh		
1945	Nagma-e-Sahra	Nargis	
1946	Devar		
1947	Lakhon Mein Ek	Nalini	
1947	Chheen Le Azadi	Gopi	
1947	Woh Zamana		
1948	Bichchade Balam		
1949	Ret Mahal		
1972	Pakeezah		
1980	Oh Bewafa		
