= Chheen Le Azadi =

1947 Indian film

- Directed by: Aspi Irani
- Produced by: Ranjit Studios
- Starring: Veena; Khurshid Jr.; Altaf Hussein
- Music by: Hansraj Behl
- Release date: 1947
- Country: India
- Language: Hindi

Chheen Le Azadi is a 1947 Indian Hindi-language film produced under the banner of Ranjit Studios and directed by Aspi Irani. The film's leading cast included Veena, Khurshid Jr., and Altaf; and its music was composed by Hansraj Behl. According to critic Baburao Patel, the film was an adaptation of the Gujarati novel Dariyawat, and also adopted elements from the legends of Amrapali and Romeo and Juliet.

== Cast ==
- Veena as Madhvi
- Khurshid Jr. as Gopi
- Altaf Hussein as Randhir
- Ghulam Mohammed as Egyptian slave owner
- Sheikh Hassan as Jaggu

== Reception ==
Chheen Le Azadi was released in Bombay in the last week of September 1947. Among contemporary reviews, The Times of India considered Hansraj Behl's music to be the film's highlight. On the other hand, critic Baburao Patel denounced it as "dangerously boring stuff" and "another Ranjit flop".
