= Main Hari =

- Directed by: Gajanan Jagirdar
- Starring: Naseem Banu, Maya Devi, Navin Yagnik, Eruch Tarapore, Hari Shivdasani, Gulam Hussain
- Release date: 1940
- Country: India
- Language: Hindi

Main Hari is a 1940 Bollywood film directed by Gajanan Jagirdar.
