= Khan Bahadur (film) =

- Directed by: Sohrab Modi
- Produced by: Sohrab Modi
- Starring: Sohrab Modi; Naseem Banu; Prem Adib; Sadiq Ali
- Music by: B. S. Hoogan
- Production company: Minerva Movietone
- Release date: 1937
- Running time: 121 minutes
- Country: India
- Language: Hindi

Khan Bahadur is a 1937 Hindi/Urdu social film produced and directed by Sohrab Modi. The music director was B. S. Hoogan. The film was the acting debut of Prem Adib, who went on to act in mythological and social films becoming famous with Vijay Bhatt-directed films like Bharat Milap (1942) and Ram Rajya (1943). Other actors in the film were Sohrab Modi, Naseem Banu, Sadiq Ali, Eruch Tarapore, Ghulam Hussain and Saadat Ali.

== Cast ==
- Sohrab Modi
- Naseem Banu
- Prem Adib
- Sadiq Ali
- Ghulam Hussain
- Eruch Tarapore
- Sheela
- Saadat Ali

== Soundtrack ==
The music composer was B. S. Hoogan.

=== Song list ===
#	Title
1	"Bekhud Kiye Deta Hai Andaz-E-Hijabaana"
2	"Hum Aisi Sab Kitabein Kaabil-e-japati Samajhte Hain"
3	"Godi Mein Khele Har Aan Mora Nanha Balam"
4	"Kisika Koi Nahin Jag Mein Jab Dhan Maal Na Ho"
5	"Man Chanchal Saiyan Bhole"
6	"Manhar Phool Khile Bagiya Mein"
7	"More Pyare Sajna Mori Bigdi Bana"
8	"Mere Kaabu Mein Na Pahron Dil-e-Nashad Aaya"
9	"Mukhda Pyara Pyara Dekhat Tan Man Waara"
10	"Prem Ke Piyale De Piharwa Bhole Bhale"
11	"Pyari Pyari Aaj Ulfat Ki Duniya Nazar Aaye"
12	"Sawan Ki Ghata Aisi Ghani Pyar Ki Baat Kare Botal"
