= Bichchade Balam =

- Directed by: Manibhai Vyas
- Produced by: Durgadas Saigal
- Starring: Khurshid Jr.; Anjum; Meena Kumari
- Music by: Bulo C Rani
- Production companies: Lajwanti Film Corporation, Calcutta
- Release date: 1948
- Country: India
- Language: Hindi

Bichchade Balam is a 1948 Indian film directed by Manibhai Vyas. The film's cast includes Khurshid Jr., Anjum, Meena Kumari, A.R. Ojha, Mohammed Farooqui, Mohantara Talpade, and Savitri Gidwani. Kumari also lent her voice for playback and sung six songs in this film.

== Soundtrack ==
Track #	Song	Singer(s)	Lyrics	Composer
1	Haseeno Ko Dil Mein Basana Bura Hai	Meena Kumari, AR Oza, Mohammed Faruqu	Pandit Indra	Bulo C Rani
2	Aata Hai Dil Pyaar	Meena Kumari	Pandit Indra Chandra	Bulo C Rani
3	Ek Aag Lagi Dil Mein	Meena Kumari	Pandit Indra	Bulo C Rani
4	Mere Piya Na Aaye Tarsaaye Re	Meena Kumari	Pandit Indra	Bulo C Rani
5	Bol Re Bol Mere Pyare Papihe	Meena Kumari, AR Ojha	Pandit Indra	Bulo C Rani
6	Hai Piya Mujhe Lalchaye Jiya	Meena Kumari,	Pandit Indra	Bulo C Rani
7	Suhagan Kahe Ko Tu Aansu Bahaye	Mohammed Farooqui	Pandit Indra	Bulo C Rani
8	Akeli Akeli Chhod Gayo Re	Mohantara Talpade	Pandit Indra	Bulo C Rani
9	Mera Kya Bigadega Nath	Mohantara Talpade	Pandit Indra	Bulo C Rani
10	Mujhse Aankhe Na Churao	Savitri Gidwani	Pandit Indra	Bulo C Rani
11	Rang De Rangrej Chunariya	Mohantara Talpade	Pandit Indra	Bulo C Rani
