= Behram Khan =

1946 Bollywood film by Gajanan Jagirdar

Behram Khan Bairam Khan
- Directed by: Gajanan Jagirdar
- Release date: 1946
- Country: India
- Language: Hindi

Behram Khan (also spelt Bairam Khan or Bayram Khan) is a Bollywood film. It was released in 1946.

== Details ==
The story of the movie, about the Mughal army commander Bairam Khan, was written by famed poet and writer Hakim Ahmad Shuja, assisted by Kamal Amrohi, and was directed by Gajanan Jagirdar, who also starred in it. The music was composed by Ghulam Haider. Other main cast members included Mehtab, Lalita Pawar, Yusuf Effendi, Sunalini Devi and Suresh.
