= Devar (1946 film) =

1946 Indian film

- Directed by: S. M. Yusuf
- Produced by: Silver Films
- Starring: Kumar; Yakub; Jyoti; Khurshid Jr.
- Music by: Gulshan Sufi
- Release date: 1946
- Country: India
- Language: Hindi

Devar is a 1946 Indian Hindi-language film directed by S. M. Yusuf. The film was produced under the banner of Silver Films, a production company run by actress Esther Victoria Abraham. The leading cast of Devar included Kumar, Yakub, Jyoti and Khurshid Jr.; and its music was composed by Gulshan Sufi.

== Cast ==
- Kumar
- Yakub
- Jyoti
- Khurshid Jr.
- Masood
- Agha
- Yashodhra Katju

== Reception ==
Devar was released in Bombay in November 1948 to a positive reception by audiences. A contemporary Times of India review praised the film as an "Excellent Fare", citing its "Good Script, Slick Direction, Fine Acting & Crisp Cutting".
