= Yashodhra Katju =

Indian actress

- Born: Yashodhara Katju; 15 April 1928; Lahore
- Died: 1974 (aged 45–46)
- Occupation: Actress
- Years active: 1941–1973
- Spouse: Bhandari (Naval officer Commander)
- Parent(s): Pandit Jeevan Lal Katju (father); Kailashwati Mulla Katju (mother) ( sister of Ananad Narain Mulla)

Yashodhara Katju (1928 – 1974) was a Bollywood actress who was the Second Kashmiri Girl after Shyama Zutshi who joined films in 1941. She was born in 1928 in Allahabad.

== Early life, career and personal life ==
Yashodhara Katju was born on 15 April 1928 in Lahore. She was the daughter of Pandit Jeevan Lal Katju who is a family member of Jaipur Katju family Kamala Nehru too was a member of this family. At first they lived in Lucknow but later Pandit Jeevan Lal Katju was appointed as a senior administrative officer by the British Government and transferred to the United Provinces. He then started to live in Lahore. Although he was transferred to Lucknow but with the influence from Pandit Jawaharlal Nehru he later resigned his government job and focused on Politics and freedom struggle. Yashodhara Katju was admitted to Convent of Jesus and Mary, Lahore. Yashodhara’s Mother's name was Kailashwati Mulla Katju who was the sister of Pandit Ananad Narain Mulla, the famous Kashmiri Urdu poet and the Judge of Allahabad High court. She was fluent in English, Gujarati, Marathi, Urdu, Kashmiri and Hindi. She was also proficient in horse Riding, singing (She was a student of Bhatkhande Music Institute, Lucknow ) and dancing ( Kathakali, Kathak and Manipuri ) . Yashodhara Katju dreamed from her childhood to join films against the wishes of her family so she moved to Bombay in 1941. In 1941, she was offered a role in a movie named LALAJI produced by The National Studios. She was then only 14 years old. The movie was completed and released in 1942. Between LALAJI (1942) which was her first movie and DO PHOOL (1973) which was her last movie, she acted in about 85 films. She married Mr Bhandari a Naval officer Commander. After that she lived a very happy married life. Yashodhara Katju died in the year 1974 by a massive heart attack.

== Filmography ==
1. Do Phool (1973),
2. Do Phool (1974) as Malati Rai
3. Agni Rekha (1973), as Damayanti Sharma
4. Chhalia (1973) as a Club member
5. Daag (1973) as School Principal
6. Narad Leela (1972) as Mrs Motiram
7. Chori Chori (1972) as Meena Bai
8. Seema (1971),
9. Paraya Dhan (1971)
10. Hare Rama Hare Krishna (1971),
11. Neelam (1970)
12. Mohabbat (1963)
13. Rajnandini (1962)
14. Amrit Manthan (1961),
15. Pyar Ki Pyas (1961), as Shyama
16. Shravan Kumar (1960), as Chamily
17. Talaqqe (1958) as Kamini
18. Amarsingh Rathod (1957), as Jagrani
19. Badal Aur Bijli (1956),
20. Kismet Ka Khel (1956) as Phooljhadi
21. Ek hi Rasta (1956) as Shova
22. Dwarkadhis (1956)
23. Gouri Puja (1956)
24. Badal aur Bijli (1956)
25. Caravan (1956)
26. Bagdad Ka Chor (1955)
27. Madd Bhare Nain (1955)
28. Waman Avtaar (1955) in Malayalam as Sona
29. Teerandaz (1955)
30. Naqab (1955)
31. Aladin Ka Beta (1955)
32. Durga Pooja (1954)
33. Chakradhari (1954)
34. Dak Babu (1954)
35. Chandni Chok (1954) as Shabnan
36. Mastana (1954) as Rano
37. Adhikar (1954) as Yasodhara
38. Pehali Tarikh (1954)
39. Shabab (1954)
40. Mann (1954)
41. Bagawan (1953)
42. Ek Do Teen (1953) as Asha
43. Baaz (1953) as Nisha's friend
44. Humdard (1953)
45. Baghdad (1952)
46. Dharma Patni (1952) as Shanta
47. Nawjawan (1951) as Bimla
48. Dholak (1951) as Shila
49. Damad (1951)
50. Hamari Shaan (1951)
51. Daman (1951)
52. Ankhen ( The Eyes ) (1950)
53. Bhai Bahen (1950)
54. Surajmukhi (1950)
55. Rakhi (1949)
56. Naach(1949)
57. Sipaiha (1949)
58. Naach (1949)
59. Usha Haran (1949)
60. Pyaar Ki Jeet (1948)
61. Chandralekha (1948)
62. Ajit (1948)
63. Nek Parvin (1946)
64. Devar (1946)
65. Sassi Punnu (1946)
66. Meelam (1945)
67. Ayana (1944)
68. Ghar Ki Shova (1944)
69. Dulhan (1943)
70. Mahatma Bidur (1943)
71. Lalaji (1941)
