= Dr. Kumar =

- Directed by: Kishore Sharma
- Produced by: Minerva Movietone
- Starring: Balwant Singh; Khurshid Jr.
- Music by: Saraswati Devi
- Release date: 1944
- Country: India
- Language: Hindi

Dr. Kumar is a 1944 Indian Hindi-language film produced under the banner of Minerva Movietone and directed by Kishore Sharma. The film's leading cast included Balwant Singh and Khurshid Jr.; and its music was composed by Saraswati Devi.

Dr. Kumar was released in Bombay in November 1944.

== Cast ==
- Balwant Singh
- Khurshid Jr.
- Paresh Bannerjee
- Latika
- Sankatha Prasad
- Rajkumari Shukla
