= Chamiyan Bai =

Indian singer (1898–2000)

- Born: 1898; Kashmir, British India
- Died: 14 August 1998 (aged 99–100); Mumbai, India
- Other names: The Queen of Music [citation needed] Shamshad Begum; Shamshad Begum of Delhi
- Occupations: Singer; Actress; Classical Singer
- Years active: 1916 – 1950
- Spouse: Nawab Abdul Waheed Khan
- Children: Naseem Banu (daughter)
- Relatives: Saira Banu (granddaughter)

Chamiyan Bai, also known as Shamshad Begum (1898 – 14 August 1998), was an Indian singer, actress and courtesan (tawaif) based in Old Delhi during the early 20th century. She was the mother of Bollywood actress Naseem Banu and the maternal grandmother of actress Saira Banu.

== Early life ==
Chamiyan was born in 1898 in Kashmir, British India. She moved to Delhi at a young age. She was born into an artistic family. Her mother was tawaif Jumman Bai, her father was musician Ratan Singh.

== Career ==
Chamiyan became a classical singer and performer in Delhi, and was also a tawaif during the early 20th century. She was trained in classical music and performed frequently on All India Radio. Chamiyan later adopted the name "Shamshad Begum", and recorded songs for Columbia Records.

She also worked as an actress. The acting debut for both herself and her daughter was in Sohrab Modi's 1935 film Khoon Ka Khoon, an adaptation of Shakespeare's Hamlet. She played Gertrude and her daughter played Ophelia. She continued to work in both music and acting, appearing in Indian films alongside her performances as a singer.

== Personal life ==
Chamiyan married Nawab Abdul Waheed Khan, who was from Hasanpur. After the marriage she became known as Shamshad Abdul Waheed Khan. They had a daughter, Roshan Ara Begum, later known as Naseem Banu.

Naseem Banu became an actress in Indian cinema, and her daughter, and Chamiyan's granddaughter, is actress Saira Banu.

== Death ==
Chamiyan Bai died on 14 August 1998, at the age of 100.

== Filmography ==
=== Film ===
| Year | Title | Role | Notes |
|---|---|---|---|
| 1935 | Khoon Ka Khoon | Gertrude | |
