= Khoon Ka Khoon =

1935 Hindi/Urdu film by Sohrab Modi

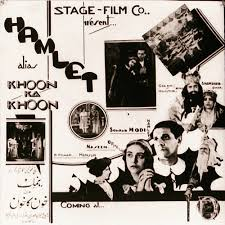
- Theatrical release poster
- Directed by: Sohrab Modi
- Written by: Mehdi Hassan Ahsan
- Produced by: Stage Film Company
- Starring: Sohrab Modi; Naseem Banu; Chamiyan Bai; Ghulam Hussain
- Music by: Kanhaiya Pawar
- Production companies: Minerva Movietone, Stage Film Company, Bombay
- Release date: 1935
- Running time: 122 minutes
- Country: India
- Language: Hindi

Khoon Ka Khoon (transl. Blood for Blood), also known as Hamlet, is a 1935 film and the first Hindi/Urdu sound adaptation of any Shakespearen play in Indian cinema.

Directed by Sohrab Modi under his Stage Film Company banner, it is cited as one of the earliest talkie versions of this play. Credited as "the man who brought Shakespeare to the Indian screen", it was Modi's debut feature film as a director. The story and script were penned by Mehdi Hassan Ahsan from his Urdu adaptation of Shakespeare's Hamlet. Starring Modi, Khoon Ka Khoon was also the debut in films of Naseem Banu who played Ophelia. The other star cast included Chamiyan Bai, Ghulam Hussain, Obali Mai, Fazal Karim and Eruch Tarapore. The film has been cited by National Film Archive of India founder P K. Nair, as one of "21 most wanted missing Indian cinema treasures".

== Plot ==
The film stays close to the play, with Hamlet's father's ghost wanting Hamlet to punish the people responsible for his death. Hamlet, unwilling to believe his mother's involvement, is in a quandary and pretends to be insane. He has a play staged denouncing his mother and uncle. Gertrude drinks the poison intended for Hamlet, while Hamlet kills his treacherous uncle/step-father before succumbing to his own fatal wounds.

== Cast ==
- Sohrab Modi as Hamlet
- Naseem Banu as Ophelia
- Chamiyan Bai as Gertrude
- Ghulam Hussain
- Obali Mai
- Fazal Karim
- Eruch Tarapore
- Ghulam Mohiyuddin
- Shamshad
- Rampiary
- Gauhar
- B. Pawar

== Production ==
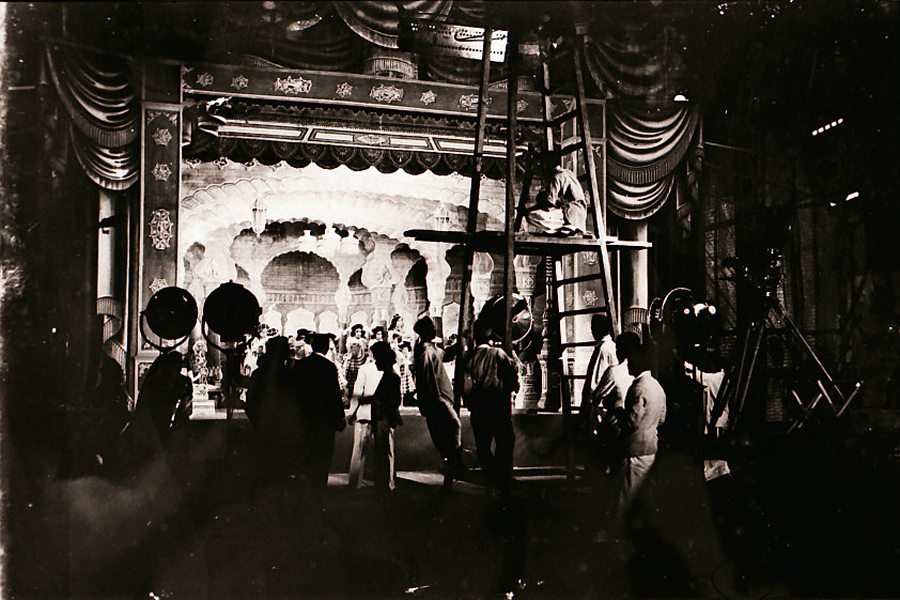
Shooting of the film

As reported by Peter Morris, Khoon Ka Khoon was a "recording of a stage production", Modi filmed it using two cameras as the play was being staged. The play was a mix of Elizabethan costumes for the main leads, with a mixture of Western stage and Indian costumes for other characters in the play. Modi decided to film the play shot by shot as in the staging of the play. Mehdi Ahsan, a known writer of the Parsi theatre had earlier adapted the play for the silent film Khoon-e-Nahak (1928), before staging it for Modi. He apparently stated that he had to alter the Shakesperean plays to suit the Indian audience's "way of thinking".

Director Modi asked Chamiyan Bai, Naseem Banu's mother, to play to play the role of Gertrude (Hamlet's mother), in order to take the pressure off the young Naseem during shooting.

== Box office and reception ==
Khoon Ka Khoon, which was the first sound version of a Shakespeare play was not a success at the box office. However, Modi's film was appreciated mainly for the Urdu dialogues, the "quality of the play" and his acting. Modi's acting was noted as a performance dominating the film.

== Soundtrack ==
The music was provided by Kanhaiya Parwar with lyrics by Mehndi Hassan Ahmed.

=== Song list ===
#	Title
1	"Aaja Tora Saiyan Mandarwa Mein Aayo"
2	"Baise Betaabiye Dil Hai"
3	"Tore Mann Ki Kachhu Na Puri Ho Aas"
4	"Mohana Pyari Sanam Se Milao"
5	"Sakhi Kaise Yeh Dukh Sah Jaaye"
6	"Mohe Naare Jeeshan Tu Bana Bana Ae"
7	"Hain Yeh Sab Saamne Raahat Neend Aane Ke Liye"
8	"Kaahe Chhod Pyar Dilbar AAhe More Yaar"
9	"Maano Maano Ri Pyaari Batiyan"
10	"Ja Ja Mujhi Dekhi Teri Dilari Ki Shaan"
11	"Dar Gulistan Gulrakhan Naazani Neera"
12	"Gul Aur Sambul Soman Nargis Gulshan Mein"
13	"Dar Dar Dilbar Dekhti Dukh Dariya Doobi Naari"
14	"Darwaja Pe Maara Nisaan"
15	"Darkhansha Nazmein Muqaddar Aasman Mein"
16	"Daawar Daadar Kaadir Sataar Daatar Lakh Baar"
