= David Abraham Cheulkar =

Indian actor (1908–1982)

David Abraham
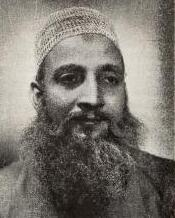
- David in Gvalan
- Born: David Abraham Cheulkar; 21 June 1908; Thane, Bombay Presidency, British India
- Died: 2 January 1982 (aged 73); Toronto, Ontario, Canada
- Years active: 1937–1982

David Abraham Cheulkar (21 June 1908 – 2 January 1982), popularly known as David, was an Indian Hindi film actor. In a career spanning four decades, he played mostly character roles, starting with the 1941 film Naya Sansar, and went on to act in over 110 films, including memorable films such as Gol Maal (1979), Baton Baton Mein (1979) and Boot Polish (1954), for which he was awarded the 1955 Filmfare Best Supporting Actor Award.

== Early and personal life ==
David Abraham Cheulkar was born in British India. He was raised by his older brothers as his father Abraham died when David was young. His mother Dinah, who had Marathi background, lived until the age of 104. David was a member of Mumbai's Marathi-speaking Bene Israel community. As a child, he liked to act in plays. He took part in many French plays that he used to perform in his neighbor’s garden. David graduated from the University of Mumbai with a Bachelor of Arts degree in 1930. He obtained a degree in law from the Government Law College.In 1936 he decided to try his luck in the Hindi film industry by becoming a professional actor.

On 15 January 1937, with the help of his close friend Nayampalli, an actor, he landed his first role in a film. The film was Zambo the Ape Man, and it was being produced and directed by Mohan Bhavnani, who was the Chief Producer of the Films Division of the Government of India. David Cheulkar never married.

== Career ==
David was actively associated with IPTA, a theatre organization, and went on to take part in many Khwaja Ahmad Abbas's films, including Palme d'Or nominee Pardesi (1957), and Shehar Aur Sapna (1963), which won the 1964 National Film Award for Best Feature Film, Munaa and Char Dil Char Raahein.

Strongly associated with avuncular roles, David is best known for his portrayal of "John Chacha" in the 1954 hit and Filmfare Award for Best Film winner and Palme d'Or nominee, Boot Polish, directed by Prakash Arora, for which he won the 1955 Filmfare Best Supporting Actor Award. The song "Nanhe Munne Bachche" from the film, picturized on him became a memorable song of that era.

In his prime, in the period 1959 to 1975, David was one of the best and the most well-known hosts of prominent award shows and other functions. In one of his speeches of Jawaharlal Nehru, the prime minister, said that any of the events would be surely be incomplete without David's speech.

He was involved in promoting sports, and later became India's Olympic Games representative. He was awarded the Padma Shri award in 1969 by the Government of India.

Often billed as simply David or Uncle David, Cheulkar appeared in more than 110 Bollywood films in a career that exceeded four decades, many of them indeed as a kindly, avuncular character. Among his more notable performances were his roles in Boot Polish (1954), in which he played John Chacha, a kindly bootlegger who, before he is sent off to jail, takes two orphan siblings under his wing and teaches them to work for a living shining shoes, rather than to get by begging. Cheulkar received the Filmfare magazine Best Supporting Actor prize for that role.

He was also featured in Pardesi (Journey Beyond Three Seas), a 1957 Russian-Indian coproduction taking place in the 1400s; The City and the Dream (Shehar Aur Sapna, in Hindi), a naturalistic urban drama from 1963, that was nominated for Indias National Film Award as best feature, and the romantic comedy Chupke Chupke from 1975 (from minute 1 to minute 2 of clip).

In the 1969 film Satyakam, Cheulkar was given the opportunity to play against type, taking the role of Rustom, a debauched drunkard who serves as a foil to the hero of the film, a family drama that takes place during the final days of British rule in India, in 1947.

According to his nephew, Bentsion Abraham Chewoolkar, who wrote an essay about his Uncle David, on the centenary of the latter's birth, Cheulkar, though not religiously devout, prayed briefly each day, and always observed Yom Kippur by fasting and by visiting synagogue for the Neilah (closing) service.

== Death ==
He died on 2 January 1982 in Toronto, Ontario, Canada of a heart attack at the age of 73.

== Selected filmography ==
- Zambo the Ape Man (1937)
- Naya Sansar (1941)
- Anjaan (1941)
- Kismet (1943)
- Tasveer (1943)
- Insaan (1944)
- Panna (1944)
- Ghulami (1945)
- Nargis (1946)
- Insaaf (1946)
- Actress (1948)
- Sawan Aya Re (1949)
- Hamara Ghar (1950)
- Rahi (1952)
- Boot Polish (1954)
- Bhai Bhai (1956)
- Pardesi (1957)
- Amar Deep (1958)
- Santan (1959)
- Return of Mr. Superman (Mr. Superman ki Wapsi) (1960)
- Ek Phool Char Kaante (1960)
- Sangeet Samrat Tansen (1962)
- Suhagan (1964)
- Himalaya Ki God Mein (1965)
- Mamta (1966)
- Anupama (1966)
- Aasra (1966)
- Alibaba Aur 40 Chor (1966)
- Suraj (1966)
- Upkar (1967)
- Bambai Raat Ki Bahon Mein (1967)
- Mere Huzoor (1968)
- Sapnon Ka Saudagar (1968)
- Samay Bada Balwan (1969)
- Ek Phool Do Maali (1969)
- Satyakam (1969)
- Nanak Naam Jahaz Hai (1969)
- Jwala (1971)
- Kal Aaj aur kal (1971)
- Anuraag (1972)
- Abhimaan (1973)
- Chupke Chupke (1975)
- Chori Mera Kaam (1975) as John
- Dus Numbri (1976) – Pascal
- Kotwal Saab (1977)
- Close Encounters of the Third Kind (1977)
- Shatranj Ke Khilari (1977)
- Khatta Meetha (1978)
- Satyam Shivam Sundaram (1978) – Bade Babu
- Hamare Tumhare (1979)
- Baton Baton Mein (1979)
- Gol Maal (1979)
- Khubsoorat (1980)
- Sumbandh (1982) – Released after his death.
- Gehri Chot - Urf: Durdesh (1983) – Released after his death. Pakistan, Canada, Bangladesh, India joint production.

== Awards and recognition ==
- 1969 – Padma Shri award by the Government of India
