= Raja Rani (1942 film) =

- Directed by: Najam Naqvi
- Starring: Trilok Kapoor; Vanamala
- Release date: 1942
- Country: India
- Language: Hindi

Raja Rani is a Bollywood film. It was released in 1942.
