= Meetha Zahar =

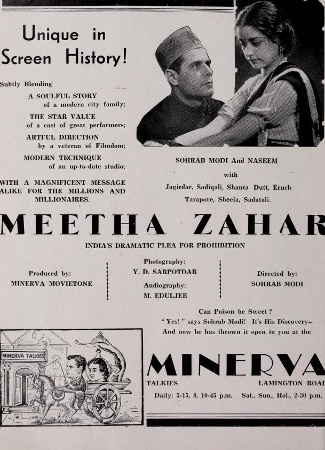
- Directed by: Sohrab Modi
- Written by: Gajanan Jagirdar (screenplay)
- Produced by: Minerva Movietone
- Starring: Naseem Banu; Sohrab Modi; Gajanan Jagirdar; Eruch Tarpore
- Cinematography: Y. D. Sarpotdar
- Music by: B. S. Hoogan; Irshad Ahmed (lyrics)
- Production company: Minerva Movietone
- Distributed by: Evergreen Pictures, Bombay
- Release date: 5 March 1938
- Running time: 127 minutes
- Country: India
- Language: Hindi

Meetha Zahar (Sweet Poison) is a 1938 Indian Hindi/Urdu-language social drama film directed by Sohrab Modi for his Minerva Movietone productions. The screenplay was by Gajanan Jagirdar with dialogue by Munshi Abdul Baqi and director of photography by Y. S. Sarpotdar The music was by B. S. Hoogan with lyrics by Irshad Ahmed. The cast included Naseem Banu, Sohrab Modi, Jagirdar, Sadiq Ali, Eruch Tarapore, Sadat Ali, Sheela and Fakir Mohammed.

Meetha Zahar was a social film dealing with the "evils of alcoholism". Modi was lauded for taking up the cause of prohibition in the nation's interest. The film was a part of the social trilogy Modi made around that time starting with Jailor (1938), which dealt with an illicit relationship concerning a married woman, Meetha Zahar (1938) dealing with prohibition, and Bharosa a social melodrama verging on the incestuous.

== Cast ==
- Naseem Banu
- Sohrab Modi
- Gajanan Jagirdar
- Fakir Mohammed
- Sadiq Ali
- E. Tarapore
- Shanta Dutt
- Sheela

== Review ==
The review of May 1938 by Filmindia editor, Baburao Patel, picked on various aspects of the film. Commending the story, the title itself was cited as "misguiding". The music and recording were praised with criticism for the "jarring" photography. Modi was criticised for his direction, "not at all enterprising and lacks imagination". Jagirdar came in for praise for his acting and holding the film aloft. Modi was considered "stagy" while Naseem Banu came in for the harshest criticism for her acting "Naseem is a rank failure as a screen artiste." Overall box-office value was cited as "good". The harsh treatment meted out to Modi by Patel was referred to by Gangar as due to "old rivalry" between the two, concerning advertising in the magazine.

== Soundtrack ==
The music direction was by B. S. Hoogan with lyrics by Irshad Ahmed. The songs were considered popular with the "rest of the music" quoted as being "good".

=== Song list ===
| # | Title | Singer |
|---|---|---|
| 1 | "Ab Toh Banungi Main Star Film Ki" | Sheela |
| 2 | "Apne Piya Pe Bl Ja KeBhar Bhar Doongi" | Eruch Tarapore, Sheela |
| 3 | "Manmohan Kab Ghar Aayenge Kab Geet Khushi Ke Sunayenge" | Sheela |
| 4 | "Phoolon Ki Mala Apne Devta Ko" | Naseem Banu |
| 5 | "Sakhi Man Ki Baat Tohe Kahun" | Naseem Banu |
| 6 | "Nayan Mohan Prem Bhare Jaadu Nazariya" | |
| 7 | "Mori Sajdhaj Hai Nyari" | |
| 8 | "Hey Prabhu Murari Sankathaari Binti Sun" | |
| 9 | "Sheeshapari Rangili Ras Ki Bhari" | |
