= Jhuthi Sharm =

- Directed by: Mohan Bhavnani
- Release date: 1940
- Country: India
- Language: Hindi

Jhuthi Sharm is a 1940 Bollywood film directed by Mohan Bhavnani. It stars Trilok Kapoor. Produced by Mohan Dayaram Bhavnani's production company, the film is an adaption of Henrik Ibsen's 1881 play Ghosts. The title means "Naked Truth" in Hindi.
