= Zambo the Ape Man =

- Navin Yagnik as Zambo / Tarzan
- Directed by: Mohan Bhavnani
- Produced by: Mohan Bhavnani
- Starring: Navin Yagnik
- Music by: Pandit Badriprasad
- Release date: 1937
- Country: India
- Language: Hindi

Zambo the Ape Man, also released as Sher-e-Jungle, is a 1937 Indian Hindi-language film directed and produced by Mohan Bhavnani. Starring Navin Yagnik in the titular role, it was the first Tarzan-inspired Indian film. The supporting cast includes Nayampally, Sarla, Indira Wadkar, Salvi, David Abraham Cheulkar, Gulam Kadir, and Noor Mohammed Charlie. Its music was composed by Pandit Badriprasad.

Zambo marked Bhavnani's return to commercial cinema after a few experimental films. Journalist R. A. Shaikh, in his book Filmdom (1946), described Zambo as "India's first jungle picture and the biggest box office draw of 1937". The film's success inspired a sequel, Zambo Ka Beta (1939; aka Son of Zambo).

In a retrospective assessment of the film, critic Khwaja Ahmad Abbas commented:

It was inevitable that sooner or later we must get an Indian edition of Tarzan. Producer Bhavnani provided it in Zambo which was released some years ago. It fell far short of that polish and finish which the Hollywood Tarzan has now achieved, nor did it present such elaborate jungle sequences. But still it did achieve considerable success, especially in the smaller towns where the unsophisticated audiences have no opportunity to make inconvenient comparisons.

== Plot ==
A group of adventurers exploring a jungle encounter a jungle-dwelling man (Navin Yagnik) and a missing link (Nayampally). The jungle man develops an interest in the expedition's female member and abducts her.

== Cast ==
- Navin Yagnik as Zambo / Tarzan
- Nayampally
- Sarla
- Indira Wadkar
- Salvi
- David Abraham Cheulkar
- Gulam Kadir
- Noor Mohammed Charlie
