= Gajanan Jagirdar =

Indian actor

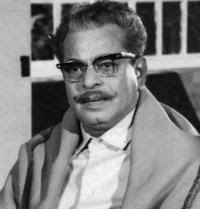
- Born: 2 April 1907; Amravati, Central Provinces and Berar, British India
- Died: 13 August 1988 (aged 81); Bombay, Maharashtra, India
- Occupations: Actor, screenwriter, director

Gajanan Jagirdar (2 April 1907 – 13 August 1988) was a veteran Indian film director, screenwriter and actor. He worked in Hindi Cinema, also called Bollywood, as well as Marathi cinema. The period of 1942 to 1947, saw his rise as a film director with Prabhat Films.

He was appointed as the first director (then principal) of the Film and Television Institute of India (FTII) in 1960 which was known as Film Institute of India then. Jagirdar served as the director of the FTII for just over a year, from 1961 to 1962. He was associated with the Prabhat Film Company for three decades before his FTII role, when the campus was the base of the Prabhat.

He became a well-known pedagogue applying the acting theories of Stanislavsky to the prevailing local conditions.

At the 1962 National Film Awards his film Vaijayanta was awarded the Second Best Marathi Feature Film.

== Early life ==
Gajanan Jagirdar was born on 2 April 1907 in Amravati, a city in Amravati district, which was a part of the erstwhile Bombay Presidency of British India. He started acting as a child actor in the amateur stage. Gajanan was a teacher before joining the film industry.

== Film career ==
Gajanan began his film career in 1931 as a scenarist and assistant director in Prabhat Film Company and became a full-fledged film director only two years later in 1934. His first Bollywood film was Sinhasan (1934) as a director. Gajanan Jagirdar's role of Ramshastri in the movie Ramshastri (film) won him immense appreciation and popularity.

== Filmography ==
=== As director ===
- Honhar (1936)
- Main Hari (1940)
- Charnon Ki Dasi (1941)
- Vasantsena (1942)
- Ramshastri (1944, Marathi)
- Behram Khan (1946, Hindi)
- Jail Yatra (1947)
- Birha Ki Raat (1950)
- Umaaje Naik (1961, Marathi) (as producer)
- Vijayanta (1961, Marathi)

=== As actor ===
- Talaq (1938) - Chhabilelal
- Meetha Zahar (1938)
- Shejari (1941) - Mirza
- Payachi Dasi (1941) - Nokheram
- Padosi (1941) - Mirza
- Vasantsena (1942) - Shakar
- Kanoon (1943)
- Ramshastri (1944) - Ramshastri
- Kiran (1944)
- Jhumke (1946)
- Behram Khan (1946)
- Dhanyawad (1948)
- Lekh (1949)
- Sabak (1950)
- Chhatrapati Shivaji (1952) - King Aurangzeb
- Armaan (1953)
- Mahatma (1953, Marathi)
- Gajanan Maharaj Ki Jai (1954)
- Malka-e-Alam Noorjehan (1954)
- Mahatma Kabir (1954)
- Maan (1954)
- Angarey (1954) - Singoba
- Ghar Ghar Mein Diwali (1955) - Seth Mohanlal
- Ramshastri Ka Nyay (1956)
- Chhoo Mantar (1956) - The King
- Yahudi Ki Ladki (1957)
- Talaash (1957)
- Paying Guest (1957) - Public Prosecutor Dayal
- Apradhi Kaun? (1957) - Shree Nath / Dina Nath
- Trolley Driver (1958)
- Karigar (1958) - Shankar's Employer
- Dulhan (1958) - Seth Dhanpal
- Raj Tilak (1958) - Sardar Mangal Sen
- Qaidi No. 911 (1959) - Jailor
- Chacha Zindabad (1959) - Judge Khanna
- Hum Hindustani (1960) - Verma
- Babar (1960) - Shehenshah Jaheeruddin Babar
- Hum Dono (1961) - Mita's Father
- Main Chup Rahungi (1962) - Ratan Kumar
- Aarti (1962) - Deepak's Father
- Grahasti (1963) - Maya and Radha's dad
- Ek Don Teen (1964)
- Guide (1965) - Bhola
- Tu Hi Meri Zindagi (1965)
- Saiyan Se Neha Lagaibe (1965)
- Kaajal (1965) - Saxena
- Ek Saal Pehle (1965)
- Yugo Yugo Mi Vaat Pahili (1965, Marathi)
- Shankar Khan (1966) - Lala Kedarnath
- Suraj (1966) - Ram Singh
- Amrapali (1966) - Kulpati Mahanam
- Hum Kahan Ja Rahe Hain (1966) - Principal
- Dillagi (1966) - Raibahadur
- Chhota Bhai (1966) - Poojary
- Mera Naam Johar (1968) - Lalji
- Dil Aur Mohabbat' (1968) - Hostel Warden
- Jhuk Gaya Aasman (1968) - Shankarlal Khanna
- Humsaya (1968) - Sharma - Intelligence Office Chief
- Farishta (1968)
- Beti Tumhare Jaisi (1969)
- Aadmi Aur Insaan (1969) - Judge
- Ittefaq (1969) - Dr. Trivedi
- Sajan (1969) - Guruji
- Paisa Ya Pyaar (1969) - Shankarlal
- Nanak Naam Jahaz Hai (1969) - Judge
- Insaan Aur Shaitan (1970) - Shankar Chauhan
- Ghar Ghar Ki Kahani (1970) - Padma's brother
- Devi (1970) - Ram Singh (Driver)
- Chingari (1971 film)
- Veer Chhatrasal (1971)
- Bahake Kadam (1971)
- Nate Jadale Don Jiwaache (1971)
- Chingari (1971) - Advocate
- Jwala (1971) - Sardar
- Hulchul (1971) - Padma's Father
- Albela (1971)
- Chori Chori (1972) - Komal's Father
- Zindagi Zindagi (1972) - Mr. Sharma
- Sub Ka Saathi (1972) - Sevak Ram
- Sonal (1973)
- Bandhe Haath (1973) - Seth. Harnam Das
- Aa Gale Lag Jaa (1973) - Dr. Saxena
- Badi Maa (1974)
- Woh Main Nahin (1974) - Judge
- Raja Shiv Chhatrapati (1974)
- Hamrahi (1974)
- Archana (1974) - Gopal Kaka
- Aashiana (1974)
- Awara Ladki (1975)
- Mutthi Bhar Chawal (1975)
- Dafaa 302: Indian Penal Code Section 302 (Section of Murder) (1975) - Judge
- Badnaam (1975) - Shankerlal
- Gumrah (1976) - Professor Vaidya
- Aaj Ka Ye Ghar (1976)
- Immaan Dharam (1977) - Barkat Chacha
- Dhoop Chhaon (1977) - Abdul
- Shankar Hussain (1977) - Mir Irshaad Hussain
- Ram Bharose (1977)
- Paradh (1977)
- Naami Chor (1977)
- Mera Vachan Geeta Ki Kasam (1977) - Swamiji
- Mandir Masjid (1977)
- Aadmi Sadak Ka (1977) - Retd. Commissioner Upendra Nath
- Des Pardes (1978) - Mr. Sahni
- Saajan Bina Suhagan (1978) - Doctor (uncredited)
- Karmayogi (1978) - Principal
- Dost Asava Tar Asa (1978) - Retired Commissioner
- Ankh Ka Tara (1978) - Karim
- Anjaam (1978) - Maharaja
- Saanch Ko Aanch Nahin (1979) - Hariram
- Naiyya (1979) - Sarpanch of Lakhipur
- Maan Apmaan (1979) - Parvati's dad
- Beqasoor (1980 film) - Jagmohan Sinha
- Premika (1980)
- Manokaamnaa (1980) - Jain (Ex-DFO)
- Chambal Ki Kasam (1980) - Radhu Kaka
- Dostana (1980) - High School Principal
- Maan Abhiman (1980) - Money-lender Prabhu Dayal Gupta
- Dahshat (1981) - Elderly Doctor
- Kaalia (1981) - 1st Defense Attorney
- Umrao Jaan (1981) - Maulvi
- Maan Gaye Ustaad (1981) - Prosecuting Lawyer
- Khud-Daar (1982) - Judge
- Dharam Kanta (1982) - Mukhiya
- Sun Sajna (1982) - Doctor
- Love in Goa (1983) - Mr. D'Souza
- Rishta Kagaz Ka (1983) - Professor Sharma
- Lal Chunariya (1983) - Kundan's dad
- Laila (1984)
- Maan Maryada (1984) - Police Commissioner
- Bepanaah (1985) - Brahmprakash Bharadwaj
- Aap Ke Saath (1986) - Parsaji (oldman in "Aged Home")
- Sutradhar (1987) - Headmaster
- Soorma Bhopali (1988)
- Pyase Nain (1989) - Senior Police Inspector (final film role)

== Awards and honors ==
Gajanan Jagirdar was awarded the best actor award for his portrayal of the poet Parshuram in the film Shahir Parshuram by Government of Maharashtra in 1962. The Bengal journalists Association in 5th Annual BFJA Awards bestowed upon him the best actor award for his performance in the film's Padosi. The same Bengal journalists Association in 8th Annual BFJA Awards honoured him doubly in 1944 by citing him both as Best Actor of the Year and Best Director of the Year for his film Ramshastri.

== Death ==
Gajanan Jagirdar died of a heart attack on 13 August 1988 at his residence in Bombay (now Mumbai), aged 81.
