= Naseem Banu =

Indian actress (1916–2002)

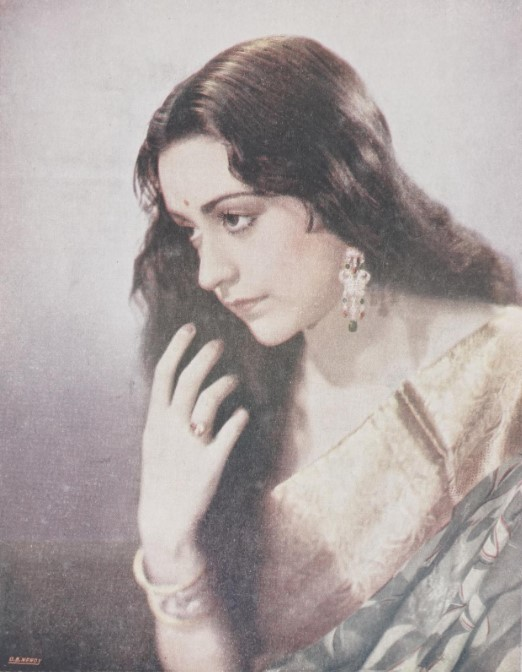
- Banu in the film Ujala (1942)
- Born: Roshan Ara Begum; 1 January 1916; Delhi, British India (present-day India)
- Died: 18 June 2002 (aged 86); Mumbai, Maharashtra, India
- Occupation: Actress
- Years active: 1935–1966
- Notable work: Pukar (1939); Sheesh Mahal (1950)
- Spouse: Mian Ehsan-ul-Haq
- Children: Saira Banu (daughter); Sultan Ahmed (son)
- Parent: Chamiyan Bai (mother)
- Relatives: Sayyeshaa (great-granddaughter); Dilip Kumar (son-in-law)

Naseem Banu (born Roshan Ara Begum; 1 January 1916 – 18 June 2002) was an Indian actress. Starting her acting career in the mid-1930s, she continued to act till the mid-1950s. Her first film was Khoon Ka Khoon (Hamlet) (1935) with Sohrab Modi under whose Minerva Movietone banner she acted for several years. The high point of her acting career came with Modi's Pukar (1939) in which she played the role of Empress Nur Jahan. According to composer Naushad she got the sobriquet Pari-Chehra (fairy face) Naseem through the publicity advertisements of her films. She was the mother of actress Saira Banu and mother-in-law to the actor Dilip Kumar.

== Early years ==
Naseem Banu was born as Roshan Ara Begum on 1 January 1916 in Old Delhi, India, into a community of performers and entertainers. Her mother, Chamiyan Bai (also known as Shamshad Begum, not to be confused with the playback singer who had the same name), was a famous and well-earning singer and tawaif of those days. Years later, when Naseem was in her prime, and earning a salary of ₹ 3,500, she stated that her mother was, even at that time in her old age, earning more than she was.

Naseem studied at Queen Mary's High School, Delhi; her mother Shamshad Begum wanted her to become a doctor. Naseem was keen on films and admired the actress Sulochana (Ruby Myers), ever since she had seen a film of hers, but her mother was against the idea of films. On a visit to Bombay, Naseem got interested in seeing the film shootings and at one of the sets she was approached by Sohrab Modi to play Ophelia in his film Hamlet. Her mother refused permission and Naseem went on a hunger-strike till her mother agreed. Having played the role, Naseem was unable to continue her education as the school was shocked at her acting in films, then considered a lowly profession.

== Career ==
Naseem returned to Bombay and signed a contract with Sohrab Modi. She had started her career with Khoon Ka Khoon (1935) and went on to make several films with Modi under the Minerva Movietone banner. After acting in films like Khan Bahadur (1937), Talaq (1938), Meetha Zahar and Vasanti (both 1938) she started work in what became known as her most famous film Pukar in the role of Noor Jahan. To prepare for the film she went riding every day and learnt singing. The film took over a year to complete and brought Naseem into prominence in a spectacular manner. One of her songs, "Zindagi Ka Saaz Bhi Kya Saaz Hai" became popular with the audiences. The publicity of the film dealt on her beauty calling her Beauty Queen and Pari Chehra a name that was to endure over the years before passing on to her daughter Saira Banu. After the classic Pukar, the demand for Naseem as an actress increased and she was approached by several film studios to act with them. But Sohrab Modi refused to release her from her contract. This caused some uneasiness between the two. Sheesh Mahal (1950), produced by Minerva show-cased her acting talents devoid of make-up and jewellery and clad only in simple sarees. From Minerva Movietone, Naseem moved to Circo and then Filmistan studios where she performed in Chal Chal Re Naujawan with Ashok Kumar.

Married to Ehsan by now, the husband-wife team started Taj Mahal Pictures and made several films like Ujala (1942), Begum (1945), Mulaqat (1947), Chandni Raat (1949) and Ajeeb Ladki (1952) under the home banner. The last two were also directed by her husband, Mohammed Ehsan. However she did a couple of action and fantasy films ("low-grade films") like Sinbad Jahazi (1952) and Baghi (1953), in which she was not accepted by the audiences. She acted in Minerva's Nausherwan-E-Adil (1957) in a small role and then quit acting. She continued to remain active, first trying her hand as a producer, and then as her daughter's dress-designer when Saira entered films with Junglee (1961).

Some of her best films are Pukar (1939), Chal Chal Re Naujawan (1944), Anokhi Ada (1948), Sheesh Mahal (1950) and Shabistan (1951). She co-starred with most of the top stars of those days like Sohrab Modi, Chandra Mohan, Prithviraj Kapoor, Trilok Kapoor, Ashok Kumar, Shyam, Surendra, Navin Yagnik, Prem Adib, and Rehman. It was during the shooting of Shabistan (1951) that the famous actor Shyam had a fall from the horseback and died. She was one of the costume designers for the film Purab Aur Paschim (1970).

== Personal life ==
Naseem married her childhood friend an architect, Mian Ehsan-ul-Haq, with whom she started the Taj Mahal Pictures banner. They had two children, a daughter Saira Banu and a son, Sultan Ahmed (1939 - 2016). Naseem's husband opted to leave India and settle in Pakistan following Partition. Naseem stayed back in India with her children. Ehsan took the negatives of her films releasing the films in Pakistan where she had a following because of it. Naseem moved to England and stayed there for some time with both her son and daughter studying there for a while. Naseem helped Dilip Kumar and Saira Banu get married according to the Times of India report with the 44-year-old Kumar marrying a 22-year-old Saira Banu. However, in the Stardust interview Naseem stated that she was surprised at the two getting married as she thought that Dilip Kumar was a "confirmed bachelor" though she had noted the interest Kumar was taking in Saira Banu.

Naseem died on 18 June 2002 in Mumbai at the age of 86.

Her great-granddaughter is Sayyesha through Sultan Ahmed.

== Filmography ==
As an actress

Year	Title	Role	Language	Notes
1935	Khoon Ka Khoon	Ophelia	Hindi/ Urdu	Debut film & role
1937	Khan Bahadur		Hindi/ Urdu	
1938	Meetha Zahar		Hindi/ Urdu	
1938	Talaq	Roopa	Hindi/ Urdu	
1938	Vasanti	Vasanti	Hindi/ Urdu	
1939	Pukar	Nur Jahan	Hindi/ Urdu	
1940	Main Hari	Naseem	Hindi/ Urdu	
1942	Ujala		Hindi/ Urdu	
1944	Chal Chal Re Naujawan	Sumitra	Hindi/ Urdu	
1945	Begum		Hindi/ Urdu	
1946	Door Chalen		Hindi/ Urdu	
1946	Jeevan Swapna		Hindi/ Urdu	
1947	Mulaqat	Saeeda	Hindi/ Urdu	
1948	Anokhi Ada	Kamini	Hindi/ Urdu	
1949	Chandni Raat		Hindi/ Urdu	
1950	Sheesh Mahal	Ranjana	Hindi/ Urdu	
1951	Shabistan		Hindi/ Urdu	
1952	Ajeeb Larki		Hindi/ Urdu	
1952	Betaab		Hindi/ Urdu	
1952	Sinbad Jahazi		Hindi/ Urdu	
1953	Baghi		Hindi/ Urdu	
1957	Nausherwan-E-Adil	Malika-E-Iran Khazar	Hindi/ Urdu	Uncredited
1960	Kala Bazar	(Herself)	Hindi/ Urdu	One of the stars at the premiere show of Mother India (1957) at Maratha Mandir
1963	Holiday In Bombay	Seema	Hindi/ Urdu	
1966	Chaddian Di Doli		Punjabi	
1967	Nawab Sirajuddaullah		Hindi/ Urdu	
