= Mazdoor (1934 film) =

1934 Indian film

- Directed by: Mohan Bhavnani
- Written by: Premchand
- Production company: Ajanta Cinetone
- Release date: 1934
- Country: India
- Language: Hindi

Mazdoor (transl. Worker), also known as The Mill, is a 1934 Indian Hindi-language film directed by Mohan Bhavnani and produced by Ajanta Cinetone. It was written by the author Premchand, who also appeared in it, and centres on a strike at a textile mill. The film was refused a certificate in Bombay over its treatment of industrial conflict and is now considered lost.

== Plot ==
A young man inherits a textile mill and runs it for maximum profit at the expense of its workers. His sister, who co-owns the mill, sides with the workers and leads a strike. After the brother is jailed, she reopens the mill and runs it with the workers' support.

== Production ==
Ajanta Cinetone engaged Premchand on a salary of ₹8,000. He wrote the script and took a small part as the leader of the striking workers.

== Censorship and release ==
The film was submitted to the Bombay Board of Film Censors on 5 February 1935. The board withheld a certificate in Bombay, holding that it could damage relations between workers and management. It was alleged that Byramjee Jeejeebhoy, a board member and president of the Bombay Mill Owners' Association, had influenced the decision. The film was released in Lahore, Delhi and Lucknow, where it was withdrawn within weeks after it stirred mill workers. The writer Khwaja Ahmad Abbas praised the strike scenes, singling out a shot of a worker raising a clenched fist.

== Legacy ==
No print of the film is known to survive, and the Film Heritage Foundation lists it among ten notable lost Indian films compiled by the archivist P. K. Nair. Premchand left the film industry soon afterwards and set out his misgivings about it in the essay "Cinema aur Sahitya".
