= Mohan Bhavnani =

Indian film director, producer and documentary filmmaker

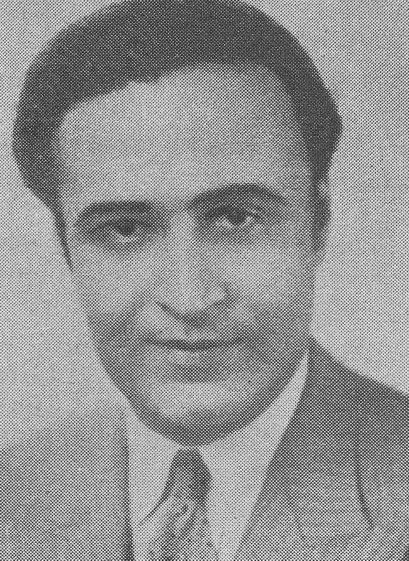
- Bhavnani c. mid-1940s
- Born: Mohan Dayaram Bhavnani; 1903; Hyderabad, Sindh, British India
- Died: 30 December 1962; Bombay, Maharashtra, India
- Occupations: Film director; producer; documentary filmmaker
- Years active: 1925–1958
- Spouse: Enakshi Rama Rao
- Children: Ashok Bhavnani
- Awards: President's Gold Medal for the Best Documentary Film (1957)

Mohan Dayaram Bhavnani (1903 – 30 December 1962) was an Indian film director, producer and documentary filmmaker. Regarded as a pioneering figure of Hindi cinema, he began his career in the silent film era and worked at the Kohinoor and Imperial film companies, where he directed several films starring Sulochana. He later established his own production companies, including Ajanta Cinetone and Bhavnani Productions, and directed films such as Vasantsena (1930), Mazdoor (1934) and Ajit (1948).

Bhavnani was also an early practitioner of Indian animation and produced and directed Lafanga Langoor (1935). Following Indian independence, in 1948, he became the first Chief Producer of the Films Division of India, helping establish its documentary production programme. He advocated adapting filming techniques to audiences with different levels of familiarity with cinema and remained involved in documentary filmmaking after leaving Films Division in 1954. His 1957 documentary A Himalayan Tapestry won the President's Gold Medal for the Best Documentary Film. In 1958, he was invited by Zhou Enlai, the premier of China, to make a documentary about the country.

== Early life and education ==
Bhavnani was born in 1903 in Hyderabad, Sindh, in British India. He studied at the College of Technology in Manchester from 1921 to 1924 and subsequently travelled to Germany, where he received training in filmmaking in 1924. As a part of this training, Bhavnani worked as an apprentice at UFA Studios in Berlin, according to Giulia Battaglia.

== Career ==
=== Silent films ===
Bhavnani began his career with Kohinoor Film Company, where he worked from 1925 to 1926. During this period, he directed a number of films featuring actress Sulochana, helping develop her screen persona as a major film star. Among his collaborations with her were Cinema Ni Rani, in which she portrayed a celebrated actress who becomes the object of a painter's affection, and Wildcat of Bombay, in which she appeared in several different roles.

He subsequently joined Imperial Film Company in 1927 and worked for it till 1929. One of his films for the studio was Khwab-e-Hasti, based on the novel Dreamland. Bhavnani also directed Vasantsena, which was notable as an early Kannada-intertitled film. His wife, Enakshi Rama Rao, was the star of the film.

In 1931–1932, Bhavnani became an independent producer through Indian Art Productions. He subsequently returned to Germany to study developments in sound-film technology.

=== Sound films and independent production ===
Bhavnani established Ajanta Cinetone in 1933–1934 and subsequently founded Bhavnani Productions. His first sound production was a commercial failure but marked the screen debut of actress Durga Khote.

Bhavnani had an interest in literary and socially oriented cinema which led him to collaborate with Hindi novelist Premchand on Mazdoor (1934), a film about the conflict between labour and capital. Premchand wrote the screenplay, making the film his principal direct involvement with cinema. The film encountered severe censorship problems and was banned on the grounds that it promoted Communist propaganda. The controversy affected Bhavnani's relationship with Ajanta Cinetone and contributed to his subsequent shift towards more commercially oriented productions. He followed Mazdoor with Jagran, a film centred on unemployment.

=== Animation ===
In 1935, Bhavnani Productions established an animation department and began developing a series of cartoons under the proposed Monkey Brand banner. The department employed eight artists from Bombay's J. J. School of Art, as well as German technical specialist Bodo Gutschwager, who had previously worked on Fritz Lang's Metropolis.

The first film in the series, Lafanga Langoor, was exhibited with Swapna Swayamvar in November 1935. Bhavnani planned to produce a series of full-length cartoons, but only two were announced. A second film was reported to be nearing completion for release in December, although no record of its subsequent release has been located. Bhavnani subsequently moved further towards commercial stunt films, beginning with Zambo the Ape Man (1937).

=== Later feature productions ===
Among Bhavnani's later achievements was Ajit (1948), a colour film initially photographed on 16 mm Kodachrome and enlarged to 35 mm for exhibition. Produced and directed by Bhavnani, it was among the early Indian feature films to employ colour cinematography in this manner.

== Documentary filmmaking ==
=== Films Division of India ===
Following Indian independence, the central government established a Film Unit in Bombay to produce documentaries and other short films for public communication and nation-building. The unit was renamed Films Division of India in April 1948, with Bhavnani appointed to head the organisation. In July that year, he was appointed Deputy Controller of Documentaries, a position subsequently redesignated Chief Producer (Documentaries). He established the organisation's operations at Gulshan Mansion on Pedder Road in Bombay.

Films Division began distributing newsreels and documentaries in June 1949, releasing 97 shorts, documentaries and newsreels during 1949–1950. Among the films produced during Bhavnani's tenure were Jaipur: Memories of Mewar, Kumaon Hills, Holy Himalayas, Darjeeling, Mahabalipuram, The Story of Steel, The Story of Sindri and The Vital Link. According to filmmaker Jagat Murari, the Films Division under Bhavnani was a period of discovery, with filmmakers "constantly on the move, searching and filming the soul of India".

Several of Bhavnani's short films competed internationally for the Grand Prix du court métrage / Short Film Grand Prix at the Cannes Film Festival, including Festival Time, The Private Life of a Silk Worm and Rajasthan N° 1 (all three in 1951), Kumaon Hills (1953), Feminine Fashions, Folk Dances of India and River of Hope (all three in 1954), and Magic of the Mountains (1957).

=== Documentary philosophy ===
According to scholar Peter Sutoris, Bhavnani was instrumental in persuading the Indian government to continue documentary production after independence and helped assemble a team of experienced technicians and young directors.

Bhavnani described his experience with the wartime documentary programme as a "blessing in disguise", arguing that it trained filmmakers and provided opportunities for training overseas. Bhavnani also observed that devices commonly used in modern documentaries could confuse rural and less-educated audiences. For films concerning social issues, he therefore preferred a slower pace and occasional repetition of shots to reinforce the principal message: he said that "technical devices were avoided [and] the tempo slowed down" for rural audiences.

Bhavnani's extensive editorial control over Films Division's productions led to tensions with its creative staff. In July 1949, he reviewed Krishna Gopal's Damodar and, despite the filmmakers' expectation that he would reject it, approved the film after requesting only an additional title. Administrator George Berkeley-Hill also recorded instances of Bhavnani altering films against the wishes of junior staff.

=== Departure from Films Division ===
Sutoris records Bhavnani's tenure as Chief Producer as running from April 1948 to 15 May 1954. Camille Deprez states that he was dismissed in 1954 following clashes with government bureaucrats, attributing the conflict partly to the difference between Bhavnani's practical approach to documentary production and the procedural requirements of the government administration.

Six years after leaving Films Division, Bhavnani continued to advocate an independent and socially engaged approach to documentary filmmaking. In a 1960 article for Marg, he argued:

Above all, the making of a pure documentary requires a man of vision and idealism, who can dare to face the revealing truths of his subject, no matter how unpalatable these may be to the various sections of society.

=== Later work ===
After leaving Films Division, Bhavnani continued making short films. A Himalayan Tapestry (1957), produced by the Burmah-Shell film unit, was later regarded by film writer Atma Ram as more inventive than the films Bhavnani had made during his tenure at Films Division. A Himalayan Tapestry won the President's Gold Medal for the Best Documentary Film at the 5th National Film Awards.

In 1958, Bhavnani travelled to China after receiving an invitation from Chinese premier Zhou Enlai to make a documentary about the country. He travelled extensively through China while filming, accompanied by cameramen Kishore Rege and S. K. Kulkarni.

== Personal life and death ==
Bhavnani married actress Enakshi Rama Rao, who had played the lead role in Shiraz (1928). Their son, Ashok (1933–2015), was an architect who worked on the redevelopment of Roosevelt Island and designed Merkin Concert Hall in Manhattan. According to Princeton Alumni Weekly, Ashok received the Albert S. Bard Award for both projects.

Bhavnani died of a heart attack on 30 December 1962, in Bombay, Maharashtra.

== Work and accolades ==
The filmography is based on Encyclopedia of Indian Cinema (1999), published by the British Film Institute.

=== Feature films ===
- Cinema Ni Rani (1925)
- Matri Prem (1925)
- Veer Bala (1925)
- Seth Sagalsha (1925)
- Pagal Premi (1926)
- Diwan Bhamasha (1926)
- Mena Kumari (1926)
- Ra Kawat (1926)
- Samrat Shiladitya (1926)
- Bhamto Bhoot (1926)
- Naseeb Ni Lili (1927)
- Daya Ni Devi (1927)
- Trust Your Wife (1927)
- Wildcat of Bombay (1927)
- Gamdeni Gori (1927)
- Hawai Swar (1929)
- Khwab-e-Hasti (1929)
- Vasantsena (1930)
- Shakuntala (1931)
- Farebi Jaal (1931)
- Lafanga Langoor (1931)
- Veer Kunal (1932)
- Afzal (1933)
- Rangila Rajput (1933)
- Dard-e-Dil (1934)
- Mazdoor (1934)
- Sair-e-Paristan (1934)
- Jung Bahadur (1935)
- Navjeevan (1935)
- Shadi Ki Raat (1935)
- Dilawar (1936)
- Garib Parwar (1936)
- Jagran (1936)
- Zambo the Ape Man (1937)
- Double Cross (1938)
- Himalay Ki Beti (1938)
- Yangrilla (1938)
- Zambo Ka Beta (1939)
- Jhuthi Sharm (1940)
- Prem Nagar (1940)
- Bisvi Sadi (1945)
- Rang Bhoomi (1946)
- Ajit (1948)

=== Documentaries ===
- Mysore, Gem City of India (1929)
- Khedda (1929)
- Wrestling (1936)
- Vale of Kashmir (1949)
- The Private Life of a Silkworm (1950)
- Lest We Forget (1951)
- Festival Time (1951)
- Rajasthan N° 1 (1951)
- Kumaon Hills (1952)
- Folk Dances of India (1953)
- Republic Day Record (1953)
- Feminine Fashions (1954)
- River of Hope (1954)
- Republic Day 1955 (1955)
- Operation Khedda (1956)
- Magic of the Mountains (1957)
- The Himalayan Tapestry (1957)

=== Awards and nominations ===
Year	Award	Category	Work	Result	Ref.
1951	4th Cannes Film Festival	Grand Prix du court métrage	Festival Time	Selected for competition	
1951	4th Cannes Film Festival	Grand Prix du court métrage	The Private Life of a Silk Worm	Selected for competition	
1951	4th Cannes Film Festival	Grand Prix du court métrage	Rajasthan N° 1	Selected for competition	
1953	6th Cannes Film Festival	Short Film Grand Prix	Kumaon Hills	Selected for competition	
1954	7th Cannes Film Festival	Short Film Grand Prix	Feminine Fashions	Selected for competition	
1954	7th Cannes Film Festival	Short Film Grand Prix	Folk Dances of India	Selected for competition	
1954	7th Cannes Film Festival	Short Film Grand Prix	River of Hope	Selected for competition	
1957	10th Cannes Film Festival	Short Film Grand Prix	Magic of the Mountains	Selected for competition	
1957	5th National Film Awards	Best Documentary Film	The Himalayan Tapestry	Won	

== Reception ==
Bhavnani's Mazdoor (1934) has been described by critics as the first realistic portrayal of workers in Bombay cinema. Walter Kaufmann, who composed the music for the film, recalled that the Bhavnani was "not particularly successful with the Indian public because he had too much taste", but described him as "excellent".

Bhavnani's role at the Films Division of India has been a subject of study among documentary film historians. In Films Division and the Indian Documentary (1992), Sanjit Narwekar observed:

Whatever his other attributes, Mohan Bhavnani was no John Grierson. Having been groomed in "the dream factories of Bombay", it is doubtful whether he even had a documentary vision. But at this fledgling stage of Films Division's history it was not a filmmaker who was required at the helm of affairs but someone who could give the new organisation stability and sustenance.

Bhagwan Das Garga wrote in appreciation:

Bhavnani's one undoubted contribution, however, was his vast organisational resourcefulness. He brought order and efficiency in the set-up. He saw to it that newsreels were released in time to retain their "newsiness". He secured the most uptodate equipment for his technicians. In short, he was a capable manager.

== Sources ==
- Balachandran, Anitha (2026). India Animated: Essays on Contemporary Practice. Springer Nature. ISBN 978-3032111791.
- Battaglia, Giulia (2019). Documentary Film in India: An Anthropological History. Routledge. ISBN 978-0367891565.
- Bhatti, Anil; Voigt, Johannes H. (1999). Jewish Exile in India, 1933-1945. Manohar. ISBN 9788173042379.
- Deprez, Camille (2013). "The Films Division of India, 1948–1964: The Early Days and the Influence of the British Documentary Film Tradition". Film History. 25 (3): 149–173. doi:10.2979/filmhistory.25.3.149. ISSN 0892-2160 – via JSTOR.
- Kothari, Jigna; Madangarli, Supriya; Sommya, Bhawana (2012). Mother Maiden Mistress: Women In Hindi Cinema,1950-2010. HarperCollins. ISBN 978-9350294857.
- Narwekar, Sanjit (1992). Films Division and the Indian Documentary. Government of India. Publications Division, Ministry of Information and Broadcasting.
- Narwekar, Sanjit (1994). Directory of Indian Film-makers and Films. Flicks Books. ISBN 978-0948911408.
- Rajadhyaksha, Ashish; Willemen, Paul (1999). The Encyclopedia of Indian Cinema. British Film Institute. ISBN 978-0851706696.
- Ray, Bibekananda (2005). Conscience of The Race. Government of India. Publications Division, Ministry of Information & Broadcasting. ISBN 978-8123026619.
- Sutoris, Peter (2016). Visions of Development: Films Division of India and the Imagination of Progress, 1948–75. Oxford University Press. ISBN 978-1849045711.
