= Walter Kaufmann (composer) =

Austria-Hungarian music composer (1907–1984)

Walter Kaufmann

Walter Kaufmann (1 April 1907 – 9 September 1984) was a Bohemian-born American composer, conductor, ethnomusicologist, librettist and educator. Born in Karlsbad, Bohemia (then part of Austria-Hungary), he trained in Prague and Berlin before fleeing the Nazi persecution of Jews to work in Bombay until Indian independence. He then moved to London and Canada before settling in the U.S. as a professor of musicology at Indiana University Bloomington in 1957. In 1964, he became a naturalized U.S. citizen.

== Biography ==
Kaufmann was born in Karlovy Vary to Julius and Josefine Antonia. He studied at the Hochschule für Musik in Berlin training under Franz Schreker and Curt Sachs between 1927 and 1930. He then studied in Prague under Gustav Becking and Paul Nettl (father of the musicologist Bruno Nettl). While a student he met and became friends with Albert Einstein. He graduated in 1934 with a dissertation on Gustav Mahler but refused a degree in protest of his ordinarius (=professor) Gustav Becking who was a Nazi supporter. For a time he worked as an assistant to the conductor Bruno Walter at the Charlottenburg Opera in Berlin and for Radio Prague and saw some of his earliest compositions played in Carlsbad, Berlin, Wroclaw, Prague and Vienna.

He married Gerti (Gertrude) Hermann (d. 1972), a niece of Franz Kafka and the family fled Nazi Germany in 1934. His father died when the family reached the Czech border. He moved to India and worked as a director of music at the All India Radio in Bombay from 1937 to 1946. His contemporary John Foulds, known for banning the harmonium from Indian radio, worked in New Delhi. He founded the Bombay Chamber Music Society along with others like Mehli Mehta (Kaufmann also taught the Mehtas' son Zubin Mehta). He also researched Indian and Asian music, writing about them in journals. He composed the signature tune for All India Radio in 1936.

Just before the war Kaufmann spent some time in America, unsuccessfully attempting to establish himself there, but ultimately returned to India. During World War II he served in the British Navy and after the war he tried to return to Prague but settled instead in London, arriving in August 1946, where he scored two documentary films for the Rank Organisation and (at the invitation of Adrian Boult) occasionally conducted the BBC Theatre Orchestra. A year later he left England, moving to Nova Scotia, Canada where he taught at the Halifax Conservatory. With the support of by Sir Ernest MacMillan, Kaufmann was invited to become the first professional conductor of the Winnipeg Symphony Orchestra from 1948 to 1956. Divorced from his first wife Gerti, he married the pianist Freda Trepel in 1951. After moving to the United States, he served as a professor of musicology at Indiana University from 1957 until his death in 1984 in Bloomington.

== Music ==
Kaufmann was a prolific composer. There are over eighty works with orchestra in his catalogue, including six symphonies (between 1930 and 1956). There are also eleven numbered string quartets and more than a dozen operas.

Kaufmann adapted to his circumstances. He initially established himself as a composer from 1927 in Prague, Vienna and Berlin with works such as the Symphony No 1, Piano Concerto No 1, Suite for Strings and Five Orchestral Pieces. Once in India he combined Western and Oriental traditions in pieces such as Madras Express, the Six Indian Miniatures and the Violin Concerto No 3, as well as in many chamber works, applying raga techniques in some of them. He also contributed to soundtracks for Bombay's pre-Bollywood film industry with scores such as Jagran (1936), Toofani Tarzan (1937) and Ek Din Ka Sultan (1946).

While in the UK he began to write light music character pieces such as the Fleet Street Tavern overture. In Canada his ballet scores Visages (1948) and The Rose and the Ring (1949) were commissioned by the Royal Winnipeg Ballet, and several large orchestral works were written for the Winnipeg Symphony Orchestra. His wife Freda was the soloist for the premiere of his second Piano Concerto, and Kaufmann invited leading performers such as Glenn Gould and Szymon Goldberg to play with the Winnipeg Symphony. And in the US his opera The Scarlet Letter (after Hawthorne) was very well received at its premiere by the Opera Department of the Indiana University School of Music in the early 1960s.

His scores can be found in The Kaufmann Archive at the William and Gayle Cook Music Library at Indiana University, in Harvard University's Houghton Library., and in the Moldenhauer Archives, Spokane, Washington.

== Selected list of works ==
Opera
- Esther (1931–32)
- Der grosse Dorin (1932)
- Die weiße Göttin (The White Goddess, 1933)
- Der Hammel bringt es an den Tag (1934)
- Anasuya (radio opera, broadcast from Bombay, October I, 1938)
- Bashmachkin (after Gogol) (1933–50) (fp Winnipeg, 1952)
- A Parfait for Irene (1952)
- The Golden Touch, children's opera (1953)
- Christmas Slippers, television opera (1955)
- Sganarelle (1955)
- George from Paradise (1958)
- Paracelsus (1958)
- The Scarlet Letter (1962)
- The Research (1966)
- A Hoosier's Tale (1966) (fp Bloomington, July 30, 1966)
- Rip van Winkle, children's opera (1966)

Ballet

- Visages (1950)
- The Rose and the Ring (1950)
- Wang (1956)

Orchestral

- Suite for Strings (c 1930)
- Five Orchestral Pieces (c 1930)
- Symphony No 1, for strings (1931)
- Prague, suite (1932)
- Symphony No 2 (1935)
- Symphony No 3 (1936)
- Symphony No 4 (1938)
- Symphony No 5 (Sinfonietta No 1) (1940)
- Two Bohemian Dances (1942)
- Six Indian Miniatures (1943)
- Phantasmagoria (1946)
- Dirge (1947)
- Variations for strings (1947)
- Fleet Street overture (1948)
- Faces in the Dark (1948)
- Madras Express (1948) (fp Boston Pops, June 23, 1948)
- Strange Town at Night (1948)
- Divertimento for strings (1949)
- Chivaree Overture (1950)
- Main Street for strings (1950)
- Suwannee River Variations (1952)
- Vaudeville Overture (1952)
- Short Suite for small orchestra (1953)
- Nocturne (1953)
- Pembina Highway (1953)
- Four Skies (1953)
- Three Dances to an Indian Play (1956)
- Four Essays for small orchestra (1956)
- Symphony No 6 (1956)
- Sinfonietta No. 2 (1959)
- Festival Overture (1968)

Concertante

- Piano Concerto No 1 (1934)
- Violin Concerto No 1 (1943)
- Violin Concerto No 2 (1944)
- Navaratnam, suite for piano and chamber orchestra (1945)
- Concertino for piano and strings (1947)
- Andhera for piano and orchestra (1942–49)
- Piano Concerto No 2 (1949) (based on earlier Concertino)
- Cello Concerto (1950)
- Arabesques for two pianos and orchestra (1952)
- Timpani Concerto (1963)
- Concertino for violin and orchestra (1977)

Vocal

- Galizische Bäume, cantata for chorus and orchestra (1932)
- Kalif Storch, fairy tale for speaker and orchestra (1951)
- Coronation Cantata for soloists, chorus and orchestra (1953)
- Rubayyat for soloist and orchestra (1954)

Chamber

- String Quartet No.7 (before 1939)
- String Quartet No.11 (before 1939)
- Three Piano Trios (1942-1946)
- Violin Sonata No.2, Op.44 (before 1946)
- Violin Sonatina No.12 (also arr. clarinet and piano (before 1946)
- Septet (before 1946)
- Six Pieces for piano trio (1957)
- String Quartet (1961)
- Arabesques for flute, oboe, harpsichord, and bass (1963)
- Partita for woodwind quintet (1963)
- Eight Pieces for 12 Instruments (1967)
- Passacaglia and Capriccio for brass sextet (1967)
- Sonatina for piccolo or flute solo (1968)

Piano

- Concertino (1932)
- Sonatina (1948) (recorded by Rose Goldblatt)
- Piano Sonata (1948–51)
- Arabesques for Two Pianos (1952)
- Sonatina (1956)
- Suite (1957)

Films

- Jaagran, India, Hindi (1936)

Books

- Altindien (Musikgeschichte in Bildern, Bd. 2; Musik des Altertums, Lfg. 8. Leipzig, Deutscher Verlag für Musik, 1981)
- Musical Notations of the Orient: Notational Systems of Continental, East, South and Central Asia (Indiana University Humanities Series, no. 60. Bloomington, Indiana University Press, 1967)
- Musical References in the Chinese Classics (Detroit, Information Coordinators, 1976)
- The Ragas of North India (Bloomington, Indiana University Press, 1968)
- The Ragas of South India: A Catalogue of Scalar Material (Bloomington, Indiana University Press, 1976)
- Selected Musical Terms of Non-Western Cultures: A Notebook-Glossary (Detroit Studies in Music Bibliography, no. 65. Warren, MI, Harmonie Park Press, 1990)
- Tibetan Buddhist Chant: Musical Notations and Interpretations of a Song Book by the Bkah Brgyud Pa and Sa Skya Pa Sects (Translated by T. Norbu. Indiana University Humanities Series, no. 70. Bloomington, Indiana University Press, 1975)

He also published a number of research papers and record reviews especially in ethnomusicology. After coming in contact with Verrier Elwin, he studied Gond music.

== Recordings ==
Madras Express, Indian Facades - A Solemn Rhapsody for Orchestra, Symphony No. 2, Dirge. Regensburg Philharmonic Orchestra cond. Stefan Veselka (MDG). www.mdg.de

Chamber Works by Walter Kaufmann. ARC Ensemble (Chandos)

Piano Concerto No. 3, Symphony No. 3, An Indian Symphony, Six Indian Miniatures. Berlin Radio Symphony Orchestra cond. David Robert Coleman (CPO). Review by Norman Lebrecht Review by Jonathan Woolf
