= Sulochana Latkar filmography =

Sulochana Latkar (30 July 1928 – 4 June 2023) was an Indian actress in Marathi and Hindi cinema. Mostly known by her screen name, Sulochana, she has starred in 50 Marathi films and approximately 250 Hindi films. She is best known for her performances in Marathi films such as Meeth Bhakar (1949), Vahininchya Bangdya (1953), and Dhakti Jaao (1958), as well as roles in Hindi films such as Dil Deke Dekho (1959). She and fellow actor Nirupa Roy epitomised the mother roles from 1959 until the early 1990s.

The Hindustan Times published an article in January 2019 talking about one of Sulochana's mother roles.

== Hindi ==
Year	Movie name	Role
1944	Maharathi Karna	Sulochana
1946	Jag Biti	Sister
1948	Nai Reet	
1949	Paras	Champa
1954	Gawaiya	
1954	Lakeeren	
1954	Mahatma Kabir	Kabir's wife
1954	Suhagan	
1955	Bindiya	
1956	Parivar	
1956	Sati Anusuya	
1956	Sudarshan Chakra	
1957	Ab Dilli Dur Nahin	Bela
1957	Gauri Shankar	
1958	Naya Kadam	
1958	Gaj Gauri	
1959	Dil Deke Dekho	Jamuna
1959	Do Ustad	Jagannath's Wife
1959	Duniya Na Mane	Meera
1959	Sati Vaishalini	Vaishalini
1959	Sujata	Charu Chowdhury
1960	Aayee Phir Bahar	
1960	Babar	
1960	Bhakt Raj	Jamuna
1960	Dil Apna Aur Preet Parai	
1960	Jis Desh Mein Ganga Behti Hai	
1960	Ek Phool Char Kante	
1960	Mohabbat Ki Jeet	
1961	Amrit Manthan	
1961	Bhabhi Ki Chudiyan	
1961	Do Bhai	
1961	Jab Pyar Kise Se Hota Hai	
1961	Mem Didi	
1961	Reshmi Rumal	
1961	Sampoorna Ramayana	
1962	Babar	
1962	Gangu	
1962	Hawa Mahal	
1962	Jhoola	
1962	Meri Behen	
1962	Naughty Boy	
1962	Reporter Raju	
1962	Shola Aur Shabnam	
1962	Soorat Aur Seerat	
1962	Umar Qaid	
1963	Akela	
1963	Bandini	
1963	Bharosa	
1963	Ek Dil Sau Afsane	
1963	Gul-E-Bakawali	
1963	Holiday In Bombay	
1963	Sunehri Nagin	
1963	Taj Mahal	
1964	Pooja Ke Phool	
1964	Sant Dnyaseshwar	
1964	Sharabi (1964 film)	
1964	Ziddi	
1965	Bharat Milap	
1965	Faisla	
1965	Jahan Sati Wahin Bhagawan	
1965	Johar Mehmood In Goa	
1965	Neela Aakash	
1965	Nishan	
1965	Shanker Seeta Anusuya	
1965	Shree Ram Bharat Milap	
1965	Teen Deviyan	
1966	Chhota Bhai	
1966	Devar	
1966	Laadla	
1966	Pyar Mohabbat	
1967	Baharon Ke Sapne	
1967	Gunehgaar	
1967	Nai Roshni	
1967	Raat Aur Din	
1968	Aadmi	
1968	Abhilasha	
1968	Aulad	
1968	Har Har Gange	
1968	Milan Ki Raat	
1968	Parivar	
1968	Saraswati Chandra	
1968	Sunghursh	
1969	Aya Sawan Jhoom Ke	
1969	Beti	
1969	Bhai Bahen	
1969	Chiraag	
1969	Doli	
1969	Ek Masoom	
1969	Ek Shriman Ek Shrimati	
1969	Pyar Hi Pyar	
1969	Sambandh	
1969	Suhag Raat	
1969	Talash	
1969	Tamanna	
1970	Bhagwan Parshuram	
1970	Darpan	
1970	Devi	
1970	Ehsan	
1970	Johny Mera Naam	
1970	My Love	
1970	Pardesi	
1970	Pehchan	
1970	Rootha Na Karo	
1970	Tum Haseen Main Jawan	
1970	Veer Ghatotkach	
1971	Bombay Talkies	
1971	Brahma Vishnu Mahesh	
1971	Duniya Kya Jane	
1971	Jane Anjane	
1971	Kati Patang	
1971	Ladki Pasand Hai	
1971	Lakhon Mein Ek	
1971	Main Sunder Hoon	
1971	Reshma Aur Shera	
1971	Seema	
1971	Sharmeelee	
1972	Baharon Phool Barsao	
1972	Banke Lal	
1972	Beimaan	
1972	Gora Aur Kala	
1972	Jeet	
1972	Mere Jeevan Saathi	
1972	Piya Ka Ghar	
1972	Rakhi Aur Hathkadi	
1972	Rampur Ka Lakshman	
1972	Wafa	
1973	Dil Ki Rahen	
1973	Gai Aur Gauri	
1973	Joshila	
1973	Kahani Kismat Ki	
1974	Aahat	
1974	Aap Ki Kasam	
1974	Ameer Garib	
1974	Free Love	
1974	International Crook	
1974	Kasauti	
1974	Kora Kagaz	
1974	Majboor	
1974	Mehmaan	
1974	Nirmaan	
1974	Roti Kapada Aur Makan	
1974	Vachan	
1975	Aaja Sanam	
1975	Aakraman	
1975	Dharmatma	
1975	Do Thug	
1975	Faraar	
1975	Sanyasi	
1975	Warrant	
1976	Bhanwar	
1976	Khaan Dost	
1976	Nagin	
1976	Raees	
1977	Aashiq Hoon Baharon Ka	
1978	Muqaddar Ka Sikandar	
1979	Ratan Deep	
1980	Dostana	
1981	Yaarana	Bishan's Mother
1981	Krodhi	Mrs. Sahani
1981	Prem Geet	
1981	Sampoorna Santoshi Maa Ki Mahima	
1982	Bhagya	
1982	Jeevan Dhara	Parvati Shrivastava
1983	Himmatwala	Govind's Grandmother
1983	Phulwari	Rajiv's Mother
1984	Andar Baahar	Ravi's Mother
1984	Divorce	Mrs. Oswal
1984	Raj Tilak	Bhavani Singh
1985	Ghulami	Mrs. Singh
1986	Kala Dhandha Gorey Log	Badi Maa
1986	Ghar Sansar	Laxmi
1988	Khoon Bhari Maang	J.D's Mother
1993	Pyar Pyar	Rajkumar's (Kiran Kumar) mother
2003	Tada	Ajay and Vijay's Mother
2007	Pareeksha	

== Marathi ==
Year	Film	Role	Notes
1943	Chimukla Sansar	Sulochana	Debut film
1946	Sasurvaas	Sulochana	
1948	Jeevacha Sakha	Chandra Deshmukh	First lead role
1949	Paras	Champa	
1949	Meeth Bhakar		
1950	Dev Pavala	Saru	
1950	Bala Jo Jo Re	Brahman Girl	
1951	Shiva Ramoshi	Shiva's Wife	
1951	Stree Janma Tuzi Hi Kahani	Usha	
1952	Chimani Pakhare	Sharda Savale	
1952	Chhatrapati Shivaji	Saibai	
1953	Vahininchya Bangdya	Vahini	
1954	Mahatma Phule	Savitribai Phule	
1955	Bhaubeej	Chandrabai	
1956	Sati Anusaya	Anusaya	
1958	Sukhache Sobti	Geeta	
1959	Sati Vaishalini	Vaishalini	
1959	Sangtye Aika	Hansa	
1961	Prapanch	Paru Kumbhar	Maharashtra State Film Award for Best Actress
1963	Molkarin	Radha	
1963	Chhota Jawan	Aai	
1964	Maratha Tituka Melvava	Jijabai	
1965	Vavtal	Aai	
1965	Sadhi Mansa	Vahinibai	
1965	Laxmi Aali Ghara	Laxmi	
1967	Sant Gora Kumbhar	Gora's Wife	
1968	Khandobachi Aan	Paro	
1968	Ekati	Madhu's mother	
1968	Gharchi Rani	Rani	
1969	Manaacha Mujra	Kondli	
1971	Mai Maauli	Mauli	
1973	Varhadi Aani Vajantri	Govinda's mother	
1975	Preet Tujhi Majhi		
1975	Pandoba Porgi Phasali	Pandoba's Mother	
1976	Pudhari	Aaisaheb	
1979	Bhala Manus	Anand's Wife	
1980	Savli Premachi		
1981	Soon Mazi Laxmi	Dhondiba's Wife	
1981	Satichi Punyayee	Sheila's Mother	
1982	Laxmichi Paule	Prakash's Mother	
1982	Ek Daav Bhutacha	Radha Mavshi	
1982	Bhannat Bhanu	Savitribai	
1983	Kashala Udyachi Baat	Mrs. Faujdar	
1984	Sasu Varchadh Jawai	Yashoda Gawli	
1986	Bijli	Janaki	
