= Shammi Kapoor filmography =

Indian actor

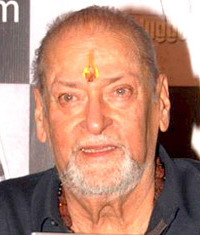
Kapoor at the launch of Shammi Kapoor Unplugged (2010)

Shammi Kapoor (born Shamsher Raj Kapoor; (pronounced [ʃʌmːi kʌpuːɾ]; 21 October 1931 – 14 August 2011) was an Indian actor known for his work in Hindi cinema. Kapoor is considered as one of the greatest and most successful actors in the history of Indian cinema. In a career spanning over five decades, Kapoor worked in over 100 films. He is the recipient of three Filmfare Awards, including one for Best Actor.

Born to actor Prithviraj Kapoor and a member of the Kapoor family, he made his film debut with the commercially unsuccessful Jeewan Jyoti (1953). Following roles in continued box-office flops, he had his breakthrough with Tumsa Nahin Dekha (1957), which attained him the image of a stylish playboy and dancer, and subsequently gained further recognition with Dil Deke Dekho (1959). Kapoor rose to widespread recognition with the romantic blockbuster Junglee (1961), and went on to become one of the most marketable Bollywood stars throughout the 1960s, appearing in a number of highly successful films such as - Professor (1962), Dil Tera Deewana (1962), China Town (1962), Rajkumar (1964), Kashmir Ki Kali (1964), Janwar (1965), Teesri Manzil (1966), An Evening In Paris (1967), Brahmachari (1968) and Prince (1969). For Brahmachari, he won the Filmfare Award for Best Actor.

Following his leading role in Andaz (1971), he began to appear in supporting roles. His notable such roles include - Parvarish (1977), Prem Rog (1982), Vidhaata (1982), Betaab (1983), Hero (1983), Sohni Mahiwal (1984), Wanted (1984), Hukumat (1987), Daata (1989), Tahalka (1992), Chamatkar (1992), Gardish (1993) and Rockstar (2011), which was his final film. For Vidhaata, he won the Filmfare Award for Best Supporting Actor. Apart from acting, Kapoor is widely considered among the best dancers.

== Films ==
| Year | Title | Role | Notes | Ref. |
|---|---|---|---|---|
| 1953 | Jeewan Jyoti | Shyam Sundar "Shammi" | Debut Film | |
| 1953 | Rail Ka Dibba | Sundar | | |
| 1953 | Thokar | | | |
| 1953 | Laila Majnu | Qais / Majnu | | |
| 1953 | Gul Sanobar | Prince Badar | | |
| 1954 | Shama Parwana | Gul Mirza | | |
| 1954 | Chor Bazar | Prince Murad / Salim | | |
| 1954 | Mehbooba | Rashid | | |
| 1954 | Ehsan | | | |
| 1954 | Sahil | | | |
| 1955 | Tongawali | | | |
| 1955 | Miss Coca Cola | Kamal | | |
| 1955 | Naqab | Anwar | | |
| 1955 | Daku | Badal | | |
| 1956 | Sipahsalar | Captain | | |
| 1956 | Rangeen Raten | Moti Singh | | |
| 1956 | Mem Sahib | Manohar | | |
| 1956 | Ham Sab Chor Hain | Nath | | |
| 1957 | Tumsa Nahin Dekha | Shankar | | |
| 1957 | Mirza Sahiban | Mirza Khan | | |
| 1957 | Maharani | | | |
| 1957 | Coffee House | | | |
| 1958 | Mujrim | Shankar / Anand | Double Role | |
| 1959 | Mohar | | | |
| 1959 | Ujala | Ramu | | |
| 1959 | Raat Ke Rahi | Bobby | | |
| 1959 | Dil Deke Dekho | Roop / Raja | | |
| 1959 | Char Dil Char Rahen | Johny Braganza | | |
| 1960 | Singapore | Shyam | | |
| 1960 | College Girl | Shyam | | |
| 1960 | Basant | Asim | | |
| 1961 | Junglee | Chandrashekhar "Shekhar" | | |
| 1961 | Boy Friend | Madan / Shyam | | |
| 1962 | Dil Tera Deewana | Mohan | | |
| 1962 | Professor | Professor Preetam Khanna | | |
| 1962 | China Town | Shekhar / Shankar / Mike | Double Role | |
| 1962 | Vallah Kya Baat Hai | Kundan | | |
| 1963 | Jab Se Tumhe Dekha Hai | Qawwali Singer | Guest Appearance along with Shashi Kapoor | |
| 1963 | Shaheed Bhagat Singh | Bhagat Singh | | |
| 1963 | Pyar Kiya To Darna Kya | Rajesh | | |
| 1963 | Bluff Master | Ashok | | |
| 1964 | Rajkumar | Prince Bhanupratap / Bhagatram | | |
| 1964 | Kashmir Ki Kali | Rajeev Lal | | |
| 1965 | Janwar | Sundar Shrivastav | | |
| 1966 | Preet Na Jane Reet | Ashok / Mohan | | |
| 1966 | Teesri Manzil | Anil Kumar "Sona" / Rocky | | |
| 1966 | Budtameez | Shyam Kumar Saxena | | |
| 1967 | An Evening in Paris | Shyam Kumar "Sam" | | |
| 1967 | Latt Saheb | Jangu | | |
| 1968 | Brahmachari | Brahmachari | | |
| 1969 | Prince | Prince Shamsher Singh | | |
| 1969 | Tumse Achha Kaun Hai | Ashok | | |
| 1969 | Sachaai | Ashok | | |
| 1970 | Pagla Kahin Ka | Sujit | | |
| 1971 | Jawan Muhabat | Rajesh Sareen | | |
| 1971 | Jane Anjane | Ram Prasad "Ramu" | | |
| 1971 | Preetam | Preetam | | |
| 1971 | Andaz | Ravi | | |
| 1974 | Chhote Sarkaar | Raja / Moti | Double Role | |
| 1974 | Manoranjan | Dhoop Chhaon "Dhopu" | Also Director | |
| 1975 | Zameer | Maharaj Singh | | |
| 1975 | Salaakhen | Truck Driver | Cameo | |
| 1976 | Bundalbaaz | Genie | Also Director | |
| 1977 | Parvarish | DSP Shamsher Singh | | |
| 1977 | Mama Bhanja | Shankar Lal | | |
| 1978 | Shalimar | Dr. Dubari | | |
| 1979 | Meera | Raja Vikramjeet Singh Sesodia | | |
| 1979 | Ahsaas | Sudarshan Sahni | | |
| 1981 | Biwi-O-Biwi | Campa Cola Truck Driver | Cameo | |
| 1981 | Naseeb | Himself | Cameo | |
| 1981 | Rocky | Himself | Cameo | |
| 1981 | Harjaee | Rajnath | | |
| 1981 | Armaan | Sam | | |
| 1981 | Ahista Ahista | Sagar | | |
| 1981 | Professor Pyarelal | Mr. Rai | | |
| 1982 | Yeh Vaada Raha | Dr. Mehra | | |
| 1982 | Desh Premee | Shamsher Singh | | |
| 1982 | Prem Rog | Bade Thakur | | |
| 1982 | Vidhaata | Gurbaksh Singh | | |
| 1983 | Romance | Mr. Roy | | |
| 1983 | Betaab | Sardar Dinesh Singh Girji | | |
| 1983 | Hero | Retired IG Shreekant Mathur | | |
| 1983 | Ek Jaan Hain Hum | Advocate Shyam Sundar Saxena | | |
| 1984 | Wanted | Inspector Bheem Singh | | |
| 1984 | Aan Aur Shaan | Bade Thakur | | |
| 1984 | Sohni Mahiwal | Peer Baba | | |
| 1985 | Ram Tere Kitne Nam | Film Director | Cameo | |
| 1985 | Ek Se Bhale Do | William | | |
| 1985 | Balidaan | Retired Major Prem Kishan | | |
| 1985 | Baadal | Thakur Shamsher Singh | | |
| 1986 | Kala Dhanda Goray Log | Qawwali Singer | Guest Appearance | |
| 1986 | Karamdaata | Rai Bahadur | | |
| 1986 | Allah Rakha | Karim Khan | | |
| 1987 | Hukumat | DIG Khan | | |
| 1987 | Ijaazat | Mahendra's Grandfather | | |
| 1987 | Himmat Aur Mehanat | Madan | | |
| 1989 | Bade Ghar Ki Beti | Thakur Dindayal | | |
| 1989 | Daata | DIG Sher Ali Khan | | |
| 1989 | Batwara | Bade Thakur | | |
| 1989 | Mohabat Ka Paigham | Chaudhary Abdul Rehman | | |
| 1990 | Dhadaka | Singer | Marathi Film; Guest Appearance along with Raj Kapoor | |
| 1991 | Henna | Narrator | | |
| 1991 | Ajooba | Sultan / Peer Baba | | |
| 1991 | Mast Kalandar | Rai Bahadur Pratap Singh | | |
| 1991 | Lakshmanrekha | Baba Sahib | | |
| 1992 | Khule-Aam | Sikandar / Bhola | | |
| 1992 | Tahalka | Brigadier Kapoor | | |
| 1992 | Chamatkar | R. K. Kaul | | |
| 1992 | Humshakal | Police Commissioner Dindayal Kapoor | | |
| 1992 | Heer Ranjha | Chochak Chaudhary | | |
| 1992 | Amaran | Don Miranda | Tamil Film | |
| 1992 | Mahashay | Prem Singh Chadda | Bengali Film | |
| 1993 | Mangni | Professor Gautam | Special Appearance | |
| 1993 | Gardish | Prithviraj Bhalla | | |
| 1993 | Aaja Meri Jaan | Mr. Kapoor | | |
| 1993 | Dosti Ki Saugandh | Thakur Ram Singh | | |
| 1993 | Tum Karo Vaada | St. Micheal | | |
| 1994 | Pyar Ka Rog | Colonel Kapoor | | |
| 1994 | Prem Yog | Maharaj Chhatrapal Singh | | |
| 1994 | Sukham Sukhakaram | | Malayalam Film | |
| 1995 | Rock Dancer | Dance Master | | |
| 1996 | Megha | Bhanupratap | | |
| 1996 | Prem Granth | Nandlal | | |
| 1996 | Namak | Lala Kedarnath Sharma | | |
| 1997 | Aur Pyar Ho Gaya | Mr. Kapoor | | |
| 1997 | Share Bazaar | Hasmukh Mehta | | |
| 1998 | Kareeb | Thakur Ranveer Singh | | |
| 1998 | Swami Vivekananda | Alwar Maharaja Mangal Singh | | |
| 1998 | Dhoondte Reh Jaaoge! | Auctioneer | | |
| 1999 | Sar Ankhon Par | Himself | Guest Appearance | |
| 1999 | Jaanam Samjha Karo | Dadaji | | |
| 2001 | Censor | Judge | | |
| 2001 | Shirdi Sai Baba | Devoted Singer | Cameo | |
| 2002 | Yeh Hai Jalwa | Industrialist | Cameo | |
| 2002 | Waah..! Tera Kya Kehna | Krishna Oberoi | | |
| 2004 | Bhola In Bollywood | | | |
| 2006 | Sandwich | Swami Trilokanand | | |
| 2011 | Rockstar | Ustad Jameel Khan | Final Film | |

== Television ==
| Year | Title | Role | Notes | Ref. |
|---|---|---|---|---|
| 1993 | Bible Ki Kahaniyan | Nimrod | TV debut | |
