= M. S. Shinde =

Indian film editor (1929–2012)

- Shinde with his Filmfare Award
- Born: 30 November 1929
- Died: 28 September 2012 (aged 82); Mumbai, Maharashtra, India
- Occupation: Film editor
- Years active: 1960 - 1995
- Notable work: Sholay
- Spouse: Prafula Shinde
- Children: 3
- Awards: Filmfare Award for Best Editing

Madhav S Shinde (30 November 1929 – 28 September 2012), credited as M. S. Shinde, was a Bollywood film editor who edited over 100 films, notably the cult hit Sholay (1975). Other notables films he worked on include Seeta Aur Geeta, Brahmachari, Shaan and Chamatkar. He received the Filmfare Best Editor award for Sholay in 1975.

== Career ==
Shinde started his career as an editor for Bollywood films in 1960s. Even before editing the classic 1975 release film Sholay, Shinde had worked with director Ramesh Sippy and producer G. P. Sippy on the 1972 film Seeta Aur Geeta starring Hema Malini. Shinde worked for a monthly salary of ₹2,000 for the Sippys' production house. His work on Sholay of editing 300,000 feet of reel into 18,000 feet is considered remarkable. The earlier submitted version of 21,000 feet long film was further edited after the censors mandated cuts. The film had been reduced to a running time of 3 hours and 20 minutes, and was now without many of its gory scenes, though violence remained both on- and off-screen. Sholay was nominated in nine categories at the 23rd Filmfare Awards but won only the Best Editing Award.

Shinde worked on over 100 Bollywood films. The list of his works includes some successful films like Raaz (1967), Brahmachari (1968), Shaan (1980), Shakti (1982), Razia Sultan (1983), Sohni Mahiwal (1984), Saagar (1985) and Chamatkar (1992). His last film was Zamaana Deewana (1995), starring Shahrukh Khan. Along with films, Shinde was also the editor of the Hindi television classic Buniyaad that aired on DD National in 1986.

=== Partial filmography ===
- 1960 Bewaqoof
- 1961 Razia Sultana
- 1961 Mr. India
- 1965 Mere Sanam
- 1966 Dillagi
- 1967 Raaz
- 1968 Brahmachari
- 1969 Ek Shrimaan Ek Shrimati
- 1969 Bandhan
- 1970 Tum Haseen Main Jawan
- 1971 Preetam
- 1972 Seeta Aur Geeta
- 1973 Heera
- 1973 Jheel Ke Us Paar
- 1974 Jurm Aur Sazaa
- 1974 5 Rifles
- 1975 Sholay
- 1976 Bhanwar
- 1977 Chalta Purza
- 1978 Karmayogi
- 1978 Nasbandi
- 1978 Ganga Ki Saugand
- 1978 Trishna
- 1980 Abdullah
- 1980 Alibaba Aur 40 Chor
- 1980 Shaan
- 1981 Jail Yatra
- 1982 Ashanti
- 1982 Dharam Kanta
- 1982 Shakti
- 1983 Bade Dil Wala
- 1984 Sohni Mahiwal
- 1985 Haveli
- 1985 Yaadon Ki Kasam
- 1985 Saagar
- 1986 Love and God
- 1986 Jumbish: A Movement - The Movie
- 1986 Avinash
- 1988 Aakhri Adaalat
- 1988 Kasam
- 1989 Mujrim
- 1989 Guru
- 1989 Bhrashtachar
- 1991 Shikari: The Hunter
- 1991 Begunaah
- 1991 Akayla
- 1992 Chamatkar
- 1995 Ram Jaane
- 1995 Zamaana Deewana

== Awards ==
Shinde has won Filmfare Awards in the category of Best Editing for the film Sholay (1975).

== Personal life ==
Shinde was married to Prafula Shinde, who died in 2006 of cancer. They have three daughters. Due to his poor economic conditions he faced problems in getting timely medical help. The cine wing "Maharashtra Navnirman Chitrapat Karmachari Sena" of Maharashtra Navnirman Sena had helped Shinde by providing financial aid.
