= Manmohan (actor) =

Indian actor

- Manmohan in the movie Purab Aur Pachhim
- Born: 28 January 1933; Jamshedpur, Bihar and Orissa Province, British India
- Died: 26 August 1979 (aged 46); Jamshedpur, India
- Occupations: Actor, producer
- Years active: 1963–1979
- Known for: Gumnaam, Aandhi
- Children: Nitin Manmohan (Producer)

Manmohan was an Indian actor of Bollywood, well known for his role as a villain. He also worked in Bengali, Gujarati and Punjabi films. He also acted in Movie Raja Rani, released in 1973. He was a regular in Rajesh Khanna's movies.

== Early life ==
He was born and brought up in Jamshedpur. Manmohan came from a well-to-do family, who had their own business. Totally different from his other three brothers, he was very keen on becoming an actor from childhood. His son Nitin Manmohan was a producer, who produced films like Bol Radha Bol (1992), Laadla (1994), Deewangee (2001) and Bhoot (2003) etc.

== Film career ==
He moved to Bombay in 1950 and got acquainted with then personalities like Shankar-Jaikishen, Bhappi Sonie and G. P. Sippy. His close association with Jaikishen got him known to Keval Kayshap who cast him in his first film Shaheed. He was also in all of Bhappi Sonie's films. Through Bhappi Sonie, he met Shakti Samanta, Pramod Chakravarty and Manoj Kumar. Then he got N. N. Sippy's film Gumnaam. He was at the top of his acting career in the '70s.

== Death ==
While filming a movie in a village in Maharashtra alongside actor Manoj Kumar, the crew encountered a lack of electricity in the area. The entire team was residing in the village during the shoot. Due to the absence of electric power, Manmohan relied on a petromax lamp at night. The lamp exploded while he was asleep, causing a fire in which Manmohan sustained severe burn injuries covering 80% of his body. He was immediately rushed to the hospital, where doctors performed surgery. However, he never recovered from his injuries and died on 26 August 1979.

== Filmography ==
Year	Title	Role	Notes
1963	Yeh Rastey Hain Pyar Ke	Vendor	
1965	Zindagi Aur Maut		
1965	Shaheed	Chandra Shekhar Azad	
1965	Janwar	Traffic Police	
1965	Gumnaam	Kishan	
1966	Mera Saaya	Doctor	
1966	Yeh Zindagi Kitni Haseen Hai		
1966	Neend Hamari Khwab Tumhare	Nawab Shaukat Hamid Khan	
1966	Mohabbat Zindagi Hai	Preetam	
1967	Upkar	Kavita's Brother	
1967	Parivar	Bashir, Bengali Taxi Driver	
1967	Naunihal	Ustad Mansharam	
1967	Aag	Police Inspector	
1968	Brahmachari	Basant	
1968	Baazi	Poor Man Supported by Da Silva	
1968	Shikar	Robbie	
1968	Parivar	Bashir	
1968	Kahin Din Kahin Raat	Jack	
1968	Aulad	Suraj / Arun	
1969	Bandish	Shanker	
1969	Aradhana	Shyam	
1969	Vishwas	Mohan	
1969	Tumse Acha Kaun Hai		
1969	Satyakam	Kunver Vikram Singh	
1969	Pyar Hi Pyar	Shyam Kumar	
1969	Do Bhai	Ramesh	
1969	Dharti Kahe Pukar Ke		
1970	Prem Pujari	Chinese Army Officer	
1970	Heer Raanjha		
1970	Yaadgaar		
1970	Purab Aur Pachhim	Mohan	
1970	Pardesi	Tikora	
1970	Maharaja		
1970	Humjoli	Manmohan	
1970	Aansoo Aur Muskan	Mahesh's boss	
1971	Upaasna		
1971	Ek Din Aadhi Raat		
1971	Preetam	Pyare	
1971	Naya Zamana	Ashok	
1971	Mera Gaon Mera Desh		
1971	Ladki Pasand Hai	Kundan	
1971	Kathputli	Nisha's Boss	
1971	Duniya Kya Jaane		
1971	Balidaan	Vijay Singh	
1972	Manavata	Rangili's Father	
1972	Kanch Aur Heera		
1972	Amar Prem	Ram Ratan	
1972	Bombay to Goa	Verma	
1972	Lalkaar	Japanese Army Officer	
1972	Ek Nazar		
1972	Yaar Mera	Manmohan / Man	
1972	Shor	Kabrastan Ke Raja	
1972	Raja Jani	Latpat Seth	
1972	Double Cross	Card-sharp	
1973	Raja Rani	Shankar Dada	
1973	Loafer	Singh's Agent	
1973	Anhonee	Dr. Mathur	
1973	Daag: A Poem of Love	Prisoner in van	
1973	Jugnu	Mike	
1973	Namak Haraam	Jai Singh	
1973	Shareef Budmaash	Gulab Singh	
1973	Jalte Badan	Drugs Seller	
1973	Heera Panna	Veeru	
1973	Gaddaar	Mohan	
1973	Gaai Aur Gori	Mohini's Brother	
1973	Chhalia	Mac	
1973	Anokhi Ada	Shambhu	
1974	Nirmaan	Manmohan Khanna	
1974	Geetaa Mera Naam	Man who betrays Johnny	
1974	Prem Nagar	Lata's boss	
1974	Anjaan Raahen	Rajoo	
1974	Ajanabee	Sinha	
1974	Roti Kapada Aur Makaan	Senior police officer	
1974	Raja Kaka		
1974	Jeevan Sangram		
1974	Humshakal	Street Rowdy	
1974	Dil Diwana	Pyarelal	
1974	Charitraheen		
1975	Rafoo Chakkar	#4 Duo	
1975	Aandhi	S. K. Agarwal	
1975	Amanush	Sanathan	
1975	Vandana	Smuggler	
1975	Umar Qaid	Actor	Uncredited
1976	Ek Se Badhkar Ek	Tony	
1976	Zindagi	Manjit Verma	
1976	Maha Chor	Prem's goon	
1976	Barood	Jagdish	
1976	Aaj Ka Mahaatma	Shankar	
1977	Dhoop Chhaon	Mangal	
1977	Chhailla Babu	Group #2	
1977	Kotwal Saab	Inspector Thakur	
1977	Chalta Purza	Manmohan	
1977	Hatyara	Bankelal 'Banke'	
1978	Jalan		
1978	Chor Ke Ghar Chor	Mac	
1978	Chowki No.11		
1979	Sarkari Mehmaan	Somi	
1979	Jaandaar		
1979	Bebus		
1980	Be-Reham	Ghanshyam	
1980	Neeyat	Mohanlal's Associate	
1981	Kranti	Darmiyan Singh	
1983	Daulat Ke Dushman	Mac Mohan	
1986	Teesra Kinara		
1990	Jaan-E-Wafa		(final film role)
