= Nishchaiy =

Nishchay
- DVD cover
- Directed by: Esmayeel Shroff
- Produced by: Bhappi Sonie
- Starring: Vinod Khanna; Salman Khan; Karisma Kapoor
- Cinematography: Jal Mistry
- Music by: O. P. Nayyar
- Release date: 17 July 1992
- Running time: 148 minutes
- Country: India
- Language: Hindi

Nishchaiy is a 1992 Indian Hindi-language film directed by Esmayeel Shroff and released in 1992. The film stars Vinod Khanna, Salman Khan, Karisma Kapoor and Moushumi Chatterjee in key roles.

== Plot ==
Ravi Yadav is the servant of Manohar Singh. He wants to make his younger brother Rohan a lawyer. Manohar's wife Renuka teaches Ravi English to help him but this makes Manohar insecure. Ravi is falsely accused of raping his girlfriend Parvati, and sentenced to prison.

12 years later when Ravi comes out of prison, he is unable to locate Rohan. Rohan has been adopted by lawyer Gujral and his wife Yashoda, and is a well known lawyer with the name Vasudev Gujral. Vasudev is in love with Payal Singh, Manohar's daughter.

Ravi meets Renuka who has lost her memory after Manohar tried to kill her. Manohar is unaware that Renuka is alive. Ravi starts medical treatment for Renuka. To earn the needed money, he accepts a contract to kill Vasudev Gujral who has allegedly raped and killed his girlfriend.

When Ravi goes to kill Vasudev he realizes his true identity and stops. But Vasudev catches him and gets him arrested. Renuka's memory returns and she rushes to the police station. Payal is reunited with her mother and confronts her father. Manohar traps his own daughter. Ravi gets shot by Manohar. Renuka wants to kill Manohar, but Ravi stops her.

== Cast ==
- Vinod Khanna as Ravi Yadav
- Salman Khan as Rohan Yadav / Advocate Vasudev Gujral
- Karishma Kapoor as Payal Singh
- Moushumi Chatterjee as Renuka Singh
- Saeed Jaffrey as Advocate Suryakant Gujral
- Reema Lagoo as Yashoda Gujral
- Roopa Ganguly as Vidya
- Sudha Chandran as Judy Martin
- Sonu Walia as Parvati "Paro"
- Rajeev Verma as Manohar Singh
- Goga Kapoor as Ruffian
- Avtar Gill as Dheerendra Thakur
- Mahesh Anand as Joseph Lobo
- Javed Khan as Parvati's Brother-in-law
- Ramesh Deo as Ravi's Lawyer
- Kamaldeep as Judge
- Kishore Bhanushali as Prashant
- Krishan Dhawan as Bal Gopal
- Prem Sagar as Police Officer Vinayak

== Music ==
Nishchaiy

Studio album by O. P. Nayyar
- Released: 1992 (India)
- Genre: Feature film soundtrack
- Label: Venus Records & Tapes
- Producer: O. P. Nayyar

O. P. Nayyar chronology
| Muqaddar Ki Baat (1983) | Nishchaiy (1992) | Zid (1994) |

The soundtrack of the film contains 6 songs. The music was composed by O. P. Nayyar, who had last done the music for a film in 1983, the lyrics written by Qamar Jalalabadi.

When the Venus company distributed the music for the film they were excited for O. P. Nayyar making a return to composing soundtracks for Hindi films. However the soundtrack did not do very well.

| Song | Singer |
|---|---|
| "Chal Mere Ghode" | Mohammed Aziz |
| "Chhutti Kar Di Meri" | Kavita Krishnamurthy |
| "Sun Mere Sajna" | Kavita Krishnamurthy, Amit Kumar |
| "Dekho Dekho Tum" | Kavita Krishnamurthy, Amit Kumar |
| "Nayi Suraahi, Taaza Paani" | Kavita Krishnamurthy, Amit Kumar |
| "Kisi Haseen Yaar Ki Talaash Hai" | Kavita Krishnamurthy, Amit Kumar |
