= Jheel Ke Us Paar =

- Poster
- Directed by: Bhappi Sonie
- Written by: Nabendu Ghosh; Gulshan Nanda; Ramesh Pant
- Produced by: Bhappi Sonie
- Starring: Dharmendra; Mumtaz; Yogeeta Bali; Pran
- Cinematography: Jal Mistry
- Edited by: M. S. Shinde
- Music by: Rahul Dev Burman
- Production company: R.K. Studios
- Distributed by: Bhappi Sonie Productions; Worldwide Entertainment Group
- Release date: 1973
- Country: India
- Language: Hindi

Jheel Ke Us Paar (English: On the other side of the lake) is a 1973 Hindi film produced and directed by Bhappi Sonie. It is based on a novel by Gulshan Nanda, and stars Dharmendra, Mumtaz, Prem Chopra, Pran, Yogeeta Bali, Ranjeet and Shatrughan Sinha. The film's music is by R. D. Burman. Jal Mistry won the Filmfare Best Cinematographer Award.

== Plot ==
Neelu is a blind girl in a village. Sameer Rai, an artist, spots her and wants to restore her eyesight as she lost it in an accident when she was bumped off by his father in her childhood. Sameer's mother wants him to marry Jugnu, but he has fallen in love with the blind girl. Jugnu and Sameer's mother persuades Neelu to play blind even after she regains her eyesight to dissuade Sameer from marrying a downtrodden village girl. They bring along a false husband of Neelu who carries her off into the clutches of Pratap, the illegitimate brother of Sameer. His love interest betrays him, and he is killed. His girlfriend and her dead husband, who is actually alive and playing possum to get insurance money, try to kill Neelu as she has witnessed Pratap's murder. Everything gets resolved in the final climax based on a novel of the same name. The film has many twists and turns.

== Cast ==
- Dharmendra as Sameer Rai
- Mumtaz as Neelu
- Yogeeta Bali as Jugnu
- Shatrughan Sinha as Dr. J. P. Tandon
- Prem Chopra as Pratap
- Ranjeet as Balraj
- Pran as Rasila
- Iftekhar as Diwanji
- Urmila Bhatt as Prabha
- Faryal as Maya
- Anwar Hussain as Hariya
- Mehmood Junior as Chikku

== Soundtrack ==
Lyrics of all the songs were written by lyricist Anand Bakshi.

Song	Singer
"Kya Nazaren, Kya Sitaren"	Kishore Kumar
"Jheel Ke Us Paar"	Lata Mangeshkar
"Keh Rahe Hain Yeh Aansoo"	Lata Mangeshkar
"Babul Tere Bagan Di Main Bulbul"	Lata Mangeshkar
"Do Ghunt Mujhe Bhi Pila De"	Lata Mangeshkar
"Hay, Bichhua Das Gayo Re"	Asha Bhosle
