= Vishwas (film) =

Bollywood drama film

- Poster
- Directed by: Kewal P Kashyap
- Written by: Brij Katyal (dialogues); Gulshan Bawra (lyrics)
- Screenplay by: Brij Katyal
- Story by: David Jeffries
- Produced by: J.N. Khatri
- Starring: Jeetendra; Aparna Sen; Bharat Bhushan; Kamini Kaushal
- Cinematography: Bipin Gajjar
- Edited by: B.S. Glaad
- Music by: Kalyanji Anandji
- Production companies: K.P.K & Vijay Movies
- Release date: 17 October 1969
- Running time: 138 minutes
- Country: India
- Language: Hindi

Vishwas (transl. Trust) is a 1969 Bollywood drama film produced by J. N. Khatri on K.P.K & Vijay Movies banner, directed by Kewal P Kashyap. Starring Jeetendra, Aparna Sen, Bharat Bhushan, Kamini Kaushal in the lead roles and music composed by Kalyanji Anandji.

== Cast ==
- Jeetendra as Ravi
- Aparna Sen as Radha
- Bharat Bhushan as Ramnath 'Ram' Kapoor
- Kamini Kaushal as Neena R. Kapoor
- Mehmood Jr as Munsaf
- Gulshan Bawra as Pyarelal
- Rajendra Nath as Nandlal
- Asit Sen as Sewak Singh
- Manmohan as Mohan
- Raj Mehra as Neena's dad
- Krishan Dhawan as Prem
- Shribhagwan as Dhara Singh
- Dulari as Ramnath's aunt
- Ratnamala as Neena's mom
- Padma Rani as Komal
- Sadhana Patel as Rani

== Soundtrack ==
#	Title	Singer(s)	Raga
1	"Aaj Ki Raat"	Lata Mangeshkar	
2	"Aap Se Humko Bichhade"	Manhar Udhas, Kanchan	
3	"Chandi Ki Deewar"	Mukesh	Darbari Kanada
4	"Dhol Baja"	Mahendra Kapoor, Mukesh, Hemlata, Usha Mangeshkar	
5	"Le Chal Mere Jeevan"	Mukesh, Hemlata	
6	"Muskurake Hum Ko"	Mukesh, Asha Bhosle	
