= Parivar (1967 film) =

Parivaar
- Theatrical release poster
- Directed by: Kewal P Kashyap
- Screenplay by: Brij Katyal
- Story by: Anjana Rawail
- Produced by: Kewal P Kashyap
- Starring: Jeetendra; Nanda
- Cinematography: Bipin Gajjar
- Edited by: B.S. Glaad
- Music by: Kalyanji–Anandji
- Production company: K.P.K. Movies
- Release date: 29 December 1967
- Running time: 146 minutes
- Country: India
- Language: Hindi

Parivar (transl. Family) is a 1967 Indian Hindi-language drama film, produced and directed by Kewal P Kashyap on K.P.K. Movies banner. It stars Jeetendra and Nanda, with music composed by Kalyanji–Anandji.

== Cast ==
- Jeetendra as Gopal
- Nanda as Meena
- Rajendra Nath as Sitaram
- Om Prakash as Karamchand
- Sulochana Chatterjee as Bhagwanti
- Jagdish Raj
- Sumati Gupte as Leela
- Manmohan as Bashir, Bengali Taxi Driver
- Sunder as Doctor
- Gulshan Bawra as Shambhu
- Mehmood Jr. as Young Sitaram
- Krishan Dhawan as Diwanchand Rai
- Jankidas as Paanwala
- Sarita Joshi as Amba (Special Appearance)
- Randhir
- Tun Tun
- Raj Kishore

== Soundtrack ==
The music was composed by Kalyanji–Anandji.

#	Title	Singer(s)
1	"Dekhte Hi Tujhe Mere"	Mahendra Kapoor
2	"Gusse Mein Tumne"	Mahendra Kapoor, Asha Bhosle
3	"Humne Jo Dekhe Sapne"	Mahendra Kapoor, Lata Mangeshkar
4	"London Paris Ghoom Ke Dekhe"	Mukesh, Usha Timothy
5	"Aaj Hai Do October Ka Din"	Lata Mangeshkar
6	"One Two Three"	Anandji Virji Shah, Gulshan Bawra
