= Farida Dadi =

Indian film and television actress (born 1950)

- Born: Farida Dadi; 8 June 1950 (age 76)
- Other name: Baby Farida
- Occupation: Actress
- Years active: 1959–present
- Notable work: Dosti, Ram Aur Shyam, Uttaran, 3 Idiots, Jalebi

Farida Dadi (born 8 June 1950), also known as Baby Farida, is an Indian actress in Hindi-language films and television serials.

== Career ==
She started her career as a child actor in films in the 60s and was the most sought-after child actress. She made her debut as Rama Chaudhary in the movie Sujata (1959), when she was 8 years old. Her most remembered roles as a child artist were in Dosti, Ram Aur Shyam, Brahmachari, Sangam, Kabuliwalah, Jab Jab Phool Khile, Phool Aur Patthar and more with directors like Bimal Roy, Raj Kapoor, K Asif, Mehboob Khan and Guru Dutt.

== Filmography ==
Her films include:

Year	Film	Character/Role
1959	Sujata	Young Sujata
1960	Dili Ni Katha	
1960	Usne Kaha Tha	Young Farida
1960	Patang	
1960	Kalpana	Munni
1961	Aas Ka Panchhi (as Baby Fareeda)	
1961	Kabuliwala	Amina A. Khan
1961	Chhaya	Young Sarita
1961	Batwara	Munni
1962	Hariyali Aur Rasta	Young Shobhna
1962	Man-Mauji	Advocate's Daughter
1962	Gyara Hazar Ladkian (as Baby Farida)	
1963	Yeh Rastey Hain Pyar Ke	Rita A. Sahni
1964	Sangam	Young Radha
1964	Dosti	Manjula 'Manju'
1964	Beti Bete	Young Lakshmi
1965	Janwar	
1965	Jab Jab Phool Khile	Munni
1966	Phool Aur Patthar	Jumni
1966	Dil Diya Dard Liya	
1966	Devar	Munni M. Singh (as Baby Farida)
1966	Aasra	Somlata (Sona)
1967	Nasihat	Kamla
1967	Ram Aur Shyam	Kuku
1967	Raat Aur Din	Young Varuna
1968	Brahmachari	Chandni (Child Artist)
1968	Teen Bahuraniyan	Parvati's Daughter (as Farida)
1968	Payal Ki Jhankar	Pammi's Sister
1969	Badi Didi	Shobha
1984	Sohni Mahiwal (as Farida)	
1989	Prem Pratigyaa (as Farida)	
2006	Jai Santoshi Maa	
2006	Ab To Banja Sajanwa Hamaar	Surajmukhi - Chandu's wife
2007	Dhol	Mrs. Elizabeth Tripathi
2007	My Love	Khalajaan
2007	Bhool Bhulaiyaa	Avni's Grandmother
2008	Pehli Nazar Ka Pyaar	Malati / Anju's mother
2009	Vaada Raha	Pooja's mom
2009	3 Idiots	Mrs. Qureshi
2010	Ashok Chakra: Tribute to Real Heroes	Mrs. Aatule
2010	Toofan	Saavi
2012	Luv U Soniyo	Mark's Granny
2013	Gippi	Sister Maria
2015	Rahasya	Mrs. Noorani
2015	Madmast Barkhaa	
2016	Loveshhuda	Pooja's Grandmom
2017	Dil Jo Na Keh Saka	
2018	Jalebi	Elderly passenger on train
2018	Satti Par Satto (Gujarati)	Baa (दादी)
2022	Brahmāstra: Part One – Shiva	Aunty

=== Television ===
Year	Show	Role
2003	Saara Akaash	General Durani's Mother
2003	Miss India	Suhani's Mother
2004	Hey... Yehii to Haii Woh!	Noorie
2006	Ghar Ki Lakshmi Betiyann	Radhaji
2007	Dill Mill Gayye	Armaan's Bi
2008	Balika Vadhu	Tai Doctor
2008–2014	Uttaran	Anjum Nani
2013	Best of Luck Nikki	Bua maa
2012	Savdhaan India	RajLaxmi, Mother-in-Law (Episode 1181/ Ratna Rastogi (Episode 2251)
2013	Jodha Akbar	Apoorva devi, Bharmal's mother; Jodha's grandmother
2016	Khorshid	
2016	Ichhapyaari Naagin	Kaushalya Pratap
2017	Chupke Chupke	Dadiya
2018	Namune	Kaushalya Agnihotri
2018–2019	Tantra	Mrs. Khanna (Dadi)
2019	Jijaji Chhat Per Hain	Amma
2020–2021; 2023	Kumkum Bhagya	Baljeet Dadi
2021–2022	Thapki Pyaar Ki 2	Jayanti Singhania
2022	Appnapan – Badalte Rishton Ka Bandhan	Mrs. Jaisingh
2022	Ali Baba: Dastaan-E-Kabul	Mariam's caretaker
2023	Yeh Rishta Kya Kehlata Hai	Nilamma "Amma"
2023–2024	Saubhagyavati Bhava: * Niyam Aur Shartein Laagu	Neela Sharma
2024	Krishna Mohini	Dayawanti Thakkar
2025	Doree 2	Dadi
2026	Noyontara	Mrs. Basu
2026–present	Yeh Fitoor Tera	Mrs. Saxena

=== Web series ===
Year	Title	Role	Platform	Notes
2018	Haq Se	Shagufta	ALT Balaji	
2024	Dil Dosti Dilemma	Ghazala Aapa	Amazon Prime Video	
