= Dhumal (actor) =

Indian actor (1914–1987)

Anant Balwant Dhumal
- Born: 29 March 1914
- Died: 13 February 1987 (aged 72); Mumbai
- Occupation: Actor
- Years active: 1940s–1980s

Anant Balwant Dhumal (29 March 1914 – 13 February 1987), popularly known as Dhumal, was an actor in Bollywood films known for playing character roles. He acted in many movies and was active from the mid 1940s till the late 1980s. He started his acting career from Marathi theatre, which paved way for Marathi cinema and later he moved to Hindi cinema, where he mostly played comedy roles and later in his career, character roles. He worked in notable films such as Howrah Bridge (1958), Bombai Ka Babu (1960), Kashmir Ki Kali (1964), Gumnaam (1965), Do Badan (1966), Love in Tokyo (1966) and Benaam (1974).

== Career ==
His career in acting began when he joined a drama company, where he served drinks and washed utensils. There would be occasions when artistes playing minor roles failed to turn up; this would give the spot boys an opportunity to fill in for them. This was how Dhumal landed up with bit roles in plays.

During this period, he met P. K. Atre and Nanasaheb Phatak, both big names in the drama world. Soon, he started getting recognised and bigger roles came his way. Although he eventually became famous as a comedian in films, he was more well known as a villain. He played major roles in famous plays such as Lagna Chi Bedi and Ghara Baher.

From the stage, he shifted his focus to the silver screen. He worked in big movies such as Woh Kaun Thi, Ankhen, Gumnaam, Arzoo and Sasural. His first movie was a Marathi film called Pedgaonche Shahane (1952) in which he played the role of a South Indian.

He paired with fellow comedians Mehmood and Shobha Khote in numerous Hindi films, such as Sasural (1961).

== Selected filmography ==
Year	Title	Role
1948	Jeevacha Sakha	Peera Dhaigude
1953	Chacha Chowdhury	Chachaji
1954	Jagriti	Man in audience
1956	Parivar	Dhoomal
1956	New Delhi	Kumar Swami
1956	Ek Shola	Pedro
1956	Suvarna Sundari	Babu
1956	Pasant Aahe Mulgi	Vasu
1957	Ek Gaon Ki Kahani	Bansi
1957	Apradhi Kaun?	Deaf & Dumb servant
1957	Night Club	Dhoomal
1958	Sone Ki Chidiya	Film Producer
1958	Police	Kela Master
1958	Phagun	Mattu
1958	Khota Paisa	Munim Satyanarayan
1958	Howrah Bridge	Uncle Joe
1958	Detective	Chaudhary
1958	Ujala	Bholu
1959	Main Nashe Men Hoon	Munshi Totaram (as Dhoomal)
1959	Chhoti Bahen	Sukhiya
1960	Jagachya Pathivar	Vasu
1960	Girl Friend	
1960	Ek Phool Char Kaante	Uncle – Religious
1960	Bombai Ka Babu	Mamu
1960	Shola Aur Shabnam	Munshiji
1961	Sasural	Dharamdas
1961	Mem-Didi	Sethji
1961	Boy Friend	Sampat
1962	Sahib Bibi Aur Ghulam	Bansi
1962	Rungoli	Balabadradas
1962	Ek Musafir Ek Hasina	Ultaram
1962	Bijli Chamke Jamna Paar	
1962	Anpadh	Kalu
1962	Aaj Aur Kal	Dhanaksingh's Secretary
1963	Pyar Ka Bandhan	Lala
1963	Holiday in Bombay	Hanuman Prasad
1963	Hamrahi	Hukumchand
1963	Akela	
1963	Zindagi	Chameli's dad
1964	Ziddi	Ramdas
1964	Woh Kaun Thi?	Madhav
1964	Kashmir Ki Kali	Bholaram
1964	Awara Badal	Babloo
1964	Gumnaam	Mister Dharamdas
1965	Rishte Naate	Diwanji
1965	Mere Sanam	Bankhe
1965	Chand Aur Suraj	Nand Gopal
1965	Bahu Beti	Nemak Das
1965	Arzoo	Munshi Ashadaulal (as Dhoomal)
1965	Love in Tokyo	Sheela's dad
1966	Preet Na Jane Reet	Rosie's father
1966	Mera Saaya	Bankeji
1966	Do Badan	Mohan's dad
1966	Devar	Ram Bharose / R.B. Bosay
1966	Woh Koi Aur Hoga	Pran Nath
1967	Chandan Ka Palna	Gopi
1967	Anita	Roshandhan
1967	Teen Bahuraniyan	Hariprasad – Radha's Father
1968	Suhaag Raat	Parwana
1968	Saraswatichandra	Passenger in bull cart (Savior)
1968	Payal Ki Jhankar	Vaidraj
1968	Mera Naam Johar	007 / Charan Das
1968	Brahmachari	Kirtandas (Taxi Driver)
1968	Ankhen	Studio Owner
1968	Ek Shriman Ek Shrimati	Maharaj (Jungle King)
1969	Tumse Achha Kaun Hai	Sheila's Father
1969	Sachaai	Hostel Warden
1969	Pyasi Sham	D'Souza
1969	Pyar Hi Pyar	Jattadhari
1969	Prarthana	
1969	Balak	Dharamraj
1969	Kab? Kyoon? Aur Kahan?	Stewart
1970	Tum Haseen Main Jawan	Seth Ganpat Rao
1970	Samaj Ko Badal Dalo	
1970	Albela	
1971	Jaane-Anjaane	Dhondu
1971	Preetam	Gauri's Father
1971	Hungama	Banaspati Prasad
1971	Woh Din Yaad Karo	
1971	Naya Zamana	Dharamdas, the landlord
1971	Jawan Mohabbat	Chhote Lal
1971	Haar Jeet	
1972	Do Gaz Zameen Ke Neeche	
1972	Do Chor	Tikamdas
1972	Baazigar	
1972	Jugnu	Sheela's Father
1973	Benaam	Police Constable Havaldar
1974	Sanyasi	Dinu – House Servant
1975	Aaram Haram Aahe	Jagge
1976	Bhanwar	Chaudhary Phuliaram
1976	Udhar Ka Sindur	Sunderprasad's dad
1976	Kabeela	Lalaji
1976	Ha Khel Sawalyancha	Diwanji
1976	Palkon Ki Chhaon Mein	
1977	Saheb Bahadur	Charandas
1977	Naav Motha Lakshan Khota	
1977	Dream Girl	Manager of the shop
1977	Chalta Purza	Constable Balchander
1978	Devata	
1978	Karmayogi	Kakaram
1978	Besharam	Mukhiya
1978	Anjaam	Totaram
1978	Maan Apmaan	Makhan's maternal uncle
1979	Khandaan	To-be groom's uncle
1979	Janta Hawaldar	
1979	Aaitya Bilavar Nagoba	Sindhu Madhav Shastri
1979	Geet Gaata Chal	
1980	Sheetla Mata	Munim Ram Bharose
1981	Daasi	Mangala's maternal aunt
1981	Sannata	Shankar Kaka
1981	Jail Yatra	Constable at the beach
1981	Dil Hi Dil Mein	Ramdhan (Mr. Verma's servant)
1982	Bade Dil Wala	Banwarilal
1983	Bindiya Chamkegi	Daulatram
1984	Maati Maangey Khoon	Sharda's dad
1984	Duniya	Pascal
1984	Bijli	Sethu – Parvati's brother
1986	Pyar Ka Mandir	Patient

== Death ==
Dhumal died on 13 February 1987 due to a massive heart attack.
