= Chowki No.11 =

1978 film

- Theatrical release poster
- Directed by: V.K.Sobti
- Written by: V.K.Sobti
- Produced by: Kuki; Siddharthas (presents)
- Starring: Vinod Mehra; Amjad Khan; Zarina Wahab; Aruna Irani; Jeetendra (Guest)
- Cinematography: S.N.Dubey
- Edited by: Rajoo
- Music by: Sonik Omi
- Production company: Reaching New Heights
- Release date: 6 December 1978
- Running time: 133 mins
- Country: India
- Language: Hindi

Chowki No.11 (transl. Checkpost No: 11) is a 1978 Hindi-language action film, produced by Kuki on Reaching New Heights banner and directed by V.K.Sobti. Starring Vinod Mehra, Amjad Khan, Zarina Wahab while Jeetendra has given special appearance and music composed by Sonik Omi.

== Cast ==
- Vinod Mehra as Vijay
- Zarina Wahab as Rajni
- Aruna Irani as Shanno
- Kader Khan as Krishna / K. K.
- Amjad Khan as Shankar
- Jeetendra as Jeeten (Guest Appearance)
- Manmohan as Seth Chetan Das
- Jagdeep as Bobby
- Yunus Parvez as Police Officer
- Krishan Dhawan as Shanno's Father

== Soundtrack ==
Song	Singer
"Kaise Rishte, Kaise Naate"	Mohammed Rafi, Manna Dey
"Kahin Ho Na Muhalle Mein Halla"	Shobha Gurtu
"Mummy O Mummy"	Vijayeta Pandit
