= Umar Qaid =

- Theatrical release poster
- Directed by: Sikandar Khanna
- Written by: Kader Khan; Bhushan Banmali (dialogues); Gulshan Bawra (lyrics)
- Screenplay by: Ram Kelkar; K.K. Shukla
- Story by: K.K. Shukla
- Produced by: C.K.Sobti
- Starring: Sunil Dutt; Jeetendra; Vinod Mehra; Moushumi Chatterjee; Reena Roy
- Cinematography: Sudershan Nag
- Edited by: B.S. Glaad
- Music by: Sonik-Omi
- Production company: Gautam Pictures
- Release date: 13 June 1975
- Running time: 127 minutes
- Country: India
- Language: Hindi

Umar Qaid (transl. Life Sentence) is a 1975 Hindi-language action film, starring Sunil Dutt. The film is about a prison break. Produced by V. K. Sobti under the Gautam Pictures banner and directed by Sikandar Khanna, it also stars Jeetendra, Vinod Mehra, Moushumi Chatterjee, and Reena Roy. Music for the film, including the song "Aag Me Jale Jawani", was composed by Sonik-Omi.

== Cast ==
- Sunil Dutt as Raja
- Jeetendra as Akbar
- Vinod Mehra as Vinod
- Moushumi Chatterjee as Dr. Bharati
- Reena Roy as Reena
- Anju Mahendru as Anju
- Sanjana as Laxmi
- Asrani
- Om Shivpuri
- Sulochana as Vinod's mother
- Dev Kumar
- Krishan Dhawan
- Manmohan
- Ram Mohan
- Dinesh Hingoo
- Raja Duggal
- Master Satyajeet as Chintu

== Soundtrack ==
#	Song	Singer	Raga
1	"Yaad Rahega Pyar Ka"	Lata Mangeshkar, Mukesh	Kalyan
2	"Kya Lekar Aaya Hai"	Mahendra Kapoor, Manna Dey, Sonik, Narendra Chanchal	
3	"Phinjauda Bahek Gayi"	Mohammed Rafi, Asha Bhosle, Minoo Purushottam	
4	"Aag Mein Jale Jawani"	Asha Bhosle	
5	"Yun Na Dekh Mujhe"	Asha Bhosle	
