= Bazooband =

- Directed by: Ramanand Sagar
- Written by: Ramanand Sagar
- Screenplay by: Ramanand Sagar
- Story by: Ramanand Sagar
- Produced by: Asha Biswas
- Starring: Balraj Sahni; Sulochana Chatterjee; Om Prakash; Anwar Hussain
- Cinematography: M. W. Mukadam
- Edited by: R. S. Junnarkar
- Music by: Mohammed Shafi
- Production company: Variety Productions
- Distributed by: Variety Productions
- Release date: 1954
- Country: India
- Language: Hindi

Bazooband is a 1954 Bollywood film, directed by Ramanand Sagar.

== Story ==
"The elderly Saanware Seth who has spent all his money at the kotha serves as a factotum and occasional entertainer there, and it is suggested that he was once the nayika's lover."

== Cast ==
- Balraj Sahni
- Sulochana Chatterjee
- Om Prakash
- Anwar Hussain
- Roopmala
- Ramesh Kapoor
- Baby Saroj

== Songs ==
Lyrics written by Prem Dhawan.

1. "Man Me Laagi Aag, O Maalik Kya Tu Bhi Soya" - Lata Mangeshkar
2. "Bazooband Khul Khul Jaye" - Lata Mangeshkar
3. "Dil Ki Mehfil Me Aake Chale Ho Kaha" - Lata Mangeshkar
4. "Aarzoo Ye Hai Ke Nikle Dam Tumhare Samne" - Lata Mangeshkar
5. "Bina Dosh Sita Mata Ko Diya Ram Ne GharSe Nikal" - Asha Bhosle
6. "Diya Bujhaao Jhatpat Jhatpat" - G. M. Durrani
7. "Meri Wohi Tamanna Tere Wohi Bahane" - Lata Mangeshkar
