= Sulochana Chatterjee =

Indian actress

- Born: 1928; Chandannagar, British India
- Died: 30 April 1999 (aged 70–71); Calcutta, West Bengal, India
- Occupation: Actress
- Years active: 1942–1988

Sulochana Chatterjee (1928 - 30 April 1999) was a former Indian film actress, who worked as a character actor in Hindi and Bengali cinema, appearing in 93 films, most notably Aaja Sanam (1968), Jahan Sati Wahan Bhagwan (1965) and Veer Ghatotkach (1970).

== Early life ==
Born in Chandranagar, Sulochana is the daughter of a military man and the family, five girls, including the late Kamla Chatterjee, and one boy.

== Career ==
Sulochana Chatterjee started her career in Hindi films in the early 1940s with films like Shobha (1942), Paigham (1943), Vishwas (1943), Aina (1944) etc. She was mostly seen in supporting roles, but also played the leading part in few films including Veena (1948).

== Filmography ==
Year	Show	Character/Role
1979	Shabhash Daddy	
1977	Baba Taraknath	
1976	Jeevan Jyoti	Pratima
1976	Naag Champa	
1976	Bhanwar	Sister Teressa
1975	Ponga Pandit	Rukmini Neelkanth Pandey
1975	Sunehra Sansar	Savita's aunt
1974	Ang Se Ang Lagaley	Ashadevi (Rajesh's Mother)
1974	International Crook	Lajwanti (as Sulochana Chatterji)
1973	Jwar Bhata	Gayatri's step-mom
1972	Mahashivratri	
1972	Mere Bhaiya	Saraswati's Mother
1972	Sanjog	
1972	Piya Ka Ghar	Mrs. Girdharilal Sharma
1972	Baankelal	
1972	Shiv Bhakat Baba Balak Nath	
1971	Duniya Kya Jane	
1971	Hum Tum Aur Woh	Mrs. Shyam Lal
1971	Lakhon Me Ek	Sumitra Chatterjee
1971	Nadaan	Mrs. Sarla Jain
1971	Janani	
1971	Brahma Vishnu Mahesh	
1971	Veer Chhatrasal	
1970	Bachpan	Nekiram's sister
1970	Ehsan	Laxmi V. Prasad
1970	Ghar Ghar Ki Kahani	Suresh's mom (as Sulochana Chatterji)
1970	Pardesi	
1970	Priya	
1970	Veer Ghatotkach	Subhadra - Kanhaiya's sister
1970	My Love	Sangeeta's Mother
1970	Holi Ayee Re	Durga Verma
1969	Doli	Mrs. Ramprasad
1969	Pyar Hi Pyar	Laxmi
1969	Ek Masoom	Malti (Mrs. Gangadhar)
1968	Aulad	Mamta (Dinu's Wife) (as Sulochana Chatterji)
1968	Balram Shri Krishna	
1968	Payal Ki Jhankar	Sita - Shyam's Mom (as Sulochna Chatterji)
1968	Saraswatichandra	Pramad's mother (as Sulochana Chatterji)
1968	Aaja Sanam	Kamini's mummy
1967	Parivar	Bhagwanti
1967	Chhoti Si Mulaqat	
1967	Gunehgar	Deepak's Mother
1967	Raat Aur Din	Jamuna (as Sulochana Chaterjee)
1966	Chhota Bhai	Parvati
1966	Laadla (1966 film)	Rama's Mother
1965	Faisla	Tara
1965	Jahan Sati Wahan Bhagwan	Maharani (as Sulochna Chatterji)
1965	Khandan	Parvati Shankar Lal
1965	Saheli	Reshma's Mother (as Sulochana Chatterji)
1964	Ek Din Ka Badshah	
1964	Pooja Ke Phool	Mrs. Laxmi Hukumat Rai (as Sulochana Chatterji)
1964	Daal Mein Kala	Manager - Girl's Hostel
1963	Bidesiya	
1963	Deepak	
1963	Ek Dil Sao Afsane	Neelu's Mother (as Sulochna Chatterji)
1963	Gul-e-Bakavali	Beghum-Queen
1963	Holiday in Bombay	Jumna Kaki (Neighbour)
1963	Bharosa	Mrs. Laxmi Lal
1963	Bandini	Devendra's mother
1962	Man-Mauji	Bhola Ram's wife (as Sulochana Chetterji)
1962	Reporter Raju	Nurse Kanta (as Sulchana Chatterji)
1961	Amrit Manthan	
1961	Mera Suhaag	
1961	Reshmi Rumal	Achala (uncredited)
1960	Jis Desh Men Ganga Behti Hai	Police Superintendent's wife (as Salochana Chatterjee)
1960	Mehlon Ke Khwab	Chander's Mother
1959	Samarat Prithviraj Chauvan	Gauri - Kavi Chand's Wife
1958	Balyogi Upmanyu	
1958	Detective	Mrs. Kamla Lal (as Sulochana Chattarjee)
1958	Maya Bazaar	Subhadra
1956	Jagte Raho	Meenu (as Sulochana Chaterjee)
1955	Jagadguru Shankaracharya	
1955	Patit Pawan	
1954	Bazooband	Radha
1954	Munna	
1951	Badi Bahu	
1951	Ghayal	
1950	Apni Chhaya	
1950	Bahurani	
1950	Kisi Ki Yaad	
1950	Sati Narmada	
1949	Paras	Champa
1949	Aiye	
1949	Jeevan Saathi	
1949	Maa Ka Pyaar	
1948	Grihasthi	
1948	Veena	
1947	Doli	
1947	Mera Suhaag	
1946	Shahjehan	Jafiza (as Sulochana Chatterji)
1945	Prabhu Ka Ghar	Nanda
1944	Aaina	
