= Bade Dil Wala =

Bade Dilwala
- Directed by: Bhappi Sonie
- Written by: Gulshan Nanda (story), C.J. Pavri (screenplay), Dr. Rahi Masoom Reza (dialogue)
- Produced by: Bhappi Sonie
- Starring: Rishi Kapoor; Tina Munim; Pran; Aruna Irani; Madan Puri; Amjad Khan
- Cinematography: N V Srinivas
- Edited by: M. S. Shinde
- Music by: R. D. Burman
- Release date: 24 September 1983
- Country: India
- Language: Hindi

Bade Dilwala (English translation - Big Hearted) is a 1983 Hindi-language action crime film directed by Bhappi Sonie and starring Rishi Kapoor, Tina Munim, Pran, Aruna Irani, Madan Puri, Amjad Khan, Jagdeep and Sarika. The movie was a remake of Kati Patang with a gender change.

== Plot ==
Widower businessman Mr. Sinha lives a very wealthy lifestyle along with two daughters, Juhi and Rashmi. Both are of marriageable age and he wants them to marry within equally wealthy families. Juhi ends up falling in love with a middle-classed young man named Vijay Kumar Gupta much to the chagrin of Sinha, who refuses to bless the couple, compelling them to elope. Years later Vijay and Juhi become parents to a young boy, Munna, Sinha forgives them and asks them to return home. The train they were traveling in meets with an accident and amongst the survivors are Vijay and his son. A grieving Sinha welcomes Munna and Vijay, treats Vijay as his son, lets him run the business as well as decides to make him the heir to his wealth and estate. When Reshmi returns home, she is apprehensive of Vijay, at first, then falls in love with him. A man named Dr. Joshi brings an amnesiac Juhi home. He knows a dark secret about Vijay, that he is an ex-convict, jailed for Theft, and is now on the run from the Police for murder.

== Cast ==
- Rishi Kapoor ... Amrit Kumar Saxena / Vijay Kumar Gupta
- Tina Munim ... Rashmi Sinha
- Pran ... Mr. Sinha
- Aruna Irani ... Shabnam
- Madan Puri ... Makhanlal
- Amjad Khan ... Bhagwat Singh / Dr. Joshi
- Jagdeep ... Jagannath Prasad Shrivastav "Jaggu"
- Dhumal ... Banwarilal
- Bharat Bhushan ... Doctor
- Vijay Arora ... Vijay Kumar Gupta
- Sarika ... Juhi Sinha
- Roopesh Kumar ... Prem
- Bhushan Tiwari ... Shambhu
- Shivraj ... Vasil-Ul-Hassan Khan
- Kalpana Iyer ... Luska/Kaajal
- Jyoti Bakshi ... Tara J. Shrivastava
- Jankidas ... Dr. Jamunadas
- Madhu Malhotra ... Ms. Malhotra
- Praveen Paul ... Kamla Shrivastava
- Habib ... Gypsy dance show arranger
- Raj Rani ... Mrs.Khan
- Babloo ... Munna, Vijay & Juhi's son
- Dilip Dhawan ... Dr.Ali Khan

== Soundtrack ==
The songs were written by Majrooh Sultanpuri and the track "Kahin Na Jaa Aaj Kahin Mat Jaa" is inspired by the 1945 song La Vie en rose.

| Song | Singer |
|---|---|
| "Tujh Mein Kya Hai Deewane" | Kishore Kumar, Lata Mangeshkar |
| "Kahi Na Jaa, Aaj Kahi Mat Jaa" | Kishore Kumar, Lata Mangeshkar |
| "Kaho Kaise Rasta Bhool Pade" | Kishore Kumar, Lata Mangeshkar |
| "Aaya Sanam Aaya Deewane Tera" | Kishore Kumar |
| "Jeevan Ke Din Chhote Sahi" - 1 | Kishore Kumar |
| "Jeevan Ke Din Chhote Sahi" - 2 | Lata Mangeshkar, Udit Narayan |
| "Jeevan Ke Din Chhote Sahi" - 3 | Udit Narayan, Baby Preeti |

== Trivia ==
Pran's character is shown owning a beverage manufacturing plant 'Dipy's' which was a famous brand in 80's selling orange and lime juice, jams etc.
