= Jail Yatra (1981 film) =

- Poster
- Directed by: Bhappi Sonie
- Screenplay by: Sachin Bhowmick
- Produced by: Pravin Bali; Vijay Maria
- Starring: Ashok Kumar; Vinod Khanna; Reena Roy
- Cinematography: Jal Mistry
- Edited by: M.S. Shinde
- Music by: Rahul Dev Burman
- Release date: 7 September 1981
- Country: India
- Language: Hindi

Jail Yatra is a 1981 Indian Bollywood action drama film directed by Bhappi Sonie. It stars Ashok Kumar, Vinod Khanna and Reena Roy in pivotal roles.

== Cast ==
- Ashok Kumar as Ramnath Verma
- Vinod Khanna as Raju Verma
- Reena Roy as Shanu
- Nirupa Roy as Radha Verma
- Amjad Khan as Kuldeep
- Jagdeep as Garage Owner
- Anwar Hussain as Police Inspector
- Katy Mirza as Jagdeep Wife
- Heena Kausar as Roopa
- Dhumal as Constable at the beach
- Birbal
- MB Shetty as goon

== Soundtrack ==
Lyrics: Majrooh Sultanpuri

Song	Singer
"Bachna Raja Ji"	Kishore Kumar
"Yeh Jo Nazar Hamari Tumhari Ladi Hain"	Kishore Kumar, Lata Mangeshkar
"Nahin Lagta Hay Dil"	Lata Mangeshkar
"Kya Takalluf Hai Wallah, Lijiye Dil Bismillah"	Asha Bhosle, Mohammed Rafi, Bhupinder Singh
"Paake Akeli Mohe"	Lata Mangeshkar, Asha Bhosle
