= Haar Jeet (1972 film) =

- Directed by: C.P. Dixit
- Written by: K. Balachander
- Produced by: N.N. Sippy
- Starring: Rehana Sultan; Anil Dhawan
- Cinematography: Jal Mistry
- Edited by: Waman B. Bhosle; Gurudutt Shirali
- Music by: Laxmikant–Pyarelal
- Release date: 14 April 1972
- Country: India
- Language: Hindi

Haar Jeet (transl. Losing, Winning) is a 1972 Hindi-language drama film directed by C.P. Dixit. The film stars Rehana Sultan and Anil Dhawan. The film was a remake of Tamil film Thamarai Nenjam.

== Cast ==
- Rehana Sultan ... Kamal
- Radha Saluja ... Radha
- Anil Dhawan ... Ashok Gupta
- Mehmood ... Narayan
- Madan Puri ... Madhusudan Gupta (Ashok's Elder Brother)
- Dhumal ... Radha's Father
- Sarika
- Master Chintu
- Bhola
- Jal Khatau
- Narendra Kumar
- Kamini Kaushal

== Soundtrack ==
Song	Singer
"Itne Din Tum"	Kishore Kumar, Asha Bhosle
"Yeh Sach Hai"	Lata Mangeshkar
"Dosh Badon Ka"	Lata Mangeshkar, Manna Dey
"Tu Badi Kismatwali Hain"	Lata Mangeshkar, Asha Bhosle
