= Bombai Ka Babu =

1960 film

Bombai Ka Baboo
- Directed by: Raj Khosla
- Written by: Rajinder Singh Bedi
- Produced by: Raj Khosla; Jal Mistry
- Starring: Dev Anand; Suchitra Sen; Jeevan; Achala Sachdev; Jagdish Raj
- Cinematography: Jal Mistry
- Music by: Sachin Dev Burman; Majrooh Sultanpuri (Lyrics)
- Release date: 1960
- Running time: 154 minutes
- Country: India
- Language: Hindi

Bombai Ka Babu (transl. Gentleman from Bombay) is a 1960 Hindi film directed by Raj Khosla and written by Rajinder Singh Bedi. The film stars Dev Anand and Suchitra Sen in a rare appearance in Hindi cinema.

Except for the "brother-sister" angle, the plot of Bombai Ka Babu is inspired by O. Henry's short story, "A Double-Dyed Deceiver". The 1974 movie Zameer starring Amitabh Bachchan and Saira Banu was also based on the same story.

With classic songs such as "Chal Ri Sajni, Ab Kya Soche", by Mukesh, and "Deewana Mastana Hua Dil" by Mohd. Rafi and Asha Bhosle, the film was a musical masterpiece, with music by S. D. Burman and lyrics by Majrooh Sultanpuri. Raj Khosla was also the director of Dev Anand's suspense thrillers like C.I.D. (1956) and Kala Pani (1958).

Initially, Madhubala was the choice for playing the female lead, but she had to withdraw owing to her poor heart condition.

== Plot ==
Babu and Malik are two inseparable friends who live in a small town in India. One day, they decide to play a prank and steal something, but get caught. While Malik's dad came to bail out and stand as surety for him, Babu has no one to do so and ends up in the juvenile centre. When the two grow up, Malik becomes a police inspector, while Babu takes to crime and ends up in jail. When he is released from the jail, he goes to meet his partner-in-crime, Bali, and together they start planning the next heist. Malik meets Babu and tells him to straighten his ways. But Babu had already tried that and ended up being falsely accused of stealing a necklace belonging to his employer's wife. Nevertheless, Babu does inform Bali that he will not be taking part in any crime. Thereafter, Bali and his men are arrested and they blame Babu for ratting on them. Bali is released on bail. When Babu meets him, an argument ensues leading to a fight and Bali is killed. A fearful Babu flees Bombay and lands up in Jogendra Nagar in Northern India, where he meets a man named Bhagat who asks him to masquerade as Kundan, the sole heir of a wealthy man named Shahji. When Babu refuses, Bhagat threatens to notify the police. Babu becomes Kundan and makes his way into the hearts of Shahji, his wife Rukmani and daughter Maya. Babu gets enough cash to pay off Bhagat in small instalments, but Bhagat becomes greedy and wants Babu to steal all the cash and jewellery and abscond. Babu is reluctant to steal from the kind people. To make matters worse, he has fallen in love with Maya - apparently his "sister". Caught between a rock and a hard place - no matter what move Babu makes - he will surely end up trapping himself - not only with Bhagat, but with his newfound family as well as the police - who are now hot on his trail.

== Cast ==
- Dev Anand as Babu / Kundan (Fake)
- Suchitra Sen as Maya
- Nazir Hussain as Shahji
- Dhumal as Munim
- Manohar Deepak as Shame
- Achala Sachdev as Rukmani
- Rashid Khan as Bhagat
- Jagdish Raj as Bali / Kundan (Real)
- Tun Tun as guest appearance in song Tak Dhoom Baje
- Bela Bose as Maya's Friend

== Songs ==
Music: S. D. Burman; Lyrics: Majrooh Sultanpuri.

Song	Singer	Raga
"Sathi Na Koi Manzil"	Mohammed Rafi	
"Deewana Mastana Hua Dil, Jaan-E-Jahan"	Mohammed Rafi, Asha Bhosle	
"Pawan Chale To Uthe Man Mein Lehar Si"	Mohammed Rafi, Asha Bhosle	
"Dekhne Mein Bhola Hai"	Asha Bhosle	
"Aise Mein Kachhu Kaha"	Asha Bhosle	
"Chal Ri Sajni Ab Kya Soche"	Mukesh	Kalavati
"Takdam Takdam Baje"	Manna Dey	

== Trivia ==
In the opening sequences, one can hear the classical songs 'Dil se milake dil pyar kijiye' from the movie Taxi Driver and ' O dilwale' playing in the background.
