= Krishan Dhawan =

Indian actor (1926–1994)

- Born: Krishan Dhawan; 1926
- Died: May 20, 1994 (aged 67–68)
- Occupation: Actor
- Children: Dilip Dhawan

Krishan Dhawan (1926 – 20 May 1994) was an Indian character actor in Hindi language films whose career spanned four decades from 1950 to 1993.

== Career ==
Krishan Dhawan was an actor, known for Vidhaata (1982), Mujhe Jeene Do (1963) and Roti Kapada Aur Makaan (1974).

== Personal life ==
He was born in Mumbai in a Punjabi Hindu family. He is the father of actor Dilip Dhawan who acted in the iconic television serial "Nukkad" portraying the role of the mechanic "Guru".

== Filmography ==
Year	Film	Character/Role
1950	Afsar	
1951	Baazi	Ramesh
1954	Taxi Driver	Crooked gambler
1955	Milap	Mohan Dayal (as Krishin Dhawan)
1955	Dev Anand in Goa (Alias Farar)	Police Inspector – Goa
1956	Jagte Raho	Chinnu
1956	Funtoosh	
1957	Nau Do Gyarah	Kuldeep
1957	Arpan	(as Krishan Dhawan)
1957	Anjali	
1958	Kala Pani	Jumman
1960	Manzil	Captain Prem Nath
1960	Kala Bazar	Sapna's Boyfriend (as Krishna Dhawan)
1960	Ek Phool Char Kaante	Shyam Dhawan
1961	Maya	Deepak (as Krishen Dhawan)
1961	Kanch Ki Gudiya	Amar
1961	Chhaya	Shyam Lal
1962	Sahib Bibi Aur Ghulam	Master Babu (as Kishen Dhawan)
1963	Phir Wohi Dil Laya Hoon	Mr. Kapoor
1963	Mujhe Jeene Do	School-teacher
1965	Shaheed	Sardar Ajit Singh
1965	Janwar	Mr. Srivastava (as Krishna Dhawan)
1965	Guide	Inspector Girdhari
1965	Chhoti Chhoti Baatein	Advocate Girish Lal
1966	Teesri Kasam	Lalmohar
1967	Upkar	Ramu
1967	Parivar	Diwanchand Rai
1968/I	Brahmachari	Sheetal's Uncle (Mamaji)
1968	Jhuk Gaya Aasman	Ramdas
1968	Parivar	Diwanchand
1969	Vishwas	Prem
1969	Pyar Hi Pyar	Kewal Mehra
1970	Sawan Bhadon	Darbarilal
1970	Tum Haseen Main Jawan	Barrister Avinash
1970	Purab Aur Pachhim	Om – Bharat's dad
1970	Jeevan Mrityu	Ramakant
1971	Sansar	Dayal
1971	Jawan Muhabat	Constable
1971	Ek Nari Ek Brahmachari	(as Kishen Dhawan)
1972	Aankhon Aankhon Mein	Mamaji (Uncle)
1972	Jangal Mein Mangal	Officer Ratanlal (as Krishna Dhawan)
1972	Yaar Mera	Police Inspector
1972	Wafaa	Shanti's Father
1972	Shor	Shanker's father
1973	Zanjeer	Smuggler – Teja's man (as Dhawan)
1973	Nafrat	
1973	Jalte Badan	(as Kishan Dhavan)
1974	Call Girl	
1974	Roti Kapada Aur Makaan	Bharat's Father
1974	Woh Main Nahin	Shaikh Mansoor
1974	Vada Tera Vada	Preeti's father
1974	Insaaniyat	Ramu
1975	Andhera	Jugal
1975	Dharmatma	Kishanlal – Anu's dad
1975	Umar Qaid	
1976	Kalicharan	Avtaar Seth
1976	Maha Chor	Diwanji
1977	Shirdi Ke Sai Baba	Chaand
1977	Amaanat	Mohan's Father
1977	Zamaanat	John uncle
1977	Tinku	Adhikari
1977	Chor Sipahee	Priya's dad
1977	Agar... If	Ashok Saxena / Bhandar
1978	Darwaza	Rachna's Father
1978	Bhookh	Beena's dad
1978	Chowki No.11	
1978	Aahuti	
1979	Shikshaa	Kundan
1979	Gautam Govinda	Lala
1979	Suhaag	
1980	Zakhmon Ke Nishan	
1981	Bulundi	Bhanu Khatri
1981	Krodhi	Jagannath
1981	Sannata	Public Prosecutor
1981	Dard (Conflict of Emotions)	
1981	Poonam	Raghu – Chander's & Sudha's father
1982	Dial 100	Inspector Dalvi
1982	Ghazab	Munimji (Jamuna's Uncle)
1982	Dil... Akhir Dil Hai	Suraj Prakash (as Kishan Dhawan)
1982	Jawalaa Dahej Ki	(as Krishna Dhawan)
1982	Vidhaata	Ganpat
1983	Coolie	Maula Saab
1983	Kalaakaar	Mathur
1984	Wanted: Dead or Alive	
1984	Zindagi Jeene Ke Liye	(as Krishan Dhavan)
1985	Ram Teri Ganga Maili	Manilal
1985	Surkhiyaan (The Headlines)	Archarya
1986	Sasti Dulhan Mahenga Dulha	Radheshyam
1986	Pyaar Ke Do Pal	Geeta's dad
1986	Avinash	Police Commissioner Bhagat
1987	Insaniyat Ke Dushman	Defence lawyer
1987	Yaatna	Chetna's father
1988	7 Bijliyaan	Masterji
1988	Aakhri Adaalat	
1989	Guru	Uma's & Roma's dad (uncredited)
1989	Oonch Neech Beech	Gupta (as Krishanan Dhawan)
1989	Tujhe Nahin Chhodunga	
1989	Indira	Hazarilal
1990	Paap Ki Kamaee	
1991	Farishtay	Uncle 'Kaka' (as Kishan Dhawan)
1991	Khoon Ka Karz	College Principal
1991	Hai Meri Jaan	Rahim Chacha
1992	Jungle Ka Beta	
1992	Nishchaiy	Bal Gopal
1992	Apradhi	Chander's foster father
1992	Lambu Dada	Lambu's victim's father
1993	Ishq Aur Inteqaam	
1993	Sadhna	Sadhna's dad
1996	Muthi Bhar Zameen	Mr. Khanna
1997	Aakhri Sanghursh	Kajal's Father
