= Parivar (1956 film) =

- Directed by: Asit Sen
- Produced by: Bimal Roy
- Starring: Durga Khote; Usha Kiran; Sajjan; Paidi Jairaj
- Music by: Salil Chowdhury
- Release date: 1956
- Country: India
- Language: Hindi

Parivar is a 1956 Indian Hindi-language film produced by Bimal Roy and directed by Asit Sen. It was Sen's first Hindi feature. The film stars Durga Khote, Usha Kiran, Sajjan, and Paidi Jairaj; and features a soundtrack composed by Salil Chowdhury.

Film historian Firoze Rangoonwalla describes Parivar as a family drama that focuses on "typical problems of sentimental tug-of-war with a plea for unity". The film premiered in Bombay on 28 December 1956 and received praise for its theme and story from a Times of India critic.

Parivar marked the first onscreen "special appearance" of Kishore Kumar. He appears in "Kuen Mein Kudke Mar Jana", a comic, gibberish-style song-play at a family gathering. According to the authors of Kishore Kumar: The Ultimate Biography (2022), it is possibly the only song in which Kumar plays himself.

== Cast ==
- Durga Khote
- Usha Kiran
- Sabita Chatterjee
- Sajjan
- Paidi Jairaj
- Bipin Gupta
- Agha
- Sulochana Latkar
- Mohan Choti
- Dhumal
- Anwar Hussain
- Hiralal
- Kishore Kumar in a special appearance
