= Tum Haseen Main Jawaan =

- Poster
- Directed by: Bhappi Sonie
- Written by: Sachin Bhowmick; Anand Romani; Balbir Singh
- Starring: Dharmendra; Hema Malini; Pran
- Cinematography: Apurba Bhattacharjee
- Edited by: M. S. Shinde
- Music by: Shankar Jaikishan
- Release date: 24 July 1970
- Country: India
- Language: Hindi

Tum Haseen Main Jawan (transl. You are beautiful, I am young) is a 1970 Indian Hindi-language film directed by Bhappi Sonie. The film stars Dharmendra, Hema Malini, Pran, Helen and Rajindernath. This was the first pairing of Dharmendra with Hema Malini, who he later married.

== Plot ==
Raja Sahib dies leaving a will that proclaims that his grandchild will inherit all his wealth. The will also proclaims that the grandchild and the mother need to claim this by a certain date, failing so will transfer the wealth to Ranjeet (Pran), his nephew. In order to secure all the wealth, Ranjeet decides to kill the grandchild. To protect her sister’s son from Ranjeet, Anuradha (Hema Malini) hides the child, who through various circumstances ends up with Sunil a playboy,(Dharmendra) and a Navy officer who brings the child home and looks after him. To provide for the child, Sunil gives an advertisement for a nanny. Anuradha takes up the job to protect the child. Sunil and Anuradha fall in love with each other in the meanwhile. Unfortunately their plan to marry is thwarted by Ranjeet. Ranjeet later kidnaps the child and tries to kill him. Sunil is able to stop Ranjeet and rescue the child and return it to the mother.

== Cast ==
- Dharmendra... Sunil
- Hema Malini... Anuradha
- Pran... Ranjeet
- Rajendra Nath... Romeo
- Helen... Jina (Ranjeet's wife)
- Dhumal... Seth Ganpat Rao
- Sulochana Latkar... Sunil's mother
- Mohan Choti... Bansidhar
- Anwar Hussain... Captain Shamsher
- Anjali Kadam... Gayatri Devi
- Iftekhar... Raja Sahab (Anuradha's dad)
- Brahm Bhardwaj... Naval Doctor
- Brahmachari... Naval Officer
- Krishan Dhawan... Barrister Avinash
- Abhimanyu Sharma... Doctor Sharma
- C. S. Dubey... Zorawar Singh
- Gulshan... Shantaram - Driver (uncredited)
- Moolchand... Balding guy in black suit (uncredited)

== Soundtrack ==
No.	Title	Lyrics	Singer(s)	Length
1.	"Munne Ki Amma Yeh To Bata"	Rajinder Krishan	Kishore Kumar, Pankaj Udhas
2.	"Chehra Tera Allah Allah"	Hasrat Jaipuri	Mohammed Rafi
3.	"Dil Achha Hai, Achhi Hai Surat"	Indeevar	Mohammed Rafi
4.	"Aap Ko Pehle Bhi Kahin Dekha Hai"	Hasrat Jaipuri	Mohammed Rafi, Asha Bhosle
5.	"Chheenk Meri Jaan"	Hasrat Jaipuri	Asha Bhosle
6.	"Kaamdev Jaise Teri Suratiya"	Indeevar	Suman Kalyanpur
