= Bhappi Sonie =

Indian film director

Bhappi Sonie (31 July 1928 – 5 September 2001) was an Indian film director and producer, in Hindi cinema. He is best known for Shammi Kapoor and Dharmendra hit films, Janwar (1965) and Brahmachari (1968), and also won Filmfare Award for Best Film.

He started his career, assisting Raj Khosla in Milap (1955), C.I.D. (1956) and Solva Saal (1958), before making his directorial debut with Ek Phool Char Kaante starring Sunil Dutt and Waheeda Rehman.

He died on 5 September 2001, while undergoing a heart bypass surgery at Nanavati Hospital, in Mumbai, at the age of 73.

== Filmography ==
Filmography
Year	Title	Director	Producer	Writer	Notes
1958	Solva Saal			Yes	Dir. Raj Khosla; Dev Anand, Waheeda Rehman
1958	Kala Pani			Yes	Dir. Raj Khosla; Dev Anand, Madhubala,
1960	Ek Phool Char Kaante	Yes		Yes	
1965	Janwar	Yes			
1968	Brahmachari	Yes		Yes	Filmfare Award for Best Film
1969	Pyar Hi Pyar	Yes			
1969	Ek Shrimaan Ek Shrimati	Yes			
1970	Tum Haseen Main Jawaan	Yes	Yes		under Bhappi Sonie Productions
1971	Preetam	Yes	Yes		
1971	Jawan Mohabbat	Yes			
1973	Jheel Ke Us Paar	Yes	Yes		
1976	Bhanwar	Yes			
1977	Chalta Purza	Yes	Yes		
1980	Kismat Ki Baazi	Yes			Unfinished
1981	Jail Yatra	Yes			
1983	Bade Dil Wala	Yes	Yes		
1984	Sasti Dulhan Mahenga Dulha	Yes	Yes		
1991	Khoon Ka Karz		Yes		
1992	Nishchaiy		Yes		
