= Khoon Ka Karz =

- Poster
- Directed by: Mukul S. Anand
- Written by: Kader Khan (dialogues)
- Screenplay by: Mukul S. Anand
- Story by: Mukul S. Anand
- Produced by: Bhappi Sonie
- Starring: Vinod Khanna; Rajinikanth; Sanjay Dutt; Dimple Kapadia; Kimi Katkar; Sangeeta Bijlani
- Cinematography: W. B. Rao
- Edited by: A. Muthu
- Music by: Laxmikant–Pyarelal
- Production company: Bhappie Sonie Productions
- Release date: 1 March 1991
- Running time: 158 minutes
- Country: India
- Language: Hindi

Khoon Ka Karz (transl. Blood's Pay) is a 1991 Indian Hindi-language action crime film directed by Mukul S. Anand. It stars Vinod Khanna, Rajinikanth, Sanjay Dutt, Dimple Kapadia, Kimi Katkar, Sangeeta Bijlani and Kader Khan. The film deals with three individuals who are arrested for infringements under the Indian Penal Code: Karan (Vinod Khanna), Kishan (Rajinikanth) and Arjun (Sanjay Dutt) recount to the court how two of them were adopted and nursed by a saintly woman and how they fall in love with three women. It was dubbed and released in Tamil as Arasan: The Don in 2009, eighteen years after its original release.

== Plot ==
Arrested for a wide variety of infringements of the Indian Penal Code, Karan, Kishan and Arjun recount to the court how two of them were adopted and nursed by a saintly woman, Savitri Devi; how they fell in love with Tara, Sheetal and Sagarika respectively; how they took to crime; and how they ended up being arrested by the police and in their present predicament.

After good-hearted Savitri Devi (Sushma Seth) was robbed of her baby by her criminal husband, she started raising orphaned children in an ashram, teaching them about truth and honesty. But not all her children follow this path as grown-ups, like Arjun (Sanjay Dutt) and Kishan (Rajnikant). Society didn't grant them access to a better future because they are orphans and poor, so they took on the criminal path and got in with dubious Champaklal (Kader Khan), whose son Robin (Kiran Kumar) wants to establish a mighty mafia underworld in India.

But Karan (Vinod Khanna), another former foster child of Savitri's, gives them a rough time as Savitri has begged him to save Arjun and Kishan from the path of crime and dubious Champaklal alongside his hired Goons and his son Robin. For this purpose, Karan gets help from his love, tough taxi driver Tara Lele (Dimple Kapadia), and Kishan's and Arjun's girlfriends Sheetal (Kimi Katkar) and Sagarika (Sangeeta Bijlani). When Kishan and Arjun learn some unexpected truths, their aversion for Karan decreases and the three heroes unite to fight for the greater good against Champaklal and his son Robin whom is the real son of Savitri Devi.

== Cast ==
- Vinod Khanna as Karan, an orphan
- Rajinikanth as Kishan, a gang leader
- Sanjay Dutt as Arjun, a gang leader
- Dimple Kapadia as Tara
- Kimi Katkar as Sheetal
- Sangeeta Bijlani as Sagarika
- Sushma Seth as Savitri Devi
- Kader Khan as Champaklal
- Shakti Kapoor as Inspector P.K. Le Le
- Sudhir Pandey as Hariya
- Ashalata Wabgaonkar as Judge Sumitra Devi
- Bharat Kapoor as Corrupt Police Commissioner
- Mehmood Jr. as Assistant of Champaklal
- Kiran Kumar as Robin
- Aanjjan Srivastav as Boxer
- Dinesh Hingoo as Boxer's Manager

== Soundtrack ==
#	Song	Singer
1	"To Picture Hit Ho Jaye"	Amit Kumar, Alka Yagnik
2	"Kabhi Tum Hamse Karo"	Mohammed Aziz, Amit Kumar, Manhar Udhas, Alka Yagnik
3	"Mein Ik Pagal Ladki Hoon"	Sudesh Bhosle, Alka Yagnik
4	" Balma Main Muqadama"	Alka Yagnik, Mohammed Aziz
5	"Mujhe Maar Kar Meri Jaan"	Kavita Krishnamurthy
