= Chamatkar =

1992 Indian film by Rajiv Mehra

- Promotional Poster
- Directed by: Rajiv Mehra
- Screenplay by: Shaukat Baig; Rajiv Mehra
- Dialogues by: Lilliput
- Story by: Shaukat Baig
- Produced by: Parvesh C. Mehra
- Starring: Naseeruddin Shah; Shah Rukh Khan; Urmila Matondkar; Shammi Kapoor
- Cinematography: Carlton D'Mello
- Edited by: M. S. Shinde
- Music by: Songs: Anu Malik; Score: Vanraj Bhatia
- Production company: Eagle Films
- Release date: 7 August 1992
- Running time: 171 minutes
- Country: India
- Language: Hindi

Chamatkar (transl. Miracle) is a 1992 Indian Hindi-language romantic comedy fantasy film directed by Rajiv Mehra. The film stars Naseeruddin Shah, Shah Rukh Khan, and Urmila Matondkar in pivotal roles. Film critic Sukanya Verma has described it as a "loose adaptation" of Blackbeard's Ghost (1968). As of 2016, the rights of this film are owned by Khan's Red Chillies Entertainment.

== Plot ==
Sunder Srivastava is a young graduate. His main ambition in life is to fulfill his father's dream of starting a school on his half-acre property in his village, though he has no funds to execute his plans. Sunder's childhood friend Prem, a seasoned conman in Mumbai, convinces the gullible Sunder to give him his money in return of mortgage. When Sunder arrives in Mumbai, he is first tricked into losing his luggage, then pick-pocketed and loses any remaining cash he has left. He then figures out that Prem tricked him and fled to Dubai with his money. Sunder is then forced to take shelter in a cemetery due to his circumstances. He sits down on a tombstone, and starts cursing all the troubles in his life and venting his anger. A voice suddenly responds to him and a scared Sunder asks the person to identify himself. The source of the voice, who cannot be seen, is surprised that Sunder is able to hear him. He then asks Sunder whether the latter can really hear him.

Sunder realizes that he has been talking with a ghost and panics. The ghost suddenly becomes visible to Sunder and introduces himself as Amar Kumar AKA Marco. Marco tells Sunder that only he can help Sunder, and since Sunder is the only one that can hear/see him, only Sunder can help Marco. Marco then tells Sunder his sad tale: Marco was an underworld gangster who fell in love with Savitri Kaul, daughter of Mr. Kaul. Savitri refused Marco's efforts to marry her unless he changed his ways. To show that he was serious, Marco resolved to give up his life of crime. This did not bode well for his protégé Kunta, who wanted to become as big as Marco himself. On his wedding night, Marco was kidnapped and killed by Kunta, after which he was buried in the cemetery. After revealing his story to Sunder, Marco discloses to him that many crimes taking place in the city under his name are actually done by Kunta and his minions.

Marco tells Sunder that due to his sins, he cannot attain redemption and go to heaven. Marco was foretold by God that only his savior would be able to see and hear him, making Sunder the chosen one to help him. Sunder, frightened, refuses to help, but Marco unexpectedly reminds him about his dream of building a school, which Sunder never revealed to Marco. Marco's reminder persuades Sunder to help Marco, as long as Marco keeps his end of the bargain. Marco tells him that he wants to see Savitri and Mr. Kaul. He reveals to Sunder that he cannot touch or harm anybody until the time is right. Marco manages to get Sunder a position as a cricket coach in Mr. Kaul's school. Marco soon becomes angered and devastated when he finds out that after his murder, Kunta and his goons went to the Kaul household and told Savitri that Marco was alive and well, had fled India forever, and used Savitri to sleep with her. Kunta had told Savitri and her father that Marco wanted them to hand over the ownership documents for his hotel to Kunta (which Savitri was in possession of), but Savitri refused to hand them over unless Marco himself came back to ask for them. Kunta, furious, then tried to rape Savitri, but was stopped when her father broke down in tears, promising to give them the documents. Hearing all of this, Marco became furious and vows revenge. He is grieved to learn that Savitri died soon after that, but quickly becomes overjoyed when he learns that he has a daughter with Savitri named Mala.

Sunder and Marco also find out that the school lacks funding and that Kunta is trying to usurp its land. With the aid and assistance of Marco, Mala and Sunder soon start falling in love. Marco uses his ghost-like abilities to keep Kunta's goons from meddling in Mala and Sunder's affairs. Later, Marco shows a secret room to Sunder where he had kept all his loot. The room was not known to Kunta or anybody else, so Marco proposes that the two of them make an anonymous donation, saving the school, and leaving enough money to help Sunder with his dream. However, due to their oversight, Kunta finds out the location of the room, and Marco's money is quickly stolen and used for evil activities. Marco, in a one-liner, refers to Kunta as "Woh Kunta saala" ("that rogue Kunta"). In a desperate bid to regain the lost money, Marco steals some money and bets to double the money. Sunder is held responsible for the theft, although no proof is present. Marco, hoping to solve this unfortunate event, tells the truth to Sunder about stealing the money, causing them to have an argument.

After being released from prison, Sunder agrees to a cricket match between his team and a team headed by Kunta's nephew. It is decided that if Sunder's team wins the game, they will win the funds to keep the school. Initially, Sunder's team is losing, but Marco then steps into the game (still invisible to everyone), sabotages the opponent team, which not only wins Sunder over again to his side, but also helps lead Sunder's team to a giant victory.

Although everything seems to be going well, Sunder accidentally slips up and reveals to IG Tripathi, the inspector who investigated Marco's life, the truth about Marco's ghost returning. Additionally, Sunder has a conversation with Kunta before the match, and mentions Marco's ghost, causing Kunta to become extremely suspicious. During the match, Kunta abducts Sunder and Mala and attempts to bury them alive in the very place he had buried Marco. Marco manages to lead the police to the cemetery to save Sunder and Mala, where Kunta and his goons fight against Marco, Mala, Sunder, and the police. After succeeding in beating up the goons, Marco starts to strangle Kunta with a rope while Sunder forces Kunta to confess his role in Marco's murder. Marco then pushes Kunta into the empty grave and as he is about to kill him with a large rock, Mala calls out for him to stop, calling him "father" and entreating not to kill and sully his hands with blood because of Kunta. On hearing this, Marco immediately relents and lets Kunta live.

Finally, Sunder succeeds in his mission of redeeming Marco's name. Sunder and Mala get married, with Marco attending the wedding. At the wedding, a ray of light falls upon Marco who then ascends to heaven, although not before asking for "a minute" to entreat the viewer to do the right thing while they are alive, because they may not have the chance to set things right after death.

== Cast ==
- Shahrukh Khan as Sunder Srivastav
- Naseeruddin Shah as Amar Kumar, a.k.a. Marco
- Urmila Matondkar as Mala Kumar
- Shammi Kapoor as Mr. Kaul
- Malvika Tiwari as Savitri Kaul
- Deven Verma as Inspector P. K. Sant
- Tinnu Anand as Kunta
- Ashutosh Gowariker as Monty
- Ali Asgar as Rakesh
- Rakesh Bedi as Moti
- Johnny Lever as Battery Clerk / Cricket Commentator
- Guddi Maruti as She-Girl
- Suhas Khandke as Raj Mehta, Hotel Owner
- Anjana Mumtaz as Mrs. Kaushalya Mehta
- Aanjjan Srivastav as IG Tripathi
- Shreechand Makhija as Dayal College Principal
- Ravi Patwardhan as Village Zamindar
- Avinash Kharshikar as Prem
- Arun Bakshi as Umpire
- Gavin Packard as Gunga
- Achyut Potdar as Railway TC

== Soundtrack ==
The music was composed by Anu Malik, with the lyrics being written by Anand Bakshi.

=== Track listing ===
#	Song	Singer
1.	"Is Pyar Se Meri Taraf Na Dekho"	Kumar Sanu, Alka Yagnik
2.	"O Meri Neendein Churane"	Asha Bhosle, Kumar Sanu
3.	"Yeh Hai Pyar Pyar"	Asha Bhosle, Kumar Sanu
4.	"Is Pyar Se Meri Taraf Na Dekho" (Male)	Kumar Sanu
5.	"Bichoo O Bichoo"	Asha Bhosle
6.	"Dekho Dekho Chamatkar"	Kumar Sanu, Sukhwinder Singh, Nandu Bhende
7.	"Jawani Deewani"	Udit Narayan, Poornima

== See also ==
- List of ghost films
