= Ladki Pasand Hai =

- Directed by: C.L. Rawal
- Starring: Mumtaz
- Release date: 1971
- Country: India
- Language: Hindi

Ladki Pasand Hai (transl. The girl is likeable) is a 1971 Bollywood drama film directed by C.L. Rawal. The film stars Mumtaz.

== Cast ==
- Mumtaz
- Jeevan
- Deepak Kumar (actor)
- Manmohan
- Manorama
- Mehmood Jr.
- Rajendra Nath
- Randhir
- Sajjan
- Sindhu
- Sulochana
- Tabassum

== Songs ==
1. "Tu Kar De Nazar Se Mastana Main Cheez Hai Kya" – Hemlata, Mukesh
2. "Maan Bhi Jao Sanam Ruth Ke Jaya Na Karo" – Mohammed Rafi
3. "Vafaa Ke Naam Par Mitanaa, Agar Tu Aabaru Apani" – Mukesh
4. "Zulfon Me Chupana Kya, Main Apne DilMein" – Hemlata, Mohammed Rafi
5. "Jawani Phir Na Aayegi mahobbat phir" – Hemlata
6. "Pappa Humse Pyar Karo" – Hemlata, Sulakshana Pandit, Usha Timothy
7. "Ho Bhala Pyar Ka Ek Ho Gaye Begane Do" – Mahendra Kapoor, Mumtaz
8. "Kaha Le Kar Jaye Ye Tuta Hua Dil" – Lata Mangeshkar
