= Avinash (film) =

1986 Indian Hindi Film

- Poster
- Directed by: Umesh Mehra
- Written by: Umesh Mehra; Ravi Kapoor; Mohan Kaul; Anand Kaushal; Javed Siddiqui
- Produced by: Kavita Ramsay
- Starring: Mithun Chakraborty; Parveen Babi; Poonam Dhillon
- Music by: Bappi Lahiri; Lyrics: Amit Khanna & Farooq Kaisser
- Production company: Ramsay Films
- Release date: 12 December 1986 (India)
- Running time: 145 min.
- Language: Hindi

Avinash is a 1986 Hindi-language Indian action thriller film directed by Umesh Mehra, starring Mithun Chakraborty, Parveen Babi, Poonam Dhillon, Prem Chopra, Tom Alter, Avtar Gill and Sujit Kumar. Mithun Chakraborty dancing to the title card was a huge rage those days. In fact, no other movie ever attempted to show their hero dancing in front of the "Title Card".

== Plot ==
Avinash (Mithun) is a dancer and singer in a club. One of his friends captures the terrorist activities of Pratap when Pratap's man are behind him, and he runs away with the film. He is killed in front of Avinash and drops the film in a drum kept on the stage where Avinash was performing. Pratap believes he has handed over the film to him and tortures his brother Sumit and fiancé Sapna killing his mother. Avinash is assaulted and tortured to get the film he manages to escape but gets shot in his head. Dr Anand, a drunkard, saves Avinash's life by removing the bullet from his head. But Avinash loses his memory. Pratap's man are still chasing him to get the film when he is saved by a mysterious women Nisha who tells him that they both loved each other. Nisha actually came into his life to get the film but dies in an explosion telling him her motive. Then Alka, another women, enters his life and claims that he is her husband.

== Cast ==
- Mithun Chakraborty ... Avinash Sharma "Avi"
- Parveen Babi ... Nisha
- Poonam Dhillon ... Dr. Sapna
- Bindiya Goswami ... Alka
- Prem Chopra ... Pratap
- Sujit Kumar ... Inspector Rajan / Zafar / Harnam
- Vijay Arora ... Doctor
- Sudhir Dalvi ... Dr. Anand
- Anil Dhawan ... Deepak
- Tom Alter...Tom
- Sulabha Arya ... Bhavna ,Avinash's mom
- Ravi Behl ...Sumit
- Bob Christo ...Bob
- Krishan Dhawan ...Police Commissioner Bhagat
- Avtar Gill ...C.I.D. Inspector Dsouza
- T. P. Jain ...Adambhai
- Sujit Kumar...Police Inspector Rajan
- Pinchoo Kapoor ... Senior Police Officer Din Dayal
- Imtiaz Khan ...Pratap's Associate Kundan
- Viju Khote ... Superfast Jasoos Damodar
- Raj Kishore ... Superfast Jasoos Darpan
- Yunus Parvez... Superfast Jasoos Saxena
- Mac Mohan ...Mac
- Kalpana Iyer...Cabaret Dancer at Red Fire Club

== Soundtrack ==
Amit Khanna wrote all the songs. The song "Teri Jo Khushi" is copied from "Beat It" by American singer/songwriter Michael Jackson

#	Title	Singer(s)
1	"Jaaga Soya Pyar Yeh Mera" (version 1)	Kishore Kumar, Anupama Deshpande
2	"Jaaga Soya Pyar Yeh Mera" (version 2)	Kishore Kumar, Anupama Deshpande
3	"Yeh Pehli Mulakat Hai"	Bappi Lahiri, Asha Bhosle
4	"Teri Jo Khushi"	Bappi Lahiri
5	"Danger Danger Kabhie Kabhie"	Alisha Chinai
