= Brahmachari (1968 Hindi film) =

- Directed by: Bhappi Sonie
- Written by: Sachin Bhowmick
- Produced by: G.P. Sippy
- Starring: Shammi Kapoor; Rajshree; Pran; Mumtaz
- Cinematography: Taru Dutt
- Edited by: M. S. Shinde
- Music by: Shankar Jaikishan
- Distributed by: Sippy Films
- Release date: 26 April 1968
- Country: India
- Language: Hindi

Brahmachari (transl. Celibate) is a 1968 Indian film. Written by Sachin Bhowmick, it is a G. P. and Ramesh Sippy production directed by Bhappi Sonie. The film stars Shammi Kapoor, Rajshree, Pran, Mumtaz, Jagdeep, Sachin and Asit Sen. The music was by Shankar Jaikishan. The film became a box office Super Hit and won several awards, including Filmfare Best Movie Award.

It was later remade in Tamil as Enga Mama (1970) and in Telugu as Devudu Mamayya (1981). The film's main theme was also an inspiration for the 1987 film Mr. India.

== Plot ==
Brahmachari (Shammi Kapoor), an orphan with no identity, takes care of many orphans in his own home. One day he saves a young woman Sheetal (Rajshree) from committing suicide. She's in love with Ravi Khanna (Pran) who is promiscuous. Brahmachari promises to unite her with Ravi in return for money. While working day and night on her appearance to make Ravi like her, Brahmachari falls in love with her.

When Ravi eventually proposes, Sheetal realises she is in love with Brahmachari. Ravi brings pressure on Brahmachari in the form of forfeiture of the mortgage on Brahmachari's house, due to non-repayment of loans. Ravi negotiates with Brahmachari to give up Sheetal in exchange for payment of his mortgage dues. Brahmachari who is poor and has to take care of the orphans living with him, reluctantly agrees.

In order to convince Sheetal, Brahmachari pretends to be romantically involved with Roopa. However, when Roopa tries to leave her newborn child at Brahmachari's house, Brahmachari finds out that Ravi is the father of the child. He also gets hold of love letters written by Ravi to Roopa and tries to convince Ravi to marry Roopa. Ravi does not relent and instead orders the kidnapping of Brahmachari's orphans. A fight ensues and the children are rescued. A repentant Ravi apologizes to Brahmachari and agrees to marry Rupa. Brahmachari and Sheetal get married and along with the children, set off on a road trip in Brahmachari's car.

== Cast ==
- Shammi Kapoor as Brahmchari
- Rajshree as Sheetal Chaudhary
- Pran as Ravi Khanna
- Mumtaz as Roopa Sharma
- Brahm Bhardwaj as newspaper editor
- Sachin as child actor
- Jagdeep as Murli Manohar
- Mohan Choti as Choti
- Dhumal as Kirtandas
- Manmohan as Basant
- Baby Farida as Chandni
- Mehmood Junior
- Meena Rai as Bela Ravi Khanna girlfriend at party
- Asit Sen

== Soundtrack ==
Song	Singer(s)	Lyricist	Raga
"Aajkal Tere Mere Pyar Ke Charche"	Mohammed Rafi, Suman Kalyanpur	Hasrat Jaipuri	
"Dil Ke Jharokhe Mein"	Mohammed Rafi	Hasrat Jaipuri	Shivaranjani
"Tu Bemisaal Hain (Teri Tarif Kya Karoon)"	Mohammed Rafi	Hasrat Jaipuri	
"Chakke Men Chakka Chakke Pe Gaadi"	Mohammed Rafi	Shailendra	
"Main Gaoon Tum So Jao"	Mohammed Rafi	Shailendra	
"Mohabbat Ke Khuda"	Mohammed Rafi	Rajendra Krishan	

Music scholar and film expert Rajesh Subramanian opines that the song "Aajkal Tere Mere Pyar Ke Charche" was a rejected tune for another film, which a depressed Jaikishan played to Shammi Kapoor at Hotel Gaylord. Kapoor found the tune very catchy and suggested to director Bhappi Sonie to include the song in Brahmachari. The song became one of the highlights of the film. The song is sung by Suman Kalyanpur but sometimes confused to be Lata Mangeshkar's because the quality of their voices are similar at times.

== Awards and nominations ==
16th Filmfare Awards:

Won

- Best Film – G. P. Sippy
- Best Actor – Shammi Kapoor
- Best Music Director – Shankar–Jaikishan
- Best Lyricist – Shailendra for "Main Gaoon Tum"
- Best Male Playback Singer – Mohammad Rafi for "Dil Ke Jharonkhe Mein"
- Best Story – Sachin Bhowmick

Nominated

- Best Director – Bhappi Sonie
- Best Lyricist – Hasrat Jaipuri for "Dil Ke Jharonkhe Mein"
- Best Male Playback Singer – Mohammad Rafi for "Main Gaoon Tum"

Other Awards:

- 1969 BFJA Award for Best Supporting Actress (Hindi Section) — Mumtaz
- 1969 BFJA Award for Best Music Director (Hindi Section) — Shankar Jaikishan
- 1969 BFJA Award for Best Editor (Hindi Section) — M. S. Shinde
