= Ek Phool Char Kante =

- Directed by: Bhappi Sonie
- Starring: Sunil Dutt; Waheeda Rehman
- Music by: Shankar Jaikishan
- Release date: 1960
- Country: India
- Language: Hindi

Ek Phool Char Kante (transl. One flower, four thorns) is a 1960 Hindi film directed by Bhappi Sonie in his directorial debut. The film stars Sunil Dutt, Waheeda Rehman, Johnny Walker, Gopi and Tun Tun. The film's music is by Shankar Jaikishan.

The film included the famous songs "Beautiful Baby of Broadway", "Bombshell Baby of Bombay" sang by (Iqbal Singh Sethi) and Matwali Naar Thumak Thumak Chali Jaaye".

== Plot ==
The film is a light-hearted comic love story, wherein Sunil Dutt falls in love with a "phool" Sushma(Waheeda Rehman) but has to impress her four uncles, the "kante" (thorns) of the title. Each uncle has a different idiosyncrasy and Sunil Dutt pretends to be an expert in that field in order to impress that particular uncle. First Uncle Dhumal a religious fanatic he pretends as a religious scholar (Vidyartthi). Second Uncle David an acting fanatic he impresses as a versatile Actor. The four uncles select their protégé for their niece, not knowing that each is selecting the same boy. When the boy whom they have approved disappears, they agree to marry their niece off to her choice, who is Sunil Dutt again.

== Cast ==
- Sunil Dutt as Sanjeev
- Waheeda Rehman as Sushma
- Krishan Dhawan as Shyam ( Sanjeev s friend)
- Mohan Choti as Sanjeevs house servant.
- Tun Tun as Jamuna ( Sushmas Caretaker)
- Sulochana Latkar
- Bir Sakuja as Sanjeevs father
- Iqbal Singh Sethi
- Mumtaz Begum as Sanjeev"s mother
- David Abraham as Uncle No 1 (cinema fanatic)
- Johnny Walker as Uncle - 2 (rock n roll fanatic)
- Rashid Khan as Uncle - 3 (yoga fanatic)
- Dhumal as Uncle - 4 (religious fanatic)
- Bela Bose as Sushma s friend
- Bindu as Sushma s friend

== Soundtrack ==
#	Title	Singer(s)	Lyricist	Raga
1.	"Banwari Re Jeene Ka Sahara"	Lata Mangeshkar	Hasrat Jaipuri	Pilu
2.	"Ankhon Mein Rang Kyon Aaya"	Mukesh, Lata Mangeshkar	Hasrat Jaipuri	
3.	"Dil Ae Dil Baharon Se Mil"	Talat Mahmood, Lata Mangeshkar	Shailendra	
4.	"Matwali Naar Thumak Thumak"	Mukesh	Shailendra	
5.	"Baby Of Bombay"	Iqbal Singh	Shailendra	
6.	"O Meri Baby Doll"	Mohammed Rafi	Shailendra	
7.	"Sambhal Ke Karna Jo Kuchh Karna"	Mukesh	Shailendra	
8.	"Soch Rahi Thi Kahoon Na Kahoon"	Lata Mangeshkar	Shailendra	
9	"Tirchi Nazar Se Yun Na Dekh"	Mohammed Rafi	Hasrat Jaipuri	
