= Sohni Mahiwal (1984 film) =

Sohni Mahiwal Легенда о любви
- India theatrical release poster
- Directed by: Umesh Mehra (Hindi); Latif Faiziev (Russian)
- Screenplay by: Umesh Mehra; Javed Siddiqui; Shanti Prakash Bakshi; Latif Faiziev; Oʻlmas Umarbekov
- Dialogues by: Javed Siddiqui (Hindi); Oʻlmas Umarbekov (Russian)
- Story by: Umesh Mehra; Javed Siddiqui; Shanti Prakash Bakshi; Latif Faiziev; Oʻlmas Umarbekov
- Based on: Sohni Mahiwal (Punjabi folklore)
- Produced by: F. C. Mehra
- Starring: Sunny Deol; Poonam Dhillon; Zeenat Aman; Shammi Kapoor; Tanuja; Pran
- Cinematography: Abduliev Duran; S. Pappu
- Edited by: M. S. Shinde (Hindi); M. Makarova (Russian)
- Music by: Score: Vladimir Milov; Songs: Anu Malik
- Production companies: Eagle Films; Sovinfilm; Uzbekfilm
- Distributed by: India: Eagle Films; Soviet Union: Sovinfilm; Soviet Uzbekistan: Uzbekfilm
- Release dates: 29 June 1984 (India); December 1984 (Soviet Union)
- Running time: 142 min
- Countries: India; Soviet Union
- Languages: Hindi; Russian
- Box office: ₹7.20 crore (equivalent to ₹123 crore or US$13 million in 2026) (net)

Sohni Mahiwal (Russian: Легенда о любви, romanized: Legenda o lyubvi) is a 1984 Indo-Soviet epic historical romance drama film based on the Punjabi folk of love and tragedy of the same name, directed by Umesh Mehra (India) and Latif Faiziev (Soviet Union). It stars Sunny Deol, Poonam Dhillon and Zeenat Aman in pivotal roles.

The film Sohni Mahiwal is a historical romance drama that retells the classic Punjabi folk tragedy. The story was a collaboration between Indian and Soviet filmmakers. The film captured the tragic essence of this legendary folk tale, portraying the depth of lead characters’ love and the societal pressures that led to their heartbreaking demise.

The story of the film was written by Javed Siddiqui, Shanti Prakash Bakshi and Oʻlmas Umarbekov. The music was scored by Anu Malik. The film was a commercial success with a net collection of ₹7.2 crore.

== Plot ==
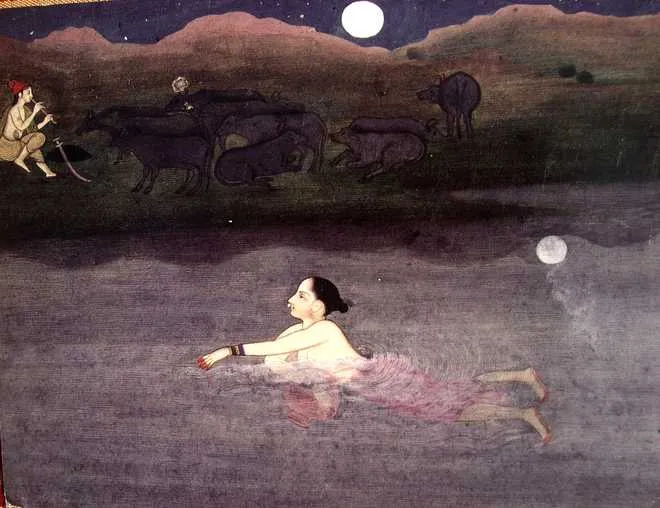
Painting depicting Sohni crossing the Chenab river using Ghada and Mahiwal waiting for her on the other side

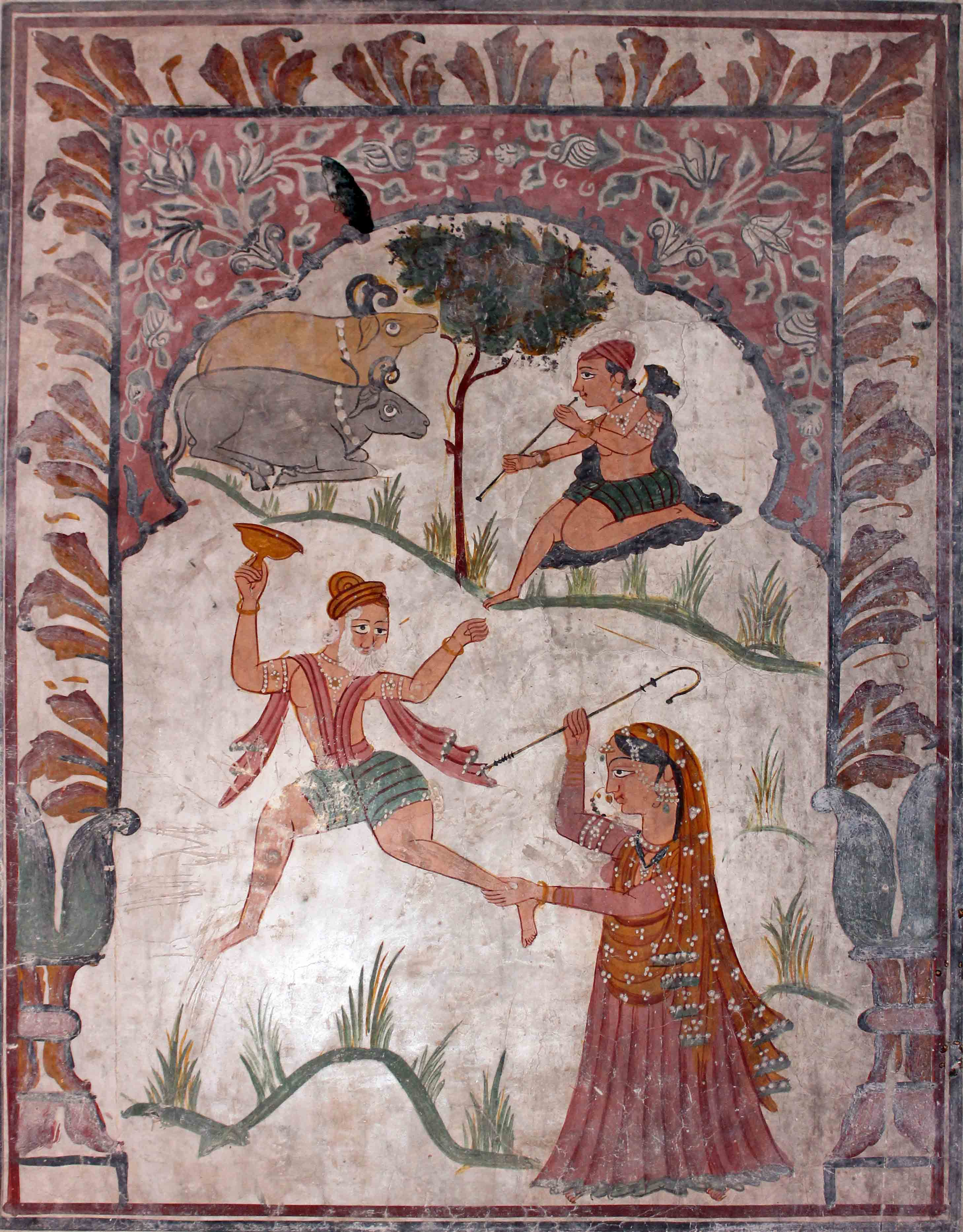
Mural of Sohni Mahiwal folk tale from Sui Simbli temple in Jammu and Kashmir

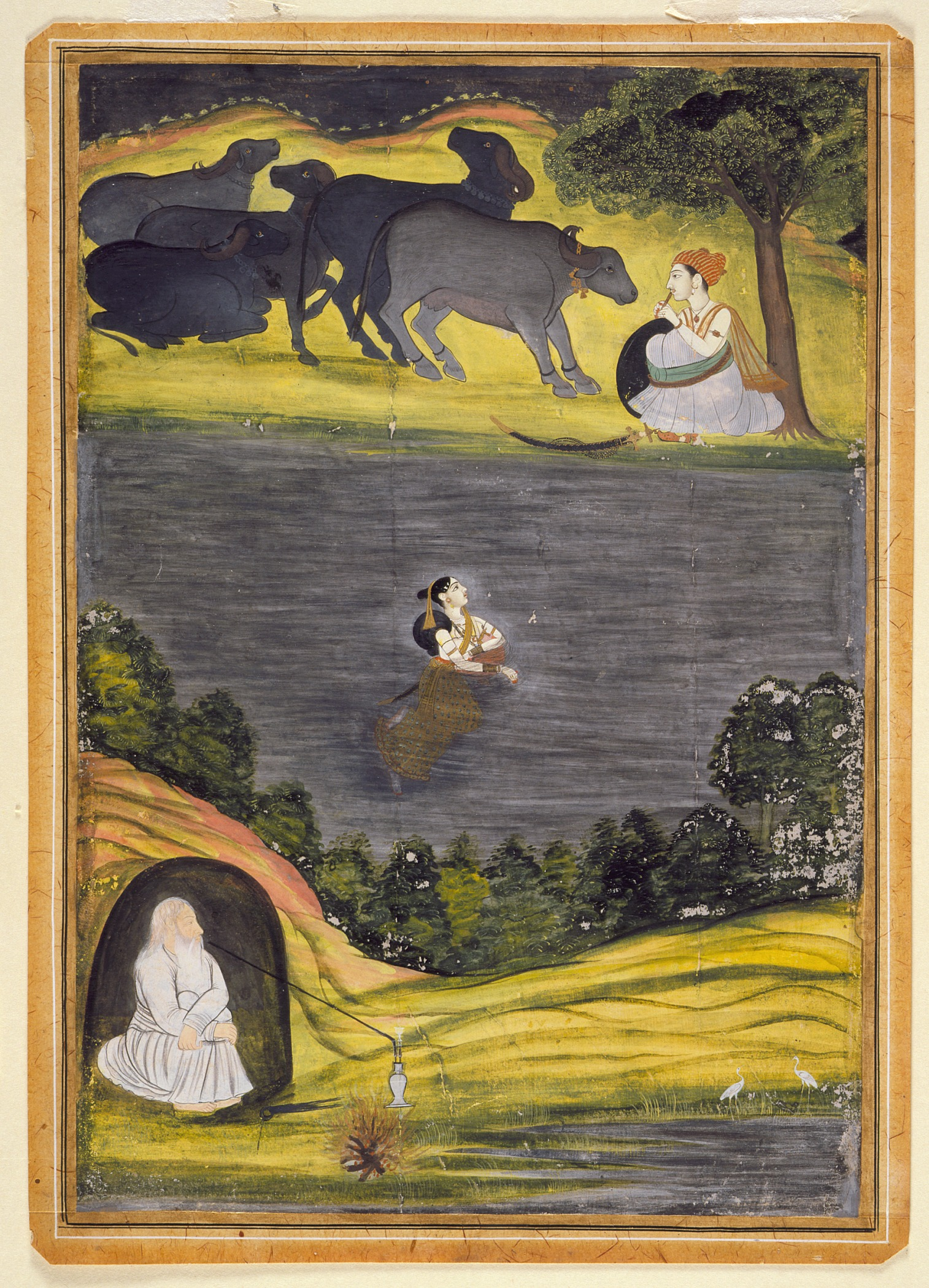
Sohni swims to meet her lover Mahiwal

The story is set in Punjab, where a rich trader named Mirza Izzat Beg arrives with his caravan from Bukhara (Uzbekistan). He stops in a town located on the banks of the Chenab river where he meets Sohni, the beautiful daughter of a potter named Tulla. Sohni runs a shop where she sells her family's pottery. Izzat Beg is instantly smitten with her and, just to get a chance to see her, he buys pots and mugs from her every day. Sohni is also attracted to him, and their love begins to blossom. To stay close to her, Izzat Beg decides to stay behind and not return to Bukhara with his caravan. He takes on the job of a servant in Tulla's house, herding their buffaloes, and soon earns the nickname – Mahiwal, which means buffalo herder.

Their love becomes a scandal in the community, as it's unacceptable for a girl from the potter community to be with an outsider. To end the relationship, Sohni's parents quickly arrange her marriage to another potter. Distraught and helpless, Sohni is forcefully married off and sent to her husband's home. Mahiwal becomes a hermit and finds a small hut on the other side of the Chenab river, across from Sohni's new home.

Despite the physical separation, their love endures. Every night, under the cover of darkness, Mahiwal comes to the riverside. Sohni, using a Ghada (hard-baked earthenware pot) for flotation, swims across the treacherous river to meet him. Their secret rendezvous are filled with love and devotion. It is said that once, when Mahiwal couldn't catch a fish for Sohni, he cut a piece of flesh from his own thigh to roast for her. When Sohni discovered this, her love for him grew even stronger.

The whispers of their clandestine meetings eventually reach Sohni's family. Her evil sister-in-law follows her and discovers where Sohni hides her earthenware pot. Filled with malice and a desire to end the affair, the sister-in-law replaces the hard-baked ghada with an unbaked one, which looks identical. The next night, Sohni, unaware of the trap, uses the unbaked ghada to cross the river. The Ghada dissolves in the water, and Sohni begins to drown. From the other side of the river, Mahiwal sees her in distress and jumps in to save her. The strong currents of the Chenab river claim both their lives, and the lovers are reunited in death.

== Cast ==
- Sunny Deol as Mirza Izzat Beg / Mahiwal, Sohni’s boyfriend
- Poonam Dhillon as Sohni, Mahiwal’s girlfriend
- Zeenat Aman as Zarina
- Tanuja as Tulla's wife, Sohni's Mother
- Pran as Tulla, Sohni's father
- Frunzik Mkrtchyan as Razboynik Barmandu, Warrior
- Zikir Muhammadjonov as Ismail Beg, Mahiwal's father
- Tamar Hovhannisyan as Mahiwal’s mother
- Gulchekhra Dzhamilova as Malkani
- Natalya Krachkovskaya as the woman in Mahiwal’s caravan
- Nabi Rahimov as Bashi, Mahiwal's uncle
- Gulshan Grover as Noor
- Rakesh Bedi as Salamat, Mahiwal's servant and friend
- Shammi Kapoor (special appearance) as Peer Baba
- Mehar Mittal
- Farida Dadi
- Mazhar Khan (special appearance) as Rashid
- Uchkun Rakhmanov as Man in the caravan
- Sanat Divanov as Bodyguard
- Zulkhumor Muminova as Salamati, Salamat's beloved
- Mashrab Kimsanov
- Matyoqub Matchanov
- Isamat Ergashev as Djardu, Malkani's brother, Mahiwal's friend
- Yuri Sarantsev

== Music and soundtrack ==
The background score of the movie was done by Vladimir Milov.

The music for the film's songs was composed by Anu Malik and the lyrics of the songs were penned by Anand Bakshi.

It was a successful soundtrack which received critical acclaim. It earned Malik, his first nomination for the Filmfare Award for Best Music Director and Bakshi received a nomination for penning the lyrics of "Sohni Chenab De Kinare". Anupama Deshpande won the Filmfare Award for Best Female Playback Singer for the song.

Sohni Mahiwal

Soundtrack album by Anu Malik
- Released: 1984
- Recorded: 1984
- Genre: Film soundtrack
- Label: Music India

Anu Malik chronology
Aasmaan (1983)	Sohni Mahiwal (1984)	Love Marriage (1984)

=== Track listing ===
No.	Title	Singer(s)	Length
1.	"Sohni Meri Sohni Aur Nahin Koi Honi"	Asha Bhosle, Anwar
2.	"Mujhe Dulhe Ka Sehra Gaane Do"	Asha Bhosle, Shabbir Kumar
3.	"Bol Do Meethe Bol Soniye"	Asha Bhosle, Shabbir Kumar
4.	"Chand Ruka Hai, Raat Ruki Hai"	Asha Bhosle
5.	"Sohni Chenab De Kinare (Happy)"	Anupama Deshpande
6.	"Sohni Chenab De Kinare (Sad)"	Anupama Deshpande

== Awards ==
32nd Filmfare Awards:

Won

- Best Female Playback Singer – Anupama Deshpande for "Sohni Chenab De"
- Best Editing – M. S. Shinde
- Best Sound Design – Brahmanand Sharma

Nominated

- Best Music Director – Anu Malik
- Best Lyricist – Anand Bakshi for "Sohni Chenab De"

== See also ==
Other Indo-Soviet films:

- Alibaba aur 40 Chor
- Ajooba
