= Preetam =

- Poster
- Directed by: Bhappi Sonie
- Starring: Shammi Kapoor; Leena Chandavarkar
- Cinematography: Apurba Bhattacharjee
- Edited by: M. S. Shinde
- Music by: Shankar Jaikishan
- Release date: 26 July 1971
- Country: India
- Language: Hindi

Preetam is a 1971 Bollywood romance film directed by Bhappi Sonie. The film stars Shammi Kapoor and Leena Chandavarkar.

== Cast ==
- Shammi Kapoor as Preetam Thakur / Preetam Rana (Special appearance)
- Leena Chandavarkar as Sharan Sinha / Bindiya
- Vinod Khanna as Anil Thakur
- Helen as Sarita
- Mehmood as Barber Safachat
- Raj Mehra as Mr. Thakur
- Sulochana Latkar as Mrs. Thakur
- Ramayan Tiwari as Rana
- Anwar Hussain as Daroga Ram Sahay Singh
- Manmohan as Pyare
- Malika as Dr. Chhaya Dutt
- Vasant Mahajan as Vasant
- Birbal as Member of Preetam's party
- Kumari Naaz as Gauri
- Dhumal as Gauri's Father
- Brahm Bhardwaj as Judge B.N. Sinha
- Urmila Bhatt as Urmila Sinha
- Raj Kishore as Havaldar 913
- Ravikant as (as Ravi Kant)
- Moolchand as Train Guard

== Soundtrack ==
Song	Singer
"Sher Se Ladne Aayi Dekho"	Mohammed Rafi
"Chaal Suhani, Baat Raseeli"	Mohammed Rafi
"Yennana Idd"	Manna Dey
"Na Humne Yeh Sochke"	Manna Dey
"Charche Gali Gali"	Lata Mangeshkar
"Hum Bhi Shikari"	Asha Bhosle
