= Chhota Bhai =

- Directed by: K. Pratyagatma
- Screenplay by: Inder Raj Anand
- Story by: Ramer Sumati by Sarat Chandra Chattopadhyay
- Produced by: T. M. Kittu; A. V. Subramaniam
- Starring: Nutan; Rehman; Lalita Pawar; Sulochana Chatterjee
- Cinematography: V. K. Murthy
- Edited by: N. M. Shankar
- Music by: Laxmikant–Pyarelal
- Release date: 1966
- Country: India
- Language: Hindi

Chhota Bhai is a Hindi drama film directed by K. Pratyagatma, based on 1914 Bengali novel Ramer Sumati of Sarat Chandra Chattopadhyay. This film was released in 1966 under the banner of Venus Pictures. The film's music was composed by the duo Laxmikant–Pyarelal.

== Plot ==
Annapoorna and her husband Dewan live in a happy family life along with Ramu, the step brother of Dewan. Annapoorna promises to her dying stepmother-in-law, that she will take full responsibility of Ramu. Annapoorna brought up Ramu as her own child and has deep maternal affection for him. But problem arises when Annapoorna's mother comes to their home.

== Cast ==
- Nutan as Annapoorna
- Rehman as Dewan
- Master Mahesh Kumar as Ramu
- Lalita Pawar
- Nasir Hussain
- Gajanan Jagirdar
- Sulochana Chatterjee as Parvathi
- Brahm Bhardwaj as Doctor
- Marutirao Parab
- Lata Sinha as Kali
- Chandrima Bhaduri

== External link ==
- Chhota Bhai at IMDb
