= Main Tere Liye =

- Directed by: Vijay Anand
- Produced by: Dev Anand
- Starring: Rajendra Kumar; Asha Parekh; Suneil Anand; Meenakshi Sheshadri
- Cinematography: Jal Mistry
- Music by: Bappi Lahiri
- Release date: 1989
- Running time: 130 minutes
- Country: India
- Language: Hindi

Main Tere Liye is a 1989 Indian Bollywood film directed by Vijay Anand and produced by Dev Anand. The film stars Rajendra Kumar, Asha Parekh, Suneil Anand, Meenakshi Sheshadri in lead roles.

== Cast ==
- Rajendra Kumar as Shiva
- Asha Parekh as Preeti
- Suneil Anand as Ajit
- Meenakshi Seshadri as Rinku
- Gulshan Grover as Harish Saxena "Harry"
- Puneet Issar as Ramesh Saxena
- Sudhir as Dinesh Saxena
- Shashikala as Anjana Saxena
- Om Shivpuri as Makkad Saxena
- Iftekhar as Advocate Mehta
- Marc Zuber as Ajit Saxena

== Production ==
Suniel Anand, Dev Anand's son, was cast in the film, in one of the only films he acted in. According to Suparn Verma from Rediff.com, the film "made to kickstart the dead-on-arrival career of Dev Anand's son, Suniel", without much success. This idea was repeated by Asha Parekh, who said Dev Anand produced the film "to launch his son Suneil".

== Soundtrack ==
The film's music is composed by Bappi Lahiri. Vijay Anand wrote the lyrics.

Song	Singer
"Main Tere Liye"	Amit Kumar, S. Janaki
"Vaada Nibha Do"	Amit Kumar
"Awaaz De Tu Kahan"	Amit Kumar
"Jane Se Lagte Ho"	Bappi Lahiri
"Guru Bin Kaise"	Anup Ghoshal
"Man Ke Mandir Mein"	Anup Ghoshal

== Reception ==
The film's music was received well, but it did not do well at the box office. Bombay: The City Magazine wrote of the film's music, "There are six songs in this collection and despite Bappi Lahiri's uncontrollable urge to give them the rock-n-roll form, at least four of them stand out."
