= Pyar Hi Pyar =

- Poster
- Directed by: Bhappi Sonie
- Written by: K. A. Narayan; Anand Romani
- Produced by: Rajaram, Satish Wagle
- Starring: Dharmendra; Vyjayanthimala; Pran
- Cinematography: Taru Dutt
- Edited by: Hrishikesh Mukherjee
- Music by: Shankar Jaikishan
- Release date: 17 October 1969
- Country: India
- Language: Hindi

Pyar Hi Pyar ("Love, only love") is a 1969 Bollywood film produced by Rajaram and Satish Wagle, and directed by Bhappi Sonie. The film stars Dharmendra, Vyjayanthimala, Pran, Helen, Madan Puri and Mehmood. It is the first Hindi film to feature a song performed entirely in an escalator.

== Plot ==
Vijay finds employment as a police inspector, much to his father Kailashnath's displeasure. Vijay's first assignment is to locate a beautiful young woman's missing father. Vijay falls head-over-heels in love with the young woman (Kavita). Vijay sets about to find her father. In the meantime another young man convinces Kailashnath that he is his real son and that Vijay is not who he claims to be.

== Cast ==
- Dharmendra as Vijay Pratap Gupta
- Vyjayanthimala as Kavita
- Pran as Satish Raj / Ashok
- Mehmood as Gogo
- Helen as Cham Cham
- Madan Puri as Dindayal
- Dhumal as Jattadhari
- Raj Mehra as Kailashnath Gupta
- D. K. Sapru as Diwan
- Manmohan as Shyam Kumar
- Sulochana Latkar as Yashoda
- Sulochana Chatterjee as Laxmi
- Krishan Dhawan as Kewal Mehra
- Mehmood Jr. as Mehmood Ali
- Salim Khan as Drummer
- Shatrughan Sinha as Uncredited Villain
- Paro Devi as Savitri Devi
- Padmarani as Kavita's friend
- Sadhana Patel as Kavita's friend
- Yunus Bihari as Henchman
- Robert as Dancer in the song 'Tu Mera, main Teri.. '
- Moolchand as Masseur of Jataadhari

== Soundtrack ==
Mohammed Rafi sang for Dharmendra and Mehmood in the same film. "Agogo Ageya" was for Mehmood and the rest of the songs were for Dharmendra. "Mein Kahin Kavi" and "Dekha Hai Teri Aankhon Mein" of Mohammed Rafi were huge hits.

#	Title	Singer(s)
1	"Dekha Hai Teri Aankhon Mein"	Mohammed Rafi
2	"Dedo Pyar Lelo Pyar"	Mohammed Rafi
3	"Tu Mera Main Teri"	Mohammed Rafi, Asha Bhosle
4	"Main Kahin Kavi Na Ban Jaoon"	Mohammed Rafi
5	"Go Go Aaagaya.....Hum Aangya Phir Dar Kaheka"	Mohammed Rafi
6	"O Sakhiyan"	Asha Bhosle
