= Janwar (1965 film) =

Jaanwar
- Directed by: Bhappi Sonie
- Screenplay by: Sachin Bhowmick
- Story by: Sachin Bhowmick
- Produced by: S. Hardeep
- Starring: Shammi Kapoor; Rajshree
- Cinematography: Taru Dutt
- Edited by: Vishnu Kumar Singh
- Music by: Shankar-Jaikishan
- Release date: 1965
- Country: India
- Language: Hindi

Janwar (transl. Animal) is a 1965 Indian Hindi-language romantic drama film directed by Bhappi Sonie and written by Sachin Bhowmick. It stars Shammi Kapoor and Rajshree in the lead roles. The music is composed by Shankar-Jaikishan and the lyrics are by Hasrat Jaipuri, Shailendra and Faiz Ahmad Faiz. It was among the highest grossers of the year and is notable for a rendition of the song "Dekho Ab To Kisi Ko Nahin Hai Khabar", set to the tune of the Beatles song "I Wanna Hold Your Hand".

== Plot ==
Mr. Srivastava lives a very wealthy lifestyle with his wife and two sons, Mahendra and Sunder. He plans to get his sons married to women from equally wealthy backgrounds. Mahendra falls in love with Seema, who is poor and lives with her stepmother. This creates considerable acrimony in the family, and Seema is not accepted as a daughter-in-law. Unable to find a solution, Mahendra takes to alcohol and falls in the bewitching clutches of a beautiful courtesan named Bahaar.

While vacationing in Srinagar, Sunder meets Sapna, who also comes from a poor family, falls in love with her and wants to marry her. She, too, falls in love with him. After the vacation, the two part company. The next time Sapna sees Sunder, he in the company of a pregnant woman and overhears that he is soon to be a father. Did Sunder decide to obey his father's instructions after all? If so, what is to become of Sapna?

== Cast ==
- Prithviraj Kapoor as Mr. Shrivastav
- Shammi Kapoor as Sundar Shrivastav
- Rajshree as Sapna
- Rehman as Mahendra Shrivastav
- Shyama as Seema Shrivastav
- Achala Sachdev as Mrs. Shrivastav
- Rajendranath as Chintu
- Asit Sen as Gyan Prasad
- Manorama as Sapna's Stepmother
- Krishan Dhawan as Servant
- Manmohan as Traffic Policeman

== Soundtrack ==
The music was composed by Shankar–Jaikishan and the songs were written by lyricists Hasrat Jaipuri, Shailendra and Faiz Ahmad Faiz.

Song	Singer	Lyrics	Raga
"Raat Yun Dil Mein Teri Khoyi Huyi Yaad Aayi..."	Mohammed Rafi and Asha Bhosle	Faiz Ahmad Faiz	
"Dekho Ab To Kisi Ko Nahin Hai Khabar..."	Mohammed Rafi and Asha Bhosle	Shailendra	
"Aankhon Aankhon Mein Kisise Baat Huyi, Yeh Dil Hi Jaane Jo Dil Ke Saath Huyi..."	Manna Dey, Lata Mangeshkar and Asha Bhosle	Shailendra	
"Laal Chhadi Maidan Khadi, Kya Khub Ladi Kya Khub Ladi..."	Mohammed Rafi	Shailendra	
"Tumse Achcha Kaun Hai, Dil O Jigar Lo Jaan Lo..."	Mohammed Rafi	Hasrat Jaipuri	
"Meri Mohabbat Jawan Rahegi..."	Mohammed Rafi	Hasrat Jaipuri	
"Mere Sang Gaa, Gunguna..."	Suman Kalyanpur	Hasrat Jaipuri	Rageshri
