= Chalta Purza =

- Directed by: Bhappi Sonie
- Written by: Sachin Bhowmick; Kader Khan (dialogue)
- Starring: Rajesh Khanna; Parveen Babi
- Cinematography: Jal Mistry
- Music by: R. D. Burman
- Release date: 24 June 1977
- Country: India
- Language: Hindi

Chalta Purza (lit. 'A Walking Skeleton') is a 1977 Bollywood action thriller film by Bhappi Sonie starring Rajesh Khanna and Parveen Babi.

== Cast ==
- Rajesh Khanna as Amar Gupta
- Parveen Babi as Sheetal
- Rakesh Roshan as Inspector Sunil Verma
- Ranjeet as Ranjeet
- Ajit as Captain Rajendra Behl
- Asrani as Shankar / Ahmed
- Jankidas as Jankidas
- Dev Kumar as Jaggi
- Murad as Samuel Antonio
- Sudhir as Inspector Sharma
- Dhumal

== Plot ==
Rajesh Khanna plays the role of Amar, an unemployed person struggling in life, just because he believes in honesty. Amar's eyes open when his mother dies in a car accident. He realizes that his mother could not be safe due to his honest ways. To improve his lifestyle, he joins the gang of the notorious criminal CAPTAIN, where he immediately becomes their favorite henchman. Things change for Amar when he learns that an old friend of his has joined the police force and has been assigned to nab CAPTAIN and his gang.

== Soundtrack ==
Song	Singer
"Baby Ghar Chalo, Ghar Tum Bin Hai Soona"	Kishore Kumar, Sushma Shrestha
"Aa Gaye Hum Dildaar Teri Gali Mein"	Kishore Kumar, Lata Mangeshkar
"Bandh Lifaafe Mein Jaise Paigham Likha Hota Hai"	Kishore Kumar, Lata Mangeshkar
"Yeh Raat Ne Rang Jamaya Hai"	Asha Bhosle
