= Bhanwar (film) =

- Directed by: Bhappi Sonie
- Written by: Gulshan Nanda
- Starring: Ashok Kumar; Randhir Kapoor; Parveen Babi
- Cinematography: Jal Mistry
- Music by: R. D. Burman
- Release date: 7 May 1976
- Country: India
- Language: Hindi

Bhanwar (translation: Cyclone) is a 1976 Bollywood film directed by Bhappi Sonie. The film stars Ashok Kumar, Randhir Kapoor and Parveen Babi.

== Cast ==
- Ashok Kumar as Dr. Verma
- Randhir Kapoor as Anup
- Parveen Babi as Roopa D'Souza
- Aruna Irani as Anju Verma
- Ranjeet as Ravi
- Madan Puri as John D'Souza "Johny"
- Kamini Kaushal as Rosy D'Souza, Roopa's Mother
- Asrani as Prabhu Singh
- Arpana Choudhary as Leela
- Nadira as Sharda, Anup's sister
- Dhumal as Chaudhary Phuliaram
- Brahm Bhardwaj as Dr. Gupta
- Sulochana Chatterjee as Sister

== Soundtrack ==
Song	Singer
"Aankhen Milayenge, Baaten Sunayenge"	Lata Mangeshkar, Kishore Kumar
"Karo Baaten, Mulaqaten, Aisi Raaten Jaagi Jaagi"	Lata Mangeshkar, Kishore Kumar
"Pehle Har Mehbooba"	Kishore Kumar
"Rang Le Aayenge, Roop Le Aayenge, Kaagaz Ke Phool"	Kishore Kumar, Asha Bhosle
"Baaraat Mein Log Kam Aaye Hain"	Kishore Kumar, Asha Bhosle, R. D. Burman
