= Jawan Mohabbat =

Jawan Muhabat
- Directed by: Bhappi Sonie
- Written by: Sachin Bhowmick
- Produced by: Hardip Chatrath; Krishna Kapoor
- Starring: Shammi Kapoor; Asha Parekh
- Music by: Shankar–Jaikishan
- Release date: 1 May 1971
- Country: India
- Language: Hindi

Jawan Muhabat is a 1971 Bollywood romance film directed by Bhappi Sonie. The film stars Shammi Kapoor, and Asha Parekh in lead roles. Filming began on 19 March 1965, and it took several years before the film was released in 1971.

== Plot ==
Dr. Sareen lives with his wife, Sunita, young daughter, Rekha, and his brother, Rajesh. Rajesh is an eligible bachelor and on the lookout for a life-partner with a view of marriage. One day, Dr. Sareen gets a visitor from his past, namely a beautiful young woman named Mala, with whom he had an affair and was even married to for a short period of time. Sareen finds out that he is still attracted to Mala, and is lured into her world – full of deception, deceit and death.

== Cast ==
- Shammi Kapoor as Rajesh Sareen
- Asha Parekh as Komal Mathur
- Balraj Sahani as Dr. Naresh Sareen
- Nirupa Roy as Mrs. Sunita Sareen
- Shashikala as Mala
- Pran as Vinod
- Raj Mehra as DIG Mathur
- Rajendra Nath as Tommy
- Sarika as Rekha

== Soundtrack ==
All songs composed by Shankar–Jaikishan and Lyrics by Hasrat Jaipuri and Rajendra Krishan

Song	Singer
"Jawan Mohabbat"	Mohammed Rafi
"Jab Mohabbat Jawan"	Mohammed Rafi
"Mere Sapnon Ki Rani"	Mohammed Rafi, Asha Bhosle
"Zulm-O-Sitam"	Mohammed Rafi
"Na Rootho, Na Rootho Meri Jaan"	Mohammed Rafi, Asha Bhosle
"Mere Sapnon Ki Rani Mujhko Mil Gayi, Mil Gayi"	Mohammed Rafi, Asha Bhosle
"In Nigahon Mein Ghar"	Asha Bhosle
"Nazar Mein Rang"	Lata Mangeshkar
