= Junior Mehmood =

Indian actor (1956–2023)

- Born: Naeem Sayyed; 15 November 1956; Bombay, Bombay State (now Mumbai, Maharashtra), India
- Died: 8 December 2023 (aged 67); Parel, Mumbai, Maharashtra, India
- Other name: Mohammed Naim
- Occupations: Actor; film director; producer; singer
- Years active: c. 1966–2023

Naeem Sayyed (15 November 1956 – 8 December 2023), known professionally as Junior Mehmood, was an Indian actor, singer, Marathi film director, and producer. The name Junior Mehmood was given to him by Mehmood Ali.

== Life and career ==
Sayyed acted in 265 films in 7 different languages and also produced and directed 6 Marathi movies. He died from stomach cancer on 8 December 2023, at the age of 67.

== Selected filmography ==
- Mohabbat Zindagi Hai (1966)
- Naunihal (1967)
- Gunehgar (1967)
- Vaasna (1968)
- Sunghursh (1968)
- Suhaag Raat (1968)
- Parivar (1968)
- Farishta (1968)
- Brahmachari (1968)
- Vishwas (1969)
- Simla Road (1969)
- Raja Saab (1969)
- Pyar Hi Pyar (1969)
- Nateeja (1969)
- Chanda Aur Bijli (1969)
- Balak (1969)
- Anjaana (1969)
- Do Raaste (1969)
- Yaadgaar (1970)
- Kati Patang (1970)
- Ghar Ghar Ki Kahani (1970)
- Bachpan (1970)
- Aan Milo Sajna (1970)
- Ustad Pedro (1971)
- Ramu Ustad (1971)
- Ladki Pasand Hai (1971)
- Johar Mehmood in Hong Kong (1971)
- Caravan (1971)
- Haathi Mere Saathi (1971)
- Chhoti Bahu (1971)
- Chingari (1971)
- Hungama (1971)
- "Khoj" (1971)
- Haré Raama Haré Krishna (1971)
- [Bhaiti]-1972 (Assamese)
- Maa Da Laadla (1973) as shotu in Punjabi movie
- Aap Ki Kasam (1974)
- Amir Garib (1974)
- Teri Meri Ik Jindri (1975) as Latoo in Punjabi Movie
- Romeo in Sikkam (1975)
- Aap Beati (1976)
- Geet Gaata Chal (1975)
- Aap To Aise Na The (1980)
- Farz Aur Pyar (1981)
- Apna Bana Lo (1982)
- Lovers (1983)
- Phulwari (1984)
- Karishma Kudrat Kaa (1985)
- Sadaa Suhagan (1986)
- Bistar (1986)
- Sasti Dulhan Mahenga Dulha (1986)
- Khel Mohabbat Ka (1986)
- Pati Paisa Aur Pyar (1987)
- Dadagiri (1987)
- Imaandaar (1987)
- Main Tere Liye (1988)
- Akhri Muqabla (1988)
- Mohabbat Ke Dushman (1988)
- Aag Ke Sholay (1988)
- Jaisi Karni Waisi Bharni (1989)
- Shehzaade (1989)
- Pyar Ka Karz (1990)
- Jawani Zindabad (1990)
- Baap Numbri Beta Dus Numbri (1990)
- Kasam Dhande Ki (1990)
- Aaj Ka Arjun (1990)
- Vasna (1991)
- Numbri Aadmi (1991)
- Khoon Ka Karz (1991)
- Karz Chukana Hai (1991)
- Ramgarh Ke Sholay (1991)
- Pyar Hua Chori Chori (1992)
- Daulat Ki Jung (1992)
- Gurudev (1993)
- Dharam Ka Insaaf (1993)
- Chauraha (1994)
- Bewafa Sanam (1995)
- Aazmayish (1995)
- Apne Dam Par (1996)
- Mafia (1996)
- Chhote Sarkar (1996)
- Judaai (1997)
- Mahaanta (1997)
- Aakhir Kaun Thi Woh (2000)
- Adla Badli (2008)
- Qatil Haseeno Ka (2001)
- Raat Ke Saudagar (2002)
- Yeh Kaisi Mohabbat (2002)
- Chalo Ishq Ladaayem (2002)
- Humein Tumse Pyar Ho Gaya Chupke Chupke (2003)
- Journey Bombay to Goa (2007)
- Jaana Pehchana (2011)
- The Rise of Sudarshan Chakra (2023)

== Television ==
- Pyaar Ka Dard Hai Meetha Meetha Pyaara Pyaara serial on Star Plus (2012–2014) as Shanky
- Ek Rishta Saajhedari ka (TV serial 2016–) on Sony SET.
- Tenali Rama TV Serial on SAB TV (2019) as Mulla Nasiruddin
