= Jal Mistry =

Indian cinematographer

- Born: 1923
- Died: April 15, 2000 (aged 76–77)
- Occupations: Cinematographer; Producer
- Years active: 1948 - 2000
- Relatives: Fali Mistry (elder brother); Shyama (sister-in-law)

Jal Mistry (1923 – 15 April 2000) was a noted Indian cinematographer who worked in Hindi cinema, best known for his collaboration with director Chetan Anand and Navketan Films, in films like Aakhri Khat (1966), Heer Raanjha (1970) and Kudrat (1981). Besides, hit films like Barsaat (1949) directed by Raj Kapoor and Naseeb (1981) by Manmohan Desai. He even co-produced Dev Anand starrer, Bombai Ka Babu (1960) with Raj Khosla.

Along with his elder brother, Fali Mistry (1917–1979), the Mistry brothers made a name for themselves in Bollywood. During the extended making of Kamal Amrohi's classic Pakeezah (1972), he also shot some of the scenes, in the absence of principal cinematographer, Josef Wirsching.

He won the Filmfare Award for Best Cinematographer four times, Baharon Ke Sapne (1967) in 1968, Heer Raanjha (1970) in 1971, Jheel Ke Us Paar (1973) in 1974, and Kudrat (1981) in 1982.

== Selected filmography ==
Year	Film	Note
1948	Anokha Pyar	
1949	Barsaat	
1950	Jan Pahchan	
1951	Sazaa	
1952	Aandhiyan	
1953	Arman	
1955	Udan Khatola	
1956	Heer	
1960	Bombai Ka Babu	Also Co-Producer
1966	Aakhri Khat	
1967	Baharon Ke Sapne	
1968	Humsaya	
1968	Kahin Aur Chal	Also Producer
1970	Heer Ranjha	
1971	Man Mandir	
1972	Bombay To Goa	
1972	Haar Jeet	
1972	Pakeezah	Shot some of the scenes after the death of its original cinematographer Josef Wirsching.
1973	Jheel Ke Us Paar	
1974	Bidaai	
1976	Bhanwar	
1977	Chalta Purza	
1981	Kudrat	
1981	Naseeb	
1982	Teri Kasam	
1986	Allah Rakha	
1987	Itihaas	
1988	Main Tere Liye	
1989	Abhimanyu	
1996	Prem Granth	
1998	Jhooth Bole Kauwa Kaate	Last film
