= List of Hindi films of 1969 =

This is a list of films produced by the Hindi film industry, released in 1969:

== Highest-grossing films ==
The highest-grossing films at the Indian box office in 1969:

Rank	Title	Gross collection
1	Aradhana	₹7 crore
2	Do Raaste	₹6.5 crore
3	Ek Phool Do Mali	₹5 crore
4	Prince	₹4 crore
5	Intaqam	₹3.5 crore
6	Jeene Ki Raah	₹3.2 crore
7	Aya Sawan Jhoom Ke	₹3 crore
8	Bandhan	₹2.8 crore
9	Jigri Dost	₹2.7 crore
10	Sajan	₹2.6 crore

== A-C ==
Title	Director	Cast	Genre	Notes
Aadmi Aur Insaan	Yash Chopra	Dharmendra, Feroz Khan, Saira Banu	Drama	
Aansoo Ban Gaye Phool	Satyen Bose	Ashok Kumar, Deb Mukherjee, Pran, Anoop Kumar, Nirupa Roy, Helen, Alka		
Anjaan Hai Koi	Babubhai Mistry	Feroz Khan, Nalini Chonkar, Aruna Irani, Helen, Tiwari, Mohan Choti	Thriller suspense	Music: Usha Khanna; Lyrics: Asad Bhopali, Usha Khanna, Manohar Khanna, Sardar Bikaneri
Anjaana	Mohan Kumar	Rajendra Kumar, Babita, Pran	Romance	Music: Laxmikant-Pyarelal
Anmol Moti	S. D. Narang	Jeetendra, Babita, Jayant, Jagdeep	Action	
Apna Khoon Apna Dushman	Kamran	Dara Singh, Mumtaz, Randhawa, Tiwari, Shyam Kumar, Sanjana, Tun Tun, Maruti, Habib, Meenaxi Shirodkar, Ulhas	Action	Music: Lala Sattar; Lyrics: Farooq Qaiser
Aradhana	Shakti Samanta	Rajesh Khanna, Sharmila Tagore, Farida Jalal, Sujeet Kumar, Ashok Kumar	Romance, drama	
Aya Sawan Jhoom Ke	Raghunath Jhalani	Dharmendra, Asha Parekh	Drama	Music: Laxmikant-Pyarelal
Badi Didi	Narendra Suri	Jeetendra, Nanda	Drama	
Balak	B. K. Adarsh	Sarika, Jaymala Adarsh, Chand Usmani, Jagdeep, Jr. Memmod	Drama	
Bandhan	Narendra Bedi	Rajesh Khanna, Mumtaz, Rupesh Kumar	Drama	
Beti	Harmesh Malhotra	Nanda, Sanjay Khan	Drama	
Bhai Bahen	A. Bhimsingh	Ashok Kumar, Sunil Dutt, Nutan, Padmini, Pran		
Bhuvan Shome	Mrinal Sen	Utpal Dutt, Suhasini Mulay	Drama	
Chanda Aur Bijli	Atma Ram	Jeevan, Sanjeev Kumar, Padmini, Sachin, Mehmood Junior	Drama	
Chirag	Raj Khosla	Sunil Dutt, Asha Parekh	Drama	

== D-J ==
Title	Director	Cast	Genre	Notes
Dharti Kahe Pukarke	Dulal Guha	Jeetendra, Sanjeev Kumar, Nanda, Kanhaiyalal, Leela Mishra	Drama	Music: Laxmikant-Pyarelal
Do Bhai	Brij Sadanah	Jeetendra, Mala Sinha, Ashok Kumar	Action drama	
Do Raaste	Raj Khosla	Rajesh Khanna, Mumtaz, Balraj Sahani, Jayant, Prem Chopra	Drama	Music: Laxmikant-Pyarelal
Doli	Adurthi Subba Rao	Rajesh Khanna, Babita	Drama	Music: Ravi
Ek Phool Do Mali	Devendra Goel	Balraj Sahni, Sanjay Khan, Sadhna	Drama	
Ek Shrimaan Ek Shrimati	Bhappi Sonie	Shashi Kapoor, Babita, Om Prakash, Rajendra Nath	Romance, comedy	
The Gold Medal	Ravikant Nagaich	Dharmendra, Jeetendra, Bindu	Spy thriller	
Gunda	Mohammed Hussain	Sujit Kumar, Master Bhagvan, Shakeela Bano, Helen	Action crime	
Gustakhi Maaf	Raj Kumar Bedi	Sanjeev Kumar, Tanuja, Sujit Kumar	Comedy	
Hum Ek Hain	Daljeet	Balraj Sani, Dara Singh, Madhumathi, Laxmi Chahya	Action drama	
Insaaf Ka Mandir	B. R. Ishaara	Prithviraj Kapoor, Sanjeev Kumar, Snehlata, Nadira, Tarun Bose	Crime drama	
Intaqam	R. K. Nayyar	Sadhna, Ashok Kumar, Rehman, Sanjay Khan	Thriller	Music: Laxmikant-Pyarelal
Ittefaq	Yash Chopra	Rajesh Khanna, Nanda, Iftekhar, Sujit Kumar, Bindu, Gajanan Jagirdar	Suspense, thriller	
Jaal Saz	Aravind Sen, Mohammed Hussain	Dara Singh, Kishore Kumar, Mala Sinha, Pran	Action	
Jahan Pyar Miley	Lekh Tandon	Shashi Kapoor, Hema Malini	Romance, comedy	
Jeene Ki Raah	L. V. Prasad	Jeetendra, Tanuja, Manmohan Krishna	Drama	Music: Laxmikant-Pyarelal
Jigri Dost	Ravikant Nagaich	Jeetendra, Mumtaz	Comedy	Music: Laxmikant-Pyarelal
Jyoti	Dulal Guha	Sanjeev Kumar, Aruna Irani, Jagdeep, Navodita	Drama	

== K-N ==
Title	Director	Cast	Genre	Notes
Khamoshi	Asit Sen	Rajesh Khanna, Waheeda Rehman, Dharmendra	Drama	
Madhavi	Chanakya	Sanjay Khan, Deepa, Pran, Padmini, Mukri, Mehmood, Roopesh Kumar, Murad, Aruna Irani		
Mahabaladu		Krishna, Vaneeshri		Telugu Dubb
Mahal	Shanker Mukherjee	Dev Anand, Asha Parekh	Mystery	
Mahua	Bibhuti Mitra	Shiv Kumar, Anjana, Aruna Irani	Musical romance	
Mera Dost	Roshan Lal Malhotra	Sheik Mukthar, Mumtaz, Aruna Irani, Mukri	Action drama	
Mera Yaar Mera Dushman	Anil Ganguly	Mumtaz	Action drama	
Meri Bhabhi	Khalid Akthar	Waheeda Rehman, Sunil Dutt, Mehammod, Aruna Irani, Kamini Kaushal.		Music: Laxmikant-Pyarelal
Mr. Murder	Nisar Ahmad Ansari	Nisar Ahmad Ansari, Nakhi Jahan, Change Usmani	Suspense	
Mujhe Seene Se Laga Lo	Datta Dharmadhikari	Ved Bushan, Uma Khosla		
Munna	Pahni Majumdar			
Nanha Farishta	K. Prakash Rao	Pran, Balraj Sahni, Padmini, Ajit	Action crime	
Nateeja	Rajesh Nanda	Vinod Khanna, Bindu, Mehmmod Jr, Ashish Kumar	Action drama	

== O-R ==
Title	Director	Cast	Genre	Notes
Oos Raat Ke Baad	Y. B. Siraj	Sanjeev Kumar, Tanuja, Madan Puri	Drama	
Paisa Ya Pyaar	Jawar Sitaraman	Biswajeet, Mala Sinha, Tanuja, Ashok Kumar	Comedy drama	
Patthar Ke Khwab	Pal Premi	Mahipal, Parveen Chowdari, Madhumati		
Prarthana	Vasant Joglekar	Abhi Bhatarcharya, Nana Palsikar,		
Prince	Lekh Tandon	Shammi Kapoor, Vyjayanthimala	Drama	
Priya	Govind Saraiya	Sanjeev Kumar, Tanuja	Drama	
Pujarin	Dhirubhai Desai	Vijay Dutt, Rehana Sultan		
Pyasi Sham	Amar Kumar	Sunil Dutt, Feroz Khan, Sharmila Tagore	Romance, thriller	
Pyar Hi Pyar	Bhappi Sonie	Dharmendra, Vyjayanthimala, Pran, Mehmood, Madan Puri, Helen, Salim Khan, Dhumal, Mehmood Jr., Sulochana Latkar	Romance	Music: Shankar Jaikishan; Lyrics: Hasrat Jaipuri
Pyar Ka Mausam	Nasir Hussain	Shashi Kapoor, Asha Parekh	Musical romance	
Pyar Ka Sapna	Hrishikesh Mukherjee	Ashok Kumar, Mala Sinha, Biswajeet, Johnny Walker	Drama	
Rahgir	Tarun Majumdar	Biswajeet, Sandhya Roy, Shashikala, Kanhaiyalal, Iftekhar, Nirupa Roy, Asit Sen, Padma, Vasant Choudhary	Romantic, social, drama	Music: Hemant Kumar; Lyrics: Gulzar
Raja Saab	Suraj Prakash	Shashi Kapoor, Nanda	Drama	Music: Kalyanji Anandji
Rakhi Rakhi	Mahesh Kaul	Rakesh Behl, Suresh Chatwal, Baskar		
Road to Sikkim	Ravindra Dave	Dev Kumar, Anju Mahendru		

== S-Z ==
Title	Director	Cast	Genre	Notes
Saat Hindustani	Khwaja Ahmad Abbas	Utpal Dutt, Madhu, Jalal Agha, Amitabh Bachchan	Historical drama	Debut appearance of Amitabh Bachchan
Sachaai	K. Shanker	Shammi Kapoor, Sanjeev Kumar, Babita, Pran	Drama	
Sajan	Mohan Segal	Manoj Kumar, Asha Parekh, Madan Puri, Shatrughan Sinha	Drama	
Samay Bada Balwan	Sohrab Modi	Sohrab Modi, Sailesh Kumar, Shahida, Mehtab, Aruna Irani, Helen	Social drama	Music: Usha Khanna; Lyrics: D. N. Madhok
Sambandh	Ajoy Biswas	Deb Mukherjee, Pradeep Kumar, Anjana Mumtaz, Sulochana Latkar		
Sansar Leela	Bhabubhai Mistry	Dinesh Hingoo, Zeb Rehman, Arvind Pandya		
Sara Aakash	Basu Chatterjee	Rakesh Pandey, A. K. Hangal, Dina Pathak	Drama	
Satyakam	Hrishikesh Mukherjee	Dharmendra, Sanjeev Kumar	Drama	
Shart	Keval Misra	Sanjay Khan, Mumtaz, Kumud Chuggani, Rajendranath		
Shatranj	S. S. Vasan	Rajendra Kumar, Waheeda Rehman, Mehmood	Spy thriller	
Simla Road	Jugal Kishore	Hiralal, Mehmmod, Jugal Kishore		
Surya Devata	Sarad Desai	Ashish Kumar, Amrit Patel, Jeevan Dhar		
Talash	O. P. Ralhan	Rajendra Kumar, Sharmila Tagore	Drama	
Tamanna	Kolli Pratyagamat	Biswajeet, Mala Sinha, Shashikala, Nazima	Drama	
Thief of Baghdad	Shriram Bohra	Dara Singh, Nishi, Helen, B. M. Vyas		
Toofan	Radhakanth	Dara Singh, Anita, Helen		
Tumse Achha Kaun Hai	Pramod Chakravorty	Shammi Kapoor, Babita, Pran	Romance, comedy	
Vishwas	Kewal P. Kashyap	Jeetendra, Aparna Sen	Drama	Kalyanji Anandji
Wapas	Satyen Bose	Ajay Varekar, Alka		
Wardrobe	Vishnu Mathur			
Waris	Ramanna	Jeetendra, Hema Malini, Mehmood, Aruna Irani, Prem Chopra, Nazima, David, Kamini Kaushal, Sudesh Kumar, Sunder, Sachin Pilgaonkar	Family romance action	Music: R. D. Burman; Lyrics: Rajendra Krishan
Yakeen	Brij Sadanah	Dharmendra, Sharmila Tagore	Drama	
