= List of Hindi films of 1966 =

This is a list of films produced by the Bollywood film industry based in Mumbai in 1966.

== Highest-grossing films ==
The ten highest-grossing films at the Indian box office in 1966:

Rank	Title	Gross collection
1	Phool Aur Patthar	₹7.5 crore
2	Suraj	₹5 crore
3	Mera Saaya	₹4.5 crore
4	Teesri Manzil	₹4 crore
5	Love in Tokyo	₹3.5 crore
6	Do Badan	₹3 crore
7	Aaye Din Bahar Ke	₹2.5 crore
8	Sawan Ki Ghata	₹2 crore
9	Pyar Kiye Jaa	₹1.7 crore
10	Dus Lakh	₹1.6 crore

== A-Z ==
Title	Director	Cast	Genre	Notes
Aakhri Khat	Chetan Anand	Rajesh Khanna, Indrani Mukherjee	Drama	Music: Khayyam, Lyrics: Kaifi Azmi
Aasra	Satyen Bose	Mala Sinha, Biswajeet	Drama	Music: Laxmikant Pyarelal, Lyrics: Anand Bakshi
Aaye Din Bahar Ke	J. Om Prakash	Dharmendra, Asha Parekh, Nazima	Drama	Music: Laxmikant Pyarelal, Lyrics: Anand Bakshi
Akalmand	Roop K. Shorey	Dev Anand, I. S. Johar, Kishore Kumar, Sonia Sahni		Music: OP Nayyar, Lyrics: Aziz Kashmiri, Pyarelal Santoshi
Afsana	B. R. Chopra	Ashok Kumar, Padmini, Pradeep Kumar	Crime Drama	Music: Chitragupt, Lyrics: Majrooh Sultanpuri
Alibaba Aur 40 Chor	Homi Wadia	Sanjeev Kumar, L. Vijaylakshmi	Drama	Music: Usha Khanna
Amrapali	Lekh Tandon	Sunil Dutt, Vyjayanthimala	Biopic	Indian submission for the Academy Award for Best Foreign Language Film Music: Shankar Jaikishan, Lyrics: Hasrat Jaipuri, Shailendra
Anupama	Hrishikesh Mukherjee	Dharmendra, Sharmila Tagore, Shashikala, Deven Verma	Drama	Music: Hemant Kumar, Lyrics: Kaifi Azmi
Badal	Aspi Irani	Sanjeev Kumar, L.Vijaya Lakshmi, Helen	Action	Music: Usha Khanna
Bahadur Daku	Jugal Kishore	Dara Singh, Indira, Ansari, Sardar Singh		Music: N Datta
Baharen Phir Bhi Aayengi	Shaheed Latif	Dharmendra, Mala Sinha, Tanuja, Rehman	Drama	Music: OP Nayyar
Bandar Mera Sathi	Gajanan Jargidar	Master Sanjeev, Manju, Master Sattar		
Biradari	Ram Kamlani	Shashi Kapoor, Faryal, Pran, Lalita Pawar		
Biwi Aur Makan	Hrishikesh Mukherji	Biswajeet, Kalpana, Mehmood, Shabnam	Comedy, Drama	
Budtameez	Manmohan Desai	Shammi Kapoor, Sadhana	Romance, Drama	
Chale Hain Sasural	Dharam Kumar	Master Bhagwan, Aruna Irani, Helen		
Chhota Bhai	Kolli Pratgayatma	Nutan, Rehman, Lalita Pawar	Comedy	
Daadi Maa	L. V. Prasad	Ashok Kumar, Bina Rai	Drama	
Daku Mangal Singh	Chand	Dara Singh, Mumtaz, Prithviraj Kapoor	Action	
Devar	Mohan Sehgal	Dharmendra, Sharmila Tagore, Deven Verma, Shashikala	Drama	
Dil Diya Dard Liya	Abdur Rashid Kardar	Dilip Kumar, Waheeda Rehman	Drama	
Dil Ne Phir Yaad Kiya	C. L. Rawal	Dharmendra, Nutan		
Dillagi	S. Bannerjee	Mala Sinha, Sanjay Khan	Drama	
Dus Lakh	Devendra Goel	Sanjay, Babita, Om Prakash	Comedy	
Do Badan	Raj Khosla	Manoj Kumar, Asha Parekh, Pran	Drama	
Do Dilon Ki Dastaan	Pradeep Kumar	Pradeep Kumar, Vyjayanthimala, Shashikala		
Gaban	Hrishikesh Mukherjee	Sunil Dutt, Sadhana	Social	Based on Munshi Premchand's novel Gaban
Gogola				
Hum Kahan Ja Rahe Hain	Nitin Bose	Prakash, Jamuna, Asrani, Neena	Drama	
Husn Aur Ishq	Naresh Kumar	Sanjeev Kumar, L. Vijayalakshmi, Indira Billi, Indira Bansal		alias Alif Laila
Husn Ka Ghulam	Kedar Kapoor	Nishi Kohli, Dara Singh, Krishna Kumari Madhumati		
Insaaf	Sadhakanth	Dara Singh, Prithviraj Kapoor, Azad, Praveen Chowdhury, Helen, Lalita Pawar, Tun Tun, Kammo, Johnny Whisky, Tiger Joginder Singh	Action	
Jawan Mard	Ishwarlal	Dara Singh, Mumtaz, Aruna Irani	Action, Adventure	
Johar in Kashmir	I. S. Johar	Mumtaz Begum, Rajan Haksar, I. S. Johar		Music: Kalyanji Anandji
Laadla	Krishnan–Panju	Balraj Sahni, Nirupa Roy, Pandari Bai	Drama	
Lal Bangla	Jugal Kishore	Prithviraj Kapoor, Manohar Deepak, Sheikh Mukhtar, Sujit Kumar, Shyama, Mohan Choti, Jugal Kishore, Hiralal, Sajjan, Rajan Haksar, R.P. Kapoor		Usha Khanna
Labela	Master Bhagwan	Master Bhagwan, Bela Bose, Sujit Kumar, Kum Kum, Helen	Comedy	
Ladka Ladki	Som Kaskar	Kishore Kumar, Mumtaz, Bhagwan		
Ladki Sahyadri Ki	V. Shantaram	Sandhya, Shalini Abhyankar, Vatsala Deshmukh, Kumar Dighe, Keshavrao Date, Baburao Pendharkar, Ganesh Solanki	Social Drama	Music: Vasant Desai, Lyrics: Bharat Vyas
Love in Tokyo	Pramod Chakravorty	Joy Mukherjee, Asha Parekh, Pran	Drama	
Love and Murder	Raja Paranjpe	Prithviraj Kapoor, Jaymala Adarsh, Helen, Ramesh Deo	Action, Crime	
Mamta	Asit Sen	Suchitra Sen, Ashok Kumar, Dharmendra	Drama	
Mera Saaya	Raj Khosla	Sunil Dutt, Sadhana, Prem Chopra	Thriller	
Mere Lal	Satyen Bose	Dev Kumar, Indrani Mukherjee, Mala Sinha	Drama	
Mohabbat Zindagi Hai	Jagdish Nirula	Dharmendra, Rajshree, Mehmood		
Nai Umar Ki Nai Fasal	R. Chandra	Tanuja, Rajeev	College Drama	
Neend Hamari Khwab Tumhare	Shiv Sahni	Shashi Kapoor, Nanda, Balraj Sahni, Shashikala, Nirupa Roy, Om Prakash, Manorama		
Pati Patni	S. A. Akbar	Sanjeev Kumar, Nanda, Mumtaz		
Phool Aur Patthar	O. P. Ralhan	Meena Kumari, Dharmendra	Drama	
Pinjre Ke Panchhi	M. C. Ananthraj	Meena Kumari, Balraj Sahni, Mehmood	Drama	
Preet Na Jane Reet	S. Bannerjee	Shammi Kapoor, B. Saroja Devi, Johnny Walker	Drama	Music: Kalyanji Anandji
Pyar Kiye Jaa	C. V.. Sridhar	Kishore Kumar, Shashi Kapoor, Mehmood, Mumtaz	Romance, Comedy	Music: Laxmikant Pyarelal
Pyar Mohabbat	Shankar Mukherjee	Dev Anand, Saira Banu	Drama	Music: Shankar Jaikishan
Saaz Aur Awaaz	Subodh Mukherjee	Joy Mukherjee, Saira Banu, Mumtaz	Drama. Mystery	Musi: Naushad
Sagaai	S. D. Narang	Biswajit Chatterjee, Rajshree Shantaram	Drama	Music: Ravi
Sannata	M. Shabarwal	Anil Chatterjee, Tanuja, Raj Mehra	Mystery	
Sau Saal Baad	B. K. Dubey	Feroz Khan, Kumkum	Thriller	
Sawan Ki Ghata	Shakti Samanta	Manoj Kumar, Sharmila Tagore, Pran	Romance	
Shankar Khan	Nanabhai Bhatt	Dara Singh, Prithviraj Kapoor, Randhawa, (wrestlers) Saudagar Singh		
Shera Daku	Radhakanth	Nishi Kholi, Kum Kum, Kamran, Sardar Singh		
Smuggler	Aspi Irani	Sanjeev Kumar, Kum Kum, Helen	Action, Crime	
Spy In Goa	Dharam Kumar	Shaikh Mukhtar, Randhawa, Malika, Maruti, Sheri, Aruna Irani, Minaxi, Hercules, Amarnath, Dilip Dutt, Sujata, Helen	Action, Thriller	
Sunhera Jaal	Kedar Kapoor	Sardar Singh, Meenaxsi, Vijaya Choudhury		Music: Hansraj Behl Lyricist: Qamar Jalalabadi
Suraj	T. Prakash Rao	Rajendra Kumar, Vyjayanthimala, Ajit Khan, Mumtaz	Ruritanian Romance	Music: Shankar Jaikishan
Tarzan Aur Jadui Chirag	Bhaboobhai Bhanji	Azaad Irani, Sunita	Adventure	
Tasveer	J. B. H. Wadla	Feroz Khan, Kalpana, Edvina, Helen	Action	Music: C. Ramchandra
Teesri Kasam	Basu Bhattacharya	Raj Kapoor, Waheeda Rehman	Drama	Music: Shankar Jaikishan
Teesri Manzil	Vijay Anand	Shammi Kapoor, Asha Parekh, Prem Nath, Randhir, Helen	Thriller	Music: R. D. Burman
Thakur Jarnail Singh	Mohammed Hussain	Dara Singh, Indira, Helen	Action	
Toofan Mein Pyaar Kahan	Phani Majumdar	Ashok Kumar, Nalini Jaywan, Madhumati		Music: Chitra Gupta
Uski Kahani	Basu Bhattacharya	Tharun Gose, Anju Mahendra		Music: Kanu Roy
Yatrik				
Yeh Raat Phir Na Aayegi	Brij	Sharmila Tagore, Biswajeet, Mumtaz, Shailash Kumar	Thriller	Music: O P Nayyar
Yeh Zindagi Kitni Haseen Hai	R. K. Nayyar	Joy Mukherjee, Ashok Kumar, Saira Banu	Romance, Drama	Music: Ravi
Zimbo Ka Beta	John Cawas	Azaad Irani, Tabassum Govil	Action	
