= Hari Shivdasani =

Indian actor (1909–1994)

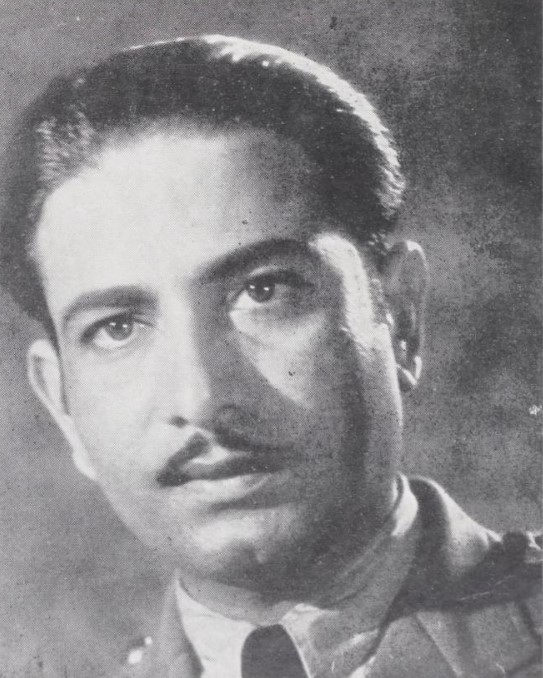
- Shivdasani 1942
- Born: 1909; Karachi, British India
- Died: 1994 (aged 84-85); Bombay, Maharashtra, India
- Occupation: Actor
- Years active: 1935–1987
- Spouse: Barbara Shivdasani
- Children: 2, including Babita
- Family: Shivdasani family

Hari Shivdasani (1909–1994) was an Indian character actor in Hindi cinema from 1930s to 1980s. Shivdasani's acting career spanned over 50 years during which he appeared in more than 70 movies.

== Personal life ==
Hari Shivdasani was a Sindhi Hindu from Karachi and had moved with his family to Mumbai at the time of the partition of the British Raj in 1947. He was married to a white British woman named Barbara, who took Shivdasani's surname upon marriage. The couple had two daughters. The eldest, Babita became an actress, and is married to actor Randhir Kapoor, and the youngest, Meena Advani, is the owner of Powermaster Engineers Private Limited and Power-master tools Private Limited. The late actress Sadhana Shivdasani was his niece. His granddaughters, and daughters of Babita, are film actresses Karishma Kapoor and Kareena Kapoor. Kareena is married to actor Saif Ali Khan.

== Filmography ==
1. Dadagiri (1987)
2. Achha Bura (1983) as Lala
3. Sun Meri Laila (1983) as Mr. Shivdasani (Ad Film Producer)
4. Sun Sajna (1982) as Owner of Hotel Tin Min
5. Yeh Vaada Raha (1982) as Mr. Pannalal Saxena
6. Harjaee (1981) as Mr. Chopra
7. Biwi-O-Biwi (1981) as Col. Hari Singh
8. Laawaris (1981) as Sethji
9. Professor Pyarelal (1981) as Rai's creditor
10. Khwab (1980) as Judge
11. Raadha Aur Seeta as Dholuram's boss
12. Jhoota Kahin Ka (1979) as Faujiram
13. Satyam Shivam Sundaram (1978) as Chief Engineer
14. Vishwanath (1978) as Raj Kishan Mehta
15. Khel Khilari Ka (1977) as I.G.P.
16. Chacha Bhatija (1977) as Pinky's Father
17. Bhanwar (1976) as Real Bridegroom's father
18. Khalifa (1976) as Shyamsunder Aswani
19. Zameer (1975) as Hari Shivdasani.
20. Khel Khel Mein (1975) as Vikram's Father
21. Sanyasi (1975) as Family Advocate
22. Ajanabee (1974) as Diwan Sardarilal
23. Insaaniyat (1974) as Poonamchand
24. Daag: A Poem of Love (1973) as Jagdish Kapoor
25. Sone Ke Hath (1973)
26. Ek Hasina Do Diwane (1972)
27. Jeet (1972)
28. Kab? Kyoon? Aur Kahan? (1970) as Police Superintendent Gupta
29. Pehchan (1970) as Ashram Manager
30. Anjaana (1969) as Advocate
31. Doli (1969) as College Director
32. Ek Shrimaan Ek Shrimati (1969) as Doctor
33. Kismat (1969) as Roma's Dad
34. Talash (1969) as Babulal
35. Tumse Achha Kaun Hai (1969) as Announcer
36. Aulad (1968) as Major Gupta
37. Haseena Maan Jayegi (1968) as Barrister
38. Jhuk Gaya Aasman (1968) as B.K.
39. Hamraaz (1967)
40. Dus Lakh (1966) as Corrupt building contractor
41. Waqt (1965) as Lala Hardiyal Rai
42. Arzoo (1965) as Major Kapoor
43. Bheegi Raat (1965) as Colonel Bhim Singh
44. Neela Aakash (1965)
45. Rajkumar (1964)
46. Ganga Ki Lahren (1964) as Seth Laxmi Das
47. Ishaara (1964) as Madan Rais
48. Sangam (1964) as Captain
49. Dil Hi To Hai (1963) as Nawab Jallaudin
50. Yeh Rastey Hain Pyar Ke (1963) as Rai Bahadur Sahni
51. Asli-Naqli (1962)
52. Anuradha (1961) as Brijeshwar Prasad Roy
53. Memdidi (1961) as Dilip's Father
54. Mr. India (1961) as Rai Bahadur Himmatchand
55. Parakh (1960) as School's Principal
56. Dil Bhi Tera Hum Bhi Tere (1960) as Memsaab's Father
57. Hum Hindustani (1960) as Diwan
58. Love in Simla (1960) as Announcer
59. Bhai Bahen (1959) as Blackmailer
60. Black Cat (1959) as Commissioner of Police
61. Chhoti Bahen (1959) as Ramesh's dad
62. Kal Hamara Hai (1959) as H. Shivdasani
63. 12 O'Clock (1958) as Hari Sivdasani
64. Ab Dilli Dur Nahin (1957) as Public Prosecutor
65. Shree 420 (1955) as Philachand
66. Marine Drive (1955) as Sunderlal Khanna
67. Badshah (1954)
68. Baghdad (1952)
69. Panchhi (1944)
70. Kisise Na Kehna (1942)
71. Ekta (1942) - the first Sindhi film
72. Hindustan Hamara (1940) as Chunilal
73. Main Hari (1940)
74. Prem Ratri (1936)
75. Sangdil Samaj (1936)
76. Sher Ka Panja (1936)
77. Bharat Ki Beti (1935)
78. Dharma Ki Devi (1935)
