= Gogola =

Gogola may refer to:

- Gogola (film), a 1966 Indian Hindi-language monster film
- Gogolá, a former enclave of Diu, Portuguese India
