= Jeet (1972 film) =

- Directed by: Adurthi Subba Rao
- Based on: Poola Rangadu (Telugu)
- Starring: Randhir Kapoor; Babita; Jeevan
- Music by: Laxmikant–Pyarelal
- Production company: Babu Movies Combine
- Release date: 1972
- Country: India
- Language: Hindi

Jeet (transl. Victory) is a 1972 Indian Hindi-language crime drama film directed and produced by Adurthi Subba Rao. It was a remake of his own 1967 Telugu film Poola Rangadu, which itself is a remake of the 1955 Bengali film Sabar Uparey , and also in turn previously got remade into Hindi as Kala Pani in 1958.

== Plot ==
Ratan (Randhir Kapoor) is an illiterate horse carriage driver, who has dedicated his life to provide for his sister, Padma (Hina Kauser) education. He meets with a gypsy girl Koyli (Babita), and falls for her. She eventually also falls in love with him. Her brother, Shankar (Roopesh Kumar) is smitten by Padma, but Ratan will not hear of him marrying his sister. Padma does finish her education with honors, and goes off to the city to attend college, there she meets with rich and wealthy Prasad (Jateen) and both fall in love. Back home, Ratan has to work day and night to order to meet with Padma's educational expenses. Prasad introduces Padma to his mom (Sulochana), who approves of her immediately. When the family attempts to finalize a marriage date, they find out about Ratan's profession, which they frown upon, but are shocked to know that her father is in prison for murder.

== Cast ==
- Randhir Kapoor as Ratan / Ramu
- Sunder as Ramu's mama
- Dulari as Ramu's mami
- Babita as Koyli / Rasili
- Jeevan as Bablu's father Dayaram
- Rajendra Nath as Bablu
- Roopesh Kumar as Koyli's brother Shankar
- Heena Kausar as Bablu's sister Padma
- as Dr. Padma's husband
- Sulochana Latkar as Doctor's mother
- Anwar Hussain as Dharamdev
- Nana Palsikar as Ramu's father Ramdas
- Hari Shivdasani as Purushottam
- as Bablu's fiancée Guddi
- Manorama as her mother
- Moolchand Kapoor

== Soundtrack ==
#	Song	Singer
1	"Bablu Miyan"	Lata Mangeshkar
2	"Sheeshi Bhari Gulab Ki"	Lata Mangeshkar
3	"Dulhan Banti Hai Naseebonwaliyan"	Lata Mangeshkar
4	"Chal Prem Nagar Jaayega"	Lata Mangeshkar, Mohammed Rafi
5	"Kisi Akeli Ladki Ko"	Lata Mangeshkar, Mohammed Rafi
6	"Ke Munde Da Main Maama Ban Gaya"	Lata Mangeshkar, Mohammed Rafi
