= Dil Daulat Duniya =

1972 Hindi film

- Directed by: Prem Narayan Arora
- Written by: Tabish Sultanpuri
- Based on: Pugree (1948); It Happened on Fifth Avenue (1947)
- Starring: Rajesh Khanna; Sadhana; Ashok Kumar; Om Prakash; Sulochana; Helen; Jagdeep
- Music by: Shankar Jaikishan
- Release date: 1972
- Country: India
- Language: Hindi

Dil Daulat Duniya (transl. Love, Wealth and the World) is a 1972 Hindi-language comedy-drama film, directed by Prem Narayan Arora and starring Rajesh Khanna, Sadhana, Ashok Kumar, Om Prakash, Sulochana, Helen and Jagdeep. The film revolves around a poor man in a palatial house who allows other newcomers in city of Mumbai to stay in his house as he feels pity on them. The music was scored by Shankar Jaikishan and songs are sung by Kishore Kumar for Rajesh Khanna. This movie was accepted by Khanna, only because he wanted to pay tribute to the acting talents of his seniors Ashok Kumar and Om Prakash, as his name would ensure that distributors would sell the film and it would reach a larger audience. The newspaper "The Hindu", in its review said "Ashok Kumar and Om Prakash are the soul of the movie and dominate the show with their acting dexterity." The film fetched 1.5 crores at the box office. As of 2012, this was among the top 10 searched movies of Khanna online.

The film is remake of the 1954 Bengali film Sadanander Mela, and also borrows plot-points from 1948 Hindi film Pugree, starring Kamani Kaushal, which was produced by Prem Narayan Arora and the same producer decided to direct the remake in 1972. Prem Narayan Arora, is the first husband of actress Helen and he directed this film for Helen to reprise the role performed by Sasikala in the original movie. The plot of the 1948 film Pugree was borrowed from the classic 1947 Hollywood hit It Happened on Fifth Avenue.

== Cast ==
- Ashok Kumar as Sheth Kalidas / Kalluram 'Kalwa'
- Sadhana as Roopa
- Rajesh Khanna as Vijay
- Helen as Rita
- Om Prakash as Udharchand Shikarpuri
- Sulochana Latkar as Mrs. Rani Kalidas / Mishrain / Bawarchan
- Jagdeep as Kanhaiya 'Kunnu'
- Agha as Raju
- Bela Bose as Kiran
- Ram Avtar as Hari
- Keshav Rana as Veterinarian
- Tun Tun as Baby's Mother
- Indira Bansal as Baby
- Polson as Havaldar

== Soundtrack ==
#	Title	Singer(s)
1	"Saath Mein Pyara Saathi Hai"	Kishore Kumar
2	"Ruk Meri Rani"	Kishore Kumar
3	"O Meri Lara Loo"	Kishore Kumar, Asha Bhosle
4	"Masti Aur Jawani Ho"	Kishore Kumar, Asha Bhosle, Sharda
5	"Deep Jale Dekho"	Asha Bhosle, Usha Khanna, Rekha Jayker

== See also ==
- It Happened on Fifth Avenue
