= Raaz (1967 film) =

- Directed by: Ravindra Dave
- Written by: C. J. Pavri
- Produced by: G. P. Sippy
- Starring: Rajesh Khanna; Babita
- Cinematography: K Vaikunth
- Edited by: M. S. Shinde
- Music by: Kalyanji Anandji
- Production company: Sippy Films
- Distributed by: Dosani Films
- Release date: 5 May 1967
- Country: India
- Language: Hindi

Raaz (lit. 'Secret') is a 1967 Hindi romantic thriller film directed by Ravindra Dave. Produced by G. P. Sippy for Sippy Films, the story was written by C. J. Pavri. The film stars Rajesh Khanna, Babita, I. S. Johar, D.K. Sapru, Kamal Kapoor and Asit Sen. The film's music is by Kalyanji Anandji.

This was meant to be the debut film for both Rajesh Khanna and Babita but due to delays, was released a year after their debuted in other films. Khanna's performance in this film was critically appreciated.

== Plot ==
Kumar (Rajesh Khanna), though of Indian origin, lives in Africa. He has recurring dreams of a Railway Station in India called "Viran Nagar". He decides to find for himself and travels to India along with his friend, Rocky (I.S Johar). They are able to find Viran Nagar railway station, which is exactly as Kumar had dreamed of. When they go to find a ride, the locals shy away from them as behave as though they have seen a ghost. They find temporary accommodations and set out to discover the mystery behind Kumar's dreams. Then a young woman, Sapna (Babita), meets with Kumar, tells him that she has been awaiting his return, and now they can be together again. But Kumar has never been to this place before, and ends up even more confused. Then another local villager named Bansi tells them he had himself seen Kumar getting killed and buried in the nearby forest. Kumar and Rocky must now find out who was killed, and why the villagers believe that Kumar has returned from the grave.

Kumar finds out the truth from a mysterious man (Kamal Kapoor) that the man who was killed was actually Kumar's twin brother Sunil. The killer was Sapna's evil uncle Sarkar Nath (D.K. Sapru) who was against Kumar and Sapna's love and hence planned to kill Kumar. Kumar was attacked by Sarkar's henchmen and lost consciousness. At the same time, Sunil and his friend arrived in Viran Nagar and found Kumar unconscious. Sunil went to find help but was mistaken for Kumar and killed and buried in the forest. As a result of his head injury from the attack of Sarkar's men, Kumar had lost his memory. Thus he began to have the recurring dreams when he returned to Africa.

In the end Kumar identifies the villains, fights and defeats them. Kumar and Sapna live happily ever after.

== Cast ==
- Rajesh Khanna as Kumar / Sunil (Double Role)
- Babita as Sapna
- Ratnamala as Paro, Sapna's mother
- I. S. Johar as Rocky
- D.K. Sapru as Sarkar Nath
- Laxmi Chhaya as Bela
- Kamal Kapoor as Sunil's friend
- Harindranath Chattopadhyay as Baba
- Asit Sen as Bansi
- Meena T as Indu
- Rahul as Thakur Singh, stone mine supervisor
- Harbans Darshan M. Arora as Doctor
- Pandari Bai as Babita's house maid
- Narmada Shankar as Diwanji

== Soundtrack ==
| # | Title | Singer(s) |
|---|---|---|
| 1 | "Akele Hain Chale Aao" | Mohammed Rafi |
| 2 | "Akele Hai Chale Aao" | Lata Mangeshkar |
| 3 | "Aeji Zara Sunna" | Lata Mangeshkar |
| 4 | "Dil Sambhale Sambhalta Nahin" | Mukesh, Lata Mangeshkar |
| 5 | "Pyar Ne Di Sada Tumko" | Krishna Kalle |
| 6 | "Sochta Hoon Ke Maine Tumhen" | Mohammed Rafi, Krishna Kalle |
| 7 | "Pyaar Kiya Toh Marna Kyun" | Manna Dey |
| 8 | "Popat Hoon Main Pyaar Ka" | Manna Dey |

== Quotes on the film ==
Rajesh Khanna said in an interview, "Though “Aakhri Khat” is my first film, I received my first break as a leading actor in Ravindra Dave's, “Raaz” in 1967. My heroine was Babita. Though I had lots of confidence, I was shy in facing the camera initially. In my first three shots, I had to perform with stress on my body language and dialogue delivery. Though I was right with my dialogues, my movements were not up to the mark. Ravindra Dave explained me my scenes and movements very clearly correcting my way of walking.Also it was based on double role and was a film much ahead of its time. There are two Rajesh Khanna."
