= Kamran =

- Gender: Male
- Language: Persian

Origin
- Origin: Persia
- Meaning: prosperous, fortunate
- Region of origin: Iran

Kamran (Persian: کامران Kāmrān) is a Persian male given name meaning 'prosperous, fortunate'. The name is commonly used in Iran and Azerbaijan, in addition to Bangladesh, Tajikistan, Afghanistan, Uzbekistan, and Pakistan. Variants include Kâmran, Kamron, and Kamuran.

== Notable people ==
=== Kamran ===
- Cumrun Vafa (born 1960), Iranian physicist
- Kamran Agayev (born 1986), Azerbaijani footballer
- Kamran Akmal (born 1982), Pakistani batsman wicketkeeper
- Kamran Atif, member of Harkat-ul Mujahideen al-Alami
- Kamran Aziz (1922–2017), Cypriot female musician, composer and pharmacist
- Kamran Bagheri Lankarani (born 1965), Iran's Minister of Health and Medical Education
- Kamran Baghirov (1933–2000), Azerbaijani politician
- Kamran Hossain Chowdhury (1952–2024), Bangladeshi politician
- Kamran Daneshjoo (born 1956), Iranian politician, minister
- Kamran Diba (born 1937), Iranian architect
- Kamran Elahian (born 1954), Iranian-American entrepreneur
- Kamran Ghadakchian (born 1947), Iranian director
- Kamran Hedayati (1949–1996), Kurdish-Iranian dissident
- Kamran Ince (born 1960), Turkish-American composer
- Kamran Khan (disambiguation), several people
- Kamran Mir Hazar (born 1976), Hazara Norwegian poet, journalist and human rights activist
- Kamran Mirza (1509–1557), the second son of Babur, the founder of the Mughal dynasty
- Kamran Mirza Nayeb es-Saltaneh (1856–1929), Persian prince of the Qajar Dynasty
- Kamran Pasha (born 1972), Hollywood screenwriter and director
- Kamran Shakhsuvarly (born 1992), Azerbaijani boxer
- Kamran Shirazi (born 1952), Iranian chess player
- Nazim Kamran Choudhury, Bangladeshi politician
- Badar Uddin Ahmed Kamran (1951–2020), Bangladeshi mayor
- Malik Nadeem Kamran (1953–2026), Pakistani politician
- Mohammed Kamran, Indian politician
- Muhammad Kamran, Pakistani politician
- Mujahid Kamran (born 1951), Pakistani theoretical physicist and academic
- Salah Uddin Kamran, Bangladeshi politician
- Talieh Kamran (1930–2017), Iranian musician, poet and visual artist

=== Kâmran ===
- Kâmran İnan (1929–2015), Turkish politician of Kurdish origin

=== Kamuran ===
- Kamuran Alî Bedirxan (1895–1978), Kurdish politician, lawyer and writer
- Kamuran Gürün (1924–2004), Turkish diplomat
- Kâmuran Şipal (1926–2019), Turkish novelist, story writer and translator
- Kamuran Toktanış (born 1974), Turkish footballer

== Fictional characters ==
- Kamran (Marvel Cinematic Universe), character from Ms. Marvel
