= Aakraman =

1975 film

- Release Poster
- Directed by: J. Om Prakash
- Written by: Sachin Bhowmick
- Produced by: Jagdsih Kumar
- Starring: Sanjeev Kumar; Ashok Kumar; Rakesh Roshan; Rekha; Mumtaz Shanti
- Cinematography: V. Babasaheb
- Edited by: Pratap Dave
- Music by: Laxmikant Pyarelal
- Release date: 1975
- Running time: 150 minutes
- Country: India
- Language: Hindi

Aakraman (lit. 'Invasion') is a 1975 Indian Hindi language war film, produced by Jagdish Kumar and directed by J. Om Prakash. The war film stars,Sanjeev Kumar, Rakesh Roshan,Ashok Kumar, Rekha, Farida Jalal, Sujit Kumar, Asrani, Keshto Mukherjee, Mumtaz Shanti and Rajesh Khanna in an extended guest appearance. The music is by Laxmikant Pyarelal. The Hindustan Times noted that Rajesh Khanna as the disabled Punjabi soldier with two emotional songs picturised on him was inspiring.

== Plot ==
This film portrays a love triangle where two army officers (Sanjeev Kumar and Rakesh Roshan) fall in love with Sheetal (Rekha). When the Indo-Pak war breaks out, all hell breaks loose and the junior officer (Rakesh Roshan) vows to take revenge on the senior officer (Sanjeev Kumar) for proposing marriage to Sheetal. But when they are posted on the frontline during the war, and the opportunity presents itself, he realises his mistake and refrains. In the end, the senior officer however gets killed by a Pakistani sentry by deceit and the national flag falls on him.

Apart from the romantic drama, the film also showcases the emotional remembrance of a father (Ashok Kumar) for his KIA son (not shown), who has died in the 1965 Indo-Pak-war and highlights the bravery and courage of Indian soldiers and airmen during the last days of the 1971 war when India defeats Pakistan and Bangladesh is created.

== Cast ==
- Sanjeev Kumar ... Major Ajay Verma
- Rakesh Roshan ... Lieutenant Sunil Mehra
- Ashok Kumar
- Rekha ... Sheetal
- Rajesh Khanna ... Karnail Singh (extended guest appearance)
- Sulochana Latkar ... Mrs. Verma (Ajay's Mother)
- Farida Jalal ... Asha
- Asrani
- Sujit Kumar ... Pratap Singh
- Keshto Mukherjee ... Rangeela
- Sunder ... Laddoo
- Ravindra Kapoor ... Subedar Usman
- Kuljeet
- Deepak Raj
- Mumtaz Shanti

== Soundtrack ==
#	Title	Singer(s)
1	"Dekho Veer Jawanon"	Kishore Kumar
2	"Chhoti Umar Mein"	Kishore Kumar
3	"Fauji Gaya Jab Gaon Mein"	Kishore Kumar
4	"Woh Ek Haseen Ladki"	Kishore Kumar
5	"Yeh Mausam Aaya Hai"	Kishore Kumar, Lata Mangeshkar
6	"Qawali Gaayenge"	Mahendra Kapoor, Asha Bhosle
