= Aurat (1967 film) =

- Directed by: S. S. Vasan; S. S. Balan
- Written by: K. S. Gopalakrishnan
- Produced by: S. S. Vasan; S. S. Balan
- Starring: Padmini; Rajesh Khanna; Nazima; Pran
- Cinematography: Kamal Ghosh
- Edited by: M Umanath
- Music by: Ravi
- Distributed by: Gemini Pictures
- Release date: 18 August 1967
- Country: India
- Language: Hindi

Aurat (lit. 'Woman') is a 1967 Indian Hindi-language film produced and directed by S. S. Balan and S. S. Vasan. It is a remake of the 1966 Tamil film Chitthi. It stars Padmini, Feroz Khan, Rajesh Khanna, Pran, Nazima, O. P. Ralhan in pivotal roles, along with Kanhaiyalal, David, Lalita Pawar, Leela Chitnis in supporting roles. The film's music is by Ravi. The film is totally revolving around the character of Parvati's life. The film deals with how Parvati (played by Padmini), who is in true love with Anand (Feroz Khan), is forced by circumstances to marry Manoharlal (Pran) against wishes of her brother Suresh (Rajesh Khanna) and later is tested by life to show whether after marriage to Manoharlal, she is truly affectionate to Manoharlal.

== Plot ==
Parvati is the elder daughter of a family with eight children who is the primary bread winner of her house. Her aim is to raise her family position and marry off all her sisters, which includes a mute girl. So she spends her whole life and toils hard to educate her brother Suresh and make him a doctor so that he can lend her a helping hand. Though she works hard, she smiles at times when she meets Anand, for whom she has a liking, but her circumstances prevent her moving further.

Manoharlal, an aged rich man and father of six children wants to marry again and has his eye on Parvati. A proposal for marriage is raised on his behalf, which Suresh and his mother do not accept, even though he is wealthy. But Parvati accepts the proposal on the grounds that her family's financial position will improve if she marries him. Suresh tries his best to dissuade her from the marriage, but she does not change her decision. Parvati marries Manoharlal and steps into his family.

Manoharlal's family members, who are against his marriage, do not welcome Parvati to their home due to stigma of the step-mother. Suresh worries about the situation of her sister in her marital home, but Parvati manages to win the love of all her step-children. Parvati spends most of the time with the children and this irritates her husband. So she behaves in the way which is liked by her husband, but not liked by herself. At times, he suspects her fidelity and assumes that she has an affair with some other man and torments her. Suresh and Manoharlal's sister Asha (Nazima) get attracted towards each other, but their union is strongly opposed by Manoharlal. He stops paying for Suresh's education, but somehow Manoharlal's sister manages pays for his studies by getting money from a man. Because of this loan, she frequently visits a hotel. Suresh passes in his final examination and this cheers Parvati.

Manoharlal arranges for a potential matrimonial alliance to visit for his sister. The man looks at her and is shocked as he has seen her frequently coming to a hotel and assumes that she is a promiscuous woman earning money. This revelation shocks Parvati and Manoharlal. But the fact is the money for Suresh's education is provided by none other than Anand. Parvati also finds that he married her mute sister Kamla. Manoharlal realises his mistake and unites his sister with Suresh and all live happily.

== Cast ==
- Padmini as Parvati
- Feroz Khan as Anand
- Rajesh Khanna as Suresh
- Pran as Manoharlal
- Nazima as Asha
- Leela Chitnis as Parvati's Mother
- O. P. Ralhan as Ratanlal
- Lalita Pawar as Manoharilal & Ratanlal's Mother
- Mohan Choti as Gopal
- Achala Sachdev as Parvati's Employee
- Nana Palsikar as Parvati's Moneylender
- David as Ratanlal's Moneylender
- Kanhaiyalal as Pandit
- Niranjan Sharma as Dinanath
- Baby Rani

== Production ==
Aurat is a remake of the Tamil film Chitthi (1966). Padmini, who played the titular stepmother in that film, reprised her role in this film.

== Soundtrack ==
All songs were written by Shakeel Badayuni.

Song	Singer
"Nari Jeevan Jhule Ki Tarah"	Lata Mangeshkar
"Nindiya Ki Nagri Se Pariyan"	Lata Mangeshkar
"Meri Gaadi Udan Khatola"	Mohammed Rafi
"Shola Ulfat Ka Bhadkake, Apne Dil Mein Aag Lagake"	Mohammed Rafi, Asha Bhosle
"Yeh Kaun Hai, Jiske Aane Se Suraj Ki Kiran Sharmaye"	Mahendra Kapoor, Asha Bhosle
"Hamen Tumse Mohabbat"	Asha Bhosle
