= Albeli (1974 film) =

1974 film

- Directed by: R. C. Talwar
- Written by: J. S. Casshyap
- Produced by: Talwar Productions
- Starring: Vinod Mehra; Rehana Sultan; Nazima
- Cinematography: G. K. Mehta
- Music by: Kalyanji-Anandji
- Release date: 25 November 1974
- Country: India
- Language: Hindi

Albeli is a Bollywood film. It was released in 1974. The film was directed by R. C. Talwar for Talwar Productions. It starred Vinod Mehra, Rehana Sultan, Nazima, Sujit Kumar, Mehmood. The music was composed by Kalyanji-Anandji.

== Cast ==
- Vinod Mehra as Vikas Chandra Verma
- Rehana Sultan as Chameli
- Nazima as Kamla
- Sujit Kumar as Thakur
- Mehmood

== Soundtrack ==
Song	Singer	Lyrics
"Tanik Tum Hamri Nazar Pehchano"	Suman Kalyanpur, Kanchan	Prabha Thakur
"Baar Baar Mera Pyar"	Nazima, Mukesh	
"Ka Kari, Ka Kari"	Manna Dey, Asha Bhosle	
"Maina O Maina"	Lata Mangeshkar	
