= Nazima =

Indian actress (1948–2025)

- Born: Mehr-un-Nissa; 25 March 1948; Nasik, Bombay Province, India
- Died: 11 August 2025 (aged 77)
- Other names: Baby Chand (as a child artist); Resident Sister of Bollywood
- Occupation: Actress
- Years active: 1954–1975

Nazima (née Mehr-un-Nissa; 25 March 1948 – 11 August 2025) was an Indian Bollywood actress who was most famous for her roles as a supporting actress in films in the 1960s and early 1970s. She was born in Nashik (Maharashtra) and was known as the "Resident Sister" of Bollywood.

== Life and career ==
Nazima was born as Mehr-un-Nisa on 25 March 1948 in Nasik, Bombay Province, India. She was related to actresses Sharifa Bai (of the 1930s) and Husn Bano (of the 1940s) who happened to be her grandmother and aunt respectively. She was admitted to a high school in Mumbai (then Bombay) and being from a film background, she was soon cast as a child artist by the name Baby Chand in her early films.

Then came April Fool (1964) directed by Subodh Mukherjee which was appreciated by millions. She then acted in J. Om Prakash's Aaye Din Bahar Ke (1968), which celebrated the silver jubilee in many places. She also acted in Gemini's Aurat (1967), another box-office hit. In between she acted in Vidyapati (1964) as the heroine opposite veteran Bharat Bhushan. This was a Hindi picture made in Calcutta. In a 1968 interview, Nazima said that to her it was the best role of her film career containing all facets — humour, romance and emotion. However, the picture failed at the box office. She also acted in another Hindi film, Wohi Ladki (1967), produced in Calcutta opposite a newcomer Sharvendra as a hero.

She was nominated in the Filmfare Best Supporting Actress Category for playing Manoj Kumar's sister in the 1972 film Beimaan. Songs picturised on her include "Ae Kash Kisi Deewane Ko" from Aaye Din Bahar Ke, "Shola ulfat ka bhadka ke" from Aurat and "Hum behanon ke Liye" from the 1969 film Anjaana.

Nazima died on 11 August 2025, at the age of 77.

== Filmography ==
Year	Film	Character/Role
1953	Patita	as Baby Chand
1954	Biraj Bahu	as Baby Chand
1955	Devdas	as Baby Chand
1955	Garam Coat	as Baby Chand
1956	Dayar-e-Habib	
1957	Ab Dilli Door Nahin	
1957	Hum Panchhi Ek Daal Ke	
1958	Princess Saaba	Debut as a heroine Stunt Film
1961	Oomar Qaid	Neela
1962	Tower House	
1964	Ziddi	Seema Singh
1964	Gazal	Kausar Ara Begum
1964	Fariyad	
1964	April Fool	Anu
1965	Nishan	Padma
1965	Arzoo	Sarla
1966	Dillagi	Lajwanti
1966	Aaye Din Bahar Ke	Rachna
1967	Aurat	Asha
1968	Raja Aur Runk	Sujata Sujjo
1969	Waris	Komal
1969	Tamanna	
1969	Doli	Shobha
1969	Anjaana	Munni
1970	Abhinetri	Ratna
1971	Adhikar	Radha
1971	Yaar Mera	Gullo
1972	Rakhi Aur Hathkadi	Shobhana
1972	Mere Bhaiya	Luxmi
1972	Do Yaar	Shanu
1972	Be-Imaan	Meena
1973	Honeymoon	Neelu
1973	Manchali	Pushpa
1973	Alam Ara	
1974	Albeli	
1974	Ujala Hi Ujala	Gita
1974	Amir Garib	Anju
1975	Sanyasi	Aarti
1975	Dayar-e-Madina	Main lead
1975	Ranga Khush	Devi
1975	Badnaam	Meena
1975	Naatak	Uma
1976	Fauji	
1977	Mera Vachan Geeta Ki Kasam	Muniya
1986	Love And God	Starting production in 1963 released in 1986
1987	Khooni Darinda	

== Awards and nominations ==
- 1965 – Bengal Film Journalists Association Awards - Best Supporting Actress (Hindi), Arzoo (1965)
- 1972 – Filmfare nomination as Best Supporting Actress for Beimaan
