= Qatl =

- Directed by: R.K. Nayyar
- Written by: JP Chouksey
- Screenplay by: Vinod Ratan
- Produced by: R.K. Nayyar
- Starring: Sanjeev Kumar; Marc Zuber; Sarika; Ranjeeta Kaur; Shatrughan Sinha; Ashok Kumar
- Cinematography: Pratap Sinha
- Edited by: Waman Bhonsle; Gurudutt Shirali
- Music by: Laxmikant–Pyarelal
- Production companies: Ram H Advani/Bunbury Investments; Filmistan; Esel Studios
- Release date: 24 January 1986
- Running time: 141 minutes
- Country: India
- Language: Hindi
- Budget: INR 50 Million

Qatl is a 1986 Indian mystery thriller film directed by R.K. Nayyar and starring Sanjeev Kumar, Shatrughan Sinha, Marc Zuber, Ranjeeta Kaur, Sarika, and Ashok Kumar. The film was released two months after Sanjeev Kumar's death and was the first of his several posthumous releases. It has been adapted from an American TV movie In Broad Daylight (1971), directed by Robert Day. The movie was remade in Kannada in 2008 as Sanchu.

It was the final feature length film that Nayyar directed.

== Plot ==
Rohini is an aspiring actor who is caught shoplifting in a shopping complex. Ranjeet, who was watching Rohini, comes to her rescue by pretending to be her partner and they both leave the venue together. Rohini tells Ranjeet of her deep hunger to be an actress while struggling to make ends meet. He offers to make her an actress as he owns a theater and produces shows, at the same time making advances towards her. Rohini accepts and returns his sexual advances for a lead role. The director of an upcoming play berates Rohini, who catches the attention of another actor-director Rakesh. Rakesh helps Rohini pick up the nuances of acting and she turns into a fantastic performer. They fall in love and get married, however, a freak stage accident injures Rakesh, who while trying to protect Rohini loses his eyesight. While in the hospital, Rakesh undergoes therapy to come to terms with his blindness and a nurse, Sita, helps him learn to read braille and move around using a stick. Despite his efforts to lead a normal life, Rakesh becomes depressed due to his condition and dislikes people taking pity on him, ultimately taking refuge in the love and dedication towards him of his wife, who has quit theatre to take care of her blind husband.

It turns out that Rohini has been having an affair with Ranjeet and plots to be back on stage to continue the affair. She manipulates Rakesh to encourage her to rejoin the theater and requests Ranjeet to provide roles for her. To support Rakesh while she is away at the theatre, Rohini hires Sita to be a full-time nurse. During a rehearsal, Ranjeet mistakes Sita for Rohini but is unapologetic about his physical contact. Sita knows about the affair but chooses to keep it to herself. One day, while visiting Ranjeet's house to pick up a package, Rakesh finds out about the affair and is distraught. He swears revenge and starts planning by making himself familiar with Ranjeet's house and nearby surroundings, hailing a cab and sound-based target shooting. He purchases a voice recorder from Century Bazaar shop and fits it to his residential telephone to record all conversations made through the phone. He creates a situation where Sita leaves her job and a helper dog is purchased by Sita from Mr. Wadia for him to move around, thus proving his inability to perform daily tasks without support.

One day, after listening to a recorded conversation between Rohini and Ranjeet to meet at his apartment at 4 P.M., Rakesh leaves the house in disguise, without the dog. He finds his way to the apartment and kills Rohini using Ranjeet's revolver. Police assume Ranjeet is guilty and take him into custody. A rather sluggish and annoyingly slow inspector Shatru, who is known to crack every murder, is given the case. He believes that Rakesh is the murderer but finds it impossible to get the right evidence.

While Shatru falsely builds a case against Sita as the murderer, she confesses to protect Rakesh. Unable to let Sita take the blame for him, Rakesh confesses that he is the real murderer. Judge at the hearing finds it difficult to accept that a blind man can murder someone on his own without being noticed. Rakesh proves his crime by taking the police and the judge through each and every action on the day of the murder. While taking aim at an alarm clock to show his voice-based target shooting, he accidentally shoots dead Ranjeet, who incidentally has just entered his house with a new girl. Rakesh is punished for the murder of his wife and imprisoned for seven years but is found not guilty of killing Ranjeet. Rakesh is released early from prison due to his good behavior and the movie ends with his going home with Sita to start a new life and Inspector Shatru seeing them off.

An old fakir is seen singing a specific song throughout the movie. He has no dialogues or involvement elsewhere but his position on the roadside is critical to Rakesh's sense of hearing and the plot.

== Cast ==
- Sanjeev Kumar as Rakesh
- Shatrughan Sinha as Inspector Shatru
- Ranjeeta Kaur as Sita
- Sarika as Rohini
- Marc Zuber as Ranjeet
- Dinesh Hingoo as Wadia
- Jankidas as Keshav Rana (Umbrella store owner)
- Keshav Rana as Zafar Ali
- Saeed Jaffrey as Judge (Special appearance)
- Ameen Sayani as TV Interviewer (Special appearance)
- Ashok Kumar as the roadside singer (Special appearance)

== Production ==
The script and dialogue were written by Jaiprakash Chouksey.

== Music ==
The music is composed by Laxmikant Pyarelal and the songs have been penned by Rajinder Krishan and Anand Bakshi.

1. "Kahan Jaa Raha Tha, Kahan Aa Gaya Hu" - Kishore Kumar
2. "Kisi Ka Dil Jo Todega, Khuda Kya Usko Chhodega" - Anup Jalota
3. "Moora Roop Rang Mora Ang Ang" - Lata Mangeshkar
4. "Koi Nahi Koi Nahi" - Lata Mangeshkar
5. "Ya Allah Yeh Mohabbat" - Kavita Krishnamurthy
