= Bikhre Moti =

1971 Hindi film directed by Tapi Chanakya

- Poster
- Directed by: Tapi Chanakya
- Screenplay by: Vishwamittar Adil
- Story by: V. C. Guhanathan
- Produced by: Omi Arora
- Starring: Jeetendra; Babita
- Cinematography: V. Durga Prasad
- Edited by: Ram Rao
- Music by: Laxmikant–Pyarelal
- Production company: Gita Shree Films
- Release date: 15 October 1971
- Running time: 135 minutes
- Country: India
- Language: Hindi

Bikhre Moti (transl. Dispersed Pearls) is a 1971 Indian Hindi-language drama film, directed by Tapi Chanakya and produced by Omi Arora under the Gita Shree Films banner. It stars Jeetendra and Babita, and the music was composed by Laxmikant–Pyarelal.

== Cast ==
- Jeetendra as Anand
- Babita as Leela
- Nazir Hussain as Ram Prakash
- Tarun Bose as Jeevan
- Asit Sen as Munimji
- Sujit Kumar as Gopi
- Murad as Doctor
- C.S. Dubey as Gopi's mentor
- Hari Sbivdasani as CBI officer
- Yusuf Khan
- Helen as Dancer
- Kamini Kaushal as Sulochana
- Irshad Panjatan as Raju
- Roma as Gopis secretary
- Shabnam as Susheela

== Soundtrack ==
#	Song	Singer
1	"Jalti Rahe Teri Mamta Ki Jyoti"	Mahendra Kapoor
2	"O Zara Dekh Ke Chalna Gori"	Mohammed Rafi
3	"Yeh Jo Ladki Hai, Yeh Jo Ladka Hai"	Mohammed Rafi, Lata Mangeshkar
4	"Yeh To Mr. Bechain, Haseenon Ke Fan"	Asha Bhosle
5	"Ek Nazar Chahoon Main Halki Halki"	Asha Bhosle
