= Aas Paas =

1981 Indian film by J. Om Prakash

- Promotional poster
- Directed by: J. Om Prakash
- Produced by: Jagdish Kumar
- Starring: Dharmendra; Hema Malini
- Music by: Laxmikant–Pyarelal
- Distributed by: Shemaroo Video Pvt. Ltd
- Release date: 16 January 1981
- Country: India
- Language: Hindi

Aas Paas (transl. Close to each other) is a 1981 Indian Hindi-language romance film directed by J. Om Prakash and starring Dharmendra, Hema Malini and Prem Chopra. The music was by Laxmikant–Pyarelal. The film begins with a dedication to the late singer Mohammed Rafi, announcing that his last recorded song was for this film.

Director-producer J. Om Prakash included in Aas Paas (1981) another brief "Lucky Mascot" screen appearance of his grandson — future Hindi film superstar actor Hrithik Roshan, then age 7 — as the boy dancing in the song "Shehar Main Charcha Hai" who winks at Hema Malini and passes her a love note from Dharmendra.

== Plot ==
Arun meets Seema by accident and they are attracted to each other. But Seema has a questionable background, which creates doubts in the minds of Arun and his mother.

Arun is involved in an accident, and everyone believes that he is dead. Seema is devastated and takes to alcohol, singing and dancing in a bar, and is raped. Arun returns. Seema is overjoyed to see him but hesitant to tell him about what had occurred.

Arun takes Seema to his home and introduces her to his family, namely his mom, his sister, Priti, and his brother-in-law, Prem. Seema is stunned and shocked when she sees Prem — she recognizes him as the man who raped her. Seema must decide to keep this terrible secret to herself and marry Arun or simply disappear from his life altogether

In the end, when Seema commits suicide, but Arun lies to his family that she is still alive. In the hospital, Prem attempts strangling Seema's corpse and Arun realizes his brother-in-law's evil nature and kills him. Seema is cremated as a bride like she desired to be and Arun is arrested living on Seema's memories.

== Cast ==
- Dharmendra as Arun Choudhury
- Hema Malini as Seema
- Prem Chopra as Prem
- Nadira as Rani
- Om Prakash as Seema's father
- Nirupa Roy as Arun's mother
- Aruna Irani as Rama
- G. Asrani as Jaikishen
- Rajendra Nath as Seth Ramiklal
- Indrani Mukherjee as Priti
- Raza Murad as Master, Bandit
- Bhagwan Dada as Bandit, Associate
- Hrithik Roshan as (uncredited) boy dancing in the song "Shehar Main Charcha Hai"

== Soundtrack ==
All the songs were composed by Laxmikant–Pyarelal with lyrics penned by Anand Bakshi.

#	Title	Singer(s)
1	"Tum Jo Chale Gaye"	Kishore Kumar, Lata Mangeshkar
2	"Shaher Mein Charcha Hai (Tere Long Da Piya Lashkara)"	Mohammed Rafi, Lata Mangeshkar
3	"Bhare Bazaar Mein"	Lata Mangeshkar
4	"Main Phool Bechti Hoon"	Lata Mangeshkar
5	"Tu Kahin Aas Paas Hai Dost"	Mohammed Rafi (Last Song of his life)
6	"Ham Ko Bhi Gham Ne Mara"	Lata Mangeshkar
