= Kal Aaj Aur Kal =

- Poster
- Directed by: Randhir Kapoor
- Written by: Virendra Sinha
- Produced by: Raj Kapoor
- Starring: Prithviraj Kapoor; Raj Kapoor; Randhir Kapoor; Babita
- Cinematography: Taru Dutt
- Edited by: S. R. Kabre
- Music by: Shankar-Jaikishan
- Production company: R. K. Films
- Distributed by: Shemaroo (DVD)
- Release date: 26 November 1971
- Running time: 156 minutes
- Country: India
- Language: Hindi

Kal Aaj Aur Kal (Note: Its literal translation is "yesterday, today and tomorrow". Figuratively, it refers to 3 successive generations and how each misunderstands the other, despite everyone loving everyone else. The three generations were played by "real life" three generations.) is a 1971 Indian Hindi-language drama film produced by Raj Kapoor and directed by his son Randhir Kapoor. The film's USP is the appearance of three generations of the famous Kapoor family. The film stars Prithviraj Kapoor, Raj Kapoor, Randhir Kapoor and his wife Babita.

It was also the last Shankar-Jaikishan score in a Raj Kapoor film. This film came after the heavy debacle of Mera Naam Joker, which was the dream project of Raj Kapoor. It more than made up for his loss although it was not a success at the box office. The film marked the final film of Prithviraj Kapoor as he died the following year of the film's release.

== Plot ==
The title of the film is an allegory for the ideological conflict between three generations: Kal (meaning yesterday in Hindi, representing the past and symbolized by the grandfather), Aaj (today, the present, represented by the father), and Kal (tomorrow, the future, represented by the grandson).

Diwan Bahadur Kapoor (Prithviraj Kapoor) is the father of Ram Bahadur Kapoor (Raj Kapoor). Ram's son Rajesh (Randhir Kapoor), returns to India after completing his higher studies in London. Diwan has long planned for Rajesh to marry Rukmani, the granddaughter of his childhood friend.

However, Rajesh is in love with his girlfriend Monica "Mona" (Babita), and objects to the marriage alliance by his grandfather. Both the grandfather and the grandson stick to their guns, little realizing that Ram is the real sufferer in the clash. Ram finds himself in trouble when Diwan threatens to leave if Rajesh marries Mona and Rajesh threatens to leave if Diwan makes him marry Rukmani. Unable to decide whether he wants his father or son, Ram leaves his home, causing the grandfather and grandson blaming each other.

Ram's friend gives him an idea, where he pretends to only want to stay in a hotel and drink a lot. Rajesh and Diwan see his state and decide to pretend to have sorted their issues. The overjoyed Ram throws a party in celebration, however, he overhears his father and son talk about the ploy. Angered, he leaves the party.

Soon, Diwan falls sick. He tells Rajesh and Ram that he's happy with everything except not getting to see his grandson's wedding. The sad Rajesh decides to give up his love for his grandfather's happiness. He tells Mona the news and she accepts his decision and is ready to attend his wedding. At the wedding, he marries Laxmi but can't see Mona at all. Diwan asks him why he looks so sad and tells the bride to lift up the veil, revealing that the girl he married wasn't Laxmi but Mona instead. Diwan tells him that if he was ready to sacrifice so much for him, he must sacrifice a little bit for Rajesh. Afterwards, Rajesh scatters his grandfather's ashes and his son is born, with Ram happy at becoming a grandfather.

== Cast ==
- Prithviraj Kapoor as Diwan Bahadur Kapoor
- Raj Kapoor as Ram Kapoor
- Randhir Kapoor as Rajesh Kapoor
- Babita Kapoor as Monica "Mona"
- Achala Sachdev as Achala
- David as Munshi
- Iftekhar as Ram's Friend
- Roopesh Kumar as Sunny

== Soundtrack ==
All music was composed by Shankar–Jaikishan, in their last collaboration with R. K. Films. Three months prior to the film's release, Jaikishan died due to cirrhosis of the liver. Nonetheless, three Kishore Kumar numbers from the soundtrack became subsequent hits. These were the solo, Bhanware Ki Gunjan, and a couple duets with Asha Bhosle, Aap Yahan Aaye Kisliye and Tik Tik Tik Tik Chalti Jaye Ghadi, the latter of which is a trio with Mukesh.

Although it was recorded, the song Kisi Ke Dil Ko Sanam does not appear in the film. However, Sharda is still credited as a playback singer in the film.

#	Title	Singer(s)	Lyrics
1	"Aap Yahan Aaye Kisliye"	Kishore Kumar, Asha Bhosle	Neeraj
2	"Bhanware Ki Gunjan"	Kishore Kumar	Hasrat Jaipuri
3	"Hum Jab Honge Saatth Saal Ke"	Kishore Kumar, Asha Bhosle	Shaily Shailendra
4	"Tik Tik Tik Tik Chalti Jaye Ghadi"	Kishore Kumar, Asha Bhosle, Mukesh	Neeraj
5	"Ek Paon Chal Raha Alag Alag"	Manna Dey	Neeraj
6	"Kisi Ke Dil Ko Sanam"	Sharda	Hasrat Jaipuri
