= Sajan (1969 film) =

- Directed by: Mohan Segal
- Produced by: Mohan Segal
- Starring: Manoj Kumar; Asha Parekh; Om Prakash; Madan Puri
- Music by: Laxmikant–Pyarelal
- Release date: 1969
- Country: India
- Language: Hindi
- Box office: 2.6 crore

Sajan is a 1969 Indian Bollywood film directed by Mohan Segal. The film stars Manoj Kumar, Asha Parekh in pivotal roles. It became a hit at the box office.

The film was Shatrughan Sinha's debut in Hindi movies.

The first half of the movie was inspired by the 1951 movie Happy Go Lovely which has also inspired movies like Ghajini (2008) and Pasand Apni Apni (1983).

The second half was largely inspired by the 1937 play I Killed the Count, which inspired several film, radio and television adaptations, including a 3-episode arc from the second season of Alfred Hitchcock Presents.

== Plot ==
Ashok (Manoj Kumar) comes from a business family and lives a very wealthy lifestyle. One day, while perusing newspapers he comes across an article which claims that he is to marry a dancer named Rajni (Asha Parekh). Angered at this insinuation, he goes to confront Rajni, all ready to threaten with a lawsuit, but is instead bewitched by her beauty and innocence and ends up falling in love with her. Initially, he does not reveal his real identity, but does inform her eventually, and both are ready to take the next step, of marriage. Before that could happen, both get embroiled in the murder of Dharamdas (Madan Puri) who has been blackmailing Rajni's mother (Sulochana) for a past secret about her husband. A murder that ends up having three different killers - Ashok, Rajni and Ashok's driver Balam (Om Prakash). But all are confessing to the same murder with different versions to investigating officers Inspector Khan (Raj Mehra) and SI Inspector Tiwari (Shatrughan Sinha), who are totally perplexed knowing that each of them are trying to save the others. Finally during a court scene for the murder trial, the actual murderer confesses the crime and all three are acquitted.

== Cast ==
- Manoj Kumar as Ashok Saxena
- Asha Parekh as Rajni
- Om Prakash as Balam
- Madan Puri as Sheroo / Seth Dharamdas
- Shatrughan Sinha as Sub-Inspector Tiwari
- Raj Mehra as Inspector Khan
- Sulochana Latkar as Lajwanti
- Gajanan Jagirdar as Roopa / Guruji
- Aruna Irani as Bulbul
- Jankidas Mehra as Taraklal
- Shabnam as Bela
- Sapru as Jwalaprasad Saxena
- Murad as Judge
- Iftekhar as Lawyer
- Shammi as Aunty

== Soundtrack ==
Sajan

Soundtrack album by Laxmikant–Pyarelal
- Released: 1969
- Genre: Film soundtrack
- Language: Hindi
- Label: Angel Records

- "Ae Mere Meharban" - Lata Mangeshkar
- "Bansuri Tihari Nandlal" - Asha Bhosle
- "Resham Ki Dori" - Mohammed Rafi, Lata Mangeshkar
- "Saajan Saajan Pukaroon" (female) - Lata Mangeshkar
- "Saajan Saajan Pukaroon" - Mohammed Rafi
- "Baton Karo Raton Mein" - Lata Mangeshkar
