= Bharosa =

1963 film by K. Shankar

- Directed by: K. Shankar
- Written by: Sudarshan Babbar
- Produced by: Vasu Menon
- Starring: Guru Dutt; Asha Parekh; Mehmood
- Edited by: K. Narayanan
- Music by: Ravi
- Release date: 1963
- Country: India
- Language: Hindi

Bharosa (transl. Trust) is a 1963 Hindi drama film directed by K. Shankar. The music for the film was composed by Ravi. Rajendra Krishan penned the lyrics of the songs. Woh Dil Kahan Se Laun rendered by Lata Mangeshkar is an all-time favourite song.

== Plot ==
Raunaklal is the servant of a rich man Ramdas who has tuberculosis and believes himself to be on the point of death; he gives Raunaklal a large sum of money to look after his little son, Bansi. Raunaklal moves to a village with his wife, son and Bansi where he brings up Bansi as a menial. Bansi is simple and good-hearted, while Raunaklal's son Deepak, though sent to the city for education, pursues a rich man's daughter. Bansi falls in love with a village belle, Gomti but Raunaklal tries to put obstacles in the way of their marriage. However, in due time all ends well.

== Cast ==
- Guru Dutt as Bansi
- Asha Parekh as Gomti
- Mehmood as Platform MPPS
- Om Prakash as Laxmi Prasad
- Shivraj as Ramdas
- Nana Palsikar as Shivcharandas
- Kanhaiyalal as Raunaklal
- Sulochana Chatterjee as Laxmi
- Lalita Pawar as Dhanno
- Shubha Khote as Double Roti
- Sudesh Kumar as Deepak
- Sayee Subbulakshmi as Dancers (In The Song "Dhadka, O Dil Dhadka")

== Music ==
Song	Singer	Raga
"Woh Dil Kahan Se Laun"	Lata Mangeshkar	Pahadi
"Aaj Ki Mulaqat Bas Itni, Kar Lena Baaten Kal Chahe Jitni"	Lata Mangeshkar, Mahendra Kapoor	
"Dhadka, O Dil Dhadka, Guzra Gali Se Tere Mere"	Lata Mangeshkar, Asha Bhosle	
"Kaahe Itna Guman Chhoriye, Yeh Mela Do Din Ka"	Mohammed Rafi, Asha Bhosle	
"Kabhi Dushmani, Kabhi Dosti, Kabhi Baat Baat Pe Dillagi"	Mohammed Rafi, Asha Bhosle	
"Yeh Jhuke Jhuke Naina"	Mohammed Rafi	
"Yaaron, Yeh Jo Duniya Hai"	Mohammed Rafi	
"Is Bhari Duniya Mein Koi"	Mohammed Rafi	
