= Kamuran Toktanış =

Turkish footballer

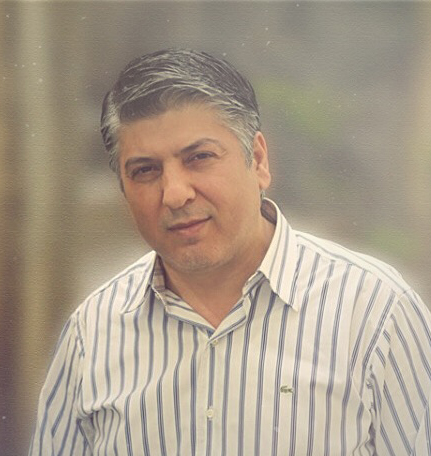

Personal information
- Full name: Kamuran Toktanış
- Place of birth: Kurtalan, Turkey
- Height: 1.71 m (5 ft 7 in)
- Position: Midfielder

Youth career
- 1994–1995: Kurtalanspor
- 1995–1996: Kurtalanspor

Senior career*
Years	Team	Apps	(Gls)
1996–1997	Kurtalanspor		
- * Club domestic league appearances and goals

Kamuran Toktanış is a Turkish business executive, and former footballer. He serves as Deputy Secretary General of the Diyarbakır Chamber of Commerce and Industry. He has worked on projects related to regional economic development and entrepreneurship through his positions at the Diyarbakır Chamber of Commerce and Industry.

== Early life and education ==
He studied at Eastern Mediterranean University (TRNC), graduating with a degree in Political Science and Public Administration.

== Career ==
Before transitioning into his corporate career, Toktanış was a professional footballer. He played as a midfielder for Kurtalanspor. His professional athletic career began in 1996 and concluded in 2001 upon the completion of his university education, in 2001 he began working in the private sector.

Toktanış has worked at the Chamber of Commerce and Industry (DTSO), where he holds the position of Assistant Secretary General. He also represents DTSO on provincial delegations, including on an environmental campaign in Geliyê Godernê. In 2015, he received a certificate for completing the Advanced Kurdish training for DTSO staff.

Toktanış served as a Business Consultant for the "Support for Traditional Handicrafts in Diyarbakır" project as part of the Cultural Heritage Development Programme of the Gap Region.

He was a part of group of members from DTSO and the Diyarbakır Commodity Exchange (DTB) that worked on Kurdistan Regional Government (KRG) Relations and the Chambers of Commerce in Erbil, Sulaymaniyah, and Duhok.

In 2018, Toktanış served as an educator for the Small and Medium Enterprises Development Organization Applied Entrepreneurship course.
