= R. K. Nayyar =

Indian director and producer

- Born: Ram Krishna Nayyar; 1930; Lahore, British India
- Died: 1995 (aged 64–65)
- Occupations: Film director, producer
- Known for: Love in Simla
- Spouse: Sadhana (m. 1966)

R. K. Nayyar (born Ram Krishna Nayyar, 1930 – 1995) was an Indian film director, producer and screenwriter in Hindi language films.

== Professional life ==
His major directorial work includes Love in Simla which released in 1960.

In India, Love in Simla was the fifth highest-grossing film of 1960. It grossed ₹1.7 crore in 1960.

In the Soviet Union, the film was released in 1963 and came third place on the year's Soviet box office chart. The film drew a Soviet box office audience of 35 million viewers, making it one of the top 20 most successful Indian films in the Soviet Union.

== Personal life ==
R. K. Nayyar married Indian actress Sadhana, first cousin of actress Babita on 7 March 1966.

== Filmography ==
=== As director ===
Year	Film
1986	Qatl
1969	Intaquam
1966	Yeh Zindagi Kitni Haseen Hai
1964	Aao Pyar Karen
1963	Yeh Rastey Hain Pyar Ke
1960	Love in Simla

=== As producer ===
Year	Film
1990	Pati Parmeshwar
1986	Qatl
1966	Yeh Zindagi Kitni Haseen Hai

=== As screenwriter ===
Year	Film
1969	Intaquam
1960	Love in Simla
