= Ek Hasina Do Diwane =

- Movie Poster
- Directed by: S. M. Abbas
- Written by: S. M. Abbas (dialogues); Anjaan; Kafeel Azar; Qamar Jalalabadi; Prakash Mehra; Namwar (lyrics)
- Screenplay by: S. M. Abbas
- Story by: K. Majeed
- Produced by: Kantibhai Zaveri
- Starring: Jeetendra; Babita; Vinod Khanna
- Cinematography: N. Satyen
- Edited by: K. H. Mayekar
- Music by: Kalyanji-Anandji
- Production company: R. G. Films
- Release date: 10 March 1972
- Country: India
- Language: Hindi

Ek Hasina Do Diwane (transl. One beautiful girl, two crazy boys) is a 1972 Hindi-language romance film, produced by Kantibhai Zaveri under the R. G. Films banner and directed by SM Abbas. It stars Jeetendra, Babita Kapoor, Vinod Khanna in pivotal roles, and the music was composed by Kalyanji-Anandji.

== Cast ==
- Jeetendra as Amar
- Babita as Neeta
- Vinod Khanna as Prakash
- Om Prakash as Neeta's Father
- Nirupa Roy as Amar's Mother
- Johnny Walker as Brahmachari
- Manmohan Krishna as Barrister

== Soundtrack ==
#	Title	Singer(s)
1	"Aaja Ya Aa Jane De Paas"	Kishore Kumar, Asha Bhosle
2	"Do Qadam Tum Bhi Chalo"	Mukesh, Lata Mangeshkar
3	"Yeh Nach Wach Kya Hai"	Mohammed Rafi
4	"Hare Rama Kaisa Aaya Zamana"	Manna Dey
5	"Prem Pujarin Maang Mein Bharke"	Asha Bhosle
6	"Do Qadam Tum Na Chale"	Mukesh
