= Aulad (1968 film) =

- Theatrical release poster
- Directed by: Kundan Kumar
- Written by: Rafi Ajmeri; Vishwanath Pande (dialogues); Majrooh Sultanpuri (lyrics)
- Screenplay by: Ranjan Bose
- Story by: Ranjan Bose
- Produced by: Kundan Kumar
- Starring: Jeetendra; Babita
- Cinematography: V. Durga Prasad
- Edited by: Kamalakar
- Music by: Chitragupta Shrivastav
- Production company: Kundan Films
- Release date: 8 November 1968
- Country: India
- Language: Hindi

Aulad (transl. children, offspring, descendants) is a 1968 Hindi-language drama film, produced and directed by Kundan Kumar under the Kundan Films banner. It stars Jeetendra, Babita with music composed by Chitragupta Shrivastav.

== Cast ==
- Jeetendra as Arun / Sohan
- Babita as Bharti
- Sujit Kumar as Dr. Mohan
- Manmohan Krishna as Zamindar Kanta Prasad Gupta
- Nazir Hussain as Dinu
- Hari Shivdasani as Major Gupta
- Mehmood as Chamanlal "Charlie" Singaporie
- Manmohan as Suraj
- Jeevan as Munim Ramlal
- Sulochana Chatterjee as Mamta
- Achala Sachdev as Sharda
- Aruna Irani as Shobha
- Helen as Courtesan

== Soundtrack ==
The music was composed by Chitragupta Shrivastav and lyrics by Majrooh Sultanpuri.

#	Song	Singer
1	"Abke Bahaar Aayi Hai Tumhare Naam Se"	Mohammed Rafi
2	"Naazuk Naazuk Badan Mora"	Mohammed Rafi, Lata Mangeshkar
3	"Arman Tha Hamen"	Mohammed Rafi, Lata Mangeshkar
4	"Kab Tak Huzoor Roothe Rahoge"	Lata Mangeshkar
5	"Dagabazi Piya Tere"	Suman Kalyanpur
6	"Jodi Hamari Jamega Kaise Jaani"	Asha Bhosle, Manna Dey
