= Yeh Zindagi Kitni Haseen Hai =

- Directed by: R. K. Nayyar
- Written by: Harish Kumar Mehra
- Produced by: R. K. Nayyar
- Starring: Joy Mukherjee; Saira Banu; Ashok Kumar
- Cinematography: K. H. Kapadia
- Edited by: D. N. Pai
- Music by: Ravi
- Production company: R. K. Nayyar Films
- Release date: 1966
- Country: India
- Language: Hindi

Yeh Zindagi Kitni Haseen Hai (transl. This Life Is Beautiful) is a 1966 Hindi-language romantic drama film directed by R. K. Nayyar. The film was produced by Nayyar fr his R. K. Nayyar Films banner. It had story and screenplay by Harish Kumar Mehra with dialogues by Agha Jani Kashmiri. The music was composed by Ravi with lyrics written by Rajendra Krishan.

The film starred Joy Mukherjee, who was cast in films where the hero was required to perform the Shammi Kapoor style of acting. Though he did not achieve Kapoor's fame and popularity, he acted in several films with good music and popular songs recorded in Mohammed Rafi's voice. Yeh Zindagi Kitni Haseen Hai is cited as one of his "major" films. Saira Banu played the lead female role, where she is shown upholding "Indian morals" by refusing to wear a swimsuit for the Miss Universe contest. Besides this film, Saira had acted in two other film in 1966, Saaz Aur Awaaz and Pyar Mohabbat. The films "failed to make an impact" for Saira as an actress that year. Co-stars included Motilal, Sayeeda Khan, Badri Prasad and Madan Kumar.

== Plot ==
Sarita, a princess is troubled by her bodyguards and tries to evade them. Not successful, she plans to run away. During one of her adventures during her flight from home, she joins a beauty contest for Miss Universe. The winner of the local contest will be sent to Paris representing India in the Miss Universe pageant. There she meets Sanjay Malhotra who is a participant in the Mr. Handsome contest. The two fall in love and continue dodging the guards sent from home to look for her. The story then has people after her for her money and Sanjay not being what he claims to be. The film ends with misunderstandings and secrets cleared and Sanjay and Sarita reuniting.

== Cast ==
- Joy Mukherjee as Sanjay Malhotra
- Saira Banu as Princess Sarita / Sarita (Double Role)
- Ashok Kumar as Mr. Gupta
- Motilal as Mr. Jolkar
- Sayeeda Khan as Olga
- Badri Prasad as Dinu
- Madan Kumar as William

== Soundtrack ==
The music was composed by Ravi with lyrics by Rajendra Krishan. The playback singing was provided by Asha Bhosle (4 Songs) and Mohammed Rafi (3 Songs).

=== Song list ===
Song	Singer
"Mohabbat Rang Layegi"	Mohammed Rafi
"Nange Baazu, Nangi Taange"	Mohammed Rafi
"Mashallah Tum Jawan Ho"	Mohammed Rafi
"Mashallah Tum Jawan Ho"	Asha Bhosle
"Jeene Ka Agar Andaz Aaye"	Asha Bhosle
"Koi Aankh Milake Dekhe"	Asha Bhosle
"Dekho Yeh Deewana"	Asha Bhosle
