= Haseena Maan Jayegi =

Hasina Maan Jayegi
- Poster
- Directed by: Prakash Mehra
- Written by: S. M. Abbas
- Starring: Shashi Kapoor; Babita; Ameeta; Johnny Walker
- Cinematography: N. Satyen
- Edited by: R. Mahadik
- Music by: Kalyanji Anandji
- Production company: Bakshi Productions
- Release date: 1968
- Country: India
- Language: Hindi
- Box office: ₹1.9 crore (equivalent to ₹107 crore or US$11 million in 2026)

Hasina Maan Jayegi (lit. 'The Beauty Will Agree') is a 1968 Hindi film directed by Prakash Mehra. The film stars Shashi Kapoor, Babita, Ameeta, Yunus Parvez and Johnny Walker. The film's music, composed by Kalyanji Anandji, has songs which are quite memorable, with the melodious Rafi-Lata duet "Bekhudi Mein Sanam" being the most popular of them all. The film stood 9th in Box office collection for the year 1968. Shooting of the film started with the song "O Dilbar Janiye" at the now defunct Roop Tara studio.

== Plot ==
Archana (Babita) moves to a new city along with her widowed father. In college, she meets Rakesh (Shashi Kapoor), son of her father's friend, who always teases her. She wants to complain about him to the principal, but by mistake she complains about Kamal (Shashi Kapoor) who looks exactly like Rakesh. Kamal was an orphan and is a very decent fellow. Later, she realizes her mistake and Kamal and Archana grow close. But Rakesh wants to marry Archana and always tries to come between them. At last, Archana takes her father's consent to marry Kamal.

Rakesh wants to kidnap Kamal and impersonate him to marry Archana. But his henchmen kidnap him thinking that he is Kamal. Archana and Kamal marry and enjoy their honeymoon at her father's estate. Soon war breaks out and Kamal has to leave for the front. To his surprise, Rakesh has also enrolled in the army in the same battalion. One day, when they both are alone, Rakesh starts fighting with Kamal and it carries on till one of them disappears underwater.

Later, the remaining one comes to Archana's estate and they live together for some time. One day Kamal's superior comes to report the death of Kamal. Archana gets confused as her husband has been with her all the time. But his superior tells her that he could recognize Kamal anywhere and says Kamal is dead. Not sure of the identity of the man who is staying with her, she puts him to some tests and concludes that he is not Kamal. But he says that he is Kamal and he came back because of the fear that he had killed Rakesh. Now he is sure that he didn't kill Rakesh as he had died in a battlefield. But no one believes him and he gets arrested. He is about to be sentenced to ten years of jail for cheating and rape, when the real Rakesh appears and testifies that he is the real Rakesh. Everything is settled, Kamal and Archana happily reconcile and forgive Rakesh for his previous misdoings. Kamal later tells Archana that he failed in his tests to prove himself as Kamal because he lived in constant fear of having killed Rakesh.

== Cast ==
- Shashi Kapoor as Kamal/Rakesh (Double Role)
- Babita as Archana
- Johnny Walker as Ghasitaram Aashiq
- Ameeta as Laali
- Manmohan Krishna as Professor
- Yunus Parvez as Laali's Father
- Sapru as Principal
- Niranjan Sharma as Mahavir (Archana's Father)

== Soundtrack ==
| # | Title | Singer(s) | Lyricist | Raga |
|---|---|---|---|---|
| 1 | "Dilbar Dilbar Kahte Kahte Hua Diwana" | Mohammed Rafi, Lata Mangeshkar | Qamar Jalalabadi | |
| 2 | "Bekhudi Mein Sanam" | Mohammed Rafi, Lata Mangeshkar | Akhtar Romani | Charukeshi |
| 3 | "O Dilbar Janiye" | Mohammed Rafi | Prakash Mehra | |
| 4 | "Chale The Saath Milkar" | Mohammed Rafi | Akhtar Romani | |
| 5 | "Mere Mehboob Mujhko Itna Bata" | Manna Dey, Asha Bhosle | Qamar Jalalabadi | |
| 6 | "Suno Suno Kanyaon Ka Varnan" | Mohammed Rafi, Mahesh Kumar | Prakash Mehra | |
