= Neend Hamari Khwab Tumhare (1966 film) =

- Directed by: Shiv Sahni
- Screenplay by: Sarshar Sailani
- Produced by: Hans Choudhary
- Starring: Shashi Kapoor; Nanda
- Cinematography: V. Ratra
- Edited by: Das Dhaimande
- Music by: Madan Mohan
- Production company: Rob Tara Studios
- Release date: 1966
- Country: India
- Language: Hindi

Neend Hamari Khwab Tumhare is a 1966 Indian Hindi-language film directed by Shiv Sahni and produced by Hans Choudhary. It stars Shashi Kapoor and Nanda in pivotal roles.

== Synopsis ==
Nishad (Nanda) lives a wealthy and noble lifestyle with her Delhi-based father, Khan Bahadur Balraj Sahni and mom. She has three suitors who would do anything to marry her. The first is Shaukat Khan Manmohan, the son of Nawab Hamid Khan, who also comes from a noble family and meets with the approval of her dad; the second is Shibbu Rajendra Nath, who is distantly related to her mom, and also meets their approval; the third is Anwar Shashi Kapoor, the only son of Nawab Azmatullah Khan Farooqui Om Prakash who was initially rejected by her parents, but is now on their approval list, as they think he, too, comes from a noble background. After a few dates, Nishad falls in love with Anwar, much to the chagrin of Shaukat and Shibbu. What Nishad does not know is that Anwar's dad was a Hajam (Barbar) by profession, and had assumed the title of 'Nawab' after winning a lottery. Watch what happens when all the truths unfolds slowly before Nishad and her parents eyes. Nishads parents find out the whole truth on the very day of her wedding to Anwar. What will happen? Will the marriage go ahead?

== Cast ==
- Shashi Kapoor as Anwar
- Nanda as Nishat
- Balraj Sahni as Khan Bahadur
- Nirupa Roy as Begum Khan Bahadur
- Om Prakash as Ajju Hajam / Nawab Ajmutullah Khan Farooqui
- Shashikala as Ms. Paul
- Rajendra Nath as Shibbu
- Manmohan as Nawab Shaukat Hamid Khan
- Manorama as Begum Ajmutullah Khan Farooqui
- Anwar Hussain as Dr. Rana
- Lotan as Mir Sahib
- Vishwa Mehra as Fazal
- Bela Bose as Dancer
- Madhumati as Dancer

== Soundtrack ==
Lyrics by: Rajendra Krishan.

Song	Singer
"Yun Rootho Na Haseena"	Mohammed Rafi
"Husn Jab Jab Ishq Se Takra Gaya"	Asha Bhosle, Mohammed Rafi
"Kabhi Tera Daman Na Chhodenge Hum"	Asha Bhosle, Mohammed Rafi
"Saqiya Ek Jaam Woh Bhi To De, Jo Teri Aankh Se Chhalakta"	Asha Bhosle, Mubarak Begum
"Bheegi Hui Is Raat Ka Aanchal"	Asha Bhosle
"Koi Shikwa Bhi Nahin"	Asha Bhosle
