= Kamran Khan =

Kamran Khan may refer to:

- Kamran Khan (politician), Pakistani politician
- Kamran Khan (journalist), Pakistani journalist
- Kamran Khan (Indian cricketer) (born 1991), Indian cricketer
- Kamran Khan (Pakistani cricketer) (born 1969), Pakistani cricketer
- Kamran Khan (Qatari cricketer) (born 1988), Qatari cricketer
- Kamran Khan (footballer) (born 1985), football player
- Kamran Khan (squash player) (born 1990), Malaysian squash player
