= Sulochana Latkar =

Indian actress (1928–2023)

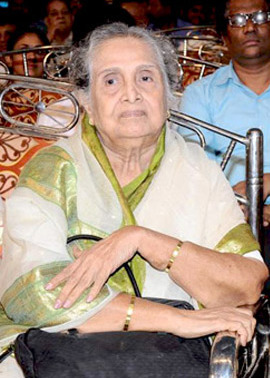
- Latkar in 2011
- Born: Rangu Diwan; 30 July 1928; Belgaum, Bombay Presidency, British India (present-day Belagavi, Karnataka, India)
- Died: 4 June 2023 (aged 94); Dadar, Mumbai, Maharashtra, India
- Occupation: Actress
- Years active: 1946–1988
- Works: Full list
- Spouse: Aabasaheb Chavan (m. 1943)
- Relatives: Kashinath Ghanekar (son-in-law)
- Honours: Maharashtra Bhushan (2009); Padma Shri (1999)

Sulochana Latkar (born Rangu Diwan; 30 July 1928 – 4 June 2023), better known by her screen name Sulochana, was an Indian actress of Marathi and Hindi cinema, who acted in 50 films in Marathi and around 250 films in Hindi. She received accolades throughout her career. In 1997, the V. Shantaram Lifetime Achievement Award was bestowed on her by the Government of Maharashtra. She has been honoured by the Government of India with Padma Shri for her contribution in the field of Arts. In 2009, she received the Maharashtra Bhushan, the highest civilian honour in the Indian state of Maharashtra. She epitomized the "mother" roles from 1959 until the early 1990s.

She was most known for her performances in Marathi films such as Sasurvas (1946), Meeth Bhakar (1949), Vahinichya Bangdya (1953), Dhakti Jaoo (1958) and Sangtye Aika (1959) in the lead roles, as well as for the mother roles she played in Hindi cinema right from 1959 film Dil Deke Dekho to the year 1995.

== Early life ==
Sulochana was born as Rangu Shankarrao Diwan on 30 July 1928 on the day of Naga Panchami in the village of Khadkalat, located in the Belagavi district of Karnataka. She was the daughter of Shankarrao Diwan, a police officer, and Tanubai. Following the untimely death of her parents, she was raised by her maternal aunt, Banubai Latkar. Her formal education was limited to the fourth grade.

During her youth in Kolhapur, she developed a keen interest in cinema. Through a family acquaintance, she secured a position at Master Vinayak’s Prafulla Pictures with a monthly salary of thirty rupees. She made her entry into the film industry with the film Chimukla Sansar in 1943, appearing in a scene alongside actor Raja Gosavi. During this period, she built professional relationships with several prominent figures, including Lata Mangeshkar, G. D. Madgulkar, and Raja Gosavi. During her initial struggles with language and dialect, she received moral support from Lata Mangeshkar, with whom she maintained a long-standing friendship.

Latkar married Aabasaheb Chavan at a young age. Her husband, who was acquainted with filmmaker Bhalji Pendharkar, encouraged her acting career and facilitated her introduction to Pendharkar's Jayprabha Studio. She was appointed as a junior artist at the studio on a monthly salary of fifty rupees. Pendharkar cast her in the 1943 Hindi film Maharathi Karna, which featured Prithviraj Kapoor and Durga Khote in lead roles. It was during this phase of her career that Pendharkar renamed her "Sulochana," a name she subsequently adopted professionally. She regarded Pendharkar as her lifelong mentor, and following her performance in Maharathi Karna, he created a specific role for her in the film Sasurvas.

== Career ==
=== Early career and debut ===
Sulochana made her screen debut with the Marathi film Chimukla Sansar (1943), in which she appeared in the title role. During this period, she also appeared in Hindi films, including Marvi (1942), Shankar Parvati (1943), Vishkanya (1943), Kaliyan (1944), Rangile Dost (1944) and Samrat Chandragupta (1945). Her Marathi film Sasurvaas (1946) marked an important early appearance in her career.

She continued appearing in Hindi films such as Doli, Geet Govind, Khandani, Mera Suhag and Pahla Pyar (1947), followed by Nai Reet and Refugee (1948). In Marathi cinema, she received her first leading role in Jeevacha Sakha (1948), portraying Chandra Deshmukh. She subsequently appeared in Paras and Meeth Bhakar (1949), further establishing her position as a leading actress in Marathi films.

=== Establishing herself as an actress ===
During this period, She appeared in several Marathi and Hindi productions. Her Marathi films included Dev Pavala and Bala Jo Jo Re (1950), Shiva Ramoshi and Stree Janma Tuzi Hi Kahani (1951), and Chimani Pakhare and Chhatrapati Shivaji (1952), in which she portrayed Saibai. In Hindi cinema, she appeared in Apni Chhaya, Bahu Rani and Sati Narmada (1950), among other films, followed by Actor, Badi Bahu and Ghayal (1951). She also appeared in Anarkali and Baaz (1953). Her performance in the Marathi film Vahininchya Bangdya (1953), in which she played the title character Vahini, became one of her notable performances.

She continued working in both film industries, appearing in Hindi films such as Gawaiya, Mahatma Kabir, Nagin, Shart and Suhagan (1954), followed by Bindiya, Ekadashi and Pati Pawan (1955). Her Marathi film appearances included Mahatma Phule (1954), in which she portrayed Savitribai Phule, Bhaubeej (1955) and Sati Anusaya (1956). She also appeared in Hindi films such as Jagte Raho (1956), Ab Dilli Dur Nahin and Musafir (1957). In 1958, she appeared in the Marathi film Sukhache Sobti, playing Geeta, alongside Hindi films including Allaudin Ka Chirag and Gauri Shankar.

This period marked an important transition in her career as she began gaining recognition in Hindi cinema while continuing to work in Marathi films. She appeared in the Marathi films Sati Vaishalini and Sangtye Aika (1959), the latter featuring her as Hansa. In Hindi cinema, she appeared in Dil Deke Dekho, Do Ustad and Sujata (1959). Her performance in Sujata, directed by Bimal Roy, brought her recognition for portraying a mature female character. She subsequently appeared in Jis Desh Mein Ganga Behti Hai, Dil Apna Aur Preet Parai and Mohabbat Ki Jeet (1960). In 1961, she appeared in Hindi films including Bhabhi Ki Chudiyan, Jab Pyar Kisi Se Hota Hai and Memdidi. She also starred in the Marathi film Prapanch (1961), portraying Paru Kumbhar, for which she received the Maharashtra State Film Award for Best Actress.

=== Recognition in Hindi cinema ===
She increasingly appeared in supporting and mature roles in Hindi cinema, alongside her continued work in Marathi films. Her Hindi credits during this period included Jhoola, Meri Behen and Shola Aur Shabnam (1962), Bandini and Bharosa (1963), and Pooja Ke Phool, Sharabi and Ziddi (1964). In Marathi cinema, she appeared in Molkarin and Chhota Jawan (1963), portraying Radha and Aai respectively, followed by Maratha Tituka Melvava (1964), in which she portrayed Jijabai. Her other Marathi films included Vavtal, Sadhi Mansa and Laxmi Aali Ghara (1965).

During these years, Sulochana became a familiar face in Hindi cinema, frequently portraying the mothers and close relatives of leading male actors. She appeared in Chhota Bhai, Devar and Pyar Mohabbat (1966), followed by Nai Roshni, Baharon Ke Sapne and Raat Aur Din (1967). Her Hindi films in 1968 included Aadmi, Aulad, Sunghursh and Saraswatichandra. She also appeared in Ek Shriman Ek Shrimati, Chirag, Bhai Bahen and Aya Sawan Jhoom Ke (1969). In Marathi cinema, she continued to take on significant roles in films such as Sant Gora Kumbhar (1967), Khandobachi Aan, Ekati and Gharchi Rani (1968), and Manaacha Mujra (1969).

=== Transition into character roles ===
Sulochana continued her association with leading Hindi film actors, particularly Dev Anand, Sunil Dutt and Rajesh Khanna. Her films during this period included Johny Mera Naam, Devi and Pehchan (1970), followed by Kati Patang, Reshma Aur Shera and Sharmeelee (1971). In 1972, she appeared in Be-Imaan, Piya Ka Ghar and Mere Jeevan Saathi. Her subsequent Hindi films included Joshila and Kahani Kismat Ki (1973), and Aap Ki Kasam, Kora Kagaz, Majboor and Roti Kapada Aur Makaan (1974). She also continued her Marathi film career with Mai Maauli (1971) and Varhadi Aani Vajantri (1973).

She appeared in Hindi films such as Aakraman, Dharmatma, Faraar and Warrant (1975), followed by Nagin and Khaan Dost (1976). Her subsequent appearances included Aashiq Hoon Baharon Ka (1977) and Muqaddar Ka Sikandar (1978), in which she portrayed the mother of Vinod Khanna's character. In Marathi cinema, she appeared in Preet Tujhi Majhi and Pandoba Porgi Phasali (1975), Pudhari (1976) and Bhala Manus (1979).

=== Prominence as a mother in Hindi cinema ===
During the 1980s, she continued portraying mothers and other senior family members in Hindi films. Her Hindi appearances included Dostana (1980), Yaarana and Krodhi (1981), Jeevan Dhaara (1982), Himmatwala and Phulwari (1983), and Andar Baahar, Divorce and Raj Tilak (1984). She subsequently appeared in Ghulami (1985), Ghar Sansar and Kala Dhanda Goray Log (1986). Her Marathi films during this period included Savli Premachi (1980), Soon Mazi Laxmi and Satichi Punyayee (1981), Laxmichi Paule, Ek Daav Bhutacha and Bhannat Bhanu (1982), Kashala Udyachi Baat (1983), Sasu Varchadh Jawai (1984) and Bijli (1986).

She appeared in Khoon Bhari Maang (1988), portraying the mother of J.D. In the following years, she made fewer film appearances. Her later Hindi film credits included Pyar Pyar (1993), Tada (2003) and Pareeksha (2007).

Throughout her career, Sulochana became particularly associated with mother roles in Hindi cinema. She frequently portrayed the mothers or close relatives of actors such as Sunil Dutt, Dev Anand and Rajesh Khanna.

== Personal life and death ==
Latkar lived in Prabhadevi, Mumbai. She entered into marriage at the age of 14 to S.K. Chavan, who was commonly known as Aabasaheb Chavan. This early marriage was a central aspect of her life, occurring well before her rise to prominence in the film industry.

Her daughter, Kanchan Ghanekar, was married to the renowned theatre and film actor Kashinath Ghanekar. Additionally, Sulochana had an adopted son named Ram Kelkar. He was married to the actress Jeevankala, who was a well-known performer in both Marathi and Hindi cinema. Through this lineage, the family's involvement in the performing arts continued; her granddaughter, Manisha Kelkar—the daughter of Ram Kelkar and Jeevankala also established a career as an actress.

Latkar died from respiratory failure at Shushrusha Hospital in Dadar, Mumbai, on 4 June 2023. She was 94.

== Awards ==
Latkar was a recipient of the civilian honour of Padma Shri (1999). She was awarded the Filmfare Lifetime Achievement Award in 2004. In 2009, she was awarded the Maharashtra Bhushan Award by the Government of Maharashtra. In 2021 she Received Filmfare Marathi Lifetime Achievement Award For Her Contribution in Marathi Cinema.

== See also ==
- Kashinath Ghanekar (Son-in-law married to Sulochana's daughter Kanchan)
