= Dus Lakh =

1966 Indian comedy film by Devendra Goel

- Film poster
- Directed by: Devendra Goel
- Produced by: Devendra Goel
- Starring: Sanjay Khan; Babita; Helen; Pran; Om Prakash
- Edited by: R.V. Shrikhande
- Music by: Ravi
- Release date: 1966
- Country: India
- Language: Hindi

Dus Lakh (English: Ten Lakhs or One Million) is a 1966 Indian Hindi-language comedy film. It was produced and directed by Devendra Goel. Music was composed by Ravi. The star cast included Sanjay Khan, Babita, Helen, Pran, Om Prakash, Manorama, Ramesh Deo, Seema Deo, and Neetu Singh. Babita made her acting debut through this film.

Om Prakash won the Filmfare Best Comedian Award and Asha Bhosle won the Filmfare Award for Best Female Playback Singer for the song "Garibon ki Suno" in 1967 for this movie.

== Plot ==
The story of the film revolves around how the fortunes of a family change after they inherit ten lakh rupees after becoming the sole beneficiary after the death of Gokulchand"s (Om Prakash) brother. He is a father of two children. His elder son Manohar (Ramesh Deo) has two kids (Munna and Roopa- baby Neetu Singh) and married to Devki (Seema Deo). His younger son Kishore (Sanjay Khan) is engaged to Rita (Babita) and they are happy. After inheriting ten lakhs Gokulchand goes on a holiday trip to Kashmir after becoming wealthy, he is entrapped by 2 foreigners; Jerry (Pran) and Mrs Little (Manorama), She pretends to be in love with him to take his money.

Gokulchand drives away his sons from his bungalow by a quarrel between Mrs Little and his sons, as he wants to marry her. The family has to shift to the slums nearby. Savitri (Praveen Paul) Rita's mother gives a necklace to Devki who loses it while leaving the house but is found by Jerry and thereby robbed by Kitty.

The eldest son gets injured while doing labour in a construction site. Kishore needs five thousand rupees for an operation of his brother. He begs his father, but Jerry tells Gokulchand that this is all a plan by his family to rob his inherited money. Gokulchand believes Jerry and throws Kishore out. During a pre-marriage party, his daughter in law Devki shows up with her little kids and begs with everyone at the party embarrassing Gokulchand. Jerry accuses her of doing it deliberately to insult Gokulchand and stop his wedding. She swears on her kids and witnesses the same jeweller that she had gone to sell her jewellery for want of money.

Enraged by knowing the truth about Jerry and Mrs Little, Gokulchand kicks them out of the house and goes into his room to get some money. Jerry arrives with Manorama and they make him unconscious and try to run away with a briefcase with all the cash, while setting Gokulchand in his room on fire to make it look like an accident. Kishore arrives, they fight and police comes in and arrest Jerry' and Mrs Little. Kishore saves his father. The operation of Manohar is successful, Finally Gokulchand donates all the money, which was root of the problem, to a Hospital. The film ends with the family talking about confirming Kishore and Rita's wedding. Kitty is a nurse now and thankful to Kishore for reforming her, while Jerry and Mrs Little are suffering in prison.

== Cast ==
- Sanjay Khan as Kishore
- Babita as Rita
- Helen as Kitty
- Pran as Jerry
- Om Prakash as Gokulchand
- Ramesh Deo as Manohar
- Seema Deo as Devki
- Praveen Paul as Savitri (Rita's Aunty)
- Brahmachari as William

== Soundtrack ==
The soundtrack was composed by Ravi and lyrics by Prem Dhawan and Ravi.

Song	Singer
"Ajab Teri Kaarigari Re Kartaar" (Part 1)	Mohammed Rafi, Krishna Kalle
"Ajab Teri Kaarigari Re Kartaar" (Part 2)	Mohammed Rafi
"Aa Lag Ja Gale Dilruba"	Mohammed Rafi
"Teri Patli Kamar, Teri Baali Umar"	Mohammed Rafi, Asha Bhosle
"Duniya Uski Sunti Hai, Yeh Duniya Uski Banti Hai"	Mohammed Rafi, Asha Bhosle
"Garibon Ki Suno, Woh Tumhari Sunega" (Duet)	Mohammed Rafi, Asha Bhosle
"Garibon Ki Suno, Woh Tumhari Sunega" (Solo)	Asha Bhosle
"Agre Ka Lala Angreji Dulhan Laya Re"	Asha Bhosle, Usha Mangeshkar
"Baaje Mori Payal Chhanan Chhanan"	Asha Bhosle, Usha Mangeshkar
