= Anjaana =

- Film poster
- Directed by: Mohan Kumar
- Written by: Ranjan Bose (screenplay)
- Produced by: Mohan Kumar
- Starring: Rajendra Kumar; Babita
- Music by: Laxmikant Pyarelal
- Release date: 26 December 1969
- Country: India
- Language: Hindi

Anjaana (transl. Unknown) is a 1969 Hindi-language romance film produced and directed by Mohan Kumar. The film stars Rajendra Kumar, Babita, Pran, Prem Chopra and Nirupa Roy. The music is by Laxmikant Pyarelal.

== Plot ==
Raju lives with his widowed mother, Janki, in a small town and works as garage mechanic. One day he meets with wealthy Rachna Malhotra, and after a few misunderstandings, both fall in love with each other. When Rachna's guardian, Diwan Mahendranat, finds out he forbids Rachna to ever see Raju again, as well as goes to Raju's house and humiliates his mother, for he wants Rachna to marry his son, Ramesh. An enraged Raju wants to avenge this humiliation and decides to teach Mahendranath a lesson. He enlists the help of his maternal uncle, Chamanlal Kapoor (Sunder), and together they succeed in fooling Mahendranath and making him give up all his money. But at the very last moment, Mahendranath finds out that he has been tricked, and together he and Ramesh conceive a plan that will bring Raju and his mother to their knees - a plan that will change their lives forever.

== Cast ==
- Rajendra Kumar as Raju
- Babita as Rachna Malhotra
- Nirupa Roy as Raju's Mother
- Pran as Diwan Mahendranath
- Prem Chopra as Ramesh
- Sunder as Chamanlal Kapoor (Cooper)
- Nazima as Munni
- Mohan Choti as Lallu
- Tuntun as Aunt Pampi (Mrs. Cooper)
- Mehmood Jr. as William

== Soundtrack ==
The soundtrack was composed by Laxmikant–Pyarelal on lyrics of Anand Bakshi.

Song	Singer	Raga
"Aa Meri Rani"	Mohammed Rafi	
"Jaan Chali Jaye, Jiya Nahin Jaye"	Mohammed Rafi, Suman Kalyanpur	
"Rim Jhim Ke Geet Sawan Gaye Bheegi Bheegi Raaton Mein"	Mohammed Rafi, Lata Mangeshkar	Shivaranjani
"Woh Kaun Hai"	Mukesh, Lata Mangeshkar	
"Main Rahi Anjaan"	Mohammed Rafi	
"Hum Bahenon Ke Liye"	Lata Mangeshkar	
