= Gogola (film) =

Lost 1966 Indian monster film

- Directed by: Balwant B Dave
- Produced by: T. M. Rai (Mukund Rai Trivedi)
- Starring: Azad; Tabassum; Polson
- Music by: Frank Fernand and Mukund Rai Trivedi
- Production company: Indra Dhanush Films
- Release date: 1966
- Country: India
- Language: Hindi

Gogola is a lost 1966 Indian Hindi-language giant monster film directed by Balwant B Dave and produced by Indra Dhanush Films. It is perhaps the first and only Hindi film whose titular character is a giant monster. Gogola is a bipedal aquatic reptile who can breathe fire.

The few remaining plot synopses suggest that Gogola borrows many elements from the original Godzilla film. The film was a knock-off of Godzilla and was seen as India’s answer to Godzilla. The film also has a song called "Nacho, nacho, Gogola". Frank Fernand provided the music for Gogola, along with Mukund Rai Trivedi who also produced the film under the name T. M. Rai (together credited as Rai & Frank), and Balkavi Bairagi wrote the lyrics.

The only remnants of its existence are a promotional poster that bills it as 'an action packed story of a Sea-monster with Thrills, Suspense and What Not? [sic]', lobby cards, its soundtrack, the cover of the lyrics leaflet, and a censor script, which have become collector's items.

== Plot ==
Gogola emerges from the ocean and attacks a group of teenagers on a beach. They inform the police of this incidence who outright deny that such a creature exists. Gogola however soon attacks Mumbai and makes landfall which prompts a military response. The military chases Gogola all the way to the ocean but stop right there as they lack jurisdiction over the ocean.

Kumar, Asha and Lacchoo were in the group which first saw Gogola on the beach. Asha's father, a scientist, creates a formula to destroy the monster. Kumar volunteers to administer the poison. His rival Lacchoo wants to kill him and claim both Asha and credit for Gogola's destruction.

However, Gogola soon returns. He lifts up the Gateway of India and then throws it at Flora Fountain. He destroys planes and tanks with a fiery breath. He floods the streets with water and many landmarks fall to the rising tide. Then everyone starts to sing and dance with the song "Nacho, nacho, Gogola". After this Gogola goes on a rampage, destroying more planes, tanks and every city landmark. Eventually Gogola is defeated.

== Cast ==
- Azad as Kumar
- Tabassum as Asha
- Polson
- Kumari Nazar
- Rani
- Nayam Palli
- Bhale Rao

== Release and reception ==
The film was released in 1966.

Songs from the film, Zara Kah Do Fizaon Se and Aaja Aaja Pyar Karen sung by Mubarak Begum with Talat Mahmood and Mahendra Kapoor respectively, were popular at the time, but the film was unsuccessful.
