= Tumse Achha Kaun Hai =

- Poster
- Directed by: Pramod Chakravorty
- Written by: Sachin Bhowmick
- Produced by: Pramod Chakravorty
- Starring: Shammi Kapoor; Babita; Mehmood; Lalita Pawar; Pran
- Cinematography: V. K. Murthy
- Music by: Shankar Jaikishan
- Release date: 1969
- Country: India
- Language: Hindi

Tumse Achha Kaun Hai (Note: The phrase literally translates as "Who is better than you", which implies a question. The figurative - and in fact, which every native Hindi speaking person instinctively understands is - "Nobody is better than you", or "you are the best". In fact the very original translation leads one to latter meaning. It is a rhetorical question, which intends to assert something, rather than ask.) is a 1969 Romantic-Comedy Drama Indian film, written by Sachin Bhowmick and produced-directed by Pramod Chakravorty. The film starred Shammi Kapoor, Babita, Mehmood, Lalita Pawar and Pran. The music was composed by the duo Shankar Jaikishan and song lyrics written by Hasrat Jaipuri.

== Plot ==
Ashok is unable to forgive himself that because of a childhood prank, his sister Roopa is blind. His only ambition is to have her eyesight restored. He learns about a new operation that can do so but the money required is way beyond his means.

A rich lady Sarojini, who hates love marriages because her twin sister had gone astray, and is taking care of her three granddaughters, wants them to have arranged marriages at all costs. She finds it difficult to get them married to young men of her choice because the eldest one (Asha) hates men and the other two are already in love. Sarojini offers Ashok the job of breaking the love affairs of the two younger sisters and making Asha agreeable to marrying a young man of her granny's choice. Ashok accepts the offer to get money for his sister's eye operation. In the process of carrying out this unusual assignment, Ashok himself falls in love with Asha. Granny is furious. She exposes Ashok as a hired hand and turns him out of the house. On reaching home empty-handed Ashok discovers that his blind sister (Roopa) has been raped by an unknown criminal in his absence and has gone missing. Swearing revenge, he sets out in search of the rapist.

Pran (the rapist) manages to get engaged to Asha in the meanwhile. In a criminal conspiracy, he abducts the granny and substitutes her evil twin in her place. Ashok gets injured in an explosion caused by Pran. In the hospital, he is nursed by Roopa, who has now recovered her eyesight, with help from a kind surgeon. But Roopa leaves the hospital when her brother regains consciousness. With the help of Asha's faithful chauffeur Mahesh, Ashok must find a way to foil Pran's conspiracy, rescue granny and save Asha from Pran's clutches.

== Cast ==
- Shammi Kapoor as Ashok
- Babita as Asha
- Pran as Pran
- Mehmood as Driver Mahesh
- Jayanthi as Roopa
- Lalita Pawar as Sarojini Devi/Sarita
- Rehman as Doctor
- Shubha Khote as Sheela
- Aruna Irani as Lily
- Leela Mishra as Sheela Mom
- Dhumal as Sheela Dad
- Mohan Choti as Servant
- Asit Sen
- Birbal as Sindhi Bridegroom
- Jagdish Raj as Police Inspector
- Murad as Jailer
- Madan Puri (Guest Appearance)
- Manmohan as Manmohan

== Soundtrack ==
#	Song	Singer
1	"Ganga Meri Maa Ka Naam"	Mohammed Rafi
2	"Janam Janam Ka Saath Hai"	Mohammed Rafi
3	"Tumse Achha Kaun Hai"	Mohammed Rafi
4	"Kis Kisko Pyaar Karun"	Mohammed Rafi
5	"Pyaar Ka Lekar Uran Khatola"	Mohammed Rafi, Sharda
6	"Rangat Teri Surat Si Kisi Mein Nahin"	Mohammed Rafi, Lata Mangeshkar
7	"Mujhe Kuch Hota Hai"	Lata Mangeshkar
