= Doli (film) =

- Directed by: Adurthi Subba Rao
- Written by: Adurthi Subba Rao (screenplay); Som Haksar, Rajendra Krishan (dialogues)
- Produced by: Hargobind Duggal
- Starring: Rajesh Khanna; Babita; Prem Chopra; Nazima
- Cinematography: Roy P.L.
- Edited by: T. Krishna
- Music by: Ravi
- Distributed by: Bahar Films Combines
- Release date: 1969
- Running time: 160 min
- Country: India
- Language: Hindi
- Box office: ₹2.2 crore (equivalent to ₹114 crore or US$12 million in 2023)

Doli (transl. Palanquin) is a 1969 Hindi-language film written and directed by Adurthi Subba Rao and stars Rajesh Khanna, Babita.

This film is counted among the 17 consecutive hit films of Rajesh Khanna between 1969 and 1971, by adding the two hero films Maryada and Andaz to the 15 consecutive solo hits he gave from 1969 to 1971. The film was a remake of the Telugu film Thene Manasulu.

== Plot ==
The story follows two college friends; Amar and Prem, whose lives get entangled with two neighbors: Asha and Shobha. Prem is selected by Govt. for further study in America. Prem's parents ask for 10000 Rs. in dowry from Shobha's father to fund Prem's journey to America. Shobha's father steals money for dowry from Asha's father and the theft is blamed on Asha's father. Burdened with shame Asha's father flees on the day of Asha's marriage with Amar. Amar's father breaks Amar's marriage with Asha. Asha falls on Amar's feet and requests Amar not to break the marriage. Amar does not listen to Asha and leaves without seeing Asha's face. On the same day Shobha's father gives money to Prem's father and Prem marries Shobha. Prem travels away and returns with the need for a new wife. Amar falls for Asha not knowing that he left her at the wedding altar and that she is his wife (he refused to look at her face). Lies, treachery, deception and intrigue follow the tale as Asha strives to clear her father's name of a crime he didn't commit and Amar falls for Asha, not knowing that the girl he cruelly rejected during his brash younger days is the same girl he is falling for now.

== Cast ==
- Rajesh Khanna as Amar Kumar
- Babita as Asha
- Prem Chopra as Prem
- Nazima as Shobha
- Om Prakash as Dwarka
- Nana Palsikar as Ganpat Lala
- Raj Mehra as Ramprasad
- Sulochana Latkar as Seeta
- Sunder as Basantlal
- Praveen Paul as Amar's Mother

== Soundtrack ==
The soundtrack was composed by Ravi and lyrics were penned by Rajendra Krishan.

#	Song	Singer
1	"Doli Chadhke Dulhan Sasural Chali"	Mahendra Kapoor
2	"Aaj Pila De Saaqi"	Mahendra Kapoor, Asha Bhosle
3	"Aaj Main Dekhun Jidhar Jidhar"	Asha Bhosle
4	"Pehle Jhukkar Karo Salaam"	Asha Bhosle
5	"Sajna Saath Nibhana"	Asha Bhosle, Mohammed Rafi
6	"Daanton Tale Dabakar Honth"	Mohammed Rafi
