= Babita =

Indian actress (born 1947)

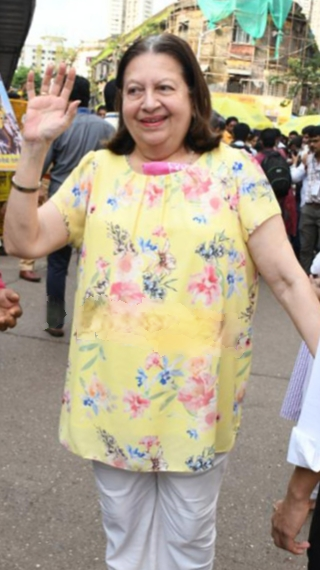
- Babita in 2023
- Born: Babita Shivdasani; 20 April 1947 (age 79); Karachi, Sind, British India
- Occupation: Actress
- Years active: 1966–1973
- Spouse: Randhir Kapoor (m. 1971)
- Children: 2 (Karisma and Kareena)
- Father: Hari Shivdasani
- Family: Kapoor family

Babita Shivdasani Kapoor (née Shivdasani; born 20 April 1947), also known mononymously as Babita, is an Indian retired actress who appeared in Hindi-language films.

The daughter of character actor Hari Shivdasani and the cousin of actress and her contemporary Sadhana Shivdasani, Babita's debut film was the successful drama Dus Lakh (1966), but it was the romantic thriller Raaz (1967), opposite Rajesh Khanna, that gained her recognition. From 1966 to 1973, she starred in nineteen films as the lead heroine, including the box office successes Farz (1967), Haseena Maan Jayegi, Kismat (both in 1968), Ek Shriman Ek Shrimati (1969), Doli (1969), Kab? Kyoon? Aur Kahan? (1970), Kal Aaj Aur Kal (1971) and Banphool (1971). Following her marriage to actor Randhir Kapoor in 1971, she acted in Jeet (1972) and Ek Hasina Do Diwane (1972). Her subsequent release in 1973 was an average success, after which she decided to leave her career and became a housewife.

== Background ==
Babita was born in Karachi to actor Hari Shivdasani, who was from a Sindhi Hindu family (settled in Bombay prior to and after the partition of India) and a British Roman Catholic mother, Barbara. The iconic actress Sadhana Shivdasani was her paternal cousin and contemporary.

== Career ==
Babita appeared in nineteen films. Her first film to release was the 1966 successful film Dus Lakh, which also starred Sanjay Khan, Om Prakash and her future sister-in-law, Neetu Singh. However, the first film she had signed was actually Raaz co-starring Rajesh Khanna, which was released in 1967. Her biggest box office successes were Dus Lakh, Ek Shrimaan Ek Shrimati and Haseena Maan Jayegi (1968), (with her future uncle-in-law) Shashi Kapoor, Farz, Banphool and Ek Hasina Do Diwane with Jeetendra, Doli with Rajesh Khanna, Tumse Achha Kaun Hai (1969) with her future uncle-in-law Shammi Kapoor, Kismat with Biswajeet, Kab? Kyoon? Aur Kahan? (1970) with Dharmendra and Pehchaan with Manoj Kumar. In 1971, she acted opposite her future husband Randhir Kapoor, as well as father-in-law Raj Kapoor and grandfather-in-law Prithviraj Kapoor in Kal Aaj Aur Kal. After her marriage to Randhir, they were cast together by director K. Shankar in Jeet, which was the remake of En Annan, starring M. G. Ramachandran and Jayalalithaa. She left the film industry in 1973 following her husband's family tradition of women not working in the acting profession.

== Personal life ==
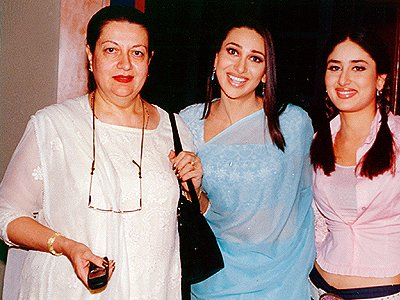
Babita with daughters Karisma and Kareena in 2003

Babita fell in love with Randhir Kapoor, while working with him in the film Kal Aaj Aur Kal (1971). They married in a lavish ceremony on 6 November 1971. They have two children, actresses Karisma Kapoor and Kareena Kapoor. Actor Saif Ali Khan is her son-in-law.

In the 1980s, Randhir's career as an actor started to decline and things soured between them. She and Randhir lived in separate homes for several years, even though they are still legally married and had no intention of divorcing. The couple briefly reunited in 2007 after living separately for several years.

== Filmography ==
Year	Film	Role	Notes
1966	Dus Lakh	Rita	Debut film
1967	Raaz	Sapna	
1967	Farz	Sunita	
1968	Kismat	Roma	
1968	Haseena Maan Jayegi	Archana (Archie)	
1968	Aulad	Bharti	
1969	Tumse Achha Kaun Hai	Asha	
1969	Ek Shrimaan Ek Shrimati	Deepali Lakhanpal	
1969	Doli	Asha	
1969	Anmol Moti	Manisha	
1969	Anjaana	Rachna Malhotra	
1970	Kab? Kyoon? Aur Kahan?	Asha Prasad	
1970	Pehchan	Barkha	
1971	Kal Aaj Aur Kal	Monica (Mona)	Appeared with Randhir Kapoor in his debut film
1971	Bikhre Moti	Indrani	
1971	Banphool	Gulabi	
1972	Jeet	Koyli / Rasili	
1972	Ek Hasina Do Diwane	Neeta	
1973	Sone Ke Haath	Prema	
