= Om Prakash =

Indian film actor (1919–1998)

- Prakash in 1975
- Born: Om Prakash Chibber; 19 December 1919; Lahore, Pakistan, British Raj
- Died: 21 February 1998 (aged 78); Mumbai, Maharashtra, India
- Occupation: Actor
- Years active: 1942–1994
- Spouse: Prabha Chibber

Om Prakash Chibber (19 December 1919 – 21 February 1998) was an Indian film actor. He was born in Lahore, Pakistan and was a well known character actor of Hindi Cinema. His most well-known movies are Mere Hamdam Mere Dost (1968), Padosan (1968), Gopi (1970), Hulchul (1971), Chupke Chupke (1975), Namak Halaal (1982), and Sharaabi (1984).

He also produced Jahanaara, starring Bharat Bhushan, Shashikala, Prithviraj Kapoor, and Mala Sinha.

Prakash played major characters in films including Dus Lakh, Annadata, Charandas, and Sadhu aur Shaitan. His roles in the films Dil Daulat Duniya, Gopi, Apna Desh, Chupke Chupke, Julie, Joroo Ka Ghulam, Aa Gale Lag Jaa, Pyar Kiye Jaa, Padosan, and Buddha Mil Gaya are considered to be among his best, along with Daddu in Namak Halaal and De Silva in Zanjeer. His roles in Sharaabi, Bharosa, Tere Ghar Ke Samne, Mere Hamdam Mere Dost, Loafer and Dil Tera Diwana were also appreciated.

Prakash played in many comedy films. His performances were well received in Naukar Biwi Ka (1983), Sharaabi (1984) and Chameli Ki Shaadi. His role in Gopi with Dilip Kumar is highly regarded. Some critics believe he gave better performances in tragic scenes in front of Dilip Kumar. Once Kumar revealed, "I was only afraid once in my acting career and it was during Gopi when Om Prakashji's performance overshadowed mine".

== Early life and education ==
Prakash was fascinated by theatre, music and films. He started taking lessons in classical music when he was twelve years old. He used to play the role of Sita in Ramlila of Jammu

== Career ==
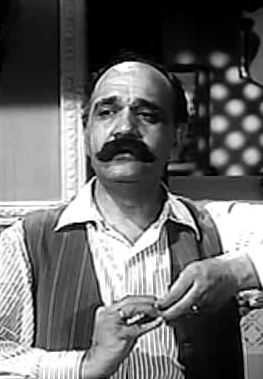
Om Prakash in the 1963 Hindi film Tere Ghar Ke Samne

Prakash joined All India Radio in 1937 at a monthly salary of Rs 25. He was known as "Fateh Din", a radio personality, and his programmes made him popular across Punjab.

He was regaling people at a wedding one day when filmmaker Dalsukh Pancholi asked to see him in his Lahore office. Pancholi gave Prakash his first break as an actor in the film Daasi. He was paid only Rs 80, but the film earned him fame. It was his first major role; he had played a bit role in Sharif Badmash, a silent film. He later played in Daasi and with Pancholi's Dhamki and Aayee Bahar.

Soon after the Partition, he came to Delhi and then to Bombay (now Mumbai). Baldev Raj Chopra noticed his talent when he was a film journalist and critic; he urged Prakash to carry on with his acting career. He was sure Om Prakash had the talent to prove himself a versatile actor, later winning acclaim and later had roles in films including Lahore, Char Din, and Raat Ki Rani. It was during this phase in his career that he played in Azaad with Dilip Kumar, Mera Naam Joker with Raj Kapoor; Miss Mary, Bahar, Pehli Jhalak, Asha, and Man-Mauji with Kishore Kumar; followed by Howrah Bridge with Ashok Kumar; and then Tere Ghar Ke Samne with Dev Anand. He was noted for his performance in both films in spite of celebrities like Kishore Kumar, Dilip Kumar, Raj Kapoor, Ashok Kumar and Dev Anand. He had developed his own style, which prompted him to work in the entertainment industry for the next forty years.

Om Prakash acted in 307 films. He won his first major award acting in Dus Lakh (1966). He has also played inHowrah Bridge (1958), Pyar Kiye Jaa (1966), Padosan (1968), Sadhu Aur Shaitaan (1968), Dil Daulat Duniya (1972), Chupke Chupke (1975), Gol Maal (1979), Namak Halaal (1982), and Chameli Ki Shaadi (1986). He proved that he could play mature roles with equal ease and depth, as shown in Chacha Zindabad, Khandan, Haryali Aur Raasta, Dil Apna Aur Preet Parai, Pati Patni, Neend Hamari Khwab Tumhare, Mere Hamdam Mere Dost, Annadata, Ek Shriman Ek Shrimati, Doli, Chirag, Amar Prem, Aankh Micholi, Ek Hasina Do Diwane, Anuraag, Zanjeer, Sagina, Aa Gale Lag Jaa, Loafer, Roti, Julie, Khushboo, Lawaaris, Bandish, Sharaabi and Chameli Ki Shaadi.

Outside of acting, Prakash produced films including Sanjog (1961), Jahan Ara (1964) and Gateway of India (1957).

== Death ==
Om Prakash suffered a massive heart attack at his home and was rushed to Lilavati Hospital in Mumbai. In there, Prakash suffered another heart attack and went into a coma from which he never recovered. He died on 21 February 1998.

== Selected filmography ==
- Daasi (1944) as Najam / Ragini / A.S.Gyani / Om Prakash Chibber / Kalavati / Khairati
- Zameen Aasmaan (1946)
- Chaman (1948, Punjabi film)
- Jalsa (1948)
- Ek Teri Nishani (1949)
- Naach (1949)
- Lachhi (1949) Punjabi movie
- Sawan Bhadon (1949)
- Raat Ki Rani (1949)
- Lahore (1949)
- Ek Teri Nishani (1949)
- Ghar Ki Numaish (1949)
- Char Din (1949)
- Bansaria (1949)
- Bhaiyya Ji (1950), he also directed; Punjabi movie
- Phumman (1950)
- Madari (1950)
- Sargam (1950) as Seth Roopchand
- Sabak (1950)
- Rupaiya (1950)
- Sabz Baag (1951)
- Nazneen (1951)
- Khazana (1951)
- Bahar (1951) as Choudhry Goverdhanlal Patwardhanlal
- Anhonee (1952) as Shyam Sundar Laddan
- Poonam (1952) as Sajju Ram Trivedi
- Hamari Duniya (1952)
- Ghungroo (1952)
- Shikast (1953) as Dheeru
- Rail Ka Dibba (1953) as Nirogi
- Lahren (1953)
- Ladki (1953) as Hazurdas
- Firdaus (1953)
- Dhuaan (1953)
- Chalis Baba Ek Chor (1953)
- Aas (1953) as Masterji
- Ramman (1954) (unreleased)
- Ilzam (1954)
- Dost (1954)
- Pooja (1954)
- Kavi (1954)
- Danka (1954)
- Chor Bazar (1954) as Yusuf Ustad
- Bazooband (1954) as Sanwariya
- Barati (1954)
- Marine Drive (1955)
- Sitara (1955)
- Shri Nagad Narayan (1955)
- Pehli Jhalak (1955) as Jwalaprasad Raiseazam
- Musafirkhana (1955) as Gulyar Khan Kabuli
- Lutera (1955)
- Lagan (1955)
- Kundan (1955) as Uma's foster father
- Hoor-E-Arab (1955)
- Duniya Gol Hai (1955)
- Bhagwat Mahima (1955)
- Azaad (1955) as Head Constable Motilal
- Albeli (1955)
- Shrimati 420 (1956)
- Mem Sahib (1956) as Brothel Patron
- Patrani (1956) as Vichitram
- Fifty Fifty (1956)
- Dhake Ki Malmal (1956)
- Chhoo Mantar (1956) as Gulzar Khan (uncredited)
- Bhai-Bhai (1956) as Bulbul
- Basant Bahar (1956) as Narsin
- Muklawa (Punjabi film) (1957)
- Sheroo (1957)
- Sharada (1957) as Mohan (Guest Appearance)
- Miss Mary (1957) as Nakdau
- Gateway of India (1957) as Man with broken wrist watch
- Garma Garam (1957)
- Ek Jhalak (1957)
- Bhabhi (1957) as Lata's father-in-law
- Aasha (1957) as Hasmukhlal
- Miss 58 (1958)
- Chandu (1958)
- Taxi Stand (1958)
- Sohni Mahiwal (1958)
- Police (1958)
- Karigar (1958) as Girdhari
- Howrah Bridge (1958) as Shyamu, Tangewala
- Baghi Sipahi (1958)
- Amardeep (1958) as Man who gets conned
- Pyar Ki Rahen (1959)
- Kanhaiya (1959) as Vedji
- Didi (1959) as Lala Daulatram
- Chacha Zindabad (1959) as Contractor Mr. Verma ( He Directed this movie also )
- Zalim Jadugar (1960)
- Patang (1960) as Bhole Nath
- Mehlon Ke Khwab (1960) as Hotel Manager
- Jaali Note (1960) as C.I.D. Constable Pandu / Nandlal (uncredited)
- Dil Apna Aur Preet Parai (1960) as Girdhari
- College Girl (1960) as Hakeem Ramprasad
- Bindya (1960) as Shastriji
- Aanchal (1960) as Constable Dharamdas
- Sanjog (1961) as Diwan Girdharilal
- Do Bhai (1961) as Kashi Nath
- Bhabhi Ki Chudiyan (1961) as Prabha's dad
- Hong Kong (1962)
- Hariyali Aur Rasta (1962) as Joseph
- Isi Ka Naam Duniya Hai (1962)
- Shaadi (1962) as Seth Daulatram
- Naughty Boy (1962) as Vaidraj Churandas 'Jari-Bhuti' Chaturvedi
- Manmauji (1962) as Rai Saheb Bhola Ram
- Dil Tera Diwana (1962) as Captain Dayaram
- Half Ticket (1962)
- Tere Ghar Ke Samne (1963) as Lala Jagannath, Rakesh's Father
- Bharosa (1963) as Laxmiprasad Daulatram
- Pyaar Kiya To Darna Kya (1963) as Asharam
- Nartakee (1963) .... Seth. Jamna Das
- Kahin Pyaar Na Ho Jaaye (1963)
- Jab Se Tumhe Dekha Hai (1963) .... Qawwal
- Daal Me Kala (1964) .... Banke Bihari
- Suhagan (1964) .... Dukhiram
- Maain Bhi Ladki Hun (1964) .... Din Dayal 'Raja'
- Raj Kumar (1964) .... Bimasal
- Cha Cha Cha (1964) .... Dinanath
- Mera Qasoor Kya Hai (1964) .... Rasila
- Kaise Kahoon (1964) .... Mamaji
- Jahan Ara (1964)
- Door Ki Awaaz (1964) .... Dhanpath Rai
- Aap Ki Parchhaiyan (1964) .... Asha's dad
- Naya Kanoon (1965) .... Om Prakash Munshi
- Khandan (1965) .... Jeevandas Lal
- Duniya Hai Dilwalon Ki (1966)
- Pyar Kiye Jaa (1966) .... Ramlal
- Pati Patni (1966) .... Dhanprasad
- Neend Hamari Khwab Tumhare (1966) .... Ajoo Hajam / Nawab Ajmutullah Khan
- Labela (1966)
- Kunwari (1966)
- Dus Lakh (1966) .... Gokulchand
- Do Dilon Ki Dastaan (1966)
- Laat Saheb (1967) .... Munshi
- Around the World (1967)
- Aman (1967) .... Hurato
- Do Kaliyaan (1968) .... Kiran's Father
- Padosan (1968) .... Kunverji - friendly appearance
- Sadhu Aur Shaitaan (1968) .... Sadhuram
- Parivar (1968) .... Karamchand
- Mere Hamdam Mere Dost (1968) .... Dhand Melaram
- Kanyadaan (1968) .... Bansi
- Gauri (1968) .... Maniram
- Ek Kali Muskai (1968) .... Lala Saheb
- Man Ka Meet (1969) .... Lala Balwant Rai
- Soldier as Thakur Daler Singh (1969)
- Pyaasi Sham (1969) .... Shankarlal's dad
- Sajan (1969) .... Driver - Balam
- Ek Shriman Ek Shrimati (1969) .... Mama Ji / Choudhry Sahab
- Doli (1969) .... Dwarka (Prem's dad) (as Om Parkash)
- Chirag (1969) .... Dr. O.P. Chibber
- Badi Didi (1969) .... Dayal
- Suhana Safar (1970)
- Mera Naam Joker (1970) .... Dr. Om Prakash (Gemini Circus) (Guest Appearance)
- Saas Bhi Kabhi Bahu Thi (1970) .... Motilal Chaudhary
- Pushpanjali (1970) .... Major Bharti
- Purab Aur Paschim (1970) as Mohan's father-in-law (Guest Appearance)
- Gopi (1970) as Girdharilal
- Ghar Ghar Ki Kahani (1970) as Sadhuram
- Aansoo Aur Muskan (1970) as Anwar
- Parwana (1971) as Ashok Varma
- Paraya Dhan (1971) as Gangaram
- Buddha Mil Gaya (1971) .... Girdharilal Sharma
- Narad Leela (1972)
- Maalik Tere Bande Hum (1972)
- Kavi Sammelan (1972)
- Amar Prem (1972) .... Natwarlal
- Ek Hasina Do Diwane (1972) .... Major - Neeta's dad
- Joroo Ka Ghulam (1972) .... Shyamlal
- Sub Ka Saathi (1972) .... Maya Das
- Rani Mera Naam (1972)
- Mome Ki Gudiya (1972) .... Dindayal
- Dil Daulat Duniya (1972) .... Udharchand Shikarpuri
- Apna Desh (1972) .... Dharamdas
- Annadata (1972) .... Ambarprasad
- Aankh Micholi (1972) .... Seth Ramlal
- Jai Hanuman (1973)
- Loafer (1973) .... Gopinath
- Sone Ke Hath (1973)
- Zanjeer (1973) .... De Silva
- Aa Gale Lag Jaa (1973) .... Preeti's father
- Teen Chor (1973)
- Phagun (1973) .... Dr. M.K. Effendi
- Man Jeete Jag Jeet (1973) .... Punjabi
- Kahani Hum Sab Ki (1973) .... Bhagwan Das
- Shubdin (1974)
- Kshitij (1974)
- Naya Din Nai Raat (1974) .... Banarasilal
- Do Chattane (1974) .... Pagal Chacha
- Sagina (1974) .... Guru
- International Crook (1974) .... Havaldar Rao
- Roti (1974) .... Lalaji
- Dukh Bhanjan Tera Naam (1974)
- Chowkidar (1974) .... Shambhu
- Archana (1974) .... Dr. Arun
- Vardaan (1975) .... Banwari Sharma
- Romeo in Sikkim (1975)
- Aandhi (1975) .... Lallu Lal (Campaign Manager)
- Julie (1975) .... Maurice (Julie's Father)
- Chupke Chupke (1975) .... Raghavendra Sharma (Raghav)
- Sunehra Sansar (1975) .... Shankarlal
- Raaja (1975) .... Rani's Father
- Dhoti Lota Aur Chowpatty (1975)
- Khushboo (1975)
- Sangat (1976)
- Papi Tarey Anek (1976)
- Nehle Pe Dehla (1976) .... Mangal
- Maa (1976) .... Gopaldas (Nimmi's dad)
- Alaap (1977) .... Triloki Prasad
- Aashiq Hoon Baharon Ka (1977) .... Mr. Jamunadas
- Tinku (1977) .... Ramdin
- Saheb Bahadur (1977) .... Dy. Collector Hare Murari
- Mera Vachan Geeta Ki Kasam (1977) .... Yar Khan
- Duniyadari (1977) .... Barkha's Father
- Charandas (1977) .... Charandas
- Aakhri Goli (1977)
- Sone Ki Lanka (1978)
- Naya Daur (1978) .... Chopra
- Parmatma (1978) .... Hotel Clerk (voice, uncredited)
- Nawab Sahib (1978) .... Nawab Sahib
- Hamara Sansar (1978) .... Seth HarishChandra
- Daku Aur Jawan (1978) .... Bansi
- Gol Maal (1979) .... Senior Police Officer
- Sukhi Pariwar (1979) .... Kuldeep's office worker
- Bebus (1979)
- Do Premee (1980) .... Retd. Col. Bhagwant Singh
- Do Aur Do Paanch (1980) .... Ustad, Prisoner #203 (Guest Appearance)
- Abdullah (1980) .... Pandit
- Bandish (1980) .... Kishan's dad
- Aas Paas (1981) .... Seema's Father
- Naram Garam (1981) as Swamiji (Special appearance)
- Lawaaris (1981) as Dr. Goel
- Itni Si Baat (1981) as Mukundilal
- Biwi-O-Biwi (1981) as Chander's Father (uncredited)
- Dhanwan (1981)
- Ek Aur Ek Gyarah (1981) as Biharilal
- Sharada (1981) .... Taradevi's husband
- Maan Gaye Ustaad (1981) .... Abba
- Bharosa (1981)
- Eent Ka Jawab Patthar (1982) .... Nawab Saab
- Namak Halaal (1982) .... Dasrath Singh (Daddu)
- Badle Ki Aag (1982) .... Man needed money for daughter's marriage (uncredited)
- Dil-E-Nadaan (1982) as Asha's dad
- Prem Rog (1982) as Panditji
- Dharam Kanta (1982) .... Fakira
- Johnny I Love You (1982) .... Colonel
- Love in Goa (1983) .... Vinayak Rao
- Rang Birangi (1983) .... Retired Judge Ajit Bannerjee
- Naukar Biwi Ka (1983) .... Jagirdar Bishamber Nath
- Shubh Kaamna (1983) .... Vithalbhai
- Pyaasi Aankhen (1983)
- Ek Din Bahu Ka (1983) as Lalaji - Father in law (uncredited)
- Sharaabi (1984) as Munshi Phoolchand
- Raaj Tilak (1984) .... Sardar Zuberi
- Ram Ki Ganga (1984) .... Ramdas
- Yeh Ishq Nahin Aasaan (1984) .... Nawab
- Raja Aur Rana (1984) .... Imran Khan
- Pyaase Honth (1985) .... Shambhu
- Do Dilon Ki Dastaan (1985) .... Mr. Saxena
- Meetha Zehar (1985)
- Alag Alag (1985) .... Khan
- Awara Baap (1985) .... Seth Gopal Das / Gopu
- Kali Basti (1985) .... Peter Pereira
- Kaanch Ki Deewar (1986) .... Dhurjan's victim
- Chameli Ki Shaadi (1986) .... Mastram Pehalwan
- Bhagwan Dada (1986) .... Drunken husband
- Karamdaata (1986) .... Khan (doctor)
- Insaniyat Ke Dushman (1987) .... Saxena
- Imaandaar (1987) .... Mr. Nath
- Kalyug Aur Ramayan (1987) .... Dashrath
- Rahi (1987) .... Dindayal
- Hawalaat (1987) .... Raghu (old man, drug addict prisoner)
- Muqaddar Ka Faisla (1987) .... Dayaram
- Mohabbat Ke Dushman (1988) .... Pandit
- Halaal Ki Kamai (1988)
- Bees Saal Baad (1988) .... Sarju, Nisha's Father
- Wafaa (1990) .... Rai Bahadur Shanker Dayal
- Pati Patni Aur Tawaif (1990) .... Tarachand
- Ghar Ho To Aisa (1990) .... Karamchand
- Pratikar (1991) .... Shankar Prasad
- Lakshmanrekha (1991) .... Gafoor Bhai
- Ye Hai Ghar Ki Mahabharata (1992) .... Jamnadas
- Kabhi Dhoop Kabhi Chhaon (1992)
- Shuruaat (1993) .... Jang Bahadur
- Ghar Ki Izzat (1994) .... Mona's poor dad
- Bhai No 1 (2000) .... Mr. Bakshi (final film role)
