= Ek Shrimaan Ek Shrimati =

- movie poster
- Directed by: Bhappi Sonie
- Written by: Sachin Bhowmick
- Screenplay by: Sachin Bhowmick
- Produced by: Surinder Kapoor
- Starring: Shashi Kapoor; Babita
- Cinematography: Taru Dutt
- Edited by: M. S. Shinde
- Music by: Kalyanji-Anandji
- Release date: 1969
- Running time: 140 min.
- Country: India
- Language: Hindi

Ek Shrimaan Ek Shrimati is a 1969 Indian Bollywood film directed by Bhappi Sonie and produced by Surinder Kapoor. It stars Shashi Kapoor and Babita in pivotal roles.

== Plot ==
Ek Shriman Ek Shrimati is a story about Pritam (Shashi Kapoor) and Deepali (Babita Kapoor). Pritam falls for Deepali who has already chosen Ajit (Prem Chopra) as her life partner. After having a few comical encounters with Deepali's uncle (Om Prakash), Pritam wins the favour of her uncle. Soon with the help of her uncle, Pritam wins the love of Deepali.

== Cast ==
- Shashi Kapoor as Pritam
- Babita as Deepali Lakhanpal
- Rajendra Nath as Ram Bharose Agnihotri
- Prem Chopra as Ajit Choudhary
- Om Prakash as Deepali's uncle
- Kamini Kaushal as Rama
- Helen as Sherry

== Soundtrack ==
Song	Singer
"Aaye Baithe Khaaye Peeye"	Mohammed Rafi
"Kuch Kahe To Khafa"	Mohammed Rafi
"Chandni Raat Mein"	Mohammad Rafi
"Jeevan Path Par Pyar Ne Chhedi Madhur Madhur Sargam"	Mohammed Rafi, Lata Mangeshkar
"Pyar To Ek Din Hona Tha, Ho Gaya, Ho Gaya"	Mohammed Rafi, Asha Bhosle
"Raja Tohe Nainon Se Madira"	Asha Bhosle
"Hello Hello Everybody"	Asha Bhosle
