= Mehmood Ali family =

Relatives of Indian actor Mehmood Ali

Mehmood Ali, popularly known simply as Mehmood, was an Indian actor, director and producer best known for playing comic roles in Hindi films. During his career of more than four decades, he worked in over 300 films. He has played many unforgettable roles in movies of 70's & 80's decade.

== Family ==
His family included many other entertainers.

- His father Mumtaz Ali was a dancer and character-artist in films from the 1940s era. His dance troupe "Mumtaz Ali Nites" performed all over India. His career slumped due to his alcoholism, leading Mehmood to work as a child artist and daughter Meenu Mumtaz to work as a dancer in his stage shows and later movies. He was last seen in the 1974 Hindi movie Kunwara Baap directed by Mehmood in the song "Saj Rahi Gali Meri Maa".
- His mother was Latifunnisa.
- His sister Malikunnisa Ali a.k.a. Minoo Mumtaz was re-christened as Minoo by Meena Kumari, Mehmood's sister-in-law. She started off as a stage dancer and later danced in many films of the 50s and 60s. Her first film was Sakhi Hateem. She played the lead role opposite Balraj Sahni in Black Cat (1959). She is the dancer in the song "Saqiya aaj mujhe neend nahin aayegi" in Sahib Bibi Aur Ghulam. She can also be seen in the song "Boojh Mera Kya Naam Re" from the movie CID
- Brother Anwar Ali debuted in the movie Sadhu Aur Shaitaan in 1968. His first major role was in the K. A. Abbas’s film Saat Hindustani. He worked in movies such as Wafaa, Albela, Caravan, Parwana, Bansi Birju, Manzil, Sabse Bada Rupaiya. He played Driver "Rajesh" in Bombay to Goa where Mehmood played conductor "Khanna". He co-produced the Kunwaara Baap, Khud-daar and Kaash.
- Mehmood's first wife, Mah Laqa, was a prominent child actress in Hindi films during the 1940s, better known as Baby Madhuri. Her filmography included Sandesha (1940), Muqabala (1942), Vishvas (1943) and Bachpan (1945). Mah Laqa's sister was actress Meena Kumari.
- Mehmood's eldest son Masood Ali a.k.a. Pucky Ali played a role in the movie Ek Baap Chhe Bete and Hamare Tumhare.
- Second son Maqsood Mehmood Ali a.k.a. Lucky Ali started his movie career as an adult in Yehi Hai Zindagi. He later became a singer songwriter and composer.
- Third son Maqdoom Ali a.k.a. Macky Ali played a disabled child in Mehmood's 1974 movie Kunwara Baap as he was in real life affected by polio. He acted in the movie Ek Baap Chhe Bete. He later made a music album and appeared in the music video Yaaron sab dua karo and later in Tirchi topiwale, sung by Altaf Raja.
- Fourth son Masoom Ali (born 3 December, 1961) is a real estate agent in the USA, and not to be confused with the person of the same name (born 31 October, 1965) who produced the movie Dushman Duniya Ka and acted in Ek Baap Chhe Bete.
- Second wife Tracy Ali played the role of the American wife in the movie Ek Baap Chhe Bete.
- Fifth son Mansoor Ali (by Tracy Ali) acted in Ek Baap Chhe Bete. Returning from USA after 14 years he released a video song album Sabrina dedicated to his daughter Sabrina Ali & late father in February 2012.
- Sixth son Manzoor Ali (by Tracy Ali) played the lead role of drug addicted youth in the movie Dushman Duniya Ka and earlier acted in Ek Baap Chhe Bete.
- Daughter Jeanie a.k.a. Latifunnisa a.k.a. Ginny Ali (by Tracy Ali) played the child actor role in Ginny Aur Johnny.
