= Filmfare Award for Best Performance in a Comic Role =

Part of Filmfare's annual awards for Hindi films

The Filmfare Best Comedian Award is given by Filmfare as part of its annual Filmfare Awards for Hindi films, to recognise outstanding performance of actors in a comic role.

Although the awards started in 1954, awards for the best comedian category started only in 1967, and has been marked as obsolete since 2007.

== Superlatives ==
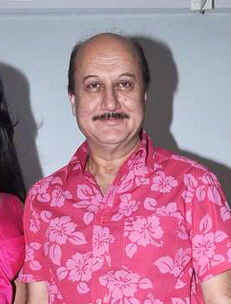
Anupam Kher has the record of maximum wins in this category

Category	Name	Superlative	Notes
Most Awards	Anupam Kher	5 awards	Awards resulted from 10 nominations
Most Nominations	Mehmood	19 nominations	Nominations resulted in 4 awards.
Most Nominations without a Win	Jagdeep, Laxmikant Berde	4 nominations	–

Anupam Kher holds the record for the most wins in this category with five awards, followed by Mehmood with four, and Deven Verma and Utpal Dutt, each with three. Kher also holds the record for the most consecutive wins, having won the award three years in a row from 1992 to 1994.

Mehmood holds the record for the most nominations in this category, with 19. He also received the highest number of nominations in a single year, garnering three out of five total nominations in 1975, ultimately winning for his performance in Vardaan.

=== Multiple wins ===
Wins	Recipient
5	Anupam Kher
4	Mehmood
3	Deven Verma, Utpal Dutt
2	Asrani, Paintal, Satish Kaushik, Johnny Lever, Paresh Rawal, Saif Ali Khan

=== Multiple nominations ===
Nominations	Recipient
19	Mehmood
13	Deven Verma, Johnny Lever
12	Asrani
10	Kader Khan, Anupam Kher
9	Paresh Rawal
6	Shakti Kapoor
5	Keshto Mukherjee, Govinda
4	Jagdeep, Utpal Dutt, Laxmikant Berde
3	Johnny Walker, Ravi Baswani
2	Om Prakash, I. S. Johar, Paintal, Amjad Khan, Satish Kaushik, Saif Ali Khan, Anil Kapoor, Boman Irani, Akshay Kumar, Salman Khan, Arshad Warsi

== Winners and nominees ==
=== 1960s ===
Year	Photos of winners	Actor	Role(s)	Film	Ref.
1967 14th		Mehmood ‡	Atma	Pyar Kiye Jaa	
1967 14th		Mehmood	Mahesh	Love in Tokyo	
1967 14th		Om Prakash	Ramlal	Pyar Kiye Jaa	
1968 15th		Om Prakash ‡	Gokulchand	Dus Lakh	
1968 15th		Johnny Walker	Padampath	Pati Patni	
1968 15th		Mehmood	Madhu	Mehrban	
1969 16th		Johnny Walker	Teju	Shikar	
1969 16th		Mehmood	Girdhar Gopal Agarwal	Neel Kamal	
1969 16th		Mehmood	Bajrang "Birju"	Sadhu Aur Shaitaan	

=== 1970s ===
Year	Photos of winners	Actor	Role(s)	Film	Ref.
1970 (17th)		Mehmood ‡	Rajan / Ram Kumar / Rajan's mother	Waris	
1970 (17th)		Johnny Walker	Ghasitaram Aashiq	Haseena Maan Jayegi	
1970 (17th)		Mehmood	Shambhu	Meri Bhabhi	
1971 (18th)		I. S. Johar ‡	Pehlaram / Dujaram / Teejaram	Johny Mera Naam	
1971 (18th)		Jagdeep	Mahesh	Khilona	
1971 (18th)		Mehmood	Shivram / Balram / Parshuram	Humjoli	
1972 (19th)		Mehmood ‡	Munna Sarkar	Paras	
1972 (19th)		Jagdeep	Jugal Kishore	Ek Nari Ek Brahmachari	
1972 (19th)		Mehmood	Sundar	Main Sundar Hoon	
1973 (20th)		Paintal ‡	Guruji	Bawarchi	
1973 (20th)		Jagdeep	Jaggi	Bhai Ho To Aisa	
1973 (20th)		Mehmood	Khanna	Bombay to Goa	
1974 (21st)		Asrani ‡	Champak Bhumia / Amit Desai	Aaj Ki Taaza Khabar	
1974 (21st)		Asrani	Dhondu	Namak Haraam	
1974 (21st)		I. S. Johar	Ramji	Aaj Ki Taaza Khabar	
1974 (21st)		Mehmood	Pavitra Kumar Rai "Puttan" / Mani	Do Phool	
1974 (21st)		Pran	Rana Ramlal Chauhan	Victoria No. 203	
1975 (22nd)		Mehmood ‡	Nandlal	Vardaan	
1975 (22nd)		Asrani	Murli / Bhaskar	Bidaai	
1975 (22nd)		Asrani	Bhalua	Chor Machaye Shor	
1975 (22nd)		Mehmood	Master Badri Prasad	Duniya Ka Mela	
1975 (22nd)		Mehmood	Mahesh	Kunwara Baap	
1976 (23rd)		Deven Verma ‡	Parvin Chandra Shah	Chori Mera Kaam	
1976 (23rd)		Asrani	Kanhaiyalal Chaturvedi	Rafoo Chakkar	
1976 (23rd)		Asrani	Jailor	Sholay	
1976 (23rd)		Keshto Mukherjee	Drunkard	Kaala Sona	
1976 (23rd)		Mehmood	Bajrangi	Qaid	
1977 (24th)		Asrani ‡	Sharat	Balika Badhu	
1977 (24th)		Asrani	Nagesh Shastri	Chhoti Si Baat	
1977 (24th)		Deven Verma	Narendra	Arjun Pandit	
1977 (24th)		Deven Verma	Lurkuram	Ek Se Badhkar Ek	
1977 (24th)		Mehmood	Neki Ram	Sabse Bada Rupaiya	
1978 (25th)		Paintal ‡	Peter	Chala Murari Hero Banne	
1978 (25th)		Deven Verma	Timsi's Uncle	Doosra Aadmi	
1978 (25th)		Keshto Mukherjee	Kesto	Chacha Bhatija	
1978 (25th)		Manik Dutt		Safed Jhooth	
1978 (25th)		Mukri	Mangal Dada	Tyaag	
1979 (26th)		Deven Verma ‡	Parvin Bhai / Jaikishan "Jackson"	Chor Ke Ghar Chor	
1979 (26th)		Asrani	Abdul Karim Durrani	Pati Patni Aur Woh	
1979 (26th)		Deven Verma	Dara	Khatta Meetha	
1979 (26th)		Keshto Mukherjee	Ramesh Sharma	Azaad	
1979 (26th)		Ram Sethi	Pyarelal	Muqaddar Ka Sikandar	

=== 1980s ===
Year	Photos of winners	Actor	Role(s)	Film	Ref.
1980 (27th)		Utpal Dutt ‡	Bhawani Shankar	Gol Maal	
1980 (27th)		Asrani	Gopi	Sargam	
1980 (27th)		Deven Verma	Himself	Gol Maal	
1980 (27th)		Deven Verma	Chitragupt Sharma	Lok Parlok	
1980 (27th)		Mehmood	Dayal / Amar	Nauker	
1981 (28th)		Keshto Mukherjee ‡	Ashrafi Lal	Khubsoorat	
1981 (28th)		Asrani	P. K. Lal	Hum Nahin Sudherenge	
1981 (28th)		Deven Verma	Ram Narayan "R.N."	Judaai	
1981 (28th)		Deven Verma	Noor-e-Chasmis	Thodisi Bewafaii	
1981 (28th)		Keshto Mukherjee	Ram Prasad	Be-Reham	
1982 (29th)		Utpal Dutt ‡	Bhavani Shankar Bajpai	Naram Garam	
1982 (29th)		Anoop Kumar	Jagmohan	Chalti Ka Naam Zindagi	
1982 (29th)		Asrani	Hari	Ek Duuje Ke Liye	
1982 (29th)		Rakesh Bedi	Omi Sharma	Chashme Buddoor	
1982 (29th)		Ravi Baswani	Jomo Lakhanpal	Chashme Buddoor	
1983 (30th)		Deven Verma ‡	Bahadur / Bahadur	Angoor	
1983 (30th)		Ashok Kumar	Om Prakash Chaudhary	Shaukeen	
1983 (30th)		Jagdeep	Narmada	Ghazab	
1983 (30th)		Mehmood	Jaggan	Khud-Daar	
1983 (30th)		Utpal Dutt	Jagdishbhai	Shaukeen	
1984 (31st)		Utpal Dutt ‡	Dhurandhar Bhatawdekar	Rang Birangi	
1984 (31st)		Deven Verma	Ravi Kapoor	Rang Birangi	
1984 (31st)		Dharmendra	Deepak Kumar 'Deepu' / Raja	Naukar Biwi Ka	
1984 (31st)		Kader Khan	Munim Narayandas Gopaldas	Himmatwala	
1984 (31st)		Shakti Kapoor	Ranjeet	Mawaali	
1985 (32nd)		Ravi Baswani ‡	Sudhir Mishra	Jaane Bhi Do Yaaro	
1985 (32nd)		Dada Kondke	Gangaram	Tere Mere Beech Mein	
1985 (32nd)		Ravi Baswani	Siddharth "Sidey"	Ab Ayega Mazaa	
1985 (32nd)		Satish Shah	D'Mello	Jaane Bhi Do Yaaro	
1985 (32nd)		Shakti Kapoor	Kaamesh Singh	Tohfa	
1986 (33rd)		Amjad Khan ‡	Chakradhari	Maa Kasam	
1986 (33rd)		Amjad Khan	Vatsayana	Utsav	
1986 (33rd)		Annu Kapoor	Masseur	Utsav	
1986 (33rd)		Deven Verma	Pareshan	Saaheb	
1986 (33rd)		Kader Khan	Vishwapratap Gyandev Agnihotri	Aaj Ka Daur	
1987	NO CEREMONY				
1988	NO CEREMONY				
1989 (34th)	Not Awarded				

=== 1990s ===
Year	Photos of winners	Actor	Role(s)	Film	Ref.
1990 (35th)		Anupam Kher; Satish Kaushik ‡	Devdhar Shastri; Kanshiram Dey	Ram Lakhan	
1990 (35th)		Kader Khan	Daruka	Sikka	
1990 (35th)		Laxmikant Berde	Manohar Singh	Maine Pyar Kiya	
1991 (36th)		Kader Khan ‡	Raman / Dayashankar "Daddu"	Baap Numbri Beta Dus Numbri	
1992 (37th)		Anupam Kher ‡	Prem Anand	Lamhe	
1992 (37th)		Anupam Kher	Seth Dharamchand	Dil Hai Ki Manta Nahin	
1992 (37th)		Kader Khan	Chittori Pratap Sinha / Satrangi	Hum	
1992 (37th)		Laxmikant Berde	Balam	100 Days	
1993 (38th)		Anupam Kher ‡	Seema's Uncle	Khel	
1993 (38th)		Anupam Kher	Indramohan Lathi	Shola Aur Shabnam	
1993 (38th)		Laxmikant Berde	Pandu Dhondu Bikajirao	Beta	
1994 (39th)		Anupam Kher ‡	Vijay Awasti	Darr	
1994 (39th)		Anupam Kher	Professor Vishwamitra	Shreemaan Aashique	
1994 (39th)		Anupam Kher	Dinanath	Waqt Hamara Hai	
1994 (39th)		Johnny Lever	Babu Lal	Baazigar	
1994 (39th)		Kader Khan	Hasmukh Rai / Gauri Shankar's father	Aankhen	
1995 (40th)		Shakti Kapoor ‡	Nandu	Raja Babu	
1995 (40th)		Kader Khan	Ram Lal / DCP	Main Khiladi Tu Anari	
1995 (40th)		Laxmikant Berde	Lallu Prasad	Hum Aapke Hain Koun..!	
1995 (40th)		Shakti Kapoor	Crime Master Gogo	Andaz Apna Apna	
1995 (40th)		Paresh Rawal	Kashinath Sahoo	Mohra	
1996 (41st)		Anupam Kher ‡	Dharamvir Malhotra	Dilwale Dulhania Le Jayenge	
1996 (41st)		Ashok Saraf	Badal Munshi a.k.a. Munshiji	Karan Arjun	
1996 (41st)		Johnny Lever	Linghaiyya Tripur	Karan Arjun	
1996 (41st)		Kader Khan	Choudhry Hoshiyar Chand Shikaarpuri Barudwallah	Coolie No. 1	
1997 (42nd)		Satish Kaushik ‡	Muranchand "Mutthu" Swami	Saajan Chale Sasural	
1997 (42nd)		Johnny Lever	Balwant Singh	Raja Hindustani	
1997 (42nd)		Kader Khan	Dhirendra Khurana	Saajan Chale Sasural	
1997 (42nd)		Navneet Nishan	Kamal "Kammo" Singh	Raja Hindustani	
1997 (42nd)		Shakti Kapoor	Bhiku	Loafer	
1998 (43rd)		Johnny Lever ‡	Gafoor Ali	Deewana Mastana	
1998 (43rd)		Johnny Lever	Harish "Harry" Jain	Judaai	
1998 (43rd)		Om Puri	Banwarilal Pandit	Chachi 420	
1998 (43rd)		Paresh Rawal	Hari Bhai	Chachi 420	
1998 (43rd)		Shakti Kapoor	Rangeela Prakash	Judwaa	
1999 (44th)		Johnny Lever ‡	Baankey Lal Chaurasia	Dulhe Raja	
1999 (44th)		Anupam Kher	Mr. Malhotra	Kuch Kuch Hota Hai	
1999 (44th)		Archana Puran Singh	Ms. Braganza	Kuch Kuch Hota Hai	
1999 (44th)		Johnny Lever	Colonel Almeida	Kuch Kuch Hota Hai	
1999 (44th)		Kader Khan	K. K. Singhania	Dulhe Raja	

=== 2000s ===
Year	Photos of winners	Actor	Role(s)	Film	Ref.
2000 (45th)		Govinda ‡	Monu	Haseena Maan Jaayegi	
2000 (45th)		Anil Kapoor	Lakhan Khurana	Biwi No.1	
2000 (45th)		Johnny Lever	Galer Mehndi	Anari No.1	
2000 (45th)		Salman Khan	Prem Mehra	Biwi No.1	
2000 (45th)		Shah Rukh Khan	Raj Babulal Rai a.k.a. Baadshah	Baadshah	
2001 (46th)		Paresh Rawal ‡	Baburao Ganpatrao Apte "Babu Bhaiya"	Hera Pheri	
2001 (46th)		Anupam Kher	Vicky Nath	Dulhan Hum Le Jayenge	
2001 (46th)		Govinda	Raju Sachdeva	Kunwara	
2001 (46th)		Johnny Lever	Gopal Ahuja	Kunwara	
2001 (46th)		Johnny Lever	Choti / Pappu Junior	Phir Bhi Dil Hai Hindustani	
2002 (47th)		Saif Ali Khan ‡	Sameer Mulchandani	Dil Chahta Hai	
2002 (47th)		Govinda	Veeru / Raju Coolie	Jodi No.1	
2002 (47th)		Govinda	Raj Malhotra	Kyo Kii... Main Jhuth Nahin Bolta	
2002 (47th)		Johnny Lever	Bhanu Pradhan	Ajnabee	
2002 (47th)		Paresh Rawal	O. P. Yadav	Yeh Teraa Ghar Yeh Meraa Ghar	
2003 (48th)		Paresh Rawal ‡	Manilal Patel	Awara Paagal Deewana	
2003 (48th)		Govinda	Raj Oberoi / Bobdeya Dada	Akhiyon Se Goli Maare	
2003 (48th)		Johnny Lever	Darshan Bhatt	Humraaz	
2003 (48th)		Mahesh Manjrekar	Raja "Bali" Yadav	Kaante	
2003 (48th)		Paresh Rawal	Illyaas	Aankhen	
2004 (49th)		Sanjay Dutt ‡	Murli Prasad Sharma a.k.a. Munna Bhai	Munna Bhai M.B.B.S.	
2004 (49th)		Boman Irani	Jagdish Chandra "JC" Asthana	Munna Bhai M.B.B.S.	
2004 (49th)		Johnny Lever	Chelaram Sukhwani	Koi... Mil Gaya	
2004 (49th)		Paresh Rawal	John "Johnny" D’Souza	Fun2shh... Dudes in the 10th Century	
2004 (49th)		Paresh Rawal	Radheshyam Tiwari	Hungama	
2005 (50th)		Saif Ali Khan ‡	Karan Kapoor	Hum Tum	
2005 (50th)		Akshay Kumar	"Wicked" Sunny	Mujhse Shaadi Karogi	
2005 (50th)		Arshad Warsi	Lucky Bhalla	Hulchul	
2005 (50th)		Boman Irani	Yogendra "Yogi" Agarwal	Main Hoon Na	
2005 (50th)		Paresh Rawal	Kishan "Murari" Chand	Hulchul	
2006 (51st)		Akshay Kumar ‡	Makrand "Mac" Godbhole	Garam Masala	
2006 (51st)		Anil Kapoor	Kishan Singhania	No Entry	
2006 (51st)		Javed Jaffrey	Jaggu Yadav a.k.a. Crocodile Dundee	Salaam Namaste	
2006 (51st)		Rajpal Yadav	Laxman Singh	Waqt: The Race Against Time	
2006 (51st)		Salman Khan	Prem Khanna	No Entry	
2007 (52nd)		Arshad Warsi ‡	Sarkeshwar (a.k.a. Circuit)	Lage Raho Munna Bhai	
2007 (52nd)		Chunky Pandey	Rana Jang Bahadur	Apna Sapna Money Money	
2007 (52nd)		Paresh Rawal	Baburao Ganpatrao Apte "Babu Bhaiya"	Phir Hera Pheri	
2007 (52nd)		Sharman Joshi	Laxman Prasad Sharma	Golmaal: Fun Unlimited	
2007 (52nd)		Tusshar Kapoor	Lucky Gill	Golmaal: Fun Unlimited	

== See also ==
- Filmfare Awards
- Bollywood
- Cinema of India
