= Anwar Ali (actor) =

Indian film actor and producer

- Born: 10 March 1944 (age 82); Bombay, Bombay Presidency, British India
- Occupations: Actor and producer
- Spouse: Mona Mathur Ali
- Children: 1
- Father: Mumtaz Ali
- Family: Ali-Amrohi family
- Website: www.bombaytogoa.in

Anwar Ali is an Indian film producer and actor. He is the younger brother of India's ace comedian Mehmood Ali. Ali started his career as an actor, starred in many movies in the era of 70's before he turned producer.

== Early and personal life ==
Anwar Ali was the youngest born in a family of 4 brothers and 4 sisters to Mumtaz Ali, who was famous as a dancer and character-artist in films from the 1940s era with his own dance troupe "Mumtaz Ali Nites". His brother Mehmood was an established comedian, while his sister Minoo Mumtaz was a dancer and actor in the movies.

Anwar Ali met Esko, his then-girlfriend, and they later married. After their marriage ended in divorce, Anwar Ali married Mona Mathur.

He married Mona Mathur Ali and has a son by the name Akaar Ali. Mona Ali had written a book "Amitabh And I Memoirs: Anwar Ali" in 2004 as a tribute to the friendship between Amitabh and Anwar Ali.

== Early career ==
He made his debut in the movie Sadhu Aur Shaitaan in 1968. His first major role was in the K. A. Abbas's film Saat Hindustani, which was also the debut movie for Amitabh Bacchan. He then worked in many movies like Wafaa, Albela, Caravan, Parwana, Bansi Birju, Manzil and Sabse Bada Rupaiya. He also played the memorable role of the driver "Rajesh" in the iconic movie Bombay to Goa, where Mehmood played the role of conductor "Khanna". Throughout his acting career, he has played all roles from villain to hero to comedian.

== Later career ==
He co-produced the super-hit Kunwaara Baap; the blockbuster hit Khud-Daar starring his best friend Amitabh Bachhan; and the critically acclaimed Kaash, directed by Mahesh Bhatt.

In 2014 being his elder brother Mehmood's 10th death anniversary, Anwar Ali and his family, under Bandwagon Entertainment, have flagged off a tribute to him on radio and TV and held a retrospective of his films. A week-long screening of the legendary comedian's popular film, Bombay to Goa in Mumbai city.

== See also ==
- Mehmood Ali Family
- Mehmood Ali
- Minoo Mumtaz
- Lucky Ali
- List of Hindi film clans
