= Baby Madhuri =

Indian actress (died 1993)

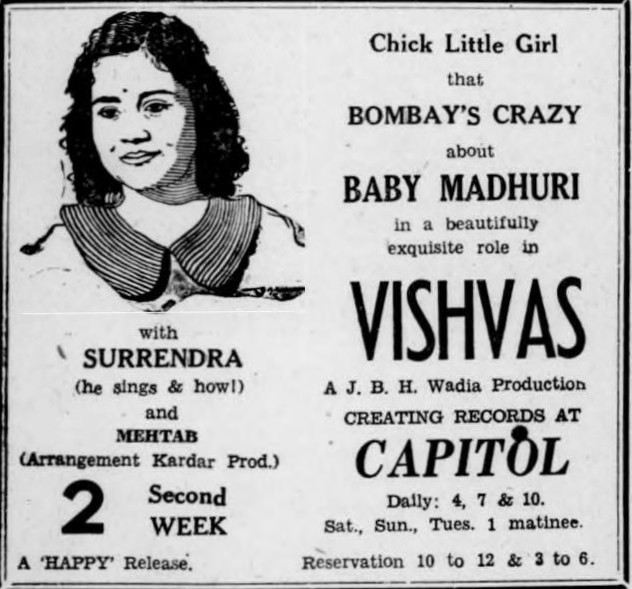
- Madhuri on a newspaper advertisement of Vishvas (1943)
- Born: Mah Laqa; 1936 or 1937
- Died: 20 January 1993 (aged 56–57); Bombay, Maharashtra
- Other name: Madhu Kumari
- Occupation: Actress
- Years active: 1940–1963
- Spouse(s): Mehmood (m. 1953; div. 1967) Kishore Sharma
- Children: 4
- Relatives: Khurshid Jr. (sister); Meena Kumari (sister); Mehmood Ali family (by first marriage)

Mah Laqa (1936 or 1937 – 20 January 1993), also known as Madhu Kumari, was an Indian actress who worked primarily as a child artist in Hindi films during the 1940s. She began her career at the age of three with Sandesha (1940), under the screen name Baby Madhuri, and became one of the prominent child stars of the period, earning comparisons with Shirley Temple. Her notable films included Muqabala (1942), Vishvas (1943) and Bachpan (1945).

Madhuri was the younger sister of actresses Khurshid Jr. and Meena Kumari. She was initially married to actor Mehmood, with whom she had four sons, including Lucky Ali and Macky Ali. She later married lawyer Kishore Sharma and died in Bombay on 20 January 1993.

== Personal life and death ==
Madhuri was born as Mah Laqa to the music director Master Ali Bux and Bengali actress and dancer Iqbal Begum. Her father was a Sunni Muslim, while Begum was originally a Christian who converted to Islam post-marriage. Madhuri was nicknamed Madhu and was the couple's youngest child; her elder sisters were actresses Khurshid Jr. and Meena Kumari (1933–1972). Madhuri studied up to the second standard at the English High School in Dadar but did not continue her formal education because of her early career in films.

Madhuri married actor Mehmood Ali in a private nikah ceremony on 4 September 1953. They had four sons: Masood (born 1954), Maqsood (also known as Lucky, born 1958), Maqdoom (also known as Macky, born 1960), and Masoom (born 1961). According to authors Hanif Zaveri and Mohan Deep, the marriage was troubled by Madhuri's extramarital affair with lawyer Kishore Sharma.

Madhuri and Mehmood divorced in 1967. She subsequently married Sharma, who had served as Meena Kumari's lawyer and, for a period, as her personal manager.

Madhuri died in Bombay on 20 January 1993.

== Career ==
Madhuri was discovered by director Nazir of Hind Pictures when she was three years old. Impressed by her potential, Nazir consulted her parents and cast her in Sandesha (1940), marking her acting debut. The film was a drama centered on Hindu–Muslim unity, and Madhuri's performance as Nazir's estranged daughter led critic Baburao Patel to describe her as "certainly a star of the future".

She subsequently played younger versions of Fearless Nadia's characters in Muqabala and The Jungle Princess, both released in 1942. Madhuri further appeared in Ekta (1942), the first Sindhi-language film in Indian cinema. She was also part of the Hindi cast of Mahatma Vidur (1943), a bilingual Hindi-Marathi saint film directed by P. Y. Altekar.

Madhuri received further positive reviews for her performance in Homi Wadia's Vishvas (1943), in which Mehtab played her mother. Patel praised her as "perhaps the sweetest child artiste recently seen on the Indian screen", describing her as "sparkling and precocious" and noting that she "steals every scene from her elders". Advertisements for the film in The Bombay Chronicle promoted Madhuri as "India's Shirley Temple" and "Chick Little Girl that Bombay's Crazy about". Contemporary journalist R. A. Shaikh similarly described her as one of India's leading child stars, writing that she was "acclaimed as the best among the baby artists" and could "safely be compared to any baby actress of Hollywood". Shaikh also reported that she had received "numerous cups and medals" for her role in Vishvas.

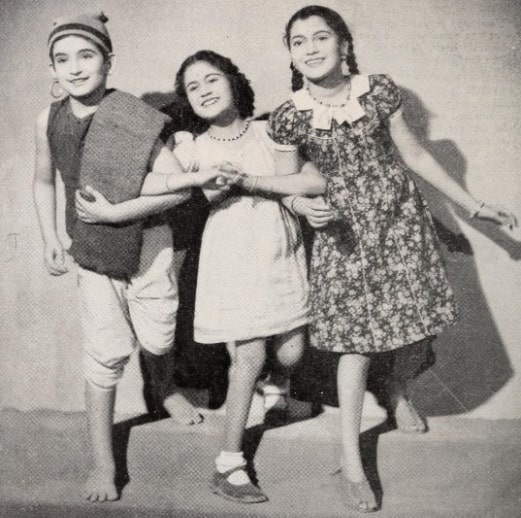
Madhuri (mid) with Shashi Kapoor (left) in Bachpan (1945)

Wadia subsequently directed Madhuri in Bachpan (1945), a social film built around her role. She played Madhu, a girl estranged from her grandfather (Mazhar Khan) who is forced to become the companion of a wealthy disabled girl. Her later roles included Nai Maa (1946) and Veer Babruwahan (1950), in which she appeared opposite Shashi Kapoor, then also a child actor.

Madhuri later returned to films in the early 1960s in adult roles. She appeared opposite her then-husband Mehmood in Manzil (1960) and alongside her sister Meena Kumari in Kinare Kinare (1963). According to Hanif Zaveri, however, Madhuri failed to attract significant attention with these roles.

== Filmography ==
Year	Title	Role	Ref.
1940	Sandesha	Madhuri	
1942	The Jungle Princess		
1942	Muqabala	Young Madhuri/Rani	
1942	Ekta		
1943	Vishvas	Madhuri	
1943	Andhera		
1943	Mahatma Vidur		
1943	Paraya Dhan		
1945	Bachpan	Madhu	
1946	Nai Maa		
1950	Veer Babruwahan		
1960	Manzil		
1963	Kinare Kinare	Malti	
