= Arun Bhatt =

Indian film director and producer

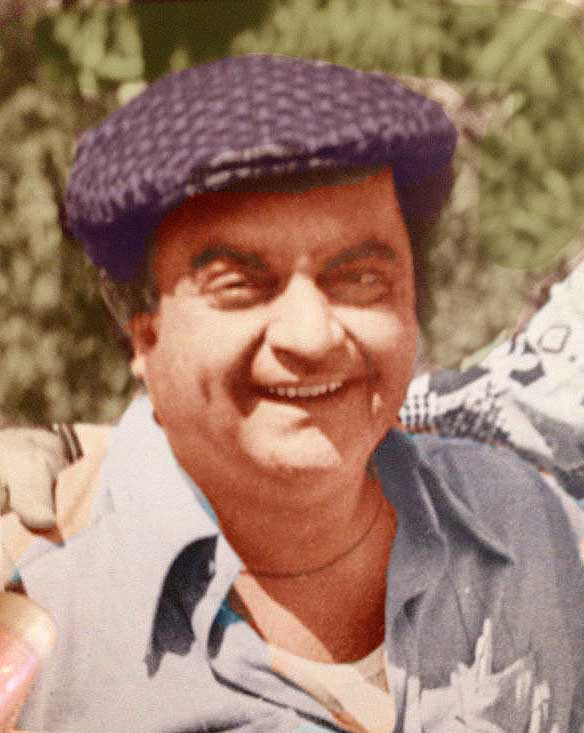

Arun Bhatt (1934–2001) was an Indian film director and producer active in Hindi and Gujarati cinema during the 1970s and 1980s.

== Biography ==
Arun Bhatt was born on 26 September 1934. He was the eldest son of the movie producer and director Vijay Bhatt, the founder of Prakash Pictures.

== Career ==
Bhatt started his career as an assistant to his father. In the early 1960s he made short films and documentaries as "Vijay Films", a production company started by Bhatt and his brother-in-law Kishore Vyas. He produced several documentary films for the Government of Gujarat.

In 1971, he founded Vijay Films International. His first film was Verno Vaaras, a dramatization of a folk tale in Gujarati, starring Arvind Joshi and Usha Solanki. Later, he made Vardaan in Hindi with Vinod Mehra, Reena Roy and Mehmood. Mehmood received a Filmfare Award for his role as a Gujarati businessman.

In May 1977, the Gujarati film Maa Baap was released, and ran for more than 25 weeks in cinemas, a so-called "Silver Jubilee". Throughout the 1980s, Bhatt produced several Gujarati films, including Mota Ghar Ni Vahu which was also a Silver Jubilee, Lohi Ni Sagaai, Ghar Ghar Ni Vaat, and Hiro Ghoghe Jai Aavyo.

In Hindi, Bhatt directed Ghar Jamai for producer Rajkumar Shahbadi which starred Mithun Chakraborty, Varsha Usgaonkar and Kadar Khan, and Jawani Zindabad for Jay Mehta starring Aamir Khan, Farha and Kadar Khan.

Bhatt worked with music directors, such as Avinash Vyas, and his son Gaurang Vyas to write songs for his films.

== Awards ==
The documentaries Poet Saints of Gujarat and Industries in Gujarat, produced for the Government of Gujarat, won awards as Best Documentary Film 1962–63 and Second best Documentary Film 1962–63 respectively, from the Government of Gujarat.

Bhatt also won several awards from the Government of Gujarat for Best Director: for Pooja Na Phool, Sona Ni Jaal, Ghar Ghar Ni Vaat, Shetal Tara Oonda Pani and Lakhtar Ni Laadi Ne Vilayat No Var.

His last completed film Lakhtar Ni Laadi won 11 Gujarat State Awards including the Best Screenplay and Second Best Director Award.

== Death ==
Bhatt died on 17 April 2001, leaving his last Gujarati film, Rangaai Jaane Rangma, incomplete.

== Family ==
Bhatt's son, Chirantan Bhatt is a music composer working in Bollywood and in Telugu cinema.

== Filmography ==
Year	Title	Language	Category	Role	Producer
1962	Poet Saints of Gujarat	English	Documentary	Script, Direction	Govt. of Gujarat
1963	Industries in Gujarat	English	Documentary	Script, Direction	Govt. of Gujarat
1964	Land and People of Gujarat	English	Documentary	Script, Direction	Govt. of Gujarat
1975	Vardaan	Hindi	Feature film	Producer, director, Story, Screenplay	Vijay Films International
1976	Verno Waaras	Gujarati	Feature film	Producer, director, Story, Screenplay	Vijay Films International
1977	Maa Baap	Gujarati (released in Hindi in 1978)	Feature film	Producer, Story	Vijay Films International
1978	Mota Gharni Vahu	Gujarati	Feature film	Producer, director, Story	Vijay Films International
1979	Paarki Thaapan	Gujarati	Feature film	Director, Story	Bharat Films
1979	Navrang Chundadi	Gujarati	Feature film	Producer	Vijay Films International
1980	Lohini Saagai	Gujarati	Feature film	Producer, director, Story	Vijay Films International
1980	Via Viram Gaam	Gujarati	Feature film	Director, Story	Ninoo Films
1980	Saachu Sagpan	Gujarati	Feature film	Director, Story	Shilpika
1980	Sau Dada Sasuna To Ek Dado Vahu No	Gujarati	Feature film	Producer	Vijay Films International
1981	Hiro Ghoghe Jai Aavyo	Gujarati	Feature film	Producer, director	Vijay Films International
1981	Pankhi No Maalo	Gujarati	Feature film	Director, Story	Bharat Films
1982	Jugal Jodi	Gujarati	Feature film	Director, Story	Durga Pictures
1982	Mai Baap	Marathi	Feature film	Story	
1982	Dholi	Gujarati	Feature film	Story	
1983	Ghar Gharni Vaat	Gujarati	Feature film	Producer, director	Vijay Films International
1984	Pooja Na Phool	Gujarati	Feature film	Director, Story	Bharat Films
1984	Tejal Garasni	Gujarati	Feature film	Producer	Vijay Films International
1985	Sonani Jaal	Gujarati	Feature film	Director, Story	D.K.Films
1985	Odhun To Odhun Taari Chundadi	Gujarati	Feature film	Director, Story	Bharat Films
1986	Shetal Tara Oonda Paani	Gujarati	Feature film	Producer, director, Story	Vijay Films International
1987	Paaras Padamani	Gujarati	Feature film	Director	Bharat Films
1990	Jawani Zindabad	Hindi	Feature film	Director	Pranlal Mehta
1992	Ghar Jamai	Hindi	Feature film	Director	B.P.Shahbadi
1994	Katha Sarita	Gujarati	Tele-serial	Screenplay, Director	Admore Films
1998	Lakhtar Ni Laadi Ne Vilaayat No Var	Gujarati	Feature film	Director, Story, Screenplay	Ram Rishi Productions
