= Macky Ali =

Indian actor

- Born: Maqdoom Ali; 1967; Bangalore, India
- Died: 31 August 2002 (aged 34–35); Bangalore, India
- Other name: Maikki
- Occupation: Actor
- Parents: Mehmood Ali (father); Mah Laqa (mother)
- Relatives: Lucky Ali (brother); Meena Kumari (maternal aunt); Minoo Mumtaz (paternal aunt)
- Family: Ali-Amrohi family

Macky Ali (born Maqdoom Ali) was an Indian actor. He was the third son of India's ace comedian Mehmood Ali and the younger brother of singer Lucky Ali.

== Early and personal life ==
Ali was the third of eight children of the popular Bollywood actor, Mehmood. His mother, actress Mah Laqa, was part Bengali and part Pathan, the younger sister of the popular Indian actress of the 1960s, Meena Kumari. The Bollywood actress and dancer, Minoo Mumtaz, was his paternal aunt.

== Career ==
Macky Ali made his debut as a child artiste in Kunwara Baap (1974 film). Macky, who was afflicted with polio since birth, had starred in the film directed by his father, who drew a lot from Macky's life story and struggle during the making of the film. Mehmood made the film for awareness of the disease. The film had special appearances from actors Sanjeev Kumar, Vinod Mehra, Amitabh Bachchan, Dharmendra, Vinod Khanna, Hema Malini, Dara Singh, Lalita Pawar, Yogita Bali and Mukri. Music composer Rajesh Roshan was introduced with this film.

Macky Ali also acted in the 1978 movie Ek Baap Chhe Bete, starring his father along with all his brothers. He also made an appearance in the music video album "Yaro sab dua karo" and subsequently came out with his own album "Shayad".

Macky left with his bags and ran away from his home between 1984 and 1989. His whereabouts were unknown to his father for 5 years.

== Death ==
Macky died on the way to the Mumbai Airport from a cardiac arrest on 31 August 2002 at the age of 35.

== Filmography ==
Year	Title	Role	Notes
1974	Kunwara Baap	Hindustan	Uncredited
1978	Ek Baap Chhe Bete	Macky	
1998	Tirchhi Topiwale	In Altaf Raja Song	(final film role)

== See also ==
- Mehmood Ali Family
- Minoo Mumtaz
- List of Hindi film clans
