= Mahatma Vidur =

- Directed by: Parshwanath Yeshwant Altekar
- Starring: Durga Khote; Raja Sandow P.K. Vishnupant Pagnis
- Release date: 1943
- Country: India
- Language: Hindi

Mahatma Vidur is a Bollywood mythological film based on the life of Vidura. It was directed by Parshwanath Yeshwant Altekar and released in 1943.

== Cast ==
- Durga Khote
- Raja Sandow P.K.
- Vishnupant Pagnis
- Baby Madhuri
