= Vardaan =

- Directed by: Arun Bhatt
- Starring: Vinod Mehra; Reena Roy; Mehmood; Om Prakash
- Music by: Kalyanji-Anandji
- Release date: 1975
- Country: India
- Language: Hindi

Vardaan is a 1975 Hindi movie directed by Arun Bhatt. The film stars Vinod Mehra, Reena Roy, Mehmood, Om Prakash & Others.

== Plot ==
After being thrown out of his house by his father, the smuggler Sunder is forced to live a simple life and in doing so manages to reform himself and become the good son that his father always dreamed of. Or so it seems.

== Cast ==
- Vinod Mehra as Mahesh Sharma
- Reena Roy as Lata
- Mehmood as Nandlal
- Om Prakash as Banwari Sharma
- Urmila Bhatt as Janki Sharma
- Chandrashekhar as Chaudhary Sahib

== Music ==
The music of the film was composed by Kalyanji–Anandji.

No.	Title	Singer(s)	Length
1.	"Dekho Dekho Dil Ka Taufa"	Lata Mangeshkar
2.	"Dialogue Song Shanth Ho Ja Hoshiyar Rahena Khabardar Rahena"	Mehmood
3.	"Hey Girdhari Krishna Murari (Part 1)"	Mahendra Kapoor
4.	"Hey Girdhari Krishna Murari (Part 2)"	Mahendra Kapoor
5.	"Jamuna Ke Tat Pe Maari Najariya"	Kanchan, Om Prakash, Manna Dey
6.	"Kuch Log Yahan Par Aise Hain"	Mohammed Rafi

== Awards ==
- Filmfare Best Comedian Award for Mehmood
