= Kinare Kinare =

- Poster
- Directed by: Chetan Anand
- Written by: Nyaya Sharma (dialogues)
- Screenplay by: Chetan Anand
- Story by: Nyaya Sharma
- Produced by: Nyaya Sharma
- Starring: Dev Anand; Meena Kumari; Chetan Anand; Sunder; Kammo; Madhu; Ravikant
- Cinematography: V. Ratra
- Edited by: K. Nanda
- Music by: Jaidev
- Production company: Apollo Arts
- Release date: 1963
- Country: India
- Language: Hindi

Kinare Kinare (transl. Along the shore) is a 1963 Indian Hindi-language film directed by Chetan Anand, who also plays a pivotal role. The film stars Dev Anand and Meena Kumari.

== Plot ==
Kamal, a fugitive who arrives at a village close to Bombay, saves a woman named Neelu, the daughter of a zamindar, from a bunch of goons. Neel falls in love with Kamal immediately, much to the chagrin of the estate caretaker, Puran, who is secretly in love with Neelu himself. Impressed with his bravery, the Zamindar gets Kamal employed as the new manager of the estate. Kamal too, reciprocates Neelu's feelings for him, but he feels he cannot and should not keep his true identity hidden. Hence, he leaves behind a confessional letter for Neelu and leaves the estate to find refuge in Bombay. Puran discovers the letter, but does not reveal its contents to Neelu. In Bombay, Kamal is joined by another fellow refugee Mithu (Sunder). Kamal also happens to save another couple from rowdies there too. This not only helps Kamal find employment, but also makes him the love interest of Lala's (Ravikant) wife (Kammo).

Back in the village, Neelu is found suffering from a heart problem. The duo go for treatment to Bombay, where the doctor they fix an appointment with advises a trip to Switzerland for further treatment. Neelu is reluctant, but is bolstered after meeting Kamal again. The two profess love and commitment to one another. Neelu goes to Switzerland; Kamal tries his best to keep Lala's wife at bay; Puran returns his letter to Kamal telling him he did not reveal the contents to her. In the process of pulling a handkerchief, Kamal unconsciously drops the letter, which is shortly discovered by Lala's wife. Realising he is in love with someone else and not being able to bear the thought of losing him, she hands over the letter to Lala, who informs the police. Just as Kamal and Neelu are married, the police arrive at the scene. Then as suddenly as Kamal was arrested, he is immediately found to be innocent. Kamal returns only to discover Neelu had been kidnapped by the leader of the goons whom he had saved Neelu from earlier. He and Puran rescue Neelu, with the latter dying in the process.

== Cast ==
Adapted from The Hindu. and IMDb

- Dev Anand as Kamal
- Meena Kumari as Neelu
- Chetan Anand as Puran
- Kammo as Usha, Lala's wife (uncredited)
- Madhu as Nurse Malti (uncredited)
- Ragini as Bharatanatyam dancer (uncredited)
- Jagdish Raj as Doctor (uncredited)
- Ravikant as Lala (uncredited)
- Sukhdev as Dilawar (uncredited)
- Sunder as Mithoo Mithaiwala (uncredited)
- B.S. Thapa as Thakur Manohar (uncredited)

== Soundtrack ==
The music was composed by Jaidev while Nayaya Sharma wrote the lyrics. On the album, film critic Suresh Kohli of The Hindu called the composition "brilliant".

All lyrics are written by Nayaya Sharma; all music is composed by Jaidev.

| No. | Title | Singer(s) | Length |
|---|---|---|---|
| 1. | "Aaj Achanak Tut Gaye Kyun" | Lata Mangeshkar | 3:28 |
| 2. | "Har Aas Ashq Baar Hai" | Lata Mangeshkar | 3:41 |
| 3. | "Jab Gham-e-Ishq Satata Hai" | Mukesh | 2:38 |
| 4. | "Dekh Li Teri Khudai" | Talat Mahmood | 3:24 |
| 5. | "Chale Ja Rahe Hai Kinare Kinare" | Manna Dey | 3:02 |
| 6. | "Teri Tasveer Bhi Tujh Jaisi" | Mohammed Rafi | 4:32 |
| 7. | "Sulag Uthi Dil Ki Lagi Jalate Hain Paravaane" | Lata Mangeshkar | 2:38 |
| 8. | "Qadamon Men Samaa Ke Paravaane" | Asha Bhosle | 3:38 |
| 9. | "Maayaa Kaa Aanchal Jale Kaayaa Kaa Abhimaan" | Mohammed Rafi, Usha Mangeshkar | 4:28 |
| 10. | "O Mast Nazar Tu Chahe Agar" | Vinod Desai | 3:45 |
| 11. | "Chhaliyaa Teri Baaton Baaton Men" | Asha Bhosle | 3:07 |
| 12. | "Jathiswaram" | M. L. Vasanthakumari | 2:62 |

== Reception ==
Kohli wrote that the film was "a lame duck." He criticised Chetan Anand's performance, noting "he not only fails miserably but in an attempt to give himself more than necessary footage ruins whatever little impact the story, dialogue and lyrics could have."
