= Kasidre Kailasa =

- Title card
- Directed by: K. Janakiram
- Written by: Balamurugan
- Produced by: K Janakiram
- Starring: Rajkumar; Udaykumar; Vanisri; Pandari Bai
- Cinematography: K. Janakiram
- Edited by: P. Bhakthavathsalan
- Music by: Satyam
- Production company: Sriram Films
- Release date: 26 March 1971
- Running time: 154 min
- Country: India
- Language: Kannada

Kasidre Kailasa is a 1971 Indian Kannada-language film directed and produced by K. Janakiram. The film stars Rajkumar, Udaykumar, Vanisri and Pandari Bai. The musical score was composed by Satyam.

The film was remade in Hindi in 1976 as Sabse Bada Rupaiya, directed by S. Ramanathan, the brother of Kannada actor Shivaram. The 2021 Kannada film 1980 features a sequence where this movie is being telecast on the television. A dialogue by Udaykumar to Rajkumar, advertising not to blindly trust one's loved ones without understanding their intentions, is used as a technique of foreshadowing.

== Cast ==
- Dr. Rajkumar as Gopinath
- Udaykumar as Ramu
- Vanisri as Shakuntala
- Pandari Bai as Gowramma, Shakuntala's mother
- Narasimharaju as Muthu
- B. Jaya as Muthu's love interest
- Srinath as Gopinath's secretary
- Nagappa
- Bangalore Nagesh
- M. S. Sathya
- Jayaram
- Shyam
- Bharadwaj
- Ganapathi Bhat
- Comedian Guggu
- Mahadevappa
- B. N. Raju
- Kanchana
- Halam
- Saroja

== Soundtrack ==
The music was composed by Satyam with lyrics written by R. N. Jayagopal.

No.	Song	Singers	Lyrics	Length (m:ss)
1	"Gudiyalli Adagiha"	P. B. Sreenivas	R. N. Jayagopal	03:21
2	"O Makkale Ee Nadina"	P. B. Sreenivas	R. N. Jayagopal	04:19
3	"O Mugile Belmugile"	P. Susheela	R. N. Jayagopal	04:11
4	"Sarasakagali"	L. R. Eswari, S. P. Balasubrahmanyam	R. N. Jayagopal	03:32
