= Jawani Zindabad =

1990 film directed by Arun Bhatt

- Poster
- Directed by: Arun Bhatt
- Written by: Bhushan Vanmali
- Based on: Avale Nanna Hendthi by K. Prabhakar and S. Umesh
- Produced by: Jay Mehta; Pranlal Mehta (presenter)
- Starring: Aamir Khan; Farha Naaz
- Cinematography: H. Laxminarayan
- Edited by: R. Rajendran; Sanjay Ghosalkar; Rakesh Ahluwalia
- Music by: Anand Milind
- Production company: Prathima Films
- Release date: 17 August 1990
- Running time: 163 minutes
- Country: India
- Language: Hindi

Jawani Zindabad (transl. Long live youth) is an Indian romantic action film directed by Arun Bhatt. This film was released in 1990, starring Aamir Khan and Farha Naaz. It was released on 17 August 1990. The film was a remake of the Kannada film Avale Nanna Hendthi (1988).

== Plot ==
Shashi Sharma, Akbar, and a group of young people pledge never to give nor receive dowry in protest against the dowry system. Shashi had an older sister who lost her life being a victim of the dowry system. Acting against his mother's wishes, Shashi marries Sugandha Srivastav without asking for any dowry. He arranges his other sister, Rama's marriage with Ravi Verma, the son of Goverdhan and Shakuntala.

Goverdhan is a legislator and a very greedy man. As he does not get any dowry, he and his wife become quite upset, though Ravi is happy. Both want Ravi to remarry so that they can get dowry. Meanwhile, Rama becomes pregnant, and so the in-laws try to eliminate her at the earliest. Goverdhan gets Ravi transferred to Delhi. After sending him away, Goverdhan plans to kill Rama and make it look like an accident. But things do not turn out as he expects, and his wife gets badly burned, who has to be hospitalized. Taking this opportunity, Goverdhan blames Rama for attempting to kill Shakuntala and has her arrested. He also hires goons to kill Shashi. Shashi, along with Ravi, overcomes all obstacles after a fight with the goons and reaches the hospital with Ravi being seriously injured. Goverdhan becomes remorseful after seeing his injured son and asks for Rama's forgiveness. Rama, who has just given birth to a daughter, forgives him. Goverdhan too pledges that no one would ever take nor receive any dowry in his family.

== Cast ==
- Aamir Khan as Shashi Sharma
- Farha Naaz as Sugandha Srivastav
- Javed Jaffrey as Ravi Verma
- Rohini as Rama
- Kader Khan as Balmukut Mama Banarasi
- Rajesh Puri as Akbar, office colleague and friend of Shashi
- Utpal Dutt as MLA Goverdhan Verma
- Shobha Khote as Shakuntala Verma
- Satyen Kappu as Gopinath Srivastav.
- Asrani as Banarasi Son
- Upasana Singh as Rossie, Banarasi's daughter-in-law
- Chandrashekhar as Mr. Bhatnagar
- Mehmood Jr. as Raghu Pathak
- Viju Khote as Mr. Pathak
- Shail Chaturvedi as Minister
- Jagdish Raj as Police Inspector

== Soundtrack ==
#	Title	Singer(s)
1	"Husn Ishq Ki Yeh Kahani"	Mohammad Aziz, Anuradha Paudwal
2	"Calcutta Ho Ya Kashi"	Amit Kumar, Suresh Wadkar
3	"Meri Jaan Jao Na"	Amit Kumar, Sadhana Sargam
4	"Sun Sun Sun Mera Yaar"	Amit Kumar, Kavita Krishnamurthy
5	"Main Tujhe Dekhta Raha"	Udit Narayan, Sadhana Sargam
6	"Shor Shor Shor"	Udit Narayan
