= Sadhu Mirandal =

1966 film by A. Bhimsingh

- Theatrical release poster
- Directed by: Thirumalai–Mahalingam
- Screenplay by: A. Bhimsingh
- Story by: Usilai Somanathan
- Produced by: A. Bhimsingh
- Starring: Nagesh; T. R. Ramachandran
- Cinematography: G. Vittal Rao
- Edited by: A. Paul Durai Singham
- Music by: T. K. Ramamoorthy
- Production company: Sree Venkateswara Cinetone
- Distributed by: Sun Beam
- Release date: 14 April 1966
- Country: India
- Language: Tamil

Sadhu Mirandal (transl. If the meek are angered) is a 1966 Indian Tamil-language crime thriller film directed by the duo Thirumalai–Mahalingam. It was produced by A. Bhimsingh, who also wrote the screenplay based on a real incident about a bank official murdered for money by three people in a moving car. The film stars Nagesh and T. R. Ramachandran. Released on 14 April 1966, it became a critical and commercial success, and was later remade in Hindi by Bhimsingh as Sadhu Aur Shaitaan (1969).

== Cast ==
- Nagesh as the taxi driver
- T. R. Ramachandran as Pasupathy
- O. A. K. Thevar as Narasimhan
- Manorama as Karpagam
- Kalpana as Kalpana
- Kutty Padmini as the bank manager's daughter
- Master Prabhakar as the bank manager's son

== Production ==
On 13 November 1958 in Madras (now Chennai), Suryanarayana, a bank official, was murdered for money by his friend Narayana Swamy and associates Vijayakumar and Joginder, while travelling in Narayana Swamy's car after taking a large sum of cash from his bank's head office at Parry's Corner to his branch in T. Nagar. Vijayakumar and Narayana Swamy were apprehended, but Joginder escaped. This incident became known as the "Suryanarayana Murder Case", and inspired A. Bhimsingh to write a screenplay. He produced it under the banner Sree Venkateswara Cinetone as the film Sadhu Mirandal, which his assistants Thirumalai–Mahalingam directed. The story and dialogues were written by Usilai Somanathan. Art direction was handled by H. Shantaram, editing by A. Paul Durai Singham and cinematography by G. Vittal Rao. A. Veerappan also contributed to the script, but was not credited. It is the feature film debut of Master Prabhakar. The final length of the film was 3,996 metres (13,110 ft).

== Soundtrack ==
The soundtrack was composed by T. K. Ramamoorthy. Ramamoorthy earlier composed for films with M. S. Viswanathan (under the name Viswanathan–Ramamoorthy) and this was his first film as a solo composer. One song, "A for Apple... B for Biscuit...", written by Thanjai Vaanan and sung by A. L. Raghavan and L. R. Eswari, attained popularity, as did "Arulvaaye Nee Arulvaaye", sung by M. Balamuralikrishna. This song is set in the Carnatic raga Sindhu Bhairavi.

Track listing
No.	Title	Lyrics	Singer(s)	Length
1.	"Arulvaaye Nee Arulvaaye"	Alangudi Somu	M. Balamuralikrishna	3:36
2.	"Pattali Thozhilalarkalai"	Alangudi Somu	S. C. Krishnan, L. R. Eswari	7:54
3.	"A for Apple... B for Biscuit..."	Thanjai Vanan	A. L. Raghavan, L. R. Eswari, S. V. Ponnusamy, Sundar–Surendran, Lalitha	4:04
4.	"Nadakame Intha Ulagam"	Thanjai Vanan	A. L. Raghavan	6:45
Total length:				22:19

== Release and reception ==
Sadhu Mirandal was released on 14 April 1966, and was distributed by Sun Beam. The film became a commercial success, and received praise from Kalki for its innovative storyline and making.

== Bibliography ==
- Gahlot, Deepa (2015). "Sadhu Aur Shaitan". Take-2: 50 Films That Deserve a New Audience. India: Hay House. ISBN 978-93-84544-82-9.
- Pillai, Swarnavel Eswaran (2015). Madras Studios: Narrative, Genre, and Ideology in Tamil Cinema. SAGE Publications. ISBN 9789351501213.
