= Nandi Veendum Varika =

Nanni Veendum Varika
- Poster
- നന്ദി വീണ്ടും വരിക
- Directed by: P. G. Viswambharan
- Written by: Jagadish; Sreenivasan (dialogues)
- Screenplay by: Sreenivasan
- Produced by: M. Sunil Kumar
- Starring: Mammootty; Suresh Gopi; Urvashi; M. G. Soman; Sreenivasan
- Cinematography: Vipin Mohan
- Edited by: G. Murali
- Music by: Shyam
- Production company: SS Movie Production
- Distributed by: SS Movie Production
- Release date: 12 August 1986
- Country: India
- Language: Malayalam

Nanni Veendum Varika (transl. Thank you, please visit again) is a 1986 Indian Malayalam-language comedy film produced by M. Sunil Kumar under SS Movie Production, directed by P. G. Viswambharan and written jointly by Jagadish and Sreenivasan. It features an ensemble cast of Mammootty, Suresh Gopi, Urvashi, M. G. Soman and Sreenivasan in the lead roles. The cinematography was handled by Vipin Mohan. The film features original songs and score composed by Shyam.

The film revolves around Mohandas C. K. (Mammootty), a teacher who on being forced by his father (Sankaradi) joins the police force as a Sub-inspector. However, he is reluctant to become a police officer as he is scared and cowardly in nature. He gets his first posting in a village were corruption is rampant. The plot explores how he overcomes his cowardly nature and brings the corrupt Ananthan Nair (M. G. Soman) to justice.

The film was shot extensively in and around Ottasekharamangalam in Thiruvananthapuram district. Principal photography was done in 1-1.5 months. The film was released on 12 September 1986 on the occasion of Onam and was a commercial success. The film was among the commercially successful films in which Mammootty had starred in that year. However, the film has over the years acquired a cult following. The film was later remade into Tamil as Kavalukku Kettikaran.

== Plot ==
Mohandas is the son of Chathukutty, a police constable, who dreams of making him a sub-inspector of police. Mohandas, however, is happy as a teacher in a tutorial college, and does not wish to take up the job as he is a coward by nature. He tries to fail the written exam for SI selection, but his father uses his influence to get him selected and then emotionally blackmails him to join. After finishing his training, he joins a police station in a village where Ananthan Nair is a de facto king. Ananthan Nair owns all the big businesses and is a close friend of the police big wigs, with whose help he indulges in a number of nefarious activities including bootlegging. He also exploits the poor farmers in the region. When Balan opposes his actions, he gets Balan beaten up by his goons, and rapes Balan's wife, who subsequently commits suicide. When Mohandas arrives to take charge at the local police station, he initially sides with Ananthan Nair due to his cowardice. With the help of Damodaran, another school teacher, he overcomes his fear and proceeds to help the population and take action against Ananthan Nair.

== Cast ==
- Mammootty as Mohandas C. K.
- Suresh Gopi as Balan
- Urvashi as Devayani Teacher
- M. G. Soman as Ananthan Nair
- Sreenivasan as Damodharan
- Sankaradi as Chathukutty
- Sukumari as Madhavi
- Adoor Bhasi as Vishnu Nampoothiri
- Kuthiravattam Pappu as Mukundan
- Poojappura Ravi as Mathachan
- Jagannatha Varma
- Jagadish as Venu
- Thodupuzha Vasanthi as Ananthan Nair's wife
- K. P. A. C. Azeez as Right hand of Ananthan Nair
- Uma Bharani as Balan's wife

== Soundtrack ==
The music was composed by Shyam and the lyrics were written by Chunakkara Ramankutty.

No.	Song	Singers	Lyrics	Length (m:ss)
1	"Nishaagandhi Poothu Chirichu"	K. S. Chithra	Chunakkara Ramankutty	4:25
2	"Punishment Engum Punishment"	K. J. Yesudas, Chorus, C. O. Anto	Chunakkara Ramankutty	3:47

== Reception ==
The film was a commercial success
