= Jyoti Swaroop =

Indian filmmaker

- Died: 17 March 1991; Mysore, Karnataka, India
- Occupations: film director, screenwriter and producer

Jyoti Swaroop was an Indian film director, screenwriter and producer, who was one of the leading film directors in Hindi cinema of the 1960s and early 70s. His most well known films as a director include Parwana (1971) and Padosan (1968).

== Selected filmography ==
- Parwana (1971)
- Padosan (1968)
