= Minoo Mumtaz =

Indian actress (1942–2021)

- Born: Malikunnisa Ali; 26 April 1942; Bombay, Bombay Presidency, British India (present-day Mumbai, Maharashtra, India)
- Died: 23 October 2021 (aged 79); Toronto, Ontario, Canada
- Other names: Minoo, Meenu Mumtaz, Minu Mumtaz
- Occupations: Actress, Dancer
- Spouse: Sayeed Ali Akbar
- Children: 4
- Father: Mumtaz Ali
- Relatives: See Ali-Amrohi family

Minoo Mumtaz (born as Malikunnisa Ali; 26 April 1942 – 23 October 2021) was an Indian actress. She was the sister of India's ace comedian Mehmood and was part of the Mehmood Ali film family. Minoo Mumtaz appeared in many Hindi films of the 1950s and 1960s, mostly as a dancer and character actress.

== Early life ==
Born to Mumtaz Ali and in a family of four brothers and four sisters to Mumtaz Ali, who was famous as a dancer and character-artist in films from the 1940s era, with his own dance troupe "Mumtaz Ali Nites". Mumtaz Ali's career slumped due to his excessive drinking and his family fell on hard times, leading to his son Mehmood working as a child artist, and daughter Minoo Mumtaz to work as dancer in his stage shows and later in movies.

== Career ==
She was renamed as "Minoo" by none other than Meena Kumari, who is the sister-in-law of Mehmood. She started off as a stage dancer and later as dancer in many films of the 50s and 60s with her first film Sakhi Hateem. She also played the lead role opposite Balraj Sahni in Black Cat (1959). She can be seen in the song "Boojh Mera Kya Naam Re", from the movie C.I.D. (1956), as Dancer in Howrah Bridge (1958). She also appeared in Guru Dutt films such as Kaagaz Ke Phool (1959), Chaudhvin Ka Chand (1960) and Sahib Bibi Aur Ghulam (1962). She played key roles in Yahudi (1958), Taj Mahal (1963), Ghunghat (1960), Gharana (1961), Insan Jaag Utha (1959), Ghar Basake Dekho (1963), Gazal (1964), Sindbad, Alibaba, Aladdin, Jahan Ara (1964). The 1958 film Howrah Bridge, created a huge controversy because in this movie, Minoo Mumtaz was seen making onscreen romance with Mehmood who was her real blood brother. People were shocked to see the brother and sister in romantic role.

== Personal life ==
She married Syed Ali Akbar, a film director on 12 June 1963. The couple had three daughters Mehnaz, Shehnaz and Gulnaz and a son Ajaz. Minoo Mumtaz died on 23 October 2021 at the age of 79. She lived her last days in Canada.

== Filmography ==
| Year | Film | Character/Role | Notes |
|---|---|---|---|
| 1955 | Sakhi Hatim | Mermaid | |
| 1955 | Bara-Dari | | |
| 1955 | Ghar Ghar Mein Diwali | Village Dancer | |
| 1955 | Society | | |
| 1956 | Anjaan - Somewhere In Delhi | Chand | |
| 1956 | Bajrang Bali | | |
| 1956 | Bandhan | Dancer | |
| 1956 | C. I. D. | Dancer-Singer | |
| 1956 | Delhi Durbar | | |
| 1956 | Halaku | Dancer | |
| 1956 | Miss Coca-Cola | | |
| 1956 | Mr. Lambu | | |
| 1956 | Pocket Maar | Dancer-Singer | |
| 1957 | Aasha | Munni | |
| 1957 | Do Roti | Mohini | |
| 1957 | Dushman | Dancer | |
| 1957 | Ek Saal | Mary | |
| 1957 | Laxmi Pooja | | |
| 1957 | Mai Baap | Leela | |
| 1957 | Miss India | | |
| 1957 | Mohini | | |
| 1957 | Naya Daur | Dancer | |
| 1957 | Payal | Dolly | |
| 1957 | Perveen | | |
| 1957 | Ram Lakshman | | |
| 1957 | Sati Pariksha | Rajkumari / Maharani Mohana | |
| 1958 | Aakhri Dao | Maina | |
| 1958 | Adalat | Uncredited dancer | |
| 1958 | Aji Bas Shukriya | | |
| 1958 | Dilli Ka Thug | Dancer-Singer | |
| 1958 | Howrah Bridge | Dancer-Singer | |
| 1958 | Karigar | Mumtaz | |
| 1958 | Khazanchi | | |
| 1958 | Mr. Qartoon M. A. | | |
| 1958 | Yahudi | Ruth | |
| 1958 | Zindagi Ya Toofan | Firoza | |
| 1959 | Black Cat | Neeta Gupta | |
| 1959 | Chirag Kahan Roshni Kahan | Maya Verma | |
| 1959 | Duniya Na Mane | Kanchan | |
| 1959 | Ghar Ghar Ki Baat | | |
| 1959 | Insan Jaag Utha | Muniya | |
| 1959 | Jagga Daku | | |
| 1959 | Jagir | | |
| 1959 | Kaagaz Ke Phool | | |
| 1959 | Mohar | | |
| 1959 | Paigham | Chhelo | |
| 1959 | Qaidi No. 911 | Hotel Dancer and Singer | |
| 1960 | Basant | Mahuya | |
| 1960 | Bindya | Priyadarshini | |
| 1960 | Chaudhvin Ka Chand | Tameezan | |
| 1960 | Ghunghat | Saroj | |
| 1960 | Kala Aadmi | | |
| 1960 | Rangeela Raja | | |
| 1960 | Rikshawala | | |
| 1960 | Tu Nahin Aur Sahi | Reeta | |
| 1961 | Chhote Nawab | Mahnuma | |
| 1961 | Gharana | Ragini | |
| 1962 | Sahib Bibi Aur Ghulam | Jabba | |
| 1962 | Rangalya Ratri Asha | Kothewali | Marathi film |
| 1963 | Akeli Mat Jaiyo | Shobha alias Sundari | |
| 1963 | Faulad | Veena | |
| 1963 | Ghar Basake Dekho | Ganga Agnihotri | |
| 1963 | Taj Mahal | Gulbadan | |
| 1964 | Chitralekha | | |
| 1964 | Gazal | | |
| 1964 | Jahan Ara | Roshan Ara | |
| 1965 | Bombay Race Course | | |
| 1965 | Sindbad Alibaba And Aladdin | Zarina | |
| 1966 | Gaban | Zohra Jaan | |
| 1966 | Preet Na Jaane Reet | Rosie | |
| 1967 | Palki | | |
| 1968 | Nadir Shah | | |
| 1975 | Zameer | | |
| 1986 | Patton Ki Bazi | Store owner's wife | |

== Television ==
| Year | Show | Character/Role |
|---|---|---|
| 2002 | Chalo Chale Parades | (TV Series) |

== See also ==
- Mehmood Ali Family
- Mumtaz Ali
- Mehmood Ali
- Anwar Ali
- Lucky Ali
- List of Hindi film clans
