= Ginny Aur Johnny =

- Poster
- Directed by: Mehmood
- Produced by: Amarlal Chabria
- Starring: Mehmood; Baby Ginny; Amjad Khan; Helen; Hema Malini
- Music by: Rajesh Roshan
- Release date: 27 October 1976
- Country: India
- Language: Hindi

Ginny Aur Johnny (transl. Ginny and Johnny) is a 1976 Indian Hindi-language comedy-drama film. Produced by Amarlal Chabria and directed by Mehmood the film stars Mehmood, Amjad Khan, Helen, Rajesh Khanna, Hema Malini, Rishi Kapoor, Randhir Kapoor, Vinod Mehra, Nutan, Rakesh Roshan and Baby Ginny, who is Mehmood's own daughter. The film is based on 1973 American film Paper Moon.

== Plot ==
The story centres on Johnny, a man, and Ginny, a nine-year-old girl who is Mehmood's daughter. When Ginny's mother, Rosie, dies in an accident, Ginny is left alone. Johnny visits Rosie, and learns about her death during this time. The villagers therefore request that Johnny take Ginny to an orphanage in Ooty.

However, Johnny is a con man who visits places where someone has died. By taking their names, he sells holy books to the families. While travelling to Ooty, he continues this work. The journey is filled with beautiful slapstick moments and banter.

== Music ==
The film's music is by Rajesh Roshan, while all the songs are written by Majrooh Sultanpuri.

#	Title	Singer(s)
1	"Jab Tu Badi Ho Jayegi"	Kishore Kumar, Vijayta Pandit
2	"Johnny Ko Maine To Jaana Hai"	Kishore Kumar, Vijayta Pandit
3	"Sun Ginnya"	Kishore Kumar, Vijayta Pandit
4	"Come On Everybody"	Kishore Kumar
5	"Johnny Ko Maine To Jaana Hai (Sad)"	Kishore Kumar, Vijayta Pandit
6	"Kahoon Kya Tumse Apni Dastan"	Mohammed Rafi, Lata Mangeshkar

== Cast ==
- Mehmood as Johnny
- Baby Ginni as Ginni
- Amjad Khan as Gabbar Singh
- Helen as Johnny's girlfriend
- Rajesh Khanna as in a special appearance as the Inspector
- Bhushan Tiwari as
- Nutan as Rosie's sister
- Randhir Kapoor as Dabbu
- Vinod Mehra as a Mechanic
- Rishi Kapoor in a guest role
- Hema Malini as Rosie (Ginny's mother)
- Rakesh Roshan
- Preeti Ganguly as Sweety
- Imtiaz Khan as Inspector (brother of Gabbar Singh)
- Sunder
- Asit Sen as Hawaldaar
- Dev Kumar as Police Commissioner
- Mohan Choti
- Leela Mishra
- Shailendra Singh

== Production ==
Mehmood went to the United States to visit his in-laws, as he used to do annually. While there, he watched the American film Paper Moon, and decided to adapt it in Hindi with the title Ginny Aur Johnny.
