= Mehmood (actor) =

Indian film actor (1932–2004)

Mehmood Ali
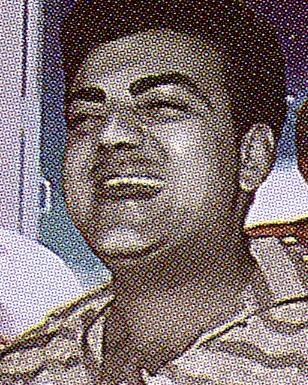
- Mehmood on 2013 stamp of India
- Born: 29 September 1932; Bombay, Bombay Presidency, British India
- Died: 23 July 2004 (aged 71); Dunmore, Pennsylvania, U.S.
- Occupations: Actor; singer; film producer; director
- Spouse(s): Madhu Kumari (m. 1953; div. 1967) Tracy Ali
- Children: 7, including Pucky Ali, Lucky Ali, Macky Ali, Ginny Ali
- Parent: Mumtaz Ali (father)
- Relatives: Meena Kumari (sister-in-law); see also Ali-Amrohi family
- Family: Mehmood Ali family

Mehmood Ali (29 September 1932 – 23 July 2004), popularly known simply as Mehmood, was an Indian actor, singer, director and producer, best known for playing comic, serious, emotional and versatile roles in Hindi films.

During his career spanning more than four decades, he worked in over 300 Hindi films and was known as Bollywood's Original Bhaijaan. Mehmood received 25 nominations for film awards, 19 for 'Best Performance in a Comic Role', while the awards started in 1954, awards for the best comedian category started only in 1967. Prior to that Mehmood also received 6 nominations for 'Best Supporting Actor'.

== Early life ==
Mehmood Ali was born on 29 September 1932. He was the second of the eight children, and eldest son to Latifunnisa and film and stage actor/dancer Mumtaz Ali, who was a huge star of the 1940s and 1950s cinema in Mumbai. Mehmood had an elder sister and six younger siblings. His sister, Minoo Mumtaz, was also a successful dancer and character actress in Bollywood movies. His youngest brother, Anwar Ali, is also an actor as well as a producer of such movies as Khud-daar and Kaash.

== Career ==
=== Early career ===
As a child, he worked in Bombay films like Kismet. He later had a number of odd jobs, selling poultry products and working as a driver for director P. L. Santoshi. Santoshi's son, Rajkumar Santoshi, would later cast him in the film Andaz Apna Apna (1994). Many of Mehmood's film songs were sung by Mohammad Rafi.

Mehmood would go on to perform small roles in films such as Do Bigha Zameen, C.I.D., and Pyaasa. He later began taking on larger roles.

He then ruled from late 50s to 70s as a Big Superstar, both as an actor and filmmaker. In the period from 1958-1979 he gave many hits, superhits and blockbusters as main lead, parallel lead, 2nd lead and supporting roles. And also did many Special Appearances & Cameos.

And during that period he gave break to many artists in the industry like - R.D. Burman, Rajesh Roshan, Aruna Irani, Amitabh Bachchan and many more.

=== Later career ===
In the 1980s, Mehmood's starts doing less movie and during that time other comedy actors like Jagdeep, Asrani, Paintal, Deven Verma and Kader Khan shot to prominence. Between 1990 and 1999, he made a handful of movies, but most of them were either shelved or made no impression. He acted as Johnny in Rajkumar Santoshi's Andaz Apna Apna (1994). It was his last well-known film.

== Personal life ==
Mehmood married Madhu Kumari in 1953; the two divorced in September 1967. The two had four children together, Masood "Pucky" Ali, Maqsood "Lucky" Ali, Maqdoom "Macky" Ali, and Masoon Ali. Mehmood would go on to marry his second wife, Tracy, and have three more children with her, Mansoor Ali, Manzoor Ali, and Latifunnissa "Ginny" Ali. Several of his children would go on to star in Mehmood related productions such as the 1976 film Ginny Aur Johnny, which starred his daughter Ginny and was based on the 1973 film Paper Moon.

== Death ==
On 23 July 2004, Mehmood died in his sleep in Pennsylvania, where he had gone for treatment of cardiovascular heart disease after suffering from poor health over several years. His fans were able to pay homage to him at Mehboob Studio in Bandra, Mumbai.

After the initial homage in Mumbai, his body was flown to Ali Estates, the family's 186-acre farmhouse in Yelahanka, on the outskirts of Bangalore A funeral procession was held there on 29 July 2004, attended by close relatives, friends, and several film personalities along with local mourners. Though relatively low-key in accordance with his wishes, the ceremony drew tributes from many senior actors and filmmakers who acknowledged Mehmood as a giant of Indian comedy whose influence extended well beyond his screen presence. The estate, which had been used as a set for many of Mehmood's films, also houses a private family graveyard. He was buried in a modest, unmarked grave at the foot of the white tomb of his father, Mumtaz Ali. His son Macky, who died in 2002, is also buried next to him.

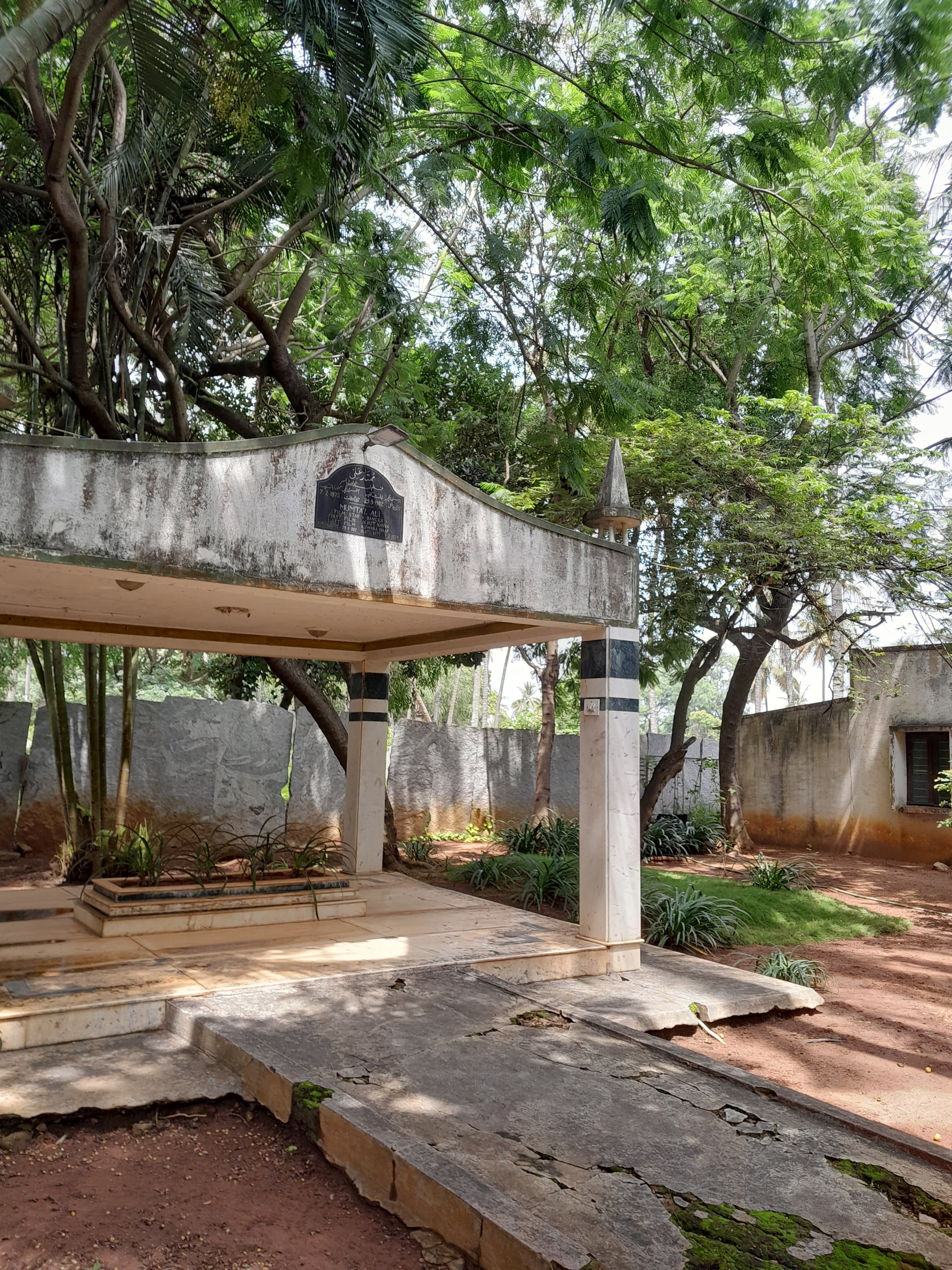
Tomb of Mumtaz Ali with unmarked graves of his son Mehmood Ali and grandson Macky in the background.

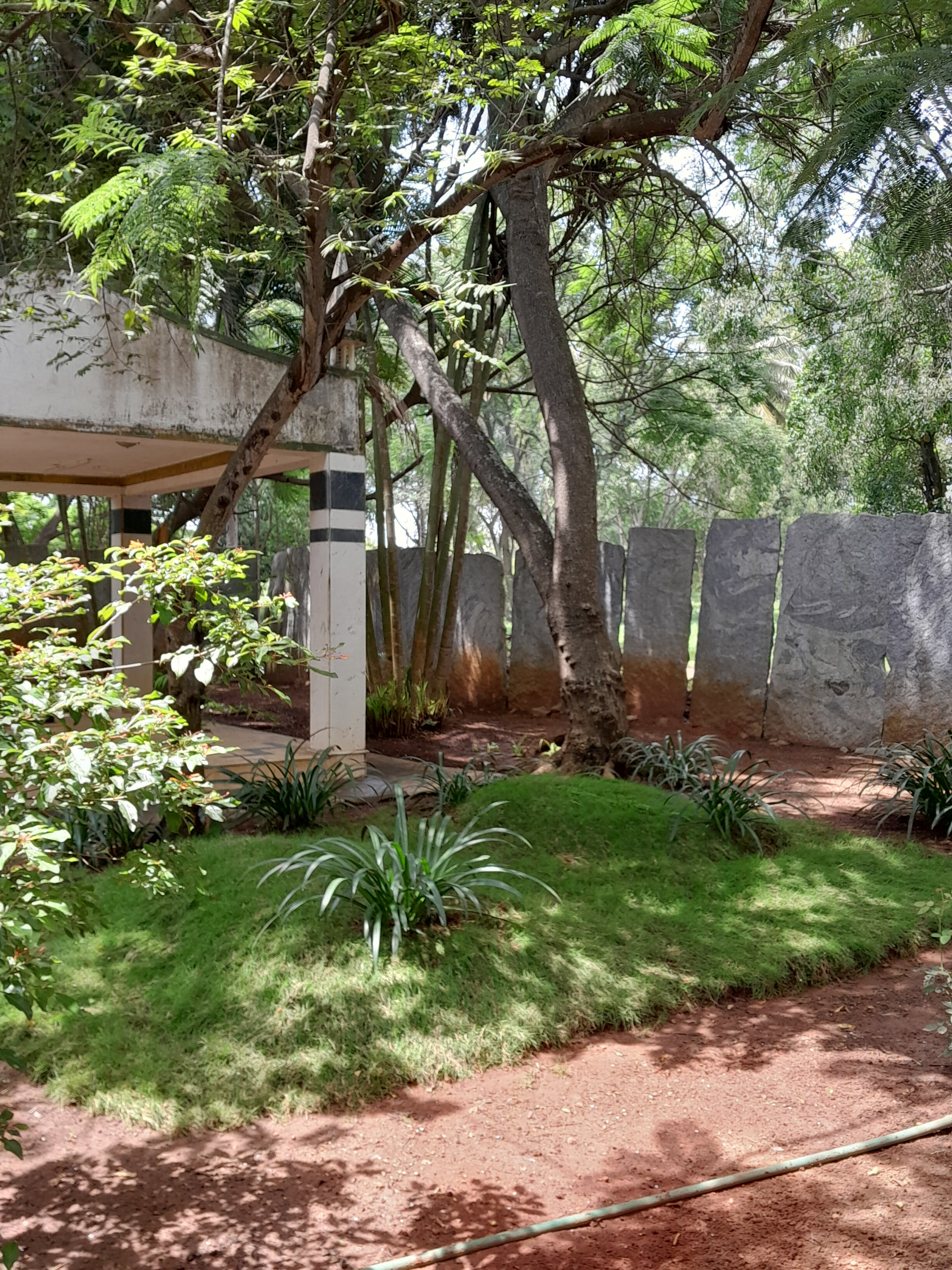
Unmarked graves of Mehmood and Macky Ali at Ali Estates, Yelahanka, Bangalore.

== Legacy ==
One of Mehmood's most enduring legacies is his early support for Amitabh Bachchan, who would go on to become one of the most iconic figures in Indian cinema. At a time when leading producers hesitated to cast Bachchan in prominent roles, Mehmood offered him the lead in Bombay to Goa, marking Bachchan's first major solo project. The film featured a high-impact bus crash sequence, and Mehmood was reportedly taken aback by the raw intensity Amitabh displayed in the action scene – a performance that foreshadowed his future rise as the "Angry Young Man." Bachchan would later refer to Mehmood as his "godfather," crediting him with giving him a crucial break at a turning point in his career.

Mehmood's personal life also reflected his wide social reach. Through marriage, he was connected to the Nawab of Arcot's family, one of the oldest Muslim noble lineages in India, known for their longstanding ties to Hyderabad and Madras aristocracy.

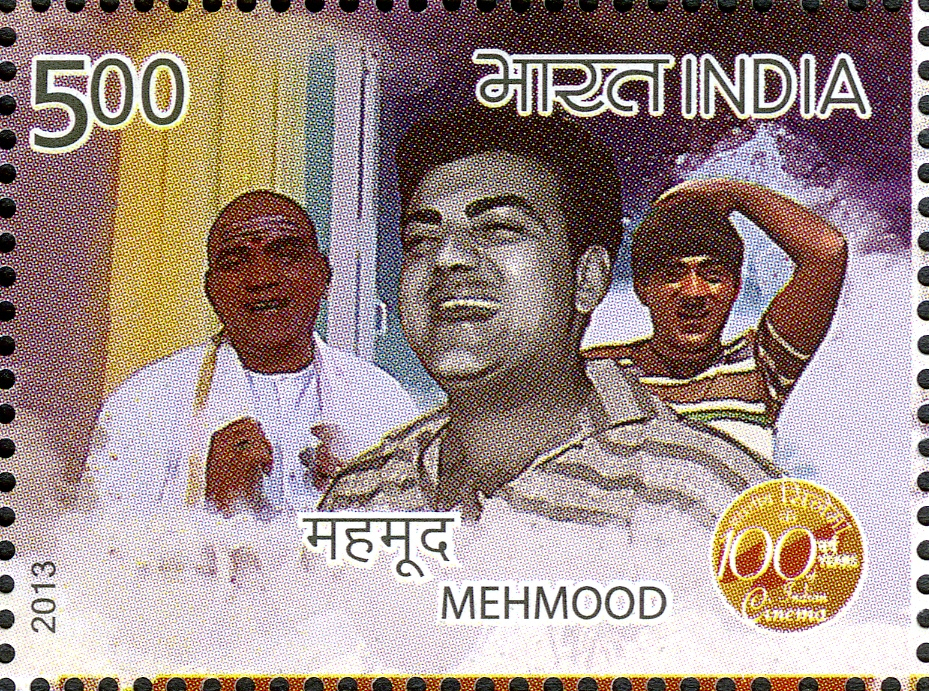
Mehmood on a 2013 stamp of India

Satish Kaushik has credited Mehmood as inspiring him to become an actor. In 2013 Mehmood was featured on a stamp of India. In 2022, Mehmood was placed in Outlook India's "75 Best Bollywood Actors" list.

== Filmography ==
Year	Film	As	Notes
1943	Kismet	Young Shekhar	Debut film
1945	Sanyasi	Banke	
1951	Nadaan	Bus Conductor	
1952	Maa		
1953	Do Bigha Zamin	Peanuts Seller	
1954	Nastik	Vinod's Henchman	
1954	Naukri	Pickpocket	
1956	C.I.D.	Sher Singh	
1956	Funtoosh		
1956	Mem Sahib	Hardeep Kumar	
1957	Baarish	Ramu's Neighbour	
1957	Ek Saal	Doctor	
1957	Pyaasa	Vijay's Brother	
1958	Howrah Bridge		
1958	Parvarish	Ramesh Singh	
1959	Chhoti Bahen	Mahesh	Filmfare Award for Best Supporting Actor [Nominated]
1959	Kaagaz Ke Phool	Special Appearance	In the song "San San San Woh Chali Hawaa"
1959	Qaidi No. 911	Anand	
1960	Kanoon	Vijay Prasad	
1960	Mian Biwi Razi		
1960	Manzil	Shankar Paanwala	
1960	Shriman Satyawadi	Kishore	
1961	Chhote Nawab	Chhote Nawab	Mehmood provided famous music director R. D. Burman his first break in this film.
1961	Pyase Panchhi	Mahesh	
1961	Sasural	Mahesh	Filmfare Award for Best Supporting Actor [Nominated]
1962	Aarti	Kumar	
1962	Dil Tera Deewana	Anokhe	Filmfare Award for Best Supporting Actor
1962	Rakhi	Kasturi	Filmfare Award for Best Supporting Actor [Nominated]
1963	Bharosa	Platform M. P. P. S.	
1963	Ghar Basake Dekho	Sunder	Nominated for the Filmfare Award for Best Supporting Actor.
1963	Godaan	Gobar	
1963	Grahasti	Jaggu	
1963	Hamrahi	Mahesh	
1963	Kahin Pyaar Na Ho Jaaye		
1964	Beti Bete	Mahesh 'Munna'	
1964	Chitralekha	Brahmachari Shwetant	
1964	Mama Ji	Madari	Punjabi Punjabi Movie
1964	Sanjh Aur Savera	Prakash	
1964	Shabnam	Khan Mustafa / Zingarro	
1964	Ziddi	Mahesh	
1964	Zindagi	Jaggu	
1965	Arzoo	Mamdhu Mumtaz Ali	
1965	Bahu Beti	Mahesh	
1965	Bhoot Bungla	Mohan Kumar	Produced and directed by Mehmood
1965	Do Dil	Bahadur Singh	
1965	Gumnaam	Butler	Filmfare Award for Best Supporting Actor [Nominated]
1965	Johar-Mehmood in Goa	Rahim Mohammed Salauddin	
1965	Kaajal	Bhola	
1965	Namasteji		
1965	Neela Aakash	Madanlal	
1966	Biwi Aur Makan	Sitaram Pandey	
1966	Daadi Maa	Mahesh	
1966	Love in Tokyo	Mahesh	
1966	Mohabbat Zindagi Hai	Manglu	
1966	Pati Patni	Pashupati	
1966	Pyar Kiye Jaa	Atma	Filmfare Award for Best Performance in a Comic Role
1967	Chandan Ka Palna	Mahesh Chandra Mukherjee	
1967	Gunahon Ka Devta		
1967	Mehrban	Madhu	
1967	Patthar ke Sanam	Hariya Kumar	
1968	Ankhen	Mehmood	
1968	Do Kaliyan	Mahesh	
1968	Izzat	Mahesh	
1968	Neel Kamal	Girdhar Gopal Agarwal	
1968	Padosan	Master Pillai	with Sunil Dutt, Saira Banu and Kishore Kumar. Mehmood jointly produced this film with N. C. Sippy
1968	Sadhu Aur Shaitaan	Bajrang	Filmfare Award for Best Performance in a Comic Role [Nominated]
1969	Badi Didi	Madan	
1969	Meri Bhabhi	Shambhu	Filmfare Award for Best Performance in a Comic Role [Nominated]
1969	Tumse Achha Kaun Hai ?	Mahesh	
1969	Waris	CID Inspector Rajan / Ram Kumar No. 3 & his mother (Double Role)	Filmfare Award for Best Performance in a Comic Role
1970	Humjoli	Shivram / Balram / Parshuram (Triple Role)	Filmfare Award for Best Performance in a Comic Role [Nominated]
1970	Jawab	Bajrangi	
1970	Mastana	Satya	Credit as Mahmood
1971	Johar Mehmood in Hong Kong	Mahesh	
1971	Lakhon Me Ek	Bhola	
1971	Main Sunder Hoon	Sunder	Filmfare Award for Best Performance in a Comic Role [Nominated]
1971	Naya Zamana	Mahesh	
1971	Mere Apne		
1971	Paras	Munna Sarkar	Filmfare Award for Best Performance in a Comic Role
1972	Bombay To Goa	Khanna (Bus Conductor)	Filmfare Award for Best Performance in a Comic Role [Nominated]
1972	Garam Masala	Rajkumar Suraj Kumar	
1973	Do Phool	Pavitra Kumar Rai "Puttan" / Mani (Double Role)	Filmfare Award for Best Performance in a Comic Role [Nominated]
1973	Jugnu	Mahesh	
1974	Badla	Hippie	
1974	Duniya Ka Mela		Filmfare Award for Best Performance in a Comic Role [Nominated]
1974	Kunwara Baap	Mahesh	Filmfare Award for Best Performance in a Comic Role [Nominated]. Mehmood also introduced music director Rajesh Roshan in this film
1974	Pocketmaar	Sunder	
1974	Ujala Hi Ujala	Saraswati	
1975	Qaid	Bajrangi	Filmfare Award for Best Performance in a Comic Role [Nominated]
1975	Salaakhen	Abdul Rehman	
1975	Vardaan		Filmfare Award for Best Performance in a Comic Role
1976	Ginny Aur Johnny		
1976	Jai Bajrang Bali		Shakun
1976	Sabse Bada Rupaiya		Filmfare Award for Best Performance in a Comic Role Nominated
1977	Aafat	Mahesh	
1977	Amaanat	Mahesh	
1977	Thief of Baghdad		
1978	Des Pardes	Anwar	
1978	Ek Baap Chhe Bete	Mahesh	
1979	Janta Hawaldar		
1979	Nauker	Dayal	Filmfare Award for Best Performance in a Comic Role [Nominated]
1980	Khanjar	Jagat	
1980	Lootmaar		
1980	Man Pasand	Popat	
1981	Hotel	Nawab Arshad Ali	
1981	Sannata	Marzabaan	
1982	Khud-Daar	Jagan	Filmfare Award for Best Performance in a Comic Role [Nominated]
1982	Suraag	Father of prospective bride	
1986	Ladies Hostel	Mahesh Bhatta	Kannada film with B. Sarojadevi in lead role
1987	Imaandaar	Tiwarilal	
1987	Majaal	Shrichand Titarmare	
1988	Faisla	Jaggu	
1993	Shreemaan Aashique	Menaka's Father	Special Appearance in Last Scene of film
1993	Khal-Naaikaa	Gangaram	
1993	Tahqiqaat	Micheal	
1994	Juaari	Anita's Father	
1994	Chaand Kaa Tukdaa	Babumashay	
1994	Andaz Apna Apna	Johnny (Wah-Wah Productions)	
1995	Guddu		
1996	Dushman Duniya Ka	Bakrewale Baba	
1998	Ghar Bazar		

== Awards ==
- Filmfare Best Supporting Actor Award – Won
  1963 Dil Tera Diwana
- Filmfare Best Comedian Award – Won
  1967 Pyar Kiye Jaa
  1970 Waris – CID Inspector Rajan/Ram Kumar #3/ Rajan's mother (double role)
  1972 Paras – Munna Sarkar
  1975 Vardaan
- Filmfare Best Comedian Award – Nominated
  1967 Love in Tokyo – Mahesh
  1968 Mehrban
  1969 Neel Kamal – Girdhar Gopal Agarwal
  1969 Sadhu Aur Shaitaan – Bajrang/Ram
  1970 Meri Bhabhi – Shambu
  1971 Humjoli – Shivram
  1972 Main Sunder Hoon – Sunder
  1973 Bombay to Goa – Khanna, Bus Conductor
  1974 Do Phool – Pavitra Kumar Rai 'Puttan'/Mani
  1975 Duniya Ka Mela
  1975 Kunwara Baap – Mahesh/Rickshaw Walla
  1976 Qaid – Bajrangi
  1977 Sabse Bada Rupaiya – Neki Ram
  1980 Nauker – Dayal
  1983 Khud-Daar – Jaggan

== See also ==
- Mehmood Ali Family
- List of Hindi film clans
