= Bachpan (1945 film) =

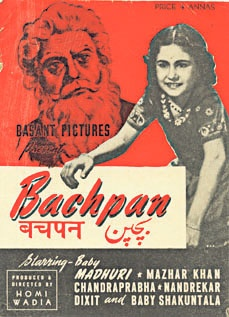
- बचपन
- Directed by: Homi Wadia
- Written by: Ishvar Chandar Kapoor (Dialogues)
- Screenplay by: Homi Wadia
- Story by: Ishar Chandar Kapoor
- Produced by: Homi Wadia; Keshav K. Kalpade (Associate Producer)
- Starring: Mazhar Khan; Baby Madhuri; Boman Shroff; Nandrekar; Shashi Kapoor
- Cinematography: Dali Duruwala
- Edited by: Datta Kotalji
- Music by: S. N. Tripathi
- Production company: Basant Pictures
- Release date: 1945
- Country: India
- Language: Hindi

Bachpan (Hindi: बचपन, Childhood) is a 1945 Hindi drama film directed by Homi Wadia. It was produced by Homi Wadia's Basant Films and had music by S. N. Tripathi. The film starred Mazhar Khan, Chandraprabha, Shashi Kapoor Sr., Gulab, Dalpat, Baby Shakuntala, Dixit, Baby Madhuri.

== Cast ==
- Mazhar Khan
- Baby Madhuri as Madhu
- Chandraprabha
- Nandrekar
- Dixit
- Shakuntala
- Gulab
- Dalpat
- Shashi Kapoor

== Music ==
The film's music was composed by S. N. Tripathi, with lyrics written by Ishvar Chandar Kapoor.

=== Song list ===
#	Title
1	"Bagiyo Me Phool Khile Hai"
2	"Billi Ki Tarah Woh Dabe Paanv Chali Re"
3	"Bole Re Panchi Bole"
4	"Choti Si Kahani"
5	"Ye Than Hai Mere Samne"
6	"Hindustan Hamara"
7	"Gokul Ki Ek Naar Chhabili"
8	"Main To Girdhar Aage Nachungi"
9	"Rakhi Ka Din Aaya"
10	"Matware Manwa Le Chal"
