= Kaash =

- Poster
- Directed by: Mahesh Bhatt
- Written by: Mahesh Bhatt
- Produced by: Anwar Ali; F. K. Rattonsey
- Starring: Jackie Shroff; Dimple Kapadia; Master Makrand; Anupam Kher
- Cinematography: Babubhai Mistri; Pravin Bhatt
- Edited by: Waman Bhonsle
- Music by: Rajesh Roshan
- Production company: Yokohama Productions
- Distributed by: Yokohama Productions
- Release date: 4 September 1987
- Running time: 140 minutes
- Country: India
- Language: Hindi

Kaash is a 1987 Bollywood film written and directed by Mahesh Bhatt. It is produced by the comedian Mehmood's brother Anwar Ali. The film was described as a semi-art film and upon release, received critical acclaim. Arshad Warsi made his film debut as an assistant director to Bhatt with this film.

== Plot ==
Ritesh, a popular film star and his wife Pooja live a wealthy lifestyle with their seven-year-old child Romi. However, after a series of unexpected box office failures and huge losses, he is hounded by creditors and consequently, the couple sell all their personal property and belongings. Frustrated and embittered by his career dive, Ritesh becomes an alcoholic. Pooja, who takes it upon herself to look after the family, works several jobs. This leads to continuous differences between the two, and Romi, their child, becomes a silent spectator to their constant fights and disputes at home.

One day, in a hotel where Pooja works as a chambermaid, she is molested by a hoodlum. A stranger called Alok saves Pooja from him and offers her a job in his firm, much to the annoyance of Ritesh, who would prefer that she stay at home. Ritesh feels it is the last straw for him. He asks Pooja to choose between her job and her family and house. She leaves. Ritesh wins Romi's custody, but soon discovers that Romi is going to die from brain cancer.

To sustain their child's happiness and to take care of him, Ritesh and Pooja agree to reunite and spend time together, fulfilling all his wishes before he dies. Thrown together under the shadow of their child's upcoming death, Ritesh and Pooja, in experiencing the traumatic ordeal, rediscover themselves and each other.

== Cast ==
- Jackie Shroff as Ritesh
- Dimple Kapadia as Pooja
- Master Makrand as Romi
- Anupam Kher as Alok
- Soni Razdan as Najma
- Dalip Tahil as Vijay
- Mukri as Municipal Dog Catcher
- Satish Kaushik as Jagan (Special appearance)
- Mehmood as Jin (Special appearance)

== Music ==
Kaash

Soundtrack album by Rajesh Roshan
- Released: 1987
- Genre: Feature film soundtrack
- Label: Venus Records and Tapes
- Producer: Rajesh Roshan

Rajesh Roshan chronology
Khudgarz (1987)	Kaash (1987)	Kabzaa (1988)

The soundtrack of the film contains 5 songs. The music is composed by Rajesh Roshan, with lyrics authored by Faruq Qaiser. The film was one of last playback singing appearances by Kishore Kumar before his death.

Song	Singer
"Baad Muddat Ke Hum Tum"	Kishore Kumar
"Phool Ye Kahan Se"	Kishore Kumar; Sadhana Sargam
"O Yaara, Tu Pyaron Se Hai Pyara"	Kishore Kumar; Anupama
"Chhoti Si Hai Baat, Koi Nahin Yeh Jane"	Mohammed Aziz; Asha Bhosle
"Kya Hai Tumhara Naam; Allahdin; Kya Hai Tumhare Paas, Chirag-E-Chin"	Mohammed Aziz; Sonali Bajpai; Mehmood

== Reception ==
Akshay Shah of PlanetBollywood.com wrote, "Kaash is an apt depiction of emotions at its highest and finest. It rates alongside Anand, Mili and Khamoshi as one of the best tear jerking films in Indian cinema."

In a 2000 article reviewing the last two decades in Hindi cinema, Bhawana Somaaya of The Hindu wrote, "Kaash... consolidates Mahesh Bhatt's position in the industry as a director to reckon with... The film recognises Dimple Kapadia and Jackie Shroff as performing artistes." M.L. Dhawan from The Tribune, while documenting the famous Hindi films of 1987, described the film as "a sensitive and sentimental melodrama", further noting that "Jackie and Dimple gave intense performances that were straight from the heart."

Pritish Nandy, editor of The Illustrated Weekly of India, was critical of the film, calling it Bhatt's "lousiest film", but he praised the performances, noting Shroff for his "powerful performance" and writing of Kapadia, "Dimple achieves the impossible. Bereft of her glitzy make-up, glamour and filmi mannerisms, she comes alive as never before: beautiful, sensitive, intense. You almost feel you've discovered a new actress on the screen."
