= Ek Baap Chhe Bete =

- Directed by: Mehmood
- Starring: Mehmood; Yogeeta Bali; Pucky Ali; Lucky Ali; Macky Ali
- Music by: Rajesh Roshan
- Release date: 17 February 1978
- Country: India
- Language: Hindi

Ek Baap Chhe Bete (Translation One Father Six Sons) is a 1978 Bollywood film directed by Mehmood and starring Mehmood alongside his real-life sons Lucky Ali, Manzoor Ali, Macky Ali, Masoom Ali, Pucky Ali and Mansoor Ali and his wife Tracy Ali. The film also features cameo appearances by Jaya Bachchan, Nutan, Moushmi Chatterjee, Kishore Kumar and Yogeeta Bali.

== Cast ==
- Mehmood as Mahesh
- Yogeeta Bali as Sabu
- I. S. Johar as BR Choranija
- Shubha Khote as Sheela
- Pucky Ali
- Lucky Ali
- Macky Ali
- Nutan Behl (Cameo)
- Jaya Bhaduri (Cameo)
- Moushumi Chatterji (Cameo)

== Music ==
1. "Ek Baap Aur Chhe Bete" – Kishore Kumar
2. "Daddy Don't Go" – Kishore Kumar
3. "Ghadi Milan Ki Aayi Aayi Tu Chhuti Lekar Aaja" – Mohammed Rafi, Sulakshana Pandit
4. "Buddhe Teri Chaal Buddhe" – Lucky Ali, Vijeta Pandit, Mehmood, Sulakshana Pandit
5. "Walking And I`m Walking All Alone" – Lucky Ali
