= Do Phool =

- Poster
- Directed by: S. Ramanathan
- Written by: K. Balachander
- Based on: Anubavi Raja Anubavi (Tamil)(1967)
- Starring: Ashok Kumar; Vinod Mehra; Mehmood
- Music by: R. D. Burman
- Production company: Balaji Kalamandir
- Release date: 21 March 1973
- Country: India
- Language: Hindi

Do Phool (transl. Two Flowers) is a 1973 Indian Hindi-language comedy film directed by S. Ramanathan. The film stars Ashok Kumar, Vinod Mehra and Mehmood. It is a remake of the Tamil-language film Anubavi Raja Anubavi.

== Plot ==
Diwan Bahadur Atal Rai lives a wealthy lifestyle in his mansion "Gulistan" in Malabar Hill, Bombay, along with his wife, Malti, and two sons, Pavitra and Charitra. Pavitra was adopted while Charitra is his biological son. They are irresponsible, spoiled, Matric-failed, and refuse to do any work. They humiliate their father when he decides to get Charitra married to Shaila, the daughter of Advocate Vardhraj, and he asks them to leave. Shortly thereafter, Charitra returns home claiming that he had an altercation with his Pavitra and knifed him to death. Subsequently, Police Inspector Madhusudan Apte gets enough evidence to arrest Charitra. He is let go with a warning after admitting that this was a prank. Then Charitra goes on the run after the Mahabaleshwar Police find a dead body and identify it as that of Pavitra. A frantic Atal and Malti attempt to make sense of this homicide, and are eventually relieved when Pavitra is brought home by Shaila and her friend, Poonam Apte. Hilarious chaos will soon prevail when Pavitra claims that his real name is Mani and he lives in Cochin with his widowed mother. Atal is convinced that Pavitra is playing another prank, but a number of questions remain unanswered: if Pavitra is alive - what of the dead body? and exactly when and why did Pavitra decide to change his name to Mani?

== Cast ==
- Ashok Kumar as Diwan Bahadur Atal Rai
- Vinod Mehra as Charitra Kumar Rai "Chuttan"
- Mehmood as Pavitra Kumar Rai "Puttan" / Mani (Double Role)
- Aruna Irani as Shaila
- Anjana Mumtaz as Poonam Apte
- Rama Prabha as Rukmini
- Jeevan as Advocate Vardhraj
- Chandrashekhar as Inspector Madhusudan Apte
- Sunder as Pandit
- Lalita Pawar as Mani's Mother
- Laxmi Chhaya as Dancer

== Soundtrack ==
The music for the film was composed by R. D. Burman, and the lyrics were penned by Majrooh Sultanpuri. The most popular song from the film "Muthukodi Kawadi Hada" is based on "Muthukulikka Vaareergala", composed by M. S. Viswanathan for Anubavi Raja Anubavi.

	Song title	Performer (s)	Length	Composer
01	"Oh Latloosh"	Mehmood	00:03:14	RD Burman
02	"Lailo Shabab Aayi"	Lata Mangeshkar	00:03:10	RD Burman
03	"Maaf Karo Maaf Karo"	Kishore Kumar, Asha Bhosle, Usha Mangeshkar, Mehmood	00:03:27	RD Burman
04	"Muthukodi Kawadi Hada"	Asha Bhosle, Mehmood	00:03:24	RD Burman
05	"Maaf Karo Maaf Karo (Part 2)"	Kishore Kumar, Asha Bhosle, Usha Mangeshkar, Mehmood		RD Burman
