= Padosan =

1968 Indian film by Jyoti Swaroop

- Film poster
- Directed by: Jyoti Swaroop
- Written by: Rajinder Krishan
- Based on: Pasher Bari by Arun Chowdhury
- Produced by: Mehmood; N. C. Sippy
- Starring: Sunil Dutt; Saira Banu; Mehmood; Kishore Kumar; Om Prakash
- Cinematography: K. H. Kapadia
- Edited by: D. N. Pai
- Music by: R. D. Burman
- Distributed by: Kailash Dossani Investments Pvt. Ltd. Mehmood Productions
- Release date: 29 November 1968
- Running time: 157 minutes
- Country: India
- Language: Hindi
- Box office: ₹2.8 cr

Padosan (pronounced [pə.ɽoː.san], transl. Female Neighbour) is a 1968 Indian Hindi-language musical comedy film directed by Jyoti Swaroop and produced by Mehmood, N. C. Sippy and written by Rajendra Krishan. It is a remake of the Bengali film Pasher Bari (1952) based on a short story of the same name by Arun Chowdhury, starring Bhanu Bandyopadhyay and Sabitri Chatterjee. The short story it was is considered to be an adaptation of the French play Cyrano de Bergerac (1897) by Edmond Rostand. The film stars Sunil Dutt, Saira Banu, Mehmood and Kishore Kumar. Mukri, Raj Kishore and Keshto Mukherjee played the supporting roles.

Indiatimes Movies ranked the film amongst the "Top 25 Must See Bollywood Films". Music was composed by R. D. Burman. Kumar sang for himself while Manna Dey sang for Mehmood. Many of the scenes were shot in Brindavan Gardens located near the city of Mysore.

== Plot ==
Bhola is an innocent young man who lives with his maternal uncle (Mama) Kunwar Pratap Singh. Bhola is enraged at Pratap Singh who has been searching for a girl to marry, even though his wife is alive. Angry, he leaves his uncle's house and moves in to live with his Aunt (Pratap's wife). There, he finds a beautiful neighbour Bindu and falls in love with her. Bindu however, gets annoyed by Bhola and refutes his advances. Vidyapati aka Guru, who is a singer and theater actor and Bhola's friend and mentor comes to his rescue and spies on Bindu.

Bindu tolerates advances of her South Indian music teacher Master Pillai aka Masterji. Guru realizes that Bindu loves music and that is the reason for her closeness with Masterji. He tries to teach Bhola to sing but fails miserably. Inspired by dubbed songs, he devises an idea and asks Bhola to mimic the lyrics to songs while he does the real singing in the background himself. Their plan to impress Bindu succeeds and Bindu slowly starts falling in love with Bhola, much to the chagrin of Masterji.

When singing at Bindu's birthday party, one of her friends becomes suspicious at Bhola's voice. She leads Bindu to discover Bhola's fake act. It makes Bindu angry and in a fit of rage, she agrees to the marriage proposal of Kunwar Pratap Singh, which she had earlier rejected upon knowing that he is Bhola's Maternal Uncle. Guru and his gang visit Pratap Singh and plead him to reject the proposal for his nephew's love, to which Pratap Singh agrees. This further enrages Bindu who decides to marry Masterji, just to get even with Bhola.

Helpless to stop the wedding, Guru comes up a last-ditch plan to fake Bhola's suicide. They arrange a suicide scene and start shouting and mourning Bhola's "death". Everyone arrives at the scene including Bindu who is deeply shocked and tries to wake him up. Guru tells her that only her unrequited love could have a chance of bringing the dead back and encourages her to try harder. After some more pretending, Bhola finally cries and wakes up, embracing Bindu. Everyone including Masterji is happy and shocked to see the power of true love. In the end, Bhola's Maternal Uncle and Aunt also reconcile and bless the newlywed couple. In the last scene of movie, Masterji is shown playing 'Shehnai' with tears in his eyes.

== Cast ==
- Sunil Dutt as Bhola
- Saira Banu as Bindu
- Mehmood as Master Pillai ‘Masterji’
- Kishore Kumar as Vidyapati ‘Guru’
- Om Prakash as Kumar Pratap Singh
- Dulari as Mrs. Pratap Singh
- Sunder as Pandit Jankiprasad
- Agha as Bindu's Father
- Mukri as Banarasi
- Keshto Mukherjee as Kalkattiya
- Raj Kishore as Lahori
- Moolchand as Pratap Singh's servant

== Soundtrack ==
Padosan

Soundtrack album by R.D. Burman
- Released: January 1, 1968
- Genre: Feature film soundtrack
- Length: 35:41
- Label: Saregama India
- Producer: R.D. Burman

R.D. Burman chronology
Baharon Ke Sapne (1967)	Padosan (1968)	Abhilasha (1968)

All lyrics are written by Rajendra Krishan, all music is composed by R.D. Burman. Kishore Kumar's character in the film was inspired by the personality of his uncle, Dhananjay Banerjee (a classical singer), and music director Khemchand Prakash. The song Ek Chatur Naar was originally sung in the 1941 film Jhoola by Ashok Kumar.

Songs
No.	Title	Singer(s)	Length
1.	"Mere Samnewali Khidki Mein"	Kishore Kumar	2:52
2.	"Sharam Aati Hai Magar"	Lata Mangeshkar	5:06
3.	"Kehna Hai Kehna Hai"	Kishore Kumar	3:41
4.	"Aao Aao Sanwariya"	Manna Dey	4:36
5.	"Main Chali Main Chali"	Asha Bhosle and Lata Mangeshkar	5:08
6.	"Mere Bhole Balam"	Kishore Kumar	3:14
7.	"Bhai Battur"	Lata Mangeshkar	4:40
8.	"Ek Chatur Naar Karke Sringar"	Kishore Kumar, Manna Dey and Mehmood	6:21
Total length:			35:41

== Production ==
Mehmood and R.D. Burman were very close and had a good relationship since their first collaboration in the movie Chhote Nawab (1961). Four years later, Mehmood made the film Bhoot Bungla (1965) and hired R.D. Burman as a music director and gave R.D. Burman a role to act in the movie. Therefore, Mehmmod being the producer of Padosan, the role of Bhola was first offered to R.D. Burman. However, he rejected it and wanted to continue his passion and pursue his career in music, and he already had acted in two movies, Bhoot Bungla and Pyar Ka Mausam, and also was a music director in these two movies as well. So, the role was later given to Sunil Dutt.

== Reception ==
Padosan was the sixth highest-grossing film of 1968, earning ₹2.8 crore worldwide.

=== Critical response ===
Padosan received positive reviews from critics upon release, with major praise directed at its direction, soundtrack, and performances by the cast. Amborish Roy Choudhury of Firstpost reviewed the film, writing that Sunil Dutt had built an impressive body of work, Saira Banu’s comic timing was evident, and Kishore Kumar—who had stopped acting to focus on singing—took on the role of Vidyapati after remarking that it reminded him of his uncle Dhananjay Bannerjee. Padosan created history with its phenomenal music by R. D. Burman and the impeccable comic performances of the principal cast. He further wrote that Dutt was always eager for experimentation and accepted the role of Bhola, a challenging role since he had not done comedy before. Manish Gaekwad of Scroll.in observed that Kishore Kumar conveyed humour visually in "Mere Samne Wali Khidki", while "Ek Chatur Naar" played out as a vocal challenge between him as an autodidact and the classically trained Manna Dey. A writer in Bollywood Hungama praised Sunil Dutt’s comedic performance, stating that his role surprised the audience, as he was primarily known for serious roles and marked a successful transformation of his screen image. In 2020, Asjad Nazir of Eastern Eye wrote that the film’s biggest strengths were Dutt’s portrayal of Bhola; a simpleton role which was differed from his traditional heroic image, Mehmood’s performance as Master Pillai, Kumar’s energetic turn as Guru, which lit up the screen, and the memorable portrayals by the supporting cast. The film was filled with witty dialogues, slapstick comedy, situational humour and larger-than-life characters.

== Legacy ==
Padosan has been widely regarded as one of Bollywood’s funniest and most entertaining films. The film was re-released on 13 September 2024. On the occasion, Banu stated that Padosan was close to her heart, describing it as "not only dearest to me but also a cherished piece of cinematic history" that the new generation should experience. She also praised it as a brilliant showcase of artists including Sunil Dutt, Mehmood, and Kishore Kumar.

Padosan has been included in several listings like 'The Economic Times's "Top 8 evergreen Hindi comedy movies that will always make you laugh", and Filmfare's "Top 42 Comedy Films Made In Bollywood". Indiatimes Movies ranked Padosan among the "Top 25 Must See Bollywood Films". Devesh Sharma of Filmfare included the film in the list of "Best Bollywood Comedies Set in Homes". Film Companion included the film in its "Top 100 Bollywood Albums". Dinesh Raheja referred to Padosan as a "perennially popular" romantic comedy film of 1960s. He also remarked that Dutt gave a warm performance as the bumbling Bhola, a role that many heroes of the 1960s would have been reluctant to play. Banu portrayed a cheeky, light-hearted glam doll with delectable airiness and Kumar displayed a rare comic talent. He further appreciated the choreography, direction and soundtrack.

Amit Upadhaya of ThePrint in a retrospective article on film's 50th anniversary wrote, ″As cult comedy films go, Jyoti Swaroop’s Padosan is one of the few in Hindi film history to never run out of laughs. The trademark innocent lunacy of the lovable film turned 50 this year″. In a similar 50th anniversary article, Devansh Sharma of Firstpost praised RD Burman's music for changing the state of comedy genre in Hindi films. He felt that Burman's music gave "wings to the camera that was otherwise doomed to sit still". Krishan's poetry also provided the editor and director considerable freedom to select appropriate shots for each emotion expressed in the songs.

The character ″Muranchand Swami″ played by Satish Kaushik in 1996 film Saajan Chale Sasural, which was inspired from character Master Pillai, played by Mehmood. In an interview, Kaushik stated that Mehmood's performance in Padosan inspired him to become an actor. He further said, "I was lucky enough to recreate that kind of role in Saajan Chale Sasural and I got the Filmfare Award also. That was a vital inspiration for me." Characters of the animated series Guru Aur Bhole which aired on Sony Yay, were inspired by Kishore Kumar's and Sunil Dutt's characters from the film. The character Guru is voiced by Amit Kumar, son of Kishore Kumar. The song "Ek Chatur Naar" was recreated in the 2017 film Machine, and was sung by Tanishk Bagchi.

Actor Kamal Haasan recalled that Hindi films had not played in Chennai for many years due to the agitation against the imposition of Hindi. While reminiscing about Padosan, he said, "When I went to see Padosan, I went to protest against it – we had been told it was a film where South Indians were made fun of. We went in to agitate, [but] came out smiling, as fans of Mehmood saab, imitating him. I told Mehmood saab this story many years later when I met him. And that’s how I started watching Hindi films again."

Actor Salman Khan had dressed up and acted as Kishore Kumar's character Guru twice.

The first time was in the 1996 film Dushman Duniya Ka, where he was a special appearance and played a cameo fictional role of himself dressed up as Guru, going for a shoot for the film "Padosan Part 2". Few minutes in the movie, Salman Khan lip syncs to a song "Mere Naujawano Pyare Naujawano" sung by Amit Kumar, who playbacks for Salman Khan and is the son of Kishore Kumar. The song has the same tune of another song "Mere Bhole Balam" (Meri Pyari Bindu) from the movie Padosan itself. Mere Naujawano Pyare Naujawano was sung by Amit Kumar, composed by Anu Malik (original tune of R.D.Burman), and the lyrics were penned by Ravindra Jain and was a recreated version of Meri Pyari Bindu.

The second time was for a promo for Salman's show Bigg Boss in Season 11. For the promo, Salman Khan once again dressed up as Guru, playing the harmonium and singing the song "Mere Samnewali Khidki Mein" once again from the film Padosan.
