= Parwana (1971 film) =

- Directed by: Jyoti Swaroop
- Written by: Agha Jani Kashmiri (dialogue and screenplay); Madhusudan (screenwriter) (story)
- Produced by: R. L. Suri; Jai Pawar; N. C. Sippy
- Starring: Navin Nischol; Yogeeta Bali; Amitabh Bachchan; Om Prakash
- Cinematography: S. Ramachandra
- Edited by: Waman Bhosle; Guru Dutt
- Music by: Madan Mohan; Kaifi Azmi (lyrics)
- Release date: 9 July 1971
- Running time: 120 minutes
- Country: India
- Language: Hindi

Parwana (lit. Moth) is a 1971 Indian Hindi-language psychological thriller film directed by Jyoti Swaroop. It stars Navin Nischol, Yogeeta Bali, Amitabh Bachchan, Om Prakash in lead roles and Shatrughan Sinha in a special appearance. In this film, Bachchan plays his first negative role as an infatuated lover-turned-murderer. The movie was heavily referenced and part of the plot in 2007 film Johnny Gaddaar.

== Plot ==
Kumar, an artist by profession is in love with Asha. Asha wins a trip to Ooty in a dance competition and falls in love with a wealthy tea plantation owner Rajeshwar. When Kumar finds out, he goes to Asha's uncle, Ashok Verma and demands Asha's hand in marriage. When he refuses, Kumar plots to kill him. Kumar boards and exits various modes of transportation to create alibis and avoid any possibilities of suspicion (The manner in which Kumar plans and executes the murder is regarded as an immensely brilliant and engaging sequence.) Kumar finally kills Ashok and frames Rajeshwar in the hope of winning Asha's love. But Asha still loves Rajeshwar, and believes in his innocence. She promises to stay with Kumar forever, if he gets Rajeshwar exonerated from the death sentence. Realising that Rajeshwar will always remain Asha's love Kumar writes down his confession with details of how he executed his murder plan, gives it to Rajeshwar and commits suicide.

== Cast ==
- Navin Nischol as Rajeshwar Singh
- Yogeeta Bali as Asha Parekh
- Amitabh Bachchan as Kumar Sen
- Shatrughan Sinha as Public Prosecutor (Special Appearance)
- Om Prakash as Ashok Verma
- Helen as a Cabaret Dancer
- Laxmi Chhaya as Kamla Singh
- Lalita Pawar as Sarita Singh
- Asit Sen as Mr. Ghosh
- Rajeeta Thakur as Mrs. Ghosh

== Music ==
Since director Jyoti Swaroop had a successful pairing with R. D. Burman in Padosan, the music of the movie was originally to be composed by Burman. But creative differences cropped up and Madan Mohan was roped in. The lyrics were penned by Kaifi Azmi.

Song	Singer
"Simti Si, Sharmaayi Si"	Kishore Kumar
"Yun Na Sharma, Phaila De Apni Gori Gori Baahen"	Kishore Kumar, Mohammed Rafi
"Chale Ladkhadaake"	Asha Bhosle
"Piya Ki Gali Laage Bhali, Roko Na Sakhi, Jiya Bas Mein Nahin"	Asha Bhosle, Parveen Sultana
"Jis Din Se Maine Tumko Dekha Hai"	Asha Bhosle, Mohammed Rafi
"O Jameela Chhammak Chhallo, Mukh Se Parda Hata De"	Asha Bhosle, Mohammed Rafi

== Home media ==
The DVD of the film was released by IndiaWeekly under its own label.
