= Sadhu Aur Shaitaan =

- Hindi: साधु और शैतान
- Directed by: A. Bhimsingh
- Written by: Usilai Somanathan
- Based on: Sadhu Mirandal (1966 film)
- Produced by: A. Bhimsingh; N. C. Sippy
- Starring: Mehmood; Bharathi; Kishore Kumar; Om Prakash; Pran
- Cinematography: G. Vittal Rao
- Music by: Laxmikant–Pyarelal
- Release date: 29 November 1968
- Country: India
- Language: Hindi

Sadhu Aur Shaitaan (transl. The Sage and the Devil) is a 1968 Hindi action comedy film, directed by A. Bhimsingh. The film stars Om Prakash, Pran in title roles, along with Mehmood, Bharathi, Kishore Kumar in lead roles. The movie is a remake of 1966 Tamil suspense-comedy Sadhu Mirandal.

In the film an honest bank employee becomes the prime suspect for a bank robbery actually committed by his housemate. The suspect's best friend is implicated in the death of the actual bank robber. The two friends have to hide from the authorities.

== Plot ==
Innocent and honest Bajrang drives a taxi and helps everyone. He is devoted to another kind-hearted gentleman Sadhuram, who is a bank employee. Bajrang is attracted to a schoolteacher, Vidya. Vidya's brother Dinanath is a Drama Artist. One day a man claiming to be a childhood friend of Sadhuram, named Sher Khan, enters their lives. His motive is to rob the bank where Sadhuram is employed and blame Sadhuram for this. He manipulates Sadhuram into accepting him and moves in with him.

Sher Khan borrows a large sum of money from Sadhuram, and also manages to duplicate the bank's safe's key, and steals the money. The Bank Manager (Nazir Hussain) notifies the police of the robbery and Sadhuram becomes the prime suspect. In panic Sadhuram, who comes into possession of the money that Sher Khan has stolen, flees with the police on his tail. Sher Khan (alias dacoit Dilawar Singh) is killed and his dead body ends up in the back seat of Bajrang's taxi, and Bajrang too is on the run. No one can clear them of the crime because Dilawar Singh is dead.

== Cast ==
- Mehmood as Bajrang "Birju"
- Bharathi as Vidya Shastri
- Kishore Kumar as Pandit Dinanath Shastri
- Om Prakash as Sadhuram
- Pran as Daku Dilawar Singh / Sher Khan / Sardar Jarnail Singh
- Nazir Hussain as Bank Manager
- Anwar Hussain as Police Inspector
- Mukri as Krishnamurthy
- Jankidas as Jankidas
- Dulari as Ramdeyi
- Tun Tun as Sundari
- Vijayalalitha as Cabaret Dancer
- Sunder as Trivedi

== Uncredited Special Appearance ==
- Ashok Kumar as Hair Dresser
- Sunil Dutt as Catholic Priest D'Souza
- Dilip Kumar as Man With Sugarcane
- Mumtaz as Woman With Sugarcane
- Trilok Kapoor as Lord Shiva (In Play)
- Nirupa Roy as Goddess Parvati (In Play)
- Jeevan as Narad (In Play)
- Lalita Pawar as Lalita (In Play)
- Anwar Ali as Groom (In Taxi)
- Shubha Khote as Bride (In Taxi)

== Soundtrack ==
Song	Singer
"Meri Laila, Meri Laila"	Mohammed Rafi
"Mehbooba Mehbooba"	Mohammed Rafi
"Nandlal Gopal Daya Karke Rakh Jakar"	Usha Mangeshkar, Asha Bhosle
"A For Apple, B For Baby, C For Camel, D For Daddy"	Asha Bhosle, Manna Dey
