= Khud-Daar =

1982 film by Ravi Tandon

- Film poster
- Directed by: Ravi Tandon
- Written by: Kader Khan
- Produced by: Anwar Ali; F.K. Rattonsey
- Starring: Sanjeev Kumar; Amitabh Bachchan; Vinod Mehra; Parveen Babi; Tanuja; Bindiya Goswami; Prem Chopra; Mehmood
- Cinematography: Pravin Bhatt
- Music by: Rajesh Roshan
- Release date: 30 July 1982
- Running time: 169 mins
- Country: India
- Language: Hindi

Khud-Daar (transl. Self-Respecting) is a 1982 Indian Hindi-language action film directed by Ravi Tandon. The music is by Rajesh Roshan and the lyrics by Majrooh Sultanpuri. The film stars Sanjeev Kumar, Amitabh Bachchan, Parveen Babi, Vinod Mehra, Prem Chopra, Mehmood, Bindiya Goswami and Tanuja in pivotal roles. It was remade in Tamil as Padikkadhavan and in Telugu as Driver Babu.

== Plot ==
Govind and Rajesh are two brothers who are happy being brought up by their considerably older half-brother Hari (Sanjeev Kumar). However, when Hari has to leave home for two months to complete his law degree, his newly married wife Seema (Tanuja), jealous of her husband's excessive affection for the two, ill treats them, forcing them to leave home and escape to Bombay.

After days spent doing menial labour, the two brothers are finally given a home by the widower Rahim( A.K. Hangal), who has a son Anwar and daughter Farida. Govind (Amitabh Bachchan) takes on the responsibility of providing for his brother's education by becoming the taxi-driver Chhotu Ustad. Rajesh, however, is ambitious and foppish, and spurns his brother and the latter's pride by marrying the rich Seth Verma's daughter Manju and becoming a ghar jamai.

Verma's brother Bansi (Prem Chopra), who has actually been instrumental in fixing up this marriage, employs the unsuspecting Rajesh to carry on a drug-smuggling trade using the vehicles of the Verma Transport Company, owned by the Seth. One such operation is foiled by the police, and Anwar, also mixed up in his business, is left seriously injured. Bansi's men attempt to kidnap Anwar to destroy evidence when Govind is not at home. In the skirmish that ensues, Rahim is shot fatally.

In the aftermath of the tragedy and Rajesh's realisation of how he has been used by Bansi, Rajesh seeks his brother's mercy. However, at this very moment, Bansi murders Seth Verma and tries to frame Rajesh for it. However, it is Govind who is found at the scene of the crime and accused of murder. The judge at his trial is Hari, who is now one of the leading legal eagles in the city. In the course of the trial, the real identity of the accused and his brother are revealed to Hari. Hari now steps down as judge and becomes Govind's defense attorney. Through a series of astute investigations, he unearths the truth. Bansi, cornered, attempts to shoot Hari and escapes the courtroom, but is finally tracked down by Govind in his beloved taxi 'Basanti'. As the smuggler is arrested, the three brothers are reconciled.

== Cast ==
- Sanjeev Kumar as Hari Srivastava
- Amitabh Bachchan as Govind Srivastava / Chhotu Ustaad
  - Raju Shrestha as Adolescent Govind
- Vinod Mehra as Rajesh Srivastava
- Parveen Babi as Mary
- Tanuja as Seema
- Bindiya Goswami as Manju Verma
- Prem Chopra as Bansi
- Mehmood as Jaggan, a banana seller and friend of Govind
- A. K. Hangal as Rahim Chacha
- Ramesh Deo as Ramanathan
- Pinchoo Kapoor as Mr. Verma
- Madhu Malini as Farida, Daughter of Rahim Chacha
- Mukri as Tailor
- Ali Masood as Anwar, Son of Rahim Chacha
- Satyen Kappu as Pascal, Beer Bar Owner
- Yusuf Khan as Peter
- Vikas Anand as Police Inspector
- Raza Murad as Public Prosecutor Lawyer
- Gajanan Jagirdar as Replaced Judge in place of Hari Srivastava
- Moolchand as Small-time Smuggler

== Production ==
During production, the film ran into financial trouble, and after Mehmood refused to help Ali with the financing, he resorted to partnering with F.K. Rattonsey who provided the money to complete the film.

== Soundtrack ==
All the songs were composed by Rajesh Roshan and lyrics were penned by Majrooh Sultanpuri.

#	Title	Singer(s)	Duration
1	"Disco '82"	Kishore Kumar, Lata Mangeshkar	03:46
2	"Hat Ja Bajoo Nahin To Uda Doonga"	Kishore Kumar, Saiyyed Ul Hasan	05:25
3	"Angrezi Main Kehte Hain Ki I Love You"	Kishore Kumar, Lata Mangeshkar	06:21
4	"Maa Ka Pyar"	Kishore Kumar	07:18
5	"Oonche Neeche Raaste"	Kishore Kumar, Lata Mangeshkar	05:22
6	"Mach Gaya Shor"	Kishore Kumar, Lata Mangeshkar	06:17
7	"Oonche Neeche Raaste" (sad)	Amit Kumar	02:21
