= Bombay to Goa (1972 film) =

- Film poster
- Directed by: S. Ramanathan
- Written by: Rajinder Krishan (dialogue)
- Story by: Usalai Somanathan
- Based on: Madras to Pondicherry by Usalai Somanathan
- Produced by: Mehmood; N. C. Sippy
- Starring: Amitabh Bachchan; Aruna Irani; Shatrughan Sinha; Nazir Hussain; Mehmood; Anwar Ali
- Cinematography: Jal Mistry
- Edited by: A. Paul Durai Singham
- Music by: R. D. Burman
- Production company: Mahmood Productions
- Release date: 3 March 1972
- Country: India
- Language: Hindi

Bombay to Goa is a 1972 Indian Hindi-language road comedy film directed by S. Ramanathan and produced by Mehmood and N. C. Sippy. Released in India on 3 March 1972, the film stars Amitabh Bachchan, Aruna Irani, Shatrughan Sinha, Nazir Hussain, Mehmood and Anwar Ali in lead roles. The film is known particularly for its catchy tunes and was a "superhit" at the box office. The film is a remake of a 1966 hit Tamil film Madras to Pondicherry and was an inspiration for the 2004 Marathi movie Navra Maza Navsacha which in turn was remade in Kannada in 2007 as Ekadantha. The Hindu had reported that Rajiv Gandhi was offered the lead role by Mehmood but he had turned it down. The music is composed by R. D. Burman with lyrics by Rajendra Krishan.

== Plot ==
The lives of Atmaram (Nazir Hussain) and his wife (Dulari) are turned upside down when they see the photographs of their daughter, Mala (Aruna Irani), in a magazine. They arrange for Mala's marriage with the son of Ramlal (Agha), but Mala is opposed to marrying anyone who she has not met, and is at the same time thrilled that the two persons she trusted, one Sharma (Shatrughan Sinha) and the other Verma (Manmohan), had actually submitted her photographs to a magazine, and were now willing to sign her up for a Bollywood film. Mala is not able to understand her parents' opposition to her way to fame and runs away from home with a lot of money for Sharma and Verma. Greed overtakes Sharma, leading to the death of Verma. Mala, who witnessed Sharma kill Verma, is now on the run for her life. She boards a bus from Mumbai which is bound for Goa. Sharma soon overtakes her and has one of his armed henchmen on the bus to kill her, and then arrives Mala's admirer and bodyguard, Ravi Kumar (Amitabh Bachchan), who not only protects Mala, but also accompanies her throughout the journey. Mala begins to trust and subsequently falls in love with Ravi Kumar. The bus journey is adventurous with the passengers, a totally mixed bunch, from all over India, different religions, cultures, and faiths, all thrown together for this journey. The bus is in the "control" of bus driver Rajesh (Anwar Ali), and bus conductor Khanna (Mehmood).

== Cast ==
- Amitabh Bachchan as Ravi Kumar
- Aruna Irani as Mala
- Shatrughan Sinha as Sharma
- Mehmood as Khanna (Bus conductor)
- Anwar Ali as Rajesh (Bus driver)
- Nazir Hussain as Atmaram (Mala's father)
- Dulari as Mala's mother
- Manmohan as Verma
- Manorama as Young girl's mother in the bus
- Lalita Pawar as Kashibai
- Mukri as South Indian passenger
- Agha as Ramlal (Ravi's father)
- Parveen Paul as Ravi's mother
- Pakoda Kadhar as Pakora Boy
- Randhir as Kader Bhai
- Sunder as Pandit
- Keshto Mukherjee as Bengali passenger
- Yusuf Khan as Boxer John Ragada
- Babbanlal Yadav as John Ragada's henchman
- Asit Sen as Dhaba owner
- Birbal as Marathi passenger
- Raj Kishore as Passenger
- Darshan Lal as Army man
- Kishore Kumar as Himself (Cameo Appearance)
- Junior Mehmood as Dhaba waiter (Cameo Appearance)
- Usha Iyer as Herself (Cameo Appearance)

== Soundtrack ==
1. "Dekha Na Haye Re" - Kishore Kumar
2. "Yeh Mehki Mehki Thandi Hawa" - Kishore Kumar
3. "Tum Meri Zindagi Mein" - Kishore Kumar, Lata Mangeshkar
4. "Dil Tera Hai Main Bhi Teri" - Kishore Kumar, Lata Mangeshkar
5. "Listen To The Pouring Rain" - Usha Uthup
6. "Haye Haye Yeh Thanda Paani" - Asha Bhosle
