= Kunwara Baap (1974 film) =

- Poster
- Directed by: Mehmood
- Based on: The Kid (1921) by Charlie Chaplin
- Produced by: Amarlal Chabria
- Starring: Mehmood; Macky Ali; Vinod Mehra; Lalita Pawar; Nazir Hussain
- Cinematography: Prabhakar N Niklankar
- Edited by: Bhagwant Deshpande
- Music by: Rajesh Roshan
- Release date: 29 November 1974 (India)
- Country: India
- Language: Hindi

Kunwara Baap (lit. 'The Bachelor Father') is a 1974 Hindi film produced by Amarlal Chabria. It is based on Charlie Chaplin's The Kid (1921). It is a film with a serious message about polio vaccination. Mehmood directed the film and stars in a main role along with Bharathi, Vinod Mehra, Tamil actress Manorama and Mehmood's son Macky Ali in other lead roles.

Mehmood made the film to raise awareness about polio, which had affected his own son, Macky Ali aka Maqdoom Ali. The Sports Day, a major scene in the movie, was shot in Bangalore's Bishop Cotton Boys' School where the boy studied. Mehmood's comedy scenes in the film earned him a Filmfare nomination for best actor in a comic role, the only nomination for the film.

Kunwara Baap was the debut film for famed music composer Rajesh Roshan. The hijra song "Saj Rahi Gali" sung by Mohammed Rafi had topped the annual Binaca Geet Mala, the only countdown show at the time.

== Plot ==
Radha (Bharathi) is the deserted wife of Vinod Mehra. She abandons her newly born baby boy outside a temple where he is rescued by a rickshawala (Mehmood). The boy develops polio and the rickshawala feels guilty after a doctor (Sanjeev Kumar) admonishes him. He promises to take care of the boy (Macky Ali) and love him as his own.

In the meantime, the boy's real-life parents reconcile and turn to a police officer (Vinod Khanna) for help in finding their missing son. When the boy is located, the rickshawala is unwilling to give him up. The policeman urges him to do so, as the parents are wealthy and can pay for an operation that will help the boy to walk again. He does so sorrowfully. The boy comes back with his parents after the operation only to see the rickshawala die. The film ends with Mehmood, the actor, getting up and explaining to the audience that his death was for the camera, but polio is real and deadly and that people should get their children vaccinated.

Kunwara Baap had special appearances by Dharmendra, Hema Malini, Sanjeev Kumar, Amitabh Bachchan, Vinod Khanna, Yogita Bali, Dara Singh, Lalita Pawar and Lucky Ali. It was the debut film of famed music composer Rajesh Roshan.

== Cast ==
- Mehmood as Mahesh
- Bharathi as Radha
- Vinod Mehra
- Macky Ali as Hindustan
- Manorama as Sheela
- Bhushan Tiwari as Kaloo Dada
- Nazir Hussain as Bishop Cotton School's Principal
- Mumtaz Ali as Sheela's Father
- Mukri as Havaldar
- Maruti
- Abbas Ali
- Sunder

=== Special appearances ===
- Dharmendra as himself
- Hema Malini as herself
- Sanjeev Kumar as Doctor
- Amitabh Bachchan as Anthony
- Vinod Khanna as Inspector Ramesh
- Yogeeta Bali as fake wife of Mahesh
- Dara Singh as wrestler
- Asit Sen as referee
- Lalita Pawar as matron
- Lucky Ali as Child artist

== Soundtrack ==
Song	Singer
"Main Hoon Ghoda Yeh Hai Gaadi"	Kishore Kumar, Mehmood
"Aari Aaja Nindiya"	Kishore Kumar, Lata Mangeshkar, Mehmood
"Jai Bholenath, Jai Ho Prabhu"	Kishore Kumar, Lata Mangeshkar
"Saj Rahi Gali Meri Maa"	Mohammed Rafi, Mehmood
