= Sabse Bada Rupaiya (1976 film) =

- Directed by: S. Ramanathan
- Written by: Abrar Alvi (Screenplay); Abrar Alvi (Dialogue); Babbanlal Yadav (Dialogue)
- Based on: Kasidre Kailasa (1971)
- Produced by: Mehmood
- Starring: Mehmood; Vinod Mehra; Moushumi Chatterjee
- Cinematography: Anwar Siraj
- Edited by: A. Paul Dorai Singam
- Music by: Basu Manohari
- Release date: 31 March 1976
- Country: India
- Language: Hindi

Sabse Bada Rupaiya (transl. Money is the Greatest) is a 1976 Indian Hindi-language film, produced by Mehmood and directed by S. Ramanathan.The film stars Mehmood, Vinod Mehra, Moushumi Chatterjee, Farida Jalal, Asit Sen, Agha, Keshto Mukherjee and Jeevan. The title song Sabse Bada Rupaiya is inspired by the music to the title song of the Hollywood musical 42nd Street (1933). The song was used again in an Abhishek Bachchan-starrer Bluffmaster (2005) in the opening credits. The core plot of the movie is based on the 1971 Kannada movie Kasidre Kailasa.

It was a SuperHit at BoxOffice.

== Cast ==
- Mehmood as Neki Ram
- Vinod Mehra as Amit Rai
- Moushumi Chatterjee as Sunita
- Farida Jalal as Bindiya
- Sulochana Latkar as Mrs. Rai
- Chandrashekhar as Doctor
- Jeevan as Seth Dhanra
- Libi Rana as Miss Bela the steno

== Plot ==
Generous and honest to a fault, multi-millionaire Amit Rai is always ready to lend a helping hand to the needy, even his business associates. His employee and close friend, Nekiram, warns him against doing this, but in vain. Then hard times befall him and his family, and he loses all his wealth, even his palatial home and items therein are to be auctioned. All the people he had helped, his business associates, even his fiancee, Sunita, abandon him. Penniless, homeless, and with a widowed mother, and an unwed sister, he re-locates near a hill station, to begin life anew and works as a labourer in an orchard. It is there he finds out that his financial ruin did not take place by chance, but it was a deliberate and deceptive plot to rid him of his riches by his friend Nekiram to show him that money is valuable and should not be given in charity in excess amounts. Nekiram then returns Amit's company to him.

== Songs ==
- "Vada Karo Jaanam" - Kishore Kumar, Lata Mangeshkar
- "Dariya Kinare Ek Bungla" (aka dariya kinare ek bungalow) - Kishore Kumar, Lata Mangeshkar
- "Bahi Jaiyo Na Raani" - Lata Mangeshkar & Usha Mangeshkar
- "Na Biwi Na Bachcha, Na Baap" - Mehmood
