= P. L. Raj =

Indian choreographer (1934–2002)

- Born: Devraj Peter Lewis; 10 August 1934; Coimbatore, Tamil Nadu
- Died: 9 July 2002 (aged 67); Mumbai, India
- Occupation: choreographer

Peter Lewis Raj (born Devraj Peter Lewis; 10 August 1934 – 9 July 2002) was a noted Hindi cinema choreographer, who was the leading choreographer of 1960 and 70s Hindi cinema. He established face-paced dancing and cabaret-style dance numbers. He most known for his work with Helen, Shammi Kapoor and Amitabh Bachchan, most notably film like Junglee (1961), Professor (1962), Teesri Manzil (1966), Intaquam (1969), Sholay (1975), and Don (1978). He choreographed over 1,000 films in Hindi as well as regional cinemas including Telugu, Bengali, Marathi and Punjabi.

== Early life ==
Raj was born Devraj Peter Lewis on 10 August 1934 in Coimbatore, Tamil Nadu, and grew up in Hyderabad from where he ran away at age 10 and reached Mumbai. He changed his name after he entered the film industry.

He was trained by dancer duo, Surya Kumar and Krishan Kumar who started training actors in Mumbai, after themselves receiving training from Azoorie, a popular dancer of early cinema. Other choreographer to come out of their training were Satyanarayan, Bapriprasad and many others.

== Career ==
Raj began his career in Bollywood in early 50s, a period when slow-paced dance sequences were phasing out and fast-paced rhythms were entering Hindi film music and along with it western dance moves. Initially he worked as background dancer in films, and went to assisting choreographer Krishna Kumar from whom he had earlier learnt dance, most notably in songs like "Mera Naam Chin Chin Chu in Howrah Bridge (1958) picturized on Helen. However, his first break as an independent choreographer was with Dev Anand and Mala Sinha starrer Love Marriage (1959). Raj also choreographed dances for various films including Junglee (1961) and Professor (1962) with Shammi Kapoor, Shagird (1967, "Bade Miya Diwane" ), Teesri Manzil (1966, "Aaja Aaja Mein Hoon Pyar Tera" and "Deewana Mujhsa Nahin"), Gumnaam (1965), Intaquam (1969), Sholay (1975), Muqaddar Ka Sikandar (1978, "Salaam-e-Ishq"), Don (1978), Sargam (1979, "Dafliwale Dafli Baja" and "Parbat Ke Us Paar"), Ek Duuje Ke Liye (1981) and Saagar (1985, "Jaane Do Naa"). He was the most successful film choreographer of 1960s and 70s Hindi cinema.

His choreography played an important in made cabaret an important part in Hindi cinema, as well as making dancer-actress Helen a household name. He taught Bharatnatyam and Kathak dances to Helen, and later choreographed most of famous dance numbers in films including, "O Haseena Zulfonwali" (Teesri Manzil 1966), "Mungda" (Inkaar 1977), "Aa Jaane Jaan" (Intaquam, 1969), "Mehbooba Mehbooba" (Sholay 1975), "Yeh Mera Dil" (Don 1978). He also choreographed for blockbuster Sholay (1975) including songs like "Mehbooba Mehbooba" picturized on Helen, and "Yeh Dosti Hum Nahin, in which he planned several tricky bike movement involving Amitabh Bachchan and Dharmendra. He choreographed Bachchan again in hit-song "Khaike Pan Banaraswala" in Don (1978) and "Jahan Teri Yeh Nazar Hai" in Kaalia (1981), songs which established his signature moves.

He also worked in Telugu, Bengali, Marathi and Punjabi movies. In all, he choreographed dance sequences in over 1,000 films.

== Personal life ==
He died on 9 July 2002, due to cardiac arrest at his home in Mahim, Mumbai, at age 67. He was survived by his wife, Devyani, a son Leslee and two daughters, Eliza and Greta. His son Leslee Lewis is a popular composer and a member of the duo Colonial Cousins. His death was condoled by the Minister of Information and Broadcasting, Government of India at the time, Smt. Sushma Swaraj.

== Filmography ==
- Love Marriage screen name as (Raj) (1959)
- Chaudhary Karnail Singh (1960) Punjabi Movie
- Junglee (1961)
- Professor (1962)
- Meri Surat Teri Ankhen (1963)
- Mr. X in Bombay (1964)
- Chitralekha (1964)
- Mama Ji (1964) Punjabi Movie
- Mere Sanam (1965)
- Gumnaam (1965)
- Teesri Manzil (1966)
- Budtameez (1966)
- Shagird (1967)
- Patthar Ke Sanam (1967)
- Hare Kanch Ki Chooriyan (1967)
- An Evening in Paris (1967)
- Shikar (1968)
- Mere Hamdam Mere Dost (1968)
- Mera Naam Johar (1968)
- Kanyadaan (1968)
- Intaquam (1969)
- Pushpanjali (1970)
- Sharmeelee (1971)
- Seeta Aur Geeta (1972)
- Raja Jani (1972)
- Bombay to Goa (1972)
- Anokhi Ada (1973)
- Loafer (1973)
- Sholay (1975)
- Immaan Dharam (1977)
- Inkaar (1977)
- Kaala Aadmi (1978)
- Kasme Vaade (1978)
- Don (1978)
- Sargam (1979)
- The Great Gambler (1979)
- Shaan (1980)
- Alibaba Aur 40 Chor (1980)
- Ek Duuje Ke Liye (1981)
- Kaalia (1981)
- Khud-Daar (1982)
- Dharam Kanta (1982)
- Shakti (1982)
- Sohni Mahiwal (1984)
- Saagar (1985)
- Sanam Bewafa (1991)
- Raju Ban Gaya Gentleman (1992)
- Zamaana Deewana (1995)
- Kasam (2001)
