= Ye Hai Reshmi =

"Ye Hai Reshmi Zulfon Ka Andhera"

Song by Asha Bhosle

from the album Mere Sanam
- Language: Hindi
- Genre: sensual
- Composer: O. P. Nayyar
- Lyricist: Majrooh Sultanpuri

"Ye Hai Reshmi" (English: "It's Silky") is a Hindi song from the Indian film Mere Sanam (1965). It was composed by O. P. Nayyar and penned by Majrooh Sultanpuri. The song was sung by Asha Bhosle and picturised on Mumtaz. It went on to become one of the most popular Hindi songs. On Bhosle's 83rd birthday, DNA India declared it one of the best 7 songs she had performed.
