= Garam Coat =

- Directed by: Amar Kumar
- Screenplay by: Rajinder Singh Bedi
- Story by: Rajinder Singh Bedi
- Based on: The Overcoat by Nikolai Gogol
- Produced by: Rajinder Singh Bedi
- Starring: Balraj Sahni; Nirupa Roy
- Cinematography: K Vaikunth
- Edited by: Hrishikesh Mukherjee
- Music by: Pandit Amarnath; Majrooh Sultanpuri(lyrics)
- Release date: 1955
- Running time: 129 minutes
- Country: India
- Language: Hindi

Garam Coat (English: The Clerk and the Coat) was a 1955 Indian Hindi drama film, directed by Amar Kumar and written by noted writer Rajinder Singh Bedi, adapted from the short story, The Overcoat (1842) by Nikolai Gogol. Bedi set the story in the economic turmoil of the post-partition North India, also experiencing a collapse in human values, fractured social fabric and growing cynicism towards the state. However, beyond that, the story of the film diverges from the original; Bedi took the story to a completely different development and also gives it an optimistic ending, unlike the original, where the protagonist turns into a ghost. The film starred Balraj Sahni, Nirupa Roy, Jayant, Brahm Bhardwaj, Rashid Khan, and Vijayalaxmi. Music was by classical singer Pandit Amar Nath, and songs were sung by Lata Mangeshkar.

It was the first film of Cine Co-operative, a production company formed by Bedi along with Balraj Sahni and actress Geeta Bali in 1954, however when the film didn't do well commercially, he went back to writing screenplays for other directors, such as Madhumati (1958) and Anuradha (1960). His next film as a producer came in 1962; Rungoli.

The film won the 1956 Filmfare Award for Best Story for Rajinder Singh Bedi.

== Plot ==
Girdhari (Balraj Sahni) is a small-time clerk in a post office, where he handles money orders. He barely manages a living along with his wife, Geeta (Nirupa Roy), two daughters, and a son. He is unable to buy a new coat for himself and makes do with a tattered coat. One day after work, he sets out to buy toys for his children but loses the 100-rupee note in the pocket of his coat. Unable to find the money for household essentials, he plans to commit suicide, but misses the train. Upon returning home he confides in his wife. He tries part-time jobs and even petty crime, but never succeeds. Gradually he starts losing his mental balance. One day, he comes home to find the pantry full, his wife missing, and children playing outside his locked home. Unable to think clearly, he immediately suspects that she has taken up prostitution. He is unaware that his wife has taken part-time jobs. Unable to control his rage, he tries to strangle his wife and rushes towards an oncoming speeding train. However, he is saved by his coworkers, Sher Khan and Munnilal, and brought home. On the way, he realises that the lost bank note had actually slipped into the lining, of his coat's pocket. Back at home, Geeta gives the 100-rupee note to Sher Khan, to buy the fabric for a new winter coat.

== Cast ==
- Balraj Sahni as Girdharilal "Girdhari"
- Nirupa Roy as Geeta
- Jayant as Sher Khan
- Brahm Bhardwaj as Jewellery shop owner
- Rashid Khan as Munnilal
- Vijayalaxmi
- Baij Sharma
- Baby Chand

== Music ==
Music of the film was by Pandit Amarnath with lyrics by Majrooh Sultanpuri

- "Nanhe Re Munne Re Nanhaa Moraa Dole Mori Anganaiyaa" - Lata Mangeshkar
- "Ghar Aaja More Raaja More Raaja Aaja" - Lata Mangeshkar
- "Zulfonwaale Ko Kyaa Pataa Ghunghat Men Jal Gai Gori" - Lata Mangeshkar
- "Kahiyo Roen Dukhiyaare Jaa Re Panchhi Tu Jaa Re" - Lata Mangeshkar
