= Meri Aan =

- Directed by: Roopesh Kumar
- Produced by: Roopesh Kumar
- Starring: Ayub Khan; Farheen; Sabeeha
- Music by: Ravindra Jain
- Release date: 3 December 1993
- Country: India
- Language: Hindi

Meri Aan is a 1993 Indian Hindi film directed and produced by Roopesh Kumar. It stars Ayub Khan, Farheen, Sabeeha in lead roles. Sanjay Dutt made a cameo appearance.

== Cast ==
- Ayub Khan as Salim
- Farheen as Farheen
- Sabeeha as Rukhsar
- Mukesh Khanna as Police Commissioner Ashfaque Khan
- Anjana Mumtaz as Mrs. Ashfaque Khan
- Shahbaz Khan as Sher Khan
- Deepak Shirke as Kaalia Patil
- Shashi Puri as Advocate Mahesh Agarwal
- Prithvi as Nadir
- Subbiraj as Ashfaque's Father-in-law
- Paidi Jairaj as Rukhsar's Father
- Chandrashekhar as Nadir's Father
- Kunickaa Sadanand as Nagina Bai
- Roopesh Kumar as Qawwali Host
- Sanjay Dutt as Guest Appearance

== Music ==
Ravindra Jain wrote all the lyrics.

Song	Singer
"Is Nazar Ne"	Kumar Sanu
"Bewafa Ajnabee"	Kumar Sanu, Asha Bhosle
"Woh Vaada Hi"	Kumar Sanu, Sadhana Sargam
"Sanju Hai Naam"	Mohammed Aziz, Sadhana Sargam
"Mashooqa"	Mohammed Aziz
"Ek Raat Mein"	Sapna Mukherjee
