= Raaz Ki Baat =

1962 Indian Hindi-language film

- Directed by: Bolton C. Nagi
- Screenplay by: C. L. Kavish
- Story by: Bolton C. Nagi
- Produced by: N. A. Yusuf
- Starring: Sujit Kumar; Simi Garewal; Abhi Bhattacharya
- Music by: Robin Banerjee
- Production company: Zainab Pictures
- Distributed by: Al-Sabah International
- Release date: 1962
- Country: India
- Language: Hindi

Raaz Ki Baat (Hindi for A Secret Matter) is a 1962 Indian Hindi-language mystery-drama film directed by Bolton C. Nagi. Produced by N. A. Yusuf with story by the director, screenplay and dialogue by C. L. Kavish, and music by Robin Banerjee, it stars Sujit Kumar, Simi Garewal, and Abhi Bhattacharya in lead roles. The film revolves around family tensions and mistrust triggered by a brutal assault on a family member.

The film’s prominence arises from the role it played in the career paths of its lead stars. For Sujit Kumar, who would go on to become the first superstar of Bhojpuri films, Raaz Ki Baat marked the film where he made his debut role as a lead actor in a Hindi film. Simi Garewal, who would go on to become a director, producer, talk show hostess, and lead actress, made her debut in Hindi films in 1962 with the films Raaz Ki Baat and Son of India.

== Plot ==
Kishore Rai belongs to a rich family and lives with his elder brother Ashok Rai, Ashok’s wife, and their young son. Kishore meets a young woman, Kamal, and they fall in love, but Ashok strongly disapproves because Kamal’s sister, Ranjana, runs a nightclub and he considers this disreputable. Kishore insists on marrying Kamal, leading to a heated quarrel in which Ashok slaps Kishore and orders him to leave the house and not return.

Shortly afterward Ashok is found gravely wounded and hospitalized, and the police learn of the recent altercation between the brothers and arrest Kishore on suspicion. Kishore is held in custody until Ashok regains consciousness and can give a statement, and the suspense of the film turns on who actually attacked Ashok and whether he will accuse his own brother or reveal another culprit.

== Cast ==
- Sujit Kumar as Kishore Rai
- Simi Garewal as Kamal
- Abhi Bhattacharya as Ashok Rai
- Sulochana Latkar as Mrs. Ashok Rai
- Shyama as Ranjana
- Nagar Sultana as Kamal’s mother
- K. N. Singh as Police Commissioner Singh
- Hiralal as Mangaldas
- Mohan Choti as Pandurang Pyare
- Sabita Chatterjee as Pyari
- Sheikh as Hanumantrao Koli Pehelwan
- Madhumati
- Agha
- Chaman Puri as Bachchan Singh
- Ulhas

== Soundtrack ==
The film's music was composed by Robin Banerjee, with lyrics by Hairat Sitapuri.

No.	Song	Singers
1	"Zindagi Se Bhi Mujhko Ajeej Ho Tum"	Mohammed Rafi, Suman Kalyanpur
2	"Mamta Ki Baahon Mein Tujhko Sulaoon"	Suman Kalyanpur
3	"Do Ghadi Zara Chain Se Jeene Mujhe Hamraaz Do"	Mohammed Rafi
4	"Meri Ghaghri Mein Ghunghroo Laga De"	Asha Bhosle
5	"Mujhko Pehchano Mere Dard Ka Andaza Karo"	Asha Bhosle
6	"Thaam Mujhe Gir Na Jau"	Subir Sen
