= Intaqam =

- Poster
- Directed by: R. K. Nayyar
- Screenplay by: Dhruva Chatterjee; Madan Joshi (dialogues)
- Story by: R. K. Nayyar
- Produced by: Dewan A. D. Nayyar
- Starring: Ashok Kumar; Sanjay Khan; Sadhana
- Cinematography: K.H. Kapadia
- Edited by: Waman Bhosle; Gurudutt Shirali
- Music by: Laxmikant–Pyarelal
- Release date: 11 April 1969
- Country: India
- Language: Hindi
- Box office: 3.5 crore

Intaqam (transl. Revenge) is a 1969 Bollywood thriller film directed by R. K. Nayyar. It starred Sanjay Khan and Sadhana in the lead, supported by Ashok Kumar, Rehman, Jeevan, Rajendra Nath, Helen and Anju Mahendru.

The film also features the iconic cabaret number sung by Lata Mangeshkar, "Aa Jaane Jaan", a rarity through her long career. Choreographed by P. L. Raj. , the song remains one of the most popular dance numbers of Helen's career. The music was composed by Laxmikant–Pyarelal, with lyrics by Rajinder Krishan. All the songs were huge hit. Lata was nominated in the Filmfare Best Female Playback Singer category for her song "Kaise Rahun Chup", the only nomination for the film.

The film was an instant success at the box office and marked a return to form for actress Sadhana after illness in the film directed by her husband, an adaptation of the 1912 play Within the Law (play). Other film adaptations include the American film Paid starring Joan Crawford. Intaqam was remade into the Telugu film Pagabattina Paduchu (1971), starring Sharada (actress) and the Marathi film Naav Motha Lakshan Khota (1977)

== Plot ==
Reeta Mehra lives a modest life caring for her mother and working in a small store owned by a magnate, Sohanlal. One day, her boss tries to send her to a businessman to entertain him but she refuses. Angry, he informs Sohanlal who contrives to send her to jail for a year on trumped up charges of stealing jewelry from his shop.

On her release she finds that her mother has died so she pledges to take revenge on Sohanlal. Heeralal Mehra, who had escaped arrest a year earlier with Reeta's help comes to look for her. They retrieve the box he had given her to safeguard. To Reeta's surprise it contains valuable jewels. He tells her his story and how he was cheated by Sohanlal. Twenty years earlier, Heeralal had been convicted instead of Sohanlal and Sohanlal had promised to look after Heeralal's family. But when Heeralal returned he discovered that Sohanlal had just used the money for himself. He could not find his family.

Now both Reeta and Heeralal form a pact to take revenge on Sohanlal. They use Rajpal, Sohanlal's only son for that purpose. Rajpal, an innocent young man falls easily for Reeta. He marries her against his father's wishes. Later he learns that Reeta just wanted to use him, but he still loves her and asks her to forget everything. But Reeta and Heeralal disagree with him and publicly embarrass Sohanlal.

Annoyed and embarrassed, Sohanlal arranges a hitman for Reeta's murder. Heeralal, however manages to save Reeta, but Rajpal thinks that Reeta killed the hitman. He surrenders himself as the murderer. Heeralal won't tell the truth as he wants Sohanlal to suffer. Reeta realizes how much she loves Rajpal, unhappy that things have come so far. Just then Sohanlal sees a picture of Reeta's mother and recognizes her as Heeralal's wife. Heeralal finally realises that Reeta is his daughter and surrenders himself to the police to save Rajpal. He is acquitted as he killed to save an innocent person's life, but receives a one-year sentence for his previous crimes. The film ends with reconciliation all around.

== Cast ==
- Ashok Kumar as Heeralal Mehra
- Sanjay Khan as Rajpal (Raju)
- Sadhana as Reeta Mehra
- Rehman as Sohanlal
- Jeevan as Bankelal
- Helen as Rebecca
- Rajendra Nath as Pyarelal
- Anju Mahendru as Indu
- Asit Sen as Murlidhar Bansidhar
- Leela Chitnis as Mrs. Mehra
- Bhagwan Dada as Magician Pasha
- D. K. Sapru as Sohanlal's Lawyer
- Iftekhar as Police Inspector
- Dulari as Meena
- Jankidas as Heeralal's Employee

== Music ==
The music of the film was composed by duo Laxmikant–Pyarelal with lyrics by Rajinder Krishan. "Kaise Rahoon Chup" earned Lata a filmfare nomination.

Song	Singer
"Aa Jaan-E-Jaan"	Lata Mangeshkar
"Kaise Rahoon Chup"	Lata Mangeshkar
"Geet Tere Saaz Ka"	Lata Mangeshkar
"Mehfil Soyi Aisa Koi"	Lata Mangeshkar
"Hum Tumhare Liye, Tum Hamare Liye"	Lata Mangeshkar, Mohammed Rafi
"Jo Unki Tamanna"	Mohammed Rafi

=== Influence ===
A cover version of the song "Aa Jaane Jaan" was featured in film, Hello Darling (2010) as an item number performed by Celina Jaitley.
