= Newland House School =

Location
- Waldegrave Park; Twickenham, Greater London, TW1 4TQ; England; 51°26′01″N 0°20′03″W

Information
- Type: Independent school Preparatory school Co-educational; Day school Nursery school
- Motto: Innovate, Nurture, Inspire, Fly; Per Ardua ad Gloriam (Latin); Through work we achieve glory
- Religious affiliation: Church of England
- Established: 1897
- Founder: Francis Henry Newland Glossop
- Local authority: Richmond Borough Council
- Department for Education URN: 102934 Tables
- Chair of the Governors: Andrew Gumpert
- Head Master: Chris Skelton
- Age: 3 to 13
- Enrolment: 425 (approx.)
- Houses: Jupiter; Neptune; Saturn; Vulcan
- Colours: Red and Black
- Website: http://www.newlandhouse.net/

Newland House School is an independent co-educational preparatory school located in Twickenham, London, England.

== Introduction ==
Newland House School has over 440 pupils from the ages of three to thirteen, based in the Nursery (age 3-4), Pre-Prep (age 4-7) and Prep (age 7 to 11 for girls and 13 for boys). The school curriculum is broad, encompassing a range of academic subjects drawing on the strengths of the National Curriculum but with extended content to widen learning and an extra-curricular offering to complement the development of the whole child. The school provides specialist teaching and prepares pupils for entry to independent senior schools.

== Facilities ==
In September 2016, the school relocated the Pre-Prep into brand new premises immediately next door to the Prep part of the school. The design for the new building achieved the key features of BREEAM excellence. The Prep has an all weather sports pitch, netball court and cricket nets. The school has two science labs, a design Technology workshop, music hall and ICT suite. The school uses off-site sports facilities at Bushy Park Sports Club and Teddington Rugby Club in Bushy Park. There is access to the school via Teddington Park Road and the school's Nursery is located at 11 Waldegrave Park.

== Structure ==
Children can join the Nursery which is the year prior to joining the school in Reception. The Nursery is term-time, open five days per week for children aged 3 to 4 years. Children may attend either five mornings sessions, five full day sessions or five mornings sessions plus a minimum of two afternoon sessions. There are two classes in the Nursery of around 15 children. The school has 3-form entry all the way through from Reception to Year 6 with the Nursery and Reception being the main entry points. There are no additional defined entry points and all children in Year 2 in the Pre-Prep automatically transfer to Year 3 in the Prep School. Girls leave the school at the end of Year 6, aged 11. Boys, usually stay for a further two years and leave at the end of Year 8 to move into Year 9 in senior school (aged 13). Some pupils to join at the beginning of Year 7.

== History ==
Newland House School was founded in 1897 at Newland House in Oak Lane, Twickenham. The Vicar of Twickenham, George Glossop and his family, who lived at Amyand House, commissioned the architect, Robert W. Edis, FSA, to build them a new home in the grounds of their house and they moved into the newly-built property in 1871. The house was named after Reverend Glossop’s mother, who had died in 1870: her maiden name was Newland.

On its opening in 1897, the new school is believed to have been briefly named 'Amyand House School' in memory of Glossop's earlier home, but soon took the name of the building it occupied, to become known as 'The Newland House School'. It moved to a larger site in Strawberry Hill Road, Twickenham, in about 1930 and then to its present site in Waldegrave Park between 1944 and 1945, when for a time it also became known as 'Twickenham Grammar School'.

From 1888, the original house at 32 Waldegrave Park, on which the existing main school building is based, was known as 'Heriotdene', and became the home of Henry Cheers, a highly successful Victorian and Edwardian architect from Chester, who designed many schools, town halls and libraries across England: among them Hull Northern Library in 1895; the 'Victoria Jubilee Technical School' of Preston, Lancashire, in 1897 (since renamed the 'Harris Building', and now forming the main administrative block of the University of Central Lancashire); Chorley Training College in 1905 (now Chorley Public Library); and town halls from Oswestry and Halifax to Hereford and East Ham. He also designed several chapels and churches and the original Carnegie Library, Teddington in 1906. The current Head is Chris Skelton who was appointed in September 2019 and was formerly Deputy Head (Academic) at Newton Prep School.

== Notable former pupils ==
- Chemmy Alcott, Alpine ski racer competing on the World Cup circuit in all five disciplines: downhill, super G, giant slalom, slalom, and combined. Competed in three Winter Olympic Games and six FIS World Championships and overall Senior British National Champion five times (2002, 2003, 2005, 2007, 2008).
- Simi Garewal, Indian actress
- Oliver Golding, tennis player and former child actor
- Patsy Kensit, actress
- Stephen Milligan, Conservative politician and journalist
- Edward Sinclair, swimmer
- Tanya Gold, journalist and author
