= K. Vaikunth =

Indian cinematographer (1925–2003)

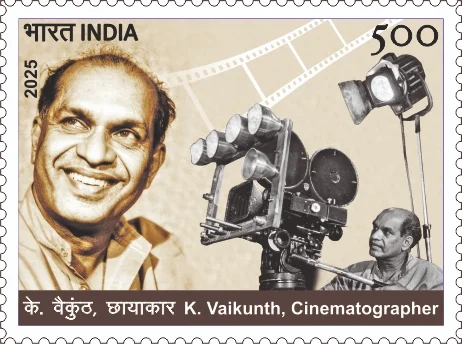
- K Vaikunth on a 2025 stamp of India
- Born: Vaikunth Dattaram Kuncolienkar; 25 August 1925; Margão, Goa, Portuguese India
- Died: 9 February 2003 (aged 77); Mumbai
- Occupation: cinematographer
- Spouse: Chhaya
- Children: K Atish (son)
- Website: https://kvaikunth.com

Vaikunth Dattaram Kuncolienkar (25 August 1925 – 9 February 2003), known professionally as K. Vaikunth, was an Indian cinematographer who worked primarily in Hindi films between 1956 and 1990. He worked with well-known directors like Hrishikesh Mukherjee, Ramesh Sippy, Gulzar, Manmohan Desai, Ramanand Sagar, and Ravindra Dave.

He served as a cinematographer on several popular and critically acclaimed movies. These include Mere Sanam (1965), Raaz (1967), Bandhan (1969), Andaz (1971), Parichay (1972), Seeta Aur Geeta (1972), Achanak (1973), Roti (1974), Aandhi (1975), Khushboo (1975), Mausam (1975), and Meera (1979).

Bandhan (1969), Andaz, and Seeta Aur Geeta (1972) had successful runs in theaters for a significant period.

Vaikunth also worked with leading documentary film makers such as Paul Zils, S. Sukhdev, and Rajbhans Khanna.

In a career spanning more than five decades, Vaikunth worked on more than 35 feature films, apart from ads and documentaries.

Many film heroines of the time have credited Vaikunth for making them look as beautiful as possible on screen.

== Early life and career ==
K Vaikunth was born Vaikunth Dattaram Kuncolienkar in Margao on 25 August 1925. In the late 1940s, he assisted cinematographer Surendra Pai on Bari Behen (1949) and Pandurang Naik. During this time, he adopted the simpler screen name K Vaikunth.

Garam Coat (1956), directed by Amar Kumar, was Vaikunth's first feature film as a cinematographer. His first documentary was The Story of Kashmir, produced and directed by Rajbhans Khanna.

== Awards ==
Vaikunth received the Filmfare Award for Best Cinematography in 1973 for Seeta Aur Geeta.

Feature films photographed by him—Garam Coat (1956), Mausam (1975), Aandhi (1975), Seeta Aur Geeta (1972), Parichay (1972), and Andaz (1971)—have won 5 Filmfare awards and 4 national awards, apart from receiving various nominations.

The documentary And Miles to Go, produced by S. Sukhdev and shot by Vaikunth, won the National Film Award for Best Non-Feature Film in 1964. It also won the Bengal Tiger Award at the third International Film Festival of India (IFFI) in 1965. The documentaries The Story of Kashmir and The Great Betrayal won the President's Medal and other international awards.

On 27 November 2025, India post released a commemorative postage stamp honouring K. Vaikunth.

== Personal life ==
Vaikunth was married to Chhaya. His son, K Atish, also known as Atish Kuncolienkar, a noted cinematographer, died on 8 April 2024.

== Filmography ==
As cinematographer/director of photography (feature films)

- Garam Coat (1956)
- Rungoli (1956)
- Char Diwari (1961)
- Mere Sanam (1965)
- Gaban(1966)
- Raaz (1967)
- Mere Hamdam Mere Dost (1968)
- Bandhan (1969)
- Kab? Kyoon? Aur Kahan? (1970)
- Andaz (1971)
- Mere Apne (1971)
- Parichay (1972)
- Koshish (1972)
- Seeta Aur Geeta (1972)
- Achanak (1973)
- Roti (1974)
- Aandhi (1975)
- Khushboo (1975)
- Mausam (1975)
- Vir Mangdavalo (1976)
- Meera (1979)
- Heera Moti (1979)
- Baghavat (1982)
- Baadal (1985)
- Salma (1985)
- Nasamajh (1986)
- Haatim Tai (1990)

As cinematographer (non-feature films)

- New Life of a Displaced Person (Ek Visthapit Vyakti Ki Nai Zindagi) – dir: Paul Zils
- Maa – The Story of an Unmarried Mother (1956) – dir: Paul Zils
- Mayurakshi Dam (1958) – dir: N.K. Issar
- The Evolution and Races of Man (1961) – dir: S. Sukhdev
- Cotton Processing – The Cooperative Way (1963) – dir: Homi D. Sethna
- Frontiers of Freedom (1964) – dir: S. Sukhdev
- The Great Betrayal (1965) – dir: Rajbhans Khanna
- A Modern Buddhist Pilgrimage (1965)
- The Story of Kashmir (1966) – dir: Rajbhans Khanna
- And Miles to Go (1967) – dir: S. Sukhdev
- Shadow Across the East (1968)
- Khilone Wala (1971) dir: S. Sukhdev

As director (non-feature films)

- Goa Marches (1977)
- Protecting the Workers (1979)
- Goa After Liberation
- Goa Marches On
- Aamche Bhau
