= Zindagi Ek Safar Hai =

Song by Kishore Kumar

from the album Andaz
- Language: Hindi
- Released: 1971
- Length: 4:22
- Label: Saregama
- Composer: Shankar Jaikishan
- Lyricist: Hasrat Jaipuri

"Zindagi Ek Safar Hai" (transl. Life is a journey) is a song from the Hindi film Andaz, composed by the duo of Shankar Jaikishan, written by Hasrat Jaipuri and sung by Kishore Kumar. The song topped the annual list of Binaca Geetmala for 1971.

== Picturization ==
In the film, Rajesh Khanna features in the Happy Version of the song sung by Kishore Kumar. The second version sung by Mohammad Rafi features Shammi Kapoor, Hema Malini and Rajesh Khanna

== Awards ==
- 19th Filmfare Awards
  - Best Lyricist: Hasrat Jaipuri: Won
  - Best Male Singer: Kishore Kumar: Nominated

== Trivia ==
- There are four versions of this song. The other two versions were sung by Asha Bhosle & Mohammad Rafi. Other version is Malaysian/Indonesian parody created by GedengKartun Channel.
- This song also features in 2002 movie Mujhse Dosti Karoge! in the song "The Medley" where Sonu Nigam lends his voice.
