= Do Badan =

- Directed by: Raj Khosla
- Screenplay by: G.R. Kamat; Virendra Sinha (dialogue); Chandrakant Kakodkar (additional dialogue)
- Story by: M. Mashhadi
- Produced by: Huda Bihari
- Starring: Manoj Kumar; Asha Parekh; Simi Garewal; Pran
- Cinematography: V. N. Reddy
- Edited by: Govind Dalwadi; D. N. Pai
- Music by: Ravi
- Release date: 1966
- Country: India
- Language: Hindi

Do Badan (English: Two Bodies) is a 1966 Hindi film directed by Raj Khosla and starring Manoj Kumar, Asha Parekh, Simi Garewal, Pran. The music is by Ravi.

The film idea was suggested by Manoj Kumar, who asked Khosla to accompany him for a show of Deedar (1951), directed by Nitin Bose, which was having a rerun in local theatres. Thereafter, the story of Do Badan was written after reworking its story line and the screenplay was written by G.R. Kamat. It was commercially hit and Simi Garewal got best supporting actress Film fare award. Film songs were great hit and still very popular.

== Plot ==
Vikas (Manoj Kumar) from a poor family is a conscientious college student hoping to find work and support his family. He meets with wealthy Asha (Asha Parekh) and they fall in love. During the exams, Vikas is called away to his father's funeral and is unable to complete his studies. But Asha manages to find him work with her father. Asha's father unknowingly announces her engagement to Ashwin.

He soon discovers that Asha is in love with Vikas. An accident is arranged for Vikas but he survives albeit without his eyesight. Vikas feels he cannot be a burden to Asha. Ashwin tells Asha that Vikas has died in the accident. Asha is bereft. So Ashwin meets Vikas and advises him to convince Asha that he does not love her any more. Vikas agrees and tells Asha that he is having an affair with Dr. Anjali. Asha marries Ashwin but refuses to live as wife to him.

Vikas becomes a singer and is seen by Asha at a hotel event. Asha learns the real story about his true love and Ashwin's jealousy from Dr Anjali. Asha tries to apologize to Vikas but is stopped by Ashwin.

Vikas refuses all endearments for his sight to be corrected. Dr. Anjali visits Asha to ask her to persuade Vikas to undergo the operation. As she attempts to do so, Asha is snatched away by Ashwin and locked away.

Asha's uncle meets her. Saddened by her condition, he takes her to her father's home. But her state worsens, the doctors in despair. Meanwhile, Vikas's sight is restored. Ashwin apologizes to Asha. He then goes to Vikas and tells him about Asha's condition. Together they go to Asha. She takes a final look at Vikas and dies. He is unable to bear the loss and also dies. Ashwin and Asha's family find Vikas and Asha together at last.

== Cast ==
- Manoj Kumar as Vikas
- Asha Parekh as Asha
- Simi Garewal as Dr. Anjali
- Pran as Ashwini
- Manmohan Krishna as Asha's Uncle
- Mohan Choti as Mohan
- Dhumal as Mohan's Father
- Shivraj as Doctor
- Birbal as Co-Student with Mohan
- Lalita Kumari as Kamla
- Mridula Rani as Asha's Aunty
- Surekha Pandit as Ashwini's Sister
- Uma Khosla as Asha's Friend

== Soundtrack ==
The songs of the movie were huge hits. The music was composed by Ravi and the lyrics were authored by Shakeel Badayuni, with memorable songs such as "Bhari Duniya Mein Aakhir Dil Ko Samjhane Kahan Jaye", "Naseeb Main Jiske Jo Likha Tha", "Raha Gardishon Mein Hardam Mere Ishq Ka Sitara" rendered into tracks by the mesmerizing voice of Mohammed Rafi; "Lo Aa Gayi Unki Yaad Woh Nahin Aaye" by Lata Mangeshkar and "Jab Chali Thandi Hawa" by Asha Bhosle.

Song	Singer	Raga
"Bhari Duniya Mein"	Mohammed Rafi	Bhairavi (Hindustani)
"Naseeb Mein Jiske Jo"	Mohammed Rafi	
"Raha Gardishon Mein"	Mohammed Rafi	Darbari Kanada
"Lo Aa Gayi Unki Yaad"	Lata Mangeshkar	
"Jab Chali Thandi Hawa"	Asha Bhosle	
"Mat Jaiyo Naukariya"	Asha Bhosle	

== Awards and nominations ==
- Filmfare Best Supporting Actress Award--Simi Garewal
- Filmfare Nomination for Best Music Director--Ravi
- Filmfare Nomination for Best Lyricist--Shakeel Badayuni for the song "Naseeb Mein Jiske"
- Filmfare Nomination for Best Playback Singer--Lata Mangeshkar for the song "Lo

Aa Gayi
