= Paappi Devataa =

- Theatrical release poster
- Directed by: Harmesh Malhotra
- Written by: Dr.Rahi Masoom Raza (dialogue)
- Screenplay by: Ravi Kapoor
- Produced by: M.M. Malhotra; Baldev Pushkarna
- Starring: Dharmendra; Jeetendra; Jaya Prada; Madhuri Dixit
- Cinematography: Shyam Rao
- Edited by: Harish Chaudhary
- Music by: Laxmikant Pyarelal
- Production company: Kala Bharti
- Release date: 14 July 1995
- Running time: 139 minutes
- Country: India
- Language: Hindi
- Budget: ₹15 million
- Box office: ₹16 million

Paappi Devataa (transl. Sinners – Goddess; Hindi: पापी देवता) is a 1995 Indian Hindi-language action crime film, produced by M. M. Malhotra and Baldev Pushkarna and directed by Harmesh Malhotra. It stars Dharmendra, Jeetendra, Jaya Prada, Madhuri Dixit and music composed by Laxmikant Pyarelal. Initially Vinod Khanna was to do the film but he was replaced by Jeetendra. The film was started in 1990 but was delayed for 5 years. It was finally released on 14 July 1995, and was a critical and commercial failure.

== Plot ==
Paappi Devataa is about Ram Kumar Singha, an unemployed guy, arrives in Bombay and loses his luggage. During that plight, a benevolent taxi driver, Rahim, comforts him in his driver's colony, and they befriend him. Rahim earns much respect in that area and loves his neighbor, Rosy. After a while, as a bowl over, Ram is a CBI officer appointed to solve a murder case of MLA Niranjan Das made by a truck driver. Due to concerns, Rahim places his mother and sister Reshma separately, and Ram falls for his Reshma unbeknownst. Stunningly, Ram discovers Rahim to be the convict and learns he works for Don Ratan Seth. However, Ram stands firm, and Rahim surrenders when he seeks the underlying cause, then Rahim rearward. He used to work as a truck driver in a transport company owned by Niranjan Das and Ratan Seth and finds out those underworld activities are carried out in its garb. So, Rahim questioned Ratan Seth, and in tandem, a dispute arose between the partners as Ratan Seth defrauded the company. Exploiting it, Ratan Seth intrigues Rahim by infuriating him against Niranjan Das and incriminates him for his killing. Now, Ram ensures Rahim and, with his support, seizes the empire of Ratan Seth. At that point, incensed Ratan Seth seeks to kill Rahim when his mother dies. Thus, Rahim onslaughts and ceases Ratan Seth. At last, Ram acquits Rahim as an approver. Finally, the movie ends on a happy note with the marriages of Ram to Reshma and Rahim to Rosy.

== Cast ==
- Dharmendra as Rahim Khan
- Jeetendra as Ram Kumar Singh worked as DCP mumbai police
- Jaya Prada as Rosy
- Madhuri Dixit as Reshma
- Amrish Puri as Ratan Seth
- Ashalata Wabgaonkar as Rosie's mother
- Satyendra Kapoor as Niranjan Das
- Roopesh Kumar as Kundan
- Sharat Saxena as Ratan's employee
- Gurbachchan Singh as Gulzar Singh
- Yunus Parvez as Kelaram
- Shail Chaturvedi as train passenger
- Urmila Bhatt as Mrs. Khan
- Birbal as Havaldar
- Vinod Nagpal as Pandu

== Soundtrack ==
The music of the film was composed by Laxmikant Pyarelal.

#	Title	Singer(s)
1	"Uska Naam Hai Piya"	Alka Yagnik
2	"Dur Desh Se Ek Pardesi Aayega"	Shobha Joshi
3	"Kuch Main Kahoon"	Mohammad Aziz
4	"Jhoom Raha Hai"	Shabbir Kumar, Alka Yagnik
5	"Sawan Ke Badlo Ki Niyat"	Mohammad Aziz, Alka Yagnik
6	"Sawan Ke Badlo Ki Niyat"	Instrumental
7	"Dur Desh Se Ek Pardesi Aayega"	Instrumental
