= Naach Uthe Sansaar =

- Poster
- Directed by: Yakub Hasan Rizvi
- Starring: Shashi Kapoor; Hema Malini; Simi Garewal; Aruna Irani
- Music by: Laxmikant–Pyarelal
- Release date: 1976
- Country: India
- Language: Hindi

Naach Uthe Sansaar (lit. 'The world begins dancing') is a 1976 Bollywood romance film directed by Yakub Hasan Rizvi.

== Cast ==
- Shashi Kapoor as Karmu
- Hema Malini as Nanki Mehto
- Simi Garewal as Somu
- Aruna Irani as Nital
- Roopesh Kumar as Johny
- Chandrima Bhaduri as Mrs. Mehto
- Rajan Haksar as Catholic Priest
- Leela Mishra as Karmu's Mother
- Rajendra Nath as Trithu
- Bhushan Tiwari as Vaidraj Mehto
- Ramayan Tiwari as Jaggu Mehto

== Production ==
Naach Uthe Sansaar was in the making for six years.

Lyrics by : Majrooh Sultanpuri

== Soundtrack ==
#	Song	Singer
1	"O Diljaaniya"	Mohammed Rafi
2	"Aaja Re Aaja"	Mohammed Rafi
3	"Logwa Kahe Mujhe"	Mohammed Rafi
4	"Sukhi Dharti Dhool Udaaye"	Mohammed Rafi
5	"Tere Sang Jeena, Tere Sang Marna"	Mohammed Rafi, Lata Mangeshkar
6	"Naach Uthe Sansaar"	Mohammed Rafi, Lata Mangeshkar
