= Roopesh Kumar =

Indian film actor and director (1946-1995)

- Roopesh Kumar in Jeevan Mrityu (1970)
- Born: Abbas Farashahi; 16 January 1946; Bombay, Bombay Presidency, British India
- Died: 29 January 1995 (aged 49); Bombay, Maharashtra, India
- Occupations: Actor, producer, director
- Years active: 1965-1995

Roopesh Kumar (born as Abbas Farashahi; 16 January 1946 – 29 January 1995) was a character actor in Bollywood films, especially known for his role as a villain in over 100 Hindi films from 1965 to 1995. He is widely remembered for his comic as well as negative roles in the films like Seeta Aur Geeta and The Great Gambler. He was the cousin of actress Mumtaz.

== Personal life ==
Roopesh Kumar was born in Mumbai as Abbas Farashahi on 16 January 1946. He was the eldest child of Ali Asgar Farashahi (Asgar Seth of Pune City, Mandai) and Mariam. He was a student of Dastur School in Pune. From his early childhood he was interested in acting. His family were in the restaurant and bakery business in Pune but he chose to be an actor. Kumar was fondly known as Dadash (meaning brother in Persian). He was very close to his cousin actresses Mumtaz and Malika. His oldest daughter is married to Dilip Kumar's nephew Zahid Khan and they have two children.

On 29 January 1995, Kumar suffered a heart attack while attending an awards ceremony with Sunil Dutt and Rajendra Kumar and was rushed to hospital. He died in the ambulance on the way to the hospital at the age of 49.

== Career ==
He started his career with Tarzan and King Kong in 1965 and went on to play supporting roles of mostly villains throughout the 1970s and 1980s. His most well known films include Andaz (1971), Seeta Aur Geeta (1972), Chacha Bhatija (1977), The Great Gambler (1979), Jaani Dushman (1979), Hum Paanch (1980), Bade Dilwala (1983) and Guru (1989). He also produced and directed two films, Hai Meri Jaan (1991) and Meri Aan (1993). His last film release was Paappi Devataa in 1995, the same year of his death.

== Filmography ==
- Rustom E Hind (1965)
- Main Wohi Hoon (1966) as Rajan
- Mere Hamdam Mere Dost(1968) as Guest in Party (Cameo Role)
- Sapno Ka Saudagar (1968) as Kumar Prannath Singh
- Aadmi Aur Insaan (1969) as Abdul Rashid
- Jeene Ki Raah (1969) as Ramdas
- Sharafat (1970) as Arun
- Jeevan Mrityu (1970) as Sameer
- Preet Ki Dori (1971) as Ramu
- Kal Aaj Aur Kal (1971) as Sunny
- Andaz (1971) as Badal
- Raampur Ka Lakshman (1972) as Chhaganlal Pandey
- Seeta Aur Geeta (1972) as Ranjeet
- Loafer (1973) as Rakesh
- Joshila (1973) as Dinesh
- Prabhat (1973) as Ramesh
- Aashiana (1974)
- Insaaniyat (1974) as Girdharilal
- Paap Aur Punya (1974) as Tiger's Associate
- Zinda Dil (1975) as Ghanshyam Thakur
- Mere Sartaj (1975) as Asad
- Nagin (1976) as Meena's Husband
- Naach Uthe Sansaar (1976) as Johnny
- Phir Janam Lenge Hum (1977) as Hameed
- Jay Vejay (1977) as King Diler Jung
- Chacha Bhatija (1977) as Kiran
- Dildaar (1977) as Prasad
- Karm (1977) as Premnath
- Kasam Khoon Ki (1977) as Sher Singh
- Doosra Aadmi (1977) as Roopesh
- Amar Shakti (1978) as Kumar Ranjeet Narayan Singh
- Amar Deep (1979) as Ramesh
- Jaani Dushman (1979) as Shera's Uncle
- The Great Gambler (1979) as Sethi
- Lok Parlok (1979) as Hotel's Manager
- Choron Ki Baaraat (1980) as Jaggu
- Red Rose as Inspector Bhushan
- Hum Paanch (1980) as Vijay
- Guest House (1980) as Kantilal
- Do Premee (1980) as Suresh
- Insaan (1982) as Roopa
- Nishaan (1983) as Veeru
- Souten (1983) as Bingo
- Bade Dilwala (1983) as Prem
- Maati Maangey Khoon (1984)
- Aasmaan (1984)
- Asha Jyoti (1984) as Hukamchand
- Hum Dono (1985) as Jimmy
- Babu (1985 film) as Jaggu Dada
- Pyar Jhukta Nahin (1985) as Rohit Prasad
- Preeti (1986)
- Muddat (1986) as Bhagwat Singh
- Insaaf Ki Awaaz (1986) as Mahendranath
- Loha (1987) as Prisoner
- Daku Hasina (1987) as Rana
- Zakhmi Aurat(1988) as Raj
- Kasam (1988) as Police Officer
- Guru (1989) as Roopesh
- Daata (1989) as G.D.'s Employee
- Mujrim (1989) as Gulati
- Sachai Ki Taqat (1989) as Rekha's Brother
- Jurrat (1989) as Girdhar
- Karishma Kali Kaa (1990) as Inspector Ganpat Godbole
- Haar Jeet (1990 film)
- Yeh Aag Kab Bujhegi (1991) as Kanhaiyalal Gupta
- Pratigyabadh (1991) as Tej Bahadur "Teja"
- Hai Meri Jaan (1991) as Prajapati (Producer & Director of the Film)
- Meri Aan (1993) as Qawwali Host (Producer & Director of the Film)
- Aa Gale Lag Jaa (1994) as Satish Khanna
- Paappi Devataa (1995) as Kundan

=== Television ===
Year	Serial	Role	Channel	Notes
1986	Bahadur Shah Zafar	Hakim Ahsanullah Khan	DD National	
