= Rajinder Singh Bedi =

Indian author, director and screenwriter (1915-1984)

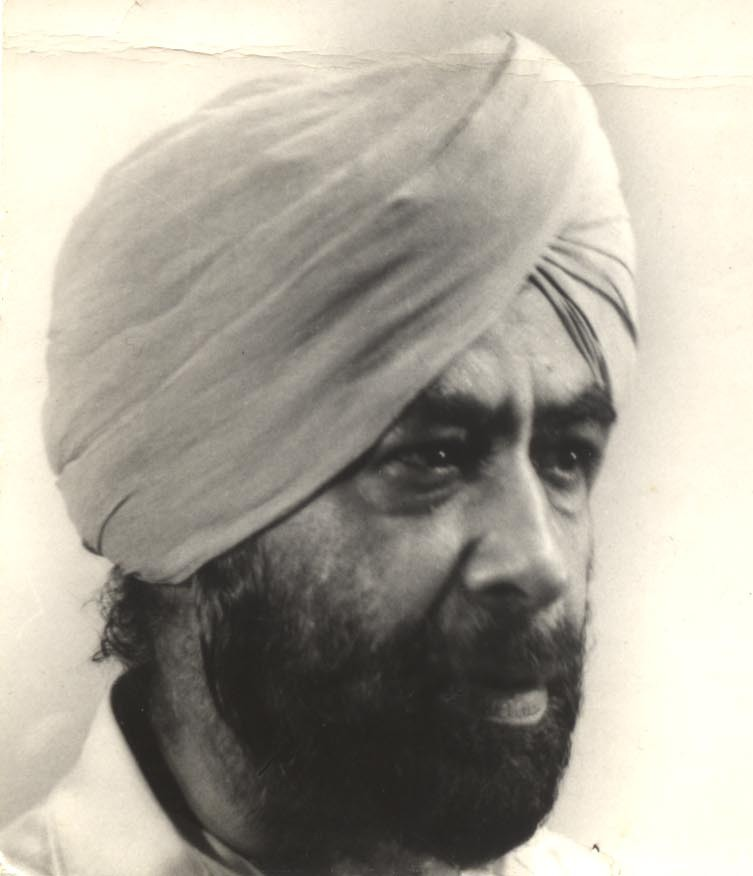
- Bedi in the early 1960s
- Born: Rajinder Singh Bedi; 1 September 1915; Sialkot, Punjab, British India
- Died: 11 November 1984 (aged 69); Mumbai, Maharashtra, India
- Occupations: Novelist, playwright, film director, screenwriter
- Years active: 1933–1984
- Relatives: Narendra Bedi (son); Manek Bedi (grandson); Rajat Bedi (grandson)
- Awards: 1959 Filmfare Best Dialogue Award:Madhumati (1958); 1971 Filmfare Best Dialogue Award:Satyakam (1969); 1965 Sahitya Akademi Award

Rajinder Singh Bedi (1 September 1915 – 11 November 1984) was an Indian Urdu writer of the progressive writers' movement and a playwright, who later worked in Hindi cinema as a film director, screenwriter and dialogue writer and he is grandfather to Rajat Bedi and Manek Bedi.

As a screenwriter and dialogue writer, he is best known for Hrishikesh Mukherjee's films Abhimaan, Anupama and Satyakam; and Bimal Roy's Madhumati. As a director he is known for Dastak (1970), starring Sanjeev Kumar and Rehana Sultan and Phagun (1973), starring Dharmendra, Waheeda Rehman, Jaya Bhaduri and Vijay Arora. He wrote his scripts in Urdu, like a number of other prominent screenwriters at the time.

Bedi is considered one of the leading 20th century progressive writers of Urdu fiction, and one of the most prominent Urdu fiction writers. He is most known for 'disturbing' Partition of India tales.

== Biography ==
=== Early life ===
Bedi was born in village Dhallewali in Sialkot district, Punjab, now in Pakistan, to Hira Singh Bedi and Seva Dai. He spent his early years in Lahore, where he received his education in Urdu, as it was common to most Punjabi families, though he never graduated from a college.

=== Career ===
His first collection of short stories, Daan-O-Daam (The Catch), featuring his prominent story "Garam Coat" (Warm Coat) was published in 1940. In 1942, he published his second collection of short stories, Grehan (The Eclipse).

In 1943, he joined Maheshwari Films, a small Lahore film studio, although after one and half years he returned to All India Radio and was posted to Jammu, where he worked until 1947, and became the Director of Jammu and Kashmir Broadcasting Service. By the time of Partition Rajinder Singh Bedi had published numerous more short stories, and had made a name for himself as a prolific writer. His Urdu novel, Ek Chadar Maili Si, translated into English as I Take This Woman, by Khushwant Singh received the Sahitya Akademi Award in 1965. The book was later translated into Hindi, Kashmiri and Bengali.

His later collections of short stories were Kokh Jali and Apne Dukh Mujhe Dedo and a collection of plays, Saat Khel.

=== Films ===
After the partition of India in 1947, he moved to Bombay, and started working with D. D. Kashyap and got his first screen credit for dialogue, in the 1949 film Badi Bahen, although he received greater recognition for his second film Daag, a 1952 film.

In 1954, he joined with Amar Kumar, Balraj Sahni, Geeta Bali and others to create a new company called Cine Cooperative. In 1955, it produced its first film, Garam Coat. Based on Bedi's short story Garam Coat, starring Balraj Sahni and Nirupa Roy, and directed by Aman Kumar, the film gave Bedi the chance to write an entire screenplay.

Their second film, Rangoli (1962), starring Kishore Kumar, Vyjayantimala, and Durga Khote, was also directed by Amar Kumar.

He continued to display his range in dialogue writing styles in many classic Hindi films, starting with Sohrab Modi's Mirza Ghalib (1954), Bimal Roy's Devdas (1955), and Madhumati (1958); Amar Kumar and Hrishikesh Mukherjee's films, Anuradha (1960), Anupama (1966), Satyakam (1969) and Abhimaan (1973).

He made his directorial debut with Hindi classic Dastak (1970), starring Sanjeev Kumar and Rehana Sultan, with music by Madan Mohan, and in the following decade he directed three more films: Phagun (1973), Nawab Sahib (1978) and Aankhin Dekhi (1978).

His novella Ek Chadar Maili Si was made into a film in Pakistan, Mutthi Bhar Chawal (1978) and later in India, as Ek Chadar Maili Si (1986).

His son Narender Bedi was also a film director and the maker of films including Jawani Diwani (1972), Benaam (1974), Rafoo Chakkar (1975), and Sanam Teri Kasam (1982). He died in 1982, a few years after Bedi's wife. Thereafter, Bedi's health consistently deteriorated. He suffered paralysis in 1982 and died in Bombay two years later.

His short story 'Lajwanti' was made into a telefilm, by Neena Gupta in 2006.

== Legacy ==
In his memory, the Government of Punjab has started a "Rajinder Singh Bedi Award" in the field of Urdu Literature.

== Filmography ==
- Ek Chadar Maili Si (1986) – Story
- Aankhon Dekhi (1978) – Director
- Mutthi Bhar Chawal (1978) – Story
- Nawab Sahib (1978) – Director
- Phagun (1973) – Director, producer
- Abhimaan (1973) – Dialogue
- Grahan (1972) – Story
- Dastak (1970)- Direction, screenwriter
- Satyakam (1969) – Dialogue
- Pyasi Sham (1969) - Story
- Mere Hamdam Mere Dost (1968) – Screenwriter
- Baharon Ke Sapne (1967) – Dialogue
- Anupama (1966) – Dialogue
- Mere Sanam (1965) – Screenwriter, Dialogue
- Rangoli (1962) – Dialogue, screenwriter, Producer
- Aas Ka Panchhi (1961) – Screenwriter
- Mem-Didi (1961) - Screenwriter
- Anuradha (1960) – Dialogue
- Bombai Ka Baboo (1960) – Dialogue
- Madhumati (1958)- Dialogue
- Mirza Sahiba (1957) Story and Dialogues
- Musafir (1957) _ Dialogue
- Basant Bahar (1956) – Dialogue
- Milap (1955) – Dialogue
- Garam Coat (1955) – Dialogue, screenwriter, producer
- Devdas (1955) – Dialogue
- Mirza Ghalib (1954)- Dialogue
- Daag (1952) – Dialogue
- Aaram - Dialogue (1951)
- Badi Bahen (1949) – Dialogue

== Awards ==
=== Films ===
- 1956 Filmfare Best Story Award: Garam Coat (1955)
- 1959 Filmfare Best Dialogue Award: Madhumati (1958)
- 1971 Filmfare Best Dialogue Award:Satyakam (1969)

=== Literary awards ===
- 1965 Sahitya Akademi Award Urdu :Ek Chadar Maili Si ('I Take This Woman')
- 1978 Ghalib Award – Urdu Drama.

== Bibliography ==
- I Take This Woman. Penguin India. ISBN 0-14-024048-9.
- Rajinder Singh Bedi: Selected Short Stories (In English). New Delhi: Sahitya Akademi, 1989.
- Give Me Your Sorrows trans. Leonard, Karen, Indian Literature, Delhi, 1968.
- Grahan (Urdu). Maktaba Jamia, 1992.
- Garam Kot (Urdu). Sang-e-Meel Publications.
- Majmua Rajindar Singh Bedi. Sang-e-Meel Publications.
- Sat Khel. Maktaba Jamia, 1982.
- Dastak. Hind Pocket Book, 1971.
- The Penguin Book of Classic Urdu Stories. Penguin, 2006. ISBN 0-670-99936-9.
- Lajwanti, Land of five rivers. Orient Paperbacks Delhi, 1956.

== Work on Rajinder Singh Bedi ==
- Rajinder Singh Bedi: Shakhsiyat aur Fan by Jagdish Chander Wadhawan, 1999, Educational Publishing House, ISBN 81-87667-00-1.
- Rajinder Singh Bedi: A Study, by Varis Hussain Alvi. 2006.
- Rajinder Singh Bedi Sounds and Whispers: Reflections on the Literary Scene, 1984–86, by Abulkhair Kashfi, Syed Abu Ahmad Akif. Asasa Books, 1991. Chapter 25 – "Rajinder Singh Bedi:The Last Pillar Of Modem Urdu Short Story", page 111.
- Progressive Filmmaker: Films of Rajinder Singh Bedi – Annual of Urdu Studies
- India Partitioned: The Other Face of Freedom, edited by Mushirul Hasan. New Delhi, Roli Books, 1995
- Shadow Lives: Writings on Widowhood, edited by Uma Chakravarti and Preeti Gill. Kali for Women, New Delhi. 2002.

== See also ==
- Urdu literature
