= Simi Garewal =

Indian actress (born 1940)

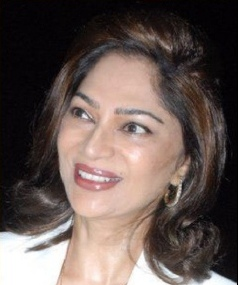
- Garewal in 2012
- Born: Simrita Garewal; 17 October 1940 (age 86); Ludhiana, Punjab, India
- Occupations: Film actress, producer, director, talk show hostess
- Years active: 1962–2011
- Spouse: Ravi Mohan (m. 1970; div. 1979)
- Relatives: Pamela Chopra (First cousin)
- Website: www.simigarewal.com

Simi Garewal (born Simrita Garewal; 17 October 1940) is an Indian director, producer, talk show hostess, and former actress.

She is known for her work in Hindi films like Do Badan (1966), Saathi (1968), Mera Naam Joker (1970), Siddhartha (1972), Karz (1980) and the Punjabi film Udeekaan. She also acted in the Bengali films Aranyer Din Ratri directed by Satyajit Ray and Padatik by Mrinal Sen. She is also known for her celebrity talk show, Rendezvous with Simi Garewal.

== Early life ==
Garewal was born in Ludhiana on 17 October 1940. Her father, Brigadier J. S. Garewal served in the Indian Army. Simi is a cousin of Pamela Chopra, wife of director Yash Chopra. Simi's mother Darshi and Pamela's father Mohinder Singh were siblings. Simi grew up in England and studied at Newland House School with her sister Amrita.

== Film and television career ==
After spending much of her childhood in England, Garewal returned to India while a teenager. Her fluency in the English language induced the makers of the English-language film Tarzan Goes to India to offer her a role. Garewal made her debut alongside Feroz Khan in this film released in 1962. Her performance was good enough for her to fetch many more film offers. During the 1960s and '70s, she starred in several notable Indian films, working with leading directors such as with Mehboob Khan in Son of India (1962), Raj Khosla in Do Badan (1966), Raj Kapoor in Mera Naam Joker (1970), Satyajit Ray in Aranyer Din Ratri (1970, Days and Nights in the Forest) and Mrinal Sen in Padatik (1973, The Guerilla Fighter). She starred opposite Shashi Kapoor in Columbia Pictures' Siddhartha (1972), an English-language movie based on the novel by Hermann Hesse. Garewal performed a nude scene in this film which caused some controversy in India and was only released for exhibition after complying with cuts ordered by the Indian Censor Board. Later, in the mid-1970s, she made an appearance in the popular film Kabhi Kabhie (1976), made by her brother in-law Yash Chopra, and had a starring role in Chalte Chalte (1976). Another notable role she played was as a vamp in Karz (1980). She starred in the BBC docu-drama Maharajas (1987), based on the book by Charles Allen.

In the early 1980s, her attention turned to writing and direction. She formed her own production company, Siga Arts International. She hosted, produced and directed a TV series for Doordarshan called It's a Woman's World (1983). She also made a documentary for Channel 4 in the UK called Living Legend Raj Kapoor (1984). This was followed by a three-part documentary on Rajiv Gandhi titled India's Rajiv. She wrote and directed a Hindi feature film Rukhsat and produced television commercials.

Garewal anchored the talk show Rendezvous with Simi Garewal.

She usually wears her signature white clothes on TV shows and at award ceremonies, and is popularly known as "The Lady in White". Garewal recently appeared on Say Shava Shava 2008 as a hostess and judge. After the Mumbai terrorist attacks of November 2008, Simi Garewal aroused controversy by publicly calling for the Indian government to "carpet-bomb" the training camps in Pakistan for which she later apologised.

She returned to television with her new talk show India's Most Desirable on Star Plus which would interview only eligible singles, Bollywood actors, business and media icons, and Indian cricketers about their "ideal and desirable beaus".

Simi Garewal has her own website which she uses to interact with her fans. The site has her voice reading the text. She also has her own channel on YouTube where all her shows and documentaries are uploaded. The channel has received over 40 million views.

== Personal life ==
Garewal had her first serious relationship at the age of 17, with the Maharaja of Jamnagar, Shatrusalyasinhji who was also her neighbour in England. Garewal was later in a relationship with Mansoor Ali Khan Pataudi, the Nawab of Pataudi, but he broke up with her after he met Sharmila Tagore. She was then in a relationship with the Pakistani politician Salman Taseer, which began in Dubai, and ended after a year.

In 1970, she married Ravi Mohan, a member of the aristocratic Chunnamal family from Delhi. They divorced in 1979.

== Filmography ==
=== As an actress ===
Year	Film	Role	Notes
1962	Raaz Ki Baat	Kamal	
1962	Son of India	Lalita	
1962	Kaneez		Shelved film
1962	Tarzan Goes to India	Princess Kamara	
1964	Vidyapati		
1965	Teen Devian	Simi / Radha Rani	
1965	Johar-Mehmood in Goa	Simmi	
1966	Do Badan	Dr. Anjali	
1968	Aadmi	Aarti	
1968	Saathi	Rajini	
1968	Ek Raat	Rekha B. Sharma	
1970	Mera Naam Joker	Mary	
1970	Night In Calcutta		
1970	Aranyer Din Ratri	Duli	Bengali film
1971	Andaz	Mona	Special appearance
1971	Do Boond Pani	Gauri	
1971	Seema		
1972	Anokhi Pehchan		
1972	Siddhartha	Kamala	
1973	Padatik	Woman Who Shelters Activist	Bengali film
1973	Namak Haraam	Manisha	
1974	Haath Ki Safai	Roma S. Kumar	
1974	Doosri Sita	Doctor	
1974	Dak Bangla		
1976	Naach Uthe Sansaar	Somu	
1976	Chalte Chalte	Geeta	
1976	Kabhi Kabhie	Shobha Kapoor	
1977	Abhi To Jee Lein	Miss Mahajan	
1978	Udeekan	Naranjan 'Nanjo'	
1979	Shaayad	Defence Counsel	
1979	Ahsaas	Asha Choudhry	
1980	The Burning Train	School Teacher	
1980	Karz	Kamini Verma	
1980	Insaf Ka Tarazu	Bharti Saxena's Lawyer	
1981	Naseeb	Herself	Cameo appearance
1981	Professor Pyarelal	Rita	
1981	Biwi-O-Biwi	Nisha	
1982	Daulat Ka Nasha		
1982	Dard Ka Rishta	Lady Dr. Mukharjee	
1982	Teri Meri Kahani	Meena Sastry / Seema	TV Film
1982	Thikana		Shelved film
1982	Haathkadi	Pammi Mittal	
1986	Love and God	Ghazala	
1987–1988	Kings To Commoners		TV Series
1988	Rukhsat	Radha Talwar	Also director
1989	Izhaar		

=== Television ===
Year	Show name	Role	Notes
1983	It's A Woman's World	Producer/Director	Show about fashion, relationships and astrology
1984– 1986	Living Legend Raj Kapoor	Writer/Director	Documentary on Raj Kapoor for Channel Four Television, UK
1991	India's Rajiv	Writer/Director	Three-part documentary series on Rajiv Gandhi
1997–2005	Rendezvous with Simi Garewal	Hostess	5 seasons (140 episodes), on Star World India
2011	Simi Selects India's Most Desirable	Hostess	1 seasons (22 episodes), on Star World India
