= Item number =

Musical performance in Indian cinema

In Indian cinema, an item number or special song is a musical number inserted into a film that may or may not have any relevance to the plot. The term is commonly used within Indian films (Bengali, Hindi, Kannada, Punjabi, Tamil, and Telugu cinema) to describe a catchy, upbeat, often provocative dance sequence performed in a movie. These sequences predominantly feature glamorous female performers, commonly referred to as item girls, whose appearance, movements, and attire are designed to attract visual attention and heighten the sensual appeal of the film.

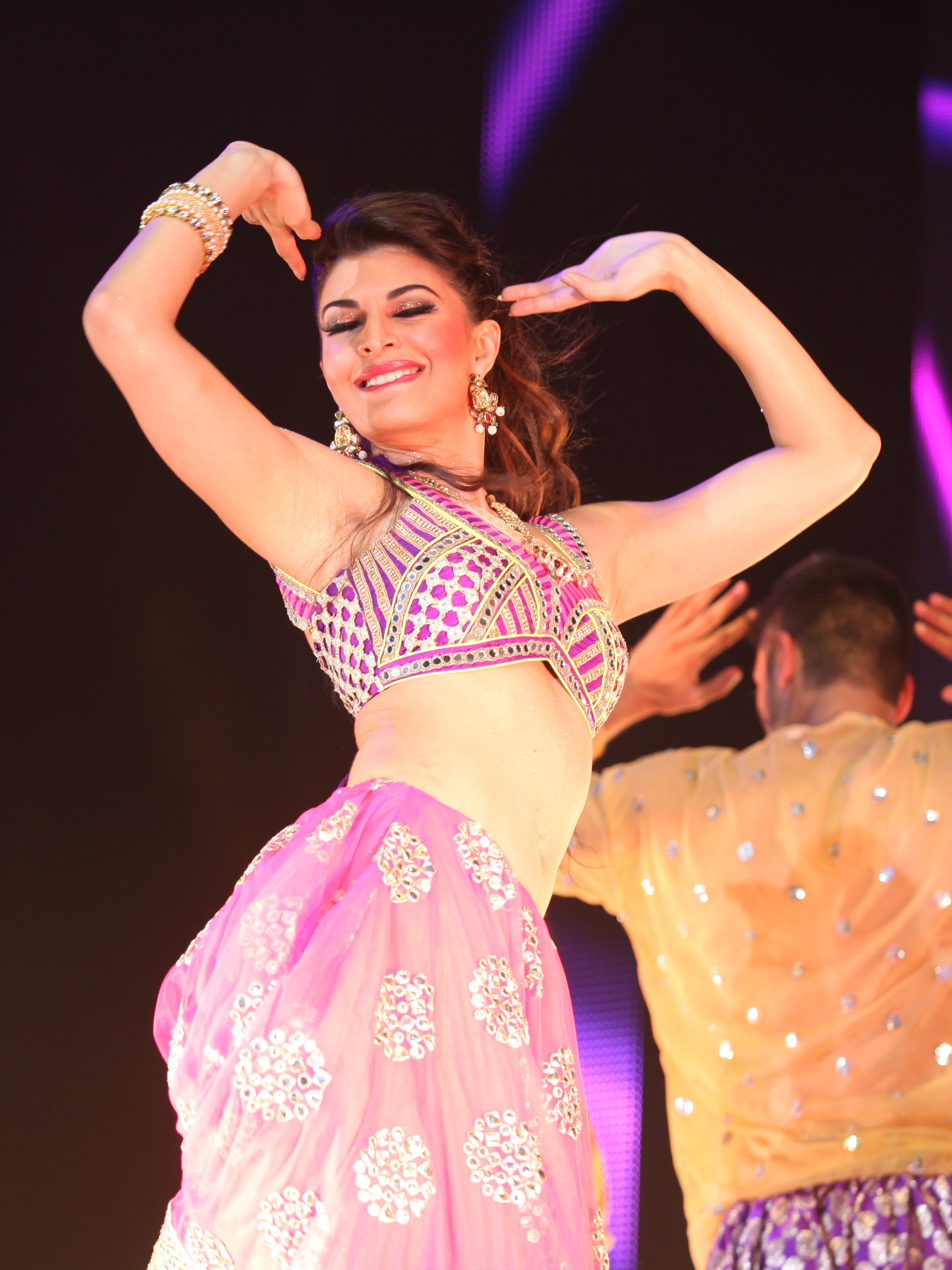
Jacqueline Fernandez, one of the popular performers of item numbers in Indian cinema

Such item numbers are strongly associated with the objectification of women on screen, where the female body becomes the central spectacle rather than the narrative itself. The main aim of an item number is to entertain movie-goers and to lend support to the marketability of the film by being featured in trailers. They are favoured by filmmakers as they afford the opportunity to pick potential hit songs from the stocks, since they do not add to the continuity of the plot. It is thus a vehicle for commercial success that ensures repeat viewing.

A distinctive feature of the item number is its construction around the visual and sensual appeal of its lead performer. An actress, singer, or dancer—especially someone poised to become a star—who appears in an item number is popularly referred to as an item girl. While male performers known as item boys occasionally feature in such sequences, the phenomenon remains overwhelmingly associated with women, who are far more frequently cast in these roles.

In colloquial filmi slang used in Mumbai, the term item itself often implies a "sexy woman", reinforcing the view that the female body is the intended spectacle in these numbers, complemented by racy visuals and suggestive lyrics.

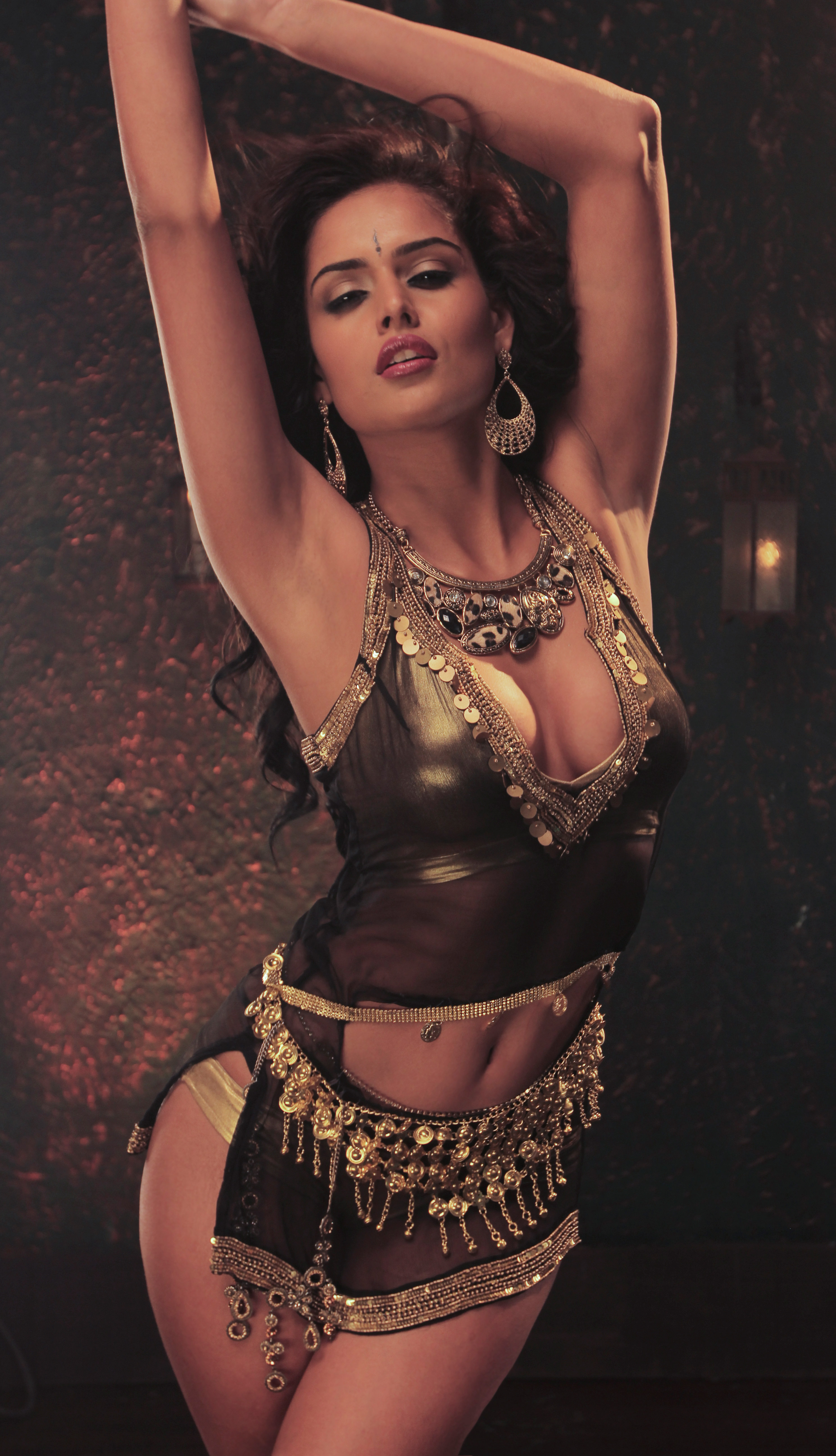
Actress Nathalia Kaur performing an item number in the film Department (2012)

== History ==
=== 1930s–1970s ===
Up to the 1970s, Hindi cinema often relied on a female "vamp" character – usually playing the role of a cabaret dancer, tawaif/prostitute/courtesan, or male gangster's moll – to provide musical entertainment deemed more risqué. While film heroines also sang and danced, it was the vamp who wore more revealing clothes, smoked, drank, and sang sexually suggestive lyrics. The vamp was portrayed as immodest rather than evil, and her dance performances were sexualized by male producers. The trend was started by Cuckoo in films like Awaara (1951), Aan (1952) and Shabistan (1951).

Item numbers had been featured in Bollywood from as early as the 1930s. Azoorie in the 1930s often performed item numbers; Cuckoo was the next popular item dancer in the late 40s. Her banner year was 1949 when she was featured in over 17 films performing dances. Actress and classical dancer Vyjayanthimala introduced the classical dance number to Hindi films with her debut film Bahar (1951). She also popularized a mixture of classical and contemporary in films such as Devdas (1955), Amrapali (1966), Madhumati (1958), Sadhna (1958), Sunghursh (1968) etc.

In the early 50s, Cuckoo introduced the Anglo-Burmese Helen as a chorus girl. In time Helen would come to be the most popular vamp of the late-50s, 60s and 70s, having had performed in scores of item numbers including such popular songs as "Mera Naam Chin Chin Choo" from the film Howrah Bridge (1958), "Piya Tu Ab To Aaja" from Caravan (1971), "Mehbooba Mehbooba" from Sholay (1975), "Yeh Mera Dil" from Don (1978) (the song's tune was used in Don't Phunk with My Heart), "O Haseena Zulfon Wali" from Teesri Manzil and "Aa Jaane Jaan" from Intaqam. In films like Gunga Jumna and Zindagi the actress performed semi-classical Indian dances in songs like "Tora man bada paapi" and "Ghungarwa mora chham chham baaje". A desi bar number, "Mungda" from Inkaar, was also immensely popular. In addition to her skillful dancing, her anglicised looks too helped further the vamp image. Helen's dominance pushed other vying item number dancers like Madhumati, Bela Bose, Laxmi Chhaya, Jeevankala, Aruna Irani, Sheela R. and Sujata Bakshi into the background and less prestigious and low budget B-movies.

In the early part of the 1970s, actresses Jayshree T., Bindu, Aruna Irani and Padma Khanna entered into what was Helen's monopoly. Another noted feature of this era was the "tribal and banjara" item numbers such as the one in Shalimar. Such songs provided the necessary settings for the lead couple's love to bloom.

=== 1980s–1990s ===
Silk Smitha was part of several successful item dance numbers in 1980s Indian films. Around the 1980s the vamp and the heroine merged into one figure and the lead actress had begun to perform the bolder numbers. The craze for "tribal and banjara" item numbers soon gave way to slick choreography. In the late 1990s, with the proliferation of films based on television shows, film producers had come to realise that an exceptional way to entice audiences into theaters was by spending excessively on the visualization of songs. Regardless of the theme and plot, an elaborate song and dance routine involving spectacularly lavish sets, costumes, special effects, extras and dancers would invariably be featured in a film. It was asserted that this contributed highly to the film's "repeat value".

Madhuri Dixit is often considered to be the pioneer of the modern trend. In the late 1980s, the song "Ek Do Teen" was added to the movie Tezaab as an afterthought, but it transformed Dixit and made her a superstar. Her partnership with choreographer Saroj Khan resulted in numerous hits including the controversial "Choli Ke Peeche Kya hai" and "Dhak Dhak Karne Laga" (Beta). Soon after the release of the film Khal Nayak, there were press reports stating that people were seeing the film again and again but only for the song "Choli Ke Peeche Kya Hai" that featured Dixit. Actress Sridevi performed her most famous number in the song "Kate Nahin Kat Te" from the film Mr. India.

Although there have been many songs that fit the descriptions of item numbers in the early and mid-1990s, the term itself was coined when Shilpa Shetty danced for "Main Aai Hoon UP Bihar Lootne" in the movie Shool. This is perhaps the first time the media actually referred to Shetty as an "item girl" and the scene as an "item number". In 1998 Urmila Matondkar featured in the song "Chamma Chamma" in the 1998 film China Gate.

=== 2000s ===
Abhishek Bachchan became the first "item boy" with his performance in Rakht. Shah Rukh Khan performed an item number of sorts during the opening credits of Kaal but later had an item number in a truer sense of the word with "Dard-e-disco" in Om Shanti Om, where he was shot in a more typical "item girl" manner, with Khan wearing minimal clothing (though this number did have a connection, albeit tenuous, with the plot of the film). In Krazzy 4, Hrithik Roshan has an item number during the end credits. Ranbir Kapoor made his debut in an item number in Chillar Party (2011), drawing inspiration from his father Rishi Kapoor's Qawwali song "Parda Hai Parda" from Amar Akbar Anthony. In 2005 and 2006 actress Bipasha Basu gave blockbuster hit numbers like "No Entry" and "Beedi Jalaile".

After Bachchan, the "item boy" trend was reused by Dev in Bengali cinema, who did a cameo with the song "Pante Taali" in the film Chirodini...Tumi Je Amar (2008). He also established his image of a "dancing star" with popular dance numbers including "Bhojo Gourango" in Challenge (2009), "Le Paglu Dance" in Bolo Na Tumi Aamar (2009), "Pyarelal" in Dui Prithibi (2010), "Khokababu Jay" in Shedin Dekha Hoyechilo (2010), "Lady Killer Romeo" in Romeo (2011), "Dance Maare Khokababu" in Khokababu (2012), "Party Shoes" in Bindaas (2014), "Desi Chhori" in Yoddha (2014) and "Dhitang Dhitang" in Love Express (2016).

In 2005, Aishwarya Rai Bachchan was featured in "Kajra Re" from the movie, Bunty Aur Babli. In 2006, Mumaith Khan was featured in "Ippatikinka" from the Telugu film Pokiri, sung by Suchitra, and again the following year in 2007 with the Tamil remake Pokkiri in the song "En Chella Peru Apple". In the 2007 Telugu film Desamuduru, the song "Attaantode Ittaantode" featuring Allu Arjun and Rambha became a chartbuster. In the 2007 film Om Shanti Om, the song "Deewangi Deewangi" had guest appearances by over 30 Bollywood stars. In 2008, the makers of Rab Ne Bana Di Jodi featured Kajol, Bipasha Basu, Lara Dutta, Priety Zinta, and Rani Mukerji playing five leading ladies opposite Shahrukh Khan in the song "Phir Milenge Chalte Chalte". In 2007, Mallika Sherawat performed the item number "Mehbooba O Mehbooba" in Aap Ka Suroor - The Real Love Story.

=== 2010s ===
In 2010, Katrina Kaif featured in "Sheila Ki Jawani" from Tees Maar Khan, and Malaika Arora featured in "Munni Badnaam Hui" from Dabangg. Parallels were drawn between Katrina and Malaika, as well as between the item numbers, in what was popularly known as the "Munni vs Sheila" debate. The songs became so popular, that, soon, more films began incorporating item numbers, and with more top stars now wanting to do them.

In 2012, Katrina Kaif again featured in the item number "Chikni Chameli" in Agneepath, sung by Shreya Ghoshal which became a huge hit, while Kareena Kapoor was featured in "Fevicol Se" in Dabangg 2, sung by the same artist from "Munni Badnam Hui". In 2013, Deepika Padukone had some success in item dancing, performing songs like "Party On My Mind" and "Lovely". Priyanka Chopra performed in many item numbers, such as " Babli Badmaash", "Pinky", and an appearance in Sanjay Leela Bhansali's Goliyon Ki Raasleela Ram-Leela song "Ram Chahe Leela", of which became a blockbuster upon release. Mahi Gill, Sonakshi Sinha, and Jacqueline Fernandez made their debut with "Don't Touch My Body", "Govinda Govinda" and "Jadu Ki Jappi" respectively.

Indian-Canadian actress Sunny Leone performed her first item dance with "Laila" from the 2013 film "Shootout at Wadala", followed up with Baby Doll from Ragini MMS 2. In 2017, Sunny Leone featured in the hit item number "Laila Main Laila" starring Shah Rukh Khan in the film Raees. It is a recreation of the song "Laila O Laila" from the 1980 film Qurbani, which featured actress Zeenat Aman with Feroz Khan in the original musical number. In 2017, Anglo-Indian actress Amanda Rosario featured in the item number "Sarkar" sung by Rani Hazarika from the movie Udanchhoo.

In 2018, Pooja Hegde featured in the hit item number "Jigelu Rani" from the film Rangasthalam. The song was trending on YouTube. Jacqueline Fernandez featured in the remake of the "Ek Do Teen" song that originally featured Madhuri Dixit. Moroccan-Canadian dancer-actress Nora Fatehi also featured in the item song "Dilbar" which has become one of the most popular Bollywood music videos of all time. It is a recreation of the item number of the same name from Sirf Tum (1999), which was composed by Nadeem–Shravan and featured Sushmita Sen as an item girl. The re-created version by Tanishk Bagchi features Middle-Eastern musical sounds. In the music video, Nora Fatehi performs belly dancing, an Arabic dance style that was previously featured in a number of popular Bollywood item numbers, performed by actresses such as Helen in "Mehbooba O Mehbooba" from Sholay (1975), Zeenat Aman in "Raqqasa Mera Naam" from The Great Gambler (1979), Mallika Sherawat in "Mayya Mayya" from Guru (2007), and Rani Mukerji in "Aga Bai" from Aiyyaa (2012). The international success of "Dilbar" inspired an Arabic-language version, also featuring Nora Fatehi. "Dilbar" is popular across Southern Asia and the Arab world, with all versions of the song having received more than 1 billion views on YouTube. From then on, Nora Fatehi became associated with performing item numbers that featured belly dancing. TV and Bollywood actress Mouni Roy made her debut by "Nachna Aunda Nahi". The "Gali Gali" track from the Kannada film K.G.F: Chapter 1, sung by Neha Kakkar, which featured Mouni Roy also, was a huge hit. Alia Bhatt also made an appearance in "The Hookup Song" from Student of The Year 2 (2019).

=== 2020s ===
In the 2020s, item songs moved away from the suggestiveness and risque visuals to a more musical and dance-filled approach, while still wearing similar belly-dance clothes. In 2021, the popular "Oo Antava Oo Oo Antava" track sung by Indravathi Chauhan from the Telugu language film Pushpa: The Rise featuring Samantha was released. Nushrratt Bharuccha too featured in an item number song from the film Chhalaang. In 2021, Janhvi Kapoor performed her first item number in the song "Nadiyon Paar" from the film Roohi. Pooja Hegde delivered an Arabic belly dance in the blockbuster song "Arabic Kuthu" from Beast. In 2023, Sayyeshaa featured in an item number "Raawadi" from the Tamil film Pathu Thala. Tamannaah featured in item songs like "Kaavaalaa" from Jailer alongside Rajinikanth and "Aaj Ki Raat" from Stree 2. In 2024, Actress Sharvari performed her first item number in the song "Taras" from Munjya. She has also performed many item number songs in Telugu cinema, with her most famous being Kissik from Pushpa 2: The Rule.

== Criticism ==
The dancer Nora Fatehi has criticized the term “item girl”, saying “Item girl, I don’t know who created that word. It doesn’t even phonetically make sense. Like Item is a thing. You know like ‘This is an item’. And then girl, this doesn’t make sense. To me, I don’t understand it.” She argues that her performance oriented songs include complex choreography with a purpose other than titillation. Many other actresses and dancers have also shared criticism of calling their songs “item songs”, such as Katrina Kaif who said, “I don’t view my songs as item numbers.” Malaika Arora Khan has voiced similar sentiments, saying "I don't like the term 'item girl'... Why not look at it [item songs] as a special song? A song that is creating a hype and entertainment. I find it derogatory and silly.”

Writing for The Tempest, Anum Waseem said, "On paper, item numbers form the perfect formula for female sexual empowerment. In reality, they mostly result in the most blatant objectification. Camera angles zoom in over gyrating hips and linger over bare waists as blatantly as the eyes of the ogling men with no subtlety. The gaze in these dance numbers presents itself as vaguely voyeuristic, at best. There is a very deliberate implication present; that the item girl is not only inviting the leers and jeers, but she is also enjoying them."

== Legal status ==
On 21 July 2005, the Indian parliament passed a bill to ban dance bars in Maharashtra. Criticizing the bill and supporting the dancers, Flavia Agnes said that bar dancing cannot be termed as vulgar, as bar dancers are simply imitating what item girls do in films and work in dance bars out of their own choice.

In 2013, the Central Board of Film Certification issued a resolution declaring that item songs would be rated as adult content and would not be allowed to be shown on television channels.

== Outside India ==
The Pakistani film industry, called Lollywood, has recently adopted the concept of adding item songs to boost the success of commercial films. In 2014 Mehwish Hayat debuted on the big screen in the item number "Billi" in the film Na Maloom Afraad. She also performed another item number, "Gangster Guriya", in the movie Baaji. Actress Urwa Hocane appeared in the song "Pretty face" in the film Tich Button. In 2015, Ayesha Omar performed in the song "Trutti frutti" for the film Karachi Se Lahore. In the film Na Maloom Afraad, the item number "Kaif o Suroor" was performed by Sadaf Kanwal.
