= Simi Selects India's Most Desirable =

Indian celebrity talk show

Simi Selects India's Most Desirable is a talk show aired on STAR World India, hosted by Indian film actress and TV host Simi Garewal. It airs on STAR World on Sundays at 9pm. The premise of the show is a celebrity chat hosted by Simi Garewal. The interviews revolve around the romantic preferences of Indian celebrities from different fields, and include interviews with their parents. The show is filmed in front of a live studio audience and involves chat show as well as game elements such as dancing, singing, playing musical instruments, and baking. This show is based on the idea to bring young single celebrities from India to come up and talk about their personal and professional life. The show's first celebrity was Ranbir Kapoor, in the episode aired on 12 June 2011.

== List of episodes ==
Episode #	Date	Guests
Episode 1	12 June 2011	Ranbir Kapoor
Episode 2	19 June 2011	Deepika Padukone
Episode 3	26 June 2011	Siddharth Mallya
Episode 4	3 July 2011	Sonakshi Sinha
Episode 5	10 July 2011	John Abraham
Episode 6	17 July 2011	Sonam Kapoor
Episode 7	24 July 2011	Abhay Deol
Episode 8	31 July 2011	Anushka Sharma
Episode 9	7 August 2011	Ranveer Singh
Episode 10	14 August 2011	Freida Pinto
Episode 11	21 August 2011	Lady Gaga
Episode 12	28 August 2011	Yuvraj Singh
Episode 13	4 September 2011	Shahid Kapoor
Episode 14	11 September 2011	Karan Johar
Episode 15	18 September 2011	Siddharth Mallya (repeat telecast)
Episode 16	25 September 2011	Kangana Ranaut
Episode 17	2 October 2011	Neil Nitin Mukesh
Episode 18	9 October 2011	Asin
Episode 19	16 October 2011	Rani Mukherjee
Episode 20	23 October 2011	(repeat telecast)
Episode 21	30 October 2011	Priyanka Chopra
Episode 22	6 November 2011	John Abraham (repeat telecast)
