= Andaz (1971 film) =

1971 film

- Directed by: Ramesh Sippy
- Written by: Salim–Javed; Gulzar
- Screenplay by: Salim-Javed; Sachin Bhowmick
- Story by: Salim-Javed; Sachin Bhowmick
- Produced by: G. P. Sippy
- Starring: Shammi Kapoor; Hema Malini; Rajesh Khanna; Simi Garewal
- Cinematography: K Vaikunth
- Edited by: M. S. Shinde
- Music by: Shankar–Jaikishan
- Distributed by: Sippy Films
- Release date: 30 April 1971
- Running time: 166 minutes
- Country: India
- Language: Hindi

Andaz (transl. Style) is a 1971 Indian Bollywood romantic drama film, directed by Ramesh Sippy in his directorial debut, and written by Salim–Javed, Gulzar and Sachin Bhowmick. It stars Shammi Kapoor and Hema Malini in lead roles with Rajesh Khanna and Simi Garewal making special appearances.

== Plot ==
Ravi (Shammi Kapoor) is a single father bringing up his only daughter, Munni along with his mother. His college-going brother Badal (Roopesh Kumar) is shown to be a playboy and spendthrift. At a fund raiser for the local school, Ravi meets Sheetal (Hema Malini) and takes a liking for her. He drops her home and realises she is a single mother, raising her only son, Deepu. It also turns out that Sheetal is Munni's teacher. A sub plot involves worker Gangu (Randhawa), who cannot speak, and his love for Mahua (Aruna Irani). Mahua is shown to be flirting with Ravi. As Ravi with Sheetal get to know each other, their past stories are revealed as a flashback.

Sheetal has been left devastated by the death of her beloved Raj (Rajesh Khanna). They were engaged in a romantic relationship but not legally married. When Raj tells his father about his plans to marry Sheetal, his father refuses to accept Sheetal as her lineage is unknown. Raj disowns his father and his property and walks out. On his way to Sheetal's birthday party, he meets with a fatal accident. Humiliated by Raj's father, a pregnant Sheetal attempts suicide but rescued is by a priest. She has moved to the current city and raising Deepu as a single mother.

Ravi reveals that his wife Mona (Simi Garewal) died soon after giving birth to Munni. She had a health condition which proved fatal after childbirth.

When Badal finds out that Ravi has stopped his money supply, he comes back home with a friend. While he eyes Mahua in a not-so-decent manner, his friend spots Sheetal, and spins a story about her being a money-grabber.

A series of cute incidents with Munni and Deepu draw their parents closer. Ravi confesses his love for Sheetal. The priest convinces Sheetal to accept Ravi's proposal.

Badal and his friend chase Mahua in the forest. As she is trying to escape, she spots Ravi in the distance in his Jeep, and cries out for help but Ravi believes she is crying wolf as she always does, and drives on.

Ravi takes Sheetal home to meet his mother, who blames Sheetal based on the concocted story she has heard from Badal's friend. Sheetal is shattered. Ravi confronts his mother, and a twist is revealed, that Ravi is also illegitimate.

Mahua who has been molested has committed suicide. The mute Gangu and villagers blame Ravi. Ravi goes after Badal and his friend who finally confess.

Sheetal finds Raj's repentant father waiting for her at home. He wants to take her and Deepu to Bombay. Ravi and family drive to the railway station. Sheetal finally accepts Ravi's proposal for a happy ending.

== Cast ==
- Shammi Kapoor as Ravi
- Hema Malini as Sheetal
- Rajesh Khanna as Raj (Special appearance)
- Simi Garewal as Mona (Special appearance)
- Master Alankar as Deepu
- Baby Gauree as Munni
- Ajit as Raj's Father
- Roopesh Kumar as Badal
- Aruna Irani as Mahua
- Achala Sachdev as Ravi's mother
- Abhi Bhattacharya
- Randhawa
- David

== Soundtrack ==
The songs for the film were written by Hasrat Jaipuri. Vocals for Khanna and Kapoor are supplied by their frequent collaborators, Kishore Kumar and Mohammed Rafi, respectively, while Asha Bhosle sang for Hema Malini.

#	Title	Singer(s)
1	"Zindagi Ek Safar Hai Suhana"	Kishore Kumar
2	"Zindagi Ek Safar Hai Suhana (II)"	Mohammed Rafi
3	"Zindagi Ek Safar Hai Suhana (III)"	Asha Bhosle
4	"Re Mama Re Mama Re"	Mohammed Rafi
5	"Dil Use Do Jo Jaan De De"	Mohammed Rafi, Asha Bhosle
6	"Hai Na Bolo Bolo"	Mohammed Rafi, Suman Kalyanpur, Sushma Shrestha, Pratibha
7	"Mujhe Pyas Aesi Pyas Lagi Hai"	Asha Bhosle

== Reception ==
The film was a big hit and an important milestone in the career of Hema Malini as an actress.

It features Zindagi Ek Safar Hai Suhana, one of the best-known Bollywood yodels by the singer Kishore Kumar that was also featured on the soundtrack of Mira Nair's Mississippi Masala. The song fetched Kumar a nomination for the Filmfare Award for Best Male Playback Singer. Shammi Kapoor's stardom was on the decline at the time and Rajesh Khanna's special appearance turned out to be a major contributor to the success of the film.

Andaz was the last hit for Shammi Kapoor as a lead. Shammi Kapoor's performance was well received and it is considered be one of the most uncharacteristic roles in his acting career.

Rajesh Khanna's special appearance turned out to be a major contributor to the success of the film. It is counted among the 17 consecutive hit films of Rajesh Khanna between 1969 and 1971, adding the two-hero films Maryada and Andaz to the 15 consecutive solo hits he gave in that period.

The film is also noted for Ajit's rare turn as a sympathetic character.

== Awards ==
19th Filmfare Awards:

Won

- Best Lyricist – Hasrat Jaipuri for "Zindagi Ek Safar Hai Suhana"

Nominated

- Best Music Director – Shankar–Jaikishan
- Best Male Playback Singer – Kishore Kumar for "Zindagi Ek Safar Hai Suhana"
- Best Female Playback Singer – Asha Bhosle for "Zindagi Ek Safar Hai Suhana"
