= 19th Filmfare Awards =

1972 awards for Hindi cinema

- Date: 24 March 1972
- Site: Bombay

Highlights
- Best Film: Anand
- Best Actor: Rajesh Khanna for Anand
- Best Actress: Asha Parekh for Kati Patang
- Most awards: Anand (6)
- Most nominations: Anand (7)

The 19th Filmfare Awards were held in 1972, honoring the best Hindi films released in the year 1971.

Anand and Mera Naam Joker led the ceremony with 7 nominations, followed by Kati Patang with 6 nominations.

Anand won 6 awards, including Best Film, Best Actor (for Rajesh Khanna) and Best Supporting Actor (for Amitabh Bachchan), thus becoming the most-awarded film at the ceremony.

Rajesh Khanna received dual nominations for Best Actor for his performances in Anand and Kati Patang, winning for the former.

Jaya Bachchan received dual nominations for Best Actress for her performances in Guddi and Uphaar, but lost to Asha Parekh who won the award for Kati Patang, her first and only win in the category.

== Main awards ==
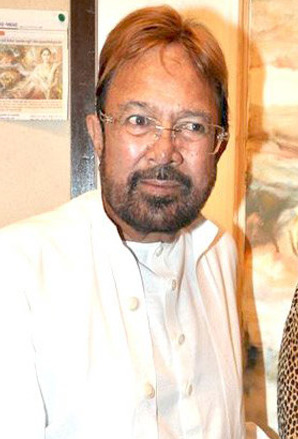
Rajesh Khanna — Best Actor winner for Anand

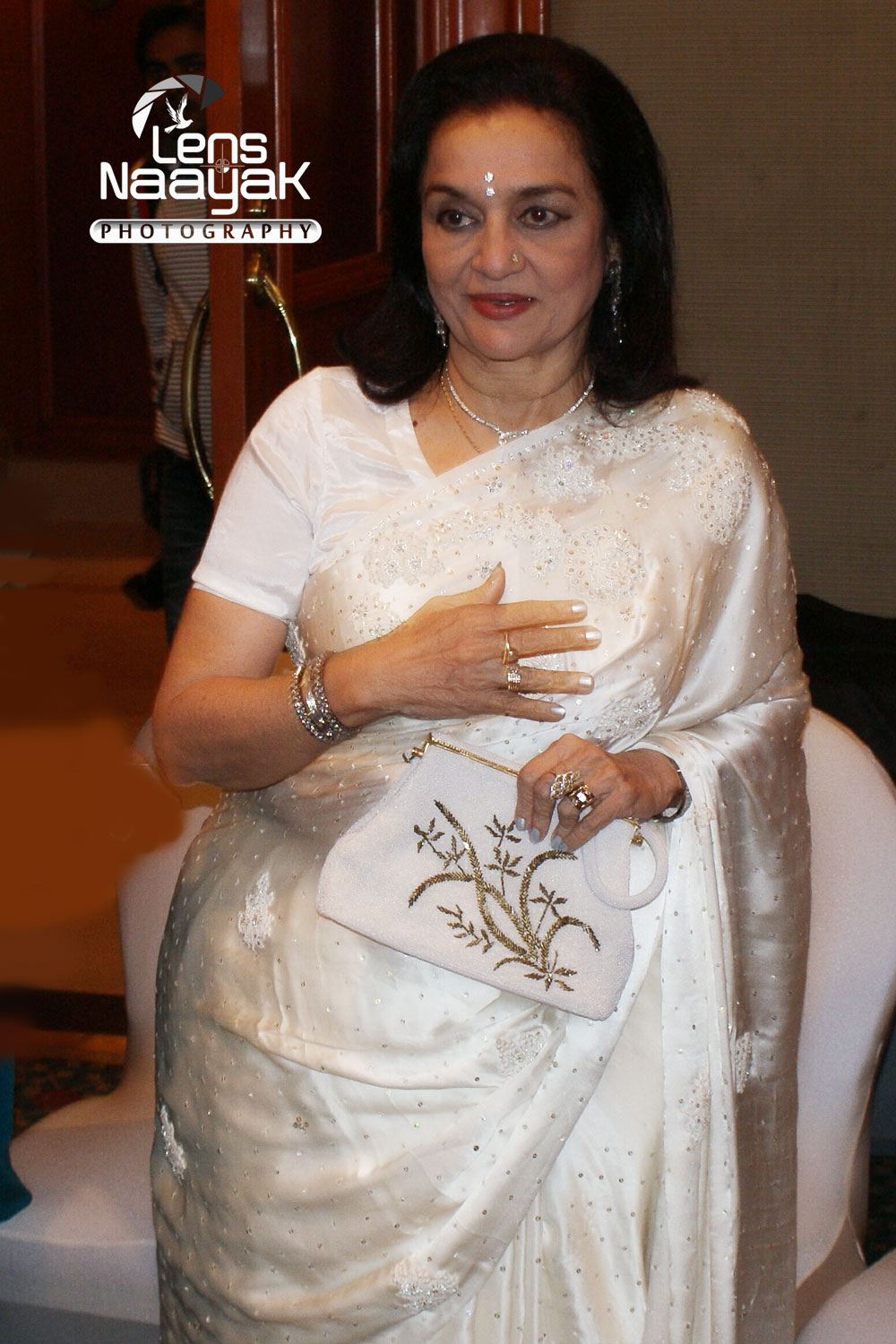
Asha Parekh — Best Actress winner for Kati Patang

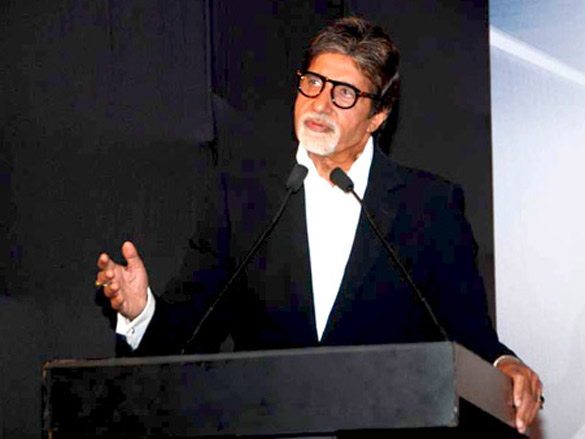
Amitabh Bachchan — Best Supporting Actor winner for Anand

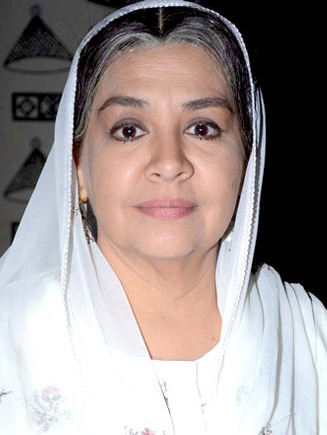
Farida Jalal — Best Supporting Actress winner for Paras

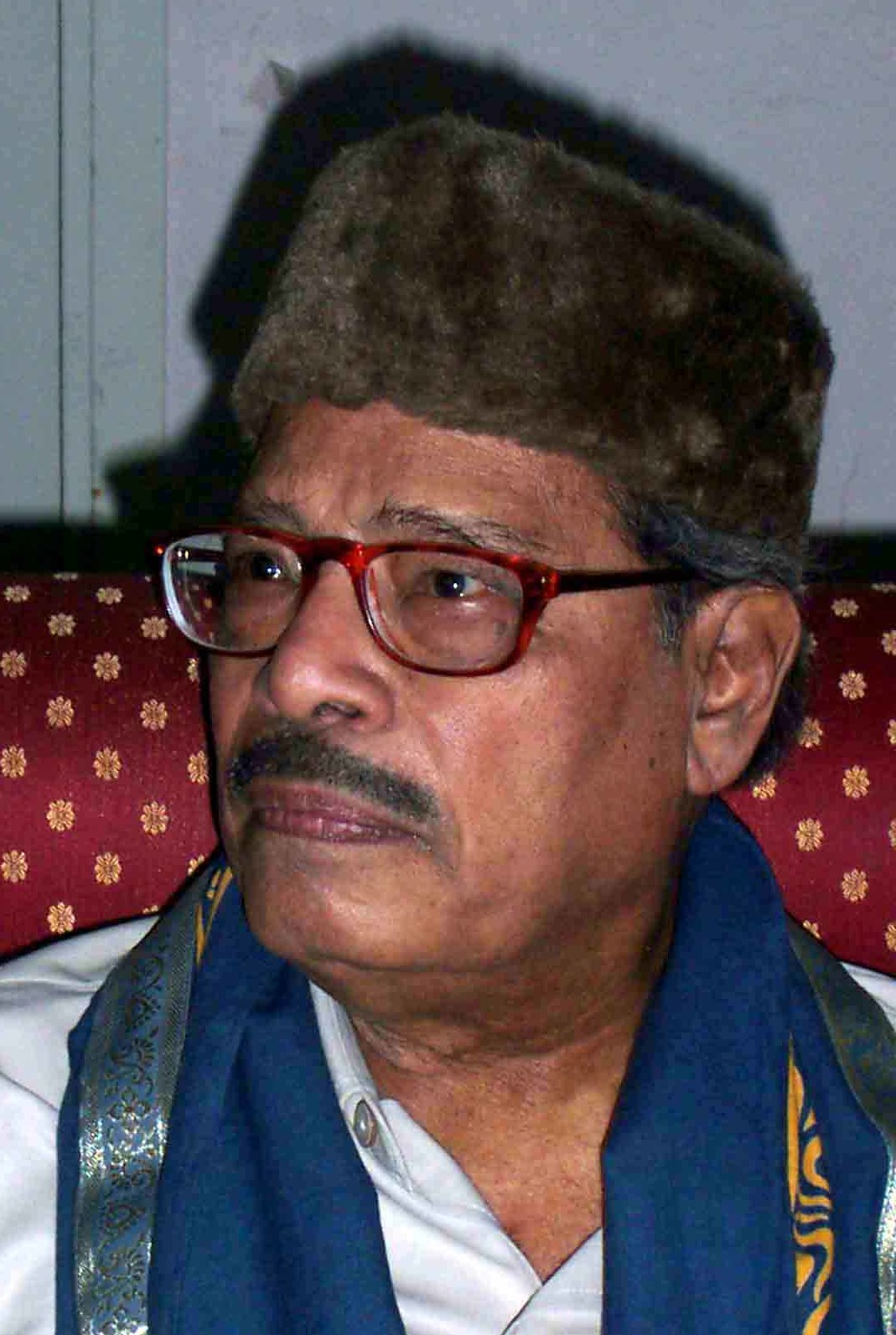
Manna Dey — Best Playback singer, Male winner for "Ey Bhai Zara Dekh Ke Chalo" (Mera Naam Joker)

=== Best Film ===
Anand

- Mera Naam Joker
- Naya Zamana

=== Best Director ===
Raj Kapoor – Mera Naam Joker

- Hrishikesh Mukherjee – Anand
- Shakti Samanta – Kati Patang

=== Best Actor ===
Rajesh Khanna – Anand

- Dharmendra – Mera Gaon Mera Desh
- Rajesh Khanna – Kati Patang

=== Best Actress ===
Asha Parekh – Kati Patang

- Jaya Bachchan – Guddi
- Jaya Bachchan – Uphaar

=== Best Supporting Actor ===
Amitabh Bachchan – Anand

- Pran – Adhikar
- Shatrughan Sinha – Paras

=== Best Supporting Actress ===
Farida Jalal – Paras

- Aruna Irani – Caravan
- Helen – Elaan

=== Best Comic Actor ===
Mehmood – Paras

- Jagdeep – Ek Nari Ek Brahmachari
- Mehmood – Main Sunder Hoon

=== Best Story ===
Anand – Hrishikesh Mukherjee

- Kati Patang – Gulshan Nanda
- Naya Zamana – Gulshan Nanda

=== Best Screenplay ===
Sara Aakash – Basu Chatterjee

=== Best Dialogue ===
Anand – Gulzar

=== Best Music Director ===
Mera Naam Joker – Shankar-Jaikishan

- Andaz – Shankar-Jaikishan
- Caravan – R.D. Burman

=== Best Lyricist ===
Andaz – Hasrat Jaipuri for Zindagi Ek Safar Hai Suhana

- Kati Patang – Anand Bakshi for Na Koi Umang Hai
- Mera Naam Joker – Gopaldas Neeraj for Ey Bhai Zara Dekh Ke Chalo

=== Best Playback Singer, Male ===
Mera Naam Joker – Manna Dey for Ey Bhai Zara Dekh Ke Chalo

- Andaz – Kishore Kumar for Zindagi Ek Safar
- Kati Patang – Kishore Kumar for Yeh Jo Mohabbat Hai

=== Best Playback Singer, Female ===
Caravan – Asha Bhosle for Piya Tu Ab to Aa Ja

- Andaz – Asha Bhosle for Zindagi Ek Safar
- Ek Nari Ek Brahmachari – Sharda for Aap Ke Peeche

=== Best Art Direction ===
Seema

=== Best B&W Cinematography ===
Dastak

=== Best Color Cinematography ===
Mera Naam Joker

=== Best Editing ===
Anand

=== Best Sound ===
Mera Naam Joker

=== Special Award ===
- Jaya Bachchan for Uphaar
- Prithviraj Kapoor – Special Commendation

== Critics' awards ==
=== Best Film ===
Ashadh Ka Ek Din

=== Best Documentary ===
Creations in Metal

== Biggest winners ==
- Anand – 6/7
- Mera Naam Joker – 5/7
- Paras – 2/3
- Kati Patang – 1/6

== See also ==
- 21st Filmfare Awards
- 20th Filmfare Awards
