= Rungoli =

- Directed by: Amar Kumar
- Written by: Rajinder Singh Bedi
- Produced by: Rajinder Singh Bedi; Amar Kumar
- Starring: Kishore Kumar; Vyjayanthimala; Durga Khote
- Cinematography: K Vaikunth
- Edited by: G.G. Mayekar
- Music by: Shankar Jaikishan
- Distributed by: R. S. B. Films
- Release date: 1962
- Running time: 176 minutes
- Country: India
- Language: Hindi

Rungoli (Hindi: रंगोली; Urdu: رنگولی; translation: A Colourful Pattern of Life, also transliterated as Rangoli) is a 1962 Black-and-white Romance comedy Hindi film directed by Amar Kumar. The film had Kishore Kumar and Vyjayanthimala in the lead with Durga Khote, Jeevan, Iftekhar and others appearing in supporting roles.

The film had music by the Shankar Jaikishan duo with Hasrat Jaipuri and Shailendra providing the lyrics.

== Plot ==
Sewakram lives a middle-class lifestyle in Bombay(now Mumbai) (India) along with his wife Subhagi, daughter Nirmala(Vyjayanthimala) and son Lattoo. He works in the Flora Fountain branch of the United Commercial Bank. He is very organized and thrifty and plans to get his children educated, married, and also build a house for them. He has entrusted the responsibility of supervising the construction of the house, which he fondly calls his 'Hindustan', to his elder brother, Sadhuram in good faith. Kishore Kumar Shastri(Kishore Kumar) lives a wealthy lifestyle along with his widower dad, a retired Deputy Collector, and runs two businesses for the supply of sand and cement. Once he bumps into Nirmala and becomes besotted with her beauty and charm. He manages to impress everyone in Nirmala's family including her paternal uncle Sadhuram. Realizing the closeness of his daughter to Kishore, who was a suitable match for his daughter, Sewakram meets Kishore's father with the proposal of their marriage. Kishore's father agrees to the proposal on the condition that Sewakram shall pay him Rs. 20,000 as reimbursement of expenses made by him towards his son's education and upbringing. Sewakram agrees to the condition. Meanwhile, oblivious to Sewakram, Sadhuram, in cahoots with the building contractor, Balbhadradas (Dhumal), uses less cement with sand to prepare a spurious mortar mixture in the construction of the house. A large part of the cement meant for the building is either sold or hoarded by the contractor. On completion of the house, while celebrating, Sewakram is gravely injured when an entire floor along with him collapses and he is hospitalized. Kishore tells Nirmala that the accident is entirely due to the misdeeds of her uncle. It is overheard by Sadhuram and in order to get rid of Kishore, he convinces Nirmala that the accident was due to the spurious cement supplied by Kishore. On hearing this Nirmala is heartbroken and refuses to have to do anything with him. Kishore attempts to woo her back, but fails. He promises to Nirmala that he will fight alone to expose the real perpetrators. But, is arrested by the police and held in a cell.

The building construction comes to a standstill as the money runs out. Nirmala gets to know that her father has saved Rs.15,000 towards her marriage expenses. On the insistence of Sadhuram, she persuades her father on the hospital bed to give the amount for resuming construction. Nirmala overhears Sadhuram and Balbhadradas and sees them celebrating the arrest of Kishore and realizes her mistake. Sadhuram forcibly confines her in a room when she declares that she will get Kishore freed on bail. In the meanwhile, Kishore's father realizes his mistake and gets him released on bail. The construction again stops for want of funds. Consequently, Sadhuram sheds crocodile tears before Sewakram's wife that he would rather die than see his younger brother's dream remain unfulfilled. Believing her brother-in-law blindly, she gives all her ornaments to him to complete the construction. Sadhuram sells the ornaments for Rs. 10,000, which is the expected price but tells his sister-in-law that the ornaments only fetched a thousand rupees. Sadhuram promises Nirmala's hand in marriage with a rich trader in exchange for Rs. 5,000, which Nirmala happens to hear. Sadhuram fixes a date to bring his younger brother home from the hospital and also asks the trader to come on the same date to finalize the proposal for marriage. Nirmala arranges an impromptu dance programme to earn some money for the finishing of the building construction in which Kishore also participates. On the appointed day, Kishore gets the go down of the contractor hoarding black-marketed cement, is raided by the police, and consequently gets him arrested. Sadhuram couldn't find Sewakram in the hospital and he is taken by surprise by the arrival of Sewakram at home. By this time Sewakram is aware of the misdeeds of his elder brother. So, as the police arrives along with a handcuffed Balbhadradas to arrest Sadhuram, Sewakram declines to save him. Kishore's father arrives to apologize and finally, the lovebirds are united in holy matrimony.

== Cast ==
- Kishore Kumar as Kishore Kumar Shastri
- Vyjayanthimala as Nirmala "Nimmo"
- Durga Khote as Subhagi
- Jeevan as Sadhuram
- Nazir Hussain as Sewakram
- Brahm Bhardwaj as Doctor
- Dhumal as Balabadradas
- Iftekhar as Police Inspector
- Krishan Kumar as Lattoo
- Sadhana Roychoudhury as Rani
- Jagdev as Mohabbat Rai
- Ulhas as Deputy Shastri
- Vrinda as Balabadradas' wife
- Fazlu

== Songs ==
1. "Chhoti Si Ye Duniya, Pahachaane Raasate Hain" - Kishore Kumar
2. "Choti Si Ye Duniya Pehchane Raaste Hai" - Lata Mangeshkar
3. "Hum Tum Ye Khoyi Khoyi Rahe, Chanchal Isharon Se" - Lata Mangeshkar, Mukesh
4. "Ek Nazar Kisi Ne Dekha Aur Dil Hua Deewana" - Kishore Kumar, Lata Mangeshkar
5. "Jaao-jaao Nand Ke Lala Tum Jhoote" - Lata Mangeshkar
6. "Rangoli Sajaao Re, Teri Paayal Mere Geet" - Kishore Kumar
7. "Sagar Pe Aaj Maujon Ka Raaj, Bechain Hai Nazaara" - Lata Mangeshkar
8. "Hum Bechare Pyar Ke Maare, Aur Tum To Tum Ho" - Kishore Kumar
9. "Chaau Chaau Bombiyana, Ishq Hai Maraz Purana" - Manna Dey

The song "Jaao-jaao Nand Ke Lala Tum Jhoote" is set in raga Bageshri.
