= Mere Hamdam Mere Dost =

- Theatrical release poster
- Directed by: Amar Kumar
- Screenplay by: Amar Kumar
- Dialogues by: Rajinder Singh Bedi
- Story by: Nirmal Kumari
- Produced by: Kewal Kumar
- Starring: Dharmendra; Sharmila Tagore; Mumtaz; Rehman; Om Prakash
- Cinematography: K. Vaikunth
- Edited by: Hrishikesh Mukherjee
- Music by: Laxmikant–Pyarelal
- Production company: Kewaljit Productions
- Release date: 1968
- Country: India
- Language: Hindi
- Box office: ₹1,50,00,000

Mere Hamdam Mere Dost (lit. 'My Beloved, My Friend') is a 1968 Indian Hindi-language romantic drama film directed by Amar Kumar, written by Nirmal Kumari, and produced by Kewal Kumar under the production banner Kawaljit Productions. It stars Dharmendra and Sharmila Tagore in the lead roles, supported by Mumtaz, Rehman and Om Prakash. The music is composed by Laxmikant–Pyarelal and the lyrics of the songs are penned by Majrooh Sultanpuri.

== Plot summary ==
Sunil lives a middle class life with his mother and sister in Delhi. He works for Chopra & Co., Chartered Accountants. He comes across a beautiful woman, Anita posing for a painting, and thinks she is poor and needy, and gives her a tip. The woman's name is Anita, and both are attracted to each other. Sunil and Anita intend to marry, and Sunil even introduces Anita to his mother. One day when attending a party, Sunil is shocked to learn that Anita is a multi-millionaire. Stunned at this deception, he swears he will have nothing to do with her. When Anita attempts to soothe things over, Sunil does cool down. It is then he finds out that Anita's dad, who is serving time, had killed his father, and that Anita's mother is still alive, after making her living as a former prostitute.

== Cast ==
- Dharmendra as Sunil
- Sharmila Tagore as Anita (Sunil’s girlfriend and fiancée)
- Rehman as Ajit Narang
- Mumtaz as Meena (Anita’s sister)
- Om Prakash as Dhand Melaram (Sunil’s friend)
- Achala Sachdev as Sunil's mother
- Nigar Sultana as Mohini (Anita and Meena’s mother)
- Ruby Myers as Mrs. Modi
- Santosh Kumar as Ramesh
- Brahm Bhardwaj as Chopra
- Roopesh Kumar as Guest in Party (Cameo Role)

== Music and soundtrack ==
The music of the film was composed by Laxmikant–Pyarelal and the lyrics are penned by Majrooh Sultanpuri.

No.	Title	Singer(s)	Length
1.	"Chhalka Yeh Jaam"	Mohammad Rafi	04:50
2.	"Chalo Sajna Jhahan Tak" (Raga Charukeshi)	Lata Mangeshkar	04:48
3.	"Na Ja Kahin Ab Na Ja"	Mohammad Rafi	06:19
4.	"Allah Yeh Ada Kaisi"	Lata Mangeshkar	07:11
5.	"Hui Sham Unka Khayal Aa Gaya"	Mohammad Rafi	04:31
6.	"Hamen To Ho Gaya Hai Pyar"	Lata Mangeshkar	04:01
7.	"Tum Jao Kahin"	Lata Mangeshkar	05:08
