= Seeta Aur Geeta =

- Film poster
- Directed by: Ramesh Sippy
- Screenplay by: Salim–Javed; Satish Bhatnagar
- Story by: Satish Bhatnagar
- Dialogues by: Salim–Javed
- Produced by: G. P. Sippy
- Starring: Hema Malini; Dharmendra; Sanjeev Kumar; Roopesh Kumar; Manorama; Satyen Kappu; Honey Irani; Pratima Devi
- Cinematography: K. Vaikunth
- Edited by: M. S. Shinde
- Music by: R. D. Burman
- Production company: Sippy Films
- Distributed by: NH Studioz
- Release date: 5 November 1972 (India)
- Running time: 162 minutes
- Country: India
- Language: Hindi
- Budget: ₹40 lakh ($53,000)
- Box office: est. ₹19.53 crore ($22.82 million)

Seeta Aur Geeta (transl. Seeta and Geeta) is a 1972 Indian Hindi-language comedy drama film directed by Ramesh Sippy and written by Salim–Javed and Satish Bhatnagar. The film stars Hema Malini in a dual role playing the titular identical twins who are separated at birth and grow up with different temperaments. When they meet as adults, they swap places. The sisters' lovers are portrayed by Sanjeev Kumar and Dharmendra, while Manorama portrays the villainous aunt. The ensemble cast includes Roopesh Kumar, Satyen Kappu, Honey Irani and Pratima Devi.

The 1967 blockbuster film Ram Aur Shyam inspired Salim-Javed and Bhatnagar to write Seeta Aur Geeta, which subverted the formula by having the heroine eventually become the "hero" while the male lead is in a mostly supporting role. The music was composed by R. D. Burman.

Released in India on 3 November 1972, Seeta Aur Geeta became a major hit, both in India and abroad in the Soviet Union. It emerged as one of the highest-grossing Hindi films of the year. Hema Malini won her only competitive Filmfare Best Actress Award of her career, while K. Vaikunth won the Filmfare Best Cinematographer Award. Malini was noted for the novelty of her performance as Geeta, who is rambunctious and sometimes even violent. Over the decades Seeta Aur Geeta has been remade in several other Indian languages.

== Plot ==
Twin girls Seeta and Geeta are both separated at birth. Seeta, the long-suffering heiress, is treated worse than a servant by her abusive, money-grubbing aunt Kaushalya, her spoilt daughter Sheela and her equally cruel brother Ranjeet, even though they live off Seeta's late parents' money. Seeta's only consolations are her meek uncle Badrinath and her elderly grandmother. Meanwhile, Geeta grows up to be a feisty girl raised in a slum and works as a street performer along with Raka, her friend and neighbour.

One day, Seeta decides that life is not worth living and runs away from home to commit suicide. She is rescued but misunderstood to be Geeta and taken to Geeta's home by Raka. Meanwhile, after a frantic search for Seeta, Badrinath and Kaushalya find Geeta, mistake her to be Seeta and attempt to force her to come home with them. But using some clever tricks, Geeta escapes from them and the police who have been searching for Seeta. She then meets Ravi, Seeta's prospective groom, who believes her to be Seeta as well and takes her to his home. Ravi is surprised by this "Seeta" and falls in love with Geeta.

Meanwhile, the real Seeta is living at Geeta's home, where Geeta's foster mother and Raka are surprised by the sudden gentle nature of "Geeta" and her desire to do the housework. When Raka attempts to coax Seeta into performing, she is unable to do so, however, Raka falls in love with Seeta. Elsewhere, the real Geeta is living at Seeta's home where she realises the cruelty that Seeta has been living under. She vows to teach Kaushalya and Ranjeet a lesson and begins to set everything on a proper course. In the process, Geeta resumes control of the money and restores her grandmother to the head of the household where she belongs.

However, things take a drastic turn when Ranjeet sees the real Seeta in a marketplace and discovers the truth. As a result, Geeta's cover is blown and the police arrest her for impersonation. Meanwhile, Ranjit kidnaps Seeta and keeps her captured intending to marry her. His henchmen bring Ravi to treat Seeta’s wounds where he discovers her. Raka secretly releases Geeta from prison and reveals that she is Seeta's long-lost twin sister after learning about Geeta's true identity from her foster mother. This leads to Seeta, Geeta, Raka and Ravi fighting against Ranjeet and his henchmen and have the police arrest them all for their crimes. In the end, in the presence of Seeta and Geeta's grandmother, Badrinath and the reformed Kaushalya and Sheela, the real Seeta marries Raka while the real Geeta marries Ravi.

== Cast ==
- Hema Malini in dual role as Seeta & Geeta
- Dharmendra as Raka
- Sanjeev Kumar as Dr. Ravi
- Roopesh Kumar as Ranjeet
- Manorama as Kaushalya
- Satyen Kappu as Badrinath
- Pratima Devi as grandmother
- Honey Irani as Sheela
- Kamal Kapoor as Ravi's father
- Ratnamala as Ravi's mother
- Radhika Rani
- Master Ravi
- Kartar Singh (uncredited)
- Dev Krishna
- Alankar Joshi as Seeta’s and Geeta's younger brother
- Karan Dewan as Property Lawyer Gupta
- Keshav Rana as Inspector Rana
- M. B. Shetty as Ranjeet's henchman
- Dulari as Seeta and Geeta's late mother
- Abhi Bhattacharya as Seeta’s and Geeta's late father
- Asrani as Laughing Doctor

== Production ==
According to Salim Khan, one half of screenwriting duo Salim–Javed, the concept of Seeta Aur Geeta was inspired by the Dilip Kumar starrer Ram Aur Shyam (1967), but they altered the formula with twin female sisters. Seeta Aur Geeta subverted the formula by having the heroine Hema Malini eventually become the "hero" while male lead Sanjeev Kumar and Dharmendra is in a mostly supporting role.

Ramesh Sippy initially wanted Nutan as Seeta and Geeta because he "saw the heroine as a mature woman with a child" but he was advised against casting a heroine who was "at a mature phase of her career when the hero, too, was getting along in age." The film was also offered to popular actress Mumtaz, who ironically starred in Ram Aur Shyam, but she refused the offer as she wasn't paid enough. Mumtaz stated in an interview that at the time she was not offered her market price and she had to refuse the film. According to Sippy, the film's budget cost ₹40,00,000 ($53,000).

== Soundtrack ==
All the songs were composed by Rahul Dev Burman and lyrics were penned by Anand Bakshi.

Vocals were supplied by Kishore Kumar for Sanjeev Kumar, Lata Mangeshkar & Asha Bhosle for Hema Malini and Manna Dey for Dharmendra.

#	Song	Singer(s)	Duration	Notes
1	"Arey Zindagi Hai Khel"	Manna Dey, Asha Bhosle	04:43	Picturised on Hema Malini (as Geeta) and Dharmendra
2	"O Saathi Chal"	Kishore Kumar, Asha Bhosle	04:29	Picturised on Hema Malini and Sanjeev Kumar
3	"Koi Ladki Mujhe Kal Raat"	Kishore Kumar, Lata Mangeshkar	04:20	Picturised on Hema Malini (as Geeta) and Sanjeev Kumar
4	"Haan Ji Haan Maine Sharaab"	Lata Mangeshkar	05:26	Picturised on Hema Malini (as Geeta)
5	"Abhi to Haath Mein Jaam"	Manna Dey	05:31	Picturised on Dharmendra

== Reception ==
=== Box office ===
Domestically in India, the film grossed ₹3.5 crore (US$4.61 million) in 1972. (Note: 7.5945 Indian rupees per US dollar in 1972) Adjusted for inflation, this is equivalent to ₹465 crore in 2017. (Note: Inflation rate from 1993 to 2017: 21.38 times: Aankhen's domestic nett of ₹12.845 crore in 1993 equivalent to ₹274.584584 crore in 2017.)

Overseas in the Soviet Union, the film grossed 13.8 million SUR (Note: 55.2 million tickets sold, average ticket price of 25 kopecks) (US$18.21 million, (Note: 0.758 Soviet rubles per US dollar in 1976) ₹16.03 crore) (Note: 8.804 Indian rupees per US dollar in 1976) in 1976. Adjusted for inflation, this is equivalent to $78 million (₹754 crore) in 2017.

Worldwide, the film grossed ₹19.53 crore (US$22.82 million). Adjusted for inflation, this is equivalent to ₹1,014 crore in 2017, or ₹1,552 crore (US$160 million) in 2026.

In terms of footfalls, the film sold an estimated 33 million tickets in India (Note: See List of highest-grossing films in India § Highest-grossing films by year) and 55.2 million tickets in the Soviet Union, for an estimated total of 88.2 million tickets sold worldwide.

=== Awards ===
20th Filmfare Awards

Category	Nominee	Result
Best Actress	Hema Malini	Won
Best Cinematographer	K. Vaikunth	Won

== Series ==
Bohra Bros had made a television series based on this film which was aired on NDTV Imagine in 2009. Coincidentally Hema Malini did a similar series on same plot called Kamini Damini which was aired on Sahara One on 2004.
