= Aa Jaane Jaan =

Song from the 1969 Hindi film Intaqam

"Aa Jaan-E-Jaan"

Song by Lata Mangeshkar

from the album Intaquam
- Released: 1969
- Genre: World Music, Filmi
- Length: 6:27
- Songwriter: Rajinder Krishan
- Producer: Laxmikant Pyarelal

"Aa Jaan-E-Jaan" (transl. Come here, my dear) is a song from the 1969 Hindi film Intaqam. It is one of the few cabaret songs sung by Lata Mangeshkar, and was an iconic song in India from the 1960s. It was picturised on Helen.

== Background ==
Lata Mangeshkar did not like singing cabaret songs, and music directors would usually prefer her sister Asha Bhosle for singing them. This song is an exception. The song was tuned and styled in accordance with Lata's style and preference. When asked about the song, Lata Mangeshkar laughed and said, "I remember telling Laxmikant not to give me any cabaret songs to sing. He assured me I could sing it without a hitch. Aa jaan-e-jaan was tailored to suit my taste and style." The song became an instant hit on the charts, with Helen dancing synchronously with the complete song.

== Cover versions ==
A remixed version of the song was also featured in the dance music album, Dance Masti Forever (2006) by band Instant Karma as Aa Jaan-E-Jaan (The Baby Can You Feel The Magic Mix). Another remix version was done by DJ Suketu from the album WILD 10. Another cover version of the song was featured in film, Hello Darling (2010) as item number performed by Celina Jaitley. It was sung by Antara Mitra and Akriti Kakkar.

In 2023, Neha Kakkar sang a cover version of the song for the film Jaane Jaan composed by Sachin-Jigar.
