= Mere Sanam =

- Directed by: Amar Kumar
- Written by: Narendra Bedi (story); Rajinder Singh Bedi (screenplay and dialogues)
- Produced by: G. P. Sippy
- Starring: Biswajeet; Asha Parekh; Mumtaz; Pran
- Cinematography: K Vaikunth
- Edited by: M. S. Shinde
- Music by: O. P. Nayyar
- Distributed by: Ramesh Sippy Entertainment
- Release date: 13 November 1965
- Country: India
- Language: Hindi

Mere Sanam (English: My Lover) is a 1965 Indian Hindi-language romantic musical film directed by Amar Kumar and written by Narendra Bedi and Rajinder Singh Bedi. It stars Biswajeet, Asha Parekh, Mumtaz, Pran and Rajendra Nath. The film was a hit at the box office, especially because of the music composed by O. P. Nayyar. The songs were sung by Asha Bhosle & Mohammed Rafi to the lyrics written by Majrooh Sultanpuri. The film was shot in Jammu and Kashmir just before the outbreak of Indo-Pakistani war of 1965.

The songs "Jaiye Aap Kahan Jayenge", "Yeh Hai Reshmi Zulfon Ka Andhera", "Pukarta Chala Hoon Main" and "Humdum Mere Maan Bhi Jao" are milestones in Hindi film music.

== Story ==
Neena is on an excursion trip to Jammu and Kashmir, in the company of her mother Savitri Devi, who is also the warden of their girls hostel in Lucknow and several female friends. During their journey, they decide to stay at the Dreamland Hotel. The hero, Kumar, who actually owns the property and has been so far unaware that the caretaker Shyam is running a hotel, arrives, and asks the caretaker to get the surprised group to leave, as he is perturbed by the fact that his residential bungalow has been converted into the Dreamland Hotel! The caretaker, Shyam explains to the girls that Kumar is mentally unstable and under the impression that he is the owner of the hotel. Shyam is then revealed to the audience as a criminal involved in illegal activities. But the hotel Manager Banke and his son and guide for tourists Pyarelal are unaware of Shyam’s illegal activities.

Kumar is the heir apparent to his uncle, Mr. Mehra's industrial empire and cotton mills as his father and Mr. Mehra were the best of friends. Mr. Mehra had relocated to Africa for business, leaving his two-year-old daughter and his wife in her paternal home, subsequent to which came partition of India, which displaced his family.

Meanwhile, during the trip itself, Shyam discovers through his servant, who had previously served under Mr. Mehra, that Savitri Devi is the lost wife of Mr. Mehra and Neena their daughter and thus true heir. He thus tries to cultivate both mother and daughter in the hope of usurping Mr. Mehra's wealth.

After several misunderstandings and an altercation with goons at the nightclub of the hotel, because of Neena, Kumar and Neena fall in love and express their desire to marry to Mr. Mehra, who disapproves. Kumar also gets friendly with Pyarelal.

Subsequently, Shyam meets up with Kamini "Kamo" and pays her to try and seduce Kumar and take photographs of the encounter, while the seduction fails Kamo gets some photos which Shyam shares with Neena and her mother. Then Kamo blackmails Shyam to give her more money to keep these secrets, whereupon he gets her killed. Kumar, to prove his innocence over the photos, barges into Kamini's room to find her dead, and is thus blamed for her murder by eyewitnesses who see him there!

Savitri Devi is united with her husband, on a chance meeting, Pyarelal deduces Neena’s father’s identify and takes Neena away, and tells her about her true father, Shyam's bad intentions for her, and Kumar's innocence in Kamo's murder. Both of them chance to hear Shyam plotting to get Kumar shot at the beat of cymbals, to be killed during a dance performance at the International club. Pyare silences the real dancer and replaces Neena with her and thus they are able to save Kumar from an untimely ghastly death. But Shyam grabs hold of Neena and escapes in his car to his hide out. He is chased by Kumar and overpowered there, along with the timely arrival of the police, thus resulting in a happy ending of the real family uniting together.

== Cast ==
- Biswajeet as Kumar
- Asha Parekh as Neena Mehra
- Mumtaz as Kamini "Kammo"
- Pran as Shyam
- Rajendra Nath as Pyarelal
- Nazir Hussain as Mr. Mehra
- Achala Sachdev as Savitri Mehra
- Dhumal as Banke
- Asit Sen as Inspector Gopichand
- Laxmi Chhaya as Rita
- Ram Avtar as stout jeep owner at check post
- Jeevankala as lady car owner
- Dev Kishan as Lalchand, Shyam's assistant
- Maqsood as goon in Shyam's den

== Soundtrack ==
Mere Sanam

Soundtrack album by O. P. Nayyar
- Released: 13 November 1965
- Genre: Feature film soundtrack
- Label: Saregama

The soundtrack is composed by O. P. Nayyar, while the lyrics are penned by lyricist Majrooh Sultanpuri. The soundtrack consists of 9 songs. Singers such as Mohammad Rafi and Asha Bhosle have done the playback for the songs of the album. There is also a small alap, which Mohammed Rafi takes in the beginning of the song "Jaiye Aap Kahan Jayenge".

Song	Singer	Raga
"Pukarta Chala Hoon Main"	Mohammed Rafi	Kirwani
"Bhala Mano, Bura Mano"	Mohammed Rafi	
"Tukde Hai Mere Dil Ke"	Mohammed Rafi	Pahadi
"Humdum Mere"	Mohammed Rafi	
"Roka Kayi Baar Maine Dil Ki Umang Ko"	Mohammed Rafi, Asha Bhosle	
"Humne To Dil Ko Aapke Kadmon Pe Rakh Diya"	Mohammed Rafi, Asha Bhosle	Pahadi
"Haan Ji, Haan Ji, Haan Ji, Arey Haan Ji Baba"	Mohammed Rafi, Asha Bhosle	
"Jaiye Aap Kahan Jayenge"	Asha Bhosle	Pilu
"Yeh Hai Reshmi Zulfon Ka"	Asha Bhosle	
