= List of Hindi films of 1964 =

A list of films produced by the Bollywood film industry based in Mumbai in 1964:

== Highest-grossing films ==
The ten highest-grossing films at the Indian box office in 1964:

Rank	Title	Gross collection
1	Sangam	₹8 crore
2	Ayee Milan Ki Bela	₹4.5 crore
3	Dosti	₹4 crore
4	Ziddi	₹3.5 crore
5	Rajkumar	₹3 crore
6	Kashmir Ki Kali	₹2.6 crore
7	Haqeeqat	₹2.5 crore
8	Zindagi	₹2 crore
9	April Fool	₹1.9 crore
10	Woh Kaun Thi?	₹1.8 crore

== A-G ==
Title	Director	Cast	Genre	Notes
Aandhi Aur Toofan	Mohammed Hussain	Dara Singh, Mumtaz, Jeevan, Bhagwan, Maruti, Kamran	Action Adventure	Music: Robin Banerjee; Lyrics: Faruk Kaiser
Aao Pyaar Karen	R. K. Nayyar	Joy Mukherjee, Saira Banu, Rajendra Nath, Madhvi, Jayant, Shyam Chatterjee	Romance Drama	Music: Usha Khanna; Lyrics:Rajendra Krishan
Aap Ki Parchhaiyan	Mohan Kumar	Dharmendra, Supriya Chowdhury, Shashikala, Om Prakash, Leela Chitnis, Vijayalaxmi, Manorama	Romance Drama	Music: Madan Mohan; Lyrics: Raja Mehdi Ali Khan
Aaya Toofan	Kedar Kapoor, Mohammed Hussain	Dara Singh, Nishi, Helen, Anwar Hussain, Randhawa, Indira Billi, Maruti, Tun Tun	Action	Music: Laxmikant Pyarelal; Lyrics: Asad Bhopali
Apne Huye Paraye	Ajit Chakraborty	Mala Sinha, Manoj Kumar, Shashikala, Lalita Pawar, Dulari, Agha, Iftekhar, Sunder	Romantic love triangle	Music: Shankar Jaikishan; Lyrics: Hasrat Jaipuri, Shailendra
April Fool	Subodh Mukherjee	Biswajeet, Saira Banu, Nazima, I. S. Johar, Jayant, Sajjan, Chand Usmani, Ram Avtar, Shetty	Romance Musical	Music: Shankar Jaikishan; Lyrics: Hasrat Jaipuri, Shailendra
Arab Ka Lal	A. Shamsheer	Samar Roy, Indra Billi, Sherry, Leela, Dilawar, Shyam Kumar	Costume Action	Music: S. Kishan; Lyrics: A. Shamsheer
Awara Badal	Kedar Kapoor	Ajit, Ragini, Helen, Indira Billi, Leela Mishra Jagdish Sethi, Dhumal	Action	Music: Usha Khanna; Lyrics: Javed Anwar, Anand Bakshi, Jan Nisar Akhtar
Ayee Milan Ki Bela	Mohan Kumar	Rajendra Kumar, Saira Banu, Dharmendra, Shashikala, Madan Puri, Nazir Hussain, Sulochana, Sunder, Mumtaz Begum	Romantic Drama	Music: Shankar Jaikishan; Lyrics: Hasrat Jaipuri, Shailendra
Badshah	Chandrakant	Dara Singh, Nishi, Tiwari, Rani, Shakila Bano Bhopali, Maruti, Rajan Haksar	Costume Action	Music: Datta Naik; Lyrics: Anand Bakshi
Baghi	Ram Dayal	Pradeep Kumar, Leela Naidu, Mumtaz, Jeevan, Veena, Helen, Vijaya Chaudhary, Jagdeep	Costume Action	Music: Chitragupta; Lyrics: Hasrat Jaipuri
Baghi Shahzada	Maruti Rao	Kishore Kumar, Kumkum, Madhumati, Maruti, B. M. Vyas, Anwar Hussain, W. M. Khan	Action	Music: Bipin Babul; Lyrics: Noor Devasi & Raja Mehdi Ali Khan
Benazir	Bimal Roy	Ashok Kumar, Meena Kumari, Shashi Kapoor, Tanuja, Durga Khote, Nirupa Roy, Tarun Bose, Asit Sen	Social Muslim Drama	Music: S. D. Burman; Lyrics: Shakeel Badayuni
Beti Bete	T L V Prasad	Sunil Dutt, Saroja Devi, Jamuna, Mehmood, Shobha Khote, Jayant, Agha	Family Drama	Music: Shankar Jaikishan; Lyrics: Hasrat Jaipuri, Shailendra
Bhakta Dhruvakumar	Dhirubhai Desai	Shahu Modak, Nirupa Roy, Babloo, Indira Billi, Sunder, Niranjan Sharma	Devotional	Music: Avinash Vyas; Lyrics: Madan Bharti, Avinash Vyas
Birju Ustad	Manu Desai	Sheikh Mukhtar, Vijaya Choudhary, Chandrashekhar, Mukri, Tun Tun	Action	Music: Kalyanji Anandji; Lyrics: Qamar Jalalabadi
Captain Azad	Ram Rasila	Azad, Neelam Kumari, Aruna Irani, Heera Sawant, Maqbul, Majnu, Habib	Costume Action	Music: Piter Nawab; Lyrics: M. M. Khan
Cha Cha Cha	Chandrashekhar	Om Prakash, Bela Bose, Madan Puri, Iftekhar, Tun Tun	Musical Dance Drama	Music: Iqbal Qureshi; Lyrics: Bharat Vyas, Maqdoom Mohiuddin, Neeraj
Challenge	B. J. Patel	Ranjan, Chitra, Bela Bose, Tiwari, Polson, Maruti, Indira Bansal	Action	Music: Ajit Merchant; Lyrics: Prem Dhawa
Chandi Ki Deewar	Dilip Bose	Bharat Bhushan, Nutan, Indrani Mukherjee, Asit Sen, Sudhir, Naaz, Honey Irani, Pratima Devi	Romantic drama	Music: N. Dutta; Lyrics: Sahir Ludhianvi
Char Dervesh	Homi Wadia	Feroz Khan, Sayeeda Khan, Naaz, B. M. Vyas, Mukri, Sunder	Fantasy	Music: G. S. Kohli; Lyrics: Anjaan, Saba Fazli, Raja Mehdi Ali Kha
Chitralekha	Kidar Sharma	Ashok Kumar, Meena Kumari, Pradeep Kumar, Mehmood, Zeb Rehman, Achla Sachdev, Minu Mumtaz, Bela Bose	Historical romantic drama	Music: Roshan; Lyrics: Sahir Ludhianvi
Daal Me Kala	Satyen Bose	Kishore Kumar, Nimmi, Agha, Om Prakash, Bipin Gupta, Abhi Bhattacharya, Sajjan, Shammi	Comedy	Music: C. Ramchandra; Lyrics: Majrooh Sultanpuri, Raja Mehdi Ali Khan, Bharat Vyas, Pyarelal Santoshi
Dara Singh	Kedar Kapoor	Dara Singh, Nishi, Jeevan, Salim Khan, Tabassum, Tiwari, Mohan Choti	Action	Music: Hansraj Behl; Lyrics: Prem Dhawan
Dooj Ka Chaand	Nitin Bose	Ashok Kumar, Bharat Bhushan, B. Saroja Devi, Raaj Kumar, Azra, Chandrashekhar, Ulhas, Agha	Drama	Music: Roshan; Lyrics: Sahir Ludhianvi
Door Gagan Ki Chhaon Mein	Kishore Kumar	Kishore Kumar, Supriya Chowdhury, Amit Kumar, Shashikala, Iftekhar, Sajjan, Raj Mehra, Nana Palsikar, Leela Mishra	Drama	Music: Kishore Kumar; Lyrics: Kishore Kumar, Shailendra
Door Ki Awaaz	Devendra Goel	Joy Mukherjee, Saira Banu, Johnny Walker, Pran, Durga Khote, Om Prakash, Mallika	Romantic drama	Music: Ravi; Lyrics: Shakeel Badayuni
Dosti	Satyen Bose	Sudhir Kumar, Sushil Kumar, Sanjay Khan, Farida, Leela Mishra, Nana Palsikar, Leela Chitnis, Abhi Bhattacharya	Social Drama	Entered into the 4th Moscow International Film Festival. Music: Laxmikant Pyarelal; Lyrics: Majrooh Sultanpuri
Dulha Dulhan	Ravindra Dave	Raj Kapoor, Sadhana, K. N. Singh, Agha, Madhumati, Raj Mehra	Romantic drama	Music: Kalyanji Anandji; Lyrics: Anand Bakshi, Indeevar Gulshan Bawra, Haroon
Ek Din Ka Badshah	Jugal Kishore	P. Jairaj, Nishi, Jugal Kishore, Sunder, Mohan Choti	Costume Action	Music: Hansraj Behl; Lyrics: Gulshan Bawra, Prem Warbartani
Fariyad	Kidar Sharma	Ashok Sharma, Zeb Rehman, Nazima, Achala Sachdev, Tun Tun, Bela Bose, Gopal Saigal	Social Family Drama	Music: Snehal Bhatkar; Lyrics: Kidar Sharma
Gazal	Ved Madan	Sunil Dutt, Meena Kumari, Rehman, Mehmood, Nazima, Prithviraj Kapoor, Rajendra Nath, Raj Mehra	Romantic Muslim social	Music: Madan Mohan; Lyrics: Sahir Ludhianvi
Ganga Ki Lahren	Devi Sharma	Kishore Kumar, Dharmendra, Kumkum, Savitri, Nazir Hussain, Azra	Drama	Music: Chitragupta; Lyrics: Majrooh Sultanpuri
Geet Gaya Patharon Ne	V. Shantaram	Jeetendra, Rajshree, Nana Palsikar, Surendra, Babloo	Romantic Drama	Music: Ramlal Hira-Panna; Lyrics: Hasrat Jaipuri, Vishwamitra Adil

== H-K ==
Title	Director	Cast	Genre	Notes
Hamara Ghar	K. A. Abbas	Dilip Raj, Surekha, Sonal Mehta, Rekha Rao, Nana Palsikar, Yasmeen Khan	Children Adventure	Music: J. P. Kaushik; Lyrics: Ali Sardar Jafri, Muhammad Iqbal
Hamara Rashtragan a.k.a. Our National Anthem	Pramod Pati		Documentary	
Hameer Hath	Jaswant Jhaveri	Nirupa Roy, P. Jairaj, Anita Guha, Manhar Desai, Vijay Choudhary, Sapru, B. M. Vyas	Legend Action	Music: Sanmukh Babu Upadhyay; Lyrics: Neelkanth Tiwari, Uday Khanna, Saraswati Kumar Deepak
Haqeeqat	Chetan Anand	Balraj Sahni, Dharmendra, Sanjay Khan, Priya Rajhvans,	War	Music: Madan Mohan; Lyrics: Kaifi Azmi
Hercules	Shriram	Dara Singh, Nishi, Mumtaz, Helen, Maruti, B. M. Vyas, Indira	Action	Music: N Dutta; Lyrics: Anand Bakshi
Ishaara	K. Amarnath	Joy Mukherjee, Vyjayanthimala, Pran, Subiraj, Azra, Jayant	Melodrama	Music: Kalyanji Anandji; Lyrics: Majrooh Sultanpuri
Jahan Ara	Vinod Kumar	Bharat Bhushan, Mala Sinha, Shashikala, Prithviraj Kapoor, Sunder, Minu Mumtaz, Chandrashekhar, Achala Sachdev, Om Prakash	Historical romantic-fiction drama	Music: Madan Mohan; Lyrics: Rajendra Krishan
Jantar Mantar	Radhakant	Mahipal, Vijaya Choudhury, Ulhas	Fantasy	Music: Sardar Malik; Lyrics: Hasrat Jaipuri
Ji Chahta Hai	Bibhuti Mitra	Joy Mukherjee, Rajshree, Motilal, Shyama, Rajendra Nath, Jeevan, Achla Sachdev	Romantic drama	Music: Kalyanji Anandji; Lyrics: Hasrat Jaipuri
Kaise Kahoon	Atma Ram	Biswajeet, Nanda, Rehman, Naaz, Om Prakash, Manmohan, Asit Sen, Durga Khote	Melodrama	Music: S. D. Burman; Lyrics: Shakeel Badayuni
Kashmir Ki Kali	Shakti Samanta	Shammi Kapoor, Sharmila Tagore, Pran, Anoop Kumar, Nazir Hussain, Madan Puri, Sunder, Tun Tun, Dhumal	Romantic Musical	Music: O. P. Nayyar; Lyrics: S. H. Bihari
Khufia Mahal	Akkoo	P. Jairaj, Chitra, Tun Tun, Sherry, Sheikh, Paul Sharma	Fantasy Horror	Music: Pardesi; Lyrics: Zafar Rahi, Shyam Hindi
Kohra	Biren Nag	Waheeda Rehman, Biswajeet, Lalita Pawar, Madan Puri, Manmohan Krishna, Abhi Bhattacharya	Thriller, Mystery	Music: Hemant Kumar; Lyrics: Kaifi Azmi

== L-Q ==
Title	Director	Cast	Genre	Notes
Leader	Ram Mukherjee	Dilip Kumar, Vyjayanthimala		
Magic Carpet	Bhabubhai Mistry	Aazad Irani, Master Bhagwan, Chitra	Fantasy	
Mahasati Anusuya	Dhirubhai Desai	Anita Gua, Sahu Modak		
Mahasati Behula	Shanti Kumar	Mahipal, Jaya Mala, Lalita Pawar		
Maikhana	Nakhshab Jharchavi	Shamim Ara, Hanif, Rehman, Firdous		
Main Bhi Ladki Hoon	A. C. Tirulokchandar	Dharmendra, Meena Kumari, Balraj Sahni		
Main Suhagan Hoon	Kundan Kumar	Nishi Kholi, Kewal Kumar, Mala Sinha		
Majboor	Narendra Suri	Waheeda Rehman, Biswajeet, Naaz	Drama	
Mera Qasoor Kya Hai	Krishnan–Panju	Dharmendra, Om Prakash, Nanda		
Mr. X in Bombay	Shantilal Soni	Kishore Kumar, Kumkum	Science Fiction, Thriller	
Phoolon Ki Sej	Inder Raj Anand	Ashok Kumar, Vyjayanthimala, Manoj Kumar	Social	
Picnic	R. S. Tara	Guru Dutt, Sadhana		
Pooja Ke Phool	A. Bhimsingh	Dharmendra, Ashok Kumar, Mala Sinha, Pran	Drama	
Punar Milan	Ravindra Dave	Ameeta, Mumtaz Begum, Leela Chitnis		
Qawwali Ki Raat	Durgesh Kumar, P. L. Santhosi	Kamaljeet, Kumkum, Mumtaz, Aruna Irani	Drama	

== R-S ==
Title	Director	Cast	Genre	Notes
Rahul	Ram Narayan Gabale	Ratnamala, Chaman Puri, Achala Sachdev		
Rajkumar	K. Shankar	Shammi Kapoor, Sadhana, Rajendra Nath, Pran	Musical/Action	
Roop Sundari	Radhakant	Mahipal, Bela Bose, Laxmi Chahya		
Rustom-E-Rome	RadhaKant	Dara Singh, Aazad Irani, Vijaya Choudhury	Action. Adventure	
Samson	Nanabhai Bhatt	Dara Singh, Ameeta, Feroz Khan, B. M. Vyas, Mumtaz, Mohan Choti		
Sangam	Raj Kapoor	Raj Kapoor, Vyjayanthimala, Rajendra Kumar	Social	
Sanjh Aur Savera	Hrishikesh Mukherjee	Guru Dutt, Meena Kumari, Mehmood	Romance, Drama	
Sant Gyaneshwar	Manibhai Vyas	Sudhir Kumar, Surekha, Babloo	Devotional	
Sarfarosh	Dharam Kumar	Nishi Kholi, Pratima Devi, Jeevan		
Sati Savitri	Shantilal Soni	Mahipal, Jeevan	Religious	
Shabnam	Aspi Irani	Mehmood, Helen		
Shagoon	Nazir	Kamaljeet, Nana Palsikar, Waheeda Rehman	Drama	
Sharabi	Rajrishi	Dev Anand, Madhubala, Radhakrishan, Badri Prasad, Daisy Irani, Lalita Pawar, Sulochana, Ram Mohan, Ravikant, Pardesi	Social Romance	Music: Madan Mohan Lyrics: Rajendra Krishan
Shehnai	S. D. Narang	Biswajeet, Rajshree, Johnny Walker, Chand Usmani, Nirupa Roy, Praveen Choudhary, Iftekhar, Sapru, Honey Irani, Laxmi Chhaya, Asit Sen	Social Family Drama	Music: Ravi Lyrics:Rajendra Krishan
Subhadra Haran	Datta Dharamadhikari	Shahu Modak, Jayshree Gadkar, Chitra, Suryakant, Arun Sarnaik	Mythology	Music: Prabhakar Jog; Lyrics: Saraswati Kumar Deepak.
Suhagan	K. S. Gopalakrishnan	Guru Dutt, Mala Sinha, Feroz Khan, Devan Varma	Drama. Romance	

== T-Z ==
Title	Director	Cast	Genre	Notes
Tarzan Aur Jalpari	Radhakant	Aazad Irani, Ranjan Kapoor, Laxmi Chahya	Action Adventure	
Tere Dwaar Khada Bhagwan	Ravindra Dave	Ruby Myers, Shahu Modak, Durga Khote		
Veer Bhimsen	Chandrakanth	Dara Singh, Mumtaz	Epic	
Vidyapati	Prahalad Sharma	Bharat Bhushan, Simi Garewal, Bipin Gupta	Historical	
Woh Kaun Thi?	Raj Khosla	Manoj Kumar, Sadhana, Prem Chopra,	Horror	
Yaadein	Sunil Dutt	Sunil Dutt, Nargis Dutt	Drama	
Ziddi	Pramod Chakravorty	Joy Mukherjee, Asha Parekh	Drama	
Zindagi	Ramanand Sagar	Rajendra Kumar, Vyjayanthimala	Drama	
