= Bhanu Athaiya =

Indian costume designer and painter (1929–2020)

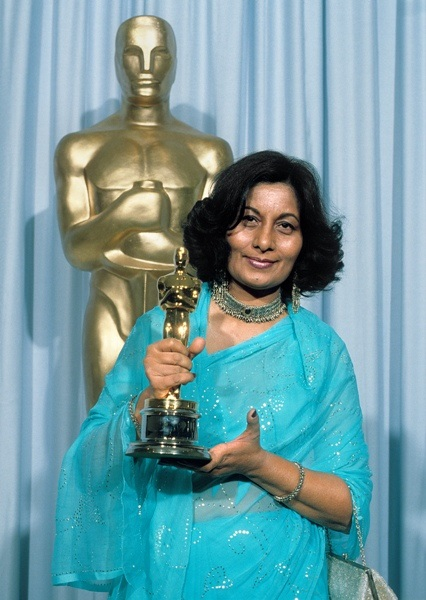
- Athaiya at the Academy Awards, 1983
- Born: Bhanumati Annasaheb Rajopadhye; 28 April 1929; Kolhapur, Kolhapur State, British India
- Died: 15 October 2020 (aged 91); Mumbai, Maharashtra, India
- Education: Sir J. J. School of Art
- Occupations: Costume designer and Painter
- Years active: 1947–2015
- Movement: Bombay Progressive Artists' Group
- Spouse: Satyendra Athaiya
- Awards: Usha Deshmukh Gold Medal - JJ School of Art (1951) for Lady In Repose; Academy Award for Costume Design (1983) for Gandhi; Nominated for BAFTA Award for Best Costume Design (1983) for Gandhi; National Film Award for Best Costume Design (1991) for 1991: Lekin...; National Film Award for Best Costume Design (2002) for Lagaan

Bhanu Athaiya (née Rajopadhye; 28 April 1929 – 15 October 2020) was an Indian costume designer and painter. She was the first Indian to win an Academy Award. Alongside being Bollywood's most iconic costume designer, she had a historically important early career as an artist with contemporaries like M. F. Husain, F. N. Souza and Vasudeo S. Gaitonde. She was the only woman member of the Bombay Progressive Artists' Group. Two of Bhanu Rajopadhye's artworks were included in the 1953 Progressive Artists' Group show in Bombay.

After her switch from art to cinema, Bhanu went on to become one of the leading creators of the aesthetic of a young India through her work on costumes for Bollywood films. She worked on over 100 films, with Indian filmmakers such as Guru Dutt, Yash Chopra, B.R. Chopra, Raj Kapoor, Vijay Anand, Raj Khosla, and Ashutosh Gowariker, notably in films like C.I.D. (1956), Pyaasa (1957), Sahib Bibi Aur Ghulam (1962), Guide (1965), Amrapali (1966), Teesri Manzil (1966), Satyam Shivam Sundaram (1979), Razia Sultan (1983), Chandni (1989), Lekin... (1990), 1942: A Love Story (1993), Lagaan (2001), and Swades (2004). She also worked on international projects with directors such Conrad Rooks in Siddhartha (1972) and Richard Attenborough in Gandhi (1982).

For Gandhi, Bhanu won the Academy Award for Best Costume Design and was nominated for a BAFTA Award for Best Costume Design.

She was honored in the 'In memoriam' segment of the 93rd Academy Awards.

== Early life and background ==
Bhanu was born into a Marathi Brahmin family in Kolhapur (in present-day Maharashtra). She was the third of seven children born to Annasaheb and Shantabai Rajopadhye. Athaiya's father, Annasaheb was a self-taught artist and photographer who worked in the films of Baburao Painter. He died when Athaiya was 11 years old.

She studied at Sir J J School of Art, Mumbai, where she won the Usha Deshmukh Gold medal in 1951 for the artwork titled 'Lady In Repose'.

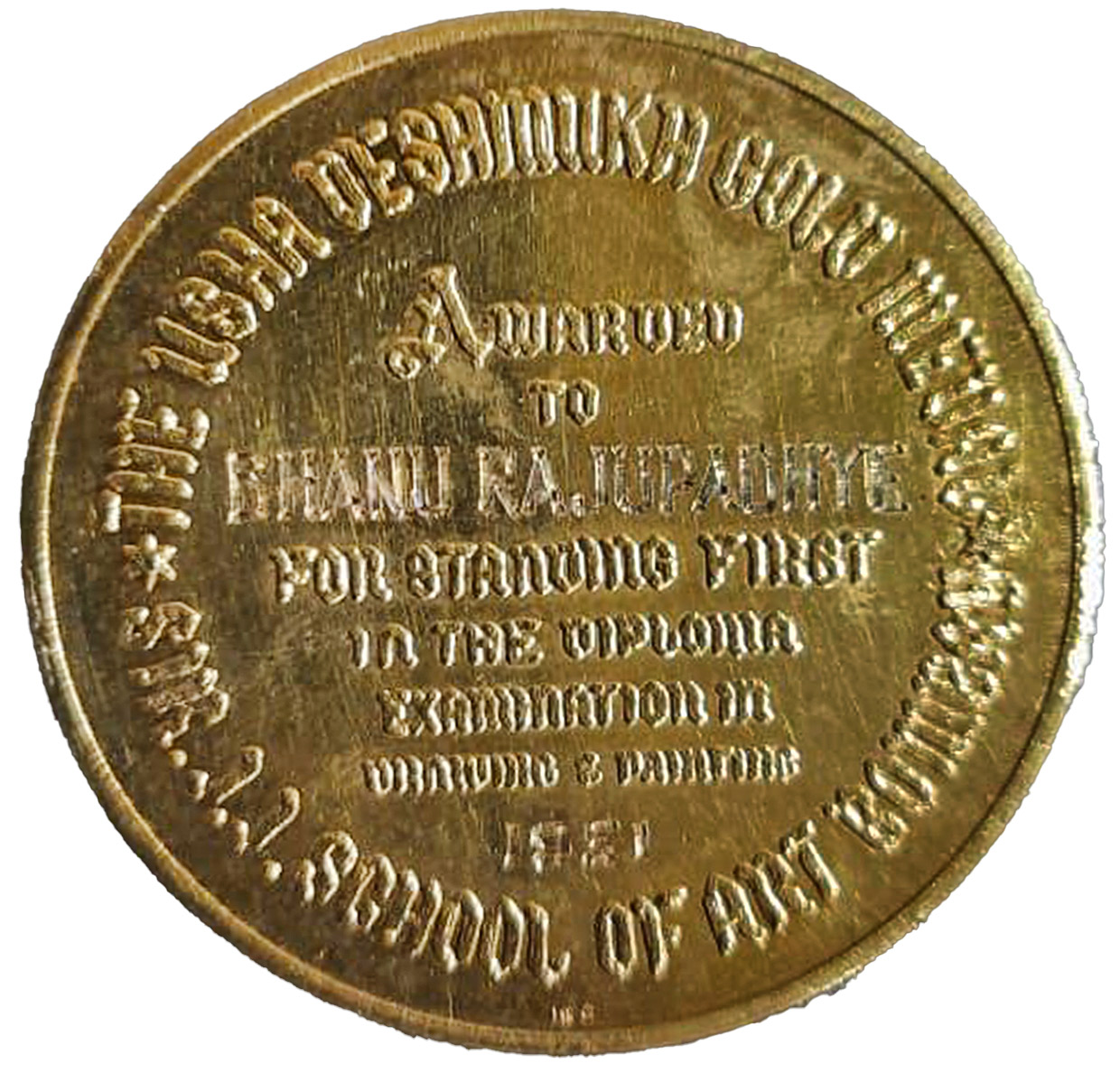
Gold Medal Awarded by JJ School of Art in 1951 - Verso

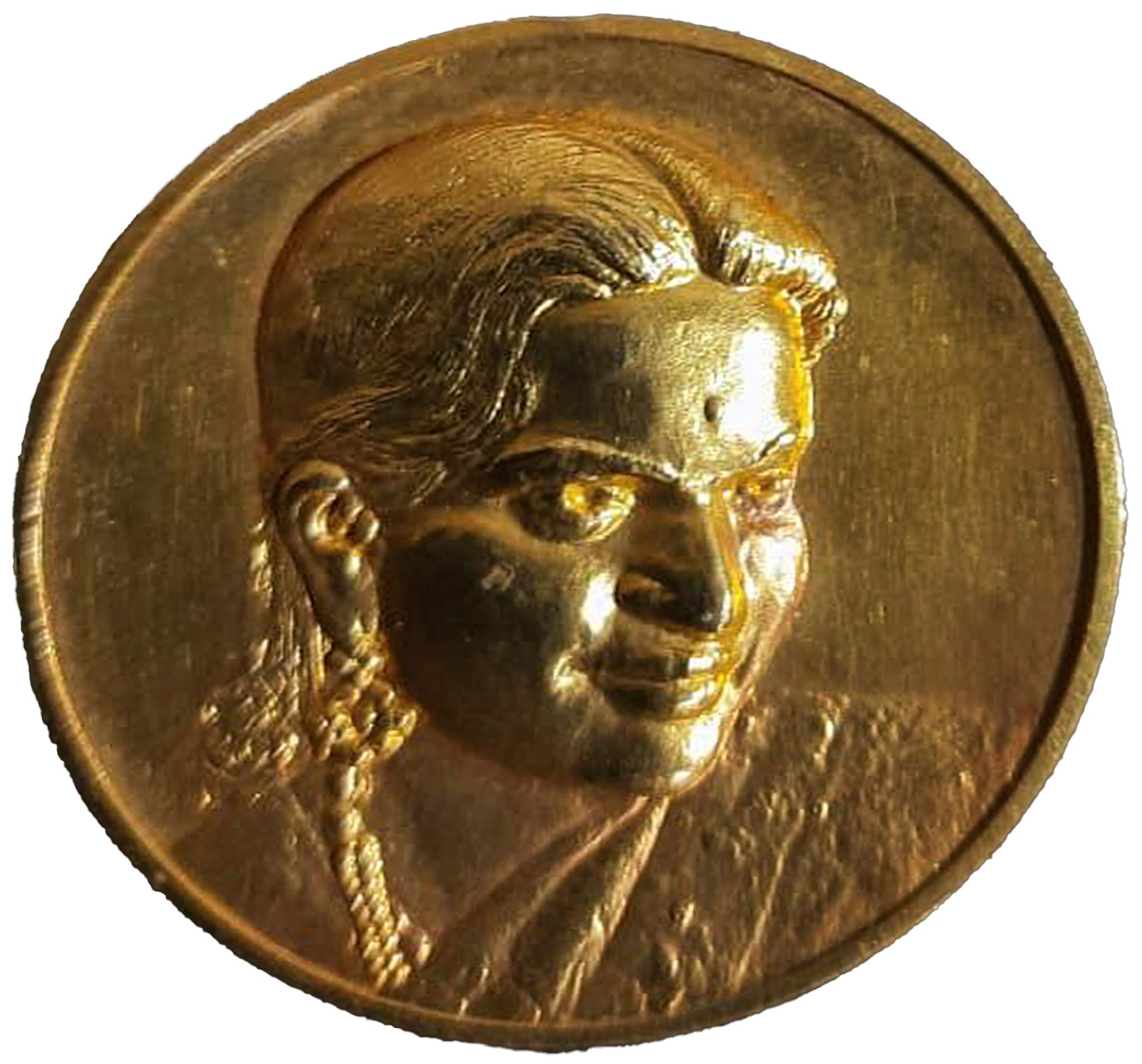
Gold Medal Awarded by JJ School of Art in 1951 - Recto

== Career ==
Bhanu started her career as an artist in Mumbai while still studying at JJ School of Art. Later she became a member of the Progressive Artists' Group and exhibited with them. She continued her part-time stint as a freelance fashion illustrator for women's magazine like "Eve's Weekly" and "Fashion & Beauty". while at the JJ School of Art. Later when the Eve's Weekly editor opened a boutique, she asked Athaiya to try designing dresses, hereupon she discovered her flair for designing clothes. Her success as a designer soon led to her switching career paths. Her costume designing career began by designing clothes for Guru Dutt's films, starting with C.I.D. (1956). She soon became a part of the Guru Dutt team.

She made her debut as a film costume designer with the film C.I.D. in 1956, and followed it up with other Guru Dutt films such as Pyaasa (1957), Chaudhvin Ka Chand (1960) and Sahib Bibi Aur Ghulam (1962). In her career spanning 50 years she has received numerous awards. She won the Academy Award for Best Costume Design (shared with John Mollo) for her work in the 1982 film, Gandhi and became the first Indian to win an Academy Award. She also won two National Film Awards, in 1991 and 2002.

In a career spanning over 100 films, she worked with Indian filmmakers such as Guru Dutt, Yash Chopra, B.R. Chopra, Raj Kapoor, Vijay Anand, Raj Khosla, and Ashutosh Gowariker, and international directors such Conrad Rooks and Richard Attenborough.

In March 2010, Athaiya released her book The Art of Costume Design, published by HarperCollins. On 13 January 2013, Athaiya presented a copy of the book to the Dalai Lama.

On 23 February 2012, it was reported that Athaiya wished to return her Academy Award to the Academy of Motion Picture Arts and Sciences because she felt that her family will not be able to take care of the trophy after her demise. On 15 December 2012, it was confirmed that the trophy had been returned to The Academy.

In April 2021, as part of the New York Times "Overlooked" series of obituaries that were not written at the time of the person's death (in this case, October 2020), Anita Gates wrote an obituary of Athaiya. In it, Athaiya is quoted about her work on Gandhi: "Richard Attenborough was making a complex film and needed someone who knew India inside out," Athaiya told Eastern Eye, a British weekly newspaper, in an interview published last year. "So much had to be contributed, and I was ready for it."

An exhibition titled "People of Mumbai", at the Chhatrapati Shivaji Maharaj Vastu Sangrahalaya (CSMV), Mumbai, showcases Bhanu Athaiya’s contributions to Modern Art and Indian cinema through a display of both her art and costume designs. Among the exhibits is the famous orange saree-dress worn by actress Mumtaz in Brahmachari (1968), a look that became emblematic of 1960s Bollywood style. The display included a rare work on Canvas from her Progressive Artists' Group days, loaned by Prinseps.

== Personal life ==
Bhanu married a lyricist and poet, Satyendra Athaiya, in the 1950s. Subsequently in 1959, she changed her name from Bhanumati to Bhanu Athaiya. Satyendra died in 2004.

In 2012, Bhanu was diagnosed with a brain tumour, which eventually lead to her suffering paralysis on one side of the body and was bed-ridden for the last three years of her life. She died on October 15, 2020, in Mumbai at the age of 91, at a medical centre in South Mumbai. She is survived by her daughter Radhika Gupta.

== Awards and nominations ==
Year	Award	Film/Artwork	Result	Ref.
1951	Usha Deshmukh Gold Medal - JJ School of Art	Lady In Repose	Won	
1983 (55th)	Academy Award for Best Costume Design	Gandhi	Won	
1983 (36th)	BAFTA Award for Best Costume Design	Gandhi	Nominated	
1991 (38th)	National Film Award for Best Costume Design	Lekin...	Won	
2002 (49th)	National Film Award for Best Costume Design	Lagaan	Won	
2009 (54th)	Filmfare Lifetime Achievement Award		Won	
2013 (4th)	Laadli Lifetime Achievement Award		Won	

== Filmography ==
Year	Title
2015	Nagrik
2008	Phir Kabhi
2004	Swades
2001	Lagaan: Once Upon a Time in India
2001	Dhyaas Parva
2000	Dr. Babasaheb Ambedkar
1995	Prem
1995	The Cloud Door (Himmelspforte, Die)
1995	Oh Darling! Yeh Hai India
1993	1942: A Love Story
1993	Sahibaan
1993	Parampara
1991	Henna
1991	Ajooba
1990	Lekin...
1990	Agneepath
1989	Chandni
1988	Hero Hiralal
1987	Kaash
1986	Sultanat
1985	Ram Teri Ganga Maili
1985	Faasle
1985	Salma
1985	Yaadon Ki Kasam
1984	Tarang
1983	Razia Sultan
1983	Pukar
1982	Gandhi
1982	Prem Rog
1982	Nikaah
1981	Biwi-O-Biwi: The Fun-Film
1981	Hotel
1981	Rocky
1980	Insaaf Ka Tarazu
1980	Agreement
1980	The Burning Train
1980	Karz
1980	Abdullah
1979	Meera
1979	Mr. Natwarlal
1979	Suhaag
1979	Jaani Dushman
1978	Satyam Shivam Sundaram: Love Sublime
1978	Karmayogi
1978	Shalimar
1978	Ghar
1978	Ganga Ki Saugandh
1977	Alaap
1977	Aaina
1977	Ab Kya Hoga
1976	Udhar Ka Sindur
1976	Hera Pheri
1976	Mehbooba
1976	Nagin
1976	Aaj Ka Mahaatma
1976	Chalte Chalte
1976	Do Anjaane
1975	Aakraman
1975	Kala Sona
1975	Dharam Karam
1975	Prem Kahani
1974	Chor Machaye Shor
1974	Bidaai
1973	Dhund
1973	Aaj Ki Taaza Khabar
1973	Keemat
1973	Anamika
1973	Bandhe Haath
1972	Siddhartha
1972	Dastaan
1972	Raaste Kaa Patthar
1972	Roop Tera Mastana
1972	Apna Desh
1972	Mere Jeevan Saathi
1971	Tere Mere Sapne
1971	Pyar Ki Kahani
1971	Aap Aye Bahaar Ayee
1971	Maryada
1970	Johny Mera Naam
1970	Himmat
1970	Khilona
1970	Mera Naam Joker
1970	Maa Aur Mamta
1969	Jeene Ki Raah
1969	Intaquam
1968	Brahmachari
1967	Anita
1967	Patthar Ke Sanam
1967	Hare Kanch Ki Chooriyan
1966	Amrapali
1966	Baharen Phir Bhi Aayengi
1966	Mera Saaya
1966	Teesri Manzil
1966	Budtameez
1965	Guide
1965	Janwar
1965	Kaajal
1965	Waqt
1965	Mere Sanam
1964	Dulha Dulhan
1964	Leader
1962	Sahib Bibi Aur Ghulam
1961	Ganga Jamuna
1961	Jab Pyar Kisi Se Hota Hai
1960	Chaudhvin Ka Chand
1959	Dil Deke Dekho
1959	Kaagaz Ke Phool
1959	Kavi Kalidas
1957	Pyaasa
1956	C.I.D.

== See also ==
- List of Indian winners and nominees of the Academy Awards
