= Budtameez =

- Directed by: Manmohan Desai
- Written by: Jwala Mukhi
- Produced by: Jagdish Varma
- Starring: Shammi Kapoor; Sadhana
- Cinematography: Mohan Keshwani
- Edited by: Harish Pathare
- Music by: Shankar-Jaikishan
- Production companies: Varma Brothers; Filmistan
- Distributed by: Varma Brothers; Filmistan
- Release date: 1966
- Country: India
- Language: Hindi

Budtameez (English: Insolent) is a 1966 Bollywood film produced by Jagdish Varma and directed by Manmohan Desai. It stars Shammi Kapoor, Sadhana in lead roles, along with Brahm Bhardwaj, Laxmi Chhaya, Jagdish Raj, Kanan Kaushal, Purnima, Sunder, Kamal Mehra in supporting roles. Varma Brothers and Filmistan were the production companies for Budtameez, with Varma Brothers handling the Indian distribution and Filmistan controlling the release for in the rest of the world.

Budtameez’s distinctiveness arises from the star buzz provided by its leading cast members Sadhana and Shammi Kapoor, individually, and as a pair. In the five years (1961 to 1965) preceding the release of Budtameez, Sadhana had on average at least one annual hit film which was on the list of the ten highest-grossing films for the year. Specifically, she was the lead female cast member in the hit films Mere Mehboob (1963), Woh Kaun Thi? (1964), Rajkumar (1964), Arzoo (1965) and Waqt (1965).

According to Upperstall, an online reference website, “If Sadhana was the definitive enduring female icon of the swinging 1960s, then without a doubt her male counterpart was Shammi Kapoor. Certainly no other Hindi film hero made the art of boy chasing girl a more enjoyable and playful affair than Shammi Kapoor.” Like Sadhana, in the five years preceding the release of Budtameez, Shammi Kapoor too had on average at least one annual hit film which was on the list of the ten highest-grossing films for the year. In particular, he played the male lead in the hit films Junglee (1961), Dil Tera Deewana (1962), Professor (1962), China Town (1962), Kashmir Ki Kali (1964), Rajkumar and Jaanwar (1965).

Finally, two years before acting in Budtameez, Shammi Kapoor and Sadhana acted as a pair for the first time in the hit film Rajkumar, which was the fifth highest-grossing film of 1964, attesting to their audience appeal as a pair.

== Plot ==
The plot in Budtameez is very loosely based on The Taming of the Shrew in which an impetuous and obstinate shrew is "tamed" into getting into a relationship by a suitor using various psychological torments to change her into a submissive and docile partner.

In Budtameez's retelling of this tale, the plot begins with Shyam Kumar, who plays the suitor in this film. Shyam lives in Allahabad with his stepmother and step-sister Beena. Apparently, Beena had met with an accident because of Shyam and requires the use of a wheelchair. As Shyam's stepmother keeps on niggling him to get a job, Shyam goes to Bombay in search of one and gets a job running the household of the wealthy Raja Bahadur Murti Sagar.

The story picks up with the introduction of Shanta, the "shrew" of the movie, who is Rajabahadur's orphaned granddaughter. Shanta has grown up hating men because her father was an alcoholic who abused her mother until she committed suicide. Understandably, Shanta has turned into an impetuous and ill-mannered person, particularly so to servants like Gopal, who works for the household.

Earlier Rajabahadur had bought in Rita into the household to get Shanta to mend her ways, but Rita's efforts have been unsuccessful. To make matters worse, Shanta's ego is relentlessly fueled by Devdas, who clearly wants to marry her. As part of his efforts to draw Shanta's attention, he persistently engages in weird behaviors, such as dressing up as characters like Robin Hood, and even a donkey. Fed up with his lack of success, Rajabahadur entrusts the task of reforming Shanta to Shyam.

Much of the remaining movie deals with Shyam's repeated attempts to tame Shanta. Things begin to change when Shyam and Shanta take a road trip. The introduction of retired Col. Jung Bahadur during the trip provides a defining moment that helps change Shanta's behavior. Slowly, but surely, Shanta and Shyam fall in love, much to the delight of Rajabahadur, who starts making arrangements for their marriage. Shyam returns to Allahabad to inform his stepmother and stepsister about the upcoming marriage.

The plot subsequently takes an unexpected twist. Rajabahadur receives an invitation for Shyam and Kamla's wedding. The question remains who is Kamla and why is Shyam rejecting Shanta and marrying her? What will happen to Shanta? The plot unfolds with the resolution of the complications that have developed because of this watershed event in the story.

== Cast ==
- Shammi Kapoor as Shyam Kumar
- Sadhana as Shanta
- Purnima as Rita
- Kanan Kaushal as Beena
- Manorama as Shyam's Stepmother
- Laxmi Chhaya as Shanta's Friend
- Jagdish Raj as Colonel Jung Bahadur
- Sunder as Gopal
- Kamal Mehra as Devdas
- Brahm Bhardwaj as Raja Bahadur Murti Sagar

== Soundtrack ==
The music of the film was composed by the duo Shankar–Jaikishan and the songs were penned by lyricists Hasrat Jaipuri and Shailendra.

Song	Singer
"Apni Bahon Se Koi"	Mohammed Rafi
"Budtameez Kaho Ya"	Mohammed Rafi
"Dil Ko Na Mere Tadpao"	Mohammed Rafi
"Haseen Ho Tum"	Mohammed Rafi
"Sirf Tum Hi To Ho Jis Pe Marte Hai Hum"	Mohammed Rafi, Asha Bhosle
"Surat Haseen Hai"	Lata Mangeshkar
"Pehla Pehla Pyar"	Suman Kalyanpur
