= Jhumka Gira Re =

Song by Asha Bhosle
- Released: 1966
- Recorded: Mumbai, 1966
- Genre: Film score, Filmi, Indian rock, Psychedelic rock, Raga rock
- Length: 4:54
- Label: Saregama India Ltd.
- Composer: Madan Mohan
- Lyricist: Raja Mehdi Ali Khan

"Jhumka Gira Re" (transl. Earring Has Fallen) is an Indian Hindi song from the 1966 Hindi film Mera Saaya directed by Raj Khosla. It was sung by Asha Bhosle. The song was picturized on Sadhana Shivdasani. It was written by Raja Mehdi Ali Khan and composed by Madan Mohan. It has been remixed and sampled by many other artists.

The song was a hit in the 1960s, and gained cult status in Hindi cinema.

== Composition ==
The song was sung by Asha Bhosle and composed by Madan Mohan. Although all of the songs were picturized on Sadhana Shivdasani, the songs were split among two twin sisters, one was a naive housewife and another one was a robbery-gang's member. Lata Mangeshkar sang all the songs made for naive sister while Asha Bhosle sang two songs for the evil sister.

The song had a verse, "Phir Kya Hua?" The verse was sung by commentator Vinod Sharma. He was a close friend of Madan Mohan, composer of this song. It remained a mystery till 2021. Even the singer, Asha Bhosle wasn’t aware of the fact who lent the voice for this line. She called composer Madan Mohan's son Sanjeev Kohli to enquire about this.

== Charts and reviews ==
The song secured 4th position at the Binaca Geetmala annual list 1966. It was both Asha Bhosle and Madan Mohan's highest charted song that year.

== Cultural impact ==
The song became such a big hit that the name of the city Bareilly has been synonymous with the song. In February 2020, the song became a national talk of the country once again when the city's authority built a statue of 14 feet tall, golden Jhumka (earring). Some newspapers including India Times compared it with the Sadhana-starrer song.

== Versions ==
This song has been remade and re-sung by many artists including Anupama Deshpande, Hard Kaur. Singer Asha Bhosle herself remixed the song in late 1990s, which featured Riya Sen in the music video.

In 2018, British playback singer and rapper Hard Kaur made a remake version of it.

== Adaptation ==
In 2023, Pritam composed the song titled "What Jhumka?" for the film Rocky Aur Rani Kii Prem Kahaani directed by Karan Johar, starring Ranveer Singh and Alia Bhatt, adapted from this song was released on 12 July. The song was featured Singh and Bhatt, sung by Arijit Singh, Jonita Gandhi, Ranveer and the lyrics were written by Amitabh Bhattacharya.
