= Lag Jaa Gale =

Song by Lata Mangeshkar

from the album Woh Kaun Thi?
- Language: Hindi
- Released: 1964
- Composer: Madan Mohan
- Lyricist: Raja Mehdi Ali Khan
- Producer: Saregama

"Lag Jaa Gale" (transl. Embrace me) is a Hindi song with music by Madan Mohan Kohli and lyrics by Raja Mehdi Ali Khan, written for the 1964 Hindi film Woh Kaun Thi? under the music label Saregama. On screen, the song was picturised on film stars Sadhana and Manoj Kumar, though it was actually sung by playback singer Lata Mangeshkar.

== In Indian musical tradition ==
The music is set in Raga Pahari. The song is an example of Dadra songs.

== "Lag Jaa Gale" since 1964 ==
Lata Mangeshkar's career spanned more than 70 years (starting in 1942), recording thousands of songs. This iconic song is regarded to be one of the songs by which Lata Mangeshkar is remembered. Lata herself considered this song to be among her top six favourite songs in 2016 and among her favourite 20 in 2012.

In 2014, on the fiftieth anniversary of the song, she tweeted: "Namaskar Is varsh 'Lag ja gale ke phir ye haseen raat' is geet ko 50 saal pure ho rahe hain. aisa madhur geet aaj bhi purana nahi lagta" ("This year the song 'Lag ja gale ke phir ye hasee'n raat' is 50 years old, but it is so sweet, it does not feel old at all")

== Lyrics ==
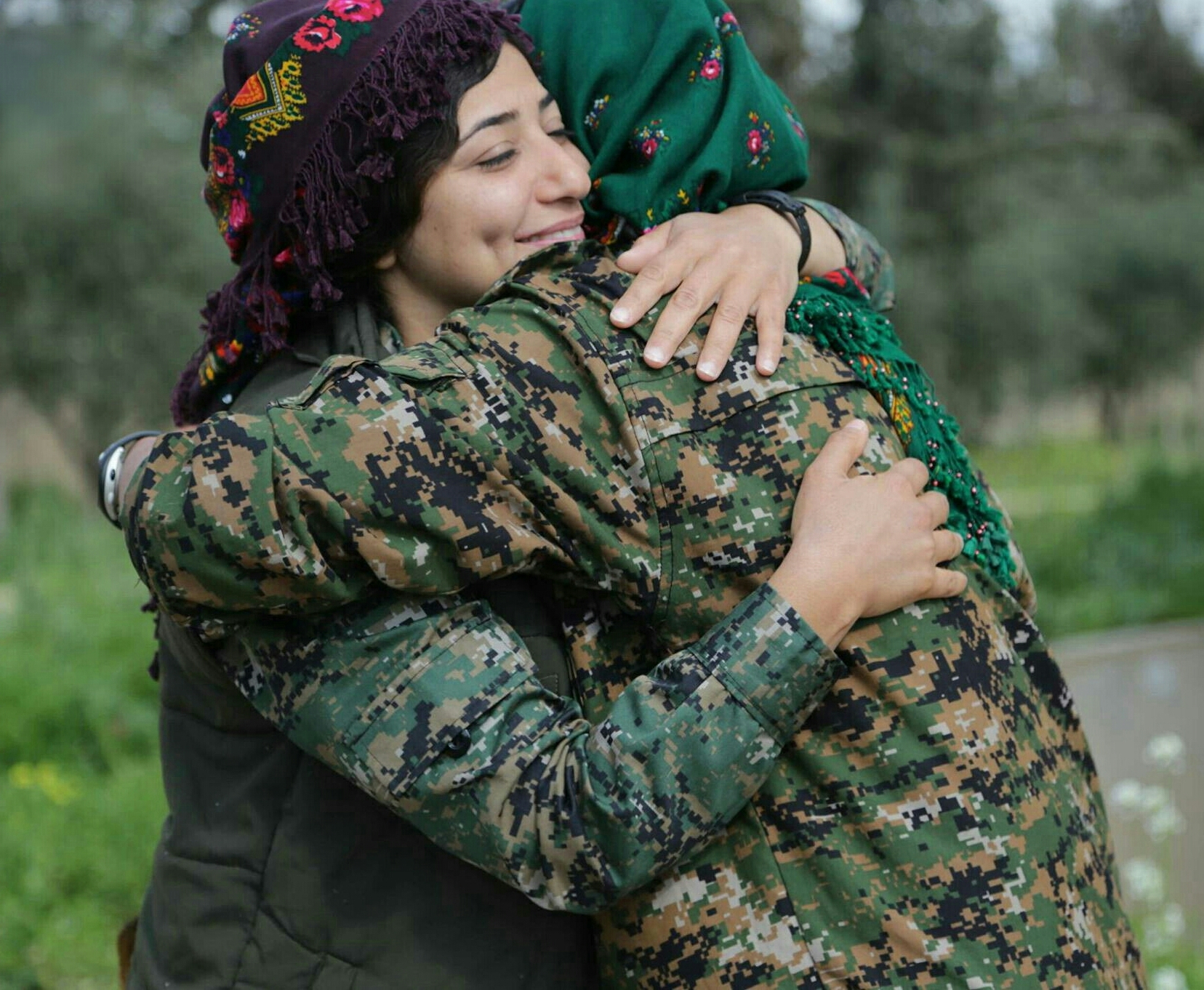
Gale lagana – Kurdish women

In the song, the singer expresses that this evening may the last time she will see her beloved.

== In popular culture ==
It is said that during the Film's production of Woh Kaun Thi, the song was originally rejected by the film director Raj Khosla. However, he eventually included the song after actor Manoj Kumar who also starred in the film admired the composition and persuaded Khosla to retain it.

When the former star Sadhana died in 2015, she was often recalled by referring to her as the actress of this song.

The actor Irrfan Khan, who died on 29 April 2020 after a battle with cancer, used to listen to this song during his last days.

== Renditions ==
In 1966, two films used the song: in the Tamil film Yaar Nee?, it is rendered as "Ponmeni Thazhuvamal", and in the Telugu film Aame Evaru? it is rendered as "Andala Ee Reyi".

In 1968, Shipra Bose rendered a Bengali version of the same song, "Sangi Je Ke E Mann Ke Amar Aaj Dolalo". The song was penned in Bengali by Miltu Ghosh.

The singer Shreya Ghoshal performed the song in concert several times in the 2010s.

The film Kedarnath features a rendition by the singer Sanam Puri.

A rendition of the song sung by Jonita Gandhi featured in 2018 film Saheb, Biwi Aur Gangster 3.

== Legacy ==
The song was widely remembered after Lata's death. Bollywood actor Salman Khan tearfully sang the a few lines of the song and shared it with social media. About 40 young Pakistani musicians recorded their rendering as a tribute. Malayalam composer Kailas Menon said that ‘Lag Ja Gale’ is one of the best recordings in Indian cinema. Pakistan's Geo News mentioning Sufi singer Abida Parveen's tribute called Lata "The Lag Jaa Gale singer". Israel's Liora Itzhak in her tribute recalled "Lag jaa gale" as the first song she remembered. The song was also recalled by Pakistani actor Mahira Khan.
