= Bela Bose =

Indian dancer and actress

- Born: April 18, 1941; Calcutta, Bengal Presidency, British India
- Died: February 20, 2023 (aged 81)
- Occupations: Actress, dancer
- Spouse: Ashish Kumar (m. 1967)
- Children: 2

Bela Bose (18 April 1941 – 20 February 2023) was an Indian dancer and actress who was active in Hindi films during the 1960s and 1970s.

== Early life ==
Bela Bose was born in Calcutta on 18 April 1941 into a well-to-do family. Her father was a cloth merchant, and her mother was a homemaker. Following a bank crash that wiped out their fortune, the family relocated to Bombay in 1951. As a schoolgirl, she started her career as a group dancer in films to help support her family after her father's death in a road accident. She appeared in more films after finishing her schooling.

== Career ==
Bela Bose began to receive independent credit from the late 1950s. Her big break came when she was asked to perform a dance number with Raj Kapoor in Main Nashe Mein Hoon, released in 1959. Her first leading role was at age 21 in Sautela Bhai (1962) opposite Guru Dutt. She honed her acting skills performing in Bengali plays. Her career consisted of more than 150 films. In Hawa Mahal (1962), she played the role of Helen's sister. She was often called upon to play the role of a vamp. Conservative in real life, she lost some roles because of her refusal to wear a swimming suit onscreen.

Bose performed in such films as Bimal Roy's Bandini (1963), F.C. Mehra's Professor (1962) and Amrapali, Atmaram's Shikar, Umang,Yeh Gulistan Hamara, Dil Aur Mohabbat, Zindagi Aur Maut, and Wahan Ke Log. She later became a character actress and played the villainous sister-in-law in Jai Santoshi Maa.

Her husband, Ashish Kumar, was an actor. They married in 1967 and she gradually eased out of acting after giving birth to a daughter and a son.

== Death ==
Bose died on 20 February 2023, at the age of 81.

== Selected filmography ==
- Main Nashe Mein Hoon (1959)
- Chirag Kahan Roshni Kahan (1959)
- Ek Phool Char Kaante (1960)
- Chaudhary Karnail Singh (1960) Punjabi Movie
- Chhote Nawab (1961)
- Opera House (1961)
- Professor (1962)
- Sautela Bhai (1962)
- Hawa Mahal (1962)
- Prem Patra (1962)
- Anpadh (1962)
- Bandini (1963)
- "Bidesiya (1963) (Bhojpuri Film)
- Ziddi (1964)
- Chitralekha (1964)
- Mama Ji (1964) Punjabi Movie
- Hum Sab Ustad Hain (1965)
- Poonam Ki Raat (1965)
- Tarzan comes to Delhi (1965)
- Boxer (1965)
- Neend Hamari Khwab Tumhare (1966)
- Dil Ne Phir Yaad Kiya (1966)
- CID 909 (1967) as Rosy
- Baharon Ke Sapne (1967)
- Anita (1967)
- Shikar (1968)
- Fareb (1968)
- Jab Yaad Kisi Ki Aati Hai (1969)
- Jeene Ki Raah (1969)
- Abhinetri (1970)
- Bhai Ho To Aisa (1972)
- Dil Daulat Duniya (1972)
- Jai Santoshi Maa (1975)
- Bombay by Nite (1979)
- Sau Din Saas Ke (1980)
