= Parakh (1960 film) =

1960 Indian Hindi film by Bimal Roy

- Directed by: Bimal Roy
- Written by: Salil Choudhury; Shailendra (dialogue)
- Produced by: Bimal Roy
- Starring: Sadhana; Motilal; Nazir Hussain; Durga Khote
- Cinematography: Kamal Bose
- Edited by: Amit Bose
- Music by: Salil Choudhury
- Release date: 5 August 1960
- Country: India
- Language: Hindi
- Box office: ₹1,00,00,000

Parakh is a 1960 Indian Hindi film, based on a story by music director Salil Chowdhury, that displays Bimal Roy's lighter side and is a satirical look at Indian democracy in its early years. Bimal Roy received the Filmfare Best Director Award for the film. The ensemble cast was led by Sadhana and Basanta Choudhury. The film has music by Salil Choudhury, featuring Lata Mangeshkar's hit "O Sajana Barkha Bahaar Aai".

The film was successful at the box office.

== Plot ==
The central character is the Post Master Nivaran who is given a mysterious cheque for ₹500,000 to be given to anyone who will use it to benefit the people of the village. There is a postman Haradhan who is actually Sir Jagdish Chandra who pretends to be lame and has secretly come to the village to know the right person to hand over the cheque, so he visits most of the possible candidates for verification of their honesty. Then there is the postmaster's wife, who is sick and would rather use the money to cure her illness, and his beautiful daughter Seema, who has a crush on the village schoolmaster Rajat. Meanwhile, all the greedy and influential people of the village are busy trying to convince everybody why they are most deserving of the money; they include the village Pandit, the landlord Rai bahadur tandav, the money lender Bhanjhi Babu, the village doctor, Vaidji and the school master Rajat who withdraws his name, who is by far the most respected. Each one tries to woo the villagers by being sympathetic and become a cheerful giver to all by offering various sops. They all decide democracy is the best means and decide to hold an election where the winner gets the money. One day the landlord's westernised sister in law Chanda arrives to the village, who is given lift by Rajat on his cycle from the railway station, thereafter she tries to get friendly to Rajat with some excuse or the other. Seema gets upset over this scenario and quarrels with him. The movie is a satirical look at democracy through various twists and turns in the plot, interwoven with a simple love story.

== Cast ==
- Sadhana as Seema
- Durga Khote as J.C. Roy's mother (Rani Ma)
- Leela Chitnis as Mrs. Nivaran
- Praveen Paul
- Mumtaz Begum as Mrs. Tandav
- Mehar Banu
- Basanta Choudhury as Prof. Rajat Sen Sharma
- Nazir Hussain as Postmaster Nivaran
- Kanhaiyalal as Pandit Tarkalankarji
- Jayant as Rai Bahadur Tandav Landlord
- Rashid Khan as Village Doctor
- Asit Sen as Bhanju Babu
- Motilal as Haradhan / Sir Jagdish Chandra Roy
- Hari Shivdasani as School's Principal
- Moni Chatterjee as Kaviraj (Vaidji)
- Keshto Mukherjee as Keshto (The Compounder)
- Nishi as Chanda (Tandav's sister in law)

== Music ==
This film has a very popular song "O Sajana, Barkha Bahar Aai..." sung by Lata Mangeshkar, penned by Shailendra and composed by Salil Chowdhary who also happens to be story-writer of the film.

No.	Title	Singer(s)	Length
1.	"O Sajana, Barkha Bahar Aai" (Raga Khamaj)	Lata Mangeshkar
2.	"Mila Hai Kisi Ka Jhumka"	Lata Mangeshkar
3.	"Yeh Bansi Kyon Gaaye"	Lata Mangeshkar
4.	"Mere Maan Ke Diye"	Lata Mangeshkar
5.	"Kya Hawa Chali Babu Rut Badli"	Manna Dey

== Production ==
Actress Nishi parodied Madhubala in the film.

== Awards and nominations ==
Parakh is one of the seven Bimal Roy's film where he won Filmfare Awards for Best Direction.

Won

- Filmfare Best Director Award - Bimal Roy
- Filmfare Best Supporting Actor Award - Motilal
- Filmfare Best Sound Award - George D'Cruz

Nominated

- Filmfare Award for Best Film
- Filmfare Award for Best Story - Salil Choudhury
