= Dr. Vidya =

- Directed by: Rajendra Bhatia
- Written by: Screenplay: Sachin Bhowmik; Dialogue: Sarishar Sailani
- Produced by: Mohan Segal
- Starring: Vyjayanthimala; Manoj Kumar; Leela Chitnis; Nazir Hussain
- Cinematography: C. S. Puttu
- Edited by: Pratap Dave
- Music by: S. D. Burman
- Production company: Mohan Studio
- Distributed by: Deluxe Films
- Release date: 1962
- Country: India
- Language: Hindi
- Box office: ₹ 80,00,000

Dr. Vidya is a 1962 Hindi Black-and-white Romantic family film written by Mohan Segal and directed by Rajendra Bhatia. The film stars Vyjayanthimala in the title role and Manoj Kumar in the lead, with Leela Chitnis, Nazir Hussain, Helen, Sunder, Madan Puri, Prem Chopra and Mumtaz Begum, forming an ensemble cast. The film was produced by Mohan Segal under his own banner, Deluxe Films. The film's score was composed by S. D. Burman, with lyrics provided by Majrooh Sultanpuri and Raja Mehdi Ali Khan. While the editing was done by Pratap Dave. This story was adapted from the Marathi film Shikleli Bayko (1959) (Meaning " Educated Wife").

== Plot ==
The movie was shot in an era when educated people in cities were getting influenced by the western culture, hence the people from rural areas who placed a lot of importance on values and culture, strongly abstained from marrying into city people's homes. Geeta (Vyjanthimala) is a girl from a well-to-do family and is well educated, her parents had brought up her with traditional values and respect for those values. After her graduation, her parents decide to marry her off to Ratan Chowdhury, (Manoj Kumar) the son of a zamindar, who had the mind frame that a highly educated wife would be incapable of handling and managing a home, especially in a joint family. Later, he marries Geeta, but his mentality and the talk of others stop him from accepting her. He disowns her and poor Geeta has to go back to her parents' house. Her father-in-law (Nazir Hussain) also does in a state of shock after leaving Geeta at her father's (Shivraj) place

Even after a lot of insistence from her parents and friends, she refuses to remarry. Instead, she continues her studies to become a doctor. After garnering a degree in medical science, she goes back to Ratan's village as Dr Vidya as none of the villagers had seen her during the marriage ceremony. She stays at the same house as Ratan on a rental basis, As he has shifted to another house. Geeta wants to clear the wrong perceptions that Ratan has about her. Ratan couldn't recognise her, as he had not even seen her face, even during marriage. He falls in love with Vidya and intends to marry her, but one day during the annual cart race, Ratan meets with an accident and suffers a very bad injury, after which needs surgery. Due to the unavailability of any other doctor, Geeta has to do the job. She performs it successfully. Will Ratan accept Geeta in her new avatar?

== Cast ==
- Vyjayanthimala as Geetha / Dr. Vidya
- Manoj Kumar as Ratan Chowdhury
- Leela Chitnis
- Nazir Hussain
- Helen
- Sunder
- Madan Puri
- Prem Chopra
- Mumtaz Begum

== Soundtrack ==
Dr. Vidya

Soundtrack album by Sachin Dev Burman
- Released: 1962 (India)
- Genre: Film soundtrack
- Label: Saregama
- Producer: Sachin Dev Burman

Sachin Dev Burman chronology
Baat Ek Raat Ki (1962)	Dr. Vidya (1962)	Tere Ghar Ke Samne (1963)

The film's soundtrack was composed by S. D. Burman with lyrics provided by Majrooh Sultanpuri and Raja Mehdi Ali Khan.

No.	Song	Singers	Picturization	Length (m:ss)	Lyrics	Notes
1	"Aayi Hai Dilruba Are Tujh Ko Kya "	Asha Bhosle, Geeta Dutt	Featuring actress Vyjayanthimala and Helen in a dance competition	8:20	Raja Mehdi Ali Khan	
2	"Aye Dil-E-Awaara Chal Phir Wahin Dobaara"	Mukesh	Featuring Manoj Kumar	3:14	Majrooh Sultanpuri	
3	"Bheegi Bheegi Aankhon Pe Parda"	Lata Mangeshkar	Featuring Vyjayanthimala and Manoj Kumar	8:20	Raja Mehdi Ali Khan	
4	"Jaani Tum To Dole Daga Deke"	Lata Mangeshkar	Duet on actress Vyjayanthimala and Manoj Kumar	3:49	Majrooh Sultanpuri	
5	"Khanke Kangna Bindiya Hanse"	Lata Mangeshkar	Picturization on Vyjayanthimala	3:16	Majrooh Sultanpuri	
6	"Main Kal Phir Miloongi"	Mohammed Rafi, Lata Mangeshkar	Duet featuring the lead pair	3:34	Raja Mehdi Ali Khan	
7	"Pawan Diwani Na Maane"	Lata Mangeshkar	Featuring Vyjayanthimala performing Indian classical dance	3:19	Majrooh Sultanpuri	
8	"Yoon Hans Hans Ke Na Dekho"	Mohammed Rafi, Asha Bhosle	Featuring Prem Chopra and Helen	3:47	Raja Mehdi Ali Khan	

== Box office ==
At the end of its theatrical run, the film grossed around ₹ 80,00,000, thus becoming the eighteenth highest-grossing film of 1962.
