= Asli-Naqli =

1962 film

- Directed by: Hrishikesh Mukherjee
- Written by: Inder Raj Anand
- Produced by: L B Lachman; L B Thakur
- Starring: Dev Anand; Sadhana; Nazir Hussain
- Cinematography: Jaywant Pathare
- Edited by: Das Dhaimade
- Music by: Shankar Jaikishan
- Release date: November 27, 1962
- Country: India
- Language: Hindi

Asli-Naqli (transl. Real and Fake) is a 1962 Hindi film produced by L.B Lachman and L.B Thakur. The film is directed by Hrishikesh Mukherjee and stars Dev Anand, Sadhana, Leela Chitnis, Anwar Hussain, Sandhya Roy and Keshto Mukherjee. The film's music is by Shankar Jaikishan and the lyrics by Hasrat Jaipuri and Shailendra. The film became a box office hit.

== Plot ==
Anand (Dev Anand) grandson of rich businessman Rai Bahadur (Nazir Hussain) is invited to marry Rekha, the only daughter of a rich man. Anand, however, is not enamoured. In the ensuing disagreement, Anand leaves home to prove his worth. He finds himself in a poor neighborhood in Mumbai after meeting Mohan (Anwar Hussain).

Anand settles in and tries to find work. He meets a beautiful young woman Renu (Sadhana Shivdasani) and is enchanted. She helps him to find a job but he soon loses it through his incompetence. Renu works at a small company but hides the fact from her mother (Leela Chitnis) because she believes that her mother could not bear the truth that her father is dead. She tells her that he sends the money she earns. Anand falls entirely in love and proposes to her delight.

Rai Bahadur however finds Anand, and insists that he marry Rekha. When he receives Anand's reply he sets off to blackmail Renu - that he would tell her mother about her father's death if she does not reject Anand. She agrees and tells Anand to forget her. Renu's mother overhears this conversation and intervenes. She advises Renu to marry her own hearts desire. Renu and Anand marry with Rai Bahadur's blessings, a happy ending to a beautifully directed film.

== Cast ==
- Dev Anand as Prince Anand
- Sadhana Shivdasani as Renu
- Leela Chitnis as Renu's mother
- Nazir Hussain as Dwarkadas
- Anwar Hussain as Mohan
- Sandhya Roy as Shanti
- Indira Billi as Rekha
- Mukri as Nandu
- Keshto Mukherjee as Mr Gomes
- Motilal as Colonel Mishra
- Amol Sen as Ramu
- Mehar Banu as Meenu
- Shobha Sen
- Polson as school bus conductor

== Trivia ==
Hrishikesh Mukherjee as a director comes to maturity in this film and develops a signature style of healthy family entertainment. This film follows one of his earlier successes, Anari.

Innovative Song Picturisation: In the expression of love, while filming the song "Ek But Banaunga", Hrishikesh Mukherjee took care that Dev Anand and Sadhana maintained a distance of at least 20 feet between them. At one time when they come nearer, there is a blackboard on a stand between them. When Dev Anand turns around the blackboard to Sadhana's side, the latter puts a slate between them. In the backdrop of rains outside, with Mohammed Rafi's magic all around, someone takes away a goat from the rain-sheltered veranda and one is transported to the dream world of love. At times Dev Anand is outside in the veranda with the bamboo mesh of a window between them. Dev is worshipping Sadhana with folded hands and in the end Sadhana comes near with her hands raised in blessing.

Similarly, while picturising the song "Tera Mera Pyaar Amar", Hrishikesh Mukherjee demonstrates the love between Dev Anand and Sadhana by putting them in different places as the song unfolds. In the early part of his career, Hrishikesh Mukherjee was a cinematographer and all through the film, there is brilliant camera work.

The song "Tujhe jeevan ki dori se" is also used in the movie Guddi in a dream sequence song featuring Dharmendra.

Highlights: There is a scene in which Nazir Hussain praises the workmanship of an artifact to Dev Anand when the latter is disturbed. The same scene would be repeated by Hrishikesh Mukherjee in the film Namak Haram (1973), between Om Shivpuri and Amitabh Bachchan.

In a single scene, Motilal, the character actor gives a brilliant performance by advising Dev Anand to let things go, rather than to control them. He asks Dev Anand in the club to hold sand in his palm and tells him: "If you would try to hold on to the sands, these would escape through your fingers. But if you keep your palm open, they would stay undisturbed."

In the scene when Sadhana is teaching English to the slum dwellers, she asks Dev Anand to spell and pronounce 'No' and gets into a funny argument about English pronunciations. A similar situation is repeated in 1975 film Chupke Chupke between Dharmendra and Om Prakash.

The film is refreshing with brilliant acting by all the cast and is very competently directed by Hrishikesh Mukherjee.

This film's story is partly inspired by The Definite Object, a 1917 romance novel by the British writer Jeffery Farnol.

== Soundtrack ==
#	Title	Singer(s)	Lyricist
1	"Kal Ki Daulat Aaj Ki Khushiyan"	Mohammed Rafi	Shailendra
2	"Lakh Chhupao Chhup Na Sakega"	Lata Mangeshkar	Hasrat Jaipuri
3	"Gori Jara Hans De Tu Hans De"	Mohammed Rafi	Hasrat Jaipuri
4	"Tujhe Jeevan Ki Dor Se"	Mohammed Rafi, Lata Mangeshkar	Hasrat Jaipuri
5	"Tera Mera Pyaar Amar"	Lata Mangeshkar	Shailendra
6	"Chheda Mera Dil Ne Tarana"	Mohammed Rafi	Hasrat Jaipuri
7	"Ek But Banaoonga"	Mohammed Rafi	Hasrat Jaipuri
