= Geetaa Mera Naam =

1974 film by Sadhana Shivdasani

- Film poster
- Directed by: Sadhana
- Written by: Madan Joshi
- Screenplay by: K. A. Narayan
- Story by: K. A. Narayan
- Produced by: Uttam Dev Kant; R. K. Nayyar
- Starring: Sunil Dutt; Feroz Khan; Sadhana; Helen
- Cinematography: Pratap Sinha
- Edited by: Waman Bhosle; Gurudutt Shirali
- Music by: Laxmikant-Pyarelal
- Distributed by: Laxmi Films
- Release date: 24 March 1974
- Country: India
- Language: Hindi

Geeta Mera Naam (transl. Geetaa is my name) is a 1974 Indian Hindi-language produced by R. K. Nayyar. His wife Sadhana starred in a dual role and also directed the film. The film also features Sunil Dutt, Feroz Khan and Helen. The music is by Laxmikant-Pyarelal. The film performed well at the box office.

== Plot ==
The film tells the story of four children who are separated at a fair and unknowingly reunite years later when Geeta (Sadhana) meets Neeta (also Sadhana) in prison. Neeta has been wrongly accused of murder. Geeta is then caught up in a scheme to find the true killer, which leads her to her brother Johny's (Sunil Dutt) gang.

== Cast ==
- Sunil Dutt as Suraj / Johnny
- Feroz Khan as Raja
- Sadhana as Kavita / Neeta / Geeta (Dual Role)
- Helen as Savitri
- Rajendra Nath
- Ramesh Deo as Chandu / Inspector
- Achala Sachdev
- Sanjana
- Purnima as Rani
- Randhir
- Murad
- Jankidas as Johnny Gang Member
- Birbal
- Mahmohan as Johnny Gang Member
- Agha
- Keshto Mukerjee
- Mehmood Jr.

== Soundtrack ==
The soundtrack was composed by Laxmikant-Pyarelal and written by Rajendra Krishan. The song "Mujhe Maar Daalo" with non-lexical vocable of this film was used in the song "People" which features in American rapper J Dilla's album Donuts (2006).

Song	Singer
"Aankhen Do Aankhen"	Lata Mangeshkar
"Suniye Zara Dekhiye Na"	Lata Mangeshkar
"O Meherbaan Dekho Zara"	Lata Mangeshkar
"Mohabbat Hi Mohabbat Hai"	Mohammed Rafi
"Lahu Ko Lahu Pukarega" (Part 1)	Mohammed Rafi
"Lahu Ko Lahu Pukarega" (Part 2)	Mohammed Rafi
"Lahu Ko Lahu Pukarega" (Part 3)	Mohammed Rafi
"Mujhe Maar Daalo"	Asha Bhosle
