= Sadhna Pass =

- Location within Jammu and Kashmir Location within India
- Elevation: 3,000 metres (9,800 ft)

Third Approach
- Location: Jammu and Kashmir, India
- Range: Shams Bari Range
- Coordinates: 34.40°N 73.95°E

Sadhna pass, also known as Sadhna Top and previously called Nastachun (Note: Originally called Nasta Chun, meaning "cut nose", the pass came to be popularly referred to as the Sadhna pass or Sadhna Top after a 1960s visit by Bollywood actress Sadhana Shivdasani.) is a mountain pass in Jammu and Kashmir, India. It is located in the Himalayas and connects Karnah tehsil in the Kishanganga valley of Kupwara district with the Kashmir Valley. It is approximately 48 km away from the town of Kupwara. It is located in the vast Shams Bari mountain range at about 3,130 m (10,269 ft) above sea level. The pass is best known for a mythological legend of Blind and Deaf Fairies, and for its association with Bollywood actress Sadhana.

== Etymology ==
The pass was originally called Nasta Chun, meaning "cut nose", but came to be popularly referred to as the Sadhna pass or Sadhna Top after a 1960s visit by Bollywood actress Sadhana Shivdasani.

== Climate ==
Sadhna Pass is notable for its elevation and challenging weather conditions, particularly during the winter months when heavy snowfall can lead to the pass being closed. Due to its strategic location and scenery, it has gained attention as both a transportation route and a destination for travelers and adventurers.

== Transport ==
Sadhna Pass lies on NH701, and the pass plays a role in connecting various regions in Jammu and Kashmir, while also offering a glimpse of the natural landscapes that characterize this part of India.

== Tunnel ==
Sadhna Pass Tunnel, once completed, will turn the avalanche-prone route, which gets closed during the winter snowfall, into a safer and faster all-weather geostrategic road. The contract for the preparation of DPR for 6 km long tunnel was awarded in March 2026.

== See also ==
- Tunnels in North West India

== Climate ==
Climate data for Sadhna Pass (1981–2023 via satellite based observations)
Month	Jan	Feb	Mar	Apr	May	Jun	Jul	Aug	Sep	Oct	Nov	Dec	Year
Record high °C (°F)	7.4 (45.3)	10.1 (50.2)	13.2 (55.8)	19.8 (67.6)	24.7 (76.5)	29.1 (84.4)	32.2 (90.0)	31.6 (88.9)	28.9 (84.0)	21.5 (70.7)	12.7 (54.9)	9.2 (48.6)	32.2 (90.0)
Mean daily maximum °C (°F)	−2.8 (27.0)	−1.9 (28.6)	3.1 (37.6)	7.1 (44.8)	13.4 (56.1)	18.7 (65.7)	19.8 (67.6)	19.3 (66.7)	18.1 (64.6)	9.5 (49.1)	1.8 (35.2)	−2.1 (28.2)	8.7 (47.6)
Mean daily minimum °C (°F)	−13.4 (7.9)	−12.1 (10.2)	−8.7 (16.3)	−4.3 (24.3)	−1.8 (28.8)	4.1 (39.4)	7.9 (46.2)	7.6 (45.7)	4.7 (40.5)	−5.1 (22.8)	−9.4 (15.1)	−13.1 (8.4)	−3.6 (25.5)
Record low °C (°F)	−32.7 (−26.9)	−30.4 (−22.7)	−21.4 (−6.5)	−13.1 (8.4)	−11.3 (11.7)	−4.8 (23.4)	1.4 (34.5)	−3.9 (25.0)	−5.4 (22.3)	−13.4 (7.9)	−23.1 (−9.6)	−28.2 (−18.8)	−32.7 (−26.9)
Source: India Meteorological Department
