= Aap Ki Parchhaiyan =

1964 film

- Directed by: Mohan Kumar
- Written by: Mohan Kumar, Sarashar Sailani (dialogue)
- Produced by: Mohan Kumar
- Starring: Dharmendra; Shashikala; Om Prakash; Supriya Choudhury
- Cinematography: K. H. Kapadia
- Edited by: Nand Kumar
- Music by: Madan Mohan; Raja Mehdi Ali Khan (lyrics)
- Release date: 1964
- Country: India
- Language: Hindi

Aap Ki Parchhaiyan (English: Your Shadows) is a 1964 Bollywood film. Produced and directed by Mohan Kumar, the film stars Dharmendra, Shashikala, Supriya Choudhury, Om Prakash and Manorama. The film's music is by Madan Mohan. A couple of songs; "Main nigahen tere chehre se hataaoon kaise", by Mohd. Rafi and "Agar mujhse mohabbat hai" by Lata Mangeshkar are plus points of this family drama.

== Cast ==
- Dharmendra as Chandramohan Chopra 'Channi'
- Supriya Choudhury as Asha
- Vijayalaxmi as usha( Rekhas friend)
- Shashikala as Rekha
- Suresh as Baldev Chopra
- Nazir Hussain as Dinanath Chopra
- Leela Chitnis as Mrs. Dinanath Chopra
- Mumtaz Begum a Rekha's Mother
- Om Prakash as Vilayti Ram
- Moppet Rajoo
- Manorama as Mrs. Vilayti Ram
- Brahm Bhardwaj as Rekha's Father
- Amol Sen as dwarf man with news paper
- Kartar Singh (Sikh passenger in train)
- Khairati as Hzari (Om Prakash assistant)
- Madhu Apte as Gulzari with glasses ( Om Parkash assistant)
- Santosh Kapoor
- Sadhu Singh
- Moolchand as Lala Khushiram money lender
- Nazir Kashmiri
- Sayyed
- Harbans Darshan M. Arora as Chaman Lal

== Soundtrack ==
The music of the film was composed by Madan Mohan, and lyrics provided by Raja Mehdi Ali Khan.

Title	Singer(s)
"Agar Mujh Se Mohabbat Hai..."	Lata Mangeshkar
"Jab Tak Ke Hai Aakash Pe Chand Aur Sitare..."	Asha Bhosle
"Yahi Hai Tamanna Tere Dar Ke Samane..."	Mohammed Rafi
"Main Nigahein Tere Chehre Se..."	Mohammed Rafi
"Ek Matwala Aaj Chala Apni Manzil Ko..."	Mohammed Rafi
"Kabhi Ithla Ke Chalte Ho..."	Mohammed Rafi, Asha Bhosle
