= Anita (1967 film) =

- Theatrical poster
- Directed by: Raj Khosla
- Written by: Chandrakant (dialogue); G. R. Kamath (screenplay)
- Produced by: Raj Khosla
- Starring: Manoj Kumar; Sadhana; I. S. Johar; Kishen Mehta; Sajjan
- Cinematography: V. Gopi Krishna
- Edited by: D. N. Pai
- Music by: Laxmikant Pyarelal; Raja Mehdi Ali Khan (lyrics)
- Release date: 1967
- Running time: 154 minutes
- Country: India
- Language: Hindi

Anita is a 1967 Indian suspense film, directed and produced by Raj Khosla, and starring Manoj Kumar and Sadhana. The film is the last of the suspense-thriller trilogy of Khosla-Sadhana partnership. Woh Kaun Thi? (1964) and Mera Saaya (1966) were the two previous films in the series. The movie was a hit at box office. The plot twist of the movie was based on that of the 1958 film Vertigo. Sadhana was praised for her portrayal of Anita despite the film underperforming at the box office.

== Plot ==
Neeraj (Manoj Kumar) and Anita (Sadhna) are deeply in love and want to marry but this is unacceptable to her father Bihari Lal, a millionaire as Neeraj does an ordinary job and Anita is a millionaire. When her father rejects her marriage with Neeraj, Anita visits Neeraj and asks him to marry her in a Civil Marriage. When both reach court, her father arrives and warns her of dire consequences for marrying against his wishes. Shattered, she walks away from Neeraj and returns home with her father. Anita's father wants her to marry Anil Sharma (Kishen Mehta), a business tycoon. When Neeraj tries to talk to her, she asks him to not come back in her life. Soon, Neeraj receives a letter from Anita, which raises suspicions in his mind. He goes to meet her, only to learn that she has committed suicide. Neeraj suspects foul play and decides to find out the truth on his own.

He sees Anita at the same exact place where she supposedly committed suicide. His friend advises Neeraj to go on a vacation and try to forget the incident. During his vacation, at a picnic, Neeraj once again sees Anita as a saffron clad sadhvi (saint), Maya. Neeraj learns that he saw Maya Jogan (also played by Sadhana), who died 20 years ago. He sees her again in a train coach while travelling to Mumbai.

Anita sends a letter to Neeraj asking him to meet at a hotel so that she can disclose the truth. To avoid the police, Anita meets Neeraj at his house. Anita then takes Neeraj to the secret building where Anil reveals that he killed his lover who was pregnant and threw her into the river and made it look like Anita committed suicide. Later the police come chasing Anil and he is killed in an encounter. After that, Neeraj and Anita are reunited and hug each other.

== Cast ==
- Manoj Kumar as Neeraj
- Sadhana as Anita/Maya
- Sajjan as Anita's father
- Ulhas as Maharaj, astrologer
- Kishan Mehta as Anil Sharma
- Chand Usmani as Varsha
- Shah Agha as Varsha's husband
- Dhumal as Razdhan detective
- Mukri as Joseph Baker
- Tun Tun (Uma Devi Khatri) as Mrs. Joseph Baker
- Shivraj as Police Commissioner
- Birbal (Satyendra Khosla) as Roshandan, assistant to Dhumal
- I. S. Johar as painter
- Bela Bose as dancer in La Bella
- Madhumati as blonde dancer in La Bella
- Meena T as typist in Razdhan's office
- Kedarnath Saigal as Peter

== Music ==
Composed by the musical duo Laxmikant Pyarelal, the songs of the film are penned by Raja Mehdi Ali Khan, Anand Bakshi and Arzoo Lucknavi. The music album also has two instrumentals, the title music track and the suspense theme track.

No.	Title	Lyrics	Singer(s)	Length
1.	"Gore Gore Chand Se Mukh Pe"	Arzoo Lucknavi	Mukesh	5:15
2.	"Hai Nazar Ka Ishara"	Anand Bakshi	Lata Mangeshkar, Usha Mangeshkar	5:26
3.	"Kareeb Aa Ye Nazar"	Raja Mehdi Ali Khan	Lata Mangeshkar	4:19
4.	"Pichhwade Buddha Khansta"	Raja Mehdi Ali Khan	Lata Mangeshkar	5:04
5.	"Samne Mere Sanwariya"	Raja Mehdi Ali Khan	Lata Mangeshkar	4:39
6.	"Tum Bin Jeevan Kaise Beeta" (Raga Kalyan)	Raja Mehdi Ali Khan	Mukesh	4:19
7.	"Anita (Title Music)"	-	Instrumental	1:55
8.	"Theme Music"	-	Instrumental	3:58

== Filming ==
This is one of first Hindi films where a full song "Gore Gore Chand Se Mukh Par" is played before the opening credits.

Some of the scenes in the film were shot in Nainital. The ashram and temple is Hanuman Garhi in Nainital, where the song "Tum Bin Jeevan Kaise Beeta" was shot. The final scene was shot at Mumbai's Vihar Lake area where the popular Humpty Dumpty structures can be seen.
