= Aap Aye Bahaar Ayee =

Aap Aye Bahar Ayee
- Poster
- Directed by: Mohan Kumar
- Written by: Mohan Kumar; Ved Rahi
- Produced by: Mohan Kumar
- Starring: Rajendra Kumar; Sadhana; Prem Chopra
- Edited by: Suraj Prakash
- Music by: Laxmikant Pyarelal
- Release date: 1971
- Country: India
- Language: Hindi

Aap Aye Bahar Ayee (lit. 'As soon as you came, spring arrived') is a 1971 Indian Hindi-language film produced, directed and written by Mohan Kumar.

== Plot ==
Rohit, Whiskey, and Kumar are childhood friends. While travelling to his estate in the company of Whiskey, Rohit meets with the beautiful Neena and falls in love with her. Subsequently, he meets with her father where they are properly introduced. Neena accepts Rohit's proposal to marry him.

Unknowingly, Kumar also sends his proposal for marriage to Neena, who having no interest, tears up his photo before even seeing it. Hearing that, Kumar is offended and plans to take revenge. Shortly after the marriage between Neena and Rohit is officially fixed, Kumar creates circumstances through which Neena surrenders herself to Kumar, presuming that he is Rohit. Following the incident Rohit and Kumar have a huge fight where Kumar loses sight in his left eye.

Feeling that she is not worthy of Rohit anymore, Neena refuses to marry him. Her father has a fatal heart attack when he learns the truth. Neena catches a train and tries to leave, but falls unconscious inside. Rohit rescues her. Neena discovers that she is pregnant with Kumar's baby and tries kill herself. Rohit stops her from doing so and marries her at a Shiv Mandir.

Kumar also learns about the baby, and goes to Rohit's house to discuss it, but meets an angry response. While he and Rohit are having an argument, Rohit says that the child is not his. Kumar secretly records this information. Rohit brings up the child as his own son. Many years later, Kumar, now an infamous international criminal, shows up at Rohit's son's birthday party, demanding money from Rohit and blackmailing him with the recording. Having no choice Rohit agrees. Kumar arrives for the money and picks it up but is confronted by Neena holding a pistol, on his way out. When Neena threatens to kill him he manages to kidnap her son and flees. Rohit pursues him. After a long and gruelling fight, Kumar throws Rohit's son into the water. when a badly injured Rohit dives to save him, then Neena fatally shoots Kumar. Rohit, Neena and their son live happily ever after.

== Songs ==
Aap Aye Bahar Ayee was a hit album. The music for the film was composed by Laxmikant Pyarelal and the lyrics, by Anand Bakshi.

1. "Tumko Bhi To Aisa Kuchh Hota" – Kishore Kumar, Lata Mangeshkar
2. "Mujhe Teri Mohabbat Ka Sahara" – Mohammed Rafi, Lata Mangeshkar
3. "Koyel Kyon Gaaye" – Mohammed Rafi, Lata Mangeshkar
4. "Poochhe Jo Koi Mujhse" – Mohammed Rafi
5. "Aap Aye Bahaar Ayee" – Mohammed Rafi
6. "Tare Kitne Neel Gagan Pe Tare" – Mohammed Rafi, Hemlata

== Cast ==
- Rajendra Kumar as Rohit Verma
- Sadhana as Neena
- Prem Chopra as Kumar
- Rajendra Nath as Whiskey
- Sarita Devi
- Raj Mehra as Bakshi (Neena's dad)
- Mumtaz Begum as Mrs. Verma
- Meena T as Rasilee
- Kamaldeep as Manager
- Madhu Apte
- Subhash
- Bobby
- Kodi S. Irani
- Surendra
- Prem Kumar
- Lamba
- Raj Kumar
- Shaikh
- Uma Khosla
- Master Rohit
