= Anpadh =

1962 film

- Directed by: Mohan Kumar
- Written by: Mohan Kumar; Sarshar Sailani
- Produced by: Rajendra Bhatia; Mohan Segal
- Starring: Balraj Sahni; Dharmendra; Mala Sinha
- Cinematography: M. Ramachandra
- Edited by: Pratap Dave
- Music by: Madan Mohan
- Release date: 1 July 1962
- Country: India
- Language: Hindi

Anpadh (Hindi: अनपढ़, Urdu: اَنپڑھ, translation: illiterate) is a 1962 Hindi film. It stars Balraj Sahni, Dharmendra, Mala Sinha, Shashikala. Actress Bindu made her first prominent appearance in this film with the song Jiya Le Gayo Ji Mora Sanwariya. The music is by Madan Mohan and the lyrics by Raja Mehdi Ali Khan. The film focuses on the importance of education for girls. This movie has the evergreen song "Aapki Nazron Ne Samjha", sung by Lata Mangeshkar.

== Plot ==
Shambunath "Shambu" is a rich man who lives with his younger sister Lajwanti "Lajjo". Shambu feels that accumulation of wealth is much more important than education because of which Lajjo becomes illiterate. Lajjo is a naive young girl, who doesn't know to do household chores. Many days later, Shambu gets Lajjo married to Deepak, another young man who comes from a rich family. Lajjo is devastated to know that Deepak is a bibliophile and is highly educated. She confesses to the family about her illiteracy much to the disappointment of Deepak. As a result, her marital life is destroyed and she is mistreated by her own husband, in-laws and her school going brother-in-law Kishore.

One day, Deepak catches Lajjo, when she was asking the servant to write a letter to Shambu. When Deepak reads the letter, he finds that Lajjo lied to Shambu that her in-laws are taking good care of her and she is leading a happy life. Deepak, is deeply moved by her innocence and apologizes for what happened and promises to teach her to read and write. The couples are much more delighted after they know that Lajjo is pregnant. However, fate plays another game when Shambu has an argument with Deepak's father, Thakur Mahendranath where Lajjo intervenes and condemns Shambu. A disappointed Shambu angrily storms away. Deepak who got to know of this, decides to bring back Shambu. Unfortunately, as he is going, his car bumps onto a tree. Deepak is hospitalized but dies very soon.

Lajjo is left all alone and at the same time, Mahendranath and his wife blames Lajjo for Deepak's death and expels her from their house, leaving her destitute. She goes back to her house but finds it locked. Later, she gets to know that Shambu fled from the area after he murdered a zamindar. She wanders around for a job but is unable to get a job because of her naivety. She comes across her friend Basanti who takes Lajjo to her home, where she gives birth to a girl. After, hearing her story, Basanti pities her and many days later, Lajjo learns sewing, cooking and a lot other chores, gets a job and earns enough money. She is able to provide education to her daughter, Kiran. Meanwhile, Lajjo makes herself at Basanti's home.

Years pass by, Lajjo becomes aged and Kiran grows up. She is studious and intelligent. During her graduation, Mahendranath is the guest. Mahendranath is impressed by Kiran and gives her a job, unaware that she is his granddaughter. Kiran is in love with a young lawyer. Kishore too has grown up, he is irresponsible. One day Kishore kidnaps Kiran. Lajjo runs behind the car in which she was abducted. This is when, an aged and poor Shambu finds her and recognizes her.

With the help of Shambu, Lajjo rescues Kiran and shoots Kishore with his pistol. Shambu takes the blame for the murder. In the court, Lajjo recognizes Shambu. Overcome with guilt, she confesses the crime. However, the court sentences Shambu to 5 years of prison. The siblings have an emotional goodbye. Mahendranath apologizes to Lajjo for mistreating her. Shambu confesses his mistake for not educating Lajjo and promises that he will return. Shambu advises Lajjo to sell their old mine and start a new school for girls.

The film ends with Lajjo fulfilling her brother's advise by starting a school with the help of Kiran who is now happily married to her lover.

== Cast ==
- Balraj Sahni as Chaudhary Shambhunath
- Dharmendra as Deepak
- Mala Sinha as Lajwanti "Lajjo"
- Shashikala as Basanti
- Bindu as Kiran
- Nazir Hussain as Thakur Mahendranath
- Mumtaz Begum as Mrs. Mahendranath
- Dhumal as Kalu
- Mohan Choti as Young Kalu
- Aruna Irani as Young Lajwanti
- Kharaiti as Munshi
- Baby Shashi as Young Basanti
- Brahm Bhardwaj as Public Prosecutor
- Ram Mohan as Jeevan Chaudhary

== Music ==
All songs were written by lyricist Raja Mehdi Ali Khan and music composed by Madan Mohan. "Aap Ki Nazron Ne Samjha" is an evergreen song from this movie.

Song	Singer(s)	Raga
"Aap Ki Nazron Ne Samjha..."	Lata Mangeshkar	
"Hai Issi Mein Pyar Ki Aabroo..."	Lata Mangeshkar	
"Rang Birangi Rakhi Leke Aayi..."	Lata Mangeshkar	
"Woh Dekho, Jala Ghar Kisi Ka..."	Lata Mangeshkar	
"Jiya Le Gayo Ji Mora..."	Lata Mangeshkar	Yaman Kalyan
"Sikandar Ne Poras Se Ki Thhi..."	Mahendra Kapoor	
"Dulhan Marwad Ki Aayi Chham Chham, Dulho Lakhanau Ro Ji..."	Mohammed Rafi, Asha Bhosle	
