= Mera Saaya =

1966 Hindi film

- Poster
- Directed by: Raj Khosla
- Screenplay by: G.R. Kamath
- Based on: Pathlag by Raja Paranjape
- Produced by: Premji
- Starring: Sadhana; Sunil Dutt; K.N. Singh; Prem Chopra
- Cinematography: V. Babasaheb
- Edited by: Das Dhaimad
- Music by: Madan Mohan
- Release date: 10 June 1966
- Running time: 140 minutes
- Country: India
- Language: Hindi
- Box office: 4.5 crore

Mera Saaya (transl. My Shadow) is a 1966 Indian Hindi-language thriller film directed by Raj Khosla. The music is by Madan Mohan, and lyrics are by Raja Mehdi Ali Khan. The film stars Sunil Dutt and Sadhana. The film is the second of the suspense-thriller trilogy of Khosla-Sadhana partnership, the other two being Woh Kaun Thi? (1964) and Anita (1967). The film became a box office success. It is a remake of the 1964 Marathi film Pathlaag (The Chase).

Manohar Amberkar won the Filmfare Best Sound Award.

== Plot ==
Thakur Rakesh Singh, an affluent descendant of the royalty, is a lawyer and happily married to Geeta for three years. He goes to London for higher studies and after one year receives the news of his wife's illness. He immediately comes back only to witness his wife's death in his hands. He builds a small memorial in her memory in his mansion. He deeply mourns her by always sitting at that memorial and listening to recorded songs sung by Geeta.

Meanwhile, a police inspector, Daljit, comes to meet him and tells him about a bandit they caught the other day, Raina, who claims to be the wife of Rakesh. Rakesh meets her and is shocked as she looks exactly like Geeta. He refuses that she was his wife as he saw his wife dying and cremated her with his own hands. However, the woman claims that she is indeed Geeta and tells him about intimate moments they shared. Rakesh is surprised but suspects some mischief on her part.

The case proceeds in the court and Rakesh starts to cross-examine her. She answers every question correctly and claims that she was kidnapped by someone two to three days before her arrest. When Rakesh asks why she has no mangala sutra on her, which is a traditional cultural ornament for married Hindu women, she tells him that she removed it before going out on that day. He does not believe her, as Geeta considered the mangala sutra very sacred and wouldn't have removed it.

After some drama, he asks her about her diary, which Geeta always keeps near her and she fails to answer. He decides that she is an impostor and asks the court to convict her. She becomes emotionally unstable and ends up in a mental institution. One night, she escapes from there and comes to Rakesh's house. There, she explains to Rakesh what had happened.

Geeta had a twin sister named Nisha, who was a bandit just like their mother. Geeta hid the fact about her criminal family and married Rakesh. But one day her sister arrived in a pitiable condition and asked her for shelter for one night. Geeta, seeing her sick, decided to buy medicine. As she didn't want her family members to know about Nisha, she switched attire with her twin and naively gave her mangalsutra to Nisha before heading out of the house. Ranjit Singh, Nisha's husband, mistook her for Nisha and takes her away without giving her a chance to explain. When Ranjit Singh discovers that she wasn't Nisha, he wanted to take her back, but the police arrested them on the way back. While she was explaining this to Rakesh, Ranjit Singh arrives and confirms her story. Police shoot him and he dies at Nisha's memorial. Rakesh and Geeta reconcile and continue their domestic life.

== Cast ==
- Sunil Dutt as Thakur Rakesh Singh
- Sadhana Shivdasani as Geeta / Raina (aka Nisha)
- Shivraj as Family Doctor
- K.N. Singh as Prosecuting Lawyer
- Anwar Hussain as Inspector Daljit
- Prem Chopra as Daku Suryavar Singh / Ranjit Singh
- Manmohan as Doctor (in mental hospital)
- Dhumal as Bankeji
- Mukri as Munshiji
- Jagdish Sethi as Judge

== Music ==
The music for the film is composed by Madan Mohan. All the lyrics for the soundtrack were written by Raja Mehdi Ali Khan. The song "Jhumka Gira Re" was remade as "What Jhumka?" in Rocky Aur Rani Kii Prem Kahaani.

#	Title	Singer(s)	Duration	Raga
1	"Jhumka Gira Re"	Asha Bhosle	03:29	
2	"Aap Ke Pahloo Mein"	Mohammed Rafi	03:32	
3	"Mera Saaya Saath"	Lata Mangeshkar	06:02	Nand
4	"Nainon Me Badra Chhaye"	Lata Mangeshkar	03:34	Bhimpalasi
5	"Nainon Wali Ne"	Lata Mangeshkar	02:56	
6	"Mera Saaya Saath – 2"	Lata Mangeshkar	04:21	Nand
