= Char Dervesh =

1964 film by Homi Wadia

- Poster
- Directed by: Homi Wadia
- Written by: C. L. Cavish
- Screenplay by: JBH Wadia
- Story by: C. L. Cavish
- Produced by: Wadia Brothers Production
- Starring: Feroz Khan; Sayeeda Khan; Naaz
- Cinematography: Agha Hasham
- Edited by: Shaikh Ismail
- Music by: G. S. Kohli
- Production company: Basant Studios
- Release date: 1964
- Running time: 155 minutes
- Country: India
- Language: Hindi

Char Dervesh (transl. Four Seekers) is a 1964 Indian Hindi-language action fantasy film directed by Homi Wadia for Basant Pictures. The film was produced by Wadia Brothers and its music composer was G. S. Kohli. Feroz Khan acted in several "small-budget" costume films such as Homi Wadia's Char Dervesh as hero, before he became popular as second lead and later as hero, producer and director in mainstream cinema. The film was declared a hit. The film starred Feroz Khan, Sayeeda Khan, Naaz, B. M. Vyas, Mukri and Sunder.

The fantasy film revolves around Qamar, who is in love with the princess Nargis Banu and his adventures that follow in an attempt to rescue the princess' sister Hamida.

== Plot ==
Three Derveshes are praying at a shrine, each has a wish to fulfil but that can't happen till a fourth one arrives. A white horse appears with a rider, and it is the fourth Dervesh who is seeking to redeem himself. His name is Qamar. Qamar has been a care-free person who is getting into trouble for his innocent misdeeds and basically a source of worry for his two covetous brothers.

Qamar sees the beautiful princess Nargis Bano and falls in love with her. However, he is caught by the palace guards, whipped, and sent to exile. His brothers throw him off the ship they are travelling in and he lands in an underwater sea kingdom. He sees a woman turned to stone up to her neck. There is another princess, Hamida, imprisoned there by an evil magician. The stone woman turns out to be the mother of the two princesses and she wants Qamar to marry the imprisoned princess.

Qamar fails to fulfill her demand and in turn, the stone-lady is angered and she turns Qamar's skin black and thus, he meets the other three dervishes. After the stone-lady learns the facts, she forgives him and the problem with the skin is reversed. He now has to decide which princess to marry. Several actions and chase scenes follow, with sword-fighting and flying on magic carpets to rescue the princess and finally marry the one he loves.

== Cast ==
- Feroz Khan as Qamar Bakht
- Sayeeda Khan as Nargis
- Naaz as Hameeda
- Mukri
- B. M. Vyas
- Amarnath
- Ratnamala
- Jeevankala
- Sunder
- W. M. Khan
- Paul Sharma

== Production ==
Babubhai Mistry was once again the art and special effects director for the Wadia film. He had made a name for himself as a special effects artist in mythology and fantasy films. Char Dervesh had plenty of special effects in the form of underwater sea kingdom, two-headed monsters and flying carpets. The film was a "classic B-movie" with many fight and "stunt" scenes.

== Music ==
The music was composed by G. S. Kohli and the lyricists were Anjaan, Saba Fazli and Raja Mehdi Ali Khan. The playback singing was given by Mohammed Rafi, Asha Bhosle, Usha Mangeshkar and Jaani Babu Qawwal.

=== Song list ===
Song	Singer
"Gusse Mein Tum"	Mohammed Rafi
"Tere Karam Ki Dhoom Jahan Mein Kahan Nahin"	Mohammed Rafi, Jaani Babu Qawwal
"Pyar Ke Daman Se Lipte Hum Kahan Tak Aa Gaye"	Mohammed Rafi, Asha Bhosle
"Le Liya, Dil Mera Le Liya"	Asha Bhosle
"Kali Kali Aankhon Mein"	Asha Bhosle
"Tadpa Le Jitna Chahe, Tera Ikhtiyar Hai"	Asha Bhosle, Usha Mangeshkar
