= Mumtaz Begum (actress) =

Indian film actress (1923–2002)

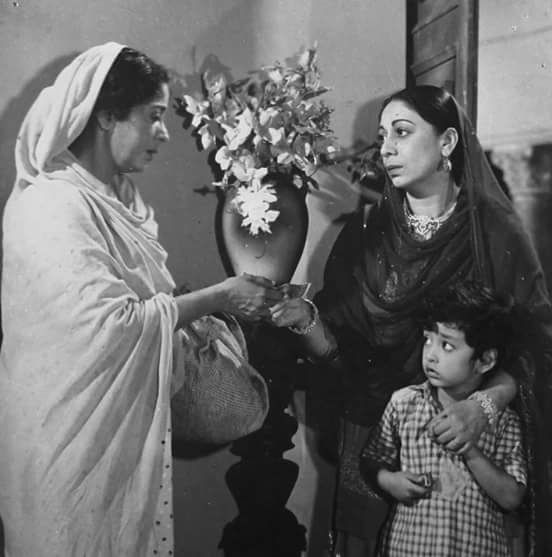
- Leela Chitnis (left) and Mumtaz Begum (right) in Dil Hi To Hai (1963)
- Born: 7 April 1923; Bombay, Bombay Presidency, British India
- Died: 9 March 2002 (aged 78); Mumbai, Maharashtra, India
- Occupation: Actress
- Years active: 1940–1998
- Relatives: Nazneen (niece)

Mumtaz Begum (7 April 1923 – 9 March 2002) was an Indian actress who appeared in Hindi and Punjabi films.

== Life and career ==
Begum was born in Bombay, Bombay Presidency, British India on 7 April 1923. She acted as a character actor playing the roles of mothers and grandmothers in films like Barsaat Ki Raat (1960), Chaudhvin Ka Chand (1960) and Mere Mehboob (1963).

== Personal life and death ==
Begum was the aunt of Bollywood actress Nazneen. She died in Mumbai on 9 March 2002, aged 78.

== Filmography ==
- Dahej (1950)
- Deewana (1952)
- Jagriti (1954)
- Yasmin (1955)
- Jhanak Jhanak Payal Baaje (1955)
- New Delhi (1956)
- Lajwanti (1958)
- Kala Pani (1958)
- Chirag Kahan Roshni Kahan (1959)
- Chambe Di Kali (1960) Punjabi film
- Kala Bazar (1960)
- Ek Phool Char Kaante (1960)
- Barsat Ki Rat (1960)
- Parakh (1960)
- Chaudhvin Ka Chand (1960)
- Opera House (1961)
- Aas Ka Panchhi (1961)
- Dr. Vidya (1962)
- Dil Tera Deewana (1962)
- Anpadh (1962)
- Mere Mehboob (1963)
- Dil Hi To Hai (1963)
- Ayee Milan Ki Bela (1964)
- Aap Ki Parchhaiyan (1964)
- Sunghursh (1968)
- Neel Kamal (1968)
- Nanak Dukhiya Sub Sansar (1970) Punjabi film
- Mehboob Ki Mehndi (1971)
- Gambler (1971)
- Aap Aye Bahaar Ayee (1971)
- Kankan De Ohle (1971)
- Tere Mere Sapne (1971)
- Apna Desh (1972)
- Dil Diwana (1974)
- Apradhi (1974)
- Rafoo Chakkar (1975)
- Yamla Jatt (1976) Punjabi movie
- Laila Majnu (1976)
- Taakra (1976) Punjabi film
- Santo Banto (1976) Punjabi film
- Aadmi Sadak Ka (1977)
- Bhola Bhala (1978)
- Aakhri Kasam (1979)
- Aatish (1979)
- Jwalamukhi (1980)
- Amrit (1986)
