= Jab Yaad Kisi Ki Aati Hai =

- Poster
- Starring: Dharmendra; Mala Sinha; Abhi Bhattacharya
- Music by: Madan Mohan; Raja Mehdi Ali Khan (lyrics)
- Release date: 1967
- Country: India
- Language: Hindi

Jab Yaad Kisi Ki Aati Hai is a 1967 Bollywood film starring Dharmendra and Mala Sinha in a double role, Abhi Bhattacharya and M. Rajan. It is a love story with a little suspense.

The film was a box office hit.

== Cast ==
- Dharmendra
- Mala Sinha
- Abhi Bhattacharya
- M. Rajan

== Soundtrack ==
Music by Madan Mohan and lyrics by Raja Mehdi Ali Khan.

1. "Tere Bin Saawan Kaise Bita" – Lata Mangeshkar
2. "Dhoondhe Tujhko Nain Deewaane" – Mahendra Kapoor, Lata Mangeshkar
3. "Jab Yaad Kisi Ki Aati Hai" – Lata Mangeshkar, Mahendra Kapoor
4. "Ari O Shok Kaliyo" – Mahendra Kapoor
5. "Ishq Daulat Se Kharida Nahi Jaataa Pyare" – Mahendra Kapoor
6. "Kyu Mere Dil Ko Karaar" – Mahendra Kapoor, Lata Mangeshkar
7. "Piya Se Milan Hoyi Gaya Re" – Lata Mangeshkar
