= Mere Mehboob =

1963 film

- Film poster
- Directed by: H. S. Rawail
- Produced by: H. S. Rawail
- Starring: Ashok Kumar; Rajendra Kumar; Sadhana; Nimmi
- Music by: Naushad
- Release date: 1963
- Running time: 164 minutes.
- Country: India
- Languages: Hindi; Urdu
- Box office: 6 Crore

Mere Mehboob ("My Beloved") is a 1963 Indian film directed by Harnam Singh Rawail and starring Ashok Kumar, Rajendra Kumar, Sadhana, Nimmi, Pran, Johnny Walker and Ameeta.

The film became a blockbuster and took the number one position at the box office in 1963. A Muslim social film, it drew a background from Aligarh Muslim University, Aligarh and traditional Lucknow. The famous song "Mere Mehboob Tujhe Meri Mohabbat Ki Qasam" was shot in the University Hall and in a couple of places, one gets to see the university. The opening scene of the movie shows the famous residential hall and the associated clock tower; "Victoria Gate".

== Plot ==
While studying in Aligarh Muslim University, Anwar Hussain Anwar falls in love with a veiled woman and is unable to get her out of his mind. En route to Lucknow, they meet with Nawab Buland Akhtar Changezi, and subsequently meet with him a few days later so that he can use his influence to secure an editor's job for Anwar with a magazine. Nawab then asks Anwar to teach his sister, Husna, some poetry, to which he agrees, and eventually finds that she is the very same veiled woman. Both fall in love with each other and the Nawab approves of this alliance, even though Anwar lives a poor lifestyle. The formal engagement ceremony takes place and arrangements are made for the wedding to take place soon. The heavily indebted Nawab does not realize that soon he will find Anwar in the company of a lowly courtesan, Najma; and pressure will be brought on him to get Husna to marry wealthy Munne Raja - who is all set to auction the former's mansion as well as belongings. But at the end Husna marries Anwar Hussain and Nawab recovers his along with all the belongings.

== Cast & Characters ==
Character	Portrayed By
Anwar Hussain Anwar	Rajendra Kumar
Husna Bano	Sadhana
Najma (Anwar's Sister)	Nimmi
Nawab Buland Akhtar (Husna's Brother)	Ashok Kumar
Munne Raja (Buland Akhter's cousin)	Pran
Bindadeen Rastogi (Anwar's Friend)	Johnny Walker
Naseem Ara (Buland Akhtar & Husna's Cousin)	Ameeta
Naseem's Paternal Aunty	Mumtaz Begum
Bindadeen's love interest	Malika

== Music ==
Mere Mehboob

Soundtrack album by Naushad
- Released: 1963
- Genre: Feature film soundtrack
- Label: EMI

Naushad chronology
Son of India (1961)	Mere Mehboob (1963)	Leader (1964)

The soundtrack for the movie was composed by Naushad with lyrics by Shakeel Badayuni. The soundtrack consists of 9 songs, featuring vocals by Mohammed Rafi, Lata Mangeshkar and Asha Bhosle. The song Mere Mehboob Tujhe Meri Mohabbat Ki Qasam, Phir Mujhe Nargasi Aankhon Ka Sahara Daydei became very popular upon release.

=== Song list ===
No.	Title	Singer(s)	Length
1.	"Mere Mehboob Tujhe, Meri Mohabbat Ki Qasam" (Raga Jhinjhoti)	Mohammad Rafi	8:12
2.	"Tere Pyar Mein Dildar, Jo Hai Mera Haal-e-Zaar" (Raga Bihag)	Lata Mangeshkar	3:03
3.	"Ae - Husn Zara Jaag Tujhe Ishq Jagaaye"	Mohammad Rafi	3:31
4.	"Mere Mehboob Mein Kya Nahin"	Lata Mangeshkar and Asha Bhosle	4:11
5.	"Tumse Izhar - E -Haal Kar Baithe"	Mohammad Rafi	3:28
6.	"Janeman Ek Nazar Dekh Le"	Lata Mangeshkar and Asha Bhosle	3:37
7.	"Yaad Mein Teri Jaag Jaag Hum" (Raga Darbari Kanada)	Lata Mangeshkar and Mohammad Rafi	4:27
8.	"Allah Bachaye Naujawano Se"	Lata Mangeshkar	4:27
9.	"Mere Mehboob Tujhe, Meri Mohabbat Ki Qasam (Female)" (Raga Jhinjhoti)	Lata Mangeshkar	4:45

== Box office ==
The film grossed ₹60 million at the Indian box office, which in US dollars was $12,600,000 (equivalent to $133,000,000 in 2025).

== Awards and nominations ==
National Film Awards

- 1963: Certificate of Merit for the Second Best Feature Film in Hindi

Filmfare Awards

- Filmfare Best Art Direction Award - Sudhendu Roy (Winner)
- Filmfare Nomination for Best Supporting Actor-Johnny Walker
- Filmfare Nomination for Best Supporting Actress-Ameeta
- Filmfare Nomination for Best Supporting Actress-Nimmi
- Filmfare Nomination for Best Music Director-Naushad
- Filmfare Nomination for Best Lyricist-Shakeel Badayuni for the song "Mere Mehboob Tujhe Mere"
- Filmfare Nomination for Best Playback Singer-Mohd. Rafi for the song "Mere Mehboob Tujhe Mere"
