= Rajkumar (1964 film) =

- Poster
- Directed by: K. Shankar
- Written by: Ramanand Sagar
- Starring: Prithviraj Kapoor; Shammi Kapoor; Sadhana; Pran
- Music by: Shankar–Jaikishan
- Release date: 20 October 1964
- Country: India
- Language: Hindi

Rajkumar (transl. Prince) is a 1964 Hindi film directed by K. Shankar. It stars Prithviraj Kapoor, Shammi Kapoor, Sadhana, Pran, Om Prakash. The music is by Shankar–Jaikishan and the lyrics were written by Hasrat Jaipuri and Shailendra. The film became a huge box office hit.

== Plot ==
The Maharaja is eager to see his foreign-returned son, Bhanupratap, who will eventually take over the reign of the region. When he finally gets to see his son, he is shocked to see that the crown prince is in fact a "clown" prince. He openly shows his disgust and disappointment, and decides to continue to rule. Bhanupratap and his friend, Kapil, decide to dress incognito and mingle with the general public and find out if there is anyone conspiring to dethrone the king. What they find out will change their lives, and endanger the lives of their loved ones as well.

The antagonist Narpat, who is the brother of prince's stepmother kills the tribal king and incriminates Bhanupratap of the murder, compelling his daughter Princess Sangeeta to avenge her father's death. The Maharaja however, assures her that justice will be done the next day. Bhanupratap escapes the palace with the help of his friend and disguises himself as Bhagatram, while romancing the unaware princess. Finally, the Prince manages to get proof of his innocence to the Maharaja, but Narpat imprisons the king by binding him on his throne far away from public view and ask the princess to avenge her father's death by shooting the prince with a bow and arrow and accidentally also reveals that Bhanupratap was disguised as Bhagatram. Sangeeta though not happy to shoot the love of her life, lifts the bow to shoot the prince when all the prince's friends, nanny and well wishers attack Narpat's goons, thereby rescuing the Maharaja in the process. The Prince and Narpat had a fight at the end and he hands over Narpat to the princess. The princess shoots Narpat, the real murderer of her father. The Prince and the Princess get married and live happily ever after.

== Cast ==
- Prithviraj Kapoor as Maharaja
- Shammi Kapoor as Prince Bhanupratap / Bhagatram
- Sadhana as Princess Sangeeta
- Pran as Narpat
- Om Prakash as Bimasal
- Rajendranath as Kapil / Jagatram
- Achala Sachdev as Padma
- Tun Tun as Champakali
- Manorama as Maharani Kalavanti
- K. V. Shanthi as Princess Sangeeta's Maid
- Shivraj - Diwan

== Soundtrack ==
Song	Lyricist	Singer
"Janewale, Zara Hoshiyar"	Shailendra	Mohammed Rafi
"Tumne Kisi Ki Jaan Ko Jaate Hue Dekhai Hai"	Hasrat Jaipuri	Mohammed Rafi
"Is Rang Badalti Duniya Mein"	Hasrat Jaipuri	Mohammed Rafi
"Tumne Pukara Aur Hum Chale Aaye"	Hasrat Jaipuri	Mohammed Rafi, Suman Kalyanpur
"Dilruba Dil Pe Tu Yeh Sitam Kiye Ja"	Shailendra	Mohammed Rafi, Asha Bhosle
"Nach Re Man Badkamma, Thumak Thumak Badkamma"	Shailendra	Lata Mangeshkar, Asha Bhosle
"Aaja Aayi Bahar"	Shailendra	Lata Mangeshkar
