= Raja Mehdi Ali Khan =

Indian poet, writer and lyricist (1915–1966)

- Born: 23 September 1915; Wazirabad, Punjab Province, British India (present day Gujranwala District, Punjab, Pakistan)
- Died: 29 July 1966 (aged 50); Bombay, Maharashtra, India
- Occupations: Poet, Writer and Film Lyricist
- Years active: 1946–1966
- Notable work: Wrote popular songs for films Shaheed; Anpadh; Woh Kaun Thi? Mera Saaya
- Spouse: Tahira
- Parents: Raja Mehdi Ghalib Khan (father); Hubia Khanum (Heebe Saheba) (mother)

Raja Mehdi Ali Khan (23 September 1915 – 29 July 1966) was an Indian poet, writer and a lyricist.

== Early life and career ==
Raja Mehdi Ali Khan was born on 23 September 1915 at Karamabad village, near Wazirabad, Gujranwala District of Punjab, British India, now Pakistan. Mehdi Ali lost his father Raja Mehdi Ghalib Khan when he was four. His mother Hubia Khanum (Heebe Saheba) who was the sister of Maulana Zafar Ali Khan, a prominrnt journalist, got him educated and he completed his basic education at Islamia College (Lahore).

As he grew up, Mehdi Ali started working at the editorial staff of Phool and Tehzeeb-e-Niswan Urdu magazineas from Lahore. He was heavily influenced by the noted scholar Allama Muhammad Iqbal during his formative years, affecting his poetic writing. Then he joined as a writer at the All India Radio, Delhi in 1942. Here he got acquainted with the noted writer Saadat Hasan Manto. Manto, who was active in the Hindi film industry, asked film actor Ashok Kumar to find Mehdi Ali some kind of a job. He soon got a film called Aath Din (1946) in which he not only wrote dialogues but also acted. Sashadhar Mukherjee, one of the partners in Filmistan Studio, gave Mehdi Ali a chance to write lyrics for his film, Do Bhai (1947). Songs from the film such as "Mera Sunder Sapna Beet Gaya" and "Yaad Karoge" became instant hits.

In 1947, Mehdi and his wife Tahira decided to stay in India instead of migrating to Pakistan. They came to this decision despite the wave of riots plaguing the country. In 1948, his patriotism manifested in his songs, "Watan Ki Raah Mein" and "Todi Todi Bachche", which were used in the film Shaheed.

He worked with music composers including Ghulam Haider, Sachin Dev Burman, Iqbal Qureshi, Babul, S. Mohinder, Chic Chocolate, and Rono Mukherjee. He also wrote songs for C. Ramchandra, Datta Naik ("Sare Jahan Se Acha Hindustan Hamara"), O. P. Nayyar ("Main Pyar Ka Raahi Hoon") and Laxmikant Pyarelal ("Jaal","Anita"), Kalyanji-Anandji.

He formed a successful partnership with Madan Mohan which began with Madhosh in 1951. It was also Madan Mohan's third film as a music director. The two shared a great rapport and their later collaborations in films such as Anpadh, Mera Saaya, Woh Kaun Thi?, Neela Akash, Dulhan Ek Raat Ki, Anita and Nawab Sirajuddaulah proved to be massive hits. His song Lag Jaa Gale from Woh Kaun Thi ? was named among the top ten all-time favorites in film history to be "retired" from Antakshari on Zee TV.

== Death ==
He died in Mumbai on 29 July 1966 at a premature age of 50. He and his wife Tahira, remained childless even though he himself loved to interact with children. It is said that when he was seriously ill and was on his deathbed, even then he kept his humorous side and was seen laughing with his visitors.

== Filmography ==
Year	Film	Note		
1946	8 Days	Khan made his entry in the industry with this film. In this film, he worked as an actor and dialogue writer.		
Year	Film	Songs written	Music Director(s)	Notes
1947	Do Bhai	9 (All)	Sachin Dev Burman	Debut film as a lyricist
1948	Actress	3	Shyam Sundar Gaba	
1948	Shaheed	4	Ghulam Haider	
1948	Vidya	1	Sachin Dev Burman	
1948	Ziddi	1	Khemchand Prakash	
1949	Kamal	2	Sachin Dev Burman	
1949	Namoona	1	Ramchandra Narhar Chitalkar	
1950	Ankhen	4	Madan Mohan Kohli	
1950	Bhai Bahen	3	Shyam Sundar Gaba	
1950	Maang	1	Ghulam Mohammed	
1950	Magroor	6	Sajjad Hussain (separately), Bulo C. Rani & Ram Panjwani	
1950	Muqaddar	4	Khemchand Prakash & Bhola Shreshtha	
1950	Nirdosh	6	Shyam Sundar Gaba	
1950	Sangram	2	Ramchandra Narhar Chitalkar	
1951	Ada	1	Madan Mohan Kohli	
1951	Daman	6	Datta Korgaonkar	
1951	Gumashta	5	Datta Korgaonkar	
1951	Hamari Shaan	1	Chitragupta Srivastava	
1951	Madhosh	9 (All)	Madan Mohan Kohli	
1951	Ustad Pedro	8 (All)	Ramchandra Narhar Chitalkar	One of Khan's song of this film "Mere Husn Ke Charche Aam Huye Hain Gali Gali" sung by Shamshad Begum with music by C. Ramchandra was originally recorded for this film & re-used in the film Do Bahadur (1953).
1952	Bagdad	8 (All)	Bulo C. Rani	
1952	Izzat	7	Bulo C. Rani	
1952	Nishan Danka	2	Basant Prakash	
1952	Rangeeli	9 (All)	Chic Chocolate	
1952	Saloni	3	Basant Prakash	
1952	Shrimatiji	8	Jimmy, Basant Prakash & Mohinder Singh Sarna (all separately)	
1953	Anand Bhavan	4	Vasant Desai	
1953	Bahadur	1	Mohinder Singh Sarna	
1953	Do Bahadur	1	Ramchandra Narhar Chitalkar	Khan's sole song of this film "Mere Husn Ke Charche Aam Huye Hain Gali Gali" sung by Shamshad Begum with music by C. Ramchandra (his only song for the film too) was originally recorded for the film Ustad Pedro (1951) & re-used in this film.
1953	Gul Sanobar	1	Bulo C. Rani	
1953	Husn Ka Chor	6	Bulo C. Rani	
1953	Khoj	4	Nisar Bazmi	
1953	Ladla	5	Vinod	
1953	Manchala	7 (All)	Chitragupta Srivastava	
1953	Mehmaan	1	Anil Krishna Biswas	
1953	Papi	1	Mohinder Singh Sarna	
1953	Thokar	1	Sardar Malik	
1954	Adhikar	3	Avinash Anandrai Vyas	
1954	Alibaba Aur 40 Chor	8 (All)	Shri Nath Tripathi & Chitragupta Srivastava	
1954	Aulad	2	Sardar Malik	
1954	Barati	2	Roshan Lal Nagrath	
1954	Chandni Chowk	1	Roshan Lal Nagrath	
1954	Dak Babu	2	Dhaniram	
1954	Guzaara	5	Ghulam Mohammed	
1954	Maan	1	Anil Krishna Biswas	
1954	Miss Mala	4	Chitragupta Srivastava	
1954	Sher Dil	2	Mohammed Shafi Niyazi (Shafi M. Nagri)	
1954	Toote Khilone	At least 3	Chitragupta Srivastava	
1955	Abe-Hayat	1	Sardar Malik	
1955	Albeli	2	Ravi Shankar Sharma	
1955	Bandish	1	Hemant Kumar	
1955	Chirag-e-Chin	6 (All)	Shri Nath Tripathi	
1955	Enam	6	Shri Nath Tripathi	
1955	Jalwa	1	Vinod	
1955	Madhur Milan	2	Bulo C. Rani	
1955	Mastani	7	Baldev Nath Bali	
1955	Shahi Chor	1	Dhaniram	
1955	Shahi Mehman	2	Bipin Datta & Babul Bose	
1956	Aabroo	1	Bulo C. Rani	
1956	Badshah Salamat	1	Bulo C. Rani	
1956	Hamara Watan	2	Hemant Kumar	
1956	Hatim Tai	6	Shri Nath Tripathi	
1956	Indar Sabha	1	Allah Rakha Qureshi	
1956	Inqilab	8 (All)	Hansraj Behl	
1956	Naqab Posh	1	Dhumi Khan	
1956	Noor-e-Yaman alias Hatim Tai Ka Beta	3	Bulo C. Rani	
1956	Zindagi	1	Mohammed Shafi Niyazi	
1957	Bada Bhai	1	Nashad	
1957	Captain Kishore	3	Chitragupta Srivastava	
1957	Diler Daku	2	Mohammed Shafi Niyazi (Shafi M. Nagri)	
1957	Garma Garam	1 (maybe)	Vinod	For the song "Humko Toh Mohabbat Hai Unse" sung by Shamshad Begum, Mohammed Rafi & Asha Bhosle with music by Vinod, the film's song booklet credited Khan & Pyarelal Santoshi jointly for the lyrics of the song. However, the 78 RPM records of the song credited only Santoshi, who also directed & wrote a couple of other songs of this film. Apart from being partly credited for this song, Khan did not pen any other song of this film.
1957	Mohini	7	Dattaram Baburao Naik	
1957	Paristan alias Gulbakavali	8 (All)	Shri Nath Tripathi	
1957	Parveen	4	Allah Rakha Qureshi	
1957	Shahi Bazar	2	Dhaniram	
1958	24 Ghante	8 (All)	Bipin Datta & Babul Bose	
1958	Chandu	2	Bipin Datta & Babul Bose	
1958	Devar Bhaabi	2	Ravi Shankar Sharma	
1958	Miss '58	1	Dattaram Baburao Naik	
1958	Miss Punjab Mail	4	Baldev Nath Bali	
1958	Naya Paisa	4	Mohinder Singh Sarna	
1958	Shan-e-Hatim	6	Allah Rakha Qureshi	Khan's song in the film "Bhalai Duniya Ki Jo Subah-o-Sham Karte Hain" sung by Mohammed Rafi & composed by Ustad Allah Rakha was re-used in the film Idd Ka Chand (1964).
1959	Bhai Bahen	1	Dattaram Baburao Naik	This film was released in 1959 but it appears that its music records were issued in 1957 under the title Black Mailer. The song "Saare Jahan Se Achcha Hindustan Hamara" sung by Asha Bhosle, used the hook lines written by Allama Muhammad Iqbal but the remaining song was penned by Raja Mehdi Ali Khan, this also being his only song for the film.
1959	Jagir	5	Madan Mohan Kohli	
1959	Maa Ke Ansoo	11 (All)	Sardar Malik	The film credited only Khan as the lyricist. However, it appears that a certain lyricist Madan Mohan wrote the lines preceding some of the songs.
1959	Zara Bachke	2	Nashad	
1960	Jaali Note	6	Omkar Prasad Nayyar	
1960	Kalpana	4	Omkar Prasad Nayyar	
1960	Masoom	4	Robin Banerjee	
1960	Mehlon Ke Khwab	3	Mohinder Singh Sarna	
1960	Mitti Mein Sona	5	Omkar Prasad Nayyar	
1961	Reshmi Roomal	8 (All)	Babul Bose	
1961	Shola Aur Shabnam	At least 2	Mohammed Zahur Khayyam Hashmi	
1962	Anpadh	7 (All)	Madan Mohan Kohli	
1962	Baaje Ghungroo	1	Dhaniram	
1962	Dr. Vidya	4	Sachin Dev Burman	
1962	Ek Musafir Ek Hasina	2	Omkar Prasad Nayyar	When this film did not do well upon its original release, it was re-edited & re-released. The song "Main Pyar Ka Raahi Hoon" sung by Mohammed Rafi & Asha Bhosle, penned by Khan & composed by O. P. Nayyar, was excluded from the revised cut. The film went on to become a hit. Even though the song didn't feature in the film, it became one of Hindi Cinema's enduring classics.
1962	Hawa Mahal		Avinash Anandrai Vyas	
1962	Hong Kong	6	Omkar Prasad Nayyar	
1962	Nakli Nawab	3	Babul Bose	
1962	Reporter Raju	2	Mohinder Singh Sarna	
1963	Captain Sheroo	3	Mohinder Singh Sarna	
1963	Naya Rasta	At least 2	Chitragupta Srivastava	
1964	Aap Ki Parchhaiyan	6 (All)	Madan Mohan Kohli	
1964	Baghi Shahzada	1	Bipin Datta	
1964	Char Dervesh	3	Gurusharan Singh Kohli	
1964	Daal Me Kala	4	Ramchandra Narhar Chitalkar	
1964	Idd Ka Chand	1	Allah Rakha Qureshi	Khan's only song in the film "Bhalai Duniya Ki Jo Subah-o-Sham Karte Hain" sung by Mohammed Rafi & composed by Ustad Allah Rakha was originally recorded for the film Shan-e-Hatim (1958) & re-used in this film.
1964	Punar Milan	1	C. Arjun	
1964	Woh Kaun Thi ?	6 (All)	Madan Mohan Kohli	
1965	Bekhabar	7 (All)	Mohinder Singh Sarna	
1965	Neela Aakash	8 (All)	Madan Mohan Kohli	Khan's song "Tere Paas Aake Mera Waqt Guzar Jaata Hai" sung by Mohammed Rafi & Asha Bhosle & composed by Madan Mohan replaced a previously recorded aong "Mere Dil Se Aake Lipat Gayi" made by the same team. The later song remained unused & unreleased. Decades later, it was included in the digital versions of the film's music album. Khan's song "Na Aasmaan Na Sitaare Fareb Dete Hain" sung by Lata Mangeshkar & composed by Madan Mohan was recorded & shot but was not included in the film.
1965	Tu Hi Meri Zindagi	5	Rono Dev Mukherjee	
1966	Do Dilon Ki Dastan	6	Omkar Prasad Nayyar	
1966	Dulhan Ek Raat Ki	8	Madan Mohan Kohli	
1966	Mera Saaya	6 (All)	Madan Mohan Kohli	The opening line of the song "Jhumka Gira Re Bareli Ke Bazaar Mein" sung by Asha Bhosle & composed by Madan Mohan was possibly taken from a folk song. Another song with the same line had appeared previously in the Hindi film Dekho Jee (1947) but had a different tune. Another song sung by Miss Dulari & recorded in 1932 had the same tune & lyrics as this song but didn't credit any composer or lyricist. Regarding the song of Mera Saaya is concerned, the remaining lyrics of this song were by Khan.
1967	Anita	4	Laxmikant-Pyarelal	Posthomous release
1967	Duniya Nachegi		Laxmikant-Pyarelal	Posthomous release
1967	Jaal	4	Laxmikant-Pyarelal	Posthomous release
1967	Jab Yaad Kisi Ki Aati Hai	7 (All)	Madan Mohan Kohli	Posthomous release
1967	Nawab Sirajuddaulah	5 (All)	Madan Mohan Kohli	Posthomous release
1967	Raaz	1	Kalyanji-Anandji	Posthomous release
1967	Sheba & Hercules	6 (All)	Chandan	Posthomous release
1970	Kaun Ho Tum ?	2	Usha Khanna	Posthomous release
1977	Bhumika	1	Vanraj Bhatia	Posthomous release
