= Dulha Dulhan =

1964 film

- Directed by: Ravindra Dave
- Screenplay by: Inder Raj Anand
- Story by: Dhruva Chatterjee
- Produced by: Ravindra Dave
- Starring: Raj Kapoor; Sadhana Shivdasani; K. N. Singh
- Cinematography: M.W. Mukadam
- Edited by: S.R. Sawant
- Music by: Kalyanji Anandji
- Release date: 1964
- Country: India
- Language: Hindi

Dulha Dulhan is a 1964 Indian Bollywood film produced and directed by Ravindra Dave. It stars Raj Kapoor and Sadhana Shivdasani in pivotal roles together for the first time.

== Soundtrack ==
#	Title	Singer(s)	Lyric(s)	Raga
1	"Mujhe Kahte Hai Kallu Qawal"	Mukesh, Lata Mangeshkar	Gulshan Bawra	
2	"Main Tera Hoon Dulha Tu Meri"	Mukesh, Lata Mangeshkar	Anand Bakshi	
3	"Hamne Tujhko Pyar Kiya Hai (Male)"	Mukesh	Indeevar	Tilak Kamod
4	"Hamne Tujhko Pyar Kiya Hai (Female)"	Lata Mangeshkar	Indeevar	Tilak Kamod
5	"Jo Pyar Tune Mujhko Diya Tha"	Mukesh	Indeevar	
6	"Jumme Ki Raat Ho Ya Din"	Mukesh, Lata Mangeshkar	Haroon	
7	"Piya Kheenche Huye Bandhe Huye"	Kamal Barot, Lata Mangeshkar	Anand Bakshi	
8	"Tum Sitam Aur Karo"	Mukesh	Indeevar	
