= Woh Kaun Thi? =

- Original poster
- Directed by: Raj Khosla
- Written by: Dhruva Chatterjee (dialogues)
- Screenplay by: Dhruva Chatterjee; Manoj Kumar
- Story by: Dhruva Chatterjee
- Produced by: N. N. Sippy; M. A. Madhu (exec.)
- Starring: Sadhana; Manoj Kumar; K.N. Singh; Helen; Prem Chopra
- Cinematography: K. H. Kapadia
- Edited by: D. N. Pai
- Music by: Madan Mohan; Raja Mehdi Ali Khan (lyrics)
- Distributed by: Prithvi Pictures
- Release date: February 7, 1964
- Running time: 140 minutes
- Country: India
- Language: Hindi

Woh Kaun Thi? (transl. Who Was She?) is a 1964 Indian Hindi-language mystery thriller film directed by Raj Khosla, starring Sadhana, Manoj Kumar and Prem Chopra. The screenplay was written by Dhruva Chatterjee, but some parts were later rewritten by others. Madan Mohan rendered the music for this movie. The film was a box-office hit. Its success had Khosla directing Sadhana in two more suspense thrillers: Mera Saaya (1966) and Anita (1967).

The film's premise is primarily taken from Wilkie Collins' fifth published novel, The Woman in White.

== Plot ==
On a rainy night, the highly reputed Dr. Anand is driving. He sees a woman standing by the road and gives her a lift. She introduces herself as No one. As soon as she steps in the car (Austin Cambridge A55 Mark II), the wipers eerily stop working. He's even more spooked when she shows him the way when it is not visible and guides him outside a cemetery. On reaching the cemetery, the gates open automatically and he hears someone sing the words "Naina Barse Rimjhim Rimjhim".

Dr. Anand is about to inherit a large fortune from a distant relative under the condition that he is perfectly mentally stable—otherwise, he would not inherit the property as there had already been cases of mental instability in his family in the past. His colleague, Dr. Lata loves Dr. Anand, but he already has a girlfriend, Seema. Soon Seema is killed by a cyanide injection and the suspects are Dr. Lata and her father, Dr. Singh, the head doctor of the hospital in which Anand and Lata work.

On a stormy night, Anand is called to a dilapidated mansion on an emergency case. There, he learns that the patient has already died. He is surprised to see that the patient is the same woman. Some policemen tell him that the place has been deserted for a while and that it is rumoured to be haunted. The policemen inform him that what he saw in the mansion happened years ago and many a doctor has registered similar cases with the police on rainy nights. On another occasion, he sees a newspaper that says that the same woman died in a rail accident.

Anand is very unhappy after his girlfriend's demise, but his marriage is fixed to a woman named Sandhya. Anand's mother has never seen her but she was recommended by her sister. On the wedding night, Anand is shocked to see that she resembles the woman he gave a lift to. He starts avoiding her. One day, he sees that she has painted the same bungalow in which he was called on that rainy night. Just after that, he hears her singing a part of "Naina Barse Rimjhim Rimjhim". Another evening, he sees an unmanned boat sailing in the lake and hears another part of "Naina Barse Rimjhim Rimjhim". Another night, the woman (Sandhya) visits Anand at his workplace and asks him to follow her to an isolated place, where she proceeds to sing a song (Lag Ja Gale se Phir). He is impressed and they sit in the car, where he has a sense of déjà vu as the wipers stop working and she can clearly see the way on the stormy and foggy night. He takes her to the bungalow and to the room where he had seen her dead and she disappears. When he reaches home, she is waiting for him and his mother says that she never left the house.

Anand is finally successful in persuading his mother to let Sandhya go back to her home by train. The next day, he learns that the train was in an accident, but he had seen Sandhya on the terrace that same night. All these happenings take a toll on his mental health and he is advised to take rest in Shimla. There, he meets a monk on a hilltop who tells him that 100 years ago at this very spot, a boy and a girl were romancing when the girl fell and died. Since then, her spirit has been roaming, waiting for her lover to return, who has been reborn as Anand. Anand then sees Sandhya far down the hillside and she sings the last part of "Naina Barse Rimjhim Rimjhim". Persuaded, Anand jumps but is saved by Lata.

Later, when Anand sees Sandhya trying to lure him out, he follows her to the same old bungalow, where he sees Sandhya on the stairway in one moment and then impossibly beside him in the next. She lures him to the terrace, where suddenly he sees a duplicate of Sandhya who came running out of a room in the house. The duplicate shouts that she is the real Sandhya but she is taken away. Strengthened by this sudden revelation, Anand realises this woman on the roof is not a ghost and confronts her, but she accidentally falls down and dies. Ramesh, Anand's cousin, reveals that he orchestrated all the eerie events so that Anand is termed mentally unstable and that his entire inheritance would pass to the next of kin i.e., Ramesh. A duel follows with the henchmen of Ramesh joining to kill Anand but the police arrive and arrest the perpetrators.

The superintendent of police reveals the details of how the previous acts had been staged with the policeman, the monk, and the 'servant' Madhav and tells the story of the other woman who was Sandhya's twin, whose existence was unknown to Sandhya. Sandhya's parents had separated them 18 years ago when her mother took away the other girl. Her mother died, and she was forced to adopt unfair means to earn a living. Her father learned of her after 16 years but he could not tell Sandhya about her identical twin out of shame. Ramesh learned of this twin sister and he started his scheming. The "Sandhya" who had lured him in the hospital, the woman he had met by the road, the dead woman in the mansion, and the woman in white in Shimla were all acts by Sandhya's twin. This explains the entire story and Sandhya's simultaneous presence in two places. Thus, the mystery is solved and Sandhya and Anand reunite.

== Cast ==
- Sadhana as Sandhya / Sandhya's twin sister
- Manoj Kumar as Dr. Anand
- Helen as Seema, Anand's girlfriend
- Ratnamala as Dr. Anand's mother
- Prem Chopra as Ramesh, Anand's distant cousin
- Parveen Choudhary as Dr. Lata, a coworker of Anand
- K. N. Singh as Dr Singh, Anand's boss and Lata's father
- Mohan Choti as Sher Singh, servant of the Simla quarters
- Dhumal (actor) as Madhav, the new servant in Anand's home
- Indira Bansal as Rosy
- Raj Mehra as Police Superintendent
- Anwari Bai as Old lady in old bungalow
- Pal Sharma as the monk in Shimla

== Music ==
Woh Kaun Thi?

Soundtrack album by Madan Mohan
- Released: 1964
- Genres: Film soundtrack; Bollywood
- Length: 24:20
- Language: Hindi
- Label: Saregama

Madan Mohan chronology
Suhagan (1964)	Woh Kaun Thi? (1964)	Bombay Race Course (1965)

The music was nominated for the Filmfare award that year. The lyrics of the songs were written by Raja Mehdi Ali Khan.

Song	Singer	Raga
"Lag Jaa Gale"	Lata Mangeshkar	Pahadi
"Aap Kyun Roye"	Lata Mangeshkar	
"Naina Barse Rimjhim"	Lata Mangeshkar	
"Chhodkar Tera Pyar Ka Daman"	Lata Mangeshkar & Mahendra Kapoor	
"Shokh Nazar Ki Bijliyan"	Asha Bhosle	
"Tiki Riki Tiki Riki Takori, Tiki Riki Tiki Riki Tum"	Mohammed Rafi &Asha Bhosle	

== Awards and nominations ==
=== Won ===
- Filmfare Award for Best Cinematographer for Black & White Film- K.H. Kapadia

=== Nominated ===
- Filmfare Award for Best Actress- Sadhana
- Filmfare Award for Best Music Director- Madan Mohan

== Remakes ==
In 1966, the film was remade in Telugu as Aame Evaru? and in Tamil as Yaar Nee?.
