= Sadhana Shivdasani =

Indian actress (1941–2015)

- Sadhana in 1964
- Born: 2 September 1941; Karachi, Sind, British India (present-day Sindh, Pakistan)
- Died: 25 December 2015 (aged 74); Mumbai, Maharashtra, India
- Monuments: Sadhna Pass
- Other name: The Mystery Girl
- Education: Jai Hind College (B.A.)
- Occupation: Actress
- Years active: 1958–1981
- Spouse: R. K. Nayyar (m. 1966; died 1995)
- Parents: Shivram Shivdasani (father); Lali Devi (mother)
- Relatives: See Shivdasani family
- Awards: IIFA Lifetime Achievement Award 2002, Posthumous honor in Sindhi Film Festival, 2016.

Signature
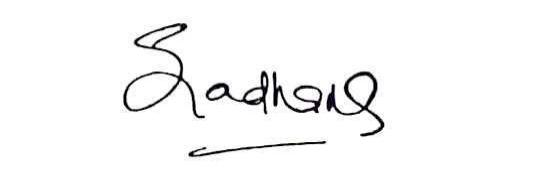

Sadhana Shivdasani (2 September 1941 – 25 December 2015), known mononymously as Sadhana, was an Indian actress who worked primarily in Hindi films. Regarded as one of the finest actresses from the Golden Age of Hindi Cinema, she was recognised for her exquisite beauty, understated acting style and distinctive screen presence. She was also regarded as one of the earliest female style icons of Hindi cinema, having popularised several fashion trends during the 1960s, including the hairstyle that came to be known as the “Sadhana Cut” and the fitted salwar kameez she wore in Waqt.

Sadhana rose to prominence as one of the leading actresses of the 1960s, appearing in a diverse range of romantic, dramatic, musical and suspense films. Her notable films of the decade included Love in Simla (1960), Hum Dono (1961), Asli-Naqli (1962), Mere Mehboob (1963), Woh Kaun Thi? (1964), Waqt (1965), Mera Saaya (1966) and Intaquam (1969).

Her collaborations with director Raj Khosla in the suspense films Woh Kaun Thi?, Mera Saaya and Anita led to her being popularly known as the “Mystery Girl”.

Sadhana also achieved a substantial following outside India. During visits to Europe and Africa, she was greeted by large crowds of admirers; in London, a prominent magazine dubbed her the “Dramatic Actress of the East” and compared her with Elizabeth Taylor, while her visit to Nairobi was marked by crowds of cheering fans along the route from the airport to her hotel.

She also participated in national causes, joining fellow film personalities in collecting donations for the National Defence Fund in Bombay in 1963. In 1965. She visited the Indian Army troop stationed at the Nastachun Pass, Kashmir in the year 1965, in order to boost their morale, following the Indo-Pak War. This place was later renamed as Sadhana Pass in her honour. She further contributed to the Chelmsford Defence Fund later that year.

She began her screen career as a child performer in Shree 420 (1955) and made her film debut in the Sindhi film Abana (1958). Her breakthrough as a leading actress came with Love in Simla (1960). She was credited as the director of her final film, Geeta Mera Naam (1974), in which she also starred. After a career spanning nearly two decades, she largely withdrew from the film industry during the 1970s.

Sadhana received Filmfare Award nominations for Woh Kaun Thi? and Waqt and was honoured with the IIFA Lifetime Achievement Award in 2002. She was also posthumously honoured by the Sindhi community at the Sindhi Film Festival and Award Ceremony in Delhi, in recognition of her contribution to Indian cinema and Sindhi cultural heritage. Her films, acting style and influence on fashion have continued to feature in retrospectives of Hindi cinema and popular culture.

== Early life ==
Sadhana Shivdasani was born on 2 September 1941 in Karachi, then part of British India, into a Sindhi Hindu family. Her name was initially Anjali, before her father, Shivram Shivdasani, changed it to Sadhana after his favourite Bengali actress and dancer, Sadhana Bose. Shivram was the elder brother of actor Hari Shivdasani, making actress Babita her first cousin.

Following the Partition of India in 1947, the Shivdasani family left Karachi and migrated to India. Sadhana later recalled travelling with her parents and elder sister Sarla through Delhi, Benaras and Calcutta before the family settled in Bombay (now Mumbai) in 1950. She recalled that her father had been a prosperous zamindar in Karachi but that the family had to start over in Bombay. After a brief stay with an aunt in Colaba, they moved to Sion, where they lived in housing built for refugees.

As the family moved frequently during this period, Sadhana was initially educated at home by her mother, Lali, who had trained as a Montessori teacher. She subsequently entered the fifth standard at Auxilium Convent School in Wadala. Sindhi was spoken at home, and Sadhana later recalled having difficulty communicating with other children when she first entered school. She described herself as somewhat introverted during her school years.

Sadhana developed an interest in Hindi cinema during her childhood and admired actors including Dev Anand and Nutan. She later recalled that she had decided while still at school that she wanted to become an actress after completing her education. She attended Jai Hind College, where she participated in college plays. As her family was experiencing financial difficulties, she worked as a typist in Colaba to help support them, attending college in the mornings and working in the afternoons.

Her participation in a college play eventually brought her to the attention of the producers of the Sindhi film Abana (1958), in which she appeared alongside Sheila Ramani. An advertisement for Abana published in Screen subsequently attracted the attention of film producer Sashadhar Mukherjee. He offered Sadhana an opportunity to enter Hindi cinema and enrolled her in his acting school, where she trained alongside Joy Mukherjee. This led to her being cast in Love in Simla (1960), her first leading role in Hindi cinema.

== Career ==
=== Early career ===
Sadhana aspired to be an actress since childhood. In 1955, she played a chorus girl in the song "Mud mud ke na dekh mud mud ke" in Raj Kapoor's Shree 420. When she was 15 years old, she was approached by some producers who had seen her act in a college play. They cast her in India's first Sindhi film titled Abaana (1958), where she played the role of Sheila Ramani's younger sister. She was paid Re 1 for this movie.

A photograph of her taken during the promotional shoot for the film Abaana (1958) appeared in the movie magazine Screen. It was then that Sashadhar Mukherjee, one of Hindi cinema's leading producers at that time, noticed her. She joined Mukherjee's acting school along with her debutant co-star Joy Mukherjee, Sashadhar's son. Ram Krishna Nayyar (R. K. Nayyar), who had previously worked as assistant director on a few films, directed this film. He also created her trademark look, called the Sadhana cut, inspired by Hollywood actress Audrey Hepburn. The Filmalaya Production banner thus introduced Joy, Sadhana and her iconic hairstyle in their 1960 romantic film Love in Simla. The film was declared a hit at the box office and was listed in the top 10 films of 1960. During this period she would again work under the same banner opposite Joy in Ek Musafir Ek Haseena.

=== Stardom ===
Besides Love in Simla, Sadhana was signed by acclaimed director Bimal Roy for his satirical film on Indian democracy; Parakh. She portrayed a simple village girl in this multi-award-winning film. The film was a semi hit at box office and is known for the song "O Sajna Barkha Bahar Aai" sung by Lata Mangeshkar. In 1961's other hit, Hum Dono, she played the love interest of Dev Anand. This black-and-white film was colourized and re-released in 2011. Rediff.com in the film's review writes about Sadhana: "Her eyes, expressive and captivating, do most of the work, while she balances out her submissiveness with a firm tongue." The duet "Abhi na jaao chhodkar" from the film Hum Dono is regarded as "the most romantic song" by actor Shah Rukh Khan and director Sanjay Leela Bhansali.

Author Amit Chaudhuri in an essay comparing cultures, says that Sadhana's curious expressions in the song denote listener's peculiar ecstasy while in other cinemas it would mean sex or love. In 1962, she was again paired with Dev Anand in Asli-Naqli by director Hrishikesh Mukherjee. The same year saw director-screenwriter Raj Khosla cast her opposite Joy in Ek Musafir Ek Hasina. Khosla would again work with Sadhana to make a suspense thriller trilogy.

In 1963, Sadhana played her first role in the Technicolor film; Mere Mehboob, directed by H. S. Rawail. The film was the blockbuster of 1963 and ranked in the top 5 films of the 1960s.

In 1964, she played a double role in the first of the suspense-thriller trilogy; Woh Kaun Thi? This white-sari-clad performance opposite Manoj Kumar earned her first Filmfare nomination as Best Actress. Through this role she got to be part of Lata Mangeshkar – Madan Mohan’s songs "Naina barse" and "Lag ja gale". Rediff.com called her a show-stopper "with an intriguing Mona Lisa-like smile". The film was a box office hit. Raj Khosla cast her in two more successful mystery films; Mera Saaya (1966) and Anita (1967) thus making her famous as the "Mystery girl". Mera Saaya, a box office Superhit, a courtroom drama film, again saw her playing a double role, now opposite Sunil Dutt. The song "Jhumka gira re" sung by Asha Bhosle and composed by Madan Mohan saw Sadhana perform dance steps choreographed by Saroj Khan. Khan was then an assistant to dance director B. Sohanlal. The song became so popular that excited audience in cinema halls used to throw coins at the screen, and is one of the most requested songs on the radio.

Sadhana got her second Filmfare nomination as Best Actress for the role of Meena, in Yash Chopra's directorial saga Waqt (1965). She stood out in Bollywood’s first ever ensemble cast by bringing out the fashion of tight churidar-kurtas. The film proved to be 1965's "blockbuster hit". Her other notable works in the 1960s include performances in Rajkumar (1964), Dulha Dulhan (1964), Gaban (1966) and Budtameez (1966).

=== End of acting career ===
Sadhana had health issues due to her thyroid, which she got treated in Boston. After returning from the US, she starred in the successful movies Intaquam (1969), Ek Phool Do Mali (1969), Aap Aye Bahaar Ayee (1971), Ishq Par Zor Nahin (1970), Dil Daulat Duniya (1972) and Geeta Mera Naam (1974).

In Intaquam she played the role of a woman who revengefully lures the son of her own boss who cheated her, to be put behind the bars for a crime he did not commit. In 1974, her directorial venture Geeta Mera Naam was released. Produced by her husband, the film had herself playing the lead actress along with Sunil Dutt and Feroz Khan. It was also Saroj Khan's first film as an independent dance director. The film did "above average" business at the box office. A non-lexical vocable from the song "Mujhe maar daalo" of this film appears in the song "People" which features in American rapper J Dilla's album Donuts (2006).

After that, she retired from acting, as she did not want to be cast as a side-actress or do character roles. Later, she and her husband formed a production company. She also produced the movie Pati Parmeshwar, starring Dimple Kapadia in 1989.

== Personal life ==
Sadhana married her Love in Simla director Ram Krishna Nayyar on 7 March 1966. Their love blossomed on the film set. But as she was very young then, her parents opposed it. They were married for nearly thirty years, until his death in 1995 from asthma. The couple had no children. In 2013, she stated that she doesn't keep in touch with her first cousin Babita but does keep in touch with actresses such as Asha Parekh, Waheeda Rehman, Nanda, Shammi and Helen.

She suffered from eye problems due to hyperthyroidism. After her retirement from acting, she refused to be photographed. Living in Santacruz, Mumbai, she rented an apartment building owned by singer Asha Bhosle.

== Legacy ==
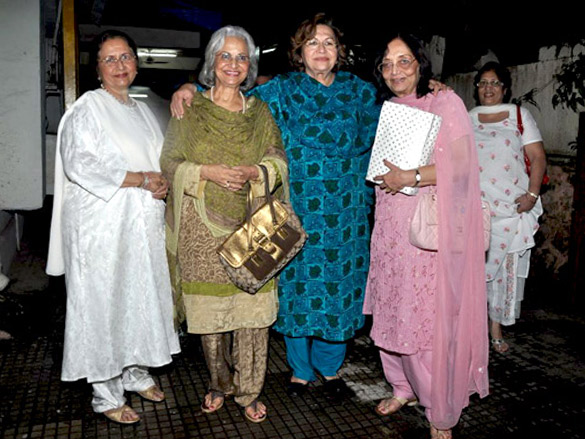
Sadhana (first from right) with Helen, Waheeda Rehman and Nanda in 2010

Sadhana is regarded as one of the remarkable actors of Hindi cinema. In 2011, Rediff.com listed her as the eighth-greatest actress of all-time. In 2022, she was placed in Outlook India's "75 Best Bollywood Actresses" list. One of the highest paid actress of the 1960s, Sadhana appeared in Box Office India's "Top Actresses" list five times from 1962 to 1966 and topped twice (1965-1966).

=== Fashion icon ===
Sadhana introduced the fringe hairstyle in the Indian film industry in her first film Love in Simla. R. K. Nayyar, director of the film and her future husband, suggested the fringe style in order to make her forehead look narrower. Sadhana says: "They tried to stick a strip near the hair-line, but it didn’t work out." Nayyar then suggested she go for the fringe style as was then sported by the Hollywood actress Audrey Hepburn. The fringe soon became popular and a fashion fad in the 1960s. The style was copied by girls in India and is still known by the same name. The look suited the role of naughty, pretty, glamorous Sonia that she played. But when Sadhana went on the shoot for Bimal Roy's Parakh, Roy was disappointed to see her modern look. She had to stick her fringe back in order to match the simple village girl she played here. In 1963, when she signed to play a role of a simple Muslim girl from Aligarh in Mere Mehboob, Sadhana undid her famous "Sadhana cut" to fit the bill. She had centre-parted her hair and wore it in a plait, which was immediately discarded by the director H.S. Rawail. He said that the audience wanted to see her signature "Sadhana cut" and demanded it. Many years later, the Bollywood actress Deepika Padukone sported the same fringe in her films Om Shanti Om (2007) and Chandni Chowk To China (2009). Sadhana is also credited with bringing into fashion the tight churidar-kurta. She went with this concept of gracefully changing the traditional loose salwar kameez to her director Yash Chopra for the 1965 film Waqt. Chopra felt insecure and thought that it would not be accepted. But Sadhana, with the help of her fashion designer Bhanu Athaiya showed him a sample, which he liked. The trend lasted well into the 1970s and can be seen, adopted by many actresses.

In a song sequence of "Phir Milenge Chalte Chalte" for Rab Ne Bana Di Jodi (2008), actress Bipasha Basu dressed herself in a white churidar-kurta and also frolicked with the famous fringe as a tribute to Sadhana. In 2014, Sadhana made a rare public appearance walking the ramp in a pink sari at a fashion show to support the cause for cancer and AIDS patients. She was escorted by her relative, actor Ranbir Kapoor.

== Death ==
During her later years, Sadhana was involved in court cases and suffered from illness. She had undergone an emergency surgery due to a bleeding oral lesion in December 2014 at the K J Somaiya Medical College.

Sadhana died on 25 December 2015 in Hinduja Hospital, Mumbai after being hospitalised with high fever. The illness she briefly suffered from was officially undisclosed. However, India Today reported she died of cancer.

Sadhana was cremated at Oshiwara crematorium in Mumbai, Maharashtra. Bollywood stars such Anushka Sharma, Karan Johar, Madhur Bhandarkar, Lata Mangeshkar and several others expressed their sorrow at the loss.

== Filmography ==
Year	Title	Role	Notes	Ref.
1955	Shree 420	Chorus girl	Uncredited brief appearance in song "Mud Mud Ke Na Dekh"	
1958	Talaq	Shepherd dancer-singer girl	Uncredited brief appearance in song "Mere Jeevan Mein Kiran Banake" lip-syncing to Asha Bhosle's vocals	
1958	Abana		Sindhi film	
1960	Love in Simla	Sonia	Debut as lead	
1960	Parakh	Seema		
1961	Hum Dono	Mita		
1962	Prem Patra	Kavita Kapoor		
1962	Man Mauji	Rani		
1962	Ek Musafir Ek Hasina	Asha		
1962	Asli-Naqli	Renu		
1963	Mere Mehboob	Husna Banu Changezi		
1964	Woh Kaun Thi?	Sandhya and Sandhya's twin	Double role	
1964	Rajkumar	Princess Sangeeta		
1964	Picnic		Unreleased	
1964	Dulha Dulhan	Rekha alias Chanda		
1965	Waqt	Meena Mittal		
1965	Arzoo	Usha		
1966	Mera Saaya	Geeta and Raina alias Nisha	Double role	
1966	Gaban	Jalpa		
1966	Budtameez	Shanta		
1967	Anita	Anita alias Maya		
1969	Sachaai	Shobha Dayal		
1969	Intaquam	Reeta Mehra		
1969	Ek Phool Do Mali	Somna		
1970	Ishq Par Zor Nahin	Sushma Rai		
1971	Aap Aye Bahaar Ayee	Neena Bakshi		
1972	Dil Daulat Duniya	Roopa		
1973	Hum Sub Chor Hain		Special appearance	
1974	Geeta Mera Naam	Kavita / Neeta / Geeta	Double role; also director	
1974	Chhote Sarkar	Radhika		
1975	Vandana	Rekha		
1977	Amaanat	Suchitra		
1981	Mehfil	Shalini and Ratnabai	Double role	
1994	Ulfat Ki Nayee Manzeelein	Sadhana	Final film / Delayed release	

== Accolades ==
Year	Award	Category	Film	Result	Ref.
1965	Filmfare Awards	Best Actress	Woh Kaun Thi?	Nominated	
1966	Filmfare Awards	Best Actress	Waqt	Nominated	
2002	IIFA Awards	Lifetime Achievement Award	—N/a	Won	
