= Anand family =

Influential family in Indian cinema

- Current region: Mumbai, Maharashtra, India
- Traditions: Indian Punjabi Hindus
- Heirlooms: Navketan Films

Anand family, or the Anand–Sahni family, is an Indian show business family active in Hindi cinema (Bollywood). It originates from the Anand brothers: Chetan Anand, Dev Anand and Vijay Anand. Their father's name was Pishorimal Anand. The Anand brothers had five sisters: Savitri, Sheila, Kanta, Lata and Usha.

In a film industry dominated by familial connections the Anand brothers served as an important bridge between various Bollywood film clans.

== Background ==
The Anand Family is a prominent Indian film family, known for its contributions to Bollywood through acting, directing, and filmmaking. The family originally hails from Gurdaspur, Punjab, India. The Anand family has had a lasting impact on Indian cinema, influencing storytelling, acting styles, and filmmaking techniques across generations. Navketan Films Founded by Chetan and Dev Anand in 1949, this production house has produced some of Indian cinema's most iconic films.

== Chetan Anand ==
In 1943, Chetan Anand married actress Uma Anand, a Bengali Christian woman of Brahmin heritage. Uma's father, Gyanesh Chandra Chatterji, was the principal of Government Law College, Lahore, and he was the son of Rev. Probhat Chandra Chatterji, a Christian priest. Uma's mother, Ila Chatterji, was a first cousin of Mona Singha, better known as Kalpana Kartik, wife of Chetan's younger brother Dev Anand. He has two sons Ketan Anand and Vivek Anand.

== Dev Anand ==
Dev Anand was an Indian actor, writer, director and producer known for his work in Hindi cinema. Anand is considered as one of the greatest and most successful actors in the history of Indian cinema. He was the most famous among all his brothers. Dev Anand marry Kalpana Kartik in 1954. Both of them got married in a very private manner during the shooting of the film Taxi Driver (1954). They have 2 children, Suneil Anand and Devina Anand.

== Vijay Anand ==
Vijay Anand was the younger brother of legendary Bollywood actor Dev Anand and filmmaker Chetan Anand. He belonged to a family deeply rooted in cinema. His eldest brother, Chetan Anand, was a pioneering director, while Dev Anand became one of Bollywood's biggest superstars. Their family hailed from Gurdaspur, Punjab. Vijay was one of Bollywood's most talented directors, known for his stylish storytelling, brilliant cinematography, and gripping screenplay writing. His films are remembered for their engaging plots and timeless songs. He made his directorial debut with Nau Do Gyarah (1957) and went on to direct several classics, including: Guide (1965), Jewel Thief (1967), Johny Mera Naam (1970), Tere Mere Sapne (1971).

Vijay Anand was also a talented actor. His most famous acting role was in Kora Kagaz (1974) opposite Jaya Bachchan. His performance as a troubled husband won critical acclaim.

=== Later life and legacy ===
Vijay Anand was appointed the chairman of the Central Board of Film Certification (CBFC) in 2001 but resigned after a short tenure due to creative differences. His filmmaking style was known for its intricate storytelling, suspense, and soulful music, often composed by legends like S. D. Burman and R. D. Burman.

== See also ==
- List of Indian film families
