= Romancing with Life =

Autobiography by Dev Anand

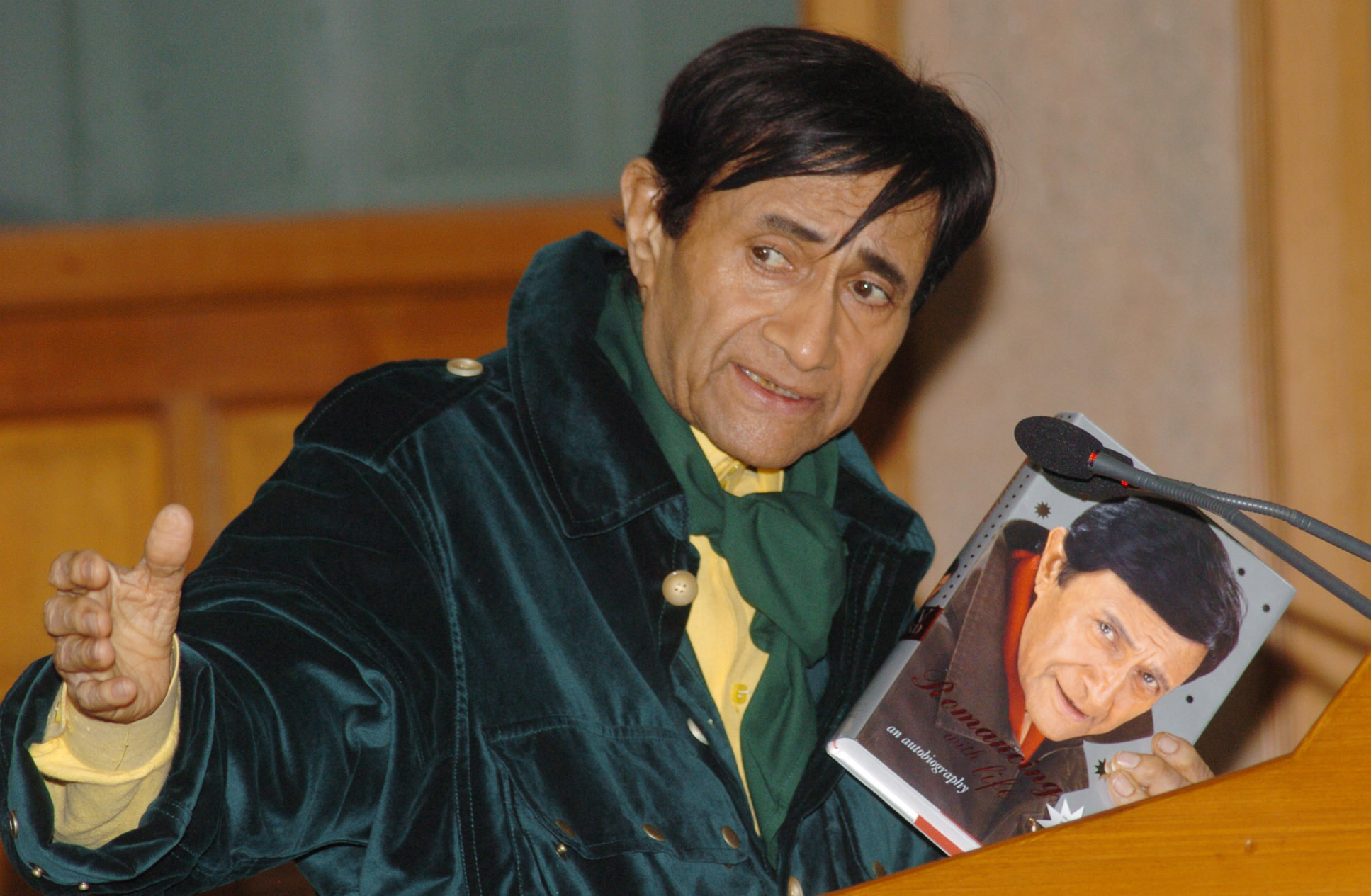
- Anand at the Romancing with Life launch, 2007
- Author: Dev Anand
- Language: English
- Subject: Autobiography
- Genre: Autobiography, Memoir
- Published: 26 September 2007
- Publisher: Penguin Viking
- Publication place: India
- Media type: Print (Hardcover, Paperback)
- Pages: 438
- ISBN: 978-0-670-08124-0
- OCLC: 180773079

Romancing with Life is the autobiography of Indian actor and filmmaker Dev Anand, published in September 2007 by Penguin Viking. Written by the actor, the book details his personal life, his career in Hindi cinema, the founding of his production company Navketan Films, and his experiences spanning over six decades in the film industry. The book received positive reviews from critics, with praise focusing on its candid narrative style, documentation of the golden era of Hindi cinema, and the author's perspective on life.

A significant portion of the memoir addresses Dev Anand's active political stance and his direct opposition to the political climate during the Indian Emergency declared in 1975. In the book, he details how his conscience revolted against what he described as a dictatorial act and state censorship of the media and film industry. He chronicles his efforts in mobilizing fellow film personalities to protest against authoritarian governance, leading opposition rallies, and briefly floating his own political party to challenge the ruling establishment and restore democratic freedom.

== Summary ==
The book begins with Dev Anand detailing his early life and origins, including his birth in Gurdaspur and his formative years in pre-partition Punjab. It covers his move to Bombay in 1943 with limited financial resources to pursue a career in acting, his initial struggles in the city, and his entry into the Hindi film industry.

The memoir later details the establishment of his production banner, Navketan Films, founded in 1949 alongside his brother Chetan Anand, and their contributions to Indian cinema. It discusses his creative partnerships with his brother and director Vijay Anand, music composer S. D. Burman, and lyricist Sahir Ludhianvi during the golden era of Hindi cinema.

The book documents the behind-the-scenes accounts of landmark cinematic ventures under the Navketan banner, such as CID, Taxi Driver, Kala Pani, Guide, and Jewel Thief. It also highlights his professional associations with prominent co-stars and directors, along with his personal relationships and experiences spanning over six decades in the film industry.

== Development and writing ==
Dev Anand conceived the idea of writing his autobiography to document his personal experiences and cinematic journey spanning over six decades without the assistance of a ghostwriter. According to interviews and publisher notes, the actor began writing the memoir by hand, refusing to use a computer to ensure his raw narrative style remained unaltered.

The manuscript compilation involved gathering archival material, photographs, and personal reflections from his upbringing in pre-partition Punjab through his arrival in Bombay in 1943. The writing process captured his optimistic philosophy of life, detailing the establishment of Navketan Films in 1949 alongside his brother Chetan Anand and their subsequent cinematic ventures.

== Publication and launch ==
The autobiography was officially launched on 26 September 2007 in New Delhi by the then Prime Minister of India, Manmohan Singh, in the presence of UPA Chairperson Sonia Gandhi. The launch event received widespread media attention, coinciding with the eve of Dev Anand's 84th birthday.

== Critical reception ==
Romancing with Life received generally favorable reviews from literary critics, mainstream reviewers, and film historians upon publication. Reviewers commended its pacy, effervescent narrative style, nostalgic documentation of the golden era of Hindi cinema, and the author's relentless enthusiasm for life. The high-profile book launch, attended by political figures including Prime Minister Manmohan Singh and Sonia Gandhi, garnered extensive national media coverage and widespread critical commentary regarding its candid nature. However, some literary reviewers noted that certain complex personal controversies and professional setbacks were addressed with diplomatic restraint.

== Publication history ==
Region	Release date	Language	Format	Publisher	Ref.
India	26 September 2007	English	Hardcover	Penguin Viking	
India	2007–2008	English	Paperback	Penguin Viking	
India	2007–2008	English	Amazon Kindle	Penguin Viking	
United Kingdom	2007	English	Hardcover	Penguin Books	

== Sources ==
- Dev Anand (26 September 2007). Romancing with Life. New Delhi, India: Penguin Viking. ISBN 978-0-670-08124-0.
- Manuel, Mark (12 September 2007). "Dev Anand is 'Romancing With Life'". The Times of India.
- "PM launches Dev Anand's autobiography". Hindustan Times. 26 September 2007.
- "'Mad in love' Dev Anand was heartbroken when he saw Raj Kapoor hugging Zeenat Aman". The Indian Express. 22 January 2026.
- "Romancing With Life ! Jab I met Dev Anand…". Star of Mysore. 3 December 2022.
- Sahu, S. N. (26 September 2023). "The King Of Romance". The Citizen.
- "When Dev Anand was mistaken for a taxi driver". Scroll.in. 26 September 2023.
- "'My conscience revolted at this dictatorial act': Dev Anand on Emergency crackdown". ThePrint. 26 May 2025.
- "Dev Anand, Chetan Anand and Doon School". DailyO. 19 July 2018.
- "Romancing the self". Himal Southasian. 15 December 2021.
