= Kalpana Kartik =

Indian film actress

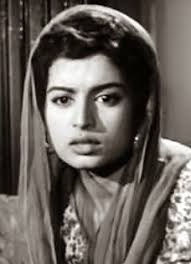
- Born: Mona Singha; 19 August 1931 (age 95); Lahore, Punjab, British India (present-day Punjab, Pakistan)
- Occupations: Actress, Associate Film Producer
- Years active: 1951–1957 (as an actress); 1963 – 1976 (as an associate producer)
- Spouse: Dev Anand (m. 1954; died 2011)
- Children: 2; including Suneil Anand

Kalpana Kartik (born as Mona Singha on 19 August 1931) is a retired Hindi film actress. She starred in six films in the 1950s. She is the wife of late Hindi film actor, producer and director Dev Anand.

Mona Singha was a beauty queen while studying at St. Bede's College, Shimla. She was introduced to films by Chetan Anand of Navketan Films with the film Baazi in 1951. She co-starred with Dev Anand, whom she worked with in all her subsequent films. Her screen name – Kalpana Kartik – was given to her by Chetan Anand during this period. Her other films were Aandhiyan (1952), Humsafar (1953), Taxi Driver (1954), House No. 44 (1955) and Nau Do Gyarah (1957).

== Career ==
Kartik was born as Mona Singha in a Punjabi Christian family in Lahore. Her father was a Tehsildar of Batala in Gurdaspur District and she was the youngest of five brothers and two sisters. After the partition, her family moved to Shimla.

She was a student of the St. Bede's College, Shimla. In her graduation year, she won the Ms. Shimla contest and was noticed by Chetan Anand, a film-maker from Bombay. He was there with his wife Uma Anand, whose mother is Mona's cousin. He convinced her family to allow her to join his fledgling film company, Navketan Films, as a leading lady. Thus, Mona Singha was re-christened Kalpana Kartik and she moved to Bombay (now known as Mumbai). Her first film Baazi was a huge success and went on to become a landmark in Indian cinema.

She then acted in Taxi Driver, which was the 'coming of age' film of the Navketan banner. It was Navketan's first super-success and also the film on whose sets Dev Anand secretly married Kalpana Kartik during a lunch break. Kalpana's time in Navketan saw four different directors take reign - Guru Dutt, Chetan Anand, S. D. Burman and Vijay Anand. Nau Do Gyarah was her last film as actress.

Kalpana Kartik worked as an associate producer for Tere Ghar Ke Samne (1963), Jewel Thief (1967), Prem Pujari (1970), Shareef Budmaash (1973), Heera Panna (1973), and Jaaneman (1976). Dev Anand played the lead role in these movies.

== Personal life ==
Mona Singha was born into a Punjabi Christian family in pre-partition India. Her father was a Tehsildar in Batala, and she was the youngest of seven siblings. After the partition, her family relocated to Shimla, where she attended St. Bede's College and earned the title of Miss Shimla, marking the beginning of her journey to fame. In 1954, Mona and Dev Anand got married secretly while on a break during the shooting of Taxi Driver. They had two children, a son Suneil Anand (30 June 1956 - 26 July 2026) and a daughter Devina Anand. After Nau Do Gyarah, Kalpana quit films to become a home maker though she turned an associate producer of a few films all starring her husband Dev Anand. After her marriage, she chose to stay away from the limelight and has been away from the media since then.

== Filmography ==
=== As an actress ===
Year	Film	Character
1951	Baazi	Dr. Rajni
1952	Aandhiyan	Janki
1953	Humsafar	Malti
1954	Taxi Driver	Mala
1955	House No. 44	Nimmo
1957	Nau Do Gyarah	Raksha

=== As an associate producer ===
Year	Movie
1963	Tere Ghar Ke Samne
1967	Jewel Thief
1970	Prem Pujari
1973	Shareef Budmaash
1973	Heera Panna
1976	Jaaneman
