= Rashid Khan (actor) =

Indian character actor (1915–1972)

Rashid Khan (5 July 1915 - 1972) was an Indian character actor. He made his acting debut in the 1946 film Dharti Ke Lal and appeared in more than sixty films between 1946 and 1974. He frequently appeared with Dev Anand in films including Afsar, Anand's first production from his company Navketan Films and went on to work with him in hits like Baazi, Taxi Driver, Tere Ghar Ke Samne, Bombai Ka Babu and Kala Bazaar, in which he played key roles. They worked together till the 1973 film Banarasi Babu.

He also acted opposite most of the famous actors from the 1950s through to the early 1970s including Raj Kapoor, Shammi Kapoor, Dharmendra, Rajesh Khanna and Amitabh Bachchan. He was cast in versatile roles such as a father, the hero's sidekick, the side villain and the comic relief.

He died in 1972 at the age of 56/57 and several of his films released after his death until 1974.

== Selected filmography ==
Film
Year	Title	Role	Notes
1946	Dharti Ke Lal		
1950	Afsar		
1951	Nadaan		
1951	Baazi		
1954	Munna		
1954	Taxi Driver		
1955	Shree 420		
1955	House No. 44		
1955	Garam Coat		
1955	Yasmin		
1957	Nau Do Gyarah		
1957	Kala Pani		
1960	Kala Bazar		
1960	Bombai Ka Babu		
1961	Hum Dono		
1962	Professor		
1963	Shehar Aur Sapna		
1963	Tere Ghar Ke Samne		
1965	Guide		
1968	Duniya		
1968	Do Dooni Char		
1969	Prince		
1971	Gambler		
1971	Elaan		
1971	Pyar Ki Kahani		
1972	Ek Nazar		
1973	Banarasi Babu		
1973	Chhupa Rustam		
