= Humsafar (1953 film) =

- Directed by: A. N. Bannerjee
- Produced by: Navketan Films
- Starring: Kalpana Kartik; Dev Anand; Johnny Walker; Chetan Anand
- Release date: 1953
- Country: India
- Language: Hindi

Humsfar is a 1953 Indian Hindi-language film directed by A. N. Bannerjee. The film was produced under the banner of Navketan Films and starred Kalpana Kartik, Dev Anand, Johnny Walker, and Chetan Anand.

Humsafar was released in Bombay on 31 July 1953. It was described as having a "topical theme" in a Times of India review. According to film historian Anirudha Bhattacharjee, Humsafar was a financial failure and "resulted in pushing the studio [Navketan] to near bankruptcy".
