= Tere Ghar Ke Samne =

- Poster of Tere Ghar Ke Samne
- Directed by: Vijay Anand
- Written by: Vijay Anand
- Produced by: Dev Anand
- Starring: Dev Anand; Nutan; Rajendra Nath; Om Prakash; Harindranath Chattopadhyay
- Cinematography: V Ratra
- Edited by: Babu Shaikh
- Music by: S. D. Burman
- Release date: 5 April 1963
- Running time: 149 minutes
- Country: India
- Language: Hindi
- Box office: ₹2 crore

Tere Ghar Ke Samne (English: In Front of Your House) is a 1963 Indian Hindi-language romantic comedy film written and directed by Vijay Anand. Produced by Dev Anand under the banner of Navketan Films, the film is loosely based on the 1954 film Bengali film Ora Thake Odhare. It stars Anand himself alongside Nutan in lead roles, while Rajendra Nath, Om Prakash and Harindranath Chattopadhyay play other pivotal roles. The film's music is by S. D. Burman, while the lyrics have been penned by Hasrat Jaipuri.

The story is about a young architect who returns to India after having had a western education and falls in love with a modern Indian girl, who respects Indian culture and her parents' wishes. Their fathers are rivals in everything, and never cease to quarrel. The two of them must convince their fathers to put aside their differences and live together in harmony.

Released on 5 April 1963, it was a major hit in India, taking the sixth spot in highest-grossing films of the year. The film, produced by Dev Anand and, is the duo's fourth collaboration after the hits Nau Do Gyarah (1957), Kala Bazar (1960) and Hum Dono (1961). Vijay Anand would later go on to direct the hits Guide (1965), Teesri Manzil (1966) and Johny Mera Naam (1970). It was also the last movie to pair Dev Anand and Nutan together, after the films Paying Guest (1957), Baarish (1957) and Manzil (1960).

== Plot ==
Set in Delhi, Lala Jagannath (Om Prakash) and Seth Karam Chand (Harindranath Chattopadhyay), two wealthy businessmen, are bidding for the front plot in a government auction. One is westernised and wears black-rimmed spectacles, the other, traditional turban and linen. Adamant on getting the front plot of land, Lala Jagannath raises the price higher and higher. Seth Karam Chand irks him even further by raising the price by a paltry 1000 rupees, made worse by the fact that Seth Karam Chand raises his finger, leaving the auctioneer (Jankidas) and the crowd to interpret the meaning. Lala Jagannath winds up with the front plot, but at the last moment, Seth Karam Chand comes in and quotes an insane price for the back plot, leaving the rest to think something has gone wrong with him.

Back home, Seth Karam Chand informs his wife about his decision, and the two banter, with him talking about "style". His daughter, Sulekha (Nutan) points out that their house will be hidden by Lala Jagannath's one. Not willing to let such a thing happen, Seth Karam Chand and Sulekha hire an architect, Rakesh (Dev Anand). After a little friction and misunderstanding, Rakesh gets to know Sulekha and her brother, Ranjit. (Rajendra Nath). His sidekick, Madan, (Rashid Khan), sets his eyes on Sulekha's friend, Motiya (Parveen Choudhary).

They go to visit the Qutub Minar, and no one else but Rakesh and Sulekha are willing to climb up. Slowly, but surely, Rakesh and Sulekha start to fall in love. But there's a catch that no one but Rakesh and Madan know – Rakesh is actually Lala Jagannath's son! Even then, he conceals the truth from everyone, leading to some hilarious side-splitting scenes where Rakesh tries to keep his parents away from Sulekha's, and his antics include pretending to have an attack and making both sides believe he's scolding the other, with a little help from his sidekick.

Meanwhile, Ranjit and Rakesh's colleague, Jenny (Zarine Katrak) fall in love as well. Ranjit leaves for Kashmir, and Rakesh starts to make the plans for the houses. To add to his woes, his father insists that he design the house, and Seth Karam Chand has already hired him. Still not willing to allow the truth to be revealed, he tries to keep the designs away from each side, but to no avail. His father sees a design, insists on it, while Seth Karam Chand has already decided on that one. Fed up with all the enmity, Rakesh eventually decides to make both houses the same. His love affair with Sulekha continues. When Sulekha goes off to Shimla, Rakesh follows behind her.

Finally deciding that enough is enough, Rakesh decides to reveal the truth to Sulekha. She gets very angry with him, but thankfully, their parents don't come to know about it. He refuses to work for them, and when she demands to know why, he drops a bombshell and tells her that he is indeed Lala Jagannath's son. Feeling betrayed, she starts to avoid him at Ronny's birthday party. Undaunted, Rakesh sings a song, and she is easily wooed back.

However, Lala Jagannath and Seth Karamchand both find out, and marriage, in their eyes, is impossible. Their enmity is a barrier between their children's love, and however hard Rakesh and Sulekha try, the barrier is impenetrable. Even then, Rakesh finally manages to convince them, and they relent, embracing each other. Taking that as a yes, Rakesh and Sulekha hug each other too, overjoyed. They get married at the inauguration of the two houses that Rakesh had built.

== Cast ==
- Dev Anand as Rakesh Anand Kumar, an architect who builds both houses
- Nutan as Sulekha, a young girl who falls in love with Rakesh
- Rajendra Nath as Captain Ranjit 'Ronny', an army officer and Sulekha's brother
- Zarine Katrak as Jenny, Rakesh's colleague
- Rashid Khan as Madan Gopal Basuriwala, Rakesh's assistant
- Parveen Choudhary as Motiya, Sulekha's friend
- Pratima Devi as Mrs. Karam Chand, Sulekha's mother
- Harindranath Chattopadhyay as Seth Karam Chand, Sulekha's father
- Mumtaz Begum as Mrs. Jagannath, Rakesh's mother
- Om Prakash as Lala Jagannath, Rakesh's father
- Jankidas as the auctioneer

== Music ==
Tere Ghar Ke Samne

Soundtrack album by Sachin Dev Burman
- Released: 1963 (India)
- Recorded: 1962
- Genre: Film soundtrack
- Length: 32:26
- Label: The Gramophone Company of India (Private) Limited
- Producer: Sachin Dev Burman

Sachin Dev Burman chronology
Naughty Boy (1962)	Tere Ghar Ke Samne (1963)	Bandini (1963)

Mohammed Rafi – Dil Ka Bhanwar
A sample of the song "Dil Ka Bhanwar" from the film soundtrack

The music was composed by S.D. Burman, and the lyrics were penned by Hasrat Jaipuri. Mohammed Rafi sang three solos for Dev Anand, and two more duets with Lata Mangeshkar. Asha Bhosle also sang one song, "Dil Ki Manzil", a cabaret song, which had a few lines of Spanish too.

=== Track list ===
No.	Title	Singer(s)	Length
1.	"Dil Ka Bhanwar"	Mohammed Rafi	4:37
2.	"Tere Ghar Ke Samne"	Mohammed Rafi, Lata Mangeshkar	3:19
3.	"Tu Kahan Yeh Bata"	Mohammed Rafi	4:26
4.	"Dekho Rootha Na Karo"	Mohammed Rafi, Lata Mangeshkar	3:46
5.	"Dil Ki Manzil"	Asha Bhosle	5:10
6.	"Yeh Tanhai Hai Re Hai"	Lata Mangeshkar	3:38
7.	"Sunle Tu Dilki Sadaa"	Mohammed Rafi	4:46
