= Navketan Films =

Former film production company which was based in Mumbai, India

- Type: Privately held company
- Founded: 1949; 77 years ago
- Founder: Dev Anand; Chetan Anand (director)
- Headquarters: Mumbai, India
- Key people: Dev Anand; Chetan Anand (director); Suneil Anand
- Products: Film
- Divisions: Production; Distribution; Studio; Marketing; Merchandising; Licensing; Home Video; Music; Digital; Talent; Brand Partnerships; Communications; Technical; Visual Effects

Navketan Films is a film production house based in Mumbai, India. Started in 1949 by actor-director and producer Dev Anand and his elder brother Chetan Anand, whose debut film, Neecha Nagar, received the Palme d'Or (Best Film) award, at the first ever Cannes Film Festival in 1946. Their younger brother Vijay Anand, also directed numerous films for the company, like Guide (1965), and Jewel Thief (1967). Chetan and Vijay parted ways with the company later and Dev's son Suneil Anand is currently heading the production house. The last film released by Navketan Films was Chargesheet in 2011. Navketan’s latest venture is a Hollywood film titled Vagator Mixer (2023) which is being directed by Suneil Anand. It stars Suneil in the lead with a host of Hollywood actors.

== Filmography ==
Year	Film	Director	Notes
1950	Afsar	Chetan Anand	First Film
1951	Baazi	Guru Dutt	
1952	Aandhiyan	Chetan Anand	
1953	Humsafar	A N Bannerjee	
1954	Taxi Driver	Chetan Anand	
1955	House No. 44	M K Burman	
1956	Funtoosh	Chetan Anand	
1957	Nau Do Gyarah	Vijay Anand	
1958	Kala Pani	Raj Khosla	
1960	Kala Bazar	Vijay Anand	
1961	Hum Dono	Amarjeet	India's entry for the Berlin International Film Festival, In 2011 coloured version came
1963	Tere Ghar Ke Samne	Vijay Anand	
1965	Guide	Vijay Anand	Dev Anand co-produced English version of the film with the American Nobel Laureate Pearl S. Buck; First Indian Movie Classic ever to be selected by the Cannes Committee to be showcased in ‘Cannes Classics’ at the Festival de Cannes in 2008.; Indian entry for Oscar; Won Filmfare awards in six categories
1967	Jewel Thief	Vijay Anand	
1970	Prem Pujari	Dev Anand	
1971	Tere Mere Sapne	Vijay Anand	
1971	Hare Raama Hare Krishna	Dev Anand	
1973	Chhupa Rustam	Vijay Anand	
1973	Shareef Budmaash	Raj Khosla	
1973	Heera Panna	Dev Anand	
1974	Ishk Ishk Ishk	Dev Anand	
1976	Jaaneman	Chetan Anand	
1976	Bullet	Vijay Anand	
1978	Des Pardes	Dev Anand	
1980	Lootmaar	Dev Anand	
1982	Swami Dada	Dev Anand	
1984	Anand Aur Anand	Dev Anand	
1985	Hum Naujawan	Dev Anand	
1989	Sachché Ká Bol-Bálá	Dev Anand	
1990	Awwal Number	Dev Anand	
1991	Sau Crore	Dev Anand	
1993	Pyaar Ka Tarana	Dev Anand	
1994	Gangster	Dev Anand	
1998	Main Solah Baras Ki	Dev Anand	
2001	Censor	Dev Anand	
2001	Master	Suneil Anand	First Martial Arts Film
2003	Love at Times Square	Dev Anand	
2005	Mr Prime Minister	Dev Anand	
2011	Chargesheet	Dev Anand	
