= Kala Pani (1958 film) =

1958 film

- Poster
- Directed by: Raj Khosla
- Written by: Bhappi Sonie
- Screenplay by: G. R. Kamath
- Story by: Anand Pal (adapted); A. J. Cronin (original)
- Based on: Beyond This Place by A. J. Cronin
- Produced by: Dev Anand
- Starring: Dev Anand; Madhubala; Nalini Jaywant
- Cinematography: V. Ratra
- Edited by: Dharam Vir
- Music by: S. D. Burman
- Production company: Navketan Films
- Distributed by: Navketan Films
- Release date: 9 May 1958
- Running time: 164 mins.
- Country: India
- Language: Hindi
- Box office: est. ₹12 million

Kala Pani (lit. 'Black Water'; transl. Solitary confinement) is a 1958 Indian Hindi-language crime thriller film produced by Dev Anand for Navketan Films and directed by Raj Khosla. It is a remake of the 1955 Bengali film Sabar Uparey starring Uttam Kumar and Chabi Biswas which itself was based on A.J. Cronin's 1953 novel Beyond This Place.

The film's music is by S. D. Burman, and the lyrics are by Majrooh Sultanpuri.

Kala Pani was the story of a young man who, upon learning about his father's wrongful implication in a fifteen-year-old murder, vows to bring the true criminals to justice and release his innocent father from prison, with the help of a fearless journalist and a prostitute, who is the eye-witness of the murder and have evidence against the criminals. Dev Anand star as the young man named Karan Mehra, while Madhubala and Nalini Jaywant play a fearless journalist Asha and a prostitute Kishori respectively. Agha and Mukri starred in supporting characters.

Upon its release on 9 May 1958, the film became a commercial success. At the 6th Filmfare Awards, Dev Anand and Nalini Jaywant won Best Actor and Best Supporting Actress, respectively.

== Plot ==
Karan learns that his father Shankarlal, is in jail and that his mother has been pretending from his childhood that his father has died. On meeting his father, Karan learns that he has been jailed (colloquially referred to as "Kala Pani") for a murder that he did not commit. Karan sets out to gather proof of his father's innocence so that he can get the case filed against him re-opened and get him freed.

Karan comes to meet one of the witnesses who had spoken for his father in the court, who tells him about the investigating officer, Inspector Mehta.

Karan stays as a paying guest, of which Asha is the owner and she is also a journalist.

From Inspector Mehta, Karan learns of other witnesses - Kishori and Jumman. The Inspector confesses that although he smelt a rat, he was silenced by the prosecutor Jaswant Rai. Inspector Mehta also tells Karan that he overheard Kishori and Jumman speaking of a letter, and that this might prove to be a mighty proof of Shankarlal's innocence.

Karan goes about to woo Kishori, so that he can get the letters possessed by her. In the meantime, romantic feelings develop between Karan and Asha.

Karan also approaches Jaswant Rai as to how he can reopen the case to prove his father's innocence. He also asks whether it will suffice to get the letter from Kishori. The prosecutor tells him to get the letter first, so that he can see what to make out of it.

The prosecutor turns out to be a villain. He warns Sardari Lal, the person who actually committed the murder, that Karan is after the letter that Kishori possesses. Sardari Lal, in turn, asks Jumman to warn Kishori about this. Kishori confronts Karan saying that he cheated her, that he was showing false love to her. But Karan answers back, that one who is the cause for jailing his innocent father cannot complain to him of lying to her. Kishori, upon knowing the truth, repents and gives the letter to Karan.

An overjoyed Karan shows the letter to the prosecutor, only to see Jaswant Rai burn the letter. Karan realizes that the prosecutor was also involved in the plot. He starts a protest against the prosecutor outside his house but gets arrested by the police.

Asha tries to help him by printing about the prosecutor in the newspaper she works for. However, she is stopped by her editor, who says that she does not have proof to print anything against him.

Kishori learns of this. She comes to Karan, now carrying the original letter. Karan submits this to get the case against his father reopened. The prosecutor Jaswant Rai admits his crime. The story ends with Shankarlal leaving prison, and with Karan marrying Asha.

== Cast ==
- Dev Anand as Karan Khanna / Karan Mehra
- Madhubala as Asha
- Nalini Jaywant as Kishori
- Agha as Badru
- Mukri as Madhosh
- Jankidas as Daulatchand
- Kishore Sahu as Public Prosecutor Rai Bahadur Jaswant Rai
- Krishan Dhawan as Jumman
- Sapru as Diwan Sardarilal
- Nazir Hussain as Inspector Mehta
- M. A. Latif as Shankarlal Mehra
- Mumtaz Begum as Mrs. Mehra
- Rashid Khan as Ramdas
- Bir Sakuja as Deccan Times Editor
- Heera Sawant as Kothewali

== Soundtrack ==
The songs of the film are composed by S. D. Burman and lyrics are by Majrooh Sultanpuri.

Film Song list is as follows:

Song	Singer	Raga
"Hum Bekhudi Mein Tumko Pukarey Chale Gaey"	Mohammed Rafi	Chhayanat (raga)
"Achha Ji Main Haari, Chalo Maan Jao Na"	Mohammed Rafi, Asha Bhosle	
"Dilwale O Dilwale, Ab Teri Gali Tak Aa Pahunche" (Qawwali)	Mohammed Rafi, Asha Bhosle	
"Nazar Lagi Raja Torey Bangley Per" (Mujra song)	Asha Bhosle	Khamaj
"Dil Lagake Kadar Gayi Pyaarey" (Mujra song)	Asha Bhosle	
"Jab Naam-E-Mohabbat Le Ke Kisi Ne Daaman Phailaya" (Mujra song)	Asha Bhosle	

== Technical specs ==
- Movie run time: 164 min (14 reels, 4380.89 m)
- Sound Mix: Mono
- Color: Black and White

== Release ==
=== Critical reception ===
Kala Pani was theatrically released on 9 May 1958, and critic reviews were mostly positive. Bhaichand Patel wrote, "Brilliant performances and songs are highlights of this film." He commented on the performances of lead actors: "The facile charm toned down, the mannerisms off-loaded, [Anand] brings intensity and conviction to his role. Madhubala is effervescent, especially in the song sequence "Accha Ji Main Haari". The film [also] has some fine acting by Nalini Jaywant."

=== Box office ===
Kala Pani was the 8th highest-grossing Bollywood film of 1958.

== Awards ==
- Filmfare Best Actor Award for Dev Anand
- Filmfare Best Supporting Actress Award for Nalini Jaywant
