= Afsar (1950 film) =

- Poster
- Directed by: Chetan Anand
- Screenplay by: Chetan Anand
- Based on: The Government Inspector by Nikolai Gogol
- Produced by: Dev Anand
- Starring: Dev Anand; Suraiya
- Cinematography: V. Ratra
- Music by: Sachin Dev Burman
- Production company: Navketan Films
- Distributed by: Navketan Films
- Release date: 6 January 1950
- Running time: 122 minutes
- Country: India
- Language: Hindi

Afsar is a 1950 Hindi-language romantic comedy film directed by Chetan Anand. It was produced by and starred Dev Anand. It co-starred Suraiya, who also recorded the playback singing for the film. The film was based on Nikolai Gogol's play The Government Inspector. Afsar was the first film produced under the Navketan Films banner. The film was unsuccessful at the box office, which attributed to Suraiya's fading stardom in the early 1950s, and Madhubala's and Nargis' simultaneous rise as the top female stars.

== Plot ==
The story is skillfully set in the last era of British rule when after several historical land reforms in the subcontinent, the government faced the gigantic problem of assessing the actual incomes of landlords to net them in for state revenues. For purpose of direct assessments revenue officers were deputed, while for a larger number of indirect assessments, persons were sent and dispersed to villages in disguise of varying professions and for longer periods to secretly make their own assessment of on the spot realities and of actual sources and incomes.

Dev Anand a smart but long unemployed city youth unaware of the fact that persons have been secretly deputed in disguise to villages, goes along with an illiterate quirky assistant and with no equipment, bare straw furniture and with not even the barest of medical knowledge goes to a village and sets up a dispensary as a last attempt at livelihood.

Soon the ludicrous village simpletons of various sizes and shapes with rustic attires, accents and ways, a real entertainment to watch in the film, finding Dev Anand far removed from their lot, start spying on his activities, peeping in the dispensary through its falling windows and holes, and begin to spin up tales of him being of the disguised agents rumored to have been sent to assess incomes and their sources, and cook up their stories so convincingly that the owner of the entire village, the landlord, already under fear of losing some of his income and even property to the state, believes his men and their tales.

He invites Dev Anand to his impressive haveli, gives him a reception and respect and starts discussions on some medical issues. However the unconvincing, naïve and evasive replies of Dev Anand on medicine further leads the landlord to believe that he is really the agent sent by the state to rope him and his vast income. He offers Dev Anand to stay at his haveli and Dev by now having realized what his is being mistaken for, starts skillfully playing his mistaken identity or rather misperceived identity. The landlord introduces Dev Anand made purposely as a permanent guest to his daughter who is learning dancing and music, and she entertains Dev Anand with some classical songs and dances which are a part of the film.

Without much time and effort while staying at the haveli Dev Anand seduces her by his charms into a relationship without thinking of the consequences.

The landlord had been advised by his men that whatever reports Dev Anand sends to his superiors in the city will necessarily go through the village post office where by design it can be checked and brought back to the landlord to have him see its contents.

Call it misfortune or climax to come Dev Anand sends a letter to a friend in his city, narrating to him how he is enjoying in the village due to a mistaken identity. He also comments on each, the landlord his daughter and village folk, and their idiosyncrasies in the most humorous and somewhere disparaging words. This letter by scheme lands back in the hands of the landlord and read in a village gathering.

Dev Anand is also informed by someone that the letter has fallen into the villagers hands, and he plans to escape. However he confides to the landlords daughter that he is not the one they all are thinking to be, but is just an unemployed miserable young man, who had come to set up a dispensary in the village. The heroine says she accepts him as he is and will always be his companion, and both plan to run away from the village and make for the small railway station.

In the meantime the villagers, who had read the letter exposing Dev Anand, and his sarcastic comments about all in the village, and knowing that he has fled with the landlord's daughter, run towards the railway station. While they are after him, chasing the pair ferociously, Dev and his eloping lady miss the train by a few minutes. What happens can be well imagined, but the end is not within the memory of this writer.

== Cast ==
- Dev Anand as Kapur
- Suraiya as Bimala
- Rashid Khan
- Krishan Dhawan
- Ruma Guha Thakurta
- Kanhaiyalal as Village Tehsildar
- Manmohan Krishna
- Anand Pal
- Mohan Segal
- Zohra Sehgal

== Music ==
Track #	Song	Singer(s)	Lyricist(s)
1	"Mann Mor Huaa Matawaala"	Suraiya	Narendra Sharma
2	"Nain Diwane Ek Nahi Mane"	Suraiya	Narendra Sharma
3	"Gun Gun Gun Gun Bole Re Bhanwar"	Suraiya	Narendra Sharma
4	"Preet Ka Nata Jodne Wale"	Geeta Dutt, Suraiya	Narendra Sharma
5	"Jhat Khol De Kiwad Pat Khol De"	Suraiya	Vishwamitra Aadil
6	"Pardesi Re Jate Jate Kiya Mora Liye Ja"	Suraiya	Narendra Sharma
7	"Sadhu Ke Ghar Chokariya Do"	Manmohan Krishna	Vishwamitra Aadil
