= Baazi (1951 film) =

- Poster
- Directed by: Guru Dutt
- Written by: Balraj Sahni
- Screenplay by: Balraj Sahni
- Story by: Guru Dutt; Balraj Sahni
- Produced by: Dev Anand
- Starring: Dev Anand; Geeta Bali; Kalpana Kartik
- Cinematography: V. Ratra
- Edited by: Y. G. Chawhan
- Music by: S. D. Burman
- Production company: Navketan Films
- Distributed by: Navketan Films
- Release date: 1 July 1951
- Country: India
- Language: Hindi

Baazi (1951)

Baazi (English: Gamble) is a 1951 Indian Hindi noir film directed by Guru Dutt. This was the second film of Dev Anand's production house Navketan Films, and as per a commitment given by Dev Anand to Guru Dutt in their days of struggle, the movie was given to Dutt for direction. Baazi was the first crime noir made in the country. It initiated a new genre called "Bombay Noir", the success of which encouraged and defined the later noir films of 1950s and '60s in Hindi cinema. It was the first film in which Dev Anand came up with his unique style of rapid-fire. The film's story was partly inspired by the 1946 movie Gilda.

The movie stars Dev Anand with Geeta Bali and Kalpana Kartik. It is a crime thriller and had very popular music composed by S.D. Burman.

The film is a tribute to the 1940s' Hollywood Film noir with the morally ambiguous hero, the transgressing siren, and shadow lighting. It was hugely successful at the box office and was the second highest grossing film of 1951 after Awaara.

The Times of India called Baazi "a milestone in the short lived genre that can be loosely called Bombay Noir." It was listed by Filmfare in "Best Bollywood Noir Films of '50s". It is considered one of the Best Noir films to have come from India.

== Synopsis ==
Madan (Dev Anand) comes from a once well-to-do family background, and is now out of work and lives in a shanty with a sick younger sister Manju (Roopa Verman). Unable to find employment, he takes to gambling in a big way. He develops a reputation for being a lucky gambler and is one day found and escorted by a stranger named Pedro to the Star Hotel where he meets the seductive dancer Leena (Geeta Bali) and is offered a job by the mysterious "Maalik" (Boss), of enticing wealthy gentlemen to come and gamble at the club. Initially reluctant to take up this offer due to moral pangs, he refuses and leaves.

He meets the sophisticated and cultured Dr. Rajani (Kalpana Kartik), who has opened a free clinic in his locality to treat the poor and needy and helps him out in the treatment of his sister, who is suffering from tuberculosis. Both are attracted to each other and soon fall in love. Rajani's rich lawyer dad (K.N. Singh) does not approve of Madan, nor of his background, and prefers that Rajani marry her childhood friend Inspector Ramesh (Krishan Dhawan), who is in love with her. Dejected and in dire need of money for his sister's treatment who has been packed off to a sanatorium somewhere in a hill station, Madan accepts the job at star club and meets more frequently with the sexy club dancer Leena. He becomes friends with her and is seen discussing his troubles and thoughts with her. In turn, she is obviously charmed by him and evidently has a soft spot for him.

Soon Inspector Ramesh arrests Madan and imprisons him for the murder of Leena, who was killed with a revolver with Madan's fingerprints on it. The shooter intended to kill Madan, but Leena protected him and was killed instead. Rajani's father (who turns out to be Maalik, the mysterious Boss of Star Club) had ordered the killing because he didn't consider Madan suitable for his daughter. Rajani's father threatens Madan that he will kill his sister if he says anything. Madan keeps quiet and is sentenced to be hanged at 6 am. Inspector Ramesh finds evidence that Madan did not kill Leena. He sets a trap for Rajani's father and leads him to believe that Madan has been hanged, and in his joy, confesses his plan to frame Madan. Rajani's father is arrested and imprisoned while Madan is sent to three months' worth probation for indulging in gambling activities. He is released after serving his sentence and is united with Rajani.

== Cast ==
- Dev Anand as Madan
- Geeta Bali as Leena
- Kalpana Kartik as Rajani
- Roopa Verman as Manju
- Krishan Dhawan as Ramesh
- K. N. Singh as Rajani's Father
- Rashid Khan as Pedro
- Johnny Walker
- Nirmal Kumar

== Music ==
Baazi

Studio album by Sachin Dev Burman
- Released: 1951
- Recorded: 1951
- Genre: Feature film soundtrack
- Label: EMI Records
- Producer: Sachin Dev Burman

Lyrics were written by Sahir Ludhianvi.

Song	Singer(s)
"Mere Labon Pe Chhipe Aaj Bhi Tarane Hai"	Kishore Kumar
"Suno Gajar Kya Gaaye, Samay Guzar Na Jaaye"	Geeta Dutt
"Dekh Ke Akeli Mohe Barkha Sataaye"	Geeta Dutt
"Yeh Kaun Aaya Ki Meri Dil Ki Duniya Mein Bahaar Aayi"	Geeta Dutt
"Tadbeer Se Bigdi Hui Taqdeer Bana Le"	Geeta Dutt
"Aaj Ki Raat Piya, Dil Na Todo"	Geeta Dutt
"Tum Bhi Na Bhoolo Balam"	Geeta Dutt
"Sharmaaye Kaahe Ghabraaye Kaahe"	Shamshad Begum
