= Banarasi Babu (1973 film) =

- Directed by: Shankar Mukherjee
- Written by: Akhil Kumar (dialogue director); K. A. Narayan (screenplay, story); Ramesh Pant (dialogue)
- Produced by: Shankar Mukherjee
- Starring: Dev Anand; Raakhee; Yogeeta Bali
- Edited by: Babu Lavande
- Music by: Kalyanji-Anandji
- Release date: 30 March 1973
- Country: India
- Language: Hindi

Banarasi Babu (Note: A gentleman from Varanasi) is a 1973 Hindi film directed by Shankar Mukherjee. The film stars Dev Anand, Raakhee, Yogeeta Bali, I. S. Johar, Jeevan. The movie was a hit on its release. The rights & IPR of this film are now owned by Ruchi Pictures.

== Plot ==
Orphaned Sohan Lal is a wealthy businessman based in Bombay. While on vacation in Kashmir, he meets with beautiful Neela, and after a few misunderstandings both fall in love, and get married. When they return to Bombay, his Manager, V. K. Saxena asks him to travel to London for some business, which he does. Three months later when he returns home, he finds that Neela has not come to receive him at the airport, then on the way home, he is attacked, abducted, and placed in a cell, where a woman, Gulabiya, tells him that she is his sweetheart. With her help he manages to escape, has an accident, ends up in hospital, where he gets to meet a woman who calls him her son. Baffled and exasperated at these turn of events, he returns home to get a very cold response from Neela, who is about to inherit Rs.70 Lakhs from her deceased uncle. While Sohan decides to find out what exactly is going on, and why his life is in shambles, he does not know that this knowledge may well cost him his life.

== Cast ==
- Dev Anand as Sohan / Mohan (Double Role)
- Raakhee as Neela
- Yogeeta Bali as Gulabiya
- I. S. Johar as Kishan / Jackpot
- Jeevan as V. K. Saxena
- Veena as Sohan & Mohan's Mother
- Manorama as Monica
- Master Bhagwan as Dada
- Faryal as Rita
- Raj Rani as Sohan's Foster Mother
- Shivraj as Advocate Dutt
- Marutirao Parab as Dada's sidekick

== Soundtrack ==
The movie boasts one of the best performances of Kishore Kumar, Lata Mangeshkar, Asha Bhosle. Banarasi Babu marked the score as some of the best music composed by duo Kalyanji-Anandji and memorable lyrics of Rajendra Krishan.

| Song | Singer |
|---|---|
| "Mere Peechhe Ek Ladki" | Kishore Kumar |
| "Hamara Naam Banarasi Babu" | Kishore Kumar |
| "Aap Yahan Se Jane Ka Kya Loge, Kya Loge, Kya Doge" | Kishore Kumar, Asha Bhosle |
| "Kamar Meri Lattu" | Asha Bhosle |
| "Yeh Jo Peene Ki Aadat" | Lata Mangeshkar |
| "Koi Koi Raat Aisi Hoti Hai" | Lata Mangeshkar |
| "Mere Peechhe Ek Ladka" | Lata Mangeshkar |
