= Aandhiyan (1952 film) =

1952 film by Chetan Anand

- Poster
- Directed by: Chetan Anand
- Written by: Chetan Anand
- Screenplay by: Chetan Anand
- Story by: Chetan Anand; Hameed Butt
- Produced by: Dev Anand
- Starring: Dev Anand; Kalpana Kartik; Nimmi
- Cinematography: Jal Mistry
- Edited by: M. D. Jadhav
- Music by: Ali Akbar Khan
- Production company: Navketan Films
- Distributed by: Navketan Films
- Release date: 1952
- Running time: 96 minutes
- Country: India
- Language: Hindi

Aandhiyan (English: Cruel Winds) is a 1952 Hindi drama, written and directed by Chetan Anand. The story was written by Chetan Anand and Hameed Butt, and was based on an actual event in Amritsar. It stars Dev Anand, Kalpana Kartik, Nimmi in lead roles. The music of the film was composed by the classical musician Ali Akbar Khan, with lyrics by Narendra Sharma.

Jaidev, who was a student of Khan from Lucknow, and later became a noted music director, started his career by assisting Khan in film music. The background score of the film was also done by Ali Akbar Khan along with other Hindustani classical musicians, including Pandit Ravi Shankar and Pannalal Ghosh. Lata Mangeshkar sang the title song "Har Kahin Pe Shaadmani", and, as a token of her respect to sarod maestro, did not charge any fee. The dances were choreographed by Lakshmi Shankar, who also sang a song, while Gopi Krishan choreographed his own dances.

== Plot ==
Ram Mohan (Dev Anand), an honest lawyer, is in love with Janki (Kalpana Kartik), the beautiful daughter of Lala Dindayal (M. A. Latif). Dindayal accepts the marriage proposal. On the other side, Kuberdas (K. N. Singh), a rich businessman has a lustful eye on Janki. In order to marry Janki, he devises a wicked plan, asking the already cash strapped Dindayal to either sell off his assets and repay the loan he had given in the past or give his daughter Janki's hand in marriage.

== Cast ==
- Dev Anand as Advocate Ram Mohan
- Kalpana Kartik as Janki
- Nimmi as Rani
- K. N. Singh as Kuberdas
- Johnny Walker as Mastram
- M. A. Latif as Lala Dindayal
- Leela Mishra as Mrs. Dindayal
- Durga Khote as Ram's Mother
- Pratima Devi as Rampyari

== Soundtrack ==
Song	Singer
"Aayi Aisi Aandhiyan"	Lata Mangeshkar
"Hai Kahin Par Shadmani"	Lata Mangeshkar
"Zindagi Ke Sabz Daaman"	Lata Mangeshkar
"Dard Bant Raha Hai"	Asha Bhosle
"Dil Ka Khazana Khol Diya"	Asha Bhosle
"Woh Chand Nahin Hai, Dil Hai Kisi Deewane Ka"	Asha Bhosle, Hemant Kumar
"Main Mubarakbaad Dene"	Surinder Kaur
"Ghanshyam Ke Hai"	Lakshmi Shankar
