= Suneil Anand =

Indian film actor and director (1956–2026)

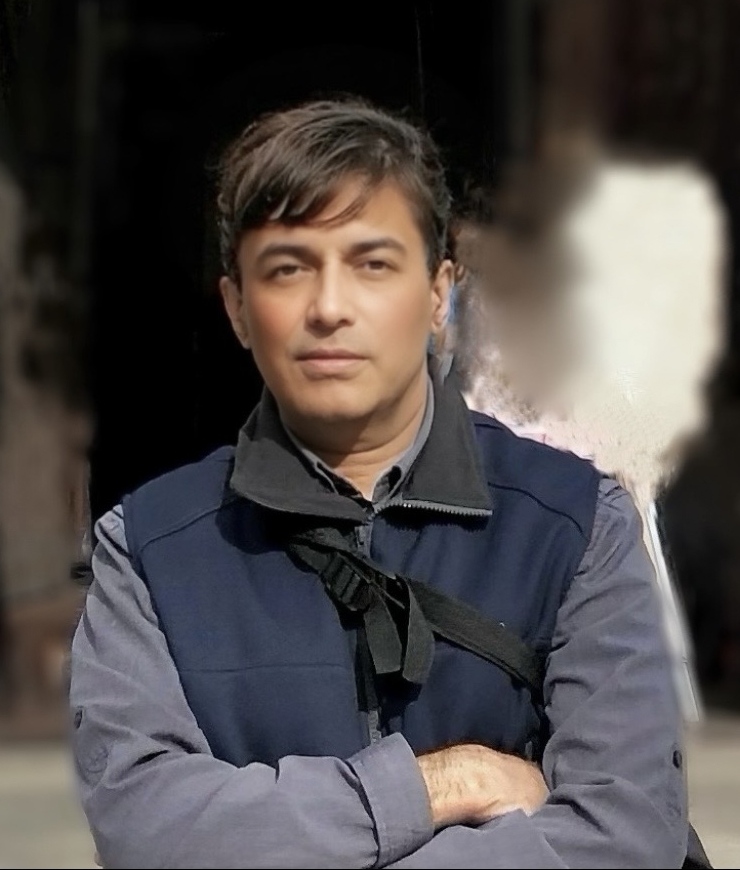
- Anand in 2005
- Born: 30 June 1956; Zurich, Switzerland
- Died: 26 July 2026 (aged 70); London, England
- Occupation: Actor
- Parents: Dev Anand (father); Kalpana Kartik (mother)
- Family: Anand family

Suneil Anand (30 June 1956 – 26 July 2026) was an Indian actor and film director. He was the son of actors Dev Anand and Kalpana Kartik. He also managed Navketan Films, owned by his father.

== Early life and education ==
Suneil Anand was born on 30 June 1956, in Zurich, Switzerland, while his parents were on their way to attend the Karlovy Vary Film Festival, where he was the youngest delegate. He had a degree in business administration from American University, Washington, D.C.

His uncles were Chetan Anand and Vijay Anand. His cousins were Indian Film director Ketan Anand, Vivek Anand, Indian actor and film-maker Shekhar Kapoor, Neelu, and Aruna. Neelu was married to actor Navin Nischol, while Aruna is married to Parikshit Sahni, son of Balraj Sahni.

He had trained in Wing Tsun in Hong Kong.

== Career ==
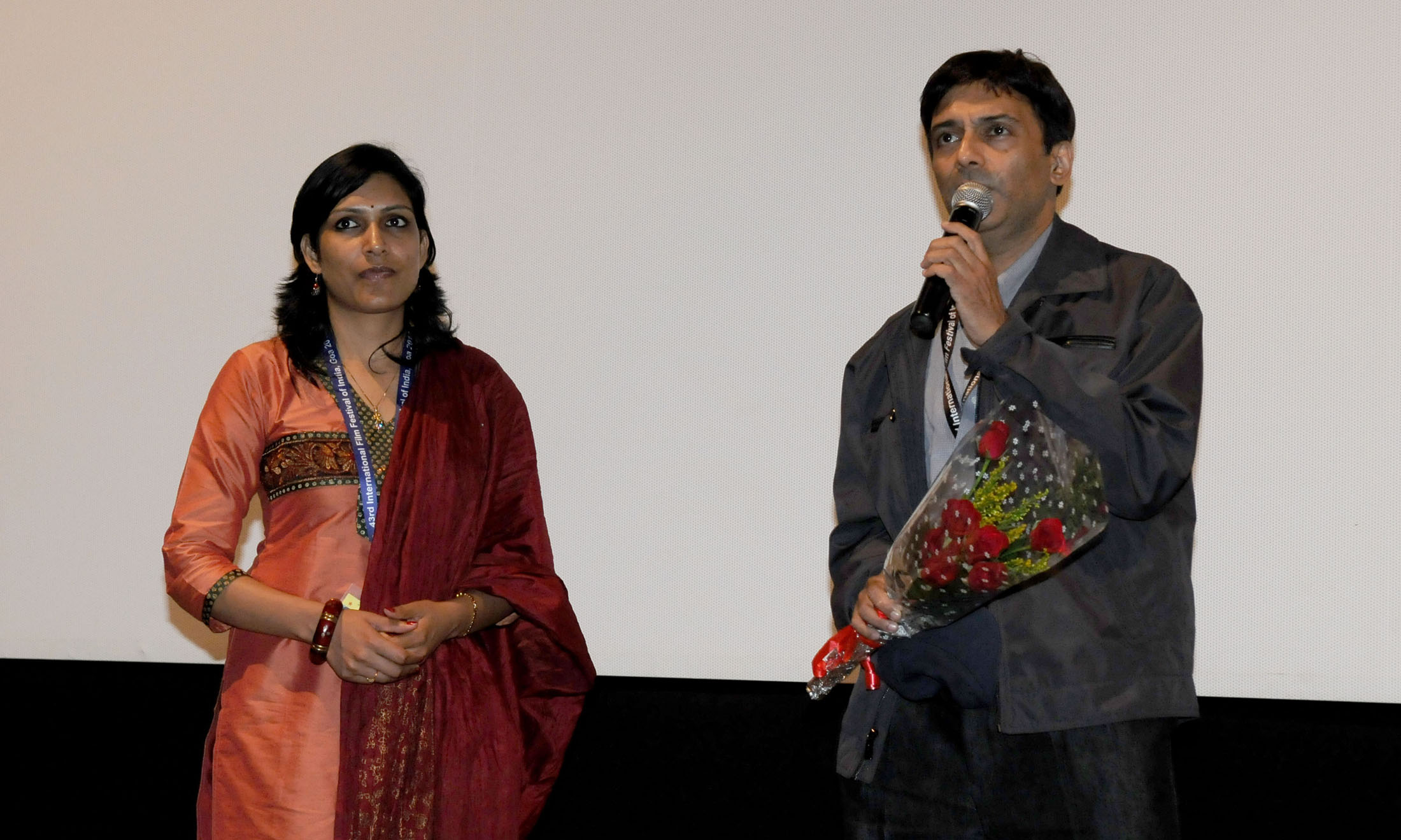
Suneil Anand (right), IFFI (2012)

Anand acted in Anand Aur Anand (1984), Main Tere Liye (1989), Car Thief (1991) and Master (2001).

His first directorial venture, Master, a martial arts film, was released in 2001. In 2014 he began work on a Hollywood Movie, Vagator Mixer. It remains unreleased till date.

== Death ==
Anand died from a heart attack in London, on 26 July 2026, at the age of 70.

== Filmography ==
Year	Film	Notes
1984	Anand Aur Anand	
1989	Main Tere Liye	
1991	Car Thief	Delayed Release
2001	Master	Directorial Debut
	Vagator Mixer	Actor & Director

== Sources ==
- Anand, Dev (2007), Romancing With Life, An Autobiography, Penguin/ Viking, pp. p. 162, 165–166, 168, 178, 247, 274–277, 284, 314, 358–59, 411. ISBN 0-670-08124-8
