= House No. 44 =

- Directed by: M. K. Burman
- Story by: Vishwamitter Adil
- Produced by: Dev Anand
- Starring: Dev Anand; Kalpana Kartik; K. N. Singh
- Cinematography: V. Ratra
- Edited by: Dharamvir; M.D. Jadhav Rao
- Music by: S. D. Burman; Sahir Ludhianvi (lyrics)
- Production company: Navketan Films
- Release date: 4 February 1955
- Country: India
- Language: Hindi

House No. 44 is a 1955 Hindi film directed by M. K. Burman and produced by Dev Anand for his banner Navketan Films. The movie stars Dev Anand and Kalpana Kartik in a lead role. The film is also noted for its popular songs with music by S. D. Burman, with lyrics by Sahir Ludhianvi, including "Teri Duniya Mein Jeene Se" and "Chup Hai Dharti Chup Hain Chand Sitaare", sung by Hemant Kumar.

== Plot ==
Ashok works for the notorious gangster Sunder and his men. One day, he comes across a dead body and he reports it to the police. Ashok then meets Nimmo and falls in love with her. Nimmo asks Ashok to leave the life of a gangster and settle down with her. Ashok agrees, but after a few days of not having any food, Ashok realizes that he was better off being a gangster. The rest of the movie portrays the struggle of Ashok trying to stay with Nimmo or with Sunder.

== Cast ==
- Dev Anand as Ashok
- Kalpana Kartik as Nimmo
- K. N. Singh as Captain
- Bhagwan Sinha as Sunder
- Rashid Khan as Jiboo
- Kumkum in song Dekh idhar o jaadugar
- Sheela Vaz as dancer in hotel
- Kammo as Jiboo's daughter
- Shivraj as Nimmo's father and chowkidar
- Sarita
- Prabhu Dayal
- Ratan Gaurang as poor man in restaurant

== Songs ==
The film's music score was given by S. D. Burman, with lyrics by Sahir Ludhianvi

Song	Singer
"Unche Sur Mein Gaye Ja"	Kishore Kumar
"Phaili Huyi Hai"	Lata Mangeshkar
"Peechhe Peechhe Aakar, Chhoo Lo Hamen Pakar"	Lata Mangeshkar, Hemant Kumar
"Tere Duniya Mein"	Hemant Kumar
"Chup Hai Dharti"	Hemant Kumar
"Aag Lage Bangle Mein"	Asha Bhosle
"Dekh Idhar O Jadugar"	Asha Bhosle
"Dum Hai Baaki"	Asha Bhosle
