= Jaaneman (1976 film) =

1976 Indian romance film by Chetan Anand

- Poster
- Directed by: Chetan Anand
- Written by: Kaul Tarun Sen
- Produced by: Dev Anand
- Starring: Dev Anand; Hema Malini; Durga Khote; Premnath; Ajit Khan
- Music by: Laxmikant–Pyarelal
- Production company: Navketan Films
- Release date: 30 July 1976 (India)

Jaaneman (transl. Sweetheart) is an Indian Hindi-language romance film, released on 30 July 1976, starring Hema Malini and Dev Anand. It was made in the silver jubilee year of the production company Navketan Films.

== Synopsis ==
The story is about twins Santo and Banto, played by Hema Malini, in a double role. Santo is the alter ego of Banto. Santo is a good religious girl who comes to Mumbai in search of her sister Banto from Punjab, after her mother expires, as she believes that Banto is a tutor in a man named Gulbahar Singh's, (Ajit Khan) house. She hires the taxi of Ronnie, played by Dev Anand, to search for her sister's house, but finds only goons at the various addresses of Gulbahar Singh. As Ronnie's mother, played by Durga Khote, has left for a holy pilgrimage, he takes Santo to his house for the time being, taking pity on a lone girl, promising to look for her sister. Santo adapts to Ronnie's lifestyle, cooks and cleans for him, and brings the piety of God Krishna, to his house. Ronnie and Santo fall in love.

In the backdrop is introduced Banto, who has become a criminal Madam and prostitute, called Ramkali, running a crime den from her house, unknowingly for no other than Gulbahar Singh, who is top notch criminal smuggler and Don.

Meanwhile, Ronnie gives up his old berating taxi owner and starts working for a God Hanuman devotee, Seth Ram Bharose, played by Premnath, who is in love with the nautch girl Ramkali. Ram Bharose sends jasmine flowers to her through his workers and taxi drivers to woo her and thus sends Ronnie to her one day. Ronnie is shocked to see that the nautch girl is a look-alike of Santo and believes her to be Banto, the lost sister of Santo.

Banto, capitalizing on her admirer Ram Bharose's attachment to her, asks him to send his taxi driver Ronnie for her unlawful errands, to which Ronnie takes a strong objection and also informs the police, when he discovers a cache of diamonds with Bharat Kapoor, posing as a doctor and sent by Ramkali. Gulbahar Singh arrives in town after this and wants to take revenge on the taxi driver. He has never seen the nautch girl Ramkali, who works for him. Meanwhile, Ramkali confesses her love to Ronnie, which he rejects, but she pleads with him telling him that she was in the trade to take revenge from Gulbahar Singh, in whose house she had worked as a tutor, to his two children, and who had raped her. The story follows many twists and turns, ultimately ending with the climax of Ronnie busting the criminal gang of Gulbahar Singh, and Banto taking her revenge, but being killed in the process. Ramkali dies as Banto, after being united to her sister Santo. Ronnie and Santo culminate their love with the blessings of his mother.

== Cast ==
- Dev Anand as Ronnie Taxi Driver
- Hema Malini as Santo / Banto / Ramkali
- Durga Khote as Ronnie's Mother
- Premnath as Seth Ram Bharose
- Ajit Khan as Gulbahar Singh / Rajasaheb
- Iftekhar as Police Commissioner
- Paintal as Mithoo
- Jankidas as Taxi Driver
- Bharat Kapoor as Ramkali's Associate
- Jagdish Raj as Taxi Driver

== Songs ==
1. "Jaaneman Jaaneman" - Kishore Kumar
2. "Mainne Kyaa Ji, Ki Gal Hai Koi Nahin" - Kishore Kumar, Lata Mangeshkar
3. "Aaegi Aaegi Aaegi Kisi Ko Hamaari Yaad Aaegi" - Lata Mangeshkar
4. "Iss Mulakat Kaa Bas Maja Lijiye" - Mohammed Rafi, Hemlata, Mukesh
5. "Allahbad Me Paida Huyee" - Lata Mangeshkar
6. "Siyavar Ramchandra Ki Jay" - Anand Kumar C, Manna Dey, Anuradha Paudwal, Vinod Sharma
7. "Jaaneman Jaaneman (Version 2)" - Kishore Kumar
8. "Jaaneman Jaaneman (Version 3)" - Kishore Kumar
