= Chargesheet (film) =

- Theatrical release poster
- Directed by: Dev Anand
- Screenplay by: Dev Anand
- Produced by: Dev Anand
- Starring: Jackie Shroff; Divya Dutta; Naseeruddin Shah; Dev Anand
- Cinematography: Chaman K. Bajoo
- Edited by: Dev Anand; Ashok Bandekar
- Music by: Sanjay Jaydeep; AD Boyz; Raja Kashif
- Production company: Navketan International
- Distributed by: Warner Bros. Pictures
- Release date: 30 September 2011
- Country: India
- Language: Hindi
- Box office: ₹0.57 Million

Chargesheet is a 2011 Indian crime thriller film directed by Dev Anand, starring himself, Jackie Shroff, Naseeruddin Shah and Divya Dutta in lead roles, while Riya Sen appears in an item-number. The film is named after a formal document of accusation prepared by a law-enforcement agency in India.

It was Dev Anand's last movie before his death on 3 December 2011.

== Synopsis ==
The film is loosely based on the death of the late Divya Bharti and the mystery surrounding it, as even today the circumstances of her death are unknown. It also focuses on the criminal lives of common people.

== Cast ==
- Dev Anand as Gambhir Singh
- Naseeruddin Shah as Sultan
- Jackie Shroff as Mahesh
- Divya Dutta as Mini
- Milind Gunaji as Jimmy
- Yashpal Sharma as Suraj
- Shehzad Khan as Marian
- Riya Sen as Special Appearance in Item number
- Anish Vikramaditya as Ramu

== Soundtrack ==
Chargsheet's music was created with unparalleled passion by Dev Anand

No.	Title	Lyrics	Music	Singer(s)	Length
1.	"Chargesheet - Title Song"	Anant Joshi	Sanjay Jaydeep	Sunidhi Chauhan
2.	"Chargesheet (Male Version)"	Anant Joshi	Sanjay Jaydeep	Shaan
3.	"Bollywood Bollywood"	Anant Joshi	Sanjay Jaydeep	Sunidhi Chauhan, Shreya Ghoshal
4.	"Sapnon ki Hoon Main Rani"	Anant Joshi	Sanjay Jaydeep	Asha Bhosle
5.	"Har Dil Akela"		AD Boyz	Asha Bhosle
6.	"Mera Ishq Bhi Tu, Mera Pyar Bhi Tu"	Neeraj	Raja Kashif	Shankar Mahadevan
