= Heera Panna =

- Poster
- Directed by: Dev Anand
- Written by: Dev Anand; Suraj Sanim
- Produced by: Dev Anand
- Starring: Dev Anand; Zeenat Aman; Raakhee; Rehman; Jeevan
- Cinematography: Fali Mistry
- Edited by: Babu Sheikh
- Music by: R. D. Burman
- Distributed by: Navketan International Films; Eros Entertainment
- Release date: 5 January 1973
- Country: India
- Language: Hindi

Heera Panna is a 1973 Hindi romance film. Written, produced, and directed by Dev Anand for Navketan films, the film stars Dev Anand, Zeenat Aman, Raakhee, Rehman, Jeevan, A.K. Hangal, Paintal and Dheeraj Kumar. The film's music was composed by R. D. Burman.

== Plot ==
Heera (Dev Anand) has two passions in his life, namely photography and his love for Reema (Raakhee), an air hostess. When Reema passes away in an airplane accident, Heera is left with his only passion in life – photography. During one of his photographic sessions with Raja Sahab (Rehman), a priceless diamond is stolen by Panna (Zeenat Aman) and hidden in Heera's car. When Heera learns about this theft and that he is in possession of the stolen property, he decides to turn Panna to the police but discovers to his shock that Panna is Reema's younger sister. Feeling pity for her, Heera decides not to. While Heera describes to her how he met Reema on a plane, how they fell in love, and the tragic accident resulting in her death, Panna narrates how she was tempted by Anil (Dheeraj Kumar) and ultimately forced into joining the dark world of theft and robbery. Hearing all this, Heera remembers how Reema once told him to take care of her sister and vows to save her from the ruffians. Soon Anil and his men along with Hari's (Jeevan) goons (the group's mastermind) reach Heera and Panna's hiding place. In the confrontation that takes place, they fail to snatch the diamond away from Heera, but Panna gets hit fatally and eventually succumbs to her wounds. The Police along with Raja Sahab and Panna's father arrive; Heera who is accused of stealing the diamond proves himself innocent and hands over the same to the police who arrest all the henchmen. The film ends as Heera drives away in his car, left with the memories of both Reema and Panna.

== Cast ==
- Dev Anand as Heera
- Raakhee as Reema
- Zeenat Aman as Panna
- Rehman as Raja Sahib
- Jeevan as Hari
- Paintal as Kamal
- Sudhir as Kamran
- Sheetal as Ratna
- A. K. Hangal as Diwan Karan Singh
- Manmohan as Veeru
- Mac Mohan as Anil's Photographer
- Dheeraj Kumar as Anil

== Crew ==
- Director – Dev Anand
- Writer – Dev Anand, Suraj Sanim (additional dialogue)
- Producer – Dev Anand, Kalpana Kartik (associate)
- Editor – Babu Sheikh, Ashok Bandekar (assistant), Achyut Gupte (color consultant)
- Cinematographer – Fali Mistry
- Art Director – T. K. Desai
- Production Company – Navketan International Films
- Production Manager – Rashid Abbasi, Kumar D. Bhutani, R. S. Manian, Manohar, N. Mehra
- Assistant Director – Vishwamitter Adil, Gogi Anand
- Assistant Art Director – Nana, Sharad Pole
- Costume and Wardrobe – Amarnath, Balchandra
- Music Director – Rahul Dev Burman
- Music Assistant – Basudeb Chakraborty, Maruti Rao, Manohari Singh
- Lyricist – Anand Bakshi
- Playback Singers – Kishore Kumar, Asha Bhosle, Lata Mangeshkar

== Music ==
The music of the film was composed by Rahul Dev Burman and the lyrics were written by Anand Bakshi

- The song "Panna Ki Tamanna Hai" was listed at #14 on the Binaca Geetmala annual list 1974.

Song	Singer
"Panna Ki Tamanna Hai Ke Heera Mujhe Mil Jaye"	Kishore Kumar, Lata Mangeshkar
"Bahut Door Mujhe Chale Jana Hai"	Kishore Kumar, Lata Mangeshkar
"Ek Paheli Hai Tu, Naar Naveli Hai Tu"	Kishore Kumar, Asha Bhosle
"Main Tasveer Utaarta Hoon"	Kishore Kumar
