= Swami Dada =

- Poster
- Directed by: Dev Anand
- Written by: Dev Anand
- Produced by: Dev Anand
- Starring: Dev Anand; Mithun Chakraborty; Rati Agnihotri; Padmini Kohlapure; Naseeruddin Shah; Jackie Shroff
- Cinematography: D.K.Prabhakar
- Music by: R. D. Burman
- Release date: 3 December 1982
- Country: India
- Language: Hindi

Swami Dada is a 1982 Indian Hindi-language action film directed by Dev Anand, starring Mithun Chakraborty, Naseeruddin Shah, newcomer Christine O'Neil, Padmini Kohlapure and Dev Anand. The film was the debut film of Jackie Shroff. The film's soundtrack and score was composed by R.D. Burman.

== Plot ==
Swami Dada is the story of Hari Mohan, a saintly person who organizes Hindu prayers and discourses in a warm and welcoming atmosphere. He is called "Swami Dada" by everyone. He has many followers and devotees who throng in large numbers to hear his sermons. What they do not know is that Hari Mohan is a professional thief, and is now conspiring with a young woman, and a group of orphaned children to steal the temple's jewelry.

== Cast ==
- Dev Anand as Hari Mohan/Swami Dada
- Mithun Chakraborty as Suresh
- Rati Agnihotri as Seema
- Padmini Kohlapure as Chamkili
- Naseeruddin Shah as Aslam
- Kulbhushan Kharbanda as Ramu Dada/Bhagwan Seth
- Shakti Kapoor as Jaggu
- Mohan Sherry
- Bharat Kapoor
- Jackie Shroff (Uncredited)

== Soundtrack ==
Swami Dada

Film score by R. D. Burman
- Released: 1982
- Genre: Feature film soundtrack
- Label: Saregama

The music was composed by R. D. Burman and the lyrics were written by Anjaan.

Song	Singer
"Pyar Lo Pyar Do"	Kishore Kumar
"Jeenewale Jeena Hai To Jaan Le Jeene Ki Gun"	Kishore Kumar, Lata Mangeshkar
"Galiyon Galiyon Khaak Bahut Din Humne Chhaani"	Kishore Kumar, Lata Mangeshkar
"Zindagi Yeh Kaisi Hai, Jaise Jeeyo Waisi Hai"	Kishore Kumar, Asha Bhosle, Amit Kumar
"Ek Roop Kai Naam, Man Mandir Tera Dhaam"	Kishore Kumar, Asha Bhosle
"Patakha Phooljhadi"	Asha Bhosle
