= Zamane Se Poocho =

- Directed by: Abrar
- Produced by: Maiqada Movies
- Starring: Ambrish Kapadia; Kader Khan; Murad
- Music by: Sharda Rajan Iyengar
- Release date: 1976
- Country: India
- Language: Hindi

Zamane Se Poocho is a 1976 Bollywood drama film directed by Abrar Alvi.

== Cast ==
- Ambrish Kapadia
- Kader Khan
- Satyendra Kapoor
- Murad
- Faryal

== Songs ==
1. "Holi Aai Re" – Kishore Kumar, Mohammed Rafi, Sharda
2. "Ae Ishq Kahin Le Chal Rangeen Fizaaon Mein" – Sharda
3. "Aapke Qarib Aapke Hi Paas" – Krishna Kalle
4. "Dekho Dekho Baaten Karti Main Khaamoshi Hoon" – Sharda
5. "Dil Mein Jo Aaya Apun Kiya" – Mohammed Rafi
6. "Ham Bhanvar Mein Kinaare Banaaya Karen" – Krishna Kalle
7. "Rootthoge Mana Loongi Badi Raat Padi Hai" – Sharda
