= Faryal (actress) =

Indian film actress and dancer

- Born: Faryal Manmohan; 3 November 1945 (age 80); Damascus, Syria
- Occupations: actress, dancer
- Years active: 1965–present

Faryal (born 3 November 1945). She is an actress and dancer of mixed Indian and Arabic descent working in Hindi films. She was a popular Bollywood cabaret dancer and actress in the 1960s and 1970s.

== Early life and background ==
Faryal was born in the Damascus area of Syria to an Indian father and a Syrian-Lebanese mother. She completed her education at Loretto Convent, Simla, Cathedral High School and St. Xavier's College, Mumbai. Faryal worked for a while as an air hostess in Air India before joining films. She is a product of the FilmaIaya School of Acting.

== Career ==
Faryal entered Bollywood in 1965 in the black-and-white film Zindagi Aur Maut, in lead role opposite Pradeep Kumar. This film contained famous song "Dil Laga kar hum ye samjhe" sung solo by Asha Bhosle and Mahendra Kapoor; both these songs are available on YouTube. Faryal was liked by people and resulted in her getting the lead role in the film Biradari opposite Shashi Kapoor. The movie was a total flop. She was noted for her role as a cabaret dancer in the movie Jewel Thief, released in 1967. After the movie's release, offers started pouring in. In an interview in 1973, Faryal stated that "Ever since Goldie cast me in that glamorous dancer's role in Jewel Thief, film makers have looked upon me as an "excellent cabaret dancer". "Whereas in reality I have never learnt dancing,". "I don't even like dancing; I rather hate it". She was also noticed for her roles in the Rajesh Khanna-Mumtaz starrer Sachcha Jhootha and the Dharmendra-Waheeda Rehman starrer Man Ki Aankhen. At first afraid of being typecast, Faryal was reluctant to accept the numerous offers that she received soon after the release of Jewel Thief. But gradually she realized that if she refused the roles there were ten others ready to replace her. "And now the bath tub scene in Apradh released in 1972 had given me an even worse image", she quipped. Faryal retired from movies in 1984 after her performance as the girlfriend of Jeetendra in Gold Medal.

== Personal life ==
Faryal married after quitting movies, and she is currently living in Israel.

== Selected filmography ==
Year	Film	Role	Notes
1965	Zindagi Aur Maut		Debut
1966	Biradri	Seema	
1967	Jewel Thief	Julie	Cabaret dancer
1968	Fareb		
1969	The Gold Medal		
1970	Insaan Aur Shaitan	Ratna	
1970	Man Ki Aankhen	Vandana	
1970	Pushpanjali	Lata Khanna	
1970	Sachaa Jhutha	Ruby	
1970	Puraskar		
1971	Hungama	Rita	
1971	Ek Thi Reeta		
1972	Apradh		
1972	Rani Mera Naam		
1973	Khoon Khoon		
1973	Dharma	Cabaret dancer	
1973	Raampur Ka Lakshman	Cabaret dancer	
1973	Jheel Ke Us Paar	Maya	
1973	Door Nahin Manzil	Sunaina	
1974	Dharmatma		
1974	Manoranjan	Lolita	
1975	Rafoo Chakkar	In-charge of girls' band	
1975	Dafaa 302		
1976	Zamane Se Poocho		
1977	Aafat		
