= Shareef Budmaash =

- Poster
- Directed by: Raj Khosla
- Produced by: Dev Anand
- Starring: Dev Anand; Hema Malini
- Music by: R. D. Burman
- Release date: 13 April 1973
- Country: India
- Language: Hindi

Shareef Budmaash (transl. A decent rogue) is a 1973 Bollywood action thriller film directed by Raj Khosla. The film stars Dev Anand and Hema Malini, along with Ajit and Jeevan in pivotal roles.

== Plot ==
A gangster called Diwan gets ahold of government plans for a new type of military aircraft, which he hides in his safe. When the police ask him to show them his valuables, Diwan is shocked to find he has been burgled. What follows is a complex series of events in which various criminals and gangsters attempt to get money in exchange for the stolen plans and valuables, which have gone missing.

== Cast ==
- Dev Anand as Inspector Ramesh / Rocky
- Hema Malini as Seema
- Ajit as Ranjeet
- Jeevan as Diwan
- Helen as Carmen / Rita
- Shatrughan Sinha as Rocky / Kanhaiyalal
- Trilok Kapoor as DIG Chicha Prasad
- Jankidas as Prisoner Sitaram
- D. K. Sapru as Lawyer Sinha
- Sudhir as Ajit
- Mac Mohan as Rafiq
- Bhagwan as Shambhu
- Gurbachan Singh as Jaggu

== Soundtrack ==
The songs were composed by R. D. Burman and written by Anand Bakshi.

Song	Singer
"Main Nikal Jaunga"	Kishore Kumar
"Tere Sau Deewane"	Kishore Kumar
"Neend Churake Raaton Mein, Tumne Baaton Baaton Mein"	Kishore Kumar, Asha Bhosle
"Meri Mohabbat Mein"	Lata Mangeshkar
"Mohabbat Baazi Jeetegi"	Asha Bhosle
