= Tere Mere Sapne (1971 film) =

- Directed by: Vijay Anand
- Written by: Screenplay & Dialogues: Vijay Anand
- Story by: Kaushal Bharti (adapted); A. J. Cronin (original)
- Based on: The Citadel by A. J. Cronin
- Produced by: Dev Anand
- Starring: Dev Anand; Mumtaz; Hema Malini; Vijay Anand
- Cinematography: V. Ratra
- Edited by: Vijay Anand
- Music by: S. D. Burman
- Production company: Navketan Films
- Release date: 1971
- Running time: 171 minutes
- Country: India
- Language: Hindi

Tere Mere Sapne (transl. Our Dreams) is a 1971 film produced by Dev Anand, and written and directed by his brother Vijay Anand for Navketan Films. The movie stars Dev Anand, Mumtaz, Hema Malini and Vijay Anand in key roles. The film's music is by S. D. Burman and the story is based on The Citadel, a novel by A.J. Cronin. In 1972, it was made as Bengali film Jiban Saikate, with Soumitra Chatterjee and Aparna Sen and in 1982, it was remade into the Telugu film Madhura Swapnam.

== Cast ==
- Dev Anand as Dr. Anand Kumar
- Mumtaz as Nisha Patel / Nisha Kumar
- Hema Malini as Maltimala (Sp. App.)
- Mahesh Kaul as Dr. Prasad
- Vijay Anand as Dr. Jagannath Kothari
- Tabassum as Maltimala's Hairdresser
- Agha as Dr. Bhutani
- Paro as Mrs. Prasad
- Leela Mishra as Nisha's aunt
- Sapru as Phoolchand
- Jayshree T. as Dancer in song "Mera Saajan Phool Kamal Ka"
- Mumtaz Begum as Maltimala's Mother
- Prem Nath as Seth. Madhochand
- Dulari as Phoolchand's Wife

== Soundtrack ==
All lyrics are written by Neeraj; all music is composed by S.D. Burman.

Tere Mere Sapne

Soundtrack album by S. D. Burman
- Released: 1972
- Genre: Feature film soundtrack
- Length: 35:00
- Language: Hindi
- Label: Universal Music India
- Producer: S. D. Burman

S. D. Burman chronology
Chaitali (1971)	Tere Mere Sapne (1972)	Yeh Gulistan Hamara (1971)

Songs
No.	Title	Singer(s)	Length
1.	"Hey Maine Kasam Li"	Kishore Kumar & Lata Mangeshkar	4:03
2.	"Jeevan Ki Bagia Mehkegi"	Kishore Kumar & Lata Mangeshkar	4:20
3.	"Jaise Radha Ne Mala Japi" (Raga Bhairavi)	Lata Mangeshkar	3:58
4.	"Ta Thai Tat Thai" (Raga Jhinjhoti)	Asha Bhosle	4:51
5.	"Mera Sajan Phool Kamal Ka"	Asha Bhosle	4:57
6.	"Phur Ud Chala"	Asha Bhosle	3:30
7.	"Mere Antar Ek Mandir"	Lata Mangeshkar	3:39
8.	"Suno Re Suno"	Manna Dey	5:59
Total length:			35:00

== Reception ==
In 1971, a dispute occurred at the Kohinoor cinema in Dadar, when a Marathi film Songadya starring Dada Kondke was replaced with Tere Mere Sapne.

Unlike Anand's previous "Golden hits", Tere Mere Sapne did not do as well at the box office.

Among retrospective reviews, Farhana Farook writing for Filmfare called it one of Mumtaz's best performances. Hindustan Times included it in their list of Anand's top 10 films. Kamal Haasan who included it in his list of 70 favourite movies since 1947 stated, "The film stayed with me. This was romance in the early Seventies, but the kind of characters you saw in this film were rare at the time -- like the alcoholic doctor. At that time, one was aching for films that would come close to Erich Segal’s Love Story. And Tere Mere Sapne was different, despite being a typical Hindi film. I was not interested in Aradhana (1969). Later there were other different films like Rajnigandha (1974) but they didn’t change my perception. For me, Tere Mere Sapne became a primer to see better cinema. We graduated to better cinema because of such films. Otherwise, films by directors like Satyajit Ray would have remained boxes to tick off on a to-do list."
