= Nau Do Gyarah =

- Film poster
- Directed by: Vijay Anand
- Written by: Vijay Anand
- Screenplay by: Vijay Anand
- Story by: Vijay Anand
- Produced by: Dev Anand
- Starring: Dev Anand; Kalpana Kartik; Shashikala; Jeevan; Madan Puri; Lalita Pawar
- Cinematography: V. Ratra
- Edited by: Dharamvir
- Music by: S. D. Burman
- Production company: Navketan Films
- Distributed by: Navketan Films
- Release date: 1957
- Running time: 170 minutes
- Country: India
- Language: Hindi

Nau Do Gyarah (lit. 'Nine Two Eleven') (Note: The name is a clever pun on the Hindi idiom Nau Do Gyarah (wikt:नौ दो ग्यारह होना) which means "to run away." Another meaning is that the boy Madan Gopal is supposed to have inherited Rs nine [Nau] lakhs of property and two [do] lakhs worth of cash, and he runs away with a girl to get that inheritance. Nine plus two equals eleven. This reads together as Nau Do Gyarah, which refers to the latter act of the boy - running away) is a 1957 Indian Hindi-language comedy thriller film produced by Dev Anand. It also classifies as a road movie. This was his brother, Vijay Anand's directorial debut. Partly inspired by a 1934 American film It Happened One Night, the film stars Dev Anand, Kalpana Kartik, Madan Puri, Shashikala and Jeevan. The film's music is by S. D. Burman and the lyrics are by Majrooh Sultanpuri. It marked the final film appearance of Kalpana Kartik.

== Plot ==
The film starts with Madan Gopal being thrown out of his house for not paying the rent. He goes to visit his friend, who has been helping him collect his mail, and finds a letter from his uncle, Manoharlal. Manoharlal writes that he is willing to give eleven lakh rupees (nine lakhs of property and two lakhs worth of cash), to Madan. It was originally willed to his sister-in-law's son, Kuldeep. After seeing Kuldeep's bad behaviour, though, Manoharlal decides to give the money to Madan.

Madan promptly gets a truck and sets off for Bombay, and on the way, his friend drags him to a wedding. The two discuss the wedding, with Madan saying that if he were in the girl's place, he would run away. True enough, when an eavesdropping friend tells the bride, Raksha that the groom is Surjit, she decides to run away and hides in Madan's truck.

Raksha disguises herself as a Sikh boy with the pseudonym of "Sardar Nihal Singh" and hides in his truck. Madan discovers "him" and the two quarrel nonstop, but Madan is compelled to take him along, because the boy has money, food and water. The disguise soon comes loose and Sardar Nihal Singh is revealed to be a girl. Madan doesn't know her past, but the two of them fall in love, with Madan teasing her on several occasions, calling her a "thief". Raksha, who was unhappy with her marriage, finally finds happiness travelling with Madan.

When the two of them reach Bombay, Madan goes off to see his friend, Radheshyam, but is informed that Manoharlal has died. A shocked Madan takes out the letter and finds out that it is a few months old. Radheshyam says that all the property has gone to Kuldeep and his mother.

== Cast ==
- Dev Anand as Madan Gopal
- Kalpana Kartik as Raksha / Sardar Nihal Singh
- Jeevan as Surjit
- Madan Puri as Radheshyam "Radhey"
- Shashikala Jawalkar as Neeta
- Krishan Dhawan as Kuldeep
- Lalita Pawar as Kuldeep's mother
- Jagdish Raj as Inspector
- M. A. Latif as Raksha's father
- Helen as Dancer
- Rashid Khan as Kuldeep's servant
- Tun Tun as The Landlady
- Lata Sinha

== Production ==
Nau Do Gyarah was the first film directed by Vijay Anand.

== Soundtrack ==
All lyrics written by Majrooh Sultanpuri and music was scored by Sachin Dev Burman.

| Song | Singer |
|---|---|
| "Hum Hai Rahi Pyaar Ke, Humse Kuch Na Boliye" (Part 1) | Kishore Kumar |
| "Hum Hai Rahi Pyaar Ke, Humse Kuch Na Boliye" (Part 2 - snippet) | Kishore Kumar, Asha Bhosle |
| "Aankhon Mein Kya Ji, Roopehla Badal" | Kishore Kumar, Asha Bhosle |
| "Kali Ke Roop Mein Chali Ho Dhoop Mein Kahan" | Mohammed Rafi, Asha Bhosle |
| "Aaja, Panchhi Akela Hai, So Ja, Nindiya Ki Bela Hai" | Mohammed Rafi, Asha Bhosle |
| "Dhalki Jaye Chundariya" | Asha Bhosle |
| "Jaan-E-Jigar Hay Hay" | Asha Bhosle |
| "Kya Ho Phir Jo Din Rangeela Ho, Ret Chamke, Samundar Gila Ho" | Asha Bhosle, Geeta Dutt |
| "See Le Zubaan" | Geeta Dutt |
