= Dev Anand =

Indian actor and filmmaker (1923–2011)

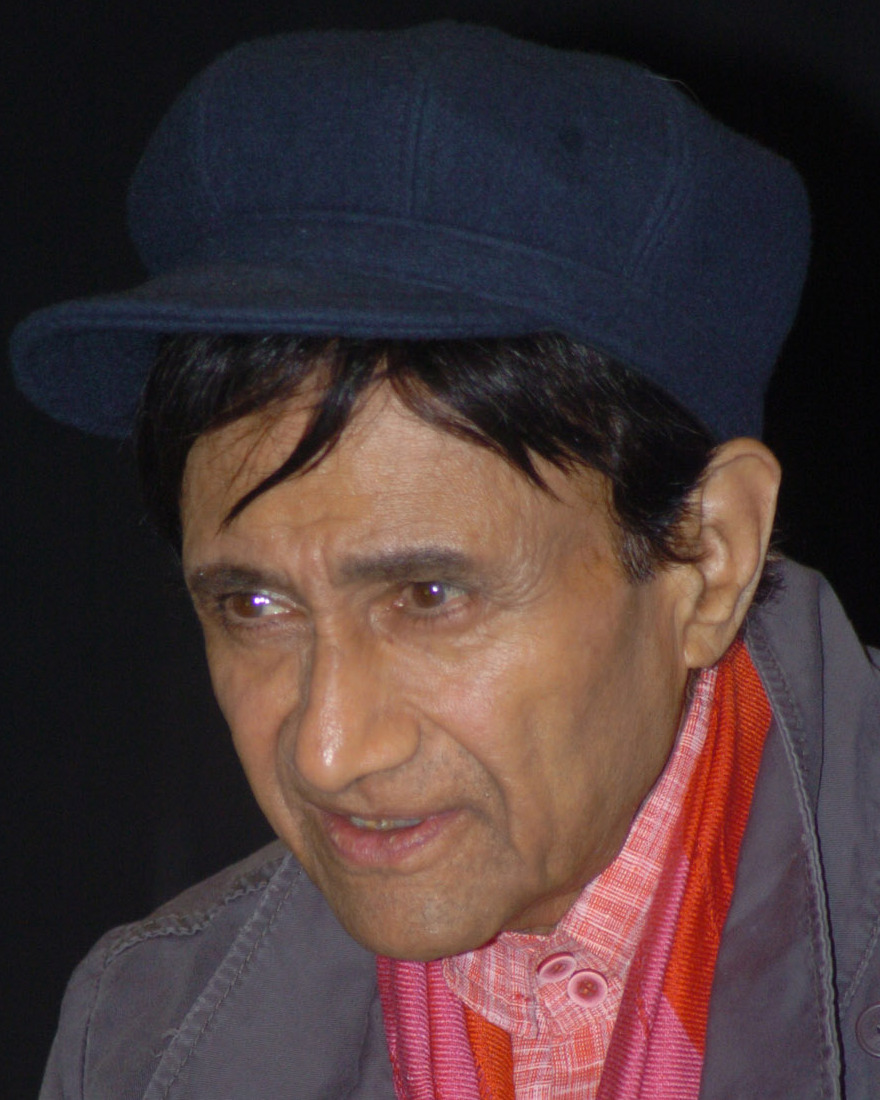
- Dev Anand, c. 2005
- Born: Dharamdev Pishorimal Anand; 26 September 1923; Shakargarh, Punjab, British India
- Died: 3 December 2011 (aged 88); London, England
- Other name: Evergreen Star
- Education: Government College, Lahore (BA)
- Occupations: Actor; producer; director; writer
- Years active: 1946–2011
- Organization: Navketan Films
- Works: Full list
- Spouse: Kalpana Kartik (m. 1954)
- Children: 2; including Suneil Anand
- Relatives: See Anand-Sahni family
- Awards: Full list
- Honors: Padma Bhushan (2001); Dadasaheb Phalke Award (2002)

Dev Anand (Hindi pronunciation: [de:u ǝna:nd]; born Dharamdev Pishorimal Anand; 26 September 1923 – 3 December 2011) was an Indian actor, writer, director and producer known for his work in Hindi cinema. He is considered as one of the greatest and most successful actors in the history of Indian cinema. Through a career that spanned over six decades, he worked in more than 100 films. Anand is a recipient of four Filmfare Awards, including two for Best Actor. The Government of India honoured him with Padma Bhushan, Indian third highest civilian honour in 2001 and with Dadasaheb Phalke Award in 2002.

In 1946, Anand debuted with a lead role in Prabhat Films's Hum Ek Hain, a film about Hindu-Muslim unity. He had his first commercial success in Ziddi (1948) and gained widespread recognition with the crime thriller Baazi (1951), which is regarded as the forerunner of the spate of "Bombay Noir" films that followed in Hindi cinema in the 1950s. He consistently starred in top–grossing Indian films from the early-1950s to the 1970s, such as Jaal, Taxi Driver, Insaniyat, C.I.D., Paying Guest, Kala Pani, Kala Bazar, Jab Pyar Kisi Se Hota Hai, Hum Dono, Asli-Naqli, Tere Ghar Ke Samne, Guide, Jewel Thief, Johny Mera Naam and Haré Rama Haré Krishna. Despite the arrival of new crop of stars in the latter-half of the 1970s and 1980s, Anand continued to star in highly successful films, such as Amir Garib, Warrant, Jaaneman, Des Pardes and Lashkar. Some of his most acclaimed performances, include Munimji, Funtoosh, Baarish, Nau Do Gyarah, Solva Saal, Manzil, Jaali Note, Baat Ek Raat Ki, Sharabi, Teen Devian, Duniya, Prem Pujari, Tere Mere Sapne, Heera Panna and Lootmaar. The 2011 film Chargesheet, which Anand also directed was his final film.

== Early life and family ==
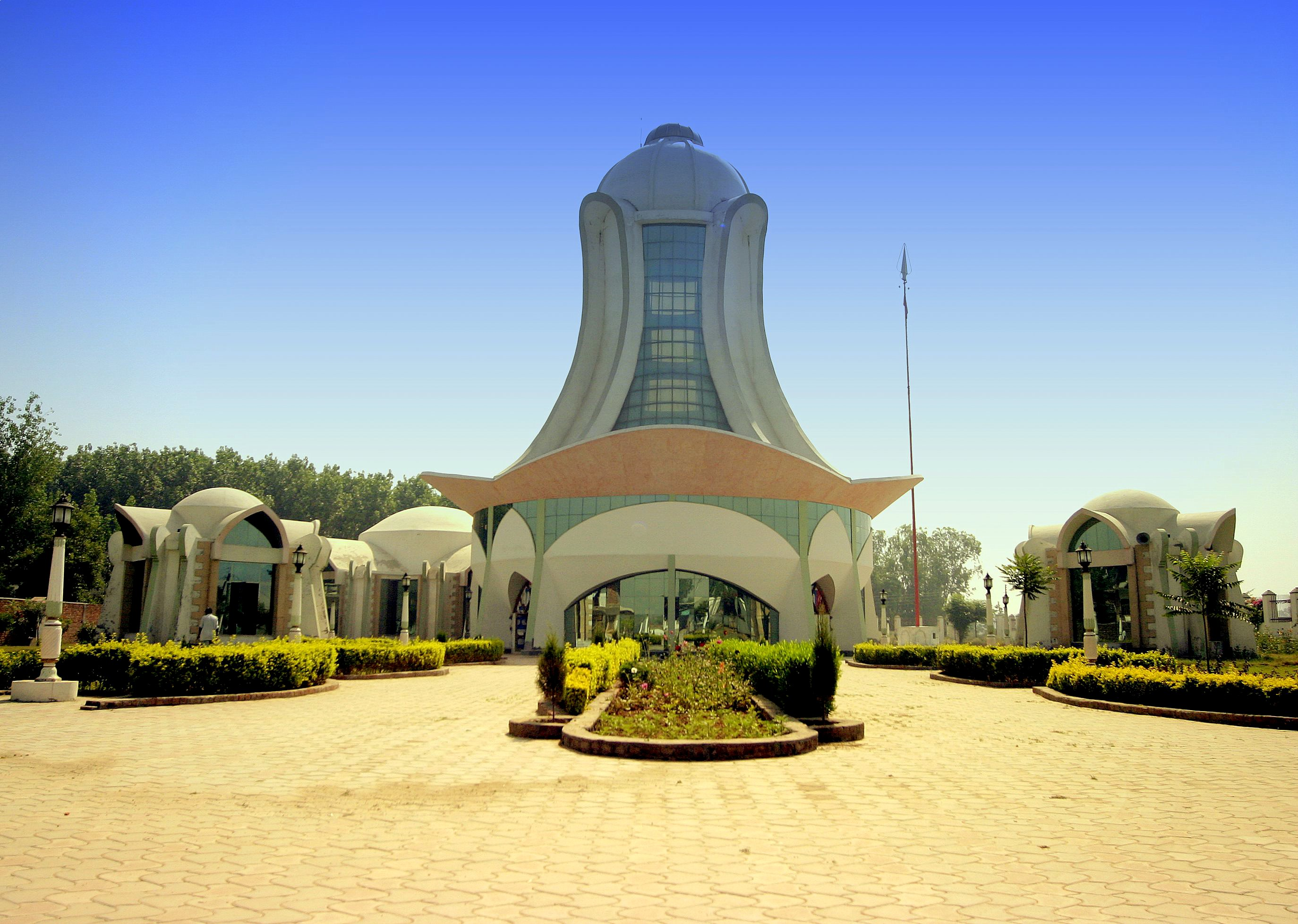
Dev Anand was born and brought up in Gurdaspur

Anand was born Dharamdev Pishorimal Anand on 26 September 1923 in the Shakargarh Tehsil of the Gurdaspur district in Punjab, British India (now Narowal District, Punjab, Pakistan).

His father Pishori Lal Anand was a prominent lawyer in Gurdaspur District Court. Pishori Lal Anand was also a freedom fighter and scholar affiliated with the Arya Samaj organisation, who would study world religions in different languages (the Bhagavad-Gita in Sanskrit, the Bible in Hebrew, the Qur'an in Arabic while he also knew Persian). His mother was Indravati.

Dev was the third of four sons born to Pishori Lal Anand. One of Dev's younger sisters Sheel Kanta Kapur, is the mother of film director Shekhar Kapur. His older brothers included Manmohan Anand (Advocate, Gurdaspur Dist. Court) and Chetan Anand, while Vijay Anand was his younger brother.

Anand did his schooling till matriculation from Sacred Heart School, Dalhousie (then in Punjab), and went to Government College Dharamshala before going to Lahore to study. Later Dev completed a B.A. degree in English Literature from the Government College, Lahore in British India. Part of the Anand family, he co-founded Navketan Films in 1949 with his elder brother Chetan Anand.

== Career ==
=== Career beginnings ===
After completing his BA degree in English literature from the Government College, Lahore (then in British India), Anand left his hometown for Bombay in the early 1940s. He began his career in the military censor's office at Churchgate, for a monthly salary of Rs. 65. Later, he worked as a clerk in an accounting firm for a salary of Rs. 85. He joined his older brother, Chetan, as a member of the Indian People's Theatre Association (IPTA). Anand aspired to become a performer after seeing Ashok Kumar's performance in films such as Achhut Kanya and Kismet. Anand quoted in an interview that "I remember when I gate-crashed into the office of the man who gave me the first break, he kept looking at me – Babu Rao Pai of Prabhat Film Studios. At that time he made up his mind that this boy deserves a break and later mentioned to his people that 'this boy struck me because of his smile and beautiful eyes and his tremendous confidence.'" Then he was soon offered the lead role in Prabhat Films' Hum Ek Hain (1946), a film about Hindu-Muslim unity, where Dev Anand played a Hindu boy and was paired opposite Kamala Kotnis. While shooting the film in Pune, Anand befriended the actor Guru Dutt. Between them, they agreed that if one of them were to become successful in the film industry, he would help the other also to be successful. They formed a mutual understanding that when Anand produced a film, Dutt would direct it and when Dutt directed a film, Anand would act in it.

=== Late 1940s: Breakthrough and romance with Suraiya ===
In the late 1940s, Anand was offered a few roles starring as the male lead opposite singer-actress Suraiya in woman-oriented films. While shooting these films, they became romantically involved. The two of them were paired in many films: Vidya (1948), Jeet (1949), Shair (1949), Afsar (1950), Nili (1950), Sanam and Do Sitare (1951). In these films, Suraiya was always the first biller in the credits, indicating that she was a bigger star than Anand. She fell in love with him during the shooting of the song "Kinare Kinare Chale Jayen Ge" from the film Vidya. While shooting the scene, the boat they were in capsized, and Anand saved Suraiya from drowning. Initially, Suraiya's family used to welcome Anand at home, but when her maternal grandmother found out that the two were in love, and even planned an actual marriage on the set of Jeet, she started monitoring them. The two shared love letters and messages through their co-actors, like Durga Khote and Kamini Kaushal, who went out of their way to engineer secret rendezvous. During the shooting of the film Afsar (1950), Anand finally proposed to Suraiya and gave her a diamond ring worth Rs 3,000. Her maternal grandmother opposed the relationship as they were Muslim and Anand was Hindu, so, Suraiya remained unmarried. They stopped acting together after her grandmother opposed their partnership, and Do Sitare was the last film in which they appeared together. Although the films he starred in with Suraiya had been successful, the producers and directors of those films attributed their success to the acting prowess and screen presence of Suraiya. Anand began looking for an opportunity to play the main male lead in a film where his acting skills could be demonstrated, so as to dispel scepticism about his acting abilities.

Dev Anand often spoke about Suraiya and his love affair with her, in various interviews, he gave to film magazines, such as Stardust (June 1972 issue), Star & Style (Feb 1987 issue) and TV to Karan Thapar for BBC (2002), while both were alive and after Suraiya's death in interviews given on TV to Simi Garewal (Rendezvous with Simi Garewal) and others on TV and for news magazines.

=== 1950s: Stardom ===
Anand was offered his first big break by Ashok Kumar. He spotted Anand hanging around in the studios and picked him as the hero for the Bombay Talkies production Ziddi (1948), co-starring Kamini Kaushal, which became an instant success. After Ziddi's success, Anand decided that he would start producing films. It was in the film Ziddi, that the first ever Kishore-Lata duet, "Yeh Kaun Aaya Karke Yeh Sola Singhar", was recorded. This duet was an instant hit, and from here on both playback singers' associations with Dev Anand began. This continued for the next four decades. His association with Kishore Kumar started when the former sang the first solo of his playback singing career, "Marne Ki Duayen", which was picturised on Dev Anand in the movie Ziddi. Dev had forged a very strong bond of friendship with Kishore Kumar during the making of the film. In 1949, he launched his own company Navketan Films (named after his elder brother Chetan's son Ketan and which means "New Banner"), which, as of 2011, has produced 35 films. Nirala (1950), a commercial success, saw him being paired opposite Madhubala for the first time, with whom he would later form a popular pair.

Dev chose Guru Dutt as director for the crime thriller, Baazi (1951). The film, starring Dev Anand, Geeta Bali, and Kalpana Kartik was a trendsetter, regarded as the forerunner of the spate of urban crime films that followed in Bollywood in the 1950s. The film Baazi saw the debut of Kalpana Kartik (aka Mona Singha) as the lead female actress and Guru Dutt as a director. The collaboration was a success at the box office and the duo of Dev Anand and Kalpana Kartik were offered many films to star in together. They signed all the film offers and subsequently the movies Aandhiyan (1952), Taxi Driver (1954), House No. 44 (1955) and Nau Do Gyarah (1957) went on to become big hits too. During the making of the film Taxi Driver, the couple fell in love and Dev proposed marriage to his heroine Kalpana. In 1954, Taxi Driver was declared a hit and the two decided to marry in a quiet ceremony. The couple had a son, Suneil Anand in 1956 and later a daughter, Devina, was born. After her marriage, Kalpana decided not to pursue her acting career further. Nau Do Gyarah was the couple's last movie together.

A rapid-fire style of dialogue delivery and a penchant for nodding while speaking became Dev's style in films such as Baazi (1951), Jaal (1952), House No. 44 (1955), Pocket Maar (1956), Munimji (1955), Funtoosh (1956), C.I.D. (1956) and Paying Guest (1957). In the 1950s his films were of the mystery genre or light comedy love stories or were films with social relevance such as Ek Ke Baad Ek (1959) and Funtoosh (1956). His style was lapped up by the audience and was widely imitated. He starred in a string of box office successes for the remainder of the 1950s opposite newcomer Waheeda Rehman in C.I.D. (1956), Solva Saal (1958), Kala Bazar (1960) and Baat Ek Raat Ki (1962). Waheeda first became a star when C.I.D became a hit. In 1955, he co-starred with Dilip Kumar in the blockbuster actioner Insaniyat. With his acting in the box office success Kala Pani (1958) opposite Madhubala and Nalini Jaywant, as the son who is willing to go to any lengths to clear his framed father's name, he won his first Filmfare award for Best Actor for the film. He attempted films of tragic genre occasionally, such as Pocket Maar (1956), Kala Pani (1958), Bombai Ka Baboo (1960) and Sharabi (1964) and tasted success with them. Dev also played a few characters with a negative shade, as in Jaal (1952) where he played a smuggler, then as an absconding gang member in Dushman (1957), and as a black marketer in Kala Bazar. Apart from his pairing with Suraiya and Kalpana Kartik, his pairing with Nutan, Waheeda Rehman and Geeta Bali was popular among the audiences in the late 50s and 60s. His films Rahi (1952) and Aandhiyan (1952), were screened along with Raj Kapoor's Awaara. From the early fifties till the mid-sixties, the trio of actors Dilip Kumar, Raj Kapoor, and Anand ruled the roost.

=== 1960s: Romantic hero image ===
In the sixties, Dev Anand acquired a romantic image with films such as Manzil and Tere Ghar Ke Samne with Nutan, Kinare Kinare with Meena Kumari, Maya with Mala Sinha, Asli-Naqli with Sadhana Shivdasani, Jab Pyar Kisi Se Hota Hai, Mahal with Asha Parekh and Teen Deviyaan opposite three heroines Kalpana, Simi Garewal and Nanda. In the film Teen Deviyaan, Dev Anand played a playboy. One of his notable films of the early sixties was Hum Dono (1961) which he produced and acted in, as Anand, a young lover who joins the army in frustration over being shunned by the father of his love Meeta (played by Sadhana Shivdasani). Anand played a double role in the film, also acting as Major Varma, his look-alike who he runs into in the army and forms a deep friendship. Notable for its music by Jaidev, the film was a box office hit.

His first colour film, Guide with Waheeda Rehman was based on the novel of the same name by R. K. Narayan. Dev Anand himself was the impetus for making the film version of the book. He met and persuaded Narayan to give his assent to the project. Dev Anand tapped his friends in Hollywood to launch an Indo-US co-production that was shot in Hindi and English simultaneously and was released in 1965. Guide, directed by younger brother Vijay Anand, was an acclaimed movie. Dev played Raju, a voluble guide, who supports Rosy (Waheeda) in her bid for freedom. He is not above thoughtlessly exploiting her for personal gains. Combining style with substance, he gave an affecting performance as a man grappling with his emotions in his passage through love, shame, and salvation.

He reunited with Vijay Anand for the movie Jewel Thief (1967), based on the thriller genre which featured Vyjayanthimala, Tanuja, Anju Mahendru, Faryal and Helen and was very successful. Their next collaboration, Johny Mera Naam (1970), again a thriller, in which Dev was paired opposite Hema Malini was a huge blockbuster. It was Johnny Mera Naam which made Hema Malini a big star.

In 1969, he was a member of the jury at the 6th Moscow International Film Festival.

=== 1970s: Directorial debut ===
Dev Anand's directorial debut, the espionage drama Prem Pujari, was a flop but has developed a cult following over the years. The film introduced Zaheeda and had Waheeda Rehman as the female lead. He tasted success with his 1971 directorial effort Hare Rama Hare Krishna, shot primarily in Nepal around Swyambhunath, and Bhaktapur, in which talks about the prevalent hippie culture. His find Zeenat Aman, who played the mini-skirt-sporting, pot-smoking Janice, became an overnight sensation. Anand also became known as a filmmaker of trenchantly topical themes. The same year, he starred with Mumtaz in Tere Mere Sapne, an adaptation of A. J. Cronin's novel The Citadel. The film was directed by Dev's brother, Vijay, and was also successful. In 1971 he paired again with Zaheeda in Gambler which went on to become a success.

In the 1970s, Raj Kapoor started playing roles of father in films such as Kal Aaj Aur Kal in 1971 and Dharam Karam in 1974 and had put on a lot of weight and films with Dilip Kumar as a lead hero like Dastaan and Bairaag were failures at the box office. Some of the hurriedly made films with Dev Anand as the leading man—two each opposite Hema Malini – Shareef Badmaash, Joshila and two with Zeenat Aman – Ishk Ishk Ishk, Prem Shastra and Saheb Bahadur with Priya Rajvansh — became flops and posed a threat to his career as a leading man. He bounced back with the double-role film Banarasi Babu in 1973. He delivered commercial hits again with young heroines like with Sharmila Tagore in Yeh Gulistan Hamara (1972), with Yogeeta Bali and Raakhee in Banarasi Babu (1973), with Hema Malini in Chhupa Rustam (1973) and Amir Garib (1974), with Zeenat Aman in Heera Panna (1973), Warrant (1975), Kalabaaz (1977) and Darling Darling (1977) and with Parveen Babi in Bullet (1976). The presence of his discoveries in the 1970s—Zeenat, and later Tina Munim, in films and his good on-screen chemistry with beautiful young stars such as Raakhee, Parveen Babi, Hema Malini and Zeenat Aman in various films boosted Anand's image as the evergreen star even though he was well into his fifties. He attempted different genres of films to acquire versatile hero images. He was already 55 when he was paired with Tina Munim in 1978 in Des Pardes, which became among the top five-grossing films of the year.

=== Political activism during the Emergency in the late 1970s ===
Dev Anand has also been politically active. He led a group of film personalities who stood up against the Internal Emergency imposed by the then Prime Minister of India, Indira Gandhi. He actively campaigned against her with his supporters in the Indian parliamentary elections in 1977. He also formed a party called the National Party of India, which he later disbanded.

=== Later career and an evergreen hero ===
The 1978 hit Des Pardes, directed by Dev Anand was the debut movie of actress Tina Munim and this film's success gave him the tag of the Evergreen Star. Dev Anand was offered the lead role in Man Pasand by director Basu Chatterjee. Dev Anand's successful run at the box office continued in the 1980s with Man Pasand, Lootmaar (both opposite Tina Munim), and Swami Dada (1982), all being critically acclaimed and box office hits.

Though Dev Anand's demand as the lead hero had not decreased even in the 1980s, he decided that it was the right time to introduce his son Suneil Anand in films as the hero. He launched his son in the Kramer vs. Kramer-inspired Anand Aur Anand (1984), which was produced and directed by Dev Anand himself and had music by R.D. Burman. He expected the film to do well, but the film was a box office disaster, and Suneil Anand decided not to act in films any more.

But films with Dev Anand as the lead hero in Hum Naujawan (1985) and Lashkar (1989) continued to be box office successes and were appreciated by critics. He was already 60 years old in 1983 when he acted opposite Christine O'Neil and alongside Rati Agnihotri and Padmini Kolhapure in Swami Dada. In 1989, his directorial venture Sachche ka Bolbala was released. Though critically acclaimed, it was a commercial failure. His performance as Professor Anand in the 1989 film Lashkar was widely appreciated and was a major success at the box office. Lashkar was his last hit film in the lead role in 1989, with him neither producer nor director of the film.

He directed Pyar Ka Tarana in 1993, without casting himself in any role. His directorial movie Gangster (1995) had a controversial nude rape scene and the movie was released uncut. He received offers to star in the lead roles outside of his home banners in films like Return of Jewel Thief and Aman Ke Farishtey but the former was not successful at the box office and the latter wasn't released in 1993 though the film was fully ready to be released.

Since 1992, seven of his directorial ventures were box office failures. His last film Chargesheet (2011) was panned by critics across the board and was a box office flop.

He also starred in English films such as The Evil Within (1970), where he was paired opposite Vietnamese actress Kieu Chinh and Zeenat Aman and Guide (English Version). The English language film The Evil Within was a 20th-Century Fox production that couldn't get the nod from the concerned authorities due to its parallel track dealing with opium selling and thus the Indian viewers were deprived of this American venture. Of the 114 Hindi films, he appeared in, over 6 decades, Kahin Aur Chal (1968) had a delayed release in the early 1970s and the multi-starrer film Ek Do Teen Chaar (1980) remained unreleased and Shrimanji (1968) had him in a guest appearance. By 2011, he had the second most solo lead roles in Hindi films— 92, with Rajesh Khanna having the record for the most films as the solo lead hero in Hindi films – 106.

== Production ==
Dev Anand has produced 35 films. Of the 35 films he produced, 18 were commercially successful at the box office. He wrote the stories for 13 of his films. Anand's films are well known for their hit songs. He is known to have been an active participant in the music sessions of a number of his films. His association with music composers Shankar-Jaikishen, O. P. Nayyar, Kalyanji-Anandji, Sachin Dev Burman and his son Rahul Dev Burman, lyricists Hasrat Jaipuri, Majrooh Sultanpuri, Gopaldas Neeraj, Shailendra, Anand Bakshi, and playback singers Kishore Kumar, Mohammed Rafi and Hemant Kumar produced some very popular songs. Guru Dutt, Kishore Kumar, Mohammed Rafi, Pran, Dilip Kumar, Raj Kapoor, Sunil Dutt, Nargis, Vyjayanthimala, S.D. Burman, Shammi Kapoor and R.D. Burman were his closest friends from the film industry.

Anand is credited with giving actors such as Zarina Wahab in Ishk Ishk Ishk (1974), Jackie Shroff in Swami Dada (1982), Tabu in Hum Naujawan (1985) and Richa Sharma (Sanjay Dutt's first wife) a break in the film industry, discovering Zeenat Amaan, Tina Munim and encouraging music composer Rajesh Roshan. Amit Khanna started his career with Navketan as executive producer in 1971 and had been secretary to Dev Anand in the 1970s. He adds, "The uniqueness of Navketan today is that it's the only film company in the world still run by the one who started it." Shatrughan Sinha disclosed in an interview that it was Dev Anand who gave him a break in films by giving him a role in Prem Pujari and since Dev had given Sinha a very small role in that film, he compensated for it by giving Sinha another role in his next film Gambler. Sinha quoted: "Later on we worked together in Sharif Badmash and it was really a privilege to work with him". It was under Dev Anand's banner where Dev launched actors Jackie Shroff, Zaheera, Zaheeda Hussain, Zarina Wahab, Natasha Sinha, Ekta Sohini, Mink Brar and Sabrina.

== Personal life ==
Anand was in a relationship with actress Suraiya for four years from 1948 to 1951. Anand nicknamed Suraiya "Nosey", while to Suraiya, Dev Anand was "Steve", a name chosen from a book Dev Anand had given her. Suraiya also called Anand "Devina" and he called her "Suraiyana", while faking an Italian accent. During the shooting of Jeet (1949), both Anand and Suraiya, had made plans for marriage and elopement, but were unsuccessful due to the opposition from Suraiya's maternal grandmother and maternal uncle. In the 'Star and Style' interview, Suraiya said that she gave in only when both her grandmother and her maternal uncle threatened to get Dev Anand killed. Suraiya and Anand were stopped from acting together after their last film in 1951 by her grandmother. In an interview with Stardust, in June 1972, Suraiya revealed that she lacked the courage to resist her family and that Anand truly loved her. Anand wanted her to be bold and marry him in a civil court, but she refused. Suraiya remained unmarried throughout her life till she died on 31 January 2004. In his auto-biography, Anand said Suraiya was his "first true love". When Suraiya died in 2004, Anand hid from the media in his terrace, because he wanted to be away from the media.

Dev Anand was broken after the relationship ended. In 1954, Anand married Kalpana Kartik, an actress from Shimla, in a private marriage during the shooting of the film Taxi Driver. They have two children, son Suneil Anand (30 June 1956 – 26 July 2026) and daughter Devina Anand.

== Death ==
Anand died in his room at The Washington Mayfair Hotel in London at age of 88 on 3 December 2011 of a cardiac arrest. His death came just two months after the release of his last film Chargesheet, which he directed and produced. Anand was reportedly in London for a medical checkup at the time of his death. On 10 December, his funeral service was held at a small chapel in London after which his coffin was taken to the Putney Vale Crematorium in southwest London. His ashes were returned to India for immersion burial in the Godavari River.

== Public image ==
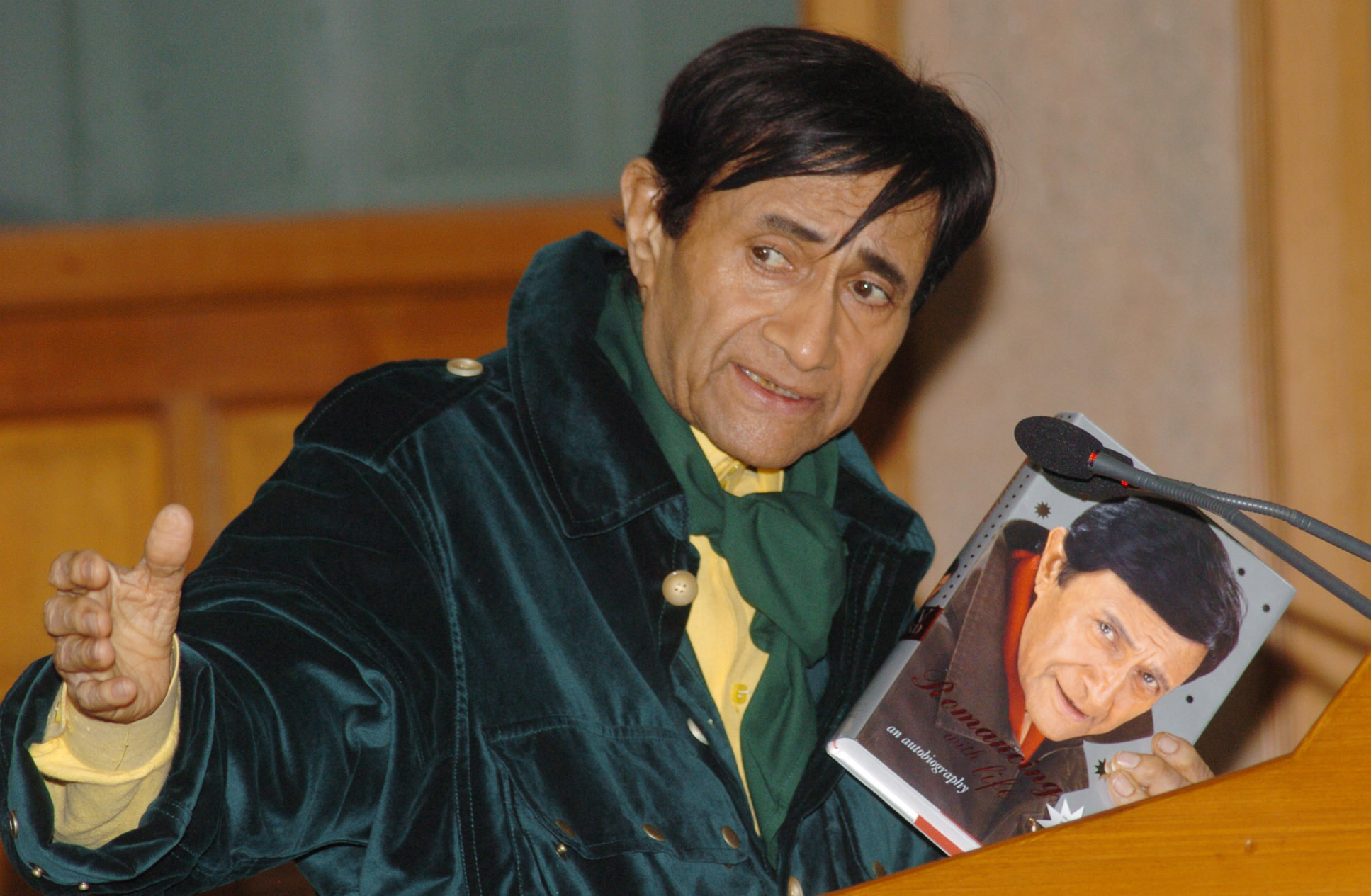
Anand at his autobiography Romancing with Life launch, 2007

Anand is regarded as one of the greatest actors of Indian cinema. He is noted for the diverse roles he played and for his personal charm. One of the highest paid Indian actors from the 1950s to early 1970s, Anand appeared in Box Office India's "Top Actors" list sixteen times (1948, 1951–1963, 1970–1971), and he ranked seventh among the "Greatest Bollywood Stars" in a 2013 UK poll celebrating 100 years of Indian cinema. He was also a part of the "Trinity – The Golden Trio" (along with Raj Kapoor and Dilip Kumar). In 2013, he was named as one of "the men who changed the face of the Indian Cinema" by CNN-News18. In 2022, he was listed in Outlook India's "75 Best Bollywood Actors" list.

Anand was widely known as the "first fashion icon" of Bollywood. He made fashion statements with his scarves, mufflers and jackets and his signature puff, and many film actors and fashion designers have taken inspiration from his style. Filmfare place him third in its "Bollywood's most stylish men" list. Commenting on his style, Rachel Dwyer said, "Dev Anand's offscreen persona was that of the modern Indian citizen created by the new state of India. Onscreen, he often appeared as himself from film to film, with his distinctive hair puff and stylish western clothes – the look was often similar, well-suited to an urban and urbane hero, he played a wide variety of roles convincingly." After the film Kaala Paani, there was a period when Anand did not wear black in public. In September 2007, Dev Anand's autobiography Romancing with Life was released at a birthday party with the Indian Prime Minister Dr. Manmohan Singh.

== Artistry and legacy ==
=== Acting style and reception ===
Anand is considered as one of the greatest actors in Indian cinema. Anand played the leading man from the 1940s until the 1980s and was known for his strong roles. He was known for playing roles in diverse genres — from romantic dramas to actions and thrillers to musical dramas. Anupama Chopra termed Anand the "most dashing hero", Indian cinema has ever seen and added, "The nodding head, flopping arms, casual charm inspired a legion of actors. Yet, in 77 years, Dev Saab hasn't had a true successor." Although Anand was mainly a romantic actor, he also played complicated, compromised characters. Anand's film Baazi is regarded as the forerunner of the spate of "Bombay Noir." He later appeared in many thrillers like C.I.D, Kala Pani, Jaal, Jewel Thief and Hare Rama Hare Krishna. On this, filmmaker Sriram Raghavan said, "Much before Amitabh Bachchan and Shah Rukh Khan, much more than Dilip Kumar and Raj Kapoor, it was Dev Anand's bold film choices that shaped what is called the Bombay noir."

Devesh Sharma of Filmfare termed him a "debonair hero" and noted, "His true matinee idol good looks, suave demeanor and charismatic screen presence made his fans swoon every time he came on screen." Subhash K. Jha of Firstpost called him the "most easygoing superstar cinema has ever known" and said, "Dev Anand symbolized the most dazzling bastion of Hindi cinema. He was flamboyant, debonair, mischievous and romantic." Shekhar Gupta of The Print said, "Nobody could match Dev Anand for style." He added, "Many of his films were ahead of his time. But you always walked out of the sultry small-town hall copying Dev Anand's leaning-tower gait, his mannerism, and always hummed his songs." Journalist Rauf Ahmed added Anand on his "Biggest stars in Hindi filmdom" list and noted, "For almost five decades Anand has continued to fascinate his fans with his never-say-die spirit and flamboyance. He is one actor for whom time has had the courtesy to stand still." Saibal Chatterjee of The Tribune noted, "There is nobody quite like Dev Anand. A timeless Bollywood icon, an eternal dreamer and a man of action, his creative life has never known anything akin to a full stop." Siddharth Bhatia said, "Anand's various roles – whether in the black-and-white 1950s, when he usually played a down-at-heel cabbie or con artist, or in the 1960s when he matured, and even later – were all marked with a can-do spirit; maudlin self-pity was not his style."

=== Comparison with Gregory Peck and John Wayne ===
Anand was often compared to the famous Hollywood actor Gregory Peck. Anand said that he didn't feel ecstatic hearing the tagline bestowed on him in his heyday. "When you are at an impressionable age you make idols, but when you grow out of the phase, you develop your own persona. I don't want to be known as India's Gregory Peck, I am Dev Anand". Acquainted with the Bollywood actor, Peck's personal interactions with him spanned four to five long meetings in Europe and Mumbai.

Dev Anand and Suraiya met Peck for the first time at Bombay's Willingdon Club, after the Filmfare Awards in 1954. He knew of the "Indian Star" as an actor, more so probably because his romance with Suraiya was grabbing the headlines. The second time they met was in Rome when Dev Anand was on his way back from the Venice Film Festival, and they exchanged pleasantries. The third meeting was in London on the set of Moby Dick. However, Suraiya asked for an exclusive meeting with her idol at her house. Though Anand says jealousy was natural for anyone in love, he didn't mind that he was not invited. "I didn't quite feel anything. It wasn't as if they were going to fall in love or make love. Even if they would have, it wouldn't have mattered. I was mature enough. Moreover, he wasn't my rival. I too was a big star by then," says Anand.

Journalist Jawed Naqvi wrote, "Often called India's Gregory Peck for his debonair looks, Anand's signature scarf and stylised acting brought him closer in demeanour to John Wayne."

=== Criticism of the later years ===
Although Dev Anand remained one of Hindi cinema’s most enduring personalities, critics frequently observed limitations in his acting and filmmaking, especially in his later years. In terms of acting, Anand increasingly "kept playing himself" as the lead actor, including the romantic hero romancing actresses considered too young for him, and tending to repeat earlier mannerisms, with his trademark tilted head and quick, emphatic nod, often combined with a spontaneous smile and rapid-fire dialogue delivery, rather than adapt to evolving cinematic styles, while Anand’s self-directed films from the 1980s onward suffered from dated storytelling and a lack of narrative discipline, as he too often relied on an idealistic and sentimental approach to storytelling, and his writing had become disconnected from audience expectations and modern narrative sensibilities. However, in a 2023 Times of India retrospective, film critic Jai Arjun Singh assessed Dev Anand’s career by stressing that both his acclaimed and his lesser-regarded works are essential to understanding his artistic persona. He argued that Anand’s filmography, ranging from thoughtful classics to eccentric or uneven projects, reveals the "restless creative energy" that defined him, and that even his "silly" or flawed films illuminate his instinct for experimentation, refusal to stagnate, and commitment to cinema as a lifelong pursuit. Anand’s work must thus be viewed as a whole, not separated into "good" or "bad", because it collectively reflects his enduring cultural and cinematic significance.

== Accolades ==
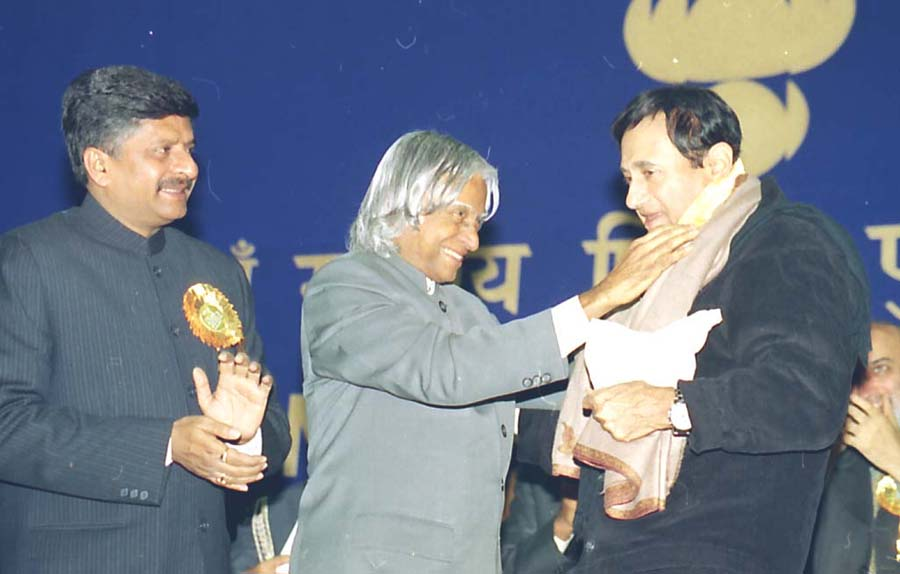
Anand being awarded the Dadasaheb Phalke Award, 2003

=== National Film Awards ===
Year	Award	Category	Work	Result	Ref.
1965	13th National Film Awards	Third Best Feature Film in Hindi	Guide	Won	
2002	Dadasaheb Phalke Award	Outstanding contribution to Indian cinema	—N/a	Honoured	

=== Other recognitions ===
- 1998 – Lifetime Achievement Award by the Ujala Anandlok Film Awards Committee in Calcutta.
- 1999 – Sansui Lifetime Achievement Award for his "Immense Contribution to Indian Cinema" in New Delhi.
- 2000 – Film Goers' Mega Movie Maestro of the Millennium Award in Mumbai.
- In July 2000, in New York City, he was honoured by an Award from the hands of the then First Lady of the United States of America, Hillary Clinton, for his "Outstanding Contribution to Indian Cinema".
- In 2000, he was awarded the Indo-American Association "Star of the Millennium" Award in Silicon Valley, California.
- 2001 – Evergreen Star of the Millennium Award at the Zee Gold Bollywood Awards on 28 April 2001 at the Nassau Coliseum, New York.
- 2004 – Legend of Indian Cinema Award at Atlantic City (United States).
- 2004 – Living Legend Award by the Federation of Indian Chamber of Commerce and Industry (FICCI) in recognition of his contribution to the Indian entertainment industry.
- 2005 – Sony Gold Award.
- In 2005, he was honoured with a "Special National Film Award" by the Government of Nepal at Nepal's first National Indian film festival in Stockholm.
- 2006 – Glory of India Award by IIAF, London.
- 2008 – Lifetime Achievement Award by Ramya Cultural Academy in association with Vinmusiclub.
- 2008 – Lifetime Achievement Award by Rotary Club of Bombay.
- 2008 – Awarded at the IIJS Solitaire Awards.
- 2009 – Legend Award given to Dev Anand by Rajinikanth.
- 2010 – Rashtriya Gaurav Award.
- 2011 – Rashtriya Kishore Kumar Samman from the Government of Madhya Pradesh.
- 2013 – Lifetime Achievement Maestro Award by the Whistling Woods International Institute.

== Honours and tributes ==
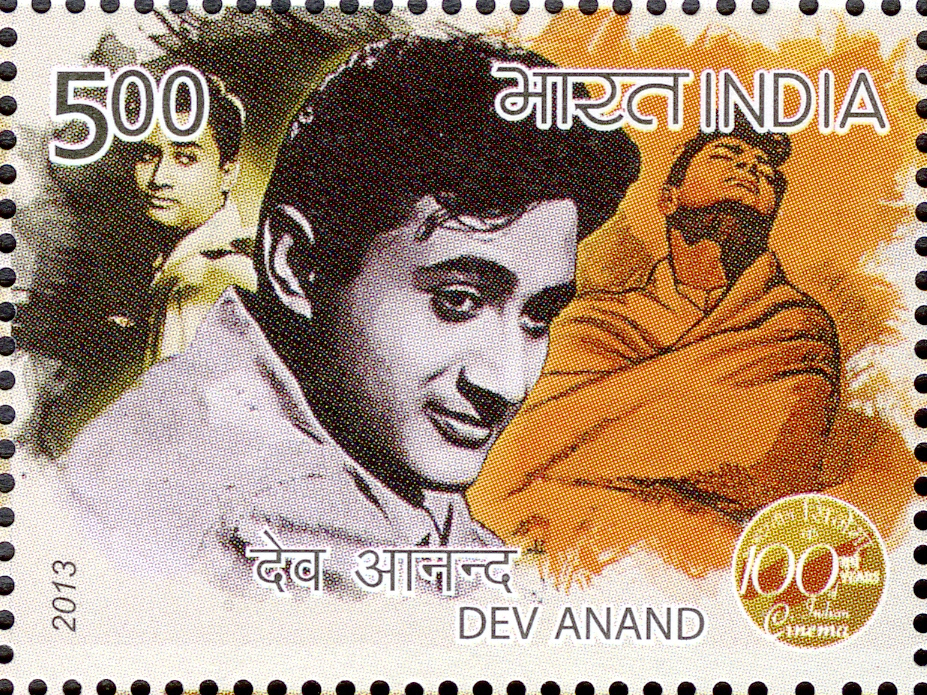
Anand on a 2013 stamp of India

On the occasion of 100 years of Indian cinema, a postage stamp bearing his image and likeness was released by India Post to honour him on 3 May 2013. In Anand's honour, a brass statue was unveiled at Walk of the Stars at Bandra Bandstand, along with his autograph, in February 2013. In 2016, Bhaichand Patel wrote about Dev Anand in his book Bollywood's Top 20: Superstars of Indian Cinema.

Several actors have been inspired by Anand's work and fondly remembers him. Actor Rajesh Khanna called him his "inspiration" and said, "I was an ardent admirer of Dev Anand from my teens. I was highly inspired by his acting style. Dev Anand was my inspiration, my idol." Actress Mala Sinha said, "Devsaab was the romantic idol of Indian youth. He paired successfully opposite every leading lady of his period." Talking about his stardom, actress Asha Parekh said, "The only stardom I've seen seem that is comparable with Rajesh Khanna is Dev Anand. Deewane the fans Dev Saab ke." ("Fans were crazy about Dev Anand")

Various film festivals have given tribute to Dev Anand. In 2011, Bengaluru International Film Festival and in 2023, Kolkata International Film Festival organised event and screened Anand's films. A three-day weekend retrospective of five of Anand's biggest 1960s hits, was organised by the Directorate of Film Festivals in 2005. A garden named "Sadabhaar Dev Anand Udyan", after the actor was inaugurated by his son in Mahavir Jain Vidyalaya, Mumbai. In 2023, to mark Anand's 100th birthday on 26 September, Film Heritage Foundation and National Film Archive of India, in collaboration with PVR INOX, presented "Dev Anand@100 – Forever Young" – a weekend festival of four Dev Anand milestone films in cinemas in 30 cities and 58 cinemas across India on 23 and 24 September. In 2023, an exhibition at Kiran Nadar Museum of Art in Noida, named "Sitaare Zameen Par", had portraits of Anand that were captured by JH Thakkar.

== In popular culture ==
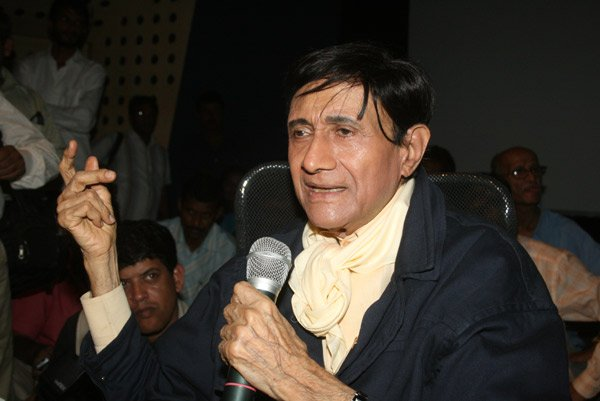
Anand in 2011

=== In film ===
- In Aditya Chopra's 2008 film Rab Ne Bana Di Jodi's song "Phir Milenge Chalte Chalte", actor Shah Rukh Khan dressed himself as Anand and acted his famous hand gestures, as a tribute to Anand.
- In February 2011, his 1961 black-and-white film Hum Dono was digitised, colourised and re-released.
- National Film Archive of India, Pune added Dev Anand's 1953 film Rahi to its collection in 2021.

=== Biographies ===
- The first biography was written in 2004, titled Dev Anand - Dashing, Debonair, by Alpana Chowdhury.
- In 2007, Anand wrote his auto-biography titled Romancing with Life. It has been described as the "first ever full-fledged memoir by a leading Bollywood star."
- In 2017, two biographies were written - firstly, The Dev Anand Story, written by Dr. Govind Sharma IAS Retd. and then, Dev Eternal Anand, written by Trinetra Bajpai and Anshula Bajpai.
- Another biography, Dev Saab: A Journey with the legend Dev Anand, was written by Vijay Kumar in 2018.
