= Taxi Driver (1954 film) =

1954 film

- Poster
- Directed by: Chetan Anand
- Screenplay by: Chetan Anand
- Story by: Uma Anand; Vijay Anand
- Produced by: Dev Anand
- Starring: Dev Anand; Kalpana Kartik; Sheila Ramani; Johnny Walker
- Cinematography: V. Ratra
- Edited by: M. D. Jadhav Rao
- Music by: S. D. Burman (Won Filmfare Best Music Director Award in 1954 for this film)
- Production company: Navketan Films
- Release date: 1954
- Country: India
- Language: Hindi

Taxi Driver is a 1954 Indian Hindi-language romantic musical film produced by Navketan Films. The film was directed by Chetan Anand and stars his brother Dev Anand, along with Kalpana Kartik, Sheila Ramani and Johnny Walker.

The film was written by Chetan himself, along with his wife Uma Anand and his other brother Vijay Anand. The film's music director was S. D. Burman and the lyrics were written by Sahir Ludhianvi.

== Plot ==
Mangal (Dev Anand) is a taxi driver who is called "Hero" by his friends because of his altruistic habits. He is a driver who drives a cab by day, then at night listens to the seductive club dancer Sylvie (Sheila Ramani) who has feelings for him. One day, while assisting another taxi driver, Mangal comes to the assistance of a damsel in distress, Mala (Kalpana Kartik), who is being molested by two thugs. Mangal gallantly rescues her, and attempts to take her to her destination, but to no avail, as the person she is looking for is Ratanlal, a music director, and he has moved out. The next day, Mangal and Mala again attempt to seek Ratanlal but the entire day is spent in vain. Mala starts living in Mangal's tiny apartment and both become attracted to each other. When Mala finds out about Sylvie, she decides to leave him. He goes in search of her, but in vain. Meanwhile, Ratanlal hires Mangal's taxi to go to some place. Due to certain circumstances, Mala returns to Mangal. Mangal takes Mala to Ratanlal's place and she is accepted there. Subsequently, she becomes a famous singer with the help of her music director friend.

Will Mangal ever get a chance to tell about his love for Mala? What will Sylvie's reaction be?

== Trivia ==
Dev Anand's taxi in the movie was a 1947 Chevrolet Fleetmaster 4-Door Sport Sedan.

== Reception ==
The film was ranked third among the Top 10 Earners at the Box Office in 1954.

== Cast ==
- Dev Anand as Mangal "Hero"
- Kalpana Kartik as Mala
- Sheila Ramani as Sylvie
- Johnny Walker as Mastana
- Krishan Dhawan as Gambler
- M. A. Latif as Mr. D'Mello
- Sarita Devi as Mangal's sister-in-law
- Uma Anand

== Soundtrack ==
All film songs were composed by S. D. Burman and the lyrics were penned by Sahir Ludhianvi.

Song	Singer	Raga
"Chahe Koi Khush Ho"	Kishore Kumar	
"Ae Meri Zindagi, Aaj Raat Jhum Le"	Lata Mangeshkar	
"Dil Se Milake Dil"	Lata Mangeshkar	
"Dil Jale To Jale"	Lata Mangeshkar	
"Jayen To Jayen Kahan"	Lata Mangeshkar	Jaunpuri
"Jayen To Jayen Kahan"	Talat Mahmood	Jaunpuri
"Jeene Do Aur Jeeo"	Asha Bhosle	
"Dekho Maane Nahin Roothi Haseena"	Asha Bhosle, Jagmohan Bakshi	

Chahe Koi Khush Ho adapts the traditional Italian folk tune featured in the 1852 opera song Tarantella Napoletana (1852).

== Awards ==
- Filmfare Best Music Director Award for Sachin Dev Burman – for the Talat Mehmood version of the song- "Jayen To Jayen Kahan"- This song was also the second song to top the then popular Binaca Geetmala.
