= Dev Anand filmography =

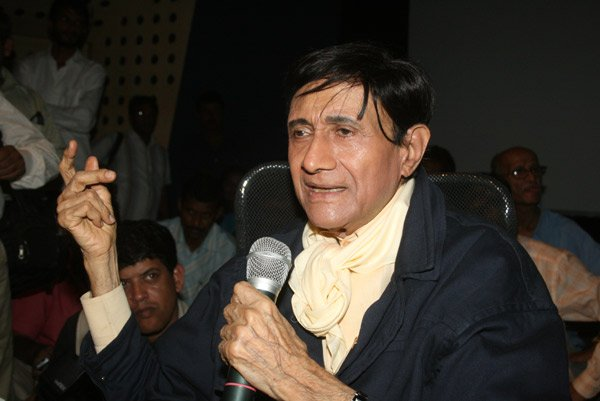
Dev Anand at a press conference in 2007

Dev Anand (born Dharamdev Pishorimal Anand; 26 September 1923 – 3 December 2011), was an Indian actor, film producer, film director and screenwriter known for his work in Hindi cinema. Anand is considered one of the greatest and most successful actors in the history of Indian cinema. Through a career that spanned over six decades, he worked in more than 100 films. Anand is a recipient of four Filmfare Awards, including two for Best Actor. The Government of India honored him with Padma Bhushan, Indian third highest civilian honour in 2001 and with Dadasaheb Phalke Award in 2002.

In 1946, Anand debuted with a lead role in Prabhat Films's Hum Ek Hain, a film about Hindu-Muslim unity. He had his first hit in Ziddi (1948) and gained widespread recognition with the superhit Baazi (1951), which is regarded as the forerunner of the spate of "Bombay Noir" films that followed in Bollywood in the 1950s. In later years, he starred in top grossing films such as Jaal (1952), Taxi Driver (1954), Insaniyat (1955), Munimji (1955), C.I.D. (1956), Pocket Maar (1956), Funtoosh (1956), Paying Guest (1957), Kala Pani (1958) and Kala Bazar (1960). Anand acquired a romantic image with films such as Manzil (1960), Jab Pyar Kisi Se Hota Hai (1961), Hum Dono (1961), Asli-Naqli (1962) and Tere Ghar Ke Samne (1963).

The 1965 film Guide marked a major milestone in Anand's career. Based on the novel by R. K. Narayan, it became a box office success; and was entered for Best Foreign Language Film at the 38th Academy Awards. He reunited with Vijay Anand for the movie Jewel Thief (1967), based on the thriller genre, it went on to become a hit at the box office. In the 70s, he forayed into direction with espionage drama Prem Pujari. Throughout the 70s and 80s, he starred in a number of highly successful films such as Johny Mera Naam (1970), which was highest grosser of the year, Hare Rama Hare Krishna (1971), Banarasi Babu (1973), Heera Panna (1973), Amir Garib (1974), Warrant (1975), Des Pardes (1978), Lootmaar (1980), Hum Naujawan (1985) and Lashkar (1989). The 2011 film Chargesheet was Anand's final film.

Anand's fast dialogue delivery and unique nodding style became the trademarks of his acting in movies. His style was often copied by other actors. Many of Dev Anand's films explored his cultural viewpoint of the world and often highlighted many socially relevant topics. Anand won the Filmfare Award for Best Actor for the films Kala Pani and Guide.

== Filmography ==
Year	Film	Role played	Producer	Director	Notes	Ref.
1946	Hum Ek Hain	Shankar				
1947	Mohan	Mohan				
1947	Aage Badho	Uday				
1948	Hum Bhi Insan Hain	Vinayak				
1948	Vidya	Chandrashekhar (Chandu) (Note: Dev Anand played a single character in the film who has two or more different names.)				
1948	Ziddi	Puran				
1949	Jeet	Vijay				
1949	Namoona	Jeevan				
1949	Shair	Deepak				
1949	Uddhār					
1950	Afsar	Kapoor	Yes			
1950	Birha Ki Raat	Shekhar				
1950	Dilruba	Rattan				
1950	Hindustan Hamara					
1950	Khel					
1950	Madhubala	Ashok				
1950	Nili	Kumar				
1950	Nirala	Dr. Anand				
1951	Aaram	Shyam				
1951	Baazi	Madan	Yes			
1951	Do Sitare	Prakash				
1951	Nadaan	Ranjan				
1951	Sanam	Yogendra				
1951	Sazaa	Ashok				
1951	Stage	Anand				
1952	Aandhiyan	Ram Mohan Kapoor				
1952	Jaal	Tony Fernandes				
1952	Rahi	Ramesh				
1952	Tamasha	Dilip				
1952	Zalzala	Atin				
1953	Armaan	Madan				
1953	Humsafar	Digvijay Karan Singh	Yes			
1953	Patita	Nirmal Chander				
1954	Baadbaan	Naren				
1954	Ferry alias Kashti	Vikas				
1954	Taxi Driver	Mangal				
1955	Faraar alias Dev Anand In Goa	Gora				
1955	House No. 44	Ashok	Yes			
1955	Insaniyat	Bhanu Pratap				
1955	Milap	Rajendra Sayal				
1955	Munimji	Amar alias Raj				
1956	C.I.D.	Shekhar				
1956	Funtoosh	Ram Lal (Funtoosh)	Yes			
1956	Pocket Maar	Roshan				
1957	Baarish	Ramu				
1957	Dushman	Ram Singh				
1957	Nau Do Gyarah	Madan Gopal				
1957	Paying Guest	Ramesh				
1958	Amardeep	Ashok				
1958	Kala Pani	Karan Mehra	Yes			
1958	Solva Saal	Pran Nath Kashyap				
1959	Love Marriage	Sunil Kumar (Sonu)				
1960	Bombai Ka Babu	Babu alias Kundan				
1960	Ek Ke Baad Ek	Prakash				
1960	Kala Bazar	Raghuveer	Yes			
1960	Manzil	Raj Kumar Mehra				
1960	Jaali Note	Dinesh alias Kunwar Vijay Bahadur alias Abdul Rasheed				
1960	Sarhad	Amar				
1961	Hum Dono	Mahesh Anand & Manoharlal Verma (Double role) (Note: Dev Anand played dual roles in this film.)	Yes			
1961	Jab Pyar Kisi Se Hota Hai	Sunder alias Monto				
1961	Maya	Manmohan alias Shyam				
1961	Roop Ki Rani Choron Ka Raja	Chhagan				
1962	Asli-Naqli	Anand				
1962	Baat Ek Raat Ki	Rajesh				
1963	Kinare Kinare	Kamal				
1963	Tere Ghar Ke Samne	Rakesh Kumar Anand	Yes			
1964	Sharabi	Keshav				
1965	Guide	Raju	Yes			
1965	Teen Devian	Dev Dutt				
1965	The Guide	Raju			English film	
1966	Pyar Mohabbat	Naresh Singh				
1967	Jewel Thief	Vinay alias Amar	Yes			
1968	Duniya	Amar Nath Sharma				
1968	Kahin Aur Chal	Shail				
1970	Johny Mera Naam	Sohan alias Johny				
1970	Mahal	Rajesh Dixit				
1970	Prem Pujari	Ram Dev Bakshi	Yes	Yes		
1970	The Evil Within	Dev Verma			English film	
1971	Gambler	Raja				
1971	Tere Mere Sapne	Dr. Anand Kumar	Yes			
1972	Haré Rama Haré Krishna	Prashant Jaiswal	Yes	Yes		
1972	Yeh Gulistan Hamara	Vijay				
1973	Banarasi Babu	Sohan Lal & Mohan (double role)				
1973	Chhupa Rustam	Ashwini Kumar alias Natwarlal alias Chhupa Rustam				
1973	Heera Panna	Heera Bhandari	Yes	Yes		
1973	Joshila	Amar				
1973	Shareef Budmaash	Ramesh alias Rocky	Yes			
1974	Amir Garib	Manmohan (Moni) alias Bagula Bhagat				
1974	Ishk Ishk Ishk	Dhun alias Ravi Vyas	Yes	Yes		
1974	Prem Shastra	Sagar Sharma				
1975	Warrant	Arun Mehra				
1976	Bullet	Dharam Dev				
1976	Jaaneman	Ronny	Yes			
1977	Darling Darling	Kumar				
1977	Kalabaaz	Vijay				
1977	Sahib Bahadur	Prem Pratap				
1978	Des Pardes	Veer Sahni	Yes	Yes		
1980	Lootmaar	Bhagat	Yes	Yes		
1980	Man Pasand	Pratap				
1982	Swami Dada	Hari Mohan alias Swami Dada	Yes	Yes		
1984	Anand Aur Anand	Arun Anand	Yes	Yes		
1985	Hum Naujawan	Hans	Yes	Yes		
1989	Lashkar	Anand				
1989	Sachché Ká Bol-Bálá	Karan Kaul	Yes	Yes		
1990	Awwal Number	Vikram Singh (Vicky)	Yes	Yes		
1991	Sau Crore	Kumar	Yes	Yes		
1993	Pyaar Ka Tarana	No	Yes	Yes		
1995	Gangster	Father Pereira	Yes	Yes		
1996	Return of Jewel Thief	Vinay alias Amar				
1998	Main Solah Baras Ki	Himself	Yes	Yes	Guest appearance	
2001	Censor	Vikramjeet (Vicky)	Yes	Yes		
2003	Love at Times Square	Shaan Khanna	Yes	Yes		
2005	Mr. Prime Minister	Prem Batra alias Johnny Master	Yes	Yes		
2011	Chargesheet	Gambheer Singh	Yes	Yes		
2016	Aman Ke Farishtey	Paramveer			Delayed release	

== Bibliography ==
- Rajadhyaksha, Ashish; Willemen, Paul (1998) [1994]. Encyclopaedia of Indian Cinema (PDF). New Delhi: Oxford University Press. ISBN 0-19-563579-5.
