= List of awards and nominations received by Dev Anand =

Dev Anand awards and nominations
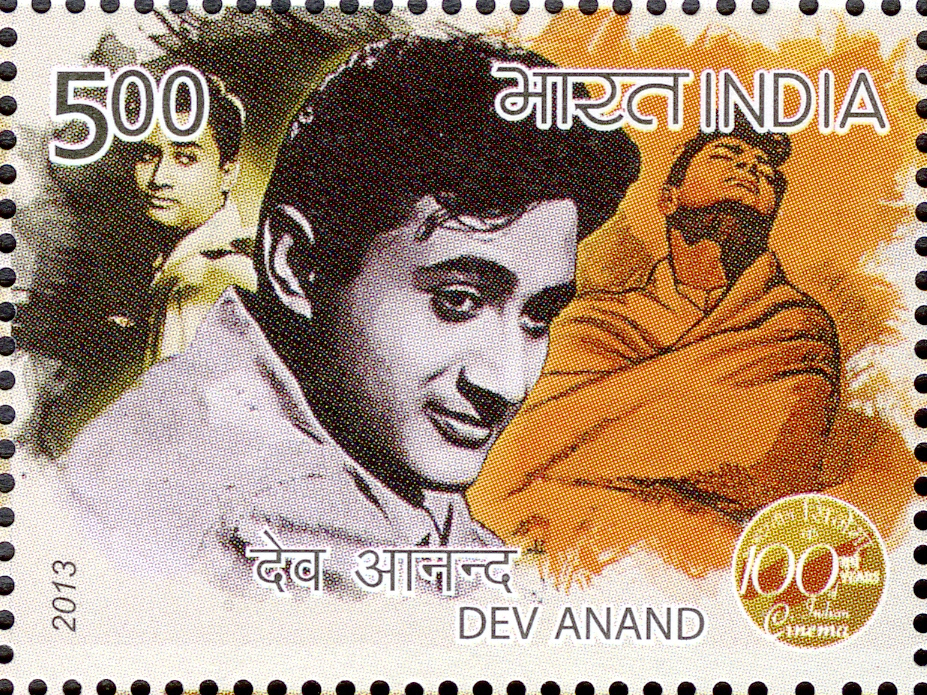
- Anand on 2013 stamp of India
Awards and nominations
Award	Wins	Nominations
Filmfare Awards	3	7
National Film Awards	2	2
Other awards	5	5
Other Recognitions	23	23

Totals (Note: Certain award groups do not simply award one winner. They acknowledge several different recipients, have runners-up, and have third place. Since this is a specific recognition and is different from losing an award, runner-up mentions are considered wins in this award tally. For simplification and to avoid errors, each award in this list has been presumed to have had a prior nomination.)
- Wins: 35
- Nominations: 38

Dev Anand (born Dharamdev Pishorimal Anand; 26 September 1923 – 3 December 2011) was an Indian actor, writer, director and producer known for his work in Hindi cinema. Anand is considered as one of the greatest and most successful actors in the history of Indian cinema. Through a career that spanned over six decades, he worked in more than 100 films. Anand is a recipient of four Filmfare Awards, including two for Best Actor. The Government of India honoured him with Padma Bhushan, Indian third highest civilian honour in 2001 and with Dadasaheb Phalke Award in 2002. In 1946, Anand debuted with a lead role in Prabhat Films' Hum Ek Hain, a film about Hindu-Muslim unity. In later years, he starred in top-grossing films such as Jaal (1952), Taxi Driver (1954), Insaniyat (1955), Munimji (1955), C.I.D. (1956), Paying Guest (1957), Kala Pani (1958) and Kala Bazar (1960). Anand acquired a romantic image with films such as Manzil (1960), Jab Pyar Kisi Se Hota Hai (1961), Hum Dono (1961), Asli-Naqli (1962) and Tere Ghar Ke Samne (1963).

== Civilian Award ==
Year	Award	Work	Result	Ref.
2001	Padma Bhushan	Contribution in the field of Arts	Honoured	

== Filmfare Awards ==
Year	Award	Category	Work	Result	Ref.
1956	3rd Filmfare Awards	Best Actor	Munimji	Nominated	
1959	6th Filmfare Awards	Best Actor	Kala Pani	Won	
1960	7th Filmfare Awards	Best Actor	Love Marriage	Nominated	
1961	8th Filmfare Awards	Best Actor	Kala Bazar	Nominated	
1962	9th Filmfare Awards	Best Actor	Hum Dono	Nominated	
1967	14th Filmfare Awards	Best Actor	Guide	Won	
1967	14th Filmfare Awards	Best Film	Guide	Won	
1993	38th Filmfare Awards	Lifetime Achievement Award	—N/a	Honoured	

== National Film Awards ==
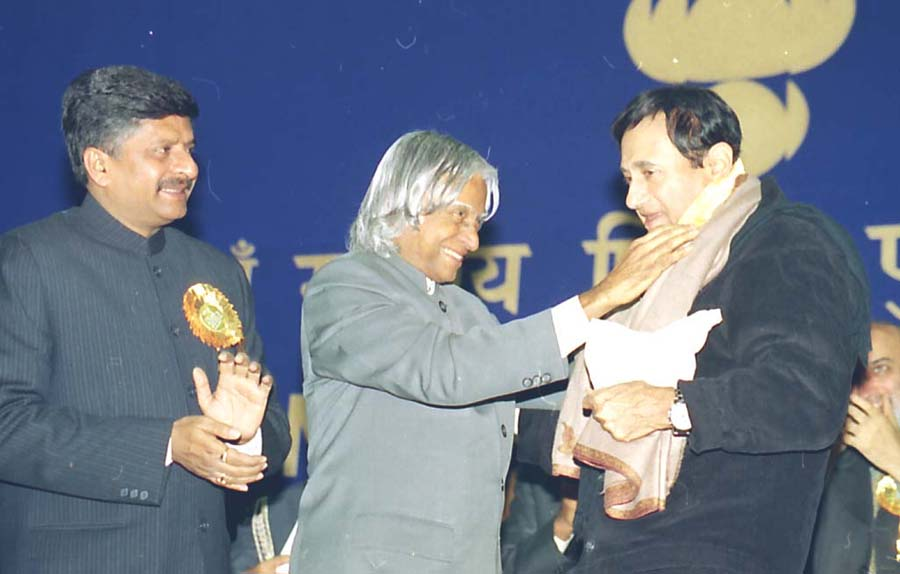
Anand being awarded Dadasaheb Phalke Award by President of India A. P. J. Abdul Kalam

Year	Award	Category	Work	Result	Ref.
1965	13th National Film Awards	Third Best Feature Film in Hindi	Guide	Won	
2002	Dadasaheb Phalke Award	Outstanding contribution to Indian cinema	—N/a	Honoured	

== Other awards ==
Year	Award	Category	Result	Ref.
1995	Screen Awards	Lifetime Achievement Award	Honoured	
2003	4th IIFA Awards	Lifetime Achievement Award	Honoured	
2006	ANR National Award	Lifetime Achievement Award	Honoured	
2009	Stardust Awards	Lifetime Achievement Award	Honoured	
2011	NDTV Indian of the Year	Lifetime Achievement Award	Honoured	

== Honours and recognitions ==
- 1997 – Mumbai Academy of the Moving Image Award for his Outstanding Services to the Indian Film Industry.
- 1998 – Lifetime Achievement Award by the Anandalok Puraskar Committee in Calcutta.
- 1999 – Sansui Viewers' Choice Movie Awards Lifetime Achievement Award for his "Immense Contribution to Indian Cinema" in New Delhi.
- 2000 – Film Goers' Mega Movie Maestro of the Millennium Award in Mumbai.
- In July 2000, in New York City, he was honoured by an Award from the hands of the then First Lady of the United States of America, Hillary Clinton, for his "Outstanding Contribution to Indian Cinema".
- In 2000, he was awarded the Indo-American Association "Star of the Millennium" Award in Silicon Valley, California.
- 2001 – Evergreen Star of the Millennium Award at the Gold Awards at the Nassau Coliseum, New York.
- Donna Ferrara, Member of the New York State Assembly, honoured him with a "New York State Assembly Citation" for his "Outstanding Contribution to the Cinematic Arts Worthy of the Esteem and Gratitude of the Great State of New York" on 1 May 2001.
- 2004 – Legend of Indian Cinema Award at Atlantic City (United States).
- 2004 – Living Legend Award by the Federation of Indian Chambers of Commerce & Industry (FICCI) in recognition of his contribution to the Indian entertainment industry.
- 2005 – Sony Gold Award.
- In 2005, he was honoured with a "Special National Film Award" by the Government of Nepal at Nepal's first National Indian film festival in Stockholm.
- 2006 – ANR National Award.
- 2006 – Glory of India Award by IIAF, London.
- 2007 – Punjab Ratan (Jewel of Punjab) Award by the World Punjabi Organisation (European Division) for his outstanding contribution to the field of art and entertainment.
- 2008 – Lifetime Achievement Award by Ramya Cultural Academy in association with Vinmusiclub.
- 2008 – Lifetime Achievement Award by Rotary Club of Bombay.
- 2008 – Awarded at the IIJS Solitaire Awards.
- In 2008, he was guest of honour at a dinner hosted by the Provost of Highland Council in Inverness, Scotland to celebrate 10 years since he first worked in the Scottish Highlands. He spent several days in the area, en route to Cannes, as a guest of the Highlands and Islands Film Commission.
- 2009 – Legend Award given to Dev Anand by Rajinikanth.
- 2010 – Rashtriya Gaurav Award.
- 2011 – Rashtriya Kishore Kumar Samman from the Government of Madhya Pradesh.
- 2013 – Lifetime Achievement Maestro Award by the Whistling Woods International Institute.

== See also ==
- Dev Anand filmography
- Navketan Films
- Kalpana Kartik
