= Samrat (1954 film) =

- Directed by: Najam Naqvi
- Starring: Ajit; Rehana; Sapru; Randir
- Music by: Hemant Kumar
- Production company: Filmistan
- Release date: 22 January 1954 (India)
- Country: India
- Language: Hindi

Samrat is a 1954 Bollywood film directed by Najam Naqvi. The film featured Ajit, Rehana, Kamalesh Kumari and others.

== Plot ==
The Diwan of a kingdom, Guman Singh, has connections with the leader of a pirate gang. Sagar and two of his friends Kanhaiya and Kanu learns of this connection from a wounded sailor. Bijli, a pub dancer, discovers this. Sagar informs the King but due to the power exerted by the Diwan who is engaged to the King's daughter, Rajakumari, he is jailed for giving false information. Rajakumari suspects Guman and visits the pirates' island in disguise. She learns the truth and tells her father about it. When the King called for Guman, he sensed the trouble and stages a coup. He imprisons the King and replaces him with a lookalike. Rajakumari is forced to dance in the pirates' ship. Sagar, who was earlier released, attacks the ship and frees Rajakumari. He then kills Guman in a sword fight and releases the real King from prison.

== Cast ==
- Ajit
- Rehana
- Kamlesh Kumari
- Mumtaz Ali
- Ram Singh
- Sapru
- S. L. Puri
- Randhir
- Bhujbal Singh

== Production ==
The film was dubbed into Tamil under the title Kaadhal Parisu and was released in 1955. Ku. Ma. Balasubramaniam wrote the dialogues and lyrics. (Note: Not to be confused with Kadhal Parisu that featured Kamal Haasan and released in 1987.)

== Soundtrack ==
Music was composed by Hemant Kumar and the lyrics were penned by Rajendra Krishan. Playback singers are Lata Mangeshkar, Geeta Dutt, Asha Bhosle, Mohammed Rafi and C. Ramchandra. The Tamil dubbed version marked his debut in that language.

Hindi songs

No.	Song	Singer/s	Duration (m:ss)
1	"Do Ghadi Saath Tere Dil Mera Aabad Raha"	Geeta Dutt	03:27
2	"Gora Bhi Achchha Kaala Bhi Achchha"	Geeta Dutt	03:17
3	"Duniya Se Kya Karen Vafa"	Lata Mangeshkar	03:25
4	"Meri Dam Bhar Paapin Aankh Lagi"	Lata Mangeshkar	02:48
5	"Yeh Khamoshiyaan Yeh Samaan"	Lata Mangeshkar	04:10
6	"Jaan Dena Aashiquon Ka Kaam"	Mohammed Rafi & C. Ramchandra	06:26
7	"Sabko Mubaarak Naya Saal"	Asha Bhosle	03:17
8	"Shabaab Hi Shabaab Hai"	Asha Bhosle	03:13
9	"Yeh Khamoshiyaan Yeh Samaan"	Asha Bhosle	03:08

Tamil songs

No.	Song	Singer/s	Lyricist	Duration (m:ss)
1	"Nilavaanile Jaalamaai"	Lakshmi Shankar	Ku. Ma. Balasubramaniam	
2	"Nilaavaanile Megamaai" (pathos)	Lakshmi Shankar	Ku. Ma. Balasubramaniam	
3	"Inba Kannaalan Unnai Naan"	Lakshmi Shankar	Ku. Ma. Balasubramaniam	
4	"Pudhumai Nal Aandinile"	Lakshmi Shankar	Ku. Ma. Balasubramaniam	
5	"Ullaasamaai Ellorume"	Lakshmi Shankar	Ku. Ma. Balasubramaniam	
6	"Anbe Ulagil Virodhamaai"	Lakshmi Shankar	Ku. Ma. Balasubramaniam	
