= Meena Kapoor =

Indian playback singer

Meena Kapoor (1930 in Kolkata (then Calcutta) – 23 November 2017) was an Indian playback singer. She was the daughter of actor Bikram Kapoor who worked with the New Theatres studio. Her family was also related to famed filmmaker PC Barua. Meena's singing was noticed at a young age by composers like Ninu Mazumdar and SD Burman. She was a playback singer in Hindi cinema, during the 1940s and 1950s, singing hits such as "Rasiya Re Man Basiya Re" from Pardesi (1957), Ek Dharti Hai Ek Gagan from Adhikar (1954) and 'Kachhi hai Umariya' picturised on Meena Kumari in Char Dil Char Rahen (1959). She was a friend of the singer Geeta Dutt; the two had similar vocal styles.

She married music composer Anil Biswas on 19 March 1957, who later left Hindi cinema and shifted to Delhi as he became director of the National Orchestra at the All India Radio (AIR) in March 1963. Anil Biswas died in Delhi in May 2003. The couple did not have any children. But Anil Biswas had 4 children with his first wife, Ashalata Biswas (née Mehrunnisa).

One of Kapoor's most famous songs is "Aana meri jaan sunday ke sunday", a duet with C. Ramchandra and Shamshad Begum from the movie Shehnai (1947) and "Kuch Aur Zamana Kehta Hain", set to tune by Anil Biswas from the film Choti Choti Baatein (1965).

The veteran singer died on 23 November 2017 in Kolkata at 2:20 in the morning. She was suffering from paralysis for a few years before her death.

== Filmography ==
- Aagosh
- Dukhiyari
- Haridarshan
- Gopinath
- Akash
- Naina
- Usha Kiran
- Door Chalen
- Choti Choti Baatein
- Chalte Chalte
- Pardesi (1957)
- Naa Illu (1953)
- Ghayal (1951)
- Aadhi Raat (1950)
- Anokha Pyar (1948)
- Ghar Ki Izzat (1948)
- Nai Reet (1948)
- Shehnai (1947)

Death: She died in the early hours on Thursday, 23 November 2017 in Kolkata home.
