= P. L. Santoshi =

Indian film director

Pyare Lal Santoshi
- Born: Pyare Lal Srivastav; 7 August 1916; Jabalpur, Central Provinces and Berar, British India
- Died: 7 September 1978 (aged 62); Bombay, Maharashtra, India
- Occupations: Director; film producer; lyricist; screenwriter
- Organisation: Santoshi Productions
- Children: Rajkumar Santoshi (son)

Pyare Lal Srivastav (7 August 1916 – 7 September 1978), better known as Pyare Lal Santoshi or P. L. Santoshi, was an Indian film director, producer, lyricist and screenwriter. Santoshi rose to prominence as a director with Hum Ek Hain (1946) and Shehnai (1947). During the 1950s, he directed popular musical comedies such as Sargam (1950), Chham Chhama Chham (1952) and Sabse Bada Rupaiya (1955). Film historian Sanjit Narwekar credits him alongside Roop K. Shorey and Satyen Bose for their "lasting contribution to the comic genre" during the post-Independence era.

Santoshi also ventured into film production with Shin Shinaki Boobla Boo (1952), which failed commercially and was banned by the Government of India for its alleged "low moral tone". While his own productions were unsuccessful, Santoshi had a major box office success as a director and screenwriter in the Muslim social film Barsat Ki Rat (1960). Later in his career, he also directed a few Bhojpuri-language films.

His son is the National Film Award-winning director, Rajkumar Santoshi.

== Early life ==
Santoshi was born on 7 August 1916, as Pyare Lal Srivastav. He was a native of Jabalpur, Madhya Pradesh. He adopted the pen name Santoshi on entering the film industry.

== Career ==
Santoshi arrived in Bombay in mid-1930s. He served as a lyricist on several Bombay Talkies productions, including Basant (1942) and Kismet (1943).

Santoshi then debuted as a director with Prabhat Film Company's social-themed Hum Ek Hain (1946), which also marked the debut of actor Dev Anand. Among contemporary critics, Santoshi was praised by Baburao Patel for his "honest" and "praiseworthy" efforts, and that "Santoshi can easily make a good director, at least far sight better than several stupid fools we have now in the country." Film critic Deepa Gahlot has included Hum Ek Hain in her book Take-2: 50 Films That Deserve A New Audience (2015).

Santoshi later joined Filmistan Studio. Besides Subodh Mukherjee and Nasir Hussain, he emerged as one of the directors who often created "mid-budget genre productions [which sold] mainly on their star value and their music", according to BFI's The Encyclopedia of Indian Cinema (1998).

Among his works at Filmistan was the marital drama Shehnai (1947)—released on the day India got its independence. The film became a commercial success, particularly popular for its music composed by C. Ramachandra.

In the 1950s, Santoshi began directing musical comedies such as Sargam (1950) and Chham Chhama Chham (1952). In 1952, Santoshi ventured into film production with the musical Shin Shinaki Boobla Boo, which he also directed. The film attracted controversy for its plot: the protagonist Shin Shinaki (Rehana) seduces the son of her father's killer to exact revenge. Although the film was passed by the Censor Board of India, it ended up banned by the Government of India for its "low moral tone" and perceived glorification of crime. The ban was eventually revoked but the film was not a box office success.

One of the biggest successes of Santoshi as a director and screenwriter came in the 1960 Muslim social film Barsat Ki Rat. Starring Madhubala and featuring a soundtrack composed by Roshan, the film became one of the highest-grossing Indian productions of the 1960s. It has been noted for its portrayal of Indian religious diversity and its depiction of headstrong female characters. Inspired by the success of Barsaat Ki Raat, Santoshi directed another film on similar themes, named Qawwali Ki Raat (1963).

During the mid-1960s, Santoshi pivoted to Bhojpuri cinema, directing films such as Kab Hoihain Gavanava Hamaar (1964) and Saiyan Se Bhaile Milanwa (1965).

== Personal life and death ==
Santoshi was married twice. From his second marriage to a Tamil woman, he had a son, Rajkumar (born 1956), and two daughters. Rajkumar later became a film director in the 1990s and is a recipient of multiple National Film Awards.

According to Rajkumar, his father's career declined after his film production ventures failed, and the family experienced financial hardship throughout the 1960s and 1970s. Santoshi died of a kidney failure in Bombay in 1978.

== Selected filmography ==
=== As a lyricist ===
- Anjaan (1940)
- Sajani (1940)
- Jhoola (1941)
- Basant (1942)
- Kismet (1943)
- Teen Batti Char Raasta (1953)
- Post Box 999 (1958)
- Raj Tilak (1958)

=== As a director ===
- Hum Ek Hain (1946)
- Milan (1946)
- Shehnai (1947)
- Khidki (1948)
- Roop Rupaiya (1949)
- Sargam (1950)
- Apni Chhaya (1950)
- Chham Chhama Chham (1952)
- Shin Shinaki Boobla Boo (1952)
- Chalis Baba Ek Chor (1954)
- Sabse Bada Rupaiya (1955)
- Ha Ha Hee Hee Hoo Hoo (1955)
- Hum Panchhi Ek Daal Ke (1957)
- Garma Garam (1957)
- Pehli Raat (1959)
- Barsat Ki Rat (1960)
- Nai Maa (1960)
- Opera House (1961)
- Pyar Ki Dastaan (1961)
- Qawwali Ki Raat (1963)
- Dil Hi To Hai (1963)
- Holiday in Bombay (1963)
- Kab Hoihain Gavanava Hamaar (1964; in Bhojpuri)
- Saiyan Se Bhaile Milanwa (1965; in Bhojpuri)

=== As a writer ===
- Vidya (1948)
- Nirala (1950)
- Raj Tilak (1958)
- Barsat Ki Rat (1960)

== Bibliography ==
- Narwekar, Sanjit (2005). Eena Meena Deeka: The Story of Hindi Film Comedy. Rupa & Company. ISBN 9788129108593.
- Rajadhyaksha, Ashish; Willemen, Paul (1998). The Encyclopedia of Indian Cinema. British Film Institute. ISBN 9781135943257.
