= List of Tamil films of 1955 =

Prior to the amendment of Tamil Nadu Entertainments Tax Act 1939 on 1 April 1958, Gross was 133.33 per cent of Nett for all films. Commercial Taxes Department disclosed ₹0.98 crore in entertainment tax revenue for the year.

The following is a list of films produced in the Tamil film industry in India in 1955, in alphabetical order.

== 1955 ==
Title	Director	Production	Music	Cast	Release date (D-M-Y)
Asai Anna Arumai Thambi	G. R. Rao	Sreemathi Pictures	K. V. Mahadevan	Madhuri Devi, A. P. Nagarajan, T. R. Ramachandran, Rajasulochana, V. M. Ezhumalai, A. Karunanidhi, Sushila, M. S. S. Bhagyam	29-07-1955
Chella Pillai	M. V. Raman	AVM Productions	R. Sudharsanam	K. R. Ramasamy, Savitri, P. Kannamba, Pandari Bai, T. S. Balaiah, K. A. Thangavelu, B. R. Panthulu, Javar Seetharaman	24-06-1955
Doctor Savithri	R. M. Krishnaswamy	Aruna Films	G. Ramanathan	Anjali Devi, S. Balachander, B. R. Panthulu, M. N. Rajam, M. N. Nambiar, N. S. Krishnan, T. A. Madhuram	25-11-1955
Ellam Inba Mayam	Jiten Banerji	P. N. D. Production	Ghantasala	T. R. Ramachandran, Ragini, Rajasulochana, K. A. Thangavelu, Friend Ramasamy, Lakshmiprabha	01-04-1955
Ezhayin Aasthi	D. L. Ramachandar	Rohini Pictures	T. A. Kalyanam; G. Natarajan	Sowcar Janaki, Gummadi, Jaggayya, Suryakantham	14-04-1955
Gomathiyin Kaadhalan	P. Neelakantan	T. R. R. Productions	G. Ramanathan	T. R. Ramachandran, Savitri, K. A. Thangavelu, K. Sarangapani, Friend Ramasamy, T. P. Muthulakshmi	16-09-1955
Gruhalakshmi	H. V. Babu	Rohini Pictures	B. S. Kala/Sarala; G. Nataraj; T. A. Kalyanam	M. K. Radha, V. Nagayya, Anjali Devi, T. V. Kumudhini	14-04-1955
Gulebakavali	T. R. Ramanna	R. R. Pictures	Viswanathan–Ramamoorthy	M. G. Ramachandran, T. R. Rajakumari, G. Varalakshmi, Rajasulochana, K. A. Thangavelu, J. P. Chandrababu, E. V. Saroja	29-07-1955
Guna Sundari	K. Kameswara Rao	Vijaya Productions	Ghantasala	Gemini Ganesan, Savitri, S. V. Ranga Rao, M. N. Nambiar, A. Karunanidhi, V. M. Ezhumalai, Lakshmiprabha, T. P. Muthulakshmi	16-12-1955
Kalvanin Kadhali	V. S. Raghavan	Revathi Productions	G. Govindarajulu Naidu; Ghantasala	Sivaji Ganesan, P. Bhanumathi, T. R. Ramachandran, Kusalakumari, K. Sarangapani, S. R. Janaki	13-11-1955
Kalyanam Seydhukko	R. Chandar	Sri Unity Pictures	Ramaneekaran	P. S. Govindan, Girija, Venkataraman, M. S. S. Bhagyam, A. Karunanidhi, K. S. Angamuthu	30-09-1955
Kanavane Kankanda Deivam	T. R. Raghunath	Narayanan & Co	A. Rama Rao; Hemant Kumar	Gemini Ganesan, Anjali Devi, Lalitha, V. Nagayya, Friend Ramasamy, T. P. Muthulakshmi	06-05-1955
Kathanayaki	K. Ramnoth	Modern Theatres	G. Ramanathan	Padmini, T. R. Ramachandran, M. N. Rajam, K. A. Thangavelu, A. Karunanidhi, K. Malathi, K. S. Angamuthu	19-02-1955
Kaveri	D. Yoganand	Krishna Pictures	G. Ramanathan; Viswanathan–Ramamoorthy	Sivaji Ganesan, Padmini, Lalitha, N. S. Krishnan, T. A. Madhuram	12-01-1955
Koteeswaran	Sundar Rao Nadkarni	Sri Ganesh Movietone	S. V. Venkatraman	Sivaji Ganesan, Padmini, S. Balachander, Sriram, Ragini, K. A. Thangavelu, Serukalathur Sama, Rushyendramani	13-11-1955
Maheswari	T. R. Raghunath	Modern Theaters	G. Ramanathan	Gemini Ganesan, Savitri, M. N. Rajam, K. A. Thangavelu, C. K. Saraswathi, A. Karunanidhi	13-11-1955
Maaman Magal	R. S. Mani	Mani Productions	S. V. Venkatraman	Gemini Ganesan, Savitri, J. P. Chandrababu, D. Balasubramaniam, T. S. Durairaj	14-10-1955
Mangaiyar Thilakam	L. V. Prasad	Vaidhya Films	S. Dakshinamurthi	Sivaji Ganesan, Padmini, S. V. Subbaiah, M. N. Rajam, K. A. Thangavelu, Ragini, K. Sarangapani, K. N. Kamalam	26-08-1955
Menaka	V. C. Suburamman	Kasturi Films	T. G. Lingappa; C. N. Pandurangan; Vedha	K. R. Ramasamy, Lalitha, Ragini, K. Sarangapani, Friend Ramasamy	1-5-1955
Methavigal	K. Vembu	Revathi Productions	G. Govindarajulu Naidu	T. R. Ramachandran, M. N. Rajam, K. A. Thangavelu, P. K. Saraswathi	27-05-1955
Missiamma	L. V. Prasad	Vijaya Prouductions	S. Rajeswara Rao	Gemini Ganesan, Savitri, K. A. Thangavelu, K. Sarangapani, Jamuna, S. V. Ranga Rao, Rushyendramani	14-01-1955
Mullaivanam	V. Krishnan	Aravind Pictures	K. V. Mahadevan	Sriram, Kumari Rukmani, A. Karunanidhi, P. S. Gnanam	11-03-1955
Mudhal Thethi	P. Neelakantan	Padmini Pictures	T. G. Lingappa	Sivaji Ganesan, Anjali Devi, N. S. Krishnan, T. A. Madhuram	12-03-1955
Nalla Thangai	S. A. Natarajan	Forward Art Films	G. Ramanathan	M. N. Nambiar, Madhuri Devi, Rajasulochana, S. A. Natarajan, A. Karunanidhi	05-02-1955
Nalla Thangal	P. V. Krishna Iyer	Madras Movietone	G. Ramanathan	R. S. Manohar, G. Varalakshmi, A. P. Nagarajan, Madhuri Devi, J. P. Chandrababu, E. V. Saroja	30-12-1955
Nallavan	M. Thiruvengadam	Sunrise Productions	M. S. Gnanamani	R. S. Manohar, Serukulathur Sama, P. K. Saraswathi, Rajasulochana, M. N. Nambiar	05-03-1955
Nam Kuzhandai	K. S. Gopalakrishnan	Windsor Productions	M. D. Parthasarathy	R. S. Manohar, S. Varalakshmi, V. Nagayya, A. P. Nagarajan, N. S. Krishnan, T. A. Madhuram, Kumari Lakshmi, Lakshmiprabha	27-05-1955
Needhipathi	A. S. A. Sami	Vijaya Films	Viswanathan–Ramamoorthy	K. R. Ramasamy, Gemini Ganesan, Rajasulochana, K. Malathi, Kusalakumari, S. V. Sahasranamam, M. N. Rajam	07-10-1955
Pennarasi	K. Somu	M. A. V. Pictures	K. V. Mahadevan	A. P. Nagarajan, P. Kannamba, K. Suryakala, Rajasulochana, V. M. Ezhumalai, A. Karunanidhi, C. T. Rajakantham	14-04-1955
Porter Kandan	K. Vembu	Narasu Studios	Viswanathan–Ramamoorthy	M. K. Radha, G. Varalakshmi, Valaiyapathi G. Muthukrishnan, D. Balasubramaniam, M. N. Nambiar, T. S. Durairaj, T. P. Muthulakshmi	14-04-1955
Town Bus	K. Somu	M. A. V. Pictures	K. V. Mahadevan	N. N. Kannappa, Anjali Devi, M. N. Rajam, A. Karunanidhi, T. P. Muthulakshmi, V. K. Ramasamy, Tambaram Lalitha	13-11-1955
Ulagam Palavitham	S. A. Murugesh	National Pictures	N. S. Balakrishnan	Sivaji Ganesan, Lalitha, M. Lakshmi Prabha, K. A. Thangavelu, M. N. Rajam, V. K. Ramasamy	14-04-1955
Valliyin Selvan	Kothamangalam Subbu	United Film Arts	P. S. Anantharaman	Gemini Ganesan, S. V. Subbaiah, S. V. Sahasranamam, Lalitha, M. S. Sundari Bai, Vanaja	11-02-1955

== Dubbed films ==
Title	Director(s)	Company	Composer	Original film		Cast	Ref.
Title	Director(s)	Company	Composer	Title	Language	Cast	Ref.
Anarkali	Vedantam Raghavayya	Anjali Pictures	P. Adinarayana Rao	Anarkali	Telugu	A. Nageswara Rao, Anjali Devi, S. V. Ranga Rao, V. Nagayya, P. Kannamba, Surabhi Balasaraswati, Peketi Sivaram	
Nalla Penmani	B. Vittalacharya	Vithal Productions	M. Ranga Rao	Kanyadhanam	Telugu	Kanta Rao, Sowcar Janaki	
Jaya Gopi	B. S. Ranga	Vikram Productions	Viswanathan–Ramamoorthy	Maa Gopi	Telugu	V. Narasimha Rao, V. Nagayya, G. Varalakshmi, Jamuna	
Jayasimhan	D. Yoganand	National Art Theater	T. V. Raju	Jayasimha	Telugu	N. T. Rama Rao, Anjali Devi, Waheeda Rehman, Kanta Rao, Relangi	
Jothi	K. B. Tilak	Navayuga Productions	Pendyala Nageswara Rao	Jyothi	Telugu	G. Varalakshmi, Savithri, Ramachandra Kashyap	
Kaadhal Parisu	Najam Naqvi		Hemant Kumar	Samrat	Hindi	Ajit, Rehana, Kamlesh Kumari	
Manoratham	C. V. Raju	Jai Raj Films	M. Venkataraju	Natasekhara	Kannada	Kalyan Kumar, Vidhyavathi, Sandhya,	
Naattiya Thara	P. Pullaiah	Pratibha Productions	G. Ramanathan	Rechukka	Telugu	N. T. Rama Rao, Anjali Devi, Devika, Mukkamala	
Vipra Narayana	P. S. Ramakrishna Rao	Bharani Studios	S. Rajeswara Rao	Vipra Narayana	Telugu	A. Nageswara Rao, P. Bhanumathi, Relangi	
