= Sajan (1947 film) =

- Ashok Kumar and Rehana in Sajan from Filmindia
- Directed by: Kishore Sahu
- Written by: Kishore Sahu
- Screenplay by: Kishore Sahu
- Story by: Kishore Sahu
- Produced by: Filmistan
- Starring: Ashok Kumar; Rehana; Ramesh Gupta; Ranjit Kumari; Leela Mishra
- Cinematography: K. H. Kapadia
- Edited by: Pundalik
- Music by: C. Ramchandra
- Production company: Filmistan
- Distributed by: Filmistan
- Release date: 1947
- Country: India
- Language: Hindi

Sajan (Boyfriend) is a 1947 Hindi romantic film directed by Kishore Sahu. The film was produced by Filmistan and had music by C. Ramchandra. The story and screenplay were by Kishore Sahu. The film had Rehana in the female lead, and following the success of this film, as well as Shehnai (1947), she became an "overnight star". The cast included Ashok Kumar, Rehana, Ramesh Gupta, Anant Prabhu and Leela Mishra.

The story revolves around Prakash (Ashok Kumar), a man suffering from amnesia following a train accident. A man pretending to be Prakash surfaces at his house. The film was a big commercial success.

== Plot ==
Prakash (Ashok Kumar) is returning home after eleven years from UK, and is now on a train for his journey back home. He meets a young man, also called Prakash (Ramesh Gupta), on the train who befriends him. The train meets with an accident and Prakash loses his memory. While Prakash is wandering around trying to regain his memory, the man from the train thinking that Prakash (Kumar) is dead, pretends to be Prakash and reaches his house. There everyone believes him to be Pakash except for his wife, Kamla (Rehana), who then runs away from home. She joins a band of wandering gypsies. Kamla and Prakash meet, both unaware of each other's true identity. Forming a close bond, the two finally realise the truth when Prakash's memory returns. The fake Prakash is revealed as the villain.

== Cast ==
- Ashok Kumar as Prakash
- Rehana as Kamla
- Ranjit Kumari as Bijli
- Leela Mishra
- S. L. Puri as Gypsy Chief

== Reception ==
Filmindia called it a "highly improbable and unrealistic story", but praised it for its fast pace and "good entertainment". The story was inspired by Random Harvest (1942), however unlike it, Sajan made "no effort" to remain "plausible". Baburao Patel, the editor of Filmindia, remarked on the implausible situation of a mother, servants and others not recognising someone only after a period of eleven years. Critical of Rehana's acting, citing it as "Rehana flops", Patel praised S. L. Puri, in his role of the gypsy leader, as the only actor to show any "authenticity" in the film.

== Soundtrack ==
Ashok Kumar, who was to sing his songs in the film, was replaced by playback singer Mohammed Rafi. In his book "A Journey Down Melody Lane", Bharatan states that Ashok Kumar was unable to reach the recording studios due to the Hindu-Muslim riots (1947), and hence the composer of the film, C. Ramchandra, "daringly" chose Rafi to sing "Hum Ko Tumhara Hi Aasra", which became "an instant hit". The lyricists were Moti B. A. ,

Qamar Jalalabadi, Ram Murti chaturvedi.

=== Song list ===
Song	Singer
"O Babu Gali Mein Teri"	Mohammed Rafi
"Humko Tumhara Hi Aasra"	Mohammed Rafi
"Humko Tumhara Hi Aasra" (Duet)	Mohammed Rafi, Lalita Deulkar
"Main Hoon Jaipur Ki Banjaran, Chanchal Mera Naam"	Mohammed Rafi, Lalita Deulkar
"Hum Banjare, Sang Hamare Dhoom Macha Le Duniya, Mauj Uda Le Duniya"	Mohammed Rafi, Lalita Deulkar, Geeta Dutt
"Sambhal Sambhalke Jaiyo Ho Banjare, Dilli Door Hai"	Mohammed Rafi, Lalita Deulkar, Geeta Dutt
"Chor Aa Gaye Nagariya"	Lalita Deulkar
"Thandi Ret Mein"	Zohrabai Ambalewali
