= Santoshi (disambiguation) =

Wikimedia disambiguation page

Santoshi may refer to:

- P. L. Santoshi Indian film director
- Rajkumar Santoshi (born 1956) Indian film director
