= Nasir Khan (Indian actor) =

Indian film actor (1924–1974)

- Born: Muhammad Nasir Khan; 1924; Peshawar, North-West Frontier Province, British India (present-day Khyber Pakhtunkhwa, Pakistan)
- Died: 3 May 1974 (aged 49–50); Amritsar, Punjab, India
- Occupation: Film actor
- Years active: 1945–1961; 1972–1974
- Spouse(s): Suraiya Nazir (divorced) Begum Para (m. 1958)
- Children: 4 (including Ayub Khan)
- Relatives: Dilip Kumar (brother); Saira Banu (sister-in-law); K. Asif (brother-in-law); Rukhsana Sultana (niece)

Nasir Khan (1924 – 3 May 1974) was an Indian actor. He was the younger brother of actor Dilip Kumar and is the father of actor Ayub Khan.

== Career ==
Nasir Khan made his acting debut in the 1945 film Mazdoor. After a few films, he shifted to Lahore after Partition and starred in the first ever Pakistani film Teri Yaad in 1948. He acted in another Pakistani film, Shahida, in 1949. Both films received average reviews in Pakistan but Shahida achieved a silver jubilee status in the cities of Delhi and Lucknow but Nasir returned to India in 1951. He resumed his acting career in Bombay, acting in several films throughout the 1950s. His movie Nagina (1951) with Nutan was a big hit. The two of them formed a memorable pair who also starred together in two more films, Aagosh and Sheesham. Nasir Khan also enacted the role of Jumna alongside his real life brother Dilip Kumar, who played the role of Gunga in the 1961 dacoit drama Bollywood film Gunga Jumna. This was his last film for a decade. He returned to films in the early 1970s playing cameos in Yaadon Ki Baraat (1973) and his final film Bairaag (1976) which released after his death.

== Personal life ==
Nasir Khan was born to Ayesha Bibi (1897–27 August 1948) and Lala Ghulam Sarwar Ali Khan (1890–5 March 1950) in a Hindko-speaking Awan family of 12 children in Peshawar. While he was born in the year 1924, some sources state his birthday to be on 11 January to while others mention 1 October as the day. Nasir's paternal grandfather had come from Afghanistan. In his autobiography, Dev Anand recalled that Nasir used to say "with pride" that he's "a Pathan, and a Punjabi."

Nasir Khan was first married to Suraiya Nazir, daughter of legendary filmmaker Nazir Ahmed Khan. From this marriage, he had a daughter Naheed Khan. Later he was married to actress Begum Para in 1958 and remained married to her until his death in 1974. From this marriage, he had one daughter Lubna Khan and two sons, Nadir Khan (who died young) and actor Ayub Khan.

== Death ==
Nasir Khan died on 3 May 1974 at the age of 50. Before his death, he had returned to films after a decade, playing small role in Yaadon Ki Baaraat (1973) and his final film Bairaag (1976), which was released after his death.

== Filmography ==
| Year | Title | Character / Role | Notes |
|---|---|---|---|
| 1945 | Mazdoor | | Debut film |
| 1947 | Shehnai | Kunwar Rajesh | |
| 1948 | Teri Yaad | | First film of Pakistan, first leading actor of Pakistani Cinema |
| 1949 | Shahida | Saeed | Second film of Pakistan, second and last film he did in Pakistan |
| 1951 | Khazana | Santosh Kumar | |
| 1951 | Nakhre | | |
| 1951 | Nagina | Shreenath Chaudhury | |
| 1951 | Nazneen | Kundan | |
| 1951 | Phoolon Ke Haar | | |
| 1951 | Saudaagar | | |
| 1952 | Aasmaan | | |
| 1952 | Hangama | | |
| 1952 | Khubsurat | | |
| 1952 | Lal Kunwar | | |
| 1952 | Shisham | | |
| 1952 | Shrimatiji | Rajesh | |
| 1953 | Aagosh | Ashok | |
| 1953 | Daaera | Sharan Kumar | |
| 1954 | Angaray | Raka | Elder Superstar brother Dilip Kumar worked as an uncredited background narrator |
| 1955 | Enam | | |
| 1955 | Jawab | Amar Kumar Dayal | |
| 1955 | Lutera | | |
| 1955 | Society | | |
| 1956 | Char Minar | | |
| 1956 | Jallad | | |
| 1956 | Kar Bhala | | Opposite future & second wife Begum Para |
| 1956 | Samundari Daku | | |
| 1957 | Aadmi | Shyam | Opposite second wife Begum Para |
| 1961 | Gunga Jumna | Jumna | First time shared screen with elder Superstar brother Dilip Kumar |
| 1961 | Saaya | | Last film as the leading actor |
| 1972 | Zindagi Zindagi | Dr. Mukherjee | |
| 1973 | Yaadon Ki Baaraat | Father of Shankar, Vijay and Ratan | |
| 1976 | Bairaag | Dr. Mishra | Posthumous release; second and last time to share screen with elder Superstar brother Dilip Kumar |

== See also ==
- Khans of Bollywood
