= Sargam (1950 film) =

1950 film

- Directed by: P. L. Santoshi
- Starring: Raj Kapoor; Rehana
- Music by: C. Ramchandra
- Release date: 1950
- Country: India
- Language: Hindi

Sargam is a 1950 Bollywood family drama film directed by P. L. Santoshi. It stars Raj Kapoor, Rehana in lead roles, with Om Prakash, David, Radhakrishan in supporting roles. A moderate box office success, the film became the eighth highest-earning Indian film of 1950, earning an approximate gross of Rs. 85,00,000 and a net of Rs. 48,00,000.

== Cast ==
- Raj Kapoor as Vinod
- Rehana as Bhairavi
- Om Prakash as Seth Roopchand
- David as Pandit Shiv Shankar
- Radhakrishan as Babulal

== Music ==
The lyrics were written by P. L. Santoshi, the director himself and the music was composed by C. Ramchandra.

Song	Singer
"Chhed Sakhi Sargam"	Lata Mangeshkar
"Koi Kisi Ka Deewana"	Lata Mangeshkar
"Do Din Ki Zindagani"	Lata Mangeshkar
"Baap Bhala Na Bhaiya, Sabse Bhala Rupaiya, Sabse Bhala Rupaiya"	Lata Mangeshkar, Mohammed Rafi, C. Ramchandra
"Main Hoon Alladin, Mere Paas Chirag-E-Cheen, Alladin Alladin Alladin"	Lata Mangeshkar, Mohammed Rafi, C. Ramchandra
"Kaisi Yeh Jodi Milayi, Mere Ram"	Lata Mangeshkar, C. Ramchandra
"Woh Humse Chup Hai, Hum Unse Chup Hai"	Lata Mangeshkar, C. Ramchandra
"Yaar Wai Wai, Yaar Wai Wai, Yaar Wai Wai Yaar"	Lata Mangeshkar, C. Ramchandra
"Mombasa Mombasa Mombasa Mombasa"	Lata Mangeshkar, C. Ramchandra
"Khalasi Bheem Palasi"	C. Ramchandra
