= Rukhsana Sultana =

Indian socialite

- Born: Meenu Bimbet; Jullundur, Punjab, British India (present-day Jalandhar, Punjab, India)
- Occupation: Political activist
- Years active: 1970–1976
- Spouse: Shivinder Singh Virk (divorced)
- Children: Amrita Singh
- Relatives: Sara Ali Khan (granddaughter); Begum Para (aunt); Nasir Khan (uncle); Ayub Khan (cousin)

Rukhsana Sultana (born Meenu Bimbet) was an Indian socialite known for being one of Sanjay Gandhi's close associates during the state of Emergency in India between 1975 and 1977. During this period she became known for leading Sanjay Gandhi's sterilisation campaign in Muslim areas of Old Delhi.

== Personal life ==
Rukhsana was born as Meenu Bimbet to Zarina Sultana (sister of film actress, Begum Para) and Mohan Bimbet. She was connected through birth and marriage to a number of well-known personalities in Indian films and media. Her aunt Begum Para was married to Nasir Khan, younger brother of Dilip Kumar. Rukhsana married Shivinder Singh Virk, an officer in the Indian Army and the nephew of Khushwant Singh. They later divorced. They had one daughter, Amrita Singh who was a leading Bollywood actress in the 1980s. Rukhsana is the grandmother of Sara Ali Khan and Ibrahim Ali Khan (b.2001) from Amrita's marriage to Saif Ali Khan
