= Mehndi (1947 film) =

- Directed by: Sibtain Fazli
- Starring: Nargis; Begum Para
- Release date: 1947
- Country: India
- Language: Hindi

Mehndi is a 1947 Indian Hindi-language film directed by Sibtain Fazli. The film starred Nargis and Begum Para.

Critic Baburao Patel reviewed the film in March 1948, under the title "Mehndi Gives A Bad Headache!"
