= Khazana (1951 film) =

1951 film by M. Sadiq

- Directed by: M. Sadiq
- Screenplay by: M. Sadiq
- Story by: O. P. Dutta
- Produced by: Bakshi Jung Bahadur
- Starring: Madhubala; Nasir Khan
- Cinematography: Ratanlal Nagar
- Edited by: Moosa Mansoor
- Music by: C. Ramachandra
- Release date: 1951
- Running time: 118 min.
- Country: India
- Language: Hindi

Khazana (transl. "Treasure") is a 1951 Indian Hindi-language adventure film directed by M. Sadiq and starring Madhubala and Nasir Khan. The music of the film was composed by C. Ramchandra.

Based on novel King Solomon's Mines (1885), Khazana is considered to be one of the most important Indian films made about invention and adventures.

== Plot ==
Seth Gopinath (Raj Mehra), a wealthy man, possesses a map pointing to a hidden treasure. He sets out to find it with his daughter Asha (Madhubala), Professor Santosh Kumar (Nasir Khan), and the professor's mute servant Mangoo (Om Prakash). Their journey through the jungle features musical interludes and various adventures, but upon reaching the location indicated by the map, the group is captured by a tribe of natives. As they face being sacrificed in a tribal ritual, Mangoo cleverly intervenes and manages to rescue everyone, bringing the adventure to a happy conclusion.

== Cast ==
- Madhubala as Asha
- Nasir Khan as Santosh Kumar
- Om Prakash as Mangoo
- Gope
- Cuckoo
- Raj Mehra as Seth Gopinath
- Ramesh Thakur
- Helen

== Production ==
Initially, Nargis was slated to play the lead role but she left the production due to her illness; she was replaced by Madhubala.

== Soundtrack ==
The music director of Khazana was C. Ramchandra and lyrics were written by Rajinder Krishan. All songs were sung by Lata Mangeshkar, along with Mohammed Rafi and C. Ramchandra.

Song	Singer
"Ae Chand Pyar Mera"	Lata Mangeshkar
"Soyi Soyi Chandni Hai"	Lata Mangeshkar
"Mohabbat Pe Itni Jawani"	Lata Mangeshkar
"Dheere Dheere Dheere"	Lata Mangeshkar
"Kar De Zara Ishaara"	Lata Mangeshkar
"Mujhe Tumse Bahut Hai Pyar, Nahin Ji Zara Zara"	Lata Mangeshkar, Mohammed Rafi
"Do Deewanon Ka Afsana, Ae Chand Kisise Na Kehna"	Lata Mangeshkar, C. Ramchandra
"Jal Gayi Duniya, Mil Gaye Hum"	Lata Mangeshkar, C. Ramchandra

== Release and reception ==
The film was released at Minerva Theatre, Bombay, on 11 February 1952. The Times of India reported the next day, "Bakshi Brothers' Lavish Costume Musical Fantasy Mobbed By Ardent Fans".

In Filmindia's March 1952 issue, Baburao Patel commented that Madhubala "fails miserably" in her performance, but concluded, "Khazana, however, is less boring than the Hollywood picture [King Solomon's Mines (1950)] and being more frivolous, it is certainly more entertaining, particularly because of the antics of Om Prakash and Gope."
