= Nallavan (1955 film) =

- Directed by: M. Thiruvengadam
- Written by: A. L. Narayanan (dialogue)
- Story by: O. K. Durai; S. Raghavan
- Starring: R. S. Manohar; Serukalathur Sama; P. K. Saraswathi; Rajasulochana
- Cinematography: G. Chandran
- Edited by: S. Surya
- Music by: M. S. Gnanamani
- Production company: Sunrise Productions
- Release date: 5 March 1955
- Running time: 129 minutes
- Country: India
- Language: Tamil

Nallavan (transl. Good man) is a 1955 Indian Tamil-language film directed by M. Thiruvengadam. The film stars R. S. Manohar, Serukalathur Sama, P. K. Saraswathi and Rajasulochana.

== Cast ==
List adapted from the database of Film News Anandan.

Male cast

- R. S. Manohar
- Serukalathur Sama
- M. N. Nambiar
- Mustafa
- V. K. Ramasamy

Female cast

- P. K. Saraswathi
- Rajasulochana
- S. Revathi
- C. K. Saraswathi

== Production ==
Nallavan was produced by Sunrise Productions and directed by M. Thiruvengadam. O. K. Durai and S. Raghavan wrote the story while S. L. Narayanan wrote the dialogues. G. Chandran and S. Surya were in charge of cinematography and editing respectively. S. K. Jayavar and Nayak handled the art direction. Choreography was by T. G. Thangaraj and K. K. Sinha. Still photography was done by S. N. Ragasamy and Tukaram. Shooting took place at the now defunct Film Centre and Star Combines studios.

== Soundtrack ==
The soundtrack of the film was composed by M. S. Gnanamani, while the lyrics were written by Thanjai N. Ramaiah Dass. The soundtrack did not attain popularity.

Song	Singer
"Bharathiye Nam Bharadha"	V. N. Sundaram
"Inbak Kalai Vaanil"	P. Leela
"Nambathe Unnaiye Nambathe"	Thiruchi Loganathan
"Valluvar Vasugi Pol Illara"	P. Leela & G. Kasthoori
"Paalaivana.... Kanneerum Kaanikkaiyaa Kadhal"	P. Leela
"Vazhvil Inbam Kaanuma"	Thiruchi Loganathan & P. Leela
"Gnana Sabaithanil Aadum"	N. L. Ganasaraswathi
"Maaradha Aasaiyellaam Kaanal"	Ghantasala

== Reception ==
Nallavan was released on 5 March 1955. The film was not a commercial success, but historian Randor Guy praised it for the "formidable cast" and "unusual storyline".
