= Kamala Kotnis =

Indian actress active in the 1940s

- Born: Kamalabai; 1928; Hyderabad, Andhra Pradesh, India
- Died: 2000 (aged 71–72); Madras, Tamil Nadu, India
- Occupation: Actress
- Years active: 1940–1949
- Spouse: Panduranga Kotnis (m. 1941)

Kamala Kotnis (1928 – 2000) was an Indian actress who played roles in Telugu and Hindi movies during the 1940s. She is also notable for being Dev Anand's first heroine in Hum Ek Hai, released in 1946.

== Early life ==
Kamala Kotnis was born as Kamalabai in Andhra Pradesh to a Telugu mother and a British father, who was in the army. As a child, she was adopted by a Zamindar. She later married Panduranga Kotnis in 1941, who was the brother of D.S. Kotnis, a leading cinematographer. Her younger sister was married into the royal family of Ramnad estate. Actress Latha Sethupathi is her sister's daughter

== Filmography ==
Year	Title	Role	Language	Notes
1940	Jeevana Jyoti		Telugu	
1942	Bala Nagamma		Telugu	
1943	Chenchu Lakshmi	Chenchu Lakshmi	Telugu	
1943	Bhagyalakshmi		Telugu	
1943	Seeta Rama Jananam		Telugu	
1944	Tahsildar	Rajani	Telugu	
1946	Hum Ek Hai		Hindi	
1946	Gokul		Hindi	
1947	Mera Suhaag		Hindi	
1947	Aage Badho		Hindi	
1949	Seedha Raasta		Hindi	
1949	Sati Ahalya		Hindi	
