= Pardesi (1957 film) =

1957 Indo-Russian film

- Indian poster
- Directed by: Khwaja Ahmad Abbas; Vasili Pronin
- Written by: Khwaja Ahmad Abbas; Mariya Smirnova
- Produced by: Naya Sansar; Mosfilm Studio
- Starring: Oleg Strizhenov; Nargis; Padmini; Prithviraj Kapoor; Balraj Sahni
- Cinematography: Ramchandra; V. V. Nikolaev; Yevgeniy Nikolayevich Andrikanis
- Music by: Anil Biswas; Boris Chaikovsky
- Release date: 1957
- Running time: 110 min.
- Countries: India; Soviet Union
- Languages: Hindi; Russian

Pardesi (Hindi: Pardesi, lit. 'Foreigner'; Russian: Хождение за три моря, romanized: Khozhdenie za tri morya, lit. 'Journey Beyond the Three Seas') is a 1957 film jointly directed by Khwaja Ahmad Abbas and Vasili Pronin.

It was made in two versions, Hindi and Russian, and is based on the travelogues of Russian traveller Afanasy Nikitin, called A Journey Beyond the Three Seas, which is now considered a Russian literary monument.

Made during the high time of Indo-Russian amity, Pardesi is an Indo-Soviet co-production between the state-owned Mosfilm and Khwaja Ahmad Abbas's Naya Sansar International production house.

The film has music by Anil Biswas, and had some memorable hits such as Rasiya Re Man Basiya Re, by Meena Kapoor, Na Dir Dhin Tana Dere Na, by Lata Mangeshkar and was danced to by Padmini. The film was in SovColor, though no colour print of the Hindi version is known to survive in India. Only a black and white copy of the Hindi film survives.

== Synopsis ==
The film tells the story of Afanasy Nikitin (Oleg Strizhenov), a 15th-century Russian trader from Tver who travelled to India (1466–1472) and falls in love with an Indian girl, Champa (Nargis).

== Cast ==
- Oleg Strizhenov as Afanasy Nikitin
- Nargis as Champa
- Padmini as Laxmi
- Prithviraj Kapoor as Mahmood Gawan
- Balraj Sahni as Sakharam
- David as Asad Khan
- Achala Sachdev as Champa's Mother
- Manmohan Krishna as Champa's Father
- Paidi Jairaj as Hassan Beg Khurasani
- Rashid Khan as Scribe
- Stepan Kayukov as Yevsey Ivanovich

== Music ==
Film's music is by Anil Biswas and film songs were written by Prem Dhawan and Ali Sardar Jafri.

1. "Rasiyaa Re Man Basiyaa Re" – Meena Kapoor
2. "Na Dir Dhin Tana Dere Na, Na Ja Na Ja Balam" – Lata Mangeshkar
3. "Phir Milenge Jane Wale Yar Dusvidaniya" – Manna Dey
4. "So Ja Re Lalna So Ja Re Lalna" – Meena Kapoor
5. "Rim Jhim Rim Jhim Barse Pani Re" – Meena Kapoor, Manna Dey
6. "Jai Jai Ramkrishna Hari, Tujh Me Ram Mujh Me Ram" – Manna Dey
7. "Arre Zara Suno Lagakar Dhyan" (2) – Manna Dey
8. "Arre Zara Suno Lagakar Dhyan, Yahan Jan Me Log Mahan" – Manna Dey

The song "Na Dir Dhin Tana Dere Na" is set in raga Gaud Sarang.

== Awards ==
- 1958 Cannes Film Festival – Golden Palm – Nomination
- 1958 Filmfare Best Art Direction Award – M.R. Acharekar
