= Shin Shinaki Boobla Boo =

- Directed by: P. L. Santoshi
- Produced by: P. L. Santoshi
- Starring: Rehana; Ranjan
- Music by: C. Ramchandra
- Production company: Santoshi Productions
- Release date: 1952
- Country: India
- Language: Hindi

Shin Shinaki Boobla Boo is a 1952 Indian Hindi-language film directed by P. L. Santoshi, who also produced it under the banner of Santoshi Productions. It marked Santoshi's production debut, and follows an orphaned young woman, Shin Shinaki (played by Rehana), who seeks vengeance for her parents' murder while romancing a local bandit, Boobla Boo (Ranjan). The film's soundtrack, composed by C. Ramchandra, reflected his experimental style which blended western influences like rock and Latin rhythms with Indian music.

Despite a successful premiere in Bombay in June 1952, Shin Shinaki Boobla Boo was banned by the government for "low moral tone," making it the first film affected by the 1952 Cinematograph Act's overriding powers. The ban was revoked in early 1953 after multiple cuts, but the delay affected its box-office performance.

== Plot ==
Shin Shinaki is orphaned as a young girl after a malicious wealthy man, Taishi, kills both her parents. Seeking immediate revenge, Shin attempts to kill Taishi, but fails and is imprisoned for ten years. Shin vows to keep a physical wound on her body unhealed until she has killed Taishi and avenged her parents.

Ten years later, Shin finishes her sentence and emerges from prison as a young woman. She returns to Taishi's former residence, only to learn that Taishi has passed away. However, upon discovering that Taishi has a surviving son, Shin vows to complete her oath by killing his son instead. Her search leads her to a religious monastery (matha), where a famous astrologer named Chiang—who is said to know the past, present, and future—is expected to arrive. Shin joins the matha in hopes of learning the whereabouts of Taish's son from Chiang.

Before Shin joins the Math, she meets and falls in love with a local bandit named Boobla Boo. He believes that a beauty like Shin belongs in a bandit's cave rather than a monastery, so he attacks the Math, carries Shin away with him, and brings her to the bandit colony. However, the chief bandit demands Shin for himself. Refusing to allow this, Boobla returns a stolen chhatra (royal umbrella) back to the matha after enduring a dangerous journey through pythons and gorillas, thereby earning Shin's re-entry into the monastery.

Back at the matha, preparations are underway for a sacred festival where Chiang is scheduled to appear. Shin eagerly awaits his arrival and confides in Boobla that she plans to learn the identity of her enemy's son from Chiang and kill him. Boobla promises to help her and leaves to sharpen a knife.

When Chiang arrives at the matha, Shin discovers that the enemy's son she intends to kill is none other than her lover, Boobla Boo. Unable to bring herself to harm him, Shin attempts to end her life with poison. Realizing the tragic truth, Boobla rushes to her, places the sharpened knife into Shin's hand, and drives the blade into his own stomach.

== Cast ==
- Rehana as Shin Shinaki
  - Baby Tabassum as young Shin Shinaki
- Ranjan as Boobla Boo
- Tiwari as Taishi
- Sadhana Bose as Sumaiti, Shin's mother
- Veera
- Radhakrishen
- Mumtaz Ali
- Samson
- Indu Paul
- Shama Gulnar

== Production ==
The Encyclopedia of Indian Cinema describes the film as an "orientalist fantasy" which drew inspiration from the modern dance ballets that Sadhana Bose had been associated with on stage. Director P. L. Santoshi collaborated with his regular music composer, C. Ramchandra, to craft the film's musical style.

=== Music ===
Ramchandra's soundtrack incorporated experiments with jazz and Latin American rhythms. Key tracks from the film include:

- "Han Dai Taka Lai Han Dai Kali Aie": A song sung by Sumaiti featuring a fast-paced chorus in a question-and-answer format.
- "Aare Baba"
- "Kuch Chahelen Ho, Kuch Charchein Ho"

== Reception ==
Shin Shinaki Boobla Boo premiered in Bombay on 27 June 1952 and was well received during its opening week, as reported by The Times of India.

Critic Baburao Patel of Filmindia described the film as "stupid and boring stuff all round". Patel deemed Santoshi unsuitable to direct tragic stories, instead suggesting him to focus on comedies. While he praised Rehana's performance, Patel was also critical of other actors.

The film was also reviewed in The Times of India on 20 July 1952.

== Censorship and release ==
Prior to the film's release in June 1952, it had been passed by the Censor Board of India with a Universal (U) certificate.

However, the film became the first one to be affected by the central government's newly granted authority under the Indian Cinematograph Act passed that year to overrule decisions made by the Censor Board. The Ministry of Information and Broadcasting stepped in to ban the film, citing its "low moral tone" and stating that it "throws the glamour of romance and heroism over criminal characters, treats sacred subjects irreverently and is, in consequence, opposed to the interests of public decency and morality."

The ban was eventually revoked in early 1953 after the film was reviewed by the Censor Board of India and passed for public viewing after multiple cuts. However, the release delay affected the film's commercial prospects.
