= Saiyan Se Bhaile Milanwa =

1965 Indian Bhojpuri-language film

- Directed by: P. L. Santoshi
- Written by: P. L. Santoshi
- Screenplay by: P. L. Santoshi
- Starring: Sujit Kumar; Sayeeda Khan; Sabita Chatterjee; Jahar Roy
- Music by: Robin Chatterjee
- Production company: Technic Enterprises
- Release date: 1965
- Running time: 135 minutes
- Country: India
- Language: Bhojpuri

Saiyan Se Bhaile Milanwa (Bhojpuri for When I met my lover) is an Indian Bhojpuri-language film directed by P. L. Santoshi and released in 1965. In addition to directing the film, P.L. Santoshi also wrote the story and screenplay for the film. Saiyan Se Bhaile Milanwa stars Sujit Kumar, Sayeeda Khan, Sabita Chatterjee and Jahar Roy, with music composed by Robin Chatterjee. In the same year that Saiyan Se Bhaile Milanwa was released, Sujit Kumar and Sayeeda Khan had also been paired together as lead stars in the Hindi film Ek Saal Pehle (1965) directed by Dharam Kumar.

Saiyan Se Bhaile Milanwa was produced soon after the commercial success of three Bhojpuri films—Ganga Maiyya Tohe Piyari Chadhaibo, Laagi Nahi Chhute Ram, and Bidesiya—all released during the initial years (1962–63) of the “first phase of the Bhojpuri cinema”, which extended from 1962 to 1968. Ganga Maiyya Tohe Piyari Chadhaibo, made on a budget of ₹5 lakhs, earned approximately ₹75 lakhs, yielding a fifteen fold return. Laagi Nahi Chhute Ram was described as a “massive hit”, while Bidesiya was regarded as a “major hit. The collective success of these three productions attracted considerable attention from producers and financiers looking to invest in a rapidly developing cinematic market. Joining this surge of interest were the creators of Saiyan Se Bhaile Milanwa, who placed Sujit Kumar at the forefront, capitalizing on his ascent as a leading figure in Bhojpuri films.

== Plot ==
Saiyan Se Bhaile Milanwa centers on a devoted wife whose unwavering loyalty shines through as she tenderly cares for her husband, helping him recover from severe memory loss caused by a tragic accident. Her selfless sacrifices and gentle persistence gradually restore his health and recollection of their shared life. Amidst family tensions and societal pressures, her love ultimately triumphs, reaffirming the timeless bond of marital devotion in classic Bhojpuri storytelling.

== Cast ==
- Sujit Kumar as the husband suffering from memory loss after an accident
- Sayeeda Khan as the devoted wife who cares for her husband
- Sabita Chatterjee
- Jahar Roy

== Soundtrack ==
The film's soundtrack was composed by Robin Chatterjee, with lyrics credited to P. L. Santoshi on the song "Dhire Dhire Bole" and to Robin Chatterjee on "Nirmohi Daga Deke".

| No. | Title | Singers | Ref. |
|---|---|---|---|
| 1 | "Dhire Dhire Bole" | Mohammed Rafi, Sandhya Mukherjee | |
| 2 | "Nirmohi Daga Deke" | Suman Kalyanpur | |
