= Sunehre Din =

- Poster
- Directed by: Satish Nigam
- Story by: Satish Nigam
- Produced by: Madan Lal Mehrotra
- Starring: Raj Kapoor; Roop Kamal; Nigar Sultana; Rehana
- Music by: Gyan Dutt
- Release date: 1949
- Country: India
- Language: Hindi

Sunehre Din (transl. Golden days) is a 1949 Indian Hindi-language romance film directed by Satish Nigam and produced by Madan Lal Mehrotr. The film stars Raj Kapoor, Roop Kamal, Nigar Sultana and Rehana, with Ramesh Sinha, Indumati, Heera, Kamalakant and Mahendra in supporting roles. The soundtrack was composed by Gyan Dutt. The film was based on a story written by Satish Nigam.

== Plot ==
Premendra is a singer in All India Radio. He became a sensation at that time as most of the youth became his fan base. College girls, including Renuka, Asha and Lata, had crushes on him. Renuka is middle-class whereas Lata and Asha were rich. One day all three of them went to meet Premendra. Meanwhile, Premendra dresses himself as a drummer in the event while another person is addressed as Premendra. Renuka is helped by Premendra in an accident outside the event and they fall in love. Within a few days Asha and Lata learn about the real Premendra and Asha also starts to love him. Asha being from a rich family succeeds in marriage alliance with Premendras family. Premendras father also forces him for this marriage. Asha then realises that Premendra and Renuka love each other. Asha sacrifices her love for them and migrates to another place.

== Cast ==
- Rehana as Renuka
- Raj Kapoor as Premendra
- Roop Kamal as Asha
- Ramesh Sinha as Barrister Sinha
- Indumati as Renu's mother
- Heera as Kiran
- Kamla Kant as Sir Rajendra Singh
- Mahindar as Dhillon
- Haroon as Bedil Tabalchi
- Phuman as Phuman
- Nigar as Lata

== Soundtrack ==
The music department is a combination of lyricist D N Madhok and composer Gyan Dutt.

- "Umango Ke Din Beete Jaye "-Geeta Ghosh Roy Chowdhuri (Geeta Dutt), Shamshad Begum, Sulochana Kadam
- "Baharo Ne Jise Chheda Hai"- Mukesh Chand Mathur (Mukesh)
- "Lo Ji Sun Lo Tumse Kahte Hai"- Mukesh Chand Mathur (Mukesh), Surinder Kaur
- "Dil Lagakar Unse "- Kalyani Das, Shamshad Begum
- "Dil Do Nainon Mein "- Mukesh Chand Mathur (Mukesh), Surinder Kaur
- "Jiya Ka Diya "- G. M. Durrani, Geeta Ghosh Roy Chowdhuri (Geeta Dutt), Khan Mastana, Shamshad Begum
- "Hum Mast Dilo Ko Lekar "- G. M. Durrani, Kalyani Das, Khan Mastana, Shamshad Begum
- "Maine Dekhi Jag Ki Reet "- Mukesh Chand Mathur (Mukesh), Shamshad Begum
- "Thandi Thandi Hawa Jo Aaye "- Shamshad Begum
- "Tum Sang Ankhiya Mila Ke "-Surinder Kaur

== Reception ==
Karan Bali wrote on Upperstall.com, "This is yet another creaky old film that has not held up well at all. A stupid, insufferable story with an equally unimaginative screenplay, Sunehre Din makes for tedious viewing today."
