= Chham Chhama Chham =

- Directed by: P. L. Santoshi
- Starring: Kishore Kumar; Rehana; Pran
- Music by: O. P. Nayyar
- Release date: 1952
- Country: India
- Language: Hindi

Chham Chhama Chham is a 1952 Indian Hindi-language comedy film directed by P. L. Santoshi. It stars Kishore Kumar, Rehana, and Pran; and features a soundtrack composed by O. P. Nayyar. The film revolves around Kumar's character, a carefree young man who joins an acting school.

Chham Chhama Chham was a box-office success and helped establish Kumar's appeal as a leading actor. According to Kishore Kumar: The Ultimate Biography (2022), the film offered Kumar an opportunity to fill a gap in then-Hindi cinema for a comedian who could lead films.

The film's original prints are no longer known to exist.

== Plot ==
Kishore Kumar plays a happy-go-lucky young man who joins the Bharkamkar School of Arts, an institution where aspiring performers are trained in stagecraft and acting. The film follows his antics in the world of drama companies, drawing on Kumar's own experience with the theatrical scene.

== Cast ==
- Kishore Kumar
- Rehana
- Pran
- Mohana
- Radhakrishen
