= Chenchu Lakshmi (1943 film) =

1943 film by S. Saundara Rajan

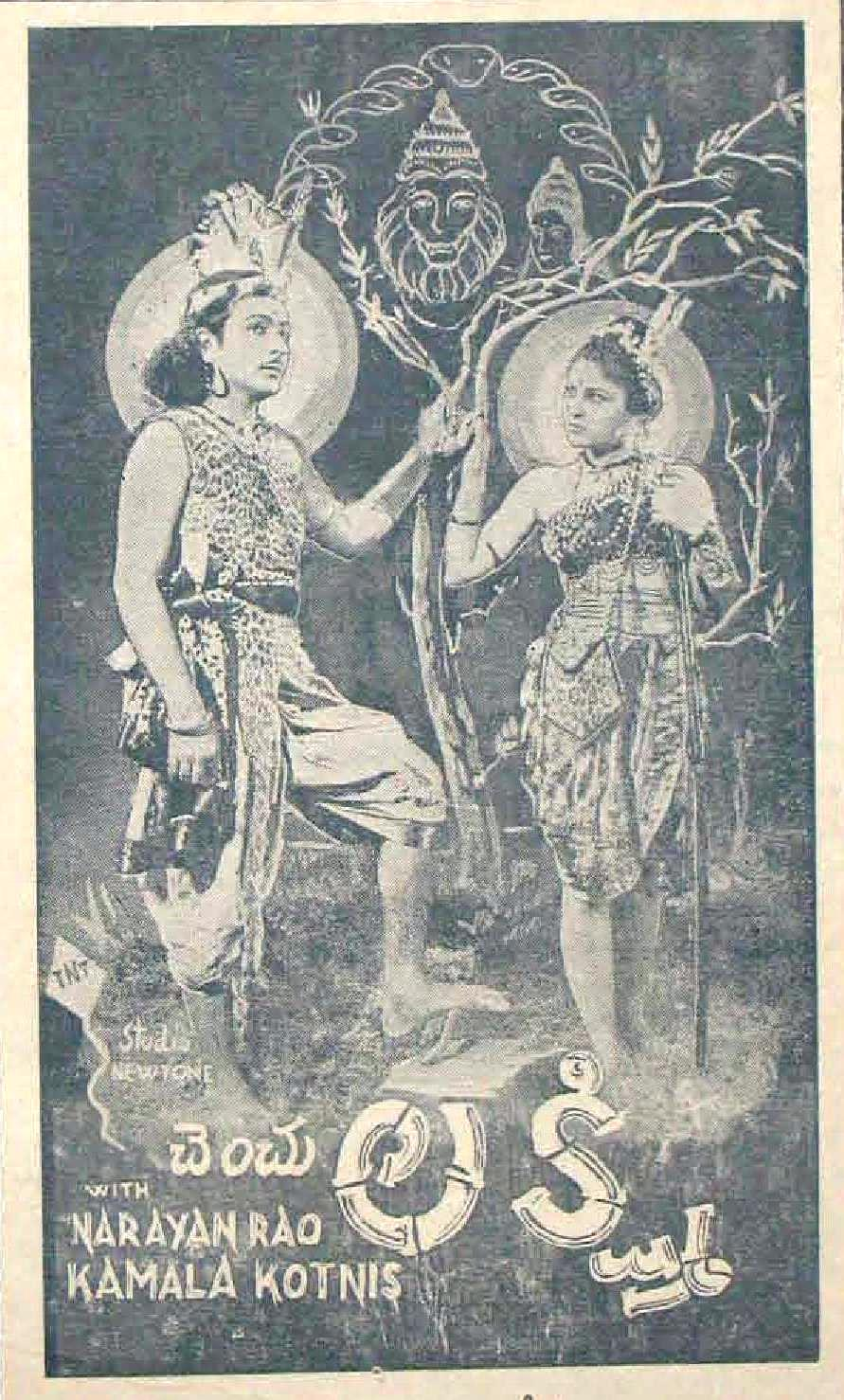
- Chencu Lakshmi film poster
- Directed by: S. Saundara Rajan
- Written by: Samudrala Sr. (Dialogues)
- Story by: Samudrala Sr.
- Produced by: S. Saundara Rajan
- Starring: Kamala Kotnis; C. H. Narayana Rao
- Cinematography: Jiten Banerjee
- Music by: Songs; S. Rajeswara Rao; C. R. Subbaraman; R. N. Chinnayya; Score; R. Balasaraswathi Devi
- Production company: Tamil Nadu Talkies
- Release date: 1943
- Country: India
- Language: Telugu

Chenchu Lakshmi is a 1943 Indian Telugu-language mythological film produced and directed by S. Saundara Rajan. The film was written by Samudrala Sr. and starred Kamala Kotnis, C. H. Narayana Rao, and Nagayya. Kamala Kotnis' beauty, dance and acting are the main attractions of this film.

== Plot ==
The Sikhanayaka of the Ahobila tribe prayed to Vishnu to give him his daughter. Vishnu, who had given her so, said that he would marry her himself. Thus the child born to the hill tribe leader was "Chenchu Lakshmi". Growing up as an adventurer. Vishnu murti came to earth in the form of Narahari and fell in love with that Lakshmi. The leader, who did not know Narahari's true form, put him to many tests and then married his daughter to Narahari.

== Cast ==
- Kamala Kotnis as Chenchu Laksmi
- Nagayya as Chenchu Lakshmi's father
- C. H. Narayana Rao as Vishnu/Varaha
- Rushyendramani as Adilakshmi
- Satyam Lanka
- Garudachaari

== Music ==
The 12 songs and poems in the film were composed jointly by S. Rajeswara Rao, C. R. Subbaraman and R. N. Chinnayya written by Samudrala Sr.

- "Athi Bhagyasaali Nari Paricharana Kamala Pujari" - Rushyendramani
- "Aadadi Adade, Aadanerchi Vetada Nerchina" - Rushyendramanii
- "Intakanna Naakedi Bhagyamu" - V. Nagayya
- "Yeri Yeri Na Samaanulika Yeri" - R. Balasaraswathi Devi
- "Yelukovayya Obulesha Mammelukovayya" - R. Balasaraswathi Devi
- "Kanipanchitiva Naarasimha, Kanikarinchinava Ee Leela" - Kamala Kotnis
- "Kamalaanaatha" - Jagannatha Kamala Bhavarchita Padakamala
- "Kamalaanaatha" - Jagannatha Kamalaa Mohana
- "Dhanyudara Ne Narasimha Na Janma Tarinchenura Deva" - Nagayya
- "Nijamaadu Dana Needana, Ninu Nammi Manedana" - Rushyendramani
- "Neede Baaramu Gadaa Deva Todu Needa Neeve Gadaa" - Nagayya
- "Pove Kadali Palugaki, Popove" - Rushyendramanii, R. Balasaraswathi Devi
- "Madhuramuga Ahaa Madhuramuga" - Balasaraswati, S. Venkatraman

Nijamadu dana Needana
song

== Reception ==
Famous author Gudipati Venkatachalam said in his Musings (page 280, 5th edition 2005):

I listened to audio of the film of Chenchu Lakshmi for two nights in a row. Whatever the story may be, the weeping in the film still makes me shudder. Atla Padaro is a good song! - The song "Kanipinchitiva, Narasimha" was sung very melodiously. It would be a happy thing to see that Narasimham. But it's heartbreaking to hear that.
