= Tadbir =

- Directed by: Jayant Desai
- Written by: Munsi Sagar Hussain
- Story by: Mohanlal G. Dave
- Produced by: Jayant Desai
- Starring: K. L. Saigal; Suraiya; Mubarak; Rehana
- Cinematography: Dronacharya
- Edited by: N. V. Morajkar
- Music by: Lal Mohammad
- Production company: Jayant Desai Productions
- Distributed by: Jayant Desai Productions
- Release date: 1945
- Running time: 121 minutes
- Country: India
- Language: Hindi

Tadbir (transl. Fate) is a 1945 Indian Hindi language film. It was the fifth-highest-grossing Indian film of 1945. The film was directed by Jayant Desai under his Jayan Desai Productions banner and had music composed by Lal Mohammed, with lyrics written by Swami Ramanand Saraswati. The film starred K. L. Saigal, Suraiya, Mubarak, Jillobai, Rehana and Shashi Kapoor.

== Cast ==
- K. L. Saigal as Kanhaiyalal
- Suraiya as Saguna
- Mubarak as Jwalaprasad
- Jilloo
- Rehana
- Rewashankar Marwadi
- Raja Rani
- Shashiraj
- Ameena
- Shalini
- Gharpure
- Raja Joshi
