= Begum Para =

Indian actress (1926–2008)

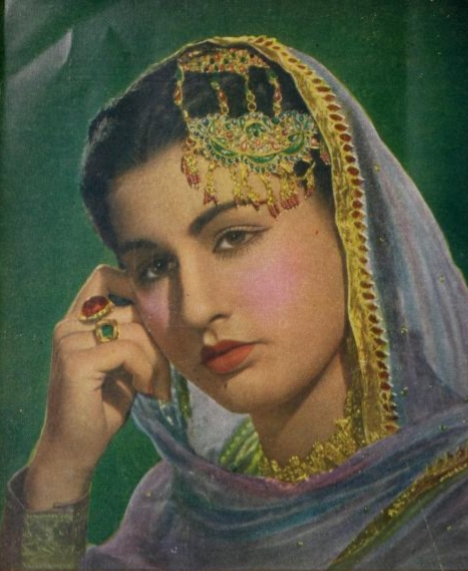
- Para in the film Shalimar (1945).
- Born: Zubeda Ul Haq; 25 December 1926; Jhelum, Punjab, British India (present-day Punjab, Pakistan)
- Died: 9 December 2008 (aged 81); Mumbai, Maharashtra, India
- Occupations: Actress; Film Producer
- Years active: 1944–1956; 1982–1987; 2007
- Spouse: Nasir Khan (m. 1958; died 1974)
- Children: 3, including Ayub Khan
- Relatives: Dilip Kumar (brother-in-law); Rukhsana Sultana (niece); Amrita Singh (grandniece); Saira Banu (sister-in-law)

Begum Para (née Zubeda Ul Haq; 25 December 1926 – 9 December 2008) was an Indian Hindi film actress. She was active mostly in the 1940s and 1950s. After being away from the industry for more than 20 years, she appeared briefly in the 1980s & after another 20 years hiatus, she returned to films with her last role in Sanjay Leela Bhansali's Saawariya (2007) as Sonam Kapoor's grandmother. In her time during the 1950s, she was considered a 'glamour girl' of Bollywood, so much so, that Life magazine had a section devoted to her photographs.

== Early life ==
Begum Para was born as Zubeda Ul Haq in Jhelum in British India (present day in Punjab, Pakistan) to an aristocratic Punjabi family. Her father, Mian Ehsan-ul-Haq, was a judge from Jalandhar who, at some point in his life, entered the judicial service of the princely state of Bikaner, which is now part of northern Rajasthan, where he eventually became chief justice of its highest court. He was a fine cricketer of his time. Her family settled in Aligarh. She was brought up very disciplined yet liberal. She was educated at the Aligarh Muslim University. Her elder sister, Zarina Haq, married Madan Mohan Bimbet, and the couple had a daughter Meenu Bimbet (who later became known for her political activism as Rukhsana Sultana). Bimbet's daughter Amrita Singh (Para's grandniece) went on to become a Bollywood star in the 1980s. Also, Para's elder brother Masrurul Haq, had gone off to Bombay in the late 1930s to become an actor. There he had met and fell in love with the Bengali actress Protima Dasgupta, and married her.

Whenever she visited them in Bombay, she was quite taken up with the glitzy world of her sister-in-law. She used to accompany her on many occasions and get-togethers. She was often scouted and offered roles during this period. One such offer came from Sashadhar Mukherjee and Devika Rani.

== Career ==
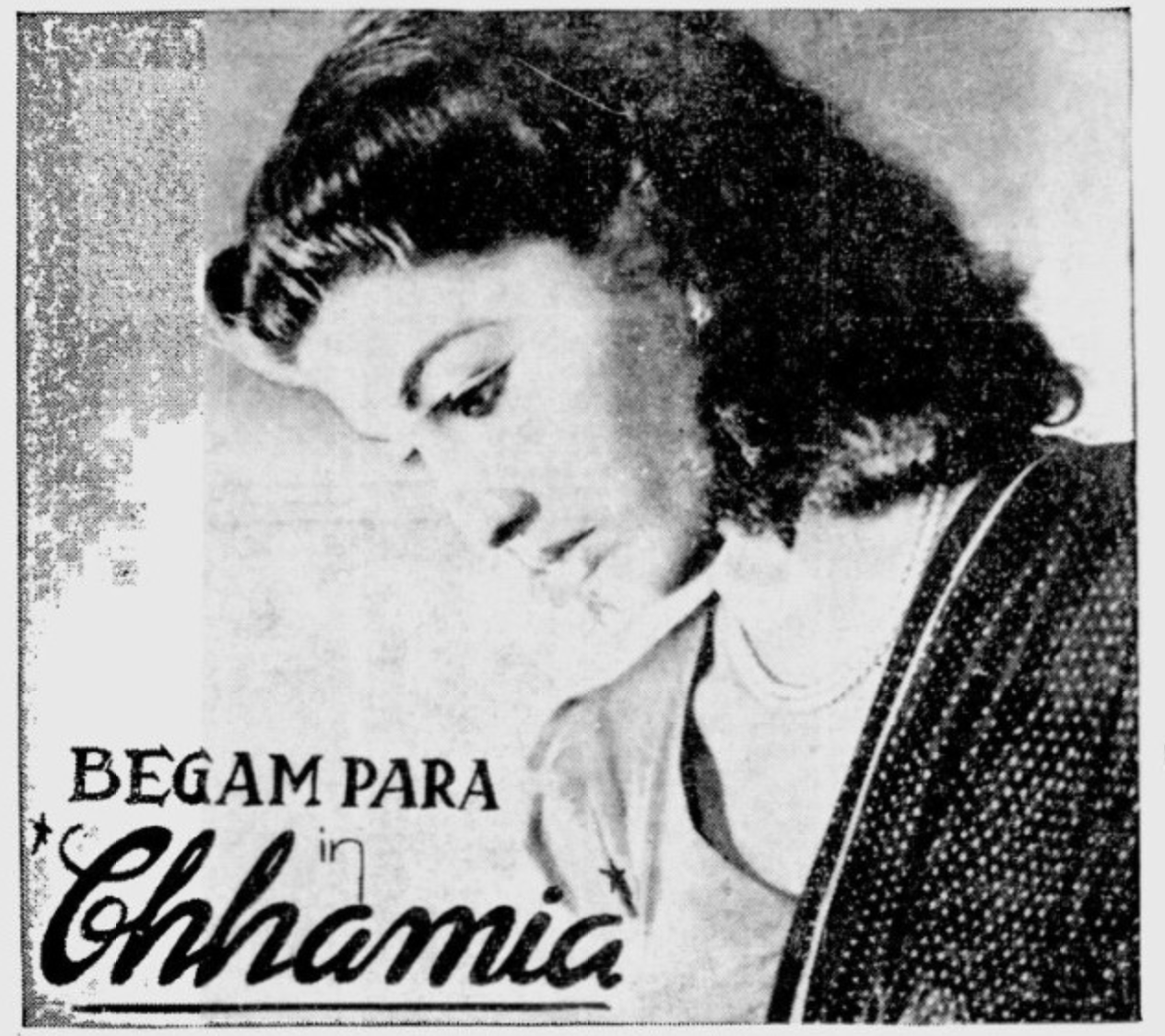
Advertisement for Begam Para in Chhamia, from a 1945 newspaper

Begum Para's first break turned out to be 1944 film Chand, from Prabhat Studios in Poona. Prem Adib was the hero, and Sitara Devi was the vamp in the film. It did extremely well and Para started getting paid about Rs. 1500 a month. Soon after, she and her sister-in-law Protima made a film called Chhamia (1945) based on the novel ‘Pygmalion’, which again was a huge success. Para signed a lot of films after Chhamia, but she couldn't quite establish herself as an actress. Because she had a highly scandalous image, people always gave her the role of glamour doll in most films. She did not mind this because she always played herself on screen.

She did Sohni Mahiwal (1946) and Zanjeer (1947) with Ishwarlal and Dikshit; Neel Kamal (1947) with Raj Kapoor; Mehendi (1947) with Nargis; Suhaag Raat (1948) with Bharat Bhushan and Geeta Bali; Jhalka (1948); and Meherbani (1950) with Ajit Khan. She also worked in Ustad Pedro (1951), produced and directed by the then well-known actor, Sheikh Mukhtar. It was a fun film, and was packed with action, romance, and stunts.

In 1951, she posed for photographer James Burke for a Life magazine photo shoot. Para's last role was in the movie Kar Bhala in 1956. She was also offered to play Nigar Sultana’s role 'Bahar' in Mughal-e-Azam (1960). However, she refused to play the role because she considered it against her image.

After staying away from acting for more than two decades, she made a brief comeback during the 1980s with special appearances in the television film Tadap (1982) and in the film Madadgaar (1987). After yet another two decades hiatus, she made her final appearance on the silver screen in Sanjay Leela Bhansali's Saawariya in 2007 as Sonam Kapoor's grandmother. The film was released a year before her death in 2008.

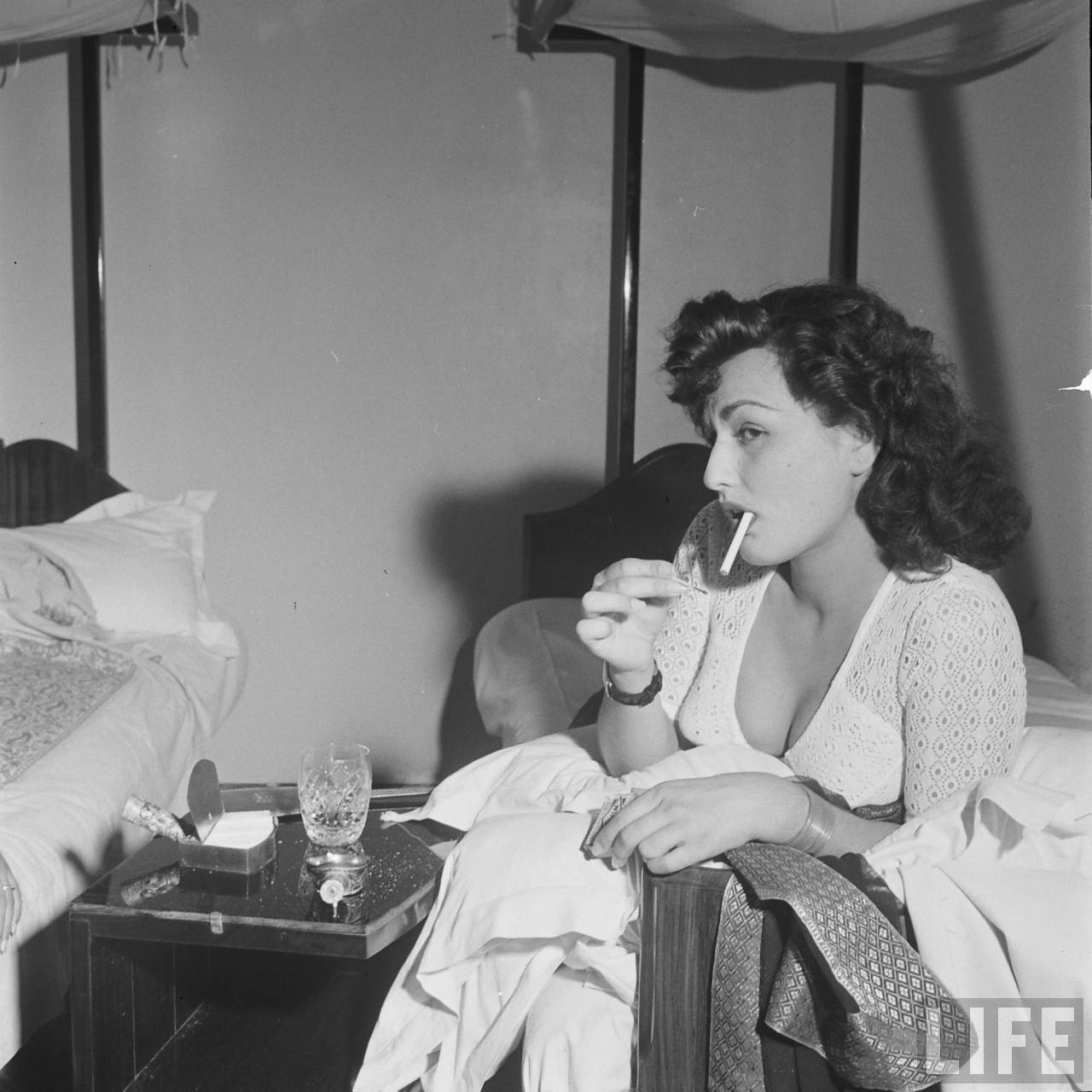
James Burke's photography of Bollywood actress Begum Para, from Life magazine, December 31, 1951

== Personal life ==
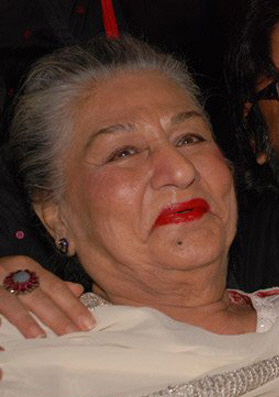
Para in her old age

She married actor Nasir Khan, who was an actor and filmmaker, and the younger brother of Bollywood star Dilip Kumar. He was previously married to Suraiya Nazir (daughter of Nazir Ahmed Khan) and also had a daughter Naheed Khan. After divorcing Suraiya Nazir, Nasir Khan married Begum Para in 1958. They had three children, daughter Lubna and sons Nadir and actor Ayub Khan. She had three granddaughters, Kichu Dandiya a jewellery designer, Tahura Khan and Zohra Khan. Her husband died in 1974. Following her husband's death, she briefly moved to Pakistan in 1975 to be with her family, two years later she relocated back to India.

== Death ==
She died in her sleep on 9 December 2008 at the age of 81.

== Filmography ==
Year	Film	Role	Notes
1944	Chand	Chand	Debut film
1945	Chhamia		Also co-producer
1946	Shalimar		
1946	Sohni Mahiwal		
1947	Duniya Ek Sarai		
1947	Mehndi		
1947	Neel Kamal	Queen (mother) & Princess (daughter)	Dual role
1947	Zanjeer		
1948	Jharna		Also co-producer
1948	Shahnaz		
1948	Sohag Raat	Paro	
1948	Suhagi		
1949	Dada		
1950	Mehrbani		
1950	Pagle		Also co-producer & singer
1951	Ustad Pedro		
1952	Najaria		
1953	Dara		
1953	Laila Majnu	Zarina	
1953	Naya Ghar		
1954	Pehli Jhalak	Wresting referee in Sunder's (Om Prakash's) dream sequence where he wrestles against Dara Singh (himself)	
1955	Duniya Gol Hai		
1955	Jalwa		
1955	Lutera		Opposite husband Nasir Khan
1955	Sau Ka Note		
1955	Shahzada		
1955	Sitara		
1956	Kar Bhala		Opposite husband Nasir Khan
1956	Kismet Ka Khel	Kusum	
1957	Aadmi	Radha	Opposite husband Nasir Khan
1958	Do Mastane		
1982	Tadap		Television film
1987	Madadgaar		
2007	Saawariya	Nabila	Final role & film
