= Nirala (film) =

- Theatrical release poster
- Directed by: Devendra Mukherjee
- Written by: P. L. Santoshi
- Starring: Dev Anand; Madhubala
- Cinematography: G. Kale G. T. Kale
- Edited by: Viththal Bankar
- Music by: C. Ramchandra
- Release date: 11 June 1950
- Country: India
- Language: Hindi
- Box office: est. ₹ 6 million

Nirala (transl. "Different") is a 1950 Bollywood film directed by Devendra Mukherjee. It stars Dev Anand and, Madhubala in lead roles, along with Mazhar Khan who plays the main antagonist. Mumtaz Ali, Leela Mishra, Yakub play the supporting roles. It revolves around a doctor who unknowingly forces a girl, who is in love with him, to marry a king.

With profits of ₹ 6 million, the film was a commercial success, which lead Anand and Madhubala doing seven more films together. It is specially noted for its song "Mehfil Mein Jal Uthi Shama" (picturised on Madhubala, sung by Lata Mangeshkar).

== Plot ==
After studying abroad for several years, a young doctor Anand (Dev Anand) returns home to inherit ownership of a rural village. En route to the village he encounters a girl, Poonam (Madhubala) whose mother (Leela Mishra) needs treatment. He secures lodgings in their house. A romance blossoms, but the girl's impecunious gambler brother (Yakub) marries her off to King Sangram (Mazhar Khan) and the couple are parted. When Poonam falls ill, Anand as the doctor is called and their lives are imperiled by the King's suspicious sister leading to a melodramatic denouement. Many misunderstandings and tears follow with Poonam committing suicide just before Anand reaches her.

== Cast ==
- Dev Anand as Dr. Anand
- Madhubala as Poonam
- Mazhar Khan as Raja Sangram Singh
- Mumtaz Ali as Rani
- Yakub as Poonam's Brother
- Leela Mishra as Poonam's Mother

== Soundtrack ==
The music of Nirala was composed by C. Ramchandra. The film's director Pyarelal Santoshi also wrote the lyrics of the songs. Nirala's music was an instant hit among the audience; most popular tracks were "Mehfil Mein Jal Uthi Shama", "Aisi Mohabbat Se Hum Baaj Aaye" and "Mohabbat Meri Rang Laane Lagi".

Song	Singer
"Mehfil Mein Jal Uthi"	Lata Mangeshkar
"Majboor Meri Aankhen"	Lata Mangeshkar
"Aisi Mohabbat Se Hum"	Lata Mangeshkar
"Chandni Raat Mein Jane"	Lata Mangeshkar
"Zor Laga Do, Zor Laga Do"	Lata Mangeshkar
"Mera Dil Hai Nikhattu"	C. Ramchandra
"Kehnewale Sach Keh Gaye Hai, Husn Bhara Hai"	C. Ramchandra, Mohammed Rafi
"Dil Mein Kisi Ke Rehna Ho To Kiski Ijaazat Chahiye"	C. Ramchandra, Shamshad Begum
"Mohabbat Meri"	Shamshad Begum

== Reception ==
=== Critical reception ===
In the review written by Cineplot, Nirala was described as the "most exasperating and irritating picture". Further it was written that, "It has a story that mocks common sense and makes light of reason. There is no motivation, for the actions of its characters have been repeatedly told to us." However it praised Madhubala's performance and called her "good enough in her role".

=== Box office ===
Despite negative reviews, Nirala was a box-office hit; its success played a crucial role in establishing Madhubala as a leading lady of the time.
