= Mohan (1947 film) =

- Poster
- Directed by: Anadinath Bannerjee
- Starring: Dev Anand Butt Kashar, Hemavathi, Vimala Vasishta]
- Music by: Husnlal Batish
- Release date: 1947
- Country: India
- Language: Hindi

Mohan is a 1947 Bollywood film directed by Anadinath Bannerjee and starring Dev Anand and Butt Kashar.

== Cast ==
- Dev Anand as Mohan
- Hemavati
- Alka Achrekar
- Vimla Vashishth

== Songs ==
Sabke Liye Kaheen Na Kaheen Ghar Bana Diya

Music Director: Husnlal - Bhagatram
Lyricist: Qamar Jalalabadi

Duniya Se Darne Wale Do Din Ki Zindagi Hai

Music Director: Husnlal - Bhagatram
Lyricist: Qamar Jalalabadi

Mere Jeevan Mein Aayi Bahaar

Singer: Jawahar Kaul
Music Director: Husnlal - Bhagatram
Lyricist: Qamar Jalalabadi

Kahaan Chali Diwani Kiski Yaad Aayi

Music Director: Husnlal - Bhagatram
Lyricist: Qamar Jalalabadi

Tum Ho Mere Raajkumar Paas Tumhare Pyar Bhi Hai

Music Director: Husnlal - Bhagatram
Lyricist: Qamar Jalalabadi

Kehta Hai Pyar Mera Mujhe Bhool Na Jaana

Music Director: Husnlal - Bhagatram
Lyricist: Qamar Jalalabadi

Kab Tak Mere Bhagwan Tu Sota Hi Rahega

Singer: Jawahar Kaul
Music Director: Husnlal - Bhagatram
Lyricist: Qamar Jalalabadi
