= Aage Badho =

Bollywood movie from 1947

- Poster
- Directed by: Yeshwant Pethkar
- Produced by: Prabhat Film Company
- Starring: Dev Anand; Khurshid; Kamala Kotnis
- Music by: Sudhir Phadke
- Release date: 1947
- Country: India
- Language: Hindi

Aage Badho (lit. 'March Ahead') is a 1947 Hindi language movie directed by Yeshwant Pithkar, starring Dev Anand, Khurshid, Vasant Thengdi, Kusum Deshpande, and Madhukar Apte.

== Cast ==
- Dev Anand
- Khurshid
- Kamala Kotnis
- Vasant Thengdi
- Kusum Deshpande
- Madhukar Apte

== Music ==
1. "Aao Jhoom Raha" – Khursheed
2. "Duniya Pyari Pyari Re" – Khursheed
3. "Mai Khoj Khoj Kar Haari" – Khursheed
4. "Naina Rasile Madbhare Mai Albeli Naar" – Manik Varma
5. "Sawan Ki Ghatao Dhire Dhire Aana" – Mohammed Rafi, Khursheed
6. "Suno Suno Hey Nar Nari" – Manna Dey
7. "Taqdir Me Likha Hai" – Khursheed
