= Shehnai (1947 film) =

- Directed by: P. L. Santoshi
- Written by: P. L. Santoshi
- Story by: P. L. Santoshi
- Produced by: Filmistan
- Starring: Kishore Kumar (Not the singer); Rehana; Indumati; Nasir Khan
- Cinematography: K. H. Kapadia
- Edited by: Pundalik
- Music by: C. Ramchandra
- Release date: 15 August 1947
- Running time: 133 min.
- Country: India
- Language: Hindi

Shehnai is a 1947 Indian Hindi language film directed by P. L. Santoshi, starring Kishore Kumar (Not the singer), Indumati, Radhakrishan, V.H. Desai and Rehana. It was the fifth highest grossing Indian film of 1947. Santoshi went on make the classic, Barsaat Ki Raat (1960) starring Madhubala and Bharat Bhushan.

== Cast ==
- Nasir Khan as Rajesh
- Rehana as Prameela
- Indumati as Zamindar's Daughter
- Kishore Kumar (Not the singer) as Police Inspector
- Dulari
- Leela Mishra
- Mumtaz Ali
- Niranjan Sharma
- Kumkum
- S.L. Puri
- Rekha
- Radhakishan as Zamindar's Secretary
- Shreenath
- Shobha Thakur
- V. H. Desai as Comedian

== Soundtrack ==
Music of the film was given by C. Ramchandra and lyrics were by P. L. Santoshi.

Track listing
No.	Title	Lyrics	Music	Singer(s)	Length
1.	"Jai Krisna Hare Shre Krishna Hare"	P. L. Santoshi	C. Ramchandra	Binapani Mukherjee	4:40
2.	"Hame Kya Pata Tha, Maar Katari Mar Jaana"	P. L. Santoshi	C. Ramchandra	Amirbai Karnataki	4:16
3.	"Chhuk Chhuk Chhaiya Chhaiya, Sone Ki Machhariya"	P. L. Santoshi	C. Ramchandra	Meena Kapoor, Binapani Mukherjee	4:07
4.	"Jawani Ki Rail Chali Jaye Re (version 1)"	P. L. Santoshi	C. Ramchandra	Geeta Dutt, C. Ramchandra, Lata Mangeshkar	5:23
5.	"Aji Aao Mohabbat Ki Khaale Kasam"	P. L. Santoshi	C. Ramchandra	C. Ramchandra, Amirbai Karnataki	3:00
6.	"Chadhti Jawani Mein Jhulo, Jholo Meri Rani"	P. L. Santoshi	C. Ramchandra	Geeta Dutt, C. Ramchandra, Binapani Mukherjee	4:25
7.	"Hamare Angana, Ho Hamare Angana, Aaj Baje Shehnai"	P. L. Santoshi	C. Ramchandra	Shamshad Begum, Amirbai Karnataki	5:26
8.	"Tirchi Topi Walo Se Ha Bachh Ke Rehna Ji (Pehli Mulakat Me Dil Aapka Hua)"	P. L. Santoshi	C. Ramchandra	Shamshad Begum, C. Ramchandra	5:00
9.	"Aana Meri Jaan Meri Jaan Sunday Ke Sunday (Part 1)"	P. L. Santoshi	C. Ramchandra	C. Ramchandra, Meena Kapoor	4:33
10.	"Aana Meri Jaan Meri Jaan Sunday Ke Sunday (Part 2)"	P. L. Santoshi	C. Ramchandra	C. Ramchandra, Meena Kapoor	4:37
11.	"Jawani Ki Rail Chali Jaye Re (version 2)"	P. L. Santoshi	C. Ramchandra	Amirbai Karnataki, C. Ramchandra, Meena Kapoor
Total length:					46:22
