= Hum Ek Hain (1946 film) =

1946 film by P. L. Santoshi

- Film poster
- Directed by: P. L. Santoshi
- Written by: Saleh Mohammed Qureshi; Tony Lazarus; P. L. Santoshi
- Starring: Durga Khote; Kamala Kotnis; Dev Anand; Rehana; Rehman; Ranjit Kumari; R. V. Rane; Ram Singh
- Cinematography: Surendra Pai
- Music by: Husnlal Bhagatram
- Production company: Prabhat Film Company
- Release date: 8 June 1946
- Running time: 121 minutes
- Country: India
- Language: Hindi

Hum Ek Hain (transl. We are one) is a 1946 Indian Hindi-language film co-written and directed by P. L. Santoshi in his directorial debut. The film stars Durga Khote, along with Kamala Kotnis, Dev Anand, Rehana and Rehman in their cinematic acting debut. It was released on 8 June 1946.

== Plot ==
Zamindari Ma, the old landlady of a village supports its people during a famine and raises three orphaned children of differing religions. The children, although encouraged to practice their separate religions, are taught to remain united at all times. Chhote Babu, who wants to marry Vidya, the girl who is engaged to Zamindari Ma's biological son Shankar, sows discord and hatred, causing great enmity between the trio until reason prevails and they reunite.

== Cast ==
- Durga Khote as Zamindari Ma
- Kamla Kotnis as Vidya
- Dev Anand as Shankar
- Rehana
- Rehman as Yusuf
- Ranjitkumari as Durga
- Rane.R.V. as John
- Baby Achrekar
- Ramsing as Chhote Babu
- Gokhale
- Ganpatrao
- Manajirao
- Bhagwat
- Karadkar
- Baby Sarpotdar
- Master Sharad Kulkarni
- Master Afzul Khan
- Abdul Hamid
- Master Tazmul Hussain
- Shaikh Buranuddin
- Cuckoo as a dancer

== Production ==
Hum Ek Hain, which was produced under Prabhat Film Company, was the directorial debut of P. L. Santoshi, and the acting debut of Dev Anand, Kamala Kotnis, Rehana and Rehman in cinema. Santoshi also worked as writer alongside Saleh Mohammed Qureshi and Tony Lazarus. Cinematography was handled by Surendra Pai. Guru Dutt worked as an assistant director and choreographer.

== Themes ==
Hum Ek Hain focuses on the idea of religious harmony in India, particularly Hindu–Muslim unity.

== Soundtrack ==
The soundtrack was composed by the duo Husnlal Bhagatram, while all songs were written by P. L. Santoshi.

No.	Title	Singer(s)	Length
1.	"Nadiya Kinare Mora Gaon Re"	Manik Varma	3:05
2.	"Sapnon Mein Aanewale"	Zohrabai Ambalewali	2:08
3.	"Meri Aai Hai Teen Bhabhiyan"	Amirbai Karnataki, Zohrabai Ambalewali	3:25

== Release and reception ==
Hum Ek Hain was released on 8 June 1946. Filmindia, a magazine which was then revered and feared by the Indian film industry, wrote positively about the film: "It has a theme with a purpose [...] that ought to find a response in the hearts of millions in our country." The reviewer also praised Anand's acting skills.

== Bibliography ==
- Chowdhury, Alpana (2004). Dev Anand: dashing, debonair. Rupa & Co. ISBN 9788129105431. OCLC 769537751.
- Rajadhyaksha, Ashish; Willemen, Paul (1998) [1994]. Encyclopaedia of Indian Cinema (PDF). British Film Institute and Oxford University Press. ISBN 0-19-563579-5.
