= C. Ramchandra =

Indian music director (1918–1982)

- Ramchandra in 1949
- Born: Ramchandra Narhar Chitalkar; 12 January 1918; Puntamba, Ahmednagar district, Bombay Presidency, British India
- Died: 5 January 1982 (aged 63); Mumbai, Maharashtra, India
- Other names: C. Ramchandra, Chitalkar, Anna Sahib
- Occupations: Film music composer, Film producer
- Years active: 1935–1971

Ramchandra Narhar Chitalkar (12 January 1918 – 5 January 1982), also known as C. Ramchandra or Chitalkar or Anna Sahib, was an Indian music director and playback singer.

As a composer, he mostly used the name C. Ramchandra, though he also used the names Annasaheb (in the movies Bahadur Pratap, Matwale, and Madadgaar), Ram Chitalkar (in the movies Sukhi Jeevan, Badla, Mr. Jhatpat, Bahadur, and Dosti), and Shyamoo (in the movie Yeh hai duniya). Further, he often sang and acted in Marathi movies under the name R. N. Chitalkar. For his career as an occasional playback singer he used only his surname Chitalkar. Chitalkar sang some renowned and unforgettable duets with Lata Mangeshkar such as "Kitna Haseen Hai Mausam" in the film Azaad (1955) and "Shola Jo Bhadke" in Albela (1951).

== Biography ==
Ramchandra Narhar Chitalkar was born on 12 January 1918 in Puntamba, a small town in Ahmednagar district in Maharashtra, India. He studied music under Vinayakbua Patwardhan at "Gandharva Mahavidyalaya" and also under Shankarrao Sapre of Nagpur where he studied music alongside Vasantrao Deshpande. He joined the movie industry playing the lead role in Y. V. Rao's movie, Naganand. He also had some small roles at Minerva Movietone in the movies Said-e-Havas (1936) and Atma Tarang (1937).

Ramchandra provided harmonium accompaniment for Minerva composers Bundu Khan and Habib Khan. He debuted as music director in Tamil movies with Jayakkodi and Vana Mohini. He received public notice as a good composer in Bhagwan Dada's Sukhi Jeevan (1942), and established a long association that culminated with the musical box office hit Albela (1951).

Influenced by Benny Goodman, Ramchandra introduced in his compositions the alto sax in combination with guitar and harmonica. He also included whistling in one of his famous songs, Aana meri jaan Sunday ke Sunday in film Shehnai (1947). He used a combination of a bongo, an oboe, a trumpet, a clarinet and a sax for the song Shola Jo Bhadke in film Albela. He sang the title song "Shin Shinaki Boobla Boo" of the eponymous film with Lata Mangeshkar, which included rock rhythms. He provided the musical score for the scat song "Ina mina dika" in Aasha (1957).

Perhaps C. Ramchandra's biggest success as a music composer was the 1953 movie Anarkali starring Beena Roy in the title role and Pradeep Kumar. The songs that he composed for this movie are today legendary. Songs of this movie like "Yeh Zindagi Usiki Hai", "Mujhse Mat Poochh Mere Ishq Main Kya Rakha Hai", "Mohabbat Aisi Dhadkan Hai", "Jaag Dard-E-Ishq Jaag" etc. went on to become huge hits and were highly acclaimed. Anarkali also perhaps saw the famed composer-singer combination of Ramchandra and Lata Mangeshkar at their best ever together. A film critic in London who watched the movie is said to have remarked that the heroine sang like an angel without knowing that the angel was actually Lata giving playback for the actress. Similarly, C. Ramchandra's compositions in V. Shantaram's Navrang (1959) and Stree (1961) were also quite popular and are still remembered.

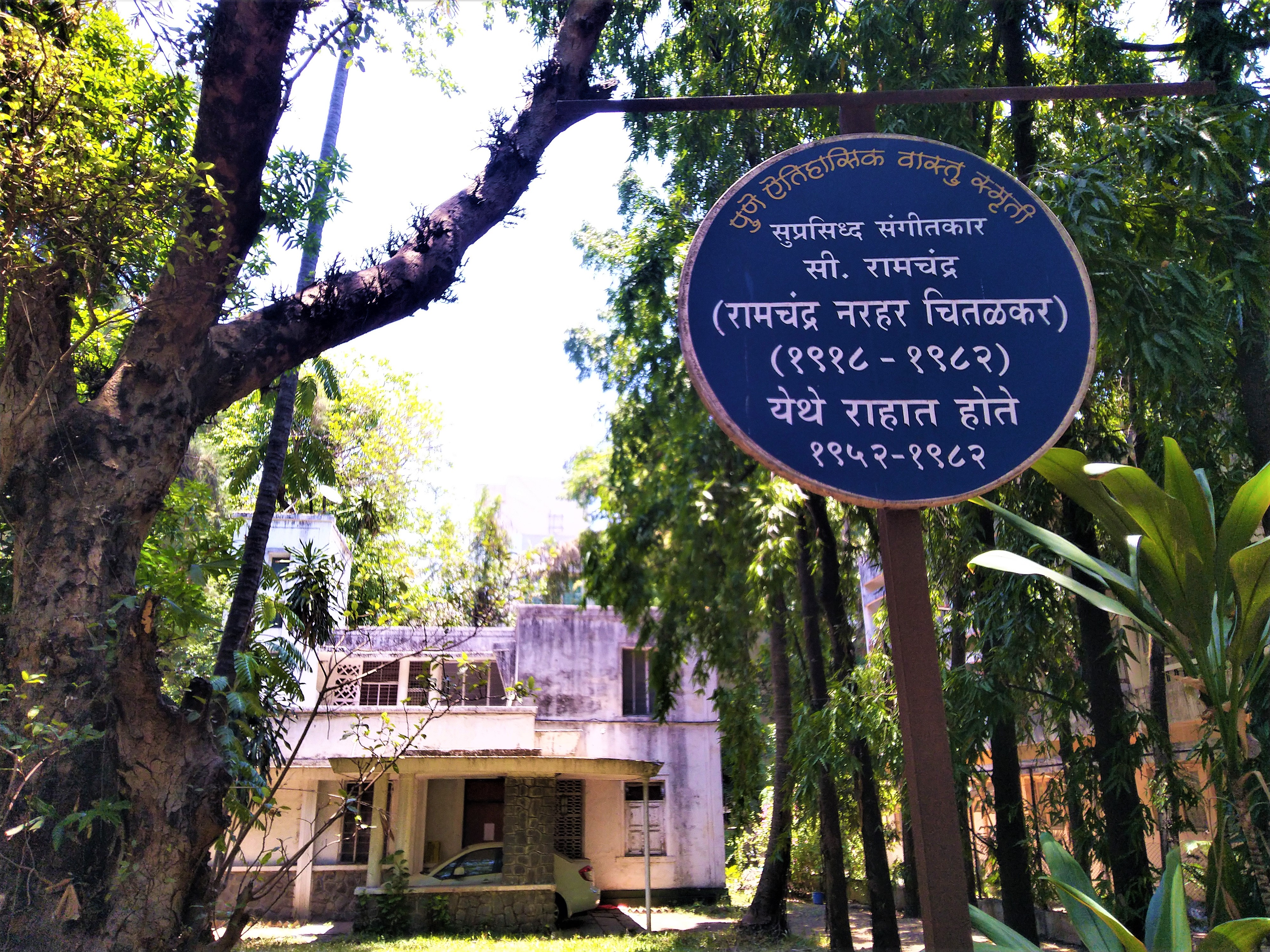
Former residence and blue plaque of Ramchandra in Pune

The highly popular patriotic song "Aye Mere Watan Ke Logon", which was sung by Lata Mangeshkar and penned by poet Pradeep, was a composition of Ramchandra. It was later performed live, by Lata Mangeshkar, in the presence of Jawaharlal Nehru at the National Stadium, in New Delhi on Republic Day in 1963. It is said Jawaharlal Nehru became so sentimental that tears rolled down his cheeks. On 27 January 2014, Lata Mangeshkar was felicitated by the then chief minister of Gujarat, Narendra Modi at Mumbai to commemorate the 51st anniversary of this song.

Ramchandra similarly provided a memorable musical score accompanying a competition between two dancers whose roles were played by Padmini and Vyjayanthimala for the song Kannum Kannum Kalanthu lyrics penned by Kothamangalam Subbu, sung by P. Leela and Jikki in the Tamil movie Vanjikottai Valiban (1958). He remade the song in Hindi as "Aaja Tu Raja Aaja" from Raj Tilak (1958) written by P. L. Santoshi where Asha Bhosle and Sudha Malhotra rendered their voice.

Ramchandra provided music compositions for a few Marathi, Telugu, Tamil, and Bhojpuri movies besides Hindi movies. He also produced three Hindi movies with New Sai Productions namely Jhanjhar (1953), Lehren (1953), Duniya Gol Hai (1955).

In the late 1960s, Ramchandra produced two Marathi movies, Dhananjay (1966) and Gharkul (1970). Apart from composing music, he also acted in them. Ramchandra wrote his autobiography The Symphony of My Life (माझ्या जीवनाची सरगम in Marathi) in 1977.

== Death ==
C. Ramchandra died on 5 January 1982, at age 63, in Mumbai, India.

== Awards and recognition ==
Ramachandra was nominated for 'Best Music Director' twice for Filmfare Awards for the films Azaad (1955) and Aasha (1957).

== Popular songs ==
Though Ramchandra used a number of ragas in his compositions, his favourite remained raga "Bageshri" (Radha na bole - Azad, 1955). In a 1978 interview at BBC studios with Mahendra Kaul, he ascribed the reason to Bageshri's simplicity. However, he also composed songs in other ragas including Malkauns (Aadha hai chandrama raat aadhi- Navrang).

The following is a short list of some of Ramchandra's best compositions:

- Yeh Zindagi Usi Ki Hai (Anarkali)
- Ae Mere Watan Ke Logo
- Dheere Se Aaja Ri Ankhiyan Mein (Albela)
- Bholi soorat dilke khote, naam bade aur darshan chhote (Albela)
- Mere dilki ghadi karen tiktiktik O baje raatke baaraa (Albela)
- Katatay hain dukh mein yeh din (Parchhaain)
- Tum kya jaano, tumhari yaad mein (Shin Shinaki Boobla Boo)
- Aankhon mein sama jao is dil mein raha karana (Yasmin)
- Kitna haseen hai mausam (Azaad)
- Shola Jo Bhadke, Dil Mera Dhadke (Albela) (1951)
- Mohabbat Hi Na Jo Samjhe, Woh Zalim Pyar Kya Jane (Parchhain) (1952)
- Ina Meena Dika (Aasha)
- Qismat Ki Hawa Kabhi Naram (Albela)
- Chhed Sakhi Sargam (Sargam)
- Koi kisi ka deewaana na bane (Sargam)
- Jaag dard-e-ishq jaag (Anarkali)
- Mehfil mein jal uthi shama (Nirala)
- Aye pyar teri duniya se hum (Jhanjar)
- Wafaaon ka majboor daman bichha kar dua kar gume dil khuda se dua kar (Anarkali)
- Muhobbat aisi dhadkan hai jo samjhayi nahi jati (Anarkali)
- Main jagu sari rain (Bahu Rani)
- Ab woh raate kahan ab woh baate kahan (Yasmin)
- Kannum Kannum Kalanthu (Vanjikottai Valiban) (Tamil film)
- Jo mujhe bhula ke chale gaye (Sangeeta)
- Mujh se mat poochh mere ishq mein kya rakha hai (Anarkali)
- Dekho ji bahar aayi (Azad)
- Jo dil ko jalaye sataye dukhaye aisi muhobbat se hum baaz aaye (Nirala)
- Mujh pe ilzaam-e-bewafaai hai (Yasmin)
- Aye chand pyar mera tujh se ye kah raha hai (Khazana)
- Muhobbat mein aise zamane bhi aaye (Sagai)
- Aa ja ab to aa ja (Anarkali)
- Tere dar se khushi mangi magar gum de diya tu ne (Hungama)
- Tere phoolon se bhi pyar (Nastik)
- Kali kali ratiyan yaad sataye (Ghungaroo)
- O nirdayi pritam (Stree)
- Balma bada nadan (Albela)
- Dil se bhula do tum humen (Patanga)
- Sipayee O Sipayee (Akbar Salim Anarkali) (Telugu film)
- Kaghaz ki thi woh nao jis main ham jarahe the (Zaban)
- Dil ki duniya basa ke sawariyan (Amardeep)
- Jab Dil Ko Sataave Gham, Chhed Sakhi Sargam (Sargam) (1950)
- Dekh Tere Sansaar Ki Haalat Kya Ho Gai Bhagwan (Nastik) (1954)
- Naa Bole Naa Bole Naa Bole Re (Azad)
- Aplam chaplam chaplai re
- Mere man ka baanvra panchhi kyon baar baar dole
- Dekh hamen awaaz na dena (Amardeep)
- Aapka chehra mashalla (Rootha Na Karo)
- Bechain Nazar Betaab Jigar (Yasmin)
- Kehte Hai pyar kisko panchi jara bata de (Baarish)
- Kitna Badal Gaya Insaan (Nastik)

C Ramchandra composed music for some Marathi songs, which are liked as well.

- Malamali Tarunya Maze – Gharkul (1970) Singer – Asha Bhosle / Lyrics – Suresh Bhat
- Pachole Amhi Ho Pachole – Singer Chitalkar / Lyrics – Anna Joshi

{The tune was later reused in Damini (1993) as ‘Gawah Hai Chand Taare’ by Nadeem Shravan}

- Achandrasurya Nando Swatantrya Bharatache – Gharkul (1970) / Singer – Rani Verma & Chorus, Lyrics – Ga Di Madgulkar Gajanan Digambar Madgulkar
- House of Bamboo – Gharkul (1970) Singers – Manna Dey, Pramila Datar and Chorus / Lyrics – Shanta Shelke
- Aai Bagh Na Kasa Ha Dada – Balgeet/Song for kids (1972) / Singer – Sushma Shrestha, Lyrics – Shanta Shelke
- Roop Pahta Lochani – Sant Nivrutti Dnyandev (1964) / Singer – Asha Bhosle, Lyrics – Sant Dnyaneshwar

== Filmography ==
Movies for which Ramchandra provided musical scores are listed below in alphabetical order:

1. Aanchal (1960)
2. Azaad (1955)
3. Ahinsa (1947)
4. Albela (1951)
5. Amar Rahe Yeh Pyar (1961)
6. Amar Deep (1958)
7. Anarkali (1953)
8. Aasha (1957)
9. Akbar Salim Anarkali (1979)
10. Baarish (1957)
11. Bachchon Ka Khel (1946)
12. Badla (1943)
13. Bahadur (1944)
14. Bahadur Pratap (1947)
15. Bahurani (1963)
16. Balram Shri Krishna (1968)
17. Bhakt Raj (1943)
18. Chhatrapati Shivaji (1952)
19. Daal Me Kaala (1964)
20. Devta (1956)
21. Dil Ki Baat (1944)
22. Dosti (1946)
23. Duniya (1949)
24. Duniya Gol Hai (1955)
25. Ghungroo (1952)
26. Girls School (1949), with Anil Biswas
27. Hanso Hanso Ae Duniya Walo (1942)
28. Hum Diwane (1965)
29. Hungama (1952)
30. Insaniyat (1955)
31. Jhaanjhar (1953)
32. Jhamela (1953)
33. Jitne Door Utne Paas (1960) (Unreleased)
34. Kaarigar (1965)
35. Kavi (1954)
36. Khazana (1951)
37. Khidki (1948)
38. Labelaa (1966)
39. Lahren (1953)
40. Lalkar (1944)
41. Leela (1947)
42. Lutera (1955)
43. Madadgaar (1947)
44. Madam Zapata (1962)
45. Manorama (1944)
46. Matwale (1947)
47. Meenar (1954)
48. Mera Munna (1948)
49. Mr. Jhatpat (1943)
50. Muskurahat (1943)
51. Nastik (1954)
52. Nadiya Ke Par (1948)
53. Nagma-e-Sahra (1945)
54. Namoona (1949)
55. Nausherwan-E-Adil (1957)
56. Navrang (1959)
57. Nazrana (1948) (Unreleased)
58. Nirala (1950)
59. Payal Ki Jhankar (1968)
60. Paigham (1959)
61. Parchhain (1952)
62. Patanga (1949)
63. Pehli Jhalak (1954)
64. Raj Tilak (1958)
65. Raunaq 1944
66. Rootha Na Karo (1970)
67. Roshni (1949)
68. Sajan (1947)
69. Sanwaria (1949)
70. Saqi (1952)
71. Savdhan (1954)
72. Sawan (1945)
73. Safar (1946)
74. Sagai (1951)
75. Samadhi (1950)
76. Samrat Chandragupt (1945)
77. Sangeeta (1950)
78. Sangram (1950)
79. Sargam (1950)
80. Sarhad (1960)
81. Saudagar (1951), with Hanuman Prasad
82. Shabistan (1951)
83. Shadi Se Pehle (1947)
84. Shagufa (1953)
85. Sharada (1957)
86. Shatranj (1956)
87. Shehnai (1947)
88. Sher Dil (1965)
89. Shin Shinaki Boobla Boo (1952)
90. Sipahiya (1949)
91. Stree (1961)
92. Subah Ka Tara (1954)
93. Sukhi Jivan (1942)
94. Talaq (1958)
95. Talash (1957)
96. Tasveer (1966)
97. Teerandaz (1955)
98. Toofani Takkar (1978)
99. Tulsi Vivah (1971)
100. Ustad Pedro (1951)
101. Vana Mohini (1941)
102. Veer Bhimsen (1964)
103. Wahan Ke Log (1967)
104. Yasmin (1955)
105. Zaban (1943)
106. Zindagi Aur Maut (1965)
