= Rehana (actress) =

Pakistani and Indian actress (1931–2013)

- ریحانہ
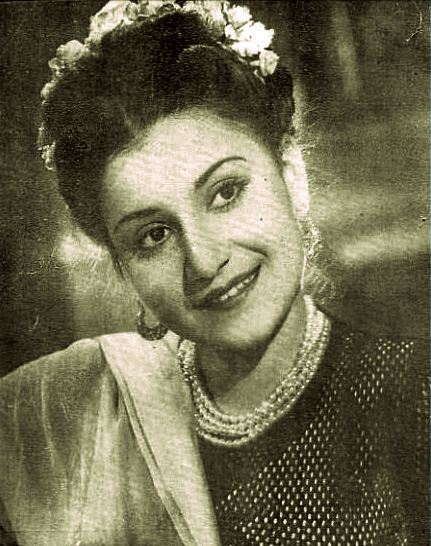
- Rehana in Adaa (1951)
- Born: Rehana Anjuman Choudhary; 10 March 1931; Bombay, Bombay Presidency, British India
- Died: 23 April 2013 (aged 82); Karachi, Sindh, Pakistan
- Other names: The Queen of Charm; The Dancing Damsel of Bombay
- Occupation: Actress
- Years active: 1936 – 1995
- Spouses: Sabir Ahmed; Iqbal Shehzad (divorced)
- Children: 3

Rehana Anjuman Choudhary (10 March 1931 – 23 April 2013), known professionally as Rehana, was a film actress who predominantly worked in Indian and Pakistani cinema.

She was known as both "The Queen of Charm" and "The Dancing Damsel of Bombay". She worked in leading roles in films such as Sagai, Tadbir, Hum Ek Hain, Shehnai, Sajan, Samrat and Sargam in India before migrating to Pakistan in the mid-1950s.

== Early life ==
Rehana was born as Rehana Anjuman Choudhary in Bombay, British India. Rehana's father was a manufacturer of Moradabadi silverware and owned a factory in Lucknow. Rehana liked arts and started learning classical dance when she was a child. Later, during a stage dance, she was noticed by Shambhu Maharaj.

At age five, she was trained in Kathak dance by Shambhu Maharaj and he was friends with Kajjanbai. So he introduced Rehana to her. Later, he would take Rehana with him to Kajjanbai's touring company at Lucknow where he trained Rehana for rehearsals. Later Rehana did a classical dance at Kajjanbai's house at the request of a friend. It made Kajjanbai so impressed that she immediately took Rehana to her company and trained her in acting.

Then she became a member of her troupe and would travel to different countries for performance and musical stage plays. Later, when she returned to India then she signed a contract with Entertainments National Service Association which was opened by Basil Dean and Leslie Henson and she made her debut in film Tadbir.

== Career ==
After doing dancing roles and small roles in films like the K. L. Saigal-Suraiya-starrer Tadbir, she got her major break in Hum Ek Hain (1946), which was incidentally Dev Anand's first film. Sajan (1947) had Rehana in the female lead, and following the success of this film, as well as Shehnai (1947), she became an "overnight star".

From 1948 to 1951 was the best phase of her career as she did a variety of films paired opposite most of the top heroes of that time, like Prem Adib in Actress (1948), with Raj Kapoor in Sunehre Din (1949) and Sargam (1950), with Dev Anand in Dilruba (1950), with Shyam in Nirdosh (1950) and Surajmukhi (1950), with Shekhar in Adaa (1951) and with Premnath in Sagai (1951). Two of her biggest hits from these were Sargam (1950) and Sagai (1951).

After 1952, her career sharply went on the decline as films like Rangeeli (1952), Chham Chhama Chham (1952), Hazar Raatein (1953) and Samrat (1954) all sank at the box office. With her career on the decline in India, Rehana migrated to Pakistan with the hope of continuing her career there.

In Pakistan, she worked in Urdu films like Raat ke Rahi, Wehshi, Apna Praya, Shalimar, Aulad and Dil Ne Tujhe Man Liya. She successfully worked in many films which revived her acting career and performed a number of character roles in films such Insan Badalta Hai, Shabab, Unchay Mahal, Miss 56 and Heer Ranjha. In 1995 she was a judge for the Nigar Awards.

== Personal life ==
Rehana married producer Iqbal Shehzad who she worked with in the film Raat Ke Rahi but later they divorced and then she married a businessman Sabir Ahmed, a businessman from Karachi. With him she had three children.

== Death ==
She died in Karachi on 23 April 2013.

== Controversies ==
She is regarded as Hindi cinema's first "Jhatka Queen". Her movie Shin Shinaki Boobla Boo (1952) became the first film to be banned by the Ministry of Information and Broadcasting because of its low moral tone, even when it was certified for unrestricted public viewing by the censor board of India. Immense public support for the actress made the information and broadcasting ministry of the central government bow down and allow the unrestricted release of the film, but the huge delay reduced its success at the box office.

In 2010, Rehana's family filed a case against film producer Ekta Kapoor and director Milan Luthria, at the Allahabad High Court . According to a legal notice, the filmmaker had used the name 'Rehana' without their consent in the film Once Upon A Time in Mumbaai and had maligned her image.

== Filmography ==
=== Film ===
Year	Film	Language
1945	Tadbir	Hindi
1946	Hum Ek Hain	Hindi
1946	Amar Raj	Hindi
1947	Sajan	Hindi
1947	Sati Toral	Hindi
1947	Nateeja	Hindi
1947	Shehnai	Hindi
1947	Nai Baat	Hindi
1947	Pul	Hindi
1948	Actress	Hindi
1948	Khidki	Hindi
1949	Sunehre Din	Hindi
1949	Parda	Hindi
1949	Chilman	Hindi
1949	Roshini	Hindi
1949	Jannat	Hindi
1950	Nirdosh	Hindi
1950	Bijli	Hindi
1950	Surajmukhi	Hindi
1950	Dilruba	Hindi
1950	Lajawab	Hindi
1950	Sargam	Hindi
1951	Adaa	Hindi
1951	Sagai	Hindi
1951	Saudagar	Hindi
1952	Rangeeli	Hindi
1952	Chham Chhama Chham	Hindi
1952	Shin Shinaki Boobla Boo	Hindi
1953	Hazar Raatein	Hindi
1954	Samrat	Hindi
1955	Ratna Manjari	Hindi
1956	Delhi Durbar	Hindi
1956	Dhola Maru	Hindi
1956	Miss 56	Urdu
1956	Qeemat	Hindi
1956	Wehshi	Urdu
1956	Shalimar	Urdu
1957	Mehfil	Hindi
1959	Savera	Urdu
1959	Apna Praya	Urdu
1960	Raat Ke Rahi	Urdu
1960	Ankh Aur Khoon	Urdu
1960	Sahil	Urdu
1961	Insan Badalta Hai	Urdu
1961	Zabak	Hindi
1962	Aulad	Urdu
1962	Unchay Mahal	Urdu
1963	Hamrahi	Hindi
1963	Dil Ne Tujhe Man Liya	Urdu
1963	Kan Kan Men Bhagwan	Hindi
1963	Dulhan	Urdu
1964	Chitralekha	Hindi
1964	Roop Sundari	Hindi
1964	Shabab	Urdu
1965	Yeh Jahan Walay	Urdu
1966	Teesri Kasam	Hindi
1968	Shehanshah-e-Jahangir	Urdu
1968	Aadhi Raat	Urdu
1968	Dil Diya Dard Liya	Urdu
1969	Zindagi Kitni Haseen Hay	Urdu
1970	Shahi Faqeer	Urdu
1970	Love in Jungle	Urdu
1970	Bazi	Urdu
1970	Heer Ranjha	Urdu
1971	Night Club	Urdu
1971	Bazigar	Punjabi
1972	Koshish	Hindi
1974	Majboor	Hindi
1974	Khote Sikkay	Hindi
1976	Pyar Kaday Nein Marda	Punjabi
1977	Aina	Urdu
1983	Desh Shatru	Hindi
1983	Betaab	Hindi
