= Madan Mohan (composer) =

Indian composer and singer (1924–1975)

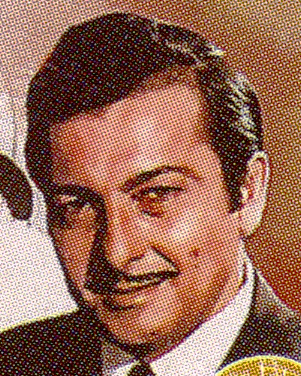
- Born: Madan Mohan Kohli; 25 June 1924; Baghdad, Mandatory Iraq (present-day Iraq)
- Died: 14 July 1975 (aged 51); Bombay, Maharashtra, India
- Occupations: Music director, singer
- Years active: 1950–1975
- Children: 2
- Relatives: Anju Mahendru (niece)
- Awards: 1971: National Film Award for Best Music Direction – Dastak
- Website: Official website

Madan Mohan Kohli (25 June 1924 – 14 July 1975), better known as Madan Mohan, was an Indian music director of the 1950s, 1960s and the 1970s. He is considered one of the most melodious and skilled music directors of the Hindi film industry. He is particularly remembered for the immortal ghazals he composed for Hindi films. Some of his best works are with singers Lata Mangeshkar, Mohammed Rafi and Talat Mahmood, the three singers he worked with frequently, for most of his career.

== Early years ==
Born on 25 June 1924, at Baghdad where his father Rai Bahadur Chunilal Kohli was working as an Accountant General with the Iraqi Police forces, Madan Mohan spent the early years of his life in the Middle East. After 1932, his family returned to their home town of Chakwal, then in Jhelum district of Punjab, British India. He was left in the care of a grandparent while his father went to Bombay to seek business opportunities. He attended local school in Lahore for the next few years. During his stay at Lahore, he learnt the basics of classical music from one Kartar Singh for a very short period, however he never received any formal training in music. Some time later, his family moved to Mumbai where he completed his Senior Cambridge from St. Mary's School in Byculla Mumbai. In Mumbai, at the age of 11 years, he started performing in children's programmes broadcast by All India Radio. At age 17, he attended the Colonel Brown Cambridge School in Dehradun where he completed the last years of his schooling.

== Career ==
=== Early career ===
He joined the Army as a Second Lieutenant in the year 1943. He served there for two years until end of World War II, when he left the Army and returned to Mumbai to pursue his musical interests. In 1946, he joined the All India Radio, Lucknow as Programme Assistant, where he came in contact with various artists such as Ustad Faiyaz Khan, Ustad Ali Akbar Khan, Begum Akhtar, and Talat Mahmood. During these days he would also compose music for programmes to be broadcast on All India Radio. In 1947, he was transferred to All India Radio, Delhi where he worked for a short period. He was very fond of singing, and, in 1947, he got his first chance to record two ghazals penned by Behzad Lucknawi, "Aane Laga Hai Koi Nazar Jalwa Gar Mujhe" and "Is Raaz Ko Duniya Jaanti Hai". Soon after, in 1948 he recorded two more private ghazals penned by Deewan Sharar, "Wo Aaye To Mahfil Mein Ithlaate Huye Aaye" and "Duniya Mujhe Kahti Hai Ke Main Tujhko Bhoolaa Doon". In 1948, he got his first opportunity to sing a film duet "Pinjare Mein Bulbul Bole" and "Mera Chhotasa Dil Dole" with Lata Mangeshkar under composer Ghulam Haider for the film Shaheed, though these songs were never released or used in the film. Between 1946 and 1948, he assisted music composers S.D. Burman for Do Bhai, and Shyam Sundar in Actress.

=== 1950s: Breakthrough ===
Mohan scored his first big break with the film Aankhen in 1950, working with Mukesh and Shamshad Begum, which also marked the beginning of a long series of collaborations with Mohammed Rafi. His next film was Ada (1951), which commenced another string of collaborations with Lata Mangeshkar, as both would go on to sing for many of his films. Mohan also worked with Kishore Kumar on the film. Two of his composed songs for Sharabi; "Sawan Ke Maheeney Mein" and "Kabhi Na Kabhi Koi", both filmed for Dev Anand, are among the most well known renditions of Mohammed Rafi.

Madan Mohan worked with Hemant Kumar as well, with his first time working with Kumar being for the film Dhoon (1953). Hemant Kumar sang "Hum Pyar Karenge" with Lata Mangeshkar. Madan Mohan again worked with Hemant Kumar for the film Mohar (1959), on a song called "Kho Gaye Jane Kahan". Mohan also worked with Kishore Kumar on the songs such as "Simti Si, Sharmai Si" from Parwana, "Zaroorat Hai, Zaroorat Hai" from Manmauji, the title song from Ek Muthi Aasman, "Mera Naam Abdul Rehman" from Bhai Bhai, and "Aai Hasino, Naazanino" from Chacha Zindabad. Mohan's last composition before his death was also sung by Kishore Kumar, for the song "Rahi Tha Main Aawara" from film Saheb Bahadur (1977). As a music director, he worked with Mahendra Kapoor for the first time in Jailor (1958). Madan often collaborated with lyricists Raja Mehdi Ali Khan, Kaifi Azmi, and Rajinder Krishan, Sahir Ludhianvi and Majrooh Sultanpuri for his compositions.

In 1957, he composed the soundtrack of the film Dekh Kabira Roya, in which the legendary singer Manna Dey gave his voice to the melodious "Kaun Aaya Mere Man Ke Dwaare". In addition to that, he had Lata Mangeshkar sing "Tu Pyaar Kare Ya Thukraaye" and "Meri Veena Tum Bin Roye", while Talat Mahmood sung the song "Hum Se Aaya Na Gaya". Once, in an interview, Manna Dey recalled that Madan Mohan asked him to take special care while he was recording "Kaun Aaya Mere Man Ke Dwaare".

=== 1960s-1970s: Established composer and debut as a lyricist ===
Madan also acted as a lyricist for male singers such as Talat Mahmood, for the songs "Phir Wahi Shaam", "Main Teri Nazar Ka Suroor Hoon" and "Teri Aankh Ke Aansoo" from Jahan Ara (1964), while also acting as a composer for the soundtrack. He also wrote several songs that were later sung by Mohammed Rafi, including "Ek Haseen Shaam Ko" from Dulhan Ek Raat Ki, "Kisi Ki Yaad Mein" from Jahan Ara, "Main Nigahen Tere Chehere Se" from Aap Ki Parchaiyian, and "Tere Dar Pe Aayaa Hoon" from Laila-Majnu, among others. Suman Kalyanpur worked with Madan Mohan on several popular soundtracks. In 1964, she recorded two duets with Mohammed Rafi: "Mujhe Yeh Phool Na De" for the film Gazal and "Baad Muddat Ke Yeh Ghadi Aayi" for Jahan Ara. In 1965, she sang the duet "Tere Pyar Ka Main Diwana" with Mahendra Kapoor for the film Bombay Race Course.

He would also go on to compose "Wo Chup Rahen To" from the film Jahan Ara (1964) and "Maine Rang Li Aaj Chunariya" from Dulhan Ek Raat Ki (1966) for Mohammed Rafi.

Madan also composed the score for Chetan Anand's Haqeeqat (1964), a film based on the Sino-Indian War of 1962, starring Balraj Sahni and Dharmendra. He collaborated with Rafi, who sang numbers like "Kar Chale Hum Fida" and "Main Yeh Soch Kar Uske Dar Se Utha.” Mangeshkar was roped in for the song "Zara Si Aahat Hoti Hai" and the unreleased "Khelo Na Mere Dilse". The film also saw Rafi, Talat, Manna Dey, and Bhupendra singing "Hoke Majboor Mujhe Usne Bhulaya Hoga". Bhupendra appeared on the screen as well for the first time, much before he established himself as a playback singer. This song is also the only song in which four male playback singers contributed their voices together in a song. In 1966, he again paired with Lata Mangeshkar for Mera Saaya.

Madan Mohan's next venture was Raj Khosla's version of The Woman in White, titled Woh Kaun Thi?. The film's soundtrack featured three solo performances by Mangeshkar, namely "Naina Barse Rim Jhim", "Lag Jaa Gale", and "Jo Humne Daastaan Apni Sunayi" and a duet.

The late fifties, sixties and the early seventies were the most productive period in Madan Mohan's career. His songs from those decades include compositions for films like Adalat, Anpadh, Dulhan Ek Raat Ki, Mera Saya, Dastak, Hanste Zakhm, Heer Raanjha, Maharaja, and Mausam, among many others. His penultimate effort was for a film released five years after his death, Chalbaaz. In 1970, during the changing times of western music, he gave music based on ragas for Rajinder Singh Bedi's Dastak and won his only 1971 National Film Award for Best Music Direction. The songs sung by Lata Mangeshkar for the film are still considered her finest.

In the 1970s, Madan Mohan composed multiple hit numbers with Mohammed Rafi, including “Hoke Mayus Tere Dar Se”, “Tere Dar Pe Aaya Hu”, and “Barbad-e-Mohabbat” for Laila Majnu, as well as “Yeh Duniya Yeh Mehfil” and “Tere Koche Mein Tera Diwana” for Heer Raanjha.

He also composed the song "Tum Bin Jeevan Kaisa Jeevan" in the film Bawarchi.

He also composed for the movie Dil Ki Rahen, which contained songs like "Rasm-e-Ulfat Ko". The lyricist for the ghazal was Naqsh Lallayalpuri and it was sung by Lata Mangeshkar. It is considered one of the best songs sung by Lata Mangeshkar.

Madan Mohan's son, Sanjeev Kohli, recreated 11 of his late father's unused compositions for the soundtrack of the 2004 Yash Chopra film Veer-Zaara. The soundtrack became a blockbuster hit and introduced Madan Mohan's compositions to a new generation of listeners. Lata Mangeshkar, who sang the majority of the songs, said the horoscope of some people opens up after they are gone, in reference to the posthumous recognition Mohan received through the film. New lyrics for the compositions were written by Javed Akhtar. Some of Madan Mohan's other unused compositions were later released on the album Tere Bagair, also compiled by Sanjeev Kohli.

=== Legacy ===
The 3 singers he mostly collaborated with, were Mohammed Rafi, Lata Mangeshkar, and Talat Mahmood who produced very popular songs even popular today. He also collaborated with singers like Kishore Kumar, Mukesh, Hemant Kumar, Mahendra Kapoor, Asha Bhosle, Shamshad Begum, Geeta Dutt, Suman Kalyanpur, and other singers, but he did not work with these singers as much.

Lata Mangeshkar christened him as "Ghazal ka Shehzadaa" (Prince of Ghazals). Lata herself stated in a live concert in the late 1990s that she found Madan Mohan's compositions difficult to master. Most of the top film actors of the day (who were also studio heads) had fallen into a groove with their preferred composers (e.g., Raj Kapoor had Shankar Jaikishan, Dev Anand had the Burmans, Dilip Kumar had Naushad, etc.). Hence, he often had difficulty finding assignments. He was nominated for the 1964 Filmfare Award for Best Music Director for Woh Kaun Thi. In a tightly contested race, both Madan and Shankar Jaikishan (Sangam) lost to the relative newcomer duo Laxmikant-Pyarelal, who scored Dosti.

== Discography ==
Year	Film	Songs	Role
1950	Aankhen	"Preet Laga Ke Maine Yeh Phal Paaya"	Composer
1952	Baap Re Baap	"Main Tere Dwar Khada"	Composer
1955	Railway Platform	"Basti Basti Parbat Parbat"	Composer
1958	Adalat	"Yun Hasraton Ke Daag"	Composer
1964	Woh Kaun Thi?	"Lag Jaa Gale," "Naina Barse Rim Jhim"	Composer
1966	Mera Saaya	"Tu Jahan Jahan Chalega"	Composer
1970	Dastak	"Mai Ri Main Kase Kahoon"	Composer
1975	Mausam	"Dil Dhoondta Hai"	Composer

== Death and legacy ==
Madan's constant struggles took a toll on his life, and he began drinking heavily. He died of liver cirrhosis on 14 July 1975. His body was lifted before his funeral by actors Rajesh Khanna, Dharmendra, Amitabh Bachchan and Rajendra Kumar.

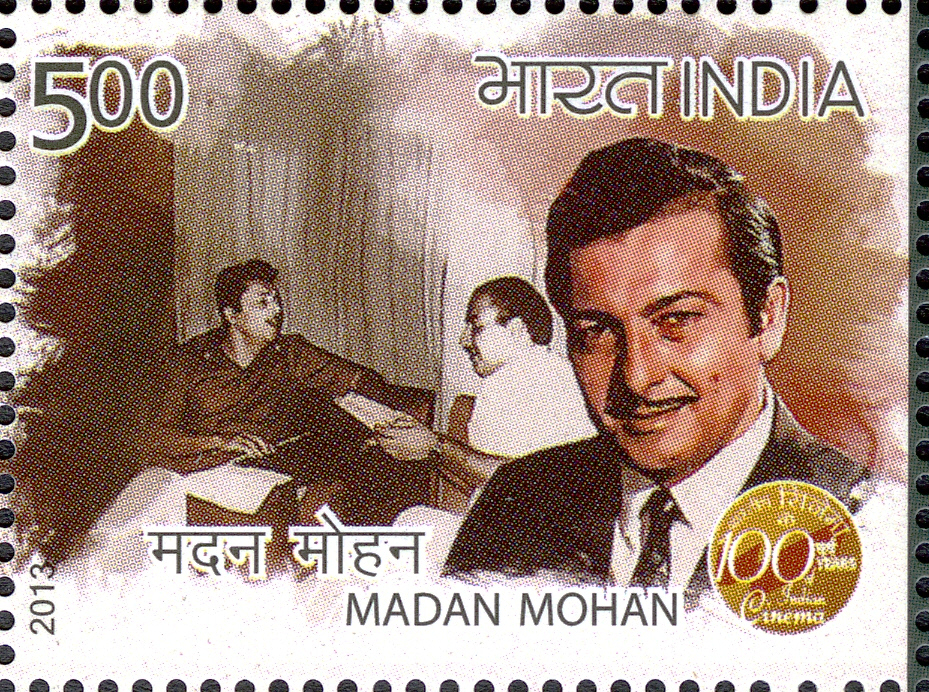
Madan Mohan on 2013 stamp of India

In 2004, Madan's unused tunes were recreated by his son, Sanjeev Kohli, for the Yash Chopra film Veer-Zaara, starring Shah Rukh Khan, Preity Zinta, and Rani Mukerji. The lyrics were written by Javed Akhtar, and Lata Mangeshkar was invited to once again to sing the majority of the melodies composed by him. The music was highly appreciated and was critically acclaimed. He was posthumously awarded the IIFA Award for Best Music Director in 2005, for Veer-Zaara.

In 2023, Pritam composed the song titled "What Jhumka?" from the film Rocky Aur Rani Kii Prem Kahaani, starring Ranveer Singh and Alia Bhatt, adapted from Madan's 1966 song "Jhumka Gira Re" from the film Mera Saaya, which was released on 12 July. The song featured Singh and Bhatt in the music video, and was sung by Arijit Singh, Jonita Gandhi, with the lyrics written by Amitabh Bhattacharya.

== Books on Madan Mohan ==
Madan Mohan: An Unforgettable Composer– Edited by V M Joshi & Suresh Rao, presents an analytical look at the composer's work. It includes articles by Sanjeev Kohli, Akshay Kohli, O P Dutta, Uttam Singh, B R Ishara, Dr. Ashok Ranade, Alka Deo Marulkar, Mridula Joshi, Dr. Kirti Shrivastava, Deepak Jeswal and many more; interviews with Lata Mangeshkar, Shreya Ghoshal, Mahalaxmi Iyer and Rehana Sultan, and Madan Mohan's filmography.

== Style ==
Madan's music was characterised by his immense ability to meld elements of Indian classical music into a new style of Hindi filmi song. He had a keen and sensitive ear for the nuances of Indian classical tunes, and combined them with elements of Western music such as harmonies to produce a style of music that could be appreciated by both classical music aficionados and the common person alike.

His compositions were notable for their precise ornamentation and extensive use of Indian ragas as melodic foundations. Songs such as Baiyyan Na Dharo from Dastak (1970) were composed in specific ragas, in that case Charukesi, while the film's closing ghazal was set in Bhairavi. The sitar, played in many of his films by renowned musician Raees Khan, was a recurring element of his arrangements, lending his filmi songs an authenticity rooted in Hindustani classical practice.

== Filmography ==
Year	Film title	Notes
1950	Aankhen	
1951	Adaa	
1951	Madhosh	
1952	Aashiana	
1952	Anjaam	
1952	Khoobsurat	
1952	Nirmohi	
1953	Baaghi	
1953	Chacha Choudhary	
1953	Dhoon	
1954	Ilzaam	
1954	Mastana	
1955	Ehsaan	
1955	Railway Platform	
1956	Bhai-Bhai	
1956	Fifty Fifty	
1956	Mem Sahib	
1956	Pocket Maar	
1957	Beti	
1957	Chhote Babu	
1957	Dekh Kabhira Roya	
1957	Gateway of India	
1957	Samundar	
1957	Sheroo	
1958	Aakhri Dao	
1958	Adalat	
1958	Chandan	
1958	Ek Shola	
1958	Jailor	
1958	Khazanchi	
1958	Khota Paisa	
1958	Night Club	
1959	Baap Bete	
1959	Bank Manager	
1959	Chacha Zindabaad	
1959	Duniya Na Maane	
1959	Jagir	
1959	Minister	
1959	Mohr	
1960	Bahana	
1961	Sanjog	
1961	Senapati	
1962	Anpadh	Nominated – Filmfare Award for Best Music Director
1962	Manmauji	
1963	Akeli Mat Jaiyo	
1964	Aap Ki Parchhaiyan	
1964	Gazal	
1964	Haqeeqat	
1964	Jahan Ara	
1964	Pooja Ke Phool	
1964	Sharabi	
1964	Suhagan	
1964	Woh Kaun Thi?	Nominated – Filmfare Award for Best Music Director
1965	Bombay Race Course	
1965	Naya Kanoon	
1965	Neela Aakash	
1965	Rishte Naate	
1966	Dak Ghar	
1966	Dulhan Ek Raat Ki	
1966	Ladka Ladki	
1966	Mera Saaya	
1966	Neend Hamari Khwab Tumhare	
1967	Ghar Ka Chirag	
1967	Jab Yaad Kisi Ki Aati Hai	
1967	Naunihal	
1967	Nawab Sirajuddaula	
1968	Ek Kali Muskaai	
1969	Chirag	
1970	Dastak	Won – National Film Award for Best Music Direction
1970	Heer Raanjha	
1970	Maa Ka Aanchal	
1970	Maharaja	
1971	Parwana	
1972	Bawarchi	
1972	Koshish	
1972	Sultana Daku	
1973	Ek Mutthi Aasmaan	
1973	Hanste Zakhm	
1973	Hindustan Ki Kasam	
1973	Prabhat	
1973	Dil Ki Rahen	
1974	Asliyat	
1974	Chowkidar	
1975	Mausam	Nominated – Filmfare Award for Best Music Director
1976	Laila Majnu	
1976	Sharafat Chod Di Maine	
1977	Saheb Bahadur	
1978	Jalan	
1979	Inspector Eagle	Posthumously released
1980	Chaal Baaz	Posthumously released
2004	Veer-Zaara	Posthumously released Nominated – Filmfare Award for Best Music Director Nominated – Producers Guild Film Awards for Best Music Director; Won IIFA Award for Best Music Director Won Bollywood Movie Awards for Best Music Director
2023	Rocky Aur Rani Kii Prem Kahaani	Posthumously released, co-composed with Pritam for song "What Jhumka?"

== See also ==
- List of Indian film music directors

== Bibliography ==
- Gulzar; Govind Nihalani; Saibal Chatterjee (2003). Encyclopaedia of Hindi Cinema. Popular Prakashan. ISBN 978-81-7991-066-5.
