= Hindustan Ki Kasam =

Hindustan Ki Kasam (lit. 'Oath of India' in Hindi) may refer to:

- Hindustan Ki Kasam (1973 film), an Indian war film
- Hindustan Ki Kasam (1999 film), an Indian action film by Veeru Devgan
