= Priya Rajvansh =

Indian movie actress (1936–2000)

- Born: Vera Sunder Singh; 30 December 1936; Simla, Punjab Province, British India (now Shimla, Himachal Pradesh, India)
- Died: 27 March 2000 (aged 63); Mumbai, Maharashtra, India
- Occupation: Actress
- Years active: 1964–1986
- Partner: Chetan Anand
- Family: Anand family

Priya Rajvansh (30 December 1936 – 27 March 2000), born Vera Sunder Singh, was an Indian actress, who is known for her performance in Hindi films like Heer Raanjha (1970) and Hanste Zakhm (1973), amongst a handful of films she did during her career.

== Early life and education ==
Priya Rajvansh was born as Veera Sunder Singh in Shimla. Her father, Sunder Singh, was an IFS officer who served as the Conservator of Forests in Himachal Pradesh. She grew up in Shimla along with her brothers, Kamaljit Singh (Gulu) and Padamjit Singh. She studied at Auckland House School, where she was school captain, and Convent of Jesus and Mary. She passed intermediate from St. Bede's College, Shimla in 1953, and joined Bhargava Municipal College (BMC), during this period, she acted in several English plays at Shimla's noted Gaiety Theatre.

Her father was on a UN assignment, so after graduation she joined the Royal Academy of Dramatic Art (RADA) in London, UK.

== Career ==
While still in London and 22 years old, one of her photographs, taken by a London photographer, somehow reached the Hindi film industry. A movie maker of that time, Ranveer Singh, belonging to a family of Kota learned of her. Singh had written and made popular British and Hollywood films starring Yul Bryner and Ursula Andress and was familiar with Peter O'Toole and Richard Burton. Ranveer Singh had also given the popular actor Ranjeet his first offer in a film called Zindagi ki Rahein (Roads of life) which he wanted to make.

Subsequently, Ranveer Singh brought her to meet Chetan Anand, (brother of Dev Anand and Vijay Anand) in 1962 and they cast her in one of their films, Haqeeqat (1964). The film became a hit and is often counted as among the best Indian war-films. Soon she was in a relationship with her mentor, Chetan Anand, who had just separated from his wife. Priya was many years younger to Chetan. Thereafter, she starred only in Chetan Anand films, in which she was involved in every aspect- starting from story to scripting, lyrics, and post-production. Chetan, too, never made a film without her as the central character. Despite being a highly talented actress, her anglicised accent and western femininity did not click well with the Indian audience.

Her next film, Heer Raanjha came out only in 1970, where she acted opposite the rage of that time, actor Raaj Kumar, and the film was a hit. Then came Hanste Zakhm, arguably the finest film of her career, in 1973. Her other noted films were Hindustan Ki Kasam (1973), with Raaj Kumar, and Kudrat (1981), paired opposite Rajesh Khanna, where she had a parallel role with Hema Malini as the lead. She also starred opposite Dev Anand in Saheb Bahadur in 1977. Her last film Haathon Ki Lakeeren was released in 1985, after which she ended her film career.

== Personal life ==
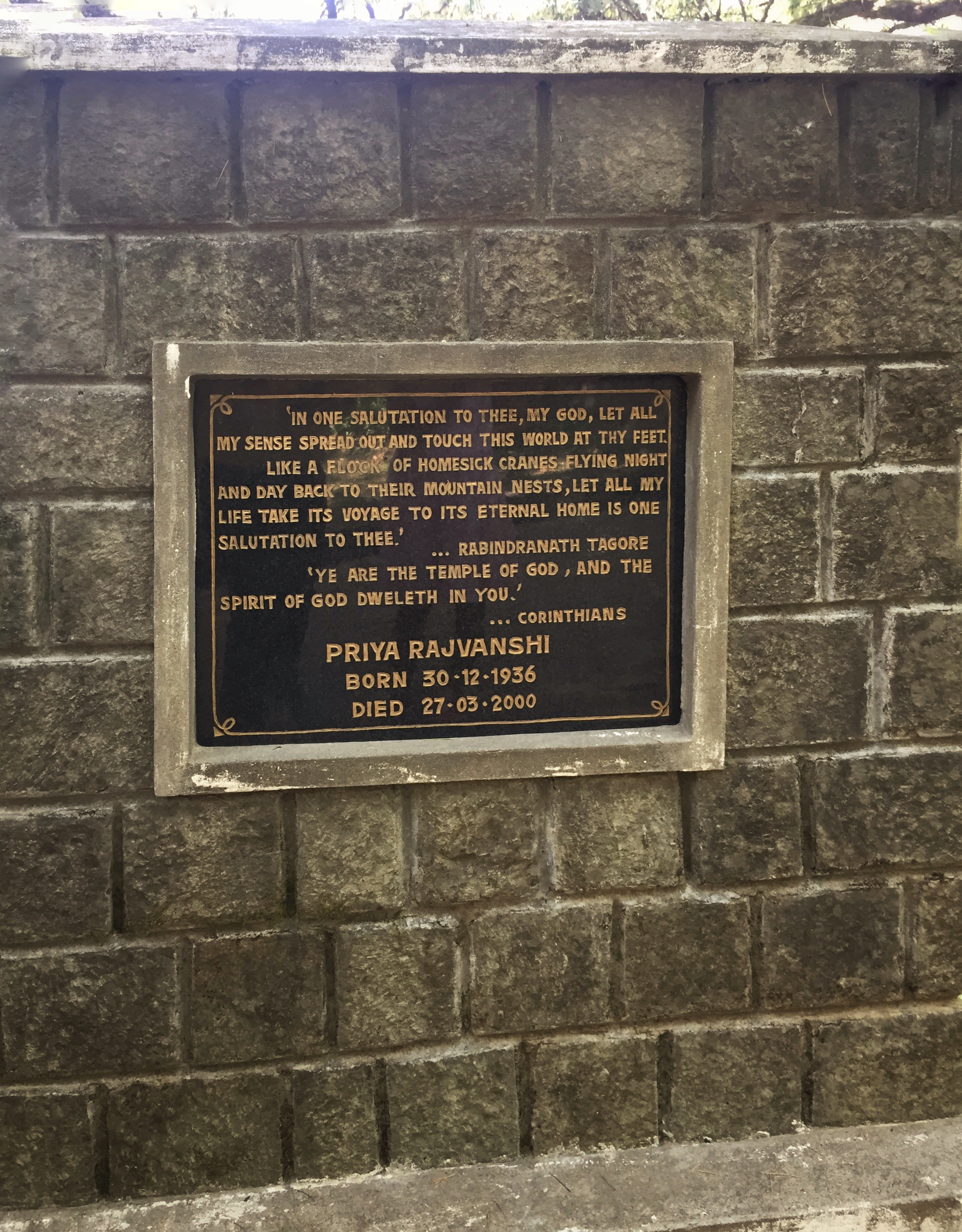
Memorial plaque at St. John in the Wilderness Church, Dharamsala

Priya Rajvansh and Chetan Anand had a personal relationship and they lived together, though she kept her own flat first in Kalumal Estate and, later, a bigger house in Mangal Kiran. Her two brothers, Kamaljit Singh (Gulu) and Padamjit Singh, reside in London and the USA respectively, and have an ancestral home in Chandigarh.

After Chetan Anand's death in 1997, she inherited a part of his property along with his sons from his first marriage. She was murdered on 27 March 2000 in Chetan Anand's Ruia Park bungalow in Juhu, Mumbai, India. Police charged Chetan Anand's sons Ketan Anand and Vivek Anand along with their employees Mala Choudhary and Ashok Chinnaswamy with her murder. Their motive was thought to be rights to her inheritance of Chetan Anand's property. Rajvansh's handwritten notes and a letter addressed by her to Vijay Anand were produced in court as evidence by the prosecution. The letter and notes throw light on Rajvansh's fear and anxiety during the period prior to her death under mysterious circumstances.

The four accused were convicted and sentenced to life imprisonment in July 2002 but they were granted bail in November 2002. In 2011, the Bombay High Court agreed to hear the appeals filed by the accused duo against the trial court's order.

== Filmography ==
As an actor
Year	Title	Role
1986	Haathon Ki Lakeeren	Mala R. Singh Yadav
1981	Kudrat	Karuna
1977	Saheb Bahadur	Meena
1973	Hanste Zakhm	Chanda
1973	Hindustan Ki Kasam	Mohini
1970	Heer Raanjha	Heer
1964	Haqeeqat	Angmo
