= Hindustan Ki Kasam (1973 film) =

- Poster
- Directed by: Chetan Anand
- Produced by: Ravi Anand
- Starring: Raaj Kumar; Vijay Anand; Priya Rajvansh; Parikshat Sahni
- Edited by: Jadhav Rao
- Music by: Madan Mohan
- Release date: 1 July 1973
- Running time: 152 minutes
- Country: India
- Language: Hindi

Hindustan Ki Kasam (English: Oath in name of Hindustan) is a 1973 Indian war film directed by Chetan Anand. It is based on Operation Cactus Lilly in the Indo-Pakistani War of 1971. Anand had previously made the popular war film Haqeeqat (1964) on the Sino-Indian War, though Hindustan Ki Kasam didn't perform well commercially.

The film is different from other war films in Indian cinema as it vividly describes the Indian Air Force's role in the 1971 Indo-Pakistani War in the western sector.

== Synopsis ==
The film starts with an air raid by Pakistan Air Force (PAF) on an Indian Air Force (IAF) airbase in the western sector in India. After the raid, a pilot takes an oath while standing near the body of a dead ground crewman - "Jawaab dene aaunga, is jawan ki kasam, Hindustan Ki Kasam" (I will avenge, I swear by this soldier, I swear by Hindustan). The credits start while the title track of the film is played in the background.

The film revolves around the IAF's mission of destroying a PAF radar, which blocks IAF pilot's radios in combat. Indian intelligence plant Mohini, who is Tahira's lookalike, fiancée of a PAF pilot. Mohini goes to Pakistan and starts working as a singer on Pakistan TV (PTV) studio (where the radar which jams the radio frequency of IAF jets is also kept). Mohini informs the IAF about the jammer. IAF asks her to leave the building in the night after her programme is done so that they can raid the building.

PAF's counter intelligence learns about her, and they zero in on her on that very night. As soon her programme is finished, the IAF air raids the studio while she is still inside. In the dogfight with Pakistani sabers, the IAF pilot's jet is destroyed, and he crashes. He radios for help, and the IAF fighters destroy the pursuing Pakistani soldiers and their vehicles. The pilot and Tahira are evacuated. The film ends with IAF's flyby on the Republic Day parade in New Delhi with the title song in the background.

== Cast ==
- Raaj Kumar as Indian Air Force pilot
- Vijay Anand
- Parikshit Sahni as Rajesh
- Priya Rajvansh as Mohini
- Padma Khanna as Tahira
- Balraj Sahni
- Chetan Anand
- Amjad Khan as Pakistan Air Force pilot
- Amrish Puri
- Bharat Kapoor as Usmaan
- Nitin Sethi
- Satyen Kappu

== Music ==
1. "Hindustan Ki Kasam" - Manna Dey, Mohammed Rafi
2. "Har Taraf Ab Yahi Afsane" - Manna Dey
3. "Hai Tere Saath Meri Wafa, Main Nahin To Kya" - Lata Mangeshkar
4. "Duniya Banane Wale Yahi Hai Meri Iltija" - Lata Mangeshkar
