= Haathon Ki Lakeeren =

- Directed by: Chetan Anand
- Written by: Veera Singh
- Produced by: Chetan Anand
- Starring: Sanjeev Kumar; Zeenat Aman; Jackie Shroff; Priya Rajvansh
- Music by: Pyare Mohan
- Release date: 1986
- Country: India
- Language: Hindi

Haathon Ki Lakeeren (Lines on the Palm) is a 1986 Indian Bollywood film produced and directed by Chetan Anand. It stars Sanjeev Kumar, Zeenat Aman, Jackie Shroff Yashodhan Pandit and Priya Rajvansh in pivotal roles.

== Cast ==
- Sanjeev Kumar as Dr. Bhanupratap
- Jackie Shroff as Lalit Mohan Singh
- Zeenat Aman as Geeta Singh
- Priya Rajvansh as Mala R. Singh Yadav
- Sudhir Dalvi as Singing Fakeer
- Bharat Kapoor as Lalit's Lawyer
- Shubha Khote as Leela
- Dina Pathak as Geeta's Mother
- Kamal Kapoor as Lalit's father

== Soundtrack ==
#	Title	Singer(s)
1	"Hai Tuhi Zindagi Meri"	Bela Sulakhe
2	"Rone Se Bichhde Yaar"	Alka Yagnik, Bela Sulakhe
3	"Ho Yeh Jawani"	Bela Sulakhe, Jatin
4	"Bekhudi Mein"	Bela Sulakhe
5	"Chalti Nahin Insaan Ki"	Mahendra Kapoor
