= Mera Pakistani Safarnama =

1960 travelogue by Balraj Sahni

- Author: Balraj Sahni
- Language: Punjabi
- Subject: A tour through Pakistan
- Genre: Travelogue
- Publication date: 1960
- Publication place: India
- Media type: Print

Mera Pakistani Safarnama (lit. 'My Journey to Pakistan') is a travelogue written in Punjabi by Indian actor Balraj Sahni. The book describes his 1960 journey through Pakistan.
