= Haqeeqat (1964 film) =

1964 Hindi film

- Theatrical release poster
- Directed by: Chetan Anand
- Written by: Chetan Anand (story, screenplay and dialogues)
- Produced by: Chetan Anand
- Starring: Dharmendra; Balraj Sahni; Priya Rajvansh; Sanjay Khan; Vijay Anand; Jayant; Sudhir
- Cinematography: Sadanand
- Edited by: M. D. Jadhav Rao
- Music by: Madan Mohan
- Production company: Himalaya Films
- Release date: 1964
- Running time: 184 minutes
- Country: India
- Language: Hindi

Haqeeqat (lit. Reality) is a 1964 Indian Hindi-language war-drama film written, directed and produced by Chetan Anand. The film stars Dharmendra, Balraj Sahni, Priya Rajvansh, Sudhir, Sanjay Khan and Vijay Anand in major roles. The music of the film is composed by Madan Mohan and the lyrics of the songs are by Kaifi Azmi. The film is based on the events of the 1962 Sino-Indian War about a small platoon of soldiers in Ladakh pitched against a much larger adversary. The film was constructed around the battle of Rezang La in Ladakh and showcases a fictionalised version of the battles fought by troops of 5 JAT in Ladakh during the 1962 War. However, the film is not only a representation of war, but a dramatic retelling of the impact war has on the common soldier. Chetan Anand dedicated the film to Jawaharlal Nehru and the soldiers in Ladakh. It is widely considered one of India's greatest black and white war films.

Haqeeqat won the National Film Award for Second Best Feature Film in 1965. In 2012, the colour version of the film was released. The film was screened retrospective on 12 August 2016 at the Independence Day Film Festival jointly presented by the Indian Directorate of Film Festivals and Ministry of Defense, commemorating the 70th Indian Independence Day.

== Plot ==
Set against the Sino-Indian War of 1962, the film's main plot concerns a small platoon of Indian soldiers in the hilly terrain of Ladakh. Captain Bahadur Singh (Dharmendra) is a keen young soldier who is in-charge of his platoon in Ladakh. On a visit to Kashmir and Ladakh Brigadier Singh (Jayant), receives news of creeping encroachment by Chinese troops along the border and orders Major Ranjit Singh (Balraj Sahni) to send his officers to secure the posts. Thus begins the struggle of the soldiers, who await further instructions while facing a wily adversary.

The region is disputed, with China claiming it as their own. The Indian soldiers have orders not to fire first and as a result the Chinese soldiers manage to effectively surround them and open fire first. Outnumbered and out-positioned, the Indian soldiers try retreating but the weather is against them. Captain Bahadur Singh makes all efforts to ensure his soldiers retreat safely, sacrificing his life in the process. His soldiers are also killed soon after. As a parallel mini-story, before his death, Captain Bahadur Singh falls in love with a local Ladakhi girl, Angmo (Priya Rajvansh). Bahadur Singh also takes Angmo's brother Sonam under his wing as the boy dreams of becoming a soldier one day.

== Production ==
The film was made with government and army assistance. Parts of the film were shot on location in Ladakh, thus becoming the first Bollywood film to be shot there. The "left-leaning" artists, (Note: "Director Chetan Anand, lyricist Kaifi Azmi and lead actor Balraj Sahni were members or supporters of CPI aligned with Moscow".) belonging to Indian People's Theatre Association, did not charge any money for their work on the film. This included director Chetan Anand, Noel Corke (Director-2nd In Charge) actor Balraj Sahni, lyricist Kaifi Azmi and actress Shaukat Azmi. The colour version, converted by Chetan Anand's son Ketan Anand, was released in 2012. The conversion, undertaken by an Indo-Australian collaboration (Q Lab of India and Time Brush Films of Australia), was a first. The film duration was also edited down.

== Themes and influences ==
The film is based on the 1962 Sino-Indian War, a war that started out as a cartographic battle fought over ownership of territory. The film is constructed around the battle of Rezang La, a battle which was considered the only part of the war in which India came out on top. Out of the 120 Indian soldiers who fought in Rezang La, 114 were killed. It is said that 1300 Chinese soldiers were also killed. While Major Shaitan Singh led Ahir Company of 13 Kumaon, Brigadier Tapishwar Narain Raina was in-charge of the brigade in Chushul which included 13 Kumaon. Brigadier TN Raina was awarded a Maha Vir Chakra and went on to become India's ninth Chief of the Army Staff in 1975; unlike the fate of many other generals of the 1962 war who "faded away in ignominy and disgrace". The Sino–Indian war is a story of Indian soldiers being treated as "sacrificial lambs", and the nation couldn't celebrate Diwali and a government was distracted with other foreign relations in Africa and South Korea.

== Cast ==
Credits adapted from Bollywood Hungama.

- Dharmendra as Captain Bahadur Singh
- Balraj Sahni as Major Ranjit Singh
- Priya Rajvansh as Angmo (debut)
- Jayant as Brigadier Singh
- Sanjay Khan as Indian Soldier
- Vijay Anand as Major Pratap Singh
- Sheikh Mukhtar as Commanding Officer
- Sudhir as Ram Singh
- In minor roles Indrani Mukherjee and Achala Sachdev
- Levi Aharon Aharoni (Negoker), brother of Priya Rajwansh (the boy in the film)

== Music ==
Haqeeqat

Film score by Madan Mohan
- Released: 1964
- Recorded: 1964
- Genre: Feature film soundtrack
- Length: 28:18

Madan Mohan chronology
| Gazal (1964) | Haqeeqat (1964) | Jahan Ara (1964) |

The music of this film has several notable songs. The music is composed by Madan Mohan and all of the songs are written by Kaifi Azmi. In a 2012 interview with Namrata Joshi for Outlook magazine, composer Madan Mohan's son Sanjeev Kohli recalls that Chetan Anand had given the music director a brief which went something like, "Indeed at the back of the mind was the lost war, but the anguish and suffering of the armed forces and the nation was all pervading. Thus, the music had to be pathos-laden, with an air of despondency. But at the end, it needed to celebrate the contribution of those that laid down their lives."

| No. | Title | Singer(s) | Length |
|---|---|---|---|
| 1. | "Ho ke Majboor Mujhe Usne Bhulaya Hoga" | Mohammed Rafi, Talat Mahmood, Manna Dey, Bhupinder Singh | 07:01 |
| 2. | "Ab Tumhare Hawaale Watan Saathiyon (Raga Bhairavi)" | Mohammed Rafi | 06:06 |
| 3. | "Zara Si Aahat Hoti Hai To Dil Sochta Hai (Raga Yaman Kalyan)" | Lata Mangeshkar | 03:51 |
| 4. | "Masti Mein Chhedke Tarana Koi Dil Ka" | Mohammed Rafi | 04:10 |
| 5. | "Khelo Naa Mere Dil Se O Mere Saajana" | Lata Mangeshkar | 03:34 |
| 6. | "Aai Ab Ki Saal Diwaali Munh Par Apne Kun Male" | Lata Mangeshkar | 05:07 |
| 7. | "Main Ye Sochkar Uske Dar Se Utha Tha (Raga Pilu)" | Mohammed Rafi | 03:17 |
| Total length: | | | 33:06 |

The music begins with lively romantic tunes and moves to more epic war, sad and celebratory tunes. The song "Ab Tumhare Hawaale Watan Saathiyon" sung by Mohammed Rafi has become synonymous with patriotism in India; with the lyrics going as "Kar chale ham fida jan-o-tan sathiyon, Ab tumhare havale vatan sathiyon" (lit. 'We have scarified our lives and our souls, the country is in your custody comrades'). This song, over five minutes long, comes at the end of the film with visuals of dead Indian soldiers all over the landscape and is based on the Raga Bhairavi (Hindustani). The Scroll comments that the song "Ho Ke Majboor Mujhe Usne Bhulaya Hoga" has become a famous tune for weary soldiers, as a distraction from the ravages of war. "Ho ke Majboor" went on to inspire "Sandese Aate Hai" from the film Border, 1997 written by Javed Akhtar, Kaifi Azmi's son-in-law.

== Awards ==
- 1965: National Film Award for Second Best Feature Film: Haqeeqat
- 1965: Filmfare Best Art Direction Award for M. S. Sathyu

== Reception ==
Comments on Haqeeqat

Their portrayal of the soldier's psyche, both in war and in peacetime, is ummatched for realism. Stark shots of jawans in Haqeeqat, bereft of equipment, numbers, supplies, artillery of air support, who die defending their posts in sub-zero temperatures against an external enemy...

— Talukdar (2004)

The Deccan Chronicle reports that in 1964, Satyajit Ray, on seeing the film, had told the director, "Chetan, I saw Haqeeqat. Strong visuals, excellent music, but no story". Reportedly Chetan Anand replied, "Haqeeqat is not a story. It is a mosaic." In 1965 critic Edith Laurie said that Haqeeqat "is the first movie treatment of India’s war with China," is full of "patriotic cliches". He said the enemy was depicted as per the national narrative and that "the eye-rolling Chinese are reminiscent of sinister Japanese in America’s World War-II movies".

In the film, director and writer Chetan Anand accepts India's defeat in the war, showcasing the overpowering grief that comes as a result.

Film-maker Vijay Anand, a brother of Chetan Anand, said "the film glorified the Indian Army in its moment of grief. It was a tribute to our soldiers [...] You need guts to make a film like this".

The film made about ₹1 crore (equivalent to ₹80 crore or US$8.3 million in 2026).

== Legacy and commentary ==
Haqeeqat is widely remembered as one of India's greatest black and white war films, if not the greatest. Despite India losing the war and history fairly blaming Nehru for the loss, Haqeeqat "makes its admiration for Nehru clear" and in the film Anand goes along with the government line that the war and its outcome was the fault of the Chinese. However Nehru died before the film could be released in 1964. Chetan Anand dedicated the film to Jawaharlal Nehru and the soldiers in Ladakh. The film has been called a "cultural document about an event that had severe long-term impacts on the country". For most, Haqeeqat is the only film reference of the war. In 2012 Namrata Joshi wrote in Outlook magazine that Haqeeqat was to be "a reminder of China’s betrayal" and the feelings that came along with this were reflected in the film, such as the scene of a bayonet stabbing Mao Zedong's Red Book.

In 2016, the film was screened at the Independence Day Film Festival by the Directorate of Film Festivals and the Ministry of Defence. On Independence Day in 2017, ZeeTV premiered the film on Zee Classic. In the backdrop of the 2017 Doklam standoff Haqeeqat was again remembered by the Indian media as a comparison for 1962 and the current tensions; to be specific the last stand of Ahir Company, 13 Kumaon led by Major Shaitan Singh at Rezang La. In the backdrop of the 2020 China–India skirmishes, on 6 July 2020, an article in The Quint by Pankhuri Shukla comments on the "unsanitized" two-hour long portrayal of war in the film. The fights are not "sugarcoated" and the internal conflict of what is means to be a soldier are depicted. In July 2020, Filmfare listed Haqeeqat as one of Bollywood's top war films.

The 2025 film,120 Bahadur, is also based on the same historical events from the 1962 war.
