= Door Chalen =

1946 film directed by Phani Majumdar

- Directed by: Phani Majumdar
- Release date: 1946
- Country: India
- Language: Hindi

Door Chalen is a Bollywood drama film, directed by Phani Majumdar and starring Naseem Banu and Balraj Sahni. It was released in 1946.

== Cast ==
- Balraj Sahni
- Naseem Banu
