= Chandrashekhar Gadgil =

- Born: 1947
- Origin: Pune, Maharashtra, India
- Died: 2 October 2014
- Genre: Indian classical music
- Occupations: Singer and composer
- Instrument: Vocal

Chandrashekhar Gadgil (1947 – 2 October 2014) was an Indian playback singer of the Marathi and Hindi Cinema. He sang a lot of songs composed by R.D. Burman. He wrote a book titled Shaapit Gandharva. He started his career as an orchestra singer and then became a playback singer Brother = Sudhir Gadgil and Surendra Gadgil

== Discography in films ==
- Zunj (1975) (Famous Marathi Songs as "Nisaragraja Aik Sangato" & "Kon Hotis Tu Kay Zalis Tu")
- Paradh
- Navare Sagale Gadhav
- Ashtvinayak
- Nate Jadale Don Jivanche
- Devkinandan Gopala
- Pandoba Porgi Fasali
- Kudrat
- Padarachya Savalit
- Are Sansar Sansar
- Janaki
- Rajmata
- Ashanti (1982 film) Shakti de ma
