= Heer Raanjha =

1970 Hindi film by Chetan Anand

Heer Ranjha
- Film Poster
- Directed by: Chetan Anand
- Screenplay by: Chetan Anand
- Story by: Waris Shah
- Based on: Heer by Waris Shah
- Produced by: Himalaya Films
- Starring: Raaj Kumar; Priya Rajvansh
- Narrated by: Chetan Anand
- Cinematography: Jal Mistry
- Edited by: M. D. Jadhav Rao
- Music by: Madan Mohan
- Release date: 1970
- Running time: 142 minutes
- Country: India
- Language: Hindustani

Heer Raanjha is a 1970 Indian Hindi-language romantic musical film directed by Chetan Anand and produced by his son Ketan Anand. The film stars Raaj Kumar, Priya Rajvansh, Pran, Prithviraj Kapoor, Ajit, Jayant, Sonia Sahni, Kamini Kaushal, Indrani Mukherjee, Achla Sachdev and Tun Tun. The film's music is by Madan Mohan. The film is based on the legend of Heer Ranjha, the epic poem Heer by Punjabi poet, Waris Shah, written in 1766. As with Waris Shah's classical retelling of the tragic romance of Heer Ranjha, the entire film and its dialogue is in verse, with Urdu poet Kaifi Azmi writing the verse dialogue.

The film's songs and music are notable as is the photography by Jal Mistry, who shot most of Chetan Anand's films and won the Filmfare Award for the film. The film also showcases some of the best dialogues from the legendary actor Raaj Kumar. It was a box-office hit.

== Plot ==
Raanjha (Raaj Kumar), a handsome, carefree young man, is the local Romeo of the village of Takht Hazara. He lives with his seven wealthy older brothers and their families in a large house. He plans to travel to the village of Jhang where his close friend is getting married. His family stops him as the people of Takht Hazara and Jhang have been fierce enemies for ages. He ignores their warning and leaves for the wedding.

During the wedding dance, he crosses paths with a charming young girl, Heer (Priya Rajvansh), the daughter of a landlord from Jhang. He falls for her beauty and grace. Later, when playing hide and seek with her friends, Heer accidentally catches hold of Raanjha. He expresses his desire of getting to know her. When she hears that he is from the enemy village, she fears for his life and asks him to go away. Raanjha refuses to leave. He promises to stay for as long as the river Chenab flows. Heer is elated and persuades her parents to employ him as their cowherd. They agree without knowing her true feelings for him. She regurlalry brings food for Raanjha and they develop a warm friendship. He confesses his love and asks if she feels the same. Too shocked to reply, she runs away to her home. The next day, she waits to meet him at the village fair. To her dismay, he doesn't turn up. She visits his home and asks why he didn't come to meet her. A quiet Raanjha replies that he is still waiting for her reply to his proposal. By means of a song, Heer reveals that she loves him. Raanjha is filled with happiness. Heer's mother and friends come searching for her. Trying to hide from them, she falls into the nearby river and almost drowns. Raanjha risks his life and saves her. Heer's father Bade Choudhary (Jayant) gifts him a hefty amount as a reward. Using this money, he buys new clothes, jewellery and gifts to woo her. The lovers continue meeting in secret with the help of her friends.

Chote Choudhury (Pran), Heer's uncle, visits town. Due to his physical limitations, he was unable to find a bride. When he sees people finding love or getting married, it makes him furious. He spots Heer and Raanjha embracing in the garden. He is filled with jealousy. Just before Heer can tell her parents about Raanjha, Chote Choudhary reveals their affair to her family. Teaming up with Heer's mother (Veena Sapru), he ties up Raanjha and plots to get rid of him. They plan to get Heer married to a wealthy man named Saida(Ajit). Seeing his only child heartbroken and distraught, Bade Choudhary frees Raanjha. Despite the rivalry between their villages, he asks Raanjha to bring his family and make peace. Overjoyed, he returns home and asks his brothers to talk to Heer's family. They are surprised and happy at the prospect of making peace with the people of Jhang. But Chote Choudhury hires goons who insult and chase Raanjha's family away from entering the village. Raajha's brothers feel this was a plot to humiliate them. They lock him up in a room and refuse to talk to him.

The older men of Jhang tell Bade Choudhary to get Heer married as she is setting a bad example to other young girls. Crumbling under pressure, he agrees to marry her off to Saida despite Heer's repeated refusals. The man conducting the wedding, Kazi, accepts a bribe from Chote Choudhury and lies that Heer accepted the proposal of the wedding.

Heer is forcibly taken to Saida's house. Raanjha escapes from his home and vents his anger on Heer's father for breaking his promise. Her father, in turn, calls him a traitor. As they talk, both the men realise who was behind the plot- Chote Choudhury. In Saida's house, Heer explains to him that their marriage is illegal as she never agreed to it. Saida refuses to believe her and tries to force himself on her. She resists him and proclaims her love only for Raanjha. Saida's younger sister comes right on time and helps her. Heer continues to live in Saida's house as a servant. Weeks later, Raanjha becomes a wanderer and travels to Saida's village not knowing Heer is there. When he comes to Saida's house, he sees Heer and is overwhelmed with happiness. Though she doesn't recognise him at first, she realises it his him in a disguise. That night, she runs away and reunites with Raanjha.

Saida's men catch them and cruelly drag them to his home. But they are saved by the king's soldiers who happened to be passing by. The soldiers take them to the king to solve the matter. Upon hearing the case from Heer and Saida, the king is perplexed. Chote Choudhury and Kazi paint Heer as a malicious liar deserving of death. However, one of Raanjha's friends, a mute tailor, stands up in court and testifies to have seen Kazi accepting a bribe from Chote Choudhury.

The king (Prithviraj Kapoor) rules in favour of Heer and Raanjha. Heer's and Raanjha's families come together and conduct the wedding in a grand manner. With great pomp and show, Raanjha takes Heer to his house in a palanquin. When they reach his home, Heer is found dead. It turns out that Chote Choudhury fed her a delicacy laced with poison. Heartbroken seeing his beloved dead, Raanjha also dies. Their families are devastated and mourn the loss of the two lovers.

== Cast ==
- Raaj Kumar as Ranjha
- Priya Rajvansh as Heer
- Jayant as Heer's father, Choudhury
- Veena as Heer's mother
- Pran as Chhote Choudhury, Heer's paternal uncle
- Tun Tun as Allah Rakhi, maid servant in Heer's parental household
- Ajit as Saida (Khera), Heer's husband
- Mumtaz Begum as Saida's mother and Heer's mother-in-law
- Jeevan as Kaazi, the Muslim priest who conducts Heer's wedding
- Prithviraj Kapoor as The King
- Nana Palsikar as Diwan, the King's Inquisitor
- Ulhas
- Manmohan
- D.K. Sapru
- Irshad Panjatan

Ranjha had six older brothers. Their wives were played by:

- Kamini Kaushal
- Indrani Mukherjee
- Achala Sachdev
- Shaukat Azmi
- Padma Khanna
- Tabassum

== Soundtrack ==
Heer Raanjha

Soundtrack album by Madan Mohan
- Released: 1970 (India)
- Genre: Film soundtrack
- Label: EMI
- Producer: Madan Mohan

Madan Mohan chronology
| Maa Ka Aanchal (1970) | Heer Raanjha (1970) | Dastak (1970) |

The soundtrack includes the following tracks, composed by Madan Mohan, with lyrics by Kaifi Azmi, and is especially remembered for the poignant "Yeh Duniya, Yeh Mehfil Mere Kaam Ki Nahin", sung by Mohammed Rafi.

| Song | Singer | Raga |
|---|---|---|
| "Milo Na Tum To" | Lata Mangeshkar | |
| "Do Dil Toote Do Dil Hare" | Lata Mangeshkar | Pahadi |
| "Doli Chadhte Heer Heer Ne Bain Kiye" | Lata Mangeshkar | Bhairavi |
| "Meri Duniya Mein Tum Aayi" | Lata Mangeshkar, Mohammed Rafi | Yaman Kalyan |
| "Tere Kooche Mein Tera Deewana" | Mohammed Rafi | |
| "Yeh Duniya, Yeh Mehfil Mere Kaam Ki Nahin" | Mohammed Rafi | |
| "Jo Moti Teri Nani Hai" | Hemlata, S Balbir, Krishna Kalle, Usha Timothy | |
| "Nache Ang Ve" | Shamshad Begum, Jagjit Kaur | |

== Awards ==
- 1971: Filmfare Award
- Filmfare Best Cinematographer Award: Jal Mistry

== See also ==
- Jagga Jasoos, a 2017 Indian musical film with the dialogues mostly in verse (a sung-through like Heer Raanjha)
- Punjabi folklore
- Punjabi Qisse
- Folklore of India
