= Kudrat =

1981 film by Chetan Anand

- Film poster
- Directed by: Chetan Anand
- Written by: Chetan Anand
- Produced by: B. S. Khanna
- Starring: Raaj Kumar; Rajesh Khanna; Hema Malini; Vinod Khanna; Priya Rajvansh; Aruna Irani; Deven Verma
- Cinematography: Jal Mistry
- Edited by: Keshav Naidu
- Music by: R. D. Burman
- Production companies: Mehboob Studios; R. K. Studios; Shimla
- Distributed by: Trishakti Productions
- Release date: 3 April 1981
- Running time: 165 minutes
- Country: India
- Language: Hindi

Kudrat (transl. Nature) is a 1981 Indian Hindi-language drama film, written and directed by Chetan Anand. The film stars Rajesh Khanna and Hema Malini, supported by Raaj Kumar, Priya Rajvansh and Vinod Khanna. This is the second movie of the Rajesh Khanna-Hema Malini pair with a reincarnation theme after Mehbooba. Rajesh Khanna received the 1982 All-India Critics Association (AICA) Best Actor Award for Kudrat. The film was a box office hit and it won the Filmfare Award for Best Story.

== Plot ==
Chandramukhi, accompanied by her parents, visits the hill resort of Shimla for the first time in her life. She senses some familiarity with the place and gets strange feelings, for which she does not know the reason. Chandramukhi and her family meet Dr. Naresh Gupta. Naresh is attracted towards Chandramukhi and their families talk about getting them married to each other. Mohan Kapur, an upcoming lawyer, comes to Shimla to meet his patron and godfather, Janak Singh. Mohan owes his education and career to Janak Singh's generosity. Janak Singh wants his daughter Karuna, also a lawyer, to marry Mohan. Mohan agrees out of gratitude to his patron and gets engaged to Karuna.

Once, Chandramukhi dashes into Mohan and feels some strange connection with him. Mohan also meets an elderly singer named Saraswati Devi. She is shocked to see him, but does not say anything. Whenever Chandramukhi meets Mohan, she acts strangely. She has nightmares of a man named Madhav, who is Mohan's doppelganger, plummeting to death from a cliff. Naresh senses that something is amiss and coerces Mohan to help him find the truth. On an excursion, Chandramukhi remembers everything: She was Paro in previous life and Madhav was her lover. A zamindar's son raped her and accidentally murdered her.

Here, Naresh too realizes that he should step out of their life, as their romance soon gets rekindled. Here, with help of Chandramukhi, Mohan soon finds out that Saraswati Devi is Satto, Madhav's sister. Satto tells them that the villain is none other than Janak. Mohan is in a dilemma: he has broken off his engagement with Karuna for Chandramukhi and now he has to drag Janak to court. Realizing that he has no other option, Mohan decides to take matters to the court. Karuna, who doesn't have an idea of the truth, steps in to defend her father against this "conspiracy".

Here, it is revealed that Janak is indeed guilty of the death of both Paro and Madhav. He raped Paro and after listening this, Madhav commits suicide. Paro had cursed him that just as he took away something precious to her, Mother Nature will take something important from him too. Meanwhile, Mohan seems to be losing the case, until he finds the mansion where Paro was purportedly murdered. He also traces Billi Ram, a senile old mason, who may hold a clue to Paro's disappearance. Billi Ram remembers that Janak had called him that day to patch up a wall in the mansion.

Mohan comes to the mansion with police, who tear the wall down. A skeleton tumbles out in front of Karuna. Shocked by this revelation, Karuna goes to her home and sets it on fire. She sits inside, playing a piano and succumbs to the fire. After learning of his daughter's death and the new discovery, Janak realizes that Paro's curse has done its work. Later, Janak pleads guilty for his crime in the court and is sentenced accordingly. As he is escorted out, he and Chandramukhi see each other for the last time. After Chandramukhi and Mohan get united, and Naresh heads to America.

== Cast ==
Actor/Actress	Character/Role	Notes
Rajesh Khanna	Mohan Kapoor/Madhov	
Hema Malini	Chandramukhi/Paro	
Raaj Kumar	Choudhury Janak Singh	
Vinod Khanna	Dr. Naresh Gupta	
Priya Rajvansh	Karuna Singh	as Priya Raajvansh
Aruna Irani	Saraswati Devi (Satto)	
Deven Verma	Pyarelal	as Devan Verma
A. K. Hangal	Billi Ram	
Om Shivpuri	Judge	
Keshto Mukherjee	Jagat Ram	as Keshto Mukerjee
Satyendra Kapoor	Paro's father	as Satyen Kapoor
Pinchoo Kapoor	Chandramukhi's father	
Raj Mehra	Priest	
Shammi	Sarla	
D. K. Sapru	Janak Singh's Father	as Sapru
Sunder	Villager	
Tom Alter	Major Thomas Walters	
Julie	Judy Thomas	as Jullie
Harbans Darshan M. Arora	Munshi	
Sunder Taneja	Rai Saheb's son	
Kalpana Iyer	Dancer (song Chhodo Sanam)	
Mukri		

== Soundtrack ==
The film's music was composed by R. D. Burman and the lyrics written by Majrooh Sultanpuri and Qateel Shifai. While Majrooh wrote all the songs of the film, the title song "Dukh Sukh Ki Har Ek Mala" was written by Qateel Shifai and beautifully sung by newcomer singer Chandrashekhar Gadgil and then by Mohammed Rafi. The song "Hamen Tumse Pyar Kitna" is heard twice in the film, the first time by a female singer (Parveen Sultana) and the second time by a male singer (Kishore Kumar). Kumar was nominated for a Filmfare Award for his rendering of the song, while Sultana walked away with the Filmfare Best Female Playback Award for her version of the song.

Song	Singer	Raga
"Hamen Tumse Pyar Kitna (Male)"	Kishore Kumar	Bhairavi (Hindustani)
"Hamen Tumse Pyar Kitna (Female)"	Parveen Sultana	Bhairavi (Hindustani)
"Chhodo Sanam, Kaahe Ka Gham"	Kishore Kumar, Annette	
"Dukh Sukh Ki Har Ek Mala"	Mohammed Rafi, Chandrashekhar Gadgil	
"Tune O Rangeele"	Lata Mangeshkar	
"Sawan Nahin, Bhadon Nahin, O Bindiyawali Bata"	Suresh Wadkar, Asha Bhosle	
"Sajti Hai Yun Hi Mehfil"	Asha Bhosle	

== Accolades ==
29th Filmfare Awards:

Won

- Best Female Playback Singer – Parveen Sultana for "Hume Tumse Pyaar Kitna"
- Best Story – Chetan Anand
- Best Cinematography – Jal Mistry

Nominated

- Best Male Playback Singer – Kishore Kumar for "Hume Tumse Pyaar Kitna"
