= Ghar Ghar Ki Kahani (1970 film) =

1970 Hindi film directed by T. Prakash Rao

- Directed by: T. Prakash Rao
- Produced by: B. Nagi Reddy
- Starring: Rakesh Roshan; Bharathi; Balraj Sahni; Nirupa Roy; Om Prakash; Shashikala
- Cinematography: Marcus Bartley
- Music by: Kalyanji-Anandji
- Production company: Vijaya Productions
- Release date: 1970
- Country: India
- Language: Hindi

Ghar Ghar Ki Kahani (transl. The story of every home) is a 1970 Hindi-language drama film directed by T. Prakash Rao. The film stars Balraj Sahni, Nirupa Roy and Om Prakash in lead roles, supported by Rakesh Roshan, Bharathi, Shashikala and others.The remake and adaptation rights of this film are now owned by Glamour Eyes Films.

== Plot ==
Shankarnath (Balraj Sahni) is an honest Government employee, while his subordinate Sadhuram (Om Prakash) is a corrupt employee. Shankarnath, even though employed in a supervisory capacity, nets only Rs.630/-, and hence is unable to accede to any of the demands placed by his three school-going children, Ravi, Roopa, and Raja. When the trio declares a hunger-fast until their demands are met, he decides to let them run the household expenses, for a period of six months, by giving Ravi his entire salary. Ravi thinks that he can save a lot of money and get stuff for himself and his siblings - but things go seriously wrong when Raja loses money while gambling; relatives descend on them during Diwali; cash is stolen; and his mother, Padma (Nirupa Roy), becomes seriously ill.

== Cast ==
- Rakesh Roshan as Suresh
- Bharathi as Seema
- Balraj Sahni as Shankarnath
- Nirupa Roy as Padma
- Om Prakash as Sadhuram
- Shashikala as Jamna
- Gajanan Jagirdar as Padma's Brother
- Sulochana Chatterjee as Suresh's Mother
- Jagdeep as Surendra
- Shabnam as Surendra's Wife
- Maruti as Panduram
- Praveen Paul as Gopi's Mother
- Jalal Agha as College Student
- Mahesh Kothare as Ravi
- Neetu Singh as Roopa
- Master Ripple as Raja
- Mehmood Jr. as Gopi
- Birbal as Shankarnath's Subordinate

== Soundtrack ==
Song	Singer
"Aisa Banoonga Actor Main Yaaron"	Hemlata
"Aise Na Na Dekho Kanha"	Lata Mangeshkar
"Jai Nandlala, Jai Jai Gopala"	Lata Mangeshkar
"Sama Hai Suhana Suhana"	Kishore Kumar
"Hey Re Daya May Apni Daya"	Asha Bhosle, Mukesh, Nitin Mukesh
