= Double Cross (1972 film) =

- Directed by: Gogi Anand
- Starring: Vijay Anand; Rekha
- Music by: R. D. Burman
- Release date: 1973
- Country: India
- Language: Hindi

Double Cross is a 1973 Bollywood action film directed by Gogi Anand. The film stars Vijay Anand and Rekha .

== Cast ==
- Vijay Anand as Ajay Arya / Vijay Arya / Jimmy
- Rekha as Rekha
- Madan Puri as Magan Bhai
- Asha Sachdev as Lily
- Manmohan as Card-sharp
- Rajeeta Thakur as Sonia

== Soundtrack ==
Music of the movie is composed by R. D. Burman.

Songs	Singer
"Main Jhonka Mast Hawa Ka"	Kishore Kumar
"Dekho, Hum Dono Ki Yaari Kya Kehna"	Kishore Kumar, Bhupinder Singh
"Maine Tumko Chaaha Pehli Baar"	Kishore Kumar, Asha Bhosle
"Jeevanbhar Ke Liye Tu Mere Saath Hai"	Kishore Kumar, Asha Bhosle
"Aiyo Aiyo Kahdo Zamane Se, Hum Dilwale Milke Kar Daale"	Kishore Kumar, Asha Bhosle
