= Ghar Sansar (1958 film) =

- Directed by: V. M. Vyas
- Written by: Wahid Qureshi
- Screenplay by: M. G. Dave
- Story by: M. G. Dave
- Produced by: A. A. Nadiadwala
- Starring: Nargis; Balraj Sahni; Rajendra Kumar; Kumkum; Johnny Walker
- Cinematography: P. Issac
- Edited by: Dharamvir
- Music by: Ravi
- Production company: Pushpa Pictures
- Distributed by: Pushpa Pictures
- Release date: 1958
- Country: India
- Language: Hindi

Ghar Sansar is a 1958 Hindi drama film directed by V. M. Vyas, starring Balraj Sahni, Nargis, Rajendra Kumar and Kumkum in lead roles.

== Cast ==
- Balraj Sahni as Kailash
- Nargis as Uma
- Rajendra Kumar as Deepak
- Kumkum as Jyoti
- Johnny Walker as Banke

== Soundtrack ==
Ravi composed the music of the film, while lyricists Majrooh Sultanpuri and S. H. Bihari penned the songs.

Song	Singer
"Bhala Karnewale" (Part 1)	Mohammed Rafi
"Bhala Karnewale" (Part 2)	Mohammed Rafi
"Abhi Shabab Ke Din Hai, Na Yun Machalke Chalo"	Asha Bhosle, Mohammed Rafi
"Chhedo Dhoon Matwalon Ki Behki Behki Chaalon Ki"	Asha Bhosle, Mohammed Rafi
"Honth Gulabi, Gaal Katore, Naina Surmaidan"	Asha Bhosle, Mohammed Rafi
"Yeh Hawa, Yeh Nadi Ka Kinara"	Asha Bhosle, Manna Dey
"Sapnon Ki Dor Bandhi"	Asha Bhosle
"Bhabhi Kare Apeel"	Asha Bhosle
