= Kar chale hum fida =

1964 song by Kaifi Azmi

"Kar Chale Ham Fida" is a song written by Urdu poet Kaifi Azmi, which featured in the soundtrack of the 1964 Hindi film Haqeeqat. Music director Madan Mohan compiled the music and it was sung by Mohammad Rafi. In her memories of her life with her husband, Shaukat Kaifi recalled that the song "achieved the status of an anthem". It has been used in election campaigns in India.

This song also appears as a poem in a NCERT [India] Class 10 Textbook Sparsh
