= Hanste Zakhm =

- Directed by: Chetan Anand
- Produced by: Chetan Anand
- Starring: Navin Nischol; Priya Rajvansh; Balraj Sahni; Jeevan
- Music by: Madan Mohan
- Release date: 1973
- Country: India
- Language: Hindi

Hanste Zakhm (transl. Laughing Wounds) is a 1973 Indian Hindi film produced and directed by Chetan Anand. The film stars Navin Nischol, Priya Rajvansh, Balraj Sahni, Jeevan in pivotal roles. The film has music composed by Madan Mohan and lyrics written by Kaifi Azmi. This movie features the unforgettable evergreen songs by Lata Mangeshkar and Mohammed Rafi under music direction of Madan Mohan, which turned out to be chartbusters. The most famous song in this film is "Tum Jo Mil Gaye Ho". The other song is a qawwali, "Yeh Mana Meri Jaan" whose tune has been remade numerous times. Madan Mohan produced one of the best works of his life for this feature film. "Tum Jo Mil Gaye Ho" was adjudged the fourth best hindi film song ever by a jury of eminent musicians for an Outlook magazine poll.

https://www.outlookindia.com/art-entertainment/20-best-hindi-film-songs-ever-news-231648 The song is still a rage among youngsters and lovebirds. This movie collected Rs.72000 at capital cinema, which was a record back then and was declared a hit at the box office. it was remade in Pakistan as Aroosa (1993) starring Naddam, Reema Khan, and Jan Rambo.

== Plot ==
The film begins with Mahendru (Balraj Sahni), a widowed police officer and his young daughter, Chanda. Chanda's best friend is Rekha (Suman Sikand), the daughter of a prostitute. Rekha stays over at Chanda's house, when Rekha's mother accidentally kills someone in an effort to stop her pimp (Jeevan) from carrying off Rekha into prostitution as well. She is sent to prison, and begs Mahendru not to reveal to Rekha anything about her life as a working girl. Mahendru promises to protect and raise the child as his own daughter. The pimp, Jeevan, attempts to kidnap Rekha, but his goons mistakenly kidnap Chanda. When he realizes the error, he decides to make the best of a bad situation by asking Mahendru for a large ransom. Mahendru borrows the ransom money from a friend, but the pimp deceives him and delivers the girl to a madam (Nadira).

Many years later, we find cab driver Somesh (Navin Nischol) driving Chanda (Priya Rajvansh) to her clients. Somesh is the ne'er-do-well scion of a rich family, who has a falling out with his father as he refuses to marry Rekha, the Police Officer's daughter. He leaves his wealthy home & life-style to become a cab-driver. Chanda and Somesh fall in love. Chanda eventually realizes that she really is Mahendru's daughter. This leads her to assume the daughter's duty by trying to convince Somesh to marry Rekha, her sister. She does this by turning alcoholic, in an effort to prove her essential wanton-ness to Somesh - who does not understand her intention and refuses to live his life according to her ideals of filial responsibility. Later, the pimp kidnaps Chanda again and informs Mahendru that his daughter is under his captivity and tries to blackmail him for the release of Chanda. However, Mahendru refuses to give in and attacks Jivan's camp with a police force. Chanda dies in this rescue operation. Before dying in her father Mahendru's arms, Chanda asks Somesh to marry Rekha, and he does.

== Cast ==
- Navin Nischol as Somesh
- Priya Rajvansh as Meena / Chanda
- Balraj Sahni as SP Dinanath Mahendru
- Jeevan as Kundan
- Nadira as Brothel Madam
- Achala Sachdev as Heera Bai
- Murad as DIG
- D. K. Sapru as Banwari
- Kamal Kapoor as Daulat Singh
- Mac Mohan as Braganza
- Bharat Kapoor as Somesh's Friend
- Ram Sethi as Ganesh
- Satyen Kappu as Inspector Kumar
- Suman Sikand as Rekha

== Music ==
Composed by Madan Mohan the songs of the film are popular. Lyrics written by Kaifi Azmi.

Song	Singer	Raga
"Aaj Socha To Aansoo"	Lata Mangeshkar	
"Betaab Dil Ki Tamanna"	Lata Mangeshkar	
"Yeh Mana Meri Jaan"	Mohammed Rafi, S.Balbir	
"Tum Jo Mil Gaye Ho"	Lata Mangeshkar, Mohammed Rafi	Bhimpalasi
"Gali Gali Mein Kiya Hai"	Asha Bhosle	
