= Gudia (1947 film) =

1947 film

Gudia was a 1947 Indian drama film, starring Eddie Billimoria, Balraj Sahni, and Damayanti Sahni.
