= Bharat Kapoor =

Indian film and television actor (1945–2026)

- Born: 15 October 1945
- Died: 27 April 2026 (aged 80)
- Occupation: Actor
- Years active: 1972–2011

Bharat Kapoor (15 October 1945 – 27 April 2026) was an Indian film and television actor.

== Life and career ==
Kapoor was born on 15 October 1945. He began acting in 1972 and starred in the television series Bhagyavidhaata on India's Colors television channel between 2009 and 2011. Kapoor died after a long illness on 27 April 2026, at the age of 80.

== Filmography ==
=== Film ===
- Jangal Mein Mangal (1972) – Police inspector
- Nafrat (1973) – Kishan
- Hindustan Ki Kasam (1973) – Usman
- Hanste Zakhm (1973) – Somesh's friend
- Gupt Gyan (1974) – Doctor
- Jaaneman (1976)
- Saheb Bahadur (1977) – Doctor
- Inkaar (1977) – Manmohan
- Toote Khilone (1978)
- Dil Se Mile Dil (1978) – Inspector
- Des Pardes (1978) – Murarilal
- Noorie (1979) – Basheer Khan
- Beqasoor (1980) – Inspector Shekhar Purohit
- Ram Balram (1980) – Chandarbhan
- Nakhuda (1981) – Saifu (Sheikhu's son)
- Love Story (1981) – Basheera
- Bulundi (1981) – Harish
- Sannata (1981) – Seth Dhanpat Rai, Sarika's uncle
- Aapas Ki Baat (1981) – Vinod Sinha
- Taaqat (1982) – Sher Singh
- Bazaar (1982 film) – Akhtar Hussain
- Ustadi Ustad Se (1982) – Prem
- Swami Dada (1982) – Lallu
- Painter Babu (1983) – Sheru
- Qayamat (1983) – Makhan
- Preet Na Jane Reet (1984)
- Paapi Pet Ka Sawaal Hai (1984)
- Maan Maryada (1984) – Thakur Vikram Singh
- Teri Pooja Kare Sansaar (1985)
- Karm Yudh (1985) – Shakti
- Haqeeqat (1985) – Pandey's advocate
- Ghulami (1985) – Thakur Shakti Singh
- Meetha Zehar (1985)
- Balidaan (1985) – Jaggu
- Surkhiyaan (The Headlines) (1985) – R. Pradhan
- Ek Daku Saher Mein (1985) – Lala Manohar Lal
- Hum Naujawan (1985) – College Trustee
- Patton Ki Bazi (1986) – Balwant Sethi 'Billa'
- Haathon Ki Lakeeren (1986) – Lalit's lawyer
- Aakhree Raasta (1986) – Dr. Varma
- Pyar Ki Jeet (1987) – Jagirdar
- Satyamev Jayate (1987) – Police inspector Ravi Verma
- Mere Baad (1988) – Police inspector
- Sone Pe Suhaaga (1988) – Prakash, Union Leader
- Khoon Bahaa Ganga Mein (1988)
- Jag Wala Mela (1988) – Chaudhry
- Hum Farishte Nahin (1988) – INSP. Verma
- Aag Ke Sholay (1988) – Zamindar
- Pyar Ka Mandir (1988) – Gopal Khaitan
- Parbat Ke Us Paar (1988)
- Jurrat (1989) – Kama's lawyer
- Jaaydaad (1989) – Thakur Bharat (Shanti's Husband)
- Bhabo (1989) – Mahender
- Kahan Hai Kanoon (1989) – Senior Police Officer
- Ilaaka (1989) – Birju
- Sikka (1989) – Gupta (Pranlal's agent)
- Apna Desh Paraye Log (1989) – Corrupt police officer
- Pyasi Nigahen (1990) – Politician Suryabhan
- Kroadh (1990) – Jailor
- Swarg (1990) – Nagpal
- C.I.D. (1990) – Sunil Saxena
- Kasam Kali Ki (1991) – Immoral Jagirdar
- Trinetra (1991) – Bhavishyavani
- Phoolwati (1991)
- Khel (1991) – Vinod's elder brother
- Bhediyon Ka Samooh: A Pack of Wolves (1991) – Intelligence officer Ghorpade
- Jigarwala (1991) – Corrupt officer
- Khoon Ka Karz (1991) – Police commissioner D.M. Mehta
- Paap Ki Aandhi (1991) – Chinai
- Deshwasi (1991) – Swami Satyanand
- Kurbaan (1991) – Maan Singh
- Yeh Aag Kab Bujhegi (1991) – Defence lawyer
- Vishkanya (1991) – Wali Khan
- Geet Milan Ke Gaate Rahenge(1992)
- Insaan Bana Shaitaan (1992) – Lawyer Sampatlal
- Virodhi (1992) – Corrupt police inspector Amar Singh
- Laat Saab (1992) – Nawab
- Khuda Gawah (1992) – Insp. Aziz Mirza
- Isi Ka Naam Zindagi (1992) – Chinky's Father
- Insaan Bana Shaitan (1992)
- Khel (1992) – as Vinod brother's special appearance
- Zindagi Ek Juaa (1992) – Mr. Rana
- Sahibaan (1993) – Diwan Durga 'Durge' Singh
- King Uncle (1993) – Mr. Malik
- Antim Nyay (1993) (uncredited) – Deputy Minister
- Krishan Avtaar (1993)
- Rang (1993) – Mr. Joshi
- Ekka Raja Rani (1994) – Police commissioner
- Sholay Aur Toofan (1994)
- Chauraha (1994) – Police Commissioner
- Ishq Mein Jeena Ishq Mein Marna (1994)
- Naaraaz (1994) – Jagadamba
- Police Lock-up (1995) – Inspector Singhal
- Fauj (1995) – Thakur Karan Singh
- Aatank Hi Aatank (1995) – Gogia Advani
- Barsaat (1995) – R.K. Mehra
- Ram Shastra (1995) – Dhonga's lawyer
- Saajan Chale Sasural (1996) – Thakur
- Shohrat (1996) – Inspector Vijay Saxena
- Himmatvar (1996) – Inspector Shrikant
- Hai Kaun Woh (1999) – Prem
- Agniputra (2000) – Governor Ashutosh Tripathi
- Meenaxi: A Tale of Three Cities (2004) – Masa

=== Television ===
- Zee Horror Show Taveez (1993) Episodes 3 – Mahajan
- Campus (1993–1996) TV series – Ganesh Bihari
- Parampara (1993–1997) TV series – Dharam Chopra
- Aahat (1995) TV series Season 1 1995–2001 – Episode 82/83 The return (1 Episode only)
- Rahat (1995) TV series – Mr. Khanna
- Saans (1993–1997) TV series
- Amanat (1997–2002) TV series – Ahmed Khan
- Sansaar (2001–2002)
- Bhagyavidhata (2009–2011) TV series – Siddheshwar Sinha
- Tara (1993) TV series – Ashok Sehgal (1993–1995)
- Chunauti (1987) TV series
- Kahani Chandrakanta Ki (2011), Sahara One

=== Visual effects ===
- Cowman: The Uddered Avenger (2008) TV episode (digital effects artist)
- Pig Amok (2009) TV episode (digital effects artist)
- Sun Cow (2009) TV episode (digital effects artist)
- Doggelganger (2009) TV episode (digital effects artist)
- Save the Clams (2009) TV episode (digital effects artist)
- Back at the Barnyard (digital effects artist) (7 episodes, 2008–2009)

=== Director ===
- Raeeszada (1990)
- Barsaat Ki Raat (1998)
- Ghulami (1985) – Thakur

== Death ==
Bharat Kapoor died on 27 April 2026 at the age of 80 in Mumbai.
