= Kala Bazar =

- Theatrical poster
- Directed by: Vijay Anand
- Written by: Vijay Anand
- Produced by: Dev Anand
- Starring: Dev Anand; Waheeda Rehman; Nanda
- Music by: S. D. Burman
- Production company: Navketan Films
- Release date: 12 February 1960
- Running time: 163 minutes
- Country: India
- Language: Hindi

Kala Bazar (transl. Black market) is a 1960 Hindi-language crime noir film produced by Dev Anand for Navketan Films. Written and directed by Dev Anand's younger brother Vijay Anand, the film starred Dev Anand, Waheeda Rehman, Vijay Anand, Chetan Anand, Nanda, Rashid Khan, Madan Puri, Leela Chitnis, Mumtaz Begum and Helen. S.D. Burman composed the music, while the lyrics were penned by Shailendra.

It was noted for having several of Bollywood's stars in a cameo at the film premiere of Mother India (1957), and it was also the only film to star the three Anand brothers together.

== Plot ==
Raghuveer is a poor bus conductor who is fired from the job after getting into an argument with a passenger. With an ailing mother and two younger siblings to take care of, Raghuveer doesn't know how to provide for his family. When he passes by a cinema hall and sees Kalu selling movie tickets, he gets an idea. Seeing that as a good source of quick money, he too decides to black market movie tickets. But for that, he needs capital to start with. So he robs Advocate Desai of Rs. 5000 and soon sets his own network of black marketers outside all prominent cinema-halls of Bombay.

First, he works with Kalu and at the premiere of Mother India, their tickets sell faster and faster as more film stars arrive – they include Dilip Kumar, Guru Dutt, Geeta Dutt, Kishore Kumar, Raaj Kumar, Rajendra Kumar, Lata Mangeshkar, Sohrab Modi, Mohammed Rafi, Nargis, Nadira and Nimmi. Finally, he sells his last ticket for 100 rupees when one ticket cost only 2 rupees. Elated with his newfound business, Raghuveer and Kalu go from strength to strength, recruiting many poor and homeless thieves. When Ganesh dares to challenge him, Raghuveer beats him up. The next day, Ganesh agrees to work for Raghuveer. Now a wealthy man, Raghuveer buys a new, spacious flat for his family on Marine Drive. Things change when a group of students buy movie tickets from him. Alka finds out that her friends bought them in black, and tears the tickets as she hates black marketing. This has a great impact on Raghuveer and he gets attracted towards Alka, who is standing nearby and watching. She was in love with her boyfriend, Nand Kumar Chattopadhyay who promises her not to do it again. Smitten with Alka, Raghuveer starts to follow her. So, when Nand gets a scholarship and travels overseas, Alka's parents decide to take her to Ooty to take her mind off Nand. Raghuveer sees this as a perfect opportunity and gets on the same cabin as her family and attempts to woo Alka on their trip to Ooty, but in vain. He sings "Apni To Har Aah Ek Toofan Hai", trying to flirt with Alka, while the song itself was veiled as a prayer. He also helps to cure Alka's father's back pain with a massage and soon, he becomes friends with the family. Though he is unable to win Alka, his feelings towards her makes him a changed man and he gives up the path of black marketing.

All that taken care of, he sets out to romance Alka, but she resists and turns away his love when she lies that she is engaged to Nand. Heartbroken, Raghuveer returns to Bombay to continue his business, but his love for Alka has changed him. When he left Alka in Ooty, he promised that he would never do anything bad. Raghuveer tries to convince his partners to stop black marketing and get an honest job, but they all eventually go back to their bad deeds. Raghuveer continues to try and earn an honest living and to his surprise, he meets Alka one day in Bombay. Alka, meanwhile, also falls for Raghuveer, but hesitates to tell him. Finally, she writes a letter to Nand, telling him to forget her, because she loves Raghuveer. The latter is delighted and Alka tells him to come in the evening to talk to her parents. However, everything goes awry when she learns that Nand has returned. When Nand comes to her house, the two of them argue, but finally both concede that their "love" was just childishness. Now free to profess her love for Raghuveer, Alka goes to his house, only to learn that he has been arrested for black marketing. The movie takes a turn and the court case is with Advocate Desai. The court room drama is really engaging as it shows how the black marketers changed the kala bazaar to Safed Bazar and all the people working for Raghuveer, give their opinion which is his positive side. The movie ends with Dev Anand and Waheeda Rehman walking in the rain under a single umbrella.

== Cast ==
- Dev Anand as Raghuveer
- Waheeda Rehman as Alka Sinha
- Nargis (Cameo)
- Vijay Anand as Nand Kumar Chattopadhyay
- Chetan Anand as Advocate Desai
- Nanda as Sapna
- Helen as Dancer/Singer
- Madan Puri as Ganesh
- Rashid Khan as Kalu
- Kartar Singh as sikh man in the bank
- Leela Chitnis as Raghuveer's Mother
- Mumtaz Begum as Mrs. Sinha
- M. A. Latif as M. L. Sinha
- Sushil Kumar as Raghuveer's Brother
- Krishan Dhawan as Sapna's Boyfriend
- Amrit Pal as Raghuveer's Gang Member
- Kishore Sahu as Public Prosecutor
- Jagdish Raj as Black Marketeer of Ticket

== Critical response ==
Vijay Lokapally of The Hindu called Kala Bazar a "timeless classic".

== Soundtrack ==
The songs of the film are composed by S. D. Burman and lyrics are by Shailendra.

Film Song list is as follows:

Song	Singer	Raga
"Teri Dhoom Har Kahin"	Mohammed Rafi	
"Na Main Dhan Chahoon"	Geeta Dutt, Sudha Malhotra	
"Apni Toh Har Aah Ik"	Mohammed Rafi	
"Sanjh Dhali Dil Ki Lagi"	Asha Bhosle, Manna Dey	
"Khoya Khoya Chand Khula Aasmaan"	Mohammed Rafi	
"Sambhalo Sambhalo Apna Dil"	Asha Bhosle	
"Sach Huye Sapne Tere"	Asha Bhosle	Kafi (raga)
"Rimjhim Ke Tarane Leke Aayi"	Geeta Dutt, Mohammed Rafi	Pahadi
