= Sholay Aur Toofan =

Sholay Aur Toofan is a 1994 Hindi action film of Bollywood directed by N. Paryani and produced by Mohan T. Gehani. This film was released on 3 August 1994 under the banner of Devi Films. Anand–Milind were the music directors of the film.

== Plot ==
This is a revenge story of a girl named Radha. Radha, Sita and Geeta are three sisters who live in a village with their mother. Sita is envious of her sisters and joins a bad gang, whereas Geeta becomes a police officer. Radha is gang-raped by four goons who are powerful and have connections with the head of police. Radha kills Pandit, one of the rapists, and her sister Geeta comes to arrest Radha, but she escapes from the police with the help of one Khan Baba. She meets some girls in the jungle who have also been victimised by those goons. Radha leads them and they take up arms to take revenge their enemies.

== Cast ==
- Shakti Kapoor as Police Constable Kamlesh
- Rakesh Bedi as Pandit Kaushik
- Kiran Kumar as Khan Baba
- Goga Kapoor as Police Ofiicer Randhir Rai
- Bharat Kapoor as Gopal Verma
- Sripradha as Radha
- Ajit Vachani as Pranab
- Raaj Premi as Harshad
- Damini as Vinita

== Soundtrack ==
1. "Babu Na Kare Ishare" - Kavita Krishnamurthy
2. "Lootere Sun To Papi Hai" - Kavita Krishnamurthy
3. "Ramzan Ka Mahina" - Mohammed Aziz
4. "Sipaiya Ko Main Apna" - Dilraj Kaur
5. "Sun Le O Meri Radha" - Mohammed Aziz and Kavita Krishnamurthy
