= Saheb Bahadur =

Sahib Bahadur
- Poster
- Directed by: Chetan Anand
- Screenplay by: Chetan Anand
- Story by: Chetan Anand; Sujit Sen
- Produced by: Dev Anand
- Starring: Dev Anand; Priya Rajvansh
- Cinematography: Faredoon A. Irani
- Edited by: Jadhav Rao
- Music by: Madan Mohan
- Production company: Himalay Films
- Release date: November 9, 1977
- Country: India
- Language: Hindi

Sahib Bahadur is a 1977 Indian Hindi film directed by Chetan Anand.

== Plot ==
In a small town of Chamba (Himachal Pradesh), situated in a picturesque Indian valley, lives a corrupt Deputy collector, Hare Murari, an equally corrupt Police Superintendent, Pasupathi; a doctor; a Judge; and Professor Rampyare. These officials always ensure that no one gets anything done without their permission, thus ensuring that their palms are adequately greased. When a young man named Prem Pratap seeks a license for conducting a song and dance sequence, he too is asked to bribe them, which he does. Subsequently, Hare Murari finds out that Prem Pratap may be a Government Official who has come incognito to investigate and expose them. Hare Murari's and the others worst fears are realized when they find out that Prem has been speaking long distance with none other than the President of India. What follows is hilarious chaos as the officials come together to try and portray themselves as honest and law-abiding citizens.

== Cast ==
- Dev Anand as Prem Pratap, Government Officer
- Priya Rajvansh as Meena
- Om Prakash as Deputy Collector Hare Murari
- Durga Khote as Meena's grandmother
- Anil Dhawan as Officer under Prem Pratap (Guest Role in Last Scene)
- K. N. Singh as Police Superintendent Pashupati
- Asit Sen as Forest Officer Fakirchand
- Agha as Judge
- I. S. Johar as Professor Rampyare
- Raza Murad as Ajay
- Ajit as Ajay's father
- Sudhir as Ajay's partner
- G. Asrani as Aainu
- Tom Alter
- Bhagwan as Dy. Collector's assistant
- Dhumal as Charandas
- Preeti Ganguli as Vimla Murari
- Jankidas as Astrologer
- Bharat Kapoor as Doctor
- Manorama as Mrs. Hare Murari
- Keshto Mukherjee as Trumpet Player
- Mukri as Waiter
- Paintal as Madhav
- V.Gopal as Police Officer Totaram
- Sunder as Hotel Manager

== Soundtrack ==
All songs are composed by Madan Mohan and lyrics are penned by Rajinder Krishan.

#	Title	Artist(s)	Length
1	Tauba Tauba	Kishore Kumar	08:56
2	Raahi Tha Main Awaara	Kishore Kumar	06:07
3	Raat Ko Aayiyega	Kishore Kumar	04:38
4	Yeh Pyar Ka Nasha	Kishore Kumar, Mahendra Kapoor, Ambar Kumar, Chandru Atma, Lata Mangeshkar, Asha Bhosle	03:35
5	Mushkil Hai Jeena	Lata Mangeshkar	06:01
6	Hum Paapi Tu	Mahendra Kapoor, Ambar Kumar, Chandru Atma, Chandrani Mukherjee, Dilraj Kaur	04:44
7	Mushkil Hai Jeena (Revival)	Lata Mangeshkar	06:21
