= Vijay Anand (filmmaker) =

Indian film director and actor (1934–2004)

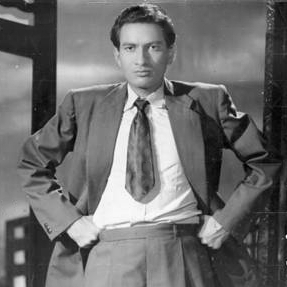
- Vijay Anand in Agra Road (1957)
- Born: 22 January 1934; Gurdaspur, Punjab, British India
- Died: 23 February 2004 (aged 70); Mumbai, Maharashtra, India
- Other name: Goldie
- Relatives: See Anand-Sahni family
- Awards: Filmfare Best Director Award:Guide (1965); Filmfare Best Dialogue Award: Guide (1965); Filmfare Best Editing Award: Johnny Mera Naam (1970)

Vijay Anand (22 January 1934 – 23 February 2004), also known as Goldie Anand, was an Indian filmmaker, producer, screenwriter, editor and actor, who is known for acclaimed films such as Guide (1965), Teesri Manzil (1966), Jewel Thief (1967) and Johny Mera Naam (1970). He made most of his films for the in-house banner Navketan Films and was part of the Anand family.

== Background and personal life ==
Vijay Anand was born in the British Raj on 22 January in Gurdaspur, Punjab, the son of Pishori Lal Anand, a successful and affluent advocate. He was the youngest of nine siblings. The producer and director Chetan Anand and the celebrated actor Dev Anand were his brothers, and among his sisters was Sheel Kanta Kapur, mother of film director Shekhar Kapur.

Vijay married his much younger niece, Sushma Kohli, the daughter of his older sister. This uncle-niece pairing is forbidden in much of Indian society and was a scandal when it happened. The couple married in the face of resistance from many quarters, not least their own families, but they had a happy marriage which lasted all their lives. They have a son together named Vaibhav Anand.

== Career ==
Though Vijay Anand has had a career as an actor, screenwriter, editor, and producer, he will primarily be remembered as a director. He made his directorial debut in 1957 superhit Nau Do Gyarah. The film, where Vijay's brother Dev Anand played the leading role, was shot in only 40 days.

Some of Vijay's other successful movies as a director are Kala Bazar (1960), Guide (1965), Teesri Manzil (1966), Jewel Thief (1967), Johny Mera Naam (1970), Tere Mere Sapne (1971), Ram Balram (1980) and Rajput (1982). Nearly all of these films were made by Navketan films, the production company started by the Anand brothers themselves. Notable exceptions wereTeesri Manzil, which was produced by Nasir Hussain," Ram-Balram" produced by Tony Juneja and "Rajput" produced by Mushir-Riaz.The period 1957-1970 must be reckoned the High Noon of Vijay Anand's career, as is evident from the films listed above. Vijay's 1965 film Guide starring Dev Anand and Waheeda Rehman, which was based on R. K. Narayan's novel of the same name, marked the acme of Vijay Anand's career. It was not only his biggest blockbuster but also his most critically acclaimed movie, celebrated by the masses, the classes and music-lovers alike. Navketan attempted an international release of an English-language remake of Guide, but without success.

Vijay Anand is known for his stylish song picturization, such as the numbers; "O Haseena Zulfonwali" (Teesri Manzil), "Aaj Phir Jeene Ki Tamanna Hai" (Guide) and "Honthon Mein Aisi Baat" (Jewel Thief).

He debuted as an actor with the film Agra Road (1957). As an actor, his most memorable roles were in the films like Kala Bazar (1960), Haqeeqat (1964), Kora Kagaz (1974), (in which he starred opposite Jaya Bachchan) and Main Tulsi Tere Aangan Ki (1978). Songless thriller film Chor Chor (1974), in which Leena Chandavarkar was his heroine. He acted in Ghungroo Ki Awaaz (1981) and Double Cross (1972) with Rekha as well as Chhupa Rustam (1973) and Tere Mere Sapne with Dev Anand, Hema Malini, and Mumtaz.

To the younger generation of the 1990s he is also known for playing detective Sam in the television series Tehkikaat (1994).

He served a short stint as the chairman of the Central Board of Film Certification, India's censor board, a position from which he resigned, in 2002, after he ran into ideological differences with the government over the introduction of ratings for adult movies.

Goldie, as he was affectionately called, died on 23 February 2004 due to a heart attack. He was aged 70.

== Filmography ==
=== Director ===
- Funtoosh (1956) - two songs "Ae Meri Topi Palatke Aa" and "Denewala jab bhi Detha"
- Nau Do Gyarah (1957)
- Kala Bazar (1960)
- Tere Ghar Ke Samne (1963)
- Guide (1965)
- Teesri Manzil (1966)
- Jewel Thief (1967)
- Kahin Aur Chal (1968)
- Johny Mera Naam (1970)
- Tere Mere Sapne (1971)
- Blackmail (1973)
- Chhupa Rustam (1973)
- Bullet (1976)
- Ek Do Teen Chaar (1980)
- Ram Balram (1980)
- Rajput (1982)
- Main Tere Liye (1988)

=== Writer ===
- Taxi Driver (1954)
- Hum Dono (1961)
- Raja (1972) - Story credits

=== Actor ===
- Funtoosh (1956) - a struggling writer
- Agra Road (1957) - Sunil
- Kala Bazar (1960) - Nand Kumar Chattopadhyay
- Tere Ghar Ke Saamne (1963) - Man in Qutub Minar
- Haqeeqat (1964) - Major Pratap Singh
- Tere Mere Sapne (1971) - Dr. Jagannath Kothari
- Double Cross (1972) - Ajay Arya / Vijay Arya / Jimmy
- Chhupa Rustam (1973) - Jimmy Fernandes
- Kora Kagaz (1974) - Professor Sukesh Dutt
- Chor Chor (1974) - Bank Manager, Aakash
- Main Tulsi Tere Aangan Ki (1978) - Thakur Rajnath Singh Chouhan
- Ghungroo Ki Awaaz (1981) - Thakur Ranjeet Singh

== Television ==
- Tehkikaat (1994) - Sam D'Silva

== Legacy ==
Sriram Raghavan's Johnny Gaddar, a Film noir style thriller is dedicated to his influence on the Hindi noir/thriller genre. It also pays tribute to him in a scene in which his movie Johny Mera Naam is being watched by a character and there he takes the name johnny to hide his identity. In another scene, an actor is shown reading the book, The Guide, a reference to one of the most famous films directed by him.

A retrospective of his films was held at International Film Festival of India (IFFI), held at Goa in 2007.

His film Guide has been studied and analyzed by several writers and thinkers. The book Guide the Film Perspectives has an in-depth study on the genius of the director running through the film. He also acted in television serial tehqiqat on Delhi doordarshan.

== Awards ==
- Filmfare Award for Best Director for Guide (1965)
- Filmfare Award for Best Dialogue for Guide (1965)
- Filmfare Award for Best Screenplay for Johnny Mera Naam (1970)
- Filmfare Award for Best Editing for Johnny Mera Naam (1970)
- BFJA Awards as Best Editor for Johnny Mera Naam (1970)
- BFJA Awards as Best Editor for Double Cross (1972)
