= Chetan Anand (director) =

Hindi film producer, screenwriter and director (1921–1997)

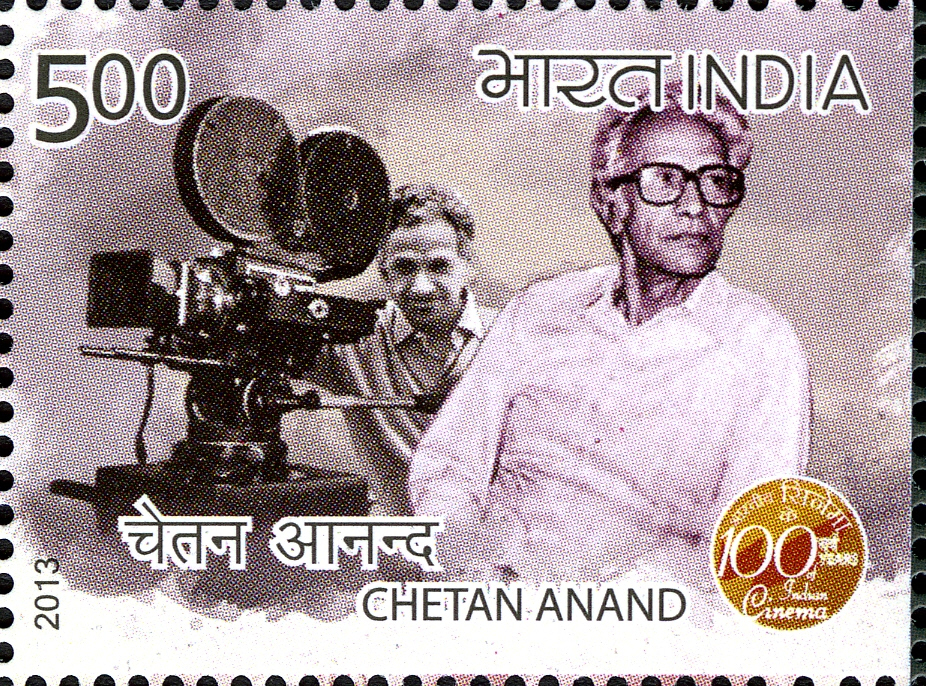
- Chetan Anand on a 2013 stamp of India
- Born: 3 January 1915; Lahore, Punjab, British India (present-day Lahore, Pakistan)
- Died: 6 July 1997 (aged 76); Mumbai, Maharashtra, India
- Occupations: Producer, director, actor, screenwriter
- Years active: 1944–1994
- Spouse: Uma Anand (m. 1943)
- Partner: Priya Rajvansh
- Children: 2; Ketan Anand and Vivek Anand
- Relatives: See Anand-Sahni family Anand family
- Awards: Cannes Film Festival: Palme d'Or (Best Film): Neecha Nagar (1946)

Chetan Anand (3 January 1915 – 6 July 1997) was a Bollywood film producer, screenwriter and director from India, whose first film, Neecha Nagar, was awarded the Grand Prix Prize (now Golden Palm) at the first ever Cannes Film Festival in 1946. Later, he co-founded Navketan Films with his younger brother Dev Anand in 1949.

== Biography ==
=== Early life ===
Anand was born on 3 January 1921 in Lahore, then India, to a well-to-do advocate, Pishori Lal Anand. He went to Gurukul Kangri Vishwavidyalaya to study Hindu scriptures and graduated in English from Government College Lahore. His classmates included Balraj Sahni and Khushwant Singh. In college, he started taking an active interest in theatre, also composing poetry and editing the Hindi college journal. He remained a member of Indian National Congress in the 1930s, subsequently worked for the BBC and taught at the Doon School in Dehradun for a while, before going to Bombay to sell a film script.

=== Career ===
In the early 1940s, while he was teaching history, he wrote a film script on king Ashoka, which he showed to the director Phani Majumdar in Bombay. Anand failed to qualify for the Indian Civil Service (ICS) exams in London. As luck would have it, Majumdar cast him as a lead in his Hindi film, Rajkumar, released in 1944. He also became associated with the Indian People's Theatre Association (IPTA) in Bombay.Sahir was a member of IPTA and also the Progressive Writer's Association

He soon took to film direction with the well-acclaimed movie Neecha Nagar which won the Palme d'Or award at Cannes in 1946. It was the first film for Kamini Kaushal, became the first Indian film to gain international recognition and was the debut of Pandit Ravi Shankar.

By the early 1950s, he and his younger brother Dev Anand had set up Navketan Productions in Bombay present day Mumbai. Afsar, starring Dev Anand and Suraiya, was the first film made by Navketan, which turned out to be a moderate success. It was followed by Taxi Driver and Aandhiyan, both of which he directed for Navketan Films.

While he made his reputation as a director, Anand kept on acting too occasionally. He appeared in Humsafar made in 1953. In 1957, he directed two movies Arpan and Anjali, in which he played lead roles too. He went on to act in Kala Bazar, Kinare-Kinare, Aman, Kanch Aur Heera and Hindustan Ki Kasam, which he also directed.

Chetan Anand started his own production company called Himalaya films with photographer Jal Mistry, music director Madan Mohan, lyrics writer Kaifi Azmi and the actress Priya Rajvansh. Together, they made films including Haqeeqat, Heer Raanjha, Hanste Zakhm and Hindustan Ki Kasam.

Chetan Anand is the film-maker who "discovered" Rajesh Khanna from an acting competition. Rajesh Khanna had his first break and was cast by Chetan Anand in the film Aakhri Khat, although G. P. Sippy's "Raaz" introducing Rajesh Khanna and Babita was the first "released" film for Rajesh Khanna. Aakhri Khat is known for its beautiful locations, songs penned by Kaifi Aazmi, composed by Khayyam, the beautiful lady Indrani Mukherjee and the child star Bunty. Bunty and the music were the main attractions of this film. Anand later directed Khanna in the film Kudrat, based on the theme of reincarnation.

Apart from 17 feature films, he is also known for the acclaimed television serial, Param Veer Chakra, which was abroadcast by Doordarshan in 1988.

=== Personal life ===
In 1943, Chetan Anand married Uma Chatterji, a Bengali Christian woman of Brahmin heritage. Her father, Gyanesh Chandra Chatterji, was the principal of Government Law College, Lahore, and he was the son of Rev. Probhat Chandra Chatterji, a Christian priest. Her mother, Ila Chatterji, was a first cousin of Mona Singha, better known as Kalpana Kartik, wife of Chetan's younger brother Dev Anand. Kalpana Kartik's father and Uma's maternal grandmother were brother and sister. Also, Uma was a sister of the Pakistani Bharatanatyam dancer, Indu Mitha.

Chetan Anand and Uma quickly became the parents of two sons, Ketan and Vivek, but they separated within a few years and she became the companion of Ebrahim Alkazi, a Muslim theatre professional. Until 1956, it was legally impossible for Hindus (and nearly impossible for Christians) to obtain a divorce. Therefore, despite open adultery, the couple remained legally married to each other.

In the 1960s, many years after being estranged from his wife, Chetan Anand fell in love with Priya Rajvansh, who had made her debut as heroine of his film Haqeeqat. The two fell in love during the making of this film, and their relationship lasted all their lives. Priya Rajvansh worked in every single film made by Anand beginning with Haqeeqat, and more surprisingly, she did not work in a single film made by anyone else. Since Anand was a legally married man, the two were unable to formalize their relationship, and they had no children together.

Chetan Anand died aged 76 on 6 July 1997 in Mumbai. He bequeathed a sizable portion of his wealth to Priya Rajvansh. This included the right of lifelong residence in his sprawling beachfront bungalow in Ruia Park, Juhu, Mumbai, where real estate is among the most expensive in India. She was given no right to sell the property, which would revert to Anand's sons upon her death; the arrangement was made because Priya Rajvansh and Anand had no children together, and this would enable her to live her whole life in the house that she had shared with him for two decades, while not depriving his sons of this valuable piece of real estate.

On 27 March 2000, three years after his death, Priya Rajvansh was murdered in the same beachfront bungalow. Both of Anand's sons, Ketan and Vivek, were arrested for the murder. They were convicted and given the sentence of life imprisonment. However, they were granted bail after spending two years in jail.

== Legacy ==
Chetan Anand: The Poetics of Film, a book written by his wife Uma Anand and son Ketan Anand (Himalaya Films Media Entertainment), was released in 2006. A documentary by the same name made by Ketan Anand was released in 2008.

A retrospective of his films was held at the Stuttgart Film Festival and at the India International Centre, New Delhi in 2007.

== Filmography ==
=== Director ===
Films

- Neecha Nagar (1946)
- Afsar (1950)
- Aandhiyan (1952)
- Taxi Driver (1954)
- Funtoosh (1956)
- Arpan (1957)
- Kinare Kinare (1963)
- Haqeeqat (1964)
- Aakhri Khat (1966)
- Heer Raanjha (1970)
- Hanste Zakhm (1973)
- Hindustan Ki Kasam (1973)
- Jaaneman (1976)
- Saheb Bahadur (1977)
- Kudrat (1981)
- Haathon Ki Lakeeren (1986)

TV series

- Param Veer Chakra (1988)

=== Producer ===
- Saheb Bahadur (1977)
- Haathon Ki Lakeeren (1986)

=== Actor ===
- Kala Bazar (1960) as Advocate Desai
- Arpan (1957)
- Kinare Kinare (1963) as Puran
- Aman (film) (1967) as Dr. Akhira

== Awards ==
- 1946: Palme d'Or (Best Film), Cannes Film Festival: Neecha Nagar
- 1965: National Film Award for Second Best Feature Film: Haqeeqat
- 1982: Filmfare Best Story Award: Kudrat
