= Ghazal (1964 film) =

1964 film

Gazal
- Directed by: Ved-Madan
- Screenplay by: Agha Jani Kashmiri; Majnu Lucknowi (dialogue)
- Produced by: Ved-Madan
- Starring: Sunil Dutt; Meena Kumari; Rehman; Prithviraj Kapoor
- Cinematography: Jagdish Chadha
- Edited by: Prabhakar Gokhale
- Music by: Madan Mohan; Sahir Ludhianvi (lyrics)
- Production company: Natraj Productions
- Release date: 1964
- Running time: 129 minutes
- Country: India
- Language: Urdu

Gazal is a 1964 Urdu romance musical film directed by Ved-Madan, starring Sunil Dutt, Meena Kumari and Prithviraj Kapoor. The muslim social film is about the right of young generation to the marriage of their choice. It had music by Madan Mohan with lyrics by Sahir Ludhianvi, featuring notable filmi-ghazals such as "Rang Aur Noor Ki Baraat", performed by Mohammed Rafi and "Naghma O Sher Ki Saugaat", performed by Lata Mangeshkar.

== Plot ==
Set in Agra, the film is the story of Ejaz (Sunil Dutt), who is editor of Inquilab. When he listens to Naaz Ara Begum (Meena Kumari) sing, he falls deeply in love with her. However, he soon loses his job. Ejaz and Naaz manage to meet secretly, with help of Naaz's sister Kausar. This relationship has many people going angry, first Nawab Bakar Ali Khan (Prithviraj Kapoor) her father who wants Naaz to marry Akhtar Nawab (Rehman), her paternal cousin.

== Cast & Characters ==
Character	Portrayed By
Ejaz	Sunil Dutt
Naaz Ara Begum	Meena Kumari
Akhtar Nawab	Rehman
Dr. Nawab Mehmood Ali Khan	Rajendra Nath
Kausar Ara Begum	Nazima
Babuji	Raj Mehra
Courtesan (in song "Yun Bhi Hai")	Minoo Mumtaz
Mridula Rani	Mrs. Bakar Ali Khan
Ejaz's Mother	Pratima Devi
Ejaz's Dad	Mohsin Abdullah
Nawab Bakar Ali Khan	Prithviraj Kapoor

== Music ==
There are 3 songs with the same radif: Kise Pesh Karoon — Naghma-o-Sher Ki Saugaat Kise Pesh Karoon (Lata), Ishq Ki Garmi-e-Jazbaat Kise Pesh Karoon (Rafi) and Rang Aur Noor Ki Baaraat Kise Pesh Karoon (Rafi). The first two are happy songs, while the last one is a sad song. The last stanzas of the first two songs are identical.

Songs List:-

1. Naghma O Sher Ki Saugaat Kise Pesh Karun - Lata Mangeshkar
2. Ishq Ki Garmiye Jazbaat Kise Pesh Karun - Mohammed Rafi
3. Unse Nazrein Mili - Lata Mangeshkar, Minoo Purshottam, Chorus
4. Dil Khush Hai Aaj - Mohammed Rafi
5. Mujhe Yeh Phool Na De - Suman Kalyanpur, Mohammed Rafi
6. Ada Qatil Nazar Barke - Asha Bhosle
7. Rang Aur Noor Ki Baraat Kise Pesh Karun - Mohammed Rafi
8. Taj Tere Liye Ek Mazhar-e-Ulfat ... Mere Mehboob Kahin Aur - Mohammed Rafi

The song "Naghma O Sher Ki Saugaat" is set in the Hindustani raga Bhimpalasi.
