= Balraj Sahni =

Indian film and stage actor (1913–1973)

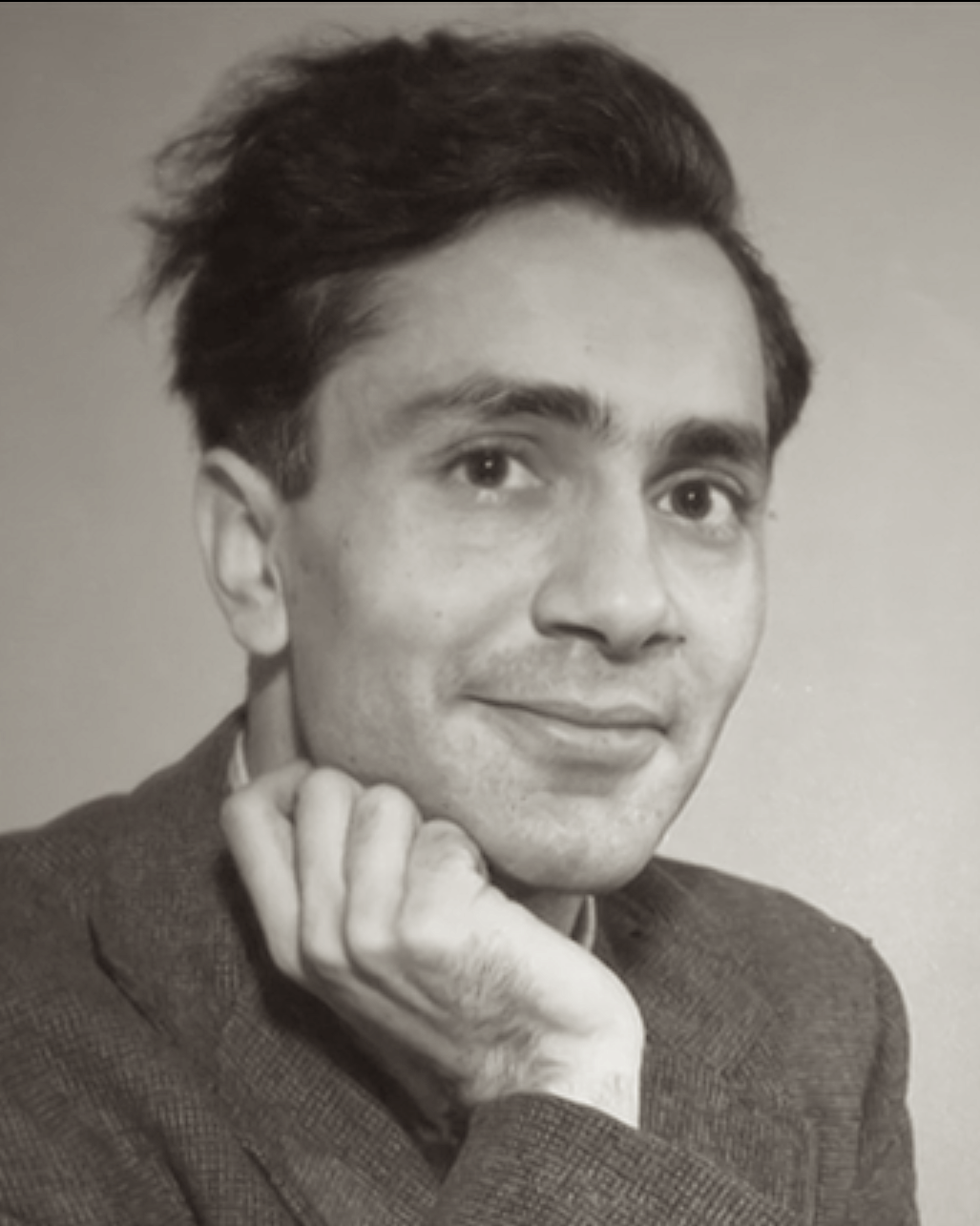
- Balraj Sahni in London c.1941
- Born: Yudhishthir Sahni; 1 May 1913; Rawalpindi, Punjab, British India (present-day Punjab, Pakistan)
- Died: 13 April 1973 (aged 59); Bombay, Maharashtra, India
- Occupations: Actor, writer
- Years active: 1946–1973
- Political party: Communist Party of India
- Spouse(s): Damayanti Sahni (m. 1936; died 1947) Santosh Chandhok (m. 1951)
- Children: 3, including Parikshit Sahni
- Relatives: Bhisham Sahni (brother)
- Family: Anand–Sahni family
- Honors: Padma Shri (1969)

Balraj Sahni (born Yudhishthir Sahni; 1 May 1913 – 13 April 1973) was an Indian film and stage actor, who is best known for Dharti Ke Lal (1946), Hum Log (1951), Do Bigha Zameen (1953), Chhoti Bahen (1959), Kabuliwala (1961), Waqt (1965) and Garm Hava (1973). He was the brother of Bhisham Sahni, the Hindi writer, playwright, and actor. He won a Filmfare Special Award for outstanding contribution to Indian films in 1970.

== Early life ==
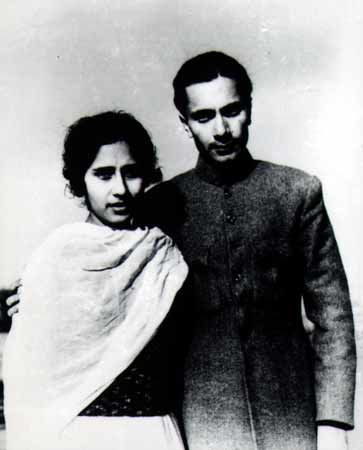
Balraj Sahni with his wife Damayanti, 1936.

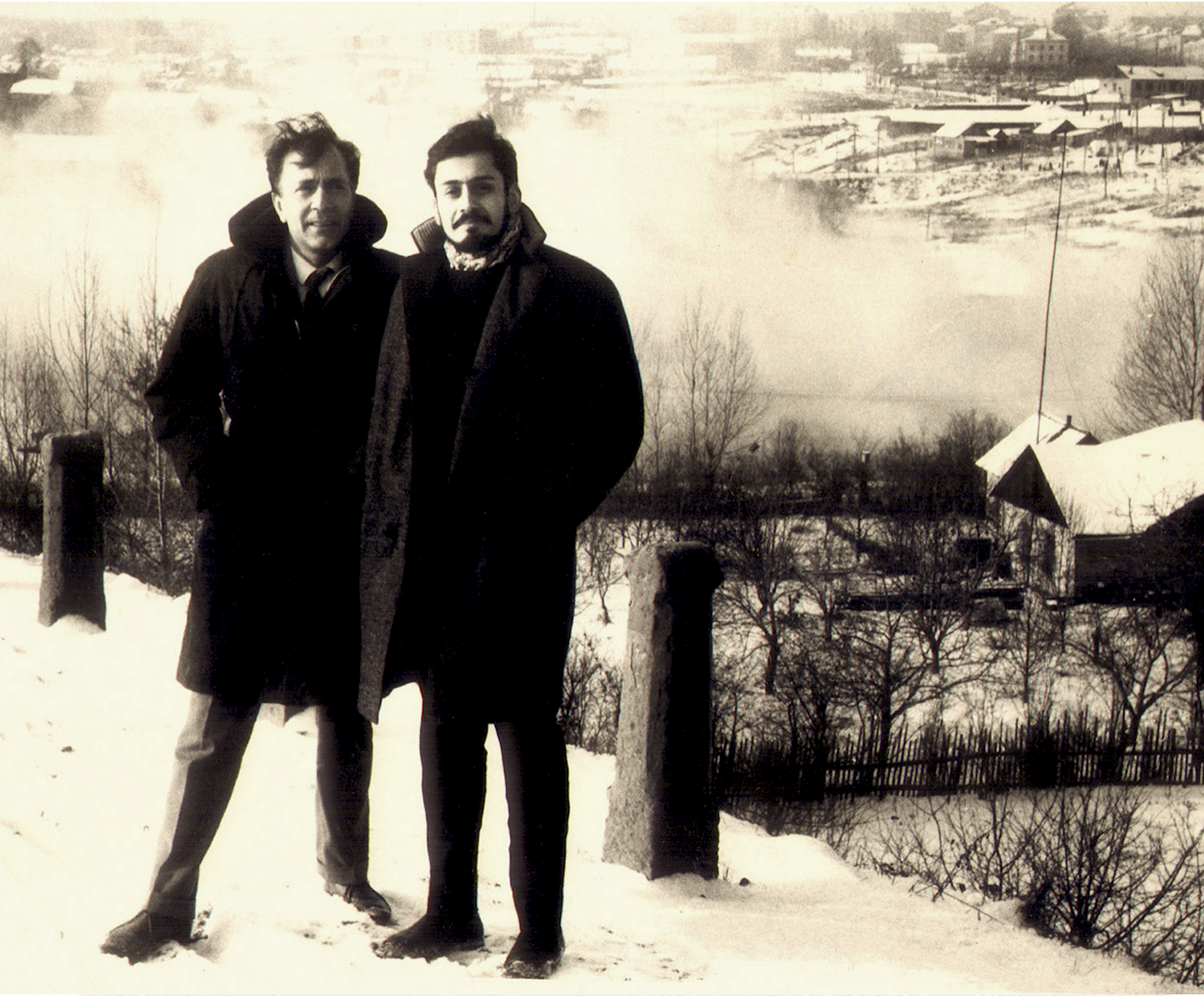
Balraj Sahni and son Parikshit Sahni, Moscow c. 1965.

Sahni was born on 1 May 1913 in Rawalpindi, British Punjab (present-day Punjab, Pakistan) into a Punjabi Hindu family. His father belonged to the Arya Samaj organization, a Hindu reformist movement, and stressed the importance of social reforms as well the independence movement also admiring individuals such as Gandhi and Tagore, which would instill an early idealism in the mind of Sahni. His son Parikshit Sahni would say that, later in his life, Sahni would keep such idealism but with a non-religious approach, as he'd identify with Marxism and declare himself an atheist.

He studied at Government College, Lahore and Gordon College, Rawalpindi. After completing his master's degree in English Literature from Lahore, he went back to Rawalpindi and joined his family business. He also held a bachelor's degree in Hindi. Soon after, he married Damayanti Sahni.

In the late 1930s, Sahni and his wife left Rawalpindi to join Tagore's Visva-Bharati University in Shantiniketan in Bengal as an English and Hindi teacher. It is here that their son, Parikshit Sahni was born, when his wife Damayanti was earning her bachelor's degree. He also collaborated with Mahatma Gandhi for a year in 1938. The next year, Sahni, with Gandhi's blessings, went to England to join the BBC-London's Hindi service as a radio announcer. He returned to India in 1943, and his wife died in 1947 at age 26. In 1951, he remarried, to writer Santosh Chandhok; they remained married until his death in 1973. While at the BBC, Sahni worked alongside George Orwell.

== Career ==
Sahni was always interested in acting, and started his acting career with the plays of the Indian People's Theatre Association (IPTA). Incidentally, his wife Damayanti became well known as an IPTA actress much before Sahni made a name for himself in films. He started his film career in Bombay with the film Insaaf (1946), followed by Dharti Ke Lal directed by Khwaja Ahmad Abbas in 1946, Damayanti's first film, Door Chalein in 1946, and other films. But it was in 1953, with Bimal Roy's classic Do Bigha Zamin, that his true strength as an actor was first recognised. The film won the international prize at the Cannes Film Festival.

He followed it up with an encore in the 1961 classic Kabuliwala penned by Tagore.

Sahni's wife Damayanti, who was the heroine of his 1947 film Gudia, died at a young age that same year. Two years later, he married his first cousin, Santosh Chandhok, later known as an author and television writer.

He acted opposite heroines such as Padmini, Nutan, Meena Kumari, Vyjayanthimala and Nargis in films such as Bindya, Seema (1955), Sone Ki Chidiya (1958), Sutta Bazaar (1959), Bhabhi Ki Chudiyaan (1961), Kathputli (1957), Lajwanti (1958) and Ghar Sansar (1958). His character roles in films such as Neelkamal (1968), Ghar Ghar Ki Kahani (1970), Do Raaste (1969) and Ek Phool Do Mali (1969) were well received. However, he is perhaps best remembered by the current generation for his picturisation of the legendary song "Ae Meri Zohra Jabeen" from the movie Waqt (1965). Sahni appeared opposite Achala Sachdev in the number.

He also starred in the classic Punjabi film Nanak Dukhiya Sub Sansar (1970) as well as the critically acclaimed Satluj De Kande.

His role as the angst-ridden, but stoic Muslim man who refuses to go to Pakistan during partition, in his last film Garam Hawa, has often been called his best performance by critics. Balraj, however, could not see the completed film to rate his own performance, as he died the day after he finished dubbing work. The last line he recorded for the film, and hence his last recorded line is Hindustani: "Insaan Kab Tak Akela Jee Sakta Hai?" which can be translated to English as: "How long can a man live alone?"

== Later life ==
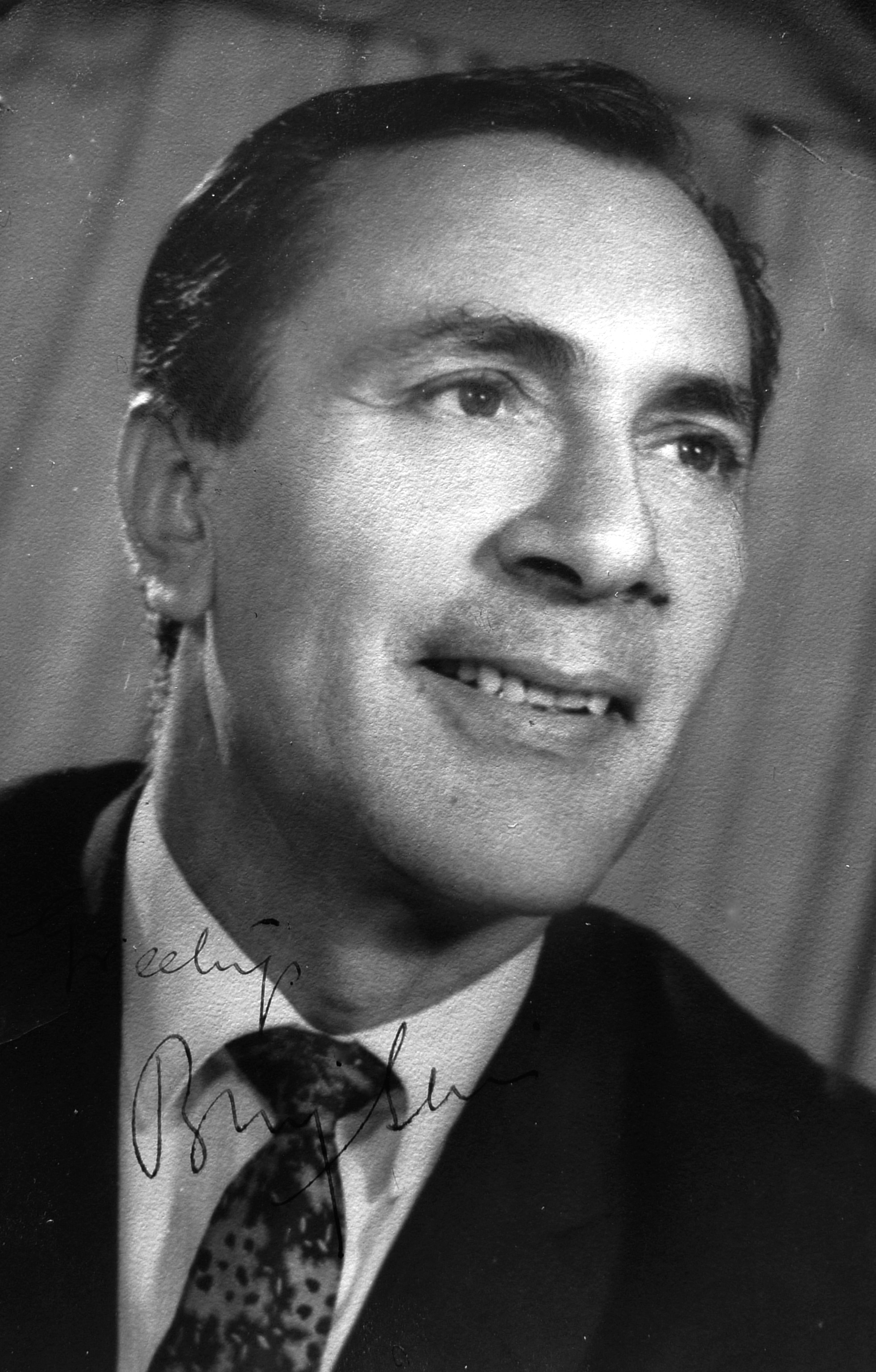
Balraj Sahni in 1969

Sahni was a gifted writer; his early writings were in English, though later in life he switched to Punjabi, and became a writer of repute in Punjabi literature. In 1960, after a visit to Pakistan, he wrote Mera Pakistani Safarnama. His book Mera Rusi Safarnama, which he had written after a tour of the erstwhile Soviet Union in 1969, earned him the Soviet Land Nehru Award. He contributed many poems and short stories in magazines and also penned his autobiography; Meri Filmi Aatmakatha. Sahni was an extremely well-read and politically conscious person.

He and P. K. Vasudevan Nair worked on the idea of All India Youth Federation with firebrand Delhi communist, Comrade Guru Radha Kishan to organise the first national conference of AIYF in Delhi. Their wholehearted efforts were visible as more than 250 delegates and observers representing several youth organisations of various states of India attended this session. Balraj Sahni was elected as the first president of All India Youth Federation, the youth wing of Communist Party of India. The organisation was a huge success and strong presence of the organisation was noticed by other political groups and the senior communist leaders everywhere.

Sahni also dabbled in screenwriting; he wrote the 1951 film Baazi which starred Dev Anand and was directed by Guru Dutt. He was also a recipient of the Padma Shri Award (1969). Balraj Sahni also wrote in Punjabi and contributed to the Punjabi magazine Preetlari. In the 1950s he inaugurated the Library and Study Centre for the underprivileged in Delhi.

His acting in Do Bigha Zameen (1953) and Garam Hawa (1973) were the highlights of his career. He believed in what is known as neo-realistic cinema.

Balraj's brother Bhisham Sahni was a well-known writer who wrote the novel Tamas. His son Parikshit Sahni is also an actor. Balraj Sahni died on 13 April 1973 of a massive cardiac arrest, at age 59. He had been depressed for some time by the untimely death of his young daughter, Shabnam; she died a year earlier.

Punjabi Kala Kender, founded in 1973 at Bombay by Balraj Sahni, gives away the annual Balraj Sahni Award, also given by the All India Artists Association.

== Filmography ==
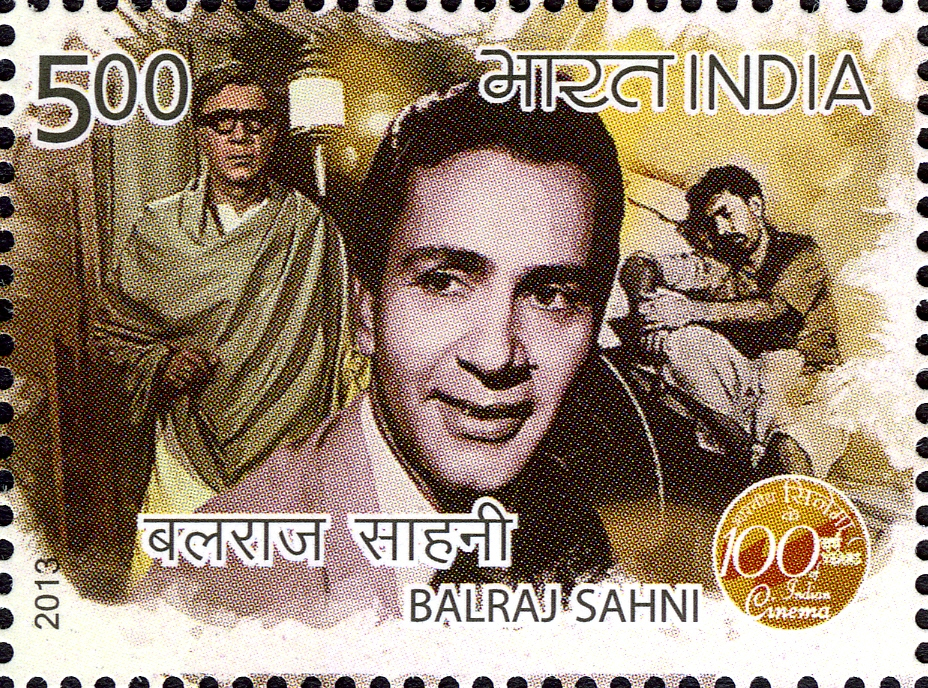
Sahni on a 2013 stamp of India

| Year | Title | Role | Notes |
|---|---|---|---|
| 1946 | Insaaf | | Debut film |
| 1946 | Dharti Ke Lal | Niranjan | |
| 1946 | Door Chalen | | |
| 1946 | Badnami | | |
| 1947 | Gudia | | |
| 1948 | Gunjan | | |
| 1951 | Maaldar | | |
| 1951 | Hum Log | Raj | |
| 1951 | Hulchul | The Jailer | |
| 1952 | Badnam | | |
| 1953 | Akash | | |
| 1953 | Rahi | Doctor | |
| 1953 | Do Bigha Zamin | Shambhu Maheto | |
| 1953 | Chalis Baba Ek Chor | | |
| 1953 | Bhagyawan | | |
| 1954 | Majboori | | |
| 1954 | Aulad | | |
| 1954 | Bazooband | Surajmal | |
| 1955 | Tangewali | | |
| 1955 | Seema | Ashok "Babuji" | |
| 1955 | Joru Ka Bhai | | |
| 1955 | Jawab | Dayal | |
| 1955 | Garam Coat | Girdharilal "Girdhari" | |
| 1956 | Taksaal | Jatin Mukherjee | |
| 1956 | Era Bator Sur | | Assamese film |
| 1957 | Krishna Sudama | | |
| 1957 | Pardesi | Sakharam | Dubbed and colorized in Russian with the title Khozhdenie Za Tri Moray |
| 1957 | Mai Baap | Chandan | |
| 1957 | Lal Batti | | Also Director |
| 1957 | Kath Putli | Loknath | |
| 1957 | Do Roti | Shyam "Masterji" | |
| 1957 | Bhabhi | Ratan | |
| 1958 | Sone Ki Chidiya | Shrikant | |
| 1958 | Naya Kadam | | |
| 1958 | Lajwanti | Nirmal Kumar | |
| 1958 | Khazanchi | Radhe Mohan | |
| 1958 | Ghar Sansar | Kailash | |
| 1958 | Ghar Grihasti | | |
| 1958 | Devar Bhabhi | | |
| 1959 | Chand | Mr. Kapoor | |
| 1959 | Black Cat | Agent Rajan | |
| 1959 | Satta Bazaar | Ramesh | |
| 1959 | Heera Moti | Dhuri | |
| 1959 | Chhoti Bahen | Rajendra | |
| 1959 | C.I.D. Girl | Mohan | |
| 1960 | Dil Bhi Tera Hum Bhi Tere | Panchu | |
| 1960 | Anuradha | Dr. Nirmal Chaudhary | |
| 1960 | Nai Maa | | |
| 1960 | Bindya | Devraj | |
| 1961 | Bhabhi Ki Chudiyan | Shyam | |
| 1961 | Sapne Suhane | Shankar | |
| 1961 | Suhag Sindoor | Ramu | |
| 1961 | Kabuliwala | Abdul Rehman Khan | |
| 1962 | Shaadi | Ratan R. Malhotra | |
| 1962 | Anpadh | Choudhary Shambhunath | |
| 1963 | Akela | | |
| 1964 | Satluj De Kande | Ram Praksh Malhotra | Punjabi Film |
| 1964 | Haqeeqat | Major Ranjit Singh | |
| 1964 | Main Bhi Ladki Hoon | Ganga | |
| 1964 | Punar Milan | Dr. Mohan / Ram | |
| 1965 | Dak Ghar | Andhe Baba | |
| 1965 | Waqt | Lala Kedarnath | |
| 1965 | Faraar | Detective Officer | |
| 1966 | Aaye Din Bahar Ke | Shukla | |
| 1966 | Pinjre Ke Panchhi | Yaseen Khan | |
| 1966 | Neend Hamari Khwab Tumhare | Khan Bahadur | |
| 1966 | Laadla | Barrister Brij Mohan | |
| 1966 | Aasra | Surendranath Kumar | |
| 1967 | Hamraaz | Police Inspector Ashok | |
| 1967 | Naunihaal | Principal | |
| 1967 | Ghar Ka Chirag | | |
| 1967 | Aman | Gautamdas' father | |
| 1968 | Izzat | Thakur Pratap Singh | |
| 1968 | Sunghursh | Ganeshi Prasad | |
| 1968 | Neel Kamal | Mr. Raichand | |
| 1968 | Duniya | Public Prosecutor Ramnath Sharma | |
| 1969 | Ek Phool Do Mali | Kailashnath Kaushal | |
| 1969 | Do Raaste | Navendu Gupta | |
| 1969 | Talash | Ranjit Rai | |
| 1969 | Nanha Farishta | Dr. Ramnath | |
| 1969 | Hum Ek Hain | | |
| 1970 | Nanak Dukhiya Sab Sansar | Subedar Varyam Singh | |
| 1970 | Holi Ayee Re | Thakur Mangal Singh | |
| 1970 | Mere Humsafar | Ashok | |
| 1970 | Pehchan | Ex-Firefighter | |
| 1970 | Pavitra Paapi | Pannalal | |
| 1970 | Naya Raasta | Bansi | |
| 1970 | Ghar Ghar Ki Kahani | Shankarnath | |
| 1970 | Dharti | Inspector General Chandrashekhar (Bharat's Father) | |
| 1971 | Paraya Dhan | Govindram | |
| 1971 | Jawan Mohabbat | Dr. Naresh Sareen | |
| 1972 | Jawani Diwani | Ravi Anand | |
| 1972 | Jangal Mein Mangal | Thomas | |
| 1972 | Shayar-e-Kashmir Mahjoor | Ghulam Ahmed Mahjoor | |
| 1972 | Mangetar | | |
| 1973 | Chimni Ka Dhuan | | |
| 1973 | Pyaar Ka Rishta | Ashok | |
| 1973 | Hindustan Ki Kasam | | |
| 1973 | Hanste Zakhm | S.P. Dinanath Mahendru | |
| 1973 | Daman Aur Aag | Shanker | |
| 1973 | Garam Hava | Salim Mirza | |
| 1977 | Amaanat | Suresh | |
| 1977 | Jallian Wala Bagh | Udham Singh | (final film role) |

== Works ==
- Balraj Sahni: An Autobiography, by Balraj Sahni. Published by Hind Pocket Books. [Meri Filmi Aatmakatha in Hindi]
- Mera Pakistani Safarnama (Punjabi), 1960.
- Mera Russi Safarnama (Punjabi), 1969.
- Kamey (Labourers) (Punjabi)
- Ek Safar Ek Daastaan (Punjabi)
- Gair Jazbaati Diary (Punjabi)
