= Madhubala filmography =

Madhubala (born Mumtaz Jahan Begum Dehlavi; 14 February 1933 – 23 February 1969) was an Indian actress and producer who appeared in 72 films during a career spanning from the early 1940s to the mid-1960s. She made her debut at the age of nine in an uncredited role in Basant (1942). In 1944, she signed a contract with Ranjit Studios, under which she featured in minor roles for the next two years. Upon the contract's expiration in 1947, director Kidar Sharma cast Madhubala as the leading lady in the drama Neel Kamal. The film was a commercial failure but garnered her critical praise, and she subsequently rose to prominence with the drama Lal Dupatta (1948) and the horror film Mahal (1949), which was one of the biggest box office successes of the decade. Madhubala then starred in a string of successful productions, including Dulari (1949), Beqasoor (1950), Badal (1951), Tarana (1951) and Sangdil (1952), frequently collaborating with actors Dev Anand, Dilip Kumar, and Prem Nath.

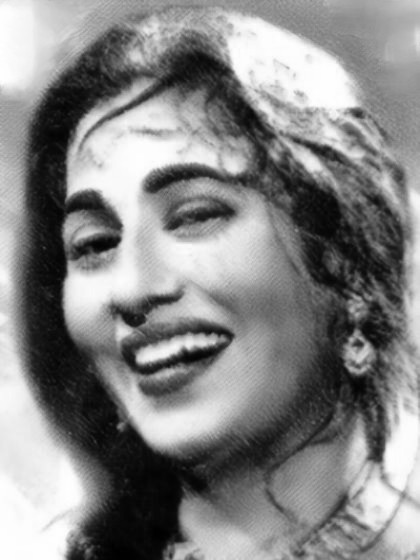
Madhubala (1933–1969)

During this period, Madhubala ventured into film production with Pardes (1950) and Rail Ka Dibba (1953) in collaboration with Prem Narayan Arora. In 1953, along with her father Ataullah Khan, she co-founded the production company, Madhubala Private Ltd. She subsequently starred in two high-profile productions: S. S. Vasan's fantasy film Bahut Din Huwe and Mehboob Khan's drama Amar (both 1954), and debuted as an independent producer with the drama Naata (1955), in which she also acted. However, their collective commercial failure led segments of the press to label her "box office poison". Madhubala's career took a turning point when she played a modern heiress in Guru Dutt's comedy Mr. & Mrs. '55 (1955), a satire on marriage of convenience. The film's critical and commercial success dismantled her "tragic heroine" typecasting, and cemented her status as a versatile performer. She then advanced her career by performing a wider variety of roles in the period films Raj Hath and Shirin Farhad (both 1956), the black comedy Gateway of India and the drama Ek Saal (both 1957).

Madhubala's popularity soared in the late 1950s and she received critical praise for a series of films which often co-starred actors Kishore Kumar, Dev Anand, and Bharat Bhushan. She portrayed an intrepid journalist in the thriller Kala Pani (1958), an Anglo-Indian cabaret dancer in the film noir Howrah Bridge (1958), a socialite in the comedy Chalti Ka Naam Gaadi (1958), and a romantic lead in the musical Barsat Ki Rat (1960). These films, along with Phagun (1958), Jhumroo (1961), Boy Friend (1961) and Half Ticket (1962), ranked among the highest-grossing productions of their respective years. Madhubala earned widespread critical acclaim for her performance as the doomed court dancer Anarkali in K. Asif's historical epic Mughal-e-Azam (1960). She won the Best Actress award from the Film Journalists' Association of Bombay, and also earned a nomination in the same category at Filmfare. In the 21st century, Mughal-e-Azam is frequently cited as one of the best films ever made, and holds the distinction of being the highest-grossing Indian film of all time when adjusted for inflation.

Although Mughal-e-Azam established Madhubala as a pop icon, its taxing multi-year production severely worsened her congenital heart condition. Her health declined rapidly in the 1960s, and she reduced her workload after producing Mehlon Ke Khwab (1960) and Pathan (1962). Her final completed project, Sharabi, was released in 1964 following several delays. Jwala (1971), her only film shot entirely in colour, was released two years after her death. It was completed using body doubles and marked her final screen appearance.

== Filmography ==
Film titles are listed alphabetically within each year.

=== As an actor ===
Year	Title	Role(s)	Notes	Ref(s)
1942	Basant	Manju	Uncredited	
1944	Mumtaz Mahal	—	Child actor Credited as "Baby Mumtaz"	
1945	Dhanna Bhagat	—	Child actor Credited as "Baby Mumtaz"	
1946	Phoolwari	—	Child actor Credited as "Baby Mumtaz"	
1946	Pujari	—	Child actor Credited as "Baby Mumtaz"	
1946	Rajputani	—	Child actor Credited as "Baby Mumtaz"	
1947	Chittor Vijay	Sobhagya Devi	Lost film	
1947	Dil Ki Rani	Raj Kumari Singh		
1947	Khubsurat Duniya			
1947	Mere Bhagwan			
1947	Neel Kamal	Ganga	Credited as "Mumtaz"	
1948	Amar Prem	Radha	Lost film	
1948	Desh Seva		Lost film	
1948	Lal Dupatta	Shobha	Lost film	
1948	Parai Aag	Shobha		
1949	Aparadhi	Sheela Rani		
1949	Dawlat	Nirmala		
1949	Dulari	Shobha (Dulari) (Note: She played a single character who has two different names.)		
1949	Imtihaan	Roopa		
1949	Mahal	Kamini (Asha)		
1949	Neki Aur Badi	Sushila		
1949	Paras	Priya		
1949	Singaar	Sitara		
1949	Sipahiya	Rani		
1950	Beqasoor	Usha		
1950	Hanste Aansoo	Usha	First Indian film to be awarded an Adults certification	
1950	Madhubala	Madhubala		
1950	Nirala	Poonam		
1950	Nishana	Radha	Lost film	
1950	Pardes	Chanda	Also producer	
1951	Aaram	Leela		
1951	Badal	Ratna		
1951	Khazana	Asha		
1951	Nadaan	Usha		
1951	Nazneen	Nazneen		
1951	Saiyan	Saiyan		
1951	Tarana	Tarana		
1952	Sangdil	Kamala		
1952	Saqi	Rukhsana		
1953	Armaan	Radha		
1953	Rail Ka Dibba	Chanda	Also producer	
1954	Amar	Anju Roy		
1954	Bahut Din Huwe	Chandrakanta		
1955	Mr. & Mrs. '55	Anita Verma		
1955	Naata	Tara	Also producer	
1955	Naqab	Yasmin		
1955	Teerandaz			
1956	Dhake Ki Malmal	Shivana	Lost film	
1956	Raj Hath	Raja Beti		
1956	Shirin Farhad	Shirin		
1957	Ek Saal	Usha		
1957	Gateway Of India	Anju		
1957	Yahudi Ki Ladki	Farida		
1958	Baghi Sipahi	Ranjana		
1958	Chalti Ka Naam Gaadi	Renu		
1958	Howrah Bridge	Edna		
1958	Kala Pani	Asha		
1958	Phagun	Banani		
1958	Police	Manju		
1959	Do Ustad	Madhu Sharma		
1959	Insaan Jaag Utha	Gauri		
1959	Kal Hamara Hai	Madhu / Bela (Note: She played dual roles.)		
1960	Barsat Ki Rat	Shabnam		
1960	Jaali Note	Renu (Beena)		
1960	Mehlon Ke Khwab	Asha	Also producer	
1960	Mughal-e-Azam	Anarkali (Nadira)	Won—Film Journalists' Association of Bombay award for Best Actress Nominated—Filmfare Award for Best Actress	
1961	Boy Friend	Sangeeta		
1961	Jhumroo	Anjana		
1961	Passport	Rita		
1962	Half Ticket	Asha (Rajni)		
1964	Sharabi	Kamala		
1971	Jwala	Jwala	Only originallly coloured film; released posthumously	
1983	Film Hi Film		Documentary film where the footage of a part of the song "Idhar Toh Dekho Ik, Nazar Toh Phenko..." from the incomplete & shelved film Yeh Basti Yeh Log (1958) sung by Asha Bhosle, lyrics written by Prem Wabartani with music direction of Bhola Shreshtha & picturised on Madhubala and also featuring Balraj Sahni opposite her was shown here. The film was being produced by S. Srivastava & was being directed by Vinod Kumar. The production was said to be abandoned due to Madhubala's illness.	

=== As a producer ===
Year	Title	Acting role	Director	Notes	Ref.
1950	Pardes	Chanda	M. Sadiq	In collaboration with Prem Narayan Arora	
1953	Rail Ka Dibba	Chanda	Prem Narayan Arora	In collaboration with Prem Narayan Arora	
1955	Naata	Tara	D. N. Madhok	Under Madhubala Private Ltd.	
1960	Mehlon Ke Khwab	Asha	Muhafiz Haider	Under Madhubala Private Ltd.	
1962	Pathan	—	Ataullah Khan	Under Madhubala Private Ltd.	

== Incomplete films ==
Year / Period	Title	Notes	Ref.
1949	Haar Singaar	Directed by Mahesh Kaul; production abandoned after a brief period of filming	
1959–1960	Suhana Geet	Shooting began in August 1959; six reels were filmed before production was halted in early 1960 due to Madhubala's health problems	
1960	Hip Hip Hurray	Featuring the lead cast of Chalti Ka Naam Gaadi; production began in January 1960 but was abandoned shortly after due to Madhubala's illness	
1960	Yeh Basti Yeh Log	Opposite Balraj Sahni; production abandoned due to Madhubala's illness	
1960s	Chalaak	Directed by J. K. Nanda and co-starring Raj Kapoor; filming resumed in 1966 but was abandoned after Madhubala's health deteriorated	

=== Replaced ===
Year	Title	Replaced by	Notes	Ref.
1952	Daag	Nimmi		
1957	Naya Daur	Vyjayanthimala	Filmed for over a week; later replaced and sued by director B. R. Chopra for refusing outdoor shootings	
1958	Dilli Ka Thug	Nutan		
1960	Bombai Ka Babu	Suchitra Sen	Dropped out due to health problems	
1962	Naughty Boy	Kalpana Mohan	Dropped out due to health problems	
1962	Pathan	Mumtaz	Dropped out due to health problems	

=== Announced but not produced ===
Year / Period	Title	Notes	Ref.
1950s	Chitralekha	Announced following the success of Tarana (1951); production never started	
1950s	Gohar	Announced following the success of Tarana (1951); production never started	
1960s	Mandir	Opposite Kishore Kumar	
1960s	Kavi Kishordas BA	Opposite Kishore Kumar	
1969	Farz Aur Ishq	Conceived as directorial debut shortly before her death	
