= Amar Prem =

Amar Prem may refer to:

- Amar Prem (1948 film), an Indian Hindi-language mythological film
- Amar Prem (1972 film), an Indian Hindi-language romantic drama film
- Amar Prem (1989 film), a Bengali-language film
