= Madhubala: Her Life, Her Films =

1997 book by Khatija Akbar

- Cover of the 1997 edition
- Author: Khatija Akbar
- Language: English
- Subject: Madhubala
- Genre: Biography
- Published: 1997
- Publisher: UBS Publishers' Distributors
- Publication place: India
- Media type: Print
- Pages: 228
- ISBN: 978-81-747615-3-8
- OCLC: 36806901

Madhubala: Her Life, Her Films is a 1997 biographical book written by Khatija Akbar, chronicling the life and career of the Indian actress Madhubala. It describes her 1933 birth in Delhi, her 22-year-long film career, her marriage to playback singer Kishore Kumar, and her death in 1969. Originally published by UBS Publishers' Distributors, the book was re-published by Hay House on 1 April 2011 under the title of 'I Want to Live': The Story of Madhubala.

== Summary and release ==
It was written by Khatija Akbar and published by UBS Publishers' Distributors in 1997. Opening with the author's foreword thanking those who helped her in writing the book, Madhubala: Her Life, Her Films is a biographical book describing Madhubala's birth in Delhi in 1933, her 22-year-long successful film career, her affairs and marriage to the playback singer Kishore Kumar, and her death in 1969 by ventricular septal defect. The book also extensively examines the production and release of the epic drama Mughal-e-Azam (1960), which became the highest-grossing film of all-time at that point of time and earned her a Filmfare nomination in Best Actress category.

In 1992, when there was no book about the actress, Akbar decided starting write a book on her as a way of "repaying Madhubala for all the years of enjoyment of watching her films". For her research, Akbar collected the archives of magazines such as Filmindia, Filmfare, Movie Times, Shama, and Screen. In 1994, she went on to meet Dilip Kumar, who was Madhubala's frequent collaborator and ex-lover, with helps from his brother, Ahsan Khan. She said that the book would not be done without any inputs from Kumar, describing the 45-minute rendezvous as an "incomparable experience".

The critical reception was negative, with Iqbal Masud of India Today said: "Khatija Akbar's narrative, written with breathless gushiness, does contain aspects of truth but it does not follow them up. For example, two essential features of the Madhubala persona were her impishness and sensuality." Meanwhile, its second edition, first published on Amazon Kindle on 1 April 2011 and later as a paperback book on 10 October (both under the title 'I Want to Live': The Story of Madhubala), gained better responses. In The Tribune, Rachna Singh commented, "[It] has all the ingredients of an Indian film—a beautiful heroine, a Prince Charming, an overbearing father who is a spoke in the romantic wheel and a dreaded disease that is the knell of doom for the beautiful heroine ... A book that is a befitting tribute to not only a gorgeous and skilled actress but also a great human being."
