= Mere Brother Ki Dulhan (soundtrack) =

Soundtrack album by Sohail Sen
- Released: 10 August 2011
- Recorded: 2011
- Studios: YRF Studios, Mumbai; Saba Studio, Mumbai
- Genre: Feature film soundtrack
- Length: 35:21
- Language: Hindi
- Label: YRF Music
- Producer: Sohail Sen

Sohail Sen chronology
Khelein Hum Jee Jaan Sey (2010)	Mere Brother Ki Dulhan (2011)	Ek Tha Tiger (2012)

Mere Brother Ki Dulhan is the soundtrack album accompanying the 2011 film of the same name directed by Ali Abbas Zafar in his directorial debut and produced by Aditya Chopra under Yash Raj Films, starring Imran Khan, Katrina Kaif, Ali Zafar and Tara D'Souza. The soundtrack featured eight songs composed by Sohail Sen with lyrics written by Irshad Kamil and was released through YRF Music on 10 August 2011 to positive reviews from critics.

== Development ==
Sohail Sen composed the film score and soundtrack in his fourth Hindi film after Sirf (2008), What's Your Raashee? (2009) and Khelein Hum Jee Jaan Sey (2010). Irshad Kamil, in his maiden association with Sen, was chosen as the lyricist. Besides acting, Zafar was reported to have sung three songs for the film, but only one song had been finalized under his vocals. "Madhubala", the aforementioned song was considered as the tribute to the eponymous yesteryear actress.

== Release ==
Distributed by Yash Raj's in-house record label YRF Music, the soundtrack was launched on 10 August 2011 at the Inorbit Mall in Malad, Mumbai, with Imran and Katrina in attendance. The event saw the live performance of the musical team conducted and organised by Sen as well as dance performances by the lead pair.

== Reception ==
The soundtrack of the film received positive reviews from music critics. Joginder Tuteja of Bollywood Hungama rated the album favorably, awarding it 3.5/5, stating "Mere Brother Ki Dulhan is a winning album by all means and has in it to be widely popular in days to come. As expected, the entire soundtrack follows a fun approach without anything becoming overtly mushy or mellow. Composer Sohail Sen can be assured that he would now have a successful soundtrack to his name as well that would find a wide audience for itself." Nikhil Hemrajani of Hindustan Times wrote, "That all eight songs in Mere Brother Ki Dulhan's (MBKD) soundtrack are high-energy thumpers probably makes sense for the coming festive season. But there's nothing special about the music, so to speak."

A reviewer based at Indo-Asian News Service (published via NDTV) had summarised "the album is a healthy mix of fun and energy. It is a different attempt from the composer [Sohail Sen], whose effort is visible in the album." Karthik Srinivasan of Milliblog stated "After that predictable and insipid start, composer Sohail Sen does manage to salvage the soundtrack". Sukanya Verma of Rediff.com stated that most of Sohail Sen's compositions were "gorgeously choreographed". Sudhish Kamath, in his review for The Hindu, mentioned the song "Madhubala" and its placement being "simply the best part of the film".

== Track listing ==
No.	Title	Artist(s)	Length
1.	"Mere Brother Ki Dulhan"	KK, Krishna Beura	4:24
2.	"Dhunki"	Neha Bhasin	4:17
3.	"Choomantar"	Benny Dayal, Aditi Singh Sharma	4:20
4.	"Isq Risk"	Rahat Fateh Ali Khan	4:54
5.	"Madhubala"	Ali Zafar, Sreeram Chandra, Shweta Pandit	4:22
6.	"Do Dhaari Talwaar"	Shahid Mallya, Shweta Pandit	5:00
7.	"Choomantar" (Remix)	Benny Dayal, Aditi Singh Sharma	3:42
8.	"Isq Risk" (Risky Mix)	Sreeram Chandra, Neha Bhasin	4:39
Total length:			35:51

== Accolades ==
Award	Category	Recipient	Result
Filmfare Awards	Best Music Director	Sohail Sen	Nominated
International Indian Film Academy Awards	Best Music Director	Sohail Sen	Nominated
Mirchi Music Awards	Female Vocalist of The Year	Neha Bhasin – "Dhunki"	Nominated
Producers Guild Film Awards	Best Female Playback Singer	Neha Bhasin – "Dhunki"	Nominated
