= Lal Dupatta =

1948 film by K.B. Lall

- Directed by: K. B. Lall
- Written by: K. B. Lall
- Produced by: Akash Chitra
- Starring: Madhubala; Rajan Haksar; D.K. Sapru
- Cinematography: Fali Mistry
- Edited by: Moolgavakar
- Music by: Gyan Dutt
- Release date: 10 December 1948
- Running time: 112 minutes
- Country: India
- Language: Hindi

Lal Dupatta (transl. "Red Scarf") is a 1948 Indian Hindi-language drama film directed by K. B. Lall and produced by Akash Chitra. Starring Madhubala, Rajan Haskar and D. K. Sapru, the film tells the story of Shobha, a headstrong village girl whose romance with a zamindar goes into awry due to some misunderstandings.

Lal Dupatta premiered in theatres on 10 December 1948, and proved to be a commercial and critical success, with critics praising Madhubala's performance and Lall's direction. The success of Lal Dupatta marked a major turning point in the career of Madhubala. The film's print was lost by the studio just after few years of its release, making it a lost film.

== Plot ==
The film revolves around Kanwar, a young zamindar of Amirpur, who falls for a farmer's daughter named Shobha. When the Manager of Amirpur, who is a close relative of Kanwar and is jealous of his riches and property gets to learn this, he tries creating misunderstandings between Shobha and Kanwar. On the day of their marriage, the Manager gets Shobha's father murdered by his goons. Moreover, he declares Shobha as the illegitimate child of her father, and pays an old lady to act as her mother. Kanwar, on learning that Shobha is a "sin", throws her out of his house. She is now left with nothing to eat and nowhere to live. Other villagers refuse to provide her shelter and food.

Shobha, with the help of her friend Sukhiya manages to learn the truth of Manager. When she confronts him about this, he tries to molest her. She soon gets the grip of a gun and shoots him. As the film ends, she is seen standing happily on a hill with Kanwar, her red scarf "Lal Dupatta" flying and a sense of triumph on her face.

== Cast ==
The main cast of the film was:

- Madhubala as Shobha
- Rajan Haskar as Kanwar
- D.K. Sapru as Manager
- Ulhas as Mukhiya
- Ranjeet Kumari as Sukhiya
- Kesari as Sawan, one of Manager's goons
- Miss Gulzar as the lady who acts as Shobha's mother

== Crew ==
- Dialogue: Manohar Khanna
- Photography: Fali Mistry
- Audiography: Moolgaavkar

== Production ==
The film was initially named Apna Raj but was renamed Lal Dupatta to make it seem a woman-centric film.

The closeup scenes of busts and hip movements of Sukhiya after she taking a bath in second song were removed on the instructions of the Central Board of Film Certification.

== Soundtrack ==
The soundtrack was composed by Gyan Dutt and D.N. Madhok, Shams Lakhnawi and Manohar Khanna wrote song's lyrics. "Jahan Koi Na Ho" was a popular song.

No.	Song	Singer
1	"Jahan Koi Na Ho"	Sulochana Kadam
2	"Ari O Albeli Naar"	Shamshad Begum, Mohammed Rafi
3	"Bhala Ho Tera O Rula Dene Wale"	Geeta Dutt
4	"Mere Uljhe Uljhe Sapne"	Surinder Kaur
5	"Meri Phool Bagiya Mein"	Shamshad Begum, Surinder Kaur
6	"Ari O Ab Tere Bin"	Ram Kalbani, Zohrabai Ambalewali
7	"Bujh Gaya Dil Ka Diyaa"	G.M. Durrani
8	"Chalo Jamuna Ke Paar"	Mohammed Rafi, Sulochana Kadam, Shamshad Begum
9	"Chanchal Man Kahe Dhadhke?"	Surinder Kaur
10	"Mora Lal Dupatta Udta Jaaye"	Surinder Kaur
11	"Mere Dil Ki Ram Kahani Sun Ja"	Surinder Kaur
12	"Meethi Baatein Suna Ke"	Geeta Dutt

== Release ==
Lal Dupatta premiered at the Royal Opera in Bombay (today Mumbai) on 10 December 1948. Two days later, The Times of India reported: "Lal Dupatta Opens To A Packed House".

== Reception ==
The film received positive reviews by critics. In Filmindia's review, Baburao Patel wrote, "K.B. Lall has given us a good picture. It is excellent in parts and good all around." Patel praised Madhubala highly for her performance. He stated that "Madhubala acquires a new screen personality [in the film] and plays Shobha beautifully. She also proves herself at once competent and versatile in both light and pathetic sequences."

The film was a box office success and established Madhubala in the film industry. The Indian Express said that her work in Lal Dupatta established her as a leading lady. In its April 1949 issue, The Motion Picture Magazine remarked that the film was "well received all over the country" and Madhubala "is fast heading for stardom".
