= Hanste Aansoo =

1950 Indian film by K. B. Lal

- Directed by: K. B. Lall
- Screenplay by: K. B. Lall
- Produced by: K. B. Lall
- Starring: Madhubala; Motilal; Gope
- Cinematography: Kumar Jaywant
- Music by: Ghulam Mohammad
- Release date: December 1, 1950
- Country: India
- Language: Hindustani

Hanste Aansoo (transl. "Laughing Tears") is a 1950 Indian Hindi-language romantic comedy film directed by K. B. Lall and starring Madhubala and Motilal, with Gope and Manorama appearing in supporting roles. The music for the film is composed by Ghulam Mohammed.

The first Indian film to get an Adults certification, Hanste Aansoo was both a controversial and popular release, receiving praise for Madhubala's performance and notoriety for its bold storyline.

== Plot ==
Hanste Aansoo revolves around an educated girl, Usha (Madhubala), who is reluctantly married off into a family by her mercenary, drunkard father. Her illiterate husband, Kumar (Motilal), is jealous of Usha's intelligence and frank behaviour, and one day abuses her physically. Unexpectedly, Usha leaves his house, and begins battling for women rights alone. She gives birth to Kumar's son in between, and starts working in a factory, where her male co-workers ridicule her. After several comical scenes and melodrama, the film ends with Kumar apologising to Usha, and she returning to his house.

== Cast ==
The main cast of the film included:

- Madhubala as Usha
- Motilal as Kumar, Usha's husband
- Gope as a factory worker
- Manorama as Ranjeeta, Usha's supporter
- Jankidas as Usha's father in-law
- Cuckoo Moray as stage dancer

== Release and certification ==
The film premiered in Bombay on 1 December 1950.

It became the first Indian film to be awarded an Adults certification, following the amendment of the original Indian Cinematograph Act (1918) in December 1949. The reasons behind such certification were the film's double-meaning title (laughing tears), and its depiction of a modern age woman fighting for her rights, during the time when women were restricted to household chores, were expected to be completely submitted to their spouses, and had no freedom for education or were allowed to work outside.

== Reception ==
A Times of India review, dated 23 December 1950, carried the headline: "Hanste Ansu Tickles The Groundings".

In a review for filmindia, Baburao Patel noted that "the picture has nothing objectionable in it to justify this classification [A certificate] but by classifying it this, the Censors have classified themselves as unnecessarily prudish and unintelligent."

On Madhubala's performance, Patel commented: "The versatility of this girl seems to be endless. In this picture, in addition to her serious and pathetic work, she shows a rare talent for flirting. [...] It is not an easy job to steal a scene from these two seasoned artists (Gope and Motilal), but Madhubala does it."

The release of Hanste Aansoo coincided with Madhubala's boycott by the All India Journalists' Association. Around this time, Filmindia published a letter from a fan in Bangalore:

I had read in a film journal that certain journalists of Bombay have determined to boycott the versatile star Madhubala. I, therefore, thought that her picture Hanste Ansu would prove a failure. But the House was full in a few minutes though it was the third week of its release. What more proof is required to establish the popularity of Madhubala? Let me assure the honourable "journalists" that they are in a dreamland if they think they can boycott her from the hearts of millions of cine fans."
