= Amar Prem (1948 film) =

1948 Indian film

- Directed by: N. M. Kelkar
- Produced by: V. N. Misra; Natraj Pictures
- Starring: Madhubala; Raj Kapoor
- Music by: Datta Thakar
- Release date: 1948
- Country: India
- Language: Hindi

Amar Prem, also known as Radha Krishna, is a 1948 Indian Hindi-language mythological film, produced by V. N. Misra under the banner of Natraj Pictures and directed by N. M. Kelkar. The soundtrack was composed by Datta Thakar. It was one of the earliest films featuring Madhubala and Raj Kapoor in leading roles.

Amar Prem was one of 24 films in which Madhubala appeared during the first four years of her career as a leading actress (1947–1950). Biographer Urmila Lanba noted that the actress worked prolifically in this period to secure herself financially; however, this film—alongside others including Chittor Vijay (1947) and Parai Aag (1948)—was not successful.

Amar Prem is was considered to be a lost film. but is now found and regarded as a great film.

== Cast ==
According to Asian Film Directory And Whos Who (1952):

- Madhubala (credited as "Madhu Bala")
- Raj Kapoor
- Alka Rani
- Nimbalkar
- Madhav Kale
- Ramesh Arora
- P. R. Joshi
- Modan Misra
- Sinhe

== Soundtrack ==
The soundtrack of the film consists of six songs composed by Dutt Thakur with lyrics by Mohan Mishra.

Soundtrack
No.	Song	Singers
1	Aao Chale Manwa	Rajkumari, Mohammed Rafi
2	Basant Chhaya Charon Or	Amirbai Karnataki, Rajkumari
3	Bhai Vrindavan Men	Rajkumari
4	Nav Bhor	Rajkumari
5	Jamuna Ke Tat Par	Rekha Rani
6	Chidiya Hoon Main Aandhi Mein	Amirbai Karnataki

== Production ==
The filming of Amar Prem took place during April 1948 at I. & T. Studios in Bombay (now Mumbai).

== Release ==
One scene, showing the suicide of Kamsa, was deleted from the film by the Central Board of Film Certification.
