= Parai Aag =

1948 Indian film

- Directed by: Najam Naqvi
- Produced by: M. K. Ahmad; Great India Pictures
- Starring: Munawar Sultana; Madhubala
- Music by: Ghulam Mohammed
- Release date: August 20, 1948
- Country: India
- Language: Hindi

Parai Aag is a 1948 Indian Hindi-language film, produced by M. K. Ahmad under the banner of Great India Pictures, and directed by Najam Naqvi. It stars Munawar Sultana and Madhubala. The soundtrack features songs composed by Ghulam Mohammed, with lyrics by Tanvir Naqvi.

Parai Aag was one of the earliest films featuring Madhubala, before she became a star with Mahal (1949).

== Cast ==
According to Asian Film Directory And Whos Who (1952):

- Munawar Sultana
- Madhubala
- Ulhas
- Sheri
- W. M. Khan
- A. Shah
- Ziloo Bai
- Khalil

== Production ==
The production of Parai Aag reportedly began in February 1948.

The film's distribution rights for Pakistan were acquired by Mis. Evershine Pictures of Lahore.

== Soundtrack ==
The music of the film was composed by Ghulam Mohammed, with lyrics penned by Tanvir Naqvi and Akhtar ul Iman.

No.	Title	Lyrics	Singer(s)
1	"Man Geet Suhane Gaye Kyon"	Tanveer Naqvi	Zohrabai Ambalewali
2	"Kuch Bhi Na Kaha Aur Keh Bhi Gaye"	Tanveer Naqvi	Hameeda Bano
3	"Nigahen Milane Ko Jee Chahata Hai"	Tanveer Naqvi	Mohammed Rafi
4	"Kaun Tere Man Bhaya Kisne Hai Tumko Apnaya"	Tanveer Naqvi	Hameeda Bano
5	"Tohe Kaise Dikhaoon Dil Cheer Ke"	Akhtar ul Iman	Zohrabai, Naseem Akhtar
6	"Bhool Ja Vo Pyaar Ke Rangeen Fasane Bhool Ja"	Tanveer Naqvi	Hameeda Bano
7	"Kisse Kahen Ki Kaun Hamare Chale Gaye"	Tanveer Naqvi	Zohrabai
8	"Ae Dil Jahaan Mein Tera Thikana Koi Nahin"	Akhtar ul Iman	Zohrabai

== Reception ==
Parai Aag was released on 20 August 1948 in Lamington Talkies.

A contemporary review by Baburao Patel described the film as "tolerably entertaining" but logically flawed. While praising Madhubala's and A. Shah's performances, and the "witty" dialogue of the first half, the critic panned the casting of Ulhas and the repetitive nature of the film's later social messaging.
