= Madhubala =

Indian actress (1933–1969)

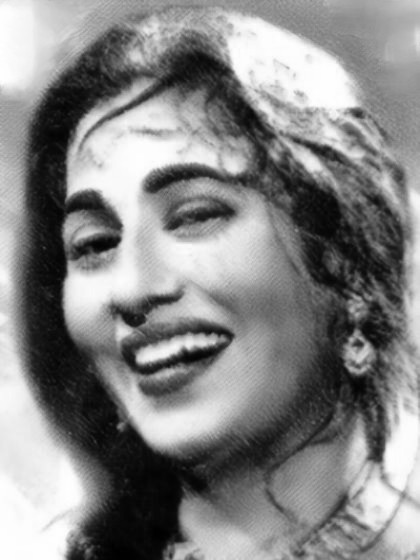
- Born: Mumtaz Jehan Begum Dehlavi; 14 February 1933; Delhi, British India
- Died: 23 February 1969 (aged 36); Bombay, Maharashtra, India
- Cause of death: Ventricular septal defect
- Resting place: Juhu Muslim Cemetery, Santa Cruz, Mumbai
- Occupations: Actress; film producer
- Years active: 1942–1964
- Works: Full list
- Spouse: Kishore Kumar (m. 1960)
- Father: Ataullah Khan
- Relatives: Chanchal (sister); Ganguly family (via marriage)

Mumtaz Jehan Begum Dehlavi (14 February 1933 – 23 February 1969), known professionally as Madhubala (pronounced [məd̪ʱubɑːlɑː]), was an Indian actress and film producer who was one of the leading stars of the Golden Age of Hindi cinema. She is known for her beauty and performances in dramatic, romantic and comedic roles. Although her beauty became central to her public image and earned her the nickname "Venus of the Indian screen", later critics have argued that her physical appeal often overshadowed her acting talent. Her portrayal of Anarkali in the historical epic Mughal-e-Azam (1960) has been named by critics as one of the finest performances in Indian cinematic history.

Born in Delhi, Madhubala migrated with her family to Bombay (now Mumbai) in her childhood. Her family's financial hardships led her to pursue a screen career as a child artiste, starting at the age of nine with Basant in 1942. She progressed to leading roles with the drama Neel Kamal (1947). Many of her early films received a lukewarm response, but the success of Lal Dupatta (1948) and the gothic film Mahal (1949) established her as a leading lady of Hindi cinema. By the early 1950s, she was one of India's highest-paid film stars, with commercially successful films such as Baadal and Tarana (both 1951).

Despite a mixed critical reception to many of her performances, Madhubala remained popular and sought more substantial acting roles. In 1954, she starred in the high-profile productions Bahut Din Huwe and Amar, and further co-founded her production company Madhubala Private Ltd., under which she produced and acted in Naata (1955). However, these films were unsuccessful at the box office, leading to a setback in her career. At a time when comedy was considered unsuitable for leading actresses, Madhubala's comic performances in Mr. & Mrs. '55 (1955) and Gateway of India (1957) earned her renewed critical and commercial success.

The period between 1958 and 1960 marked the peak of Madhubala's career, during which she starred in several of the highest-grossing films of their respective years. In 1958, she played a diverse range of roles in the thrillers Kala Pani and Howrah Bridge and the comedy Chalti Ka Naam Gaadi. In 1960, she starred in two of the decade's biggest commercial successes: the historical epic Mughal-e-Azam—then the highest-grossing Indian film—and the musical Barsaat Ki Raat. She worked only sporadically thereafter, appearing in films such as Half Ticket (1962) and Sharabi (1964), which marked her final screen appearance during her lifetime.

Known for maintaining a low public profile, Madhubala attracted considerable media attention for her personal life, including her relationship with Dilip Kumar and marriage to Kishore Kumar. She suffered from health complications caused by a ventricular septal defect throughout her adult life and died in 1969 at the age of 36. Decades after her death, Madhubala remains one of the most enduring figures of Hindi cinema, with her legacy influencing South Asian popular culture and receiving recognition in India and abroad. In 2000, she was named by India Today as one of the 100 people who shaped India in the 20th century.

== Life and career ==
=== Birth and childhood (1933–1940) ===
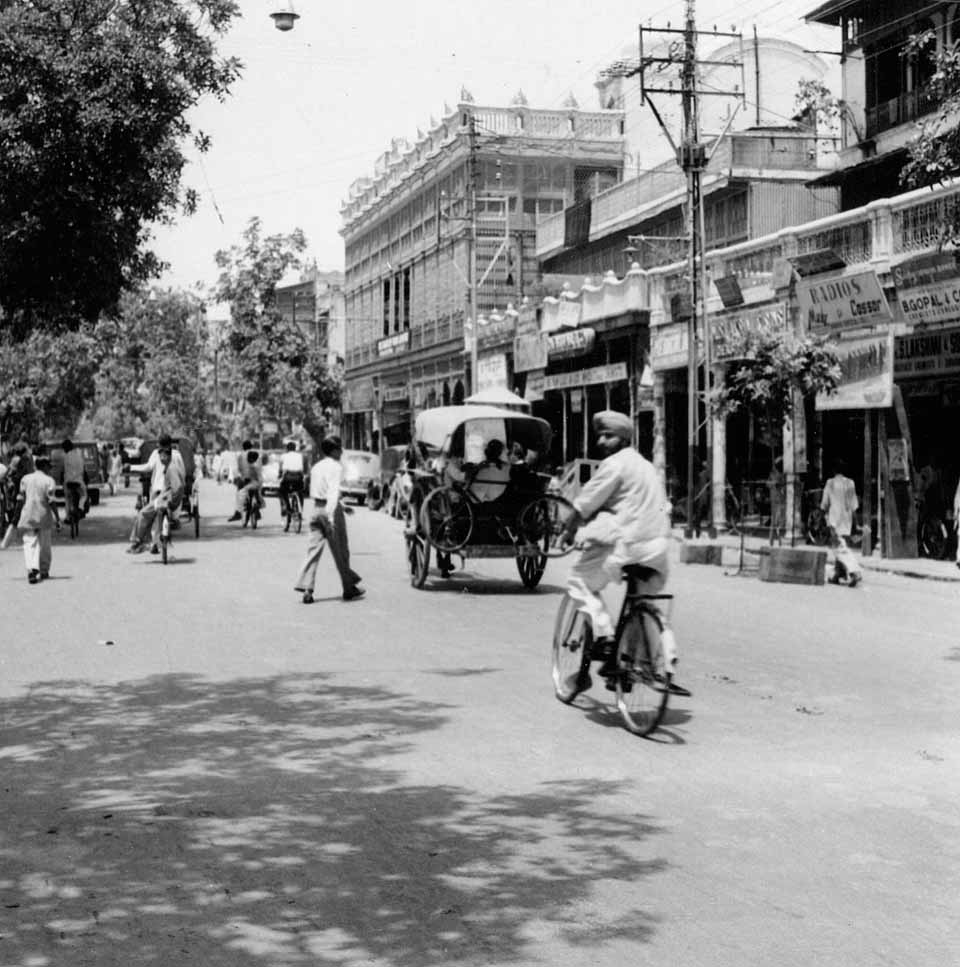
Madhubala was born and brought up in Delhi

Madhubala was born as Mumtaz Jehan Begum Dehlavi in Delhi, British India, on 14 February 1933. She was the fifth of eleven children—seven girls and four boys—of Ataullah Khan and Begum Ayeesha (also referred to as "Aayesha Begum"). Khan belonged to the Yusufzai tribe of Pashtuns from Peshawar valley, originating from Swabi District, North-West Frontier Province, and was an employee at the Imperial Tobacco Company in Peshawar before he moved the family to Delhi. Her mother was originally from Lahore.

Madhubala's four brothers died in childhood; her sisters who survived to adulthood were Kaneez Fatima, Altaf, Zeb (known professionally as Chanchal), Shahida and Madhur Bhushan (née Zahida). Madhubala did not receive any formal education; according to Bhushan, their father was reluctant to educate his daughters. Madhubala, however, gained proficiency in Urdu under her father's guidance. She and her sisters often spent time dancing and imitating film characters to entertain themselves.

=== Early roles and financial struggles (1941–1946) ===
Madhubala's opportunity to pursue a career in entertainment arose from her family's financial difficulties following Khan's loss of employment. She initially took part in children's radio programmes and sang compositions by Khwaja Khurshid Anwar.

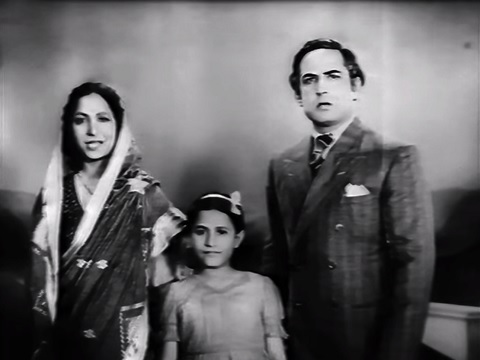
Madhubala (mid) played a minor role in the 1942 film Basant, starring Mumtaz Shanti (l) and Ulhas (r)

Khan and the family eventually relocated to Bombay in search of better opportunities. Madhubala and her father began making frequent visits to film studios to find work. In 1942, a nine-year-old Madhubala was noticed by Bombay Talkies' head Devika Rani, who cast her in the production Basant. Her role was that of Ulhas and Mumtaz Shanti's daughter, who brings her separated parents together; she also sang two songs for herself. Released in July 1942, Basant became a major commercial success; however, Madhubala did not receive further work offers and returned to Delhi with her family.

In 1944, Rani summoned Madhubala for a role in Jwar Bhata (1944). Although Madhubala did not get the role, Khan decided to settle permanently in Bombay after seeing greater prospects in the film industry. The family settled in Malad. In April, their residence was completely destroyed during the Bombay Dock explosion; the family survived because it had left for a local cinema shortly before the blast. They subsequently had to seek shelter in a friend's residence. In a later interview, Madhubala recalled her early years as a period in which there were "moments free of care and filled with joy" followed by "hardship and the heart-breaking effort to live and sustain oneself".

At this time, Khan aimed for Madhubala to become the breadwinner of the family, although her sister Madhur Bhushan later asserted that Madhubala was not forced to work:

"My sister loved to sing and dance and was fond of music and poetry. It's wrong to accuse my father of compelling her to work in films – films came her way, he never pushed her into anything ... He couldn't imagine he'd get so caught up chaperoning her that he'd never get back to working himself."

Madhubala (below) in Mumtaz Mahal (1944), one of the films she worked in as a child actor; seen alongside Khursheed Bano

Madhubala was eventually employed by Ranjit Studios in 1944. As studio executive Chandulal Shah deemed her too young for a leading role, she was given child roles in five Ranjit films, released between 1944 and 1946 under the screen name Baby Mumtaz. She was paid a monthly salary of ₹300, and became the sole earning member of her family.

While working on a film during this time, Madhubala collapsed on set and was diagnosed with a congenital heart defect. She also vomited blood on the sets of Phoolwari (1946), an early symptom of the heart condition that would progressively worsen throughout her career. Cardiologist Rustom Jal Vakil later examined Madhubala and confirmed that she had a ventricular septal defect, which was potentially fatal. Khan kept her illness a secret fearing that it would jeopardize her career.

=== Transition to leading roles and breakthrough (1947–1949) ===
"Neither her looks, nor her raw talent impressed me so much as her intelligence and diligence. She worked like a machine, missed a meal, travelled daily in the over-crowded third-class compartments from Malad to Dadar and was never late or absent from work. Even at that age, the little lady knew her duty to her father who had so many mouths to feed with no visible means of support."

— Kidar Sharma, the director of Neel Kamal (1947)

In 1946, director Kidar Sharma had cast Madhubala in a juvenile role in Ranjit Studio's upcoming venture Bichara Bhagwan; however, when the film's leading actress, Kamla Chatterjee, died, he decided to replace her with the 14-year-old Madhubala. Sharma had previously directed Madhubala as a child artiste and was impressed by her hardworking nature, but Chandulal Shah deemed her unsuitable for a leading role and refused to finance the film; consequently, Sharma funded the production using his personal assets. He renamed the film Neel Kamal, with Madhubala playing a young princess who gets involved in a love triangle with characters played by debutante Raj Kapoor and Begum Para.

Madhubala was credited as "Mumtaz" in Neel Kamal. The film proved to be a commercial flop on its release in March 1947, but she and Kapoor were noted by critics for their onscreen chemistry and went on to appear together in more films: Mohan Sinha's Chittor Vijay and Dil Ki Rani (both 1947), and N. M. Kelkar's mythological Amar Prem (1948). She subsequently lowered her fees to attract further film offers, and adopted the screen name "Madhubala" on the suggestion of Mohan Sinha. (Note: Although Devika Rani is popularly credited with giving Madhubala her screen name, journalist Roshmila Mukherjee wrote in a 1992 Filmfare article that it was actually director Mohan Sinha who suggested it. Sinha's granddaughter, actress Vidya Sinha, later corroborated this account in an interview with Rediff.com.) Although it has often been suggested that Muslim actors including Madhubala adopted Hindu screen names to minimise cultural backlash, film scholar Rachel Dwyer argued that they were instead chosen to appear "more fashionable or less 'ethnic'."

Between 1947 and 1950, Madhubala appeared in 24 films. While most of her earlier work was unsuccessful and failed to propel her career, she received particular attention with the drama Lal Dupatta (1948). A report in The Bombay Chronicle stated that Madhubala "appears at her best" in the film with her "mischief and youth and charm", while film critic Baburao Patel hailed Lal Dupatta as the "first milestone of her maturity in screen acting", observing that Madhubala had developed from a child actress into an attractive young leading lady. She received further praise for her supporting role in Paras, one of the nine films she featured in 1949. Writing her profile three years later, Jagdish Bhatia compared Madhubala's portrayal of a deaf-mute girl to Jane Wyman's acclaimed performance in Johnny Belinda, and wrote that it "won her a million hearts overnight."

Madhubala's portrayal of an elusive woman who pretends to be an apparition in Bombay Talkies' Mahal (1949) established her as a leading lady. The reincarnation-themed film, co-starring Ashok Kumar, is considered an early example of Indian gothic cinema. Her role was intended for Suraiya, then the industry's most popular actress; however, director Kamal Amrohi insisted on casting Madhubala, wanting a new face for the role. Although studio executives opposed the decision, Amrohi later recalled that the film brought her "true capabilities" to wider recognition and established her as a polished actress.

Released in October 1949, Mahal was popular with critics and emerged as one of the decade's biggest commercial successes. Reviewing for The Motion Picture Magazine, a critic wrote that Madhubala and Kumar had delivered "the finest performance of their careers, thus adding extra lustre to their already shining reputation". Dwyer later observed that Madhubala's relative anonymity at the time of release "added to her mystery as a newcomer and beautiful stranger". The film's success brought Madhubala nationwide popularity and led to a series of starring roles opposite many of the era's leading actors.

Madhubala had further commercial success in 1949 with the musical Dulari, although her portrayal of the titular character received mixed reviews. In her final release of 1949, Madhubala appeared in a supporting role in the drama Singaar (1949), starring Suraiya and P. Jairaj. Patel found Madhubala miscast in the role of a dancing girl, but believed that she "beats Suraiya hollow in every sequence they meet" and "stores more emotions in a single face than would a thousand girls with as many faces". According to Urmila Lanba, Madhubala's rising popularity enabled her to supplant Suraiya as Hindi cinema's leading female star. With her growing media exposure, Madhubala attempted to refine her persona with English lessons from Sushila Rani Patel and classical dance training under Sitara Devi. Despite a lack of formal schooling, she grew fluent in English within three months; however, she struggled with the physical demands of dancing due to her recurring heart condition.

=== Press controversy and rise to stardom (1950–1952) ===
As her stardom grew, Madhubala gained a reputation for strict punctuality and keeping a low public profile, and the media increasingly scrutinized her father Ataullah Khan's influence over her career. Her reclusivity was attributed to Khan, who reportedly restricted her studio hours from 8 a.m. to 6 p.m., and prohibited her from attending press previews, granting interviews, or interacting with film magazines.

In 1950, Madhubala became the subject of sustained negative press coverage following a production dispute during the filming of Nirala. She had refused to enter a pool for a sequence, citing hygiene concerns; this upset director P. L. Santoshi, who halted filming for days and circulated accounts portraying her as difficult to work with. Although Santoshi later accepted Khan's apology and filming resumed, the press continued publishing hostile reports. In response, Khan inserted clauses into her contracts barring journalists from entering her film sets. The All India Action Committee retaliated by imposing a formal boycott on Madhubala, refusing to publish her photographs, interviews, or publicity material. The dispute also led to death threats against Madhubala, prompting authorities to provide security measures.

Despite the ongoing boycott, Madhubala's film releases Beqasoor and Hanste Aansoo opened to a positive reception from audiences. The former became one of the top-earning films of the year, though critics were divided over her portrayal of a young wife who turns to stage dancing under financial strain; a writer for The Bombay Chronicle dismissed it as "about the poorest [effort] I have ever seen from her", describing her as "pretty but little else." With the romantic drama Madhubala (1950), she became one of the few actors to have a film named after them, alongside the 1930s star Sulochana. However, Madhubala earned negative reviews and bombed at the box office.

Madhubala added to her reputation with charitable work in August 1950 by donating ₹50,000 to the East Bengali refugees' relief fund, earning praise from Bombay Home Minister Morarji Desai, and later contributing ₹5,001 to the Society for the Rehabilitation of Crippled Children. (Note: While praised by Desai, Madhubala's charity work received negative coverage in the press due to ongoing boycott; according to biographer Khatija Akbar, "The generosity was described as a design, the charity given a motive; she was vilified by vicious cartoons and abused roundly." Madhubala subsequently conducted her charitable activities more privately. In 1954, it was revealed that she had been providing monthly bonuses to the lower-level staff at her studios, which prompted journalist Baburao Patel to call her the "queen of charity". She gifted a camera crane to the Film and Television Institute of India in 1962, which remains operational as of 2017.) She ventured into independent production this year with Lali Chandan (earlier named Kisan Ki Gae), which was, however, ultimately shelved. The drama Pardes (1950), in which she also starred with Rehman, marked Madhubala's first film as a producer, in collaboration with producer Prem Narayan Arora. Some journalists unsuccessfully attempted to get the film banned, but it became a commercial success on its release. In a year-end review of the Indian film industry of 1950, critic Daulatram Parshuram observed that Madhubala had "gradually gained top position" among the leading actresses, "and deservedly so".

By 1951, Madhubala was one of Hindi cinema's highest-paid stars, reported to be earning ₹1.5 lakh per film. She starred in seven films this year, including the adventure movie Baadal, which was among the highest earning films of 1951. Her performance as a noblewoman drew praise, although a critic suggested that she "speak her dialogue slowly, distinctly and effectively instead of rattling through her lines in a monotone". Madhubala's conflict with the press concluded in early 1951 following an apology mediated by journalist B. K. Karanjia, who was one of the leaders of the boycott. Karanjia argued that "the press needed Madhubala as much as Madhubala needed the press", later acknowledging that the journalists had "over-reacted" due to "ego problems".

During this time, Madhubala was extensively photographed at her Bombay flat by American photojournalist James Cobb Burke for a part of a proposed Life magazine feature on Asian film actresses, titled "Movie Queens". (Note: The photographs were not included in the published feature and would remain largely inaccessible for decades until the 2008 digitization of the Time Life archive. Other actresses photographed for the feature were Nalini Jaywant, Kamini Kaushal, and Begum Para; only Para's photographs were ultimately published.) In her private life, Madhubala had a brief relationship with Baadal co-star Prem Nath, with whom she further worked with in Aaram (both 1951) and Saqi (1952). They also contemplated marriage but eventually broke up due to religious differences, nevertheless maintaining a lifelong friendship. She later began a more serious relationship with actor Dilip Kumar, a fellow Muslim of Pashtun descent, while working on the village romance Tarana (1951).

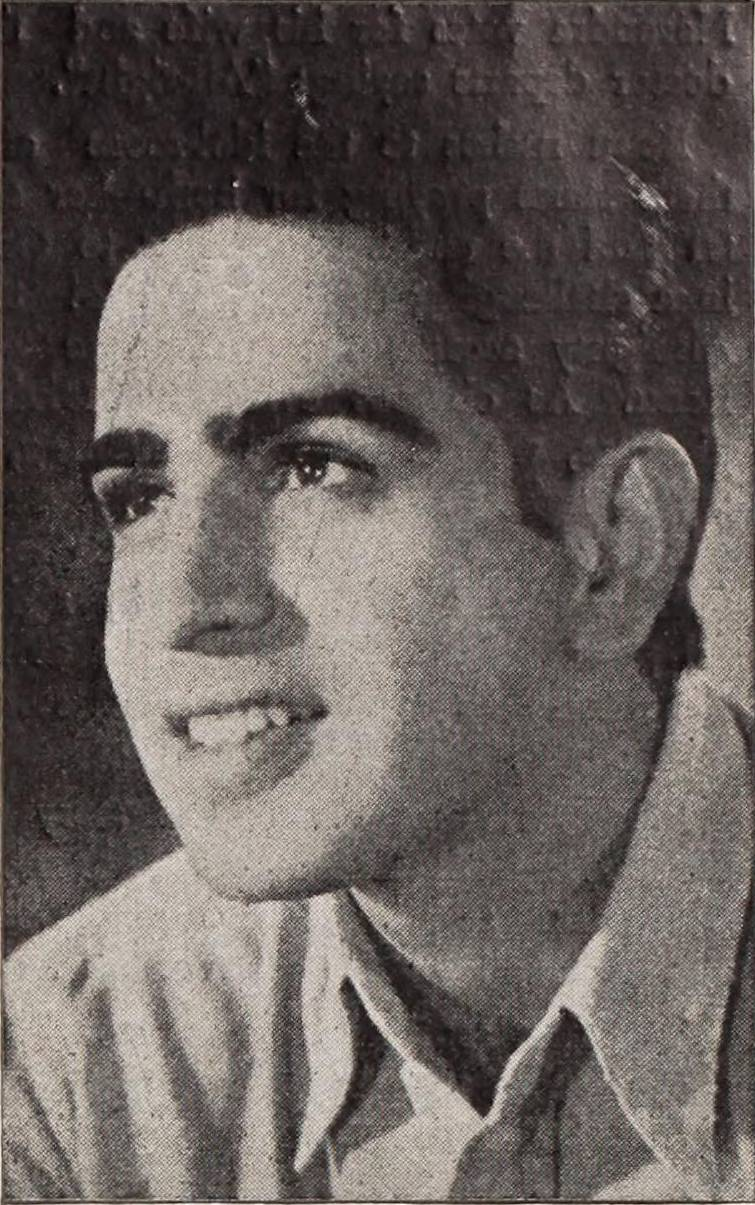
Madhubala began a relationship with actor Dilip Kumar, her co-star in Tarana, in 1951

Madhubala's friends have recalled the romance period with Kumar as the happiest years of her life. According to Nadira: "She considered herself married to him ... She wore his ring, he wore hers." Tarana, directed by Ram Daryani, was a critical and commercial success when it was released in October 1951. Patel wrote of it as a "well-produced picture", adding: "It is difficult to separate the performances of Madhubala and Dilip. Both have almost lived their roles, and their romantic sequences seem to take their dues from the real canvas of life." Continuing their collaboration, Madhubala and Kumar then starred in Sangdil (1952), a moderately successful adaptation of Charlotte Brontë's novel Jane Eyre. Several films were announced subsequently to capitalise on their popularity as a pair, including a color production named Chitralekha, which was eventually shelved.

=== Career expansion and fluctuations (1953–1955) ===
"Once I have finished work at the studio, I do not want to be Madhubala, the star. I'm just a normal, average girl, and only at home am I treated as such. That is why I remain so much within the four walls of my home."

— Madhubala, in a 1954 interview with Filmfare

Having established herself in Hindi cinema, Madhubala sought more substantial roles and opportunities to work with acclaimed directors. Eager to collaborate with Bimal Roy, she lobbied for the title role in his upcoming film Biraj Bahu, but Roy considered her fee beyond the film's budget and eventually cast Kamini Kaushal. Madhubala however secured the lead role in Mehboob Khan's Amar after Meena Kumari withdrew during production.

1953 saw Madhubala produce and star in Rail Ka Dibba, playing a homeless woman who falls in love with Shammi Kapoor's character. The film received mixed reviews, with Ranjit Singh of The Sunday Standard dismissing it as "an average sort of a picture". In mid-1953, Madhubala and Ataullah Khan founded the production company Madhubala Private Ltd. Managed largely by Khan, the company launched several projects that were later abandoned, resulting in financial losses.

Madhubala was also cast opposite Dilip Kumar as Anarkali in K. Asif's historical epic Mughal-e-Azam in 1953. Although she began filming the same year, production progressed slowly because of the film's scale and Asif's demands of perfectionism. Madhubala continued working on Mughal-e-Azam intermittently till 1959 while simultaneously managing other projects. The role of a Mughal-era court dancer was physically demanding, requiring her to perform scenes in heavy costumes and elaborate dance sequences that placed additional strain on her heart condition; she also occasionally collapsed on set.

Madhubala's health faltered in early 1954 during the filming of S. S. Vasan's Bahut Din Huwe in Madras. She vomited blood after a severe coughing spell, forcing a brief break from filming and bringing the first widespread press reports of her illness. After her recovery, she returned to complete the four-month production schedule. Bahut Din Huwe was a large-scale fantasy production by Gemini Studios, and according to Ashokamitran, it was the studio's first film to star an established North Indian film star like Madhubala. To show her gratitude for Vasan's support during her illness, she made a rare exception by attending the film's premiere. Bahut Din Huwe, however, was an unpopular release among audiences.

Dinesh Raheja retrospectively described Amar (1954) as "arguably Madhubala's first truly mature performance". The psychological melodrama saw her play a social worker who faces a moral crisis when she discovers that her fiancé (Dilip Kumar) has raped a woman (Nimmi). According to scholar Bhaskar Sarkar, Madhubala's role embodied the ideal and "modern (perhaps protofeminist)" Indian woman in post-partition cinema, and that her "angelic" persona increased the character's appeal. Amar was a critically acclaimed release but received minimal returns at the box office, which was attributed to its controversial subject matter. The commercial failure of Bahut Din Huwe and Amar—made by two of the industry's most successful producers—led to reports that some producers had begun to regard Madhubala as a "jinx".

During the first quarter of 1955, Madhubala balanced the filming of Guru Dutt's Mr. & Mrs. '55 with the production of Naata, a venture under her own production house. Seeking a change after years of "acting, acting and acting", Madhubala expressed a desire to take a temporary break and explore directing instead. In February, she announced her directorial debut with a project titled Sham-e-Oudh. However, it was shelved the following month. (Note: According to screenwriter Abrar Alvi, while he was working on Pyaasa (1957), Madhubala planned another directorial venture and approached him to write a screenplay that would "reverse the boy-loves-girl-and-parents-oppose-it theme". By the time Alvi became available, however, she had fallen ill, and the project was never realised.)

In Mr. & Mrs. '55, a satire on marriage of convenience and the highly debated Hindu code bills, Madhubala played Anita Verma, a naive heiress who is forced by her aunt into a sham marriage with Dutt's character. With little prior experience in comedy, Madhubala was initially sceptical of the genre, but she became more comfortable as filming progressed; Abrar Alvi, who served as the assistant director, observed:

the role was completely foreign to her [but] once she walked through the scenes, she got the nuances and acted them with aplomb. Her timing was perfect. She knew exactly how to get a reaction from the audience and how long to hold that reaction ... By the time we finished the film, she had come to realise that she could be a great comic artist too.

According to critic Shantanu Ray Chaudhuri, Madhubala's expansion into comedy—a genre then held in low esteem by the film industry—set her apart from other contemporary leading ladies. Mr. & Mrs. '55 emerged as one of the highest-grossing films of the year when released in early 1955. Indian Daily Mail stated that Madhubala's comedic performance dismantled her "tragic heroine" typecasting, and credited her "spontaneity, youthful charm, effervescence and lively sense of humour" for the film's success.

Later in 1955, Madhubala Private Ltd. released its debut production: D. N. Madhok's Naata, starring Madhubala alongside her sister Chanchal and Abhi Bhattacharya. Baburao Patel dismissed it as a "dull, poor and clumsy picture", but Swantantra argued it as a "commendable venture" by the producers, adding that "Madhubala has never before given such an excellent performance. Known for her charm and beauty this time she makes the grade as an actress of high calibre". Naata failed commercially, and Madhubala was forced to mortgage her personal bungalow to offset the financial loss.

=== Naya Daur court case and further work (1956–1957) ===
By the mid-1950s, media reports indicated that Madhubala was planning to marry Dilip Kumar; they had publicly confirmed their relationship making an appearance at the premiere of his film, Insaniyat (1955). However, Kumar had specified that he would prefer her to retire from acting following marriage—which was strongly objected by her father; it has been suggested that Khan viewed Kumar as a threat to his primary source of income. In his 2014 autobiography, Kumar wrote that her father also attempted to integrate the actor into Madhubala's production house, an offer which he was reluctant to accept, and that Madhubala "remained neutral and unmoved by my dilemma ... my resolve by then had become strongly against a union that would not be good for either of us."

Madhubala and Kumar's relationship unraveled during the troubled production of B. R. Chopra's Naya Daur (1957). She joined the cast in 1956 and initially completed ten days of filming before a dispute arose over a scheduled outdoor shoot in Bhopal. Citing health and safety concerns, Khan refused to allow Madhubala to travel, leading Chopra to replace her with Vyjayanthimala. Khan subsequently sued Chopra for dropping his daughter on "flimsy grounds", prompting Chopra to counter-sue Khan and Madhubala for breach of contract. The court case received extensive public attention, during which Kumar testified against her in court, alleging that she acted unprofessionally and that he never respected her father in the "truest sense of the word". While Chopra eventually withdrew the charges amidst ongoing court proceedings, the lawsuit marked the end of Madhubala's years-long relationship with Kumar. According to Madhur Bhushan, Madhubala was deeply hurt by Kumar's testimony and what she perceived as disrespect of her father, although even after the break-up, "she could never forget Dilip saab".

Madhubala reduced her workload during the Naya Daur court case, withdrawing from Sohni Mahiwal and Savera, and declining Guru Dutt's Pyaasa (alongside Dilip Kumar and Nargis) after she was unable to choose between the two lead female roles. Despite her breakup with Kumar, she continued filming Mughal-e-Azam, even as production was intermittently disrupted by tensions between the two actors. During this period, Madhubala also began participating in night shoots—a practice generally discouraged by Ataullah Khan—for Mughal-e-Azam as well as Om Prakash's Gateway of India.

Among her successful releases during this time were Sohrab Modi's costume drama Raj Hath (1956) and Devendra Goel's Ek Saal (1957). Madhubala also received praise for the black comedy Gateway of India (1957), in which she played a young heiress fleeing her greedy uncle while disguised in a single "Chaplinesque" outfit throughout the film. Critic Deepa Gahlot later included Gateway of India in the book Take-2: 50 Films That Deserve a New Audience, citing it as one of Madhubala's finest performances.

=== Continued success, release of Mughal-e-Azam, and marriage (1958–1960) ===
1958 proved to be one of the most successful years of Madhubala's career, with four of her releases ranking among the year's highest-grossing films: the crime thrillers Kala Pani and Howrah Bridge, the musical Phagun and the comedy Chalti Ka Naam Gaadi. Both Kala Pani and Howrah Bridge featured her in roles considered atypical of Hindi film heroines of the period. In the former, adapted from A. J. Cronin's novel Beyond This Place, she co-starred with Dev Anand and Nalini Jaywant as a "daredevil" journalist who helps her lover (Anand) clear his father's name. Released in early 1958, the film met with critical and commercial success; Madhubala's performance was praised, though some reviewers considered her overshadowed by Jaywant.

Continuing her work on Mughal-e-Azam through 1958, Madhubala filmed the battle scenes and the musical sequence "Pyar Kiya To Darna Kya". (Note: As the musical sequence required extensive choreography, parts of it were completed using a body double due to Madhubala's lack of classical dance training; she was also medically advised against strenuous activities due to her heart condition.) She simultaneously worked on Howrah Bridge, a whodunit influenced by Hong Kong films. To help the newcomer director Shakti Samanta, Madhubala waived her fee for the role of Edna, an Anglo-Indian club dancer, opposite Ashok Kumar. Her performance of the seduction song "Aaiye Meherbaan" became particularly popular with audiences. A critic reviewing for The Bombay Chronicle described Madhubala's role as "the highlight of the picture" and considered it her best performance since Mahal. According to a retrospective assesment by Vijay Lokapally, Madhubala "blazed a trail" as Edna, for in later years "almost every heroine had to meet the challenge of equating, if not improving upon her performance".

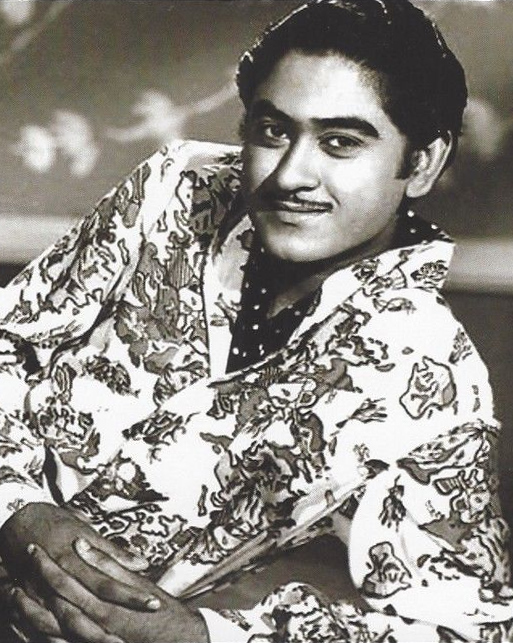
Actor-singer Kishore Kumar, who dated Madhubala for two years and married her in 1960

The production of Chalti Ka Naam Gaadi marked the beginning of Madhubala's relationship with co-star Kishore Kumar, who was then separating from his first wife, Ruma Guha Thakurta. The film, stated to be the first "full-fledged mainstream comedy" of Hindi cinema, starred Madhubala as a wealthy young woman who romances Kumar's character. It was one of the biggest box office hits of the 1950s, and its success led to further comedic collaborations between Madhubala and Kumar. Their relationship grew serious by 1959, and reports of a possible marriage attracted considerable media attention. Madhubala and Kumar's differing religious backgrounds led to speculation that Kumar would convert to Islam. In a 1959 interview with Rangbhumi, however, Madhubala stated that neither she nor her partner would require to change their religions for marriage.

Madhubala's health began declining as the filming of Mughal-e-Azam reached its final phase. For the sequences depicting her character's imprisonment, she insisted on wearing real iron chains for authenticity, which resulted in skin abrasions and necessitated intervals of bed rest. The principal photography of Mughal-e-Azam concluded in May 1959, after 500 days of filming over a period of eight years. With an estimated budget of ₹15 million, it was the most expensive Indian production at that point of time.

In August, Madhubala joined Kishore Kumar's ambitious project Suhana Geet as his leading lady. In the same year, she starred as a labour class woman in Shakti Samanta's social drama Insan Jaag Utha opposite Sunil Dutt and reunited with Raj Kapoor after a decade to play his love interest in the hit crime comedy Do Ustad. Her dual role as twin sisters with contrasting personalities in S. K. Prabhakar's Kal Hamara Hai (1959) was praised by critics, although the film itself received a lukewarm response. K. B. Goel of Thought wrote that she brought "a sensuality rare in Indian films" to the love scenes of the "seductive" sister and remained compelling in either role.

Madhubala's sickness forced a brief sabbatical in November 1959, halting production on several films including Kumar's Jhumroo and Suhana Geet. She returned to work in early 1960 for the second venture of Madhubala Private Ltd., a comedy titled Mehlon Ke Khwab; the production was handled by Ataullah Khan. Starring Madhubala alongside Kumar and Chanchal, Mehlon Ke Khwab was released in March and got panned by Baburao Patel, who bemoaned that Madhubala appeared sick and "neither acts well nor looks good".

In August 1960, Mughal-e-Azam had the widest release of any Indian film to that date. It became the highest-grossing Indian film then made, as well as the biggest success of Madhubala's career. Contemporary critics singled out her portrayal of Anarkali for particular praise: Filmfare called it the finest performance of her career, while The Indian Express wrote that the portrayal of Anarkali's changing emotions "bears testimony to the outstanding gifts of Madhubala as a natural actress" and described her performance in "Pyar Kiya To Darna Kya" as "the unforgettable hit of the picture." For her work in Mughal-e-Azam, Madhubala was nominated for the Best Actress award at the 8th Filmfare Awards. She later won the Film Journalists' Association's award for Best Actress, but did not attend the ceremony to receive the trophy.

On 16 October 1960, Madhubala and Kishore Kumar were married in a civil ceremony after a two-year courtship. Contrary to press reports, the marriage took place without either party changing religion. (Note: In 1981, Kishore Kumar denied having converted to Islam to marry Madhubala, asserting that he was "proud of [his] Hindu Brahmin roots". Madhubala's sister, Madhur Bhushan, has similarly denied claims of religious conversion.) Within the film industry, the couple was seen as a mismatch because of their contrasting temperaments. The interfaith marriage came to be strongly disapproved of by Kumar's parents, particularly his mother, who made the couple marry again in a Vedic ceremony.

The day after her marriage, Madhubala announced her retirement from cinema, although she continued to complete some projects that were already underway. While Mughal-e-Azam is often referred to as her swan song, she had further film releases that included the late 1960 musical Barsaat Ki Raat. Noted for its qawwali sequences and portrayals of headstrong women, the Muslim social film depicts an inter-class romance between Madhubala's character and an impoverished poet (played by Bharat Bhushan). Barsaat Ki Raat became the year's second highest-grossing film, trailing only Mughal-e-Azam. Box Office India retrospectively ranked Madhubala first on their "Top Actress" list of 1960, describing the consecutive blockbuster successes of Mughal-e-Azam and Barsaat Ki Raat as the peak of her career.

This continued success brought Madhubala a string of offers for more substantial roles, but her worsening heart condition forced her to decline many of them. Among the last films she completed was Kishore Kumar's Jhumroo. Initially scheduled for release in late 1960, production was delayed by her health problems and a structural collapse on the set at Filmistan Studio, which she and Kumar narrowly escaped. Madhubala also withdrew from several productions already underway, including Raj Khosla's Bombai Ka Babu and Shakti Samanta's Naughty Boy. Her unfinished scenes in Boy Friend (1961) were completed by Chanchal. Filmmaker Kishore Sahu—who said that he saw Madhubala as a potential successor to the 1940s thespian Ramola Devi—was conceiving a film project starring her that he eventually abandoned due to her illness.

=== Health decline and final work (1960–1969) ===
Madhubala's health continued to deteriorate after marriage. According to her sister Madhur Bhushan, Madhubala frequently vomited blood and suffered from breathlessness that required regular oxygen support. Cardiologist Rustom Jal Vakil offered little hope for her recovery but recommended seeking a senior medical opinion in London. She and Kumar completed Jhumroo in May 1961; the film became a box office success on its release.

Madhubala and Kumar subsequently travelled to London with physician S. V. Golwala in the hope that she could undergo specialized treatment for her heart disease. Doctors there, however, concluded that surgery was too risky. They instead advised her to avoid stress and pregnancy, and estimated that she had only one or two years to live. At the time, surgery for her congenital heart defect was not yet an established treatment. In a 1981 interview, Kumar disclosed that the terminal diagnosis drove Madhubala to depression, and that she attempted suicide during their brief stay in London. "She continued to live another seven and a half years", he said, "but died every moment".

Following their return from London, Madhubala moved into Kumar's flat on Carter Road in Bombay but soon returned to her paternal home. The couple lived separately for the remainder of her life, though Kumar visited her at times. Accounts of their marriage differ: some sources describe Kumar as devoted to her care, while others portray the relationship as increasingly strained by her health problems and his busy professional life. (Note: Kumar said that Madhubala returned to her paternal home because the noise of aircraft from a nearby airport aggravated her condition. Her sister Madhur Bhushan later alleged that Kumar had abandoned her and visited only infrequently, leaving Madhubala feeling isolated and prompting her return to her paternal home. Kumar's son, Amit, and associates including Aloke Dasgupta and Iftekhar have disputed this account, maintaining that Kumar visited regularly even after separation and remained devoted to her care. Biographers have also described arguments over rumors linking Kumar to female co-stars.)

"[I] brought her home as my wife, even though I knew she was dying from a congenital heart problem. For 9 long years, I nursed her. I watched her die before my own eyes. You can never understand what this means until you live through this yourself. She was such a beautiful woman and she died so painfully. She would rave and rant and scream in frustration. How can such an active person spend 9 long years bed-ridden? And I had to humour her all the time. That's what the doctor asked me to. That's what I did till her very last breath. I would laugh with her. I would cry with her."

— Kishore Kumar on his marriage with Madhubala

Many of Madhubala's projects, including Kumar's Suhana Geet and J. K. Nanda's Chalaak, remained incomplete due to her illness; some of these were recast or completed using body doubles. The comedy Half Ticket, which she managed to finish herself, marked her last collaboration with Kumar. The film was moderately successful on its initial release in 1962; it later attained cult popularity through re-releases in the late 1970s. Sharabi, co-starring Dev Anand, was released in 1964 after prolonged delays and became Madhubala's final release during her lifetime. A review in Shankar's Weekly observed that she appeared "a bit jaded", though the critic speculatively attributed this to the "imaginative camerawork".

In June 1966, after a temporary improvement in her condition, Madhubala resumed work on Chalaak, which required only a small amount of filming to be completed. The trade press widely publicized the effort as her "comeback". However, she suffered an episode of vomiting blood on set, forcing the production to be abandoned.

By 1967, Madhubala became largely bedridden and restricted her contact with the film industry to a few associates. She spent this time watching her films on a home projector. Bhushan recalled that her sister became "just bones and skin" during these final years, and quoted Madhubala as repeatedly saying, "Mujhe zinda rehna hai, mujhe marna nahin hai..." ("I want to live. I don't want to die"). Following a request from Madhubala, Dilip Kumar paid her a final visit; he later wrote that she appeared "frail" and that her signature "impish smile seemed such an effort".

== Death ==
On 21 February 1969, Madhubala's condition deteriorated sharply as she developed a high fever of 105 °F (41 °C) complicated by jaundice. She had a marginal improvement the following afternoon, but her health collapsed entirely by the evening of 22 February. She died at 9:30 a.m. on 23 February, nine days after her 36th birthday.

Madhubala was buried as per Sunni Muslim rites at the Juhu Muslim Cemetery in Santacruz, Bombay. Besides her family and husband, the funeral was attended by several well-known figures of the film industry, including Ashok Kumar, Nargis, Meena Kumari, Raj Kapoor, Prithviraj Kapoor, Sunil Dutt and Prem Nath. Mughal-e-Azam's music composer Naushad said, "Like Anarkali, Madhubala's share of sorrows overwhelmed her joys and alas we did not sympathize with her in life but came to mourn her death."

Madhubala's death received front-page coverage in major Indian newspapers. The Indian Express recalled her as "the most sought-after Hindi film actress" of her era, while Filmfare likened her to "a Cinderella whose clock had struck twelve too soon." Her friend Nadira, who did not attend the funeral, later said, "There are some people you want to remember in all their vivaciousness, smiling, giggling. You just don't want to see them dead. They live forever and ever. She was one of them." In May 1969, Madhubala became the first Indian star whose death was officially mourned by the Pakistani Film Producers' Association.

The swashbuckler film Jwala, which had begun production in 1958 but was repeatedly delayed by Madhubala's illness, was completed after her death using body doubles and released in 1971, marking her final screen appearance. Jwala was also her only film shot entirely in colour. (Note: A few sequences of Mughal-e-Azam were also shot in Eastmancolor, while majority portion was in black-and-white.)

In 2010, Madhubala's tomb—along with those of other industry figures such as Mohammed Rafi and Sahir Ludhianvi—was demolished to make room for new interments. Her remains were moved to an undisclosed location.

== Screen persona and reception ==
Madhubala was one of the most celebrated Indian actors of the post-independence era, a period referred to by film historians as the Golden Age of Hindi cinema. Her rise to stardom in the early 1950s coincided with the rapid expansion of the Indian film industry, and some international outlets referred to her as the industry's top star. A 1952 feature in Theatre Arts Magazine, written by David Cort, described Madhubala as "the biggest star in the world" in terms of potential audience size, noting that her local reach extended across the 420 million people of India and Pakistan. A 1955 Indian Daily Mail article observed that despite the mixed reception of many of her early films, Madhubala remained a widely publicized figure and had risen to become the "highest-paid star of the East". In the textbook A History of World Civilization (1957), American historian Max Savelle contrasted Madhubala's status as India's highest-paid film star to what he described as the traditional seclusion of women in India.

"The story of India for the past ten years may be condensed as: the war, the movie boom, independence, and Madhubala."

— American journalist David Cort, writing for Theatre Arts Magazine in 1952

Contemporaries of Madhubala regarded her beauty to be her defining feature: journalist B. K. Karanjia wrote that "none of her published photographs did full justice to her quite extraordinary beauty", while photographer J. H. Thakker said that "You could photograph her from any angle—without make-up—and still come away with a masterpiece." Editor Baburao Patel famously dubbed her the "Venus of the Indian screen". Scholar Dina Khdair noted that Madhubala achieved particular success in "sexually titillating" genres that emphasized her beauty and physical appeal, citing Mahal (1949), Sangdil (1952), Howrah Bridge (1958), and Mughal-e-Azam (1960) as examples. Retrospective news outlets also associate Madhubala's image with modern fashion trends, including off-shoulder dresses, trousers, and a distinctive wavy hairstyle, in contrast to the more traditional attire commonly worn by Hindi film actresses of the period.

While initially typecast in dramatic roles, Madhubala later successfully expanded into comedies with Mr. & Mrs. '55 (1955), becoming one of the earliest leading Hindi film actresses to dabble in the genre. Thereafter, comedy became one of Madhubala's defining strengths; the Encyclopaedia of Indian Cinema observes that her "most durable reputation rested on musical comedies". Khdair stated that her performances in films such as Mr. & Mrs. '55, Chalti Ka Naam Gaadi (1958) and Half Ticket (1962) were indicative of her modern and "Westernized" star image. According to Nandana Bose, by appearing as "both attractive and the star of a film", Madhubala preceded Sridevi as an exception to the usual caricaturization of comediennes in Hindi films.

Cort argued in 1952 that Madhubala's screen persona embodied the ideal of post-independent Indian woman, and described her as "a new type in India" and a "symbol of the advance guard of a revolution". Critic Jacob Levich described Madhubala as "a sort of sub-continental cross between Rita Hayworth and Ingrid Bergman", while film historian Bhagwan Das Garga situated Madhubala within a broader shift in Hindi cinema's depiction of femininity, in which "the vamp and the virgin merged", producing a new kind of sex symbol. According to Khdair, Madhubala's image blended "innocence" and "sensuality" and elicited comparisons with Hollywood actress Marilyn Monroe, which reinforced her eroticized screen image and brought further international attention.

Beyond India, Madhubala enjoyed transnational popularity across Asia, East Africa, and parts of Europe. Her films circulated widely in Malaya, Singapore, Indonesia, and Tanzania, where she became a well-known figure among cinema audiences during the mid-20th century. In Greece, her name inspired a nightclub in Athens and the 1959 hit song "Mantoubala" by Stelios Kazantzidis.

According to scholar Sabina Gadhihoke, during the 1950s, successful actresses such as Madhubala were often portrayed as modest and family-oriented figures in the media to enhance their relatability to mass audiences. For example, a 1954 Filmfare profile emphasized Madhubala's preference for simple clothing and dismissal of jewellery as "a waste of money", while Star-Portraits (1962) described her as "rather simple and unassuming", noting that she avoided social gatherings and devoted herself almost entirely to work. However, Madhubala's absence from the industry's social scene was publicly interpreted as either reclusiveness or arrogance, and led to an increased interest in her private life. Contemporary press stories on Madhubala often focused on her father Ataullah Khan's influence over her career as well as her romantic relationships.

Khdair argued that the truth of these media narratives mattered less than the mythology they created, in which Madhubala's beauty, romances, illness, and early death became defining elements of her public image. Khdair further contrasted Madhubala with Nargis, arguing that although both leading actresses were Muslims, the latter became associated with the nationalist Mother India archetype, while Madhubala remained constructed as a cultural "Other"—a perception she attributes to her sexualized screen roles and the sensationalist discourse surrounding her personal life. The persistence of these media narratives was reflected in works such as Mohan Deep's unauthorized biography The Mystery and Mystique of Madhubala (1996), which drew criticism from her family and former colleagues for its speculative portrayal of her personal life.

== Works and accolades ==
| Year | Award | Category | Work | Result | Notes |
|---|---|---|---|---|---|
| 1961 | Filmfare Awards | Best Actress | Mughal-e-Azam | Nominated | |
| 1961 | Film Journalists' Association of Bombay | Best Actress | Mughal-e-Azam | Won | |

== Legacy ==
In a 1977 Filmfare profile, Adi Katrak contrasted Madhubala with many earlier Hindi film actresses, writing, "Till Madhubala came most of the heroines were owly-eyed, weepy faced and had a cranky, theatrical style of acting. This girl with her infectious laughter, the twinkle in her eye and a bubbling personality was like a ray of sunshine." According to The Hundred Luminaries of Hindi Cinema (1996), Madhubala's "sultry glamour" combined with her comedic talents made her "the quintessence of a movie star". BFI's Encyclopaedia of Indian Cinema (1999) noted that, unlike many of her contemporaries who moved into character roles with age, Madhubala's early death preserved her in public memory as "the greatest and most glamorous star of the 50s Hindi musical". In 2000, India Today's millennium issue named her one of the 100 people who shaped India in the 20th century.

While Madhubala's popularity declined in the decade following her death, it revived in the 1980s with the spread of television broadcasts and home video, introducing her films to a new generation of viewers. From the mid-1990s, several biographies have been published on Madhubala. (Note: Major works include Mohan Deep's The Mystery and Mystique of Madhubala (1996); Khatija Akbar's Madhubala: Her Life, Her Films (1997); Shashikant Kinikar's Marathi-language Madhubala (2000); and Sushila Kumari's Hindi-language Madhubala: Dard Ka Safar (2010).) Her image continues to have commercial value, with sustained demand for her photographs, merchandise, and film memorabilia in India and abroad. The traditional Anarkali costumes and contemporary fashion styles she wore onscreen have influenced Indian fashion, and media outlets have described her as a fashion icon. She is remembered both as a major star of classical Hindi cinema and for her personal relationships, health problems, and early death. Madhubala has frequently been compared with Marilyn Monroe because of perceived parallels in their careers and public images, as well as their deaths at the age of 36.

Madhubala's image remains primarily associated with her looks: according to Urmila Lanba, her name has become "synonymous" with beauty in India, while authors Khatija Akbar and Mrinal Pande note the continued emulation of her distinctive appearance by Bollywood actresses. At the same time, some of her co-stars including Dilip Kumar and Shammi Kapoor argued that her looks deflected attention away from her acting talents. Kumar said in 1990 that the audiences' preoccupation with her beauty led to them "miss[ing] out on a lot of her other attributes ... As an actress, her greatest asset was her spontaneity." Veteran actress Devika Rani lamented that while Madhubala's looks were justly praised, her talents were "far superior" and remained underutilized.

Later critics have reassessed Madhubala's work. M. L. Dhawan of The Tribune argues that Madhubala could convey her character's inner emotions with subtlety and "communicate more with her delicately raised eyebrows than most performers could with a raised voice." Dinesh Raheja describes her as a "mature" and "intuitive" performer who succeeded across a variety of roles, while Debiparna Chakraborty of Outlook India observes that "Madhubala's performance style was marked by responsiveness ... an ability to react in real time to co-actors, to shift tone within a scene and to use silence as deliberately as dialogue" and that "Her comedic instinct remains one of the most underappreciated aspects of her work."

According to Pakistani film historian Mushtaq Gazdar, the South Asian actresses influenced by Madhubala's acting style include Sabiha Khanum, the "First Lady of Pakistani cinema". Author Santanu Ray Chaudhuri suggests that Madhubala's success in comedy made it "fashionable" for later leading actresses, such as Sridevi and Madhuri Dixit, to appear in comic roles.

Mughal-e-Azam (1960) remains Madhubala's best-known work, with much of her representation in South Asian popular culture deriving from the role of Anarkali. Her performance has continued to receive retrospective acclaim: in 2006, Nasreen Munni Kabir of India Today included it among the "Thirty best screen performances by Indian film actors", while Filmfare ranked it 11th on its 2010 list of the "80 Iconic Performances" of Bollywood. In the international film studies volume Close-Up: Great Cinematic Performances (2018), scholar Corey K. Creekmur analyzed Madhubala's work in Mughal-e-Azam and concluded that although the film's visual appeal is strongly tied to her "movie-star glamour", "Madhubala's complex performance is absolutely vital to securing the film's ongoing status as one of popular Indian cinema's emotional touchstones".

=== Honours and commemorations ===
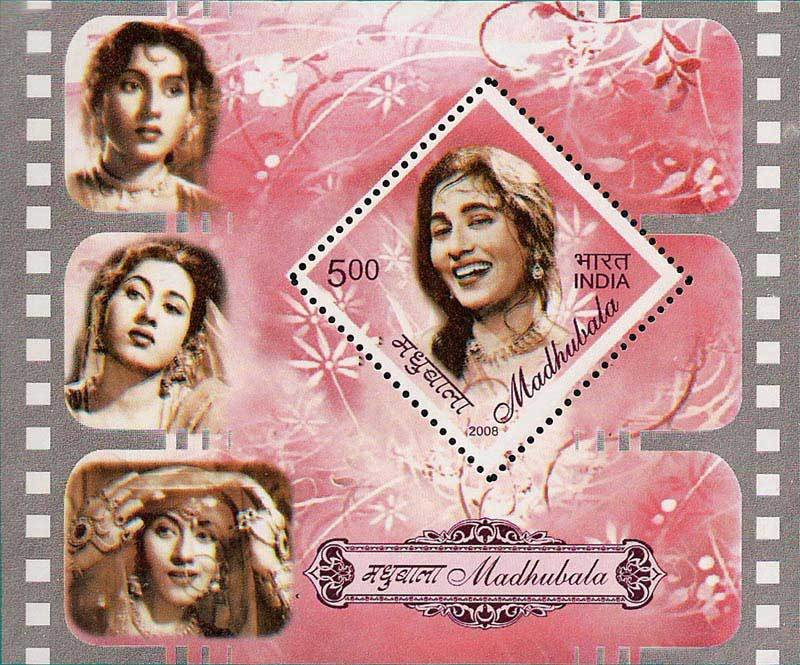
A commemorative postage stamp featuring Madhubala, issued by the India Post in 2008

Madhubala's legacy has received national and international recognition. The Greek song "Mantoubala", named after her, was performed during the closing ceremony of the 2004 Summer Olympics in Athens, Greece. In India, she was commemorated with a postage stamp issued by India Post in 2008; at the time, Nargis was the only other Indian actress to have received a similar honour. A wax sculpture of Madhubala, modeled on her appearance as Anarkali in Mughal-e-Azam (1960), was unveiled at Madame Tussauds Delhi in 2017. The following year, The New York Times published an obituary for her as part of its "Overlooked" project. On 14 February 2019, the search engine Google marked her 86th birth anniversary with a dedicated Doodle.

=== In popular culture ===
Madhubala has been referenced and portrayed in several works of popular culture. She was portrayed by Sona Mastan Mirza in Meena Kumari Ki Amar Kahani (1979). Her image appears in the opening credits of Rangeela (1995) alongside those of Dev Anand and Amitabh Bachchan. The title of the Bengali film Ami, Yasin Ar Amar Madhubala (2007) alludes to her, while Mallika Sherawat parodied her dance performance from Mughal-e-Azam in Maan Gaye Mughal-e-Azam (2008). Madhubala's life inspired the character played by Kangana Ranaut in Once Upon a Time in Mumbaai (2010). In Mere Brother Ki Dulhan (2011), the song "Madhubala", written by Irshad Kamil and picturized on Katrina Kaif, pays tribute to the actress. Payal Kapadia's documentary film A Night of Knowing Nothing (2021) features a scene in which students celebrate Madhubala's birthday by singing a song from Mughal-e-Azam; film scholar Debashree Mukherjee described the sequence as "a celebration of Madhubala's life, and of cinema itself."

In the early 2020s, filmmaker Imtiaz Ali was attempting a biographical film on Madhubala, but shut down the production due to opposition from her family. Her sister Madhur Bhushan announced plans to write a biography and produce a biopic based on her life in 2020. Variety India reported in April 2026 that Sanjay Leela Bhansali was producing a biopic directed by Jasmeet K. Reen, with Sara Arjun cast as Madhubala.

== Sources ==
- Abadzi, Helen (1967). Indoprepōn apokalypsē apo tēn India tou exōtesmou stē laikē mousa tōn Hellēnōn (in Greek). Atrapos. ISBN 9789607412775.
- Abbasi, Yasir (2018). Yeh Un Dinoñ Ki Baat Hai: Urdu Memoirs of Cinema Legends. Bloomsbury Publishing. ISBN 9789387471054.
- Akbar, Khatija (2011). 'I Want to Live': The Story of Madhubala. Hay House. ISBN 9789386832023.
- Ashokamitran (2002). My Years with Boss at Gemini Studios. Orient Longman. ISBN 9788125020875.
- Bhatia, Jagdish (1952). "Madhubala". Celebrities: A Comprehensive Biographical Thesaurus of Important Men and Women in India. Aeon.
- Bhattacharjee, Anirudha; Dhar, Parthiv (2022). Kishore Kumar: The Ultimate Biography. Harper Collins India. ISBN 9789356291713.
- Biran, Misbach Yusa (2009). Peran Pemuda Dalam Kebangkitan Film Indonesia [The Role of Youth in the Revival of Indonesian Cinema] (in Indonesian). Kementerian Negara Pemuda dan Olahraga.
- Booch, Harish S.; Doyle, Karing (1962). Star Portrait. Jai Gujerat Press. ISBN 9780670001040.
- Bose, Mihir (2006). Bollywood – A History. Tempus Publishing Ltd. ISBN 9789351940456.
- Chaudhuri, Shantanu Ray (2005). Icons from Bollywood. Puffin Books. ISBN 9780143334910.
- Cort, David (August 1952). "The Biggest Star In The World—and she's not in Beverly Hills". Theatre Arts Magazine. 36 (8): 24–26.
- Creekmur, Corey K. (2018). "Chapter 14: Madhubala in Mughal-e-Azam". In Pomerance, Murray; Stevens, Kyle (eds.). Close-Up: Great Cinematic Performances Volume 2: International. Edinburgh University Press. ISBN 9781474417037. JSTOR 10.3366/j.ctv2f4vpmp.
- Dwyer, Rachel (2011). "Bombay Gothic: On the 60th Anniversary of Kamal Amrohi's Mahal". In Dwyer, Rachel; Pinto, Jerry (eds.). Beyond the Boundaries of Bollywood: The Many Forms of Hindi Cinema. Oxford University Press. ISBN 9780198069263.
- Fair, Laura (2010). "'They stole the show!': Indian films in coastal Tanzania, 1950s–1980s". Journal of African Media Studies. 2 (1). Intellect: 91–106. doi:10.1386/jams.2.1.91/1.
- Gadhihoke, Sabina (2022). "Excavating Movie Queens". In Majumdar, Neepa; Mazumdar, Ranjani (eds.). A Companion to Indian Cinema. Publisher: John Wiley & Sons. ISBN 9781119048190.
- Gahlot, Deepa (2015). Take-2: 50 Films That Deserve a New Audience. Hay House. ISBN 9789384544850.
- Garga, Bhagwan Das (2005). Art of Cinema. Penguin UK. ISBN 9788184754315.
- Gazdar, Mushtaq (1997). Pakistan Cinema, 1947–1997. Oxford University Press. ISBN 9780195778175.
- Gulazāra; Nihalani, Govind; Chatterjee, Saibal (2003). Encyclopaedia of Hindi Cinema. Popular Prakashan. ISBN 9788179910665.
- Karanjia, B. K. (1990). Blundering in Wonderland. Vikas Publishing House. ISBN 9780706949612.
- Khan, Mohamad Hatta Azad (1994). The Malay Cinema, 1948–1989: Early History and Development in the Making of a National Cinema (PhD thesis). Sydney: University of New South Wales. hdl:1959.4/54687.
- Khdair, Dina (2020). Crossover Stars in the Hindi Film Industry: Globalizing Pakistani Identity. Taylor & Francis. ISBN 9781000069600.
- Kumar, Dilip (2014). Dilip Kumar: The Substance and the Shadow. Hay House. ISBN 9789381398968.
- Lanba, Urmila (2012). "Madhubala: Ethereal Beauty, Eternal Icon". In Patel, Bhaichand (ed.). Bollywood's Top 20: Superstars of Indian Cinema. Penguin Books. pp. 114–128. ISBN 9780670085729.
- Lawrence, Michael (2020). Indian Film Stars: New Critical Perspectives. Bloomsbury Publishing. ISBN 978-1911239932.
- Levich, Jacob (2002). "Freedom Songs". Film Comment. 38 (3): 48–51. JSTOR 43577786 – via JSTOR.
- Nayar, Sheila J. (9 February 2026). Secularism and the Hindi Film: A New Box-Office History of Bollywood. Brill. ISBN 9789004744738.
- Pandhye, Anitaa (2020). Ten Classics. Manjul Publishing. ISBN 9789389647822.
- Raheja, Dinesh; Kothari, Jitendra (1996). The Hundred Luminaries of Hindi Cinema. India Book House Publishers. ISBN 9788175080072.
- Rajadhyaksha, Ashish; Willemen, Paul (1999). Encyclopaedia of Indian Cinema. British Film Institute. ISBN 978-1135943189.
- Roy, Piyush (2019). Bollywood FAQ: All That's Left to Know About the Greatest Film Story Never Told. Rowman & Littlefield Publishers. ISBN 9781493050833.
- Saran, Sathya; Alvi, Abrar (2008). Ten Years with Guru Dutt: Abrar Alvi's Journey. Penguin Books India. ISBN 9780670082216.
- Sarkar, Bhaskar (2009). Mourning the Nation: Indian Cinema in the Wake of Partition. Duke University Press. ISBN 9780822392217.
- Savelle, Max (1957). A History of World Civilization. Vol. 2. New York: Henry Holt. OCLC 1702485.
- Salam, Ziya Us (2012). Housefull: The Golden Age of Hindi Cinema. Om Books International. ISBN 9789380070254.
- Wani, Aarti (2016). Fantasy of Modernity. Cambridge University Press. ISBN 9781107117211.
