= Beqasoor =

- Beqasoor film
- Directed by: K. Amarnath
- Written by: Madhusudan; Ehsan Rizvi
- Story by: K. Amarnath
- Produced by: M. R. Navalkar
- Starring: Madhubala; Ajit; Yakub; Gope
- Music by: Anil Biswas
- Distributed by: Madhukar Pictures
- Release date: 2 June 1950
- Country: India
- Language: Hindi
- Box office: est. ₹0.9 crore (est. ₹125.3 crore as of 2016)

Beqasoor ('Innocent') is a 1950 social drama film, directed by K. Amarnath, produced by M. R. Navalkar and starring Madhubala, Ajit and Durga Khote in lead roles. The film is a family drama and revolves around an inspector who is framed for doing black marketing and his wife who is forced to dance for money.

Beqasoor was theatrically released on 2 June 1950, and emerged as a box office success. The success of the film cemented Madhubala's position as one of the most bankable stars of those times, as well as having declared Ajit as a prominent newcomer.

== Plot ==
The film

Brij, the honest son of a principled pharmacist, refuses to participate in the black-market dealings encouraged by the unscrupulous Jaggu. Increasing tensions within the family, particularly with his greedy elder brother Ghanshyam, culminate in the division of the household. Brij leaves with his mother for Bombay, where he meets Usha, a young woman in difficult circumstances. The two fall in love, marry, and begin a modest life together. Brij eventually becomes a police officer, while Ghanshyam is drawn further into criminal activities.

Jaggu and his associates frame Brij in a bribery case by planting stolen jewellery in his home, leading to his arrest and imprisonment. Left without financial support, Usha struggles to provide for herself and her ailing mother-in-law. To sustain the household, she reluctantly takes up work as a stage singer and dancer, a profession that exposes her to social stigma and damages her reputation. Upon his release, Brij misunderstands Usha's circumstances and condemns her without knowing the sacrifices she has made.

In the climax, the conspiracy against Brij is exposed and his innocence is established. Ghanshyam repents his actions and seeks forgiveness from Brij and Usha. The family is reunited, while the true conspirators are brought to justice.

== Cast ==
- Ajit as Brij
- Madhubala as Usha
- Durga Khote as Brij's mother
- Yakub as Ghanshyam
- Gope
- Geeta Nizami as Radha
- Pramila
- Mangla
- Ramesh

== Production ==
Trilok Kapoor was the initial choice for playing the male lead. However, he was replaced by Ajit later because of date issues. After Ajit was cast in the film, director K. Amarnath suggested him to change his long name "Hamid Ali Khan" and assume the screen name "Ajit". In Beqasoor, he was credited by the screen name for the first time.

== Soundtrack ==
Composed by Anil Biswas, the soundtrack of Beqasoor consisted of eight songs. The lyrics were written by Ehsan Rizvi and Aarzoo Lakhnavi.

Song	Singer
"Matwale Nainonwale"	Lata Mangeshkar
"Huye Unse Nain Chaar"	Lata Mangeshkar
"Aayi Bhor Suhani"	Lata Mangeshkar
"Khabar Kisi Ko Nahin"	Mohammed Rafi, Mukesh, G. M. Durrani
"Chale Jaiyo Bedarda"	Rajkumari
"Ankhiyan Gulabi Jaise Madh Ki Hai Pyaliyan"	Lata Mangeshkar, Mohammed Rafi
"Hanske Na Teer Chalana"	Lata Mangeshkar, Mohammed Rafi
"Man Mein Naache"	Lata Mangeshkar

== Release ==
The film was theatrically released in Bombay on 2 June 1950, alongside another film, Rangeen Kahani.

== Reception ==
=== Critical reception ===
A Times of India review, dated 10 June 1950, carried the headline: "Orchids To Amarnath & Navalkar For Highly Delectable Fare In Madhukar's Be Qasoor".

The film was also positively reviewed in The Indian Express, which praised the "smooth flow of the story" and "the elegant acting of the young stars", singling out the performances of Durga Khote and Madhubala.

=== Box office ===
Beqasoor grossed an estimated ₹0.9 crore at the box office, and resulted in a profit of ₹0.5 crore for the producers. It ranked seven in the list of highest-grossing films of 1950. Adjusted for inflation, the film's gross was equivalent to ₹125.3 crore in 2016.
