= Mughal-e-Azam =

1960 Indian film by K. Asif

- Theatrical release poster
- Directed by: K. Asif
- Written by: Aman; Kamal Amrohi; K. Asif; Wajahat Mirza; Ehsan Rizvi
- Based on: Anārkalī by Imtiaz Ali Taj
- Produced by: Shapoorji Pallonji Mistry
- Starring: Prithviraj Kapoor; Dilip Kumar; Madhubala; Durga Khote
- Cinematography: R. D. Mathur
- Music by: Naushad
- Production company: Sterling Investment Corporation (Shapoorji Pallonji Group)
- Release date: 5 August 1960
- Running time: 197 minutes
- Country: India
- Languages: Hindi; Urdu
- Budget: ₹1.5 crore
- Box office: est. ₹16.5 crore (₹5.5 crore in India and ₹11 crore worldwide)

Mughal-e-Azam (transl. The Great Mughal) is a 1960 Indian epic historical drama film produced and directed by K. Asif. Starring Prithviraj Kapoor, Dilip Kumar, Madhubala, and Durga Khote, it follows the love affair between Mughal Prince Salim (who went on to become Emperor Jahangir) and Anarkali, a court dancer. Salim's father, Emperor Akbar, disapproves of the relationship, which leads to a war between father and son.

The development of Mughal-e-Azam began in 1944, when Asif read the 1922 play Anarkali, by playwright Imtiaz Ali Taj, which is set in the reign of Emperor Akbar (1556–1605). Production was plagued by delays and financial uncertainty. Before its principal photography began in the early 1950s, the project had lost a financier and undergone a complete change of cast. Mughal-e-Azam cost more to produce than any previous Indian motion picture; the budget for a single song sequence exceeded that typical for an entire film of the period. The soundtrack, inspired by Indian classical and folk music, comprises 12 songs voiced by playback singer Lata Mangeshkar along with Mohammed Rafi, Shamshad Begum, and classical singer Bade Ghulam Ali Khan, and is often cited among the finest in the history of Hindi cinema.

Mughal-e-Azam had the widest release of any Indian film up to that time, and patrons often queued all day for tickets. Released on 5 August 1960, it broke box office records in India and became the highest-grossing Indian film, a distinction it held for 15 years. The accolades awarded to the film include one National Film Award and three Filmfare Awards at the 8th Filmfare Awards. Roughly 30 minutes were filmed in colour; decades after its release Mughal-e-Azam was the first black-and-white Hindi film to be fully digitally coloured, and the first in any language to be given a theatrical re-release. The colour version, released on 12 November 2004, was also a commercial success.

The film is widely considered to be a milestone for its genre, earning praise from critics for its grandeur and attention to detail, and the performances of its cast (especially that of Madhubala, who earned a nomination for the Filmfare Award for Best Actress). Film scholars have welcomed its portrayal of enduring themes, but question its historical accuracy. It was the most expensive Indian film made until then.

== Plot ==
Anxious over not having a male heir to succeed him, Mughal Emperor Akbar undertakes a pilgrimage to a holy shrine. His prayers are answered when his wife, Empress Jodhaa Bai, gives birth to a son. Overjoyed by the news, which is delivered to him by a palace maid, Akbar gifts her his royal ring and vows to grant any single wish she desires in the future.

The young prince, Salim, grows up pampered and self-indulgent. To instill discipline and courage, Akbar sends his son to the frontlines of war. Fourteen years later, Salim returns to the court of Agra as a distinguished military commander and an accomplished warrior. Upon his return, he deeply falls in love with a tawaif named Nadira, the daughter of the very maid who brought the news of his birth to Akbar years earlier. Recognizing her remarkable beauty and grace, Akbar renames her Anarkali (transl. Pomegranate Blossom).

Bahar, a high-ranking court dancer, soon discovers their clandestine affair. Harbouring ill intentions to wed Salim to become the Empress, an envious Bahar exposes Salim's forbidden relationship with Anarkali to Akbar. Outraged by the prospect of a common court dancer entering the royal family, Akbar vehemently forbids the romance and orders Anarkali's imprisonment. When Akbar orders her to renounce her love for Salim, she steadfastly refuses out of her loyalty to Salim.

Enraged by his father's cruelty, Salim raises a rebel army to revolt against his father and rescue Anarkali. The conflict ends in Salim's defeat. Akbar sentences Salim to death on charges of treason, but agrees to spare him from decree if Anarkali, who has escaped from the prison, surrenders herself to face death in Salim's place. Learning of the ultimatum, Anarkali surrenders herself to save the prince's life.

Subsequently, Akbar condemns Anarkali to death by immurement. As her final request, she begs to spend a few hours with Salim as his symbolic wife. Akbar grants the request on the condition that she drugs Salim, ensuring he remains unconscious and unable to stop the execution.

Just as the final bricks are being laid around Anarkali, her mother approaches Akbar with the royal ring and invokes his long-forgotten promise. Bound by his dedication to justice, Akbar decides to honour the vow by secretly arranging for Anarkali and her mother to escape through a hidden passage behind the wall into a permanent exile. However, he demands that they must live in complete obscurity, ensuring Salim spends the rest of his life believing his true love is dead.

== Cast ==
- Prithviraj Kapoor as Emperor Akbar
- Dilip Kumar as Salim
- Madhubala as Anarkali
- Durga Khote as Empress Mariam-uz-Zamani (Jodha Bai)
- Nigar Sultana as Bahar
- Ajit as Durjan Singh
- Kumar as Sculptor
- Murad as Raja Man Singh
- Jillo Bai as Anarkali's mother
- Vijayalaxmi as a maid
- S. Nazir as a general
- Sheila Dalaya (known as Sheela Delaya) as Suraiya
- Surinder as Tansen
- Johnny Walker as a tawaif
- Jalal Agha as Salim (young)
- Baby Tabassum as a tawaif
- Gopi Krishna as a Kathak dancer

== Production ==
=== Development ===
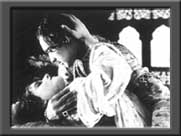
Anarkali, the 1928 silent film based on the tale of Anarkali and Salim

The Urdu dramatist Imtiaz Ali Taj wrote a play about the love story of Salim and Anarkali in 1922, based more on a 16th-century legend than on fact. A stage version was soon produced, and screen versions followed. Ardeshir Irani made a silent film, Anarkali, in 1928, and remade it with sound in 1935. In the early 1940s, the tale of Anarkali inspired producer Shiraz Ali Hakeem and young director K. Asif (Karimuddin Asif) to make another film adaptation which they would title Mughal-e-Azam. They recruited four Urdu writers to develop the screenplay and dialogue: Aman (Zeenat Aman's father, also known as Amanullah Khan), Wajahat Mirza, Kamaal Amrohi, and Ehsan Rizvi. It is not known how the writers collaborated or shared out their work, but in 2010 The Times of India said that their "mastery over Urdu's poetic idiom and expression is present in every line, giving the film, with its rich plots and intricate characters, the overtones of a Shakespearean drama." As the script neared completion, Asif cast Chandra Mohan, D. K. Sapru, and Nargis for the roles of Akbar, Salim, and Anarkali, respectively. Shooting started in 1946 in Bombay Talkies studio.

The project faced multiple hurdles, which forced its temporary abandonment. The political tensions and communal rioting surrounding India's 1947 partition and independence stalled production. Shortly after partition, Shiraz Ali migrated to Pakistan, leaving Asif without a financier. The actor Chandra Mohan suffered a heart attack and died in 1949. Shiraz Ali had previously suggested that business tycoon Shapoorji Pallonji could finance the film. Although Pallonji knew nothing about film production, in 1950 he agreed to finance the film because of his interest in the history of Akbar. Production was then restarted with a new cast.

Believing that the film had been cancelled, Kamal Amrohi, one of the scriptwriters who was also a director, planned to make a film on the same subject himself. When confronted by Asif, he agreed to shelve the project. Another unrelated film production based on the same stage play was Nandlal Jaswantlal's Anarkali, starring Bina Rai and Pradeep Kumar, which became the highest grossing Hindi film of 1953.

=== Casting ===
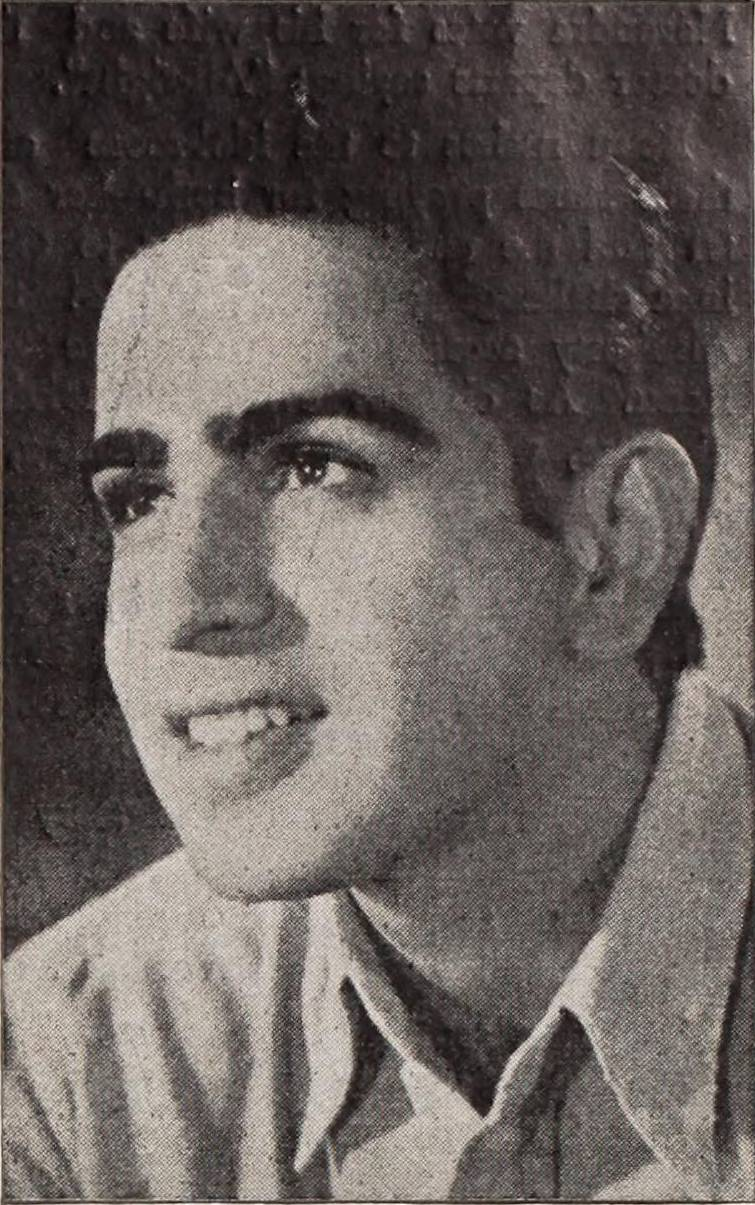
Actor Dilip Kumar, pictured above in 1944, plays the role of Prince Salim.

Asif had initially rejected Dilip Kumar for the part of Prince Salim. Kumar was reluctant to act in a period film, but accepted the role upon the insistence of the film's producer. According to Kumar, "Asif trusted me enough to leave the delineation of Salim completely to me." Kumar faced difficulty while filming in Rajasthan owing to the heat and the body armour he wore. The part of Anarkali had first been offered to Nutan, who declined it; Suraiya was considered for the role but eventually it went to Madhubala, who had been longing for a significant role. Upon signing the film, Madhubala was advancely paid a sum of ₹1 lakh, which was the highest for any actor/actress at that time. She suffered from congenital heart disease, which was one of the reasons why at times she fainted on set; she also endured skin abrasions while filming the prison sequences, but was determined to finish the film.

To become the character of Emperor Akbar, Prithviraj Kapoor was reported to have "relied completely on the script and director". Prior to make-up, Kapoor would declare, "Prithviraj Kapoor ab jaa rahaa hai" ("Prithviraj Kapoor is now going"); after make-up, he would announce, "Akbar ab aa rahaa hai" ("Akbar is now coming"). Kapoor faced difficulty with his heavy costumes, and suffered blisters on his feet after walking barefoot in the desert for a sequence. Lance Dane, a photographer who was on set during the filming, recalled that Kapoor struggled to remember his lines in some scenes; he mentioned one scene in particular that Kapoor required 19 takes to get right. At the time of filming, Kapoor who was on a diet, was told by Asif to regain the lost weight for his portrayal of Akbar. Durga Khote was cast as Akbar's wife Jodhabai, and Nigar Sultana as the dancer Bahar. Zakir Hussain, who later became a tabla maestro, had initially been considered for the part of the young Prince Salim, but it became the debut role of Jalal Agha, who later performed on the song "Mehbooba Mehbooba" from Sholay (1975).

=== Design ===
The production design of the film, led by art director M. K. Syed, was extravagant, and some sets took six weeks to erect. The film, mostly shot in studio sets designed to represent the interior of a Mughal palace, featured opulent furnishings and water features such as fountains and pools, generating the feel of a Hollywood historical epic of the period. The song "Pyar Kiya To Darna Kya" was filmed in Mohan Studios on a set built as a replica of the Sheesh Mahal in the Lahore Fort. The set was noted for its size, measuring 150 feet (46 m) in length, 80 feet (24 m) in breadth and 35 feet (11 m) in height. A much-discussed aspect was the presence of numerous small mirrors made of Belgian glass, which were crafted and designed by workers from Firozabad. The set took two years to build and cost more than ₹1.5 million (valued at about US$314,000 in 1960), (Note: The exchange rate in 1960 was 4.77 Indian rupees (₹) per 1 US dollar (US$).) more than the budget of an entire Hindi film at the time. The film's financiers feared bankruptcy as a result of the high cost of production.

Artisans from across India were recruited to craft the props. The costumes were designed by Makhanlal and Company, and Delhi-based tailors skilled in zardozi embroidery stitched the Mughal costume. The footwear was ordered from Agra, the jewellery was made by goldsmiths in Hyderabad, the crowns were designed in Kolhapur, and blacksmiths from Rajasthan manufactured the armoury (which included shields, swords, spears, daggers, and armour). The zardozi on costumes were also stitched by designers from Surat. A statue of Lord Krishna, to which Jodhabai prayed, was made of gold. In the scenes involving an imprisoned Anarkali, real chains were placed on Madhubala. The battle sequence between Akbar and Salim reportedly featured 2,000 camels, 400 horses, and 8,000 troops, mainly from the Indian Army's Jaipur cavalry, 56th Regiment. Dilip Kumar has spoken of the intense heat during filming of the sequence in the desert of Rajasthan, wearing full armour.

=== Principal photography ===
Principal photography for Mughal-e-Azam began in the early 1950s. Each sequence was reportedly filmed three times, as the film was being produced in Hindi/Urdu, Tamil, and English. The film was eventually dubbed in Tamil and released in 1961 as Akbar, but that version's commercial failure resulted in the abandonment of the planned English dubbing, for which British actors were considered. Asif was accompanied by an extensive crew, which included his assistant directors S. T. Zaidi, Khalid Akhtar, Surinder Kapoor (assisting primarily for the English version), and five others. Additional crew members included cinematographer R. D. Mathur, choreographer Lachhu Maharaj, production manager Aslam Noori, cameraman M. D. Ayub, editor Dharamavir, makeup artists P. G. Joshi and Abdul Hamid, and sound director Akram Shaikh.

Some film sequences were shot with up to 14 cameras, significantly more than the norm at that time. There were many difficulties with the film's lighting; cinematographer Mathur reportedly took eight hours to light a single shot. In total, 500 days of shooting were needed, compared to a normal schedule of 60 to 125 shooting days at the time. Owing to the very large size of the Sheesh Mahal set, the lighting was provided by the headlights of 500 trucks and about 100 reflectors. The presence of the mirrors on the set caused problems, as they sparkled under the lights. Foreign consultants, including British director David Lean, told Asif to forget the idea since they felt that it was impossible to film the scene under the intense glare. Asif confined himself to the set with the lighting crew, and subsequently overcame the problem by covering all the mirrors with a thin layer of wax, thereby subduing their reflectivity. Mathur also used strategically placed strips of cloth to implement "bounce lighting", which reduced the glare.

Such was the all-round commitment that nobody saw the delay as tiresome. We were experienced enough to know that a film involving such overwhelming craftsmanship, minute detailing, massive gathering of artistes and unit hands, strenuous schedules with large units of artistes and trained animals, day and night shoots cannot be a simple affair.

— Dilip Kumar, on the duration of filming

A number of problems and production delays were encountered during filming, to the extent that at one point Asif considered abandoning the project. Kumar defended the long duration of filming, invoking the massive logistics of the film and explaining that the entire cast and crew were "acutely conscious of the hard work [they] would have to put in, as well as the responsibility [they] would have to shoulder."

The production also suffered from financial problems, and Asif exceeded the budget on a number of occasions. The final budget of the film is a subject of debate. Some sources state that Mughal-e-Azam cost ₹10.5 million to produce (about US$2.25 million at the time) while others state that it cost ₹15 million (about $3 million). This made Mughal-e-Azam the most expensive Indian film of the period. A number of estimates put the film's inflation-adjusted budget at ₹500 million to ₹2 billion. The budget situation strained the relationship between Asif and Pallonji, while the production also faced troubled relationships among other crew members; differences crept up between Asif and Kumar when the former married the latter's sister. Another source of trouble was the romantic relationship and ultimate break-up of Kumar and Madhubala, who had been dating for nine years.

=== Post-production ===
Sohrab Modi's Jhansi Ki Rani (1953) was the first Indian film to be shot in colour, and by 1957, colour production had become increasingly common. Asif filmed one reel of Mughal-e-Azam, including the song "Pyar Kiya To Darna Kya", in Technicolor. Impressed by the result, he filmed three more reels in Technicolor, near the story's climax. After seeing them, he sought a complete re-shoot in Technicolor, but financiers refused. Asif subsequently released Mughal-e-Azam partially coloured, although he still hoped to see the full film in colour.

By the end of filming, more than a million feet of negative had been used, necessitating significant editing. A number of songs were edited out owing to the running time, which in the end was 197 minutes. Almost half of the songs recorded for the film were left out of the final version.

== Themes ==
Mughal-e-Azam is a family history highlighting the differences between father and son, duty to the public over family, and the trials and tribulations of women, particularly of courtesans. According to Rachel Dwyer, author of the book Filming the Gods: Religion and Indian Cinema, the film highlights religious tolerance between Hindus and Muslims. Examples include the scenes of Hindu Queen Jodhabai's presence in the court of the Muslim Akbar, the singing of a Hindu devotional song by Anarkali, and Akbar's participation in the Janmashtami celebrations, during which Akbar is shown pulling a string to rock a swing with an idol of Krishna on it. Film critic Mukul Kesavan has remarked that he was unable to recall a single other film about Hindu-Muslim love in which the woman (Jodhabai) is Hindu. Scholars Bhaskar and Allen described the film as a tableau vivant of "Islamicate culture", evidenced in its ornate sets, musical sequences such as the qawwali scene, and chaste Urdu dialogues. Throughout the film there is a distinct depiction of Muslims as the ruling class who not only dressed differently but also spoke in complex Persianised dialogue. They are made to appear "distinct and separate from the mainstream."

Film scholar Stephen Teo posits that Mughal-e-Azam is a "national allegory", a stylistic way of appropriating history and heritage to emphasise the national identity. He believes the arrogance of Bahar represents the power of the state and that Anarkali's emotion, which is highly personal, represents the private individual. Teo states that the theme of romantic love defeating social class difference and power hierarchy, as well as the grandeur of the filming, contribute to the film's attractiveness. Author Ashis Nandy has commented on the poetic quality of the dialogue, saying that "the characters of Mughal-e-Azam do not just speak – they refine communication, they distil it, they crystallize it into many faceted glittering gems, they make poetry of ordinary language." Gowri Ramnarayan of The Hindu has also emphasised the power of the dialogues in the film, in that they "create not only the ambiance of this period drama, but also etch character and situation. Every syllable breathes power and emotion."

Philip Lutgendorf, a scholar at the University of Iowa, has stated that while the theme of the conflict between passionate individual love and family duty may be very common in Hindi film making, with endless cinematic permutations, K. Asif's "excessive elaboration of the theme remains in a class by itself." Further, Emperor Akbar struggles between his personal desires and his duties to the nation. Ashis Nandy noted that apart from the conflict between Akbar and his son, there is also an "unwritten alliance" between Akbar and Bahar that compounds the problems of Anarkali. He also thought it highlighted the "idea of justice and the notion of unconditional love" to uphold tradition. The song "Pyar Kiya To Darna Kya" sung by Anarkali was an indication of her defiance of societal norms. A major difference from the original story is that while the earlier Anarakali films based on Imtiaz Ali Taj's story ended as tragedies, K. Asif created a relatively happy ending in that Akbar gives amnesty to Anarkali by allowing her to escape through a secret route of tunnels below a false bottom of her prison wall, although his son is made to suffer in believing her to have perished.

== Historical inaccuracies ==
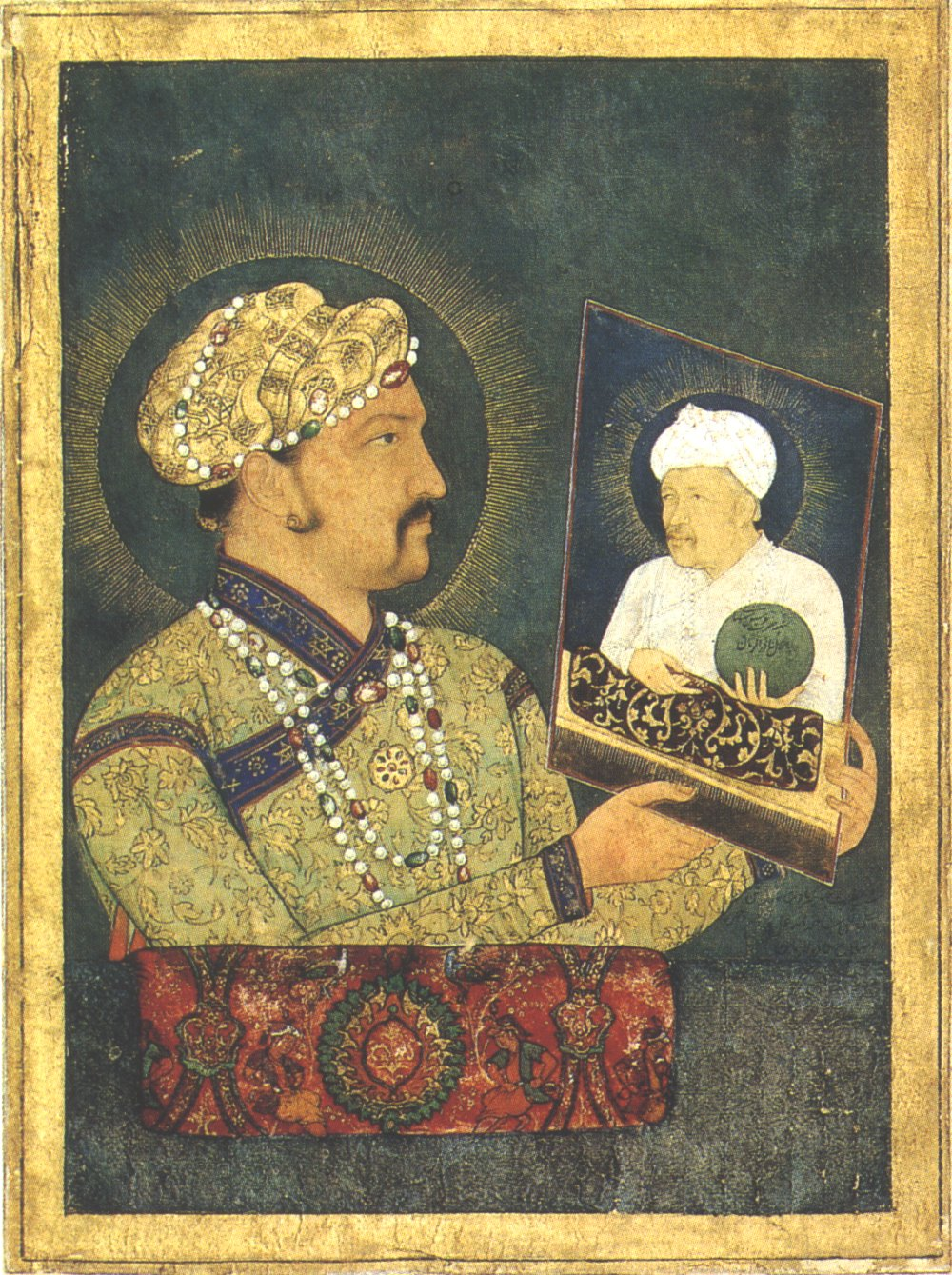
Jahangir with a Portrait of Akbar, c. 1614. Jahangir (Salim) and Akbar play central characters in the film.

The film is based on a legend, but it is given credence by at least two texts that assert Anarkali's existence during the historical period of Emperor Akbar (1556–1605). One of the books states that in 1615 a marble tomb was built on Anarkali's grave in Lahore by Salim, when he had become Emperor Jahangir. On the tomb is a Persian inscription that reads: Ta Kiyamat shukr geom kardgate khwesh ra, Aah garman bez benaam roo-e yare khwesh ra ("Ah! could I behold the face of my love once more, I would give thanks to my God until the day of resurrection"). The author of the stage play on which the film is based, Imtiaz Ali Taj, believed that the legend had no historical base, but historians have suggested that Anarkali may have been a painter, a dancer, or a courtesan, or one of Akbar's wives and the mother of Salim's half-brother Prince Daniyal. While an earlier film version of the story, Anarkali (1952), contained a disclaimer stating that the story had no foundation in history, Mughal-e-Azam made no such claim.

Mughal-e-Azam takes numerous liberties with historical fact. Historian Alex von Tunzelmann says that although the real Salim was a heavy consumer of alcohol and opium from the age of 18, he was not necessarily a mischievous boy, as depicted in the film. When the film's Salim returns from his time in the military, he is depicted as a gentle and romantic hero, in contrast to the real Salim, who was documented as a brutal drunk who would often beat people to death. The real Salim did lead a rebellion against his father, tried to replace him as emperor, and had Akbar's friend Abu al-Fazl murdered in 1602, but the film ascribes these actions to his desire to marry Anarkali, which is historically inaccurate. Further, there were also discrepancies in sets, costumes, and music of the film. The Sheesh Mahal, actually the royal bath of the queen, was depicted in the film as a dancing hall, and much larger. Music and dancing styles from the 19th century were depicted, although the story takes place in the 16th century. For example, thumri, a semi-classical music form developed in the 19th century, is adopted in a dance sequence in Kathak style, which is a 16th-century dance form.

== Music ==
The soundtrack was composed by music director Naushad, and the lyrics were written by Shakeel Badayuni. After conceiving the idea of the film, Asif visited Naushad and handed him a briefcase containing money, telling him to make "memorable music" for Mughal-e-Azam. Offended by the explicit notion of money as a means of gaining quality, Naushad threw the notes out of the window, to the surprise of his wife. She subsequently made peace between the two men, and Asif apologised. With this, Naushad accepted the offer to compose the film's soundtrack. As with most of Naushad's soundtracks, the songs of Mughal-e-Azam were heavily inspired by Indian classical music and folk music, particularly ragas such as Darbari, Durga, used in the composition of "Pyar Kiya To Darna Kya", and Kedar, used in "Bekas Pe Karam Keejeye". He also made extensive use of western classical orchestras and choruses to add grandeur to the music. The soundtrack contained a total of 12 songs, which were rendered by playback singers and classical music artists. These songs account for nearly one third of the film's running time.

== Marketing ==
The painter G. Kamble was lured away from V. Shantaram's Rajkamal Kalamandir to paint the posters. Kamble also created cinema displays at Maratha Mandir theatre. Asif needed to buy all available stocks of Winsor & Newton paint in India at a cost of ₹6 lakh to enable Kamble to produce quality art for his hoardings. Kamble, who was offered a large sum of ₹8 lakh for his work on the stills of Mughal-e-Azam, did not receive any compensation in the end due to fraud.

== Release ==
"Asif's logic was very clear – he had made a film which everyone associated with it would be proud of for generations. And he was proved right."

— K.K. Rai of Stardust, on Asif's quoted distributor prices.

At the time of the release of Mughal-e-Azam, a typical Hindi film would garner a distribution fee of ₹300,000–400,000 (about US$63,000–84,000 in 1960) per territory. Asif insisted that he would sell his film to the distributors at no less than ₹700,000 per territory. Subsequently, the film was actually sold at a price of ₹1.7 million (US$356,000) per territory, surprising Asif and the producers. Thus, it set the record for the highest distribution fee received by any Hindi film at that time.

The premiere of Mughal-e-Azam was held at the then-new 1,100-capacity Maratha Mandir cinema in Mumbai. Mirroring the nature of the film, the cinema's foyer had been decorated to resemble a Mughal palace, and a 40-foot (12 m) cut-out of Prithviraj Kapoor was erected outside it. The Sheesh Mahal set was transported from the studio to the cinema, where ticket holders could go inside and experience its grandeur. Invitations to the premiere were sent as "royal invites" shaped like scrolls, which were written in Urdu and made to look like the Akbarnama, the official chronicle of the reign of Akbar. The premiere was held amidst great fanfare, with large crowds and an extensive media presence, in addition to hosting much of the film industry, although Dilip Kumar did not attend the event owing to his dispute with Asif. The film's reels arrived at the premiere cinema atop a decorated elephant, accompanied by the music of bugles and shehnai.

== Reception ==
=== Box office ===
The day before bookings for the film opened, a reported crowd of 100,000 gathered outside the Maratha Mandir to buy tickets. The tickets, the most expensive for a Hindi film at that time, were dockets containing text, photographs and trivia about the film, and are now considered collector's items. They sold for ₹100 (valued at about US$21 in 1960), compared to the usual price of ₹1.5 (US$0.31). Bookings experienced major chaos, to the extent that police intervention was required. It was reported that people would wait in queues for four to five days, and would be supplied food from home through their family members. Subsequently, the Maratha Mandir closed bookings for three weeks.

Mughal-e-Azam was released on 5 August 1960 in 150 cinemas across the country, establishing a record for the widest release for a Hindi film. It became a major commercial success, earning ₹4 million (US$839,000) in the first week, eventually earning a net revenue of ₹55 million (US$11,530,000), and generating a profit of ₹30 million for the producers. Mughal-e-Azam also experienced a long theatrical run, screening to full capacity at the Maratha Mandir for three years. The film thus became the highest-grossing Hindi film by surpassing Mother India (1957), and retained this record until Sholay (1975) surpassed its net revenue. In terms of gross revenue, Mughal-e-Azam earned ₹110 million ($23.11 million).

In 2017, Box Office India estimated footfalls of more than 100 million tickets sold at the domestic box office, above films such as Hum Aapke Hain Koun (1994) and Baahubali 2 (2017). In 2024, DNA India estimated Mughal-e-Azam sold between 120 million and 150 million tickets worldwide, while Hindustan Times estimated that the film sold over 150 million tickets worldwide.

According to Ziya Us Salam of The Hindu in 2009, Mughal-e-Azam was the highest-grossing Hindi film of all time if adjusted for inflation. According to Box Office India in 2008, the film's adjusted net revenue would have amounted to ₹1,327 million, ranking it as an "All-Time Blockbuster". According to financial newspaper Mint, the adjusted net income of Mughal-e-Azam is equivalent to ₹13 billion ($200 million) in 2017. According to Hindustan Times, the film's inflation-adjusted worldwide gross revenue is equivalent to ₹40 billion ($473 million) in 2024, making it the highest-grossing Indian film adjusted for inflation.

=== Critical reception ===
Mughal-e-Azam received universal acclaim from Indian critics; every aspect of the film was praised. A review dated 26 August 1960 in Filmfare called it a "history-making film ... the work of a team of creative artists drawn from different spheres of the art world". It was also described as "a tribute to imagination, hard work and lavishness of its maker, Mr. Asif. For its grandeur, its beauty, and then performances of the artists it should be a landmark in Indian films." Another contemporary review from The Indian Express focused on the acting and dancing "gifts" of Madhubala.

Since 2000, reviewers have described the film as a "classic", "benchmark", or "milestone" in the history of Indian cinema. Rotten Tomatoes has sampled 13 reviewers and judged 92% of them to be positive, with an average rating of 7.9 out of 10. In 2011, Anupama Chopra called it "the best Hindi film ever made" and "the apotheosis of the Hindi film form", noting specifically the performances, father-son drama and song sequences. Dinesh Raheja of Rediff called the film a must-see classic, saying "a work of art is the only phrase to describe this historical whose grand palaces-and-fountains look has an epic sweep and whose heart-wrenching core of romance has the tenderness of a feather's touch." Sujata Gupta of Planet Bollywood gave the film nine out of ten stars, calling it a "must see" that "has captured interest of people over generations".

K. K. Rai, in his review for Stardust stated, "it can be said that the grandeur and vintage character of Mughal-e-Azam cannot be repeated, and it will remembered as one of the most significant films made in this country." Ziya Us Salam of The Hindu described Mughal-e-Azam as a film people will want to watch over and over again. Raja Sen of Rediff compared the film to Spartacus (1960) and said, "Mughal-e-Azam is awesomely, stunningly overwhelming, a magnificent spectacle entirely free of CGI and nonlinear gimmickry, a gargantuan feat of ... of ... well, of Mughal proportions!" Laura Bushell of the BBC rated the film four out of five stars, considering it to be a "benchmark film for both Indian cinema and cinema grandeur in general", and remarking that Mughal-E-Azam was an epic film in every way. Naman Ramachandran, reviewing the film for the British Film Institute, noted the depiction of religious tolerance and said the film had a tender heart.

Nasreen Munni Kabir, author of The Immortal Dialogue of K. Asif's Mughal-e-Azam, compared the film to the Koh-i-Noor diamond for its enduring worth to Indian cinema. Outlook, in 2008, and Hindustan Times, in 2011, both declared that the scene in which Salim brushes Anarkali with an ostrich feather was the most erotic and sensuous scene in the history of Indian cinema.

=== Awards ===
At the 1961 National Film Awards, Mughal-e-Azam won the National Film Award for Best Feature Film in Hindi. In the 1961 Filmfare Awards, Mughal-e-Azam was nominated in seven categories: Best Film, Best Director (Asif), Best Actress (Madhubala), Best Playback Singer (Mangeshkar), Best Music (Naushad), Best Cinematography (Mathur), and Best Dialogue (Aman, Wajahat Mirza, Kamaal Amrohi, and Ehsan Rizvi), winning the awards for Best Film, Best Cinematography, and Best Dialogue.

Award	Category	Nominee	Result
8th National Film Awards	Best Feature Film in Hindi	K. Asif	Won
8th Filmfare Awards	Best Film	K. Asif	Won
8th Filmfare Awards	Best Director	K. Asif	Nominated
8th Filmfare Awards	Best Actor	Dilip Kumar	Nominated
8th Filmfare Awards	Best Actress	Madhubala	Nominated
8th Filmfare Awards	Best Supporting Actor	Prithviraj Kapoor	Nominated
8th Filmfare Awards	Best Supporting Actress	Durga Khote	Nominated
8th Filmfare Awards	Best Music Director	Naushad	Nominated
8th Filmfare Awards	Best Lyricist	Shakeel Badayuni for "Pyar Kiya To Darna Kya"	Nominated
8th Filmfare Awards	Best Playback Singer	Lata Mangeshkar for "Pyar Kiya To Darna Kya"	Nominated
8th Filmfare Awards	Best Dialogue	Aman, Wajahat Mirza, Kamal Amrohi, Ehsan Rizvi	Won
8th Filmfare Awards	Best Cinematography (B/W)	R. D. Mathur	Won

== Colourisation ==
A comparison between the original (above) and colourised version

Mughal-e-Azam was the first black-and-white Hindi film to be digitally coloured and the first to be given a theatrical re-release. The Sterling Investment Corporation, the negative rights owner and an arm of the Shapoorji Pallonji Group, undertook restoration and colourisation of Mughal-e-Azam and assigned Deepesh Salgia as Project Designer and Director. They initially approached Hollywood executives for help, but found the sales quotations, ranging from $12–15 million, too high. In 2002, Umar Siddiqui, managing director of the Indian Academy of Arts and Animation (IAAA), proposed to enhance it digitally at a fraction of the cost. To convince the Shapoorji Pallonji Group, one of India's wealthiest companies, of the commercial viability of the project, the IAAA colourised a four-minute clip and showed it to them. They approved and gave the project the go-ahead. Shapoorji Mistry, grandson of producer Shapoorji Pallonji Mistry, thought it a fitting tribute to complete his grandfather's unfinished dream of colourising the entire film.

The first step towards colourisation was the restoration of the original negatives, which were in poor condition owing to extensive printing of the negative during the original theatrical release. Costly and labour-intensive restoration was essential before colourisation could be carried out. The negative was cleaned of fungal growth, damaged portions were restored, and missing parts of frames were re-instated. After cleaning, each of the 300,000 frames of the negative was scanned into a 10 megabytes-sized file and then was digitally restored. The entire restoration work was undertaken by Acris Lab, Chennai. The dialogues in the original soundtrack were also in a bad state of preservation, which necessitated having the sound cleaned at Chace Studio in the United States. The background score and the entire musical track was recreated by Naushad and Uttam Singh. For the songs, the original voices of the singers like Lata Mangeshkar, Bade Ghulam Ali Khan and Mohammed Rafi were extracted from the original mixed track and the same were recreated with re-recorded score in 6.1 surround sound.

The process of colourisation was preceded by extensive research. The art departments visited museums and studied the literature for background on the typical colours of clothing worn at that time. Siddiqui studied the technology used for the colourisation of black-and-white Hollywood classics. The team also approached a number of experts for guidance and suggestions, including Dilip Kumar, production designer Nitin Chandrakant Desai, and a historian from the Jawaharlal Nehru University in Delhi. To undertake the colourisation, Siddiqui brought together a team of around 100 individuals, including computer engineers and software professionals, and organised a number of art departments. The entire project was co-ordinated by Deepesh Salgia, who partnered with companies including Iris Interactive and Rajtaru Studios to execute the colourisation. The task was controlled and supervised by the producers, who received daily updates and progress reports.

The colourisation team spent 18 months developing software for colouring the frames, called "Effects Plus", which was designed to accept only those colours whose hue would match the shade of grey present in the original film. This ensured that the colours added were as close to the real colour as possible; the authenticity of the colouring was later verified when a costume used in the film was retrieved from a warehouse, and its colours were found to closely match those in the film. Every shot was finally hand-corrected to perfect the look. The actual colourisation process took a further 10 months to complete. Siddiqui said that it had "been a painstaking process with men working round the clock to complete the project." The exact cost of the colourisation is disputed, with a wide variety of estimates ranging from ₹20 million (US$210,000) to ₹50 million, or ₹100 million.

== Re-releases ==
The film's colour version was released theatrically on 12 November 2004, in 150 prints across India, 65 of which were in Maharashtra. The new release premiered at the Eros Cinema in Mumbai. Dilip Kumar, who had not attended the original premiere, was in attendance. The colour version was edited to a running time of 177 minutes, as compared to the original version's 197 minutes. The new release also included a digital reworked soundtrack, produced with the assistance of Naushad, the original composer. It became the 19th highest grossing Hindi film of the year

Mughal-e-Azam became the first full-length feature film colourised for a theatrical re-release; although some Hollywood films had been colourised earlier, they were only available for home media. It was subsequently selected for seven international film festivals, including the 55th Berlin International Film Festival. Upon release, the film drew crowds to the cinemas, with an overall occupancy of 90 per cent. Subsequently, it completed a 25-week run. While some critics complained that the colours were "psychedelic" or "unnatural", others hailed the effort as a technological achievement. Film critic Kevin Thomas of the Los Angeles Times remarked that while colourising was not a good idea for most black-and-white classics, it was perfect in this particular instance. He compared it to films by Cecil B. DeMille and to Gone With the Wind (1939) for its larger-than-life storytelling. The Guardian said that although the new version was an improvement, "the fake colours tend to look flat and brash, detracting from cinematographer RD Mathur's elegantly composed shots." The BBC's Jaspreet Pandohar, observing that the film was "restored in appealing candy-colours and high quality sound", considered it a "cross between Gone With the Wind and Ben-Hur". Other critics have said that they prefer the black and white version.

In 2006, Mughal-e-Azam became the fourth Indian film certified for showing in Pakistan since the 1965 ban on Indian cinema, and was released with a premiere in Lahore. It was distributed by Nadeem Mandviwala Entertainment, at the request of Asif's son, Akbar Asif.

== Legacy ==
Mughal-e-Azam is one of only two films directed by Asif; one of his unfinished projects was released posthumously as a tribute. Over time the title has become part of Hindi film vernacular, used to describe a project that is taking too long to complete. Art director Omung Kumar, who has designed sets for major Indian films such as Black (2005) and Saawariya (2007), said that he and others in his field look to Mughal-e-Azam as a source of inspiration for art direction. It has also been used as a model for the perfect love story, requiring directors to ensure lovers overcome obstacles. Following her success in the film, Madhubala could have gone on to land further major roles, but she was advised not to overwork owing to her heart condition, and had to withdraw from some productions that were already underway.

The Guardian in 2013 cited Mughal-e-Azam as a "landmark of cinema" despite its historical inaccuracies, and the BBC stated in 2005 that it is "widely considered one of Bollywood's most iconic films". Imtiaz Ali of The Times of India in 2010 called it the "most proto-typical, high involvement, expensive, passionate piece of work that Hindi cinema has ever produced", one that "set the standard for everything that will ever come after it". It continues to be regarded by critics as the Indian equivalent of Gone with the Wind. Filmmaker Subhash Ghai was quoted in 2010 as saying that a film like this could never be repeated: "Mughal-e-Azam is an all-time classic and has been the ultimate love story in Hindi cinema at all levels. So it will always remain alive for generations to come." To commemorate the film's anniversary, the actor and producer Shah Rukh Khan had his company Red Chillies Entertainment produce a documentary video titled Mughal-E-Azam – A Tribute by a son to his father. Hosted by Khan, it includes interviews with Asif's family and Hindi film stars. Artist M. F. Husain created a series of paintings for the video, in which he re-imagined some memorable scenes. Interested in preserving the film for future generations, Khan noted that his father was originally cast in the film but did not complete it. When asked if Mughal-e-Azam should be remade, he retorted: "It is the mother of all films; mothers cannot be remade". No sequels have been made, but Maan Gaye Mughal-e-Azam (2008) paid tribute with its title and by including in its plot part of the original stage play; it received very poor ratings from critics. In October 2016, producer Feroz Abbas Khan premiered a stage play based on the film with a cast of over 70 actors and dancers at Mumbai's NCPA theatre.

Mughal-e-Azam ranks on the lists of top Indian films, including the 2002 British Film Institute poll of Top 10 Indian Films, and Anupama Chopra's 2009 list The Best Bollywood Films. It is also included in IBN Live's 2013 list of the "100 greatest Indian films of all time". It was named the greatest Bollywood film of all time by a poll celebrating 100 years of Indian cinema by British Asian weekly newspaper Eastern Eye in July 2013. It belongs to a small collection of films including Kismet (1943), Mother India (1957), Sholay (1975), Hum Aapke Hain Koun..! (1994) and Gadar: Ek Prem Katha (2001), that are watched repeatedly throughout India and are viewed as definitive Hindi films of cultural significance. Books and documentaries made about the film include Shakil Warsi's Mughal-E-Azam – An Epic of Eternal Love, published by Rupa in 2009.

== See also ==
- List of historical drama films set in Asia
- 100 Crore Club
- 1000 Crore Club
- List of highest-grossing films in India
- 1960 in film
- Hindi films of 1960

== Bibliography ==
- Akbar, Khatija (2011) [1997]. 'I Want to Live': The Story of Madhubala. Hay House. ISBN 978-93-80480-81-7.
- Arif, Salim (2003). "Costumes: The Essence and Fabric". In Gulzar; Nihalani, Govind; Chatterjee, Saibal (eds.). Encyclopaedia of Hindi Cinema. Encyclopædia Britannica, Popular Prakashan. ISBN 978-81-7991-066-5. Archived from the original on 5 April 2019.
- Bose, Mihir (2006). Bollywood: A History. Tempus. ISBN 978-0-7524-2835-2.
- Chakravarty, Sumita S. (1993). National Identity in Indian Popular Cinema, 1947–1987. University of Texas Press. ISBN 978-0-292-78985-2. Archived from the original on 4 May 2016.
- Dwyer, Rachel (7 June 2006). Filming the Gods: Religion and Indian Cinema. Routledge. ISBN 978-1-134-38070-1. Archived from the original on 11 May 2016.
- Ganti, Tejaswini (2004). Bollywood: a Guidebook to Popular Hindi Cinema. Taylor & Francis. ISBN 978-0-415-28854-5. Archived from the original on 20 March 2017.
- Gokulsing, K. Moti; Dissanayake, Wimal (17 April 2013). Routledge Handbook of Indian Cinemas. Routledge. ISBN 978-0-415-67774-5. Archived from the original on 11 May 2016.
- Jain, Madhu (17 April 2009). Kapoors: The First Family of Indian Cinema. Penguin Books Limited. ISBN 978-81-8475-813-9. Archived from the original on 24 June 2016.
- Kavoori, Anandam P.; Punathambekar, Aswin (2008). Global Bollywood. NYU Press. ISBN 978-0-8147-2944-1. Archived from the original on 29 May 2016.
- Keswani, Rajkumar (February 2020). Dastan-e-Mughal-e-Azam (in Hindi). Bhopal, India: Manjul Publishing House. ISBN 9789389647389.
- Khubchandani, Lata (2003). "Song and Dance: Song Picturization and Choreography". In Gulzar; Nihalani, Govind; Chatterjee, Saibal (eds.). Encyclopaedia of Hindi Cinema. Encyclopædia Britannica, Popular Prakashan. ISBN 978-81-7991-066-5. Archived from the original on 5 April 2019.
- Mahbubani, Kishore (2009). The New Asian Hemisphere: The Irresistible Shift of Global Power to the East. PublicAffairs. ISBN 978-1-58648-628-0. Archived from the original on 27 April 2016.
- Mishra, Vijay (2002). Bollywood Cinema: Temples of Desire. Routledge. ISBN 978-0-415-93015-4. Archived from the original on 17 June 2016.
- Morcom, Anna (2007). Hindi Film Songs and the Cinema. Ashgate Publishing, Ltd. ISBN 978-0-7546-5198-7. Archived from the original on 17 May 2016.
- Nandy, Ashis (1998). The Secret Politics of Our Desires: Innocence, Culpability and Indian Popular Cinema. Palgrave Macmillan. ISBN 978-1-85649-516-5. Archived from the original on 2 May 2016.
- Pauwels, Heidi R.M. (2007). Indian Literature and Popular Cinema: Recasting Classics. Routledge: Taylor & Francis Group. ISBN 978-0-203-93329-9. Archived from the original on 11 June 2016.
- Pauwels, Heidi R.M. (2008). The Goddess as Role Model: Sita and Radha in Scripture and on Screen. Oxford University Press. ISBN 978-0-19-970857-4. Archived from the original on 27 April 2016.
- Rajadhyaksha, Ashish; Willemen, Paul (1998) [1994]. Encyclopaedia of Indian Cinema. British Film Institute and Oxford University Press. ISBN 0-19-563579-5.
- Rishi, Tilak (May 2012). Bless You Bollywood!: A Tribute to Hindi Cinema on Completing 100 Years. Trafford Publishing. ISBN 978-1-4669-3963-9. Archived from the original on 24 June 2016.
- Roy, Sharmishta (2003). "Art Direction: Sets, Reality, and Grandeur". In Gulzar; Nihalani, Govind; Chatterjee, Saibal (eds.). Encyclopaedia of Hindi Cinema. Encyclopædia Britannica, Popular Prakashan. ISBN 978-81-7991-066-5. Archived from the original on 5 April 2019.
- Teo, Stephen (2012). The Asian Cinema Experience: Styles, Spaces, Theory. Routledge. ISBN 978-1-136-29608-6. Archived from the original on 10 May 2016.
- Warsi, Shakil (2009). Mughal-E-Azam. Rupa & Company. ISBN 978-81-291-1321-4.
- Statistical Abstract of the United States: 1961 (PDF). US Bureau of the Census. 1961. Archived (PDF) from the original on 29 October 2013.
