= Bahut Din Huwe =

1954 film by S. S. Vasan

- Poster
- Directed by: S. S. Vasan
- Written by: Dialogues by: Pandit Indra, J. S. Casshyap
- Produced by: S. S. Vasan
- Starring: Madhubala; Rattan Kumar
- Edited by: N.R.Krishnaswami
- Music by: E. Sankara Sastri, B. S. Kalla
- Production company: Gemini Studios
- Release date: 19 March 1954
- Country: India
- Language: Hindi
- Box office: est. ₹0.32 crore (est. ₹40 crore as of 2016)

Bahut Din Huwe (transl. Many days have passed) is a 1954 Indian Hindi-language film directed by S. S. Vasan, produced by Gemini Studios and starring Madhubala. It is a remake of the Telugu film Bala Nagamma (1942).

Bahut Din Huwe received lukewarm reviews from critics upon its release in March 1954. The film was not a commercial success, although it went on to celebrate a silver jubilee (theatrical run of 25 weeks) in Poona.

== Plot ==
Madhubala plays the role of Princess Chandrakanta, who is born due to the blessings of Nagraj. Due to Nagraj's curse, the Queen dies as soon as the princess stops breastfeeding. The second Queen grows jealous of the princess and orders her men to kill her. However, the men assigned to kill her leave her in the forest, where she gets adopted by a priest and his wife, who ill-treats her. When she grows up, she is spotted by Prince Anand Kumar, who immediately falls in love with her. She marries him and gives birth to a son. An evil and lustful magician king, Bhadra Chamund, decides to marry Chandrakanta when he discovers that she is the most beautiful woman in the world. Disguising himself as a saint, he goes to her palace to beg for alms and kidnaps her. When Anand finds out, he marches to Bhadra Chamund's kingdom with his army to defeat him, but Anand and his army are turned to stone by his magic.

Years later, Chandrakanta and Vijaykumar's son, Prince Vijay Kumar (Rattan Kumar), who is brought up by the palace servants, learns the truth about his parents and resolves to free them. He reaches Bhadra Chamund's kingdom with his servant Tarang Sen (Agha) and impresses him by presenting a garland. Fooling the guards, he enters the jail and finally meets his mother Chandrakanta. Chandrakanta tells him that across seven mountains and a dark cave lies a five-coloured parrot, in which Bhadra Chamund has stored his soul. He sets upon this dangerous journey to the faraway land Mayanagari, faces several obstacles like women who try to hypnotise him by playing the veena, and encounters magical illusions like a garden containing talking animals.

== Cast ==
- Madhubala as Chandrakanta
- Rattan Kumar as Vijayakumar
- Swaraj as Prince Anand Kumar
- Agha as Tarang Sen
- Kailash as Bhadra Chamund
- Savitri as Mohini
- Pushpavalli as Bhulakshmi Devi
- Gulab as Flower Woman
- Kanhaiyalal as Pujari
- Lalita Pawar as Ekadasi
- Suryaprabha as Young Queen
- Neela as Mala
- Baby Saraswati as Young Chandra
- M. K. Radha as The King
- Roy Chowdhury as Nagaraj
- Indira Acharya as Maid
- Thousands of Gemini Boys and Girls

== Production ==
Bahut Din Huwe is a remake of the Telugu film Bala Nagamma (1942), and marked Savitri's debut in Hindi cinema. Shooting took place at Madras.

== Songs ==
1. "Saiyaan Tere Prem Ki Diwaani Ban Aai Hun" – Lata Mangeshkar
2. "Ammaa Ammaa Tu Kahaan Gai Amma" – Lata Mangeshkar
3. "Gajaananam, He Ganesh Gananaayak" – Lata Mangeshkar
4. "Vinaa Meri Aashaa Bhari, Kyun Chameli Khilakhilaati Hai Bata" – Lata Mangeshkar
5. "Mai Hu Rup Ki Rani" – Lata Mangeshkar
6. "Chanda Chamke Nil Gagan Mrunal" – Lata Mangeshkar

== Release ==
The film premiered in Delhi on 3 September 1954. It was subsequently released in Bombay on 26 November 1954.

== Reception ==
Reviews published in The Times of India described the film as a "grand fare" and a "magnificent picture".

The film was not a commercial success, although it went on to celebrate a silver jubilee in Poona.
