= Sharabi (1964 film) =

1964 film by Raj Rishi

- Poster
- Directed by: Raj Rishi
- Screenplay by: Raj Rishi
- Story by: Raj Rishi
- Starring: Madhubala; Dev Anand
- Cinematography: M. W. Mukadam
- Edited by: Pran Mehra
- Music by: Madan Mohan; Rajinder Krishan (lyrics)
- Release date: 24 January 1964
- Running time: 143 minutes
- Country: India
- Language: Hindi
- Box office: est. ₹4 million

Sharabi (transl. Drunkard) is a 1964 Hindi-language drama film directed by Raj Rishi and starring Madhubala and Dev Anand. The film tells the story of a man and his obsession with alcohol. Sharabi was a commercial success and one of the top-grossing films of 1964. For Madhubala, although the film released five years before her death, it was her final release in her lifetime.

== Plot ==
Kamala and Keshav are in love and want to marry, but his excessive drinking habit and carelessness has caused his father's demise and makes Kamala's father to postpone their marriage. On the day of his father's death, Keshav vows not to drink again. All are happy. After seeing a change in Keshav, Kamala's father fixed their marriage. But three days before their marriage, Keshav have a stomach ache. He goes to a medicine shop. The shopkeeper doesn't have any empty bottle, but he finds an empty rum bottle in which he gives him the medicine. On the way to home, he meets Kamla. When they were busy in love, two drunkard steals his bottle but he gets his bottle back. But the bottles gets somehow changed.

One day, when he again had stomach ache, he opens that bottle; he knows that its not medicine but a drink. He can't resist and drinks it. When everyone becomes aware, his marriage is cancelled again. They go to another city and Keshav takes to excessive drinking. Kamla's father dies and she has no option than to go to Keshav's house. But Keshav doesn't welcome her and continues drinking. Once in drinking state, he puts fire in a coal mine where his mother also works. His mother loses her both feet and he is sent to jail. Kamla waits for him to return.

== Cast ==
- Madhubala as Kamala
- Dev Anand as Keshav
- Lalita Pawar as Keshav's mother
- Daisy Irani as Munni
- Badri Prasad as Laxmi Das

== Production ==
Most of the shooting of Sharabi was completed in 1958, and it was slated to release in late 1958. Madhubala fell sick during the filming and thus the shooting came to a halt. Following temporary recovery, she went to London along with her husband Kishore Kumar for her treatment, the film still incomplete. She finished her work in Sharabi in early 1964.

== Soundtrack ==
The soundtrack of Sharabi was composed by Madan Mohan and lyrics were penned by Rajendra Krishan.

Sharabi

Soundtrack album by Madan Mohan
- Released: 1964
- Genre: Feature film soundtrack
- Length: 28:00
- Language: Hindi
- Label: Saregama
- Producer: Madan Mohan

Madan Mohan chronology
| Pooja Ke Phool (1964) | Sharabi (1964) | Suhagan (1964) |

Songs
| No. | Title | Singer(s) | Length |
|---|---|---|---|
| 1. | "Sawan Ke Mahine Mein, Pt. 1" | Mohammed Rafi | 3:28 |
| 2. | "Kabhi Na Kabhi Kahin Na Kahin" | Mohammed Rafi | 4:01 |
| 3. | "Mujhe Le Chalo Aaj Phir" | Mohammed Rafi | 6:18 |
| 4. | "Sawan Ke Mahine Mein, Pt. 2" | Mohammed Rafi | 4:32 |
| 5. | "Jao Ji Jao" | Mohammed Rafi and Asha Bhosle | 3:18 |
| 6. | "Tum Ho Haseen Kahan Ke" | Mohammed Rafi and Asha Bhosle | 3:16 |
| 7. | "Do Do Haath Do Do Paon" | Mohammed Rafi | 3:08 |
| Total length: | | | 28:00 |

== Reception ==
=== Critical reception ===
A Times of India review, published on 26 January 1964, described the film as "a dull affair".

=== Box office ===
As per Box office India, Sharabi was the eighteenth highest-grossing film of 1964, earning ₹4 million with profits of ₹2.4 million.
