= List of Hindi films of 1957 =

A list of films produced by the Bollywood film industry based in Mumbai in 1957:

== Highest-grossing films ==
The ten highest-grossing films at the Indian box office in 1957:

Rank	Title	Gross collection	Notes
1	Mother India	₹8 crore	The film became a blockbuster at the box office, eventually becoming the highest-grossing film of the decade.
2	Naya Daur	₹5.40 crore	A drama where the horse-cart drivers fight against the introduction of buses to the town threatening their livelihoods.
3	Pyaasa	₹2.90 crore	A romantic drama about a poet who rebels against the norms of society and grows cynical of the world.
4	Do Aankhen Barah Haath	₹2.45 crore	
5	Tumsa Nahin Dekha	₹1.95 crore	
6	Paying Guest	₹1.55 crore	
7	Aasha	₹1.45 crore	
8	Bhabhi	₹1.15 crore	
9	Sharada	₹95 lakh	
10	Musafir	₹85 lakh	

== A–C ==
Title	Director	Cast	Genre	Notes
Aadhi Roti	Chandrakant	Prem Adib, Bhagwan, Sulochana, Daisy Irani, Bimla Kumari, Amirbai Karnataki, Manorama, Ratnamala, Rajan Haksar	Social	Music: Avinash Vyas Lyrics: Bharat Vyas
Aasha	M. V. Raman	Kishore Kumar, Vyjayanthimala, Pran, Minu Mumtaz, Lalita Pawar, Om Prakash, Asha Parekh, Dhumal, Sunder	Musical Thriller Drama	Music: C. Ramchandra Lyrics: Rajendra Krishan
Aadmi	Navnit Rai	Nasir Khan, Begum Para, Yakub, Uma Dutt, Nirmal Kumar, Kamal Mehra, Kammo	Romance Drama	Loosely based on Cyrano de Bergerac. Music: Ramnath Lyrics: Sartaj Rahmani
Ab Dilli Dur Nahin	Amar Kumar	Motilal, Master Romi, Sulochana, Yakub, Anwar Hussain, Amjad Khan, Iftekhar, Hari Shivdasani, Nana Palsikar	Social Drama	Produced by Raj Kapoor. Music: Dattaram Lyrics: Shailendra, Hasrat Jaipuri
Abhimaan	Mahesh Kaul	Shekhar, Ameeta, Chand Usmani, Mehmood, Yakub, Nazir Hussain, Leela Mishra, Badri Prasad, Sheela Vaz, Ram Avtar, Indira Bansal	Social Family Drama	Music: Anil Biswas Lyrics: Indeevar, Pandit Madhur, Saraswati Kumar Deepak
Agra Road	Ravindra Dave	Vijay Anand, Shakila, Nanda, Bhagwan, Amarnath, Dhumal,	Romance, Crime	Music: Roshan Lyrics: Bharat Vyas, Prem Dhawan
Alladdin Leila	Lekhraj Bhakri	Mahipal, Shakila, Krishna Kumari, Lalita Pawar, Niranjan Sharma, Tun Tun, Nazir Kashmiri, Kammo, Kanchanmala	Fantasy	Music: A. R. Qureshi Lyrics: Asad Bhopali
Anjali	Chetan Anand	Nimmi, Chetan Anand, Sheila Ramani, Sitara Devi, Kumkum, Krishan Dhawan, Madan Puri	Social Drama	Music: Jaidev Lyrics: Nyay Sharma
Apradhi Kaun?	Asit Sen	Abhi Bhattacharya, Mala Sinha, Suresh, Tarun Bose, Murad, Jagirdar, Dhumal, Kammo, Lillian		Produced by Bimal Roy. Music: Salil Chowdhary Lyrics: Majrooh Sultanpuri
Baarish	Shankar Mukherjee	Dev Anand, Nutan, Mehmood, Kumkum, Madan Puri, Lalita Pawar, Gope, Helen, Nana Palsikar	Romance Social	Music: C. Ramachandra Lyrics: Rajendra Krishan
Bada Bhai	K. Amarnath	Ajit, Kamini Kaushal, Ameeta, Kumkum, Tun Tun, Nazir Hussain, Jayant, Anant Kumar	Family	Music:Nashad Lyrics: Ehsan Rizvi, Raja Mehdi Ali Khan
Bade Sarkar	Kishore Sahu	Kishore Sahu, Kamini Kaushal, K. N. Singh, Sajjan, Durga Khote, Raj Kumar, Gope, Agha, Kanu Roy, Vijaylaxmi, Ram Avtar	Social	Music: O. P. Nayyar Lyrics: Sahir Ludhianvi
Bandi	Satyen Bose	Ashok Kumar, Bina Rai, Shyama, Kishore Kumar, Nanda, Leela Mishra, Anoop Kumar, Kanhaiyalal, Kammo	Family Drama	Music: Hemant Kumar Lyrics: Rajendra Krishan, Ravi, Prem Dhawan
Bansari Bala	Nanubhai Vakil	Daljeet, Kumkum, Tiwari, Maruti	Fantasy	Music: Kamal Mitra
Begunah	Narindra Suri	Kishore Kumar, Shakila, Radhakrishan, Mubarak, Helen, Tun Tun, Krishnakant, Samson, Raja Nene, Sheela Vaz, Pravin Paul, Moni Chatterjee	Thriller Comedy	Music: Shankar Jaikishan Lyrics: Shailendra, Hasrat Jaipuri
Bhabhi	R. Krishnan, S. Panju	Balraj Sahni, Nanda, Shyama, Jagdeep, Durga Khote, Om Prakash, Agha, Bhagwan, Bipin Gupta, Manorama	Family Drama	Music: Chitragupta Lyrics: Rajendra Krishan
Bhakta Dhruva	Gunjal	Trilok Kapoor, Shahu Modak, Sulochana, Jeevan, Shammi, Sunder, Kanchanmala, Anant Kumar, Amar	Mythological	Music: Basant Prakash Lyrics: Pandit Madhur
Captain Kishore	JBH Wadia	Suresh, Shashikala, Sheikh Mukhtar, Vijaya Chaudhary, Anwar Hussain, Naina, Tun Tun, Roopmala	Action	Music: Chitragupta Lyrics: Raja Mehdi Ali Khan, Khumar Barabankvi, Tanvir Naqvi
Champakali	Nandlal Jaswantlal	Bharat Bhushan, Suchitra Sen, Pran, Shubha Khote, Mubarak, Ram Avtar	Romance	Music: Hemant Kumar Lyrics: Rajendra Krishan
Chandi Puja	Raman B. Desai	Nirupa Roy, Manhar Desai, Shanta Apte, Prem Adib, Sudhir, Moni Chatterjee, Sapru	Devotional	Music: Ajit Merchant Lyrics: Kavi Pradeep
Chenghiz Khan	Kedar Kapoor	Premnath, Bina Rai, Sheikh Mukhtar, Leela Mishra, Johnny Walker, Tiwari, Jeevan, Helen, Sunder, Jagdish Kanwal	Action	Music: Hansraj Behl Lyrics: Qamar Jalalabadi, Verma Malik
Chhote Babu	Harsukh Bhatt	Shekhar, Nimmi, Leela Mishra, Abhi Bhattacharya, Helen, Agha, Kanhaiyalal	Social Family	Music: Madan Mohan Lyrics: Indeevar, Pyare Lal Santoshi
Coffee House	Hari Walia	Shammi Kapoor, Geeta Bali, Chanchal, Bhagwan, Jeevan, Helen, Vijayalaxmi	Social Romance	Music: Roshan Lyrics: Prem Dhawan, Hasrat Jaipuri

== D–L ==
Title	Director	Cast	Genre	Notes
Dekh Kabira Roya	Amiya Chakrabarty	Anita Guha, Ameeta, Shubha Khote, Anoop Kumar, Daljeet, Jawahar Kaul, Sunder	Comedy	Music: Madan Mohan Lyrics: Rajendra Krishan
Diler Daku	Noshir Engineer	Nadia, John Cawas, Vijaya Choudhary, Dalpat, Samar Roy, Heera Sawant, Habib	Action Costume	Music: Shafi M. Nagri Lyrics: Pandit Chand
Do Aankhen Barah Haath	V. Shantaram	Sandhya, Ulhas, B. M. Vyas, Paul Sharma, S. K. Singh, Baburao Pendharkar, Keshavrao Date	Social	Entered into the 8th Berlin International Film Festival where it won the Silver Bear Extraordinary Prize of the Jury. It won the National Award for Best Feature Film of 1957 National Film Awards Music: Vasant Desai Lyrics: Bharat Vyas
Do Roti	Ismail Memon	Balraj Sahni, Nirupa Roy, Nazir Hussain, Mehmood, Nalini Chonkar, Minu Mumtaz, Kanhaiyalal, Leela Mishra, Nana Palsikar	Social Drama	Music: Roshan Lyrics: Khumar Barabankvi
Duniya Rang Rangili	M. Sadiq	Rajendra Kumar, Shyama, Johnny Walker, Chand Usmani, Amar, Jeevan, Parshuram, Helen, S. N. Bannerjee, Kanchanmala, Amir Bano	Comedy Thriller	Music: O. P. Nayyar Lyrics: Jan Nissar Akhtar
Dushman	Raj Rishi	Dev Anand, Usha Kiran, Kumkum, Prabhu Dayal, Radhakrishan, Master Romi, Minu Mumtaz, Chand Burq, Jagdish Kanwal	Social Action	Music: Husnlal Bhagatram Lyrics: Prem Dhawan, Pyarelal Santoshi
Ek Gaon Ki Kahani	Dulal Guha	Mala Sinha, Talat Mahmood, Abhi Bhattacharya, I. S. Johar, Nirupa Roy, Lalita Pawar, Bipin Gupta, Dulari	Social Family	Music: Salil Choudhury Lyrics: Shailendra
Ek Jhalak	Kalidas	Pradeep Kumar, Vyjayanthimala, Rajendra Kumar, Anita Guha, Pran, Lalita Pawar, Om Prakash, Bipin Gupta, Tun Tun, Mubarak	Social	Produced by Pradeep Kumar. Music: Hemant Kumar Lyrics: S. H. Bihari
Ek Saal	Devendra Goel	Ashok Kumar, Madhubala, Johnny Walker, Kuldip Kaur, Minu Mumtaz, Madan Puri, Mehmood, Nazir Kashmiri, Pratima Devi	Social Crime	Music: Ravi Lyrics: Prem Dhawan
Fashion	Lekhraj Bhakri	Pradeep Kumar, Mala Sinha, Manoj Kumar, Chandrashekhar, Jabeen, Jagdish Sethi, Amir Bano, Kammo, Leela Mishra	Social	Music: Hemant Kumar Lyrics: Bharat Vyas
Garma Garam	Pyare Lal Santoshi	Bhagwan, Nadira, Agha, Krishna Kumari, Om Prakash, B. M. Vyas, Gope, Maruti,	Action	Music: Vinod Lyrics: Pyare Lal Santoshi, D. N. Madhok
Gateway of India	Om Prakash	Madhubala, Bharat Bhushan, Pradeep Kumar, Anita Guha, Johnny Walker, Bhagwan, Tony Walker, Raj Mehra	Thriller Suspense	Music: Madan Mohan Lyrics: Rajendra Krishan
Hazaar Pariyan	Balwant Bhatt	Kamal Kapoor, Jaymala, Ratnamala, B. M. Vyas, Shukla, Mirza Musharaf	Fantasy	Music: Lachhiram Tamar, K. Narayana Rao
Hill Station	Shakti Samanta	Pradeep Kumar, Bina Rai, Shyama, K. N. Singh, Pratima Devi, Maruti, Nazir Kashmiri, Sheela Vaz	Social Romance	Music: Hemant Kumar Lyrics: S. H. Bihari
Hum Panchhi Ek Daal Ke	P. L. Santoshi	Jagdeep, Master Romi, Daisy Irani, Mohan Choti, Satish Vyas, Achala Sachdev, Amirbai Karnataki, David, Murad, Niranjan Sharma	Children Drama	Music: N. Dutta Lyrics: Pyare Lal Santoshi
Jaani Dushman	Shivraj	Shivraj, Kamlesh Kumari, Anees, Aruna, Suryakant, Datta Chavan, Baburao Pendharkar	Social Action	Music: N. A. Dagar Lyrics: C. M. Hunar
Jahazi Lutera	Akkoo	Jairaj Shashikala, Anwar Hussain, Maruti, Heera Sawant, Rooplaxmi, Habib, Maqbul, Ram Kumar	Action	Music: Bulo C. Rani Lyrics: Sartaj Rahmani, Saba Afghani
Jai Ambe	Shanti Kumar	Sulochana, Manhar Desai, Jeevan, Sapru, Niranjan Sharma, Kanchanmala, Raj Kumar, Heera Sawant	Devotional	Music: Shivram Lyrics: Bharat Vyas
Jalti Nishani	Tara Harish	Geeta Bali, Kamal Kapoor, Kuldip Kaur, Ulhas, Chaman Puri, Sunder, Nazir Kashmiri,		Music: Anil Biswas Lyrics: Qamar Jalalabadi
Janam Janam Ke Phere a.k.a. Sati Anapurna	Manmohan Desai	Nirupa Roy, Mahipal, Manhar Desai, Krishna Kumari B. M. Vyas, S. N. Tripathi, Amirbai Karnataki, Satish Vyas	Family Drama Devotional	Music: S. N. Tripathi Lyrics: Bharat Vyas
Jannat	Mohan Sinha	Mahipal, Shyama, Krishna Kumari, Sapru, Tiwari, Maruti	Fantasy	Music: Husnlal Bhagatram Lyrics: Kaifi Azmi
Jeevan Sathi	R. S. Tara	Ashok Kumar, Usha Kiran, Anoop Kumar, Jabeen, Daisy Irani, Murad, Leela Mishra, Amarnath, Iftekhar, Dhumal	Family Drama	Music: Bulo C. Rani Lyrics: Indeevar, Kumud Tripathi, D. N. Madhok
Johnny Walker	Ved Madan	Johnny Walker, Shyama, Sulochana (Ruby Myers), Daljeet, Raj Mehra, Haroon, Sheela Vaz, W. M. Khan, Amar	Comedy	Music: O. P. Nayyar Lyrics: Hasrat Jaipuri
Kathputli	Amiya Chakravarty	Vyjayanthimala, Balraj Sahni, Jawahar Kaul, Poonam, Sheela Kashmiri, Kamala Laxman, C. S. Dubey	Drama	Music: Shankar Jaikishan Lyrics: Shailendra, Hasrat Jaipuri
Khuda Ka Banda	Chaturbhuj Doshi	Chandrashekhar, Krishna Kumari, Tiwari, Maruti, Gope, Ishwarlal, Amirbai Karnataki, Roopmala, Ratnamala, Jagdish Kanwal, Moni Chatterjee	Action Costume	Music: S. N. Tripathi Lyrics: Shewan Rizvi
Kitna Badal Gaya Insaan	I. S. Johar	Nalini Jaywant, Ajit, I S Johar, Kamaljeet, Harbans Lal	Social	Music: Hemant Kumar Lyrics: S. H. Bihari
Krishna Sudama	Shanti Kumar	Balraj Sahni, Nirupa Roy, Prem Adib, Raj Kumar, Umakant, Indira Bansal,	Religious	Music: Husnlal Bhagatram Lyrics: Qamar Jalalabadi, Pandit Radheshyam, Ramesh Gupta
Lal Batti	Balraj Sahni	Balraj Sahni, Mala Sinha, Shashikala, Brahm Bhardwaj, Sulochana (Ruby Myers), Jawahar Kaul	Social	Music:Salil Chowdhury Lyrics: Majrooh Sultanpuri
Laxmi	G. P. Pawar	Chandrashekhar, Kamal Kapoor, Nanda, Tiwari, Roopmala, Moni Chatterjee, Parshuram, Ratnamala, Ram Avtar	Social	Music: Avinash Vyas Lyrics: Qamar Jalalabadi
Laxmi Pooja	Jayant Desai	Nirupa Roy, Shahu Modak, Anant Kumar, Jeevan, Niranjan Sharma, Minu Mumtaz, Praveen Paul	Devotional	Music: Chitragupta Lyrics: Bharat Vyas

== M–O ==
Title	Director	Cast	Genre	Notes
Maharani	A. Karim	Shammi Kapoor, Shyama, Kuldip Kaur, Ulhas, Maruti, Anwar Hussain, Tun Tun, Jankidas	Costume	Music: Basant Prakash Lyrics: Hasrat Jaipuri, Wali Sahab
Mai Baap	M. Sadiq	Balraj Sahni, Shyama, Nazir Hussain, Johnny Walker, Minu Mumtaz, Raj Mehra	Family Social	Music: O. P. Nayyar Lyrics: Qamar Jalalabadi, Anjaan, Jan Nisar Akhtar
Maya Nagri	A. M. Khan	Mahipal, Shakila, Krishna Kumari, N. A. Ansari, Murad, Kanchanmala, Amarnath, Jagdish Kanwal	Fantasy	Music: B. N. Bali Lyrics: Bekas Muradabadi, Dukhi Amritsari, Anjaan
Mera Salaam	Harbans	Bharat Bhushan, Bina Rai, Nishi, K. N. Singh, Durga Khote, Veena, Gope	Social	Music: Hafeez Khan Lyrics: Shewan Rizvi
Mirza Sahiban	Ravi Kapoor	Shammi Kapoor, Shyama, Madan Puri, Tun Tun, Mukri	Legend Romance	Music: Sardul Kawatra Lyrics: Verma Malik, Prem Dhawan
Miss Bombay	V. Vakil	Ajit, Nalini Jaywant, Bhagwan, Nishi, Rehman, Vijayalaxmi, Shammi, Daljeet	Action Social	Music: Hansraj Behl Lyrics: Qamar Jalalabadi, Asad Bhopali, Prem Dhawan
Miss India	I. S. Johar	Nargis Dutt, Pradeep Kumar, Nishi, Pran, I. S. Johar, Minu Mumtaz, Shammi	Social	Music: S. D. Burman Lyrics: Rajendra Krishan
Miss Mary	L.V. Prasad	Meena Kumari, Gemini Ganesan, Kishore Kumar, Jamuna, Om Prakash, Achala Sachdev, Maruti, Jagdish Sethi, Shivraj	Comedy Family	Music: Hemant Kumar Lyrics: Rajendra Krishan
Mohini	Raman Desai	Nirupa Roy, Shahu Modak, Shakila, Krishna Kumari, Madan Puri, Jagdish Kanwal, Rooplaxmi	Costume Fantasy	Music: Datta Naik Lyrics: Hasrat Jaipuri, Raja Mehdi Ali Khan
Mother India	Mehboob Khan	Nargis, Sunil Dutt, Rajendra Kumar, Raaj Kumar, Kanhaiyalal, Kumkum, Chanchal, Sajid Khan	Social Drama	First Indian film to be nominated at Oscars in 1957 in the Best Foreign Language Film category. Certificate of Merit for the second best feature film at the Indian National Film Awards. Music: Naushad Lyrics: Shakeel Badayuni
Mr. X	Nanabhai Bhatt	Ashok Kumar, Nalini Jaywant, Pran, Johnny Walker, Nishi, Sajjan, Murad, Helen, Amirbai Karnataki, Sheela Vaz	Action Thriller Fantasy	Music: Datta Naik Lyrics: Hasrat Jaipuri, Majrooh Sultanpuri, Tanveer Naqvi, Bharat Vyas
Mumtaz Mahal	Ram Daryani	Jairaj, Veena, Sheila Ramani, Agha, G. M. Durrani, Nazir Kashmiri, Heera Sawant	Historical Drama	Music: Vinod Lyrics: Hasrat Jaipuri, Kaif Irfani, Pandit Priyadarshi
Musafir	Hrishikesh Mukherjee	Dilip Kumar, Usha Kiran, Daisy Irani, Suchitra Sen, Shekhar, Kishore Kumar, Nirupa Roy, Nazir Hussain David, Bipin Gupta, Mohan Choti, Slochana Sen, Naaz	Social	Certificate of Merit for the third best feature film at the Indian National Film Awards Music: Salil Chowdhary Lyrics: Shailendra
Naag Lok	Babubhai Mistri	Nirupa Roy, Shahu Modak, Krishna Kumari, Ajit, Tiwari, Kanta Kumari, Dalpat	Fantasy	Music: Ramlal Heerapanna Lyrics: Bharat Vyas, Saraswati Kumar Deepak, Pyarelal Santoshi
Naag Mani	Raman Desai	Nirupa Roy, Manhar Desai, Trilok Kapoor, Yashodra Katju, Sunder, Helen, S. N. Tripathi, Rajan Haksar, Heera Sawant	Fantasy	Music: Avinash Vyas Lyrics: Kavi Pradeep
Naag Padmini	Lekhraj Bhakri	Mahipal, Shakila, Krishna Kumari, Daljeet, Kammo, Tiwari, Kanchanmala, Niranjan Sharma	Fantasy	Music: Sanmukh Babu Lyrics: Prem Dhawan
Narsi Bhagat	Devendra Goel	Nirupa Roy, Shahu Modak, Lalita Pawar, Radha Krishan, Niranjan Sharma, Kanchanmala, Minu Mumtaz	Devotional	Music: Ravi Lyrics: Gopal Singh Nepali
Nau Do Gyarah	Vijay Anand	Dev Anand, Kalpana Kartik, Jeevan, Lalita Pawar, Shashikala, Madan Puri, Rashid Khan, Helen, Jagdish Raj, Nazir Kashmiri, Tun Tun	Romance, Thriller	Music: S. D. Burman Lyrics: Majrooh Sultanpuri
Nausherwan-E-Adil	Sohrab Modi	Raaj Kumar, Mala Sinha, Sohrab Modi, Naseem Bano, Murad, Agha, Shammi	Drama Action Adventure	Music: C. Ramchandra Lyrics: Parvez Shamsi
Naya Daur	B. R. Chopra	Dilip Kumar, Vyjayanthimala, Ajit, J. Walker, Jeevan, Nazir Hussain, Kumkum, Manmohan Krishna, Minu Mumtaz	Social Drama	Music: O. P. Nayyar Lyrics: Sahir Ludhianvi
Naya Zamana	Lekhraj Bhakri	Pradeep Kumar, Mala Sinha, Veena, Badri Prasad, Leela Mishra, Gope, Kammo	Social	Music: Kanu Ghosh Lyrics: Bharat Vyas, Prem Dhawan
Neelmani	Kundan Kumar	Nalini Jaywant, Prem Adib, Raaj Kumar, Lalita Pawar, Sulochana Chatterjee, Kuldip Kaur, S N Tripathi, Mohan Choti	Devotional	Lyrics: Chitragupta Lyrics: Bharat Vyas, Gopal Singh Nepali
Neelofar	P. N. Arora	Chitra, Suresh, Nishi, Sunder, W. M. Khan, Amar, Helen	Costume Fantasy	Music: Basant Prakash, Avinash Vyas Lyrics: Hasrat Jaipuri

== P–Z ==
Title	Director	Cast	Genre	Notes
Paisa	Prithviraj Kapoor	Prithviraj Kapoor, Uzra Mumtaz, Soodesh Kumar, Ravindra Kapoor, Kuldip Kaur, Zohra Sehgal, Kanhaiyalal	Social	Music: Ram Ganguly Lyrics: Lalchand Bismil, Nazir Akbarabadi, Surdas
Pardesi	Khwaja Ahmad Abbas	Oleg Strizhenov, Nargis, Prithviraj Kapoor, Balraj Sahni, Bharat Bhushan, Padmini, P. Jairaj, Manmohan Krishna, David	Travel Romance	Indo-Soviet production. Nominated for Golden Palm at the 1958 Cannes Film Festival. M. R. Achrekar won the Filmfare Best Art Direction Award. Music: Anil Biswas Lyrics: Prem Dhawan, Ali Sardar Jafri
Paristan	Dhirubhai Desai	Shakila, Ranjan, Chandrashekhar, Lalita Pawar, Agha, Jeevankala, Roopmala, Manorama, Jankidas	Fantasy	Music: S. N. Tripathi Lyrics: Raja Mehdi Ali Khan
Patal Pari	S. P. Bakshi	Shakila, P. Jairaj, Kumkum, Tiwari, Yashodara Katju, Khairati, Heera Sawant	Fantasy	Music: S. Mohinder Lyrics: Tanveer Naqvi, Sarshar Sailani
Parvin	Nanubhai Vakil	Rehman, Chitra, Minu Mumtaz, Tun Tun, Kanchanmala, W. M. Khan, Jebunissa, Mehmood	Social	Music: A. R. Qureshi Lyrics: Raja Mehdi Ali Khan
Pawan Putra Hanuman	Babubhai Mistry	Mahipal, Anita Guha, B. M. Vyas, Krishna Kumari, S. N. Tripathi, Soodesh Kumar, Amirbai Karnataki, Ratnamala, Kanchanmala, Helen, Sheela Vaz, Pravin Paul	Religious	Music: Chitragupta Lyrics: Saraswati Kumar Deepak, Gopal Singh Nepali
Payal	Joseph Taliath	Sunil Dutt, Padmini, Ragini, Achala Sachdev, David, Agha, Naaz, Bipin Gupta, Raj Mehra, Pravin Paul	Social	Music: Hemant Kumar Lyrics: Rajendra Krishan
Paying Guest	Subodh Mukherjee	Dev Anand, Nutan, Yakub, Shubha Khote, Dulari, Gajanan Jagirdar, Chaman Puri	Romance Thriller Drama	Music: S. D. Burman Lyrics: Majrooh Sultanpuri
Pyaasa	Guru Dutt	Guru Dutt, Mala Sinha, Waheeda Rehman, Johnny Walker, Rehman, Leela Mishra, Mehmood, Kumkum	Social Drama	Music: S. D. Burman Lyrics: Sahir Ludhianvi
Qaidi	Mohammed Husain	Padmini, Suresh, Ragini, Johnny Walker, Agha, Anwar Hussain, Kumar, Agha Miraz, Randhir, Helen	Action	Music: O. P. Nayyar Lyrics: Jan Nissar Akhtar
Raja Vikram	Dhirubhai Desai	Shahu Modak, Usha Kiran, Nigar Sultana, Bhagwan, Niranjan Sharma, Nemo, Suryakant, Bimla Kumari	Fantasy	Music: B. N. Bali Lyrics: Bharat Vyas
Ram Hanuman Yuddha	S. N. Tripathi	Nirupa Roy, Prem Adib, Manhar Desai, S. N. Tripathi, Durga Khote, Sheela Vaz, Dalpat, Uma Dutt	Devotional	Music: S. N. Tripathi Lyrics: Shailendra, Ramesh Chandra Pandey
Ram Lakshman	Mohan Sinha	Shahu Modak, Krishna Kumari, Sulochana, Anant Kumar, Lalita Pawar, Gope, Nanda (as Baby Nanda), Tiwari, Tun Tun, Gopi Krishna	Religious	Music: Avinash Vyas Lyrics: Bharat Vyas
Rani Rupmati	S. N. Tripathi	Nirupa Roy, Bharat Bhushan, Ajit, Nalini Chonkar, Ulhas, B. M. Vyas, Amarnath, Rajrani	Historical Legend Drama	Music: S. N. Tripathi Lyrics: Bharat Vyas
Samundar	Prem Nath	Prem Nath, Bina Rai, Rajendra Nath, Nishi, Ulhas, Ram Avtar, Hiralal, Tun Tun, Sunder	Action	Music: Madan Mohan Lyrics: Rajendra Krishan
Sant Raghu	Chandrakant	Nirupa Roy, Anant Kumar, Lalita Pawar, Tun Tun, Bipin Gupta, Sheela Vaz, S. N. Tripathi, Raj Kumar, Manorama	Devotional	Music: Avinash Vyas Lyrics: Bharat Vyas
Sharada	L. V. Prasad	Meena Kumari, Raj Kapoor, Shyama, Anita Guha, Raj Mehra, Agha, Mehmood, Manorama	Social Family Drama	Shyama: Filmfare Best Supporting Actress Award, Raj Mehra: Filmfare Best Supporting Actor Award, Shivaji Awdhut: Filmfare Best Editing Award Music: C. Ramchandra Lyrics: Rajendra Krishan
Sheroo	Shakti Samanta	Ashok Kumar, Nalini Jaywant, Kuldip Kaur, Om Prakash, Rashid Khan, Anoop Kumar, Madan Puri, Amar, Leela Mishra, Kammo, Gajan Jagirdar	Social Action	Music: Madan Mohan Lyrics: Kaif Irani
Shesh Naag	Chaturbhuj Doshi	Nirupa Roy, Shahu Modak, Trilok Kapoor, Sulochana, Tiwari, Rajrani	Fantasy	Avinash Vyas Lyrics: Bharat Vyas
Shyam Ki Jogan	S. P. Kalla	Shahu Modak, Sulochana, B. M. Vyas, Jeevankala, Jagdev, Ratnamala, Kammo, Maruti	Devotioal	Music: Narayan Lyrics: S. P. Kalla
Suvarna Sundari	Vedantam Raghavayya	Anjali Devi, B. Saroja Devi, Akkineni Nageswara Rao, Shyama, Radhakrishan, Niranjan Sharma, Agha, Dhumal, Bipin Gupta, Kumkum, Sapru, Kamaljit, Daisy Irani	Fantasy	Music: P. Adinarayana Rao Lyrics: Bharat Vyas
Taj Poshi	Dwarka Khosla	Shyama, Ranjan, Jeevan, Shammi, Kanchanmala, Maruti, Kammo, Pravin Paul	Action Costume	Music: Bipin Babul Lyrics: Pyarelal Santoshi
Talash	Vishram Bedekar	Ashok Kumar, Bina Rai, Yakub, Durga Khote, Ameeta, Raj Mehra, Gajanan Jagirdar, Tiwari, Nazir Kashmiri	Action Drama	Music: C. Ramachandra Lyrics: Rajendra Krishan
Tumsa Nahin Dekha	Nasir Hussain	Shammi Kapoor, Ameeta, Pran, Anjali Devi, Raj Mehra, Kanu Roy, Sheela Vaz, B. M. Vyas, Ram Avtar	Romance Drama	Music: O. P. Nayyar Lyrics: Majrooh Sultanpuri, Sahir Ludhianvi
Ustad	Nanabhai Bhatt	Ashok Kumar, Anjali Devi, Anita Guha, Rehman, Kumkum, K. N. Singh, Bhagwan, N. A. Ansari, Cuckoo	Crime Thriller	Music: O. P. Nayyar Lyrics: Jan Nissar Akhtar
Yahudi Ki Ladki	S. D. Narang	Madhubala, Pradeep Kumar, Krishna Kumari, Smriti Biswas, Gajanan Jagirdar, Amar, Hiralal, Helen, Tun Tun, Sheela Vaz	Drama Costume	Music: Hemant Kumar Lyrics: S. H. Bihari
Zamana	Arvind Sen	Yakub, Ameeta, Kamaljit, Gajanan Jagirdar, Nazir Hussain, Kanu Roy, Ram Avtar, Paro Devi	Social	Music: Anil Biswas, Salil Chowdhury
