= Adaa (1951 film) =

- Directed by: Devendra Goel
- Starring: Shekhar; Rehana; Gope; Madan Puri; Mohana Cabral
- Music by: Madan Mohan
- Release date: 1951
- Country: India
- Language: Hindi

Adaa is a 1951 Indian Hindi-language film directed by Devendra Goel. The film features a soundtrack composed by Madan Mohan. Its cast includes Shekhar, Rehana, Gope, and Madan Puri.

== Plot ==
Two friends Madan (Shekhar) and Mithoomal (Gope) join a theatrical company, where their romance associations quickly spark trouble. Madan falls in love with the actress Meena (Rehana), who is also being pursued by Singh (Madan Puri). Rajni (Mohana Cabral) also loves Madan, creating a quadrangular contest. During a shooting act with the theatrical company, Singh—who is an excellent marksman—throws a public challenge asking anyone to step out and compete with his skill. Madan accepts the challenge, scores over Singh, and wins Meena's necklace as a trophy.

The next day, Madan discovers that Meena, Singh, and the theatrical company have suddenly left the station. Smitten by Meena's beauty, Madan travels to Bombay and discovers that both Meena and Singh have been dismissed from the company. Soon after, Madan meets Rajni, another actress working in a different company, who falls in love with him and invites him to her show. At the show, Madan runs into Meena and Singh, who are also working there, and Meena is very pleased to reconnect with him.

The story progresses through several dramatic situations, ultimately ending with kidnapping and rough play until Madan gets Meena after a fierce shootout.

== Cast ==
- Rehana as Meena
- Shekhar as Madan
- Madan Puri as Singh
- Mohana Cabral as Rajni
- Gope as Mithoomal

== Release and reception ==
The film premiered in Bombay on 22 December 1951. It was subsequently reviewed by The Times of India on 19 January 1952.

Writing for Filmindia, Baburao Patel criticized the screenwriters for prioritizing star appeal over a strong central theme. Considering the film a decline from Goel's debut Aankhen, Patel termed Adaa a "poor entertainer" and a "botch-potch of old situations".
