= List of works by Ismat Chughtai =

Ismat Chughtai is an Indian Urdu-language writer. Best known for such short-stories as Lihaaf (1942) and Chu Mui (1952), she also wrote other works including novels and non-fictional essays. Chughtai's unfinished autobiography Kaghazi Hai Pairahan was published posthumously.

== Short stories ==
- Dheet, a soliloquy
- Kafir, her first short story
- Gainda
- Khidmatgaar
- Lihaaf, 1942

== Short story collections ==
- Kaliyan, 1941
- Choten, 1942
- Ek Baat, 1945
- Chhui Mui, 1952
- Do Haath, 1955
- Badan ki Khushboo, 1979
- Amarbel, 1979
- Thori si Paagal, 1979
- Aadhi Aurat Aadha Khwaab, 1986

== Novels ==
- Ziddi, 1941
- Tehri Lakeer, 1943
- Saudai, 1964
- Ajeeb Aadmi, 1970
- Ek Qatra Khoon, 1975

== Novellas ==
- Masooma, 1961
- Dil ki Duniya, 1966
- Jungli Kabootar, 1970

== Children’s novellas ==
- Teen Anarhi, 1988
- Naqli Rajkuman, 1992

== Plays ==
- Fasadi, 1938
- Shaitan
- Intikhab, 1939
- Dhani Bankein, 1955 (A collection of six radio dramas)
- Dozakh, 1960
- Tanhai ka Zehr, 1977

== Non-fiction ==
- Bachpan, an essay first published in Saqi
- Hum Log, a collection of essays
- Fasadat aur Adab
- Chirag Jal Rahe hain, a personal narrative about Krishan Chander
- Dozakhi, an essay about her brother Azeem Baig Chughtai
- Mera Dost Mera Dushman, a piece about Manto
- Kaghazi hai Pairahan, 1988 (Unfinished autobiography)

== Miscellaneous and collections ==
- Yahan Se Wahan Tak, Society Publishers, 1981 - autobiography
- A Chughtai Collection, Sama Publishing, 2005. ISBN 969-8784-16-0.
- The Heart Breaks Free/The Wild One, South Asia Books, 1993.
- Terhi Lakhir (The Crooked Line), New Delhi, Kali for Women, 1995.
- Quilt and Other Stories, New Delhi, Kali for Women, 1996
- Ismat Chughtai: Shaksiyat aur Fan by Jagdish Chander Wadhawan, 1996, Delhi.
- Lifting the Veil, Penguin, 2001.
- My Friend My Enemy: Essays, Reminiscences, Portraits, New Delhi, Kali for Women, 2001.
- Kaghji Hai Pairahan (Memoir), Rajkamal Prakashan, 2004. ISBN 8171789676.
- Ismat Chughtai; Tr. by M. Asaduddin (2012). A Life in Words: Memoirs. Penguin Books. ISBN 978-0-670-08618-4.
- Muthakhib Afsanay (Selected Stories), Audible, 2015.
