= Sajjan (actor) =

Bollywood and stage actor (1921–2000)

- Born: Sajjan Lal Purohit; 15 January 1921; Jaipur, Jaipur State, British India
- Died: 17 May 2000 (aged 79); Mumbai, Maharashtra, India
- Occupations: Film actor; stage actor; lyricist
- Years active: 1949–1996

Sajjan Lal Purohit (15 January 1921 – 17 May 2000) was an Indian actor and lyricist. He acted in several plays and films from the 1950s to the 1980s. His best known films are Rail Ka Dibba (1953), Chalti Ka Naam Gaadi (1958), Jhumroo (1961), Bees Saal Baad (1962), April Fool (1964) and Johny Mera Naam (1970).

== Early life ==
Sajjan was born on January 15, 1921, in Jodhpur into a Pushkarna Brahmin marwadi family. His full name was Sajjan Lal Purohit, but he was known by his first name in the Indian film industry. Sajjan graduated from Jaswant college in Jodhpur. He had a desire to be a lawyer, not an actor.

== Career ==
In 1941, he arrived in Calcutta and worked as an apprentice in a laboratory of the East India Company. His initial breakthrough in films was as an extra in films such as Masoom (1941) and Chowringhee (1942). Sajjan left Calcutta during the Second World War and reached Mumbai where he worked as an assistant to the famous director Kidar Sharma. At that time, the great showman Raj Kapoor was also an assistant to Sharma. He also worked as assistant to Gajanan Jagirdar and Vakil Sahib and received Rs.35 as salary.

A poet by heart, Sajjan showed his talent when he wrote dialogues for Meena (1944) and lyrics for Door Chalen (1946) and Dhanyavad (1948). He also acted in small roles in Prithvi Theatre. His acting debut film was Dhanyavad. After that, Bombay Theatre's Muqaddar was released in 1950. The heroine was Nalini Jaywant.

By then, Sajjan was well established in films. In the 1950s and 1960s, he acted as the hero or side-hero in films such as Saiyan, Rail Ka Dibba, Bahana, Sheesha, Malkin, Nirmohi, Kasturi, Mehmaan, Lagan, Girl School, Paridhaan, 00 Dulhe, Ghar-Ghar Mein Diioali, Haha Hihi Hoo Hoo, Poonam Jhanjhar and Halla-Gulla. As a hero, his last films were Kabuliwala and Do Chor, and as an artist he last appeared in the 1986 release Shatru with Rajesh Khanna.

An artist of more than 150 films, Sajjan also worked in TV serials. In Vikram Aur Betaal he played Betaal. His other serial was Lena-Dena.

== Filmography ==
Year	Film	Character/Role	Notes
1941	Masoom		Extra
1942	Chowringhee		Extra
1948	Dhanyawad		First film in a proper role
1948	Majboor		
1949	Girls' School	Bipin	
1949	Imtihaan		
1950	Apni Chhaya		
1950	Muqaddar		
1950	Sangram	Lala	
1951	Hum Log	Anand	
1951	Kashmir		
1951	Saiyan	Rajjoo	
1951	Toofan		
1952	Nazaria		
1952	Poonam	Sarju	
1952	Sheesha		
1953	Malkin		
1953	Mehmaan		
1953	Rail Ka Dibba	Mohan	
1954	Halla Gulla		
1954	Kasturi		
1954	Parichay		
1955	Bandish	Madan	
1955	Do Dulhe	Kundan	
1955	Ghar Ghar Mein Diwali	Kailash	
1955	Haha Hihi Hoo Hoo		
1955	Hoor-E-Arab		
1955	Lagan		
1956	Dhake Ki Malmal		
1956	Parivar		
1957	Bade Sarkar	Sumer Singh	
1957	Mr. X		
1957	Paying Guest	Jagat	
1958	Chalti Ka Naam Gaadi	Prakash Chand	
1958	Hathkadi		
1958	Talaq	Mangal	
1959	Chand	Gokul's Father	
1959	Didi	Vinod	
1959	Maharani Padmini		
1959	Toofani Tirandaz		
1960	Bahaana		
1960	Baraat	Shanker Chaudhary	
1960	Sarhad	Madan	
1961	Jhumroo	Banno	
1961	Kabuliwala	Mini's father	
1961	Mera Suhaag		
1962	Bees Saal Baad	Detective Mohan Tripathi	
1963	Yeh Dil Kisko Doon	Man who disguise Anand Lal	
1964	April Fool	Monto	
1964	Daal Me Kala	Natwar Shyam	
1964	Door Gagan Ki Chhaon Men	Deepa	
1964	Ishaara	Ramu	
1965	Aadhi Raat Ke Baad	Ramlal	
1965	Chand Aur Suraj	Kapoor	
1966	Dil Diya Dard Liya	Mansaram	
1966	Lal Bangla	Shankar	
1966	Sawan Ki Ghata	Bansilal	
1966	Tasveer	Ishrat	
1967	Aman		
1967	Anita	Biharilal	
1967	Farz	Damodar	
1967	Hamare Gam Se Mat Khelo		
1967	Ram Aur Shyam	Police Inspector	
1967	Rustom Sohrab		
1968	Aanchal Ke Phool	Shankar	
1968	Aashirwad	Ramdas	
1968	Ankhen	Syed	
1969	Sambandh		
1969	Talash	Dice / Albert	
1970	Ek Nanhi Munni Ladki Thi		
1970	Johny Mera Naam	Bhupendra Singh	
1970	Pagla Kahin Ka	Ramu	Uncredited
1970	Prem Pujari	Suman's maternal uncle	
1970	Sau Saal Beet Gaye	Nanhe	
1971	Do Boond Pani	Hari Singh	
1971	Dushman	Villain's Associate	
1971	Jaane-Anjaane	Hemant's Father	
1971	Ladki Pasand Hai	Chunnilal	
1971	Patanga	Ramu	
1972	Bhaavna		
1972	Buniyaad		
1972	Do Bachche Dus Haath	Lawyer	
1972	Do Chor	Ramsharan	
1972	Ek Bar Mooskura Do		
1972	Ek Khilari Bawan Pattey	Rekha's father	
1972	Kamana		
1972	Parchhaiyan	Sandeep Narayan	
1972	Raja Jani	Khairati	
1972	Yaar Mera	Mahantji	
1973	Agni Rekha	Gopinath Raizada	
1973	Chhalia		
1973	Chhupa Rustam	Rajendra Jain	
1973	Jai Hanuman		
1973	Phagun		
1973	Samjhauta	Jailor	
1973	Suraj Aur Chanda	Mahamantri	
1973	Yauwan	Dr. Shrivastav	
1974	Amir Garib	Nandlal	
1974	Chor Machaye Shor	Amritlal	
1974	Compelled	Dr. Shah	
1974	Jab Andhera Hota Hai	Dara	
1974	Kshitij		
1974	Prem Shastra	Sajjan Bhardwaj	
1974	Resham Ki Dori	Vishal	
1974	Zehreela Insaan	Shyam Lal	
1975	Faraar		
1975	Qaid	Mr. Verma	
1975	Salaakhen	Ramlal	
1975	Sandhya		
1975	Toofan		
1976	Charas	Jango	
1976	Dus Numbri	Fernandes Uncle	
1976	Sajjo Rani	Sohan	
1976	Samasya		
1977	Aafat		
1977	Chaalu Mera Naam	Balwant Rai	
1977	Darinda	Krishna's Father	
1977	Darling Darling	Dinanath	
1977	Immaan Dharam	Lawyer (in Jenny's Case)	
1977	Khel Khilari Ka	Poojari	
1977	Mamta	Boarding School Principal	
1978	Chor Ke Ghar Chor	Ramlal	
1979	Dhongee	Dinanath	
1980	Dhan Daulat	Truck owner	
1980	Do Aur Do Paanch	Om Prakash Sharma	
1980	Dostana	Ramnik Lal Tiwari	
1980	Qatil Kaun	Chaudhary	
1980	Taxi Chor		
1981	Haqdaar		
1981	Kaalia	2nd Defense Attorney	
1981	Krodhi		
1981	Nai Imarat	Village Head	
1981	Prem Geet	Hiralal	
1981	Professor Pyarelal	Bhagwan Singh	
1981	Raksha	Kedar	
1982	Hathkadi	Robert's father	Uncredited
1982	Khud-Daar	Man in Police Station	Uncredited
1982	Log Kya Kahenge	Thakur - Roma's father	
1983	Achha Bura	Jailor	
1983	Coolie	Salma's Father	
1984	Hum Do Hamare Do		
1984	Love Marriage		
1985	Aandhi-Toofan	Sheila's servant	
1985	Phir Aayee Barsaat		
1986	Maqqaar		
1986	Shatru		
1987	Mera Karam Mera Dharam	Shambhu	
1996	Aatank	Simon	Uncredited
1996	Mutthi Bhar Zameen	Munshiji	Final film appearance

== Television ==
Year	Show	Character/role
1985-1988	Vikram Aur Betaal (TV series)	Betaal
