= Aakhri Dao (1958 film) =

- Directed by: Mahesh Kaul
- Produced by: Shekhar
- Starring: Shekhar; Nutan
- Music by: Madan Mohan
- Release date: 1958
- Country: India
- Language: Hindi

Aakhri Dao is a 1958 Indian Hindi-language film directed by Mahesh Kaul. It was produced by Shekhar, who also starred alongside Nutan. The film features a soundtrack composed by Madan Mohan.

The film was reviewed by The Times of India under the title, "Shekhar's Aakhri Dao Is A Sparkling Comedy". Released in Bombay on 31 October 1958, it was reportedly popular with audiences.

== Cast ==
- Shekhar
- Nutan
- Johnny Walker
- Shubha Khote
- Kamal Kapoor
- Jeevan
- Shammi
- Minoo Mumtaz
