= Shekhar (actor) =

Indian actor and film producer

- Born: 8 October 1923; Dehradun, United Provinces, British India
- Died: Canada
- Occupations: Actor; film producer
- Years active: 1950–1968

Shekhar was an Indian actor and film producer. A leading actor in Hindi cinema during the 1950s, he starred in over 20 films which include Aankhen (1950), Chamkee (1952), Chandni Chowk (1954), Musafir (1957), and Ankh Micholi (1962).

Shekhar's credits as producer include Chhote Babu (1957), Aakhri Dao (1958), and Bank Manager (1959); he also acted in these films.

Apna Ghar Apni Kahani, a long-delayed project which released in 1968, marked Shekhar's final film as both an actor and a producer. He subsequently migrated to Canada, where he died in anonymity.

== Life and career ==
Shekhar was born on 8 October 1923 in Dehradun, in a family of three brothers and four sisters. He was educated in Meerut from the age of six and graduated from Agra University. Interested in acting from childhood, he worked for two years at All India Radio (AIR).

In June 1947, Shekhar travelled to Bombay during a short holiday. According to journalist Sushila Rani Patel, he met actors Motilal and Ashok Kumar, whom he admired, and the encounters encouraged him to pursue a career in films. Producer Devendra Goel subsequently cast him as the lead in Aankhen (1950), opposite Nalini Jaywant.

Following Aankhen, Shekhar appeared in Hamari Beti (1950), co-starring Motilal and Nutan, as well as in Badi Bahu and Adaa (both 1951). He subsequently demonstrated his versatility by playing dual characters with contrasting personalities in Chamkee (1952).

Among Shekhar's subsequent films were Hamdard (1953), Chandni Chowk (1954), Darwaza (1954), and Musafir (1957). His female co-stars during this period included Nimmi, Meena Kumari, Shyama, Suchitra Sen, Nutan and Kamini Kaushal, while his directors included B. R. Chopra, Shahid Lateef, P. L. Santoshi and Hrishikesh Mukherjee.

Shekhar later moved into film production. Journalist Deepa Gahlot writes that his acting career was relatively short-lived and that he became a producer of films including Chhote Babu (1957), Aakhri Dao (1958) and Bank Manager (1959). These films were generally well-received by critics.

His final film, Pyas, was stalled. It was eventually released in 1968 under the title Apna Ghar Apni Kahani. Gahlot writes that Shekhar was facing financial difficulties by the time of its release. He subsequently emigrated to Canada and died there in anonymity.

== Reception ==
Shekhar's early screen performances received mixed reviews. The Motion Picture Magazine, reviewing his debut in Aankhen (1950), described him as a newcomer who "looks it" and considered his facial expressions excessive, although noting that he performed better in the second half of the film. His performance in Hamari Beti (1950) received a more favourable assessment from the same publication, with the reviewer noting that Shekhar had "improved distinctly" from Aankhen and suggested that, with better direction and appropriate casting, he could develop further.

In a profile of Shekhar in Stars of The Indian Screen (1952), author Sushila Rani Patel noted that although some actors required several films to become accustomed to the medium, Shekhar performed his first leading role with considerable ease. Patel further described Shekhar as a serious actor, considering his work in Chamkee (1952) the evidence of his ability to portray contrasting characters.

Retrospectively, film historian Ashok Raj characterises Shekhar's acting style as understated and realistic, observing that he avoided excessive theatricality and was frequently cast as virtuous, ordinary young men in a series of mid-budget social films. At the same time, Raj regards Shekhar as one of the "least appreciated" leading actors of his era.

== Filmography ==
Year	Title	Roles	Notes	Ref.
1950	Aankhen			
1950	Bahurani			
1950	Hamari Beti			
1951	Adaa			
1951	Badi Bahu			
1951	Sabz Bagh			
1952	Chamkee			
1952	Do Raha			
1953	Aas			
1953	Aansoo			
1953	Hamdard			
1953	Naya Ghar			
1954	Chandni Chowk	Akbar		
1954	Darwaza			
1954	Sangam			
1954	Toote Khilone			
1955	Bindiya			
1955	Chingari			
1955	Shikar			
1957	Abhimaan			
1957	Chhote Babu		Also producer	
1957	Musafir	Ajay Sharma		
1958	Aakhri Dao	Raj Saxena	Also producer	
1958	Kabhi Andhera Kabhi Ujala			
1959	Bank Manager		Also producer	
1961	Hum Matwale Naujawan			
1962	Ankh Micholi	Manohar		
1962	Dilli Ka Dada			
1968	Apna Ghar Apni Kahani		Also producer	
