= Hum Matwale Naujawan =

- Directed by: L. R. Asthana
- Starring: Shekhar; Sayeeda Khan
- Music by: Chitragupt
- Release date: 1961
- Country: India
- Language: Hindi

Hum Matwale Naujawan is a 1961 Indian Hindi-language film directed by L. R. Asthana. The film stars Shekhar and Sayeeda Khan, alongside a supporting cast which includes Jeevan, Lillian, Agha, and Chaman Puri. It features a soundtrack composed by Chitragupt.

Hum Matwale Naujawan was released in Bombay at New Roshan Theatre in March 1962.
