= Arzoo (1950 film) =

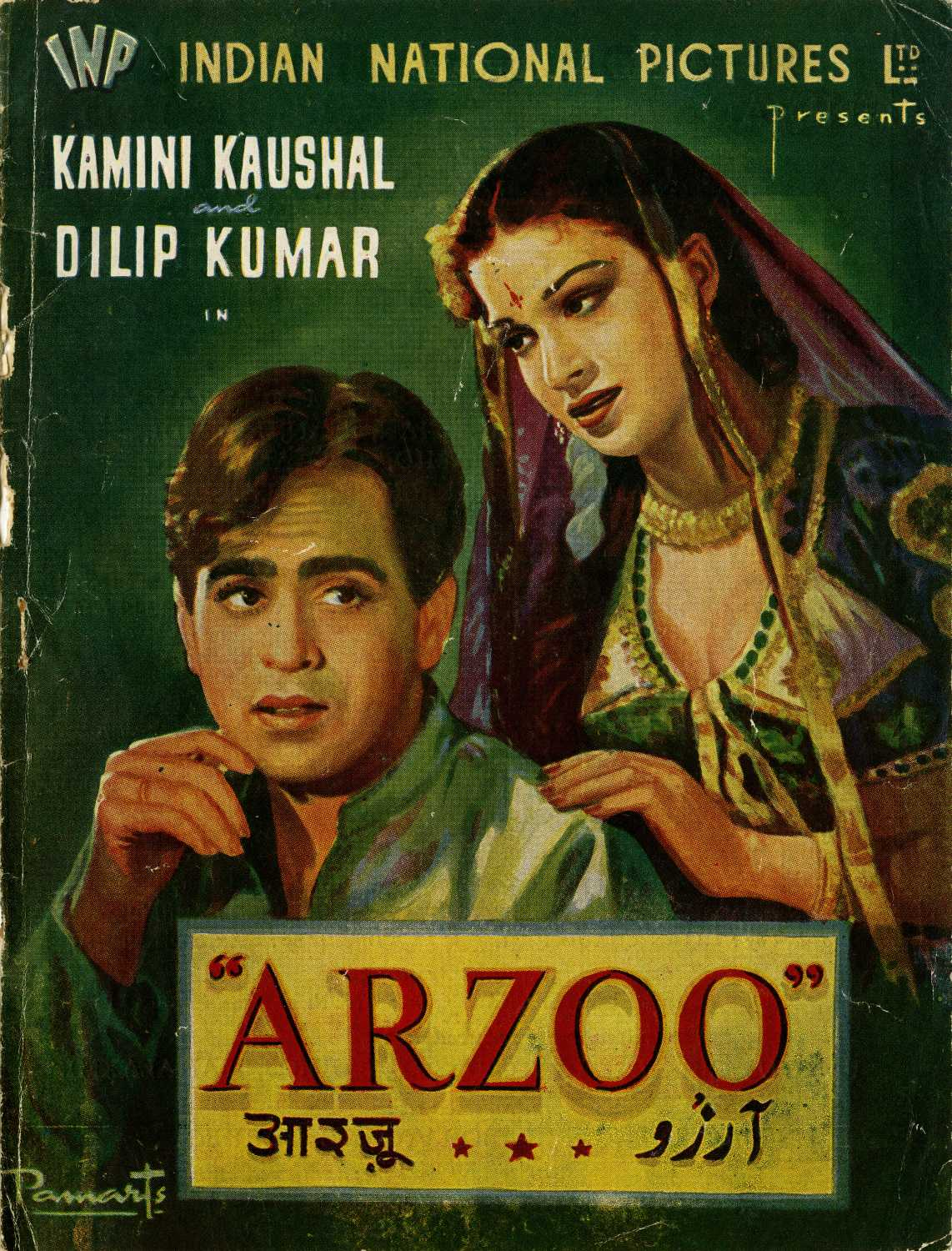
- Film poster
- Directed by: Shaheed Latif
- Written by: Ismat Chugtai
- Based on: Wuthering Heights by Emily Brontë
- Produced by: Hiten Chowdhary
- Starring: Dilip Kumar; Kamini Kaushal; Shashikala
- Cinematography: S Srivastava
- Edited by: J. S. Diwadkar
- Music by: Anil Biswas
- Release date: 16 June 1950
- Country: India
- Language: Hindi

Arzoo (lit. 'Desire') is a 1950 Indian Hindi-language romantic drama film directed by Shaheed Latif and produced by Hiten Chaudhary. The film stars Dilip Kumar, Kamini Kaushal and Shashikala. The film's music is by Anil Biswas. Cuckoo appears as a dancer in the song "Aao Milke Jawani Ki Loote Bahaar". It is loosely based on Emily Brontë's 1847 novel Wuthering Heights.

== Cast ==
- Dilip Kumar as Badal (based on Heathcliff)
- Kamini Kaushal as Kamini "Kammo" (based on Catherine Earnshaw)
- Shashikala as Kamla
- Gope as Randhir
- Cuckoo as Dancer

== Soundtrack ==
Song	Singer
"Ae Dil Mujhe Aisi Jagah"	Talat Mahmood
"Mila Gaye Nain"	Sudha Malhotra
"Jana Na Dil Se Door"	Lata Mangeshkar
"Kahan Tak Hum"	Lata Mangeshkar
"Mera Naram Karajwa"	Lata Mangeshkar
"Aayi Bahar, Jiya Dole Mora"	Lata Mangeshkar
"Unhe Hum Jo Dil Se"	Lata Mangeshkar
"Hamen Maar Chala"	Anil Biswas
"Tose Bichhadke"	Anil Biswas
"Jao Sidharo, Hey Radha Ke Shyam, Laj Tumhare Hath Hai, Dekho Preet Na Ho Badnaam"	Shamshad Begum, S. D. Batish, Mukesh
