= Dharkan =

- Directed by: Devendra Goel
- Starring: Sanjay Khan; Rajendra Nath; Mumtaz
- Release date: 30 June 1972
- Country: India
- Language: Hindi

Dharkan is a 1972 Indian film directed by Devendra Goel. The movie stars Sanjay Khan, Mumtaz, Rajendra Nath, Helen, Alankar Joshi, Roopesh Kumar and Bindu (in a cameo role). It was produced and directed by Devendra Goyal, and the music was given by Ravi.

== Plot ==
It is the story of the rebirth of millionaire child Deepak Rai, who accidentally shoots his friend, Suraj Prakash (Sanjay Khan) at the age of 10 and believing him to be dead, runs away from home. 14 years later, Deepak discovers that Suraj Prakash is not dead and decides to go back home with friend Kewal Sharma (Roopesh Kumar). On discovering that Deepak is a millionnaire, Kewal Sharma kills Deepak on the train journey to Deepak's home city (Anandgiri) and starts living Deepak's life. Meanwhile, the real Deepak Rai (killed) is reborn as Rekha's (Mumtaz's) brother. 5 years later, Kewal Sharma marries Rekha, who is Suraj Prakash's girlfriend. On discovering that Rekha's husband is a drunkard and a womaniser, Rekha's father dies of a heart attack and Rekha's brother (Doby, rebirth of actual Deepak Rai) comes to stay in Deepak Rai's house. Doby, aged 5 by now, knows all about the house and the estate, although he has never been there before in his present life. Suraj Prakash and friend, Inspector Darshan (Rajendra Nath) figure out the mystery behind Doby's familiarity of the place and decide to collect enough evidence against Kewal Sharma to prove him guilty of his crime of murder and deceit.

== Characters ==
- Sanjay Khan ... Suraj Prakash
- Mumtaz ... Rekha D. Prasad
- Rajendra Nath ... Inspector Darshan K. Lal
- Helen ... Laajwanti
- Bindu ... Prostitute
- Roopesh Kumar ... Kewal Sharma

== Soundtrack ==
Track#	Title	Singer(s)
1	"Main To Chala Jidhar Chale Rasta"	Kishore Kumar
2	"Maine Pehli Baar Dekha Gussa"	Kishore Kumar, Asha Bhosle
3	"Tumse Nazar Mili Milte Hi Jhookane"	Kishore Kumar, Asha Bhosle, Ravi
4	"Main Aaya Tere Dwaare"	Lata Mangeshkar
5	"Jab Tu Ne Kuch Na Kiya"	Asha Bhosle, Manna Dey
6	"Pee Meri Aankhon Se Aa Meri Baahon Mein"	Asha Bhosle
7	"So Jaa Mere Laal So Jaa Madhur Suron Mein Nindiya Gaaye"	Lata Mangeshkar
8	"Mere Dost Tujhe Tera Meet Mubarak"	Mohammed Rafi
