= Ankh Micholi =

- Directed by: Ravindra Dave
- Screenplay by: Balkrishna Mauj
- Story by: Balkrishna Mauj
- Starring: Mala Sinha; Shekhar
- Cinematography: Mohan Keshwani
- Edited by: Hari Pathare
- Music by: Chitragupt
- Production company: Varma Productions
- Distributed by: Varma Productions
- Release date: 1962
- Country: India
- Language: Hindi

Ankh Micholi (Hindi for "Hide and Seek") is a 1962 Bollywood film directed by Ravindra Dave and starring Mala Sinha in the lead role with Shekhar, S. Nazir, Jagdish Raj, Leela Mishra and Naazi in supporting roles. The film was distributed and produced by Varma Productions, an affiliate of Varma Films. Ankh Micholi marked the second time its filmmakers had cast Mala Sinha in a lead role after previously casting her in Main Nashe Mein Hoon (1959). Both Ankh Micholi and Main Nashe Mein Hoon are considered to be some of the most "memorable films" of Mala Sinha.

The prominence of Ankh Micholi arises from the ensemble compiled by the filmmakers for the film. First, Ravindra Dave, the director of the film, was a prolific director, having made more than 30 Hindi movies during his career. Dave was particularly renowned for making murder mysteries, which led him to "being dubbed the Alfred Hitchcock of India". As director ability can be genre-specific, Dave's specialty for the murder mystery genre was particularly relevant for Ankh Micholi whose narrative centers around the unusual case of the female lead in the film being accused of two consecutive murders that she presumably did commit. Second, Mala Sinha, the lead actress, of Ankh Micholi was at the prime of her career as evidenced by her being the highest paid actress (along with Vyjanthimala) in the year the Ankh Micholi released. Finally, given the widespread conviction about the importance of an Indian film's songs in the commercial success of the film, the significance of Ankh Micholi arises from its songs being composed by Chitragupt, a "renowned" Hindi film music director of 1950s and 1960s, with the song Woh to Jatte Jatte Humse Khafa from the film being rated by some as a "beautiful masterpiece." Ankh Micholi, released during the Golden Age of Hindi Cinema which unfolded from the late 1940s to the 1960s, exemplifies how filmmakers during this period, attempted to combine renowned stars, directors and music composers for the commercial success of a film.

== Plot ==
When a maid discovers the dead body of her mistress, Lady Hiramani, and Mala, the secretary of Lady Hiramani running away from the body, she immediately calls the police. The car in which Mala escaped is followed by the police with the chase ending when the car smashes on a bridge and turns upside down. However, the police are unable to locate Mala or her corpse.

When Mala's death and her connection with the murder of Lady Hiramani are reported by the newspapers, Mala decides to change her name to Nayantara and starts working as a dancer in the Venus Theater, where she achieves considerable success. Other people associated with the theater enter the plot including Agha, the theater's manager, his assistant Dilip, Shivram, a lawyer who provides legal services to the theater and Tara, another prominent dancer for the theater.

One day when Nayantara returns home after a performance at the Venus Theater, she is surprised to find an intruder in her bedroom who claims to be her husband, Manohar. When she pulls a pistol on him and asks him to get out of her bedroom or she will kill him, he remains puzzled by her response and refuses to leave. The next day, Nayantara is arrested by Inspector Jagdish while she has a pistol in her hand and the police find the lifeless body of Manohar in the bedroom.

Nayantara, also known as Mala, is now accused of two murders. The movie progresses with unraveling the circumstances surrounding the deaths of Lady Hiramani and Manohar by introducing new characters into the plot including Mala's brother, and their mother, Geeta Bhalla, so viewers can decide whether Mala (alias Nayantara) is indeed guilty of the murders she has been accused of committing.

== Cast ==
- Mala Sinha as Mala/Nayantara
- Shekhar as Manohar, Nayantara's husband
- Jagdish Raj as Inspector Jagdish
- Naazi as Tara, a prominent dancer at Venus Theater
- Balam as Agha, Manager of Venus Theater
- Dilip Dutt as Agha's assistant
- S Nazir, as Vishram, a lawyer working for Venus Theater
- Leela Mishra as Geeta Bhalla, Mala's mother
- Manohar as Mala's brother

== Soundtrack ==
The soundtrack of Ankh Micholi was composed by Chitragupt and the lyrics were written by Majrooh Sultanpuri.

Track #	Song	Singer(s)	Lyricist
1	"Woh To Jate Jate Humse Khafa Ho Gaye"	Mukesh	Majrooh Sultanpuri
2	"Suniye To Zaraa Kahaan Ruth Ke Chalee"	Mukesh	Majrooh Sultanpuri
3	" Chaliye Ji Bewafa Hai Hum Nazare Churane Vale Tumhi Toh Kam Nahi Babu"	Lata Mangeshkar	Majrooh Sultanpuri
4	" Ho Ek Nazar Idhar Bhi"	Lata Mangeshkar	Majrooh Sultanpuri
5	" Jalega Jahan Sanam Chup Rahiye Diya Tumhe Dil Kisi Se Mat Kahiye"	Lata Mangeshkar	Majrooh Sultanpuri
6	" Tumhi Ne Chhup Chhup Ke Dil Ko Uchh"	Geeta Dutt	Majrooh Sultanpuri
