= Mahesh Kaul =

Indian film director

- Mahesh Kaul in 1970
- Born: 10 April 1911; Jodhpur State, British India
- Died: 2 July 1972 (aged 61); Mumbai
- Occupations: Producer director Screenwriter Actor
- Children: Monika Kaul; Roopesh Kaul
- Awards: 6th Filmfare Awards – Nomination as Best Director for film Talaaq (1958); 10th National Film Awards – Sautela Bhai (1962); National Film Award for Best Feature Film in Hindi – Pyar Ki Pyaas (1961)

Mahesh Kaul (10 April 1911 – 2 July 1972) was an Indian film director, screenwriter and actor who primarily worked in Bollywood film industry during his career span. Kaul is known for his contribution to the cinema of India. He mainly worked as a director in several films such as Talaq, Jeewan Jyoti, Diwana, Sapnon Ka Saudagar, among others.

== Biography ==
Mahesh was born on 10 April 1911 in Jodhpur State, British India. He originally worked in films as a lyricist and dialogue-writer and made his first entry in Bollywood with Naya Sansar (1941) film, which was filmed in Mumbai, starring Ashok Kumar and Renuka Devi.

== Education ==
Born in 1911 in Jodhpur, Mahesh completed his education at Moni College, Nagpur.

== Career ==
Mahesh was initially working as a journalist and had served as a Branch manager in a bank. He initially established his career in Bollywood films as a lyricist and a dialogue writer and made an early entry when he first acted in Naya Sansar (1941) movie. During the same career span, He acted in a bilingual film-drama Apna Ghar (1942) which was directed by Debaki Bose and later, made a major impact by playing as a dialogue-writer's role in another bilingual film Mahatma Vidur (1943). While working in Hindi films as a director, His first film was Angoori (1943). As a director, his first superhit film was Gopinath (1948), starring Raj Kapoor and Tripti Mitra. When directed a popular film, His next film after Gopinath was Naujawan (1951), which also earned nationwide popularity in India.

Mahesh played a role in Guru Dutt's Kaagaz Ke Phool (1959) film where he was seen playing Guru Dutt's westernized father-in-law. He agreed to act in the film at his close friend Guru Dutt’s request. It was widely perceived that the character he played - Sir B B Verma - was a satirical take on Baburao Patel, the legendary editor of Film India magazine, who was the most feared film critic of the time.

Soon thereafter, Mahesh made another popular film Pyar ki Pyaas (1961) and Sautela Bhai (1962) in which Guru Dutt played the protagonist and this has widely been considered his best performance as an actor. Kaul made Rakhi Rakhi (1969) for the Film Institute of India and his last film was Agni Rekha starring Sanjeev Kumar and Sharada, released posthumously in 1973 as Kaul had died the previous year.

== Personal life ==
Mahesh was married late in life (at the age of 50) to Indira Malkani, known later as Indira Mahesh Kaul. It was a love marriage. They had a daughter Monika Kaul and a son Roopesh Kaul. Mahesh was the adopted son of "Bhola Nath Kaul" and "Kailash Rani Kaul" and he was the biological son of "Bhishambher Nath Kaul" and "Chando Kaul". The popular filmmaker, Mahesh was the brother of "Jainath Kaul", "Iqbal Nath Kaul", "Munishwar Nath" and "Rameshwar Nath Kaul". His nephew Mani Kaul, a celebrated filmmaker, was credited as one of the filmmakers responsible for the ‘new wave’ in Indian cinema.

== Filmography ==
- Angoori (1943)
- Paristan (1944)
- Gopinath (1948)
- Naujawan (1951)
- Jeewan Jyoti (1953)
- Abhimaan (1957)
- Aakhri Dao (1958/I)
- Miya Bibi Razi (1960)
- Pyar Ki Pyas (1961)
- Sautela Bhai (1962)
- Palki (1967)
- Diwana (1967)
- Sapnon Ka Saudagar (1968)
- Rakhi Rakhi (1969)
- Agni Rekha (1973)

== Awards ==
- [6th Filmfare Awards] – Nominated for Filmfare Award for Best Director – Talaq (1958) was also nominated as Best Film
- 9th National Film Awards – National Film Award for Best Feature Film in Hindi (Bronze) – Pyaar Ki Pyaas (1961)
- 10th National Film Awards – National Film Award for Best Direction – Sautela Bhai (1962)
