= Chukti Bhar Senur =

Chutki Bhar Senur
- Directed by: Nazir Hussain
- Starring: Kunal Singh; Hina Kausar; Nazir Hussain
- Music by: Chitragupt
- Production company: Roona Films
- Release date: 1983
- Country: India
- Language: Bhojpuri

Chukti Bhar Senur (Bhojpuri for A pinch of vermillion) is a 1983 Bhojpuri-language film directed by Nazir Hussain, the pioneering filmmaker widely regarded as the Pitamah (patriarch) of Bhojpuri cinema. Produced under the banner of Roona Films, the film stars Kunal Singh, Hina Kausar, and Nazir Hussain in the lead roles, with Raza Murad and Leela Mishra in supporting parts. The soundtrack was composed by Chitragupt.

== Cast ==
- Kunal Singh as the male lead
- Hina Kausar as the female lead
- Nazir Hussain
- Raza Murad
- Leela Mishra

== Soundtrack ==
The soundtrack of Chutki Bhar Senur was composed by Chitragupt, with lyrics penned by Majrooh Sultanpuri.

#	Song	Singer(s)
1	"Dag Lagake Gharbar"	Mahendra Kapoor
2	"Chirai To Chirai Baheliya"	Usha Mangeshkar, Udit Narayan
3	"Mastani Okar Chal Ba"	Asha Bhosle, Usha Mangeshkar
4	"Kahe Hamra Se Parda Ba" (also known as "Koi Hamre Se Parda Ba")	Mahendra Kapoor, Suresh Wadkar
5	"Na To Hamke Sobe De"	Usha Mangeshkar, Suresh Wadkar
6	"Kahban Lagbale Etni Der"	Usha Mangeshkar, Priti Sagar
