= Fareb (1953 film) =

- Directed by: Ismat Chugtai; Shaheed Latif
- Written by: Ismat Chugtai
- Starring: Kishore Kumar; Zohra Sehgal; Lalita Pawar
- Music by: Anil Biswas
- Release date: 1953
- Country: India
- Language: Hindi

Fareb is a 1953 Indian Hindi-language film written by Ismat Chugtai, and co-directed by Chugtai and Shaheed Latif. The film's music was composed by Anil Biswas. It stars Kishore Kumar, Zohra Sehgal, and Lalita Pawar. The film performed well at the box office.

A contemporary Filmfare review described Fareb as a horror drama, characterized by "lighted candles floating in the air" and "doors opening and shutting by themselves". Authors Anirudha Bhattacharjee and Parthiv Dhar regard the film as a precursor to the Ramsay Brothers films of the 1970s.

Fareb was one of Kishore Kumar's earliest films as a lead actor, and significantly differed from his subsequent work as a comedian.

== Cast ==
- Kishore Kumar
- Lalita Pawar
- Zohra Sehgal
- Amar
- Maya Daas
