= Saiyan (film) =

1951 film

- Original theatrical release poster
- Directed by: M. Sadiq
- Written by: Azim Bazidpuri
- Produced by: M. Sadiq
- Starring: Madhubala; Ajit; Sajjan; Jayant
- Edited by: Moosa Mansoor
- Music by: Sajjad Hussain
- Production company: Sadiq Productions Ltd
- Release date: 21 September 1951
- Running time: 120 minutes
- Country: India
- Language: Hindi

Saiyan (transl. "Beloved") is a 1951 Bollywood film-Hindi romantic drama directed by M. Sadiq for his Sadiq Productions Ltd. The story and screenplay were written by Azmi Bazidpuri. The music was composed by Sajjad Hussain, with lyrics written by D. N. Madhok, Rajendra Krishan and Hasrat Jaipuri. The film stars Madhubala, Ajit, Sajjan, and Jayant. The film was a critical and commercial success.

== Plot ==
A period film depicting feudal India, the plot is remade from the American Western Duel In the Sun (1946). A love triangle, the story revolves around two brothers (Ajit and Sajjan), both in love with an orphan girl (Madhubala), who is given shelter by their family.

== Cast ==
- Madhubala as Saiyan
- Ajit as Vijay
- Sajjan as Rajjoo
- Raj Mehra as Thakor Sahib
- Leela Chitnis as Rani Sahiba
- Jayant
- Abbas
- Ramesh Thakur
- Ramesh Sinha
- Amar
- Amir Ali
- Kathana
- Cuckoo

== Soundtrack ==
The music composer was Sajjad Hussain with lyrics by D. N. Madhok and Rajendra Krishan. The playback singers were Lata Mangeshkar, Mohammed Rafi and Shamshad Begum. The song "Tumhe Dil Diya" sung by Lata Mangeshkar, was not used in the film.

=== Songlist ===
#	Title	Singer	Lyricist
1	"Woh Raat Din Vo Shaam Ki Guzari Hui Kahaaniyaan"	Lata Mangeshkar	D. N. Madhok
2	"Tumhe Dil Diya"	Lata Mangeshkar	D. N. Madhok
3	"Kaali Kaali Raat Re Dil Bada Sataye"	Lata Mangeshkar	D. N. Madhok
4	"Us Par Is Diwar Ke Jo Rahte Hai"	Mohammed Rafi	D. N. Madhok
5	"Hawa Mein Dil Dole Machal Kar Bole"	Lata Mangeshkar	Rajendra Krishan
6	"Kismat Mein Khushi Ka Naam Nahin"	Lata Mangeshkar	Rajendra Krishan
7	"Meri Jaan Mohabbat Karo Chupke Chupke"	Shamshad Begum	Rajendra Krishan
8	"Khayalon Mein Tum Ho, Nazaaron Mein Tum Ho"	Lata Mangeshkar	Hasrat Jaipuri

== Reception ==
Roger Yue of Singapore Free Press praised the film's "splendour and magnificence" and stated that it is "cleverly directed and well-photographed". Yue added that Madhubala portrayed the titular character "to perfection".

Saiyan was popular with audiences and performed well at the box office. Writer Ganga Prasad Sharma called Saiyan the best film starring Sajjan in the leading role.
