= Ismat Chughtai =

Indian writer and filmmaker (1915–1991)

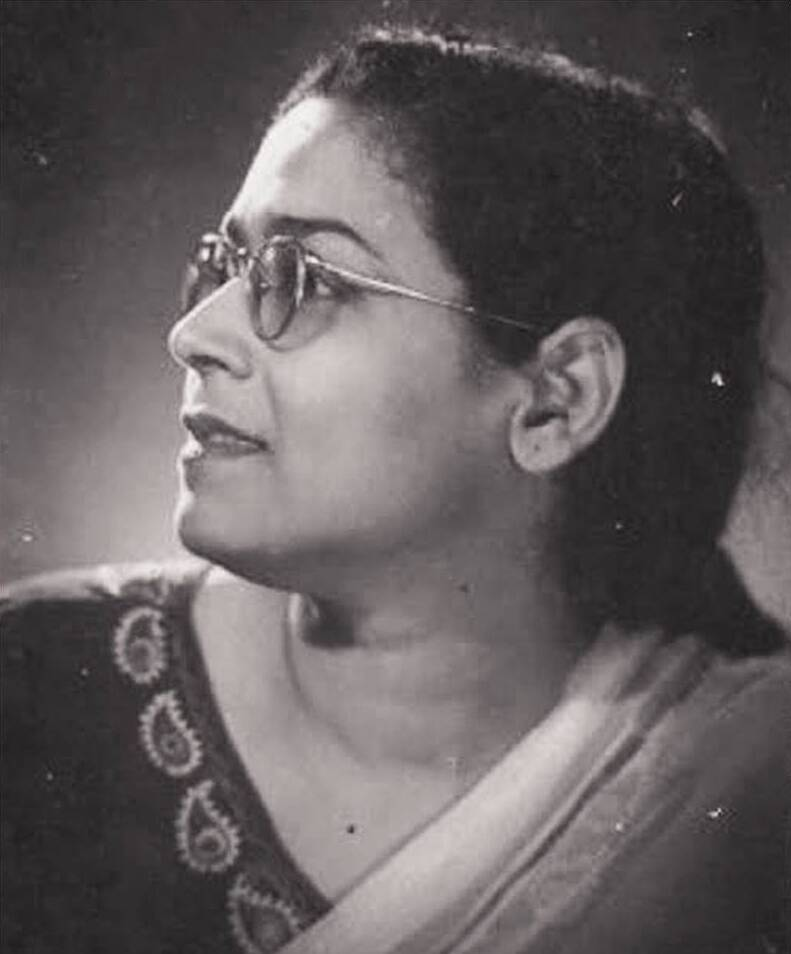
- Born: 21 August 1911; Budaun, United Provinces, British India (now Uttar Pradesh, India)
- Died: 24 October 1991 (aged 80); Bombay (now Mumbai), Maharashtra, India
- Education: Aligarh Muslim University
- Occupations: Writer; filmmaker; essayist
- Spouse: Shaheed Latif
- Children: Seema Sawhny; Sabrina Lateef
- Writing career
- Language: Urdu
- Genres: Short stories; novel; plays
- Notable works: Works of Ismat Chughtai

Ismat Chughtai (21 August 1911 – 24 October 1991) was an Indian Urdu novelist, short story writer, liberal humanist and filmmaker. Beginning in the 1930s, she wrote extensively on themes including female sexuality and femininity, middle-class gentility, and class conflict, often from a Marxist perspective. With a style characterised by literary realism, Chughtai established herself as a significant voice in the Urdu literature of the twentieth century, and in 1976 was awarded the Padma Shri by the Government of India.

== Biography ==
=== Early life and career beginnings (1911–41) ===
Ismat Chughtai was born on 21 August 1911 in Badayun, Uttar Pradesh to Nusrat Khanam and Mirza Qaseem Baig Chughtai; she was the ninth of ten children—six brothers and four sisters. The family moved frequently as Chughtai's father was a civil servant; she spent her childhood in cities including Jodhpur, Agra, and Aligarh—mostly in the company of her brothers as her sisters had all got married when she was still very young. Chughtai described her brothers' influence as a key factor that shaped her personality during her formative years. She thought of her second-eldest brother, Mirza Azim Beg Chughtai (also a novelist), as a mentor. The family eventually settled in Agra, after Chughtai's father retired from the Indian Civil Services.

Chughtai received her primary education at the Women's College at the Aligarh Muslim University and graduated from Isabella Thoburn College with a Bachelor of Arts degree in 1940. Despite strong resistance from her family, she completed her Bachelor of Education degree from the Aligarh Muslim University the following year. It was during this period that Chughtai became associated with the Progressive Writers' Association, having attended her first meeting in 1936 where she met Rashid Jahan, one of the leading female writers involved with the movement, who was later credited for inspiring Chughtai to write "realistic, challenging female characters". Chughtai began writing in private around the same time, but did not seek publication of her work until much later.

When I started writing, there was a trend -- writing romantic things or writing like a Progressive. When I started to write, people were very shocked because I wrote very frankly [...] I didn't write what you'd call "literarily." I wrote and do write as I speak, in a very simple language, not the literary language.

— Chughtai on her early writings, in a 1972 interview with Mahfil.

Chughtai wrote a drama entitled Fasādī (The Troublemaker) for the Urdu magazine Saqi in 1939, which was her first published work. Upon publication, readers mistook it as a play by Chughtai's brother Azeem Beg, written using a pseudonym. Following that, she started writing for other publications and newspapers. Some of her early works included Bachpan (Childhood), an autobiographical piece, Kafir (Infidel), her first short-story, and Dheet (Stubborn), her only soliloquy, among others. In response to a story that she wrote for a magazine, Chughtai was told that her work was blasphemous and insulted the Quran. She, nonetheless, continued writing about "things she would hear of".

Chughtai's continued association with the Progressive Writers' Movement had significant bearings on her writing style; she was particularly intrigued by Angarey, a compilation of short-stories written in Urdu by members of the group including Jahan, Sajjad Zaheer, Sahibzada Mahmuduzaffar and Ahmed Ali. Other early influences included such writers as William Sydney Porter, George Bernard Shaw, and Anton Chekhov. Kalyān (Buds) and Cōtēn (Wounds), two of Chughtai's earliest collections of short stories, were published in 1941 and 1942, respectively.

Chughtai's first novella Ziddi, which she had written in her early twenties was first published in 1941. The book chronicles the love affair between a woman, who works as domestic help in an affluent household and her employer's son. Chughtai later discussed the similarity in themes and style of the novel with the works of the romantic novelist Hijab Imtiaz Ali, citing her as another early influence. Commentators have praised the novella, both for its "compelling prose" and for providing "[glimpses] into a world where women try to break out of the shackles created by other women, rather than men". Critic and short story writer Aamer Hussein, in a 2015 retrospective review, likened Chughtai's "oracular voice, which didn't comment or explain, but studded the narrative with poetic observations" to that of American author Toni Morrison. Ziddi was later translated into English as Wild at Heart and adapted into a 1948 feature film of the same name.

=== Niche appreciation and transition to film (1942–60) ===
After completing her Bachelor's of Education degree, Chughtai successfully applied for the post of headmistress of an Aligarh-based Girls school. There, she met and developed a close friendship with Shaheed Latif, who was pursuing a master's degree at the Aligarh Muslim University at the time. Chughtai continued to write for various publications during her stay at Aligarh. She found success with such short-stories as Gainda and Khidmatgaar and the play Intikhab, all of which were published during the period. She then moved to Bombay in 1942 and began working as an Inspectress of schools. Later that year, she married Latif, who was now working as a dialogue writer in Bollywood, in a private ceremony. Khwaja Ahmad Abbas was the legal witness to the ceremony.

Chughtai garnered widespread attention for her short-story Lihaaf (The Quilt), which appeared in a 1942 issue of Adab-i-Latif, a Lahore-based literary journal. Inspired by the rumoured affair of a begum and her masseuse in Aligarh, the story chronicles the sexual awakening of Begum Jan following her unhappy marriage with a nawab. Upon release, Lihaaf attracted criticism for its suggestion of female homosexuality and a subsequent trial, with Chughtai being summoned by the Lahore High Court to defend herself against the charges of "obscenity". Fellow writer and member of the Progressive Writers' Movement Sadat Hassan Manto was also charged with similar allegations for his short-story Bu (Odour) and accompanied Chughtai to Lahore. Both Chughtai and Manto were exonerated.

The trial, which took place in 1945, itself drew much media and public attention and brought notoriety to the duo. Chughtai fared better in the public eye, having garnered support from such fellow members of the Progressive Writers' Movement as Majnun Gorakhpuri and Krishan Chander. Regardless, she detested the media coverage of the whole incident, which in her view weighted heavily upon her subsequent work; "[Lihaaf] brought me so much notoriety that I got sick of life. It became the proverbial stick to beat me with and whatever I wrote afterwards got crushed under its weight."

We stood face to face during a dinner. I felt the ground under my feet receding. She cruised through the crowd, leaped at me and took me in her arms [...] I felt like throwing myself into someone’s arms and crying my heart out. She invited me to a fabulous dinner. I felt fully rewarded when I saw her flower-like boy. I felt he was mine as well. A part of my mind, a living product of my brain. An offspring of my pen.

— Chughtai on her meeting with the woman who was the inspiration behind Lihaaf

Chughtai, however, is known to have made her peace with the whole fiasco, having met the woman who had inspired Begum Jan a few years after the publication of Lihaaf. The woman told Chughtai that she had since divorced her husband, remarried and was raising a child with her second husband. Chughtai's biographers recall the meeting between the two women in Ismat: Her life, Her times: "[Chughtai] felt greatly rewarded when the begum told [her that Lihaaf] had changed her life and it is because of her story now she was blessed with a child". Chughtai, who had been apprehensive about the meeting at first, later expressed her delight in a memoir, writing, "flowers can be made to bloom among rocks. The only condition is that one has to water the plant with one's heart's blood".

Chughtai's quasi-autobiographical novel Tedhi Lakeer (The Crooked Line) was released in 1943. She was pregnant with her daughter during the time. She recalled the difficult circumstances facing her during her work on the novel, in a 1972 interview with Mahfil: Journal of South Asian Literature: "[It was] during the war that I wrote my novel Terhi Lakeer, a big, thick novel. I was sick then, pregnant with my daughter. But I was always writing that novel". The book chronicles the lives of the Muslim community, women in particular, in the backdrop of the waning British Raj. Chughtai's exploration of the "inner realms of women's lives" was well received by critics who variously described her work in Tedhi Lakeer as "probing and pertinent" and "empowering". She herself recalled her creative process in the 1972 interview, saying she found inspiration from the small incidents that she would witness around her and even the personal conversations that took place amongst the women in her family, "I write about people I know or have known. What should a writer write about anyway"?

In the years following their wedding, Latif also introduced Chughtai to the Hindi film industry. She began writing scripts in the late 1940s and made her debut as a screenwriter for Latif's drama film Ziddi. Starring Kamini Kaushal, Pran, and Dev Anand in his first major film role, Ziddi became one of the biggest commercial successes of 1948. It was based on the 1941 eponymous short story; Chughtai had rewritten the narrative in form of a screenplay for the production. She then wrote the dialogue and screenplay for the 1950 romance drama film Arzoo, starring Kaushal and Dilip Kumar. Chughtai expanded her career into directing with the 1953 film Fareb, which featured an ensemble cast of Amar, Maya Daas, Kishore Kumar, Lalita Pawar, and Zohra Sehgal. Having again written the screenplay based on one of her short stories, Chughtai co-directed the film with Latif. Upon release, both Arzoo and Fareb garnered positive response from the audience and performed well at the box-office.

Chughtai's association with film solidified when she and Latif co-founded the production company Filmina. Her first project as a filmmaker was the 1958 drama film Sone Ki Chidiya, which she wrote and co-produced. Starring Nutan and Talat Mahmood in lead roles, it told the story of a child actor, who was abused and exploited over the course of her career. The film was well received by audiences and the success translated directly into a rise in Chughtai's popularity, as noted by writer and critic Shams Kanwal. Sone Ki Chidiya has been described as a significant production for "[chronicling] a heady time in Indian cinema" and showcasing the "grime behind the glamour" of the film industry. Nutan, who garnered a good response for her performance in the film, herself described it as one of her favorite projects. Also in 1958, Chughtai produced the Mahmood-Shyama starrer romance drama Lala Rukh.

Chughtai continued writing short-stories during the time despite her commitment to film projects. Her fourth collection of short-stories Chui Mui (Touch-me-not) was released in 1952 to an enthusiastic response. The eponymous short-story has been noted for its "pertinent dissection of our society" and contesting the venerated tradition of motherhood, especially its equation of womanhood. Rafay Mahmood highlighted, in a 2014 editorial, the relevance of the story in the twenty-first century. Chui Mui was adapted for stage by Naseeruddin Shah as a part of a commemorative series Ismat Apa Kay Naam, with his daughter Heeba Shah playing the central character in the production.

=== Success with writing novels (1961–90) ===
Beginning in the 1960s, Chughtai wrote a total of eight novels, the first of which was Masooma (The Innocent Girl), published in 1962. The film follows the life of a young actress, Nilofar, who is forced to work as call girl to sustain her family once her father abandons them. Set in the Bombay of 1950s, the novel delves into the themes of sexual exploitation and social and economic injustice. Her next work, the 1966 novella Saudai (Obsession) was based on the screenplay of 1951 film Buzdil, which she co-wrote with Latif. Commentators have noted that Saudai could never shed its structure and still read like a screenplay despite Chughtai's efforts.

Following a lukewarm reception for both Masooma and Saudai, Chughtai received significant praise for her fifth novel Dil ki Duniya (The Heart Breaks Free). Reviewing the novel, observers have placed it second only to Tedhi Lakeer in the canon of her work. The novel follows the lives of a varied group of women living in a conservative Muslim household in Uttar Pradesh. Dil Ki Duniya, much like Tedhi Lakeer, is autobiographical in nature as Chughtai drew heavily from her own childhood in Bahraich, Uttar Pradesh. Comparing the two, Hussein says, "if Tedhi Lakeer impressed me with its boldness, range and its credentials as a major novel, Dil ki Duniya's influence would linger with me forever, and I'd find its thematic and stylistic echoes in my own stories".

In the early 1970s, Chughtai wrote two novels, Ajeeb Aadmi (A Very Strange Man) and Jangli Kabootar (Wild Pigeons) that made use of her knowledge of the Hindi film industry, which she had been a part of for the last couple of decades. Jangli Kabootar, which was first published in 1970, follows the life of an actress and was partially inspired from a real-life incident that had occurred at the time. Chughtai's grandson, filmmaker Aijaz Khan had expressed his interest in a making a feature film based on story in a 2015 interview with the Mumbai Mirror: "would like to make one of her stories, Jangli Kabootar [as the story has] always fascinated me."

Ajeeb Aadmi similarly narrates the life of Dharam Dev, a popular leading man in Bollywood and the impact that his extra-marital affair with Zareen Jamal, a fellow actress has on the lives of the people involved. The novel was said to have been based on the affair between frequent co-stars Guru Dutt and Waheeda Rehman; Dutt was married to playback singer Geeta Dutt and the couple had three children at the time. While there are several allusions to real-life figures including Meena Kumari, Lata Mangeshkar, and Mohammed Rafi, members of the Dutt family and Rehman are never explicitly named. Chughtai said of Ajeeb Aadmi: "[In the novel], I go into [...] why girls run after him and producers like him, and the hell they make for these men and for their wives. The novel, which was released in the early 1970s, was praised for its bold nature and candour."

Mumbai-based writer and journalist, Jerry Pinto noted the impact of Ajeeb Aadmi's initial release saying, "There hadn't been a more dramatic and candid account of the tangled emotional lives of Bollywood before this." Writing for the Khaleej Times in 2019, Khalid Mohamed echoed the sentiment. He called the book a first of a kind tell-all book about the Hindi film industry, one that was "an eye-opener even for the know-alls of Bollywood". Mohamed also made a detailed note of Chughtai's candid style of writing, saying that she had an "instinctive gift for relating stories frankly and fearlessly".

=== Later years, critical reappraisals and subsequent acclaim (1990s and beyond) ===
Chughtai was diagnosed with Alzheimer's disease in the late 1980s, which limited her work thereafter. She died at her house in Mumbai on 24 October 1991, following the prolonged illness. Chughtai was known to have been averse of getting a burial, the common funeral practice in Islam. Rakhshanda Jalil quotes one of Chughtai's conversations with Qurratulain Hyder, a friend and contemporary writer in An Uncivil Woman: Writings on Ismat Chughtai, "I am very scared of the grave. They bury you beneath a pile of mud. One would suffocate [...] I'd rather be cremated." As per most accounts, Chughtai was cremated at the Chandanwadi crematorium, in accordance with her last wishes.

Following the translation of numerous of her works into English, a renewed interest in the Urdu literature of the twentieth century, and subsequent critical reappraisals, Chughtai's status as a writer rose. (Note: Sources.) Critical reappraisals for her works began with rereadings of Lihaaf, which in the intervening years has attached a greater significance; it was noted for its portrayal of the insulated life of a neglected wife in the feudal society and became a landmark for its early depiction of sex, still a taboo in modern Indian literature. Lihaaf has since been widely anthologised and has become one of Chughtai's most appreciated works.

With more of her work being made available for reading to a wider audience over the years, criticism centered around the limited scope of Chughtai's writing has also subsided. In a 1993 retrospective piece, Naqvi also countered the perceived scope of Chughtai's writings, saying that her work was "neither confined to nor exhausted" by the themes central to Lihaaf: "she had much, much more to offer". She separately cited the example of Jangli Kabootar, which was one of the first novels in Chughtai's cannon to explore the theme of infidelity. Naqvi highlighted how despite having established herself as a significant voice in Urdu literature by this time, Chughtai still remained keen on probing new themes and expand the scope of her work.

Tedhi Lakeer, which has come to be regarded as Chughtai's magnum opus is now considered to be one of the most significant works of Urdu literature by commentators and various media outlets. Critic and dramatist Shamim Hanfi gives it highest praise, saying that the novel, its first half in particular, matches up to the highest standards of world literature. Hussein comparably calls it one of the best novels of Urdu language and notes that Chughtai combines all her literary influences and her own lived experiences to create a radical text. He likened the novel's framework to that of a bildungsroman and praised its examination of the nationalist and feminist issues of the period. Commentators have also compared Chughtai's writing style in the novel to that of French writer and intellectual Simone de Beauvoir, based on the duo's existentialist and humanist affiliations.

== Influences and writing style ==
Chughtai was a liberal Muslim whose daughter, nephew, and niece were married to Hindus. In her own words, Chughtai came from a family of "Hindus, Muslims and Christians who all live peacefully". She said she read not only the Qur’an, but also the Gita and the Bible with openness.

Chughtai's short stories reflected the cultural legacy of the region in which she lived. This was well demonstrated in her story "Sacred Duty", where she dealt with social pressures in India, alluding to specific national, religious and cultural traditions.

In Chughtai's formative years, Nazar Sajjad Hyder had established herself an independent feminist voice, and the short stories of two very different women, Hijab Imtiaz Ali and Rashid Jehan, were also a significant early influence.

Many of her writings, including Angarey and Lihaaf, were banned in South Asia because their reformist and feminist content offended conservatives (for example, her view that the Niqab, the veil worn by women in Muslim societies, should be discouraged for Muslim women because it is oppressive and feudal).

== In popular culture ==
- In the 2018 biopic of Saadat Hasan Manto titled, Manto, her character is portrayed by Rajshri Deshpande.
- A 2019 Indian Hindi-language period drama film, Lihaaf: The Quilt is based on the story and stars Anushka Sen, Tannishtha Chatterjee, Mir Sarwar, Sonal Sehgal, Shoib Nikash Shah, Namita Lal, and Virendra Saxena. It was directed by Rahat Kazmi.

=== Publications on Ismat Chughtai ===
- Ismat: Her Life, Her Times. Sukrita Paul Kumar, Katha, New Delhi, 2000. ISBN 81-85586-97-7.
- Ismat Chughtai, A Fearless Voice. Manjulaa Negi, Rupa and Co, 2003.81-29101-53-X.
- "Torchbearer of a literary revolution". The Hindu, Sunday, 21 May 2000.
- Kashmir Uzma Urdu weekly, Srinagar, 27 December 2004, 2 January 2005.
- "Ismat Chughtai – Pakistan-India (1915–1991)", World People, 5 May 2006.
- Eyad N. Al-Samman, "Ismat Chughtai: An Iconoclast Muslim Dame of Urdu Fiction", Yemen Times, 13 April 2009

== Tribute ==
On 21 August 2018, Google celebrated her 107th birthday with a Google Doodle.

== Filmography ==
Film
Year	Title	Role	Notes
1948	Shikayat	–	Dialogue writer
1948	Ziddi	–	
1950	Arzoo	–	
1951	Buzdil	–	
1952	Sheesha	–	
1953	Fareb	–	Also co-director
1954	Darwaza	–	
1955	Society	–	
1958	Sone Ki Chidiya	–	Also producer
1958	Lala Rukh	–	Also co-director and producer
1966	Baharen Phir Bhi Ayengi	–	
1973	Garam Hawa	–	Filmfare Best Story Award (shared with Kaifi Azmi)
1978	Junoon	Miriam Labadoor	Cameo appearance

== Awards and honours ==
Year	Work	Award	Category	Result	Ref.
1974	Terhi Lakeer	Ghalib Award	Best Urdu Drama	Won	
1974–75	Garam Hawa	National Film Awards	Best Story	Won	
1974–75	Garam Hawa	Filmfare Award	Best Story	Won	
1974–75	–	Government of India State Award	–	Won	
1976	–	Indian civilian awards	Padma Shri	Won	
1979	–	Andhra Pradesh Urdu Akademi Award	Makhdoom Literary Award	Won	
1982	–	Soviet Land Nehru Award	–	Won	
1990	–	Rajasthan Urdu Akademi	Iqbal Samman	Won	

== See also ==
- List of Indian writers
