= Darwaza (1954 film) =

- Directed by: Shaheed Latif
- Produced by: Shaheed Latif; Ismat Chugtai
- Starring: Shekhar; Shyama
- Release date: 1954
- Country: India
- Language: Hindi

Darwaza is a 1954 Indian Hindi-language film directed by Shaheed Latif, and co-produced by Latif and Ismat Chugtai. The film stars Shekhar and Shyama. In a Times of India review (7 November 1954), Darwaza was described as a "good picture with progressive social slant".
