= Gopinath (film) =

1948 film by Mahesh Kaul

- Directed by: Mahesh Kaul
- Written by: Mahesh Kaul
- Produced by: Mahesh Kaul and Brij Kishore Agrawal
- Starring: Raj Kapoor, Tripti Mitra, Latika
- Cinematography: Chandu
- Edited by: Shrikhande
- Music by: Ninu Mazumdar
- Release date: 17 May 1948
- Running time: 141 min
- Country: India
- Language: Hindi

Gopinath is a 1948 Bollywood film, written, produced and directed by Mahesh Kaul. It stars Raj Kapoor, Tripti Mitra, Latika, Mahesh Kaul and Baby Zubeida. The music was composed by Ninu Muzumdar, with lyrics by Surdas, Meerabai and Ram Moorti.

== Plot ==
The story is about Mohan (Raj Kapoor), who wants to write stories for films. His mother (Anwaribai), a heart patient, would like to see him married to Gopi (Tripti Mitra), a friend's daughter staying with them. Gopi has come from the town of Raipur in Chhattisgarh to Bombay with her brother, who's going to Africa for a job. On Mohan's mother's request and at Gopi's insistence, the brother departs without her. Gopi has been in love with Mohan from their childhood days in the town. Mohan is not interested in her and instead gets involved with Neela Devi (Latika), a famous film star. Gopi's one-sided devotion to Mohan drives her to madness, where she sees him everywhere. Mohan returns disenchanted by Neela.

== Cast ==
- Raj Kapoor as Mohan
- Tripti Mitra as Gopi
- Latika as Neela Devi
- Anwari as Mohan's mother
- Nandkishore
- Randhir
- Ghosh
- Shivaji Rathore
- Mahesh Kaul as Mahesh Kaul
- Baby Zubeida as Bindu
- Niranjan Tiwari

== Soundtrack ==
#	Title	Singer(s)	Lyricist
1	"Aayi Gori Radhika"	Meena Kapoor, Neenu Majumdar	Surdas
2	"Baali Umar Piya Mor"	Shamshad Begum	
3	"Main Birhan Baithi Jaagoon"	Meena Kapoor	Meerabai
4	"Aayi Saawan Ki Rut"	Shamshad Begum	
5	"Sakhi Mohe Neend Na Aaye"	Meena Kapoor	Meerabai
6	"Bahutero Samjhaya"	Shamshad Begum	
7	"Chale Gaye Dil Ke"	Meena Kapoor	Surdas
8	"Kaare Baadar Baras"	Ninu Muzumdar	
9	"Bansari Bajai Aaj"	Meena Kapoor	
