= Sautela Bhai (1962 film) =

- Directed by: Mahesh Kaul
- Starring: Guru Dutt; Raaj Kumar; Bipin Gupta
- Music by: Anil Biswas
- Release date: 1962
- Country: India
- Language: Hindi

Sautela Bhai is a 1962 Indian Hindi-language film directed by Mahesh Kaul. Its music was composed by Anil Biswas. The lead cast includes Guru Dutt, Raaj Kumar and Bipin Gupta.

A family melodrama set in Bengal, Sautela Bhai was described in a Times of India review as a "moderately interesting picture".

At the 26th Annual BFJA Awards (1963), it was named the seventh-best Indian film released in 1962. At the 10th National Film Awards (1963), the film won the All India Certificate of Merit for the Third Best Feature Film.

== Plot ==
Set in Bengal, the film follows Baikunth Majumdar (Bipin Gupta), a widower who remarries after having a son, Gokul. His new wife, Bhawani, treats Gokul as her own while raising him alongside her younger son, Vinod. The brothers eventually take different paths: Vinod (Raaj Kumar) leaves home for his education, while Gokul (Guru Dutt) remains in Bengal and takes responsibility for the family business.

Life in the city changes Vinod, and his increasingly wayward behaviour leads his parents to favour Gokul when deciding the future of the family estate. After returning home, Vinod refuses to accept the arrangement and challenges his brother over the inheritance. The resulting dispute threatens to divide the household, but Gokul's guileless and almost childlike nature eventually helps reconcile the brothers and restore harmony within the family.

== Cast ==
- Guru Dutt as Gokul
- Pronoti Bhattacharya
- Bipin Gupta as Baikunth Majmdar
- Raaj Kumar as Vinod
- Ranibala
- Asit Sen
- Bela Bose
- Radheshyam
- Samar Chatterjee
- Ratna
- Kanhaiyalal
- Lakshman Singh
