= Chandni Chowk (film) =

- Directed by: B. R. Chopra
- Written by: D. P. Berry
- Produced by: Prince Hira Sinh of Baria; Goverdhandas Aggarwal
- Starring: Meena Kumari; Shekhar
- Cinematography: Keki Mistry
- Edited by: Pran Mehra
- Music by: Roshan
- Production company: Hira Films
- Release date: 1954
- Running time: 129 minutes
- Country: India
- Language: Hindi

Chandni Chowk is a 1954 classic Muslim social drama film directed by B. R. Chopra.

The music was composed by Roshan with lyrics written by Majrooh Sultanpuri, Saifuddin Saif, Kamil Rashid, Shailendra and Raja Mehdi Ali Khan.

Story was by D. P. Berry with screenplay by I. S. Johar and dialogue written by Kamil Rashid. Produced by Prince Hira Sinh of Baria and Goverdhandas Aggarwal under the banner of Hira Films. The director of photography was Keki Mistry. The film starred Meena Kumari, Shekhar, Jeevan, Agha, Achala Sachdev and Smriti Biswas.

The main hero Shekhar was one of the less appreciated lead actors of the 1940s and 1950s but has been cited as a "master of realistic portrayals" usually cast in "mid-budget films".

The story involves a Nawab belonging to the Chandni Chowk area of Delhi in the early 1920s, who gets "tricked into marrying his daughter to the gardener's son". In October 2015, Deepa Gahlot mentioned the film in her book 50 Films that Deserve a New Audience.

== Plot ==
The film is set in the early 1920s in the Chandni Chowk area of Delhi. Nawab Safdarjung (Kumar) has a young daughter Zarina (Meena Kumari), whom he's keen to get married off. One of the applicants for her hand in marriage is the young Nawab Akbar (Shekhar) of Lucknow. After the wedding takes place, Nawab Safdarjung is informed by Ibrahim Beg (Jeevan) that Akbar is, in fact, the gardener's son. The plot to introduce Akbar as a Nawab was conceived by Ibrahim to teach the arrogant Nawab a lesson when he refused his newly rich neighbour, Yusuf's (Agha) proposal to marry Zarina, by haughtily declining it for him being a mere vegetable vendor. Angry on learning about the subterfuge, the Nawab calls off the marriage. Zarina however, decides to go to her in-laws' house as she now considers Akbar her husband. Akbar leaves for Egypt in the hope of earning money. He finds a job there and soon gets entangled with a dancer Noorie (Smriti Biswas), who falls in love with him. Noorie creates grave misunderstandings in Zarina's life when she reads Zarina's letter to Akbar. She sends off a wire informing the in-laws that Akbar is dead. Finally, Noorie dies telling Akbar about the misunderstanding created, and Akbar returns home to his bride.

== Cast ==
- Meena Kumari as Zarina
- Shekhar as Akbar
- Jeevan as Ibrahim
- Agha as Yusuf
- Sunder as Kallan
- Kumar as Nawab Safdar Jung
- Yashodra Kathju as Shabnam
- Tun Tun
- Smriti Biswas as Noorie
- Pratima Devi as Akbar's mother
- Achala Sachdev as Begum
- Krishna Kumari as Laila
- Ramma Sharma as Suraiya
- Kammo as Dancer
- Srinath as Arif
- Abbas Ajmeri as Zaman Khan
- Manmohan Krishna as Mirza
- Naaz as Young Zarina
- Romi as Young Akbar

== Box office ==
B. R. Chopra had shifted to Bombay from Lahore, where he edited the Cine-Herald. In Bombay, Chopra joined Shri Gopal Pictures as a producer. Chopra's first film as a director, Afsana (1951) was a big hit running for over twenty-five weeks (silver-jubilee). Chandni Chowk, Chopra's third directorial venture was also a big success at the box office, which gave him the impetus to start his own film company B. R. Films in 1956.

== Soundtrack ==
The film's music director was Roshan, who went on to compose music for films such as Barsat Ki Rat (1960) and Taj Mahal (1963), winning the Filmfare Award for Best Music Director for the latter film. With lyrics by Majrooh Sultanpuri, Kamil Rashid, Shailendra, Raja Mehdi Ali Khan and Saifuddin Saif. The film's credits however, name only Majrooh Sultanpuri, Shailendra and Raja Mehdi Ali Khan as the lyricists. The playback singing was provided by Lata Mangeshkar, Mohammed Rafi, Asha Bhosle, Mukesh, Shamshad Begum and Usha Mangeshkar.

=== Song list ===
Song	Singer
"Hamen Ae Dil Kahin Le Chal"	Mukesh
"Zameen Bhi Wohi Hai Wohi Aasmaan"	Mohammed Rafi
"Bahak Chale Mere Nainwa"	Lata Mangeshkar
"Jadu Bura Bangal Ka"	Lata Mangeshkar
"Chhupa Sakoon Na"	Lata Mangeshkar
"Aa Jaye Janewale"	Lata Mangeshkar
"Tera Dil Kahan Hai"	Asha Bhosle
"Jitne Bhi Gham Hain"	Asha Bhosle
"Har Baat Poochhiye Yeh Haqeeqat Na Poochhiye, Humko Kisise Kyun Hai Mohabbat Na Poochhiye"	Lata Mangeshkar, Asha Bhosle, Shamshad Begum
"Qutub Minar Pe Chadhkar"	Shamshad Begum
"Ae Khuda Majboor Ki Fariyad"	Mubarak Begum
