= Hamara Ghar (1950 film) =

- Directed by: Nanubhai Bhatt
- Produced by: Kishore Sahu
- Starring: Meena Kumari; Durga Khote; Umakant Veera; Agha; David
- Music by: Chitragupta Shrivastava
- Production company: Hindustan Chitra
- Release date: 1950
- Country: India
- Language: Hindi

Hamara Ghar (Our Home) is a 1950 Hindi family drama film made by 'Hindustan Chitra' and directed by Nanabhai Bhatt (father of Mahesh and Mukesh Bhatt). Music is by Chitragupta Shrivastava. The cast was Durga Khote, Umakant Desai, Veera, Agha, Meena Kumari, Geeta Bose, David, Jankidas, Ramesh Gupta etc. Lyrics were by Anjum, Rammurthy Chaturvedi and Bharat Vyas.

== Storyline ==
The story is of a family consisting of a mother and her five sons. A relative causes discord. The mother argues they need to stay united like the walls of a room to avoid collapse.

== Cast ==
- Durga Khote
- Umakant Desai,
- Veera
- Agha
- Meena Kumari
- Geeta Bose
- David
- Jankidas
- Ramesh Gupta

== Soundtrack ==
Track #	Song	Singer(s)	Lyrics	Composer
1	"Kaha Chale Sarkar"	Kishore Kumar, Shamshad Begum	Rammurti Chaturvedi	Chitragupta Shrivastava
2	"Chandni Chitki Hui Hai Muskurati Raat Hai"	Geeta Dutt, Mohammed Rafi	Anjum	Chitragupt
3	"Chori Chori Mat Dekh Balam"	Mohammed Rafi, Shamshad Begum	Bharat Vyas	Chitragupt
4	"Rang Bhari Holi Aayi"	Mohammed Rafi, Shamshad Begum	Bharat Vyas	Chitragupt
5	"Teri Tirchi Nazar Teri Patli Kamar"	Mohammed Rafi, Shamshad Begum	Bharat Vyas	Chitragupt
6	"Chupke Chupke Dil Me Aane Wale"	Mohammed Rafi, Geeta Dutt	Rammurti Chaturvedi	Chitragupt
7	"Lakdi Jal Koyla Baye"	Shanti Sharma, Shamshad Begum, Geeta Dutt	Anjum	Chitragupt
