= Sheesha (1952 film) =

- Directed by: Shaheed Latif
- Written by: Ismat Chugtai (story & dialogues)
- Produced by: Umar Ansari
- Starring: Nargis; Sajjan
- Cinematography: S. Srivastava
- Music by: Ghulam Mohammed
- Production company: Asian Pictures
- Release date: 1952
- Country: India
- Language: Hindi

Sheesha is a 1952 Hindi-language film directed by Shaheed Latif. It was produced under the banner of Asian Pictures and starred Nargis and Sajjan.

Sheesha premiered in Bombay on 15 August 1952. It was reviewed by The Times of India on 24 August, under the title "Sheesha – Poor Picture Sans Point Or Purpose!".
