= Chamkee =

- Directed by: J. K. Nanda
- Starring: Ragini; Shekhar; Roopmala
- Music by: Manna Dey
- Release date: 1952
- Country: India
- Language: Hindi

Chamkee is a 1952 Indian Hindi-language film directed by J. K. Nanda. It stars Ragini, Shekhar, and Roopmala; and features a soundtrack composed by Manna Dey. Described as a story of mistaken identity, the film features Shekhar in a dual role with contrasting personalities.

== Cast ==
- Ragini
- Shekhar
- Roopmala
- Jeevan
- Ulhas
- Murad
- Meera Misra
- Cuckoo Moray
- Nana Palshikar
- Mumtaz Ali
- Shashikala

== Release ==
Chamkee premiered at Liberty Theatre, Bombay, on 8 February 1952.

== Reception ==
A contemporary review by filmindia's Baburao Patel was critical of the plot and direction, but praised the performances of Shekhar and Roopmala.

The Times of India reported that the film's music proved to be popular with audiences.
