= Ek Saal =

1957 film directed by Devendra Goel

- Theatrical release poster
- Directed by: Devendra Goel
- Written by: S. K. Prabhakar
- Screenplay by: S. K. Prabhakar
- Story by: I. S. Johar
- Produced by: Devendra Goel
- Starring: Ashok Kumar; Madhubala; Johnny Walker
- Cinematography: Shankar A. Palav
- Edited by: R. V. Shrikhande
- Music by: Ravi
- Production company: Goel Productions
- Distributed by: Goel Productions
- Release date: 20 December 1957
- Running time: 134 min.
- Country: India
- Language: Hindi

Ek Saal (transl. "A Year") is a 1957 Indian romantic drama film directed by Devendra Goel and starring Ashok Kumar and Madhubala in lead roles. The film is about a father of a dying girl who hires a conman to make his dying daughter's last year a happier one.

A critical and commercial success, Ek Saal was among the several box-office hits Madhubala starred in between 1958 and 1962.

== Plot ==
Bombay-based Usha Sinha (Madhubala) lives a wealthy lifestyle with her widowed dad, a retired Colonel. During her birthday celebrations at her grandmother (Pratima Devi)'s house in Lucknow, she encounters a flirt, but avoids him, only to run into him again in a taxi-cab, and then in her very own house in Bombay. She finds out that his name is Suresh (Ashok Kumar), who has been hired by her dad as a Manager. Eventually both she and Suresh fall in love with each other. Suresh appears to care a lot about Usha and even takes her to a doctor for a medical check-up to ensure her well-being, to which she agrees, without knowing that she has brain tumor and is not expected to live more than one year. What the Usha do not know is that Suresh does not love her at alI, for his true love is a Lucknow-based woman named Rajani (Kuldip Kaur), and he is merely here to win their trust, so that he can be successful in robbing them of all their cash and valuables.

== Cast ==
- Ashok Kumar as Suresh Kumar
- Madhubala as Usha Sinha
- Kuldip Kaur as Rajini
- Johnny Walker as J.B. Pinto
- Minoo Mumtaz as Mary
- Mehmood as Doctor Mahesh Kapoor
- Madan Puri as Dr. M.M. Puri

== Soundtrack ==
The soundtrack of Ek Saal was composed by Ravi and lyrics were penned by Prem Dhawan and Ravi himself.

Song	Singer	Lyricist
"Yeh Waqt Ja Raha Hai"	Mohammed Rafi	Prem Dhawan
"Dil To Kisi Ko Doge"	Mohammed Rafi	Prem Dhawan
"Sab Kuch Loota Ke"	Talat Mahmood	Prem Dhawan
"Sab Kuch Loota Ke"	Lata Mangeshkar	Prem Dhawan
"Chham Chham Chali"	Lata Mangeshkar	Prem Dhawan
"Chale Bhi Aao"	Lata Mangeshkar	Prem Dhawan
"Tu Jiye Hazaron Saal"	Asha Bhosle	Prem Dhawan
"Miyan Mera Bada Beimaan"	Geeta Dutt, S. Balbir	Prem Dhawan
"Ulajh Gaye Do Naina Dekho"	Lata Mangeshkar, Hemant Kumar	Ravi

== Release ==
=== Critical reception ===
V. P. Sathe of Swarajya magazine praised Goel's direction and Ashok Kumar's performance, described as "slick and polished", while Madhubala "looks charming throughout".

A retrospective review on the website Filmi Geek stated, "There is lots and lots of pretty to enjoy [in the film]". It praised Madhubala for playing a brain tumor patient: "Madhubala is utterly radiant [...], she does play a marvelous ingenue, and she's simply lovely".

=== Box office ===
Ek Saal was a commercial success.
