= Shaheed Latif =

Indian film director (1913–1967)

Shaheed Lateef
- Born: 11 June 1913; Chandausi, United Provinces of Agra and Oudh, British Raj
- Died: 16 April 1967 (aged 53)
- Occupations: film director, screenwriter, film producer
- Years active: 1941–1967
- Spouse: Ismat Chughtai

Shaheed Lateef (11 June 1913 – 16 April 1967) was an Indian Hindi film director, writer, and producer. He was the maker of films like Ziddi (1948) which launched Dev Anand's career and Arzoo (1950) starring Dilip Kumar and Kamini Kaushal.

== Early life and background ==
Shaheed Lateef befriended Saadat Hasan Manto, but also Ismat Chughtai (1915–1991). Lateef and Chughtai married in 1941, and later had two daughters.

== Career ==
Lateef shifted to Bombay (now Mumbai) and started his career with Bombay Talkies, a noted film studio of Hindi film industry, where he wrote dialogues for Ashok Kumar-starrer, Naya Sansar (1941), followed by Amiya Chakravarty's Anjaan (1941) and Gyan Mukherjee's Jhoola (1941). This led to his directorial debut with Ziddi (1948), on a story by Ismat Chughtai. The film also established the career of actor Dev Anand. The husband wife duo worked together on many films, where Ismat was sometimes a scenarist, a writer or at times even producer.

He died in Mumbai, Maharashtra on 16 April 1967.

== Filmography ==
- Jawab Ayega (1968) - Director
- Baharen Phir Bhi Aayengi (1966) - Director
- Picnic (1966) - Director
- Sone Ki Chidiya (1958) - Director
- Society (1955) - Director
- Darwaza (1954) - Director
- Fareb (1953) - Director
- Sheesha (1952) - Director
- Buzdil (1951) - Director
- Arzoo (1950) - Director
- Shikayat (1948) - Director
- Ziddi (1948) - Director
- Anjaan (1941) - Dialogue
- Jhoola (1941) - Screenwriter, Dialogue
- Naya Sansar (1941) - Dialogue
