= Aankhen (1950 film) =

1950 Indian film

- Directed by: Devendra Goel
- Starring: Bharat Bhushan; Nalini Jaywant; Shekhar
- Music by: Madan Mohan
- Production company: Goel Cine Corporation
- Release date: 1950
- Country: India
- Language: Hindi

Aankhen (meaning The Eyes) is a 1950 Bollywood family drama film directed by Devendra Goel and starring Bharat Bhushan, Nalini Jaywant and Shekhar in lead roles. A moderate box office success, the film became the tenth highest earning Indian film of 1950, earning an approximate gross of Rs. 72,00,000 and a net of Rs. 40,00,000.

== Cast ==
- Bharat Bhushan
- Nalini Jaywant
- Shekhar
- Cuckoo
- Yakub
- Bhudo Advani
- Yashodra Katju
- Anwari

== Music ==
1. "Hum Ishq Mein Barbaad" by Mohammed Rafi
2. "Humse Nain Milana" by Mukesh and Shamshad Begum
3. "Humse Na Dil Ko Lagana" by Shamshad Begum and Madan Mohan
4. "Rail Mein Jiya Mora" by Raj Khosla
5. "Preet Laga Ke Maine" by Mukesh
6. "Milne Ki Tamanna Jin Se Thi" by Shamshad Begum
7. "Mohabbat Karne Walon Ka" by Shamshad Begum
8. "Meri Atariya Pe Kaga" by Meena Kapoor
