= Musafir (1957 film) =

- Poster
- Directed by: Hrishikesh Mukherjee
- Written by: Story: Hrishikesh Mukherjee; Dialogues: Rajinder Singh Bedi
- Screenplay by: Ritwik Ghatak; Hrishikesh Mukherjee
- Produced by: Hrishikesh Mukherjee
- Starring: Dilip Kumar; Kishore Kumar; Shekhar; Suchitra Sen; Usha Kiran; Nirupa Roy
- Narrated by: Balraj Sahni
- Cinematography: Kamal Bose
- Edited by: Das Dhaimade
- Music by: Salil Chowdhury
- Production company: Film Group
- Distributed by: Film Group
- Release date: 26 April 1957
- Country: India
- Language: Hindi

Musafir (lit. 'Traveller') is a 1957 Hindi film directed by Hrishikesh Mukherjee, being his directorial debut. The screenplay and story were written by Hrishikesh Mukherjee and Ritwik Ghatak respectively. The film is about a house and the lives of three families who live in it, so in essence, it is three stories linked by the house. The first part stars Suchitra Sen, Shekhar in the lead role; The second part stars Kishore Kumar, Nirupa Roy, in the lead roles; The third part stars Dilip Kumar, Usha Kiran in the lead roles. The film also marked the debut of Keshto Mukherjee in Hindi Cinema, who appeared in a brief role of a street dancer. Dilip Kumar also made his singing venture with this film, a duet with Lata Mangeshkar. The film was experimental in nature, its genre being a predecessor of what eventually became anthology film in the years to come.

== Plot ==
=== Episode 1 – Marriage ===
Shakuntala (Suchitra Sen) and her husband Ajay (Shekhar) elope and move into a new house together. The landlord Mahadev Chaudhary (David) helps the couple move to the rented house, which is the main protagonist of the film. While Shakuntala makes the house into a beautiful home, her husband gets busy with work. She meets the neighbouring tea vendor (Mohan Choti) and meets the next door "aunty", whose favourite pastime is to gossip about developments in others' homes. The couple hears the sound of a violin in the night and asks the tea-stall owner about it in the morning. He says that it is being played by a madman, Pagla Babu. Since the couple had eloped, Shakuntala wants her parents-in-law to accept her as their daughter-in-law. They somehow find the young couple and are more than happy to meet Shakuntala, accepting her into the family. Finally, Shakuntala and her husband go with them and vacate the house. In between, Shakuntala plants some seeds in the garden.

The landlord again puts the TO LET sign on the house.

=== Episode 2 – Birth ===
The house's next tenants are a family headed by an old man, Madhav (Nazir Hussain). The other members are his elder widowed daughter-in-law (Nirupa Roy) and younger college-going son Bhanu (Kishore Kumar). The daughter-in-law is pregnant, but her husband has just died. Bhanu is finishing college and simultaneously looking for a job, while his old father manages the expenses. Although there is sadness in the home, Bhanu, with his wit and humour, maintains a light atmosphere for his sister-in-law. The next door "aunty" again comes and chats on and on. Bhanu also hears the violin, and when he asks about it from the tea-vendor, he is told about Pagla Babu. The problems of the family increase as Bhanu fails to get a job, landing the family in dire consequences. He gets frustrated; this leads to a clash with his father. On feeling humiliated, Bhanu finally drinks poison before sleeping. However, the poison is adulterated. Bhanu wakes up to the entire family mourning. He gets the news that he has finally got a job in another city. The pregnant woman also delivers a child. The family is happy and they move to another city, vacating the house. The seed which Shakuntala sowed has germinated.

The landlord again puts the TO LET sign on the house.

Note: This part of the movie features a song by Kishore Kumar, "Munna Bada Pyara, Ammi Ka Dulara".

=== Episode 3 – Death ===
The next inhabitants are a barrister and his widowed sister Uma (Usha Kiran). Uma has a small handicapped son, Raja (Daisy Irani). The neighbourhood "aunty" again visits the home. Like the previous tenants, this family also hears the sound of a violin in the night. The child is also attracted by the music and when he finds out about Pagla Babu from the tea-vendor, he insists on meeting him. However, the vendor tells the child that Pagla Babu does not meet anyone. However, the child does not listen and insists on meeting the mysterious violinist. Pagla Babu does appear to meet the child. Uma is shocked to realize that Pagla Babu is none other than Raja (Dilip Kumar), her ex-lover. Raja, however, does not make it evident and interacts fondly with the child. In a very short span, an amazing bond is developed between Raja and the child. Initially, Uma is very uncomfortable with this bonding, but slowly she accepts it. Raja is suffering from cancer and the disease is in its advanced stages. Ironically, Raja, who is on the verge of dying, pumps life into the child and fills his dark world with hope. He also tells the child that he will start walking once there is a flower in the garden. On knowing about Raja, Uma's brother is furious. There is a clash between them. Slowly, Raja reaches the final stage and Uma takes care of him. Eventually he dies and the child starts walking. Meanwhile, in the garden, the germinated seed finally blossoms into a flower.

== Cast ==
- Dilip Kumar as Raja
- Kishore Kumar as Bhanu
- Shakhar as Ajay Sharma
- Suchitra Sen as Shakuntala Verma
- Usha Kiran as Uma
- Nirupa Roy as Bhanu's Sister-In-Law
- Daisy Irani as Raja
- Naaz as Munni
- Mohan Choti as Mohan Choti
- David as Mahadev Chaudhary
- Nazir Hussain as Madhav
- Bipin Gupta as Neelambar Sharma
- Durga Khote as Mrs. Sharma
- Rashid Khan as Doctor
- Rajlaxmi as Munni's Mother
- Paul Mahindra as Advocate Suresh Chandra
- Shailendra as Street Musician
- Heera Sawant as Street Dancer
- Keshto Mukherjee as Street Dancer
- Balraj Sahni as the off-screen background narrator

== Music ==
All lyrics are written by Shailendra; all music is composed by Salil Chowdhury.

Song	Singer
"Man Re, Hari Ke Gun Ga"	Lata Mangeshkar
"Ek Aaye Ek Jaye Musafir"	Shyamal Mitra
"Munna Bada Pyara"	Kishore Kumar
"Tedhi Tedhi Humse Phire Sari Duniya"	Manna Dey, Shamshad Begum
"Laagi Nahin Chhute Rama, Chahe Jiya Jaye"	Lata Mangeshkar, Dilip Kumar

== Awards ==
- National Film Awards
  - 1957 - Certificate of Merit for Third Best Feature Film in Hindi
