= Masoom (1941 film) =

- Starring: Mazhar Khan
- Release date: 1941
- Country: India
- Language: Hindi

Masoom is a Bollywood film. It was released in 1941.
