= Chitragupt (composer) =

Indian film composer (1917–1991)

- Chitragupt, c. 1969
- Born: Chitragupta Shrivastava; 16 November 1917
- Died: 14 January 1991 (aged 73)
- Occupation: Music director
- Years active: 1946 – 1991
- Children: Anand–Milind (Anand Shrivastava and Milind Shrivastava)

Chitragupt Shrivastava (16 November 1917 – 14 January 1991), better known as Chitragupt, was an Indian film music director in Hindi cinema and Bhojpuri cinema.

== Personal life ==
Chitragupt Shrivastava was born on 16 November 1917 in Sawreji, a village located in Gopalganj district in the Indian state of Bihar (now in Gopalganj district) into a Kayastha family. His sons, Anand and Milind Shrivastava, are also Bollywood music directors.

== Career ==
He mostly worked with lyricist Majrooh Sultanpuri.

Also the duet "Machalti Hui Hawa Mein Chham Chham" sung by Kishore Kumar and Lata Mangeshkar from "Ganga Ki Lahrein" was a hit. According to Raju Bharatan, Lata Mangeshkar sang “240 songs (no fewer than 151 solos)” conmposed by Chitragupt. He made Kishore Kumar sing the semi-classical song "Payalwaali Dekh Na" and the popular song "Agar Sun Le Koi Nagma".

== Filmography ==
- Fighting Hero (1946)
- Toofan Queen (1946)
- Lady Robinhood (1946)
- Jadui Ratan (1947)
- Shake Hand (1947)
- Stunt Queen (1947)
- Mala The Mighty (1948)
- Jai Hind (1948)
- 11 O'Clock (1948)
- Tigress (1948)
- Joker (1949)
- Bhakt Pundalik (1949)
- Shaukeen (1949)
- Delhi Express (1949)
- Jodidaar (1950)
- Circuswaale (1950)
- Veer Babruvahan (1950)
- Hamara Ghar (1950)
- Hamaari Shaan (1951)
- Jeevan Taara (1951)
- Sindbad The Sailor (1952)
- Bhakt Puraan (1952)
- Tarang (1952)
- Naag Panchami (1953)
- Naya Raasta (1953)
- Manchala (1953)
- Miss Mala (1954)
- Sultanat (1954)
- Tulsidas (1954)
- Alibaba Aur Chaalis Chor (1954)
- Toote Khilone(1954)
- Navratri (1955)
- Shiv Bhakt (1955)
- Sati Madalasa (1955)
- Raj Kanya (1955)
- Raj Darbaar (1955)
- Shree Ganesh Vivaah (1955)
- Shrikrishna Bhakti (1955)
- Mahasati Savitri (1955)
- Kismat (1956)
- Basre Ki Hoor (1956)
- Basant Panchami (1956)
- Zindagi Ke Mele (1956)
- Jai Shree (1956)
- Insaaf (1956)
- Captain Kishore (1957)
- Talwar Ki Dhani (1957)
- Neelmani (1957)
- Bhabhi (1957)
- Laxmi Pooja (1957)
- Pawanputra Hanuman (1957)
- Sakshi Gopal (1957)
- Taxi Stand (1958)
- Daughter Of Sindbad (1958)
- Chaalbaaz (1958)
- Balyogi Upamanyu (1958)
- Maya Bazaar (1958)
- Teesri Gali (1958)
- Raj Singhasan (1958)
- Zimbo (1958)
- Kangan (1959)
- Madam X Y Z (1959)
- Daaka (1959)
- Commander (1959)
- Naya Sansaar (1959)
- Kaali Topi Laal Rumaal (1959)
- Kal Hamaara Hain (1959)
- Guest House (1959)
- Baazigar (1961)
- Barkha (1959)
- Chand Mere Aaja (1960)
- Maa Baap (1960)
- Baraat (1960)
- Gambler (1960)
- Patang (1960)
- Naache Naagin Baaje Been (1960)
- Police Detective (1960)
- Zimbo Comes To Town (1960)
- Tel Maalish Boot Polish (1961)
- Bade Ghar Ki Bahu (1961)
- Bada Aadmi (1961)
- Opera House (1961)
- Zabak (1961)
- Ramu Dada (1961)
- Suhaag Sindoor (1961)
- Aplam Chaplam (1962)
- Rocket Girl (1962)
- King Kong (1962)
- Main Chup Rahungi (1962)
- Shaadi (1962)
- Ankh Micholi (1962)
- Bezubaan (1962)
- Band Master (1963)
- Ganga Maiyya Tohe Piyari Chadhaibo (1962) (Bhojpuri Film)
- Main Shaadi Karne Chala (1962)
- Hum Matwaale Naujawan (1961)
- Burma Road (1962)
- Ghar Basaake Dekho (1963)
- Laagi Naahi Chhute Ram (1963)
- Mummy Daddy (1963)
- Kabuli Khan (1963)
- Aankh Michouli (1963)
- Ek Raaz (1963)
- Baaghi (1964)
- Ganga Ki Lahren (1964)
- Samson (1964)
- Mera Qasoor Kya Hain? (1964)
- Main Bhi Ladki Hoon (1964)
- Akashdeep (1965)
- Saat Samundar Paar (1965)
- Oonche Log (1965)
- Mahabharat (1965)
- Aadhi Raat Ke Baad (1965)
- Afsaana (1966)
- Biradari (1966)
- Toofan Mein Pyaar Kahan (1966)
- Vaasna (1967)
- Aulaad (1968)
- Maa (1968)
- Pyar Ka Sapna (1969)
- Nai Zindagi (1969)
- Bank Robbery (1969)
- Pardesi (1970)
- Sansaar (1971)
- Kabhi Dhoop Kabhi Chhaon (1971)
- Hamaara Adhikaar (1971)
- Prem Ki Ganga (1971)
- Saaz Aur Sanam (1972)
- Dost (1974) (Background Music)
- Intezaar (1973)
- Shikwa (1974)
- Balak Aur Janwar (1975)
- Rangeen Duniya (1975)
- Angaarey (1976)
- Sikka (1976)
- Jai Mahalaxmi Maa (1976)
- Toofan Aur Bijlee (1976)
- Gayatri Mahima (1977)
- Aladdin And The Wonderful Lamp (1978)
- The Adventures of Aladdin (1979)
- Do Shikaari (1978)
- Mahi Munda [Punjabi movie] (1979)
- Shiv Shakti (1980)
- Saiyan Tore Karan (1981)
- Jwala Dahej Ki (1982)
- Hamar Bhauji (1983)
- Chukti Bhar Senur (1983)
- Film Hi Film (1983)
- Ganga Kinare Mora Gaon (1984)
- Sant Ravidas Ki Amar Kahani (1984)
- Bhaiya Dooj 1984
- Ghar Dwaar (1985)
- Piya Ke Gaon (1985)
- Insaaf Ki Manzil (1988)
- Chandaal (1998)

== Songs ==
Songs composed by Chitragupt:

#	Title	Film and year	Singer(s)
1	Chal Ud Ja Re Panchhi	Bhabhi (1957)	Mohammed Rafi
2	Ek Raat Mein Do Do Chand Khile	Barkha (1960)	Lata Mangeshkar and Mukesh
3	Laagi Chhoote Na Ab To Sanam	Kali Topi Lal Rumal (1959)	Lata Mangeshkar and Mohammed Rafi
4	Teri Duniya Se Door Chale Hoke Majboor	Zabak (1961)	Lata Mangeshkar and Mohammed Rafi
5	Chand Jane Kahan Kho Gaya	Main Chup Rahungi (1962)	Lata Mangeshkar and Mohammed Rafi
6	Chhedo Na Meri Zulfen	Ganga Ki Lahren (1964)	Kishore Kumar and Lata Mangeshkar
7	Jaag Dil E Diwana	Oonche Log (1965)	Mohammed Rafi
8	Yeh Parbaton Ke Daayre	Vaasna (1968)	Lata Mangeshkar and Mohammed Rafi
9	Kabhi Doop Kabhi Chhaon	Kabhi Dhoop Kabhi Chhaon (1971)	Pradeep
10	Dekho Mausam Kya Bahar Hai	Opera House (1961)	Mukesh, Lata Mangeshkar
11	Mera Babu Chail Chabila Main to Nachungi	Ghar Dwaar (1985)	Runa Laila
12	Jaldi Jaldi Chala Re Kahara	Dharti Maiya (Bhojpuri film) (1981)	Mohammed Rafi
