= Naya Sansar =

- Directed by: N. R. Acharya
- Written by: Khwaja Ahmad Abbas (dialogue); J.S. Kashyap (dialogue); Shaheed Latif (dialogue)
- Screenplay by: Khwaja Ahmad Abbas; Gyan Mukherjee
- Story by: Khwaja Ahmad Abbas
- Produced by: Bombay Talkies
- Starring: Renuka Devi; Ashok Kumar; Mubarak
- Cinematography: R. D. Pareenja
- Music by: Saraswati Devi; Ramchandra Pal; Pradeep (lyrics)
- Release date: 1941
- Running time: 158 minutes
- Country: India
- Language: Hindustani

Naya Sansar ("New World") is a 1941 Indian Hindustani-language film on radical journalism, directed by reporter turned director, N. R. Acharya (1909–1993), and written by a journalist himself, Khwaja Ahmad Abbas, who started his film career with this film. It won him the Bengal Film Journalists' Association Award for the best story and screenplay.

It features dialogues by Shaheed Latif and J. S. Kashyap; and stars Renuka Devi (1918–1989) and Ashok Kumar in the lead roles.This film later inspired Khwaja Ahmad Abbas to name his production house as "Naya Sansar" Productions

== Overview ==
The film was written by Abbas, who was a film critic at that time. He used his journalistic background to create a story about the rising radicalism in Indian society and journalism. The story addressed the conflict between a dynamic young reporter and his cautious, yet idealistic, editor of the fictional progressive newspaper, 'Sansar'. The story line revolved around the editor, Premchand (Mubarak), who is in love with a beautiful orphan named Asha (Renuka Devi), whom his family has raised from an infant. Soon after Asha starts working for the paper, she falls in love with Sansar's star reporter and dedicated radical-journalist, Puran (Ashok Kumar). Asha, however, still feels indebted to Premchand's family.

When Premchand starts to hedge on his radicalism by dealing with the evil Dhaniram, Puran quits, and starts his own newspaper, "Naya Sansar". Premchand quickly sees the error of his ways, and not only returns to the paper's previous left-wing stance, but also condones the marriage of Asha and Puran.

== Cast ==
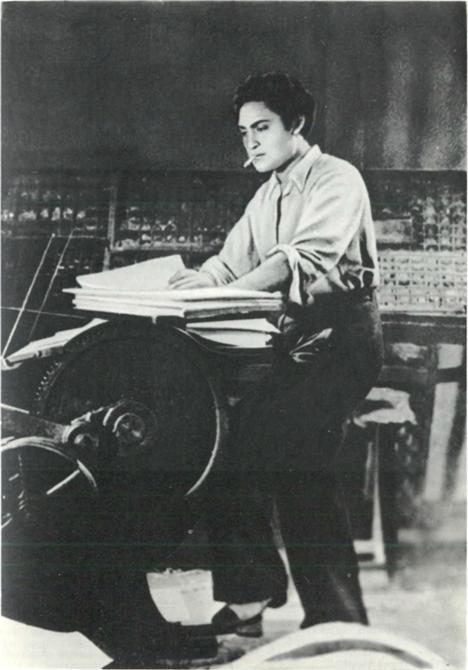
Ashok Kumar in Naya Sansar (1941)

Credits adapted from the film's pressbook:

- Renuka Devi as Asha
- Ashok Kumar as Puran
- Mubarak as Prem Chand
- Shahnawaz as Shamsher Singh
- V. H. Desai as Chacha
- Jagannath as Dhaniram
- David as Mr. Sharma
- Suresh as Bhola
- P. F. Pithawala as Kallu
- Azurie as Zarinah

== Songs ==
- Mera Mann Kho Gaya; singer: Ashok Kumar.
- Mai Harijan Ki Chori; singer: Rajkumari Dubey, Arun Kumar

== Awards ==
- 1942: BFJA Awards: Best Screenplay: KA Abbas
