= Lihaaf =

- Short story by Ismat Chughtai
- Country: India
- Language: Urdu
- Genre: Short story

Publication
- Published in: Adab-i-Latif
- Publication type: Literary journal
- Publication date: 1942

"Lihaaf" ("The Quilt") is an Urdu short story written by Ismat Chughtai which was published in the Urdu literary journal Adab-i-Latif in 1942. In the coming decades, it was widely anthologised and faced an obscenity trial. It is one of Chughtai's most well-known works.

The story deals with suggestive lesbianism, but also with the insulated and suffocating life of a neglected wife in a feudal society as well as sexual abuse.

== Storyline ==
The story is told from the point of view of a young girl who is the niece of the central character, the beautiful, older Begum Jaan. Begum Jaan has had a very depressing life after marriage. Her husband, the Nawab, was much older than her and was respected for never having had any encounters with prostitutes, but Begum Jaan soon realised that it was because he was interested in the company of young, attractive men. Begum Jaan starts to wither but is saved by Rabbu, her servant woman who is not so pretty but very skilled with her hands. She is constantly massaging Begum Jaan’s body in some way. When the narrator is left at Begum Jaan's place by her mother, she realises that despite her past admiration for Begum Jaan, there lie many secrets with her.

At night, shadows in the form of an elephant formed by the quilt of Begum Jaan leaves the narrator in fear. In the absence of Rabbu, Begum Jaan’s behaviour changes as she is irritated and sad. The stay at her aunt’s house leaves the narrator traumatised when Begum Jaan not only sexually abuses her in Rabbu’s absence but also when she turns on the light one night as the quilt is shaking and ends up seeing something she didn’t want to see. It is never revealed what that is as the story ends abruptly.

== Reception ==
The publication of "Lihaaf" ("The Quilt") led to much controversy, uproar and an obscenity trial, where Ismat had to defend herself in the Lahore Court. She was asked to apologize and refused, winning the case after her lawyer said that the story makes no suggestion to a sexual act, and prosecution witnesses could not point out any obscene words: the story is merely suggestive and told from perspective of a small girl. Years later, she mentioned in detail the court trial in her memoir, Kaghazi Hai Pairahan (A Life in Words: Memoir).

The short story became a landmark for its early depiction of sex, at the time, a taboo in modern Indian literature, let alone Urdu literature.

== Film adaptations ==
Fire, a 1996 Hindi film directed by Deepa Mehta and starring Shabana Azmi and Nandita Das was loosely based on the short story. The short story was adapted to short film by the same name directed by Rohan Sonawane. Lihaaf: The Quilt is a 2019 Indian Hindi-language period drama film based on the story; directed by Rahat Kazmi, starring Anushka Sen, Tannishtha Chatterjee, Mir Sarwar, Sonal Sehgal, Shoib Nikash Shah, Namita Lal and Virendra Saxena. The film Dedh Ishqiya is loosely based on the story and references it in dialogue.

== Bibliography ==
- The Quilt and Other Stories, New Delhi, Kali for Women, 1996.
