= Chhote Babu =

- Directed by: Harsukh Bhatt
- Produced by: Shekhar
- Starring: Shekhar; Nimmi; Abhi Bhattacharya
- Music by: Madan Mohan
- Release date: 1957
- Country: India
- Language: Hindi

Chhote Babu is a 1957 Indian Hindi-language film directed by Harsukh Bhatt. It stars Shekhar, Nimmi, and Abhi Bhattacharya; and features a soundtrack composed by Madan Mohan. The film marked Shekhar's debut as a film producer.

Chhote Babu received mixed reviews from contemporary critics: The Times of India praised its music and dances, while Filmindia criticised the direction, dismissing the film as a "dull" and "unconvincing".

== Cast ==
- Shekhar
- Nimmi
- Abhi Bhattacharya
