= Agni Rekha =

- Directed by: Mahesh Kaul
- Starring: Sanjeev Kumar; Bindu
- Music by: Jagdish J
- Release date: 15 June 1973
- Country: India
- Language: Hindi

Agni Rekha is a 1973 Bollywood drama film directed by Mahesh Kaul. The film stars Sanjeev Kumar and Bindu.

== Plot ==
Suresh's wife dies due to some illness, leaving behind her mother and two children, Chunnu and Munni. Suresh's mother wants Suresh to marry Mohini, but he hesitates. Meanwhile, Munni and Chuunu's teacher goes on a month-long tour, leaving behind temporary teacher Nirmala. Children soon, like Nirmala, will come close to her. Suresh, after seeing the love and affection of Nirmala towards the children, started liking her. She, too, likes Suresh, but her past stops her from admitting her love for Suresh. She writes her past in a diary and gives it to Suresh. In the past, she had been raped by her father's friend's son. Her drunken father kills the rapist and is imprisoned. The rape leads to Nirmala's pregnancy, and she keeps the child in an orphanage. After learning about her past, Suresh still loves her and is ready to accept her and her child. Suresh tells his mother that he wants to marry Nirmala, but she does not agree. She asks Nirmala to leave Suresh's life, as this marriage would only bring problems to his life. Nirmala leaves the city and goes to a Baba in a temple and works there. After learning that their new mother had left them, the children ran away from home to find Nirmala. On the other side, Mohini moves into Suresh's house to marry him. Suresh unsuccessfully tries to find the children. Children reach the same temple where Nirmala stays, and Nirmala informs Suresh that the children are with her. Suresh reaches the temple to bring back the children and also asks Nirmala to return to him for the sake of the children. Nirmala agrees to return only if she will stay as a maid in the house, and Suresh should marry someone else. Suresh unwillingly agrees to her condition. Suresh's marriage is fixed with Mohini. Depressed and disappointed, Suresh becomes an alcoholic. Finally, Mohini leaves with her boyfriend on the day of marriage, knowing that Suresh will never give her true love, and Suresh's mother accepts Nirmala.

== Cast ==
- Sanjeev Kumar as Suresh
- Sharada as Nirmala
- G. Asrani as Mohini's boyfriend Bunty
- Bindu as Mohini Raizada
- Durga Khote as Suresh's mother
- Helen

== Soundtrack ==
All songs were written by Kavi Pradeep.

#	Title	Singer(s)
1	"Geet Hai Yeh Zindagi"	Chandrani Mukherjee
2	"Geet Hai Yeh Zindagi"	Manna Dey
3	"Hawaen Payal Baja Rahi Hain"	Asha Bhosle
4	"Jan-E-Man Jan-E-Jan"	Asha Bhosle
5	"Lut Gaya Hai Kiska Dil"	Asha Bhosle
6	"Na Apna Tha Jo Kal Guzra"	Mukesh
7	"Yaar Mere Meri Bahon Men Aaja"	Mohammed Rafi
