= Devendra Goel =

Indian film director (1919–1979)

- Born: 3 March 1919; Meerut, United Provinces of Agra and Oudh, British India
- Died: 26 February 1979 (aged 59); Bombay, Maharashtra, India
- Years active: 1950 to 1978
- Spouse: Rajkumari Sadanah
- Awards: Silver Jubilee Award for Dus Lakh

Devendra Goel (3 March 1919 – 26 February 1979) was an Indian film director and producer of Bollywood films and best known for his work in the 1950s and early 1960s.

He directed Aankhen on his debut. Devendra Goel also directed the Marathi film, Dost Asava Tar Asa with Ramesh Deo, Deven Varma and Padma Chavan. He directed the hit Ek Saal (1957) with Madhubala. His son Ajay Goel was also a filmmaker.

== Filmography ==
- Aankhen (1950)
- Ada (1951)
- Aas (1953)
- Albeli (1955)
- Vachan (1955): producer
- Narsi Bhagat (1957)
- Ek Saal (1957)
- Chirag Kahan Roshni Kahan (1959)
- Razia Sultana (1961)
- Pyaar Ka Saagar (1961)
- Door Ki Awaz (1964)
- Ayeel Basant Bahar (1965) (Bhojpuri film)
- Dus Lakh (1966)
- Ek Phool Do Mali (1969)
- Dharkan (1972)
- Ek Mahal Ho Sapno Ka (1975)
- Aadmi Sadak Ka (1977)
- Do Musafir (1978)
- Dost Asava Tar Asa (Marathi Film)
