= List of Hindi films of 1962 =

A list of films produced by the Bollywood film industry based in Mumbai in 1962:

== Highest-grossing films ==
The ten highest-grossing films at the Indian box office in 1962:

Rank	Title	Gross collection
1	Bees Saal Baad	₹3 crore
2	Ek Musafir Ek Haseena	₹2.5 crore
3	Professor	₹2 crore
4	Hariyali Aur Raasta	₹1.9 crore
5	Asli-Naqli	₹1.8 crore
6	Dil Tera Diwana	₹1.7 crore
7	Anpadh	₹1.6 crore
8	Aarti	₹1.5 crore
9	China Town	₹1.4 crore
10	Sangeet Samrat Tansen	₹1.3 crore

== A-B ==
Title	Director	Cast	Genre	Notes
Aalha Udal	Jaswant Jhaveri	P. Jairaj, Nirupa Roy, Sabita Chatterjee, Dilip Raj, Jeevan, Sapru, Ishwarlal	Historical fiction, Fantasy	Music: Jamal Sen; Lyrics: Pandit Indra
Aankh Michouli	Ravindra Dave	Shekhar, Mala Sinha, Jeevan, S. Nasir, Leela Mishra, Jagdish Raj, Naazi	Crime Thriller	Music: Chitragupta; Lyrics: Majrooh Sultanpuri
Aarti	Phani Mazumdar	Ashok Kumar, Meena Kumari, Pradeep Kumar, Shashikala, Rajendra Nath, Peace Kanwal, Ramesh Deo, Chandrima Bhaduri, Keshto Mukherjee	Family Drama	Produced: Tarachand Barjatya. Music: Roshan; Lyrics: Majrooh Sultanpuri
Aashiq	Hrishikesh Mukherjee	Raj Kapoor, Nanda, Padmini, Keshto Mukherjee and Leela Chitnis	Musical melodrama	Music: Shankar Jaikishan; Lyrics: Hasrat Jaipuri, Shailendra
Anpadh	Mohan Kumar	Dharmendra, Mala Sinha, Balraj Sahni, Bindu, Shashikala, Aruna Irani, Dhumal, Nazir Hussain	Social Family Drama	Music: Madan Mohan; Lyrics: Raja Mehdi Ali Khan
Apna Banake Dekho	Jagdish Nirula	Manoj Kumar, Asha Parekh, Sajjan, Sunder, Nazir Hussain, Mohan Choti	Romance	Music: Ravi; Lyrics: Asad Bhopali, S. H. Bihari
Asli-Naqli	Hrishikesh Mukherjee	Dev Anand, Sadhana, Anwar Hussain, Leela Chitnis, Sandhya Roy and Keshto Mukherjee	Romantic Drama	Music: Shankar Jaikishan; Lyrics: Shailendra
Baaje Ghungroo	Shivraj Shrivastav	Manhar Desai, Nalini Chonkar, Sheela Kashmiri, Leela Mishra, Nazir Kashmiri, Jagdish Kanwal	Fantasy Drama	Music: Dhaniram; Lyrics: Raja Mehdi Ali Khan, Shivraj Shrivastav, Madan Mohan
Baat Ek Raat Ki	Shankar Mukherjee	Dev Anand, Waheeda Rehman, Chandrashekhar, Johnny Walker, Sabita Chatterjee, Asit Sen, Ulhas, Jagdish Sethi	Romance Thriller	Music: S. D. Burman; Lyrics: Majrooh Sultanpuri
Baghdad Ki Raaten	Nanabhai Bhatt	Mahipal, Shakila, Bhagwan, Ishwarlal, Leela Mishra, Ratanmala	Action Fantasy	Music: Dilip Dholakia; Lyrics: Prem Dhawan
Banarsi Thug	Lekhraj Bhakri	Manoj Kumar, Vijaya Chaudhary, I. S. Johar, Lalita Choudhary, Radhakishan, Malika, Madhumati	Romantic comedy, Drama	Music: Iqbal Qureshi; Lyrics: Hasrat Romani, Gulshan Bawra, Prem Dhawan, Aziz Kaisi, Akhtar Warsi
Banke Sanwaria	Danpat Rai	P. Jairaj, Chand Usmani, Achala Sachdev, Rajan Kapoor, Jeevankala, Mirajkar	Action	Music: S. Mohinder; Lyrics: Anand Bakshi
Bapu Ne Kaha Tha	Vijay Bhatt	Jankidas, Neena, Manju, Sandeep, Kesari, Jugal Kishore, Majnu, Nana Palsikar	Children	Children's Film Society, India.
Bees Saal Baad	Biren Nag	Waheeda Rehman, Biswajeet, Manmohan Krishna, Madan Puri, Sajjan, Lata Sinha	Romantic Thriller	Music: Hemant Kumar; Lyrics: Shakeel Badayuni
Bombay Ka Chor	S. D. Narang	Kishore Kumar, Mala Sinha, Jagdish Raj, Amar, Iftekhar, Honey Irani, Helen, Pratima Devi	Romance, Crime	Music: Ravi; Lyrics: Rajendra Krishan
Bezubaan	Ram Kamlani	Ashok Kumar, Nirupa Roy, David, Shammi, Helen, Anoop Kumar, Babloo	Family Drama	Music: Chitragupta; Lyrics: Prem Dhawan
Bijli Chamke Jamna Paar	Jaswant Jhaveri	P. Jairaj, Nirupa Roy, Tabassum, Dhumal, Raj Kishore	Drama	Music: S. N. Tripathi; Lyrics: Kaifi Azmi
Burmah Road	Tara Harish	Ashok Kumar, Sheikh Mukhtar, Kumkum, Vijaya Choudhary, Moti Sagar, Mohan Choti, Uma Dutt, Murad, Jeevankala, Ajit		Music: Chitragupta; Lyrics: Majrooh Sultanpuri

== C-K ==
Title	Director	Cast	Genre	Notes
China Town	Shakti Samanta	Shammi Kapoor, Shakila, Helen, Madan Puri, Jeevankala, Mridula, S. N. Banerjee, Kanu Roy	Romantic thriller	Music: Ravi; Lyrics: Majrooh Sultanpuri
Deccan Queen	Akkoo	Samar Roy, Krishna Kumari, Sheela Kashmiri, Indira Bansal, Maqbul, Habib	Action	Music: Sardul Kwatra; Lyrics: Aziz Kashmiri, K. Bakshi
Dil Tera Diwana	B. R. Panthulu	Shammi Kapoor, Mala Sinha, Mehmood, Shubha Khote, Pran, Om Prakash, Manmohan Krishna, Mohan Choti, Ulhas, Mumtaz Begum	Romantic Drama	Music: Shankar Jaikishan; Lyrics: Hasrat Jaipuri, Shailendra
Dr. Vidya	Rajendra Bhatia	Vyjayanthimala, Manoj Kumar, Madan Puri, Prem Chopra, Mumtaz, Sunder, Helen, Nazir Hussain	Social family Drama	Music: S. D. Burman; Lyrics: Majrooh Sultanpuri
Durga Pooja	B. K. Adarsh	Anant Kumar, Jaymala, B. M. Vyas, Naazi, Hiralal	Devotional	Music: Shivram; Lyrics: Pandit Indra
Dilli Ka Dada	R. S. Tara	Sheikh Mukhtar, Shekhar, Sahira, Mukri, Nishi, Kumar	Action	Music: Datta Naik; Lyrics: Sahir Ludhianvi, Jan Nisar Akhtar
Ek Musafir Ek Hasina	Raj Khosla	Sadhana, Joy Mukherjee, Malika, Rajendranath, Kamal Kapoor, Dhumal, Jagdish Raj	Romantic Drama	S. Mukherjee Production. Music: O. P. Nayyar; Lyrics: Raja Mehdi Ali Khan, Shevan Rizvi, S. H. Bihari
Gangu	Pramod Chakravorty	Sheikh Mukhtar, Naaz, Chandrashekhar, Sulochana, Madan Puri, Mohan Choti	Action	Music: Kalyanji Anandji; Lyrics: Prem Dhawan
Girls' Hostel	Ravindra Dave	Ajit Khan, Nalini Jaywant, Johnny Walker, Shashi Raj, Geetanjali, Chand Burque	Romantic Drama	Music: Ravi; Lyrics: S. H. Bihari, Gulshan Bawra
Gyara Hazar Ladkian	K. A. Abbas	Bharat Bhushan, Mala Sinha, David, Mukri, Murad, Nadira, Helen, Baby Farida	Social Romantic drama	Music: N. Dutta; Lyrics: Majrooh Sultanpuri
Half Ticket	B. Kalidas	Kishore Kumar, Madhubala, Pran, Shammi, Tun Tun, Manorama, Helen	Romantic comedy	Music: Salil Chowdhury; Lyrics: Shailendra
Hame Bhi Jeene Do	M. G. Ramachandran	M. G. Ramachandran, B. Saroja Devi, P. Bhanumati		Music S. M. Subbaiah Naidu; Lyrics: B. S. Kalla, Saraswati Kumar Deepak
Hamen Khelne Do	R. K. Sharma	Chaman Puri, Neena Chopra, Dubey, Master Raja	Children	Producer: Children's Film Society, India. Music: Anil Biswas
Hariyali Aur Rasta	Vijay Bhatt	Manoj Kumar, Mala Sinha, Om Prakash, Shashikala, Manmohan Krishna, Jagdeep, Surendra, Helen	Romantic Family Drama	Music: Shankar Jaikishan; Lyrics: Shailendra, Hasrat Jaipuri
Hawa Mahal	B J Patel	Rajan, Helen, Bela Bose, Sulochana, Jeevan, Tiwari, Murad	Fantasy	Music: Avinash Vyas; Lyrics: Saraswati Kumar Deepak, Raja Mehdi Ali Khan, Aziz Kashmiri
Hong Kong	Pachhi	Ashok Kumar, B. Saroja Devi, K. N. Singh, Om Prakash, Helen, Babu Rao, King Kong (wrestler)	Action Thriller	Music: O. P. Nayyar; Lyrics: Raja Mehdi Ali Khan, Qamar Jalalabadi, Shewan Rizvi, S. H. Bihari
Isi Ka Naam Duniya Hai	Shakti Samanta	Ashok Kumar, Mehmood Shyama, Om Prakash, Sahira, K. N. Singh, Helen, Nazir Hussain	Socia Family drama	Music: Ravi; Lyrics: S. H. Bihari
Jadoo Mahal	Aakkoo	Helen, Azad, Hiralal, Ram Kumar, Krishna Kumari	Fantasy	Music: Bulo C Rani; Lyrics: Shewan Rizvi
Jai Ho Mohabbat Ki	Vithaldas Panchotia	Paresh Banerjee, Meera, Mirza Musharraf, Najma, Heera Sawant, Helen, V Panchotia, Sulbha Kataria	Comedy Drama	Music: Harbanslal, Amar Singh, Moti Babu; Lyrics: Pandit Madhur
Jadugar Daku	Chandrakant	P. Jairaj, Jabeen, Madhumalti, Helen, Maruti, Bela Bose, Tun Tun	Fantasy	Music: S. N. Tripathi; Lyrics: Prem Dhawan
Jhoola	K. Shankar	Sunil Dutt, Vyjayantimala, Pran, Rajendranath, Sulochana, Tun Tun, Manmohan Krishna, Raj Mehra	Family Drama	Music: Salil Chowdhary; Lyrics: Rajendra Krishan
Kailashpati	Dhirubhai Desai	Mahesh Desai, Sumitra Devi, Padmarani, Niranajan Sharma, Jeevan	Mythological	Music: Avinash Vyas; Lyrics: Madan Bharti
Kala Chashma	K. Vinod	Manju, Amarnath, Madan Puri, Maruti, Sheela Kashmiri, Jeevankala, Sheikh	Action Crime	Music: Sardul Kwatra; Lyrics: Bismil Ludhianvi
Kala Samundar	R. P. Ashk	P. Jairaj, Chitra, Maruti, Hiralal, Tun Tun, Radhika	Action	Music: Datta Naik; Lyrics: Sahir Ludhianvi, Ram Prakash Ashq, Anand Bakshi
King Kong	Babubhai Mistri	Dara Singh, as King Kong,Kumkum, Randhawa, King Kong (wrestler), Paul Sharma as senapati, Uma Dutt, Raja Leela Mishra, Chandrashekhar as Badal, Kamal Mehra	Action	Music: Chitragupta; Lyrics: Majrooh Sultanpuri

== L-P ==
Title	Director	Cast	Genre	Notes
Maa Beta	Lekhraj Bhakri	Manoj Kumar, Ameeta, Sheila Ramani, I. S. Johar, Nirupa Roy, Lalita Pawar, Tarun Bose, Manmohan Krishna, Manorama, Leela Mishra	Family Drama	Music: Hemant Kumar; Lyrics: Prem Dhawan
Madam Zapatta	Ram Rasila	Azad, Mehroo, Bhagwan, Heera, Sawant, Ram Rasila, Gulab	Action	Music: Harbanslal; Lyrics: Zafar Rahi, Kaiser Malik
Madam Zorro	Aakkoo	Azad, Nadira, Helen, Bhagwan, Sheikh, Tiwari	Action	Music: Bulo C Rani; Lyrics: Shewan Rizvi
Main Chup Rahungi	A. Bhim Singh	Sunil Dutt, Meena Kumari, Babloo, Jagirdar, Nana Palsikar, Mohan Choti, Helen, Raj Mehra	Social Family Drama	Music: Chitragupta; Lyrics: Rajendra Krishan
Main Shadi Karne Chala	Roop K. Shorey	I. S. Johar, Sayeeda Khan, Tabassum, Praveen Choudhary, Mumtaz, Malika, Durga Khote, Feroze Khan, Rajendra Nath	Comedy	Wadia Brothers. Music: Chitragupta; Lyrics: Majrooh Sultanpuri
Mall Road	Viren Dablish	Chandrashekhar, Sangeeta, Kesari, Bela Bose, Radheshyam	Action Romance	Music: Sudarshan; Lyrics: Viren Dablish, Naqsh Lyallpuri, Prem Warbartani
Man-Mauji	R. Krishnan, S. Panju	Kishore Kumar, Sadhana, Pran, Achala Sachdev, Naaz, Om Prakash, Mukri, Leela Chitnis	Family Drama	Music: Madan Mohan; Lyrics: Rajendra Krishan
Maya Jaal	Babubhai Mistry	Ranjan, Chitra, Manhar Desai, Krishna Kumari, Radhika	Fantasy	Music: S. N. Tripathi; Lyrics: Qamar Jalalabadi, Prem Dhawan
Mehndi Lagi Mere Hath	Suraj Prakash	Shashi Kapoor, Nanda, Ashok Kumar, Achala Sachdev, Mridula	Romance, Family Drama	Music: Kalyanji Anandji; Lyrics: Anand Bakshi
Meri Bahen	A S A Swami	M. G. Ramachandran, Padmini, Raja Sulochana, Kumud Tripathi	Family Drama	Music: Dhaniram; Lyrics: Pandit Indra
Naag Devta	Shantilal Soni	Mahipal, Anjali Devi, Shashikala, B. M. Vyas, Leela Chitnis, Niranajan Sharma	Fantasy	Music: S. N. Tripathi; Lyrics: Qamar Jalalabadi, Prakash Mehra
Nakli Nawab	Tara Harish	Ashok Kumar, Manoj Kumar, Shakila, K. N. Singh, Kamal Kapoor, Indira Billi, Shammi	Family Drama	Music: Babul; Lyrics: Kaif Irfani, Raja Mehdi Ali Khan
Naughty Boy	Shakti Samanta	Kishore Kumar, Kalpana, Sulochana, Om Prakash, Madan Puri, Sunder	Romantic comedy	Music: S. D. Burman; Lyrics: Shailendra
Neeli Aankhen	Ved Mohan	Ajit, Shakeela, Helen, Johnny Walker, Tiwari, Tun Tun, Raj Mehra, Shetty	Romance, Thriller	Music: Dattaram Wadkar; Lyrics: Gulshan Bawra
Pathan	Ataullah Khan	Premnath, Mumtaz, Achala Sachdev, Iftekhar, Bhagwan	Action	Music: Jimmy, Dattraj Shyambabu, Brij Bhushan, Fakir Mohammad Asar; Lyrics: Anjum Jaipuri, Khawar Zaman, Nazeem Jaipuri, Aish Kanwal, Bal Kishan Puri
Prempatra	Bimal Roy	Shashi Kapoor, Sadhana, Chand Usmani, Rajendra Nath, Seema Deo, Parveen Choudhary, Satyen Kappu	Social Romance Drama	Music: Salil Chowdhary; Lyrics: Rajendra Krishan, Gulzar
Private Secretary	Chander	Ashok Kumar, Jayshree Gadkar, Raja Gowswami, Umakant, Mohan Choti, Purnima, N. A. Ansari	Action Drama	Music: D. Dilip; Lyrics: Prem Dhawan
Professor	Lekh Tandon	Shammi Kapoor, Kalpana, Salim, Parveen Choudhary, Lalita Pawar, Iftekhar, Tun Tun, Pratima Devi	Romantic comedy	Music: Shankar Jaikishan; Lyrics: Hasrat Jaipuri, Shailendra
Pyaar Ki Jeet	Vasant Painter	Mahipal, Kalpana Mohan, Indira, Mohan Choti, Hiralal, Paul Sharma	Romantic Drama	Music: Sudhir Phadke; Lyrics: Qamar Jalalabadi

== R-Z ==
Title	Director	Cast	Genre	Notes
Raaz Ki Baat	Bolton Ci Nagi	Sujit Kumar, Simi Garewal, Abhi Bhattacharya, Shyama, Sulochana, K. N. Singh, Agha, Mohan Choti	Thriller	Music: Robin Banerjee; Lyrics: Hairat Sitapuri
Raju Aur Gangaram	Ezra Mir	Mridula, Abhimanyu Sharma	Children	10th All India Certificate of Merit for the Best Children's Film. Produced by: Children's Film Society
Rakhi	A. Bhimsen	Ashok Kumar, Waheeda Rehman, Pradeep Kumar, Ameeta, Mehmood, Mohan Choti	Family Drama	Music: Ravi; Lyrics: Rajendra Krishan
Rashtraveer Shivaji	R. C. Talwar	Shyam Kumar, Ratnamala, Bela Bose, Heera Sawant, Rajrani, Radheshyam, Fazal Khan	Historical	Music: Suresh Talwar; Lyrics: Anjaan
Reporter Raju	Dwarka Khosla	Feroz Khan, Chitra, Indira Billi, Sulochana Chatterjee, Manorama, B. M. Vyas, Ratanmala, Manju	Action, Crime	Music: S. Mohinder; Lyrics: Anand Bakshi, Raja Mehdi Ali Khan, Shakeel Nomani, Anjaan
Rocket Girl	Nanabhai Bhatt	Naaz, Bhagwan, Nilofer, Shammi, Soodesh Kumar, Kanchan, Brahm Bhardawaj, Jagdish Raj	Action Fantasy	Music: Chitragupta; Lyrics: Prem Dhawan
Rooplekha	Mohammed Hussain	Mahipal, Vijaya Chaudhary, Krishna Kumari, Raj Adib, Shyam Kumar, Sunder, Jeevankala, Amar	Fantasy	Music: Nashad; Lyrics: Faruk Kaiser
Rungoli	Amar Kumar	Kishore Kumar, Vyjayanthimala, Jeevan, Durga Khote, Nazir Hussain, Sadhana Roychowdhary, Iftekhar, Dhumal, Brahm Bhardawaj	Romantic Drama	Music: Shankar Jaikishan; Lyrics: Hasrat Jaipuri, Shailendra
Sachche Moti	Omi Bedi	Jabeen, Suresh, Johnny Walker, Jeevan, Sulochana, Manmohan Krishna, Shammi	Crime Drama Romance	Music: Datta Naik; Lyrics: Sahir Ludhianvi
Sahib Bibi Aur Ghulam	Abrar Alvi	Meena Kumari, Guru Dutt, Waheeda Rehman, Rehman, Nazir Hussain, Dhumal, Harindranath Chattopadhyay, Pratima Devi, Jawahar Kaul, Minu Mumtaz	Drama	Entered into the 13th Berlin International Film Festival. Music: Hemant Kumar; Lyrics: Shakeel Badayuni
Sakhi Robin	B. J. Patel	Ranjan, Shalini, Babu Raje, Nilofar, Rajan Kapoor	Action	Music: Robin Chatterjee; Lyrics: Yogesh Gaud
Sangeet Samrat Tansen	S. N. Tripathi	Bharat Bhushan, Anita Guha, Sabita Chatterjee, David, Sapru, Kumar, Mukri	Biopic Historical Drama	Music: S. N. Tripathi; Lyrics: Shailendra
Sautela Bhai	Mahesh Kaul	Guru Dutt, Pranati (Pranoti Ghosh), Raj Kumar, Kanhaiyalal, Bipin Gupta, Asit Sen, S. N. Banerjee, Bela Bose, Honey Irani, Sarosh Irani	Family Drama	National Film Award for Third Best Feature Film. Music: Anil Biswas; Lyrics: Shailendra
Shaadi	R. Krishnan, S. Panju	Saira Banu, Manoj Kumar, Dharmendra, Balraj Sahni, Om Prakash, Kalpana, Sulochana	Family Drama	Music: Chitragupta; Lyrics: Rajendra Krishan
Sher Khan	Radhakant	Kamaljit, Kumkum, Jayant, Veena, Sunder, Ulhas, Tabassum, Hiralal	Action	Music: S. N. Tripathi; Lyrics: Prem Dhawan
Shiv Parvati	S. N. Tripathi	Trilok Kapoor, Ragini, Vandana, Jeevan, Praveen Paul, Nayampally		Music: S. N. Tripathi; Lyrics: Prem Dhawan, Saraswati Kumar Deepak
Shree Ganesh	S. S. Dharwadkar	Mahipal, Sahira, Indira Billi, Krishna Kumari, Jeevankala, Uma Dutt, Tiwari	Religious	Music: Bulo C Rani; Lyrics: Indeevar, Madhur
Son of India	Mehboob Khan	Kumkum, Kanwaljeet, Sajid Khan, Jayant, Kanhaiyalal, Mukri, Simi Garewal, Tun Tun, Kumar, Lilian	Family Melodrama	Music: Naushad; Lyrics: Shakeel Badayuni
Soorat Aur Seerat	Rajnish Bahl	Dharmendra, Nutan, K. N. Singh, Sulochana, Honey Irani, Asit Sen, Iftekhar, Badri Prasad, Leela Mishra	Drama	Music: Roshan; Lyrics: Shailendra, Sahir Ludhianvi
Tilasmi Duniya	A. Karim	Daljit, Krishna Kumari, Mohan Sherry, Indira Billi, Shyam Kumar, Sarla Devi, Jillani	Fantasy Action	Music: Suresh Talwar; Lyrics: Sartaj Romani, Anjaan
Toofani Tarzan	A. R. Zamindar	Azad, Shanta Kumari, Shyam Kumar, Jeevankala, Tun Tun, Aruna, Lata Arora	Action Adventure	Music: Iqbal; Lyrics: Sabah Afghani
Tower House	N. A. Ansari	Ajit Khan, Shakila, N. A. Ansari	Thriller	S. H. Bihari-Ravi
Umeed	Nitin Bose	Ashok Kumar, Joy Mukherjee, Nanda		
Vallah Kya Baat Hai	Hari Walia	Shammi Kapoor, Bina Rai, Nishi, Mumtaz, K. N. Singh, Tun Tun, Maruti, Mohan Choti	Romantic Drama	Music: Roshan; Lyrics: Anand Bakshi, Prem Dhawan
Zindagi Aur Hum	Anand Kumar	Nalini Jaywant, Dinesh, Chand Usmani, David, Mukri, Leela Mishra	Drama	Music: Roshan; Lyrics: Shiv Kumar Saroj, Veer Mohammed Puri
