= The Prince Who Was a Thief =

1951 film by Rudolph Maté

- Directed by: Rudolph Maté
- Screenplay by: Gerald Drayson Adams; Aeneas MacKenzie
- Based on: Story by Theodore Dreiser
- Produced by: Leonard Goldstein
- Starring: Tony Curtis; Piper Laurie
- Cinematography: Irving Glassberg
- Edited by: Edward Curtiss
- Music by: Hans J. Salter
- Color process: Technicolor
- Production company: Universal Pictures
- Distributed by: Universal Pictures
- Release dates: June 29, 1951 (Detroit); July 3, 1951 (New York)
- Running time: 89 minutes
- Country: United States
- Language: English
- Box office: $1,475,000 (U.S. rentals)

The Prince Who Was a Thief is a 1951 American Technicolor swashbuckler adventure film directed by Rudolph Maté and starring Piper Laurie and Tony Curtis in his first starring role. The film was produced and distributed by Universal Pictures.

== Plot ==
In 13th-century Tangiers, master thief Yussef, hired by Mokar, an agent of the city's regent Prince Mustapha, is sent to kill baby prince Hussein so that Mustapha can claim the throne in Hussein's stead. However, Yussef cannot allow himself to commit the murder, so he raises the child as his own and names him Julna. The only proof of Julna's true identity is a tattoo of the royal seal on his arm, which Yussef keeps hidden under a silver armband.

Eighteen years later, Julna infiltrates Mustapha's palace to raid the treasury but is thwarted by the room's tightly barred window. While evading the guards, he glimpses Mustapha's daughter Yasmin and falls in love with her. Yasmin is the promised bride of Hedjah, the prince of Algiers, who arrives with the fabled Pearl of Fatima as a gift for her. Soon after, a young street acrobat and thief named Tina sneaks into Yasmin's bedchamber and steals the gem. Infuriated, Hedjah promises to raze Tangiers to the ground unless the pearl is recovered in one month.

Mustapha tasks Yussef with the pearl's recovery and the capture of the thief. To lure the thief into a trap, Julna stages a fake lottery with a large ruby as the prize. Tina hides inside Yussef's coffeehouse to later emerge and steal the ruby, but Julna and his adopted parents catch her and find that she has the pearl. Noting her agility as she tries to escape, Julna and Yussef use her to slip into Mustapha's treasury. They return the pearl, but Tina secretly steals it again, casting suspicion on Yussef. When Julna enters the palace to claim the reward, he learns of the new theft. Yasmin sees him and longs for him as well as for the pearl. This infuriates Tina, who also has a crush on Julna.

Julna, Yussef and Tina sneak into the palace to plunder the treasury. They escape with a good portion of the gold, but the robbery is noticed. Yasmin, still desiring the pearl above all else, suspects Julna of having it and offers her hand in marriage to him, planning to have him killed after he has returned the pearl. Julna suspects Mokar of having stolen it and intends to recover it from him. When Tina tries to stop him, Julna reveals his true identity to her, and now feeling unworthy of marrying him, she gives him the pearl.

When Julna enters the palace to see Yasmin, Tina sneaks after him, discovers the trap and warns Julna, who is able to escape. Tina is captured and questioned about the location of the pearl. With the help of street thieves, Julna attacks the guard train, triggering a battle that causes Julna's group to become cornered in the palace treasury. To stop the fighting, Tina threatens to destroy the pearl and identifies Julna as the true ruler of Tangiers. The guards, still loyal to their old ruler, revolt against Mustapha, and Mustapha and Yasmin are captured and banished from Tangiers. Julna assumes his rightful throne and takes Tina, with whom he has truly fallen in love, as his wife and queen.

== Cast ==
- Tony Curtis as Julna/Prince Hussein
- Piper Laurie as Tina
- Everett Sloane as Yussef
- Jeff Corey as Emir Mokar
- Betty Garde as Mirza
- Marvin Miller as Hakar
- Peggie Castle as Princess Yasmin
- Donald Randolph as Mustapha
- Nita Bieber as Cahuena
- Ramsay Hill as Prince Hedjah (uncredtited)
- Milada Mladova as Dancer
- Hayden Rorke as Basra
- Midge Ware as Sari
- Carol Varga as Beulah
- King Donovan as Merat

== Release ==
The film's world premiere was held at the Michigan Theater in Detroit, Michigan on June 29, 1951. The film's stars Tony Curtis and Piper Laurie, a Detroit native, attended the premiere and festivities, which included a block party in front of the theater.

== Reception ==
In a contemporary review for The New York Times, critic A. H. Weiler wrote: "[I]t is saccharine and sometimes swift make-believe which won't poison the minds of the young and most certainly won't affect their elders—one way or another."

== Adaptations ==
- Chor Bazar (1954), a 1954 Indian Hindi-language film directed by P. N. Arora and starring Shammi Kapoor, Chitra, and Sumitra Devi
