= S. K. Prabhakar =

Indian screenwriter and director

- Born: September 25, 1924
- Died: September 10, 1968 (aged 43)
- Occupations: Screenwriter; director
- Spouse: Chanchal
- Family: Madhubala (sister-in-law); Kishore Kumar (brother-in-law); Ataullah Khan (father-in-law)

S. K. Prabhakar (25 September 1924 – 10 September 1968) was an Indian screenwriter and director. His credits as a writer include Ek Saal (1957), Nartaki (1963), Ishaara (1964), and Pehchan (1970). As a director, he worked on the 1959 patriotic film Kal Hamara Hai, starring Madhubala.

Prabhakar was married to actress Chanchal.

== Career ==
Prabhakar began his film career as the screenplay and dialogue writer of Devendra Goel's Ek Saal (1957). The film received mixed reviews, though Prabhakar's dialogue writing was described as an "excellent" support to the characters by critic V. P. Sathe of Swarajya.

In late 1958, Prabhakar wrote the story and began directing K. Amarnath's production Kal Hamara Hai, described as "a topical drama of India of today and tomorrow". The film showcased its leading lady Madhubala's in a dual role of twin sisters with contrasting personalities. Released in early 1959, Kal Hamara Hai had a polarizing reception among critics. A reviewer for The Times of India panned the drama as "inconsequential", while Thought magazine conversely stated that Prabhakar's experience had evidently benefited his handling of the film.

While Kal Hamara Hai failed at the box office, according to Manju Amarnath, actor and filmmaker Manoj Kumar was influenced by Prabhakar's socio-political views, stating at a 2008 commemorative event that his patriotic screen persona "Bharat" was inspired by the male protagonist of Kal Hamara Hai.

Prabhakar worked as an editor on Do Ustad (1959). During the 1960s, he contributed dialogue, stories and screenplays to films such as Nartaki (1963), Ishaara (1964), Naunihal (1967), Pyar Ka Sapna (1969) and Pehchan (1970).

== Personal life and death ==
Prabhakar married actress Chanchal (born Zeb Ataullah), who was the daughter of film producer Ataullah Khan and sister of Madhubala.

Prabhakar died young due to complications from a ventricular septal defect.

== Filmography ==
Year	Title	Role	Ref
1957	Ek Saal	Screenplay and dialogue	
1957	Bada Bhai	Story	
1959	Nai Raahen	Story	
1959	Do Ustad	Editor	
1959	Kal Hamara Hai	Director and story	
1963	Nartaki	Dialogue	
1964	Ishaara	Story and screenwriter	
1967	Naunihal	Screenwriter	
1969	Pyar Ka Sapna	Screenwriter	
1970	Pehchan	Dialogue	
