= Prem Narayan Arora =

Indian film producer and director (1912–1985)

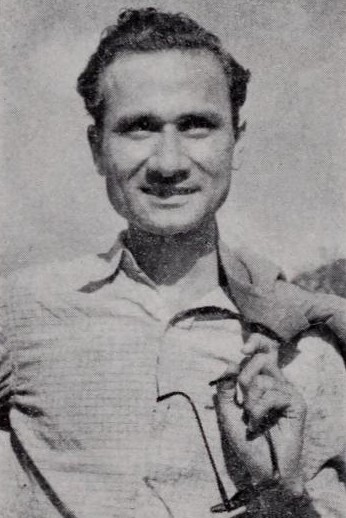
- Arora in 1942
- Born: 12 June 1912; Quetta, Balochistan, British India
- Died: 3 December 1985 (aged 73); Mumbai, Maharashtra, India
- Other name: P. N. Arora
- Occupations: Film producer; director
- Years active: 1930s–1972
- Organization: All India Pictures
- Spouse: Helen (m. 1957; div. 1974)

Prem Narayan Arora (12 June 1912 – 3 December 1985), also referred to as P. N. Arora, was an Indian film producer and director. His notable works include Pugree (1948), Pardes (1950), Rail Ka Dibba (1953), Khazanchi (1958) and Dil Daulat Duniya (1972). Film journalist Baburao Patel described Arora as a producer who brought "almost the speed of auto-mobile manufacture" to motion picture production.

Arora was married to actress and dancer Helen from 1957 to 1974. He died in 1985.

== Biography ==
Arora was born on 12 June 1912, in Quetta, Balochistan, British India. He made his debut as an independent sound recordist with Mehboob Khan's Jagirdar (1937). He later found his own production company, All India Pictures, and made his debut as a producer with the film Doli (1947), directed by S. K. Ojha. He gained prominence with Pugree (1948), which proved to be a critical and commercial success. Writing for filmindia, Baburao Patel called it "one of the best entertainers we have had recently" and added that Arora "deserves praise for giving us a different picture".

Arora went on to produce Paras (1949), Pardes (1950), and Nazneen (1951), all three starring Madhubala. Pardes was also co-produced by her. He was also involved with other early production ventures of Madhubala and Ataullah Khan (her father). In 1953, Arora made his directorial debut with Madhubala's second production Rail Ka Dibba, which also starred the newcomer Shammi Kapoor. The film was poorly received by the critic Ranjit Singh of The Sunday Standard, who dismissed Arora's direction as "unimaginative".

Arora met Anglo-Indian dancer Helen during the filming of Rail Ka Dibba. They married in 1957. She regularly featured in his subsequent films, which include Hoor-E-Arab (1955), Neelofar (1958), Khazanchi (1958) and Sindbad Alibaba and Aladdin (1965); none of these were particularly successful. In 1972, Arora remade Pugree into Dil Daulat Duniya, starring Rajesh Khanna and Sadhana Shivdasani.

Helen divorced Arora in 1974. He died in Mumbai on 3 December 1985.

== Filmography ==
- Doli (1947)
- Pugree (1948)
- Paras (1949)
- Pardes (1950) — Co-produced with Madhubala
- Nazneen (1951)
- Poonam (1952) — Co-produced with actress Kamini Kaushal
- Rail Ka Dibba (1953) — Directorial debut — Co-produced with Madhubala
- Chor Bazar (1954)
- Hoor-E-Arab (1955)
- Halaku (1956)
- Anjan (1956)
- Neelofar (1958)
- Khazanchi (1958)
- Sindbad Alibaba and Aladdin (1965)
- Dil Daulat Duniya (1972)— Remake of Pugree
