= Ataullah Khan (film producer) =

Indian film producer and director (died 1975)

- Born: Peshawar valley, Swabi District, British India
- Died: 1975
- Occupations: Employee at Imperial Tobacco Company (prior to 1930); film producer; director
- Organization: Madhubala Private Ltd.
- Works: See below
- Spouse: Ayesha Begum
- Children: 11, including Madhubala and Chanchal
- Relatives: Kishore Kumar (son-in-law); S. K. Prabhakar (son-in-law)

Ataullah Khan (Note: Also spelt as "Attaullah Khan" in some sources.) (died 1975) was an Indian film producer and director. He and his third daughter, the actress Madhubala, co-founded the production house Madhubala Private Ltd. on which he served as the managing director. The company produced three films: Naata (1955), Mehlon Ke Khwab (1960) and Pathan (1962)—the latter of which was also directed by Khan.

During the 1950s, Khan was a subject of significant media scrutiny for his rigid management of Madhubala's life and career. He was a central figure in the highly publicized Naya Daur court case (c. 1957), which he and Madhubala fought against filmmaker B. R. Chopra.

Besides Madhubala, three of Khan's other daughters, including Chanchal, pursued careers in Hindi cinema.

== Background and personal life ==
Ataullah Khan belonged to the Yusufzai tribe of Pashtuns from the Peshawar Valley, originating from Swabi District. Author Ziaullah Khan Jadoon wrote that Khan, who had family connections in Rawalpindi, traded and sold clay pots in the city as a youth. Khan later moved to Peshawar and obtained employment with the Imperial Tobacco Company, where he worked for approximately fifteen years before leaving the company following a dispute with his superior.

In 1930, Khan moved his family to Delhi in search of employment. He married the Lahore-based Ayesha Begum and had eleven children with her; six of these survived into adulthood: Kaneez Fatima, Altaf, Mumtaz (1933–1969), Zeb (born 1934), Shahida and Madhur Bhushan (née Zahida). The family was reported to be of middle-class Muslim background but began facing financial difficulties after Khan lost his job.

== Career ==
Khan began working on a film titled Pathan in 1939, but it was shelved and would not be revived for the next two decades. In 1941, Khan relocated along with his family to Bombay (now Mumbai) in search of better opportunities. While he was unable to land a job for himself, his third daughter, Mumtaz, secured acting assignments as a child artiste and later established herself within the Hindi film industry. By the late 1940s, Mumtaz adopted the screen name Madhubala and became a leading star of Hindi cinema.

Throughout her career until the mid-1960s, Khan acted as Madhubala's official manager—choosing her film scripts and directors, managing contracts and laying down rules regarding the time and place of shooting. He also fixed her work timings from 8 am to 6 pm, disallowed any media interactions on or off-set, and demanded that her romantic scenes be filmed only in his presence. Madhubala suffered from a heart condition (ventricular septal defect), which was diagnosed early but kept a secret by Khan to avoid jeopardizing her career. Wary of her health condition, Khan ensured clauses prohibiting night shootings or outdoor schedules in her film contracts.

According to the journal Swatantra, Khan and Madhubala first became involved in film production through collaborations with filmmaker Prem Narayan Arora; these included Pardes (1950) and Rail Ka Dibba (1953). In 1953, Khan and Madhubala co-founded the production company Madhubala Private Ltd. (MPL). Their early announced ventures included a film named Sayyad, which was being directed by Kamal Amrohi but was shelved midway for unknown reasons, causing the company a financial loss of ₹3 lakhs. Later projects like Mehbooba and Kisan Ki Gai were not finished either, while a big-budget historical project titled Shan-e-Awadh, with a story by Wajahat Mirza, was scrapped for the sole reason that the director's late coming infuriated Khan. By 1955, MPL was reported to have suffered a cumulative loss of ₹7 lakhs.

In 1955, Khan began production of D. N. Madhok's Naata, which was released in December as MPL's debut film. It introduced another of Khan's daughters, Zeb, who appeared in a supporting role under the screen name Chanchal. Naata, a drama starring Madhubala and Abhi Bhattacharya, had a mixed critical reception, with contemporary critic Baburao Patel calling it "a dull, poor and clumsy picture", while a reviewer for Swatantra hailed the film as a "commendable venture" for "providing clean, wholesome and neat fare devoid of any cheapness and vulgarity". The box office failure of Naata forced the father-daughter duo to mortgage a bungalow to recover their financial losses.

Khan returned to film production in 1960 with two films shot simultaneously: Mehlon Ke Khwab and Ghar Jawai. Both were comedies starring Kishore Kumar and Chanchal, with Madhubala playing the lead role in the former. Mehlon Ke Khwab was released in March 1960 and was not a commercial success. On the other hand, Ghar Jawai (featuring Chanchal as the female lead) remained unreleased due to a lack of distributor interest. In September 1960, Khan revived his directorial project, Pathan, and cast Madhubala and Prem Nath in lead roles. However, by then Madhubala's health was worsening due to her heart condition, and she was ultimately replaced by Mumtaz. Pathan was released in 1962 and was another financial disappointment for Khan.

== Disputes and legal issues ==
Khan was involved in multiple disputes against other film industry figures during the 1950s. In the beginning of the decade, he banned journalists from Madhubala's film sets due to negative press coverage of her background. Author Mohan Deep suggests that Khan was infuriated by gossip articles alleging his wife to be a "keep" and Madhubala being "the mother of a five-year-old child".

Khan's ban on journalists led to a boycott of Madhubala by the All India Action Committee; the issue was solved in 1951 after an apology by B. K. Karanjia. In March 1952, Khan sued several journalists, including editor Badri Kachwala (of Box-Office magazine), alleging defamation of his family. Kachwala subsequently issued a public apology to Khan, promising "not [to] write and publish any defamatory articles against [Khan] and [his] family". The court case was ultimately settled privately in late April.

In 1956, Khan went to court against filmmaker B. R. Chopra for dropping Madhubala out of his upcoming film Naya Daur (1957). The conflict had emerged due to Chopra replacing Madhubala, who had worked on the production for over a week, after Khan refused to allow her to travel to Bhopal for outdoor shootings. Khan cited his concerns for his daughter's safety in a region then known for dacoity—as well as his established preference for her to work within the controlled environments of Bombay studios.

The legal proceedings, which took place in early 1957, are regarded by film historian Bunny Reuben as the "most sensational court-case ever to be fought in the annals of Indian cinema". During the trial, Chopra alleged that Madhubala was pressurized by Khan to refuse his film and wrote a complaint letter to the Film Federation of India describing the struggles of filmmakers against the difficult "custodians" of film stars. The trials also brought attention to the romantic involvement of Madhubala with Dilip Kumar, the film's leading actor, whom Khan was reported to have disliked strongly. On later hearings, Khan accused Chopra and Kumar of filing the court case against his daughter "out of spite" because Madhubala had refused Kumar's advances. Many of these accusations from both sides remained unproven, and Chopra withdrew the case before the defence (Khan and Madhubala) could call their own witnesses. Khan was later said to have dismissed the lawsuit as a publicity stunt by Chopra for his film.

Several authors attribute the break-up of Madhubala and Kumar to Khan. In his 2014 autobiography, Kumar clarified that Khan was not against their decision to marry, but rather attempted to turn the relationship into a business arrangement by demanding that Kumar work exclusively under Khan's film productions. Kumar said that, unlike Madhubala, he found it difficult to "surrender to [Khan's] dictates and strategies" and eventually decided to break off the relationship.

== Later years and death ==
Khan fell on hard times after Madhubala married Kishore Kumar and retired from films. Initially, in 1960, Filmindia reported that Khan was considering opening a poultry business and settling in Madras, but did not proceed further. By 1964, he sold all of Madhubala's cars as well as a bungalow that was bought by actress Sadhana Shivdasani. The son of actor Prem Nath has said that his father helped Khan financially at the time.

Khan's later life was marked by isolation. Madhubala was bedridden due to her worsening heart condition while he himself struggled with health issues associated with old age. His younger daughters—Shahida and Zahida—ventured into films with Kishore Kumar's Hum Do Daku (1967), which proved to be a box-office failure. Madhubala's death in February 1969 devastated Khan. According to Zahida, her father "never could recover from this tragedy"; he visited Madhubala's grave daily afterwards, till his own death from a heart attack in 1975.

== Public image and reception ==
In his heyday, Khan was often referred to as "Khan Saheb" in film circles, and was a subject of significant media attention due to his disputes with filmmakers and journalists, as well as his hostility toward Dilip Kumar. Author Khatija Akbar described him as "notoriously uncompromising, egocentric and difficult" and a part of the "old school of harsh disciplinarians". Music director Naushad called him a "man of principles", but also "very stubborn [who] hurt his own interests by this attitude".

Film journalist B. K. Karanjia, among the few people in the industry who were close to Khan and his family, wrote: "Ataullah Khan was a dangerous enemy, but as we were to discover, a wonderful friend. [...] I grew to like him, even admire him for his deep knowledge of cinema and for the strict discipline he was able to enforce on his daughter, which should have set an example to other freewheeling stars." Khan was credited with the creation and maintenance of Madhubala's mysterious persona, with contemporary actress Nimmi remarking that Khan's restrictions "kept her so remote that it was not just the public, even we in the film industry were in awe of her". An article in Indian Daily Mail (1955) claimed that Khan, in collaboration with film journalists, helped engineer Madhubala’s early public image by dividing the press into opposing pro- and anti-Madhubala camps. This generated publicity that was credited in helping establish her as a major star by the early 1950s, despite a mixed critical and commercial reception.

Khan was sometimes satirised in film magazines. For example, when a reader of Filmindia asked editor Baburao Patel, "Is Attaullah Khan a genius?"; Patel replied, "Yes. In creating trouble." Karanjia observed that Khan's rigid temperament curtailed Madhubala's career opportunities, notably when Frank Capra sought to offer her a Hollywood break during the 1952 International Film Festival of India; Khan is reported to have dismissed the proposal saying that "she could not eat with forks and knives". Khan's ventures into filmmaking were criticised by Dilip Kumar, who described him as "not competent" enough to produce films during the Naya Daur court case. On a later occasion, Kumar also accused Khan of diverting Madhubala's earnings into poorly executed productions.

Offering a different perspective, Khan's youngest daughter Madhur Bhushan recalled that he was "protective and inculcated discipline", but his strictness—such as forbidding film premieres and parties—stemmed from a desire to shield Madhubala from predatory men. Madhur also refuted claims that he forced Madhubala into the industry as a child, asserting that Madhubala's love for music and dance led her there naturally, and that Khan eventually became so "caught up chaperoning her" that he abandoned his own career. Madhubala rarely spoke publicly of their relationship, but once shared a childhood memory with Filmfare of "the hearty laughter of my beloved father", and recalled that despite their early poverty, "never for one moment—and I speak with complete honesty—was I left loveless and lonely."

== Filmography ==
| Year | Film | Producer | Director | Notes |
|---|---|---|---|---|
| 1950 | Pardes | Yes | No | Produced in collaborations with Prem Narayan Arora |
| 1953 | Rail Ka Dibba | Yes | No | Produced in collaborations with Prem Narayan Arora |
| 1955 | Naata | Yes | No | Produced under Madhubala Private Ltd. |
| 1960 | Mehlon Ke Khwab | Yes | No | Produced under Madhubala Private Ltd. |
| 1960 | Ghar Jawai (unreleased) | Yes | No | Produced under Madhubala Private Ltd. |
| 1962 | Pathan | Yes | Yes | Produced under Madhubala Private Ltd. |
