= Naata (film) =

1955 film by Deena Nath Madhok

- Theatrical release poster
- Directed by: Deena Nath Madhok
- Written by: Deena Nath Madhok
- Screenplay by: Deena Nath Madhok
- Story by: Deena Nath Madhok
- Produced by: Madhubala Private Ltd.
- Starring: Madhubala; Abhi Bhattacharya; Chanchal
- Music by: S. Mohinder
- Release date: December 16, 1955
- Country: India
- Language: Hindi

Naata (lit. 'Relation') is a 1955 Indian Hindi-language film directed by Deena Nath Madhok and starring Madhubala, Abhi Bhattacharya and Chanchal. The film was produced under the banner of Madhubala Private Ltd., which she had set up in 1953 along with her father, Ataullah Khan. Upon its release, Naata received mixed reviews from critics and failed at the box office.

== Plot ==
Naata was the story of a traumatized girl who relates the romance between her sister and a new post-master.

== Cast ==
- Madhubala as Tara
- Abhi Bhattacharya as Bade Babu
- Chanchal as Beena
- Gope as Shravan Kumar
- Moolchand as Harmonium Player in Qawwali
- Kanhaiyalal as Lakhibaba
- Vijayalakshmi as Seeta

== Production ==
Naata was announced in January 1955, at a time when Madhubala was facing a career setback due to continuous box office failures.

The film was Madhubala and Ataullah Khan's first venture into independent production, under their own production house, Madhubala Private Ltd. They had earlier co-produced two films (Pardes, 1950, and Rail Ka Dibba, 1953) under the banner of producer P. N. Arora.

== Soundtrack ==
The soundtrack of Naata was composed by S. Mohinder, with lyrics being penned by Tanveer Naqvi. As reported by Cinestaan, Madhubala wanted Lata Mangeshkar to lend her voice to the songs of the film, but Mangeshkar was uninterested and refused. It was then Naqvi's wife who convinced Mangeshkar to sing for Naata. The film's songs proved to be very popular among the audience.

No.	Song	Singer
1	"Dekhte Dekhte Jal Gaya Aashiyaan"	Lata Mangeshkar
2	"Lagan Lagi Hai Sajan Milan Ki"	Lata Mangeshkar
3	"Sun Sakhi Ri Tera Jal Chuka Aashiyaan"	Lata Mangeshkar
4	"Jawani Jhulti Hai Aashiqi Jhula Jhulati Hai"	Lata Mangeshkar
5	"Is Bewafa Jahan Ka Dastoor Hai Purana"	Lata Mangeshkar
6	"Mat Samajho Neer Bahaatee Hoon"	Lata Mangeshkar
7	"More Salone Kanha Gana Murali Pe Wo Gana"	Lata Mangeshkar, Sudha Malhotra
8	"Ghir Ghir Chhayi Mast Ghataye"	Lata Mangeshkar, Sudha Malhotra
9	"Dhadke Rah Rah Ke Dil Bawra"	Lata Mangeshkar, Mohammed Rafi, S. Balbir, Shamshad Begum
10	"Suno Suno Ek Nayi Kahani"	Mohammed Rafi
11	"Ek Muddat Se Diwana Di"	Mohammed Rafi, S. D. Batish

== Release ==
The film was released on 16 December 1955.

== Reception ==
=== Box office ===
Naata underperformed at the box-office, forcing Madhubala and her father to mortgage a bungalow to recover the financial losses.

=== Critical reception ===
Writing for Filmindia, Baburao Patel stated: "Naata is a dull, poor and clumsy picture. And it only seems capable of proving a headache to picture-goers and a hazard to exhibitors." A reviewer for the journal Thought criticised the screenplay and direction, while praising the cinematography. The performances of Madhubala and Chanchal were lauded, but Bhattacharya was called "wooden".

On the contrary, a critic for The Times of India described Naata as a "beautiful idyllic romantic drama". Swatantra magazine called it a "commendable venture" for "providing clean, wholesome and neat fare devoid of any cheapness and vulgarity"; the reviewer also noted "great depth and intensity" in the leading actors' work, adding that "Madhubala has never before given such an excellent performance". F. Talyarkhan of Trend magazine observed that despite the mixed reviews, Madhubala has successfully used the film into earning greater publicity for her sister, Chanchal.
