= Boy Friend (1961 film) =

1961 film

- Poster
- Directed by: Naresh Saigal
- Written by: Shivaji Rathore
- Produced by: Naresh Saigal; K. Dutta
- Starring: Madhubala; Shammi Kapoor; Nishi; Dharmendra
- Cinematography: Krishan Saigal
- Edited by: Pran Mehra
- Music by: Shankar-Jaikishan
- Release date: 1961
- Country: India
- Language: Hindi
- Box office: est. ₹5.2 million

Boy Friend is a 1961 Hindi-language romantic comedy film directed by Naresh Saigal. The film stars Madhubala, Shammi Kapoor, Nishi, and Dharmendra. Its music is composed by Shankar-Jaikishan. It revolves around Madan, who ran away from his house as a child and becomes a thief.

This film is a remake of Kismet (1943), starring Ashok Kumar along with Mumtaz Shanti, Shah Nawaz and Mehmood. Boy Friend performed moderately well the box office.

Film scholars Vijay Mishra and Sudesh Mishra identify Boy Friend as one of the "courtship dramas" through which Shammi Kapoor developed "a transferable persona around the emergent corporeal style".

== Plot ==
Eight-year-old Madan is separated from his wealthy parents, Thakur Harcharan Singh (Shivraj) and his wife Rajni. Their other son, Madan's younger brother, Sunil grows up to become a police inspector and is searching for his lost brother Madan.

Madan, who now is known by the name Shyam, has managed to survive by becoming a petty thief and has ended up in jail. On his release, he boards a train to Mumbai, where he meets Shantilal, a man he had known earlier in jail. The man, who is old and ill, asks Shyam to find his two daughters, Sangita and Sushma, whom he had abandoned due to poverty and debt years before.

When Shyam arrives in Mumbai, he begins searching for two daughters. He soon finds a young woman named Sushma (Nishi Kohli). When she drives off, he follows her in a taxi to a theater owned by Harcharan Singh, who arrives with his wife.

Sushma's elder sister Sangita is practicing dance for her stage debut in a play called "Boy Friend". The problem is that the play does not have a male lead.

While they are at the theater, Mrs. Singh's necklace is stolen by someone in the crowd. Inspector Sunil has just arrived with his men, and they start chasing the thief. Shyam sees the thief hide the necklace in a case in the sisters' car. That evening, Shyam sneaks into the sisters' house and retrieves the stolen necklace from the case. He also meets Sangita. When he relays their father's message to them, the sisters invite him to stay with them.

Shyam leaves early the next morning to return the stolen necklace to Sunil. But the Singhs' servant Sampat steals the necklace from him and sells it to a dealer.

Shyam, deciding to leave the life of crime and seek a job, sees the ad for a hero opposite Sangita in "Boy Friend" and goes to audition in front of Harcharan Singh. He is hired and the show opens in Shimla with great success. When he takes Sangita skiing, she breaks her leg - surgery is expensive, and she cannot appear on stage any longer. Harcharan sends his manager to demand that the sisters pay off their debt to him or lose their house. Shyam is furious at this, and quits his job as hero for the theater company. Without a job, the problem is finding the money that Sangita needs desperately, without resorting to his old thieving ways.

== Cast ==
Listed in the order of appearance in the opening credits:

- Madhubala as Sangeeta
- Shammi Kapoor as Madan / Shyam
- Nishi as Sushma
- Dharmendra (credited as "Dharminder") as Inspector Sunil
- Dhumal as Sampat
- Marutirao Parab (credited as "Maruti") as Sevakram
- Mahendra
- Amirbai Karnataki as Rajni Singh
- Radhey Shyam
- Sudesh
- Shivraj as Thakur Harcharan Singh

== Production ==
Boy Friend was the third and final collaboration of Madhubala and Shammi Kapoor, following Rail Ka Dibba (1953) and Naqab (1955).

After Madhubala became ill in the early 1960s, her actress-sister Chanchal finished the scenes of Boy Friend as a body double.

== Soundtrack ==
Boy Friend

Soundtrack album by Shankar–Jaikishan
- Released: 1 December 1961
- Genre: Feature film soundtrack
- Length: 33:00
- Language: Hindi
- Label: Saregama
- Producer: Shankar–Jaikishan

All music is composed by Shankar–Jaikishan.

Track listing
No.	Title	Lyrics	Singer(s)	Length
1.	"Mujhe Apna Yaar Bana Lo, Pt. 1"	Hasrat Jaipuri	Mohammed Rafi	3:57
2.	"Dekho Na Jao Jane Man, Pt. 1"	Shailendra	Subir Sen	4:20
3.	"Kyon Ji Mujhe Pehchana"	Shailendra	Mohammed Rafi	4:27
4.	"Salam Aap Ki Methi Nazar Ko Salam"	Hasrat Jaipuri	Mohammed Rafi	4:57
5.	"Dheere Chal Ae Bheegi Hawa"	Hasrat Jaipuri	Mohammed Rafi	4:21
6.	"Aaye Ga Aaye Ga"	Suky Akkal	Aarti Mukherji & Mohammed Rafi	4:14
7.	"Dekho Na Jao Jane Man, Pt. 2"	Shailendra	Lata Mangeshkar	5:03
8.	"Mujhe Apna Yaar Bana Lo, Pt. 2"	Hasrat Jaipuri	Mohammed Rafi	1:49
Total length:				33:00

== Release ==
The film was released at Liberty Cinema, Bombay, on 14 July 1961.

== Reception ==
=== Critical reception ===
A Times of India review, dated 16 July 1961, carried the headline: "Good Performances, Diverting Comedy In Boy Friend".

=== Box office ===
The film grossed ₹52 lakh at Indian box office, with nett earnings of ₹26 lakh. It was the twentieth highest-grossing Indian film of 1961.
