= Chanchal (actress) =

Indian film actress (born 1934)

- Born: Zeb Ataullah; 1934 (age 91–92); Delhi, British India
- Occupation: Actress
- Years active: 1950–1961
- Works: See below
- Spouse(s): S. K. Prabhakar (died); Ibrahim
- Father: Ataullah Khan
- Relatives: Madhubala (sister); Kishore Kumar (brother-in-law)

Zeb Ataullah (born 1934), better known by the stage name Chanchal, is a former Indian actress who appeared in Hindi-language films. She was the daughter of film producer Ataullah Khan and sister of Madhubala. Chanchal is best known for portraying Rupa in Mehboob Khan's blockbuster Mother India (1957).

Chanchal's first husband was screenwriter and director S. K. Prabhakar.

== Early life ==
Born as Zeb Ataullah in 1934 in Delhi, Chanchal was one of eleven children of Ataullah Khan and Ayesha Begum. Her parents were of Muslim Pathan descent. Chanchal's five sisters included Mumtaz, better known by her stage name Madhubala, who became one of the most celebrated Bollywood actresses of the 1950s and 1960s.

== Career ==
Chanchal appeared in four films headlined by Madhubala: Pardes (1950), Naata (1955), Mehlon Ke Khwab (1960) and Jhumroo (1961). Of these, Naata and Mehlon Ke Khwab were produced by Madhubala and Ataullah Khan. Chanchal's work in Naata was praised by critics, with a reviewer for Thought noting her "lively" performance despite poor direction. However, in Mehlon Ke Khwab she drew criticism from filmindia's Baburao Patel, who remarked that she "just fills the role of a crazy looking filly". In 1960, Chanchal finished another film produced by Khan, Ghar Jawai, opposite Kishore Kumar; however, it failed to garner any distributor interest and remained unreleased.

Chanchal's most prominent roles were in Mehboob Khan's Mother India (1957), as Sukhilala's "wild and tempestuous" daughter Rupa, and in Jis Desh Mein Ganga Behti Hai (1960), in which she played the village belle Bijli.

After Madhubala became ill in the early 1960s, Chanchal completed the filming of Boy Friend (1961) as Madhubala's body double.

== Personal life ==
Chanchal first married S. K. Prabhakar, a film director and editor, of Hindu background. Prabhakar had worked alongside Madhubala in the films Kal Hamara Hai and Do Ustad (both 1959). He died early due to a ventricular septal defect.

Chanchal later married Ibrahim. As of 2017, she resided in Dubai, United Arab Emirates.

== Filmography ==
- Pardes (1950) as Chanchal
- Nazneen (1951)
- Naata (1955) as Beena
- Teerandaz (1955)
- Mother India (1957) as Rupa
- Mehlon Ke Khwab (1960) as Bela
- Jis Desh Mein Ganga Behti Hai (1960) as Bijli
- Jhumroo (1961) as Chamki
