= Pathan (film) =

1962 Indian film

- Directed by: Ataullah Khan
- Produced by: Ataullah Khan
- Starring: Prem Nath; Mumtaz
- Music by: Fakir Mohammed; Jimmy
- Release date: 1962
- Country: India
- Language: Urdu

Pathan is a 1962 Indian Urdu-language film, directed and produced by Ataullah Khan, under the production house Madhubala Private Ltd. It stars Prem Nath in the titular role, along with Mumtaz and Iftekhar.

Pathan was the third and final production of Madhubala Private Ltd.; the other two being Naata (1955) and Mehlon Ke Khwab (1960).

== Cast ==
The actors in the film include:

- Prem Nath
- Mumtaz
- Iftekhar
- Niranjan Sharma
- Siddhu

== Production ==
According to film historian Isaq Mujawar, Ataullah Khan began working on Pathan in 1939, a couple years before his daughter, Madhubala, ventured into the film industry.

Pathan was the third (and final) completed production of Madhubala Private Ltd.; the other two being Naata (1955) and Mehlon Ke Khwab (1960). It was formally announced in September 1960, with Madhubala and Prem Nath in lead roles. She shot for only a few days, before she became sick and was replaced by Mumtaz.

== Soundtrack ==
The music was composed by Fakir Mohammed and Jimmy.

Track listing
No.	Title	Singer(s)	Length
1.	"Bombay Central Par Gori"	Mahendra Kapoor, Asha Bhosle	3:21
2.	"Jaisi Karni Hai"	S. D. Batish, Manna Dey	3:24
3.	"Soja Salone Soja"	Lata Mangeshkar	3:10
4.	"Aaja Ke Bulate Hai"	Talat Mahmood	3:03
5.	"Chand Mera Badalon Men"	Talat Mahmood	3:05
6.	"Chunri Hawa Mein Udo"	Asha Bhosle	3:15
Total length:			19:18

== Release ==
Pathan was granted a 'U' certificate by the Central Board of Film Censors on 2 November 1962, after approximately 9.33 metres of footage were deleted across several reels, including scenes related to kidnapping and dialogue concerning pregnancy.

== Reception ==
According to Madhubala's biographer Mohan Deep, Pathan was not a financial success.
