= Maan (film) =

- Directed by: Safdar Aah
- Produced by: Filmkar Pictures
- Starring: Chitra; Ajit; Gajanan Jagirdar
- Music by: Anil Biswas
- Release date: 1954
- Country: India
- Language: Hindi

Maan is a 1954 Indian Hindi-language film directed by Safdar Aah and produced under the banner of Filmkar Pictures. Its music was composed by Anil Biswas. The film stars Chitra, Ajit, Gajanan Jagirdar, Kamlesh Kumari, Kumar, and Yashodhra Katju.

Maan was planned to mark the debut of Chitra in a lead role, but it was delayed and was eventually released after P. N. Arora's Chor Bazar (1954), also starring Chitra.

== Plot ==
Bharat Singh (Kumar) is a timid man, belonging to an aristocratic Rajput family, who secretly marries a poor woman (Achala Sachdev). Intimidated by his elder, domineering brother, Inder Singh (Gajanan Jagirdar), Bharat lacks the courage to reveal his marriage and hides it out of fear of being expelled from the palace.

As the years pass, Bharat's wife is forced to work as a maid within the palace. Eventually, their daughter, Tara (Chitra), grows up and falls in love. Amid escalating tensions, the elder brother loses his sanity, leading to the destruction of the palace by fire. The film concludes with Tara and her lover (Ajit) rushing toward each other against a background of flames.

== Cast ==
- Chitra as Tara
- Ajit as Tara's lover
- Gajanan Jagirdar as Inder Singh
- Kumar as Bharat Singh
- Achala Sachdev as Bharat's wife
- Durga Khote as Inder's wife
- Kamlesh Kumari
- Yashodhra Katju

== Reception ==
Upon its release on 6 August 1954, Maan received an overwhelmingly negative review from critic Baburao Patel of Filmindia, who branded it the "most idiotic picture in recent years". Patel heavily panned Safdar Aah's direction, screenplay, and dialogue, writing that the film offers a "worse punishment than a thousand others one can get from man or nature".
