= Teerandaz (film) =

1955 film by H. S. Rawail

- Theatrical release poster
- Directed by: H. S. Rawail
- Starring: Madhubala; Ajit
- Music by: C. Ramchandra
- Release date: 1955
- Country: India
- Language: Hindi

Teerandaz is a 1955 Indian romance film directed by H. S. Rawail, and starring Madhubala and Ajit.

== Plot ==
The film follows a kind-hearted and courageous man who falls in love with a princess and wishes to marry her. After witnessing the injustices committed by her father, he becomes a fearless archer, rebels against him, and rescues people from danger.

== Cast ==
- Madhubala
- Ajit
- Jairaj
- Chandrashekhar
- Gope
- Helen
- Kuldip Kaur
- M. H. Douglas
- Yashodhara Katju
- Chanchal
- Sunder
- Randhir
- Mohana

== Songs ==
The songs were composed by C. Ramchandra, the film has 6 songs, all sung by Lata Mangeshkar.

| Song | Singer |
|---|---|
| "Ae Pardanasheen" | Lata Mangeshkar |
| "Ashqon Mein Dub Dubke" | Lata Mangeshkar |
| "Badi Bewafa Hai Udti Hawa" | Lata Mangeshkar |
| "Maine Rakh Di Nishane Pe" | Lata Mangeshkar |
| "Rehti Nahin Hamesha" | Lata Mangeshkar |
| "Yeh Haseen Sham" | Lata Mangeshkar |

== Release ==
The film premiered at Novelty Cinema of Bombay, on 18 November 1955.

== Reception ==
A Times of India review, dated 20 November 1955, carried the headline: "Teerandaz Is Fantastic But Entertaining".

Baburao Patel reviewed in Filmindia's January 1956 issue: "Teerandaz, Another Madhubala Flop – Old Nursery Tale Fails To Entertain".
