= Naunihal =

- Directed by: Raj Marbros
- Written by: S. K. Prabhakar (dialogue)
- Story by: Saawan Kumar Tak
- Produced by: Saawan Kumar Tak
- Starring: Sanjeev Kumar; Balraj Sahni; Indrani Mukherjee; Master Babloo
- Cinematography: Sadanand
- Edited by: Keshav Nanda
- Music by: Madan Mohan; Kaifi Azmi (lyrics)
- Release date: 1967
- Country: India
- Language: Hindi

Naunihal is a 1967 Indian Hindi-language drama film directed by Raj Marbros starring Sanjeev Kumar, Balraj Sahni and Indrani Mukherjee in lead roles. The film's music was composed by Madan Mohan, with lyrics by Kaifi Azmi, including the song "Meri Aawaz Suno Pyar ka Raaz Suno" (Hear my voice, hear the secret of love) sung by Mohammad Rafi. According to film and music expert Rajesh Subramanian singer Mohammed Rafi charged a token rupees three hundred for the song Meri awaaz suno. song is picturized over the funeral procession of Prime Minister of India, Jawahar Lal Nehru.

== Plot ==
The film is about orphan, Raju, who is adopted by the Principal of New Era High School in Panchgani. Later, when the growing child discovers he has no relatives, he is consoled by saying, he has a relative in Chacha Nehru, that is Jawaharlal Nehru, the Prime Minister of India, thus begins his relationship with Nehru.

== Cast ==
- Sanjeev Kumar as Rakesh
- Balraj Sahni as Principal
- Indrani Mukherjee as Uma
- Harindranath Chattopadhyay as Deranged male in Bombay
- Jagdeep as Kavi
- Asit Sen as School-teacher
- Madhavi as Kavita
- Master Babloo as Raju/Bhikhu
- Brahm Bhardwaj as Rakesh's dad
- Abhi Bhattacharya as Kind-hearted Delhi resident
- Gopal Raj Bhutani
- Laxmi Chhaya as Dancer / Singer
- Manmohan as Ustad Mansharam
- Mehmood Junior as Biloo

== Soundtrack ==
The soundtrack of the film was composed by Madan Mohan with lyrics by Kaifi Azmi.

- "Meri Aawaz Suno Pyar ka Raaz Suno" - Mohammad Rafi
- "Tumhari Zulf Ke Saye Me Shaam Kar Lunga " - Mohammad Rafi
- "Patthar Ke Bhagwaan Pighal Ja Aaj Pighalanaa Hoga" - Lata Mangeshkar
- "Ha Ha Ha Ha Chhutti Aa Gayi" - Kamal Barot, Krishna Kalle
- "Na Re Na Re Babu, Na Re Na Re Baba" - Usha Mangeshkar, Lata Mangeshkar
- "Gore Galon Ki Bhi Le Lo" - Usha Mangeshkar, Asha Bhosle
- "Rin Rin Tin Tin, Kitna Pyara Pyara Mausam Kitna Pyaara Din" - Krishna Kalle
- "Roop Ke Pujaariyo, Husn Ke Bhikaariyon" - Usha Mangeshkar, Lata Mangeshkar
