= Sahil (film) =

- Starring: Shammi Kapoor; Chitra
- Music by: Suresh Talwar
- Release date: 1959
- Country: India
- Language: Hindi

Sahil is a 1959 Bollywood film starring Shammi Kapoor and Chitra.

== Release ==
The film was released in 1959.

== Music ==
Song	Singer
"Tumhari Mohabbat Hai Ek Cheez Aisi Jise Hum"	Hemant Kumar, Asha Bhosle
"Teri Nazar Ne Mara, Tune Mujhe Pukara"	Mohammed Rafi, Asha Bhosle
"Sheetal Pawan Sanasan"	Asha Bhosle
"Dekho Ji, Humen Na Dena"	Asha Bhosle
"Mohabbat Sabko Milti Hai"	Asha Bhosle
"Meri Taqdeer Bante Hi"	Asha Bhosle
"Aayi Milan Ki Raat"	Asha Bhosle
"Aaja Re Majhdhaar Mein"	Geeta Dutt
"Khatam Kar De Dastan"	Geeta Dutt
