= Zimbo Comes To Town =

- Directed by: Nanabhai Bhatt
- Starring: Chitra, Shammi and Bhagwan
- Production company: Combine F. Traders
- Release date: 1960
- Country: India
- Language: Hindi

Zimbo Comes To Town is a 1960 Hindi-language film starring Chitra, Shammi and Bhagwan. It was made under the banner of Combine F. Traders. The film was released on 1 January 1960.

The film was dubbed into Tamil with the title Nagarathil Zimbo and released in 1961.

== Cast ==
- Chitra
- Shammi
- Bhagwan Dada
- Azad
- Habib

== Music ==
The music composed by Chitragupt (composer) and lyrics were written by Prem Dhawan

1. "Mausam Bada Rangeela" - Geeta Dutt
2. "Nazaro Ne Maara Hum Kya Kare" - Mohammed Rafi
3. "Dil Hai Tera Deewana" - Geeta Dutt
4. "Dekh Mera Dil Na Jala" - Geeta Dutt, Mohammed Rafi
5. "Thandi Hawao Kali Ghatao" - Usha Mangeshkar
6. "Itna To Bata De Aye Dil" - Lata Mangeshkar
7. "Yeh Toh Pyar Bhari Duniya Hai" - Lata Mangeshkar

=== Songlist (Tamil) ===
Music by Vijaya Bhaskar. Lyrics were penned by Kuyilan.

#	Title	Singer
1	"Nenjil Niraindha Veera"	K. Jamuna Rani
2	"Kallathone Paadi Rammandhile"	P. B. Sreenivas
3	"Endru Thaan Umathaasai"	P. Susheela
4	"Aasai Machaan Kaatthirukken"	P. B. Sreenivas & K. Jamuna Rani
5	"Kannalin Paago"	P. Susheela
6	"En Nenjam Unnai Agalaadhu"	P. Susheela
7	"Mogam Pirandhidaadhaa"	K. Jamuna Rani

=== Songlist (Telugu) ===
Music by Vijaya Bhaskar. Lyrics were penned by Sri Sri.

#	Title	Singer
1	"Sye Sye Ilanti Vela"	K. Jamuna Rani
2	"Kallathone Paadi Rammandhile"	P. B. Sreenivas
3	"Hrudayalu Mahanandhana"	P. Susheela
4	"Ganthi Pade Naa Hrudayam"	P. B. Sreenivas & K. Jamuna Rani
5	"Kadu Bhagyamidhe"	P. Susheela
6	"Challanivaadu Naa Chelikaadu"	P. Susheela
7	"Moham Phalinchekadha"	K. Jamuna Rani

Sinhala -

Singers * Latha Walpola

       * Mohideen Beg
       * Dharmadasa Walpola
