= Chor Bazar (1954 film) =

- Directed by: Prem Narayan Arora
- Starring: Sumitra Devi; Shammi Kapoor; Chitra; Om Prakash
- Release date: 1954
- Country: India
- Language: Hindi

Chor Bazar is a 1954 Indian Hindi-language film directed by Prem Narayan Arora. It stars Sumitra Devi, Shammi Kapoor, Chitra and Om Prakash. The film is an adaptation of the American film The Prince Who Was a Thief (1951).

Chor Bazar premiered in Bombay on 25 June 1954. A review in The Times of India called it an "entertaining picture".

In a 1990 interview, Chitra credited the film for providing her wider public recognition.

== Cast ==
- Sumitra Devi
- Shammi Kapoor
- Chitra
- Om Prakash
- Ram Avtar

== Production ==
Chitra was initially signed by Filmkar for a leading role in Maan (1954), but the film's production was delayed. In the meantime, she met filmmaker Prem Narayan Arora, who cast her in Chor Bazar. Released before Maan, the latter marked her film debut.
