= Zameen Ke Tare =

- Directed by: Chandulal Shah
- Starring: Agha; Master Bhagwan; Daisy Irani; Honey Irani; Krishna Kumari
- Music by: S. Mohinder
- Production company: Chandra Movies
- Distributed by: Chandra Movies
- Release date: 1960
- Country: India
- Language: Hindi

Zameen Ke Tare is a 1960 Hindi-language children's drama film directed by Chandulal Shah and starring Daisy Irani, Honey Irani, Motilal and Achala Sachdev, with music by S. Mohinder.

== Plot ==
A rich child and a poor one are both unhappy and search for God in the Himalayas.

== Cast ==
- Agha
- Master Bhagwan
- Daisy Irani
- Honey Irani
- Krishna Kumari
- Motilal
- Mumtaz
- Achala Sachdev
- Tun Tun

== Music ==
1. "Deep Gagan Ke Tum" - Sudha Malhotra, Asha Bhosle
2. "Kisi Ka Ma Na Mare Bachpan Me (Male)" - Mohammed Rafi
3. "Kisi Ka Ma Na Mare Bachpan Me (Duet)" - Mohammed Rafi, Asha Bhosle
4. "O Mere Pyaro Zameen Ke Taro" - Sudha Malhotra, Mohammed Rafi, Asha Bhosle
5. "Ye Zameen Hamari Ye Aasman Hamara" - Manna Dey, Asha Bhosle
6. "Aa Gaya Madari Le Ke Jadu Ki Pitari" - Mohammed Rafi
7. "Chunnu Patang Ko Kehta Kite" - Sudha Malhotra, Asha Bhosle
8. "Tinke Pe Tinka Chhuti" - Asha Bhosle
