= Nartaki (1963 film) =

Nartakee
- Directed by: Nitin Bose
- Written by: Dhruv Chatterji; S. K. Prabhakar
- Produced by: Mukund Trivedi
- Starring: Nanda; Sunil Dutt; Om Prakash; Agha
- Cinematography: Nana Ponkshe
- Edited by: Bimal Roy
- Music by: Ravi
- Production company: Film Bharati
- Release date: 1963
- Running time: 128 minutes
- Country: India
- Language: Hindi

Nartakee (Dancer) is a 1963 Indian social film directed by Nitin Bose. The story and screenplay were written by Dhruv Chatterji, with dialogues by S. K. Prabhakar. Produced by Mukund Trivedi for Film Bharti, its director of photography was Nana Ponkshe. Director Bimal Roy did the editing for the film. Choreography was by Sohanlal, assisted by choreographer Saroj. The music director was Ravi and the lyricist was Shakeel Badayuni. The film starred Sunil Dutt and Nanda in key roles with Om Prakash, Agha, Zeb Rehman, Pritibala and Aruna Irani.

According to Nanda, as stated in an interview to journalist Ranjan Das Gupta, "It was Nitin Bose who extracted the best from me as an actress in Nartaki. He followed Satyajit Ray's style of realistic film making and advised me to use the least amount of makeup".

The story was about a dancing girl (Nanda) brought up in the courtesan milieu, who wants to better herself with an education. She is helped amidst great societal clash, by a newly arrived Professor (Sunil Dutt).

== Plot ==
A modern reformist professor helps a tawaif(courtesan) in her endeavor to achieve a high academic level and respectability. They face open opposition and hostility by society but do not relent.

== Cast ==
- Nanda as Lakshmi
- Sunil Dutt as Professor Nirmal Kumar
- Om Prakash as Seth Jamnadas
- Agha as Azaad
- Zeb Rehman
- Pritibala as Ratna
- Aruna Irani
- Nana Palsikar as Professor Varma
- Chandrima Bhaduri as Lakshmi's Aunt, Rampiary
- Moni Chatterjee as the Principal
- Polson

== Soundtrack ==
The music was composed by Ravi, with Shakeel Badayuni's lyrics. One of the popular song from this film was "Zindagi Ke Safar Mein Akele The Ham" sung by Mohammed Rafi. A critically acclaimed song was "Zindagi Ki Uljhanon Ko Bhool Kar" sung by Asha Bhosle. The other popular song was "Aaj Duniya Badi Suhani Hai" sung by Asha Bhosle. The playback singers were Asha Bhosle, Mahendra Kapoor, Mohammed Rafi, Usha Khanna and Usha Mangeshkar.

=== Songlist ===
Title	Singer
"Hum Tumse Mohabbat Kar Baithe"	Mahendra Kapoor
"Zindagi Ke Safar Mein Akele The Ham"	Mohammed Rafi
"Zindagi Ki Uljhanon Ko Bhool Kar"	Asha Bhosle
"Aaj Duniya Badi Suhani Hai"	Asha Bhosle
"Insaan Mohabbat Mein"	Asha Bhosle
"Tumne Ankho Se Pee Ho To"	Asha Bhosle
"Agar Koi Humko Sahara Na Dega"	Usha Mangeshkar
"Pucho Koi Sawal Bacho Pucho Koi Sawal"	Usha Khanna, Usha Mangeshkar, Kamal Barot, Mohammed Rafi
