= Pyar Ka Sapna =

- Poster
- Directed by: Hrishikesh Mukherjee
- Written by: Rajender Kishan (dialogues)
- Screenplay by: S. K. Prabhakar
- Story by: Hari Zutshi
- Produced by: T. C. Dewan
- Starring: Ashok Kumar; Mala Sinha; Biswajeet
- Music by: Chitragupt
- Release date: 1968
- Country: India
- Language: Hindi

Pyar ka Sapna (transl. Dream of love) is a 1969 Bollywood film starring Ashok Kumar, Mala Sinha, Biswajeet, Helen and others.

The film was produced by T.C. Dewan and directed by Hrishikesh Mukherjee, with music by Chitragupta, lyrics and dialogues by Rajendra Krishan, story by Hari Zutshi and screenplay by S. K. Prabhakar. Actor Rajan Haksar (who played the role of Prakash Malhotra in the film) was an associate producer.

The film was shot in India and Europe.

== Plot ==
An old couple meets a traditional girl Sudha, who is going on a pilgrimage with her mother, in a train. They find her a suitable match for their son Ramesh and think she will set him right, for they believe he's too influenced by a different lifestyle (drinking and partying till late with friends).

Ramesh's father, Jwala Prasad asks Ramesh to marry Sudha before he leaves for London, or he would not provide for the expenses abroad. Ramesh agrees to the marriage, but leaves for London soon after the wedding ceremony, without even seeing his wife. He meets Gupte while traveling on a ship and becomes friends with him. He also meets Jenny in London and is friends with her, though Jenny loves him.

Shankarnath finds a distraught Sudha and teacher her English, helps her learn the ways of the world, so she can find Ramesh and win his heart. Sudha then travels to London, under Shankarnath's tutelage, and stays with his acquaintance, Mr. Malhotra. She assumes the name of Sushma, and meets Ramesh, who falls for her.

However, things become complicated when Shankarnath discovers that Jenny is his long-lost granddaughter. How Sudha and Ramesh come together when all the truths are revealed forms the story from then onwards.

== Cast ==
- Ashok Kumar as Shankarnath
- Mala Sinha as Sudha/ Sushma
- Biswajeet as Ramesh
- Helen as Jenny
- Johnny Walker as Gupte
- Durga Khote as Sudha's mother
- Rajan Haksar Mr Prakash Malhotra
- Bipin Gupta as Jwala Prasad (Ramesh's father)
- Mridula Rani as Parvati (Ramesh's mother)
- Naina as Renu (Ramesh's sister)

== Songs ==
All lyrics are written by Rajinder Krishan; all music is composed by Chitragupta.

Songs in Pyar Ka Sapna
No.	Title	Singer(s)	Length
1.	"Jee Lagta Nahi Apna In Desi Nazaro Mein"	Mohammed Rafi
2.	"Aye Meri Zindagi, Tu Nahi Ajnabi"	Mohammed Rafi, Lata Mangeshkar
3.	"Haseeno Ki Aankho Ka Tara Rahunga"	Mohammed Rafi
4.	"Night Is Lovely Dark And Cool"	Asha Bhosle
5.	"Tere Chehre Se Hatey Aankh To"	Mohammed Rafi
