= Alladin Ka Beta =

- Directed by: R. Rizvi
- Starring: Chitra; Kammo; Yashoda Katju
- Music by: S. Mohinder
- Production company: United Pictures
- Release date: 1 January 1955
- Language: Hindi

Alladin Ka Beta is a 1955 Bollywood fantasy film directed by R. Rizvi, starring Chitra and Kammo.

== Cast ==
- Yogesh Bhalla
- Chitra
- Naaz
- Marutirao Parab
- Mahipal
- Kammo
- Yashodhra Katju

== Soundtrack ==
1. "Aa Gaya Hai Waqt Maut Ka" - Mohammed Rafi
2. "Bada Rangin Fasaana Hai" - Asha Bhosle, Geeta Dutt
3. "Dil Bas Mein Nahin Dhadkan Ki Qasam" - Asha Bhosle, Mohammed Rafi
4. "Ham Pyaar Ke Maaron Ka Dushman Hai" - Asha Bhosle
5. "Main Hoon Hoor Arab Ki" - Asha Bhosle
6. "Tere Darbaar Mein Aaye Teri Sarkaar Mein Aaye" - Asha Bhosle, Mohammed Rafi
7. "Zakhmi Hain Paaon Mere Manzil Bhi Door Hai" - Asha Bhosle, Mohammed Rafi
