= Dil Tujhko Diya =

- Audio Cassette Cover
- Directed by: Rakesh Kumar
- Written by: Sayed Sultan
- Produced by: Rakesh Kumar
- Starring: Kumar Gaurav; Rati Agnihotri; Mala Sinha; Parikshit Sahni; Amrish Puri
- Music by: Rajesh Roshan
- Release date: 1987
- Country: India
- Language: Hindi

Dil Tujhko Diya ("The heart given to you") is a 1987 Indian Bollywood film directed and produced by Rakesh Kumar. It stars Kumar Gaurav and Rati Agnihotri in pivotal roles.

== Cast ==
- Kumar Gaurav as Vijay "Chhotu" "Munna" Sahni
- Rati Agnihotri as Rati
- Mala Sinha as Savitri
- Parikshat Sahni as Ajay Sahni
- Aruna Irani as Mary / Meera V. Sahni
- Suresh Oberoi as Ashok A. Sahni
- Amrish Puri as Mohla
- Sharat Saxena as Advocate Heera
- Leela Chitnis as Mrs. Sahni, Grandmother
- Gurbachchan Singh as Mahesh
- Piloo J. Wadia as Angry Teacher
- Asit Sen as Teachers' Day Speaker
- Pinchoo Kapoor as Girdharilal

== Soundtrack ==
The music is composed and written by Rajesh Roshan.

#	Song	Singer
4	"Jane Man Main Koi"	Kishore Kumar
2	"Zindagi Chand Dino Ki"	Kishore Kumar, Asha Bhosle
1	"Wada Na Tod"	Lata Mangeshkar
3	"Mast Sama, O Meri Jaan"	Asha Bhosle
5	"Dil Tukhko Diya"	Lata Mangeshkar
