= Pehchan (1970 film) =

1970 Hindi film directed by Sohanlal Kanwar

- Movie Poster
- Directed by: Sohanlal Kanwar
- Written by: S. K. Prabhakar (Dialogue)
- Produced by: Sohanlal Kanwar
- Starring: Manoj Kumar; Babita
- Music by: Shankar Jaikishan
- Release date: 1970
- Country: India
- Language: Hindi

Pehchan is a 1970 Filmfare Award winning Bollywood romance film produced and directed by Sohanlal Kanwar and story by Sachin Bhowmick. The film's dialogue were written by S. K. Prabhakar. The film stars Manoj Kumar, Babita, and Balraj Sahni with music by Shankar Jaikishan.

== Cast ==
- Manoj Kumar ... Gangaram 'Ganga' Ramkishan
- Babita Kapoor ... Barkha
- Balraj Sahni ... Ex-Firefighter
- Sailesh Kumar ... Rajiv 'Raju'
- Chand Usmani ... Champa
- Tun Tun... Ganga's prospective bride
- Brahm Bhardwaj ... Maya's dad
- Lata Bose ... Maya
- C. S. Dubey ... Sunder
- Daisy Irani ... Rani
- Kuljeet ... Rakesh
- Sulochana Latkar ... Barkha's mom
- Rajrani ... Maya's mom
- Keshav Rana ... Rakesh's employee
- Lyricist Prof. Gopaldas Neeraj..."Paise Ki Pehchan Yahan" Picturised on Neeraj.

== Music ==
The music for the film was composed by Shankar Jaikishan to lyrics by Verma Malik, Hasrat Jaipuri, Indeevar and Neeraj.

Track list

#	Title	Singer(s)	Lyricist
1	"Karle Dil Ki Baat"	Lata Mangeshkar, Mukesh	Verma Malik
2	"Gangaram Ki Samajh Men Na Aaye"	Mukesh, Suman Kalyanpur, Sharda	Verma Malik
3	"Lo Aayee Hai Jawani"	Asha Bhosle	Hasrat Jaipuri
4	"Paise Ki Pehchan Yahan"	Mohammed Rafi	Neeraj
5	"Aaya Na Humko Pyar Jatana"	Mukesh, Suman Kalyanpur	Indeevar
6	"Bas Yehi Apradh Main Har Baar"	Mukesh	Neeraj
7	"Kaun Kaun Kitne Pani Mein"	Mukesh	Verma Malik

== Awards and nominations ==
Award	Artist	Function	Result
Filmfare Award for Best Supporting Actress	Chand Usmani	Filmfare Awards 1971	Won
Filmfare Best Music Director Award	Shankar Jaikishan	Filmfare Awards	Won
Filmfare Best Lyricist Award	Verma Malik composition "Sabse Bada Nadaan"	Filmfare Awards	Won
Filmfare Best Male Playback Singer Award	Mukesh song "Sabse Bada Nadaan"	Filmfare Awards	Won
Filmfare Best Film Award	Filmnagar	Filmfare Awards	Nominated
Filmfare Best Director Award	Sohanlal Kanwar	Filmfare Awards	Nominated
Filmfare Best Lyricist Award	Neeraj composition "Bas Yehi Apradh"	Filmfare Awards	Nominated
Filmfare Best Story Award	Sachin Bhowmick	Filmfare Awards	Nominated
