= Aaj Ki Baat =

- Directed by: Leela Chitnis
- Written by: Leela Chitnis
- Produced by: Leela Chitnis
- Starring: Ajit Khan; Chitra; Bipin Gupta; Manmohan Krishna; Sunder
- Music by: Snehal Bhatkar; Raj Baldev Raj (Lyrics)
- Production company: Leela Chitnis Productions
- Release date: 1955
- Country: India
- Language: Hindi

Aaj Ki Baat is a 1955 Hindi language Bollywood film directed by Leela Chitnis which began filming in 1953 as the first film of her entity "Leela Chitnis Productions", and stars Ajit Khan, Chitra, Chitnis, Bipin Gupta, Manmohan Krishna, and Sunder.

== Cast ==
- Ajit Khan
- Leela Chitnis
- Chitra
- Bipin Gupta
- Manmohan Krishna
- Sunder

== Songs ==
1. "Kabhi Aap Hanse Kabhi Nain Hanse" - Lata Mangeshkar
2. "Mohabbat Bane Hai Wo Din Suhane" - Talat Mahmood
3. "Aaj Ki Raat Dil Me Na Rakhna" - Lata Mangeshkar
4. "Wo Chali Gham Ki Hawa" - Lata Mangeshkar
5. "Meri Nagri Me Kyo Aaya" - Asha Bhosle
6. "Jo Na Mujhse Dekhi Jaye" - Talat Mahmood
7. "Sukh Gaye Palko Par Aansu" - Talat Mahmood
8. "Pyar Ki Nazro Se Unko Dekhta Jata Hai Dil" - Talat Mahmood
