= Mehlon Ke Khwab =

1960 Indian Hindi-language comedy film

- Directed by: Muhafiz Haider
- Produced by: Madhubala; Madhubala Private Ltd.
- Starring: Madhubala; Kishore Kumar; Pradeep Kumar; Chanchal
- Music by: S. Mohinder; Anand Bakshi (lyricist)
- Release date: 9 March 1960
- Country: India
- Language: Hindi

Mehlon Ke Khwab (transl. "Dreams of riches") is a 1960 Indian Hindi-language comedy film directed by Muhafiz Haider and starring Madhubala, Kishore Kumar and Pradeep Kumar.

One of the three films produced by Madhubala under the banner of Madhubala Private Ltd., Mehlon Ke Khwab revolves around two aspiring actresses who are framed for stealing a precious necklace.

== Plot ==
The film revolves around two girls, Asha (Madhubala) and Bela (Chanchal), who round up a holiday after winning a lottery but end up being framed for stealing a precious necklace.

== Cast ==
- Pradeep Kumar as Chander
- Kishore Kumar as Rajan
- Madhubala as Asha
- Chanchal as Bela
- K. N. Singh as Motilal
- Pran as Prakash
- Om Prakash as Hotel Manager
- Leela Chitnis

== Soundtrack ==
The soundtrack of Mehlon Ke Khwab was composed by S. Mohinder and the lyrics were penned by Anand Bakshi.

1. "Ye Hai Jeevan Ki Rail" – Kishore Kumar

2. "Kamla Razia Ya Miss Mary" – Kishore Kumar, Asha Bhosle, Mahendra Kapoor

3. "Ae Jaan-e-Jigar" – Kishore Kumar, Asha Bhosle

4. "Lo Ji Bujh Gayi Bijli Pyar Ki" – Kishore Kumar

5. "Gar Tum Bura Na Mano" – Asha Bhosle, Subir Sen

6. "Is Duniya Mein" – Asha Bhosle, Geeta Dutt

7. "Piyo Piyo Nazar Pilati Hai" – Asha Bhosle

== Reception ==
A critic for The Times of India described the film as a "breezy comedy".

Editor Baburao Patel of filmindia called it "one of the most rotten, dreary and empty headed pictures ever produced".

According to Madhubala's biographer Mohan Deep, Mehlon Ke Khwab was unsuccessful at the box office.
