= Chitra (Hindi actress) =

Indian actress (1937–2006)

- Born: Afsar Unissa Begum; 17 May 1937
- Died: 11 January 2006 (aged 68)
- Occupation: Actress
- Years active: 1954–1969; 1983
- Known for: Chor Bazar; Zimbo (1958); Zimbo Comes To Town (1960)
- Relatives: Nigar Sultana (aunt)

Afsar Unissa Begum (17 May 1937 – 11 January 2006), better known by the screen name Chitra, was an Indian actress who worked in Hindi cinema. In 1990, The Illustrated Weekly of India hailed her as "the empress of the B-grade jungle dramas, costume pictures and socials of yore".

Predominantly active during the 1950s and 1960s, Chitra appeared in more than 100 Hindi films. She gained public recognition with her roles in Chor Bazar (1954), Alladin Ka Beta (1955), and Khazanchi (1958). Following the success of the jungle film Zimbo (1958), she was frequently cast opposite Azad in Tarzan films such as Zimbo Comes To Town (1960), Tarzan Aur Jadugar (1963) and Tarzan And The Circus (1965).

== Early life ==
Chitra was born as Afsar Unissa Begum on 17 May 1937, in Hyderabad, British India. Her aunt, Nigar Sultana, became a prominent actress in Hindi films in the late 1940s. Chitra's elder sister, Yusuf Unnisa Begum, also entered the film industry under the screen name Paras.

== Career ==
Chitra was fond of films from a young age and followed in the footsteps of her aunt and elder sister by entering the film industry. Her first film as a lead actress was intended to be Maan (1954), but P. N. Arora's comedy film Chor Bazar (1954), co-starring Shammi Kapoor, was released earlier and marked her debut. Reviewing the film negatively, critic V. P. Sathe nevertheless praised Chitra for providing "some lively moments in the film". She later recalled that Chor Bazar was popular and brought her immediate attention from B-movie filmmakers.

She subsequently appeared opposite Mahipal in Rafiq Rizvi's fantasy film Alladin Ka Beta (1955), which received unenthusiastic reviews. She continued to appear alongside Mahipal in Hatimtai Ki Beti (1955) and Lal-E-Yaman (1956), and alongside Daljeet in Baghdad Ka Chor (1955) and Alam Ara (1956). For her performance opposite Pradeep Kumar in Hoor-e-Arab (1956), she was described as a "promising artiste" in a review by The Times of India. She then played Geeta Mohan in Arora's crime drama Khazanchi (1958), which also starred Rajendra Kumar, Shyama, and Balraj Sahni.

Chitra's breakthrough came with her leading role opposite Azad in Homi Wadia's action film Zimbo (1958), which is regarded as India's first colour "jungle film". According to Cinemaazi, the box-office success of Zimbo established Chitra as the "action queen" of B-grade Hindi cinema. Following Zimbo, she was frequently cast as Jane Porter in Tarzan films such as Zimbo Comes To Town (1960), Tarzan Aur Jadugar (1963) and Tarzan And The Circus (1965). According to film historian Dhruv Somani, the pair of Azad and Chitra featured in the "maximum number of our Tarzan movies".

With her growing popularity, Chitra expanded her repertoire, appearing opposite some mainstream leading actors of the era, including Feroz Khan, who debuted alongside her in Reporter Raju (1962). In 1965, she played a triple role in the successful fantasy film Noor Mahal, which she later described as a "high point" of her career.

Chitra's career began to decline in the late 1960s, as she sought more substantial roles and turned down several offers for B-films. She attempted to establish herself in mainstream cinema with Bahurupee (1969), in which she starred opposite newcomer Dheeraj Kumar. The film, however, was unsuccessful at the box office. Chitra did not appear in another film until 1983, when she made a minor appearance in Kamal Amrohi's period drama Razia Sultan, her final film.

== Personal life and death ==
In a 1990 interview, Chitra revealed that she had remained unmarried following a failed relationship. She had no children. Chitra died on 11 January 2006 following a prolonged illness. Despite her previous remarks, a report by the Hindustan Times stated that had a husband at the time of her death.

== Selected filmography ==
Year	Title	Role	Notes	Ref.
1954	Chor Bazar			
1954	Maan	Tara		
1955	Aaj Ki Baat			
1955	Alladin Ka Beta			
1955	Baghdad Ka Chor			
1955	Hatimtai Ki Beti	Roshanan		
1955	Hoor-e-Arab			
1956	Alam Ara			
1956	Baghi Sardar			
1956	Lal-E-Yaman			
1956	Zindagi Ke Mele			
1958	Kabhi Andhera Kabhi Ujala			
1958	Khazanchi	Geeta Mohan		
1958	Sair-e-Paristan			
1958	Zimbo	Leela Devi		
1959	O Tera Kya Kehna			
1959	Sahil			
1960	Zimbo Comes To Town	Leela Devi		
1961	Saaya			
1962	Reporter Raju			
1963	Patal Nagri			
1963	Tarzan Aur Jadugar	Jane Porter		
1964	Magic Carpet	Banafsha		
1965	Baghi Haseena			
1965	Noor Mahal			
1965	Tarzan And The Circus	Jane Porter		
1969	Bahurupee			
1983	Razia Sultan			
