= S. Mohinder =

Indian composer (1925–2020)

- Born: 24 February 1925; Sargodha District, Punjab, British India
- Died: 6 September 2020 (aged 95)
- Occupation: Film music composer
- Awards: National Film Award for 'Best Music Director' of the year (1969)

Bakshi Mohinder Singh Sarna (24 February 1925 – 6 September 2020), known professionally as S. Mohinder, was an Indian music composer.

== Early life ==
He was born in Sillanwali Tehsil, Sargodha District in 1925. Mohinder's father Bakhsi Sujan Singh was a sub-inspector in the police forces. Later, his father also served in Sahiwal (old name Montgomery area). He was a student of a famous musician at that time in Sahiwal named Pandat Ratan Moorti who lived at Babay Wala Chowk.

His father Bakshi Sujan Singh was transferred and the family moved to a comparatively larger city Lyallpur, British India now Faisalabad, in Pakistan, where young Mohinder, in the 1930s, started an apprenticeship with an accomplished Sikh religious vocalist Sant Sujan Singh.

He honed his skills for several years in accordance with classical music in the tutelage of Sant Sujan Singh. Initially, he strived to be a singer. Later, his family moved to Sheikhupura (now in Pakistan), close to Nankana Sahib, the birthplace of the founder of Sikhism (Guru Nanak).

He later received his further training in classical music from Sikh religious musician Bhai Samund Singh. Frequent transfers of his father kept the family on the move. Since Mohinder's education suffered, his father enrolled him in Khalsa High School during the 1940s in the village Kairon in Amritsar. S. Mohinder was fluent both in Urdu and Punjabi languages. It took him some time to learn the Hindi language.

== Career ==
In 1947, the rest of his family moved to East Punjab in India. The love for classical music brought S. Mohinder to Benares, the Mecca of Indian Classical Music. After some years of grooming, S. Mohinder moved to Mumbai, the centre of the film industry. His first successful film was Nili (1950), which was a musical hit but the film was a disaster at the box office.

Mohinder Singh eventually managed to become a music director in Filmistan Studio, which then was making films. He composed music for them for almost half a decade. In the early 1980s, he migrated the US, often attending meetings with local music enthusiasts to offer his insights into the 1990s and early 2000s. He returned to Mumbai, India in 2013.

According to his daughter Nareen Chopra, he was helped in his career development by Suraiya, film producer and director K. Asif, S. Mukherjee and Madhubala. His daughter also added that he was close to Madhubala's family and Prithviraj Kapoor.

== Death ==
He died in Mumbai at the age of 95 on 6 September 2020.

== Awards ==
- National Film Award as 'Best Music Director of the year' (1969) for film Nanak Nam Jahaz Hai (1969), a Punjabi-language film.

== Filmography ==
Unreleased films – Geet Aur Aansoo (1940s), Do Dost (1950s), Maa Di Godh (Punjabi), 1970s

- Sehra (1948)
- Jeevan Saathi (1949)
- Nili (1950)
- Shrimati Ji (1952) - music an background music also
- Veer Arjun (1952)
- Bahadur (1953)
- Papi (1953)
- Naata (1955)
- Alladin Ka Beta (1955)
- Sau Ka Note (1955)
- Shahzaada (1955)
- Sultaan-E-Alam (1956)
- Shirin Farhad (1956)
- Karwan (1956)
- Paataal Pari (1957)
- Sun To Le Hasina (1958)
- Naya Paisa (1958)
- Khoobsurat Dhoka (1959)
- Pardesi Dhola (1959) (Punjabi movie as a producer & music director)
- Bhagwaan Aur Shaitaan (1959)
- Do Dost (1960)
- Ek Ladki Saat Ladke (1961 with Vinod)
- Zameen Ke Tare (1960)
- Mehlon Ke Khwab (1960)
- Jai Bhavaani (1961)
- Baanke Saawariya (1962)
- Reporter Raju (1962)
- Zarak Khan (1963)
- Captain Sheroo (1963)
- Sarfarosh (1964)
- Bekhabar (1965)
- Sunehre Kadam (1966)
- Professor-X (1966)
- Picnic (1966)
- Gonind Darshan (1967) Documentary about Guru Gobind Singh Ji 300 years parkash purab
- Nanak Nam Jahaz Hai (1969) (He won the National Film Award for this Punjabi-language movie)
- Man Jeete Jag Jeet (1973) (Punjabi movie)
- Dukh Bhanjan Tera Naam (1974) Punjabi movie
- Shabads And Shlokas Of Guru Tegh Bahadur Singh Ji Vol 1

Album had Various Artistes got 10 Tracks (1975)

- SHABAD GURBANI (1975) private album for singer KANWAL SIDHU
- Sis Ganj (1975) Guru Teg Bahadur - Hind Di Chadar) private album with Mahendra Kapoor, Manna Dey, S. Mohinder, Ragi Tirlochan Grewal
- Teri Meri Ik Jindri (1975)
- Papi Tarey Anek (1976) Punjabi movie
- Santo Banto (1976) Punjabi movie
- Laadli (1978) Punjabi movie
- Sukhi Pariwar (1979) Punjabi movie
- Fauji Chacha (1980) Punjabi movie
- Dahej (1981) Punjabi movie
- Shabads And Shlokas Of Guru Tegh Bahadur Singh Ji Vol. 2 private album with Mohammed Rafi, Neelam Sahni

Label on Saregama Releasing on 06 Jan, (1985)

- Sandli (1985)
- Maula Jatt (1990) (Punjabi movie)
