= Reporter Raju =

- Directed by: Dwarka Khosla
- Starring: Feroz Khan; Chitra
- Music by: S. Mohinder
- Release date: 1962
- Country: India
- Language: Hindi

Reporter Raju is a 1962 Indian Hindi-language thriller film directed by Dwarka Khosla and produced under the banner of Wadia Movietone. It stars Feroz Khan in one of his earliest leading roles. It also stars Chitra, Sulochana Chatterjee, and Manorama.

== Cast ==
- Feroz Khan
- Chitra
- Sulochana Chatterjee
- Manorama

== Themes and influences ==
Film critic Khalid Mohamed noted that the film incorporates elements inspired by Alfred Hitchcock's films.

== Soundtrack ==
The soundtrack of Reporter Raju was composed by S. Mohinder. The yodeling in one of its song, "Chale Ho Kahaan Kaho", was executed by singer and assistant music director Surinder Kohli, even though the track is officially credited entirely to Mohammed Rafi.
