= Khazanchi (1958 film) =

- Directed by: Prem Narayan Arora
- Produced by: M. L. Arora
- Starring: Balraj Sahni; Rajendra Kumar; Shyama
- Music by: Madan Mohan
- Release date: 1958
- Country: India
- Language: Hindi

Khazanchi (Hindi: ख़ज़ांची) is a 1958 Bollywood film, directed by Prem Narayan Arora, starring Balraj Sahni in the title role and Rajendra Kumar, Shyama are in the other lead roles.

== Cast ==
- Balraj Sahni as Radhe Mohan (Khazanchi), Harish and Geeta's father
- Rajendra Kumar as Harish Mohan
- Shyama as Usha
- Chitra as Geeta Mohan
- Anwar Hussain as Lokenath "Loku"
- S. N. Banerjee as Rai Bahadur, Usha's father
- Manorama as Ichchapuran Devi, Usha's stepmother
- Shammi as Roma
- Helen as Dancer
- Minoo Mumtaz as Courtesan Najjo
- Suresh as Mohan (uncredited; no dialogue)

== Music ==
The music is composed by Madan Mohan and lyrics written by Rajinder Krishan, with playback singers Asha Bhosle and Mohammed Rafi.

Song	Singer
"Tum Samne Aakar Jis Dam Jalwa Sa Dikha Jaate Ho"	Mohammed Rafi, Asha Bhosle
"Meri Akhiyon Mein Jhoome"	Asha Bhosle
"Aankhon Aankhon Mein"	Asha Bhosle
"Zulam Leke Aaya"	Asha Bhosle
"Aayi Diwali Aayi"	Asha Bhosle
"Talam Tol Kare"	Asha Bhosle
