= Nazneen (film) =

1951 film by N.K. Ziree

- Directed by: N. K. Ziree
- Written by: Mohammed Sadiq
- Produced by: Prem Narayan Arora
- Starring: Madhubala; Nasir Khan
- Music by: Ghulam Mohammad
- Production company: All India Pictures
- Distributed by: All India Pictures
- Release date: 1951
- Country: India
- Language: Hindi

Nazneen is a 1951 Indian film starring Nasir Khan, Jayant and Madhubala who also presented the film. It was the acting debut film of both Jayant's sons Imtiaz Khan and Amjad Khan, they appeared as child artists in this film. The film itself was directed by Jayant's brother, N. K. Ziree. Madhubala's sister Chanchal also appeared in this film.

== Plot ==
It starts with a young Kundan, who was often absorbed in daydreaming. He would often be thinking and thinking or planning in his imagination of his sweet heart. Youth sees impossible things with a silver lining. But his parents expected differently from him. So they decided to end all this nonsense and fixed up a marriage with the girl to whom he was betrothed in childhood. In order to avoid his marriage, Kundan comes over to Bombay with the help of his friend Ghunchoo. Kundan and Ghunchoo, while in Bombay, soon meet Professor Dho, who, after putting them a number of interesting questions, agrees to give them jobs. Professor Dho was a very famous sculptor; these days he was engaged in making a statue of a queen of beauty, in fact a model damsel, whom he would name Nazneen. Its exhibition was shortly to be inaugurated for prominent citizens and public. Kundan, who was entrusted with the job of looking after this statue, found himself in a new world, as in the twinkling of an eye the statue changed into a queen of beauty, a lovely woman in real and blood. He was overjoyed, for he thought that his dreams had changed in reality. At the time of the exhibition, Professor Dho and the public thought that they were fooled when they found the statue missing. On inquiry from Kundan, he related a story, which Professor Dho and Ghunchoo thought to be a riddle. Miss Chocolate tried to persuade him to flash out the truth. Nobody would believe what he described about "Nazneen". He was considered to be a lunatic and forced to be admitted to the lunatic asylum. His love for Nazneen did not end even in the asylum, and soon he found himself in the court to say something of the charges levelled against him. He escaped the court room and came to the house to meet his Nazneen. To his utter disappointment, he found the statue in its original place. There was no living beauty but a statue with tears in its eyes. His heart was broken.

== Cast ==
The main cast of the film included:

- Madhubala as Nazneen
- Nasir Khan as Kundan
- Jayant
- Agha as Ghunchoo
- Chanchal
- Om Prakash as Professor Dho
- Ram Avtar
- Cuckoo as Miss Chocolate
- Pratima Devi
- Imtiaz Khan
- Amjad Khan
- Kathana

== Soundtrack ==
While Ghulam Mohammed provided the music direction, the lyrics were penned by Shakeel Badayuni.

Song	Singer(s)
"Chandni Raaton Mein Jis Dum..."	Talat Mahmood
"Aa Gaye Dil Mein Tum..." (Part 1)	Lata Mangeshkar
"O Zindagi Ke Maalik, Tera Hi Aasra Hai..."	Lata Mangeshkar
"Parwane Ho Parwane Do Din Ki Jawani Hai..."	Lata Mangeshkar
"Aa Gaye Dil Mein Tum..." (Part 2)	Shamshad Begum
"Baadal Aaye Rimjhim Rimjhim..."	Shamshad Begum
"Dulha Banega Albela..."	Shamshad Begum
"Nakhre Dikhla Ke Dil Le Liya..."	Shamshad Begum & Mohammed Rafi

== Reception ==
The film was a commercial hit, grossing ₹65 lakh against a budget of ₹15 lakh; thus becoming the twelfth highest earning film of 1951.

Nazneen was one of the most popular pictures Madhubala made in her early career. The film was much appreciated by her fans. One of them died in East Pakistan swooning, "Nazneen is with me."
