= Ishaara (1964 film) =

- Poster
- Directed by: K. Amarnath
- Starring: Joy Mukherjee; Vyjayanthimala
- Music by: Kalyanji-Anandji
- Release date: 1964
- Country: India
- Language: Hindi

Ishaara is a 1964 Indian Hindi-language film directed by K. Amarnath. It stars Joy Mukherjee, Vyjayanthimala and Pran.

== Plot ==
Sent to Boarding School at a very young age, Mala returns home to Delhi after 10 years to find that everything has changed. Her widowed mom has remarried a wealthy man named Khem Chand, and all of the family, which consists of a sister, Shashi; a brother, Deep, and a younger brother, Munna, live in a palatial house. Khem Chand does business illicitly as an insurance broker when the government decides to nationalize insurance companies, he is arrested and sentenced to 7 years in jail. His entire family is thrown out on the street, where they are taken care of by Vijay, a poor stage artist, who has fallen in love with Mala, who also has a place in her heart for him. However, circumstances keep the two lovers apart, so much so that Mala is forced to refuse Vijay's help, relocate further away from him, and join a dance troupe.

== Cast ==
- Joy Mukherjee as Vijay
- Vyjayanthimala as Mala
- Pran as Suresh Das
- Jayant as Khem Chand
- Shammi as Muniya
- Subbiraj as Deep
- Murad as Dwarka Das
- Praveen Paul as Dwarka's wife
- Sajjan as Ramu
- Azra as Shashi
- Pratima Devi as Khem Chand's wife
- Agha as Chuniya
- Harbans Darshan Arora as Police Inspector
- Birbal as a Man, Deep's fight with
- Paul Sharma as Suresh's goon
- Mridula Rani as Vijay's mother
- Ruby Mayor as Textile Emporium's customer
- Kesari as Shashi K. Lalla
- Hari Shivdasani as Madan Rais
- Raja Amrohi as Munna
- Brahm Bhardwaj as Textile Emporium Manager

== Music ==
All songs were written by Majrooh Sultanpuri.

- "Hey Abdullah Nagin Wala Aa Gaya" - Lata Mangeshkar, Mohammed Rafi
- "Dil Bekarar Sa Hai" (male) - Mohammed Rafi
- "Dil Bekarar Sa Hai" (female) - Lata Mangeshkar
- "Chal Mere Dil Lahrake Chal" - Mukesh
- "Chori Ho Gayi Raat Nayan Ki Nindiya" - Mahendra Kapoor, Lata Mangeshkar
- "Tose Naina Laga Ke Mai Hai" - Lata Mangeshkar
- "Nahin Jahaan Mein Nadan Koi" - Mahendra Kapoor, Lata Mangeshkar
