= Baaje Ghungroo =

1962 film

- Directed by: S. Srivastava
- Starring: Nalini Chonkar; Leela Mishra; Jugal Kishore
- Music by: Dhaniram
- Release date: 1962
- Language: Hindi

Baaje Ghungroo is a 1962 Hindi film.

== Soundtrack ==
1. "Aankhe Dhundha Rahi Hain Tumko" - N/A
2. "Baaje Ghungroo Chhana Chhan Chhan" - Mohammed Rafi, Sabita Chowdhury, Seeta Agarwal
3. "Be-Sahaara Chodkar O Janewaale" - N/A
4. "Jaane De Sainya Na Bahiya Marod" - N/A
5. "Sari Raat Jagi" - Asha Bhosle
6. "Preet Bhai Aisi" - Asha Bhosle
7. "Jara Murali Baja De Mere Shyam" - Sabita Chowdhury
