= Kal Hamara Hai =

1959 film directed by S.K. Prabhakar

- Directed by: S. K. Prabhakar
- Produced by: K. Amarnath
- Starring: Madhubala; Bharat Bhushan
- Music by: Chitragupta; Gajanan
- Production company: Ranjit Studios
- Release date: 24 April 1959
- Running time: 126 minutes
- Country: India
- Language: Hindi

Kal Hamara Hai (transl. "Tomorrow is Ours") is a 1959 Bollywood social drama film directed by S. K. Prabhakar and starring Madhubala in dual role with Bharat Bhushan. The plot revolves around two lookalike sisters Madhu and Bela who fall for a single man named Bharat.

== Plot ==
Bharat, a young man, works as a puppet for greedy and wealthy Seth Hiralal. Hiralal once asks him to kill an old man who knows the truth of Hiralal's black marketing and show this as an accident, to which Bharat refuses. However, Hiralal himself knocks the old man down with his car and blames Bharat for this. Bharat is imprisoned but soon runs away from the jail with a thought of revenge. When he is about to murder Hiralal for destroying his life, Bharat meets a girl who is also hidden behind a pillar in order to steal something from Hiralal's house. She introduces herself as Madhu, and tells him that the purpose for stealing is she does not have money to buy medicines for her father, who met with a fatal accident just few days ago.

Bharat decides to help Madhu and buys her medicine for her father. To his shock, her father is no one other than the old man whom Hiralal had asked to kill. Madhu's father is somehow not able to recognise Bharat.

Madhu has a sister named Bela, who looks just like her and is sent to study in Delhi. One day, she sends a letter to Madhu telling her that she left the college as she was not able to pay the fees, and moreover, she is not interested in studies anymore. She began working as a dancer in a club to earn money. Hiralal notices Bela while she is dancing and tries to buy her. However, Bela is beauty-with-brains; she backs off Hiralal's plan, which infuriates him.

On the other hand, in spite of no relation, Bharat begins helping Madhu financially and they fall in love. Madhu asks him to bring Bela back home and he promises her the same.

Bharat goes to Delhi at once and tries to make Bela understand and succeeds. Bela, too like her sister, is impressed by his personality and falls for him. When Bela learns that Madhu also loves him, she leaves her sister's house; on her way is murdered by an infuriated Hiralal.

Bharat is framed by Hiralal for murdering Bela. During the courtroom drama when Bharat is tried, it is revealed that he is the son of none other than Hiralal; his jealous relative had kidnapped him when he was an infant.

As Bharat is imprisoned, Hiralal reveals to the court that Bela was killed by him. He also tells the court that throughout his life he earned money by wrong ways. He framed Bharat several times; he is regretting now.

In the end, Bharat reunites with his family, marries Madhu and Hiralal is jailed.

== Cast ==
- Madhubala as Madhu / Bela (double role)
- Bharat Bhushan as Bharat
- Jayant as Seth Hiralal
- Leela Chitnis as Hiralal's wife
- Murad as Lawyer
- Bhram Bhardwaj as Bharat's friend
- Hari Shivdasani as Inspector Umesh Mehra
- Nazir Kashmiri as Doctor

== Soundtrack ==
The soundtrack of Kal Hamara Hai was composed by Chitragupta and the lyrics were penned by Shailendra and Majrooh Sultanpuri.

Kal Hamara Hai

Soundtrack album by Chitragupta
- Released: December 31, 1958
- Genre: Feature film soundtrack
- Length: 16:00
- Language: Hindi
- Label: Saregama
- Producer: Chitragupta

Songs
No.	Title	Lyrics	Singer(s)	Length
1.	"Aa Meri Taal Par Naach"	Majrooh Sultanpuri	Geeta Dutt	3:24
2.	"Aise Na Dekho Rasiya"	Shailendra	Asha Bhosle	3:14
3.	"Ghar Se To Kat Chuka Hai Pata"	Majrooh Sultanpuri	Mohammed Rafi	3:10
4.	"Jhunke Hain Badal"	Majrooh Sultanpuri	Asha Bhosle & Mohammed Rafi	3:30
5.	"Kal Humara Hai"	Shailendra	Mohammed Rafi & Sudha Malhotra	3:10
Total length:				16:00

== Reception ==
According to a report by Filmindia, Kal Hamara Hai opened to thronged houses and attracted "appreciative crowds" since its theatrical release on 24 April 1959. The soundtrack was well received.

In a review published on 3 May 1959, The Times of India dismissed the film as "inconsequential".

K. B. Goel of Thought disliked Kal Hamara Hai for its familiar tricks and story, but singled out Madhubala for her performance:

"To suit the talents of Madhubala, the story writer and director, Mr. S. K. Prabhakar, tailors for her the dual role of two sisters – one peaceful, the other seductive ... As the peaceful, homely elder sister, Madhubala is beautiful. In the other role she gives to the love scenes a sensuality rare in Indian films. In either role she is a big situation by herself."

Khatija Akbar said in 1997 that "Kal Hamara Hai remained lacklustre, in spite of Madhubala's heroic efforts to save the movie. Playing twins, she turned in a polished performance, particularly in the role of the misguided "other" sister."

On the contrary, K. Amarnath's daughter wrote: "Though Kal Hamara Hai did not do very well at the box-office, it is on the top of my list as one of my most favourite movies produced by my father. In my opinion, it was made before its time. It is a very thought-provoking socially conscious movie."

== Trivia ==
- The scene where Bela (Madhubala) gives an autograph to a man was reused in 1962 film Half Ticket.
- Actor Manoj Kumar was a frequent visitor of K. Amarnath on the sets of Kal Hamara Hai. Later Kumar had admitted that the hero of Upkar (1967) was inspired from the hero of Kal Hamara Hai.
