= Sindbad Alibaba and Aladdin =

Sinbad Alibaba and Aladdin
- Directed by: Prem Narayan Arora
- Starring: Helen; Pradeep Kumar; Agha
- Music by: Ravi
- Release date: 1965

Sindbad Alibaba and Aladdin is a 1965 Indian Hindi-language action film by Prem Narayan Arora starring Pradeep Kumar, Agha and Bhagwan as the titular characters respectively from the Arabian Nights.

== Cast ==
- Pradeep Kumar as Sindbad
- Agha as Ali Baba
- Bhagwan as Aladdin
- S Bannerji
- Ram Awtar
- Ulhas
- Helen

== Soundtrack ==
#	Song	Singer
6	"Mera Naam Jinny"	Asha Bhosle
3	"Ye Hasin Nazare Muntzil Hai Sare"	Asha Bhosle
4	"Aaj Hai Gulfam Se Bhi Badhkar Teri Shan"	Asha Bhosle
1	"Kya Jawan Raat Hai Baharo Ki"	Mohammed Rafi, Asha Bhosle
2	"Layi Bhar Ke Muhabbat Ke Jaam"	Asha Bhosle, Usha Mangeshkar
5	"Lai Lai Maula Lai Lai"	Meenu Purushottam, Usha Mangeshkar, Asha Bhosle
