= Leela Chitnis =

Indian actress (1909–2003)

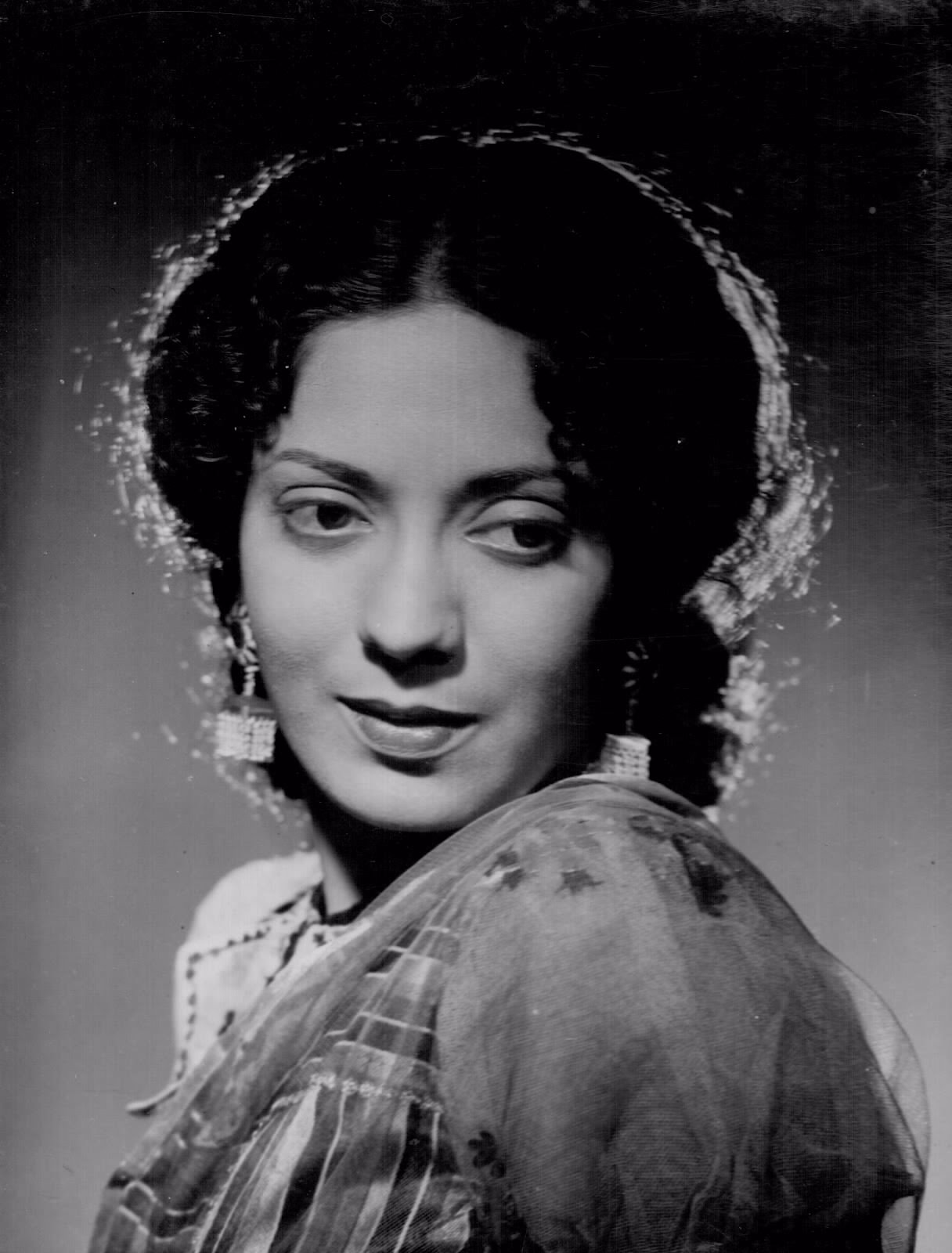
- Born: Leela Nagarkar; 9 September 1909; Dharwad, Bombay Presidency, British India (present-day Karnataka, India)
- Died: 14 July 2003 (aged 93); Danbury, Connecticut, U.S.
- Occupations: Film actor, theatre actor
- Years active: 1930s-1980s
- Spouse: Gajanan Yashwant Chitnis

Leela Chitnis (née Nagarkar; 9 September 1909 – 14 July 2003) was an Indian actress in the Indian film industry, active from the 1930s to the 1980s. In her early years she starred as a romantic lead, but she is best remembered for her later roles playing a virtuous and upright mother to leading stars.

== Early life ==
She was born in a Marathi-speaking Brahmin family, in Dharwad, Karnataka. Her father was an English literature professor. With a B.A. degree, she was one of the first educated film actresses. After graduation she joined Natyamanwantar, a progressive theater group that produced plays in her native Marathi language. The group's works were greatly influenced by Henrik Ibsen, George Bernard Shaw and Konstantin Stanislavski. With the theatre group, Leela played the lead role in a series of comedies and tragedies and even founded her own repertory.

== Career ==
Chitnis' early stage work included comedy Usna Navra (1934) and with her own film group Udyacha Sansar. She started acting to support her four children. She started as an extra and went on to stunt films.

Chitnis in the now-lost film Chaaya (1936)

Chitnis (r), dressed in a male attire, with Kokila (l) in Gentleman Daku (1937)

In Gentleman Daku ("Gentleman Thief") in 1937, Chitnis played a polished crook dressed in male apparel and was publicised in the Times of India as the first graduate society-lady from Maharashtra. By then she had already made her first major mark as an actress on the silver screen. Chitnis worked at Prabhat Pictures, Pune and Ranjit Movietone before going on to be the leading lady in Bombay Talkies.

Specialising in controversial films that challenged accepted societal norms, especially those regarding marriage and the invidious caste system, Bombay Talkies was having limited luck at the box office. But it bounced back with Kangan ("Bangles", 1939), which introduced Chitnis playing the lead role as the adopted daughter of a Hindu priest in love with the son of a local landlord who opposes the relationship and threatens the holy man. Her love, however, stands up to his father's prejudices, an unusual theme for the time, but one that appealed to the public imagination enough to ensure it success at the box office.

With Kangan's success, Leela replaced Bombay Talkies' leading lady Devika Rani. Leela made a was a partner with Devika Rani's leading man Ashok Kumar for a series of box-office hits such as Azad (Free, 1940), Bandhan (Ties, 1940) and Jhoola ("Swing", 1941) that broadly dealt with societal issues. In 1941, Chitnis, became the first Indian film star to endorse the Lux soap brand.

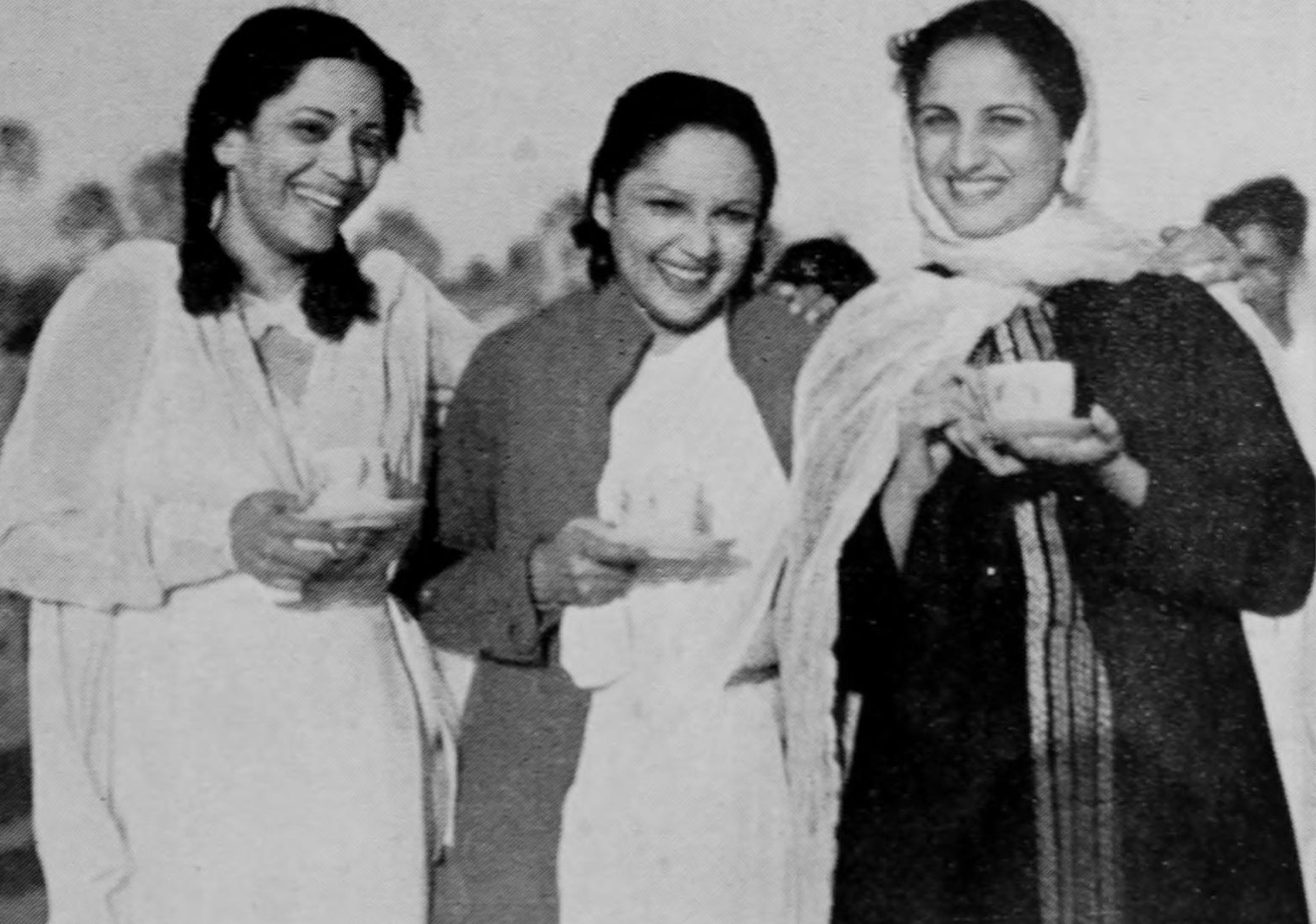
Chitnis with two other leading ladies of the era: Devika Rani (mid) and Neena (right)

By the mid-1940s her career went downhill as the new leading ladies came in. Leela accepted the reality and in 1948 entered the next, and perhaps most renowned, phase of her career in Shaheed ("Martyr"). Cast as the hero's suffering, ailing mother, she played this role to perfection. For 22 years, Chitnis played the mother of the later leading men including Dilip Kumar, often playing an ailing mother or a mother going through hardships and struggling to bring up her offspring. In fact she created the archetype of the Hindi Film mother, which was continued by later actresses. Leela's maternal histrionics were portrayed in a range of films such as Awaara (The Vagabond, 1951), Ganga Jumna (The Confluence, 1961) and, in 1965, the runaway success Guide, based on the award-winning novel of the same name by R.K. Narayan. She was busy through the 1970s, but cut down her appearances thereafter before taking the final curtain call in Dil Tujhko Diya ("I Give My Heart to You") in 1985. She then emigrated to the United States in the late 1980s to join her children. She died in Danbury, Connecticut at a nursing home, at the age of 94.

Leela also briefly dabbled in movie-making, producing Kisise Na Kehna ("Don't Tell Anybody", 1942) and directing Aaj ki Baat ("The Talk of Today", 1955). She also wrote and directed a stage adaptation of Somerset Maugham's Sacred Flame and published her autobiography, Chanderi Duniyet, in 1981.

== Personal life ==
Chitnis belonged to the Brahmin caste. However, her father adhered to Brahmo Samaj, a religious movement that rejected caste.

At the age of 15 or 16, she married Dr. Gajanan Yeshwant Chitnis, a gentleman of her own community who was somewhat older than her, in a match arranged by their parents in the usual Indian way. Dr. Chitnis was a qualified medical doctor. The couple were quickly had four children, all boys. They supported India's struggle for independence from Britain and once risked arrest by harbouring M.N.Roy, a famous Marxist freedom fighter, in their house. After she divorced her husband, she worked as a school teacher before turning to acting.

She had four sons Manavendra (Meena), Vijaykumar, Ajitkumar and Raj. She lived with her eldest son in Connecticut in United States, until her death. She had three grandchildren then.

== Filmography ==
=== Actress ===
- Shri Satyanarayan (1935)
- Dhuwandhar (1935)
- Chhaya (1936) - Chhaya
- Wahan (1937) - Princess Jayanti
- Insaaf (1937)
- Gentleman Daku (1937)
- Master Man (1938)
- Raja Gopichand (1938)
- Jailor (1938) as Kanwal
- Chhote Sarkar (1938)
- Sant Tulsidas (1939) - Ratnavali
- Kangan (1939) - Radha
- Chhotisi Duniya (1939)
- Ghar Ki Rani (1940) - Arundhati
- Bandhan (1940) - Beena
- Azad (1940)
- Ardhangi (1940) - Arundhati
- Kanchan (1941)
- Jhoola (1941) - Geeta
- Kisise Na Kehna (1942)
- Rekha (1943)
- Manorama (1944)
- Kiran (1944)
- Char Aankhen (1944)
- Shatranj (1946) - Shobharani
- Dev Kanya (1946)
- Bhakta Prahlad
- Ghar Ghar Ki Kahani (1947)
- Andhon Ki Duniya (1947) - Sushila
- Shaheed (1948) - Mrs. Dwarkadas
- Namoona (1949)
- Aakhri Paigham (1949)
- Saudamini (1950)
- Awaara (1951) - Leela Raghunath
- Saiyan (1951) - Rani Sahiba
- Sangdil (1952) - Dhaayi Maa
- Maa (1952) - Bhanu's & Raju's mother
- Naya Ghar (1953)
- Hari Darshan (1953)
- Baadbaan (1954)
- Aaj Ki Baat (1955)
- Funtoosh (1956)
- Basant Bahar (1956) - Gopal's mother
- Aawaz (1956) - Mrs. Bhatnagar
- Naya Daur (1957) - Shankar's Mother
- Sadhna (1958) - Mohan's Mother
- Post Box 999 (1958) - Mrs. Gangadevi (as Lila Chitnis)
- Phil Subha Hogi (1958) - Sohni's Mother (uncredited)
- Dhool Ka Phool (1959) - Gangu Dai
- Ujala (1959) - Ramu's Mother (as Leela Chitnes)
- Main Nashe Mein Hoon (1959) - Mrs. Rajni Khanna
- Kal Hamara Hai (1959) - Hiralal's wife
- Barkha (1959) - Mrs. Haridas
- Maa Baap (1960) - Raju's Mother
- Kanoon (1960) - Kalidash's Wife
- Bewaqoof (1960) - Mrs. Leela Rai Bahadur
- Parakh (1960) - Mrs. Nivaran
- Kohinoor (1960)
- Kala Bazar (1960) - Raghuvir's Mother
- Hum Hindustani (1960) - Savitri Nath
- Ghunghat (1960) - Laxmi's Mother
- Mehlon Ke Khwab (1960)
- Apna Haath Jagannath (1960) - Lajwanti Malhotra
- Dharmputra (1961) - Meena's mother
- Aas Ka Panchhi (1961) - Mrs. Nihalchand Khanna
- Ram Lila (1961)
- Kanch Ki Gudiya (1961) - Raju's Mother
- Hum Dono (1961) - Anand's Mother
- Gunga Jumna (1961) - Govindi
- Char Diwari (1961) - Sunil's mother
- Batwara (1961) - Suhagan / Suhagi
- Naag Devata (1962)
- Man-Mauji (1962) - Bhagwanti
- Dr. Vidya (1962)
- Prem Andhala Asta (1962)
- Asli-Naqli (1962) - Renu's mother
- Aashiq (1962) - Mrs. Amar Singh
- Dil Hi To Hai (1963) - Nanny / Yusuf's foster mother
- Pahu Re Kiti Vaat (1963)
- Suhagan (1964) - Uma & Vijay Kumar's mother
- Dosti (1964) - Mrs. Gupta
- Zindagi (1964) - Beena's mother
- Shehnai (1964) - Grandmother
- Punar Milan (1964) - Sonal's mother
- Pooja Ke Phool (1964) - Mrs. Singh (Balam's Mother)
- Aap Ki Parchhaiyan (1964) - Mrs. Dinanath Chopra
- Guide (1965) - Raju's Mother
- Johar-Mehmood in Goa (1965) - Pandit's Wife
- Waqt (1965) - Mrs. Mittal
- Nai Umar Ki Nai Fasal (1965)
- Mohabbat Isko Kahete Hain (1965) - Leela
- Faraar (1965) - Mrs. Choudhry
- Phool Aur Patthar (1966) - Blind Beggar
- Aurat (1967) - Parvati's Mom
- Majhli Didi (1967) - Kishan's Mother
- Gunahon Ka Devta (1967)
- Dulhan Ek Raat Ki (1967) - Nirmala's mother
- The Killers (1969)
- Rambhakta Hunuman (1969)
- Prince (1969) - Mrs. Shanti Singh
- Intaquam (1969) - Mrs. Mehra
- Badi Didi (1969) - Mother
- Man Ki Aankhen (1970) - Mrs. Dinanath
- Jeevan Mrityu (1970) - Ashok's Mother
- Bhai-Bhai (1970) - Radha
- Mehmaan (1973) - Rajesh's mother
- Palkon Ki Chhaon Mein (1977)
- Satyam Shivam Sundaram: Love Sublime (1978) - Bade Babu's Wife
- Janta Hawaldar (1979) - Naani
- Aangan Ki Kali (1979)
- Takkar (1980) - Ganga & Pritam's Mother
- Bin Maa Ke Bachche (1980)
- Ramu To Diwana Hai (1980)
- Dil Tujhko Diya (1987) - Mrs. Sahni (final film role)

=== Director ===
- Aaj ki Baat (1955)

=== Producer ===
- Aaj ki Baat (1955)
- Kisise Na Kehna (1942)
