= Rail Ka Dibba =

1953 film directed by Prem Narayan Arora

- Directed by: Prem Narayan Arora
- Written by: K. M. Multani
- Screenplay by: K. M. Multani
- Story by: Rajinder Singh Bedi
- Produced by: Prem Narayan Arora; Madhubala; Ataullah Khan
- Starring: Shammi Kapoor; Madhubala
- Music by: Ghulam Mohammed
- Release date: 1953
- Country: India
- Language: Hindi

Rail Ka Dibba (transl. "Train compartment") is a 1953 romantic drama Indian film directed by Prem Narayan Arora (in his directorial debut) and starring Shammi Kapoor and Madhubala in lead roles.

The film was Shammi Kapoor's second release after Jeewan Jyoti (1953).

== Plot ==
Sundar (Shammi Kapoor) is a poor young man who makes living by being a human billboard. One day, walking at a sea shore near his living place, he sees a girl who is going to commit suicide by jumping in the sea. He tries to stop her and succeeds. She reveals herself to be Chanda (Madhubala), who is an orphan and does not have anyone in this world. She used to work as a maid in several families but was thrown out of work for this or that reason. With no one to care about her and no place to live, she has decided that suicide is the best option. Sundar takes her to his living place, which is an abandoned railway carriage which is near railway tracks. There she is introduced to Dr. Nirogi (Om Prakash), who was once a magician and showman, was thrown out of work and now lives with Sundar. There is Mohan (Sajjan), who is currently unemployed. Mohan tells her that he has come to Sundar's house just like Chanda was brought there. All four become friends and the carriage becomes a place of happiness for them. They share food and try to earn living by different means, not for themselves but for each other.

While Sundar, Nirogi and Chanda are still trying to find ways to make ends meet, Mohan arrives with good news that the newspaper Prakash Daily has hired him, at the sum of Rs 300 per month. Mohan has bought gifts for his friends with the advance he has received. To celebrate these happy times, they go out for a walk near a beach. In the evening when Nirogi and Mohan are out for some work, Chanda and Sundar realise that they are in love. Both of them marry soon but don't tell anything to their friends.

One day, Mohan tells Chanda that he is in love with her and wants to marry her. A horrified Chanda reveals that she is already married to Sundar and the result is Mohan begins fighting and abusing Sundar. Soon this verbal fight turns into a physical fight, with Chanda, in vain, trying to stop the men. Soon, Sundar knocks Mohan out and drags him to the railway track. What will happen now? Will these four unite again?

== Cast ==
- Shammi Kapoor as Sundar
- Madhubala as Chanda
- Om Prakash as Dr. Nirogi
- Sajjan as Mohan
- Jayant as Pathan
- Ram Avtar as Newspaper Editor
- Cuckoo as Dancer
- Helen as Dancer

== Production ==
It was produced by Madhubala and Ataullah Khan in collaboration with Prem Narayan Arora.

It was Arora's directorial debut.

== Soundtrack ==
The music was composed by Ghulam Mohammed. Lyrics were penned by Shakeel Badayuni.

Song	Singer
"Paisa Ho Paas To"	Mohammed Rafi
"La De Mohe Balma Aasmani Chudiyan Ji"	Mohammed Rafi, Shamshad Begum
"Chham Chhama Chham"	Shamshad Begum
"Paapi Duniya Se Door"	Shamshad Begum
"Aangan More Aao Ji"	Shamshad Begum
"Bhagwan Teri Duniya"	Asha Bhosle

== Reception ==
A review by the journal Thought was not impressed with the way Madhubala was presented onscreen, but found Shammi Kapoor to be a "promising actor". The reviewer praised the "comedy and fun", crediting it to Om Prakash's character. On the contrary, Ranjit Singh of The Sunday Standard found the plot to be overused, and called it "an average sort of a picture".

Rail Ka Dibba was a flop at the box office.
