= Pardes (1950 film) =

1950 film

- Directed by: M. Sadiq
- Written by: M. Sadiq
- Story by: Azm Bazidpuri
- Produced by: P. N. Arora; Madhubala
- Starring: Madhubala; Rehman; Karan Dewan; Shakuntala
- Cinematography: Pandurang S. Naik; Dwarka Divecha
- Edited by: Moosa Mansoor
- Music by: Ghulam Mohammed
- Release date: 18 December 1950 (India)
- Country: India
- Language: Hindustani

Pardes (transl. Foreign land) is a 1950 Indian Hindi-language romantic drama film directed and written by M. Sadiq. Starring Madhubala, Rehman, Karan Dewan and Shakuntala, the film tells the story of Rajan, a teacher, who falls in love with a wealthy girl named Chanda but decides to go away from her to earn money.

== Plot ==
The film begins with two best friends, the rich Sajan and the orphan, poor Rajan doing some mischief during night in their college. They are soon caught by the college's watchman and are brought in front of the principle, who expels the two. Sajan, along with Rajan returns to his home. Sajan's father, who is not impressed by Rajan due to his poverty, treats Rajan badly. Hurt by the father's cruel words, leaves Sajan's house without informing him and decides to begin a new life.

Rajan is soon chosen by a wealthy thakur to teach his little son. He begins living in the thakur's palace after he permits him, and falls for thakur's daughter: the beautiful, mischievous Chanda, and so does she. They keep romancing each other before an angry thakur turns Rajan out of his house, as he had expected him to teach his son not to romance his daughter. A sad Rajan leaves the palace, promising Chanda to return as a wealthy man and marry her soon.

Rajan then begins living with his father's old poor friend, whose daughter Radha falls in love with him, but he lives with Chanda's memories. Rajan finds a job and soon progresses after his salary is almost tripled. He is left shocked by his boss' such friendly behaviour, and then astonished because his boss is no one other than Sajan. Sajan invites him to a function, where Rajan sees a happy Chanda enjoying with her friends. He is left devastated when he gets to learn that Chanda is married to Sajan and has finally moved on, and so is Chanda after learning that her husband's best friend is no one other than Rajan.

This unhappy situation wreaks a havoc in the lives of Sajan, Chanda and Rajan. After several twists and drama, the film ends with Rajan marrying Radha; and Sajan and Chanda leading a peaceful happy married life.

== Cast ==
- Madhubala as Chanda
- Rehman as Rajan
- Karan Dewan as Sajan
- Jayant as Rana Sahib
- Mukri as Chandan
- Chanchal as Chanchal
- Jagdish Sethi as Lala Mangaldas
- Ram Avtar as Ramdhan
- Tun Tun as Mrs. Ramdhan
- Cuckoo as Dancer / Singer

== Production ==
Pardes was produced by Prem Narayan Arora in association with Madhubala. The film was Madhubala's first venture in film production.

== Soundtrack ==
The soundtrack of Pardes was composed by Ghulam Mohammed. Shakeel Badayuni wrote the lyrics.

Song	Singer
"O Ji, Dheere Dheere Angna Mein"	Lata Mangeshkar
"Jiya Laage Nahi Mora Dekho Ji Sajan Bin"	Lata Mangeshkar
"Dil Ki Awaaz Mein"	Lata Mangeshkar, Mohammed Rafi
"Chale Ranj Dekar Khushi Leke Aana"	Lata Mangeshkar
"Mere Ghunghar Wale Baal"	Shamshad Begum
"Pardesiya Pardes Mere Ghunghar Wale Baal"	Shamshad Begum
"Kismat Bananewale Zara Samne To Aa"	Lata Mangeshkar
"Raat Hai Taaron Bhari, Chitki Huyi Chandni"	Lata Mangeshkar
"Ek Rut Aaye, Ek Rut Jaye"	Shamshad Begum
"Hua Tera Mera Pyar Fatafat"	Mohammed Rafi, Shamshad Begum

== Release ==
When Pardes was under production, Madhubala got entangled in a controversy for turning out seven journalists off the set of Badal (1951), for which she was also shooting. The journalists saw her action as their insult, and subsequently made several unsuccessful attempts to ban the release of Pardes. However, Pardes was released in theaters by December 1950.

== Reception ==
The Thought journal reported on February 2, 1951, that Pardes "as anticipated has became [sic?] an overnight favourite and looks as though it will stay to make records." It also stated that the film's "unhappy situation[s]" are "resolved with great care and originality."

Upon its release, Pardes proved to be hugely popular among the audience and was successfully exhibited in the north and south India. At the end of its theatrical run, the film was declared a "Jubliee Hit", as it completed a silver jubilee run (running in theatres for 25 weeks or more). In 1951, The Indian Express published that the film is a commercial success.
