= List of Hindi films of 1947 =

A list of films produced by the Bollywood film industry based in Mumbai in 1947:

== Highest-grossing films ==
The six highest-grossing films at the Indian box office in 1947:

Rank	Title	Nett collection
1	Jugnu	₹50 lakh
2	Do Bhai	₹45 lakh
3	Dard	₹40 lakh
4	Mirza Sahiban	₹35 lakh
5	Shehnai	₹32 lakh
6	Elaan	₹30 lakh

== A-B ==
Title	Director	Cast	Genre	Notes/Music
Aage Badho	Yeshwant Pithkar	Dev Anand, Khursheed, Vasant Thengdi, Kusum Deshpande, Madhukar Apte	Social	Music: Sudhir Phadke; Lyrics: Amar Varma
Aaj Aur Kal	K A Abbas	Shyam, Nayantara, Nita, Arif	Social	Music: Khursheed Anwar; Lyrics: Sohanlal Sahir, Zahir Kashmiri
Aap Ki Sewa Mein	Vasant Joglekar	Saroj Borkar, Dixit, Kesari, Shantarin, Samson	Social	Music Datta Davjekar; Lyrics: Mahipal
Abidah	Nazir Ajmeri	Noor Jehan, Kumar, Swarnalata, Majid Khan, Nazima	Social	Music: A. R. Qureshi; Lyrics: Muhammad Iqbal, Azeez Minai, Tanveer Naqvi
Ajamil	Jamnadas Kapadia	Manhar Desai, Malati, Suresh, Umakant, Narmada Shanker, Kanta Kumari	Social	Music: Master Mohan; Lyrics: Prabhulal Dwivedi
Ahinsa	Rajaram	Gyani, Dulari, Madan Puri, Navin Yagnik, Santosh Kumar, Anwaribai, Nand Kishore	Social	Music: C. Ramchandra; Lyrics: Gopal Singh Nepali
Amar Asha	V.M. Viyas	Sitara Devi, M. Ismail, Ghulam Mohammed, Paro Devi, Uma Kant, Pratima Devi, Pande	Social	Music: Shanti Kumar; Lyrics: Kabil Amritsari, Kavi Nanak
Andhon Ki Duniya	Keshavrao Date	Mahipal, Munawwar Sultana, Manmohan Krishna, Leela Chitnis, Vikas, Gulas, Parshuram	Social Drama	Music: Vasant Desai; Lyrics: Behzad Lakhnavi, Deewan Sharar, Kumar Barabankvi
Angoorbala	Naseem Siddiqi	Prakash, Shanta Patel, Amirbai Karnataki	Social	Music: Ram Gopal; Lyrics: Shewan Rizvi, Muzaffar Lakhnavi, Shyam
Arsi	Daud Chand	Meena Shorey, Al Nasir, Pran, Chandrashekhar, Asha Posley, Cuckoo, Ajmal, Meera	Social	Music: Lachhiram Tamar, Shyam Sunder; Lyrics: Sarshar Sailani
Atom Bomb	Homi Wadia	John Cawas, Sona Chatterjee, Dalpat, Aziz	Action	Music: A. Karim; Lyrics:I. C. Kapoor
Attention	M. Navewala	Benjamin, Yasmeen, Mallika, Iqbal, Mannan	Social	Music: H. N. Sharma; Lyrics: Safdar Mirza
Azad Jeevan	Tara Harish	Latika, Harishchandra, Nazira, Dalpat, Bibi, Dewasker	Social	Music: N. Omkarnath; Lyrics: Munshi Shyam
Bahadur Pratap	Bhagwan	Shanta Patel, Bhagwan, Ram Pratap, Baburao Pehalwan	Action	Music: C. Ramchandra; Lyrics: Chabi Kumar Mast
Barrister	Tara Harish	Benjamin, Gita Bose, Nazira, Dalpat	Social	Music: N. Omkarnath; Lyrics: Munshi Shyam
Beete Din	Ezra Mira	Motilal, Vanmala, Rekha, S Nazir, Solanki, Baby Shyama, Sheela, Bibijan	Social	Music: M.A. Rauf Osmania, Dinkar Rao; Lyrics: Pandit Phani, H. Tanvir
Bela	Chatrubhuj Doshi	P. Jairaj, Nigar Sultana, S. N. Tripathi, Usha, B. R. Sharma	Romantic Drama	Music: Bulo C. Rani; Lyrics: D. N. Madhok
Bhai Dooj	Narottam Vyas	Sharda, Pradeep, Niranjan Sharma, Manorama, Shashibala	Family Drama	Music: K. C. Bhattacharya; Lyrics: Pankaj
Bhakta Dhruva	Shanti Kumar	Mridula, Shashi Kapoor, Shanta Rin, Leela Mishra, Ramesh Sinha, Jeevan	Devotional	Music: Shankar Rao Vyas; Lyrics: Moti, Pandit Indra
Bhakta Ke Bhagwan	V. M. Vyas	Ratnamala, Umakant, Dhulia, Rani Premlata, Mehar Sultana, Babu Raje	Devotional	Music: Channalal Thakur; Lyrics: Kavi Mansavi Prantijwala
Bhanwar	Madhu Patel	Nirupa Roy, Balwant Singh, Shamim, Maya Devi, Majid Masood	Social	Music: Khan Mastana; Lyrics: Baba Alam Siahposh, Shewan Rizvi, Ehsan Rizvi
Bhatakti Maina	Sadiq Nizami	Sardar Mansoor, Suraiya, Sayani, Firoza, Mannan, Shamshi, Aruna	Social	Music: Sadat Khan; Lyrics: Sadiq Lakhnavi
Bhookh	Safdah Aah	Sheikh Mukhtar, Husna, Kanhaiyalal, Agha, Abu Bakar, Narmada Shankar	Social	Music: Anil Biswas lyrics: Safdar Aah
Bhool Na Jaana	A. E. Charlie	Brijmala, Mehr-un-Nisa, Kamal Misra, Radha	Social	Music Khan Mastana; Lyrics: Waheed Qureshi
Black Market		Dulari, Dilwar Habib, Neelam, Raza Sheikh, Arvind Kumar	Social	Music: Shyam Babu Pathak; Lyrics: Indeevar
Bulbul-e-Iran	A. M. Khan	Shanta Patel, Prakash	Costume	Music: Lyrics:
But Tarash	Ghulam Haider, Afzal Jahangeer	Suresh, Arshad, Farida, Manorama, Pran	Social	Music: Ghulam Haider; Lyrics: Ameen Gilani

== C-D ==
Title	Director	Cast	Genre	Notes/Music
Chabuk Sawar	Shapur Irani	Fearless Nadia, Atish Sayani, Farida, Azeem, M. K. Hassan, Mithu Miyan, Jal Khambata, Sandow	Action	Music: K. Narayan Rao; Lyrics: Shewan Rizvi, Rajjan, Pandit Indra
Chalte Chalte	S. K. Malik	Sudha, Gope, Kanta Kumari, K. N. Singh, Latika, Manchi Tuthi, Patanjal	Social	Music: Khemchand Prakash; Lyrics: Lalchand Bismil Peshawari
Chandrahasa	V. M. Gunjal	Prem Adib, Vanmala, Moni Chatterjee, Shanta Kunwar, Sankata Prasad, Sheela	Devotional	Music: Premnath; Lyrics: Anant Shyam
Chini Jadugar	Rashid Parvez	Shahzadi, M. Ismail, Husn Ara, Neelam, Chandrika	Fantasy	Music: Traditional; Lyrics: Aziz Siddiqui
Chheen Le Azadi	Aspi Irani	Veena, Amarnath, Ghulam Mohammed, Altaf, Khurshid Jr, Rajinder Singh	Social	Music: Hansraj Behl; Lyrics: Pandit Indra
Chittor Vijay	Mohan Sinha	Raj Kapoor, Madhubala, Surendra, Wasti, Madan Puri	Historical Drama	Music: S. D. Burman; Lyrics: Yashodanandan Joshi, Harikrishna Premi
Dagabaz Dost	S. M. Ibrahim	Rajrani, Nawaz, Mumtaz, Yashwant Dave	Social	Music: Nisar Bazmi; Lyrics: Shewan Rizvi, Fidashah Jahan
Dak Bangla	M. Sadiq	Suraiya, Kamal Kapoor, Wasti, Gope, M Esmaeel	Social	Music: Naresh Bhattacharya; Lyrics: D. N. Madhok
Dard	Abdul Rashid Kardar	Suraiya, Shyam, Munawwar Sultana, Husn Banu, Badri Prasad, Nusrat	Romantic Drama	Music: Naushad; Lyrics: Shakeel Badayuni
Daulat Ke Liye	Abdul Rashid Kardar	Premnath, Dilawar, Mumtaz, Atish Sayani, Feroza, Sheikh, Alam, Maqbool	Social	Music: A. K. Prem; Lyrics:
Dehati a.k.a. Dehati Prem		Prem Adib, Ranjit Kumari, Jeevan, Raj Adib, Umakant, Shakuntala, Shashibala	Social, Romance	Music: Premnath; Lyrics: Rammurti Chaturvedi
Dekho Ji	Wali Sahab	Mumtaz Shanti, Haroon, Anjum, Shehzadi, Khatoon, Chandrika	Social	Music: Tufail Faruqui; Lyrics: Wali Sahab
Dil Ki Rani	Mohan Sinha	Raj Kapoor, Madhubala, Shyam Sunder, Munish, Badri Prasad	Romance Comedy Drama	Music: S. D. Burman; Lyrics: Yashodanandan Joshi, Harikrishna Premi
Dildaar	R. Shivraj	Saguna, Yashwant Dave, Pesi Patel, Radha, Deepak	Romance	Music: Shaukat Dehlvi Nashad; Lyrics: C.M. Hunar
Director	S. Shafaqat	Salim Raza, Zeb Qureshi, Arif, Zahur Shah	Action	Music: Fateh Ali Khan, Lachhiram Tamar; Lyrics: Tufail Hoshiyarpuri, Aziz Kashmiri
Diwani	Y. D. Sarpotdar	Mumtaz Shanti, M. Ismael, Wasti, Husn Bano, Abu Bakar, Chanda Bai	Social	Music: Gyan Dutt; Lyrics: Shams Azimabadi, Shewan Rizvi
Do Bhai	Munshi Dil	Kamini Kaushal, Ulhas, Paro Devi, Rajan Haksar, Nayampally, Bikram Kapoor, Tiwari	Family Drama	Music: S. D. Burman; Lyrics: Raja Mehdi Ali Khan
Do Dil	Jagdish Sethi	Motilal, Suraiya, Karan Dewan, Gulab, Badri Prasad, Ram Singh	Romantic Drama	Music Gobind Ram; Lyrics: D. N. Madhok
Do Naina	S. Bhatia	Mahapatra, Shamim, W. M. Khan, Mirza Musharraf, Sadiq	Social	Music Mohammed Shafi; Lyrics: Tanveer Naqvi, Shewan Rizvi
Doli	S K Ojha	Sulochana Chatterjee, Amar, Wasti, Shashikala, Madhuri, Jayant, Pratima Devi, Sushi	Social	Music Ghulam Mohammed; Lyrics: Majrooh Sultanpuri, Nazim Panipati
Doosri Shaadi	Ram Daryani	Mumtaz Shanti, Kumar David, Gope, Pramila, Ranjit Kumari, Maya Devi	Family Drama	Music Gobind Ram; Lyrics: I. C. Kapoor
Duniya Ek Sarai	Kidar Sharma	Begum Para, Altaf, Gajanan Jagirdar, Zohra Bai, Baby Meena Kumari, Pt. Iqbal	Social	Music Hansraj Behl; Lyrics: Kidar Sharma

== E-I ==
Title	Director	Cast	Genre	Notes/Music
Ek Kadam	Ramniklal Desai	Damyanti Sahni, N. A. Ansari, Gayatri, Baburao	Social	Music Prakash Nath Sharma; Lyrics: Avtar Visharad
Ek Roz	Daud Chand	Nasreen, Al Nasir, Asha Posley, Ajmal, Nafees, Saleem Raza	Social	Music Shyam Sunder; Lyrics: Sarshar Sailani
Ek Teri Nishani	B. K. Sagar	Meena Shorey, Trilok Kapoor, Om Prakash, Shyama, I. S. Johar	Social	Music Amarnath, Sardul Kwatra; Lyrics: Sarshar Sailani
Elaan	Mehboob Khan	Surendra, Munawwar Sultana, Himalayawala, W. M. Khan, Shah Nawaz, Zebunnisa, Leela Mishra	Family Melodrama	Music Naushad; Lyrics: Zia Sarhadi
Extra Girl	K. L. Khan	Raj Rani, Arvind Kumar, Anant Prabhu, Nawaz, Ahmed, Gulzar, Prem Kumar, Husn Ara, Habib	Social	Music: Khan Mastana, Reejram; Lyrics: Umesh
Faisla	Apurba Kumar Mitra	Kanan Devi, Paresh Bannerjee, Hiralal, Gokul Mikherjee, Azurie, Flora	Social	Music: Kamal Dasgupta, Anupam Ghatak; Lyrics: Faiyyaz Hashmi, Pran
Farz	Niranjan	Ragini, Agha, Leela Chitnis, Chand Burke, Sudhir, Farida	Social	Music: K. K. Sagar; Lyrics:
Flying Man	Nanubhai Vakil	Kusum Thakur, Amirbai Karnataki, Yunus, Rafique, N. A. Ansari	Action	Music: A R Qureshi; Lyrics: Pandit Murlidhar, Muztar Behzadi
Gaon	Dwarka Khosla	Karan Dewan, Indu Paul, Tiwari, Mishra	Social	Music: Khemchand Prakash; Lyrics: D. N. Madhok
Geet Govind	Ram Chandra Thakur	Leela Desai, Prem Adib, Sulochana Chatterjee, David, Bhagwan Das, Ram Singh	Devotional	Music: Gyan Dutt; Lyrics: Pandit Indra, Baalam Pardesi
Ghar Ghar Ki Kahani	Balu Damanna	Leela Chitnis, Nayampalli, Maya Bannerjee, Vimala Vashishtha, Rajshekhar, Mehar Banu	Family Drama	Music: Ramchandra Pal; Lyrics: Prashant Pandey
Ghar Ki Bahu	N. G. Deware	Paro Devi, Ghulam Mohammed, Uma Kant, Mehar Sultana, Dhulia, Babu Raje, Pandey, Geeta Sardesai	Family Drama	Music: Shanti Kumar Desai, R.C. Roy; Lyrics: Pandit Taresh
Giribala	Madhu Bose	Dhiraj Bhattacharya, Indrani Devi, Hrishikesh, Vithaldas Panchotia, Ahindra Chowdhary, B. R. Tandon	Social	Music: Kamal Dasgupta; Lyrics: Pandit Madhur
Gudia	A Ranade, R Pandya	Balraj Sahni, Damyanti Sahni, Amir Banu, Shekhar, Pande, Nazir, E. Billimoria	Social	Music: Neenu Majumdar; Lyrics: Vishwamitra Adil, Rammurti Chaturvedi
Gul-e-Bakavali	Rustom Modi	Firoz Dastoor, Menaka, Rabab, Sanobar, Jamshedji, Ilyas Kashmiri	Legend Biopic	Music: Firoz Dastoor, Bundu Khan; Lyrics: Munshi Shefta
Hatimtai	G. R. Sethi	Vanmala, Kamal Kapoor, Bikram Kapoor, Azurie, Amirbai Karnataki, Kashinath	Fantasy	Music: A. Kumar; Lyrics:
Heera	Ishwarlal	Paro Devi, Mubarak, Gulab, Ishwarlal, Dixit, Bhagwan Das	Social	Music: Husnlal Bhagatram; Lyrics: Shams Lakhnavi, Qamar Jalalabadi
Himmatwali	Ratilal	Fearless Nadia, John Cawas, Prakash, Dalpat, Habib, Jamu Patel, Rashid	Action	Music: A R Qureshi; Lyrics:
Inteqam	Noshir Engineer	Satyarani, Noshir, Master Bacha	Action	Music: D. Gadekar; Lyrics:
Intezar Ke Baad	G. P. Pawar	Shantarin, Rehman, Gope, Jeevan, Husn Ara	Social	Music: Aziz Khan Hindi; Lyrics: C. Zaman

== J-L ==
Title	Director	Cast	Genre	Notes/Music
Jadui Rattan	Natwar Shyam	John Kawas, Usha, Shri Bhagwan, Vasantrao Pehalwan, Fazlu, Suryakant	Fantasy Action	Music: Chitragupta; Lyrics: Behzad Lakhnavi, Kamla Kant
Jail Yatra	Gajanan Jagirdar	Kamini Kaushal, Raj Kapoor, Sunalini Devi, Badri Prasad, Jagirdar, Harish, Bikram Kapoor	Social	Music: Ninu Majumdar; Lyrics: Rammurti Chaturvedi, Sajjan, Narendra Sharma
Janata	Ram Prakash	Lalita Pawar, Bhatia, Nayampalli, David, Habib, Mumtaz, Satya Pal	Social	Music: Lyrics: Rajendra Krishan, Prashant Pandey, Meera Bai
Jasoos	J. V. Trivedi	Suryakant Devdutt, Naintara, Indira, Paro Devi	Action	Music: Hanuman Prasad; Lyrics: Hanuman Prasad
Jhalak	Raja Yagnik	Yashwant Dave, Shalini, Dalpat, Bhim, Mukesh, N. A. Ansari	Costume	Music: C. Thakur; Lyrics: Pandit Gyan
Jugnu	Shaukat Husain Rizvi	Dilip Kumar, Noor Jehan, Gulam Mohd., Sulochana, Latika, Jilloo, Agha, Shashikala	Romance Drama	Music: Feroz Nizami Lyrics: Asghar, Tanvir Naqvi, Adeeb
Jungle Mein Mangal	Baburao Barodekar	Harish Chandra, Latika, Bibi, Nazira, Varne, Dalpat	Action	Music: Nandram Omkarnath; Lyrics: Munshi Shyam
Jurmana	M.S. Asif	Dilawar, Ismat Sultana, Purnima, Kamal, Maqbul, Habib, Sheikh	Social	Music: Sajjad Husain; Lyrics:
Kasam	M. D. Baig	Najma, Prem Adib, Raj Adib, Shashibala, Kanta Devi, Amir Banu Jamu Patel	Social	Music: Sajjad Hussain; Lyrics: Hameed Hyderabadi
Kaun Hamara	Chaturbhuj Doshi	Roopa, Dixit, Nihal, Bipin Gupta	Social	Music: Bulo C. Rani; Lyrics: Pandit Indra
Kaun Pardesi	J. V. Trivedi	Khursheed, Yashwant Dave, Kanta Kumari, Kathana, Mumtaz Begum	Social	Music: Ali Hussain Muradabadi; Lyrics: Muztar Behzadi
Khandani	Gunjal	Kumar, Vanmala, Nandrekar, Moni Chatterjee, Shanta Patel, Sankatha Prasad, Sulochana	Social	Music: Saraswati Devi; Lyrics: B. P. Sharma, Neelkanth Tiwari
Khaufnak Ankhen	M. Nawaz	Raj Rani, Devraj, Maqbul, Khurshid Jr., Kathana, Nawaz, S. Nazir	Thriller Suspense	Music: Nisar Bazmi; Lyrics: Fida Shahjahanpuri, Yazdani Jalandhari
Khubsurat Duniya	Mohan Sinha	Madhubala, Ulhas, Wasti, Badri Prasad, Munshi Khanjar	Social	Music: Shankar Lal; Lyrics: Shewan Rizvi, Yashodanandan Joshi
Kismet Ka Sitara	Nanubhai Vakil	Prakash, Amirbai Karnataki, Devraj	Action	Music: A R Qureshi; Lyrics: Roopbani
Kismatwali	Bahram Mukadam	John Cawas, Fearless Nadia, Habib, Mulchand	Action	Music: Shyam Babu Pathak; Lyrics: C. M. Hunar
Krishna Sudama	Bajaj	Karan Dewan, Sulochana Kadam, Balakram, Dulari, Vijay, Nirmal Kumar	Religious	Music: Shyam Babu Pathak; Lyrics: Kamalnayan
Lakhon Mein Ek	Taimur Behramshah	Nirupa Roy, Ghulam Mohammed, Bipin Gupta, Qamar Khurshid Jr.	Social	Music: Hansraj Behl; Lyrics: Pandit Indra
Lal Batti a.k.a. Red-Light	Nari Ghadiali	Prakash, Raj Kumari, Ali, Vasant, Firoza, Habib, Mohammed Hussain, Phoolavi	Suspense Social thriller	Music: Indravadan Bhatt; Lyrics: S. P. Tripathi
Lalat	Raja Nene	Anant Marathe, Chaaya, Usha Marathe	Social	Music C. Ramchandra; Lyrics: Narsi Bhagat
Leela	Dhattaram Pal	Shobha Kanu Roy, Veera, Agha, Leela Mishra, Sunalini Devi, V. H. Desai	Social	Music C. Ramchandra; Lyrics: Gopal Singh Nepali
Lutera	Vishnu Kumar Joshi	Kamal Rani, Baburao, Raj Rani	Action	Music Afzal Lahori; Lyrics: Ehsan Rizvi

== M ==
Title	Director	Cast	Genre	Notes/Music
Madadgar	Rajaram	Bhagwan, Baburao, Vasant Rao, Usha Shukla	Action	Music C. Ramchandra; Lyrics: Chhabi Kumar Mast, Ehsan Rizvi
Mahasati Tulsi Vrinda	Ishwarlal	Ranjana, Ishwarlal, Uma Kant, Devi Shankar	Devotional	Music Ram Ganguly; Lyrics: Qamar Jalalabadi
Main Tera Hoon	R. S. Junnarkar	Sneh Prabha, Damuanna Malvankar, Salomi, Vijay, Jog, Vatsala Kumtekar	Social	Music Dada Chandrikar; Lyrics:
Malika	Nazir	Shobhana Samarth, Ilyas Kashmiri, Riaz, Husn Ara, Mumtaz, Malik Amin	Costume Drama	Music: A R Qureshi; Lyrics: Tanveer Naqvi
Manager	I. P. Tiwari	Jay Prakash, Purnima, Tiwari, Rashida, Amirbai Karnataki	Social	Music Ramkrishna Shinde; Lyrics: Kumar Sharma
Mangalsutra	Gunjal	Urmila, Anand, Motibai, Shanta Kunwar, Sheelabai, Dalpat, C. Kolhatkar, Mehar Banu	Social	Music Master Ratanlal; Lyrics: Brajendranath Gaud
Manjhdhar	Sohrab Modi	Surendra, Khursheed, Sadiq Ali, E Tarapore, Baby Tabassum, Rafiqe Ghaznavi, Surekha	Social Drama	Music: Ghulam Haider; Lyrics: Shams Lucknavi
Manmani	S. Badami	Ragini, P. Jairaj, Sabita Devi, E. Bilimoria, Amar, Shri Nath	Romantic Social Drama	Music Kamal Dasgupta; Lyrics:
Matwala Shair Ram Joshi	V. Shantaram, Baburao Painter	Hansa Wadkar, Shakuntla Paranjpye, Parshuram, Sudha Apte, Jairam Desai	Social Biopic	Music: Vasant Desai; Lyrics: Narendra Sharma, Niranjan Srivastava
Matwale	Bhagwan	Usha, Bhagwan, Baburao Pehalwan, Vasantrao Pehalwan, Sarita	Action	Music: Chabi Kumar Mast; Lyrics: C. Ramchandra
Meerabai	Nanabhai Bhatt	Nirupa Roy, Shyama, Nirmal Kumar, Tiwari, Neelam, Ram Avtar, Noorjahan, Bazid Khan	Devotional	Music: S. K. Pal; Lyrics: Meerabai
Mehndi	S. Fazli	Karan Dewan, Nargis, Begum Para, Murad, Jilloo, Ghori, Pratima Devi	Family	Music: Ghulam Haider; Lyrics: Majrooh Sultanpuri, Sagar Nizami
Mera Suhaag	Amiya Chakravarty	Sulochana Chatterjee, Arun, Sajjan, Kamla Kotnis, Baby Tabassum, Ghulam Mohammed, Narmada Shankar	Family Drama	Music: Khemchand Prakash; Lyrics: Qamar Jalalabadi, Narendra Sharma
Mere Bhagwan	Mohan Sinha	Surendra, Madhubala, Wasti, Shyam Sunder, Shashibala, Munshi Khanjar, Joshi, Jugnu	Romantic Drama	Music Sajjad Hussain; Lyrics: Anjum Pilibhiti, Shewan Rizvi, Sajjad Hussain, Harikrishna Premi
Meri Amanat	P. Gupte, S. Sutar	Meenakshi, Nandrekar, Master Krishnarao Phulambrikar, Sudha Apte	Family	Music: Shridhar Parsekar; Lyrics: Amar Varma, Niranjan Srivastava
Mirza Sahiban	K. Amarnath	Noor Jehan, Trilok Kapoor, Gope, Gulab, Misra, Cuckoo, Amir Banu	Legend Romance	Music: Pandit Amarnath, Husnlal Bhagatram; Lyrics: Qamar Jalalabadi, Aziz Kashmiri
Mitti	Ravindra Jaykar	Khursheed, Sadiq Ali, Revashankar, S. Ahmad, Bhagwan Das	Social	Music: Lal Mohammed, Paigankar; Lyrics: Nazim Panipati, Qamar Jalalabadi, Mahir Ul Qadri
Mohan	Anadinath Banerjee	Dev Anand, Hemavati, Vimala Vashishtha, Bhutt Kashar, Alka	Social	Music: Husnlal Bhagatram Lyrics: Qamar Jalalabadi
Mohini	Mahindra Gill	Pran, Chand, Mahapatra, Nazar, Roofi, Vishal, Niranjan	Social	Music: Lachhiram Tamar, Bhai Lal; Lyrics: Sarshar Sailani, Raj Hashmi, Bekal
Moti	Chandrashekhar	Geeta Nizami, Burman Bannerjee, Raj Biswas, Saroj Borkar, Randhir	Social	Music: Mohammed Aslam, Dada Chandekar; Lyrics:
Mr. Dynamite	M. Havewala	Malika, Younus, Benjamin, Ramlal, Molina, Qurban Jan	Action	Music: H. N. Sharma; Lyrics: Safdar Mirza
Mulaqat	Munshi Dil	Naseem Bano, Prem Adib, Shah Nawaz, Mumtaz Ali, Rama Shukla, Mustafa	Romance Social	Music: Khemchand Prakash; Lyrics: Dil Lakhnavi, Qamar Jalalabadi

== N-R ==
Title	Director	Cast	Genre	Notes/Music
Nayi Baat	D. Bhalchandra, M. S. Choudhry	Rehana, Amar, Sapru, Sadiq, B Mukesh, Amir Banu, Sultana	Social	Music: Ram Prasad; Lyrics: Ameen Qureshi, Ratan Piya
Naiya	Aslam Noori	Mazhar Khan, Munawwar Sultana, Ashraf Khan, Shahzadi, Balakram, Siraj, Anwaribai	Social	Music: Anil Biswas; Lyrics: Aslam Noori
Namak	Balwant B. Dave	Dulari, Dilawar, Habib, Bhim, Chandrashekhar, Neelam	Social	Music: Shyam Babu Pathak, Naresh Chandra; Lyrics: Indeevar
Naatak	S. U. Sunny	Suraiya, Kanwar, Sofia, Amar, Shyam Kumar, Pratima Devi	Social	Music: Naushad; Lyrics: Shakeel Badayuni
Nateeja	Rajam Naqvi	Yakub, Rehana, Shamim, Jilloo, Radhika, Majid, Maya Devi, Randhir	Family Drama Social	Music: Rasheed Attre; Lyrics: Nakshab Jarchvi
Neel Kamal	Kidar Sharma	Raj Kapoor, Madhubala, Begum Para, Nazira, Pesi Patel, Shanta Kumari	Drama	Music: B Vasudev Lyrics: Kidar Sharma
Pagdandi	Ram Narayan Dave	Akhtar, Om Prakash, Padma, Asha Posley, Durga Mota, Kalavat, Shyamlal	Social	Music: Khursheed Anwar; Lyrics: D. N. Madhok
Pahela Pyaar	A. P. Kapoor	Vanmala, Agha, K. N. Singh, Sulochana Chatterjee, David, Sunalini Devi, Bibbo, Amir Banu	Social	Music Premnath; Lyrics: B. R. Sharma, I. C. Kapoor
Paro	Roop K. Shorey	Gita Nizami, Randhir, Saroj Borkar, Ranjit Kumari, Kesari	Social	Music: Rasheed Attre; Lyrics: Nakshab Jarchvi
Parshuram	Ramnik Desai	Prithviraj Kapoor, Leela Pendharker, Nandrekar, Urmila, Jay Dev, Pramila	Mythology	Music: Master Ratanlal; Lyrics: Pandit Betab
Parwana	J. K. Nanda	K. L. Saigal, Suraiya, Nazma, K. N. Singh, Azurie, S. Nazir, Baby Khurshid, Sharma	Drama	Music: Khurshid Anwar Lyrics: D. N. Madhok, Naqshab, (as Naqshap)
Pati Seva	S. M. Yousuf	Trilok Kapoor, Yakub, Dulari, Shabnam Bibi, Sharda, Dhanraj	Family Drama	Music: Gulshan Sufi; Lyrics: Waheed Qureshi
Pehli Pahechan	Ramanlal Desai	Vanmala, Raj Rani, Nihal, Agha, K. N. Singh, Shyam Kumar,	Social	Music: Bulo C. Rani; Lyrics: Pandit Indra
Piya Ghar Aaja	Prahlad Dutt	Karan Dewan, Usha Kiran, Baby Khursheed, Agha, S. N. Tripathi	Social	Music: Bulo C. Rani; Lyrics: Pandit Indra
Pul	Sudhir Sen	Rehana, Biman Bandyopadhyay, Balraj Mehta, Bikram Kapoor	Social	Music: Neenu Majumdar; Lyrics: Narendra Sharma, Rammurti Chaturvedi
Rangeen Kahani	Anjam Hussaini	Surekha, S. Irshad, Agha, Dulari, Agha Mirza	Social	Music: Firoz Nizami; Lyrics: Waheed Qureshi
Rasta	H. P. Sharma	Maya Devi, Amar, W. M. Khan, Anwar, Shahida, Ismat Sultan	Social	Music: Zafar Khursheed; Lyrics: Raziuddin, Arsh Haidari
Renuka	Ramesh Saigal	Mubarak, Hemavati, Vijaya Das, Shashi Kapoor, Afzal, Chandabai	Social	Music: Sardar Malik; Lyrics: Qamar Jalalabadi
Riwaaj	Ishwarlal	Paro Devi, Mubarak, Jilloo, Ishwarlal, Rewa Shankar, Bhagwandas	Social	Music: Rewa Shankar; Lyrics: Jaidev Mishra
Romeo and Juliet	Akhtar Hussain	Nargis, Sapru, Sunalini Devi, John Cawas, Violet Cooper, Nazir Kashmiri	Romantic Tragedy Drama	Music: Husnlal Bhagatram; Lyrics: Jigar Moradabadi, Majrooh Sultanpuri, Faiz Ahmed Faiz, Manohar Khanna, Akhtar Sheerani
Roop Nagar	K. Amarnath	Jayant, Raj Rani, Mumtaz, Amritlal	Costume	Music: Husnlal Bhagatram; Lyrics:

== S-Z ==
Title	Director	Cast	Genre	Notes/Music
Sajan	Kishore Sahu	Ashok Kumar, Rehana, Anant Prabhu, Leela Mishra, Ranjit Kumari, Ramesh Gupta	Romance Drama	Music: C. Ramchandra; Lyrics: Moti, Qamar Jalalabadi, Rammurti Chaturvedi
Saat Samundaron Ki Mallika	Dhirubhai Desai	Madhubala, Nayantara, Pandit Iqbal, Mumtaz, Suryakant, Fazlu	Fantasy	Music; Lyrics: Mushtar Behzadi, Kabil Amritsari
Samaj Ko Badal Dalo	Vijay Bhatt	Arun Kumar Ahuja, Mridula, Yakub, Umakant, Shantarin, Bikram Kapoor, Leela Pawar	Social Drama	Music: Khemchand Prakash; Lyrics: Qamar Jalalabadi, Roopdas
Samrat Ashok		Sapru, Ulhas, Veena, Shamim, Husn Banu	Epic Historical	Music Gyan Dutt; Lyrics: Shams Lakhnavi
Sarai Ke Bahar	Krishan Chander	Sabita Devi, Hasan, Hemavati, Shivraj, Raj Mehra, Cuckoo, Talish	Social	Music: D. C. Dutt; Lyrics: Vishwamitra Adil, Niaz Haider
Sati Toral	Nandlal Jaswantlal	Shobhana Samarth, Prem Adib, Rehana, Badri Prasad, Jeevan, Sankatha Prasad,	Mythology	Music: Hari Prasanna Das, Manna Dey; Lyrics:
Seedha Rasta	Vasant Painter	Shahu Modak, Kamla Kotnis, Chandrakant, Gouri, Pratima Devi, Madhu Apte, Indi Paul, Jilloo	Social	Music: S. K. Pal; Lyrics: Amar Varma
Seva Gram	Narottam Vyas	Niranjan Sharma, Shashibala, Sharda, Satyawan, Nand Kishore	Social	Music: K. C. Bhattacharya; Lyrics: Pankaj
Shabri	R. C. Deepak	Molina, Gopal Mehra, Biman Bannerjee, Sunder, Kishore, Prem Kumari	Religious	Music: Pandit Ganpat Rao; Lyrics: Pandit Ganpat Rao
Shadi Se Pehle	Raja Nene, Datta Dharmadhikari	Rajan, Ranjana, Raja Nene, Vasant Thengdi	Social Drama	Music Karnad, Paigankar; Lyrics: Mukhram Sharma
Shahkar	S. Khalil	Shobhana Samarth, Shah Nawaz, Agha, Jilloo, Anwar, Bhudo Advani, Cuckoo	Social Drama	Music K. Dutta; Lyrics:
Shake Hands	Bhagwan	Bhagwan, Agha, Surekha, Ranibala, Haroon	Double-role Action	Music: Chitragupta; Lyrics: Shyam Hindi
Shehnai	P. L. Santoshi	Rehana, Nasir Khan, Dulari, Leela Mishra, Mumtaz Ali, V. H. Desai, Niranjan Sharma	Family Social Drama	Music C. Ramchandra; Lyrics: Pyarelal Santoshi
Sher-e-Bengal	Mohammed Hussain	Raj Kumari, Douglas, Nazira, Ajit, Dalpat, Vatsala Kumtekar, Arvind Kumar	Action	Music Mohammed Hussain; Lyrics:
Shikarpuri	A. Shah Aziz	Shamim, Kamal Zamindar, Sadiq, Geeta Bose, Nazir Kashmiri, Khan Mastana	Social	Music Mohammed Shafi; Lyrics: A. Shah Aziz
Sindoor	Kishore Sahu	Kishore Sahu, Paro Devi, Shamim, Gulab, Rajendra, Ramesh Gupta, Pratima Devi, Sushil Sahu, Mehmood	Drama	Music Khemchand Prakash; Lyrics: Neelkanth Tiwari, Qamar Jalalabadi, Kishore Sahu
Soorat	Nasrat A. Mansoori	Arun Kumar Ahuja, Leela Desai, Surekha,	Action	Music K. C. Varma; Lyrics: Pandit Bajpai, Nazrat A Mansuri, Muztar Behzadi, Sagar Nizami
Speed Queen	Nari Ghadiali	Benjamin, Ruby, Pratima, Younus, Faiyaz Begum	Action	Music H. N. Sharma; Lyrics: Safdar Mirza
Stage Girl	S. H. Tharani	Dilawar, Mehrunnisa, Ranibala, Sheikh, Chandrika, Samson, Habib	Action	Music A. K. Prem; Lyrics: Shewan Rizvi, C. M. Hunar
Stunt Queen	Ramnik Vaidya	Fearless Nadia, John Cawas, Sona Chatterjee, Dalpat, M. K. Hasan, Shyam Sunder	Action	Music: Chitragupta; Lyrics: Shyam Hindi
Tiger Man	Ramanlal Desai	Amarnath, Indravadan Bhatt, Gulnar, Rajinder Singh	Action	Music: Indravadan Bhatt; Lyrics: Neelkanth Tiwari
Tiger Queen		John Cawas, Leela, Pawar, Shanta Patel, Dalpat, Samson	Action Adventure	Music Ghulam Mohammed; Lyrics:
Tohfa	Agha Jani Kashmiri	Nawab, Veera, Rehman, Shahnawaz, Anuradha, Misra, Agha	Social	Music M. A. Rauf Osmania; Lyrics: Agha Jani Kashmiri, Nazeer Hyderabadi, Rafiq Ghaznavi
Toofani Takkar a.k.a. Toofani Taqrar	A. M. Khan	Sardar Mansur, Sarla Devi, Gohar Karnataki, Mona, Ameena Begum, S. Alam, Fazal, Amir Khan, Kesari	Action	Music: Sardar Bhir Singh; Lyrics: Qaiser Sabai, Qaiser Jafri
Toofani Tirandaz	Boman Shroff	Fearless Nadia, Prakash, Atish Sayani, Chitra, Ranjan, Dalpat, Sona Chatterjee, Boman Shroff	Action Costume	Music A. Karim; Lyrics: Azeez Minai
Toote Dil	M. A. Mirza	Trilok Kapoor, Ramola, Ranibala, Navin Yagnik, Shakir	Social	Music: Vasant Kumar Naidu; Lyrics:
Utho Jago	Pramod Chandra	Shahzadi, Ashiq Hussain, Jamshedji, Nalini and Aziz Khan	Social	Music Azeez Khan, Mohammed Ibrahim; Lyrics:
Veerangana a.k.a. Brave Women	Nandlal Jaswantlal	Shobhana Samarth, Prem Adib, Jeevan, Badri Prasad, Prabha, Shanta Patel, Kanta	Action Drama	Music Manna Dey, Hari Prasanna Das; Lyrics: Pradeep (Miss Kamal)
Woh Zamana	Manibhai Vyas	Lalita Pawar, Padma Banerjee, Subhadra Devi, Sheikh Hassan, S. N. Tripathi, Altaf	Social	Music Bulo C. Rani; Lyrics: Pandit Indra
Yaadgar	Sharif Nayyar	Jyoti, M. Ismail Nazir, Agha, Gulab, Kailash, Gulzar	Social	Music A. R. Qureshi; Lyrics: Tanvir Naqvi
Yeh Hai Zindagi	S. D. Narang	Smriti Biswas, Begum Parvez, Kalavati, Mirza Musharraf, Shahida, Moti	Social	Music G. A. Chishti; Lyrics:Arsh Lakhnavi, Pandit Madhur, G. A. Chishti
Zalim	Behram Mukudam	Sardar Mansur, Dalpat	Action	Music; Lyrics:
Zinda Dil	S. M. Raza	Sheikh Ahmed, Mohantara Talpade, Amirbai Karnataki, Alladin	Social	Music Khan Mastana; Lyrics: Muzaffar, Fahimi Seemabi, A. R. Preetam
Zindagi	Kishore Sharma	Begum Para, Balwant Singh, K. N. Singh, Gope, Jagdish Sethi	Social	Music Krishan Dayal; Lyrics:
Zanjeer	Kishore Sharma	Begum Para, Balwant Singh, K. N. Singh, Gope, Jagdish Sethi, Latika	Social	Music Krishna Dayal; Lyrics: Lalchand Bismil, Rajendra Krishan, Pandit Phani, Pandit Gaafil
