= V. N. Reddy =

Indian cinematographer and director

- Born: 20 November 1914; Kadapa, Andhra Pradesh, India
- Died: 29 December 1991 (aged 77)
- Occupations: Cinematographer; Director
- Years active: 1943-1977

Venkata Narasimha Reddy, professionally known as V. N. Reddy (20 November 1914 – 29 December 1991), was an Indian cinematographer and director who predominantly worked in Hindi and Telugu films for over thirty years starting from 1943. One of the pioneers of Indian cinematography, Reddy was born in Kadapa, Andhra Pradesh and was brought up in Anantapur.

== Career ==
He developed a passion for cinematography at a very young age. Badalti Duniya, his debut movie, was released in the year 1943. He first excelled in black-and-white photography and film making and then shifted to colour film making. His noted films are Aag (1948), Hulchul (1951), Baiju Bawra (1952), Meenar (1954), Chori Chori (1956), Kashmir Ki Kali (1964), Do Badan (1966), Upkar (1967), Purab Aur Paschim (1970) and Do Chor (1972).

Aag (1948) was mostly made by a group of people in their twenties, Reddy was the oldest. It is considered one of the most significant films of all time. Writing about Reddy's work for the song Dulhan Chali Pehan Chali from the film Purab Aur Paschim (1970), the Indian film review website, Passion for Cinema states

VN Reddy's camera under the direction and instructions of Manoj Kumar presents this song and dance event in [a] very interesting and beautiful manner. Camera peeps through the space left by the four daflis and it is such a nice way to show something to audiences.

Lakh Tandon and V. Gopi Krishna were Reddy's assistants. Reddy also tried his hand at directing movies like Ganga Gauri Samvadam (Telugu - 1958), Sengottai Singam (Tamil - 1958), Intika Deepam Illalu (Telugu - 1961), Ananda Jyoti (Tamil - 1963), and Zahreeli (1977) among others.

Ravikant Reddy, one of Reddy's six children, who at an early age of 13 to 14 years was trained and apprenticed under his father, is a noted cinematographer himself.

== Partial filmography ==
=== As cinematographer ===
Year	Movie name	Language
1943	Badalti Duniya	Hindi
1945	Krishnarujun Yudh	Hindi
1946	Omar Khaiyyam	Hindi
1946	1857	Hindi
1946	Dil	Hindi
1947	Dil Ki Rani	Hindi
1947	Chittor Vijay	Hindi
1948	Aag	Hindi
1949	Sawan Aya Re	Hindi
1951	Kali Ghata	Hindi
1951	Hulchul	Hindi
1952	Baiju Bawra	Hindi
1953	Puttillu	Telugu
1953	Shri Chaitanya Mahaprabhu	Hindi
1954	Meenaar	Hindi
1956	Chori Chori	Hindi
1956	Chiranjeevulu	Telugu
1958	Kondaveeti Donga	Telugu
1963	Ananda Jyoti	Telugu
1964	Kashmir Ki Kali	Hindi
1965	Lootera	Hindi
1966	Do Badan	Hindi
1967	Upkar	Hindi
1967	Latt Saheb	Hindi
1970	Pushpanjali	Hindi
1970	Yaadgaar	Hindi
1970	Purab Aur Paschim	Hindi
1972	Zameen Aasmasn	Hindi
1972	Do Chor	Hindi
1974	Pran Jaye Per Vachan Na Jaye	Hindi
1975	Jaggu	Hindi
1977	Zahereeli	Hindi
1978	College Girl	Hindi
1986	Khoon Aur Sazaa	Hindi

=== As film director ===
Year	Title	Language
1958	Ganga Gauri Samvadam	Telugu
1958	Sengottai Singam	Tamil
1961	Intika Deepam Illale	Telugu
1963	Anandha Jodhi	Tamil
1977	Zahereeli	Hindi
