= Phool Khile Hain Gulshan Gulshan =

Phool Khile Hain Gulshan Gulshan (transl. blooming flowers) may refer to:

- Phool Khile Hain Gulshan Gulshan (film), a 1978 Indian Hindi-language film
- Phool Khile Hain Gulshan Gulshan (TV series), an Indian TV show featuring Tabassum interviewing famous film and TV personalities which aired on Doordarshan from 1972 to 1993, the first Bollywood TV show
