= Chori Chori =

Chori Chori may refer to:

- Chori Chori (1956 film), an Indian Hindi-language romantic comedy film
- Chori Chori (2003 film), an Indian Hindi-language romantic comedy-drama film

== See also ==
- Chori Chori Chupke Chupke, a 2001 Indian Hindi-language romantic drama film
