= Doordarshan Kendra, Mumbai =

Indian public television station in Mumbai, India

Doordarshan Kendra, Mumbai also referred as Mumbai Doordarshan is an Indian television station in Mumbai, owned and operated by state-owned Doordarshan, the television network of Prasar Bharati (Broadcasting Corporation of India). It was established on 2 October 1972, and now produces and broadcasts the 24-hour Marathi language TV channel, DD Sahyadri, which was launched in 1994 and covers most of the state of Maharashtra, India.

== Early history ==
Doordarshan Kendra Mumbai was inaugurated on 2 October 1972. The center is located at Worli and has elaborate programme production facilities and large studios. The station broadcast on channel 4 from 6 to 10pm every evening, with additional schools programming on Mondays, Wednesdays and Fridays. A second station in Poona on channel 5 was added in 1973. Regional service started on 9 August 1986.

The transmission was initially limited to few hours in a day. Besides the regional language Marathi, programmes in Hindi, Gujarati, Urdu, English, Sindhi and even Punjabi were also telecast.

With the introduction of Regional Language Satellite Services, all regional centers of Doordarshan started generating programmes in their respective regional languages. And thus, RLSS Marathi (DD10) came into existence on 15 August 1994 along with many other channels of Doordarshan. The channel was later on rechristened as DD Sahyadri.

The station celebrated its 50th anniversary on 2 October 2022 with a reunion of former staff, mostly retired.

== DD Sahyadri ==
Presently, Doordarshan Kendra, Mumbai telecasts its programmes under the brand name DD Sahyadri. The channel was launched way back on 1 May 1985. A new studio was inaugurated on 2 June 1999. Telecast time was increased to 17 hours per day on 1 January 2000. On 5 April 2000 RLSS Marathi (DD 10) was renamed DD Sahyadri and became 24-hour channel.

Considered as the best regional TV channel of Doordarshan, DD Sahyadri Channel is Number One among all Marathi GEC available in Maharashtra as per TAM.

== Programmes ==
Doordarshan Kendra Mumbai produces a wide spectrum of programmes including acclaimed serials, film-based programmes, documentaries, musical programmes, reality shows, cookery show, news and current affairs programmes, informative programmes, public debates and utility programmes related to health, agriculture and civic issues, etcetera. Old and new Marathi films shown on this channel are a favorite among the viewers.

=== Events ===
DD Sahyadri offers about six to eight events in a year mainly in compliance with its responsibilities as a Public Service Broadcaster.

Navaratan Awards.is an event in which achievers in different fields like literature, fine arts, social service, etc., are honored.

Hirkhani Awards is organized to felicitate specifically the women achievers of Maharashtra.

Awards to artists and technicians of Marathi Cinema are given in Sahyadi Cine Awards.

Sahyadri Manik Awards Sohla is organized to felicitate artists and technicians for meritorious contribution to Sahyadri Channel. Services of the employees of Mumbai Doordarshan are also recognized on this occasion through Sewa Awards,

Krishi Awards is the event in which farmers, scholars and experts are honored for their contribution in the field of Agriculture.

All India Robotic Contest Robocon is being organised by this Kendra since 2005. In 2008, Kendra hosted International ABU Robocon at Pune.

Celebrations of festivals like Govinda and Ganpati Visarjan and major sports and cultural events are brought live to the viewers by the channel every year.

=== Serials ===
Commissioned and in house serials telecast by Mumbai Doordarshan are the main attraction for the viewers.

=== TV shows ===
Serialised TV shows like Music Masti Gappa Gane (M2 G2), Contests based reality shows like Sahyadri Antakshari, Dhina Dhin Dha and Dam Dama Dam, etc. have not only entertained viewers over the years, they have also created awareness about richness of the culture and traditions of Maharashtra.

=== Contribution to national and other channels ===
Doordarshan Mumbai has been producing a number of programmes for national, sports and news channels of Doordarshan.

==== Contribution to national channels ====
All feature films telecast on national channel and Hindi belt network of Doordarshan are capsuled and uplinked by Mumbai Kendra. All in house films based programmes of national channel like Bioscope, Rangoli and Chulbuli Filmen Chatpati Gupshup are also produced and linked up by Mumbai Center. Cine Satrangi and Top Ten, now discontinued film based programmes, were also contributes to by Mumbai Doordarshan. Phool Khile Hain Gulshan Gulshan, the programme based on interviews of film celebrities anchored by Tabassum was a craze among viewers. Later on viewers enjoyed talking to their favourite film stars in the live phone-in programme Hello DD.

Most of the New Year Eve Special Programmes telecast from national channel are produced by Mumbai center.

Since 2005, Mumbai Kendra is organising and producing programmes related to Robocon India, an annual Robotic Contest.

==== Contribution to News Channel ====
Besides regular contributions of important happenings of the state, Daily Business News, telecast daily from 13:30 to 14:00 hours, Metro Scan telecast daily from 18:30 to 19:00 hours and News Preview telecast on every Thursday at 08:00 hours are contributed to DD News Channel by Mumbai Doordarshan.

==== Contribution to Sports Channel ====
The Kendra covers important sports events held in Maharashtra state including Robocon India for DD Sports Channel. Many of them are telecast live.

== Staff ==
Doordarshan Mumbai has a staff strength of more than 500 belonging to programme, engineering, administration, news and canteen categories.

== Awards and nominations ==
Programmes produced by Jalandhar Kendra have won a number of awards in various categories over the years. The Kendra was adjudged the best among all Doordarshan Kendras in 2001 and also in 2009-10.

Award	Result	Category	Name	Programme
DD Award 2010-11	Won	Public Service Broadcast	MW Shishupal	-
DD Award 2009-10	Won	Best DDK	Lakshamendra Chopra	-
DD Award 2009-10	Won	Spot	UN Nayak	Bharat Main Hai Vishwas
DD Award 2009-10	Won	Screenplay	Madhusudan Pillai	Manjula
DD Award 2009-10	Won	Editing	Shubhangi	Manjula
DD Award 2009-10	Won	sports	VY Pawar	Aquatic Championship
DD Award 2008-09	Won	Literary adoption	Ravi Deep	samander Ki Rani
DD Award 2008-09	Won	Animation	Vijay Bhingarde	Robocon’08 Montage
DD Award 2008-09	Won	Agriculture	Jayu Bhatkar	Krishi Ratna
DD Award 2008-09	Won	DG Nominee	UN Nayak	-
DD Award 2008-09	Won	Technical	M.S. Thomas	-
DD Award 2008-09	Won	Technical	Arjun Vibhute	-
DD Award 2008-09	Won	Technical	Vimlesh Kumar	-
DD Award 2002	Won	-	Shilaja Pandeya & Sheela Junnarkar	Hello Sakhi
DD Award 2001	Won	Best Doordarshan Kendra	Mukesh Sharma	-
DD Award 2001	Won	TV show	Neena Raut	Tak Dhina Dhin
DD Award 2001	Won	-	Kishan Meghani	Saap Shidi (Sindhi)
DD Award 2001	Won	Youth Programme	Sharan Birajdar	Option (Skit)
