= Khubsurat Duniya =

1947 Indian film

- Directed by: Mohan Sinha
- Produced by: Murari Pictures
- Starring: Madhubala; Wasti
- Music by: Shankar Lal
- Release date: 1947
- Country: India
- Language: Hindi

Khubsurat Duniya is a 1947 Indian Hindi-language social film, directed and produced by Mohan Sinha under the banner of Murari Pictures. The film starred Madhubala and Wasti, and its music was composed by Shankar Lal.

== Cast ==
- Madhubala
- Wasti

== Production ==
The film was announced in October 1946, alongside two other ventures of Mohan Sinha: Chittor Vijay and Mere Bhagwan.

Khubsurat Duniya was among the five collaborations of actress Madhubala and Sinha. It was also one of the 24 films in which Madhubala appeared during the first four years of her career as a leading actress (1947–1950). Biographer Urmila Lanba noted that the actress worked prolifically in this period to secure herself financially; however, this film—alongside others including Chittor Vijay (1947) and Parai Aag (1948)—was not successful.

== Music ==
The film's music was composed by Shankar Lal.

== Release ==
Khubsurat Duniya received its initial certification on 30 September 1947.

In 1953, it was among the films granted a temporary exemption from recertification rules under the Cinematograph Act, 1952.
