= Bade Sarkar =

Bare Sarkar
- Directed by: Kishore Sahu
- Written by: Ramesh Gupta
- Screenplay by: Kishore Sahu
- Story by: Kishore Sahu
- Starring: Kishore Sahu; Kamini Kaushal
- Cinematography: N. V. Srinivas
- Edited by: Kantilal B. Shukla
- Music by: O. P. Nayyar
- Production company: Filmistan
- Release date: 1957
- Running time: 94 minutes
- Country: India
- Language: Hindi

Bare Sarkar (Big Boss) is a 1957 Hindi romantic action drama film, directed by Kishore Sahu. The film was made under the Filmistan banner. O. P. Nayyar composed the music for the film and the lyricist was Sahir Ludhianvi. The film starred Kishore Sahu, Kamini Kaushal in lead roles.

The story told in a flashback by an elderly lady (Kamini Kaushal), involves a masked man called the Black Bandit (Kishore Sahu), who robs the rich in order to help the poor peasants. The masked man turns out to be the cruel Thakur's son.

== Plot ==
An elderly lady Rashmi Singh, starts telling her story to a newly married couple she's giving shelter to as their car has broken down. The story in flashback, is set twenty years earlier. The wealthy landowner, Thakur Maan Singh, is oppressive and demanding of the people in his state. Rashmi and her family have just arrived in Gangapur as guests of Maan Singh. Rashmi is captured by the dreaded dacoit Black Bandit. The Bandit releases Rashmi but keeps her jewellery. She notices a mark on the bandit's hand, which is also present on the hand of Pratap Singh, who is the eldest son of Maan Singh and Rashmi realises that he's the bandit. Pratap also suffers from a heart problem unknown to the others. It's soon revealed that Pratap is the bandit and his father asks him to leave the house. When Pratap has a heart attack, his father relents and hands over the running of the property to him. Rashmi stays by his side and they get married. The flashback ends with the couple asking about Pratap's fate. Pratap is shown opening the gate of the house, returning from a fishing trip, having managed to survive the doctor's prognosis given twenty years back.

== Cast ==
- Kishore Sahu as Pratap Singh
- Kamini Kaushal as Rashmi Singh
- K. N. Singh as Thakur Maan Singh
- Durga Khote as Thakurain Sumitra Singh
- Agha as Ajay Singh
- Gope as Sangram Singh
- Sajjan as Sumer Singh
- Raj Kishore as Gopal Singh
- Vijayalaxmi as Manjula
- Badri Prasad as Thakur Avtar Singh
- Ram Avtar as Bhola

== Soundtrack ==
One of the songs was "Jahan Jahan Khayal Jata Hai" sung by Mohammed Rafi and Geeta Dutt and picturised on Agha and Vijayalaxmi. The music director was O. P. Nayyar and the lyricist was Sahir Ludhianvi. The playback singers were Mohammed Rafi, Asha Bhosle and Geeta Dutt.

=== Song list ===
Song	Singer
"Jahan Jahan Khayal Jata Hai, Wahan Wahan Tum Hi Ko Pata Hai"	Mohammed Rafi, Geeta Dutt
"Jab Hum Tum Dono Razi"	Asha Bhosle
"Jawani Jhoomti Hai"	Asha Bhosle
"Akhiyon Ke Noor"	Asha Bhosle
