= Jeet (1949 film) =

- Directed by: Mohan Sinha
- Produced by: Pratap A. Rana
- Starring: Dev Anand; Suraiya; Kanhaiyalal Chaturvedi; Madan Puri; Suraiya Chowdhary; S.P. Mahendra; Shribhagwan; Habib; Durga Khote
- Cinematography: Dwarka Divecha
- Edited by: Manohar Prabhu
- Music by: Anil Biswas and Shyam Babu Pathak; Prem Dhawan (lyrics)
- Production company: Raj Kirti Chitra
- Release date: 24 August 1949
- Country: India
- Language: Hindi

Jeet is a 1949 Hindi drama film directed by Mohan Sinha and produced by Pratap A. Rana.

== Plot ==
India has finally won independence from British rule, and there are signs of progress among the population. In a village, two childhood sweethearts, namely Jeet and Vijay live. Vijay lives with his mother and brother Ratan. When Ratan, who lives abroad, returns home to India, he brings all new ideas of progress and advancement. These ideas are not met well with some of the villagers, including Jeet and Vijay themselves. Ratan overhears a conversation that Vijay is not his real brother, and asks Vijay to leave the house, despite his mother's protests. Self-respecting Vijay leaves the house, and Ratan plans to marry Jeet, and schemes with some villagers that will revolutionize his plans for progress, and make Vijay the culprit.

== Cast ==
- Dev Anand as Vijay
- Suraiya as Jeet
- Kanhaiyalal Chaturvedi as Jeet's uncle
- Madan Puri as Ratan
- Suraiya Chowdhary as Jeet's cousin
- S.P. Mahendra
- Shribhagwan
- Habib
- Durga Khote
