= Shiv Ram Kashyap =

Indian bryologist (1882-1934)

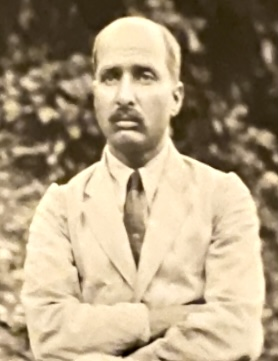
Shiv Ram Kashyap

Shiv Ram Kashyap (6 November 1882 – 26 November 1934) was an Indian botanist. He was a specialist on the bryophytes especially from the Himalayan region. He is considered the father of Indian bryology.

== Early life ==
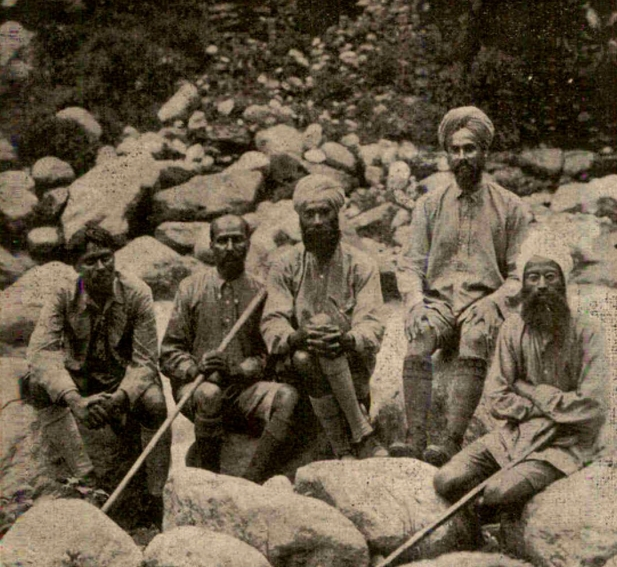
L-R: Bijanraj Chatterjee, S.R. Kashyap, Charan Singh, Kashmira Singh and Harkishan Singh in 1920 at Rihla Ghat

Kashyap was born in Jhelum District in a family that had members in the army. He studied at the University of Punjab in Lahore, receiving a medical diploma from Agra in 1904. He worked briefly in the medical service of the United Provinces during which time he privately appeared and qualified for the B.Sc. In 1909 he obtained a M.Sc. in botany. Obtaining the Arnold and Maclagan Gold medals, he went to Cambridge University in 1910 and passed the Natural Science Tripos in 1912. He then joined the Government College at Lahore as a professor of biology founding the botany department in 1919. He was a founding member of the Indian Botanical Society in 1920 and edited its journal.

== Academic career ==
Following his return from England, he was appointed Professor of Botany at the Government College, Lahore, and he was promoted to the Indian Educational Service in 1920. In 1919, when the Honours School in Botany was established by Panjab University, he was appointed University Professor of Botany, where he served until his death. He was an elected Fellow of the University for many years and served as Dean of the Science Faculty. A member of the University Syndicate, he officiated as Dean of University Instruction for a brief while in 1931. He was conferred Honoris Causa, the Degree of Doctor of Science by the University of the Punjab in 1933.

== Contributions in Botany ==
He is famous for three contributions - Liverworts of the Western Himalayas, Flora of Tibet and the sexual generation of Equisetum. Kashyap studied the liverworts of the western Himalayas and the Punjab region, where he described 4 new genera and 30 new species of Liverworts. He published book Lahore District Flora jointly with A C Joshi in 1936. He travelled widely across the Himalayan region and being a friend of the family, was an unofficial mentor for Birbal Sahni. He was a Fellow of the Indian Academy of Sciences from 1934. A moss genus Kashyapia (family Calymperaceae) was named in his honour by Ram Saran Chopra but this is considered an illegitimate name and a possible synonym of Syrrhopodon.

The standard author abbreviation Kashyap is used to indicate this person as the author when citing a botanical name.

== Family ==
He had two sons (Amar Nath Kashyap & Kedarnath Kashyap) and three daughters (Uma, Usha & Pushpa). His son Late Col Amar Nath Kashyap, Asst Commandant of the Royal Bombay Engineers Group, died in harness at the age of 35, as Deputy Chief Engineer HQ Southern Command. His samadhi was erected by All Ranks of the Bombay Sappers and lies in Pune. His daughter Uma Kashyap, more famously known as Kamini Kaushal, became a famous actress.

== Memorials ==
He died suddenly at Lahore, on the 26th November, 1934, due to heart-failure. Even an hour before his death, he was attending to his work with his characteristic thoroughness. An entire block in Panjab University is named after him. His daughter Kamini Kaushal unveiled a plaque in memory of her father at the University in October 2013. She mentioned that her father's office in Government College Lahore is still intact and that it had been preserved.
