= Pratap A. Rana =

Indian writer and producer

Pratap A. Rana, also known as Rana Pratap Singh, was a Bollywood writer and producer. He produced three films, Parwana (along with producer, R.B. Haldia), Vidya (1948) and Jeet (1949) as writer-producer, the latter two starring Suraiya and Dev Anand. He was the son-in-law of the writer-director, Mohan Sinha and father of actress, Vidya Sinha. Earlier, he was in the Azad Hind Fauj ( also known as I.N. A. or the Indian National Army) of Netaji Subash Chandra Bose.

Parwana (1947) was the last film of the then superstar actor singer Kundan Lal Sehgal, and had the later to be superstar actress singer, Suraiya as the heroine. Rana's other two films, Vidya (1948) and Jeet (1949) are also very notable films and are watched keenly to this day. All the films are available on YouTube. Superstars of yesteryears, Suraiya and Dev Anand acted in both the films. The two acted in seven films together. During the filming of the song, 'Kinare kinare chale jayenge' of the film Vidya, the boat in which they were sitting capsized, but Dev Anand saved Suraiya from drowning. This started their famous romance. The film, 'Vidya' marked the start of the appearances of the two in films together. 'Jeet' was released in 1949, and it was the film in which Dev Anand proposed to Suraiya and gave her a ring worth rupees three thousand. Pratap A. Rana died in 1976.

The names of Pratap Rana's wife was Nirmala Pratap Rana who died on 31 October 2006 In the two films, 'Vidya' and 'Jeet', the heroines, played by Suraiya were called 'Vidya' and 'Jeet' respectively.
