= Sengottai Singam =

1958 film by V. N. Reddy

- Theatrical release poster
- Directed by: V. N. Reddy
- Screenplay by: Puratchidasan
- Story by: Rajagopal
- Produced by: Sandow M. M. A. Chinnappa Thevar
- Starring: Udaykumar; B. Saroja Devi
- Cinematography: V. N. Reddy; N. S. Varma
- Edited by: M. G. Balu Rao; M. A. Mariappan
- Music by: K. V. Mahadevan
- Production company: Devar Films
- Release date: 11 July 1958
- Country: India
- Language: Tamil

Sengottai Singam (transl. The Lion of Sengottai) is a 1958 Indian Tamil-language film directed by V. N. Reddy and produced by Sandow M. M. A. Chinnappa Thevar. The film stars Udaykumar and B. Saroja Devi, with Pandari Bai, S. V. Sahasranamam and E. R. Sahadevan in supporting roles. It was released on 11 July 1958.

== Plot ==
The wealthy owner of the Sengottai estate orders the death of Lakshmi, a factory worker, and her infant son, foraccidentally coming in the way of his car. Unknown to him, Lakshmi is the lover of his son, Dharmalingam, and the mother of his child. His henchman secretly allows Lakshmi and her son to escape. Due to unforeseen circumstances, the two are separated, and the boy is raised by Malayandi, a tribal leader.

Dharmalingam is grief-stricken over the loss of his lover and child, and refuses to marry the woman chosen by his father. Meanwhile, Lakshmi's son, now named Singam, grows up to become a fierce warrior, excelling in battles against both animals and human competitors. As Singam matures, he falls in love with a young woman. The remainder of the film centers around the family's eventual reunion.

== Cast ==
- Udaykumar as Singam
- B. Saroja Devi as Singam's lover
- Pandari Bai as Lakshmi
- S. V. Sahasranamam as Dharmalingam
- E. R. Sahadevan as Malayandi
- Mynavathi
- Pushpalatha

== Production ==
Sengottai Singam was the third production of Sandow M. M. A. Chinnappa Thevar's company Devar Films. Its story was written by Rajagopal, and the screenplay by Puratchidasan. V. N. Reddy, a filmmaker based in Bombay, directed the film and also worked as cinematographer, while being assisted by N. S. Varma, an already established South Indian cinematographer. M. G. Balu Rao and M. A. Mariappan jointly edited the film. Shooting took place at Vijaya Vauhini Studios.

== Soundtrack ==
The soundtrack was composed by K. V. Mahadevan. The song "Nadada Raja", written by Maruthakasi and picturised on Udaykumar's character riding an elephant, gained popularity.

Song	Singer/s	Lyricist	Length
"Illai Enum Solley"	Jikki	A. Maruthakasi	02:55
"Idhuvum Iraivan Leelaiyaa"	P. Susheela	A. Maruthakasi	03:06
"Iru Vizhi Parugum Virundhu"	Jikki	A. Maruthakasi	03:39
"Singakutti Andha Thangakatti"	Jikki	A. Maruthakasi	03:19
"Nadadaa Raajaa Nadadaa"	T. M. Soundararajan	A. Maruthakasi	04:11
"Ahaahaa Aasai Theera Aadalaamey"	T. M. Soundararajan & Jikki	A. Maruthakasi	02:51
"Thogai Mayil Odaiyiley...Thenaruvi Paathaiyiley"	T. M. Soundararajan & Jikki	Velsamy Kavi	03:11
"Seerum Sirappodum Selvam"	T. M. Soundarajan	Velsamy Kavi	02:48
"Soorapathman Kodumai Thanai...Vel Vel Velavane"	T. M. Soundararajan & Nirmala	Puratchidasan	04:25

== Release and reception ==
Sengottai Singam was released on 11 July 1958. Kanthan of Kalki said the film would disappoint those who had already seen Tarzan films. According to historian Randor Guy, the film was not a major commercial success, but it gained much attention due to its music and onscreen animals, especially two horses named Iqbal and Dilip.
