= Mohabbat Ki Jeet =

- Directed by: Ramanlal Desai
- Music by: Vasant Kumar Naidu, Ehsan Rizvi
- Release date: 1943
- Country: India
- Language: Hindi

Mohabbat Ki Jeet (lit. 'Victory of Love') is a 1943 Indian Hindi-language historical romantic drama film directed by Ramanlal Desai, starring Leela Pawar, Navin Chandra, Fearless Nadia, S. Nasir, Shakir and Agha.

== Cast ==
Cast info is as follows:

- Navin Chandra
- Fearless Nadia
- S. Nasir
- Shakir
- Agha
- Leela Pawar
