= Meri Bhabhi (film) =

- Directed by: Khalid Akhtar
- Starring: Sunil Dutt; Waheeda Rehman; Kamini Kaushal
- Music by: Laxmikant–Pyarelal
- Release date: 1969
- Country: India
- Language: Hindi

Meri Bhabhi is a 1969 Indian Hindi-language film directed by Khalid Akhtar. Its music was composed by Laxmikant–Pyarelal. The film features Sunil Dutt, Waheeda Rehman and Kamini Kaushal in lead roles.

The Times of India reviewed the film on 5 October 1969, under the title "Meri Bhabhi: sickening sentimentality".

== Cast ==
- Sunil Dutt
- Waheeda Rehman
- Kamini Kaushal
- Abhi Bhattacharya
- Lalita Pawar
