= Paras (1949 film) =

1949 film by Anant Thakur

- Directed by: Anant Thakur
- Screenplay by: M. Sadiq
- Story by: P. L. Kapoor
- Produced by: Prem Narayan Arora
- Starring: Madhubala; Kamini Kaushal; Rehman
- Cinematography: Dwarka Divecha
- Edited by: Moosa Mansoor
- Music by: Ghulam Mohammad
- Release date: 14 September 1949
- Running time: 140 Minutes
- Country: India
- Language: Hindi

Paras (transl. "Special diamond") is a 1949 romantic drama Indian film directed by Anant Thakur and starring Madhubala, Kamini Kaushal and Rehman in lead roles.

The music of the film was composed by Ghulam Mohammad. It is counted among the biggest musical hits of Mohammad; popular songs from this album include "Is Dard Ki Maari Duniya", "Dil Ka Sahara Chhute Na" and "Dil Le Ke Chupne Wale".

== Plot ==
The movie starts with Paras which is house of a wealthy man (K.N.Singh). He starts playing cards with his friend (D.K.Sapru) and starts losing everything including Paras and from where story takes many twist and turns.

== Cast ==
Main cast of the film were the following:

- Madhubala as Priya
- Kamini Kaushal as Geeta
- Rehman as Kumar
- Sulochana Chatterjee as Champa
- K.N. Singh
- D.K. Sapru
- Gope as Bankey (Chajjoo)
- Cuckoo as the dancer

== Soundtrack ==
The soundtrack of Paras was composed by Ghulam Mohammed and the lyrics were penned by Shakeel Badayuni.

No.	Song	Singer
1	"Dil Leke Chhupne Wale"	Mohammed Rafi, Lata Mangeshkar
2	"Is Dard Ki Maari Duniya Mein"	Lata Mangeshkar
3	"Aaja Meri Duniya Mein"	Lata Mangeshkar
4	"Dil Ka Sahara Toot Na Jaye"	Lata Mangeshkar
5	"Dil Ki Lagi Ne Humko"	Mohammed Rafi
6	"Mere Dil Ki Duniya"	Mohammed Rafi, Shamshad Begum
7	"Koi Pukar Piya Piya"	Geeta Dutt
8	"Barbadiye Dil Ko Kya Roye"	Shamshad Begum
9	"Mohabbat Mein Kise Malum Tha"	Mohammed Rafi, Shamshad Begum

== Reception ==
Paras was a commercial success and the twentieth highest-grossing Bollywood film of 1949.

The film received positive reviews from critics. Baburao Patel of Filmindia called it "a rare mix of excellent performances and entertainment." A majority of his review focused on Madhubala's portrayal; he wrote that "[w]ith her superb versatility, Madhubala makes Kamini Kaushal look like an amateur." Author Jagdish Bhatia was also loud in his praise for Madhubala's work and favourably compared it to Jane Wyman's Academy Award-winning performance in Johnny Belinda (1948).

== Sources ==
- Akbar, Khatija (1997). Madhubala: Her Life, Her Films. UBS Publishers Distributors. ISBN 9788174761538.
- Bhatia, Jagdish (1952). Celebrities: A Comprehensive Biographical Thesaurus of Important Men and Women in India. Aeon Publishers.
