= Manjhdhar =

- Directed by: Sohrab Modi
- Written by: Pandit Sudarshan
- Produced by: Sohrab Modi
- Starring: Sohrab Modi; Khursheed; Surendra; Sadiq Ali
- Cinematography: Dara Mistry
- Music by: Ghulam Haider; Gyan Dutt; Anil Biswas
- Production company: Minerva Movietone
- Release date: 1947
- Running time: 121 minutes
- Country: India
- Language: Hindi

Manjhdhar (The Flow Of The River) or (Lost in Mid-stream) is a 1947 Hindi/Urdu historical drama film produced and directed by Sohrab Modi for Minerva Movietone. The story was by Pandit Sudarshan, with art direction by Rusi K. Banker and sound recording by M. Eduljee. It had music composed by Ghulam Haider, Gyan Dutt and Anil Biswas, the lyricist was Shams Lucknowi. The film starred Sohrab Modi, Khursheed, Surendra, Eruch Tarapore and Rafiq Ghaznavi.

== Cast ==
- Sohrab Modi
- Khursheed
- Surendra
- Sadiq Ali
- Baby Tabassum
- Eruch Tarapore
- Rafiq Ghaznavi
- Surekha

== Soundtrack ==
Majhdhar had music composed by Ghulam Haider, Gyan Dutt and Anil Biswas while the lyricist was Shams Lucknowi. The singers were the actors Surendra and Khursheed Some of the notable songs of this film were "Jiske Milne Ki Tamanna Thi Wo Pyar Mil Gaya" composed by Ghulam Haider and sung by Khursheed, "Prem Nagar Ki Oar Chale Hain" composed by Gyan Dutt and sung by Khursheed and Surendra, and "Mera Chand Aa Gaya Mere Dware" composed by Anil Biswas and sung by Khursheed and Surendra.

=== Song list ===
#	Title	Singer
1	"Kya Hai Nari Ki Shaan "	Surendra
2	"Kyun Tu Mujhse Rooth Gayi"	Surendra
3	"Aaj Mohe Sajan Ghar Jana"	Khursheed
4	"Jiske Milne Ki Tamanna Thi Wo Pyar Mil Gaya"	Khursheed
5	"Thi Mujhse Aaj Tak Ye Haqiqat Chhupi Hui"	Khursheed
6	"Nache Hai Man Mauj Magan Mein"	Khursheed
7	"Mera Chand Aa Gaya Mere Dware"	Surendra, Khursheed
8	"Prem Nagar Ki Oar Chale Hain"	Surendra, Khursheed
9	"Mohabbat Karegi Asar Chupke Chupke"	
