= Anuradha (1940 film) =

1940 film

- Directed by: Mohan Sinha
- Starring: Trilok Kapoor; Maya Bannerji; Jeevan; Anant Marathe; Agha
- Music by: Badri Prasad
- Production company: Circo Productions
- Release date: 1940
- Country: India
- Language: Hindi

Anuradha is a 1940 Bollywood film directed by Mohan Sinha. It stars Trilok Kapoor, Jeevan, Maya Bannerji, Vatsala Kumtekar, Anant Marathe and Agha. The film was produced by Circo Productions and had Badri Prasad as its music director.

== Cast ==
- Trilok Kapoor
- Maya Bannerji
- Jeevan
- Vatsala Kumtekar
- Anant Marathe
- Agha
