= Do Bhai (1947 film) =

- Directed by: Munshi Dil
- Written by: Munshi Dil
- Screenplay by: Munshi Dil
- Story by: Munshi Dil
- Produced by: Filmistan
- Starring: Ulhas; Kamini Kaushal; Tiwari; Rajan Haksar; Paro Devi
- Cinematography: Marshall Branganza
- Edited by: Pundalik
- Music by: S. D. Burman; Raja Mehdi Ali Khan (lyrics)
- Distributed by: Filmistan
- Release date: 1947
- Country: India
- Language: Hindi

Do Bhai (English: The Two Brothers) is a 1947 Indian Bollywood film directed by Munshi Dil. Its starred Ulhas, Kamini Kaushal, Dipak Mukherjee, Tiwari, Rajan Haksar and Paro Devi in lead roles. It was the second highest grossing Indian film of 1947.

== Cast ==
- Ulhas
- Kamini Kaushal
- Dipak Mukherjee
- Tiwari
- Rajan Haksar
- Paro Devi
- S. B. Nayampalli
- Abdul Majeed
- Kanta Kumari
- Vikram Kapoor
- Afghan Shadow
- Baby Tara

== Soundtrack ==
Music composed by S. D. Burman, lyrics written by Raja Mehdi Ali Khan.

1. Aa Jaa Koi Pukare Tere Bagair Sune Hai – Geeta Dutt
2. Aji Preet Ka Naata Toot Gaya – Geeta Dutt, G. M. Durrani
3. Amwa Ki Dali Pe Koyal Bole – Paro Devi
4. Duniya Me Mere Aaj, Andhera Hi Andhera – Mohammed Rafi
5. Hamen Chhod Piya Kis Des Gaye – Geeta Dutt
6. Kabhi Bhule Se Na Puchi Man Ki Baat – Paro Devi
7. Mere Piya To Base Pardes Re – Geeta Dutt
8. Yaad Karoge, Ek Din Hum Ko Yaad Karoge – Geeta Dutt
9. Yaad Rakhna Mujhe Yaad Rakhna – Geeta Dutt, K. S. Ragi

Geeta Dutt (née Roy), who had no formal training in music, sang two lines in a chorus in the film Bhakt Prahlad (1946). On hearing her voice, S.D. Burman persuaded her father to let her sing in his forthcoming film Do Bhai (1947). The first song to be recorded for the film in her voice was 'Humein chod piya kis des gaye'. She sang six out of the nine songs of the film. From them the songs "Mera Sundar Sapna Beet Gaya" and "Yaad Karoge" became enduring hits.
