= Agha (actor) =

Indian film actor (1914–1992)

- Born: Aghajan Baig; 21 March 1914; Pune, Bombay Presidency, British India
- Died: 30 April 1992 (aged 78); Pune, Maharashtra, India
- Occupations: Actor, singer, director
- Years active: 1935–1986
- Children: Jalal Agha (son); Shahnaz Anand (daughter); Shahoor Agha (daughter); Shahi Agha (daughter)
- Relatives: Tinnu Anand (son-in-law)

Agha (21 March 1914 – 30 April 1992) was an Indian actor of Bollywood films. He was known for comic roles and modeled himself on Bob Hope's style of acting. He appeared in over 300 Hindi films in his career between 1935 and 1986. His son, Jalal Agha, also became an actor, mostly known for the song Mehbooba Mehbooba in Sholay (1975).

== Early life ==
Aghajan Baig was born on 21 March 1914 at Fatima Nagar, Pune, British India. His father was originally from Iran and had settled in Pune but had to leave Pune for Bombay in search of employment. Agha confessed that he went to school for just three days, "that was as long as I could stand it". He spent time "mooching" around the Poona Race Course as he wanted to become a jockey and loved horses. Agha came to Bombay and joined his neighbourhood drama group. His interest in acting took him to films where in 1933 he started as a production manager in Kanwal Movietone.

== Career ==
His first film was Kanwal Movietone's Stree Dharma, also called Painted Sin (1935), starring Mehtab and Nazir. However, his films Karwan-e-Husn (1935), Wadia Movietone's Rangila Mazdoor (1938) and Anuradha (1940) helped him gain recognition as a comic actor. He acted in Kikubhai Desai's (Manmohan Desai's father) Circus Ki Sundari (1941), which was popular and this helped in getting lead roles in films such as Muqabala (1942), Laheri Cameraman (1944) and Taxi Driver (1944). His most active years were from the 1930s to the 1980s.

== Partial Filmography ==
Selected list.

Year	Film	Role	Notes
1935	Stree Dharma		
1935	Karwan-e-Husn		
1936	Berozgaar		
1937	Daulat		
1938	Rangila Mazdoor		
1939	Kahan Hai Manzil Teri		
1940	Anuradha		
1940	Captain Kishori		
1941	Circus Ki Sundari		
1941	Nai Roshni		
1941	Safed Sawar		
1942	Apna Paraya		
1942	Mera Gaon		
1942	Muqabala		
1942	Roti		
1943	Amanat		
1943	Mohabbat Ki Jeet		
1944	Bhagya Lakshmi		
1944	Dost		
1944	Jwar Bhata	Narendra	Debut film of Dilip Kumar
1944	Laheri Cameraman		
1944	Taxi Driver		
1945	Bhagya Laxmi		
1945	Meghdoot		
1946	Chalis Karod		
1946	Dhokhebaaz		
1946	Khush Naseeb		
1946	Devar		
1947	Elan		
1948	Gajre	Sohan	
1948	Jadui Bansuri		
1948	Shikayat		
1949	Balam		
1949	Bhool Bhulaiyan		
1950	Hamari Beti		
1950	Hamara Ghar		
1951	Badal	Himmat	
1951	Nazneen		
1951	Sansar	Sitaram	
1951	Ustad Pedro		
1952	Ajeeb Ladki		
1952	Amber	Veenu Bilasi	
1952	Anhonee	Vidyasagar	
1952	Do Raha		
1953	Aagosh		
1953	Chandirani (Hindi)	Mukund	
1953	Hazaar Raaten		
1953	Patita	Mastram	
1954	Barati	Sundar	
1954	Bahut Din Huwe	Tarang Sen	
1954	Chandni Chowk	Yousuf	
1954	Pilpili Saheb		
1954	Golconda Ka Qaidi (Hindi) alias Prisoner of Golconda (English)	Ashfaque	The English version remained unreleased until it was finally released on 16 January 2021 in YouTube by Prem Nath's and Bina Rai's younger son Kailash "Monty" Nath in his channel Major Mood Entertainment excluding the songs (which will be in Hindi).
1955	Chhora Chhori		
1955	Insaniyat	Bhola	
1955	Jashan		
1955	Mastani		
1955	Oot Pataang		
1955	Sabse Bada Rupaiya		
1955	Tees Maar Khan		
1955	Udan Khatola	Heera	
1956	Parivar		
1957	Bade Sarkar	Ajay Singh	
1957	Bhabhi	Champaklal	
1957	Garma Garam		
1957	Nausherwan-E-Adil	Altaf	
1957	Sharada	Ganesh	
1958	Dulhan		
1958	Kala Pani	Badru	
1958	Swarna Sundari		
1959	Ardhangini	Murari	
1959	Kali Topi Lal Rumal	Raja	
1959	Navrang	Leelu Rangbaaz	
1960	Gambler		
1960	Ghunghat	Ram Swaroop	
1960	Mitti Mein Sona		
1960	Nache Nagin Baje Been	Raju	
1960	Zameen Ke Tare	Detective Damru	
1961	Gharana	Sarang	
1961	Hum Matwale Naujawan		
1961	Maya	Banke	
1961	Pyase Panchhi	Kiran Kumar	
1961	Tel Malish Boot Polish		
1961	Zindagi aur Khwab	Rasiya	
1963	Akeli Mat Jaiyo	Ram Singh	
1963	Hamrahi	Shambhunath	
1963	Jab Se Tumhe Dekha Hai		
1963	Nartakee	Azaad	
1963	Pyaar Kiya Toh Darna Kya	Banke	
1964	Beti Bete	Saroj's father	
1964	Daal Mein Kaala	Rajaram "Raja"	
1964	Dulha Dulhan	Bansi	
1968	Aadmi	Prem	
1968	Padosan	Bindu's father	
1968	Teen Bahuraniyan	Shankar	
1969	Jigri Dost	Advocate Narayan Das	
1971	Tere Mere Sapne	Dr. Bhutani	
1971	Dher Chalaki Jinkara		Bhojpuri film
1972	Bombay To Goa	Ramlal	
1972	Dil Daulat Duniya	Raju	
1972	Piya Ka Ghar	Girdharilal Sharma	
1973	Honeymoon	Ramakant	
1973	Mere Gharib Nawaz		
1974	Prem Nagar		
1976	Charas	Head Police Constable	
1977	Hum Kisise Kum Nahin	Hotel Manager	
1977	Aadmi Sadak Ka	Bus Driver	
1981	Kranti	One of the members of Sanga's Kranti group	
1982	Main Intaquam Loonga	Colonel Bajpayi	
1983	Andhaa Kanoon	Police Constable	
1983	Ulta Sidha		
1986	Baat Ban Jaaye		
1986	Love And God	Adam	
1989	Eeshwar	Tolaram's father-in-law	
1989	Soorma Bhopali		

== Death ==
Agha died on 30 April 1992 of a heart attack in Pune, Maharashtra, India, at the age of 78. He was survived by three daughters, one son Jalal Agha and son-in-law actor Tinnu Anand.

== Awards ==
He was nominated for the Filmfare Best Supporting Actor Award for the 1960 film Ghunghat, but did not win the award.
