= Aabroo (1956 film) =

- Directed by: Chaturbhuj Doshi
- Starring: Kishore Kumar; Kamini Kaushal; Smriti Biswas
- Music by: Bulo C. Rani
- Release date: 1956
- Country: India
- Language: Hindi

Aabroo is a 1956 Indian Hindi-language film directed by Chaturbhuj Doshi. Its music was composed by Bulo C. Rani. The film stars Kishore Kumar, Kamini Kaushal, and Smriti Biswas.

The film premiered on 13 April 1956 in Bombay. The Times of India reviewed it on 22 April, under the headline "Good Acting And Music Fail To Redeem Aabroo".

Aabroo was one of the earliest commercial successes of Kishore Kumar's career as a leading man. One of his songs, "Chedoonga Main Sargam", is noted for its "rap-like" style.

== Cast ==
- Kishore Kumar
- Kamini Kaushal
- Smriti Biswas
- Madan Puri
- Kesari
- Roopmala
- Moti Sagar
- Indira Bansal
- Achala Sachdev
