= Mohan Sinha =

Indian director

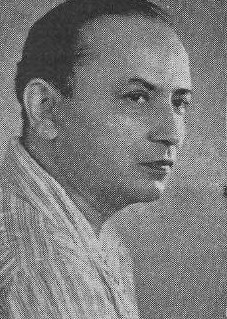
- Sinha's portrait from Filmdom (1946)
- Born: 2 December 1903
- Died: 1984 (aged 80–81)
- Occupation: Film director
- Organization: Murari Pictures
- Works: See below
- Relatives: Pratap A. Rana (son-in-law); Vidya Sinha (grand-daughter)

Mohan Sinha (2 December 1903–1984) was an Indian film director and producer. He directed over 30 films in his career, including Anuradha (1940), Omar Khaiyyam and 1857 (both 1946). He is credited with giving Madhubala her screen name and served as a director in five of her films.

His son-in-law was the writer Pratap A. Rana, and grand-daughter, Vidya Sinha, was a notable actress during the 1970s.

== Career ==
Sinha was the owner of the production house Murari Pictures. He directed over 30 films in his career and launched the careers of actors Madan Puri and Jeevan. One of his earliest works include Anuradha (1940), which he also wrote. In 1946, he directed and produced the period dramas Omar Khaiyyam and 1857; both films were among the highest-grossing productions of the year. The former marked one of the final screen appearances of K. L. Saigal.

Contrary to the rumors that Devika Rani gave Madhubala her screen name, it was Sinha who introduced Mumtaz—then a child actress—as "Madhubala" in November 1946. Sinha went on to direct five films featuring Madhubala as lead actress: Chittor Vijay, Dil Ki Rani, Mere Bhagwan, Khubsurat Duniya (all four in 1947) and Imtihaan (1949).

== Filmography ==
- Fashionable India (1935)
- Romantic India (1936)
- Badhe Chalo / Forward March (1937)
- Swaraj Ke Sipahi (1937)
- Nirala Hindustan / Industrial India (1938)
- Swastik (1939)
- Lakshmi (1940)
- Anuradha (1940)
- Vanmala (1941)
- Vijay (1942)
- Preetam (1942)
- Vakil Saheb (1943)
- Badalti Duniya (1943)
- Omar Khaiyyam (1946)
- 1857 (1946)
- Chittor Vijay (1947)
- Dil Ki Rani (1947)
- Mere Bhagwan (1947)
- Khubsurat Duniya (1947)
- Imtihaan (1949)
- Jeet (1949)
- Nai Zindagi (1951)
- Jalpari (1952)
- Shehzada (1955)
- Sultana Daku (1956)
- Panna (1956)
- Jannat (1957)
- Ram Lakshman (1957)
- Akash Pari (1958)
- Chand Ki Duniya (1959)
- Shan-e-Hind (1960)
