= Omar Khaiyyam =

- Directed by: Mohan Sinha
- Written by: Dr. Safdar Aah Sitapuri
- Screenplay by: Dr. Safdar Aah Sitapuri
- Story by: Dr. Safdar Aah Sitapuri
- Produced by: Mohan Sinha
- Starring: K. L. Saigal; Suraiya; Wasti
- Cinematography: V. N. Reddy
- Edited by: Manohar Prabhu
- Music by: Lal Mohammed
- Production company: Murari Pictures
- Distributed by: Murari Pictures
- Release date: 1946
- Country: India
- Language: Hindi

Omar Khaiyyam is a Hindi language film. It was released in 1946, directed by Mohan Sinha. The film was based on life of famous Mathematician, Astronomer, Philosopher and Poet Omar Khayyam. The film was directed by Mohan Sinha. Music was by Lal Mohammad.

== Cast ==
- K. L. Saigal as Omar Khayyam
- Suraiya as Mehru
- Wasti as Ghayasbeg
- Benjamin as Sultan
- Shakir as Vazir
- Madan Puri as Anwar
- Muzzmil as Zafar
- Leela

== Soundtrack ==
The music composed by Lal Mohammed with lyrics written by Dr. Safdar Aah Sitapuri.

1. Allaah Hu Khayyaam Hai Allaah Waalaa Matawaalaa - K. L. Saigal
2. Aye Sufi Allah Wale - Suraiya
3. Bedard Zaraa Sun Le Garibon Ki Kahaani - Suraiya
4. Hare Bhare Baag Ke Phulon Pe Rijhaa Khayyaam - K. L. Saigal
5. Insaan Kyon Rotaa Hai Insaan - K. L. Saigal
6. Jal Ke Kuch Kehta Hai - Suraiya
7. Khayyam Hai Allah Wala Matwala - Suraiya
