= A. C. Joshi =

Indian botanist and academic (1908–1971)

Amar Chand Joshi
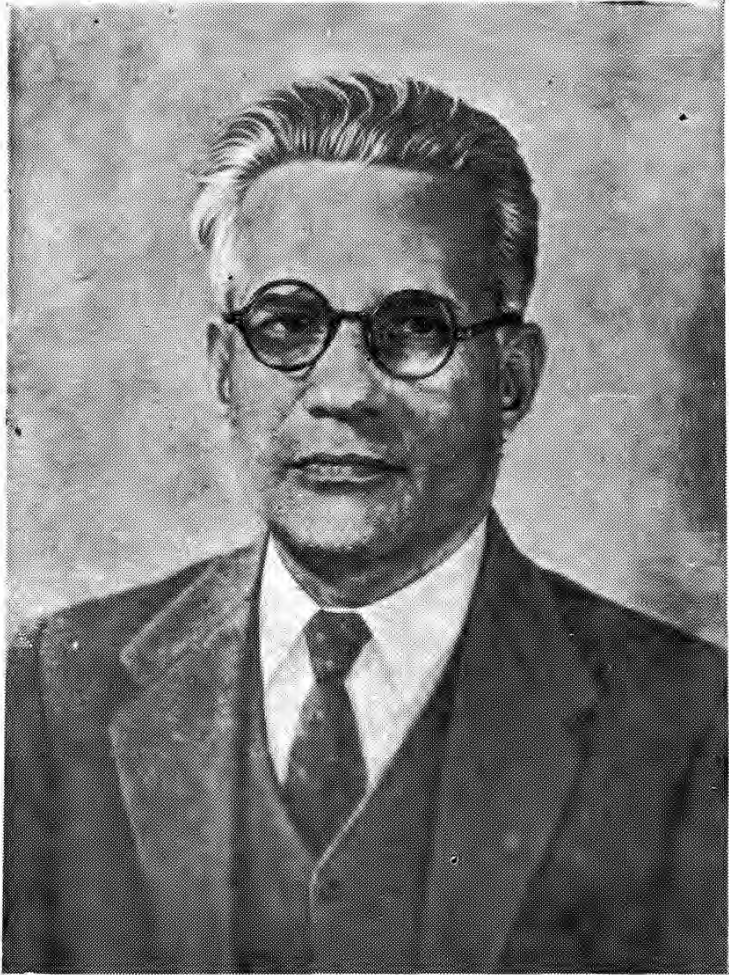
- High resolution portrait of A.C. Joshi

12th Vice-Chancellor of Banaras Hindu University
- In office 1 September 1967 – 31 July 1969
- Appointed by: Zakir Husain
- Preceded by: Triguna Sen
- Succeeded by: Kalu Lal Shrimali

Personal details
- Born: 1908
- Profession: Botanist; Academic administrator; Civil servant

Amar Chand Joshi (18 September 1908 – 14 February 1971) was an Indian botanist and academic administrator, who served as the Vice-Chancellor of Panjab University, Chandigarh, India; and the Vice-Chancellor of Banaras Hindu University, Varanasi, India. The standard author abbreviation Joshi is used to indicate this person as the author when citing a botanical name. Joshi co authored a book titled Lahore District Flora with Shiv Ram Kashyap. It was published by Punjab University in 1936.

== Early life ==
Joshi was born on 18 September 1908, in Bahadurpur, a suburb of Hoshiarpur in Indian Punjab. His father Ram Kishan Joshi was an Assistant Surgeon in the Government of Punjab. Joshi studied at Forman Christian College, Lahore, and completed his Bachelor of Science (Honours) (1929) in Botany from Government College, Lahore, and MSc in 1930. He completed his DSc in 1937.

== Teaching career ==
Joshi joined as a demonstrator in Botany at Punjab University, Lahore, in 1930 and worked there until 1931, when he became an assistant professor at Banaras Hindu University, where he later became a professor. In 1945, he was selected as Professor of Botany at Government College, Lahore, and Director of the Punjab University Botanical Laboratory, Lahore. Joshi was forced to leave Lahore during the Partition of India in 1947, and he took over as Professor of Botany at the newly established Botanical Laboratory at Government College, Hoshiarpur, in 1947 where he worked until 1951. He later became Principal of the Government Training College for Teachers at Jullundur. In 1953, Joshi was appointed as Director of Public Instruction (DPI) and Secretary to the Punjab Government, where he worked until 1957.

In 1957, he was appointed Vice Chancellor of Panjab University, Chandigarh, and he served until June 1965. From July 1965 – August 1967, he was Adviser for Education in the Planning Commission. He served as Vice-Chancellor of Banaras Hindu University, in September 1967 – July 1969.

== Passing and legacy ==
After leaving Banaras Hindu University, he returned to Chandigarh, where he died on 14 February 1971. The Central Library of Panjab University, Chandigarh, is named in his honour as A C Joshi Library.
