= Namoona =

- Directed by: Hira Singh
- Starring: Dev Anand; Kamini Kaushal; Kishore Sahu; Leela Chitnis
- Music by: C. Ramchandra
- Release date: 1949
- Country: India
- Language: Hindi

Namoona is a 1949 Indian Hindi-language film directed by Hira Singh. The film stars Dev Anand, Kamini Kaushal, Kishore Sahu, and Leela Chitnis, and features a soundtrack composed by C. Ramchandra. The story of Namoona revolves around the romance between Anand and Kaushal's character, with the former playing a refugee from Punjabi Partition.

Namoona premiered in Bombay in December 1949. The film received mixed reviews in Filmindia and The Times of India.
