= Chori Chori (2003 film) =

2003 Indian film by Milan Luthria

- Directed by: Milan Luthria
- Written by: Milan Luthria
- Produced by: Lalit Kapoor; Raju Narula
- Starring: Ajay Devgn; Rani Mukerji; Sonali Bendre
- Narrated by: Rani Mukerji
- Cinematography: Nirmal Jani
- Edited by: Sanjay Verma
- Music by: Sajid–Wajid
- Production company: Amit Arts
- Release date: 1 August 2003
- Running time: 135 min
- Country: India
- Language: Hindi
- Box office: ₹5.64 crore

Chori Chori (transl. Stealthily) is a 2003 Indian Hindi-language romantic comedy-drama film directed by Milan Luthria. Produced by Lalit Kapoor and Raju Narula, it is inspired by the English film Housesitter (1992). The film stars Ajay Devgn, Rani Mukerji and Sonali Bendre.

== Plot ==
Khushi is a happy-go-lucky orphan living in Delhi. She meets Ranbir Malhotra through a chance encounter one day before she is fired from her job. He tells her about a dream house that he has built in Shimla. After being dismissed from her job, she locates the bungalow and moves in, informing everyone that she is Ranbir's fiancée. There she meets Ranbir's family and Pooja, Ranbir's love. When Ranbir returns, at first he is outraged at Khushi's intrusion in his life but then decides to play along with her to make Pooja jealous and fall in love with him. Khushi and Ranbir end up falling in love. However, Khushi's close encounter with reality and Ranbir's old commitments hold them back for a long time before they finally listen to their hearts.

== Cast ==
- Ajay Devgn as Ranbir Malhotra
- Rani Mukerji as Khushi Chandran
- Sonali Bendre as Pooja Narayan
- Kamini Kaushal as Beeji, Ranbir's grandmother
- Tiku Talsania as Chachaji, Ranbir's uncle
- Kulbhushan Kharbanda as Mr. Malhotra, Ranbir's father
- Smita Jaykar as Simran Malhotra, Ranbir's mother
- Sadashiv Amrapurkar as Chacha, Khushi's uncle
- Shashikala as Chachi, Khushi's aunty
- Satish Shah as Ranbir's boss
- Mushtaq Khan as Khushi's boss
- Manav Gohil as Ranbir's friend

== Production ==
Ajay Devgn and Rani Mukerji were cast as the leads Ranbir and Khushi, in their first project together. Sonali Bendre was cast as Pooja, in her fifth film with Devgn. It marks director Milan Luthria's second film with Devgn, after directorial debut Kachche Dhaage (1999).

== Soundtrack ==
Chori Chori

Soundtrack album by Sajid–Wajid
- Released: December 2001
- Venue: Mumbai
- Genre: Feature Film soundtrack
- Length: 34:27
- Producer: Lalit Kapoor; Raju Narula

Sajid–Wajid chronology
Gunaah (2002)	Chori Chori (2001)	Tere Naam (2003)

The music was composed by the duo Sajid–Wajid, while all the lyrics were penned by Anand Bakshi.

Chori Chori (Original Motion Picture Soundtrack)
No.	Title	Singer(s)	Length
1.	"Aate Aate"	Babul Supriyo, Alka Yagnik	4:02
2.	"Ruthe Yaar Nu"	Adnan Sami, Sabri Brothers	4:52
3.	"Tu Mere Saamne"	Udit Narayan, Alka Yagnik	4:26
4.	"Chori Chori"	Alka Yagnik	3:56
5.	"Kehna Hai"	Kumar Sanu, Alka Yagnik	5:31
6.	"Amma Mere"	Afroz Bano, Fareeda Khan	4:18
7.	"Mehndi Mehndi"	Alka Yagnik	4:44
8.	"Main Ek Ladki"	Sunidhi Chauhan	3:58

== Reception ==
Sukanya Verma of Rediff.com wrote, "Chori Chori is a Rani Mukerji film all the way. All the other actors have done their parts perfectly. The climax would have been better if wasn't so melodramatic and didn't have to carry the weight of two songs. What makes Chori Chori likeable despite its shortcomings is that it has a 'heart' -- the prime ingredient for any love story."

Taran Adarsh of Bollywood Hungama wrote, "Although Chori Chori has an interesting storyline, it suffers on account of a hackneyed screenplay. A story like this may've worked a few years ago, but it holds minimal appeal in the current scenario. The film starts off pretty well, but runs out of steam in the second half, mainly because too many songs have been incorporated forcefully."
