= Tabassum =

Indian film actress (1944–2022)

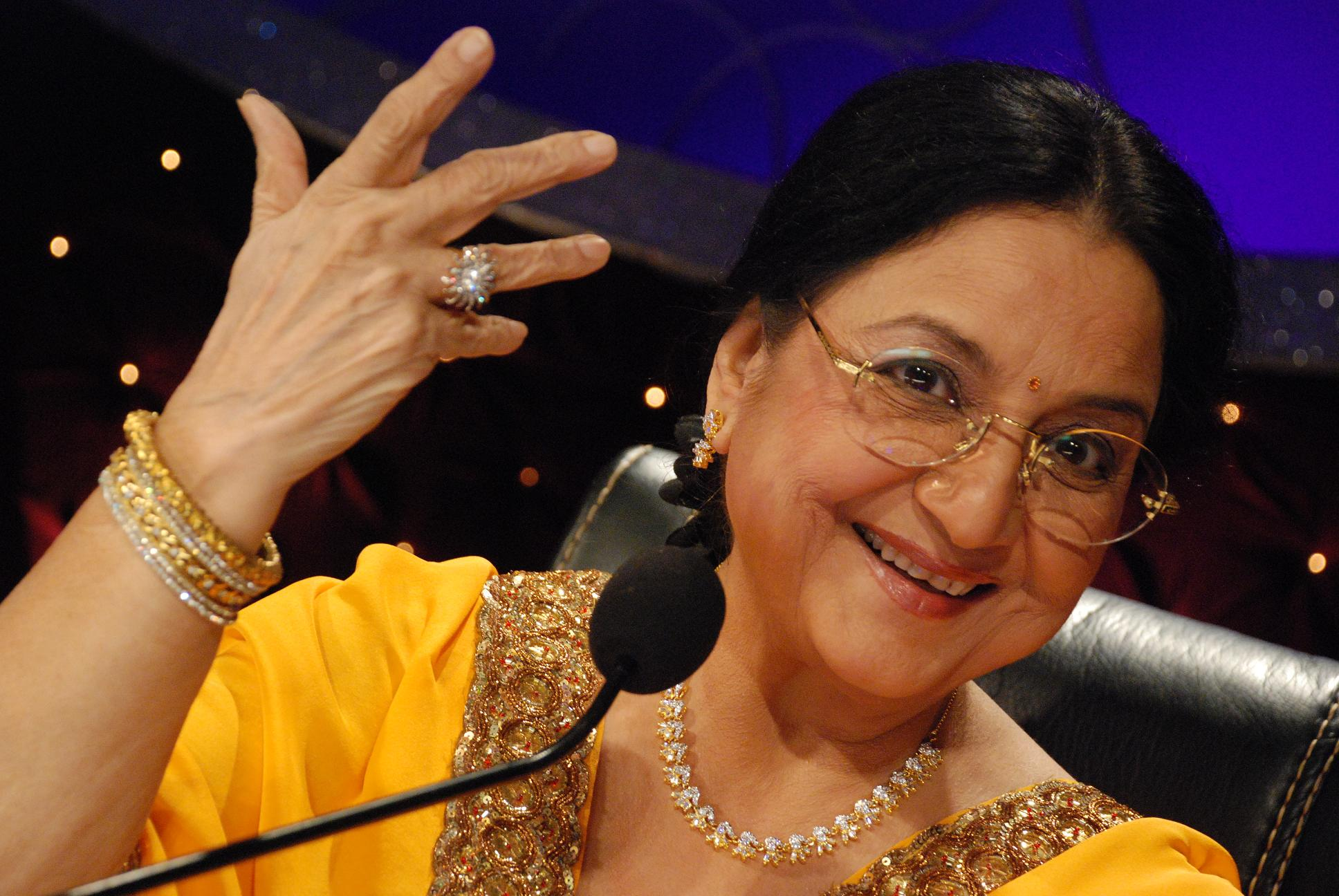
- Born: Kiran Bala Sachdev; 9 July 1944; Bombay, Bombay Province, British India
- Died: 18 November 2022 (aged 78); Mumbai, Maharashtra, India
- Other name: Baby Tabassum
- Occupations: Actress, Talk show host
- Years active: 1947–2022
- Known for: Phool Khile Hain Gulshan Gushan (1972–1993)
- Spouse: Vijay Govil (m. 1960)
- Children: Hoshang Govil (son)
- Relatives: Arun Govil (brother-in-law)

Tabassum (born Kiran Bala Sachdev; 9 July 1944 – 18 November 2022) was an Indian actress, talk show host and YouTuber, who started her career as child actor Baby Tabassum in 1947. She later had a television career as the host of first TV talk show of Indian television, Phool Khile Hain Gulshan Gulshan. It ran on National broadcaster Doordarshan from 1972 to 1993, wherein she interviewed film and TV personalities.

== Early life and background ==
Tabassum was born in Mumbai, then known as Bombay, in 1944 to Ayodhyanath Sachdev and Asghari Begum, a freedom fighter, journalist and author. She explained how she was named in an interview in 2014:

My father named me 'Tabassum', keeping my mother's religious sentiments in mind. My mother kept my name 'Kiran Bala', keeping my father's religious sentiments in mind. My name on all official documents was 'Kiran Bala Sachdev'. After marriage, it became 'Kiran Bala Govil'. 'Tabassum' is my screen name; it means muskhurahat (smile).

== Career ==
Tabassum made her film debut as a child actor with Nargis (1947) followed by Mera Suhaag (1947), Manjhdhar (1947) and Bari Behen (1949). Later in Deedar (1951), directed by Nitin Bose, she played the childhood role of Nargis; the hit song Bachpan Ke Din Bhula Na Dena sung by Lata Mangeshkar and Shamshad Begum was picturised on her. Also, in the next year, she appeared in another important film Baiju Bawra (1952) directed by Vijay Bhatt, where she appeared in the childhood role of Meena Kumari. She also worked in the popular film Phir Wohi Dil Laya Hoon starring Joy Mukherjee and Asha Parekh. She also starred in the beautiful song 'Aji qibla mohtarma'. After a gap, she reentered films in adult roles, working as a character actress.

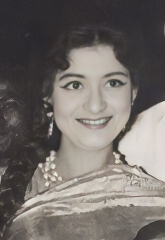
Tabassum in the 1960s

Tabassum hosted the first talk show of Indian television, Phool Khile Hain Gulshan Gulshan, which ran for 21 years from 1972 to 1993. Produced by Doordarshan Kendra Mumbai, it was based on interviews of film celebrities and became immensely popular. This also led to a career as stage compere. She was also the editor of Grihalaxmi, a Hindi women's magazine for 15 years and wrote many joke books.

In 1985, she directed, produced and wrote her first film, Tum Par Hum Qurban. In 2006, she returned to television, as an actress in Pyaar Ke Do Naam: Ek Raadha, Ek Shyaam, produced by Rajshri Productions. She became a judge in a reality stand-up comedy show Ladies Special (2009) on Zee TV.

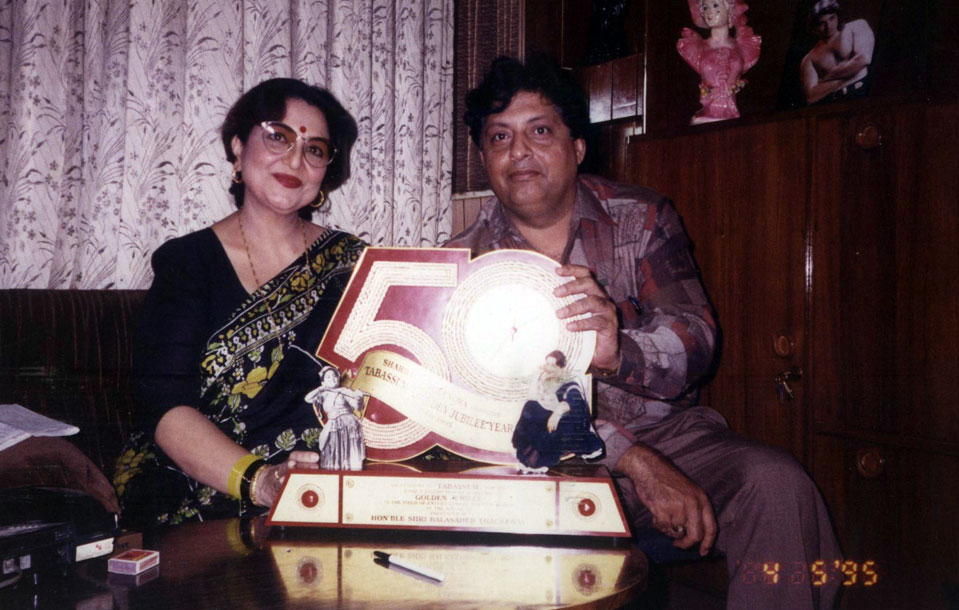
Tabassum in 1995

Tabassum continued to work as an interviewer for television and was doing a TV show on TV Asia USA and Canada titled Abhi Toh Main Jawaan Hoon based on the Golden Era of Hindi Cinema directed by her son Hoshang Govil for 12 years. In 2016, she launched her channel on YouTube, titled "TabassumTalkies" Produced and Directed by her son Hoshang Govil who is carrying her legacy by hosting Tabassum Talkies which consists of nostalgic talks, interviews of celebrities, shayaris, jokes and more. Subsequently, she returned to television with "Tab Aur Ab" in 2020.

== Personal life ==
Tabassum was married to Vijay Govil, elder brother of television actor Arun Govil. Their son Hoshang Govil (born 1961) had brief career as a lead in three films Tum Par Hum Qurbaan (1985), which was produced and directed by Tabassum and introduced Johnny Lever for the first time on screen as a comedian, Kartoot (1987) and Ajeeb Dastaan Hai Yeah (1996) produced by Zee TV and directed by J Om Prakash (grandfather of Hrithik Roshan). In 2009, her granddaughter Khushi (daughter of Hoshang) made her film debut with Hum Phir Mile Na Mile.

== Death ==
Tabassum suffered from gastrointestinal issues in her last days. She was admitted in hospital but died on 18 November 2022, after suffering two successive cardiac arrests. She was 78. Various celebrities including Amitabh Bachchan, Twinkle Khanna, Adnan Sami, Asha Parekh, Waheeda Rehman, Deepti Naval and others condoled her death. Milk brand Amul gave Tabassum a tribute with a special doodle.

== Filmography ==
=== Films ===
- Nargis (1947)
- Mera Suhaag (1947)
- Manjhdhar (1947)
- Bari Behen (1949) as Munni
- Chhoti Bhabhi (1950)
- Sargam (1950)
- Sangram (1950)
- Jogan (1950) as Mangu
- Gumashta (1951)
- Aaram (1951)
- Deedar (1951)
- Bahar (1951)
- Afsana (1951) as Young Meera
- Baiju Bawra (1952) Young Gauri
- Baap Beti (1954)
- College Girl (1960)
- Mughal-e-Azam (1960)
- Dharmputra (1961) as Rekha Rai
- Phir Wohi Dil Laya Hoon (1963)
- Dara Singh: Ironman (1964)
- Zimbo Ka Beta (1966)
- Dulhan Ek Raat Ki (1967)
- Ganwaar (1970) as Mistress
- Bachpan (1970) as Lily – Tom's wife
- Heer Raanjha (1970)
- Johny Mera Naam (1970)
- Shri Krishna Leela (1971) as Rasili
- Shree Krishnarjun Yuddh (1971) as Chitrangini
- Ladki Pasand Hai (1971)
- Gambler (1971)
- Adhikar (1971)
- Tere Mere Sapne (1971) as Maltimala's Hairdresser
- Hulchul (1971)
- Shaadi Ke Baad (1972) as Basanti
- Maa Bahen Aur Biwi (1974)
- Sur Sangam (1985)
- Naache Mayuri (1986)
- Chameli Ki Shaadi (1986)
- Swarg (1990) as Herself

=== Television ===
- Phool Khile Hain Gulshan Gulshan (1972 – 1993, Doordarshan)
- Pyaar Ke Do Naam: Ek Raadha, Ek Shyaam (2006, StarPlus) as Kishan's grandmother
- Ladies Special (2009, Zee TV) as Herself (Judge)
- Tab Aur Ab (2020, Tata Play)

=== Web ===
- Tabassum Talkies (2016–2022, YouTube)
