= Kamini Kaushal =

Indian actress (1927–2025)

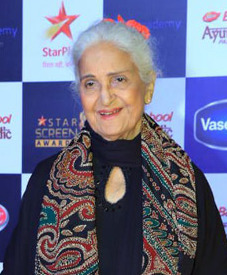
- Kaushal c. 2019
- Born: Uma Kashyap; 24 February 1927; Lahore, Punjab Province, British India (present-day Punjab, Pakistan)
- Died: 13 November 2025 (aged 98); Mumbai, Maharashtra, India
- Occupations: Actress; producer; director
- Years active: 1946–2022
- Spouse: Braham S. Sood (m. 1948, died)
- Father: Shiv Ram Kashyap

Kamini Kaushal (born Uma Kashyap; 24 February 1927 – 13 November 2025) was an Indian actress who worked in Hindi films and television in a career spanning seven decades. She is regarded as one of the finest actresses of Hindi cinema. She is noted for her roles in films such as Neecha Nagar (1946), which won the 1946 Palme d'Or at the Cannes Film Festival and Biraj Bahu (1954), which won her the Filmfare Award for Best Actress in 1956.

Kaushal played the lead heroine in films from 1946 to 1963, wherein her roles in Do Bhai (1947), Shaheed (1948), Nadiya Ke Paar (1948), Ziddi (1948), Shabnam (1949), Paras (1949), Namoona (1949), Arzoo (1950), Jhanjar (1953), Aabroo (1956), Bade Sarkar (1957), Jailor (1958), Night Club (1958) and Godaan (1963) are considered her career's best performances. She played character roles from 1963 onwards, and was critically acclaimed for her performance in Shaheed (1965). She appeared in three of Rajesh Khanna's films, namely Do Raaste (1969), Prem Nagar (1974), Maha Chor (1976), in Anhonee (1973) with Sanjeev Kumar and in eight films with Manoj Kumar namely Shaheed, Upkar (1967), Purab Aur Paschim (1970), Shor (1972), Roti Kapda Aur Makaan (1974), Sanyasi (1975), Dus Numbri (1976) and Santosh (1989).

From the 1990s, Kaushal only sporadically appeared in films. She latterly appeared in Chennai Express (2013) and the romantic drama Kabir Singh (2019), both of which rank among the highest grossing Indian films, winning the Screen Award for Best Supporting Actress and a nomination for the Filmfare Award for Best Supporting Actress for the latter. She made her final film appearance with a cameo in Laal Singh Chaddha in 2022.

== Early life ==
Kamini Kaushal was born in Lahore on 24 February 1927. She was the youngest of two brothers and three sisters. She was the daughter of Shiv Ram Kashyap, professor of botany, University of Punjab at Lahore, British India (present-day Pakistan), and used to have a house in Chaubarji area of Lahore. Kashyap is widely regarded as the father of Indian botany. Her father was a distinguished botanist who discovered six species of plants. She was only seven when her father died on 26 November 1934. She did her B.A. (honours) in English literature from Government College in Lahore. She got an offer to act in films through Chetan Anand in 1946 with Neecha Nagar.

Talking about her teenage years, she said in an interview, "I had no time to fool. I didn't have any crush. I was busy swimming, riding, skating and doing radio plays on Akashwani, for which I was paid Rs 10." When her elder sister died in a car accident, leaving behind two daughters, Kaushal had to marry her brother-in-law, B.S. Sood in 1948. She set up home in Bombay where her husband was a chief engineer in Bombay Port Trust. Her elder sister's daughters are Kumkum Somani and Kavita Sahni. Kumkum Somani has written a book for children on Gandhi's philosophy and Kavita Sahni is an artist. Kamini had three sons after 1955, Rahul, Vidur and Shravan.

In the 1950s, the couple lived in a spacious manor-type house "Gateside" in Mazagaon, which was allotted to her husband by BPT.

== Career ==
Kamini had been a stage actress in Delhi during her college days from 1942 to 1945. She worked as a radio child artist with the name "Uma" in Lahore before the Partition, from 1937 to 1940. She said in an interview about whether she wanted to be an actress in her childhood: "I come from a very intellectual family. My dad, S. R. Kashyap, was a professor at Government College, Lahore and the President of the Science Congress. He'd written about 50 books on botany. Growing up, our family concentrated more on knowledge, but he never deterred us from doing anything we wanted as long as it was positive." Though she had no dreams of joining the film industry while being in college, she was a fan of actor Ashok Kumar. Once she said in an interview: "We were to perform for the war relief fund in college. Ashok Kumar and Leela Chitins were the chief guests. After the show we went to meet him. I thought of having some fun. As he stood talking to the students, I pulled his hair from behind." Chetan Anand gave her the role of the leading heroine in his film Neecha Nagar. This movie was done by her before marriage and released in 1946. She quoted in an interview, when asked about why her name was changed from Uma to Kamini: "Chetan's wife Uma Anand was also part of the film. My name also being Uma, he wanted a different name for me. I asked him to give me a name beginning with 'K' to match with the names of my daughters Kumkum and Kavita." She won an award at the Montreal Film Festival for her performance in her debut film. She quoted in an interview about how she got her debut film: "Ravi Shankar was new, he had not done music for anybody. It was Zohra Segal's debut. Uma Anand (Chetan's wife) was with us in college — we were together. Chetan had been teaching at The Doon School and got to me through my brother.".

After Neecha Nagar, she returned to Lahore, but offers started coming in, hence she used to come for shooting from Lahore. After her sudden marriage in 1947, she settled in Bombay with her husband. She became the first leading heroine to continue working as lead film heroine after her marriage as well. Kamini was one of the first well educated heroines (BA in English) in Hindi cinema. She learnt Bharatnatyam at Mumbai's Sri Rajarajeswari Bharata Natya Kala Mandir, where Guru T. K. Mahalingam Pillai, doyen among nattuvanars taught. Since 1948, Kamini Kaushal worked with all the top leading men of her time, such as Ashok Kumar, Raj Kapoor, Dev Anand, Raaj Kumar and Dilip Kumar.

In every film starring her as lead heroine, except when opposite Ashok Kumar, in the period 1947 to 1955, her name used to appear first in the credits before the leading hero's name appeared. Her pairing opposite Dilip Kumar was popular with audiences with box office hits such as Shaheed (1948), Pugree, Nadiya Ke Paar (1949), Shabnam (1949) and Arzoo (1950)). The popularity as an actress increased with Filmistan's Do Bhai (1947), aided by Geeta Roy's impassioned singing of songs such as "Mera sundar sapna", which, incidentally, was shot in a single take. Kamini was paired opposite Dev Anand in his very first success, Bombay Talkies' production Ziddi (1948), a light romance. The pair followed this up with Namoona. Kamini played the third angle to the Dev-Suraiya pair in Shayar. In Raj Kapoor's directorial debut Aag (1948), she did a cameo as one of his three heroines (Nargis and Nigar were the other two), whose relationship with the hero doesn't fructify. She also starred with Raj Kapoor in Jail Yatra.

Kamini Kaushal was the first lead heroine for whom Lata Mangeshkar ever sang for and it was for the film Ziddi in 1948. Kamini quoted in an interview: "Lata sang for me in Ziddi for the first time. That was the first time she sang for the leading lady in a film. Before that, she sang for actresses in supporting roles. Shamshad Begum and Surinder Kaur — whose voices had more bass — used to sing my songs. On the music credits on the record, Lata's name was not mentioned. Instead, it was mentioned that Asha sang the songs — Asha was my screen name (in the film Ziddi). That's why people thought I had sung it. The playback singers - Kishore Kumar and Lata Mangeshkar recorded their first duet - "Ye Kaun Aya Re" together in the 1948 film Ziddi.

Her other successful films as lead heroine in films from 1946 to 1963 include Paras (1949), Namoona, Jhanjar, Aabroo, Night Club, Jailor, Bade Sarkar, Bada Bhai, Poonam and Godaan. Kamini became a producer and signed on then-matinee idol Ashok Kumar in Poonam and Night Club. She did lighthearted roles in Chalis Baba Ek Chor (1954) and also did serious tragedy genre roles in Aas, Ansoo and Jailor. In the Sohrab Modi-directed Jailor (1958), Kamini gave a goosebump-raising performance as Modi's wife, who is pushed towards adultery by his ruthless tyranny. Trilok Jetley, who adopted Premchand's famous story Godaan on screen, put his film on hold, while Kamini was pregnant with her second child, because he wanted to capitalise on the softness in her voice. Pandit Ravi Shankar composed the score for her first (Neecha Nagar in 1946) and last (Godaan in 1963) films as a heroine.

In 1965, she moved to playing character roles with a film called Shaheed. She made the transition from playing leading heroine roles to character roles very easily. Her performances were appreciated in Waris, Vishwas, Yakeen, Aadmi Aur Insaan, Uphaar, Qaid, Bhanwar, Tangewala and Heeralaal Pannalaal. As a character artist she was a fixture in seven Manoj Kumar films - Shaheed, Upkar, Purab Aur Paschim, Sanyasi, Shor, Roti Kapda Aur Makaan, Dus Numbari and Santosh (1989). Kaushal had a long stint in films with releases till 2014. She stunned audiences by playing a mercenary vamp with aplomb in the film Anhonee (1973). Kamini Kaushal played mother to Rajesh Khanna in Prem Nagar in 1974, and in Maha Chor in 1976, and as sister in law to Khanna in Do Raaste.

Dilip Kumar, in his biography, has admitted his attraction to her while they acted in films together, but Kamini rejected his proposal as she was already married to her elder sister's widower and was taking care of her elder sister's kids. Dilip said that she was his first love. Kamini quoted in an interview on this: "We were both shattered. We were very happy with each other. We shared a great rapport. But what to do? That's life. I can't dump people and say 'Enough now, I'm going!' I had taken on the girls. I wouldn't be able to show my face to my sister. My husband, a fine human being, understood why it happened. Everyone falls in love."

She made a popular puppet show broadcast on the national channel at the time, "Doordarshan", which ran for a year (1989 to 1991), and was the first such children's series in Hindi. She stepped into writing children's stories. Her stories used to be published in the children's magazine Paraag, featuring the antics of 'Bunty', and 'Chotbhai' and 'Motabhai' – who were all loosely based on her own son and his cousin contemporaries. She dabbled in television doing serials such as Chand Sitare on Doordarshan. In 1986, Kaushal made an animation film, Meri Pari.

She appeared in The Jewel in the Crown (1984), a popular British television serial, as Aunt Shalini.

Kaushal worked in the highly popular serial Shanno Ki Shaadi, on StarPlus. She played Bebe, the grandmother of Shanno, the main protagonist played by Divya Dutta. She also acted in Sri Adhikari Brothers' TV Serial Waqt Ki Raftaar (DD National).

She said in an interview: "I, along with only few Indian heroines like Saroja Devi, Bhanumathi Ramakrishna, Sowcar Janaki, Mala Sinha, Moushumi Chatterjee, Padmini and Sharmila Tagore were the few who got married early and had success in the film industry even after our marriages as well as led a happy married life."

Since the 1990s, she only occasionally appeared in films such as Gumrah (1993), Har Dil Jo Pyar Karega (2000), Chori Chori (2003), Chennai Express (2013) and Kabir Singh (2019). Her final film appearance was a cameo in Laal Singh Chaddha in 2022.

== Death ==
Kaushal died in Mumbai on 13 November 2025, at the age of 98.

== Awards ==
- 1956: Filmfare Award for Best Actress: Biraj Bahu
- 1964: BFJA Awards for Best Supporting Actress (Hindi): Shaheed
- 2011: Kalakar Awards: Lifetime Achievement Award
- 2013: Kalpana Chawla Excellence Award
- 2015: Filmfare Lifetime Achievement Award
- 2015: BBC's 100 Women.
- 2020: Screen Award for Best Supporting Actress: Kabir Singh
- 2020: Filmfare Award for Best Supporting Actress: Kabir Singh (nominated)

== Legacy ==
One of the highest paid actresses of the late 1940s, Kaushal appeared in Box Office India's "Top Actresses" list twice, 1947 and 1948. In 2022, she was placed in Outlook India's "75 Best Bollywood Actresses" list.

== Filmography ==
Films as actor
Year	Title	Role	Notes
1946	Neecha Nagar	Roopa	Debut film
1947	Do Bhai		
1947	Jail Yatra		
1948	Aag	Nirmala	
1948	Shaheed	Sheila	
1948	Pugree	Roopa	
1948	Nadiya Ke Par	Phoolwa	
1948	Ziddi	Asha	
1949	Namoona	Rekha	
1949	Paras	Geeta	
1949	Rakhi		
1949	Shair	Beena	
1949	Shabnam	Shanti	
1950	Arzoo	Kamini	
1951	Bikhre Moti		
1952	Poonam	Chanda	
1953	Aansoo		
1953	Aas	Asha	
1953	Gunah		Special appearance
1953	Jhanjhar		
1953	Raja Ratan		
1953	Shahenshah	Noor	
1954	Biraj Bahu	Biraj Chakravarty	
1954	Chalis Baba Ek Chor		
1954	Radha Krishna		
1954	Sangam		
1956	Aabroo		
1957	Bada Bhai	Lakshmi	
1957	Bade Sarkar	Rashmi	
1958	Great Show of India		
1958	Jailor	Kamala	
1958	Night Club	Bindu	
1959	Bank Manager	Sudha	
1963	Godaan	Jhuniya	
1965	Bheegi Raat	Pushpa	
1965	Janam Janam Ke Saathi		
1965	Shaheed	Mrs. Kishan Singh	
1967	Upkaar	Radha	
1968	Aanchal Ke Phool	Maya	
1969	Aadmi Aur Insaan	Meena Khanna's mother	
1969	Beti	Mrs. Verma	
1969	Do Raaste	Madhavi Gupta	
1969	Ek Shriman Ek Shrimati	Rama	
1969	Meri Bhabhi	Shanti	
1969	Vishwaas	Neena Kapoor	
1969	Waris	Rukmini	
1969	Yakeen	Rita's mother	
1970	Dharti	Janaki	
1970	Heer Raanjha	One of Ranjha's six sisters-in-law	
1970	Ishq Par Zor Nahin	Uma	
1970	Purab Aur Paschim	Ganga	
1970	Umang	Mrs. Rai Saheb	
1970	Yaadgaar	Bhanu's mother	
1971	Bikhre Moti	Sulochana	
1971	Uphaar	Anoop's mother	
1972	Haar Jeet	Aruna	Special Appearance
1972	Shor	Shankar's mother	
1972	Tangewala	Lakshmi	
1973	Anhonee	Mrs. Rai Bahadur Singh	
1973	Ek Mutthi Aasmaan	Kamini	
1973	Jaise Ko Taisa	Vijay's mother	
1973	Sherni		Punjabi film
1974	Prem Nagar	Rani Maa	
1974	Roti Kapda Aur Makaan	Bharat, Deepak & Vijay's mother	
1975	Apne Rang Hazaar	Sunil Kapoor's mother	
1975	Do Jhoot	Lalita & Usha	
1975	Qaid	Jai Saxena's mother	
1975	Sanyasi	Champa's Mother	
1976	Bhanwar	Rosy D'Souza	
1976	Do Shatru	Savitri	
1976	Dus Numbri	Radha	
1976	Kabeela	Champakali	
1976	Maha Chor	Mrs. Ajay Singh "Rani Maa"	
1976	Nehle Pe Dehla	Sunil's mother	
1977	Chandi Sona	Maya	
1977	Gyaani Ji		
1978	Aahuti	Kaushalya Prasad	
1978	Dil Aur Deewaar	Anand's mother	
1978	Heeralal Pannalal	Mrs. Premlal	
1978	Rahu Ketu	Chandramukhi	
1978	Swarg Narak	Vinod's mother	
1979	Ahinsa	Parvati	
1979	Bagula Bhagat		
1980	Takkar	Kaushalya	
1981	Khuda Kasam	Nirmala Singh	
1982	Naya Safar		
1982	Pyaas		
1983	Atyachar / Gulami Ki Zanjeerain	Kaanta	
1983	Painter Babu	Yashoda Srivastava	
1987	Jalwa	Kapil's mother	
1989	Santosh	Shanti	
1991	Deshwasi	Mrs. Singh	
1992	Hamshakal	Sunil's Mother	
1993	Gumrah	Sharda's Mother	
1990s	Children series for Doordarshan	Khel Khilone, Chaat Pani, Chand Sitare, Chandamama, Hari Bhari Phulwari	
2000	Har Dil Jo Pyar Karega	Biji	
2003	Chori Chori	Beeji	
2003	Hawayein		
2007	Laaga Chunari Mein Daag	Rohan and Vivaan's grandmother	
2013	Chennai Express	Neetu Mithaiwala	
2014	Purani Jeans		
2019	Kabir Singh	Sadhana Kaur	
2022	Laal Singh Chaddha	An elderly Sikh woman on the train	Final film

=== Television ===
Year	Title	Role	Notes
1984	The Jewel in the Crown	Aunt Shalini	Episode 1 and 2
2000	Gharwali Uparwali	Governess	
2005–2006	Shanno Ki Shaadi	Bebe	

== Bibliography ==
- Braham S. Sood; B. K. Karanjia (2000). An alien in Bollywood: an autobiography (of the spouse of Kamini Kaushal). UBS Publishers' Distributors. ISBN 9788174762764.
