= Elaan (1947 film) =

- Directed by: Mehboob Khan
- Written by: Zia Sarhadi
- Story by: Zia Sarhadi
- Produced by: Mehboob Khan Productions
- Starring: Surendra; Munawwar Sultana; Himalayawala; Zebunissa
- Cinematography: Faredoon Irani
- Edited by: Shamsudin Kadri
- Music by: Naushad
- Production company: Mehboob Khan Productions
- Distributed by: Mehboob Khan Productions
- Release date: 1947
- Country: India
- Language: Hindi/Urdu

Elaan (Hindi: ऐलान) is a 1947 Indian Bollywood Muslim social melodrama film. It was the sixth highest grossing Indian film of 1947. The film emphasises the need for education and is considered one of the best film in the genre of Muslim social.

== Cast ==
- Surendra
- Munawwar Sultana
- Himalayawala
- Zebunissa
