= Mere Bhagwan =

1947 Indian film

- Directed by: Mohan Sinha
- Produced by: Mohan Sinha; Murari Pictures
- Starring: Surendra; Madhubala
- Music by: Sajjad Hussain
- Release date: 1947
- Country: India
- Language: Hindi

Mere Bhagwan is a 1947 Indian Hindi-language social film, directed and produced by Mohan Sinha under the banner of Murari Pictures. It stars Surendra and Madhubala. The soundtrack features songs composed by Sajjad Hussain.

== Cast ==
According to 75 Glorious Years of Indian Cinema (1988):

- Surendra
- Madhubala
- Shashibala
- Shyam Sunder
- Wasti

== Production ==
Mere Bhagwan was announced by Murari Pictures in September 1946, alongside another Mohan Sinha production, Chittor Vijay. At the time of the announcement, actress Menka Devi was slated for the female lead. The film was promoted as a "new type" of entry in social genre.

By November 1946, reports indicated that the female lead role was being played by Madhubala. Having previously appeared only in juvenile roles, she was intended by Sinha to be introduced as a leading lady through Mere Bhagwan. However, she was simultaneously filming Kidar Sharma's Neel Kamal, which released earlier in 1947 and became her first credited appearance in a leading role.

== Soundtrack ==
The music for the film was composed by Sajjad Hussain.
