= Phool Khile Hain Gulshan Gulshan (TV series) =

- Genre: Talk show
- Presented by: Tabassum
- Original language: Hindi

Original release
- Network: DD National
- Release: 8 October 1972 – 1993

Phool Khile Hain Gulshan Gulshan was an Indian television talk show that was aired by national broadcaster Doordarshan from 1972 to 1993. It was the first talkshow of Indian television, and featured child actress-turned-host Tabassum interviewing famous Bollywood movie and television personalities. The format consisted of conversation interspersed with film scenes. In the 1980s, this was one of the main avenues for television advertisers to reach a broad Indian audience.

Doordarshan started its operations in Mumbai on 2 October 1972. Phool Khile Hain Gulshan Gulshan had its first episode aired a week later on 8 October 1972.
