= Chittor Vijay =

- Directed by: Mohan Sinha
- Starring: Raj Kapoor; Madhubala; Monica Desai
- Music by: Sachin Dev Burman
- Production company: Murari Pictures
- Release date: 7 June 1947
- Country: India
- Language: Hindi
- Box office: ₹ 12,00,000

Chittor Vijay is a 1947 Hindi language film directed by Mohan Sinha, featuring Raj Kapoor and Madhubala in the lead roles.

== Cast ==
- Raj Kapoor
- Madhubala as Sobhagya Devi
- Monica Desai
- Madan Puri

== Music ==
1. "Aaye Re Aaye Badal Jaise Chori"
2. "Ber Le Lo Ber"
3. "Har Zaban Par Ek Nara"
4. "Ho Rangoli Ho Rasila Rakhi Ka Din Aaya Re"
5. "Kahe More Mohan Ne Mujhko Bulaya"
6. "Mai Chumchum Karthi Bijli Hu"
7. "Naino Se Naino Ki Pyas Bujhao"
8. "Pi Lo Maharaja"
