= Dil Ki Rani =

1947 Indian Hindi-language film

- Directed by: Mohan Sinha
- Written by: Mohan Sinha
- Story by: Mohan Sinha
- Produced by: P. V. Banker
- Starring: Madhubala; Raj Kapoor
- Music by: Sachin Dev Burman
- Release date: 7 August 1947
- Country: India
- Languages: Hindi; Hindustani

Dil Ki Rani (transl. Queen of Hearts) is a 1947 Hindi-language film produced by P V Banker. The film is directed by Mohan Sinha. The film stars Raj Kapoor and Madhubala in lead roles along with Shyam Sunder, Badri Prasad and Munshi Khanjar. The film's music was composed by Sachin Dev Burman. The film was based on a story written by Mohan Sinha.

== Plot ==
Madhav is a poet whose songs are played on the radio. He is called Madho by his best friend Banke. Rajkumari, a great admirer of Madhav's songs asks her father a news paper publisher to publish his poems in the newspaper to increase readership of their newspaper. Soon she finds out Madhav and falls in love with him. On the day on which Rajkumari's father Thakur Sangram Singh comes to meet Madhav, an accident occurs and Rajkumari's sari gets burnt. It was in this occasion that Rajkumaris father enters the room and mistakes Banke for Madhav. He becomes very fond of Banke. Thakur finds many reasons to like Banke over Madhav, but fails to convince Rajkumari. Later Thakur accepts Rajkumari's wish in front of her with inner motives to separate the Madhav and Rajkumari. Together with the help of his assistant Munshi, Thakur tries different methods to separate them but fails miserably. Later Banke convinces Madhav to leave his lover for him for which Madhav agrees and acts insane in front of her.

== Cast ==
- Raj Kapoor as Madhav
- Madhubala as Rajkumari Singh
- Shyam Sunder as Banke Bihari
- Badri Prasad as Thakur Sangram Singh
- Munshi Khanjar as Munshiji
- Altaf as Mohini

== Soundtrack ==
- "O Duniya Ke Rahne Valo Bolo Kahan Gaya Chitchor (Part 1)" - Raj Kapoor
- "O Duniya Ke Rahne Valo Bolo Kahan Gaya Chitchor (Part 2)" - Geeta Dutt, Shyam Sundar
- “Mohabbat Ki Khana Kabhi Na Mittai” - Shyam Sundar
- “Aaha More Mohan Ne Mujhko Bulaaya” -Geeta Dutt
- “Aayenge Re Mere Man Ke Basaiyya Aayenge Re “ - Geeta Dutt
- “Bigadi Hui Takdeer Meri Aa Ke Bana De “-Geeta Dutt
- “Kyon Baalam Humse Rooth Gaye” - Geeta Dutt
- “Loot Liya Dil Chitchor Ne Chupke Se Aa Ke ” - Shyam Sundar
- “Sar Phod Phod Mar Jana”- Shyam Sundar

== Release and reception ==
The film opened in Bombay on 17 June 1949. It was reviewed in The Times of India on 2 July 1949.

Writing retrospectively in Upperstall, Karan Bali stated that Dil Ki Rani was a "creaky, tacky and stilted film". It found the performances of Kapoor and Madhubala "laughable" and "amusing", and the songs only passable fares.
