= Pammy Varma =

Indian film director

- Born: 30 May 1952; Bombay, India
- Died: 31 October 2015 (aged 63); Dubai, United Arab Emirates
- Other name: Rajesh Varma
- Occupation: Director
- Spouse: Sunita Varma (m. 1976)
- Children: Aman Varma; Kunal Varma
- Parent(s): Usha and Munshiram Varma

Pammy Varma (1952 – 2015) was an Indian film director in Bollywood. In a career spanning two decades, he worked as the assistant director/second-unit director of Manmohan Desai, leading director of the 1970s, before making his debut as the co-director of Mard (1985), which was the second highest-grossing film of 1985.

== Family background ==
Pammy Varma was the son of Usha and Munshiram Varma. He grew up in Bombay, India and graduated from the Don Bosco High School in Matunga, Bombay in 1968. Subsequently, he attended the Ruparel College, also in Matuga, Bombay, but gave up his college-life when he started working as the assistant director/second-unit director of Manmohan Desai, leading director of the 1970s.

Pammy had several affiliations with Bollywood for much of his life. Pammy's father, Munshiram Varma, and his five brothers founded Varma Films, known for box-office hits like Suhaag Raat (1948), Patanga (1949) and Badal (1951). Suhaag Raat was the seventh highest-grossing film of 1948; Patanga was the seventh highest-grossing film of 1949; and finally, Badal was the eighth highest-grossing film of 1951. Munshiram (Pammy's father) was also the producer of four films: Suhaag Raat, Thes (1949), Neki Aur Badi (1949) and Aurat (1953). Pammy's uncle, Bhagwan Das Varma (Munshiram's brother) was producer of Badal and Baghi Sipahi (1958) as well as the director of three films: Aurat, Pooja (1954) and Baghi Sipahi.

Other relatives in the Indian film industry include: Pammy's sister Madhu Makkar née Varma, who played the female lead in Insaaniyat (1974) opposite veteran actor Shashi Kapoor; Surinder Makkar, spouse of Madhu Makkar, who worked as a character actor in Insaaniyat and Pammy's brother, Sunil Varma, who was the executive producer of Insaaniyat. Finally, more relatives in the film industry include film and TV actors Sid Makkar and Giriraj Kabra. Sid Makkar is Pammy's nephew and Giriraj Kabra is the spouse of Pammy's niece, Seher Kabra née Varma.

== Film career ==
Pammy Varma started his career in Bollywood by working as the assistant director/second-unit director of Manmohan Desai in 1972 with two back-to-back films: Bhai Ho To Aisa (1972) and Raampur Ka Lakshman (1972). Both of these films were commercially successful. Raampur Ka Lakshman was the 10th highest-grossing film of the year, whereas Bhai Ho To Aisa was 11th highest- grossing film of the same year. For the next two years, each of the films for which Pammy worked for Manmohan Desai were also commercially successful. Aa Gale Lag Jaa (1973) was the tenth highest-grossing film of the year 1973 and Roti (1974) was the seventh highest-grossing film of the year 1974.

The banner year, both for the total number of films released as well as their commercial success, was the year 1977 : Amar Akbar Anthony was the highest-grossing film of the year; Dharam Veer was the second highest-grossing film of the year; Parvarish was the fourth highest-grossing film of the year; finally Chacha Bhatija was the fifth highest-grossing film of the year. All four films were released in 1977 and Pammy was the assistant director/second-unit director of Manmohan Desai for all four of them.

Box-office accomplishment was sustained for each of the four films for which Pammy continued to be Manmohan's assistant from 1979 through 1983. Suhaag (1979) was the highest-grossing film of the year 1979. Naseeb (1981) was the second highest-grossing film of the year 1981. Desh Premee (1982) was the tenth highest-grossing film of the year 1982. Finally, Coolie (1983) was the highest-grossing film of the year 1983.

Eventually, after working for Manmohan Desai for years, Pammy made his debut as the co-director of Mard (1985), which was the eighth highest-grossing film of the 1980s.

== Filmography ==
Year	Movie name	Cast	Notes
1972	Bhai Ho To Aisa	Jeetendra, Hema Malini, Shatrughan Sinha	
1972	Raampur Ka Lakshman	Randhir Kapoor, Rekha, Shatrughan Sinha	
1973	Aa Gale Lag Jaa	Shashi Kapoor, Sharmila Tagore, Shatrughan Sinha	
1974	Roti	Rajesh Khanna, Mumtaz, Vijay Arora	
1977	Parvarish	Amitabh Bachchan, Shammi Kapoor, Vinod Khanna, Neetu Singh, Shabana Azmi	
1977	Dharam Veer	Dharmendra, Zeenat Aman, Jeetendra, Neetu Singh	
1977	Chacha Bhatija	Dharmendra, Randhir Kapoor, Hema Malini, Yogeeta Bali	
1977	Amar Akbar Anthony	Amitabh Bachchan, Vinod Khanna, Rishi Kapoor, Parveen Babi, Neetu Singh, Shabana Azmi	
1979	Suhaag	Amitabh Bachchan, Shashi Kapoor, Rekha, Parveen Babi	
1981	Naseeb	Amitabh Bachchan, Shatrughan Sinha, Rishi Kapoor, Hema Malini, Reena Roy	
1982	Desh Premee	Amitabh Bachchan, Shammi Kapoor, Sharmila Tagore, Hema Malini, Parveen Babi	
1983	Coolie	Amitabh Bachchan, Rishi Kapoor, Rati Agnihotri, Waheeda Rehman	
1985	Mard	Amitabh Bachchan, Amrita Singh, Dara Singh	Co-Director
1988	Ganga Jamuna Saraswati	Amitabh Bachchan, Mithun Chakraborty, Meenakshi Sheshadri, Jaya Prada	
