= Munshiram Varma =

Indian film producer and distributor

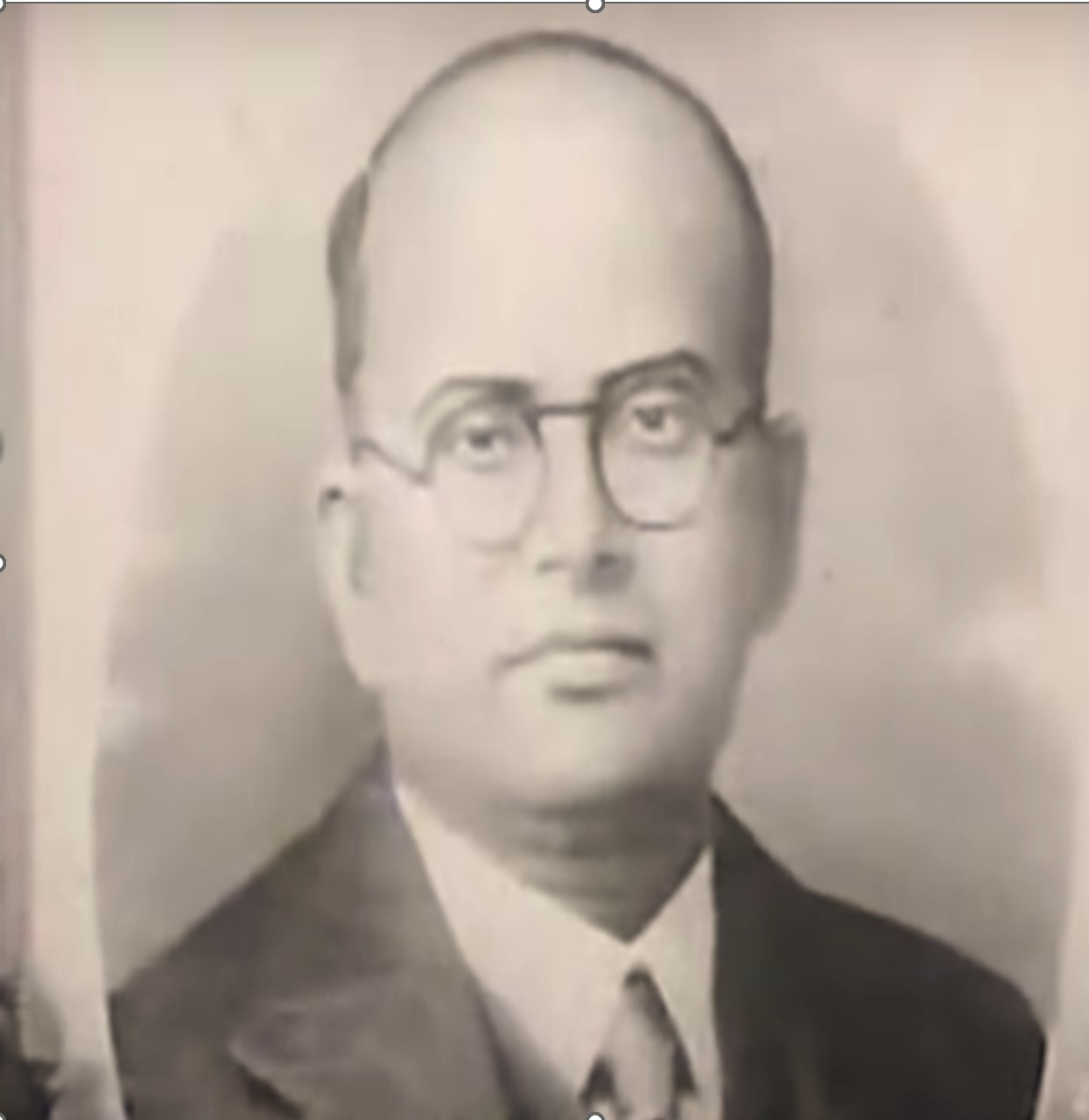
- Munshiram Varma in the 1950s
- Born: 1902; Punjab Province of British India.
- Died: 1958 (aged 56); Bombay, India
- Occupations: producer; distributor

Munshiram Varma (1902-1958) was a Bollywood film producer. He was one of six brothers that were founders/partners of Varma Films, a company predominantly involved with the production and distribution of Hindi-language films.

== Family ==
Munshiram Varma was born as Munshiram Chawla in the Punjab Province of British India. He was one of six sons born to Laxmidas and Hakumdai Chawla. The other five brothers were Ramrakha, Biharilal, Waltiram, Bhagwan Das and Santram. After moving to Bombay to enter the movie industry, the six brothers changed their last name to Varma.

Involvement in the Hindi language cinema was pursued by Munshiram as well as members of his immediate family. Madhu Makkar née Varma, daughter of Munshiram, played the female lead in Insaaniyat (1974) opposite veteran actor Shashi Kapoor. Surinder Makkar, spouse of Madhu Makkar and son-in-law of Munshiram, worked as a character actor in Insaaniyat.

More participation in the film industry from the children of Munshiram came from his sons Sunil and Pammy (a.k.a. Rajesh). Sunil Varma was the executive producer of Insaaniyat. Pammy Varma, was the co-producer of Mard (1985), which was the second highest-grossing film of 1985, and the eighth highest-grossing film of the 1980s (1980 to 1989). Furthermore, after years of working as the assistant director/second-unit director of Manmohan Desai, leading director of the 1970s, Pammy Varma made his debut as the independent director of Ek Misaal (1986).

Finally, a third generation of participation in the film industry comes from film and TV actors Sid Makkar and Giriraj Kabra. Sid Makkar is Munshiram's grandson and Giriraj Kabra is the spouse of Munshiram's granddaughter, Seher Kabra née Varma. Additionally, Chandan Arora, the recipient of the Filmfare Award for Best Editing, for the film Company (2002), which was eighth highest-grossing film of 2002, is married to Minal Arora, granddaughter of Munshiram Varma’s sister, Sumitra.

== Film career ==
Munshiram Varma began his career in the Indian film industry by working jointly with Kidar Sharma as a producer for the production company Oriental Pictures. The first film on which they worked together was Suhaag Raat (1948). It was also in the year 1948 that Munshiram, together with his five brothers, founded Varma Films and Suhaag Raat was the first film to be distributed by Varma Films. It was a great way for Munshiram to begin his career in the film industry because Suhaag Raat was a box-office hit; it was the seventh highest-grossing film of 1948.

The decision to hire Munshiram as a producer of Suhaag Raat was influenced by the film’s director, Kidar Sharma, who had developed a reputation for being the person to reach out to when one wanted to get a break in the film industry. For example, in 1947, the year before Suhag Raat was released, Kidar Sharma, as the producer of Neel Kamal, is credited with starting the acting careers of veteran stars Madhubala and Raj Kapoor. When Varma Films decided that the company would debut its entry into the film industry with distributing Suhaag Raat, Kidar Sharma took on Munshiram, a founding member of the company, as a co-producer of Suhaag Raat.

Given the success of Suhaag Raat, Oriental Pictures collaborated with Varma Films on two additional films, Thes (1949) and Neki Aur Badi (1949). Like Suhaag Raat, Thes was produced by Munshiram Varma and Kidar Sharma. To attempt to enhance the probability of commercial success, the producers of Thes not only used the same director, Kidar Sharma, of their recent hit film Suhaag Raat, but also used other members of Suhaag Raat’s ensemble in the film. Like in Suhaag Raat, the lead male actor of Suhaag Raat, Bharat Bhushan, played the lead role in Thes. Further, the music of Thes was composed by Snehal Bhatkar, the same person who had composed the music of Suhaag Raat. Whereas Thes did not achieve the commercial success that Suhag Raat achieved, Purnima, one of the film’s leading who would go on to act in a majority of films by Varma Films, was praised by Filmindia, one of the most popular magazines of its time, for her promising role in Thes.

As with Thes, to generate a prototype for commercial success, the Munshiram Varma and Kidar Sharma duo used an important member of Suhaag Raat’s ensemble in Neki Aur Badi. Filmindia, in its review of Suhaag Raat, referred to the film as "Geeta Bali's Sohag Raat", giving Geeta Bali much credit for its box-office success; Geeta Bali was cast in an important supporting role in Neki aur Badi by the Munshiram Varma and Kidar Sharma team. Finally, consistent with Kidar Sharma’s munificence with giving newcomers to the film industry a break, the Munsihram Varma and Kidar Sharma pair provided newcomer Roshan the opportunity to make his debut as a music director with Neki Aur Badi.

In addition to Geeta Bali, Madhubala was also cast for a leading role in "Neki Aur Badi" by the Munshiram Varma and Kidar Sharma duo. In the year just before the release of the film, Madhubala had earned her earliest critical and commercial achievement for the film Lal Dupatta (1948), which The Indian Express claimed had “put her in the top rung of heroines.” Further, two of Madhubala’s films released in the same year as "Neki Aur Badi" were box-office hits: Dulari (1949) was the eighth highest-grossing film of 1949 and Mahal (1949) was the third highest grossing film of the 1940s decade. Despite having promising stars like Geeta Bali and Madhubala, "Neki Aur Badi" was commercially unsuccessful. Mohan Deep, in his unofficial biography about Madhubala, claims that this lack of success for "Neki Aur Badi" indicates how thoughtless Kidar Sharma could be.” Not surprisingly, "Neki Aur Badi" marked the last time that the Munshiram Varma and Kidar Sharma pair worked together at producing a film.

The last film to be produced by Munshiram was Aurat (1953), a Hindi-language re-working of the Biblical tale of Samson and Delilah. Unlike, Suhaag Raat, Thes and Neki Aur Badi, which were produced by the Kidar Sharma and Munshiram Varma duo, Munshiram was the solo producer of Aurat. Also, unlike the Hollywood film Samson and Delilah directed by Cecil B. DeMille, Aurat was not successful at the box office.

In addition to the above four films, Varma Films (the company founded by Munshiram and his five brothers) produced and distributed the following six films: Patanga, Sagai (1951), Badal (1951), Parbat (1952), Ladla (1954) and Pooja (1954). Of these six films, two were commercially successful. Patanga was the seventh highest-grossing film of 1949. and Badal was the eighth highest-grossing film of 1951.

Munshiram died in 1958 ending a prolific film career that lasted for over a decade and averaged about one movie produced and/or distributed each year.

== Filmography ==
Year	Film	Role
1948	Suhaag Raat	As Producer and also as Partner/Founder of Varma Films
1949	Thes	As Producer and also as Partner/Founder of Varma Films
1949	Neki Aur Badi	As Producer and also as Partner/Founder of Varma Films
1949	Patanga	As Partner/Founder of Varma Films
1951	Badal	As Partner/Founder of Varma Films
1951	Sagai	As Partner/Founder of Varma Films
1952	Parbat	As Partner/Founder of Varma Films
1953	Aurat	As Producer and also as Partner/Founder of Varma Films
1954	Ladla	As Partner/Founder of Varma Films
1954	Pooja	As Partner/Founder of Varma Films
