= Bhagwan Das Varma =

Indian film producer, distributor and director

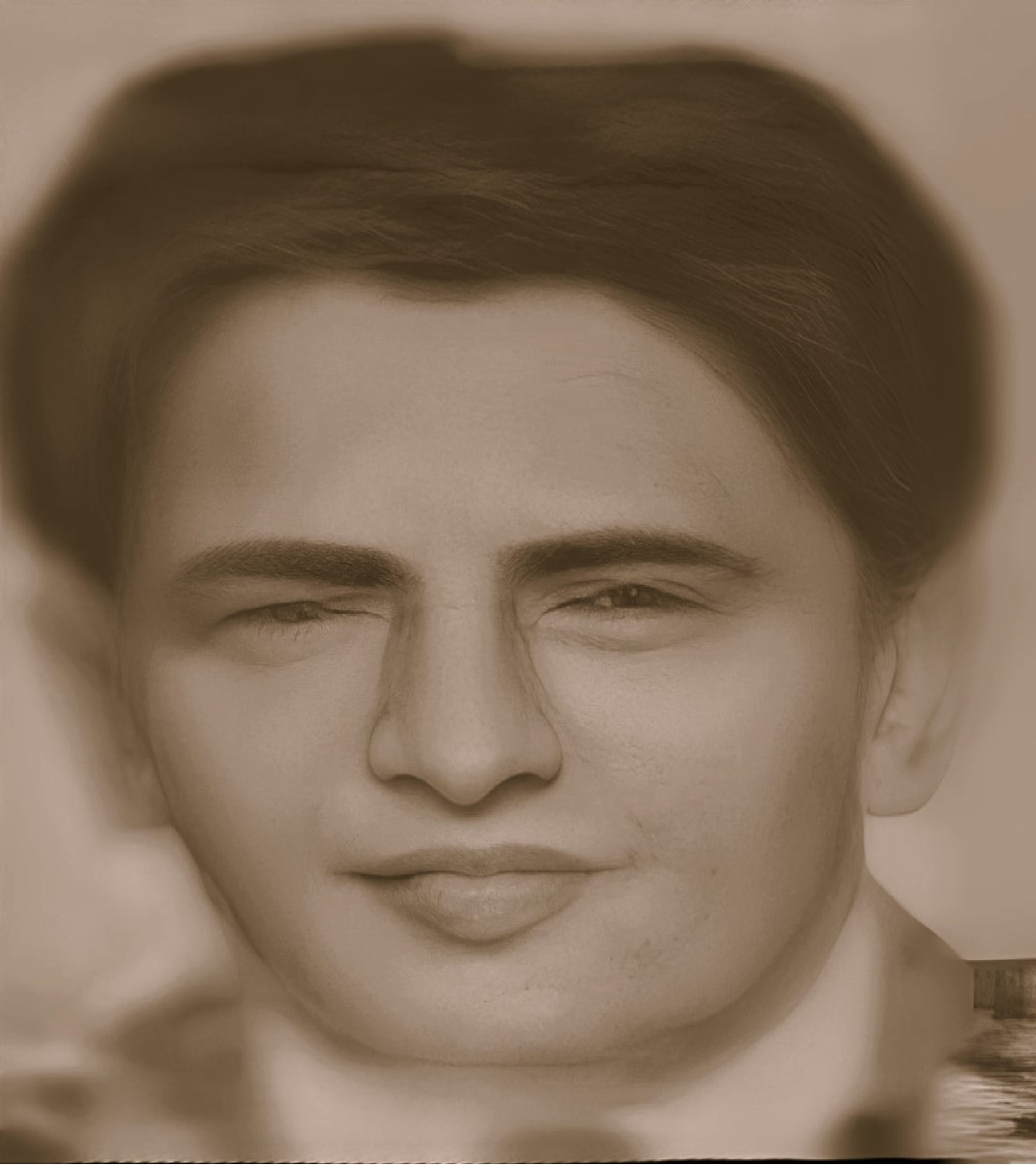
- Bhagwan Das Varma in the 1950s
- Born: 1907; Punjab Province of British India.
- Died: 1962 (aged 55); Bombay, India
- Occupations: producer; distributor; director
- Spouses: Tarawanti (m. 1935); Purnima (m. 1954)
- Relatives: Varma family Shirin Mohammad Ali (sister-in-law)

Bhagwan Das Varma (1907–1962) was a Bollywood film producer and director. He was one of six brothers that were founders/partners of Varma Films, a company predominantly involved with the production and distribution of Hindi language films. After the Varma Films banner was retired in the mid-1950s, Bhagwan Das continued his film production and distribution activities with two affiliated companies: Varma Pictures and V. P. Productions.

During his 11-year career span, starting from its inception with the release of the film Suhaag Raat in 1948, to the release of his last film, Main Nashe Mein Hoon in 1959, Bhagwan Das Varma directed 3 films: Aurat (1953), Pooja (1954) and Baghi Sipahi (1958). A sample of the careers of 3129 movie directors shows that about 63% directors made only one movie, and only about 7% directors made 3 or more movies. A more recent but smaller sample of the careers of 193 movie directors shows that about 34% directors make only one movie and only about 14% made 3 or more movies. With Bhagwan Das’s career including 3 movies as a director, the above comparison benchmarks are indicators of the notability of Bhagwan Das arising from his prolific directional proclivity.

== Family ==
Bhagwan Das Varma was born as Bhagwan Das Chawla in the Punjab Province of British India. He was one of six sons born to Laxmidas and Hakumdai Chawla. The other five brothers were Ramrakha, Munshiram, Biharilal, Waltiram and Santram. After moving to Bombay in the late 1940s to enter the movie industry, the six brothers changed their last name to Varma, and debuted with the release of their first film, Suhaag Raat (1948), distributed under the banner of Varma Films.

In 1954, Bhagwan Das married actress Purnima, who had worked in a majority of the films produced by Varma Films; it was Purnima’s second marriage.

Involvement in the Indian film industry was pursued by Bhagwan Das and Purnima as well as members of their immediate family. Jagdish Varma, son of Bhagwan Das from his previous marriage, started a new production and distribution company called J.V. Film Enterprises associated with two films: Insaaniyat (1974) and Oonch Neech Beech (1989). Jagdish and his brother Satpal Varma were the producers of Insaaniyat whereas Jagdish was the producer of Oonch Neech Beech and Satpal the co-producer.

Purnima Das Varma’s son from her first marriage, Anwar Hashmi, worked as a character actor in Baharon Ki Manzil (1968).

Particularly prominent among the descendants of Bhagwan Das is Emraan Hashmi, a film actor. He is the grandson of Purnima Das Varma; Purnima’s son from her first marriage, Anwar Hashmi, is Emraan’s father making Bhagwandas Varma step grandfather of Emraan.

== Film career ==
Bhagwan Das Varma began his film career as one of the founders/partners of Varma Films, a company that produced and distributed Indian films. The company started its distribution house with the film Suhaag Raat (1948) and its production house the next year with the film Patanga (1949). Both films were commercial successes. Suhaag Raat was the seventh highest-grossing film of 1948 and Patanga was the seventh highest-grossing film of 1949.

In the next several years that followed these box-office hits, Bhagwan Das and his brothers produced and/or distributed the following films: Thes (1949), Neki Aur Badi (1949), Sagai (1951), Badal (1951), Parbat (1952), Aurat (1953), Ladla (1954) and Pooja (1954). After the Varma Films banner was retired in the mid-1950s, Bhagwan Das together with his surviving brothers continued his film production and distribution activities with affiliated companies. V P Productions was associated with Baghi Sipahi (1958), and Varma Pictures with Night Club (1958) and Main Nashe Mein Hoon (1959).

In addition to playing the above roles with Varma Films and affiliated companies, Bhagwan Das made his debut as a producer with Badal in 1951. Like Sohaag Raat and Patanga, Badal was a commercial success. Badal was the eighth highest-grossing film of 1951. Badal was motivated by the 1938 American film The Adventures of Robin Hood. In the Indianized version of the Robin Hood legend, a Jagirdar’s henchmen loot poor villagers until Badal (played by Premnath) steals from the oppressor and helps the repressed while getting into a romantic relationship with the tyrant’s daughter Ratna (played by Madhubala). The film received mixed reviews with the performance of Premnath, the lead actor in Badal, being described as being a little too loud whereas Madhubala generally being praised for her performance as the Jagirdar’s daughter. Mohan Deep, in his unofficial biography about Madhubala, describes the romantic relationship that developed during the filming of Badal that may have helped in the commercial success of the film.

Furthermore, Bhagwan Das made his debut as a director in 1953 with the film Aurat. The film’s plot was a re-working of the Biblical tale of Samson and Delilah. Aurat was released shortly after the release of the American film Samson and Delilah, a commercially successful film directed by Cecil B. DeMille with a box-office revenue of $25.6 million and a budget of only 3.1 million. Unlike its American version, Aurat was not successful at the box office. Aurat also marked the first time Purnima worked in an important role under the direction of Bhagwan Das.

Pooja was Bhagwan Das’s second film as director and his only film for which he wrote the screenplay. Purnima was cast as the main female lead in the film. It was the first film in which Purnima, who had previously worked in character roles for various movies for Varma Films, worked as the leading actress playing the role of a child widow. The film revolved around the controversial issue of remarriage of Indian women in general and, more specifically, remarriage by widows. Portrayals of widows in the Indian Cinema have been documented by various scholars. "Young or old," as has been noted, a widow "will be dressed in white. She will wear no makeup or jewelry. She is treated as a cursed person responsible for her husband’s death. She has no right to any happiness and will never be allowed to remarry." Portrayals of widow remarriages in the Indian cinema during the 1950s were rare, making the film a daring depiction of the romantic pursuit of a widow by the male lead.

The last film to be directed by Bhagwan Das was Baghi Sipahi. The film was loosely based on the 1951 American film Quo Vadis, which in turn was adapted from the 1896 book with the same title by Henryk Sienkiewicz. Quo Vadis was commercially very successful. It was on the highest grossing film of 1951, with a box-office revenue of $21.2 million and a budget of only $7.6. Given the low budget of Baghi Sipahi, despite being a historical drama film and the well-documented relationship between box-office revenues and budgets in academic studies, Baghi Sipahi was not commercially successful. In addition to directing Baghi Sipahi, Bhagwan Das also produced this film. Once again Purnima, who was by this time married to Bhagwan Das, played an important role in the film. What made this last directional endeavor of Bhagwan Das notable was that this was the first time he was directing Madhubala, who was playing the lead female role in the film. Madhubala has been designated one of the greats in Indian cinematic history, and her status has withstood the test of time in the decades following her death. In 1958 alone, the year in which Baghi Sipahi was released, Madhubla was the lead actress in four films (Phagun, Kala Pani, Chalti Ka Naam Gaadi and Howrah Bridge) that were all on the list of the ten highest grossing films of the year 1958. Although not on this list of highest grossing films, Baghi Sipahi is considered one of the most "memorable films" of Madhubala.

== Filmography ==
Year	Film	Role
1959	Main Nashe Mein Hoon	As Partner/Founder of Varma Pictures
1958	Night Club	As Partner/Founder of Varma Pictures
1958	Baghi Sipahi	As Producer & Director and also as Partner/Founder of V.P. Productions
1954	Pooja	As Director and also as Partner/Founder of Varma Films
1954	Ladla	As Partner/Founder of Varma Films
1953	Aurat	As Director and also as Partner/Founder of Varma Films
1952	Parbat	As Partner/Founder of Varma Films
1951	Badal	As Producer and as Partner/Founder of Varma Films
1951	Sagai	As Partner/Founder of Varma Films
1949	Patanga	As Partner/Founder of Varma Films
1949	Neki Aur Badi	As Partner/Founder of Varma Films
1949	Thes	As Partner/Founder of Varma Films
1948	Suhaag Raat	As Partner/Founder of Varma Films
