= Varma Films =

Indian film production and distribution company

- Industry: Entertainment
- Founded: 1948
- Founders: Six brothers in the Varma family (Ramrakha, Munshiram, Bhagwan Das, Biharilal, Walatiram and Santram)
- Headquarters: Bombay, India
- Products: Film production Film distribution

Varma Films was a film production and distribution company founded in Bombay, India. The company was predominantly involved in producing and distributing Hindi-language films and to a lesser extent distributing some Italian-language films with English subtitles in India.

During its 18-year existence, starting from its inception with the release of the film Suhaag Raat in 1948, to the release of its last film, Budtameez in 1966, Varma Films and its affiliates distributed 18 films, of which 15 were Hindi-language films and the remaining 3 were Italian-language films. This corresponds to an average of one film per year. In his sample of 274,991 films with 269,385 individual producers over the years 1949 to 2018, film researcher Stephen Follows finds that the average producer starting out in 1950 would go on to produce 6 films over their career span. With 18 of the films distributed by Varma Films and its affiliates including 12 films produced by the company, the above benchmark is an indicator of the notability of Varma Films arising from their prolific productivity.

In addition, the prominence of Varma Films and its affiliates emanates from the notable array of stars that worked in its films during the so-called Golden Age of Hindi Cinema that stretched for the first two decades following India's independence in 1947. Three of these films (Neki Aur Badi (1949), Badal (1951) and Baghi Sipahi (1958)) starred Madhubala, called “the biggest star in the world” by David Cort of Theatre Arts Magazine. Another film (Main Nashe Mein Hoon (1959)) featured Raj Kapoor, one of the greatest and most influential actors and filmmakers in history of Indian cinema. Other distinguished stars that acted in the films linked with Varma Films and its affiliates includes Nutan, Mala Sinha, Sadhana, Geeta Bali, Kamini Kaushal, Rehana, Bharat Bhushan, Shyam, Premnath, Ashok Kumar and Shammi Kapoor. Similarly, the noteworthy stars that worked in the Italian-language films distributed by the affiliates of Varma Films includes Sophia Loren, Anita Ekberg, Romy Schneider, Ursula Andress and Marcello Mastroianni.

Further contributing to the significance of Varma Films are the directors who worked in the films produced and/or distributed by the filmmakers. Extant research on film directors shows that director talent, as measured by the total number of films directed during a director's entire career, has a significant effect on the financial and critical success of their films. Furthermore, academic research also finds that it is only when a director makes at least 7 films that one can conclude that the director's talent transcends sheer luck. The prolific directors who worked for the Hindi-language films produced and/or distributed for Varma Films as well as its affiliates and the total number of movies made by these directors during their entire careers (shown in parentheses) includes Amiya Chakrabarty (14 films), Ravindra Dave (28 films), Manmohan Desai (20 films), O.P. Dutta (9 films), H. S. Rawail (21 films), Kidar Sharma (32 films), and Naresh Saigal (11 films). Likewise, the prolific directors who worked in the Italian-language films distributed by the affiliates of Varma Films, and the total number of movies made by these directors during their entire careers (shown in parentheses), includes Vittorio De Sica (31 films), Frederico Fellini (26 films), Elio Petri (19 films) and Luchino Visconti (21 films). Overall, these numbers corroborate the talent of the directors that worked for films associated with Varma Films and its affiliates.

Finally, given the belief that a film's songs are a crucial ingredient of the box-office success of any mainstream Indian film, the prominence of Varma Films comes from the songs in its films. For a majority of the films produced by Varma Films and its affiliates, the songs were composed by Shankar-Jaikishan, a composer duo who are widely considered to be one of the greatest ever music composers of the Hindi film industry. More evidence on the noteworthiness of the songs composed by the Shanker-Jaikishan duo for Varma Films and its affiliates comes from Binaca Geetmala, the radio countdown show hosted by the iconic Ameen Sayani. With its blend of chart-topping Hindi filmi songs and Sayani's distinctive style, the show captured the hearts of listeners and became a rage across the Indian subcontinent. The song Zahid Sharab Pine De Masjid Me Baithkar from the film Main Nashe Main Hoon, ranked number 2 on Binaca Geetmala's Annual list of Top Songs for 1959. Further, the song, Budtameez Kaho Ya Kaho Jaanvar from the film Budtameez ranked number 10 on Binaca Geetmala's Annual list of Top Songs for 1966. Interestingly, what is probably the most memorable song in a film produced by Varma Films was the evergreen song Mere Piya Gaye Rangoon composed by another renowned composer C. Ramchandra for Patanga (1949), a film produced by Varma Films.

== History ==
Founded in 1948 by six brothers in the Chawla family (Ramrakha, Munshiram, Bhagwan Das, Biharilal, Walatiram and Santram), born to Laxmidas and Hakumdai Chawla from the Punjab Province of British India. After moving to Bombay to enter the movie industry, the six brothers changed their last name to Varma, became a part of the Varma family, and named their newly founded company Varma Films.

=== 1940s ===
Varma Films was initially involved only with distributing films and afterward with producing as well as distributing Hindi-language films. The first film distributed by the company was Suhaag Raat (1948). Kidar Sharma, the film's director, had been looking for a financier/distributor for Oriental Pictures, a film company that he had founded a few years ago. When Varma Films offered to take on the distribution rights for Suhaag Raat, Kidar Sharma made Munshiram Varma, one of the founders of Varma Films, a co-producer of Suhaag Raat. The story of Suhaag Raat revolved around a love triangle between Bharat Bhushan, Begum Para and Geeta Bali, the three leading stars of the film. The film's music was composed by Snehal Bhatkar. Suhaag Raat was a box-office hit; it was the seventh highest-grossing film of 1948. Much of the film's success was attributed to Geeta Bali's breakthrough performance in the film.

Given how well Suhaag Raat did at the box-office, Varma Films and Oriental Pictures collaborated on two more films: Thes (1949) and Neki Aur Badi (1949). The narrative of both films once again centered around love triangles and both films were directed by Kidar Sharma as well as produced for Oriental Pictures by Kidar Sharma and Munshiram Varma. Thes starred Shashikala and Bharat Bhushan in lead roles with Purnima in a supporting role, whereas Neki Aur Badi featured Madhubala, Geeta Bali and Kidar Sharma in the lead roles. Neither of these two films were commercially successful. However, both films were recognized for other contributions. For her role in Thes, Purnima, was praised by Filmindia, for "promising a good future." and for making “a good impression” Further, renowned music composer Roshan made his debut as a music director in Neki Aur Badi.

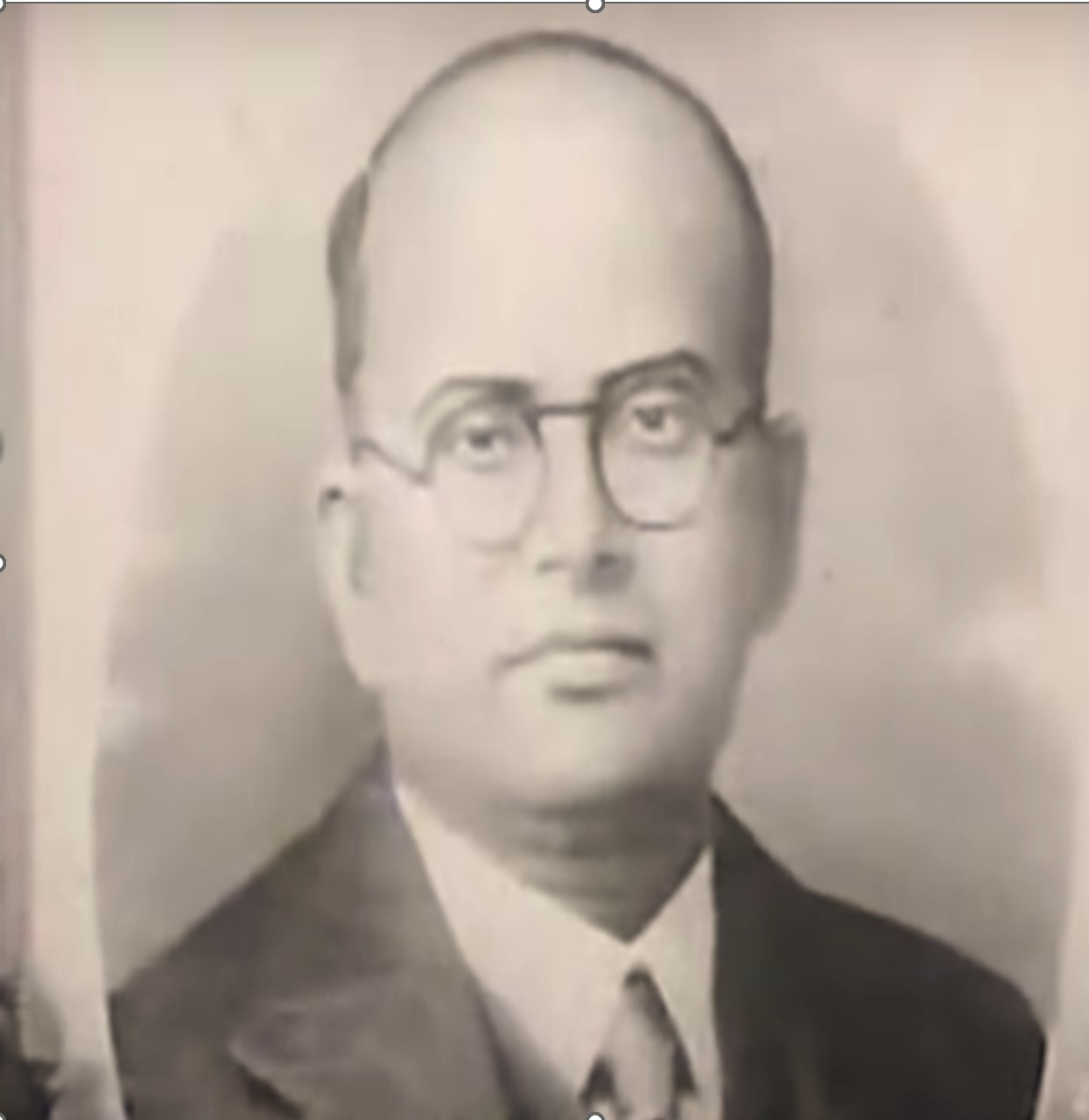
Munshiram Varma in the 1950s

Kidar Sharma, the director of all three films discussed above was credited by renowned filmmaker Raj Kapoor as “a one-man institution who taught me all I know about film-making.” Likewise, Munshiram Varma, the most prominent founder of Varma Films in the 1940s, after working as a co-producer in three movies with Kidar Sharma, developed the skills needed to lead Varma Films into its maiden venture as a production and distribution company with the film Patanga (1949). Starring Nigar Sultana and Shyam in the lead roles with supporting roles performed by Yakub, Gope and Purnima, the film was directed by H. S. Rawail with its music being composed by C. Ramchandra. Famous actor Rajendra Kumar, regarded as one of the greatest actors of the Indian cinema, debuted in the film industry with a cameo in the film. Patanga was a major commercial success; it was the seventh highest-grossing film of 1949.

=== 1950s ===
The 1950s decade began with Varma Films releasing two films in 1951. Among these was Sagai (1951), previously titled Ek Nazar. Following the commercial success of their film Patanga (1949), Varma Films once again hired H. S. Rawail to direct and C. Ramchandra to compose the music of the film. Rehana, the film's female lead, was at that time in the best phase of her career being paired with the top heroes of the time and Sagai turned out to be one of her two biggest hits. Premnath, the film's male lead, made his first of several collaborations with Varma Films. Purnima was once again cast in a supporting role. As in Patanga, Rajendra Kumar, worked in Sagai as an assistant to director H. S. Rawail. The other film released by Varma Films in the same year as Sagai's release, was Badal, an Indian adaptation of Robin Hood, the legendary outlaw who supposedly stole from the rich to give to the poor. Bhagwan Das Varma, one of the founders of the Varma Films, made his debut as a film producer with this film. Starring Madhubala and Prem Nath in lead roles with Purnima in a supporting role, the film was directed by Amiya Chakravarty. It was also the first film where Varma Films collaborated with the Shankar–Jaikishan duo for the composition of the film's music. The film was a phenomenal commercial success; Badal was the eighth highest-grossing film of 1951.

The company's next film was Parbat (1952) featuring Prem Nath and Nutan in lead roles with K. N. Singh and Purnima in supporting roles. The film's narrative centered around what happens to the two lovers, played by the film's lead stars, when a former lover—who is insanely obsessive—enters their lives. Directed by O.P. Dutta, the film's music was composed by the Shanker Jaikishan duo. Varma Films subsequently released Aurat (1953), a period film, which was a retelling of the Samson and Delilah biblical tale. The film featured Prem Nath and Bina Rai in the lead roles with Purnima in a supporting role. The Shanker Jaikishan duo composed the musical score for the film. Bhagwan Das Varma, one of the founders of Varma Films, made his directorial debut with Aurat.

The company's first film for 1954 was the comedy Ladla (1954) whose story uncovered the experiences of the protagonist as he ventures out into the world leaving behind all the privileges arising from being the favorite son of wealthy parents. Starring Karan Dewan and Shyama in the lead roles, the film was directed by Surya Kumar. Ladla's musical compositions, which were composed by Vinod, are regarded as one of his best-known creations. Ladla was followed by and Pooja (1954) starring Bharat Bhushan and Purnima. It was directed by Bhagwan Das Varma with music composed by the Shanker Jaikishan duo. Bold for its time, the film dealt with issues related to the remarriage of Indian child widows. Pooja was the first film in which Purnima, who had previously worked in supporting roles for several films associated with Varma Films, worked in the leading role portraying a child widow. In the same year that Pooja was released Bhagwan Das Varma married Purnima.

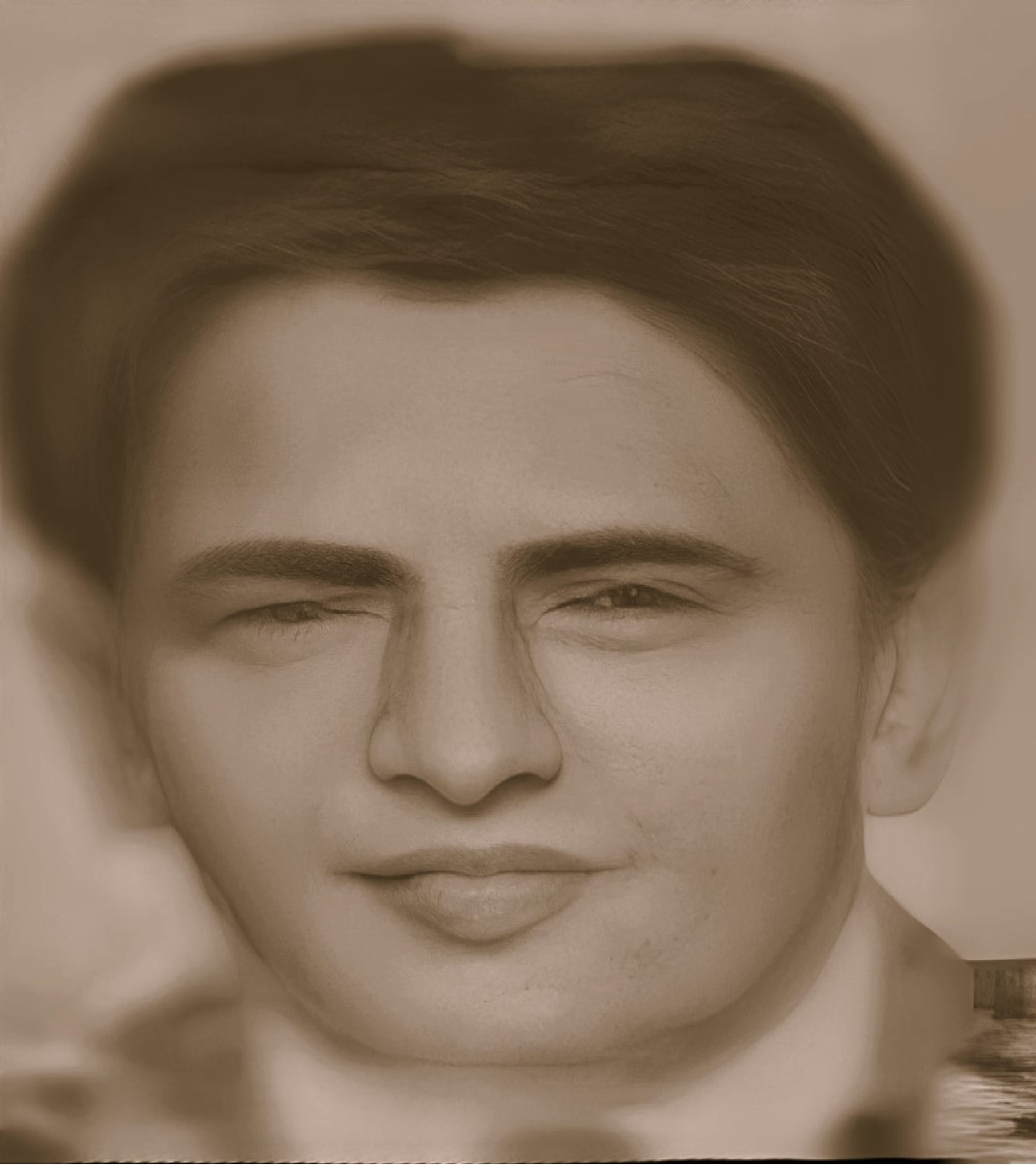
Bhagwan Das Varma in the 1950s

During the latter half of the 1950s, the Varma Films banner was retired following the death of one of its founders, Munshiram Varma, in 1958. Varma Films subsequently evolved into two affiliated companies, both associated with the production and distribution of films for the rest of the 1950s decade. V P Productions was connected with Baghi Sipahi (1958) whose narrative revolved around the persecution of Christians by the Roman Empire. Bhagwan Das Varma worked as the producer as well as the director for Baghi Sipahi and the music for the film was composed by the Shankar–Jaikishan duo. Madhubala and Chandrashekhar played the lead roles of the film. Varma Pictures, the other affiliated company associated with Varma Films, was the production/distribution company for two films. The first of these was Night Club (1958). The narrative of this film unraveled the challenges faced by a female protagonist when she attempts to avenge the murder of her brother by an omnipotent criminal. Starring Kamini Kaushal and Ashok Kumar in the lead roles, the film was directed by Naresh Saigal with music composed by Madan Mohan. The second film associated with Varma Pictures, also directed by Naresh Saigal, was Main Nashe Mein Hoon (1959). The story of this film centered around the descending consequences of heavy drinking and the ameliorating role that family can play in subduing these effects. Raj Kapoor and Mala Sinha played the lead roles and the Shankar–Jaikishan duo composed the film's music.

Overall, whereas Munshiram was the most prominent member of the six founders in the 1940s, Bhagwan Das was the most noteworthy member in the 1950s. However, they also had distinct roles within Varma Films and its affiliates. Munshiram was the co-producer, along with Kidar Sharma, for three movies (Suhaag Raat, Thes and Neki Aur Badi) in the 1940s for which Oriental Pictures was the production company, and Varma Films was the distributor. Bhagwan Das, on the other hand, was the solo producer for two movies (Badal and Baghi Sipahi) and the solo director for three movies (Aurat, Pooja and Baghi Sipahi), all produced and distributed by Varma Films and its affiliates.

Also different were the approaches to storytelling associated with Munshiram and Bhagwan Das. All three of the movies which Munshiram co-produced in the 1940s had contemporary plots based on love triangles that were marked by unrequited love. In contrast, both movies produced by Bhagwan Das were historical, and two out of the three movies directed by Bhagwan Das were also historical, all based on epic tales including those of Samson and Delilah and the persecution of Christians during the Roman Empire.

=== 1960s ===
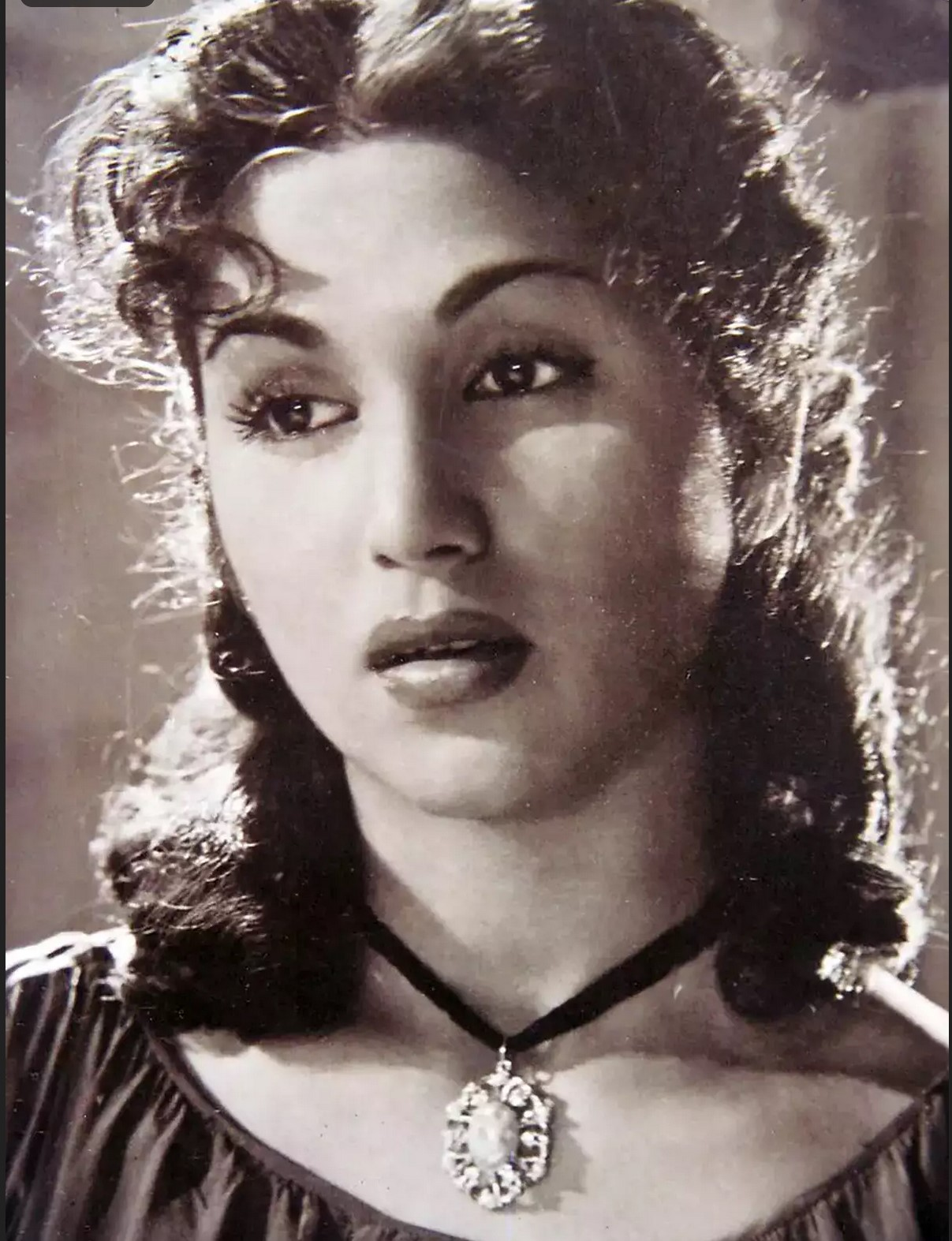
Purnima Das Varma

After the death of one of the original founders of Varma Films, Bhagwan Das Varma in 1962, the company continued its film production and distribution activities with two more affiliated companies in the 1960s. Varma Productions, was associated with the thriller Ankh Micholi (1962) whose story revolved around the unusual case of the female lead in the film being accused of two consecutive murders that she presumably did commit. The film featured Mala Sinha and Shekhar in the lead roles and was directed by Ravindra Dave with music composed by Chitragupt. Varma Brothers, the other affiliated company formed in the 1960s co-produced and co-distributed the film Budtameez along with Filmistan. Starring Shammi Kapoor and Sadhana, the film was directed by renowned director Manmohan Desai. The music for Budtameez, composed by the Shanker Jaikishan duo, was the seventh and last collaboration between the duo and Varma films and its affiliates. Budtameez also marked the ninth and last time Purnima worked in a film connected with Varma Films and its affiliates. Purnima (now Purnima Das Varma) continued to work in films subsequently; in a career spanning more than five decades, beginning in the mid-1940s into the mid-1990s, Purnima appeared in over 150 Hindi-language films.

Spearheaded by Rajinder Varma, son of founder Biharilal Varma, Varma Brothers teamed up with Italian producer Carlo Ponti in the 1960s to theatrically distribute three English-subtitled Italian films in India. The first of these films was Boccaccio '70 (1962). Originally, Boccacio 70 had four segments, each with different directors and stars, but one of these segments, directed by Mario Monicelli, was removed in the version released in India as well as other countries outside Italy, presumably to reduce the length of the film. The first of the three remaining segments, titled The Temptation of Dr Antonio, revealed the challenges faced by a puritanical champion of public respectability as he crusades against a billboard of a curvaceous model suggesting that people drink more milk. Starring Peppino De Filippo and Anita Ekberg in the lead roles, this segment was directed by Federico Fellini, who has been frequently hailed as one of the greatest directors of all time by BFI's Sight & Sound poll held every decade. Notably, in 2002, BFI's directors' poll ranked him the second greatest director ever while the critics' poll placed him at seventh. The second segment, titled The Job, describes the responses taken by a young Contessa when she discovers that her husband, the Count, has been sleeping around with expensive call girls. Starring Romy Schneider and Tomas Milian, this segment was directed by Luchino Visconti. Finally, the third segment of Boccacio 70, titled The Raffle, reveals what happens when a timid sacristan wins a raffle to spend a night with an attractive shooting-gallery attendant. Directed by Vittorio De Sica, the lead role in this segment was played by Sophia Loren.

After Boccacio 70, the next Italian film distributed by Varma Brothers was Marriage Italian Style (1964). Starring Sophia Loren and Marcello Mastroianni, the film was directed by Vittorio De Sica. The narrative of the film revolved around an on-again, off-again relationship between the lead stars spanning over two decades. Finally, the last Italian film distributed by Varma Brothers was The 10th Victim (1965). Starring Ursula Andress and Marcello Mastroianni, the film was directed by Elio Petri. The story of this film is centered around a future where participants of a "Big Hunt" game are divided into "hunters" and "victims." The hunter needs to track down and kill their assigned a victim while the victim needs to assassinate the hunter before the hunter does the same. Of the three Italian films distributed by Varma Brothers, two were commercially successful in Italy. Specifically, on the List of highest-grossing films in Italy, Marriage Italian Style ranked 38th and Boccaccio '70 ranked 104th. Despite performing below producer Carlo Ponti's expectations in Italy, The 10th Victim apparently achieved the success he was hoping for when the film was distributed worldwide.

The 1960s decade was also marked by the gradual entry of the children of the six founders of Varma Films into the film industry in various roles. A new production company, Varma International Pictures, was started by the sons of Biharilal Varma, one of the founders of Varma Films. The new company produced and distributed a Punjabi-language film called Laiye Tod Nibhaiye (1966), with each of Biharilal's sons performing a different role in the film. Satish Varma was the film's executive producer, Kuldip Varma the production controller, Ashok Varma the production-in-charge and Kishanlal Varma the producer. Further, Aroon Varma, son of founder Santram Varma, another one of the founders of Varma Films, was the Public Relations Officer for Budtameez whereas Jagdish Varma, son of Bhagwan Das Varma, still another founder of Varma Films, was the producer of the same film. Also, Baldevraj Varma, son of Ramrakha Varma, another founder of Varma Films, started working as a first assistant camera for renowned award-winning cinematographer Nariman Irani. Finally, Purnima Das Varma's son from her first marriage, Anwar Hashmi, worked as a character actor in Baharon Ki Manzil (1968).

Overall, the most noteworthy contributions to the 1960s decade were made by the children of Biharilal Varma, one of the founders of Varma Films, when they teamed up to produce a Punjabi-language film at a time when the role of Varma Films and its affiliates in the production and distribution of Hindi-language films began to wane. Furthermore, another son of Biharilal, Rajinder Varma, started venturing into the distribution of subtitled Italian-language films in India. These films were significant because of being partly or fully directed by Vittorio De Sica, Frederico Fellini, and Luchino Visconti, and because of featuring stars including Sophia Loren, named by the American Film Institute, as one of the greatest stars of classical Hollywood cinema

=== 1970s and beyond ===
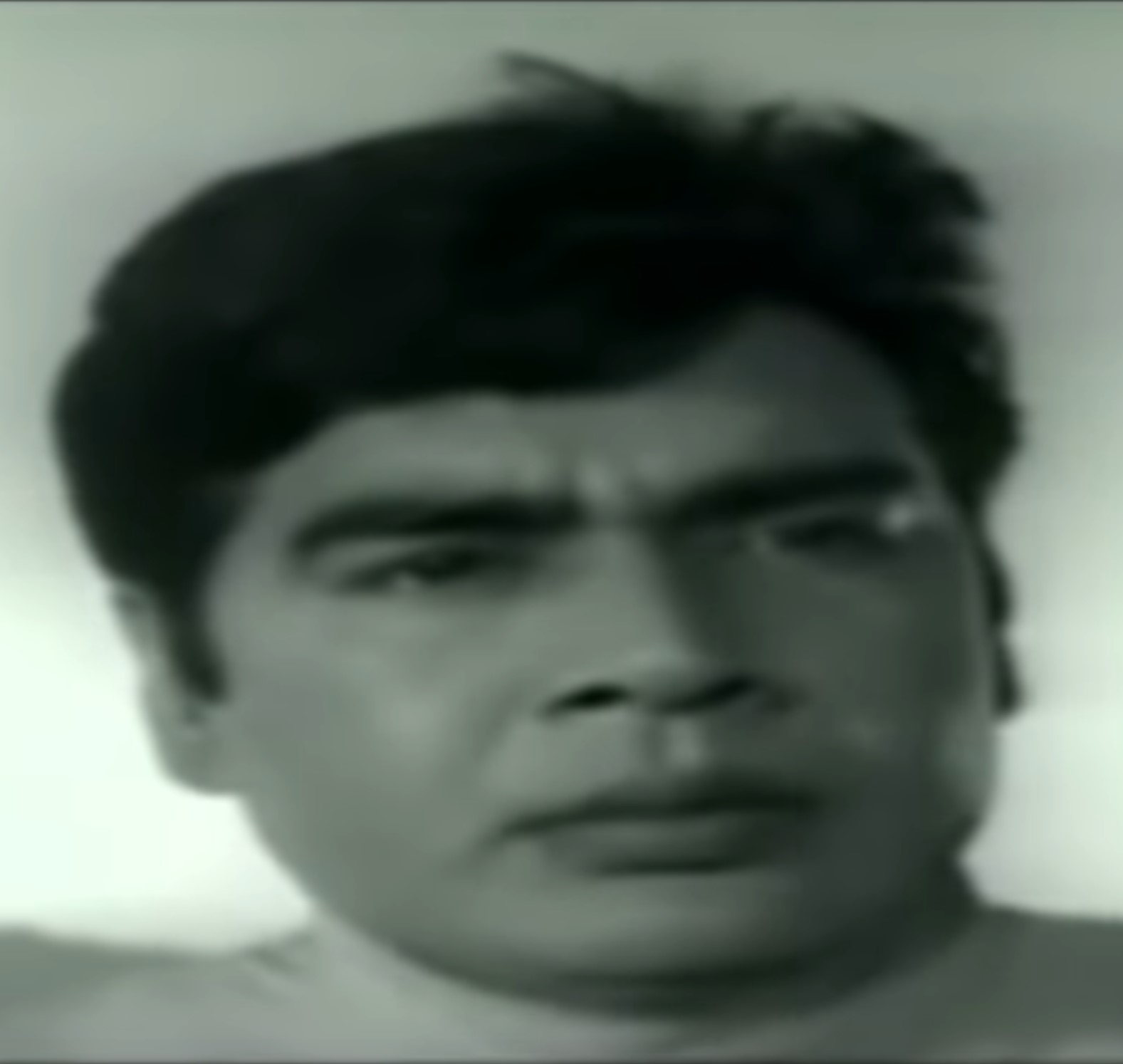
Sujit Kumar in 1962

The 1970s decade was distinguished by an acceleration of participation in the film industry by the children of the founders of Varma Films. Jagdish Varma, son of Bhagwan Das Varma, one of the founders of Varma Films, started a new production and distribution company called J.V. Film Enterprises associated with Insaaniyat (1974) and Oonch Neech Beech (1989). Jagdish and his brother Satpal Varma were the producers of Insaaniyat whereas Jagdish was the producer of Oonch Neech Beech and Satpal the co-producer. Shajoo Varma, Jagdish Varma's spouse was the production designer of Oonch Neech Beech. Aroon Varma, son of Santram Varma, also one of the founders of Varma Films, started a new production company called Varma Film Enterprises and produced Balidaan (1971). Kiran Singh née Varma, daughter of Santram Varma, married actor and producer Sujit Kumar, who in a career spanning four decades, was regarded as the first superstar of the Bhojpuri cinema. Together with Sujit, Kiran established a new production company called Shiv Bhakti Films and produced Anubhav (1986), Asmaan Se Ooncha (1989), and Khel (1992). Surinder Kumar Sharma, spouse of Kusum Sharma née Varma, daughter of Walatiram Varma, another founder of Varma Films, started a new production company called Advent Movies and produced Chala Murari Hero Banne. Madhu Makkar née Varma, daughter of Munshiram Varma (still another founder of Varma Films), played the female lead in Insaaniyat opposite veteran actor Shashi Kapoor; Surinder Makkar, spouse of Madhu Makkar, worked as a character actor in Insaaniyat. More participation from the children of Munshiram Varma came from his sons Sunil and Pammy. Sunil Varma was the executive producer of Insaaniyat. After years of working as the assistant director/second-unit director of Manmohan Desai, leading director of the 1970s, Pammy Varma made his debut as the co-director of Mard (1985), which was the second highest-grossing film of 1985, and the eighth highest-grossing film of the 1980s.

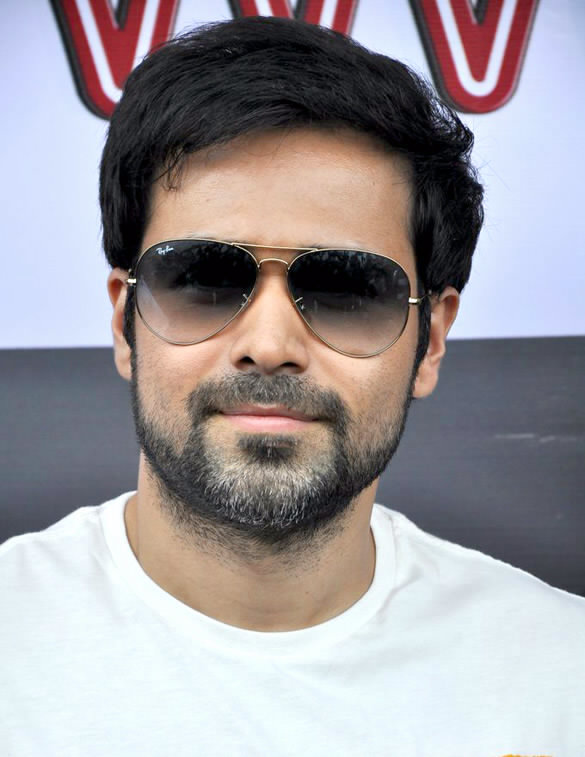
Emraan Hashmi

A third generation of participation comes from the grandchildren of the six Varma brothers that founded Varma Films. Most prominent among the members of this generation is Emraan Hashmi, a film actor. He is the grandson of Purnima Das Varma who had married Bhagwan Das Varma, one of the founders of Varma Films. Purnima's son from her first marriage, Anwar Hashmi, is Emraan's father, making Bhagwandas Varma Emraan's step grandfather. Other participation comes from Chandan Arora, film editor/director and recipient of the 2003 Filmfare Award for Best Editing, who is the spouse of Minal Arora, granddaughter of Sumitra Varma, sister of the six Varma brothers that founded Varma Films. Chandan Arora, together with Minal Arora, founded Make Films, one of the production companies associated with the films Main, Meri Patni Aur Woh (2005) and Striker (2010), with Chandan also serving as producer for Striker. More involvement in the film industry comes from producer/director Kawal Sharma who is married to Sabina Sharma née Varma, granddaughter of Bhagwan Das Varma, one of the founders of Varma Films and daughter of Jagdish Varma. Further, Sachin Sharma, grandson of founder Walatiram Varma, started working as an assistant director for Filmcraft, a production company owned by producer/director Rakesh Roshan and his son, actor Hrithik Roshan. Still more film industry participation comes from two more participants, Jatin Kumar and Rajiv Menon, both associated with founder Santram Varma. Jatin Kumar, grandson of Santram Varma, and son of Sujit Kumar and Kiran Singh née Varma, is one of the producers of Aetbaar (2004). Rajiv Menon, movie screenplay writer, is the spouse of Dimple Varma, granddaughter of Santram Varma.

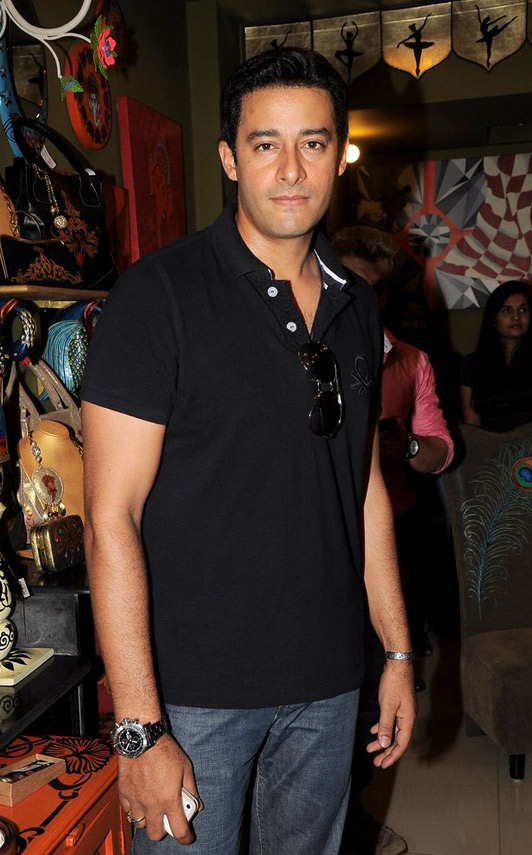
Zulfi Syed

Finally, more involvement comes from the grandchildren of the six original founders of Varma Films, including Sid Makkar, Giriraj Kabra, Tom Hunkele, Amit Varma, Mihika Varma, Mishkat Varma and Zulfi Syed, who have expanded into other sectors of the entertainment industry—including television, theater, music, and sports. Sid Makkar is the grandson of Munshiram Varma, one of the founders of Varma Films and Giriraj Kabra is the spouse of Seher Kabra née Varma, granddaughter of Munshiram Varma. Sid Makkar is an actor working in film, television, and theater whereas Giriraj Kabra works primarily in television. Tom Hunkele, spouse of Rachel Hunkele (granddaughter of Munshiram Varma), holds a prominent position in the sports sector of the entertainment industry. He serves as the Vice President of Sports Medicine and the Head Athletic Trainer of the Philadelphia Eagles and was recently honored for his pivotal contribution to the team's triumph in Super Bowl 2025. Amit Varma, grandson of Biharilal Varma, a founder of Varma Films, is best known for featuring in TV shows like Baa Bahoo Aur Baby, Teri Meri Love Stories, and Badi Door Se Aaye Hain. Likewise, also working largely in television are sister and brother, Mihika Varma and Mishkat Varma, grandchildren of Waltiram Varma, another founder of Varma Films. Further, Zulfi Syed, who is married to Sheena Syed née Varma, granddaughter of Santram Varma (also one of the founders of Varma Films), worked as an actor and is now a renowned disc jockey. Most recently, Kabeer Arora, grandson of Sumitra Varma, sister of the six brothers that founded Varma Films, and son of Minal and Chandan Arora, became the first in the fourth generation of the family to join the entertainment industry by serving as the music composer of the series Kanneda, premiering on OTT in 2025. Collectively these contributions of the third and now fourth generations illustrate how members continue their involvement in films but have also moved into other sectors of the entertainment industry, creating a new narrative of Varma Films today and into the future.

== Filmography ==
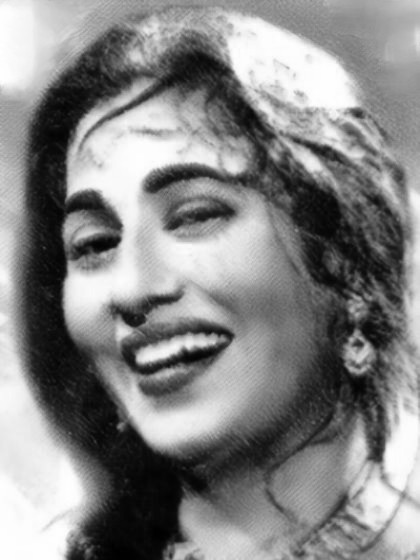
Madhubala played leading roles in three films associated with Varma Films

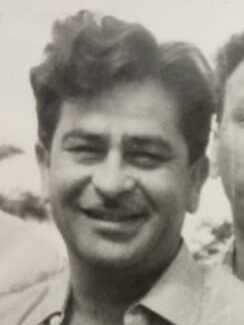
Raj Kapoor played a leading role in a film by Varma Films

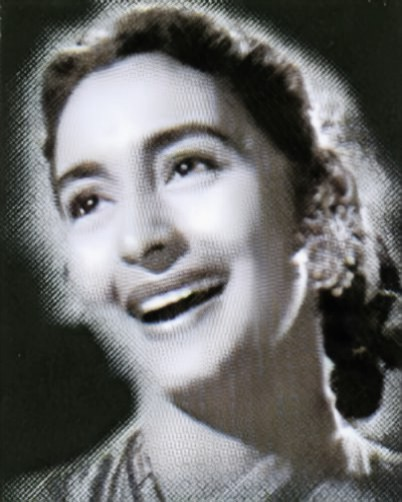
Nutan played a lead role in a film by Varma Films

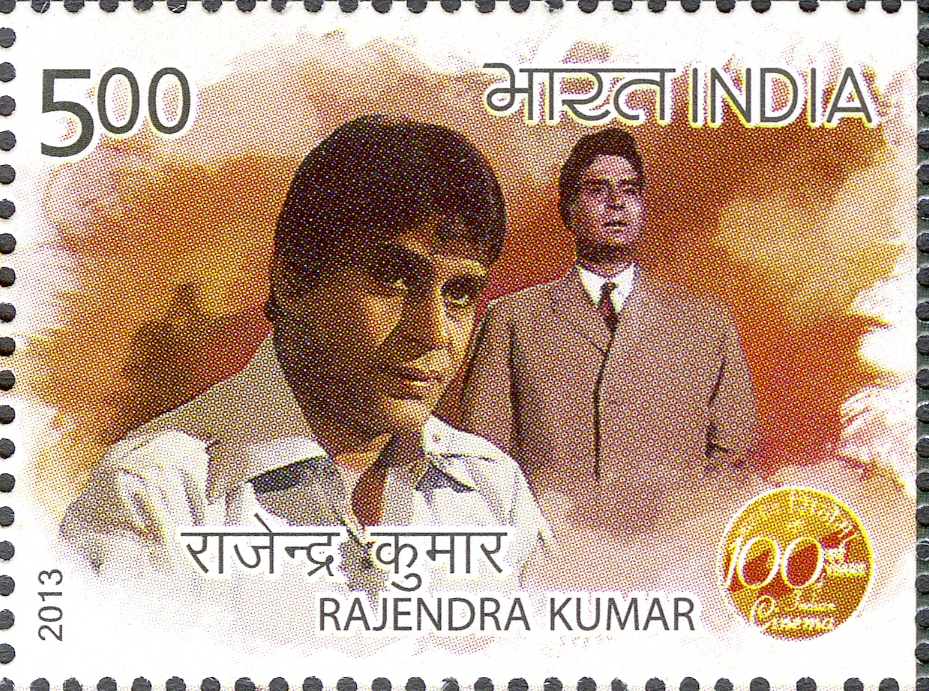
Rajendra Kumar collaborated with Varma Films two times

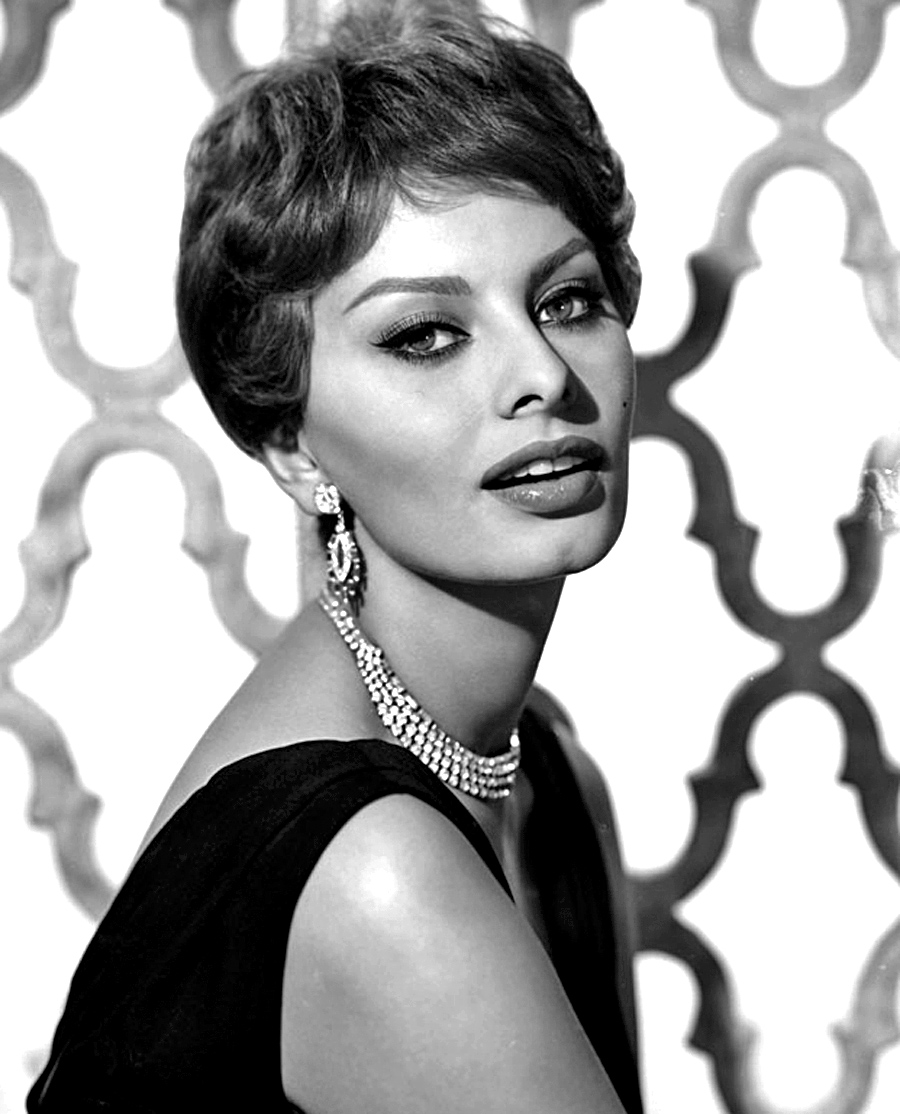
Sophia Loren played lead roles twice in films distributed by Varma Brothers, an affiliate of Varma Films

(Hindi-language films produced and distributed by Varma Films as well as affiliated firms. Films only distributed by Varma Films or affiliates are marked with a *)

Year	Title	Company credit	Notes
1948	Suhaag Raat*	Varma Films; Oriental Pictures	First film distributed only by Varma Films. Oriental Pictures was the production company. Produced for Oriental Pictures by Munshiram Varma, one of the founders of Varma Films.
1949	Thes*	Varma Films; Oriental Pictures	Oriental Pictures was the production company. Varma Films was the distribution company. Produced for Oriental Pictures by Munshiram Varma, one of the founders of Varma Films.
1949	Neki Aur Badi*	Varma Films; Oriental Pictures	Oriental Pictures was the production company. Varma Films was the distribution company. Produced for Oriental Pictures by Munshiram Varma, one of the founders of Varma Films.
1949	Patanga	Varma Films	First film produced and distributed by Varma Films.
1951	Sagai	Varma Films	
1951	Badal	Varma Films	Produced by Bhagwan Das Varma, one of the founders of Varma Films.
1952	Parbat	Varma Films	
1953	Aurat	Varma Films	Produced by Munshiram Varma; Directed by Bhagwan Das Varma; both were two of the founders of Varma Films.
1954	Ladla	Varma Films	
1954	Pooja	Varma Films	Directed by Bhagwan Das Varma, one of the founders of Varma Films.
1958	Baghi Sipahi	V. P. Productions	V. P. Productions was a company affiliated with Varma Films. Produced and directed by Bhagwan Das Varma, one of the founders of Varma Films.
1958	Night Club	Varma Pictures	Varma Pictures was a company affiliated with Varma Films.
1959	Main Nashe Mein Hoon	Varma Pictures	Varma Pictures was a company affiliated with Varma Films.
1962	Ankh Micholi	Varma Productions	Varma Productions was a company affiliated with Varma Films.
1966	Budtameez	Varma Brothers; Filmistan	Varma Brothers was a company affiliated with Varma Films. Varma Brothers and Filmistan were the production companies for Budtameez, with Varma Brothers handling the Indian distribution and Filmistan controlling the release for in the rest of the world. Produced by Jagdish Varma, son of Bhagwan Das Varma, one of the founders of Varma Films.

(Italian-language films distributed by Varma Brothers, an affiliate of Varma Films, for theatrical release only in India.)

Year	Title	Company credit	Notes
1962	Boccaccio '70	Varma Brothers	First Italian-language film distributed by Varma Brothers, an affiliate of Varma Films
1964	Marriage Italian Style	Varma Brothers	Second Italian-language film distributed by Varma Brothers, an affiliate of Varma Films
1965	The 10th Victim	Varma Brothers	Last Italian-language film distributed by Varma Brothers, an affiliate of Varma Films
