= Suhaag =

Suhaag or Suhag (lit. 'wifehood') may refer to:

- Suhaag (1958 film), 1958 Indian Hindi-language film starring Gemini Ganesan and Shivaji Ganesan
- Suhag, a 1972 Pakistani film
- Suhaag (1979 film), 1979 Indian Hindi-language action drama film by Manmohan Desai, starring Amitabh Bachchan and Shashi Kapoor
- Suhaag (1994 film), 1994 Indian Hindi-language romantic-drama film by Kuku Kohli, starring Ajay Devgan and Akshay Kumar
- Suhaag (2015 film), 2015 Indian Bhojpuri-language film

== See also ==
- Suhag Raat, Indian wedding night ritual of the consummation of marriage
- Suhaag Raat, 1948 Indian film
- Suhaag Raat (1968 film), 1968 Indian film by R. Bhattacharya, starring Rajshree and Jeetendra
- Suhaagan, 1986 Indian film
- Suhaagan (TV series), an Indian drama television series
