= Aurat (1953 film) =

1953 film

- Directed by: Bhagwan Das Varma
- Written by: Bhagwan Das Varma (screenplay); Agha Jani Kashmiri, Balkishen Mauj, Ratilal Thakar (story)
- Produced by: Munshiram Varma
- Starring: Prem Nath; Bina Rai; Purnima
- Cinematography: Jamshed Irani
- Edited by: Pandurang S. Khochikar
- Music by: Shankar Jaikishan
- Production company: Varma Films
- Distributed by: Varma Films
- Release date: April 3, 1953; (India)
- Running time: 172 minutes
- Country: India
- Language: Hindi

Aurat (Hindi for "Woman") is a 1953 Hindi movie starring Prem Nath, Bina Rai and Purnima.Aurat was produced and distributed by Varma Films. Munshiram Varma, one of the founders of Varma Films, made his debut as a producer for the film. Previously, Munshiram Varma co-produced three films— Suhaag Raat, Thes and Neki Aur Badi —with Kidar Sharma for Oriental Pictures, a company founded by Kidar Sharma. Bhagwan Das Varma, another founder of Varma Films, made his debut as a director for Aurat.

The ancient saga of Samson and Delilah served as the foundation for Aurat's innovative narrative adaptation. What sets Aurat apart from other cinematic retellings of Samson and Delilah is its incorporation of songs, a crucial element for mainstream Indian cinema's box office success. Aurat's soundtrack was composed by the legendary duo Shankar Jaikishan. Their involvement adds significant cinematic value to Aurat, as Shankar-Jaikishan are widely regarded as one of the greatest music composers in the history of Hindi cinema. By combining a well-known Biblical tale with the musical prowess of Shankar-Jaikishan, Aurat creates a unique cinematic experience that blends cultural storytelling with the rich tradition of Indian film music.

== Plot ==
Aurat's narrative skillfully weaves elements from the Samson and Delilah story, crafting a new tapestry from this Biblical thread. In this Hindi-language version, the plot begins with an introduction to Adil, who plays Samson. Adil is a man of gigantic strength who lives in a village with his widowed mother. One day, the military commander of the king, comes to Adil's village and informs the villagers that they will need to perform forced labor to build a new palace for the king.

During the confrontations that take place, Adil drives the commander and his allies away but, in the process, an old man dies. As Adil cradles the dying man, he promises him he will take care of his daughter Ruhi. Subsequently, Ruhi moves in with Adil and his mother and, as time passes, Ruhi falls in love with Adil. With the introduction of Ruhi into the tale, Aurat's retelling presents a unique element into the Samson and Delilah saga

The story picks up with the arrival of Juhi, who is betrothed to the king and will be playing the role of Delilah. On a hunting trip, Juhi and the king are separated; a lion appears from a cave and starts stalking Juhi. Adil, who happens to be in the area, single-handedly wrestles with the lion and rescues the king's betrothed from the lion. This earns him the gratitude of the beautiful Queen-in-waiting, Juhi. The king, pleased with Adil, gives him an important assignment in his army, and promises that Adil's fellow-villagers will not face forced labor from his army.

Juhi is impressed by Adil and over time this impression turns to love, and she tells Adil about this. Adil does not think it appropriate for a betrothed to be his lover and wife, and spurns her. Infuriated by Adil's response, Juhi starts to plot against Adil, by getting the king to once again impose forced labour from Adil's village. This angers Adil, who goes to confront the king and the queen-in-waiting. The king dismisses Adil, and orders his arrest. Adil flees to the hills. Numerous attempts by the king's armies to apprehend Adil are in vain. Finally, Juhi tells the king that she will bring Adil back and make him her prisoner.

When the king agrees, Juhi goes off to the hill where Adil is camping and sets up camp over there with her maid, Yasmin. Adil finds Juhi in the camp and gradually succumbs to her charms, falling in love with her. While spending time together, he confesses to her that the secret to his strength was his long hair which, if cut, would make him lose his strength. So, Juhi drugs Adil and while he his fast asleep, she cuts his hair and hands him to the king's guards. The movie progresses in this retelling of the Samson and Delilah tale, apprising audiences with what ultimately happens to Adil, Juhi, Ruhi and the king.

== Cast ==
- Bina Rai as Juhi
- Prem Nath as Adil
- Purnima as Ruhi
- Ulhas as The King
- Hiralal as the Military Commander
- Roopmala as Yasmin

== Soundtrack ==
Music was composed by Shankar Jaikishan, while Hasrat Jaipuri and Shailendra wrote the lyrics.

#	Title	Singer	Lyricist
1	"Dard-E-Jigar Thaher Zara"	Lata Mangeshkar	Shailendra
2	"Nainon Se Nain Huwe Char"	Lata Mangeshkar	Hasrat Jaipuri
3	"Ulfat Ka Saaz ChhedSuna Suna"	Lata Mangeshkar	Hasrat Jaipuri
4	"Suna Suna Hai Jahan"	Lata Mangeshkar	Hasrat Jaipuri
5	"Dard-E-Ulfat Chhupaon Kahan"	Lata Mangeshkar	Shailendra
6	"Apne Lut Jaane Ka Gham Bewafa Ne Diya Gham"	Lata Mangeshkar	Hasrat Jaipuri
7	"Aankhon Aankhon Mein"	Lata Mangeshkar	Hasrat Jaipuri
8	"Yeh Duniya Banayi Hai Kis Bereham Ne"	Lata Mangeshkar	Shailendra

== Release ==
Aurat was released shortly after the release of the Hollywood film Samson and Delilah directed by Cecil B. DeMille. Unlike its Hollywood version, Aurat was not successful at the box office.

Immediately following the release of the film,Prem Nath and Bina Rai who had fallen in love during the filming of Aurat, got married. Also, the year following the release of Aurat, the film's director Bhagwan Das Varma married Purnima, who played an important role on Aurat as well as earlier films made by Varma Films.
