= Baghi Sipahi (1958 film) =

1958 film by Bhagwaan Das Varma

- Poster
- Directed by: Bhagwan Das Varma
- Produced by: Bhagwan Das Varma
- Starring: Madhubala; Ranjan; Chandrashekhar; Purnima
- Edited by: Dharam Vir
- Music by: Shankar–Jaikishan
- Production company: V.P. Productions
- Distributed by: V.P. Productions
- Release date: February 27, 1958; (India)
- Running time: 160 minutes
- Country: India
- Language: Hindi

Baghi Sipahi (Hindi for "Rebel Soldier") is a 1958 Indian Hindi-language film directed by Bhagwan Das Varma and starring Madhubala, Ranjan, Chandrashekhar and Purnima. It is loosely based on the novel Quo Vadis (Latin for "Where are you going?") by Nobel Laureate Henryk Sienkiewicz, which has been adapted for the screen several times, including a 1951 American version that was nominated for several Academy Awards. Baghi Sipahi was distributed and produced by V.P. Productions, an affiliate of Varma Films.

Baghi Sipahi’s narrative centers around the Roman Empire’s clash with Christianity and the harassment of Christians in its empire. Prominent among the persecuted Christians was the character played by Baghi Sipahi’s lead actress Madhubala, who in the early 1950s had been called “the biggest star in the world” by David Cort of Theatre Arts Magazine. Baghi Sipahi was the third collaboration between its filmmakers and Madhubala. Previously Madhubala and the filmmakers had collaborated in Neki Aur Badi (1949), for which Varma Films was the distributor, and Badal (1951), for which Varma Films was both the producer and the distributor. Baghi Sipahi was, however, the first time that Bhagwan Das Varma, one of the founders of Varma Films, had directed Madhubala.

Baghi Sipahi’s distinctiveness arises from its creative fusion of East and West in cinema. The film transplants the epic struggle between the Roman Empire and early Christianity onto Indian soil, reimagining it through the prism of Bollywood conventions. The filmmakers vision comes to life not just through its narrative of love and rebellion, but also through its musical soul, composed by the legendary Shankar-Jaikishan. Their soundtrack transforms the ancient Roman setting into a uniquely Indian experience, demonstrating how music can transcend cultural and historical boundaries. By marrying a classic tale of persecution and faith with the melodic traditions of Indian cinema, Baghi Sipahi creates a cinematic tapestry that is both familiar and at the same time refreshingly novel.

While Baghi Sipahi has joined the category of lost films with no known surviving copies, its songs—vital to an Indian film's commercial appeal—continue to exist in audio form. Also, some film stills of Baghi Sipahi survive and are available from the external links below. Finally, still surviving are visual video clips of two of the film’s songs.

== Plot ==
Baghi Sipahi presents an intriguing cinematic portrayal of the ancient conflict between the Roman Empire and Christianity, reimagined through the unique lens of Indian cinema. The film intertwines historical and fictional characters to capture the essence of love, sacrifice, and the fight for justice amidst tyranny.

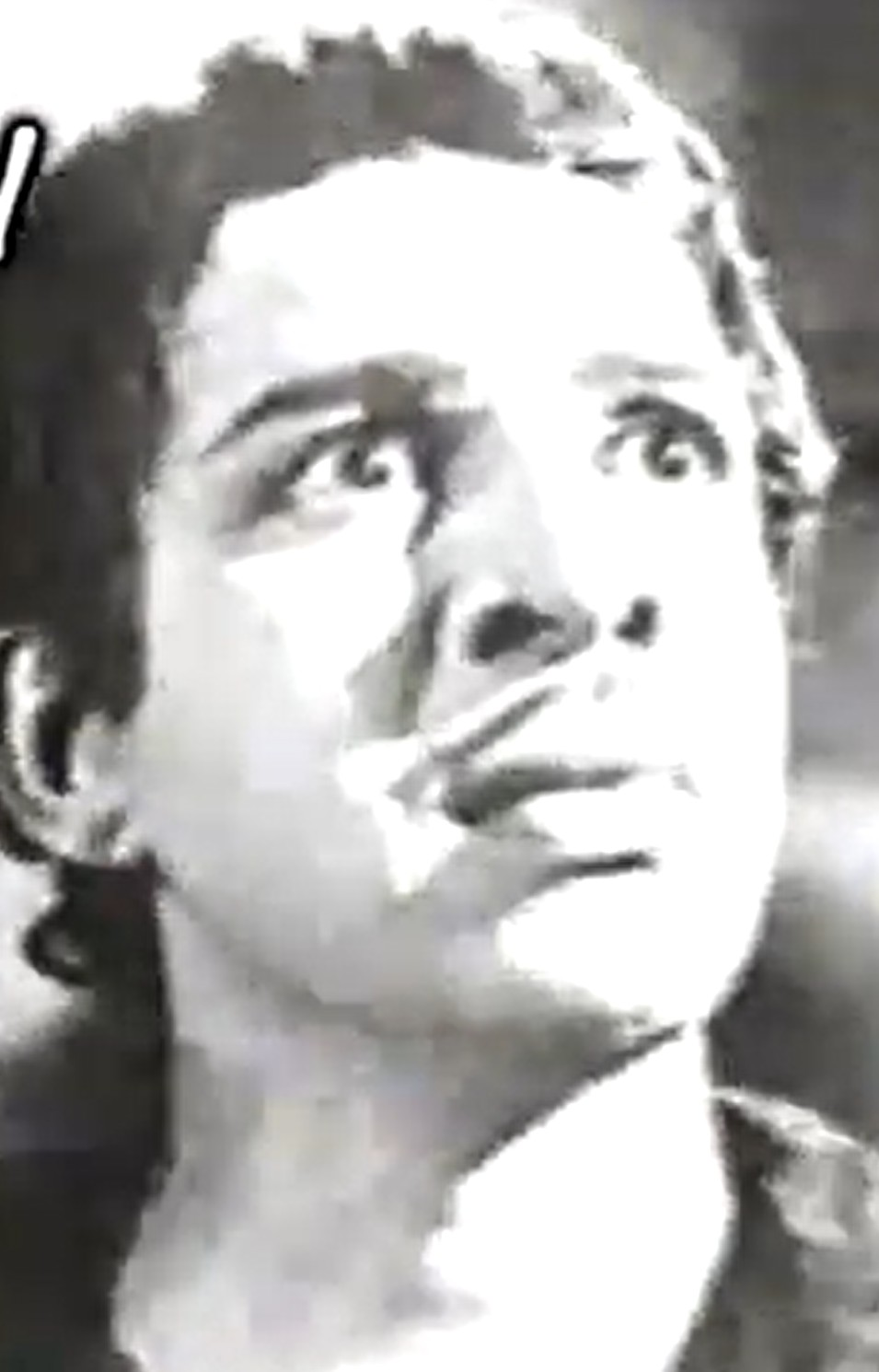
Ranjan in Baghi Sipahi (1958)

The story is set against the backdrop of Emperor Nero's tyrannical reign, marked by the persecution of Christians. Key historical figures include Emperor Nero himself, his manipulative wife Poppaea, and Acte, a palace slave who once harbored unrequited love for Nero. Alongside these historical characters, the film introduces two key fictional figures: a Roman military commander and Ranjana, a devout Christian.

The narrative begins with the Roman military commander returning from war and discovering Ranjana, who is held as a hostage by the Emperor. Driven by his admiration for her, the commander persuades Nero to allow Ranjana to be with him as a reward for his service. Though initially resistant and resentful of the arrangement, Ranjana’s feelings gradually evolve into love for the commander, bringing a semblance of peace to their lives amidst the overarching turmoil.

As the Emperor's persecution of Christians intensifies, the kingdom is set ablaze, and Christians are wrongfully blamed for the disaster. Poppaea's influence on Nero exacerbates the situation, leading to increased brutality against the Christian community. The escalating tension and atrocities compel the commander to rebel against Nero’s regime. Fueled by his love for Ranjana and his sense of justice, the commander transforms into a rebel soldier, determined to protect her and the oppressed Christians.

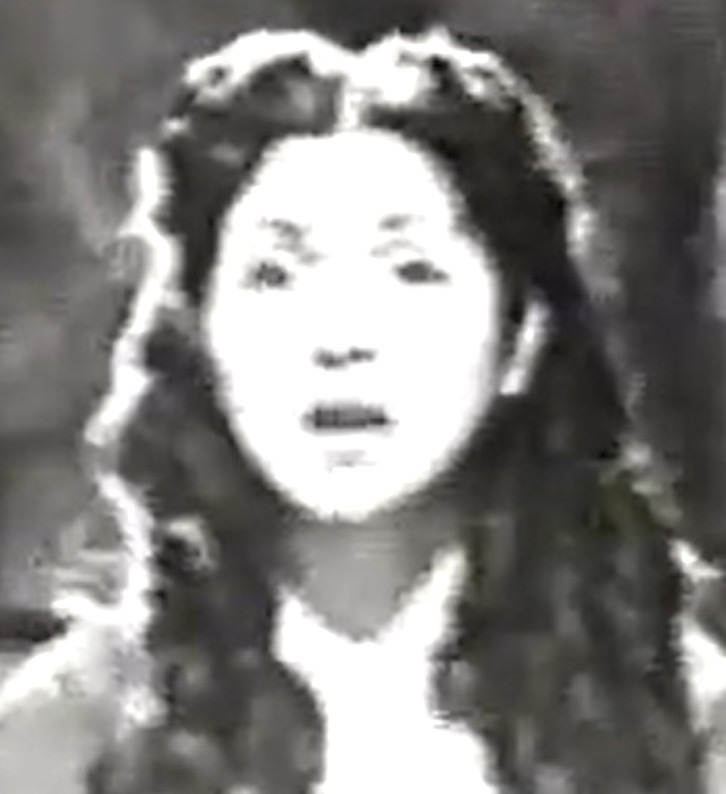
Ranjan in Baghi Sipahi (1958)

The film progresses through a series of horrifying spectacles depicting Nero’s escalating irrationality and cruelty. The commander's rebellion gains momentum, culminating in a climactic struggle that sees him and his allies challenging Nero’s tyranny. In the end, Acte’s intervention proves crucial as she assists Nero with his suicide, leading to the Emperor’s demise and the eventual overthrow of his reign.

In conclusion, Baghi Sipahi offers a unique interpretation of the clash between the Roman Empire and early Christianity, exploring themes of love, sacrifice, and resistance against oppression through the distinctive lens of Indian cinema.

== Cast ==
- Madhubala as Ranjana
- Ranjan as the Emperor
- Chandrashekhar as the military commander
- Purnima as a palace slave
- Nishi as the Emperor's wife
- Om Prakash
- Gope
- Sapru
- Mohana Cabral

== Soundtrack ==
The soundtrack of Baghi Sipahi was composed by Shankar–Jaikishan.

Track #	Song	Singer(s)	Lyricist
1	"Sharab-E-Ishq Ke Aage Muskurati Zindagi Ko Chhod Ke"	Lata Mangeshkar	Shailendra, Hasrat Jaipuri
2	"Sama Ye Pyar Ka Bahar Ke Ye Mele"	Manna Dey, Asha Bhonsle	Shailendra, Hasrat Jaipuri
3	"Chinchan Pappulu Chhui Mui Mai Chhu Na Lena Mujhe"	Manna Dey, Asha Bhonsle	Shailendra, Hasrat Jaipuri
4	"Dil Lagane Wale Mat Sun Meri Kahani"	Lata Mangeshkar	Shailendra, Hasrat Jaipuri
5	"Aye Dilbar Dil Wale Pyar Pe Marne Wale"	Lata Mangeshkar	Shailendra, Hasrat Jaipuri
6	"O Beraham Tere Sitam Hum Pe Honge Kabtak"	Lata Mangeshkar, Manna Day	Shailendra, Hasrat Jaipuri
7	"Ruk Ja Musafir Pal Bhar Hi Ruk Ja"	Lata Mangeshkar	Shailendra, Hasrat Jaipuri
8	"Maan Bhi Le Dil Tu Apni Ye Haar"	Lata Mangeshkar	Shailendra, Hasrat Jaipuri

== Release and reception ==
The film premiered at Novelty Theatre, Bombay, on 20 June 1958.

A review published in Thought disliked the fact that Madhubala was present in almost the whole film, but found her to be "vivacious" in her role. The sets and other actors were only formally praised. However, according to Thought, the lavish war scenes were great in visuals.

Quo Vadis, the 1951 American version of the screen adaptation of Quo Vadis that immediately preceded the release of Baghi Sipahi was a box-office hit. Baghi Sipahi was released seven years after the release of its American counterpart and was not successful at the box office.
