= Pooja (1954 film) =

- Directed by: Bhagwan Das Varma
- Screenplay by: Bhagwan Das Varma
- Story by: C.L. Kavish
- Starring: Bharat Bhushan; Purnima
- Cinematography: Jamshed R. Irani
- Edited by: P. S. Kochikar
- Music by: Shankar–Jaikishan
- Production company: Varma Films
- Distributed by: Varma Films
- Release date: April 20, 1954; (India)
- Running time: 155 minutes
- Country: India
- Language: Hindi

Pooja (Hindi for "Worship") is a 1954 Bollywood film starring Bharat Bhushan and Purnima, produced and distributed by Varma Films. It was directed by Bhagwan Das Varma, one of the founders of Varma Films, who had earlier also directed the film Aurat (1953) for Varma Films. Bharat Bhushan, who was playing the lead role in Pooja, had previously worked as the lead actor in two films distributed by Varma Films: the box-office hit Suhaag Raat (1948) and Thes (1949). Pooja was the first film in which Purnima, who had previously worked in supporting roles for several movies for Varma Films, worked as the leading actress in the film.

Pooja’s notability arose from the filmmakers casting Bharat Bhushan in the key lead role of a singer in the film. Bharat Bhushan’s “mellow looks matched by a soft voice” gave him a non-threatening physical persona with modulated vocal characteristics that strategically aligned with the role he played in Pooja. Remarkably, even before the release of Pooja, Bharat Bhushan had already displayed his talent portraying a singer in two of the period's most acclaimed musicals: the box-office sensation Baiju Bawra (1952) and Shri Chaitanya Mahaprabhu (1953), for which he won the Filmfare Award for Best Actor. It was widely believed that Mohammed Rafi's role as the playback singer for Bharat Bhushan was instrumental in the success of the above two films. Interestingly, Rafi was the playback singer for all the songs sung by Bharat Bhushan in Pooja.

Further contributing to the cinematic significance of Pooja was its subject matter. Bold for its time, Pooja's narrative tackled the controversial issue of remarriage for Indian women, particularly child widows. The film was a passion project for its director Bhagwan Das Varma, and the making of such projects can be challenging as well as require a good deal of creative control, which extant academic research indicates can be achieved when the director also serves as a producer and writer of the film. As one of the founders of Varma Films, Bhagwan Das was able to take on multiple roles for "Pooja," serving as the director, producer, and screenplay writer and thereby exercise the needed creative control for the making of the film.

Pooja has vanished into obscurity, becoming a lost film; nevertheless its musical legacy endures through preserved audio recordings of its songs, a vital component of Indian cinema's box-office success.

== Plot ==
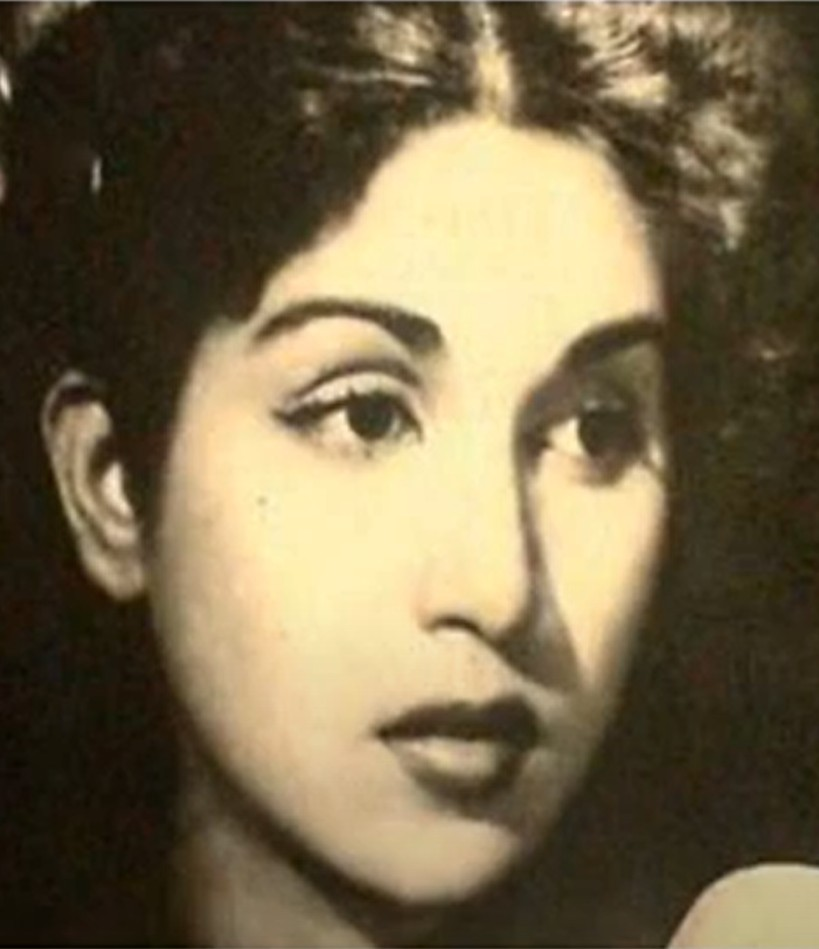
Purnima in Pooja

In a small Indian village, Keshav Das, a respected temple singer, falls ill, leaving a void in the temple's musical tradition. His daughter Kala, a talented singer in her own right, steps in to fill her father's role. Her melodious voice impresses the temple priest, who initially welcomes her contributions. However, upon discovering that Kala is a child widow, the priest abruptly forbids her from singing at the temple, adhering to strict social norms that marginalize widows.

Keshav Das, dismayed by this unjust treatment of his daughter, decides to protest by refusing to sing at the temple himself. This act of solidarity leaves the temple without a singer, creating a dilemma for the religious community. In response, the temple priest and village elders invite Deepak, an outsider, to become the new temple singer.

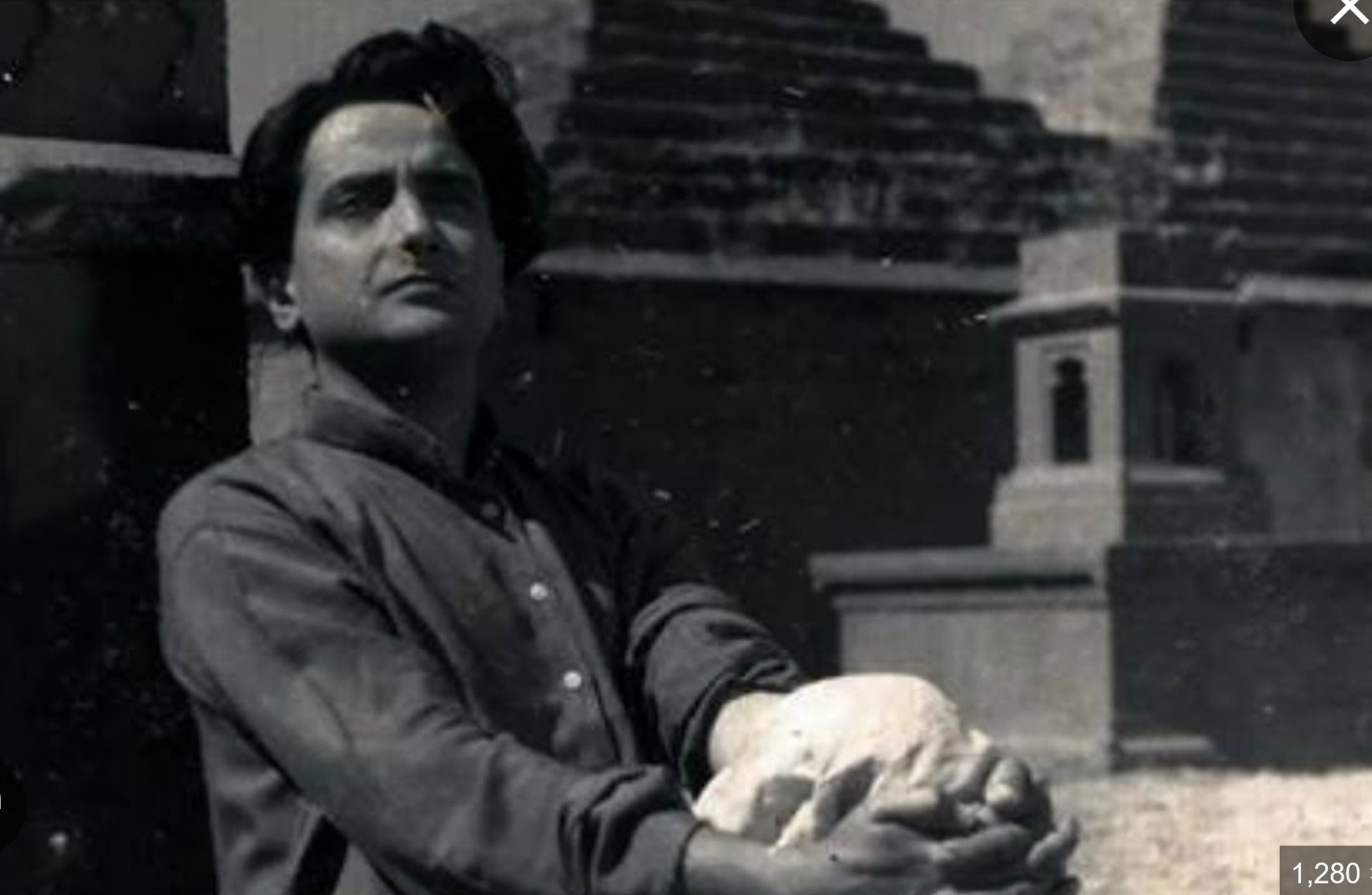
Bharat Bhushan in Pooja

Impressed by Deepak's musical abilities, Keshav Das extends an invitation for the young man to stay with his family and further his musical education. As Deepak spends time in their household, he and Kala develop a close relationship, unaware of the societal barriers that stand between them. Deepak, oblivious to Kala's status as a child widow, begins to fall in love with her.

The story reaches a pivotal moment during the vibrant festival of Holi, a celebration of colors and spring. Deepak, caught up in the festive spirit, innocently applies color to Kala's forehead, a gesture that horrifies the onlooking villagers. This act, though well-intentioned, violates the strict social codes that dictate a widow's behavior and appearance.

Bimmo, ostensibly Kala's friend but harboring her own feelings for Deepak, witnesses this transgression with jealousy and anger. She decides to bring the matter before the Panchayat, the village council of elders. The Mukhiya, who is also Bimmo's father, convenes a meeting to address the situation.

During the Panchayat meeting, the budding love between Deepak and Kala is condemned. The elders, bound by tradition and societal norms, declare that their relationship is forbidden due to Kala's status as a widow. This judgment highlights the deep-rooted prejudices and restrictions faced by widows in Indian society, particularly young widows who are often denied the possibility of remarriage and a fulfilling life.

In the face of this opposition, Ramlal, a wise and compassionate neighbor, suggests a radical solution. He advises Deepak and Kala to leave the village, hoping that they might find acceptance and happiness elsewhere. This advice reflects a recognition of the limitations of their current environment and the possibility of a more tolerant society beyond their village boundaries.

The story concludes with Deepak and Kala confronting the consequences of their forbidden love. Their decision to stay or leave becomes a powerful commentary on the conflict between individual happiness and societal expectations, the challenges faced by widows in traditional Indian society, and the potential for love to transcend social barriers.

== Cast ==
- Bharat Bhushan as Deepak
- Purnima as Kala
- Om Prakash as Head Priest of the temple
- Badri Prasad as Keshav Das
- Shakuntala as Bimmo aka Bimala
- Hiralal as Mukhiya
- Jankidas as Ramlal

== Soundtrack ==
Music was composed by Shankar–Jaikishan, while Hasrat Jaipuri and Shailendra wrote the songs. In addition to well-known singers like Mohammed Rafi and Lata Mangeshkar, one of the songs in the film featured the renowned vocalist and classical musician Krishnarao Phulambrikar.

Song	Singer
"Chal Chal Re Musaafir "	Mohammed Rafi
"Holi Ayi Pyari Bhar Pichakari"	Mohammed Rafi and Lata Mangeshkar
"Mori Bipda Aan Haro Prabhu Kaahe Der Karo"	Lata Mangeshkar
"Main Murlidhar Ki Murali Layi Muralidhar Ne Layi Meri Maala"	Lata Mangeshkar
"Roomjhoom Ke Bajao Bansari Murari"	Mohammed Rafi and Krishnarao Phulambrikar
"Jaha Kahee Dipak Jalata Hai"	Mohammed Rafi
"Jo Ek Baar Keh Do Ki Tum Ho Hamari”	Mohammed Rafi
"Soch Na Manva Teri Taqdir Bananewala Sochega"	Mohammed Rafi
"Bataa De Aye Dil Dil Lagana Na Raas Aaye To Kya Karun"	Lata Mangeshkar

== Release ==
Pooja was released in 1954, the year in which Bhagwan Das married Purnima. It was Purnima's second marriage.

A predominantly moving song in the movie was "Holi Ayi Pyari Bhar Pichakari" where lyricist Shailendra implicitly hopes that Holi can be celebrated by all. In 2013, almost sixty years after the release of “Pooja” in 1954, Shailendra's vision was realized. In an attempt to integrate widows socially into the mainstream, nearly 800 widows were encouraged to celebrate Holi at Vrindavan, a sacred city where Lord Krishna is said to have spent much of his childhood.
