= Thes (film) =

- Directed by: Kidar Sharma
- Produced by: Kidar Sharma; Munshiram Varma
- Starring: Shashikala; Purnima; Bharat Bhushan
- Music by: Snehal Bhatkar
- Production company: Oriental Pictures
- Distributed by: Varma Films
- Release date: August 26, 1949; (India)
- Country: India
- Language: Hindi

Thes (Hindi for "Emotional Setback") is a 1949 Hindi film directed by Kidar Sharma. The main stars of the film were Shashikala, Purnima and Bharat Bhushan.

Produced by Oriental Pictures with distribution rights owned by Varma Films, the two companies collaborated in 1949 with two films (Thes and Neki Aur Badi), after the success of their previous box-office hit, Suhaag Raat, which was the seventh highest-grossing film of 1948.

A distinctive feature of Thes was the ensemble used in the film. Shashikala, the female lead for Thes, would go on to act in over a hundred films in her career spanning around six decades, eventually getting the Padma Shri, one of India's highest civilian awards. Purnima, who would go on to act in a majority of films by Varma Films, was praised by Filmindia, one of the most popular magazines of its time, for her promising role in Thes. Also noteworthy was that the filmmakers of Thes not only used the same director, Kidar Sharma, of their recent hit film Suhaag Raat, but also used other members of Suhaag Raat’s ensemble to create a template for success. Like in Suhaag Raat, the lead male actor of Suhaag Raat, Bharat Bhushan, played the lead role in Thes. Further, the music of Thes was composed by Snehal Bhatkar, the same person who had composed the music of Suhaag Raat. Finally, as with Suhaag Raat, Thes was produced by Kidar Sharma and Munshiram Varma.

Thes, is considered a lost film due to the absence of any known copies of the film. However, almost all of the film’s songs—a cornerstone of Indian cinema's box-office appeal—remain accessible in audio format.

== Plot ==
Haria is a young, carefree man who lives in a small village with his poor blind uncle. Everything seems to be going well for Haria until a Pundit, his young wife, and his smart sister-in-law, Soshila, move into Haria’s neighborhood.

The Pundit’s wife develops a harmonious relationship with Haria and starts calling him Bhai (brother), whereas things just do not seem to warm up between Haria and the Pundit. Although initially Haria and Soshila quarreled a lot, they gradually developed a friendship. The relationship between the two of them was, however, platonic and not romantic. Given how much the Pundit disliked Haria, he was able to stir things up and create a rift in the friendship between Haria and Soshila.

Things really begin to change when Soshila had to move from the village to the city. Haria really missed Soshila, perhaps realizing that there was more to this supposedly platonic relationship between the two of them. To further complicate the issue, Soshila met Shyam in the city, and the two of them fall in love. Not surprisingly, conflicts arise when Soshila returns to the village with Shyam. The film progresses with the aftermath of the emotional setback to Haria from the conflict arising with Soshila's new situation.

== Cast ==
- Shashikala as Soshila
- Purnima as the Pundit's wife
- Bharat Bhushan as Shyam
- Kanwal Mehra as Haria
- Himmat Rai as the Pundit
- Gyani
- Kumar Sahu
- Maruti

== Soundtrack ==
Music was composed by Snehal Bhatkar and Kidar Sharma wrote the lyrics.

#	Title	Singer
1	"Baat To Kuch Bhi Nahin"	Mohammed Rafi and Mukesh
2	"Hum Bhi Aseer-E-Gham Hain Ab Tumse Kya Chhipana "	Rajkumari Dubey
3	"Rovoge Pachhtaaoge (Is Patange Ki Haqeeqat)"	Rajkumari Dubey and Mukesh
4	"Rut Hai Suhani Baadal Chhaaye Re "	Mukesh
5	"Bhagwan Jo Tera Bhi Bhagwan Koi Hota"	Mukesh
6	"Bolo Bolo Sajan Sajan Bolo Bolo"	Rajkumari Dubey and Mukesh
7	"Dhak Dhak Dhadke Dil Mera Haay Rama"	Rajkumari Dubey and Mukesh
8	"Chhup Chhup Ke Teer Chalaye Na Koi"	Rajkumari Dubey and Mukesh
