= Main Nashe Men Hoon =

Main Nashe Mein Hoon
- Poster
- Directed by: Naresh Saigal
- Written by: Jagdish Kanwal
- Screenplay by: Jagdish Kanwal; Shivaji Rathore; Naresh Saigal
- Starring: Raj Kapoor; Mala Sinha; Nishi; Mubarak; Leela Chitnis; Nazir Hussain; Helen
- Cinematography: Krishan Saigal
- Edited by: B.S. Glaad
- Music by: Shankar Jaikishan
- Production company: Varma Pictures
- Distributed by: Varma Pictures
- Release date: 1 January 1959
- Country: India
- Language: Hindi

Main Nashe Men Hoon (English: I Am Intoxicated) is a 1959 Hindi film directed by Naresh Saigal. The film was the second of only two films (the other being Night Club (1958)) distributed and produced by Varma Pictures, an affiliate of Varma Films.

The film’s narrative centers around the downward spiraling effects of alcoholism together with womanizing and the mitigating role that familial structures can have on these effects. In the film’s retelling of this good and evil story, the protagonist in the film, who gets trapped into a sliding descent, is played by lead actor Raj Kapoor, one of the greatest and most influential actors and filmmakers in history of Indian Cinema. The familial structures that attempt to alleviate the falling descent of the protagonist come largely from the person played by lead actress Mala Sinha, who at the time this film was released, was the highest paid actress (along with actress Vyjanthimala).

== Plot ==
Judge Kundan Lal Khanna and his wife Rajni Khanna are part of a well-to-do household proud of their college-going son, Ram Das Khanna. Also, part of the household is Shanta who is being raised by the Khannas after the untimely death of her parents who were friends of Rajni Khanna. Rajni’s hope is that Shanta will someday make a suitable wife for Ram Das.

As one learns early in the film, Kundan Lal’s father, Dharam Das Khanna, was an alcoholic and womanizer and is serving a life sentence after being accused of two murders. Understandably, Kundan Lal develops a strong dislike for alcoholism and womanizing and wants to make sure that his son Ram Das never follows the path of his grandfather.

Unknown to the Khanna family, Dharam Das is released from prison early for good behavior, and is hired by the family as a servant, where Dharam Das explores ways to amend the suffering he has caused the Khanna family.

When a case involving Rita Bakshi and a friend is bought up in a court where Kundan Lal is the judge, Rita’s friend is sentenced to death by Kundan Lal and a heavy financial penalty in imposed on Rita. The plot progresses showing how a bitter Rita gets Ram Das entangled in a web of alcohol and womanizing to seek her revenge on Kundan Lal and extort as much money as she can from him via his son Ram Lal. As much as Judge Kundan Lal had tried to keep his son from falling into the footsteps of his grandfather, he is clearly failing to do so.

Much of the rest of the film progresses with unraveling whether the stability offered by Shanta and the presence of Dharam Das in the Khanna household can undo the actions of a vengeful Rita on Ram Das and the rest of the family.

== Cast ==
The cast of the film is:

Artist	Character Name
Raj Kapoor	Ram Das Khanna
Mala Sinha	Shanta
Nishi	Rita Bakshi
Mubarak	Kundan Lal Khanna
Nazir Hussain	Dharam Das Khanna
Leela Chitnis	Rajni Khanna
Maruti Rao	Shankar
Ramesh Kapoor	Diwan
Dhumal	Munshi Totaram
Keshav Rana	Ram's Friend
Helen	Dancer (song "Gair Ke Gali Mein Piya")

== Music ==
Lyrics were by Shailendra, Hasrat Jaipuri and Mirza Ghalib

Song	Artists	Lyricists	Raga
"Main Nashe Mein Hoon"	Mukesh	Shailendra	
"Lo Khoon Se Khoon Juda Hua"	Mohammed Rafi	Hasrat Jaipuri	
"Hum Hain To Chand Aur Tare"	Mukesh	Hasrat Jaipuri	
"Kisi Nargisi Nazar Ko Dil Denge Hum"	Mukesh	Hasrat Jaipuri	
"Ya Na Thi Hamari Kismat"	Usha Mangeshkar	Mirza Ghalib	
"Maine To Nahi Pee"	Raj Kapoor, Lata Mangeshkar	Shailendra	
"Nazar Nazar Se"	Mukesh, Lata Mangeshkar	Shailendra	
"Saajan Sang Kahe"	Lata Mangeshkar	Hasrat Jaipuri	Tilang
"Gair Ke Gali Mein Piya"	Asha Bhosle	Shailendra	
