= Insaaniyat =

- Directed by: Prayag Raj
- Written by: K. A. Narayan (Story & Screenplay)
- Produced by: Jagdish Varma; Satpal Varma; Sunil Varma (Executive Producer)
- Starring: Shashi Kapoor; Madhu; Sujit Kumar
- Cinematography: N. V. Srinivas
- Edited by: Kamalakar
- Music by: Shankar–Jaikishan
- Production company: J. V. Films
- Distributed by: J. V. Films
- Release date: 1974
- Country: India
- Language: Hindi

Insaaniyat (English: Humanity) is a 1974 Bollywood drama film directed by Prayag Raj. The film stars Shashi Kapoor, Madhu, Sujit Kumar in pivotal roles with Jayant, Jagdeep, Durga Khote, Krishan Dhawan, Roopesh Kumar, Kamal Kapoor in other supporting roles.

Insaaniyat was the first film produced and distributed by J.V. Films; Madhu, the leading actress in the film, made her debut in the film. Insaaniyat was also one of the few Indian movies to prominently feature the Great Bombay Circus, India's oldest circus company.

== Plot ==
Dilip (Shashi Kapoor) and Ram (Sujit Kumar) have been close friends for much of their lives. Whereas Ram is now married to Asha, Dilip lives a care-free life with his wealthy father Karamchand (Mubarak) who is trying to get Dilip married to his friend Poonamchand's (Hari Shivdasani) daughter. Dilip, in the meantime spends much of his time wooing Leena (Madhu) who rebuffs him initially but eventually falls in love with him.

All seems to going well until one day Karamchand falls seriously ill and on his deathbed tells Dilip that he is not his father. After prodding their loyal servant Ramu (Krishan Dhawan), Dilip learns that he was the son of a Judge (Kamal Kapoor) who had sentenced Raghuveer (Jayant), a notorious criminal, to a long prison term. Twenty years ago Raghuveer had escaped from prison and brutally murdered Dilip's father, mother and siblings.

Not surprisingly, Dilip is determined to find Raghuveer and places an ad in the newspapers offering a handsome reward to anybody who can help him locate Raghuveer. Micheal, who works for a circus, responds to this ad, but is murdered by Raghuveer's henchman, Girdharilal, (Roopesh Kumar) before he can inform Dilip that Raghuveer has changed his name to Diwan and is now the owner of the circus. When Dilip learns about this from Micheal's girlfriend, he together with Ram and Leena proceed with a plan on going after Raghuveer.

What is not known to Dilip is that Raghuveer is actually Ram's father who had left Ram and his mother (Durga Khote) twenty years ago. The rest of the film unfolds with the complications that arise when Ram learns that Raghuveer is his father, and how Dilip's plan for taking his revenge on Raghuveer will affect the friendship between Ram and Dilip.

== Cast ==
- Shashi Kapoor as Dilip
- Madhu as Leena
- Sujit Kumar as Ram
- Jayant as Raghuveer / Diwan
- Jagdeep as Abdullah
- Durga Khote as Ram's Mother
- Krishan Dhawan as Ramu
- Roopesh Kumar as Girdharilal
- Kamal Kapoor as Judge
- Pinchoo Kapoor as John
- Viju Khote as Circus Employee
- Surinder Makkar as Micheal
- Jagdish Raj as Inspector Ramesh
- Hari Shivdasani as Poonamchand

== Soundtrack ==
Music of the film was composed by the duo of Shankar–Jaikishan and the songs were penned by lyricists Hasrat Jaipuri and Indeevar.

Song	Singer
"Mere Yaar Ki Yaari Dekhke, Ek Surat Pyari Dekhke"	Mohammed Rafi, Suman Kalyanpur
"Main Tumse Pyar Karta"	Mukesh
"Baat Bhi Kya Humse"	Asha Bhosle

== Production ==
The children of three brothers, Bhagwan Das Varma, Munshiram Varma and Santram Varma (founders of Varma Films that had made box-office hits like Suhaag Raat, Patanga and Badal), pooled their resources in producing Insaaniyat. Jagdish Varma and Satpal Varma, sons of Bhagwan Das Varma, were producers of the film. Sunil Varma, son of Munshiram Varma, was the film's executive producer.

Madhu Makkar (a.k.a. Madhu), née Madhu Varma, daughter of Munshiram Varma, was cast as Leena in one of the three pivotal roles on Insaaniyat opposite veteran actor Shashi Kapoor, who was cast in another pivotal role. The third pivotal role in Insaaniyat was played by Sujit Kumar, who had recently married Kiran Singh, née Kiran Varma, daughter of Santram Varma. Also, Surinder Makkar, spouse of Madhu Makkar, was cast in an important character role in Insaaniyat .

The producers had originally signed up Manmohan Desai, leading director of the 1970s, to direct Insaaniyat . When conflicts arose between the producers and Manmohan midway through the making of the film, he was replaced by Prayag Raj.
