= Parbat (film) =

- Directed by: O. P. Dutta
- Written by: Agha Jani Kashmiri
- Starring: Nutan; Prem Nath; K. N. Singh; Purnima
- Music by: Shankar–Jaikishan
- Production company: Varma Films
- Distributed by: Varma Films
- Release date: February 22, 1952; (India)
- Running time: 112 minutes
- Country: India
- Language: Hindi

Parbat (Hindi for "The Mountain") is a 1952 Bollywood film starring Nutan, Prem Nath, K. N. Singh and Purnima. The film was produced and distributed by Varma Films and directed by O.P. Dutta.

Central to the plot of Parbat is the issue of obsessive love. As recognized by Levitan and Warner, “movies about obsession definitely have an allure—it's that mixture of excitement and terror, similar to the suspense of a quality scary movie.” While movies about obsessive love have always been popular, Parbat’s notability in dealing with this issue arises from the remarkable cast and crew of the film. For example, Nutan, the female lead of the film and the object of obsessive love, held the record of five wins of the Best Actress at Filmfare for over 3 decades. As noted by Dhawan “Through her path-breaking roles, Nutan endeavored to change the mindset of the audience about the place of women in our society. She was a pioneer in the depiction of women, particularly, tortured and tormented women, on the screen.”

K.N. Singh who plays the person in obsessive love, was a noteworthy and scary villain. In his own words, "Even off-screen I was a bad man. One day on my way back from shooting, I had to deliver an envelope at an address given to me by my friend. I pressed the doorbell and, from the moving curtains, I could see a woman hurrying to open the door. When she saw me standing in front of her, she screamed out in fright and ran inside leaving the door open.”

Finally, O.P. Dutta, the movie's director, was the director for as many as 9 movies during his career. In his sample of the careers of 3129 movie directors, De Vany (2003) finds that 1990 out of 3129 (63%) directors made only one movie, and only 23 out of 3129 (less than 1%) directors made 9 movies. With O.P. Dutta’s career including 9 movies as a director, the above comparison benchmark is an indicator of his remarkable directorial ability.

Parbat joins the ranks of lost films, with no surviving copies, but its musical soul persists in the form of audio tracks—an indispensable factor in the box-office success of Indian films. Also, some film stills of Parbat still survive and are available from the external links below and elsewhere.

== Plot ==
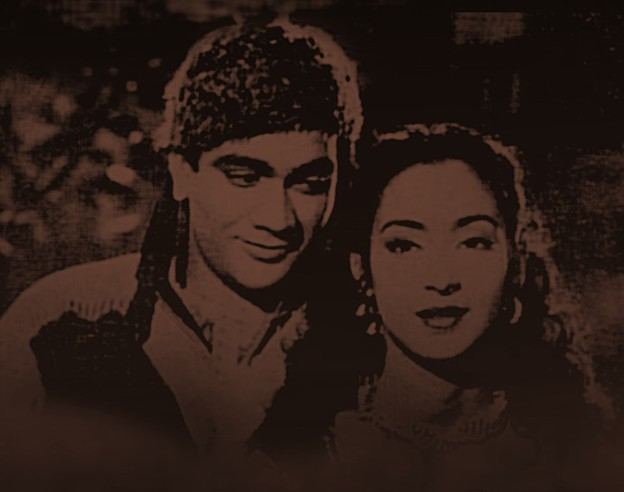
Nutan and Premnath in Parbat

Nestled high in the rugged peaks of a remote mountain range, a picturesque village becomes the backdrop for a poignant tale of love, duty, and sacrifice. The film unfolds against this landscape, where ancient traditions and modern aspirations collide, shaping the destinies of its central characters. At the heart of this narrative is Parbat, a vivacious young woman who is the darling of the village. Her life, seemingly predestined to follow the well-worn paths of her ancestors, takes an unexpected turn when she encounters Pahari, a charming and courageous mountain guide. Pahari, with his rugged good looks and deep understanding of the mountains, captivates Parbat's heart. Their conversations, filled with shared dreams and stolen glances, hint at the promise of a shared future.

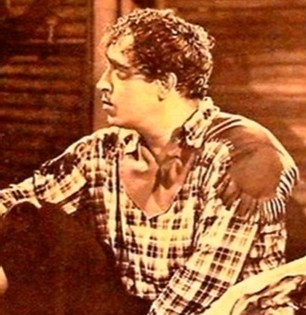
K. N. Singh in Parbat

However, the idyllic romance is abruptly threatened by the return of Singh, a wealthy, older man whose obsession with Parbat casts a long, ominous shadow over the village. Singh's history with Parbat is fraught with unwanted advances and thinly veiled threats, setting the stage for a conflict that will test the strength of her newfound love. His return brings with it a palpable tension, as the villagers, aware of his influence and power, tread carefully around him. Singh, emboldened by his wealth and status, wastes no time in employing his considerable influence to drive a wedge between Parbat and Pahari. He manipulates local authorities, threatens Pahari's livelihood, and even attempts to buy the loyalty of Parbat's family. These machinations create obstacles that seem insurmountable, forcing Parbat and Pahari to question the viability of their relationship in the face of such formidable opposition.

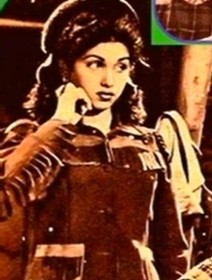
Purnima in Parbat

The conflict intensifies as Pahari's family, fearing Singh's power and influence, succumbs to pressure and arranges a marriage between Pahari and Naina, a sweet and gentle woman from their village. This arrangement plunges Pahari into a deep moral quandary, torn between his passionate love for Parbat and his sense of duty to his family and traditions. Parbat, upon learning of the arranged marriage, is left heartbroken. She attempts to move on, throwing herself into her work and community responsibilities, but her lingering feelings for Pahari remain a constant undercurrent in her life. The film skillfully portrays her internal conflict, showcasing moments of quiet despair juxtaposed with her determination to find happiness despite her circumstances. Naina, the third point in this emotional triangle, is not oblivious to the situation she finds herself in. Aware of Pahari's true affections, she struggles with her own feelings of inadequacy and sadness. Her character evolves throughout the narrative, from a passive participant in an arranged marriage to a woman grappling with complex emotions and her own desires for genuine love and companionship.

The resolution of the story offers a nuanced exploration of love's many forms and the difficult choices we sometimes must make in its name. As the final scenes unfold, the audience is left to explore the enduring power of love to transform lives, even in the face of seemingly insurmountable odds.

== Cast ==
- Prem Nath as Pahari
- Nutan as Parbat
- K.N. Singh
- Purnima as Naina
- Ulhas
- Raj Mehra
- Shobhna Samarth

== Soundtrack ==
Music was composed by Shankar–Jaikishan, while Hasrat Jaipuri and Shailendra wrote the lyrics.

#	Title	Singer	Lyricist
1	"Kya Bataaon Muhobbat"	Mohammed Rafi, Geeta Dutt and Lata Mangeshkar	Shailendra
2	"Meethi Meethi Baaton Se Bholi Bhaali Ghaaton Se"	Lata Mangeshkar	Shailendra
3	"Sunaye Kisko Afsaana, Kisi Par Dil Hai Dewaana, Shama Pe Jaise Parwana"	Lata Mangeshkar	Hasrat Jaipuri
4	"Haye Mera Dil Le Gaya Koi Aake Ishaaron Se"	Lata Mangeshkar	Hasrat Jaipuri
5	"Pyaar Bharee Inn Aankhon Ne"	Lata Mangeshkar and Geeta Dutt	Hasrat Jaipuri
6	"Hothon Pe Tarane Aa Gaye Ji Hum To Dil Ki Tamanna Pa Gaye"	Talat Mahmood and Lata Mangeshkar	Hasrat Jaipuri
7	"Beraham Maar Dale Na Mujhko Tera Gham Ab To Aa Ja"	Lata Mangeshkar	Shailendra
