= Ladla =

- Directed by: Surya Kumar
- Screenplay by: Balkrishna Mauj
- Starring: Karan Dewan; Shyama; Agha
- Cinematography: K.V.S. Reddy
- Edited by: Manohar Prabhu
- Music by: Vinod
- Production company: Varma Films
- Distributed by: Varma Films
- Release date: November 22, 1954; (India)
- Running time: 140 minutes
- Country: India
- Language: Hindi

Ladla (Hindi for "Beloved Son") is a 1954 Bollywood film that was produced and distributed by Varma Films. It was directed by Surya Kumar and written by Balkrishna Mauj.

Ladla’s plot revolved around a love triangle involving two men, Prakash and Motilal, who fall in love with the same woman, Neelu. The film showcased notable actors of the time, including Karan Dewan, Shyama and Agha. Adding to Ladla’s cinematic significance were the film's songs, featuring the voices of prominent playback singers such as Asha Bhosle, Talat Mahmood, Mohammed Rafi, and Shamshad Begum. Most importantly, in light of the widespread belief that songs are vital to the commercial success of Indian films, Ladla derives its cinematic importance from the fact that its songs were composed by the famous Hindi film music director Vinod. Vinod's work on Ladla is considered among his best-known creations, contributing to the film's appeal during the Golden Age of Hindi Cinema, where filmmakers sought to create an enhanced cinematic experience by combining compelling storytelling with memorable songs.

Despite its status as a lost film with no extant copies, the movie's songs—key to an Indian film's popularity—can still be heard today.

== Plot ==
Prakash, the protagonist of the film, is the son of a wealthy man and the favored child of his family. Seeking independence, he abandons his luxurious lifestyle and relocates with his friend Johnny to Bombay, where he secures employment and embarks on a new life.

In Bombay, Prakash meets Neelu and the two of them fall in love. Surprisingly, a love triangle does not emerge between Prakash, Neelu and Johnny. Instead, Johnny befriends Sheelu and they too fall in love. All seems to be going well for all four of them, until Motilal enters the picture. Like Prakash, Motilal is also madly in love with Neelu.

Things become even more complicated when Prakash visits Motilal at his home where, after looking at several photographs, Prakash realises that Motilal is his long-lost brother.

The plot in Ladla progresses with the resolution of the conflict that arises in a love triangle when two brothers are in love with the same woman.

== Cast ==
The roles played by the three participants in the love triangle as well as others are shown below:

- Karan Dewan as Prakash
- Shyama as Neelu
- Agha as Johnny
- Krishnakumari as Sheelu
- S. Nazeer as Motilal
- Jeevan
- Raj Mehra
- Dev Kishan

== Soundtrack ==
Music was composed by Vinod, while Kaif Ifrani, Balkrishna Mauj, and Raja Mehdi Ali Khan wrote the lyrics.

Song	Singer
"Ae Topiwale Maflarwale"	G. M. Durrani
"Jal Tu Jalal Tu, Aayi Bala Ko Taal Tu"	G. M. Durrani, Trilok Kapoor
"Tu Jo Likhe Kismat Aisi"	Mohammed Rafi
"Aji Darwaja To Kholo, Aji Kuch Munh Se To Bolo"	Mohammed Rafi, Shamshad Begum
"Bura Hua Jo Inse Hamare Naina Lad Gaye Ji, Banke Musibat Yeh To Hamare Peechhe Pad Gaye Ji"	Mohammed Rafi, Talat Mahmood, Asha Bhosle
"Pyar Nahin Chhupta Chhupane Se"	Talat Mahmood, Asha Bhosle
"Zindagi Do Din Ki Hai"	Asha Bhosle
"Hay Hay Re Zamana"	Asha Bhosle
