= Sagai (film) =

1951 film

- Directed by: H. S. Rawail
- Screenplay by: Anjana Rawail
- Story by: Anjana Rawail
- Starring: Premnath; Rehana
- Cinematography: Jamshed R. Irani
- Edited by: Prabhakar Gokhale
- Music by: C. Ramchandra
- Production company: Varma Films
- Distributed by: Varma Films
- Release date: 1951
- Country: India
- Language: Hindi

Sagai (English: Engagement) is a 1951 Bollywood drama film starring Premnath and Rehana directed by H. S. Rawail. It was the second time H. S. Rawail collaborated with Varma Films after the success of their previous film Patanga, which was the seventh highest-grossing film of 1949. As in Patanga, Rajendra Kumar, who would rise to become one of the leading actors in Indian cinema, worked on Sagai as an assistant to director H. S. Rawail.

Sagai was distinguished by the use of its filmmakers not only to use the same director of their recent hit film Patanga, but also to use several other members of Patanga’s ensemble hopefully to create a blueprint for success. Like in Patanga, H.S. Rawail’s wife, Anjana Rawail, was the storywriter of Sagai.

Also, several cast members of Patanga, such as Purnima, Gope and Yakub played important roles in Sagai. Finally, and perhaps most importantly, the music of Sagai was composed by C. Ramchandra, who also had composed the hit music of Patanga.

== Plot ==
Sagai revolves around the depiction of a love triangle. In such triangles two people typically compete for the exclusive romantic attention of a single person, such as two women competing for the sole love interest of a particular man. Whereas Sagai is not about love triangles per se, the film demonstrates how a love triangle is deployed as a storytelling device in a Bollywood film.

In Sagai the complexity of the triangular love relationship begins with Chandni. When she returns home from London, her father feels that she has come of age and informs her of her engagement (her sagai) to a groom he had selected for her when she was a child. When he asks her to marry him, Chandni declines to do so, runs away from home and ends up joining Fooman and Dhaboo on a successions of explorations. One such exploration lands them aboard a ship captained by Prem, who is transporting Princess Shehzadi to her native land, Jagira.

Over the course of their journey to Jagira, both Chandni and Shehzadi fall in love with the handsome and charming Captain Prem, and so begins the conflict that arises in a classic love triangle when two women fall in love with the same man. What further complicates this love triangle is that when the ship reaches Jagira, Shehzadi’s brother, the King, insists that Prem marry Shehzadi and imprisons him when Prem refuses to do so. The King then proposes to Chandni who is already engaged to the man her father had selected for her years ago. The film progresses with the resolution of the conflicts that arise in this complex love triangle.

== Cast ==
- Premnath as Captain Prem
- Rehana as Chandni
- Purnima as Shehzadi
- Yakub as Dhaboo
- Gope as Fooman
- Sunder as Prem’s Assistant
- Iftekhar as Chandni’s Father
- Hiralal as the King
- Mohana Cabral as Laundry lady

== Soundtrack ==
Music was composed by C. Ramchandra, while Rajinder Krishan wrote the lyrics.

Song	Singer
"Dil Ki Kahani"	Lata Mangeshkar
"Daddy Ji, O Daddy Ji"	Lata Mangeshkar
"Aankhon Se Jo Bhi Aansoo"	Lata Mangeshkar
"O Babu, O Babu, Kaise Dil Karun Kabu, Samjhaye Ja"	Lata Mangeshkar, Amirbai Karnataki
"Mohabbat Mein Aise Zamane Bhi Aaye"	Lata Mangeshkar, Talat Mahmood
"Mohabbat Ho Gayi Bas Ek Nazar Se, Bas Ek Nazar Se"	Lata Mangeshkar, Mohammed Rafi
"Jhukti Hai Duniya, Jhukanewala Chahiye, Jhukanewala Chahiye"	Lata Mangeshkar, C. Ramchandra, Mohammed Rafi
Bigad Gayi Bante Bante Baat, Hui Woh Jooton Ki Barsaat, Tabiyat Saaf Ho Gayi Saaf, Eik Din Lahore Ki Thandi Sarak Per	C. Ramchandra, Mohammed Rafi, Shamshad Begum
"Mohabbat Jatake, Aankhen Ladake, Chale Aa Rahe Hain"	C. Ramchandra, Mohammed Rafi
