= Neki Aur Badi =

1949 film by Kidar Sharma

- Directed by: Kidar Sharma
- Produced by: Kidar Sharma; Munshiram Varma
- Starring: Madhubala; Geeta Bali; Kidar Sharma
- Cinematography: Jamshed Irani
- Edited by: Prabhakar Gokhale
- Music by: Roshan
- Production company: Oriental Pictures
- Distributed by: Varma Films
- Release date: May 27, 1949; (India)
- Country: India
- Language: Hindi

Neki Aur Badi (Hindi for "Goodness Grows") is a 1949 Indian Hindi-language patriotic drama film directed by Kidar Sharma. The film stars Sharma with Madhubala and Geeta Bali. It was the only film in which Sharma played the male lead role.

Produced by Oriental Pictures with distribution rights owned by Varma Films, the two companies collaborated in 1949 with two films (Thes and Neki aur Badi) after the success of their previous box-office hit, Suhaag Raat, which was the seventh highest-grossing film of 1948. To create a template for success, the filmmakers not only used the same director, Kidar Sharma, of Suhaag Raat in Neki aur Badi but also used another important member of Suhaag Raat's ensemble in Neki aur Badi. Filmindia in its review of Suhaag Raat, referred to the film as "Geeta Bali's Sohag Raat", giving Geeta Bali much credit for its box-office success; Geeta Bali was cast in an important supporting role in Neki aur Badi by its filmmakers.

Another particularly standout feature of Neki aur Badi that elevated the film was its lead actress Madhubala, who in the early 1950s had been called "the biggest star in the world" by David Cort of Theatre Arts Magazine.

As a lost film, no known copies of Neki Aur Badi remain; nevertheless, the audio tracks of most of its songs have survived.

== Plot ==
On a stormy night, a wealthy man drives his wife and their new-born daughter, Soshila, out of the house because he had hoped his wife would deliver a son. Years later, what happened is revealed to Soshila, now a young woman, by an old servant, Gopi, who also informs her that the father now lives with his wicked new wife and her daughter Baby.

In hopes to win back her father’s affections, Soshila decides to run away to Bombay, where her father lives. Stranded, alone and almost without money, one day she meets Nandan, who extends a helping hand to her. Over time Soshila and Nandan fall in love and decide that they will attempt to reverse the situation with Soshila’s father. Both Nandan and Soshila get jobs in Soshila’s father’s home where they get to know his wife and daughter, Baby.

As the days go by, Baby gets attracted to Nandan and starts making advances toward him—much to Soshila’s chagrin. Nadan manages to convince Soshila’s father one day that both Baby and her mother have been bitten by a mad dog and should both be hospitalized. The father agrees, and the rest of the movie follows Soshila’s efforts to get her father to accept her back into their home.

== Cast ==
The main cast of the film include:

- Madhubala as Soshila
- Geeta Bali as Baby
- Kidar Sharma as Nandan
- Uma Dutt as Gopi
- Pesi Patel as Soshila's father
- Krishna as Soshila’s mother
- Nazira as Baby’s mother

== Production ==
In 1946, Sharma had given Madhubala her first break in Neel Kamal and thought of her as his "discovery"; he thus expected her not to work with other directors for at least the time he would establish her. However, Madhubala's father, known for his stubbornness, signed newer films as they came, informing neither Madhubala nor Sharma. Therefore, the production of Neki Aur Badi was an attempt by Sharma to retain the actress with him. As indicated earlier, other Sharma “discoveries” in the film included Geeta Bali, in a supporting role, and Roshan, as the music composer of the film.

== Soundtrack ==
Music was composed by Roshan, while Kidar Sharma wrote the lyrics. Roshan made his debut as a music director with this film.

Song	Singer
"Chand Hansa"	Amirbai Karnataki
"Chhail Chhabili"	Amirbai Karnataki
"Hamen Na Roko"	Amirbai Karnataki
"Kyo Ji Scent Lagaya"	Amirbai Karnataki, Firoz Dastur
"Jamuna Tat Par"	Rajkumari, Firoz Dastur,
"Dilwalon"	Rajkumari
"Hamen Bhane Lage"	Rajkumari
"Ram Duhayi"	Rajkumari, Asha Bhosle

== Reception ==
Neki Aur Badi was commercially unsuccessful and received poor notices from critics. Madhubala's biographer Mohan Deep has said that the film's disastrous results "show how foolish Kidar Sharma could be."
