= David Cort =

American journalist

- Born: July 5, 1904
- Died: October 11, 1983 (aged 79)
- Education: Columbia University
- Occupations: writer (journalist, columnist, editor, prose writer)
- Writing career
- Language: English
- Notable awards: Guggenheim Fellowship (1971)

David Cort (July 5, 1904 – October 11, 1983) was a 20th-century American writer (journalist, columnist, editor, and prose writer), best known as foreign news editor at Life magazine.

== Background ==
In 1924, Cort graduated from Columbia University, where he had been editor of The Jester and a member of the Philolexian Society.

== Career ==
By the late 1920s, Cort had become a contributor to Vanity Fair magazine.

In 1932, he joined Time magazine as assistant foreign news editor.

In 1936, he moved to Life as foreign news editor. He is best known for his work there in selecting and captioning photographs shot during World War II.

He also contributed to The Nation magazine and The New York Times Book Review.

== Personal and death ==
Cort had one son.

He died age 79 on October 11, 1983, in New York City.

== Awards ==
- 1971: Guggenheim Fellow (General Nonfiction)

== Works ==
Books:

- The Big Picture
- Social Astonishments
- The Glossy Rats
- Revolution by Cliche
- The Sin of Henry R. Luce (New York: L. Stuart, 1974)

Articles:

- "Of Guilt and Resurrection," The Nation (March 20, 1967) on the Hiss-Chambers case

== External sources ==
- Harper's: David Cort
- The Nation: David Cort
