= Snehal Bhatkar =

Indian music director (1919-2007)

Snehal Bhatkar (real name Vasudev Gangaram Bhatkar; 17 July 1919–29 May 2007), was a well known Hindi and Marathi film music composer from Mumbai, India.

== Awards and recognition ==
He is the recipient of Lata Mangeshkar Award instituted by Government of Maharashtra of year 2004.

== Early life ==
Snehal Bhatkar was born on 17 July 1919 in Mumbai in a Marathi-speaking family. His father died when he was 18 months old. His mother was a teacher and was a singer as well. So she became his inspiration to pursue music. It was from her that he picked up the basics of music. After completing matriculation or 10th grade in school, he learned music at a music school in Dadar, Mumbai.

== Pseudonym ==
To avoid any breach in contract while officially working for His Master's Voice, he adopted various pseudonyms as a composer. These included "B. Vasudev" and "Snehal" but another choice, "Snehal Bhatkar", became his professional name after 1950. The name was derived from that of his then newly born daughter, Snehlata.

== Career ==
Snehal Bhatkar was first employed by His Master's Voice (HMV) record company in the 1940s, when the company was releasing many non-film Marathi language records.

He started his Hindi language movie career with the movie Neel Kamal (1947 film) in the year 1947. Bhatkar and lyricist Kidar Nath Sharma had shared a special bond, teaming up for hit songs like Kabhi Tanhaiyon Mein Yuun Hamari Yaad Aayegi (Hamari Yaad Aayegi) (1961 film) which may be regarded as the zenith of Bhatkar's career.

== Personal life ==
His three children include noted Marathi actor Ramesh Bhatkar, Avinash Bhatkar and daughter Snehlata Bhatkar (now married to Ramkrishna Barde).

== Death ==
Snehal Bhatkar died on 29 May 2007 at the age of 87 years at his Mumbai residence.

== Music Director ==
- Pehla Kadam (1980)
- Fariyad (1964)
- Deepak (1963)
- Hamari Yaad Aayegi (1961)
- Chhabili (1960)
- Scout Camp (1959)
- Haria (1958)
- Diwali Ki Raat (1956)
- Jaldeep (1956)
- Aaj Ki Baat (1955)
- Bindiyan (1955)
- Daku (1955)
- Gunah (1953)
- Bhola Shankar (1951)
- Nand Kishore (1951)
- Hamari Beti (1950)
- Thes (1949)
- Sohag Raat (1948)
- Neel Kamal (1947)
