= Sohag Raat (1948 film) =

Suhaag Raat
- Directed by: Kidar Sharma
- Written by: F. A. Mirza; V. Sharma
- Screenplay by: Kidar Sharma
- Story by: Kidar Sharma
- Produced by: Munshiram Varma; Kidar Sharma
- Starring: Bharat Bhushan; Begum Para; Geeta Bali
- Cinematography: D. K. Ambre; D. C. Mehta; Mr. Machave
- Edited by: S. S. Chawande
- Music by: Snehal Bhatkar
- Production company: Oriental Pictures
- Distributed by: Varma Films
- Release date: 1948
- Country: India
- Language: Hindi

Sohag Raat (Hindi for "Wedding Night) is a 1948 Hindi film of Indian cinema directed by Kidar Sharma. A romantic drama, it was the third film produced by Oriental Pictures and the first film to be distributed by the newly-founded company Varma Films. The story was a joint effort by F. A. Mirza and V. Sharma, while the screenplay, dialogue and lyrics were written by Kidar Sharma. The music was composed by Snehal Bhatkar, with cinematography by D. K. Ambre and D. C. Mehta. Geeta Bali made her debut in a lead feature film role with this movie, which co-starred Bharat Bhushan and Begum Para. The rest of the cast included Pesi Patel, Nazir Kashmiri, S. Nazir, Nazira and Shanta Kumar.

The story was set in a village in Kullu, Himachal Pradesh. Though Kullu was used as a backdrop, most of the shooting actually took place in Bombay. The costumes worn by the film's characters were representative of the hilly people of Himachal Pradesh and justified the setting. The outdoor photography by D. K. Ambre and D. C. Mehta was praised for its "picturesque" composition. The story was a romantic triangle, with two girls, one rich and the other poor, falling in love with the same man. Geeta Bali as Kammo, the poor village girl, and Begum Para as Paro, the rich landlord's daughter, portray the two girls. Bharat Bhushan as Beli, who has been saved by Kammo's father, Jaggu (Pesi Patel), plays the love interest. The arrival of the villain Rahu, Beli's step-brother, and its consequences form the rest of the story.

Sohag Raat was released at Excelsior and Lamington Cinemas, in Bombay on 25 June 1948, and was the seventh highest-grossing Indian film of 1948. The film's success was attributed to the "refreshing" debutante Geeta Bali, with Baburao Patel titling his review of the film in the August 1948 issue of Filmindia, as "Geeta Bali's Sohag Raat".

== Plot ==
A dying mother asks her step-son, Rahu, to look after his younger stepbrother, Beli (Bharat Bhushan). The stepson decides to have Beli murdered in order to lay claim to the entire property. Rahu appoints Jaggu (Pesi Patel) to carry out the killing. However, Jaggu changes his mind when Beli asks him if he has any children. Jaggu then takes Beli to his village in Kullu, where he lives with his cheerful and spirited daughter Kammo (Geeta Bali). Beli soon finds a job at the Zamindar's (Landlord) house. The landlord's daughter, Paro (Begum Para), is a good friend of Kammo. Both Kammo and Paro fall in love with Beli, but Beli likes Paro.

Rahu finds out that Beli is not dead and comes to the village, ingratiating himself with the Zamindar. He asks for Paro's hand in marriage and the Zamindar agrees. On the wedding night, Kammo persuades Beli and Paro to elope but they are stopped by Rahu who tries to shoot Beli. Kammo comes in the way and is shot. She dies uniting the two lovers.

== Cast ==
- Bharat Bhushan as Beli
- Begum Para as Paro
- Geeta Bali as Kammo
- Pesi Patel as Jaggu
- Maruti
- Nazir Kashmiri

== Geeta Bali ==
Geeta Bali started her cinematic career with R. K. Shorey's short film called The Cobbler (1942) at the age of twelve, following which she made her maiden feature film appearance in actor-director Majnu's Badnami (1946). Author Tilak Rishi writes that Sharma cast Bali after being attracted by her lively dance performances and "offscreen vivacity". According to Sharma, in his autobiography "The One and Lonely Kidar Sharma", he was impressed by Geeta Bali's "nymph like naughtiness", and was convinced to cast her as the main heroine.

Patel's quote on Bali's debut, and about her being introduced as "a New Talent" in the film's booklet were:

"she definitely HAS talent which even overcomes plain features and a pug nose. More than even talent in this picture she reveals a personality in which naivette (sic), charm and a boyish vivacity are all mixed. That all these qualities were latent in her is true; Kidar Sharma could not have invented them. But it is equally true that by giving her a role that fitted her personality and then providing her appropriate situations, the director-writer has brought out that personality. Those who saw her in extra roles in some obscure Lahore-made pictures are truly and agreeably surprised. It may truly be said that Kidar Sharma has not only discovered but made a star".

== Review and reception ==
The film was to mark a turning point for its heroine, Geeta Bali. The audience related to Geeta Bali's lively performance and as stated by Rishi, she was "inundated with film offers". Filmindia in its review Title, referred to the film as "Geeta Bali's Sohag Raat", giving the debutant, Geeta Bali, full credit for its box-office success. According to author Ashok Raj, "Kidar Sharma reached the zenith of his intense creative work with Suhaag Raat".

== Music ==
The music director was Snehal Bhatkar, who composed songs like "Rhoom Jhoom Matware Badal Chha Gaye", "Chhod Chale Munh Mod Chale", "Javo Javo Na Satao" and "Mere Dil Ki Dhadkanon Mein" all written by Kidar Sharma. "Lakhi Babul Mere Kaahe Ko Dinhi Bides" (Father, Why Do You Send Me To a Foreign Land), the bidai (bride send-off, bidding farewell to the bride) song "attributed to Amir Khusro" was sung by Mukesh. The song, which is lip-synced by Jaggu (Pesi Patel) appeared twice in the film, the second version being the sad one when Kammo dies.

Songlist:

#	Title	Singer
1	"Rhoom Jhoom Matwaale Badal Chha Gaye"	Geeta Roy, Rajkumari
2	"Baaje Mori Paayal Thunak Thunak"	Geeta Roy, Rajkumari
3	"Kis Paapi Sang Uljhi Ankhiyaan"	Geeta Roy, Rajkumari
4	"Lakhi Babul More Kaahe Ko Deenhi Bides"	Mukesh
5	"Mere Dil Ki Dhadkanon Mein Sakhi"	Geeta Roy, Shamshad Begum
6	"Tere Bin Meri Zindagani Kis Kaam Ki"	Shamshad Begum
7	"Javo Javo Na Satao"	Rajkumari
8	"Ye Bura Kiya Jo Saaf Saaf Kah Diya"	Rajkumari, Mukesh
9	"Chhod Chale Munh Mod Chale"	Rajkumari
