= Manoj Kumar filmography =

Manoj Kumar (24 July 1937 – 4 April 2025) was an Indian actor, film director, screenwriter, lyricist and editor who worked in Hindi cinema. In a career spanning over four decades, he worked in 54 films. He is regarded as one of the most successful actors in the history of Indian cinema.

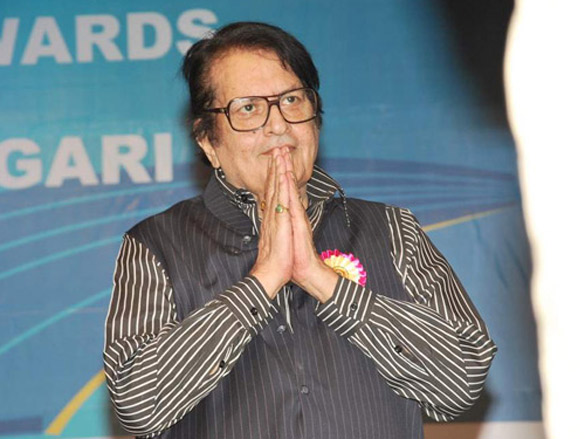
Kumar in 2010

== Filmography ==
Year	Film	Actor	Director	Producer	Editor	Role	Notes	Ref.
1957	Fashion	Yes	No	No	No	N/A		
1958	Sahara	Yes	No	No	No	Shyam		
1958	Panchayat	Yes	No	No	No	Gopal		
1959	Chand	Yes	No	No	No	Gokul		
1960	Honeymoon	Yes	No	No	No	Kishore		
1961	Kanch Ki Gudiya	Yes	No	No	No	Raju		
1961	Piya Milan Ki Aas	Yes	No	No	No	Maji		
1961	Suhag Sindoor	Yes	No	No	No	Ratan		
1961	Reshmi Rumal	Yes	No	No	No	Shyam		
1962	Hariyali Aur Rasta	Yes	No	No	No	Shankar		
1962	Maa Beta	Yes	No	No	No	Keshav		
1962	Banarsi Thug	Yes	No	No	No	Shyam		
1962	Shaadi	Yes	No	No	No	Raja		
1962	Apna Banake Dekho	Yes	No	No	No	N/A		
1962	Dr. Vidya	Yes	No	No	No	Ratan Chowdhury		
1962	Naqli Nawab	Yes	No	No	No	Yusuf		
1963	Grahasti	Yes	No	No	No	Mohan		
1963	Ghar Basake Dekho	Yes	No	No	No	Kumar		
1964	Apne Huye Paraye	Yes	No	No	No	Dr. Shankar		
1964	Woh Kaun Thi?	Yes	No	No	No	Dr. Anand		
1964	Phoolon Ki Sej	Yes	No	No	No	Nirmal Verma		
1965	Shaheed	Yes	No	No	No	Bhagat Singh		
1965	Bedaag	Yes	No	No	No	Rajesh		
1965	Himalay Ki God Mein	Yes	No	No	No	Dr. Sunil Mehra		
1965	Gumnaam	Yes	No	No	No	C.I.D. Inspector Anand		
1965	Poonam Ki Raat	Yes	No	No	No	Prakash Gupta		
1966	Do Badan	Yes	No	No	No	Vikas		
1966	Sawan Ki Ghata	Yes	No	No	No	Gopal		
1967	Anita	Yes	No	No	No	Neeraj		
1967	Picnic	Yes	No	No	No	Vinod		
1967	Upkar	Yes	Yes	Yes	No	Bharat		
1967	Patthar Ke Sanam	Yes	No	No	No	Rajesh		
1968	Neel Kamal	Yes	No	No	No	Ram		
1968	Aadmi	Yes	No	No	No	Dr. Shekhar		
1969	Sajan	Yes	No	No	No	Ashok Saxena / Vinod		
1970	Purab Aur Paschim	Yes	Yes	Yes	No	Bharat		
1970	Yaadgaar	Yes	No	No	No	Bhanu		
1970	Pehchan	Yes	No	No	No	Gangaram "Ganga"		
1970	Mera Naam Joker	Yes	No	No	No	David Francis		
1971	Balidaan	Yes	No	No	No	Raja		
1972	Shor	Yes	Yes	Yes	Yes	Shankar		
1972	Be-Imaan	Yes	No	No	No	Mohan		
1974	Roti Kapda Aur Makaan	Yes	Yes	Yes	Yes	Bharat		
1975	Sanyasi	Yes	No	No	No	Ram Rai		
1976	Dus Numbri	Yes	No	No	No	Arjun		
1977	Amaanat	Yes	No	No	No	Deepak		
1977	Shirdi Ke Sai Baba	Yes	No	No	No	Scientist	Also screenwriter and lyricist	
1979	Jat Punjabi	Yes	No	No	No	Jat Punjabi	Punjabi film	
1981	Kranti	Yes	Yes	Yes	Yes	Bharat		
1983	Mujhe Insaaf Chahiye	Yes	No	No	No	Himself	Guest appearance	
1983	Film Hi Film	Yes	No	No	No	Himself	Guest appearance	
1983	Painter Babu	No	No	Yes	No	—		
1987	Kalyug Aur Ramayan	Yes	No	Yes	Yes	Pawan Putra Shri Hanuman		
1989	Santosh	Yes	No	No	No	Santosh Singh		
1989	Clerk	Yes	Yes	Yes	Yes	Bharat		
1991	Deshwasi	Yes	No	No	No	Sangram Singh		
1995	Maidan-E-Jung	Yes	No	No	No	Master Dinanath		
1999	Jai Hind	No	Yes	Yes	No	—		
