= List of awards and nominations received by Manoj Kumar =

Manoj Kumar (24 July 1937 – 4 April 2025) was an Indian actor, film director, screenwriter, lyricist and editor who worked in Hindi cinema. In a career spanning over four decades, he worked in 55 films. He is regarded as one of the most successful actors in the history of Indian cinema.

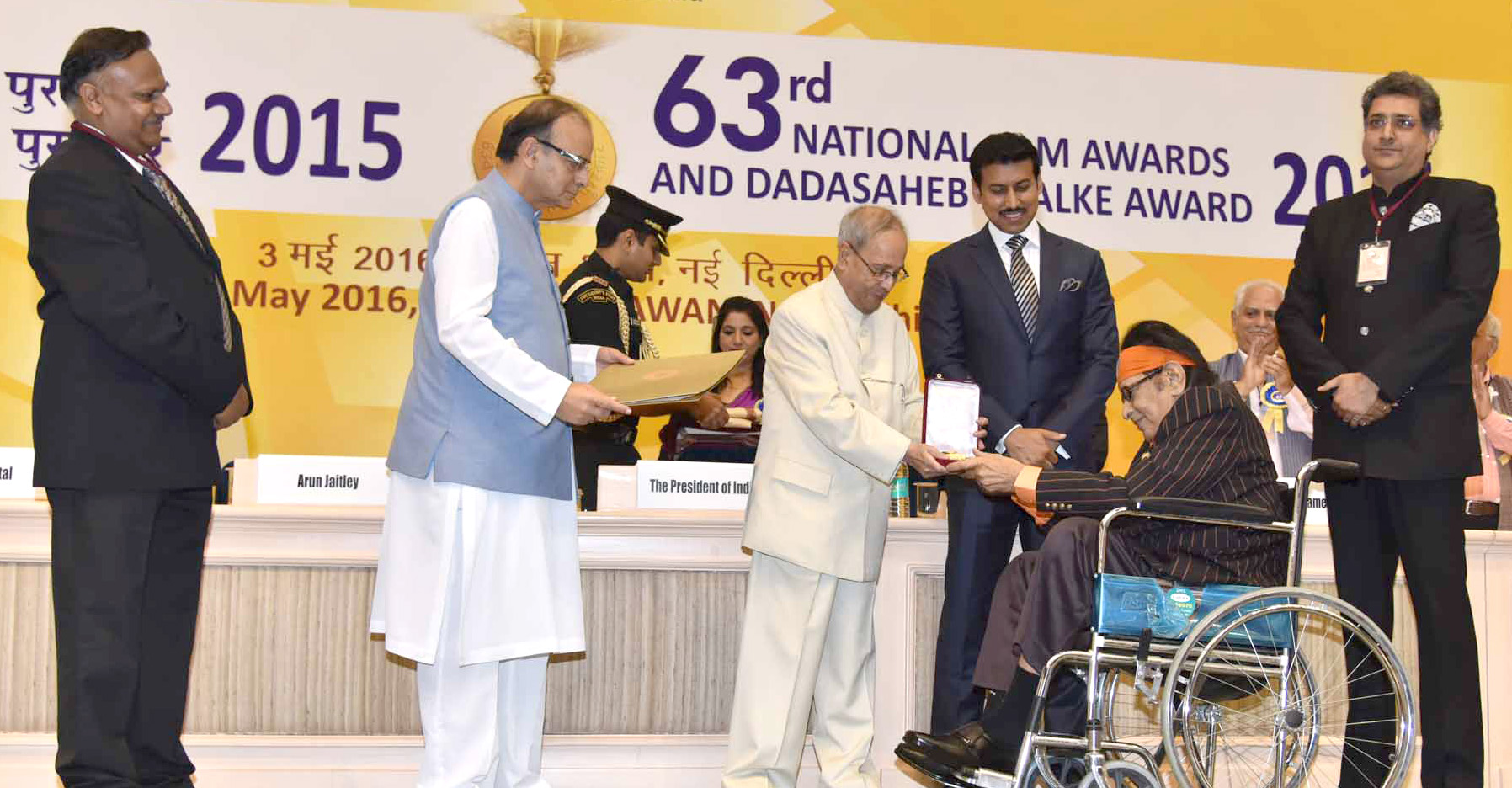
President of India Pranab Mukherjee presenting the Dadasaheb Phalke Award to Kumar at the 63rd National Film Awards in 2016

== Accolades and honours ==
=== Civilian award ===
Year	Honour	Result	Ref.
1992	Padma Shri	Honoured	

=== National Film Awards ===
Year	Category	Work	Result	Ref.
1968	Second Best Feature Film	Upkaar	Won	
2015	Dadasaheb Phalke Award	–	Honoured	

=== State honours ===
Year	Category	Work	Result	Ref.
2008	Kishore Kumar Award		Honoured	
2010	Raj Kapoor Award		Honoured	

=== Filmfare Awards ===
Year	Category	Work	Result	Ref.
1968	Best Film	Upkaar	Won	
1968	Best Director	Upkaar	Won	
1968	Best Story	Upkaar	Won	
1968	Best Dialogue	Upkaar	Won	
1968	Best Actor	Upkaar	Nominated	
1969	Best Supporting Actor	Aadmi	Nominated	
1972	Best Actor	Be-Imaan	Won	
1972	Best Director	Shor	Nominated	
1972	Best Story	Shor	Nominated	
1972	Best Editing	Shor	Won	
1975	Best Film	Roti Kapda Aur Makaan	Nominated	
1975	Best Director	Roti Kapda Aur Makaan	Won	
1975	Best Story	Roti Kapda Aur Makaan	Nominated	
1975	Best Actor	Roti Kapda Aur Makaan	Nominated	
1976	Best Actor	Sanyasi	Nominated	
1999	Lifetime Achievement Award	–	Honoured	

=== BFJA Awards ===
Year	Category	Work	Result	Ref.
1968	Best Dialogue	Upkaar	Won	

=== Other awards ===
- 2007 – Sardar Patel Lifetime Achievement International Award
- 2008 – Star Screen Lifetime Achievement Award
- 2010 – Lifetime Achievement Award at the 12th Mumbai Film Festival
- 2012 – Lifetime Achievement Award at the Apsara Film & Television Producers Guild Award
- 2012 – Lifetime Achievement Award at the Nashik International Film Festival
- 2012 – Bharat Gaurav Award in New Jersey, United States
- 2013 – Lifetime Achievement Award at the Jagran Film Festival
- 2019 – Lifetime Achievement Award from Power Brands at BFJA (Bollywood Film Journalists Awards)
- 2020 - Kalaimamani

=== Other honours ===
- 2008 – To honour Kumar, the Government of Madhya Pradesh decided to institute a Rs 100,000 award in his name. The state government also recommended Kumar's name for Bharat Ratna to the central government.
- 2011 – In recognition of the devotion of Kumar towards Shri Sai Baba, the Shri Saibaba Sansthan Trust in Shirdi renamed "Pimpalwadi Road" in Shirdi as "Manojkumar Goswami Road".
