= Rajkavi Inderjeet Singh Tulsi =

- Born: 2 April 1926; Kana Kacha, Punjab, British India
- Died: 11 May 1984 (aged 58); Bombay, India
- Occupations: Poet, author, bollywood lyricist
- Relatives: Simran Judge (granddaughter)
- Writing career
- Language: Punjabi, Urdu, Hindi
- Notable awards: Padma Shri (1966); Rajkavi (1962)
- Musical career

Rajkavi Inderjeet Singh Tulsi (2 April 1926 – 11 May 1984) was an Indian patriotic poet, Bollywood lyricist, and author. His writings in Punjabi, Hindi, and Urdu covered every aspect of life, including religion, romance, labor's life, country's struggles, etc. Moreover, he was known for the simplicity in his writings.

Tulsi was regarded as one of India's most influential poets. The Government of India honoured him with the Rajkavi in 1962 and the Padma Shri in 1966 for his contributions towards the arts.

== Early life ==
Tulsi was born on 2 April 1926 to Sardarni Basant Kaur and Sardar Mool Singh in Kanakaccha, Lahore, present-day Pakistan but then India. He lost his father when he was only 2 years old.

His father, belonging to the profession of landlords, had left him many lands. This was at the time that women could not own property and it was common to murder young male heirs for land. As he was the only son, his mother who taught Shabads and Kirtans (Sikh Hyms), would hide and cover him in white sheets until the age of 12, out of fear that people would kill him and snatch their land.

At the age of 9, when people were raising their voice against the British Raj, he was arrested by British Police for writing 6 lines of poetry which he recited on stage, requesting the Britishers to leave the country. Being a minor, he was released the same day.

In 1947, the partition between India and Pakistan and the environment due to that split at the moment, inspired him to continue his writing, while working for the Indian Railway.

He married Surinder Kaur at the age of 18, during his college years. After partition, the couple settled in Ferozpur, Punjab where he began work for the Indian Railways.

Tulsi's eldest son was a Punjabi Film Director and Oil Transport Businessman and granddaughter, Simran Judge is an American-Indian actor and model, who has appeared in several tv commercials, walked the runway for Lakme Fashion Week in India and was the lead of Ashutosh Gowariker's Everest. She is based in USA and has held senior positions in the Information Technology sector specializing in CyberSecurity and FinTech.

== Education ==
Tulsi was sent to Amritsar to study Ghyani (Singing of Sikh Hymns) at Khalsa College, Amritsar, Punjab.

== Fame ==
After partition, the couple moved to Ferozpur, where Tulsi obtained a job in the railways. While reciting poetry for a railway celebration, Railway Minister Jeevan Ram, impressed by his poetry gave him a promotion and transferred him to New Delhi. In New Delhi, Inderjeet Singh Tulsi was progressing, reciting poetry at Kavi Samelans.

In 1955, he was awarded the Raj Kavi (Poet Laureaut) of Punjab, by the Governor of Punjab.

During this time, Tulsi became very close to Indian Prime Minister Pandit Jawaharlal Nehru, who was very impressed by his poetry and was very fond of him. It was Nehru that invited him to recite poetry at numerous National Ceremonies, where Tulsi would be the first to open the show.

In 1966, Tulsi became very popular and a known figure in India after he was awarded the Padm Shree award for Arts and Literature.

During the Sino-Indian War, Tulsi was sent by Pandit Jawaharlal Nehru to the frontier areas of Ladakh to boost the morale of the soldiers. While reciting poetry there, a soldier happened to be alone at a big height, where he was not able to hear his poetry. Tulsi especially walked up 1000 ft high area and went to that soldier so that he could boost his morale.

After returning from Ladakh, Tulsi wrote his first book of various collections of poetry in Hindi and Punjabi: "Baraf Bane Angaare" (Snow turns into Fire Balls), inspired by the troops and his time spent in Ladak, followed by his second book, "Sur Singhar" (Beauty of Melody).

He also wrote books on the Sikh religion. One was specifically focused on the first Sikh Guru, Guru Nanak's Life, called "Param Purukh Guru Nanak Dev Ji" and the second was on the last guru, called "Darvesh Padshah Guru Gobind Singh Ji". He was also a senior executive at Indian Railways by then.

== Bollywood career ==
Tulsi gained recognition in 1962 when he was titled the Rajkavi of Punjab by the governor of Punjab, Narhar Vishnu Gadgil. Following the Rajkavi award, in 1966, he was awarded the Padma Shri Award for his contribution to Arts and Education by Indian Prime Minister, Jawaharlal Nehru. He is also the author of Param Purkh (Guru Nanak Patshah), Darvesh Badshah Guru Gobind Singh Ji, which continue to be a part of Punjab University's Syllabus today, Baraf Bane Angare, and Sur Shinghar.

Being a patriotic poet, Raj Kavi Tulsi was more focused and interested in serving his country and never thought of writing songs for films. A few years later, Manoj Kumar was attending a Kavi Darbar, where he heard Rajkavi Inderjeet Singh reciting one of his poems. Manoj Kumar really appreciated his work and requested him to write for his upcoming film Shor, i.e. Pani Re Pani Tera Rang Kaisa and Jeevan Chalne Ka Naam. The songs became a hit and Rajkavi Inderjeet Singh Tulsi went on to work with many more filmmakers like Raj Kapoor, N.N. Sippy, and B.R. Chopra. He continued to deliver hits like Le Jayenge Le Jayenge Dilwale Dulhanya Le Jayenge (Chor Machaye Shor), Beshak Mandir Masjid Todo (Bobby), Samay Tu Dheere Dheere Chal (Karm), and Jaa Re Jaa Oo Harjayee (Kalicharan).

He went on to produce Punjabi films under his own banner "Tulsi Productions", called "yaar Gariba Da" starring Yograj Singh and Geeta Behl, and "Ladli" starring Kiran Kumar and pakistani heroine Zaira.

== Death ==
On 11 May 1984, Tulsi died from a heart attack. He had always hoped that, when his time came, he would depart while on stage, and so he did, reciting poetry.

== Awards ==
- In 1962, Rajkavi Inderjeet Singh Tulsi was awarded with the Rajkavi Title of Punjab by the governor of Punjab, Narhar Vishnu Gadgil
- In 1966, Rajkavi Inderjeet Singh Tulsi was awarded with the Padma Shri Award (the fourth highest civilian award in the Republic of India) for his contribution in Arts and Education by Indian Prime Minister, Jawaharlal Nehru.

== Filmography ==
=== As a lyricist ===
- Shor 1972
- Bobby
- Chor Machaye Shor 1974
- Sauda 1974
- Do Jasoos 1975
- Zameer 1975
- Fakira 1976
- Kalicharan 1976
- Santo Banto 1976 Punjabi Movie
- Karm 1977
- Pratima Aur Paayal 1977
- Zamaanat
- Bhakti Mein Shakti 1978
- Laadli 1978-Punjabi Movie
- Vishwanath (film) 1978
- Ahimsa 1979
- Jaandaar 1979
- Raaj Mahal 1982
- The Gold Medal 1984
- Yaar Gareeba Daa 1986 Punjabi Movie

=== As an author ===
- Baraf Bani Angare
- Darvesh Badshah Guru Gobind Singhji
- Sur Singar – Poetry
- Param Purkh (Guru Nanak Patshah) – Depicts the life of Guru Nanak Dev Ji through poems
