= Sayeeda Khan =

Indian actress (1949–1990)

- Born: 24 October 1949; Calcutta, India
- Died: 21 October 1990 (aged 40); Mumbai, India
- Cause of death: Murder
- Other name: Sudha Sadanah
- Occupations: Actress; film producer
- Spouse: Brij Sadanah (1960s–1990)
- Children: 2 (including Kamal)
- Relatives: Shagufta Rafique (sister)

Sayeeda Khan (also known as Sudha Sadanah; 24 October 1949 – 21 October 1990) was an Indian actress who appeared in Hindi films. She began her screen career playing leading roles in comedies such as Apna Haath Jagannath (1960) and Main Shaadi Karne Chala (1962), as well as the romance Kanch Ki Gudiya (1961). She later shifted to supporting roles, including in Kanyadaan (1968).

Khan was the wife of film producer Brij Sadanah and mother of Bollywood actor Kamal Sadanah.

== Early life ==
Sayeeda Khan was born in Kolkata (then known as Calcutta) on 24 October 1949, into an Indian Muslim family. Her mother, Anwari Begum, was a dancer in films. Khan had a younger sister Shagufta Rafique (adopted), who went on to become a well-known writer in Mukesh Bhatt-films.

Actress Jyothika is Khan's niece through marriage with Brij Sadanah; his brother Chander and Chander's wife Seema (née Shama Kazi) are Jyothika's parents.

== Career ==
Interested in acting since her childhood, Khan entered the film industry as the protege of filmmaker H. S. Rawail. Khan early featured in films such as Apna Haath Jagannath (1960) and Kanch Ki Gudiya (1961), which earned her popularity. She was paired opposite notable actors of the time, such as Kishore Kumar, Manoj Kumar, Raaj Kumar and Biswajit Chatterjee, although her subsequent work failed to propel her career.

Khan's career prospects diminished by mid-1960s as her films failed, and she started working in B-grade and C-grade films. She played supporting roles in Kanyadaan and Vaasna (both 1968) to critical praise.

She retired from acting post-marriage. In the 1980s, Khan was credited as a producer in a few of her husband's directorial ventures.

== Personal life and death ==
Khan married film producer Brij Sadanah in late 1960s, converting to Hinduism and changing her name to Sudha Sadanah. The couple had two children: a daughter Namrata and a son Kamal (b. 1970).

She died on 21 October 1990—during her son's 20th birthday celebrations—when her drunk husband shot her and their children before shooting himself. Kamal survived as the gunshot missed him.

Kamal went to become a Bollywood actor in the early 1990s. In 2013, he created a short film, titled A Moment of Pause recollecting the events of the night his father killed off the family.

== Filmography ==
- Apna Haath Jagannath (1960)
- Honeymoon (1960)
- Modern Girl (1961)
- Wanted (1961)
- Flat No. 9 (1961)
- Kanch Ki Gudiya (1961)
- Hum Matwale Naujawan (1961)
- Main Shaadi Karne Chala (1962)
- Char Dervesh (1964)
- Sindbad Alibaba and Aladdin (1965)
- Saiyan Se Bhaile Milanwa (1965)
- Main Hoon Alladdin (1965)
- Bekhabar (1965)
- Ek Saal Pehle (1965)
- Ye Zindagi Kitni Haseen Hai (1966)
- Kanyadaan (1968)
- Vaasna (1968)
- Murder on Highway (1970)
