= Vishkanya (film) =

- Directed by: Jag Mundhra
- Produced by: Salila Parida
- Starring: Kunal Goswami; Pooja Bedi
- Edited by: Ashoke Bandekar
- Music by: Bappi Lahiri
- Release date: 30 July 1991
- Running time: 143 minutes
- Country: India
- Language: Hindi

Vishkanya is a 1991 Indian Hindi-language action fantasy film, directed by Jag Mundhra and produced by Salila Parida. This is the debut movie of Indian actress, model Pooja Bedi and Riya Sen as the child actress. This film was released on 30 July 1991.

== Plot ==
Inspector Rakesh Verma is investigating a case of mysterious deaths in a remote village. His investigations take him to meet two people, namely Thakur Dhurjan Singh and Lala Lachiram, both fearful for their lives. Rakesh learns that both are connected to the criminal activities. He is required to provide protection to them. His investigations revealed that one Trilokchand, a former jailbird, is a prime suspect. But presently, Trilok uses a wheelchair. Rakesh now realises that it is a revenge story of a young girl for her parents' murder. Long ago, Thakur Durjan Singh and Lala Lachiram were involved with illegal snake skin smuggling. One day, forest officer Vikram Singh comes into their circle with his wife Sonali and daughter Nisha. Vikram Singh tries to arrest the smugglers, and they kill Vikram and Sonali. Only Nisha is left. Nisha's Grandpa Trilokchand comes into the house and sees the dead bodies; he promises, that he must take revenge. He is framed by Zoravar, and Trilok is found guilty of murder and serves 11 years in jail. Nisha, although a simple girl of a village, recollects the murder scene of his parents. Her uncle Bajrang takes her to a Tantrik's who gives a snake poison pill to Nisha, and due to such pill, she becomes a Vishkanya (Poison girl). When her grandfather Trilok returns from jail, they jointly take revenge.

== Cast ==
- Kunal Goswami as Inspector Rakesh
- Pooja Bedi as Nisha
- Kabir Bedi as Vikram Singh
- Moon Moon Sen as Mrs. Vikram
- Satish Kaushik as Lala Lachiram
- Goga Kapoor as Durjan Singh
- Ananth Narayan Mahadevan as Bajrang
- Rajesh Vivek as Raghav
- Surendra Pal as Zorawar
- Riya Sen as Baby Nisha
- Vikas Anand as DIG
- Akash Khurana as Trilokchand

== Soundtrack ==
#	Title	Singer(s)
1	"Jaane Jaan Mujhe Aisa Kya Hua"	Pankaj Udhas, Penaz Masani
2	"Jaaneman Saamjho Ishaare"	Sharon Prabhakar
3	"Kya Karoon Allah Allah Allah"	Penaz Masani
4	"Rabba Yeh Dhadkan Kaisi Hai"	Penaz Masani
5	"Raja Mohe"	Alka Yagnik, Sudesh Bhosle
