= Apna Haath Jagannath =

- Directed by: Mohan Segal
- Written by: G. D. Madgulkar (story); Rajinder Singh Bedi (dialogue)
- Starring: Kishore Kumar; Sayeeda Khan; Leela Chitnis; Nasir Hussain
- Cinematography: C. S. Puttu
- Music by: Sachin Dev Burman
- Production company: Deluxe Films
- Release date: 1960
- Country: India
- Language: Hindi

Apna Haath Jagannath is a 1960 Indian Hindi-language film directed by Mohan Segal. The film's music was composed by Sachin Dev Burman.

Apna Haath Jagannath follows Madan (played by Kishore Kumar), the son of an impoverished aristocrat, who takes up manual labour despite his father's disappointment and the disapproval of his future in-laws. Besides Kumar, the cast includes Sayeeda Khan, Leela Chitnis, and Nasir Hussain.

The film premiered in Bombay on 19 February 1960, and was subsequently reviewed by The Times of India under the title "Apna Haath Jagannath — A Purposeful Entertainer".

== Cast ==
- Kishore Kumar
- Sayeeda Khan
- Leela Chitnis
- Nasir Hussain
- Jagdev
- Nandkishore
- Shivraj
- Sabita Chatterjee
