= Krorepati =

- Directed by: Mohan Segal
- Starring: Kishore Kumar; Shashikala
- Music by: Shankar–Jaikishan
- Release date: 1961
- Country: India
- Language: Hindi

Krorepati is a 1961 Indian Hindi-language comedy film directed by Mohan Segal. It is one of Segal's best-known films and stars actor-singer Kishore Kumar. Its soundtrack was composed by Shankar–Jaikishan.

The film, which also starred Shashikala, entered production in 1955 and was certified by the censor board in April 1961. Despite Kumar's established career as a singer, Manna Dey provided playback vocals for him in the song "Pehle Murgi Hui Thi Ki Anda".

Krorepati premiered at Swastik Theatre, Bombay, on 26 May 1961. It was described as a "boisterous comedy" by a reviewer for The Times of India. The film was reported to be popular with audiences.
