= The Gold Medal (film) =

- Poster
- Directed by: Ravikant Nagaich
- Written by: Jagdish Kanwal (dialogues); Hasrat Jaipuri; Indeevar; Verma Malik; Rajkavi Inderjeet Singh Tulsi,(lyrics)
- Screenplay by: Sham Behl
- Story by: Sham Behl
- Produced by: Sham Behl
- Starring: Jeetendra; Dharmendra (guest); Shatrughan Sinha; Rakhee Gulzar
- Cinematography: Ravikant Nagaich
- Edited by: Jagdish Kanwal
- Music by: Shankar Jaikishan
- Production company: Time Films
- Release date: 1984
- Running time: 124 minutes
- Country: India
- Language: Hindi

The Gold Medal is a 1984 Hindi-language spy film, produced by Sham Behl under the Time Films banner and directed by Ravikant Nagaich. It stars Jeetendra, Rakhee Gulzar, Shatrughan Sinha while Dharmendra in a special appearance. The music was composed by Shankar Jaikishan.

The film's production started in 1969. It remained in development hell for years and was eventually released in 1984.

== Plot ==
During the investigation of the political assassination of labor leader Acharya, Mr. David, the chief of the Secret Services becomes aware of a dangerous organisation working against the national interest. He deputises a promising young officer of his department, Gopal, to inquire into the activities of the gang and establish the identity of its leader.

While Gopal sets out to take down the gang, he falls victim to their vicious plot. Gopal is accused of the murder of Bindu, the dancer at Eagle nightclub and thus has to go underground to save himself from the police. But, Gopal uses this opportunity to infiltrate the gang as a trusted member and unmask the criminal mastermind, and he becomes entangled in a web of deceit and double-crossing.

== Cast ==
- Dharmendra as Labor Leader Acharya (Cameo Appearance)
- Jeetendra as Gopal
- Rakhee Gulzar as Shobha / Dimple
- Shatrughan Sinha as Shatrughan
- Premnath as Thakur Ranvir Singh
- K. N. Singh as Mr. Singh
- Rajkavi Inderjeet Singh Tulsi as Sikh man reading the poet on the stage
- Jagdish Raj as Inspector Chaudhary
- David as CBI Head
- Bindu as Bindu
- Jayshree T. as Courtesan
- Sunder as Gopal's Assistant
- Malti
- Faryal as Kitty
- Madhumati

== Soundtrack ==
#	Song	Singer
1	"Azadi Aayi Bhi To Kya"	Mohammed Rafi
2	"Aye Mere Desh Ke"	Rajkavi Inderjeet Singh Tulsi
3	"Dheere Dheere Mere"	Sharda
4	"Mere Kaatil Utha Botal"	Asha Bhosle
5	"Zamana Hare Note Ka"	Mahendra Kapoor
6	"Main Tumko Dekhti Hoon"	Asha Bhosle
