= 15th Filmfare Awards =

1968 awards for Hindi cinema

- Date: 1968
- Site: Bombay

Highlights
- Best Film: Upkar
- Best Actor: Dilip Kumar for Ram Aur Shyam
- Best Actress: Nutan for Milan
- Most awards: Upkar (7)
- Most nominations: Upkar (10)

The 15th Filmfare Awards were held in 1968, recognising the best Hindi cinema films in 1967.

Upkar led the ceremony with 10 nominations, followed by Milan with 9 nominations.

Upkar won 7 awards, including Best Film, Best Director (for Manoj Kumar) and Best Supporting Actor (for Pran), thus becoming the most-awarded film at the ceremony.

== Main awards ==
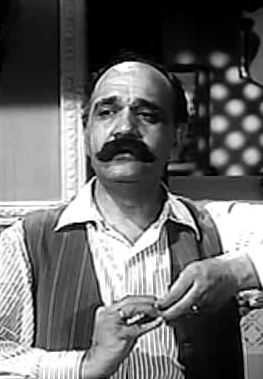
Om Prakash, Best Comic Actor

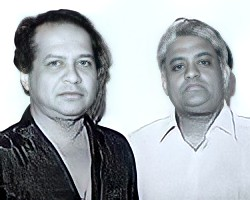
Laxmikant Pyarelal, Best Music Director

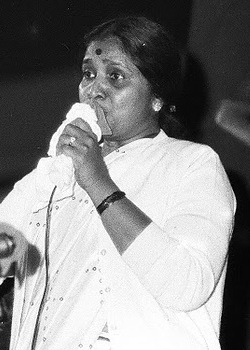
Asha Bhosle, Best Female Playback Singer

=== Best Film ===
Upkar

- Mehrban
- Milan

=== Best Director ===
Manoj Kumar – Upkar

- A. Bhimsingh – Mehrban
- A. Subba Rao – Milan

=== Best Actor ===
Dilip Kumar – Ram Aur Shyam

- Manoj Kumar – Upkar
- Sunil Dutt – Milan

=== Best Actress ===
Nutan – Milan

- Saira Banu – Shagird
- Waheeda Rehman – Ram Aur Shyam

=== Best Supporting Actor ===
Pran – Upkar

- Ashok Kumar – Mehrban
- Om Prakash – Dus Lakh

=== Best Supporting Actress ===
Jamuna – Milan

- Mumtaz – Ram Aur Shyam
- Tanuja – Jewel Thief

=== Best Comic Actor ===
Om Prakash – Dus Lakh

- Johnny Walker – Pati Patni
- Mehmood – Mehrban

=== Best Story ===
Upkar – Manoj Kumar

- Aasra – Pratibha Bose
- Mehrban – Asha Poorna Devi

=== Best Dialogue ===
Upkar – Manoj Kumar

=== Best Music Director ===
Milan – Laxmikant–Pyarelal

- Hamraaz – Ravi
- Upkar – Kalyanji-Anandji

=== Best Lyricist ===
Upkar – Gulshan Bawra for Mere Desh Ki Dharti

- Hamraaz – Sahir Ludhianvi for Neele Gagan Ke Tale
- Milan – Anand Bakshi for Saawan Ka Mahina

=== Best Playback Singer, Male ===
Hamraaz – Mahendra Kapoor for Neele Gagan Ke Tale

- Upkar – Mahendra Kapoor for Mere Desh Ki Dharti
- Milan – Mukesh for Saawan Ka Mahina

=== Best Playback Singer, Female ===
Dus Lakh – Asha Bhosle for Garibon Ki Suno

- Aakhri Khat – Lata Mangeshkar for Baharon Mera Jeevan
- Milan – Lata Mangeshkar for Saawan Ka Mahina

=== Best Art Direction, B&W ===
Taqdeer – H.V. Maharudria

=== Best Art Direction, Color ===
Chandan Ka Palna – Abdul Rahim

=== Best Cinematography, B&W ===
Baharon Ke Sapne

=== Best Cinematography, Color ===
Hamraaz

=== Best Sound ===
Jewel Thief

=== Best Editing ===
Upkar

== Critics' awards ==
=== Best Documentary ===
India '67

== Biggest Winners ==
- Upkar – 7/10
- Milan – 3/9

== See also ==
- 17th Filmfare Awards
- 16th Filmfare Awards
- Filmfare Awards
