= Santosh Anand =

Indian lyricist

- Born: 5 March 1929 (age 97); Sikandrabad, Bulandshahr, United Provinces, British India
- Education: Aligarh Muslim University
- Occupation: Lyricist

Santosh Anand (born 5 March 1929) is an Indian lyricist who attained success in the 1970s, earning the Filmfare Award for Best Lyricist twice in 1975 and 1983. He has also been awarded the Yash Bharti Award in 2016. He studied library science at Aligarh Muslim University

== Career ==
Santosh Anand was born in the town of Sikandrabad District Bulandshahr (30 km from Ghaziabad on G T Road towards Buland shahar). He began his career in 1970 with the film Purab Aur Paschim. This film's soundtrack was composed by Kalyanji-Anandji. He wrote his favorite song "Ek Pyar Ka Naghma Hai" in 1972 film Shor. It was composed by Laxmikant-Pyarelal and sung by Mukesh and Lata Mangeshkar. He provided lyrics for the 1974 film Roti Kapda Aur Makaan, also composed by Laxmikant-Pyarelal. Its song included "Aur Nahin Bas Aur Nahin," sung by Mahendra Kapoor, and the duet "Main Na Bhoolunga," sung by Mukesh and Lata Mangeshkar. Santosh obtained his first Filmfare Award for Best Lyricist for that film.

He penned the songs for the film Kranti (1981), the highest-grossing Hindi film of that year. The same year, he penned songs such as "Tera Saath Hai To" and "Megha Re Megha Re" in the film Pyaasa Sawan. In 1982, he penned the song "Mohabbat Hai Kya Cheez" under Laxmikant-Pyarelal in the film Prem Rog. He was awarded his second and last Filmfare Award for Best Lyricist for this song. He has penned a total of 109 songs in 26 films.

== Collaborations ==
Santosh Anand started his career in the 1970 film Purab Aur Paschim under Kalyanji-Anandji. His soundtracks such as Shor, Roti Kapda Aur Makan, Kranti, Pyaasa Sawan and Prem Rog all had music by Laxmikant-Pyarelal. His only collaboration with music directors is limited to L-P.

His songs "Ek Pyar Ka Naghma Hai", "Main Na Bhoolunga", "Yeh Galiyan Yeh Chaubara", "Tera Saath Hai To", "Megha Re Megha Re" were all sung by the singer Lata Mangeshkar. Anuradha Paudwal also sung for him in movies like Junoon (1992) and Tahalka (1992). Among male singers, Mukesh, Mahendra Kapoor and Mohammed Aziz sang songs penned by him.

== Selected discography ==
1. Purab Aur Pachhim (1970)
2. Shor (1972)
3. Roti Kapada Aur Makaan (1974)
4. Patthar Se Takkar (1980)
5. Kranti (1981)
6. Pyaasa Sawan (1981)
7. Prem Rog (1982)
8. Mera Jawab (1985)
9. Patthar Dil (1985)
10. Love 86 (1986)
11. Mazloom (1986)
12. Bade Ghar Ki Beti (1989)
13. Naag Nagin (1989)
14. Santosh (1989)
15. Suryaa: An Awakening (1989)
16. Do Matwale (1991)
17. Naag Mani (1991)
18. Ranbhoomi (1991)
19. Junoon (1992)
20. Sangeet (1992)
21. Tahalka (1992)
22. Tirangaa (1993)
23. Sangam Ho Ke Rahega (1994)
24. Prem Aggan (1998)

== Awards ==
Year	Award	Category	Film	Song	Result
1973	Filmfare Awards	Best Lyricist	Shor	Ek Pyaar Ka Nagma Hain	Nominated
1975	Filmfare Awards	Best Lyricist	Roti Kapda Aur Makaan	Main Na Bhooloonga	Won
1975	Filmfare Awards	Best Lyricist	Roti Kapda Aur Makaan	Aur Nahin Bas Aur Nahin	Nominated
1982	Filmfare Awards	Best Lyricist	Kranti	Zindagi Ki Naa Toote	Nominated
1983	Filmfare Awards	Best Lyricist	Prem Rog	Mohabbat Hai Kya Cheez	Won
2016	Yash Bharti Award	Songwriting	—N/a		Won
