= Main Shaadi Karne Chala =

1962 Indian film

- Directed by: Roop K. Shorey
- Starring: Feroz Khan; Sayeeda Khan
- Music by: Chitragupt
- Release date: 1962
- Country: India
- Language: Hindi

Main Shaadi Karne Chala is a 1962 Indian Hindi-language film directed by Roop K. Shorey. Shot partially in colour, it was Feroz Khan's first film as a leading actor, opposite actress Sayeeda Khan.

== Cast ==
- Feroz Khan
- Sayeeda Khan

== Music ==
The film's music director was Chitragupt and playback singers included Manna Dey.

== Release and reception ==
The film was released in 1962. It was publicized in Thought journal for featuring "Kashmir Sequences in Lovely Eastman Colour".

A critic for The Times of India said that the comedy is "amusing in parts". Baburao Patel of Mother India likewise called it "a frivolous tale which is quite amusing at places", and "a humorous design for the tragic purpose of making people pay out money for froth without asking for the liquid".
