= Mere Desh Ki Dharti =

Song
- Language: Hindi
- Released: 1967
- Composer: Kalyanji–Anandji
- Lyricist: Gulshan Kumar Mehta

"Mere Desh Ki Dharti" (lit. 'My country's soil') is a Hindi song from the 1967 Hindi film Upkar. The lyrics of the song were written by Gulshan Kumar Mehta, and the music was composed by Kalyanji–Anandji. Mahendra Kapoor was the playback singer. This is a patriotic song, and was picturised on Manoj Kumar in the film. The song earned Kumar the nickname Mr. Bharat.

== Theme ==
The song glorifies the land of India, the lyricist's motherland. He says the land of his country grows gold, diamond, and pearl. Here he compares the crops grown by the farmers of the country as these expensive gems.

== Personalities ==
Following great Indian personalities are mentioned in the song. Following is in the order they appear. 1. Gautam Buddha 2. Guru Nanak 3. Mahatma Gandhi 4. Subhash Chandra Bose 5. Rabindranath Tagore 6. Bal Gangadhar Tilak 7. Hari Singh Nalwa 8. Lal Bahadur Shastri 9. Shaheed Bhagat Singh 10. Jawahar Lal Nehru

== Awards and reception ==
This is an all-time popular Hindi patriotic song. In 1968 Gulshan Kumar Mehta received a Filmfare Award for Best Lyricist for this song. Mahendra Kapoor, the male playback singer, won a President's silver medal.
