= Kanch Ki Gudiya =

- Directed by: H. S. Rawail
- Starring: Manoj Kumar; Sayeeda Khan
- Release date: 1961
- Country: India
- Language: Hindi

Kanch Ki Gudiya is a 1961 Indian Hindi-language film directed by H. S. Rawail. It features Manoj Kumar and Sayeeda Khan in lead roles, and proved to be a breakthrough for both actors. The film was reviewed by The Times of India on 14 May 1961 under the title "Rawail's Kanch Ki Gudiya A Creditable Motion Picture".

== Cast ==
- Manoj Kumar
- Sayeeda Khan
- Mumtaz Begum

== Music ==
The film's music was composed by Sudhirkar.
