= Kunal Goswami =

Indian actor

- Born: 24 November 1960 (age 65)
- Occupations: Actor, business person
- Parent: Manoj Kumar (father)

Kunal Goswami is an Indian former actor and businessman who starred in film and television. He is the son of Indian actor and producer-director Manoj Kumar.

== Biography ==
Goswami made his Bollywood debut in his father's 1981 film Kranti. He played his first leading role in the 1983 films Ghungroo and Kalakaar. In Kalakaar, Sridevi was his co-star and the hit song "Neele Neele Ambar Par" was focused on his character. Goswami starred in several other films including Do Gulab (1983), Ricky (1986), Aakhri Baazi (1989) and Paap Ki Kamaee (1990). After the release of Numbri Aadmi and Vishkanya in 1991, he took a hiatus from acting for several years. Goswami attempted to revive his career in the 1999 film Jai Hind, which was directed by his father.

In 2000, Goswami starred the television serial Alag Alag, which was telecast on DD National.

== Personal life ==
Goswami has an older brother named Vishal. In 2005 he married his wife, Riti. He now runs a catering business in Delhi.

== Filmography ==
=== Films ===
Year	Film	Role	Notes
1981	Kranti	Bharat and Meenakshi's Son	Debut film
1983	Ghungroo	Yuvraj	
1983	Kalakaar	Ravi Kumar	
1983	Do Gulab	Heera	
1986	Ricky	Ricky	
1989	Aakhri Baazi	Inspector Laxman	
1990	Paap Ki Kamaee		
1991	Numbri Aadmi	Raj Pratap	
1991	Vishkanya	Inspector Rakesh Verma	
1999	Jai Hind	Vijay	
2009	Contract Online		Short film

=== Television ===
Year	Show	Role	Channel
2000	Alag Alag		DD National
