= Mohan Segal =

Indian film director and producer

- Born: 1 December 1921; Jalandhar, British India
- Died: 19 October 2005 (aged 83); Mumbai, India
- Occupations: Film director, producer
- Years active: 1950s–1970s
- Known for: Saas Bhi Kabhi Bahu Thi (1970)
- Relatives: Sharmin Segal (granddaughter)

Mohan Segal (1 December 1921–19 October 2005) was an Indian film director and producer who worked primarily in Hindi cinema. Active mainly during the 1950s and 1960s, he is remembered for directing several commercially successful films and for introducing or mentoring actors who later became prominent in the Indian film industry.

== Life ==
Mohan Sehgal was born on 1 December 1921 in Jalandhar, British India.

He is known for introducing Rekha into the Bollywood in 1970 with Sawan Bhadon. He is the grandfather of actress Sharmin Segal.

== Filmography ==
Year	Film	Credited as	Special note
1951	Baazi	Assistant Director	First film association with Guru Dutt; worked as assistant director.
1954	Adhikar	Director	Mohan Segal's directorial debut.
1954	Aulad	Director	Early social drama directed by Mohan Segal.
1956	New Delhi	Director, Producer	Commercial success starring Kishore Kumar and Vyjayanthimala.
1959	Lajwanti	Producer	Won the Certificate of Merit at the 6th National Film Awards.
1960	Apna Haath Jagannath	Director, Producer	Satirical comedy starring Kishore Kumar.
1961	Krorepati	Director	Comedy starring Kishore Kumar, inspired by the Hollywood film The Million Pound Note.
1962	Dr. Vidya	Producer	Romantic drama starring Manoj Kumar and Vyjayanthimala.
1962	Anpadh	Executive Producer	Remembered for the classic song "Aap Ki Nazron Ne Samjha."
1964	Majboor	Producer	Directed by Narendra Suri; starred Biswajeet and Waheeda Rehman.
1966	Devar	Director, Producer	Family drama starring Dharmendra, Sharmila Tagore and Deven Verma.
1968	Kanyadaan	Director	Romantic drama starring Shashi Kapoor and Asha Parekh.
1969	Sajan	Director, Producer	Romantic drama starring Manoj Kumar and Asha Parekh.
1970	Sawan Bhadon	Director, Producer	Launched Rekha and Navin Nischol as Hindi film leads.
1970	Maharaja	Producer	Costume drama starring Sanjeev Kumar.
1970	Saas Bhi Kabhi Bahu Thi	Director	Family drama starring Sanjeev Kumar and Leena Chandavarkar.
1971	Sansar	Producer	Family social drama produced by Mohan Segal.
1973	Intezar	Producer	Romantic drama starring Rakesh Roshan and Padmini Kapila.
1974	Woh Main Nahin	Director, Producer	Adaptation of P. K. Atre's celebrated Marathi play To Mee Navhech.
1976	Santan (often misspelled "Suntan")	Director, Producer	Family drama starring Jeetendra and Rekha.
1977	Ek Hi Raasta	Director, Producer	Drama starring Jeetendra, Shabana Azmi and Vinod Mehra.
1979	Kartavya	Director, Producer	Action drama starring Dharmendra, Rekha and Vinod Mehra.
1982	Samraat	Director	Multi-starrer featuring Dharmendra, Jeetendra and Hema Malini.
1982	Daulat	Director	Multi-starrer featuring Vinod Khanna, Zeenat Aman and Raj Babbar.
1984	Hum Hain Lajawab	Director	Action-comedy starring Kumar Gaurav and Padmini Kolhapure.
1989	Kasam Suhaag Ki	Director	Final directorial venture; starred Dharmendra and Rekha.
