= Flat No. 9 =

- Directed by: Romesh Sharma
- Starring: Ashok Kumar; Sayeeda Khan
- Music by: Usha Khanna
- Release date: December 1, 1961; (Bombay)
- Country: India
- Language: Hindi

Flat No. 9 is a 1961 Indian Hindi-language film directed by Ramesh Sharma. The film stars Ashok Kumar and Sayeeda Khan. Its music was composed by Usha Khanna. Flat No. 9 was released in Bombay at Novelty Theatre on 1 December 1961.

== Cast ==
- Ashok Kumar
- Sayeeda Khan
- Dinesh Kumar
- Helen
- Jagdish

== Music ==
The film's music was composed by Usha Khanna.

Khanna considered the song "Aankhon Say Main Ne Pi Hai" from the film as one of her own favourites. Her work was praised by a Picture Post critic, who noted that the soundtrack of Flat No. 9 consisted of "at least three outstanding songs".
