= Aakhri Baazi =

1989 film by Ashim Samanta

- LP Vinyl Records Cover
- Directed by: Ashim S. Samanta
- Produced by: Shakti Samanta
- Starring: Govinda; Shatrughan Sinha; Moushumi Chatterjee; Mandakini; Sonam; Kunal Goswami
- Music by: Anu Malik
- Release date: 14 April 1989
- Running time: 2 hours 29 min
- Country: India
- Language: Hindi

Mastan (in Bengali) or Aakhri Baazi (in Hindi; transl. Playing the last hand) is a 1989 Indian bilingual action crime film directed by Ashim S. Samanta and starring Govinda, Shatrughan Sinha, Moushumi Chatterjee, Kunal Goswami, Mandakini and Sonam.

== Plot ==
Ram Kumar lives a wealthy lifestyle in Calcutta with his brother, Prashant and sister-in-law Parvati. Laxman, a young orphan he had befriended, also lives with them. When Laxman joins the police force, impressed with Laxman's dedication, the Police Commissioner assigns him to take down the empire of a notorious underworld don called Cobra. When Laxman is killed trying to arrest Cobra, Ram swears to avenge Laxman's death. Ram finds out that Prashant may be the man called Cobra. A series of double crosses and deceits lead to complications much more sinister than what Ram has imagined. Is Prashant the real culprit or a victim of mistaken identity? How does Ram annihilate Cobra and his empire of crime?

== Cast ==
- Govinda as Ram Kumar
- Pradeep Kumar as Cobra
- Shatrughan Sinha as Prashant Kumar/ PK
- Moushumi Chatterjee as Parvati
- Kunal Goswami as Inspector Laxman
- Mandakini as Rita
- Sonam as Sapna
- Sadashiv Amrapurkar as Shakaal
- Mac Mohan as Mac
- Sujit Kumar as Police Commissioner
- Manik Irani as Jagawar
- Dinesh Thakur as Durjan
- Ardhendu Bose as Cobra gang member
- Asit Sen as Announcer

== Soundtrack ==
#	Title	Singer(s)
1	"Diwani Diwani"	Sadhana Sargam
2	"Jaan Ki Ye Baazi"	Amit Kumar
3	"Ram Se Hai Laxman"	Suresh Wadkar & Amit Kumar
4	"Chori Chori Aap Mere"	Amit Kumar & Sadhana Sargam
5	"Hai Re Sama"	Amit Kumar, Suresh Wadkar & Sadhana Sargam
6	"Raam Se Hai Laxman"	Suresh Wadkar
