= 20th Filmfare Awards =

1973 awards for Hindi cinema

- Date: 21 April 1973
- Site: Bombay

Highlights
- Best Film: Be-Imaan
- Best Actor: Manoj Kumar for Be-Imaan
- Best Actress: Hema Malini for Seeta Aur Geeta
- Most awards: Be-Imaan (7)
- Most nominations: Amar Prem & Be-Imaan (8)

The 20th Filmfare Awards were held in 1973, awarding the films released in 1972.

Amar Prem and Be-Imaan led the ceremony with 8 nominations, followed by Shor with 7 nominations and Pakeezah with 5 nominations.

Be-Imaan won 7 awards, including Best Film, Best Director (for Sohanlal Kanwar), Best Actor (for Manoj Kumar) and Best Supporting Actor (for Pran), thus becoming the most-awarded film at the ceremony.

Rajesh Khanna received dual nominations for Best Actor for his performances in Amar Prem and Dushmun, but lost to Manoj Kumar who won the award for Be-Imaan.

At the ceremony, Meena Kumari earned a then record-setting twelfth and final nomination for the Filmfare Award for Best Actress for her performance in the period musical romantic drama Pakeezah after her death in March 1972. Despite being highly favored to win the award, she controversially lost the award to Hema Malini who won her first and only award in the category for her comic dual role in the comedy-drama Seeta Aur Geeta.

Pran, who won Best Supporting Actor for Be-Imaan, refused to accept the award, on the grounds that the Best Music Director award should have gone to Ghulam Mohammed for Pakeezah, and not Shankar-Jaikishan for Be-Imaan.

== Main Awards ==
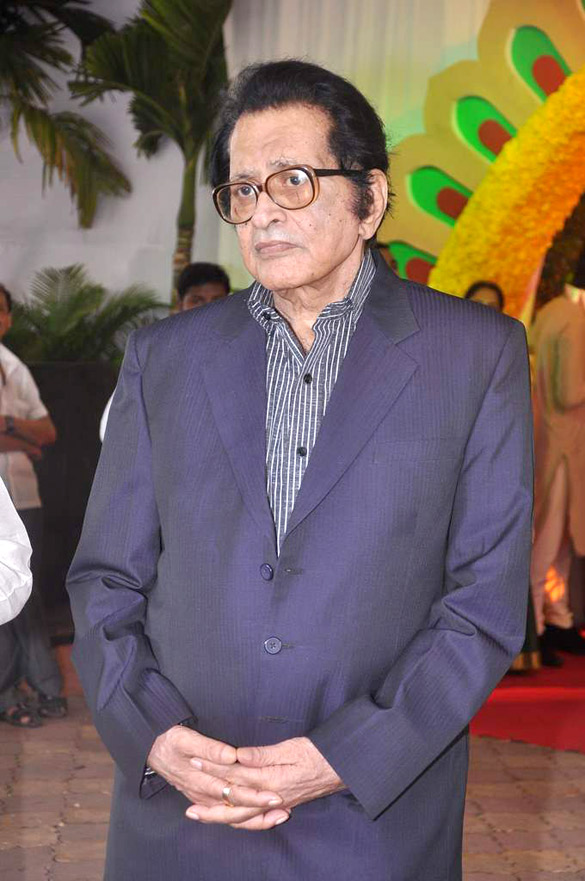
Manoj Kumar — Best Actor winner for Be-Imaan

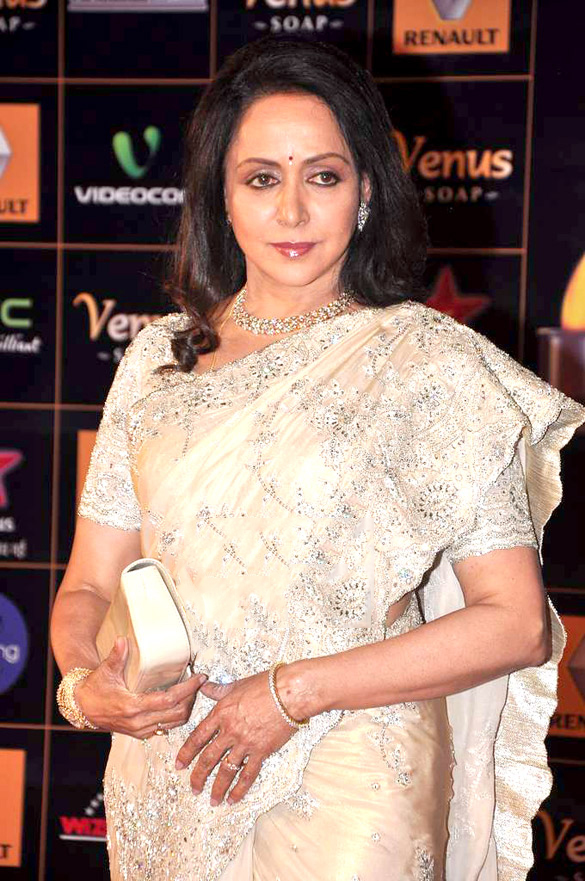
Hema Malini — Best Actress winner for Seeta Aur Geeta

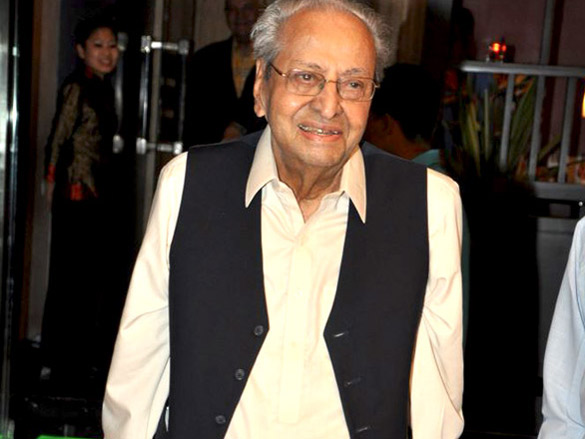
Pran — Best Supporting Actor winner for Be-Imaan

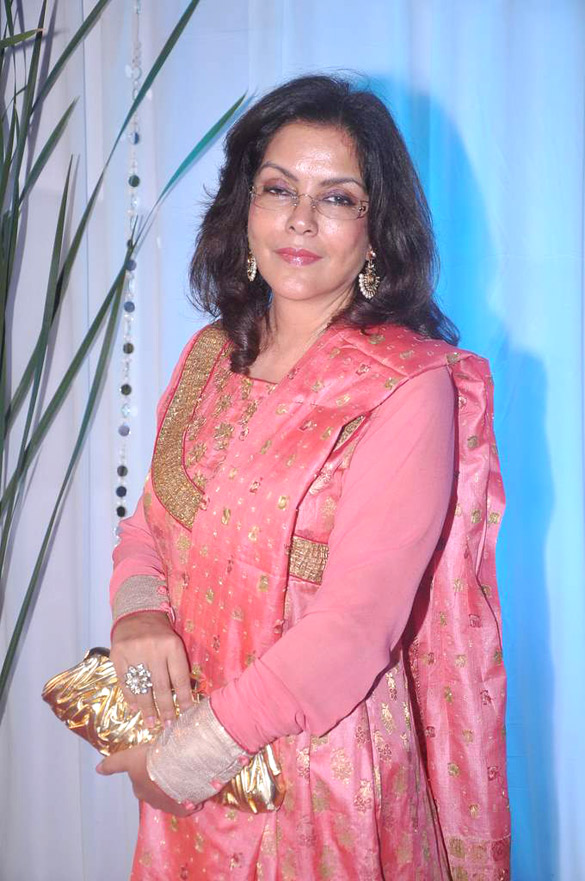
Zeenat Aman — Best Supporting Actress winner for Hare Rama Hare Krishna

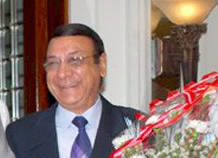
Paintal — Best Comic Actor winner for Bawarchi

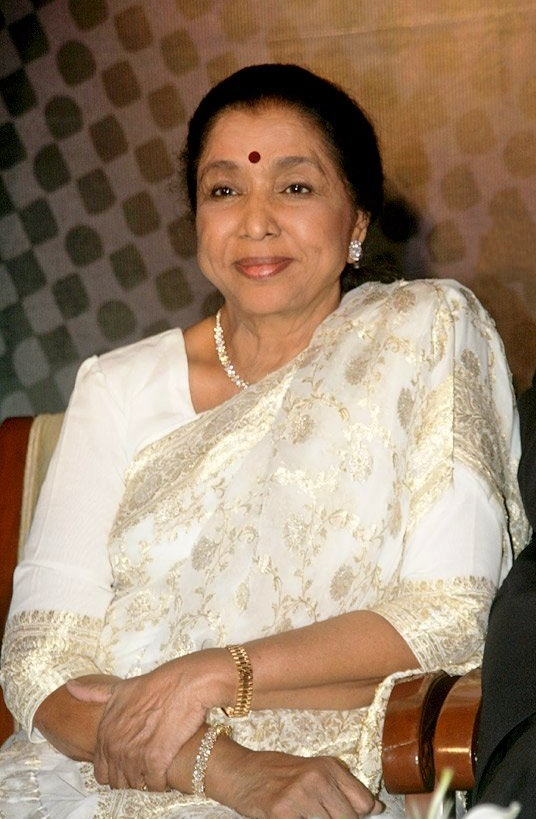
Asha Bhosle — Best Playback singer winner for "Dum Maro Dum" (Hare Rama Hare Krishna)

=== Best Film ===
Be-Imaan

- Anubhav
- Pakeezah

=== Best Director ===
Sohanlal Kanwar – Be-Imaan

- Kamal Amrohi – Pakeezah
- Manoj Kumar – Shor

=== Best Actor ===
Manoj Kumar – Be-Imaan

- Rajesh Khanna – Amar Prem
- Rajesh Khanna – Dushmun

=== Best Actress ===
Hema Malini – Seeta Aur Geeta

- Meena Kumari – Pakeezah
- Raakhee – Aankhon Aankhon Mein

=== Best Supporting Actor ===
Pran – Be-Imaan

- Premnath – Shor

=== Best Supporting Actress ===
Zeenat Aman – Hare Rama Hare Krishna

- Bindu – Dastaan
- Nazima – Be-Imaan

=== Best Comic Actor ===
Paintal – Bawarchi

- Jagdeep – Bhai Ho To Aisa
- Mehmood – Bombay To Goa

=== Best Story ===
Anubhav – Basu Chatterjee

- Shor – Manoj Kumar

=== Best Screenplay ===
Amar Prem – Arabinda Mukhopadhyay

=== Best Dialogue ===
Amar Prem – Ramesh Pant

=== Best Music Director ===
Be-Imaan – Shankar–Jaikishan

- Amar Prem – R. D. Burman
- Pakeezah – Ghulam Mohammed
- Shor – Laxmikant–Pyarelal

=== Best Lyricist ===
Be-Imaan – Verma Malik for Jai Bolo Be-Imaan Ki

- Amar Prem – Anand Bakshi for Chingari Koi Bhadke
- Shor – Santosh Anand for Ek Pyaar Ka Nagma Hai

=== Best Playback Singer, Male ===
Be-Imaan – Mukesh for Jai Bolo Be-Imaan Ki

- Amar Prem – Kishore Kumar for Chingari Koi Bhadke
- Shor – Mukesh for Ek Pyaar Ka Nagma Hai

=== Best Playback Singer, Female ===
Hare Rama Hare Krishna – Asha Bhosle for Dum Maro Dum

- Lal Patthar – Asha Bhosle for Suni Suni
- Lalkaar – Asha Bhosle for Maine Kahan Na Na Na

=== Best Art Direction ===
Pakeezah

=== Best Cinematography ===
Seeta Aur Geeta

=== Best Editing ===
Shor

=== Best Sound ===
Amar Prem

== Critics' awards ==
=== Best Film ===
Maya Darpan

=== Best Documentary ===
Nine Months to Freedom

== Controversy ==
Meena Kumari not winning an award for her performance in Pakeezah stirred controversy at the 20th Filmfare Awards. Filmfare, however, defended their decision by stating that according to their rules, posthumous awards were not allowed then; Filmfare's editor B. K. Karanjia said both Ghulam Mohammad (the music director of Pakeezah) and Josef Wirsching (cinematographer) lost for the same reason.

Years later, in an interview, veteran actress Rakhee Gulzar revealed that initially she was offered the award for Best actress which she declined, as she considered her performance to be mediocre as earlier, she was devoid of the award for her performance in Sharmilee.

== Biggest Winners ==
- Be-Imaan – 7/8
- Amar Prem – 3/8
- Seeta Aur Geeta – 2/2
- Hare Rama Hare Krishna – 2/2
- Shor – 1/7
- Pakeezah – 1/5

== See also ==
- 22nd Filmfare Awards
- 21st Filmfare Awards
- Filmfare Awards
