= Daulat (1982 film) =

1982 film by Mohan Segal

- Directed by: Mohan Segal
- Written by: S. M. Abbas
- Produced by: Jawaharlal B. Bafana, Vasant Doshi, C.D. Mehta, B.N. Shah
- Starring: Vinod Khanna; Raj Babbar; Zeenat Aman; Amjad Khan
- Music by: Rahul Dev Burman
- Distributed by: Milan Movies
- Release date: 1982
- Country: India
- Language: Hindi

Daulat is a 1982 Bollywood action film directed by Mohan Segal. The film stars Vinod Khanna, Raj Babbar, Zeenat Aman and Amjad Khan. The music was composed by R D Burman.

== Cast ==
- Vinod Khanna as Ravi/Kunwar Dilip Singh
- Zeenat Aman as Geeta
- Raj Babbar as Sushil
- Deven Verma as Murli
- Amjad Khan as Joseph D'Souza/Mr. Tripathi
- Shreeram Lagoo as Ghanshyam/Vikram Singh
- Om Shivpuri as Police Commissioner Chaudhary
- Chand Usmani as Mrs. Chaudhary
- Sarla Yeolekar as Sushma's Aunty
- Sarika as Sushma
- Ramesh Deo as Dharamdas
- Seema Deo as Radhika
- Birbal as Mothu
- Dev Kumar as Raghunath Singh
- Mac Mohan as Shekhar Singh
- Yunus Parvez as Daaga

== Music ==
The music was composed by Rahul Dev Burman and lyrics written by Vitthalbhai Patel and Nida Fazli.

Song	Singer
"Zindagi Yeh Zindagi"	Lata Mangeshkar
"Moti Ho To Bandhke Rakh Loon"	Kishore Kumar
"Tum Badi Khubsoorat Ho"	Kishore Kumar, Asha Bhosle
"Mohabbat Se Rangi Hai Har Kahani"	Asha Bhosle, Suresh Wadkar
"Main To Hoon Shola Badan"	Asha Bhosle
