= Pyaasa Sawan =

- Theatrical release poster
- Directed by: Dasari Narayana Rao
- Written by: Raj Baldev Raj (dialogues); Sonthosh Anand (lyrics)
- Screenplay by: Dasari Narayana Rao
- Story by: Dasari Narayana Rao
- Based on: Yedanthasthula Meda (1980)
- Produced by: Prasan Kapoor; Jeetendra (Presents)
- Starring: Jeetendra; Reena Roy; Moushmi Chatterji
- Cinematography: M. Kannappa
- Edited by: G.G. Krishna Rao
- Music by: Laxmikant Pyarelal
- Production company: Tirupati Pictures Enterprises
- Release date: 28 August 1981
- Running time: 161 minutes
- Country: India
- Language: Hindi

Pyaasa Sawan (transl. The Thirsty Monsoon) is a 1981 Hindi-language drama film, produced by Prasan Kapoor under the Tirupati Pictures Enterprises banner and written and directed by Dasari Narayana Rao. It stars Jeetendra, Reena Roy, Moushmi Chatterji and music composed by Laxmikant Pyarelal, Lyrics by Santosh Anand. The film is a remake of Telugu movie Yedanthasthula Meda (1980).

== Plot ==
Chandrakant, a young and energetic man, is in search of a job. Prabhudas, a millionaire, mistakes him for his wealthy friend's son, so, he offers him a job and also keeps him in his house under the intention to make his daughter Shanti's marriage with him. By the time he learns the truth, Chandrakant and Shanti love each other and they marry against their elders' wish. After the marriage, the couple experiences much difficulty. Once Prabhudas insults Chandrakant and Shanti before everyone. Distressed, Chandrakant decides to take avenge by earning money, so, builds a huge empire by hard labour. But in that process, he neglects his wife Shanti and is unable to give much time to her. Shanti becomes depressed, she gives birth to a baby boy Ravikant. After some time, Chandrakant awakes and understands the virtue of the wife. But till then it is too late, he learns that Shanti is terminally ill and will soon die. Chandrakant tries in to save her utilizing his entire wealth but he couldn't and she dies. Years roll by, Chandrakant raises his son Ravi with indulge, he loves and marries Manorama. After the marriage, Chandrakant assigns the business responsibilities to Ravi and leaves for a tour. Here Ravi becomes busy, repeats the same story with Manorama which leads to disputes and quarrels between the couple. Manorama leaves the house and the matter goes up to divorce. At that moment, Chandrakant arrives, makes Ravi understand the greatness of the wife by revealing his past. Immediately he rushes for Manorama, she also moves by the guidance of her parents. Finally, Chandrakant dies of a heart attack and before dying, he reunites his son and daughter-in-law.

== Cast ==
- Jeetendra as Chandrakant / Ravikant (double role)
- Moushumi Chatterji as Shanti
- Reena Roy as Manorama "Manu"
- Vinod Mehra as Jagannath (Manorama's father)
- Aruna Irani as Laxmi (Manorama's mother)
- Deven Verma as Sewakram
- Madan Puri as Prabhudas
- Ashalata Wabgaonkar as Parvati

== Soundtrack ==
Music composed by Laxmikant–Pyarelal, Lyrics by Santosh Anand

#	Song	Singer	Raga
1	"Main Wahan Hoon Jahan Hai"	Kishore Kumar	
2	"O Meri Chhammak Chhallo"	Kishore Kumar, Asha Bhosle	
3	"Tera Saath Hai" (Male)	Dr. Kamlesh Avasthi	
4	"Tera Saath Hai" (Female)	Lata Mangeshkar	
5	"Megha Re Megha Re"	Lata Mangeshkar, Suresh Wadkar	Charukesi
6	"In Haseen Wadiyon"	Lata Mangeshkar, Suresh Wadkar	
