= Kanyadaan (1968 film) =

1968 Indian social romantic drama film

- Directed by: Mohan Segal
- Written by: R.A Baqueri
- Produced by: Rajendra Bhatia
- Starring: Shashi Kapoor; Asha Parekh; Om Prakash; Dilip Raj; Padma Rani
- Cinematography: K. H. Kapadia
- Edited by: Pratap Dave
- Music by: Shankar Jaikishan
- Production company: Kiron Productions
- Release date: 1968
- Running time: 149 min
- Country: India
- Language: Hindi
- Box office: ₹3.2 crore (equivalent to ₹180 crore or US$19 million in 2026)

Kanyadaan (transl. Giving Away the Bride) is a 1968 Hindi social romantic drama film directed by Mohan Sehgal. The film was produced by Rajendra Bhatia for Kiron Productions. The story and screenplay was written by R.A Baqueri with dialogue by Sarshar Sailani and director of photography was K. H. Kapadia. The music direction was by Shankar Jaikishan and lyrics by Hasrat Jaipuri and Gopaldas Neeraj. The film stars Shashi Kapoor, Asha Parekh, Om Prakash, Achala Sachdev, Dilip Raj, Sayeeda Khan and Padma Rani.

The plot revolved around the social issue of child marriage. Rekha and Amar are married off as children, they grow up to fall in love with different people and do not accept their child marriage.

== Plot ==
The film starts with a hockey match between the girls' team Bulbuls, and the boys' team Heroes. The girls win by 2 goals to one. Amar (Dileep Raj) from the boys' team and Lata (Sayeeda Khan) from the Bulbul team are attracted to each other. Amar Kumar (Shashi Kapoor) is a poet, and friends with Amar. People often get confused with their names as their names are the same. When Kumar finds out about his friend's love, he takes the initiative to get them married and also promises Lata's father that he would take care of her as she has no in-laws to do so. Kumar, on the way to a town on business has a car breakdown and meets Rekha (Asha Parekh), a village girl. She invites him to stay at their house as he has no other place to go and Kumar accepts it. Both Rekha and Kumar are attracted to each other.

When he starts back, he deliberately stops at her village. Convinced about Rekha's feelings for him, he approaches her mother to ask her hand in marriage. But when Rekha's mother (Achala Sachdev) reveals that Rekha was already married to a guy named Amar in her childhood and even Rekha was oblivious to that till now, he gets shocked. She gives him a photo of the wedding and asks him to help her to find Amar, as she couldn't find out where he lives now. Kumar quietly leaves. Rekha, being a girl who respects traditions to the core, accepts her fate and tries to forget Kumar. But When Kumar returns later with a childhood photo of himself along with his parents and his driving licence stating that his full name is Amar Kumar, she feels very happy and leaves with him as his wife.

However, Kumar later reveals the truth that the original Amar is already married to Lata and she shouldn't disturb their peaceful marital life. He tells her that he loves her very much and asks her to accept the truth and marry him. But Rekha, sad and enraged leaves his house to kill herself, almost getting mowed down by the other Amar's car. Amar and Lata on being told that she has no one and nowhere to go, thinking that her husband may have thrown her out of his house, offer her shelter. When Rekha realizes that this is real Amar and that he is happily married, doesn't reveal the truth. Kumar feels sad and depressed and turns to drinking. Meanwhile, tensions start to build in Amar's house due to the over familiarity of the innocent Rekha in household matters. Later, when Lata finds out about her husband's child- marriage and is furious. Rekha leaves the house with the intention to end her life. But her mother who has come to know of her circumstances and has arrived from the village convinces Rekha that the marriage that has happened in their childhood, without their consent was not a marriage at all, and a real kanyadan (giving away bride in marriage by her parents or guardians) should happen when parents give away their adult daughter with her consent. Rekha at last accepts Kumar as a husband.

== Cast ==
- Shashi Kapoor as Amar Kumar
- Asha Parekh as Rekha
- Om Prakash as Bansi
- Dilip Raj as Amar
- Sayeeda Khan as Lata
- Achala Sachdev as Rekha's mother
- Madhumati
- Sabita Chatterjee
- Laxmi Chhaya
- Sarita Joshi as Rekha's friend Gulabi
- Tun Tun as Bansi's mother-in-law
- Nazir Kashmiri
- Indira Bansal
- Chandrashekhar

== Box-office ==
The film was a box office success, doing a business of ₹3.2 crore, making it the fourth highest earner of 1968.

== Music ==
=== Track list ===
#	Song	Singer	Lyrics
1	"Likhe Jo Khat Tujhe"	Mohammed Rafi	Gopaldas Neeraj
2	"Mil Gaye Mil Gaye Aaj Mere Sanam"	Lata Mangeshkar	
3	"Sunday Ko Pyar Hua, Monday Ko Ikrar Hua"	Asha Bhosle, Mahendra Kapoor	
4	"Parai Hu Parai Meri Aarzu Na Kar"	Lata Mangeshkar	
5	"Phoolo Ki Mahak Lehro Ki Lachak"	Mahendra Kapoor	
6	"Tum Nahi Bhulte Jahan Jayoon"	Mohammed Rafi	
7	"Meri Zindagi Mein Aate"	Mohammed Rafi	

The film's music was composed by Shankar Jaikishan, with lyrics by Hasrat Jaipuri and Neeraj. The singers providing playback were Lata Mangeshkar, Mohammed Rafi, Asha Bhosle and Mahendra Kapoor. The film turned out to be a success with Shankar Jaikishan's music and songs like "Likhe Jo Khat Tujhe" and "Meri Zindagi Mein Aate".
