= Wanted (1961 film) =

1961 Indian film

- Directed by: N. A. Ansari
- Starring: Sayeeda Khan; Vijay Kumar
- Music by: Ravi
- Production company: Golden Films
- Release date: 1961
- Country: India
- Language: Hindi

Wanted is a 1961 Indian Hindi-language film directed by N. A. Ansari, and produced under the banner of Golden Films. The film's music was composed by Ravi. Shot in black-and-white, the cast includes Sayeeda Khan, Vijay Kumar, Helen, N. A. Ansari, Johnny Walker and Manorama.

== Cast ==
- Sayeeda Khan
- Vijay Kumar
- Helen
- N. A. Ansari
- Johnny Walker
- Manorama

== Music ==
The film's music was composed by Ravi.

== Release and reception ==
Wanted was released on 22 December 1961 in the Imperial Theatre of Bombay. The headline of a The Times of India review read, "Golden Films' Wanted Is Wanting In Most Respects".
