= Milan (1967 film) =

- Poster
- Directed by: Adurthi Subba Rao
- Written by: Athreya Mullapudi; Adurthi Subba Rao; Virendra Sinha
- Based on: Mooga Manasulu (1963)
- Produced by: L.V. Prasad
- Starring: Sunil Dutt; Nutan; Pran; Jamuna
- Cinematography: P.L. Raj
- Edited by: Tirunagari. Krishna
- Music by: Laxmikant Pyarelal
- Distributed by: Prasad Studios; Rajshri Productions
- Release date: 17 March 1967
- Running time: 170 minutes
- Country: India
- Languages: Hindi; Bengali

Milan is a 1967 Hindi film directed by Adurthi Subba Rao. It was a remake of his hit Telugu film Mooga Manasulu (1963) and was produced by L. V. Prasad. The film stars Sunil Dutt, Nutan, Jamuna (reprising her role from the original Telugu version), Pran and Deven Varma. The music was composed by the duo Laxmikant Pyarelal.

== Plot ==
The movie starts with the marriage of Radha Devi and Gopinath (Nutan and Sunil Dutt). They start on their honeymoon and have to cross a river on a ferry boat. While they are in the middle of the river, Gopinath suddenly begins to hallucinate about a whirlpool and shouts that they are going to die. Despite Radha and the boatman's reassurances, Gopinath cannot be calmed, so Radha asks the boatman to take them to the nearby bank. Once they reach there, Gopinath starts to say things about Bibiji and a palace that should be there. Radha gets confused and follows him.

They meet with an old man who tells them that Bibiji and Gopi are long dead and their palace is now in ruins. Gopinath asks about Gowri, the shepherd girl. The old man tells them that she is still alive and would come daily to the graves of Gopi and Radha. While they are talking, an old lady comes there and Gopi recognizes her as Gowri. They go to her and she too recognizes them and tells them that they took rebirth to live together in this life. She starts to narrate their story.

Gopi was a poor orphan living with his grandmother in a village on the banks of Ganges. He carries passengers on his boat across the river for a living. Radha was a daughter of a zamindar and studies in the city college. Gopi carries her across the river and gives her a rose every day. Radha finds his innocence lively and maintains a platonic relation with him. He teaches her a song which makes her the winner of singing competition in the college. Gowri (Jamuna), a shepherd girl has feelings for Gopi and always thinks that they are going to marry one day despite Gopi's disinterest for her. Meanwhile, Rambabu (Deven Varma), Radha's classmate gets attracted to her and starts pursuing. He writes a letter to Radha expressing his love. Radha gets angry for that and sends Gopi to teach him a lesson. But her step mother finds that letter and thinks that Radha is also interested in Rambabu. She sends her brother and Radha's uncle (Pran) to settle this matter.

He meets with Rambabu and finds out that he is the heir of a very rich and respectable Roy family and he sincerely wants to marry Radha. He settles their marriage and Radha's parents feel happy about it. Meanwhile, Radha starts to acknowledge her feelings for Gopi and gets shocked to know that her parents settled her marriage with Rambabu. She tries to explain, but her father thinks that she was already in love with Rambabu and there is nothing to discuss. She goes to Gopi and tells him about her betrothal and he receives it passively. He indirectly indicates that whatever their feelings for each other are, class difference wouldn't allow any sort of relation between them. Radha accepts her fate and marries Rambabu and leaves her village.

As fate has different plans, she comes back to her father's house two months later as a widow. Everybody including her parents, uncle, Gopi and Gowri are shocked and feel bad to see her like that. Her father who was already ill, can't bear to see her in that condition and has a massive heart attack and loses his voice. Radha's uncle tries to molest Gowri, but Gopi comes between and saves her. This leads to acrimony between Gopi and him. Gopi continues to meet Radha to console her and to give her courage to live. But Gowri becomes irritated with their relation and fights loudly with Gopi regarding that. This leads to rumors in the village of Radha's affair with Gopi and Radha's mother gets disturbed. Even Radha's in-laws reject to give her share in their property as she was unfaithful to her husband.

At last these rumors reach Radha's ears and she goes to Gopi to talk about them. She gets surprised to see how Gopi made his little hut a temple for her. She realizes that he loved her dearly and asks him to elope with her. Gopi hesitates, but she tells him that she no longer cares about the society who has no sympathy for her. They start crossing the river and her uncle follows them with villagers. Gowri, feeling repentant for spreading rumors, finally agrees to become Radha's uncle's mistress in return for stopping the chase. He agrees and stops the villagers, but a whirlpool takes Radha and Gopi in.

In the present day, Gowri feels happy to see them as a couple and dies in the hands of Gopinath.

== Cast ==
- Sunil Dutt as Gopi/Gopinath
- Nutan as Radha Rai/Radha Devi
- Jamuna as Gouri
- Pran as Rajendra, Radha's uncle
- Deven Varma as Rambabu Rai, Radha's husband
- Surendra as Radha's father
- Shyama as Gauri's step mother
- Leela Mishra as Nani
- Mukri as Jaggu
- David Abraham as College speechmaker (as David)
- Suresh Oberoi as Suresh (Special appearance)

== Soundtrack ==
The lyrics of the film were career-defining for Anand Bakshi and helped take him to the "top", with songs like "Sawan Ka Mahina Pawan Kare Sor", "Ram Kare Aisa Ho Jaaye" and "Bol Gori Bol". Music was composed by the duo Laxmikant–Pyarelal who won their second Filmfare award for best music director for this movie. The playback singers were Lata Mangeshkar, who sang for Nutan and Mukesh, who sang for Sunil Dutt.

#	Title	Singer(s)	Raga
1	"Sawan Ka Mahina"	Mukesh, Lata Mangeshkar	Pahadi
2	"Hum Tum Yug Yug Se (Part 1)"	Mukesh, Lata Mangeshkar	
3	"Bol Gori Bol Tera Kaun Piya"	Mukesh, Lata Mangeshkar	
4	"Aaj Dil Pe Koi"	Lata Mangeshkar	Charukeshi
5	"Hum Tum Yug Yug Se (Part 2)"	Mukesh, Lata Mangeshkar	
6	"Main To Diwana"	Mukesh	
7	"Ram Kare Aisa Ho Jaye"	Mukesh	
8	"Ye Geet Milan Ke"	Mukesh, Lata Mangeshkar	
9	"Bol Gori Bol Tera Kaun Piya"	Mukesh, Lata Mangeshkar	
10	"Aaj Dil Pe Koi Zor Chalta Nahin"	Lata Mangeshkar	Charukeshi
11	"Tohe Sanwariya"	Lata Mangeshkar	

== Awards and nominations ==
15th Filmfare Awards:

Won

- Best Actress – Nutan
- Best Supporting Actress – Jamuna
- Best Music Director – Laxmikant–Pyarelal

Nominated

- Best Film – L. V. Prasad
- Best Director – Adurthi Subba Rao
- Best Actor – Sunil Dutt
- Best Lyricist – Anand Bakshi for "Saawan Ka Mahina"
- Best Male Playback Singer – Mukesh for "Saawan Ka Mahina"
- Best Female Playback Singer – Lata Mangeshkar for "Saawan Ka Mahina"

Other Awards:

- BFJA Awards for Best Actor (Hindi) — Sunil Dutt
- BFJA Award for Best Actress (Hindi) — Nutan
