= Honeymoon (1960 film) =

- Directed by: Lekhraj Bhakri
- Starring: Manoj Kumar; Sayeeda Khan
- Release date: 1960
- Country: India
- Language: Hindi

Honeymoon, also known as Sunehri Raatein, is a 1960 Indian Hindi-language film directed by Lekhraj Bhakri. It is one of the earliest films of Manoj Kumar's acting career. The production of Honeymoon began in early 1959 with Kumar, Sayeeda Khan, and Vijay Chowdhury among its cast. The film was released theatrically in September 1960 and was subsequently reviewed by The Times of India under the title "Jubilee Pictures' Honeymoon A Salute To The Past".
