= Kalaakaar =

- Promotional Poster
- Directed by: P. Sambasiva Rao
- Based on: Payanangal Mudivathillai (Tamil) by R. Sundarrajan
- Produced by: P. Anand Rao
- Starring: Sridevi; Kunal Goswami; Rakesh Bedi; Shreeram Lagoo
- Music by: Kalyanji–Anandji
- Release date: 9 December 1983 (India)
- Country: India
- Language: Hindi

Kalaakaar (transl. Artist) is a 1983 Indian Hindi-language tragedy romantic musical film directed by P. Sambasiva Rao and produced by P. Anand Rao. The film stars Sridevi and Kunal Goswami. It was released in the same year as Himmatwala, Sridevi's breakthrough film in Bollywood, but unlike the former, Kalaakaar was a box office disappointment. It is a remake of the 1982 Tamil Film Payanangal Mudivathillai.

Despite the film's failure, its soundtrack by Kalyanji–Anandji was successful, especially the first track "Neele Neele Ambar Par" sung by Kishore Kumar & Sadhana Sargam. According to music expert Rajesh Subramanian, the guitar piece in the song was played by veteran guitarist Sunil Kaushik. It is a remake of Tamil Song "Ilaya nila pozhigirathe" composed by Ilayaraja for Payanangal Mudivathillai.

== Plot ==
Radha Khanna comes from wealthy family and lives in a palatial house with her widowed father, Rohit. She has a friend Sheela, who also lives in a palatial house, surrounded by some shanty dwellings. One day when Radha goes to Sheela, they witness a young man named Ravikumar singing a song with his guitar. Radha is very impressed with this talented young man, and talks about him with her father. Rohit invites Ravi to sing at the inauguration of a temple, after which Radha invites him to sing live on radio: this is Ravi's first step toward stardom.

Ravi and Radha fall in love with each other and hope to marry soon. Ravi continues to shine with his singing, and is felicitated. At the ceremony, he attributes his success all to himself, much to Radha's disappointment. This is the start of misunderstandings between the young couple, and as a result they stop seeing each other. Unknown to Radha, Ravi has been diagnosed with cancer and does not have long to live, which is why he decided to end things with Radha.

Soon, Ravi learns that Radha is going to marry his doctor, Mohan. Doctor Mohan, unaware of Radha and Ravi's past (but later does), tells Radha about Ravi's terminal illness. Unable to bear that she'll live without Ravi, Radha consumes poison and informs him. Ravi (who is also succumbing to his illness) rushes to Radha's house. After sharing a moment together, Radha and Ravi die beside each other.

== Cast ==
- Sridevi as Radha Khanna
- Kunal Goswami as Ravi Kumar
- Rakesh Bedi as Chander
- Mehmood as Karim Lala
- Madhu Malini as Sheela Mathur
- Paintal as Ravi's neighbour
- Shriram Lagoo as Rohit Khanna
- Krishan Dhawan as Mathur
- Kanwaljit Singh as Doctor Mohan
- Raj Kishore as Mevaram, Mathur's house servant
- Bappi Lahiri as himself
- L. V. Prasad as himself
- Indeevar as himself

== Soundtrack ==
Kalaakaar

Soundtrack album by Kalyanji-Anandji
- Released: 1983
- Length: 28:41
- Label: Sony Music India
- Producer: Kalyanji-Anandji

Kalyanji-Anandji chronology
Ghungroo (1983)	Kalaakaar (1983)	Raaj Tilak (1984)

The music of the film was composed by the duo Kalyanji–Anandji. and the lyrics penned by Indeevar. The track "Neele Neele Ambar Par" is a reuse of the original song "Ilaya Nila" from the Tamil-language film Payanangal Mudivathillai (1982), which was composed by Ilaiyaraaja.

1. "Neele Neele Ambar Par (Male)" - Kishore Kumar
2. "Ho Gori Teri Jawani Pe" - Kishore Kumar
3. "Khoye Khoye Rahe Teri" - Kishore Kumar, Anuradha Paudwal
4. "Deep Jalaye Jo" - Suresh Wadkar
5. "Surajmukhi Mukhda Tera" - Sadhana Sargam, Suresh Wadkar
6. "Mera Pyar Mujhse Rootha" - Anuradha Paudwal, Suresh Wadkar
7. "Main Door Chala Jaoonga" - Suresh Wadkar
8. "Neele Neele Ambar Par (Female)" - Sadhana Sargam

The song "Deep Jalaye Jo" is set in raga Malkauns.
