= Paap Ki Kamaee =

- Film poster
- Directed by: Kawal Sharma
- Written by: Rajeev Kaul
- Produced by: Pawan Arora
- Starring: Mithun Chakraborty; Sangeeta Bijlani; Shilpa Shirodkar; Ektaa Bahl; Prem Chopra
- Cinematography: Damodar Naidu
- Music by: Anu Malik
- Release date: 31 August 1990
- Running time: 160 minutes
- Country: India
- Language: Hindi

Paap Ki Kamaee is a 1990 Indian Hindi-language action crime film directed by Kawal Sharma, starring Mithun Chakraborty (in dual role), Sangeeta Bijlani, Shilpa Shirodkar and Prem Chopra.

== Plot ==
CBI officer Ashwini Kumar was a sincere CBI officer who was leading his life with his sister his lover and his old mother. Now Ashwini Kumar has a secret file and proof of the Yadav and his gang who was a politician and also a criminal behind. To obtain that file that there plans to kills Ashwini Kumr. Salim Khan was a conman leading his life with his lover Salma. Salim Khan wants to take revenge on Deva because his mother was killed by him. Deva who was a lookalike of CBI officer Ashwini Kumar and he was a criminal. One day Salim Khan plans to kill Deva and he mistaken Ashwini Kumar as Deva. The fight begins with Salim Khan and Ashwini Kumar. Salim Khan kills Ashwini Kumar. Now the Yadav and his gang replaces Deva to Ashwini Kumar's place to get that secret file of them which was with Ashwini Kumar, they show his dead body to Deva and Deva disguise as Ashwini Kumar. One day Salim Khan saves a girl from some goons without knowing that she was Ashwini Kumar's sister and goes to her home to drop her and when he sees Ashwini Kumar's photo there, he is frightened. His mother observed to Salim Khan and doubtfully ask him where her son is and why he is surprised to see his photo and when Salim Khan tells truth to his mother Ashwini Kumar's mother that he had killed Ashwini Kumar his mother gets angry at Salim Khan and she tells him that she will never forgive him. One day police call Ashwini Kumar's mother and tell her that Ashwini Kumar is alive and he is safe by replacing Deva and when she meets and Deva on police station she is happy to see him and she is relaxed.

Supremo who was gang leader of Yadav and their gang. He meets Deva to handle that secret file and starts his work with him. Yadav and their people thought that Ashwini Kumar was dead but they learn that Ashwini Kumar is still alive and Supremo already knew that he was not Deva he was Ashwini Kumar. When Salim Khan plans to kill Ashwini Kumar the Yadav and his gang thought that their plan was success but actually that night it was fight between Deva and Ashwini Kumar. Deva tries to kill Ashwini Kumar and when Ashwini Kumar sees Deva's face he is surprised to see his lookalike and Ashwini Kumar immediately eliminates Deva, Salim Khan shoots Ashwini Kumar with duplicate revolver which was exchanged by a police constable Mac, Ashwini Kumar falls down and before Yadav's gang comes near him he as soon as he replaces Deva's dead body and Yadav's gang thinks that it was Ashwini Kumar's body. And after the Deva's death, Ashwini Kumar disguises himself as Deva but Supremo tells everything to Yadav's gang. They kidnap Ashwini Kumar's family and blackmail Ashwini Kumar to give the file to them otherwise we will destroy his family. Salim Khan and Ashwani Kumar together eliminates their gang. Salim Khan seeks his revenge and Ashwini Kumar saves his family and of course the nation also.

== Cast ==
- Mithun Chakraborty as Ashwini Kumar / Deva (Double role)
- Kunal Goswami as Salim Khan
- Sangeeta Bijlani as Seema
- Shilpa Shirodkar as Salma
- Ekta Sohini as Shalu Yadav
- Prem Chopra as Dr. Yadav
- Raza Murad as Minister Sinha
- Gulshan Grover as Chaudhary
- Kulbhushan Kharbanda as Supremo
- Puneet Issar as Paul
- Shafi Inamdar as Abu
- Ajit Vachani as Inspector Khanna
- Amita Nangia as Geeta Ashwini's sister
- Seema Deo as Ashwini's mother
- Dan Dhanoa as Mac
- Tom Alter as John
- Chandrashekhar as Police Commissioner

== Soundtrack ==
Song	Singer
"Dil Ki Lagi Aag"	Shabbir Kumar, Amit Kumar
"O Tera Peechha"	Shabbir Kumar
"Sab Ki Bigdi"	Shabbir Kumar
"Ishq Mein Jaan"	Pankaj Udhas, Anuradha Paudwal
"Humpty Dumpty"	Alka Yagnik, Anu Malik
