= Shaadi (1962 film) =

1962 film by Krishnan–Panju

- Poster
- Directed by: R. Krishnan, S. Panju
- Written by: Rajendra Krishan (dialogue); Jawar N. Sitaraman
- Produced by: Hargobind Duggal
- Starring: Dharmendra; Manoj Kumar; Saira Banu; Balraj Sahni
- Cinematography: S. Maruthi Rao
- Edited by: S. Panjabi
- Music by: Chitragupt
- Release date: 2 November 1962
- Country: India
- Language: Hindi

Shaadi (transl. Marriage) is a 1962 Indian Hindi-language film directed by Krishnan–Panju. The film stars Dharmendra, Manoj Kumar and Saira Banu. It is a remake of the Tamil film Orey Vazhi (1959).

== Plot ==
An elder patriarch, Ratan Malhotra (Balraj Sahni), and his wife Shanti (Sulochana Latkar) have a happy household that consists of his younger brother Ramesh (Dharmendra) and Gauri (Saira Banu). Ramesh marries Kala (Indrani Mukherjee), daughter of a rich, well placed judge. Gauri's marriage is fixed with Raja (Manoj Kumar), the son of a greedy businessman, Daulatram (Om Prakash). However, due to a plane accident in which he lost his memory, Ramesh is unable to reach the wedding in time, with the dowry money making Daulatram walk off immediately after the end of the marriage rituals, with his son in law.

Raja and Gauri meet in Bombay, where Gauri realizes that Raja is her husband and wants to make it big on his own. Ratan and Shanti end up in Bombay in search of Gauri and face an embittered Kala, who blames them for Ramesh's amnesiac state, insults them and throws them out of the house.

Ramesh recovers his memory and returns to his village, only to realize that in his absence, his sister's wedding was called off due to lack of money and his older brother had to sell some of their ancestral property to repay the loan. Holding Kala responsible, he separates and begins to search for his brother.

Raja makes it big as an actor, and his father learns a lesson about importance of relationships over money. Raja, Gauri, Ramesh, Kala, Ratan and Shanti have a reunion. Everyone lives happily ever after.

== Cast ==
- Balraj Sahni...Ratan
- Dharmendra...Ramesh
- Manoj Kumar...Raja
- Saira Banu...Gauri
- Indrani Mukherjee...Kala
- Om Prakash...Seth Daulat Ram
- Sulochana Latkar...Shanti
- Raj Mehra...Judge Motilal
- Manorama...Mrs. Motilal
- Randhir...Manager
- Leela Mishra...Forty Two's Aunt
- Ravikant
- Som Haksar
- Keshav Rana...Loafer
- Kalpana
- Kesri
- Mohan Choti...Forty Two

== Music ==
1. "Aaj Ki Raat Naya Chaand Leke Aayi Hai" - Lata Mangeshkar
2. "Ja Aur Kahi Ro Shehnai Ja Ab Mai Hu Aur Meri Tanhai" - Lata Mangeshkar
3. "Mukhadaa Teraa Saaf Nahin, Jaisaa Kiyaa Hai Tune" - Mohammed Rafi
4. "Chhod De Bedardi Chhod De" - Lata Mangeshkar
5. "Log Toh Baat Ka Afsana Bana Dete Hai" - Mohammed Rafi, Manna Dey
6. "Na Jane Kaha Mera Bachpan" - Lata Mangeshkar
7. "Teri Sharan Pada Hua Data Tu Hi Pita Hai Tu Hi Mata" - Mohammed Rafi
