= Santosh (1989 film) =

- Directed by: Balbir Wadhawan
- Written by: Kaushal Bharati
- Produced by: Balbir Wadhawan
- Starring: Manoj Kumar; Hema Malini; Raakhee; Shatrughan Sinha
- Cinematography: Rajan Kinagi
- Edited by: V.V. Kamat
- Music by: Laxmikant–Pyarelal
- Release date: 1989
- Country: India
- Language: Hindi

Santosh is a 1989 Indian Hindi-language social drama film. The film stars Manoj Kumar, Hema Malini, Raakhee, Shatrughan Sinha in the lead roles, with Nirupa Roy, Prem Chopra, Madan Puri, Amjad Khan in supporting roles.

== Cast ==
- Manoj Kumar as Santosh
- Hema Malini as Kavita
- Raakhee as Rachna
- Shatrughan Sinha as Avinash
- Sarika as Munni
- Kamini Kaushal as Shanti
- Nirupa Roy as Kamla
- Prem Chopra as Kundan
- Madan Puri as Hari
- Amjad Khan as Qaidi No. 333
- Abhi Bhattacharya as Kavita's Father
- Om Shivpuri as Rachna's Father
- Pinchoo Kapoor as Kailashpati
- Praveen Kumar as Kundan's Goon

== Soundtrack ==
1. Yun Lagne Lagi Aajkal Zindgani - Nitin Mukesh & Lata Mangeshkar
2. Kehkahon Ke Liye Hum - Mahendra Kapoor
3. Arre Logon Tumhe Kya Hai - Lata Mangeshkar
4. Aaj Main Bechain Hoon - Mahendra Kapoor

== Trivia ==
The film features the final posthumous role of veteran actor Madan Puri after his death in 1985.
