= Amaanat (1977 film) =

- Directed by: Shatrujit Paul
- Written by: Shatrujit Paul; Z.Hussain
- Produced by: Shatrujit Paul
- Starring: Manoj Kumar; Sadhana; Balraj Sahni; Mehmood; Rehman; Shashikala; Aruna Irani
- Music by: Ravi
- Release date: 1977
- Country: India
- Language: Hindi

Amaanat is a 1977 Indian Hindi-language film directed by Shatrujiit Paul. It stars Manoj Kumar, Sadhana, Balraj Sahni, Mehmood, Rehman, Shashikala, Aruna Irani in pivotal roles. The film took 8 years in making.

== Story ==
Suresh is a painter who lives a contented life with wife, son and his work. One day, a lady asks him to make a portrait of her, for which she will give him Rupees 2,000. He agrees and next day he goes to the lady's house. She seduces him and her husband catches her with Suresh. A fight ensues between the husband and wife with the wife killing the husband. She puts the blame on Suresh. Suresh manages to escape and leaves the place abandoning his wife and child.

While on the train, a man asks Suresh to take care of his wife and baby girl who are travelling alone for first time. Suresh agrees. The train meets with an accident and the lady dies. Suresh takes the baby entrusted in his care and starts looking after her as his daughter.

Suresh's wife has been left to fend for herself and her son. She starts working as a maid to earn a livelihood. Her employer offers to adopt the son and provide him with an education and clothes to wear and food to eat. She agrees to leave her son in his care so as to give him a good life.

Several years pass and Deepak falls in love with Suresh's adopted daughter Suchitra. After several eventful incidents in their lives, Deepak gets his love Suchitra, and Suresh gets justice and is reunited with his wife and son.

== Cast ==
- Manoj Kumar as Deepak
- Sadhana as Suchitra
- Balraj Sahni as Suresh
- Mehmood as Mahesh
- Rehman as Amar
- Shashikala as Sonia
- Aruna Irani as Flora D'Costa
- Achala Sachdev as Shanti
- Mukri as Lobo
- Asit Sen as Mr. D'Costa
- Dheeraj Kumar as Mohan
- Krishan Dhawan as Ramakant, Mohan's father
- Praveen Paul as Tanuja, Mohan's mother
- Brahm Bhardwaj as Bhagat, Mohan's grandpa

== Soundtrack ==
The music of the film was composed by Ravi and penned by Sahir Ludhianvi. Mohammed Rafi sang the most memorable songs: "Door Rehkar Na Karo Baat Kareeb Aa Jao", "Matlab Nikal Gaya To Pehchante Nahin" and "Teri Jawani Tapta Mahina".

Song	Singer
"Har Ek Dil Mein Koi"	Mohammed Rafi
"Matlab Nikal Gaya"	Mohammed Rafi
"Door Rehkar"	Mohammed Rafi
"Teri Jawani"	Mohammed Rafi
"Cycle Pe Haseenon Ki Toli"	Mohammed Rafi, Manna Dey, Asha Bhosle
"Bujhe Bujhe Rang"	Asha Bhosle
"Bhus Bhar Diya"	Manna Dey
