= Chand (film) =

1959 film by Lekhraj Bhakri

- Directed by: Lekhraj Bhakri
- Written by: Lekhraj Bhakri
- Produced by: Kuldeep Sehgal
- Starring: Meena Kumari; Balraj Sahni; Pandari Bai
- Edited by: Lachhmann Das
- Music by: Hemant Kumar
- Release date: 1959
- Running time: 140 mins
- Language: Hindi

Chand (transl. The Heir) is a 1959 Indian Hindi-language film starring Meena Kumari, Balraj Sahni, Pandari Bai and Manoj Kumar in lead roles. The film is directed by Lekhraj Bhakri and its music is given by Hemant Kumar.

== Plot ==
Although the film was released in 1959, its story is set in the early 1950s before the introduction of The Hindu Marriage Act, 1955 which opposes polygamy.

Mr. Kapoor (Balraj Sahni), a rich and successful man, is happily married to his wife Kamla (Pandari Bai). The only grief in their lives is the absence of a legal heir as Kamla is unable to conceive.

Vimla (Meena Kumari) is happy-go-lucky chirpy woman who's in love with Gokul (Manoj Kumar) but due to his scheming father who also works as a Munshi (accountant) (Sajjan) at the Kapoors', she is married to Mr. Kapoor in lieu of money.

The Kapoors find Vimla as their only option to bear a child while Vimla blames her father (M. Kumar) for her fate, unknown to the fact that it was actually the Munshi who did it. Vimla soon realises that it is only the child which matters for the Kapoors and soon leave their house. Back at home, Vimla, now in depression, pledges to get back her child via legal route but she again loses to the Kapoors and is sent to a mental asylum. On the other hand, the Kapoors are also worried about Vimla's condition as they personally don't have any problems with her.

In the climax of the film, Vimla flees from the asylum in order to end her life but at the nick of the moment is saved by the Kapoors'. The film ends on a happy note when Vimla realises their true intentions and the three of them live happily ever after.

== Cast ==
- Balraj Sahni as Mr. Kapoor
- Pandari Bai as Kamla
- Meena Kumari as Vimla
- Manoj Kumar as Gokul
- M. Kumar as Vimla's father
- Achala Sachdev as Ganga
- Daisy Irani as Ganga's son
- Leela Mishra as Sharbati, the maid
- Sunder as Sharbati's husband
- Sajjan as Munshi
- Helen as Dancer
- Kumari Naaz (guest appearance)

== Crew ==
- Director – Lekhraj Bhakri
- Producer – Kuldeep Sehgal
- Story – Lekhraj Bhakri
- Photography – Ranjodh Thakur
- Music – Hemant Kumar
- Lyrics – Shailendra, Bharat Vyas, Akhtar Lakhnawi
- Editing – Lachhmann Das
- Art Direction – Desh Mukherji
- Playback Singers – Lata Mangeshkar, Suman Kalyanpur, Ranganath Jadhav

== Soundtrack ==
The film had six songs in it. The music of the film was composed by Hemant Kumar. Shailendra, Bharat Vyas and Akhtar Lakhnawi wrote the lyrics.

1. "Aye Baadalon" - Lata Mangeshkar. Lyrics by: Bharat Vyas
2. "Galat Hai Lut Liyaa Tumko Husn Vaalon Ne" - Ranganath Jadhav. Lyrics by: Akhtar Lakhnawi
3. "Kabhi Aaj Kabhi Kal" - Lata Mangeshkar, Suman Kalyanpur. Lyrics by: Shailendra
4. "Khoyi Khoyi Akhiyan" - Lata Mangeshkar. Lyrics by: Shailendra
5. "Aa Jaa Ri Chandani" - Lata Mangeshkar. Lyrics by: Shailendra
6. "Muskurao Laadle Door Ho Andhera" - Lata Mangeshkar. Lyrics by: Shailendra
