= Yaadgaar (1970 film) =

Yaadgar
- Theatrical poster
- Directed by: S Ram Sharma
- Produced by: S Ram Sharma
- Starring: Manoj Kumar; Nutan; Pran
- Music by: Kalyanji Anandji
- Release date: 4 July 1970
- Country: India
- Language: Hindi

Yaadgar is a 1970 Hindi film produced and directed by S. Ram Sharma. The film stars Manoj Kumar, Nutan, Pran, Prem Chopra, Madan Puri, Kamini Kaushal and Rajnath as a villager. The music is by Kalyanji Anandji. This film has some very memorable songs.

== Cast ==
- Manoj Kumar
- Nutan
- Pran
- Prem Chopra
- Madan Puri
- Kamini Kaushal
- Rajnath

== Soundtrack ==
#	Title	Singer(s)	Lyricist(s)
1	"Ek Tara Bole"	Mahendra Kapoor	Verma Malik
2	"Jis Path Pe Chala"	Lata Mangeshkar	Indeevar
3	"Woh Khet Mein Milega"	Mahendra Kapoor	Indeevar
4	"Boli Sawan Ki Raat"	Manhar Udhas, Mahendra Kapoor, Nutan	Verma Malik
5	"Baharon Ka Hai Mela"	Asha Bhosle	Indeevar
