= Kalyug Aur Ramayan =

- Ultra CD Cover
- Directed by: Babubhai Mistri
- Story by: Manoj Kumar(written by); Dawood Kashmiri (dialogue)
- Produced by: Shashi Goswami
- Starring: Manoj Kumar; Madhavi; Rajiv Goswami; Prem Chopra; Om Prakash; Bindu; Satish Shah; Sonika Gill; Abhi Bhattacharya; Huma Khan; Urmila Bhatt; Parikshat Sahni
- Cinematography: V.K. Murthy
- Edited by: Manoj Kumar
- Music by: Kalyanji Anandji
- Release date: 24 April 1987
- Country: India
- Language: Hindi

Kalyug Aur Ramayan (lit. 'Kaliyuga and Ramayana') is a 1987 Indian Hindi-language drama film starring Manoj Kumar, Madhavi, Prem Chopra, Om Prakash, Bindu and Rajiv Goswami. The film, a modern adaptation of the ancient Indian epic Ramayana, was directed by Babubhai Mistri and produced by Shashi Goswami. The music was given by Kalyanji Anandji and lyrics by Maya Govind and Verma Malik.

The film faced controversy, particularly from Hindutva (Hindu nationalist) groups like the Vishwa Hindu Parishad, on objections to the juxtaposition of Kaliyuga (the current Dark Age in Hinduism) with the religious text Ramayana in the title and the portrayal of deities from the latter who are situated in a contemporary debauched India. Originally titled Kalyug Ki Ramayan (lit. 'Ramayana of the Kaliyuga') the title was changed as mandated by the Central Board of Film Certification along with other edits to address religious concerns.

== Plot ==
The film is based on the ancient Indian epic Ramayana and set in the modern-day India. Manoj Kumar portrays the god Hanuman, the devotee of Rama, who comes to earth on the latter's instructions and meets a miserable father Dasaratha (named after Rama's father in the epic, other members of the family are similarly named). Dasrath is distressed by his sons and daughter-in-law. How Hanuman solves this problem is theme of the film.

== Cast ==
- Manoj Kumar as Pawan Putra / Hanumana
- Rajiv Goswami as Raman (based on Rama)
- Madhavi as Sarita (based on Sita)
- Prem Chopra as Bhairon Singh
- Om Prakash as Dashrath (based on Dasaratha)
- Bindu as Kamla (based on Kaushalya)
- Satish Shah as Police Inspector Thakur Hanuman Singh
- Parikshat Sahni as Judge Shyam Diwakar
- Huma Khan as Kamini
- Urmila Bhatt as Mrs. Sharma
- Abhi Bhattacharya as Mr. Sharma
- Birbal as D'Souza
- Mohan Choti as Stage Actor
- C.S. Dubey as Jagannath
- Amrit Patel as Stage Actor
- Sarita Devi as Dashrath's Mother
- Bhupendra Singh
- Dinesh Kaushik as Stage actor
- Sonika Gill as Nirmala Sharma
- Rahul as Dhaman
- Manmauji as Stage actor

== Soundtrack ==
All music is composed by Kalyanji Anandji.

No.	Title	Lyrics	Singer(s)	Length
1.	"Chalo Bhagg Chalen"	Maya Govind	Lata Mangeshkar
2.	"Dekh Ke In Besharmon Ko"	Manoj Kumar	Mahendra Kapoor
3.	"Kya Kya Na Sitam"	Maya Govind	Asha Bhosle, Vishal Goswami
4.	"Yug Yug Tak Dukh Saha"	Verma Malik	Sadhana Sargam
5.	"Shri Ram Jai Ram"	Verma Malik	Mahendra Kapoor
6.	"Yahan Lukhta Yahan Mukhta"	Verma Malik	Mahendra Kapoor, Asha Bhosle
7.	"Shri Ramchandra Krupalu Bhajman"	Verma Malik	Nitin Mukesh
8.	"Hanuman Chalisa"	Tulsidas	Mahendra Kapoor

== See also ==
- Hindutva boycott of Bollywood films
