= Kranti =

- Kranti movie poster
- Directed by: Manoj Kumar
- Written by: Story & Screenplay: Salim–Javed; Dialogues: Manoj Kumar
- Produced by: Manoj Kumar
- Starring: Dilip Kumar; Manoj Kumar; Shashi Kapoor; Shatrughan Sinha; Hema Malini; Parveen Babi; Prem Chopra
- Cinematography: Joe D'Souza
- Edited by: Manoj Kumar
- Music by: Laxmikant–Pyarelal
- Release date: 6 February 1981
- Running time: 179 minutes
- Country: India
- Language: Hindi

Kranti (transl. Revolution) is a 1981 Indian historical drama film, produced, edited, dialogue and directed by Manoj Kumar, with the story and screenplay written by Salim–Javed. It stars an ensemble cast, consisting of Dilip Kumar in the title role along with Manoj Kumar, Shashi Kapoor, Shatrughan Sinha, Hema Malini, Parveen Babi, Prem Chopra in pivotal roles. The film also marked the return of Dilip Kumar after a four-year hiatus. It ranks among the top 10 highest grossing Indian films of all time, when adjusted for ticket-price inflation. It was one of the most expensive Indian films of the time and it went on to become the highest grossing Indian film of the 1980s decade by a distance, when adjusted for inflation.

At the time of release it was the fastest earner of all time setting first run records in practically all circuits barring Mumbai and South. It celebrated a silver jubilee in 26 centres and even in places like Mirzapur (UP) and Junagadh (Gujarat) where jubilees were very rare. There are hardly ten films in history that are estimated to have celebrated jubilees in over 25 centres. The craze of the film was such that in places like Delhi, Rajasthan, UP and Haryana there were shops selling Kranti T-shirts, jackets, vests and even underwear. This film celebrated golden jubilee in many centres across India. It ran for 67 weeks straight in the theatres including a theatre where it was housefull for 96 days.

The collections in all major centres of UP did not see a drop even weeks after its release. The collections after ten weeks in places like Agra, Gorakhpur and Varanasi were still competing with new releases. Kranti grossed 1.25 crore nett in Delhi / UP in ten weeks and then went on to do over 3 crore nett in its full run and before Hum Aapke Hain Kaun..! released in 1994 (marking major changes in business of films), there were only three films in history to cross 3 crore nett in Delhi / UP. The film was finally declared a Golden Jubilee Hit. Kranti is widely regarded as a cult film.

== Synopsis ==
The film takes place in 19th-century British India and is the story of the fight for independence from the British between 1825 and 1875. The film tells the story of men that lead the struggle against British Rule: Sanga, Bharat known as Kranti, a prince and a freedom fighter. Sanga is an honest and dedicated employee in the kingdom of Ramgarh, owing allegiance and loyalty to no one except Raja Laxman Singh. When Laxman Singh conditionally permits the British to use the port for trading purposes, Sangha finds out that the British are taking out gold and jewellery and bringing in ammunition, and puts a stop to this. He goes to report this outrage to Laxman Singh, only to find him stabbed to death. Sanga is charged with treason and of killing Laxman Singh. Sentenced to death, he escapes and forms a group of revolutionaries who have only one goal - to drive the British out of India. This group multiplies into several armies, all united with one slogan - an Independent India, also known as Kranti.

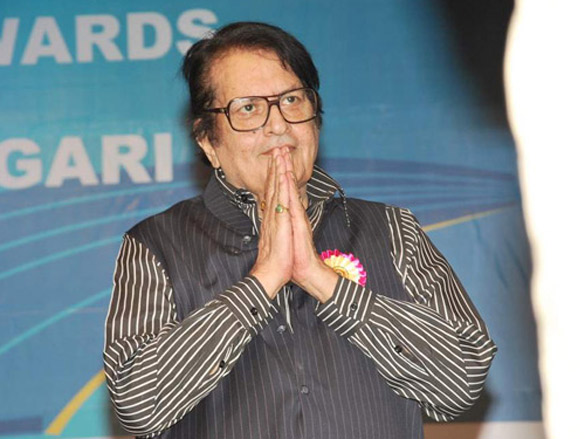

== Cast ==
- Dilip Kumar as Sanga
- Manoj Kumar as Bharat
- Shashi Kapoor as Shakti
- Shatrughan Sinha as Karim Khan
- Hema Malini as Rajkumari Meenakshi
- Parveen Babi as Sureeli
- Nirupa Roy as Radha
- Pradeep Kumar as Shamsher Singh
- Prem Chopra as Shambhu Singh
- Kishore Kapoor as Sir Thomas
- Madan Puri as Sher Singh
- Shashikala as Rani Charumati
- Sulochana Latkar as Rama, Servant of Rani Charumati
- Preeti Ganguly as Sureeli's Friend
- Sarika as Sheetal
- Sudhir Dalvi as Bheema
- Kunal Goswami as Bharat & Meenakshi's Son
- Agha as Sanga's Kranti Group Member
- Birbal as Sanga's Kranti Group Member
- Paintal as Bharat's Kranti Group Member
- Bhagwan as Allah Rakha
- Manmohan as Darmiyan Singh
- Tom Alter as British Officer
- P. Jairaj as Maharaj Laxman Singh
- Dheeraj Kumar as Prince
- Gurbachan Singh as British Indian Soldier

== Soundtrack ==
The music is scored by Laxmikant Pyarelal and the lyrics are written by Manoj Kumar and Santosh Anand. The music was popular with some hit songs like "Zindagi Ki Na Toote Ladi" and "Chana Jor Garam". Laxmikant Pyarelal used famous singers Kishore Kumar, Lata Mangeshkar, Mohammed Rafi, Manna Dey, Mahendra Kapoor, Shailender Singh and Nitin Mukesh to sing for the actors.

No.	Title	Singer(s)	Length
1.	"Lui Shamasha"	Lata Mangeshkar, Nitin Mukesh	07:46
2.	"Ab Ke Baras"	Mahendra Kapoor	06:32
3.	"Chana Jor Garam"	Kishore Kumar, Lata Mangeshkar, Nitin Mukesh, Mohammed Rafi	07:08
4.	"Durga Hai Meri Maa"	Mahendra Kapoor, Minoo Purshottam	03:58
5.	"Zindagi Ki Na Toote Ladi"	Lata Mangeshkar, Nitin Mukesh	07:03
6.	"Mara Thumka"	Lata Mangeshkar	04:56
7.	"Kranti Kranti (Part 1)"	Lata Mangeshkar, Manna Dey, Mahendra Kapoor, Nitin Mukesh, Shailendra Singh	03:01
8.	"Kranti Kranti (Part 2)"	Lata Mangeshkar, Manna Dey, Mahendra Kapoor, Nitin Mukesh, Shailendra Singh	03:16
Total length:			43:40

== Additional information ==
During the making of Kranti in November 1977 at Rajkamal Kalamandir Studios, Bombay, a sudden cloudburst caused a wall to collapse on cinematographer and producer Nariman Irani. He was seriously injured, hospitalized, and died a few days later.

== See also ==
- Anand Math (1952)
- Naya Daur (1957)
- Saat Hindustani (1969)
- Pukar (1983)
- Lagaan (2001)
