= Deshwasi =

- Directed by: Rajiv Goswami
- Produced by: Rajiv Goswami
- Starring: Manoj Kumar; Hema Malini; Poonam Dhillon; Mandakini
- Music by: Laxmikant-Pyarelal
- Production company: V.I.P. Films Combines
- Release date: 5 April 1991
- Country: India
- Language: Hindi

Deshwasi is a 1991 Bollywood drama film directed by Rajiv Goswami and released under the banner of V.I.P. Films Combines. It stars Manoj Kumar, Hema Malini, Poonam Dhillon, Mandakini, Satish Shah, Anupam Kher, Om Shivpuri.

== Story ==
Unhappy with India's independence from the British, Raja Shamsher Singh and his goons initially attempt to put their candidate, Shishupal, up for elections.

== Cast ==
- Manoj Kumar as Sangram Singh
- Hema Malini as Bharati Singh
- Rajiv Goswami as Shakti Singh
- Poonam Dhillon as Raksha
- Mandakini as Maryada
- Suresh Oberoi as Pratap Singh
- Satish Shah as Shishupal
- Anupam Kher as Raja Shamsher Singh
- Om Shivpuri as Thakur Shivpal Singh
- Bharat Kapoor as Swami Satyanand
- Mahesh Bhatt as Collector
- Kamini Kaushal as Mrs. Singh
- Tom Alter

== Soundtrack ==
The film's music was composed by Laxmikant Pyarelal, with lyrics by Anand Bakshi.

#	Song title	Singer(s)
1	"Saawan Ka Mahina Pawan Kar Shor"	Anuradha Paudwal
2	"Jivan Ek Sangraam Hai, Subah Savere Sabase Pahale"	Anuradha Paudwal; Nitin Mukesh
3	"Kal Kisne Dekha Kal Aaye Naa Aaye"	Anuradha Paudwal; Nitin Mukesh
4	"Tere Liye Mai Bana Hu"	Anuradha Paudwal; Nitin Mukesh
5	"Mere Deshwashao"	Anuradha Paudwal; Nitin Mukesh
6	"Barason Ke Baad Uthi, Aaj Holi Hai"	Anuradha Paudwal; Kavita Krishnamurthy; Nitin Mukesh
