= Upkar =

- Directed by: Manoj Kumar
- Written by: Manoj Kumar
- Produced by: Harkishen R. Mirchandani; R. N. Goswami
- Starring: Manoj Kumar; Asha Parekh; Prem Chopra; Pran
- Cinematography: V. N. Reddy
- Edited by: B. S. Glaad
- Music by: Kalyanji Anandji
- Production company: Vishal Pictures
- Distributed by: Vishal Pictures
- Release date: 11 August 1967
- Running time: 175 minutes
- Country: India
- Language: Hindi
- Box office: 7 Crore

Upkar (transl. Favour) is a 1967 Indian Hindi film directed by Manoj Kumar. Set in the backdrop of the Indo-Pakistani War of 1965, Upkar celebrates village life and the contributions of farmers and soldiers to India. The film was inspired by Indian prime minister, Lal Bahadur Shastri, who suggested that Kumar make a film based on his motto for India, "Jai Jawan Jai Kisan" (transl. Hail the Soldier, Hail the Farmer). It stars Kumar, Prem Chopra, Asha Parekh, Kamini Kaushal, Pran, and Madan Puri.

It was Kumar's directorial debut film. The film held the top spot at the box office in 1967 and was the highest-grossing Indian film of the year. Upkar won seven Filmfare Awards including Best Film. It also won the National Film Award for Second Best Feature Film.

The film was remade in Telugu as Padipantalu in 1976.

== Plot ==
A village man from Atali village (Ballabgarh, Haryana), Bharat, sacrifices everything for his brother's education. The brother, Puran, goes to study in the city and becomes attracted to the high-society lifestyle. When Puran returns to the village, he is a selfish man and wants to sell his share of the family's property. Bharat is unwilling to divide the property and transfers the disputed land to Puran's son.

When the Indo-Pakistani War of 1965 begins, Bharat joins the fight. With the help of his greedy uncle Charandas and some partners, Puran tries to profit by hoarding and selling grains on the black market. Puran eventually discovers Charandas' plan to separate the two brothers. Ridden with guilt and shame, Puran surrenders to the police.

Bharat fights bravely in the war but is captured by the enemy. He escapes but is badly injured and loses both hands. When Bharat returns home as a war hero, Puran apologizes to him. Reunited in the village, the two brothers farm the family fields together.

== Cast ==
- Manoj Kumar – Bharat
  - Mahesh Kothare – Younger Bharat
- Asha Parekh – Dr. Kavita
- Prem Chopra – Puran "Kumar"
- Kanhaiyalal – Lala Dhaniram
- Pran – Malang Chacha
- David – Major saab
- Kamini Kaushal – Radha
- Asit Sen – Lakhpati
- Tun Tun – Lakhpati's Wife
- Madan Puri – Charan Das
- Manmohan – Kavita's Brother
- Aruna Irani – Kamli
- Manmohan Krishan – Bisna
- Sunder – Sunder
- Gulshan Bawra – Som
- Mohan Choti – Mangal
- Laxmi Chhaya – Guest dancer in "Gulabi Raat Gulabi"

== Production ==
According to an interview with Manoj Kumar, Rajesh Khanna was originally signed in a supporting role for the film. However, he won the All India Talent Contest and had to withdraw from the film. Prem Chopra replaced him.

Some portions of Upkar were filmed at Rajkamal Kalamandir, Kamal Studio, Guru Dutt Films, and Mehboob Studio. However, the principal photography took place in the village of Nangal Thakran in Delhi & Atali Village (Ballabgarh, Haryana). The film unit borrowed bullock carts and plows from the Garhkhera villagers (near Atali Village) for filming. Bharat's house and field were actual locations in Nangal Thakran & Atali Village, including the field where the "Mere Desh Ki Dharti" song was filmed. The cast and production stayed in Delhi while filming in Nangal Thakran, traveling to the village each morning. However, they stayed in Nangal Thakran during the filming of night sequences.

== Soundtrack ==
The film was scored by Kalyanji Anandji. Qamar Jalalabadi, Indeevar, Gulshan Bawra, and Prem Dhawan wrote the lyrics for the songs. The patriotic song "Mere Desh Ki Dharti" (transl. Land of my country) has become a staple of Republic Day and Independence Day celebrations in India.

No.	Title	Lyrics	Singer(s)
1	"Deewanon Se Ye Mat Poocho"	Qamar Jalalabadi	Mukesh
2	"Kasme Waade Pyar Wafa"	Indeevar	Manna Dey
3	"Mere Desh Ki Dharti"	Gulshan Bawra	Mahendra Kapoor
4	"Aayi Jhoomke Basant"	Prem Dhawan	Asha Bhosle, Shamshad Begum, Mahendra Kapoor & Manna Dey
5	"Gulabi Raat Gulabi"	Indeevar	Asha Bhosle
6	"Har Khushi Ho Wahan"	Gulshan Bawra	Lata Mangeshkar
7	"Yeh Kali Raat Kali"	Indeevar	Mohd. Rafi

== Awards and nominations ==
=== 15th Filmfare Awards ===
==== Won ====
- Best Film – V. I. P. Films
- Best Director – Manoj Kumar
- Best Supporting Actor – Pran
- Best Lyricist – Gulshan Bawra for "Mere Desh Ki Dharti"
- Best Story – Manoj Kumar
- Best Dialogue – Manoj Kumar
- Best Editing – B. S. Glaad

==== Nominated ====
- Best Actor – Manoj Kumar
- Best Music Director – Kalyanji–Anandji
- Best Male Playback Singer – Mahendra Kapoor for "Mere Desh Ki Dharti"

=== Other awards ===
- National Film Award for Second Best Feature Film—Manoj Kumar
- National Film Award for Best Male Playback Singer – Mahendra Kapoor for the song "Mere Desh Ki Dharti"
- BFJA Award for Best Dialogue (Hindi) – Manoj Kumar
