= Nangal Thakran =

In Delhi, India

- Delhi
- Location in India
- Coordinates: 28.79574°N 77.01246°E
- Country: India
- State: Delhi
- District: North West

Population (2001)
  - Total: 3,558

Languages
  - Official: Hindi, English
  - MotherTongue: Haryanvi
- Time zone: UTC+5:30 (IST)
- Postal code: 110039

Nangal Thakran is a census town in Narela Block in the Indian state of Delhi.

In Delhi’s Nangal Thakran, the village where the 1967 film Upkar was shot, villagers remember meeting the film's stars, while they continue to face agricultural difficulties.

== Demographics & History ==
As of 2001 India census, Nangal Thakran had a population of 3558. Males constitute 54% of the population and females 46%. In Nangal Thakran, 94% of the population is under 60 years of age. The total geographical area of village is 534 hectares. There are about 722 houses in Nangal Thakran village. Bawana is nearest town to Nangal Thakran which is approximately 5 km away.

In Nangal Thakran, most of the population is of Jats. Thakran is the gotra of Jats in this village and this village was founded by Thakran Jats. They are a dominant farming community who own their land.

The village produces wheat, rice, sugarcane and other agricultural produce, which is sold in local markets in Delhi. Most households earn their main income from agriculture, and some have jobs in the private and public sectors.
