= Aadmi (1968 film) =

1968 Indian Hindi film

- Directed by: A. Bhimsingh
- Written by: Akhtar ul Iman; Kaushal Bharati; Ramarao; Shamanna
- Story by: Jawar N. Sitaraman
- Based on: Aalayamani by K. Shankar
- Produced by: P. S. Veerappa
- Starring: Dilip Kumar; Waheeda Rehman; Manoj Kumar; Simi Garewal; Pran
- Cinematography: Faredoon A. Irani
- Edited by: A. Paul Doraisingam
- Music by: Naushad
- Release date: 1968
- Country: India
- Language: Hindi

Aadmi is a 1968 Indian Hindi drama film produced by P. S. Veerappa and directed by A. Bhimsingh. The film stars Dilip Kumar, Waheeda Rehman, Manoj Kumar, Simi Garewal and Pran. The film's music is by Naushad. The film is a remake of the Tamil film Aalayamani. Besides being noted for Dilip Kumar's acting as a man in a wheelchair, the film is also known for its dialogues by Akhtar ul Iman and trick cinematography work by Faredoon A. Irani. It was a commercial success at the box office.

== Cast ==
- Dilip Kumar as Rajesh / Raja Sahib
- Waheeda Rehman as Meena
- Manoj Kumar as Dr. Shekhar
- Simi Garewal as Dr. Aarti
- Pran as Mayadas
- Agha as Prem
- Mohan Choti as Hari
- Shivraj as Girdharilal
- Ulhas as Govind
- Padma Chavan as Parvati
- Sulochana Latkar as Shekhar's Mother

== Music ==
Lyrics : Shakeel Badayuni Composer : Naushad

| Song | Singer |
|---|---|
| "Aaj Purani Rahon Se Koi" | Mohammed Rafi |
| "Na Aadmi Ka Koi Bharosa" | Mohammed Rafi |
| "Main Tooti Hui Ek Naiya Hoon" | Mohammed Rafi |
| "Kaisi Haseen Aaj Baharon Ki Raat Hai" | Mohammed Rafi, Mahendra Kapoor |
| "Kal Ke Sapne Aaj Bhi Aana" | Lata Mangeshkar |
| "Kari Badariya Mare Nazariya" | Lata Mangeshkar |

The song "Aaj Purani Rahon Se Koi" is set in the Hindustani raga Bhimpalasi.
