= Shor (film) =

- Directed by: Manoj Kumar
- Written by: Manoj Kumar
- Produced by: Manoj Kumar; Shashi Goswami
- Starring: Manoj Kumar; Jaya Bhaduri; Nanda
- Cinematography: Nariman Irani
- Edited by: Manoj Kumar
- Music by: Laxmikant Pyarelal
- Release date: 22 September 1972
- Country: India
- Language: Hindi

Shor (Translation: Hubbub) is a 1972 Indian Hindi tragedy film written, produced and directed by Manoj Kumar, who also plays the lead role in the film. The film was remade in Tamil as Osai.

== Plot ==
Shankar loses his wife in an accident. She dies while saving her son. Due to the accident, Deepak loses his voice. Shankar is keen to hear his son's voice again; however, doctors suggest that Deepak has to undergo surgery to get his voice back. Shankar tries hard to collect money for the surgery and finally is able to collect enough money for the surgery after a few hardships. Deepak undergoes the surgery successfully. Shankar is keen to meet Deepak; however, the doctor advises him to meet Deepak the next day so as not to overexert the patient. Shankar goes to work; however, he is unable to focus properly while working with machines and eventually gets injured. The injury causes him to lose his hearing. The father is now unable to hear his son's voice when he regains it.

== Cast ==
- Manoj Kumar as Shankar
- Jaya Bhaduri as Raat Ki Rani / Rani - Shankar's well-wisher and in love with Shankar
- Prem Nath as Khan Badshah - Rani's father
- Nanda as Geeta - Shankar's wife (special appearance)
- Kamini Kaushal as Shankar's mom
- Madan Puri as Factory Owner
- Asrani as Shantilal
- Master Satyajeet as Deepak - Shankar and Geeta's Son
- Manorama as Victoria - Shanta's mom
- Meena T. as Shanta
- Shefali
- Leena
- Manmohan as Kabrastan Ke Raja
- Raj Mehra as Doctor
- Nana Palsikar
- Krishan Dhawan
- Kuljeet
- V. Gopal as Mr. Moradabadi

== Soundtrack ==
The popular music of this movie is composed by the duo Laxmikant Pyarelal, is most noted for the memorable song "Ek Pyar Ka Nagma" (एक प्यार का नग्मा है, मौजो की रवानी है). The song was penned by Santosh Anand.

No.	Title	Singer(s)	Lyricist(s)
1.	Ek Pyar Ka Nagma Hai	Lata Mangeshkar, Mukesh	Santosh Anand
2.	Ek Pyar Ka Nagma Hai - Part 2	Mukesh	
3.	Jeevan Chalne Ka Naam	Manna Dey, Mahendra Kapoor, Shyama Chittar	Rajkavi Inderjeet Singh Tulsi
4.	Macha Diya Shor	Lata Mangeshkar	
5.	Paani Re Paani	Mukesh, Lata Mangeshkar	Rajkavi Inderjeet Singh Tulsi
6.	Shehnai Baje Na Baje	Lata Mangeshkar	

== Awards ==
20th Filmfare Awards:

Won

- Best Editing – Manoj Kumar

Nominated

- Best Director – Manoj Kumar
- Best Supporting Actor – Prem Nath
- Best Music Director – Laxmikant–Pyarelal
- Best Lyricist – Santosh Anand for "Ek Pyaar Ka Nagma Hai"
- Best Male Playback Singer – Mukesh for "Ek Pyaar Ka Nagma Hai"
- 'Best Story – Manoj Kumar
