= Be-Imaan =

1972 film by Sohanlal Kanwar

- Poster
- Directed by: Sohanlal Kanwar
- Written by: Ved Rahi
- Screenplay by: Ram Kelkar
- Story by: Sachin Bhowmick
- Produced by: Sohanlal Kanwar
- Starring: Manoj Kumar; Raakhee; Pran; Prem Chopra; Premnath; Nazima
- Cinematography: Radhu Karmakar
- Edited by: Nand Kumar
- Music by: Shankar Jaikishan
- Production company: Filmnagar
- Distributed by: Filmnagar
- Release date: 15 December 1972
- Running time: 147 mins
- Country: India
- Language: Hindi

Be-Imaan (lit. 'Dishonest') is a 1972 Hindi-language film directed by Sohanlal Kanwar. The film stars Manoj Kumar, Raakhee, Premnath, Pran, Prem Chopra and Tun Tun. This film won 7 Filmfare Awards including best movie, best director and best actor.

The music is by Shankar Jaikishan. The film was remade in Tamil as En Magan with Sivaji Ganesan.

== Awards ==
Won

- Best Film – Sohanlal Kanwar
- Best Director – Sohanlal Kanwar
- Best Actor – Manoj Kumar
- Best Supporting Actor – Pran
- Best Music Director – Shankar Jaikishan
- Best Lyricist – Verma Malik
- Best Male Playback Singer – Mukesh

Nominated

- Best Supporting Actress – Nazima

== Cast ==
- Manoj Kumar as Mohan / Shyam
- Raakhee as Sapna
- Pran as Constable Ram Singh
- Prem Chopra as Deepak Das
- Nazima as Meena
- Premnath as D. I. G. Gopal Das
- Sulochana Latkar as Mrs. Gopal Das
- Raj Mehra as Seth Jamna Das
- Snehlata as Kamini
- Rajpal

== Soundtrack ==
All lyrics were written by Verma Malik and music was composed by Shankar Jaikishan.

#	Title	Singer(s)	Raga
1	"Hum Do Mast Malang"	Kishore Kumar, Mahendra Kapoor	
2	"Patla Patla Reshmi Roomal"	Mahendra Kapoor, Asha Bhosle	
3	"Jai Bolo Be-Imaan Ki"	Mukesh	Bhairavi
4	"Dekhoji Raat Ko Julam Ho Gaya"	Asha Bhosle	
5	"Yeh Raakhi Bandhan Hai Aisa"	Mukesh, Lata Mangeshkar	
6	"Ek Ek Ginwata Hoon"	Mukesh	
7	"Main To Chali Hoon Wahan"	Sharda, Asha Bhosle	

== Reception ==
20th Filmfare Awards:

Won

- Filmfare Best Movie Award
- Filmfare Best Actor Award for Manoj Kumar
- Filmfare Best Director Award for Sohanlal Kanwar
- Filmfare Best Music Director Award for Shankar Jaikishan
- Filmfare Best Male Playback Award for Mukesh
- Filmfare Best Lyricist Award for Verma Malik
- Filmfare Best Supporting Actor Award for Pran, who refused to accept on the grounds that the Filmfare Award for Best Music should have gone to Ghulam Mohammed and Naushad for Pakeezah and not Shankar Jaikishan for Be-Imaan.

Nominated

- Best Supporting Actress – Nazima
