= Manoj Kumar =

Indian film actor and filmmaker (1937–2025)

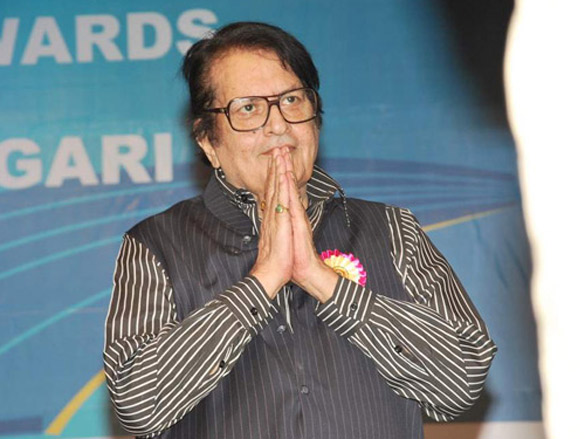
- Kumar in 2010
- Born: Harikrishan Giri Goswami; 24 July 1937; Abbottabad, North-West Frontier Province, British India (present-day Khyber Pakhtunkhwa, Pakistan)
- Died: 4 April 2025 (aged 87); Mumbai, Maharashtra, India
- Other name: Bharat Kumar
- Occupations: Actor; film director; film producer; screenwriter; lyricist; editor; politician
- Years active: 1957–1999
- Works: Full list
- Political party: Bharatiya Janata Party
- Spouse: Shashi Goswami (m. 1961)
- Children: 2; including Kunal Goswami
- Parent(s): Father: H.L. Goswami, Mother: Krishna Kumari Goswami
- Relatives: Manish R Goswami (brother)
- Awards: Full list
- Honours: Padma Shri (1992); Dadasaheb Phalke Award (2015)

Harikrishan Giri Goswami, professionally known as Manoj Kumar (24 July 1937 – 4 April 2025), was an Indian actor, director, screenwriter, lyricist and editor who worked in Hindi cinema. He is regarded as one of the greatest and most accomplished actors of Indian cinema. He is noted for his acting in patriotism-themed films. In a career spanning over four decades, he worked in 55 films.

Kumar was honoured with the Padma Shri in 1992 and Dadasaheb Phalke Award in 2015 by the Government of India for his contribution to Indian cinema and arts. He was also the recipient of a National Film Award and seven Filmfare Awards.

== Early life ==
Kumar was born in Abbottabad, modern-day Pakistan, into a Punjabi Hindu (Saraswat Brahmin) family.

When he was 10, his family migrated from his ancestral village Jandiala Sher Khan to Delhi due to the partition of India. He completed a Bachelor of Arts degree from Hindu College before pursuing acting. He decided to go by the name Manoj Kumar, inspired by Dilip Kumar's eponymous character in the 1949 film Shabnam.

== Career ==
=== 1957–1964: Debut and rise to prominence ===
After making a début in Fashion (1957), followed by minor roles in Sahara (1958), Chand (1959) and Honeymoon (1960), Kumar landed his first leading role in Kaanch Ki Gudiya (1961). Piya Milan Ki Aas (1961), Suhag Sindoor (1961), Reshmi Roomal (1961) followed, but most of these productions went unnoticed.

His breakthrough came in 1962 with Vijay Bhatt's Hariyali Aur Rasta opposite Mala Sinha. The success of Hariyali Aur Rasta was followed by Shaadi (1962), Dr. Vidya (1962), Grahasti (1963) and Phoolon Ki Sej (1964), all four of which performed well at the box office. Kumar also found success as the main lead with Raj Khosla's mystery thriller Woh Kaun Thi? (1964). The film emerged as a blockbuster, featuring songs composed by Madan Mohan, such as Lag Jaa Gale and Naina Barse Rimjhim performed by Lata Mangeshkar.

=== 1965–1981: Stardom ===
The year 1965 marks the start of Kumar's rise to stardom. His first release was patriotic drama Shaheed, based on the life of Bhagat Singh, an Independence Movement revolutionary. It received highly positive responses from critics as well as the then Prime Minister of India Lal Bahadur Shastri, and was a box office success. In late 1965, Kumar was seen in romantic drama Himalay Ki God Mein and the mystery thriller Gumnaam.

In 1966, he reunited with Khosla for Do Badan alongside Asha Parekh. This film featured songs by the lyricist Shakeel Badayuni, including Raha Gardishon Mein sung by Mohammed Rafi, and Lo Aa Gayi Unki Yaad sung by Lata Mangeshkar. He also appeared in Shakti Samanta's Sawan Ki Ghata opposite Sharmila Tagore that year.

After the Indo-Pakistani war of 1965, Prime Minister Lal Bahadur Shastri asked him to create a film based on the popular slogan Jai Jawan Jai Kissan ("Hail the soldier, hail the farmer"). The result was his directorial debut Upkar (1967) that opened to critical acclaim and emerged as the third-highest grossing Hindi-language film at the time, behind Mughal-E-Azam (1960) and Sangam (1964). One of the songs from the film Mere Desh Ki Dharti is played often during the Republic Day and Independence Day celebrations in India. Upkar won Kumar the National Film Award for Second Best Feature Film as well as his first Filmfare Best Director Award. Among his next few releases in 1967, Patthar Ke Sanam performed well at the box office while Anita opposite Sadhana received negative reviews.

In 1968, he co-starred with Raaj Kumar and Waheeda Rehman in Neel Kamal. Later, he reunited with Rehman for Aadmi with Dilip Kumar as the leading man. Neel Kamal proved to be a blockbuster, becoming the third highest-grossing film of 1968. Aadmi was also a box office success.

Kumar's only release in 1969 was the adaptation of Mohan Sehgal's Happy Go Lovely (1951) called Sajan opposite Asha Parekh. The film was ranked tenth among the highest-grossing films of that year.

Kumar appeared next in Purab Aur Paschim (1970) which gained recognition both in India and overseas. The film secured a United Kingdom release in 1971, and ran for over 50 weeks in London, earning £285,000, equivalent to ₹2.5 million (US$332,252.41), surpassing the UK box office record of Do Raaste which released in the UK in 1969. Purab Aur Paschim held this record for 23 years, until the 1994 release of Hum Aapke Hain Kaun. His other releases in 1970 included Yaadgaar and Pehchan, both of which were box office successes. The same year, Kumar played a supporting role in Raj Kapoor's Mera Naam Joker which became cult-classic despite not performing well at the time of release.>

In 1971, Kumar starred in Balidaan which received a lukewarm response. The following year, he appeared in Sohanlal Kanwar's Be-Imaan for which he received his first and only Filmfare Award for Best Actor. He also directed and acted in Shor. One of the songs featured in the film Ek Pyar Ka Nagma Hai, a Lata Mangeshkar-Mukesh duet composed by Laxmikant–Pyarelal, was listed at #29 in the Binaca Geetmala annual list 1972. Shor won the Filmfare Award for Best Editing.

In mid-1970s, Kumar delivered three blockbusters in a row starting with the social drama Roti Kapada Aur Makaan which he also directed. Released on 18 October 1974, the film ensemble cast included Shashi Kapoor, Amitabh Bachchan, Zeenat Aman and Moushmi Chatterjee. The film's album, composed by Laxmikant–Pyarelal, became the fifth best-selling Hindi-language film album of the 1970s.

In 1975, Kumar reunited with Sohanlal Kanwar for Sanyasi which emerged as a blockbuster, ranking third at the box office that year. For his portrayal of a religious-minded young man in the film, he received his fourth and final nomination for Filmfare Award for Best Actor. He later appeared in the 1976 action-crime film Dus Numbri.

In 1977, Kumar had two releases, the much delayed Amaanat and Shirdi Ke Sai Baba. After a year-long break, he starred in a Punjabi film Jat Punjabi. Kumar directed and appeared in the 1981 historical drama Kranti alongside Dilip Kumar, Hema Malini, Shashi Kapoor, Parveen Babi and Shatrughan Sinha.

=== 1987–1999: Later career ===
After Kranti, Kumar's career began to decline, as his subsequent appearances in Kalyug Aur Ramayan (1987), Santosh (1989), Clerk (1989) and Deshwasi (1991) failed to garner attention at the box office. He retired from acting after the 1995 film Maidan-E-Jung. He directed his son, Kunal Goswami, in the 1999 film Jai Hind. The film was a box office failure and the last film Kumar worked on. At the 44th Filmfare Awards that year, he was honoured with the Lifetime Achievement Award for his career in film spanning over 40 years.

=== Politics ===
Similarly to other Bollywood stars, Kumar decided to enter politics following his retirement. Before the 2004 Indian general election, he officially joined Bharatiya Janata Party.

== Death ==
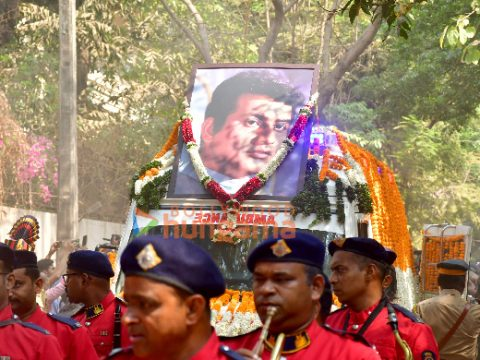
Kumar's portrait on the ambulance in which his body was carried

Kumar was admitted to Kokilaben Dhirubhai Ambani Hospital in Mumbai, where he died on 4 April 2025 at the age of 87 due to chronic heart-related complications. The secondary cause of death was decompensated liver cirrhosis, according to the medical certificate issued by the hospital.

The Government of Maharashtra approved his cremation with state honours at the Pawan Hans crematorium the next day. In a letter addressed to Kumar's wife, Shashi Goswami, Prime Minister Narendra Modi recalled his experience meeting with the actor and praised his contribution to the Indian cinema. President Droupadi Murmu, expressing her condolences, said, "Kumar left an indelible mark on Indian cinema with his patriotic films, which promoted pride in India's values and contributions. The iconic roles he played—whether as national heroes, farmers, or soldiers—will always be remembered. His work will continue to inspire generations." On 12 April 2025, his ashes were immersed in the Ganges at Haridwar, Uttarakhand by his sons Vishal and Kunal.

== Legacy ==
As of 2025, Manoj Kumar is the second most successful Bollywood actor of all time, after Dilip Kumar, with over 56% box-office successes and numerous gross records. Many of the films he directed including Upkar (1967), Roti Kapada Aur Makaan (1974) and Kranti (1981) sold around 40–50 million tickets in India alone.

In 2022, he featured in Outlook India's "75 Best Bollywood Actors" list.

Kumar's signature move of covering his face with one hand has been referenced in numerous popular culture contexts. In 2007, the Shah Rukh Khan's Om Shanti Om featured the lead character pretending to be Manoj Kumar, so as to sneak into a movie premiere, by holding his hand over his face. Kumar, displeased by the caricature, filed a lawsuit which was settled out of court.

== Personal life ==
Kumar was married to Shashi Goswami (born 7 October 1938) on December 1961. The couple met while in college before Kumar turned to acting. Shashi was offered a film role in 1957, but Kumar told her that "only one of them should work in films." As a result, she chose to work in a few radio plays instead. They have two sons, Vishal and Kunal.

== Sources ==
- "Manoj Kumar Biography in Hindi". Yugantar Pravah (in Hindi). 4 April 2025.
