= List of Hindi films of 1960 =

A list of films produced by the Bollywood film industry based in Mumbai in 1960.

== Highest-grossing films ==
The ten highest-grossing films at the Indian box office in 1960:

Rank	Title	Gross collection
1	Mughal-e-Azam	₹11 crore
2	Barsaat Ki Raat	₹3.5 crore
3	Kohinoor	₹3 crore
4	Chaudhvin Ka Chand	₹2.5 crore
5	Jis Desh Mein Ganga Behti Hai	₹2 crore
6	Dil Apna Aur Preet Parayi	₹1.8 crore
7	Love in Simla	₹1.7 crore
8	Ghunghat	₹1.6 crore
9	Kanoon	₹1.5 crore
10	Kala Bazar	₹1.4 crore

== A-D ==
Title	Director	Cast	Genre	Notes
Aai Phirse Bahar	A. Bhimsingh	Sivaji Ganesan, Padmini, Ragini, Raja Sulochana	Family Drama	Music by Vedpal Sharma. Dubbed in Hindi from Tamil
Aanchal	Vasant Joglekar	Ashok Kumar, Nanda, Lalita Pawar, Nirupa Roy	Family Drama	Nanda won the Filmfare Best Supporting Actress Award. Music: C. Ramchandra Lyrics: Vasant Joglekar.
Abdulla	Aakkoo	Shakila, Mahipal, Hiralal, Ajit, Helen	Fantasy Adventure	Music: Bulo C. Rani Lyrics: Shewan Rizvi
Alam Ara Ki Beti	Nanubhai Vakil	Daljeet, Naina, Shashikala, Tun Tun	Fantasy	Music by Vipin Datta, lyrics by Noor Devasi, Anwar Farukhabadi
Airmail	B. J. Patel	Ranjan, Malini, Mirajkar	Action	Music: S. Kwatra Lyrics: Anand Bakshi
Amar Prem	Ramanna	Shivaji Ganesan, Savitri, B.M. Vyas	Drama	Music: Sanmukh Babu. Lyrics: Vinod Sharma, Kavi Pradeep. Dubbed in Hindi from Tamil
Angulimaal	Vijay Bhatt	Nimmi, Bharat Bhushan, Anita Guha, Prem Adib, Ulhas, Achala Sachdev, Manmohan Krishna, Helen	Adventure Drama	Music: Anil Biswas, Lyrics: Bharat Vyas
Anuradha	Hrishikesh Mukherjee	Balraj Sahni, Leela Naidu, Abhi Bhattacharya, Ranu, Nazir Hussain, Mukri, Asit Sen, Bhudo Advani, Rashid Khan	Family Social	Entered in the 11th Berlin International Film Festival, Music: Ravi Shankar Lyrics:Shailendra
Apna Ghar	Ram Pahwa	Premnath, Shyama, Nanda, Moti Sagar, Leela Mishra, Kammo, Krishan Dhawan	Family Social	Music: Ravi, lyrics: Prem Dhawan
Apna Haath Jagannath	Mohan Sehgal	Kishore Kumar, Sayeeda, Nazir Hussain, Sabita Chatterjee, Leela Chitnis	Comedy Romance	Music: S. D. Burman Lyrics: Kaifi Azmi, story-Rajinder Singh Bedi
Babar	Hemen Gupta	Shubha Khote, Sulochana Choudhury, Gajanan Jagirdar, Azra	Historical	Music by Roshan. Lyrics by Sahir Ludhianvi
Bade Ghar Ki Bahu	Kundan Kumar	Abhi Bhattacharya, Geeta Bali, Kuldeep Kaur, Sunder	Family Drama	Music: Chitragupta. Lyrics: Tanvir Naqvi
Bahaana	Kumar	Meena Kumari, Sajjan, Anwar Hussain, Krishna Kumari, Kumar, Pramila, Azurie, Sheela Vaz	Social	Music: Madan Mohan Lyrics: Rajendra Krishan
Bahadur Lutera	Kay Cee Kay	Ram Mohan, Manju, Kamal Mehra, Radhika	Action Adventure	Music: B. N. Bali
Banjarin	Jaswant Zaveri	Kanchan Kamini, Manhar Desai, Lalita Kumari	Drama Action	Music: Pardeshi Lyrics: Pt. Madhur
Baraat	K. Amarnath	Ajit, Shakila, Salim Khan, Mukri	Romance, Drama	Music: Chitragupta. Lyrics: Majrooh Sultanpuri
Barood	Aspi Irani	Sheikh Mukhtar, Kumkum, Sudhir, Honey Irani, Mukri, Veena, Tun Tun.	Social Drama	Music by Khayyam. Lyrics by Hasrat Jaipuri
Barsaat Ki Raat	P. L. Santoshi	Bharat Bhushan, Madhubala, Shyama, Chandrashekhar, K.N. Singh	Musical Romance	Music by Roshan. Lyrics by Sahir Ludhianvi
Basant (1960 film)	Bibhuti Mitra	Pran, Nutan, Shammi Kapoor, Minoo Mumtaz, Kammo, Murad, Johnny Walker, Cuckoo	Romance Drama	Music by O. P. Nayyar. Lyrics by Qamar Jalalabadi
Bewaqoof	I. S. Johar	Pran, I. S. Johar, Mala Sinha, Kishore Kumar, Helen	Comedy Romance	Music by S. D. Burman. Lyrics by Majrooh Sultanpuri
Bhakta Raj	V. M. Vyas	Sulochana, Shahu Modak, Trilok Kapoor, Lalita Pawar, Dara Singh	Devotional	Music by Avinash Vyas. Lyrics by Bharat Vyas
Bhakti Mahima	K. Shankar	A. Nageswara Rao, B. Saroja Devi, Jamuna, Gopi Krishna	Devotional	Dubbed in Hindi. Music by Dilip Roy. Lyrics By Saraswati Kumar Deepak
Bindiya	Krishnan–Panju	Padmini, Balraj Sahni, Vijaya Choudhary, Minu Mumtaz, Lalita Pawar, Rajendra Nath, Om Prakash,	Family Drama	Music by Iqbal Qureshi, Lyrics by Rajendra Krishan
Black Rider	Mehmood	Kamran, Krishna Kumari, Nazma, Habib	Action	Music by Harbans Lal. Lyrics by Naqsh Lyallpuri
Black Tiger	Akkoo	Nadira, Azad, Habib, Nazma	Action	Music: Bulo C. Rani Lyrics: Tabish Kanpuri, Saba Afghani
Bombai Ka Babu	Raj Khosla	Dev Anand, Suchitra Sen, Nazir Hussain, Achala Sachdev, Manohar Deepak	Crime Drama	Music by S. D. Burman, Lyrics by Majrooh Sultanpuri
Bombay Central	R. K. Balam	Samar Roy, Krishna Kumari	Action	Music by Shyam Babu Pathak, Lyrics by R. K. Balam
Captain India	C. Kent	Kamran, Mehmood, Krishna Kumari	Action	Music: Hemant Kedar Lyrics: Rajaram Saki
Chand Mere Aja	Ram Daryani	Nanda, Bharat Bhushan, Lalita Pawar, Maruti	Drama Social	Music by Chitragupta. Lyrics by Prem Dhawan
Chandramukhi	K. Thakur	Manhar Desai, Kavita, B. M. Vyas, Maruti	Romance Costume Drama	Music by S. N. Tripathi. Lyrics by Bharat Vyas
Chaudhvin Ka Chand	M. Sadiq	Guru Dutt, Rehman, Waheeda Rehman, Johnny Walker	Romance Social Drama	Entered in the 2nd Moscow International Film Festival. Music: Ravi Lyrics: Shakeel Badayuni
Chhabili	Shobhna Samarth	Nutan, Tanuja, Kaysi Mehra, Helen, K. N. Singh	Social Drama	Music by Snehal Bhatkar, lyrics by S Ratan. Nutan sang "ae mere humsafar"
Chhalia	Manmohan Desai	Raj Kapoor, Nutan, Pran, Rehman, Shobhna Samarth	Social Romance	Music: Kalyanji Anandji, assisted by Lakshmikant-Pyarelal. Lyrics by Qamar Jalalabadi
College Girl	T. Prakash Rao	Shammi Kapoor, Vyjayanthimala, Om Prakash, Tabassum, Nana Palsikar, Achala Sachdev	Romance Drama	Music: Shankar Jaikishan Lyrics: Rajendra Krishan
Dekha Jayega	O.P Dutta	Kamran, Ararnath, Lillian, Dog Moti, Nasrin	Action Adventure	Music: Sardul Singh Kwatra, Lyrics by Farukh Kaser
Delhi Junction	Mohammed Hussain	Ajit, Shakila, Nishi, Pran, Cuckoo	Action Adventure	Music: Kalyanji Anandji. Lyrics: Gulshan Bawra
Dil Apna Aur Preet Parai	Kishore Sahu	Raaj Kumar, Meena Kumari, Nadira, Tun Tun, Helen, Om Prakash	Romantic Drama	Music: Shankar-Jaikishan, Lyrics: Shailendra, Hasrat Jaipuri.
Dil Bhi Tera Hum Bhi Tere	Arjun Hingorani	Dharmendra, Arjun Hingorani, Balraj Sahni, Kumkum	Drama Social	Music by Kalyanji Anandji, lyrics by Shamim Jaipuri, K L Pardesi. Debut movie of Dharmendra
Do Aadmi	Dwarka Khosla	Jairaj, Shashikala, Jeevankala	Social Drama	Music by S. N. Tripathi, lyrics by Prem Dhawan
Do Dost	K. Anand	Kamran, Chitra, Mehmood, Helen	Social Action	Music by S. Mohinder, lyrics by Bharat Vyas
Dr. Shaitan	Shriram Bohra	Premnath, Shakila, Sheikh Mukhtar, Tiwari	Thriller Action	Music by N. Datta. Lyrics by Jan Nisar Akhtar
Duniya Jhukti Hai	JBH Wadia	Sunil Dutt, Shyama, Kumkum, Daisy Irani, Agha	Family Social	Music: Hemant Kumar Lyrics:Rajendra Krishan

== E-M ==
Title	Director	Cast	Genre	Notes
Eid Mubarak	Khwaja Ahmad Abbas		Children Festival	Short Film category
Ek Ke Baad Ek	Raj Rishi	Dev Anand, Tarla Mehta, Sharda, Prabhu Dayal	Family Drama	Music by S. D. Burman, lyrics: Kaifi Azmi
Ek Phool Char Kante	Bhappi Sonie	Sunil Dutt, Waheeda Rehman, Johnny Walker, Gopi, Tun Tun.	Family Comedy Romance	Music: Shankar Jaikishan Lyrics: Shailendra, Hasrat Jaipuri
Gambler	Dwarka Khosla	Prem Nath, Shakila, Pran, K. N. Singh	Action Thriller	Music: Chitragupta Lyrics: Prem Dhawan
Ghar Ki Laaj	Om Prakash	Sohrab Modi, Nirupa Roy, Kumkum, Madan Puri	Family Drama	Rajendra Krishan-Ravi
Ghunghat	Ramanand Sagar	Bharat Bhushan, Leela Chitnis, Pradeep Kumar, Bina Rai, Asha Parekh, Helen, Rajendra Nath, Rehman, Agha	Family Drama Social	Music: Ravi Lyrics: Shakeel Badayuni
Girl Friend	Satyen Bose	Waheeda Rehman, Kishore Kumar, Daisy Irani, Nazir Hussain, Bipin Gupta	Romance Family Social	Music: Hemant Kumar Lyrics: Sahir Ludhianvi
Hanuman Pathal Vijayam				
Honeymoon	Lekhraj Bhakri	Manoj Kumar, Sayeeda Khan, Vijaya Choudhury	Family Drama	Music: Salil Chowdhury Lyrics: Shailendra
Hum Hindustani	Ram Mukherjee	Sunil Dutt, Joy Mukherjee, Asha Parekh, Prem Chopra, Helen, Leela Chitnis, Sanjeev Kumar	Family Social Drama	Popular song: Chhodo Kal Ki Baaten, Kal Ki Baat Puraani Music: Usha Khanna Lyrics: Prem Dhawan
Jaali Note	Shakti Samanta	Dev Anand, Madhubala, Om Prakash, Madan Puri, Helen	Crime Social Romance	Music: O. P. Nayyar Lyrics: Raja Mehdi Ali Khan
Jis Desh Mein Ganga Behti Hai	Radhu Karmakar	Raj Kapoor, Padmini, Pran, Lalita Pawar	Social	Music: Shankar Jaikishan Lyrics: Shailendra, Hasrat Jaipuri
Jo Huwa So Bhool Ja	Y. Pethkar	Nanda, Shashikala, Raja Gosavi, Vivek, Nalini Chonkar	Social	Music: B N Bali Lyrics: Hari Malik
Kala Aadmi	Ved Madan	Ashok Kumar, Shyama, Johnny Walker, Mehmood, Minu Mumtaz	Thriller Drama	Music: Dattaram Wadkar Lyrics: Hasrat Jaipuri
Kala Bazar	Vijay Anand	Dev Anand, Waheeda Rehman, Nanda, Vijay Anand, Chetan Anand, Madan Puri, Leela Chitnis	Romance Drama	Music: S. D. Burman Lyrics: Shailendra
Kalpana	Rakhan	Ashok Kumar, Padmini, Ragini, Iftekhar, Achala Sachdev	Drama Romance	Music: O.P Nayyar Lyrics: Raja Mehendi Ali Khan, Qamar Jalalabadi, Jan Nissar Akhtar, Hasrat Jaipuri
Kanoon	B. R. Chopra	Rajendra Kumar, Nanda, Ashok Kumar, Mehmood, Shashikala, Jeevan, Om Prakash	Crime Courtroom Drama	Music: Salil Choudhury There were no songs in the movie. B. R. Chopra won the Filmfare Award for Best Director (1962) for Kanoon
Kohinoor	S. U. Sunny	Dilip Kumar, Meena Kumari, Jeevan, Mukri, Tun Tun, Leela Chitnis	Costume Drama	Music: Naushad Lyrics: Shakeel Badayuni
Lady Of The Lake	A. M. Khan	Nilima, Azad, Krishna Kumari	Costume Thriller Action	Music: Suresh Talwar Lyrics: Anjaan, Saba Afghani, Munshi Nayab
Lal Quila	Nanabhai Bhatt	Jairaj, Nirupa Roy, Kumar, Helen, Kamal Kapoor	Historical Musical Romance	Music: S. N. Tripathi Lyrics: Bahadur Shah Zafar, Bharat Vyas
Love in Simla	R. K. Nayyar	Joy Mukherjee, Sadhana, Shobhna Samarth, Durga Khote	Romance	Music: Iqbal Qureshi Lyrics: Rajendra Krishan
Maa Baap	V. M .Vyas	Rajendra Kumar, Kamini Kaushal, Pran	Family Social Drama	Music: Chitragupta Lyrics: Rajendra Krishan
Manzil	Mandi Burman	Dev Anand, Nutan, Krishan Dhawan, Achala Sachdev and K. N. Singh	Romance Musical	Music: S.D. Burman Lyrics: Majrooh Sultanpuri
Masoom	Satyen Bose	Ashok Kumar, Sarosh Irani, Honey Irani and Mohan Choti.	Family Children	Screenwriter Ruby Sen won the Filmfare Award for Best Story. Nominated for Filmfare Award for Best Movie Music: Robin Banerjee, Hemant Kumar for Nani Teri Morni Ko Lyrics: Shailendra
Maya Machhendra	Babubhai Mistri	Nirupa Roy, Manhar Desai, Raj Kumar	Mythology Costume	Music: Ramlal-Heerapanna Lyrics: Pt. Madhur, Deepak, Keshav
Mehlon Ke Khwab	Muhafiz Haider	Madhubala, Chanchal, Kishore Kumar, Pradeep Kumar, Om Prakash, Pran, K.N. Singh	Comedy Suspense Romance	Music: S. Mohinder Lyrics: Anand Bakshi
Mera Ghar Mere Bachche	Sohrab Modi	Subiraj, Sohrab Modi, Soodesh Kumar, Naaz, Daisy Irani, Nana Palsikar, Sulochana	Family Drama	Music: Sardar Malik Lyrics: Hasrat Jaipuri
Miss Goodnight	Jugal Kishore	Nishi, Jairaj, Veena, Gopal Saigal, Tiwari, Tun Tun	Action Romance	Music: Hansraj Behl Lyrics: Prem Dhawan
Mitti Mein Sona	Jugal Kishore	Mala Sinha, Pradeep Kumar, Agha, Sabita Chatterjee	Social Romance	Music: O. P. Nayyar Lyrics: Raja Mehdi Ali Khan, Qamar Jalalabadi, S. H. Bihari
Miyan Biwi Razi	Jyoti Swaroop	Mehmood, Kamini Kadam, Shreekant Gaurab, Seema, Sabita Chatterjee, David, Manorama	Family Social	Music: S. D. Burman Lyrics: Shailendra
Mohabbat Ki Jeet	B. S. Ranga	Ranjan, Raja Sulochana, Sowcar Janaki, Cuckoo	Romance Action Costume	Music: Mohammed Shafi Lyrics: Shri Ram Saaz
Mud Mud Ke Na Dekh	Ramayan Tiwari	Bharat Bhushan, Anita Guha, Mehmood, Jeevan, Prem Chopra, Helen	Romance Social	Music: Hansraj Behl Lyrics: Prem Dhawan
Mughal-e-Azam	K. Asif	Prithviraj Kapoor, Dilip Kumar, Madhubala, Durga Khote, Ajit, Jalal Agha	Historical Costume Romance	Music: Naushad Lyrics: Shakeel Badayuni. It won the National Film Award for Best Feature Film in Hindi. The film also won three Filmfare Awards: Best Film, Best Cinematography, and Best Dialogue

== N-Z ==
Title	Director	Cast	Genre	Notes
Nache Nagin Baje Been	Tara Harish	Chandrashekhar, Kumkum, K. N. Singh, Sunder, Helen, Agha	Costume Drama	Music: Chitragupta Lyrics: Majrooh Sultanpuri
Nai Maa	P. L. Santoshi	Balraj Sahni, Shyama, Daisy Irani, Maruti, Sheela Kashmiri	Family Drama	Music: Ravi Lyrics: Sarvar
Nakhrewali	N. Buli	Daljeet, Radhika, Bhagwan	Romance Social	Music: Chitragupta, Nirmal Kumar
Parakh	Bimal Roy	Sadhana, Motilal, Durga Khote, Leela Chitnis, Nishi	Social Satire Drama	Music: Salil Choudhury Lyrics: Shailendra. Bimal Roy won the Filmfare Best Director Award; Motilal the Filmfare Best Supporting Actor Award and George D'Cruz the Filmfare Best Sound Award
Patang	Suraj Prakash, Hargovind Duggal	Mala Sinha, Rajendra Kumar, Achala Sachdev, Leela Mishra	Family Drama Crime	Music: Chitragupta Lyrics: Rajendra Krishan
Pedro	Akkoo	Azad, Chitra, B. M. Vyas, Tiwari, Pedro:monkey	Action	Music: Bulo C. Rani Lyrics: Khawar Zamaa
Phool Aur Kaliyan	Ram Gabale	Hemant, Nitin, Dattaram, Ramesh	Children Social	Won the gold medal for best children's film at the National Awards. Music: Shivram Krishna Lyrics: Bharat Vyas
Police Detective	Nanubhai Bhatt	Shyama, Soodesh Kumar, Jayshree Gadkar, Anwar, Shammi, David	Social Action	Music: Chitragupta Lyrics: Majrooh Sultanpuri
Qatil	Mohammed Hussain	Prem Nath, Chitra, Shyam Kumar, Kamal Mehra	Action	Music: Nashad (Shaukat Ali Dehlavi) Lyrics: Khumar Barabankvi, Faruk Kaiser
Rangeela Raja	Ismail	Mahipal, Shashikala, Kumkum, Bhagwan		Music: Pandit Shivram Lyrics: Asad Bhopali
Return of Mr. Superman	Manmohan Sabir	Jairaj, Sheila Ramani, Shammi, Majnu, Helen, David	Action	Music: Anil Biswas Lyrics: Manmohan Sabir, Pyarelal Santoshi, Kaif Irfani
Road No. 303	Dharam Kumar	Mehmood, Shubha Khote, Bhagwan, K. N. Singh	Action	Music: C. Arjun Lyrics: Jan Nisar Akhtar
Saranga	Dhirubhai Desai	Soodesh Kumar, Jayshree Gadkar, Nilofar, Jankidas. B. M. Vyas	Drama	Music: Sardar Malik Lyrics: Bharat Vyas
Sarhad	Shanker Mukerji	Dev Anand, Suchitra Sen, Ragini, Anwar Hussein, Lalita Pawar, Dhumal	Social Romance Drama	Music: C. Ramchandra Lyrics: Majrooh Sultanpuri
Shan-e-Hind	Mohan Sinha	Nigar Sultana, Daljeet, Kumkum	Action Costume	Music: Sudipto Bannerjee Lyrics: Pratap
Shriman Satyawadi	S. M. Abbas	Raj Kapoor, Shakila, Mehmood, Nasir Hussain	Social Drama	Music: Dattaram Lyrics: Hasrat Jaipuri, Gulzar, Gulshan Bawra
Singapore	Shakti Samanta	Shammi Kapoor, Padmini, Maria Menado, Shashikala, Helen	Thriller Romance	Music: Shankar Jaikishan Lyrics: Shailendra, Hasrat Jaipuri
Superman	Mohammed Hussain, Anant Thakur	Jairaj, Nirupa Roy, Helen, Neeta	Action	Music: Sardar Malik Lyrics: Prem Dhawan
Teer Aur Talwar	Mohamed Hussain	Kamran, Kamal Mehra, Rajan Kapoor	Action Drama	Music: Nisar Lyrics: Faruk Kaiser
Trunk Call	Balraj Mehta	Shyama, Abhi Bhattacharya, Pran, Helen, Shammi	Action Drama	Music: Ravi Lyrics: Qamar Jalalabadi
Tu Nahin Aur Sahi	Brij	Pradeep Kumar, Kumkum, Nishi, Ratan Kumar, Minoo Mumtaz	Social Romance	Music: Ravi Lyrics: Majrooh Sultanpuri
Usne Kaha Tha	Moni Bhattacharjee	Sunil Dutt, Nanda, Indrani Mukherjee, Rajendra Nath, Durga Khote	Romance Drama War	Music: Salil Chowdhury Lyrics: Shailendra
Veer Durgadas	Ramchandra Thakur	Jairaj, Nirupa Roy, B. M. Vyas, Manhar Desai	Historical Social Drama	Music: S. N. Tripathi Lyrics: Bharat Vyas
Veer Purush	Phani Mazumdar		Children Social	Based on a poem by Rabindranath Tagore
Zalim Tera Jawab Nahin	Ramanlal Desai	Chitra, Azad, Agha, Saroj Khan	Action	Music: S. D. Batish Lyrics: Shadab, Farid Tonki, Aziz Siddiqui
Zameen Ke Tare	Chandulal J. Shah	Daisy Irani, Honey Irani, Motilal, Achala Sachdev, Anwar, Kumud Tripathi, Agha, Charlie, Bhagwan	Social Children Drama	Music: S. Mohinder Lyrics: Pandit Madhur
Zimbo Comes To Town (Zimbo Shaher Mein)	Nanubhai Bhatt	Azad, Chitra, Shammi, Bhagwan, Nilofar	Action	Music: Chitragupta Lyrics: Prem Dhawan
