= 4th Filmfare Awards =

1957 awards for Hindi cinema

- Date: 5 May 1957
- Site: Bombay

Highlights
- Best Film: Jhanak Jhanak Payal Baaje
- Best Actor: Dilip Kumar for Devdas
- Best Actress: Nutan for Seema
- Most awards: Jhanak Jhanak Payal Baaje (4)
- Most nominations: Jhanak Jhanak Payal Baaje (4)

The 4th Filmfare Awards were held on 5 May 1957, in Bombay, honoring the best films in Hindi cinema for the year 1956.

Jhanak Jhanak Payal Baaje led the ceremony with 4 nominations, followed by Devdas with 3 nominations, and C.I.D., Seema and Shree 420 with 2 nominations each.

Jhanak Jhanak Payal Baaje won 4 awards, including Best Film and Best Director (for V. Shantaram), thus becoming the most-awarded film at the ceremony.

While most of the nominated films were released in 1956, the films which won most of the main awards were 1955 releases. Devdas, Jhanak Jhanak Payal Baaje, Seema and Shree 420 were 1955 films, but were not considered for the 3rd Filmfare Awards.

For the first time in the history of Filmfare Awards did a winner refuse to accept their award – Vyjayanthimala, who won Best Supporting Actress for Devdas, declined her award as she thought that her role was not supporting and was equally important as that film's other female lead, Suchitra Sen.

Nutan won her first of five Best Actress awards for her performance in Seema.

== Main awards ==
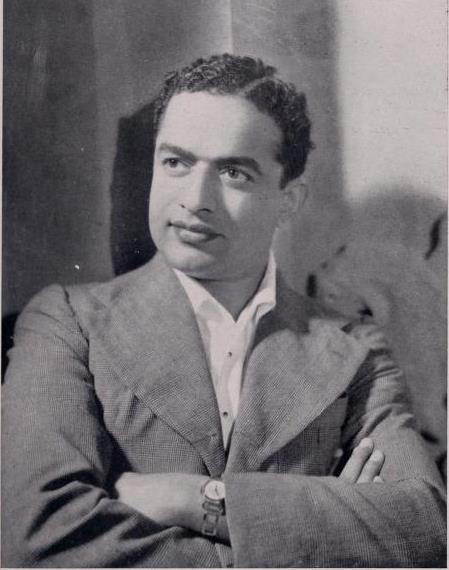
V. Shantaram, Best Director

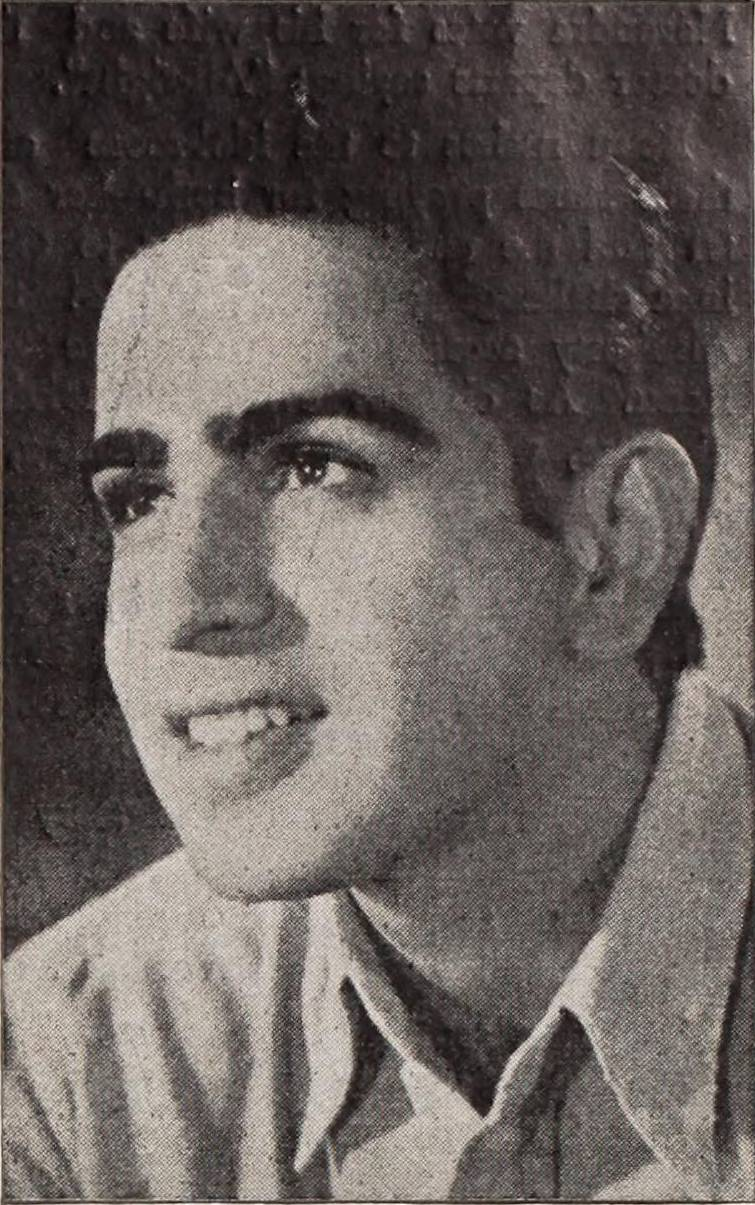
Dilip Kumar, Best Actor

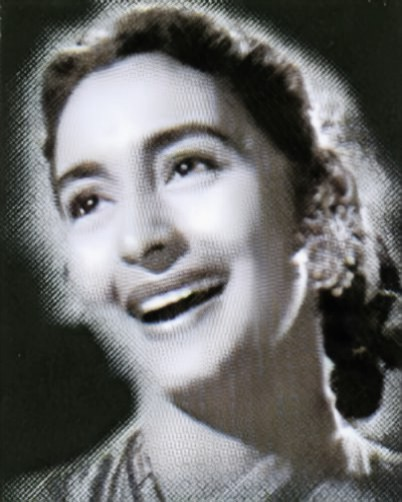
Nutan, Best Actress

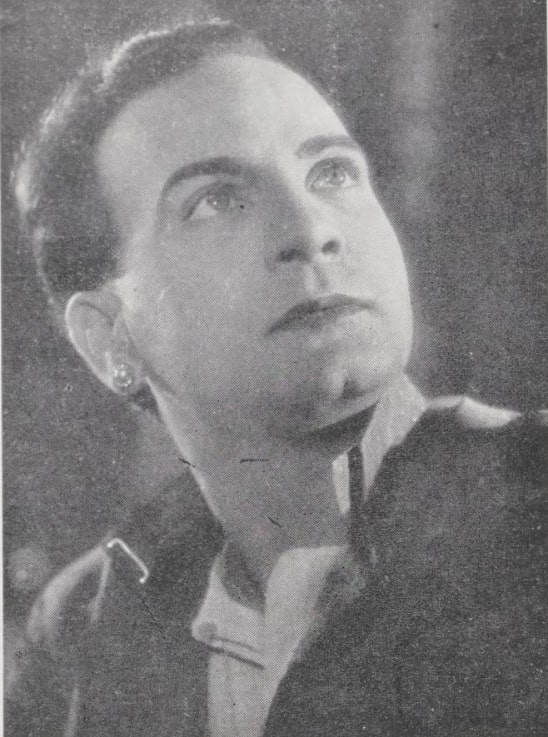
Motilal, Best Supporting Actor

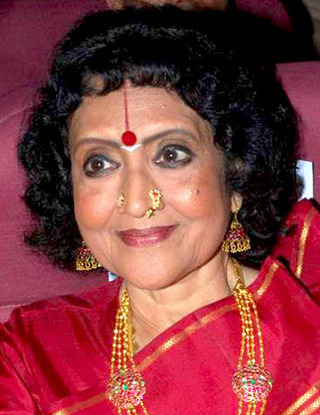
Vyjayanthimala, Best Supporting Actress

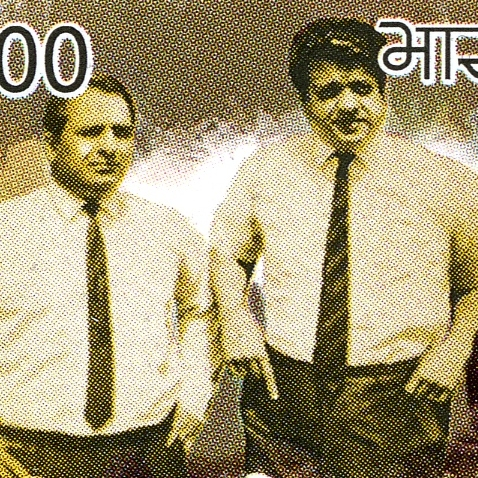
Shankar-Jaikishan, Best Music Director

Best Film	Best Director
Jhanak Jhanak Payal Baaje – Rajkamal Kala Mandir – V. Shantaram	V. Shantaram – Jhanak Jhanak Payal Baaje
Best Actor	Best Actress
Dilip Kumar – Devdas as Devdas Mukherjee; Raj Kapoor – Jagte Raho as Peasant	Nutan – Seema as Gauri
Best Supporting Actor	Best Supporting Actress
Motilal – Devdas as Chunni Babu; Johnny Walker – C.I.D. as Master	Vyjayanthimala – Devdas as Chandramukhi
Best Music Director	Best Story
Shankar–Jaikishan – Chori Chori; O. P. Nayyar – C.I.D.	Amiya Chakravarty – Seema

== Technical awards ==
Best Editing	Best Cinematography
G. G. Mayekar – Shree 420	Radhu Karmakar – Shree 420
Best Art Direction	Best Sound Design
Kanu Desai – Jhanak Jhanak Payal Baaje	A. K. Parmar – Jhanak Jhanak Payal Baaje

== Superlatives ==
The following films had multiple wins and/or multiple nominations

Movie	Awards	Nominations
Jhanak Jhanak Payal Baaje	4	4
Devdas	3	3
Seema	2	2
Shree 420	2	2
C.I.D.	0	2

== See also ==
- 11th Filmfare Awards
- 9th Filmfare Awards
- Filmfare Awards
