= 8th Filmfare Awards =

1961 awards for Hindi cinema

- Date: 1961
- Site: Bombay

Highlights
- Best Film: Mughal-e-Azam
- Best Actor: Dilip Kumar for Kohinoor
- Best Actress: Bina Rai for Ghunghat
- Most awards: Chaudhvin Ka Chand, Mughal-e-Azam & Parakh (3)
- Most nominations: Mughal-e-Azam (11)

The 8th Filmfare Awards were held in Bombay in 1961 to honor the best films in Hindi cinema released in 1960.

K. Asif's magnum opus Mughal-e-Azam led the ceremony with 11 nominations, followed by Chaudhvin Ka Chand with 6 nominations and Parakh with 5 nominations.

Chaudhvin Ka Chand, Mughal-e-Azam and Parakh won 3 awards each, thus becoming the most-awarded films at the ceremony.

Mughal-e-Azam, considered one of the greatest and most successful films of Bollywood, was expected to steam-roll the competition, controversially went home with just 3 wins out of its 11 nominations, including Best Film, but missed out on Best Director (for K. Asif), Best Lyricist (for Shakeel Badayuni for "Pyar Kiya To Darna Kiya"), Best Playback Singer (for Lata Mangeshkar for "Pyar Kiya To Darna Kiya") and all 4 acting categories. Another glaring upset was Naushad's loss for Best Music Director for Mughal-e-Azam's epic soundtrack to Shankar–Jaikishan for Dil Apna Aur Preet Parai.

Dilip Kumar received dual nominations for Best Actor for his performances in Kohinoor and Mughal-e-Azam, winning for the former.

Madhubala received her first and only nomination for Best Actress for her performance as Anarkali in Mughal-e-Azam, which is considered to be amongst the greatest acting performances of Indian Cinema. However, she lost the award to Bina Rai who won the award for Ghunghat, her first and only win in the category.

== Main awards ==
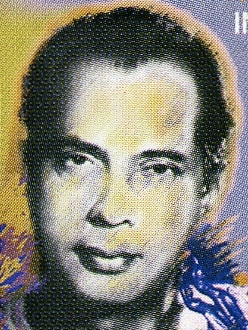
Bimal Roy, Best Director

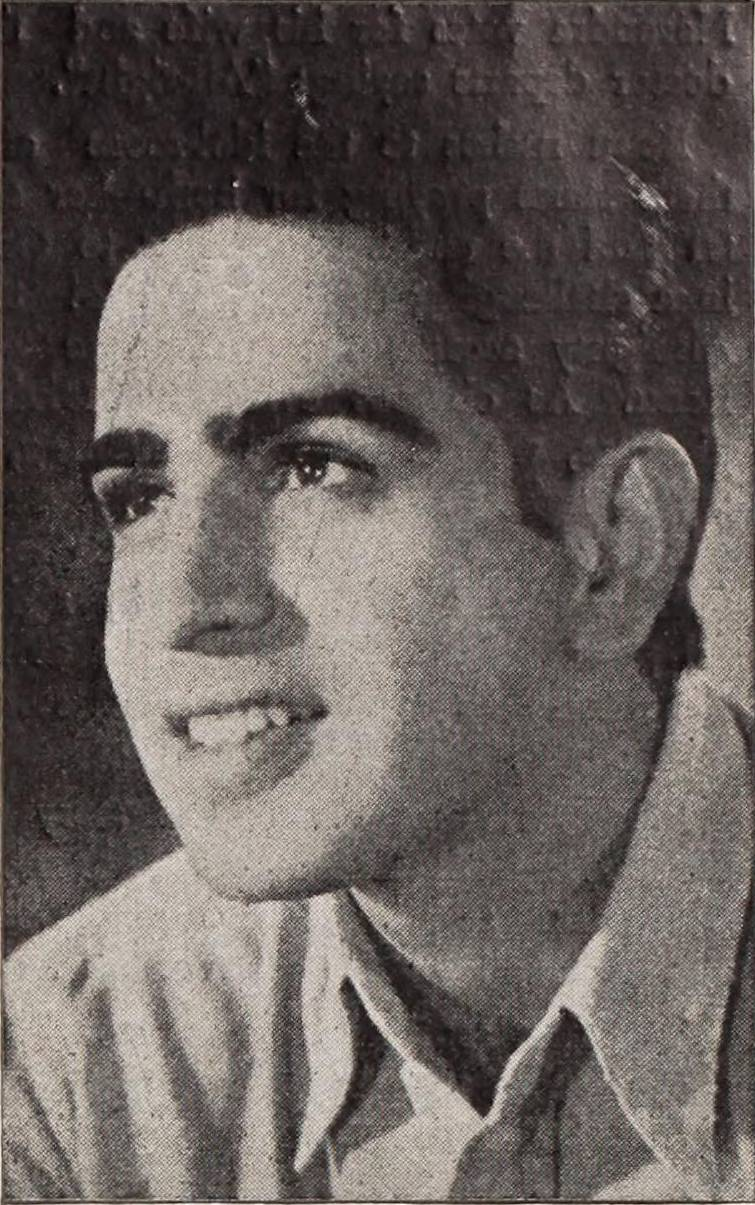
Dilip Kumar, Best Actor

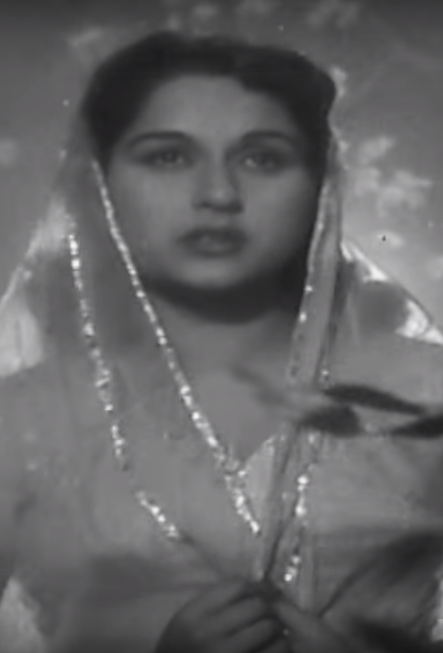
Bina Rai, Best Actress

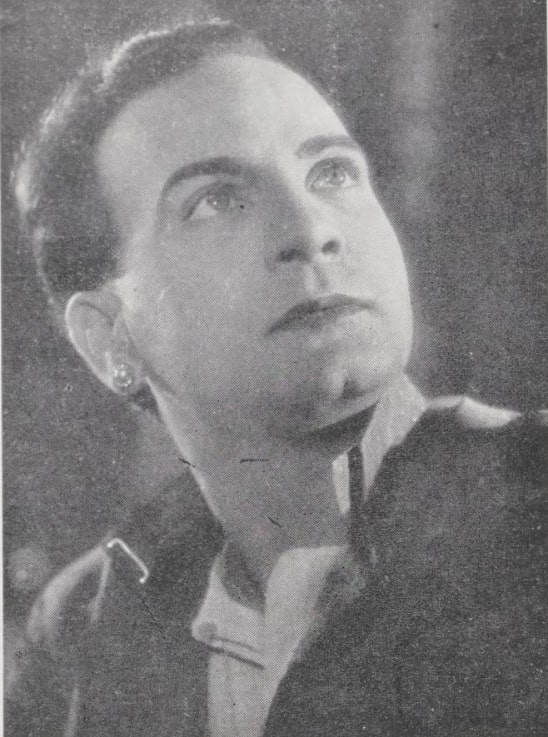
Motilal, Best Supporting Actor

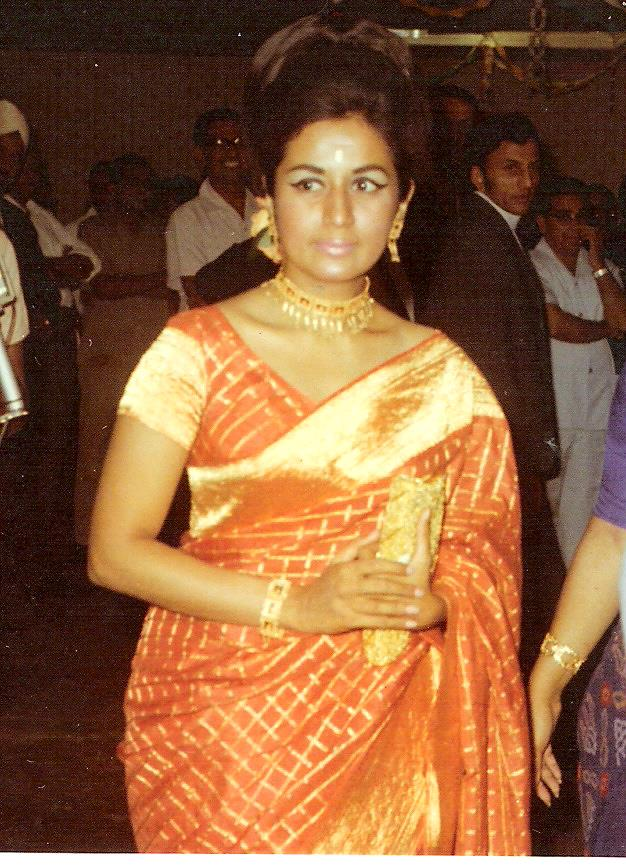
Nanda, Best Supporting Actress

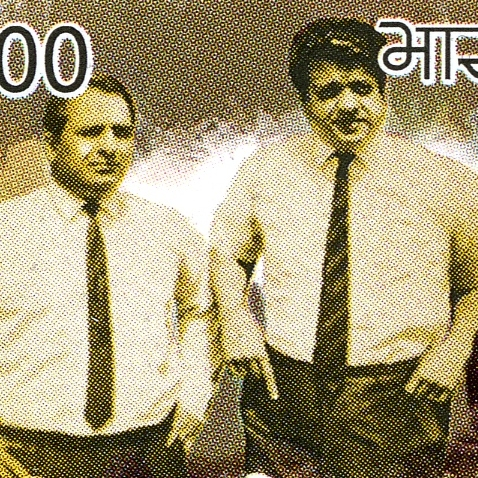
Shankar Jaikishan, Best Music Director

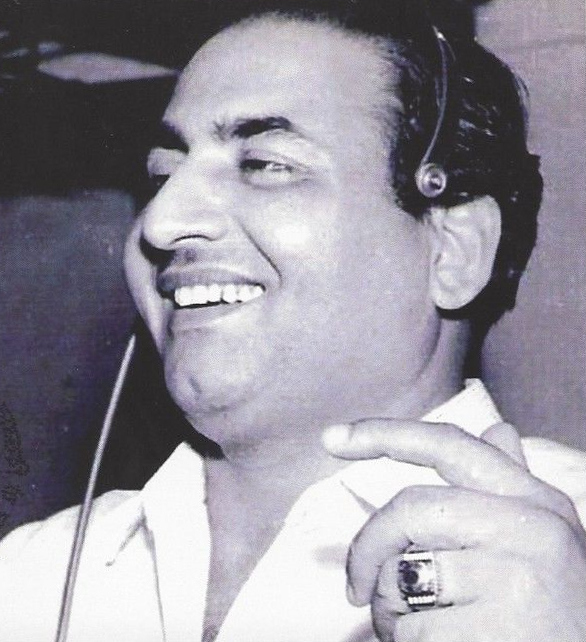
Mohammed Rafi, Best Playback Singer

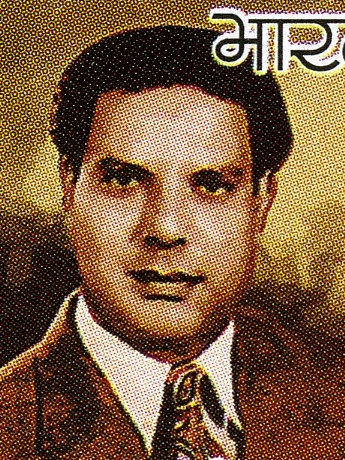
Shakeel Badayuni, Best Lyricist

Best Film	Best Director
Mughal-e-Azam; Masoom; Parakh	Bimal Roy – Parakh; K. Asif – Mughal-e-Azam; Kishore Sahu – Dil Apna Aur Preet Parai
Best Actor	Best Actress
Dilip Kumar – Kohinoor as Prince Dhivendra Pratap Bahadur Chandrabhan; Dev Anand – Kala Bazar as Raghuvir; Raj Kapoor – Chhalia as Chhalia	Bina Rai – Ghunghat as Parvati / Jamuna; Madhubala – Mughal-e-Azam as Anarkali; Nutan – Chhalia as Shanti
Best Supporting Actor	Best Supporting Actress
Motilal – Parakh as Haradhan / Sir Jagdish Chandra Roy; Agha – Ghunghat as Agha; Prithviraj Kapoor – Mughal-e-Azam as Emperor Akbar; Rehman – Chaudhvin Ka Chand as Pyare Mohan / Nawab Sahib	Nanda – Aanchal as Nanda; Durga Khote – Mughal-e-Azam as Maharani Jodha Bai; Kumkum – Kohinoor as Rajlakshmi; Lalita Pawar – Aanchal as Mother
Best Music Director	Best Lyricist
Shankar–Jaikishan – Dil Apna Aur Preet Parai; Naushad – Mughal-e-Azam; Ravi – Chaudhvin Ka Chand	Shakeel Badayuni – "Chaudhvin Ka Chand" from Chaudhvin Ka Chand; Shailendra – "Dil Apna Aur Preet Parai" from Dil Apna Aur Preet Parai; Shakeel Badayuni – "Pyar Kiya To Darna Kiya" from Mughal-e-Azam
Best Playback Singer – Male	Best Playback Singer – Female
Mohammed Rafi – "Chaudhvin Ka Chand" from Chaudhvin Ka Chand	Award won by a male singer; Lata Mangeshkar – "Dil Apna Aur Preet Parai" from Dil Apna Aur Preet Parai; Lata Mangeshkar – "Pyar Kiya To Darna Kya" from Mughal-e-Azam
Best Story	Best Dialogue
Ruby Sen – Masoom; Saghir Usmani – Chaudhvin Ka Chand; Salil Chowdhury – Parakh	Aman, Kamal Amrohi, Wajahat Mirza, Ehsan Rizvi — Mughal-e-Azam

== Technical Awards ==
Best Editing	Best Cinematography
Moosa Mansoor — Kohinoor	R. D. Mathur — Mughal-e-Azam
Best Art Direction	Best Sound Design
Biren Nag — Chaudhvin Ka Chand	George D'Cruz — Parakh

== Superlatives ==
The following films had multiple wins and/or nominations

Movie	Awards	Nominations
Mughal-e-Azam	3	11
Chaudhvin Ka Chand	3	6
Parakh	3	5
Kohinoor	2	3
Dil Apna Aur Preet Parai	1	3
Aanchal	1	2
Ghunghat	1	2
Masoom	1	2
Chhalia	0	2

== See also ==
- 9th Filmfare Awards
- 7th Filmfare Awards
- Filmfare Awards
