= K. N. Singh =

Indian actor (1908–2000)

Krishan Niranjan Singh
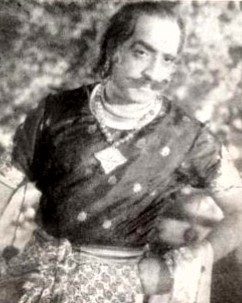
- Singh in the film Ratnavali
- Born: 1 September 1908; Dehradun, United Provinces of Agra and Oudh, British India (present-day Uttarkhand, India)
- Died: 31 January 2000 (aged 91); Mumbai, Maharashtra, India
- Occupations: Film actor, director and producer
- Years active: 1936–1996
- Children: Pushkar Singh (son)
- Father: Chandi Prasad Singh

Krishan Niranjan Singh (1 September 1908 – 31 January 2000), known as K. N. Singh in Indian cinema, was a prominent villain and character actor. He appeared in over 200 Hindi films over a long career stretching from 1936 to the late 1980s.

== Career ==
=== Early years (1908–1936) ===
The son of Chandi Prasad Singh, an erstwhile Indian prince and a prominent criminal lawyer, K.N. Singh was a sportsman who once dreamt of being in the army. Born in Dehradun, Singh was expected to follow in the footsteps of his father and become a lawyer. However, his father's skillful defence, which saved an obviously guilty man from the gallows, turned him away from the profession.

Turning his energy to sports, K.N. Singh came to excel in the javelin throw and the shot put. He was selected to represent India in the 1936 Berlin Olympics before circumstances compelled him to go to Calcutta to attend on his ailing sister. There he met his family friend Prithviraj Kapoor, who introduced him to director Debaki Bose, who offered him a debut role in his film Sonehra Sansar (1936).

=== Popular villain (1936 to late 1960s) ===
K.N. Singh enjoyed limited success until the release of Baghban (1938), in which he played the antagonist. Baghban was a golden jubilee hit, establishing Singh as one of the leading villains of the era.

Through the 1940s and 1950s, Singh appeared in several iconic movies of the era, including Sikandar (1941), Jwar Bhata (1944) (Dilip Kumar's film debut), Humayun (1945), Awara (1951), Jaal (1952), CID (1956), Howrah Bridge (1958), Chalti Ka Naam Gaadi (1958), Amrapali (1966) and An Evening in Paris (1967).

As opposed to playing angry mobsters, he mostly played a white collared gentleman villain, dressed in a fine suit and smoking a pipe, with a calm cold delivery.

His suave style, baritone voice and menacing eyes became legendary – so much so that on one occasion (in his own words) "Even off-screen I was a bad man. One day on my way back from shooting, I had to deliver an envelope at an address given to me by my friend. I pressed the doorbell and, from the moving curtains, I could see a woman hurrying to open the door. When she saw me standing in front of her, she screamed out in fright and ran inside leaving the door open."

As an actor, Singh's thirst for learning was legendary. For example, he studied the style and mannerisms of carriage riders to prepare for the role of a horse carriage driver in Inspector (1956).

=== Later years (1970 to late 1980s) ===
Singh played prominent roles in movies such as Jhoota Kahin Ka (1970), Haathi Mere Saathi (1971 film) and Mere Jeevan Saathi (1972 film). His last prominent role was in the 1973 film Loafer (1973 film).

With advancing years, Singh became less active, particularly from the mid 1970s onwards. Many of his roles from the late 1970s onwards were mere cameo appearances, arranged with the sole purpose of ensuring that actors turned up on time – such was his stature that actors would never turn up late when K.N. Singh was on the set. His last but one appearance was in Woh Din Aayega (1986).He also acted in "Ajooba"(1991) which was his last film.

== Personal life ==
Singh was the eldest among 6 siblings: a sister and five brothers.He adopted Pushkar, the son of his brother Bikram (who was once the editor of Filmfare magazine) as their son.

Singh became completely blind in his last years and had a fall in his home after which he was almost bedridden. He died in Mumbai on 31 January 2000 aged 91 and was survived by his adopted son Pushkar, who is a producer of television serials.

== Selected filmography ==
Year	Film	Role	Notes
1936	Sonehra Sansar	A doctor	Debut film
1936	Hawai Daku - Bandit Of The Air		
1936	Karodpati		
1937	Anaath Aashram		
1937	Milap	A lawyer	Bilingual film (Bengali and Hindi)
1937	Mukti	A guest at Chitra's father's party	
1937	Vidyapati		Bengali film
1938	Baghban	Ranjit	His first film as the antagonist
1938	Nirala Hindustan - Industrial India		
1938	Sitara		
1939	Aap Ki Marzi		
1939	Pati Patni		
1939	Thokar	A doctor	
1940	Apni Nagariya		
1941	Sikandar	King Aambhi	
1942	Ek Raat		
1942	Phir Milenge		
1943	Prarthana	A doctor	
1943	Prithvi Vallabh	Bhillam	
1943	Shahenshah Akbar		
1944	Draupadi		
1944	Jwar Bhata		
1944	Maharathi Karna	Duryodhana	
1944	Pattharon Ka Saudagar		
1945	Humayun	Jai Singh	
1945	Mazdoor		
1945	Ratnavali		
1946	Rangbhoomi		
1946	Room No. 9	Pratap	
1947	Chalte Chalte		
1947	Parwana	Kishan	
1947	Zanjeer		
1949	Barsaat	Bholu	
1949	Paras		
1949	Singaar	Dr. Kishan's father	
1950	Banwra		
1950	Nirdosh		
1951	Awara	Jagannath "Jagga"	
1951	Baazi	Rajani's father	
1951	Halchal	Chandan	
1951	Saagar		
1951	Sanam	Sadhana's father	
1951	Sazaa	Durjan Singh	
1952	Aandhiyan	Kuber Das	
1952	Doraha		
1952	Ghunghroo		
1952	Insaan		
1952	Jaal	Carlos	
1952	Parbat	Parbat's obsessive lover	
1953	Armaan		
1953	Baaz	Barborosa	
1953	Shahenshah		
1953	Shikast	Madho	
1954	Angarey	Dozila	
1954	Badshah		
1954	Ehsan		
1954	Sangam		
1955	House No. 44	Captain	
1955	Marine Drive	Khanna	
1955	Milap	Karam Chand	
1956	C. I. D.	Rekha Mathur's father	
1956	Funtoosh	Karodi Lal	
1956	Inspector	Badri Prasad	
1956	Zindagi Ke Mele		
1957	Bade Sarkar	Maan Singh	
1957	Beti		
1957	Hill Station		
1957	Mera Salaam		
1957	Ustad		
1958	Chaalbaaz		
1958	Chalti Ka Naam Gaadi	Hardayal Singh	
1958	Chandan		
1958	Chaubees Ghante		
1958	Detective		
1958	Howrah Bridge	Pyarelal	
1958	Kabhi Andhera Kabhi Ujala		
1958	Taxi Stand		
1959	Bank Manager	Ranjit	
1959	Forty Days	Bholanath	
1959	Kali Topi Lal Rumal	Jaggu	
1959	Keechak Vadha		
1960	Barsaat Ki Raat	Khan Bahadur	
1960	Chhabili		
1960	Gambler		
1960	Manzil	Raj Kumar Mehta's father	
1960	Mehlon Ke Khwab	Motilal	
1960	Nache Nagin Baje Been		
1960	Road No. 303		
1960	Singapore	Shivdas	
1961	Dark Street		
1961	Krorepati	Hukumat Rai	
1961	Miss Chalbaaz		
1961	Opera House	Danial	
1961	Passport	Shyamlal alias Shamsher Singh	
1961	Reshmi Rumal	Rai Sahib	
1961	Salaam Memsaab		
1961	Sapan Suhane	Baldev	
1961	Senapati		
1962	Hong Kong		
1962	Isi Ka Naam Duniya Hai	Varma	
1962	Naqli Nawab	Nawab Sharafat Ali	
1962	Raaz Ki Baat	Singh	
1962	Soorat Aur Seerat		
1962	Vallah Kya Baat Hai	Firoz Singh	
1963	Lado Rani		Punjabi film
1963	Shikari	Dr. Cyclops	
1964	Dulha Dulhan	Dharam Singh	
1964	Woh Kaun Thi ?	Dr. Singh	
1965	Bombay Race Course		
1965	Ek Saal Pehle		
1965	Faraar	Public Prosecutor	
1965	Raaka	Vishal	
1965	Rustom-e-Hind		
1966	Amrapali	Badbadhra Singh	
1966	Mera Saaya	Prosecuting Lawyer	
1966	Street Singer		
1966	Teesri Manzil	Manohar	
1967	An Evening in Paris	Jack	
1967	Johar in Bombay		
1967	Raat Aur Din	Varuna's father	
1968	Dil Aur Mohabbat	Singh	
1968	Ek Phool Ek Bhool	Dr. Rakesh's father	
1968	Mere Huzoor	Hakim	
1968	Spy in Rome	Dr. Chang	
1968	Teri Talash Mein		Uncredited
1969	Jigri Dost	Neelkanth	
1969	Nateeja	Boss	
1969	Sapna		
1969	Shart	Singh	
1969	Simla Road		
1970	Dagabaaz		
1970	Ehsan	Dinanath alias Vishwanath Prasad	
1970	Himmat	Mathur	
1970	Mangu Dada		
1970	Meeting	Mahendranath	
1970	Muder on Highway		
1970	Pagla Kahin Ka	Max	
1970	Suhana Safar	Dr. Singh	
1970	Tarzan 303		
1970	The Revenger		
1971	Dushmun	Saxena	
1971	Haathi Mere Saathi	Shravan Kumar	
1971	Hum Tum Aur Woh	Advocate	
1971	Jaane-Anjaane	Poonamchand	
1971	Pyar Ki Kahani	Ram's boss	
1971	Reshma Aur Shera	Chowdhary	
1972	Bansi Birju	Jaggu	
1972	Do Bachche Dus Haath	Girdhari	
1972	Do Chor	Tribhuvan Singh	
1972	Mere Jeevan Saathi	Govind Ram	
1973	Daaman Aur Aag	Singh	
1973	Hanste Zakhm	One of Chanda's patrons	
1973	Kuchhe Dhaage	Sona's father	
1973	Keemat	Chief of Secret Services	
1973	Loafer	Singh	
1973	Sabak	Ajit	
1974	Badhti Ka Naam Dadhi	Khadak Singh	
1974	Hamrahi	V. K.	
1974	Jeevan Rekha		
1974	Majboor	Prosecuting Attorney	
1974	Sagina	Factory Owner	
1974	Vachan		
1975	Dimple		
1975	Kaala Sona	Police Commissioner	
1975	Prem Kahani	Rai Bahadur Shrikant Sinha	
1975	Qaid	Dr. Trivedi	
1975	Rafoo Chakkar		
1975	Romeo in Sikkim		
1976	Adalat	Singh	
1976	Harfan Maulaa	Police Inspector	
1976	Meera Shyam		
1977	Agent Vinod	Vinod's Chief	
1977	Jadu Tona		
1977	Mamta		
1977	Mera Vachan Geeta Ki Kasam	Khan Bahadur	
1977	Saheb Bahadur	Pashupathi	
1979	Guru Ho Jaa Shuru	C. B. I. Chief	Uncredited
1979	Zulm Ki Pukar		
1980	Do Premee	Shivlal "Mahayogi"	
1980	Dostana	Judge	
1981	Farz Aur Pyar	Senior Air Force Officer	
1981	Kaalia	A convict	
1981	Professor Pyarelal		
1981	Shraddhanjali	Amit's Diwan	
1982	Teri Maang Sitaron Se Bhar Doon	Nataraj	
1983	Bekhabar		
1984	Sardaar	Mathur	
1984	The Gold Medal	Singh	
1987	Hukumat	Deen Bandhu Deena Nath's friend	Cameo
1987	Woh Din Aayega	Hukumat	
1988	Soorma Bhopali		
1992	Laat Saab	K. N. Singh	
1994	Laila		
1996	Daanveer		Last released film
