= Kabhi Andhera Kabhi Ujala =

- Directed by: C. P. Dixit
- Starring: Kishore Kumar; Nutan; Kumkum
- Music by: O. P. Nayyar
- Release date: 1958
- Country: India
- Language: Hindi

Kabhi Andhera Kabhi Ujala is a 1958 Hindi film starring Kishore Kumar and Nutan.

== Cast ==
- Kishore Kumar
- Nutan
- Kumkum
- Shekhar
- Chitra
- Helen
- Madan Puri
- Lala Yaqoob
- T. Kirshna Kumari as Rati
- Lalita Pawar
- K. N. Singh

== Soundtrack ==
Song	Singer
"Surma Mera Nirala"	Kishore Kumar
"Jahanwalo Ise Kahte Hai Duniya"	Kishore Kumar
"Kabhi Andhera, Kabhi Ujala"	Asha Bhosle
"Bhagwan, Tujhe Rote Hue"	Asha Bhosle
"Ladaye Saiyan Naina"	Asha Bhosle
"Zara Sone De Balam"	Asha Bhosle
"Bahon Ko Zara Lehra De Ankhon Mein Ankhen Dalke"	Asha Bhosle, Manna Dey
"Main Hoon Chanda Ki Chhori"	Asha Bhosle, Shamshad Begum
