= Amiya Chakravarty (director) =

Indian film director, screenwriter and producer (1912–1957)

- Born: 30 November 1912; Bogra, Bengal Province, British India
- Died: 6 March 1957 (aged 44); Bombay, Bombay State, India
- Occupations: Film director, screenwriter and producer
- Spouse: Kamala Chakravarty

Amiya Chakravarty (30 November 1912 – 6 March 1957) was an Indian film director, screenwriter and producer, who was leading film director in Hindi cinema of the 1940s and 1950s. He is noted for films like Daag (1952), Patita (1953), and Seema (1955) for which he won the 4th Filmfare Award for Best Story. Chakravarty is also credited along with Devika Rani for discovering Dilip Kumar, whom he gave his first break in 1944 film Jwar Bhata (1944 film). Chakravarty also produced and directed, for Mars & Movies Productions which he had launched after leaving Bombay Talkies, the film Daag in 1952 for which Dilip Kumar won his first ever Filmfare Award for Best Actor.

He was married to Saraswati Shastri a.k.a. Kamala, younger sister of Lakshmi Shankar (née Shastri) wife of Rajendra Shankar, elder brother of Sitar maestro, Ravi Shankar.

== Filmography ==
Year	Film	Director	Producer	Writer	Notes
1940	Bandhan			Yes	
1941	Anjaan	Yes		Yes	
1942	Basant	Yes			
1944	Jwar Bhata	Yes			
1947	Mera Suhaag	Yes			
1949	Girls' School	Yes			
1950	Gauna	Yes			
1951	Badal	Yes		Yes	
1952	Daag	Yes	Yes	Yes	
1952	Deshabakthan	Yes			
1953	Shahenshah	Yes			
1953	Patita	Yes	Yes		
1955	Seema	Yes	Yes		Filmfare Award for Best Story
1957	Kathputli	Yes		Yes	
1957	Dekh Kabira Roya	Yes	Yes	Yes	
