= Hum Log (film) =

- DVD cover
- Directed by: Zia Sarhadi
- Written by: Zia Sarhadi
- Produced by: Chandulal Shah
- Starring: Nutan; Balraj Sahni; Shyama; Durga Khote
- Cinematography: H. S. Kwatra
- Edited by: Baburao Marwad
- Music by: Roshan
- Production company: Ranjit Movietone
- Release date: 1951
- Running time: 144 minutes
- Country: India
- Language: Hindi

Hum Log (transl. We, The People) is a 1951 Indian Hindi social realist film written and directed by Zia Sarhadi.

Dealing with the trials and tribulations of a middle-class family, the film stars Nutan, Shyama, Durga Khote, Balraj Sahni and Sajjan in lead roles. Nutan earned positive notice for her portrayal of a tuberculosis patient and so did Sahni who played her brother. The film was a commercial success and established Nutan as a rising star in the film industry.

== Cast ==
The cast is as follows:

- Nutan as Paro
- Shyama as Shepali
- Durga Khote as Mother
- Balraj Sahni as Raj
- Sajjan as Anand
- Anwar Hussain as Kundan
- Kanhaiyalal as Lalaji / Haricharandas
- Manmohan Krishna as Mamaji
- Cuckoo as Dancer

== Production ==
According to author Bunny Reuben, the film was Balraj Sahni's first break in the film industry. Rajendra Kumar was first signed by producer Shah to play the part of Anand, but a few days into the filming was replaced by Sajjan. The film took six months to complete.

== Release and reception ==
The film did well at the box office and, according to Box Office India, was among the ten highest-grossing Indian films of 1951. Its success consolidated Nutan's position as a rising star. The Tribune wrote in a piece about Nutan's career, "Nutan projected the emotions of a tuberculosis patient so realistically that she went on to win laurels." Author Meghnad Desai described it as a "film about the problems faced by a lower middle class family", noting the acting of Nutan and Sahni, and calling it "a conscious criticism of how ordinary people were oppressed in their daily struggle against forces of power and wealth". Bunny Reuben praised it as "a strong, bold and outspoken film".

Author and biographer T. J. S. George wrote, "Zia Sarhadi's Humlog (1951) about the frustrations of the middle class was rendered sensitively by an inspired Balraj Sahni and a convincingly consumptive Nutan."

Hum Log went on to form part of Sarhadi's trilogy of films made in the 1950s, along with Footpath (1953) and Awaaz (1956).

== Sources ==
- Alimchand, Seema Sonik (25 February 2020). Jubilee Kumar: The Life and Times of a Superstar. Hachette India. ISBN 978-93-88322-40-9.
- Booch, Harish S.; Doyle, Karing (1962). Star-portrait: Intimate Life Stories of Famous Film Stars. Lakhani Book Depot.
- Desai, Meghnad (2004). Nehru's Hero Dilip Kumar in the Life of India. Lotus Collection, Roli Books. ISBN 978-81-7436-311-4.
- George, T. J. S. (1994). The Life and Times of Nargis. Megatechnics. ISBN 978-81-7223-149-1.
- Raheja, Dinesh; Kothari, Jitendra (1996). The Hundred Luminaries of Hindi Cinema. India Book House Publishers. ISBN 978-81-7508-007-2.
- Rajadhyaksha, Ashish; Willemen, Paul (1999). Encyclopedia of Indian Cinema. Routledge. ISBN 978-1-135-94325-7.
- Reuben, Bunny (1993). Follywood Flashback: A Collection of Movie Memories. Indus. ISBN 978-81-7223-106-4.
- Sahni, Balraj (1979). Balraj Sahni: An Autobiography. Hind Pocket Books.
