= Devi (1970 film) =

- Film poster
- Directed by: V. Madhusudhana Rao
- Written by: Inder Raj Anand (screenplay); Prem Kapoor (dialogue); R. S. Mani (story)
- Produced by: T. M. Kittu; A. V. Subramaniam
- Starring: Nutan; Sanjeev Kumar
- Cinematography: Rajendra Malone
- Edited by: N. M. Shankar
- Music by: Laxmikant-Pyarelal
- Release date: 3 April 1970
- Country: India
- Language: Hindi

Devi is a 1970 film directed by V. Madhusudhana Rao. It stars Nutan, Sanjeev Kumar in the lead roles. The music of the film was composed by Laxmikant-Pyarelal.

== Film poster ==
The film posters show different themes of the film as was often done with posters. The First shows the dutiful mother and wife caring for her child. The second shows the man smoking while leering at a dancing girl.

== Cast ==
- Nutan as Devi
- Sanjeev Kumar as Dr. Shekhar
- Rehman as Shekhar's Elder Brother
- Madan Puri as Joginder
- Mehmood as Rajaram
- Aruna Irani as Rani
- Farida Jalal as Shobha
- Lalita Pawar as Shobha's Mother
- Sulochana Latkar as Jamna
- Manmohan Krishna as Dharamdas
- Gajanan Jagirdar as Ram Singh
- Mukri as Sunder
- Lalita Kumari as Laxmi
- Dina Pathak as Dharamdas' Sister
- Manorama as Munnibai
- Sarika as Master Deepak

== Soundtrack ==
Song	Singer
"Ek Hai Sab Hindustani"	Asha Bhosle
"Teri Haseen Nigah Ka, Ehsanmand Hoon"	Lata Mangeshkar, Mohammed Rafi
"Shaadi Ke Liye"	Mohammed Rafi
"Kya Jhutha Lagta Hai"	Mohammed Rafi
"Jogan Pritam Ki"	Usha Iyer, Lakshmi Shankar
