= Shahenshah (1953 film) =

1953 film by Amiya Chakravarty

- promotional poster
- Directed by: Amiya Chakrabarty
- Screenplay by: Rajendra Shankar
- Produced by: G. P. Sippy
- Starring: Ranjan; Kamini Kaushal; Shakila
- Cinematography: Y. D. Sarpotdar
- Edited by: A. Habib
- Music by: S. D. Burman
- Production company: G. P. Productions
- Release date: 13 November 1953
- Country: India
- Language: Hindi

Shahenshah (Urdu: شہنشاہ; translation Emperor) is a 1953 Indian Bollywood action costume drama film directed by Amiya Chakrabarty and produced by G. P. Sippy, which was India's first full-length Gevacolor film and India's third full-length color film.

== Plot ==
The movie is the story of Prince Rashid of Tehran who loses his father and his crown title in an invasion. The loyal Vazir (king's minister) of Tehran helps the Queen Mother, Prince Rashid and the Princess Abassa to flee to neighbouring Baghdad. Upon an old magician's advice, the family hides their identity and lives in obscurity as Baghdad is under the control of an evil Vazir who is in charge of the baby princess Noor. Twelve years roll by and Prince Rashid grows up as a swashbuckling handsome young man who is popular with the poor and is popularly known as Shahenshah, meanwhile Princess Noor turns sixteen and Tehran is ruled by the invader's son, and in a thrilling climax, Prince Rashid wins back Tehran and frees Baghdad from the evil Vazir.

== Cast ==
- Ranjan as Prince Rashid
- Kamini Kaushal as Queen Noor
- Shakila as Princess Naseem
- K. N. Singh as Vazir
- Agha as Bakhtiyar, the King of Tehran
- Mukri
- Achla Sachdev as Queen Mother

== Soundtrack ==
The songs were composed by S. D. Burman and lyrics were penned by Sahir Ludhianvi

Song	Singer
"Jeenewalon Ko Jeete Jee"	Lata Mangeshkar
"Khaak Hua Dil Jalte Jalte"	Lata Mangeshkar
Chahat Ka Khazana Hai Tere Liye	Lata Mangeshkar
"Dil Deke Dil Ko Le Le"	Geeta Dutt
Jaam Thaam Le, Sochate Hi Sochate Naa Beetay Saari Raat	Shamshad Begum
"Aai Baharen Leke Raaten"	Asha Bhosle
Koi Raag Chhed Dabi Aag Chhed	Asha Bhosle
Naazon Ke Pale, Kaanton Pe Chale	Talat Mahmood
Shaahi Ki Zanjeerein Todte Chalo	Manna Dey
