= Jhanak Jhanak Payal Baaje =

- Theatrical poster
- Directed by: V. Shantaram
- Story by: Dewan Sharar
- Produced by: Rajkamal Kalamandir
- Starring: Gopi Krishna; Sandhya; Keshavrao Date; Bhagwan Dada
- Cinematography: G. Balakrishna
- Edited by: Chintamani Borkar
- Music by: Vasant Desai
- Distributed by: Rajkamal Kalamandir
- Release date: 1955
- Running time: 143 min
- Country: India
- Language: Hindi
- Box office: ₹ 2.45 crore

Jhanak Jhanak Payal Baaje (transl. The anklets go jhanak jhanak) is a 1955 Indian Hindi-language dance film directed by V. Shantaram. It stars Shantaram's wife Sandhya and dancer Gopi Krishna in lead roles. One of the earlier Technicolor films made in India, the film won the All India Certificate of Merit for Best Feature Film, the National Film Award for Best Feature Film in Hindi, and the Filmfare Best Movie Award. The film was declared a "Super Hit" by Box office India.

== Plot ==
Classical dance guru Mangal stumbles on a dance performance in a lavish haveli by Neela. He orders his talented son Girdhar to demonstrate to the audience the true method of classical dance. Entranced by Girdhar's skill, Neela begs Mangal to admit her as a pupil. He finally agrees on two conditions: she must devote her life to art and she must partner with Girdhar in the Tandav portion of an upcoming dance competition. As the two practice together, she begins to fall in love with Girdhar. Manilal, a wealthy and jealous man who hopes to have Neela for himself, warns Mangal that the two are falling in love, but he ignores him. When Mangal goes away for some time to buy new costumes for the pair, they confess their love to each other and neglect their dancing in favour of idyllic walks and boat rides. Mangal returns and discovers that the two are in love. Enraged that Girdhar's dancing has suffered and believing that he will now never win the title of Bharat Natarajan, he disowns his son and resolves to leave him.

Dismayed that she has endangered Girdhar's career, Neela pretends that she has cheated on him with Manilal and he returns to his father and his art. The devastated Neela tries to drown herself in the river, but is rescued by a kindly sadhu. She decides to follow the example of the minstrel Meerabai and devotes her life to Krishna, but is alarmed when Girdhar appears, declaring that he cannot forget her. She pretends not to know him and he is enraged; his father takes him away. She becomes ill and the sadhu and her servant Bindiya take her to the temple where the dance competition is being held. Hoping to sabotage his chances, Manilal has bribed Girdhar's new partner to drop out of the competition. Neela takes her place in the Tandav dance and Mangal realizes that she spurned Girdhar to help him win the competition. He then convinces his son to give her a second chance. With the help of Neela, Girdhar wins the competition and Mangal gives the couple his blessing to marry.

== Cast ==
- Sandhya as Neela
- Gopi Krishna as Girdhar
- Keshavrao Date as Mangal Maharaj
- Madan Puri as Manilal
- Manorama as Bindiya
- Chandrakanta
- Mumtaz Begum as Roopkala's mom
- Chowbe Maharaj
- Nana Palsikar as the Sadhu
- Nimbalkar
- Bhagwan as Badlu

== Music ==
Vasant Desai composed the music and Hasrat Jaipuri wrote the lyrics for the film. The song "Jo Tum Todo Piya", inspired by Meerabai was later also used for the 1981 film Silsila. Shivkumar Sharma, the Padma Shri and Padma Vibhushan recipient musician has played Santoor in this film. Santoor was used for the first time in Indian Cinema.

No.	Title	Singer(s)	Length
1.	"Jhanak Jhanak Payal Baaje" (Raga Adana)	Ustad Amir Khan
2.	"Jhanak Jhanak Payal Baaje" (Raga Adana)	Lata Mangeshkar, Hemant Kumar
3.	"Jo Tum Todo Piya" (Raga Bhairavi)	Lata Mangeshkar
4.	"Saiyyan Jao" (Raga Desh)	Lata Mangeshkar
5.	"Suno Suno Suno Ji"	Lata Mangeshkar
6.	"Kaisi Yeh Mohabbat"	Lata Mangeshkar
7.	"Murli Manohar"	Lata Mangeshkar, Manna Dey
8.	"Mere Ae Dil Bata" (Raga Bhairavi)	Lata Mangeshkar, Manna Dey
9.	"Nain So Nain Naahi Milao" (Raga Malgunji)	Lata Mangeshkar, Hemant Kumar
10.	"Raag Malika"	Lata Mangeshkar, Manna Dey
11.	"Chhiyoram Chhiyo"	Mohammed Rafi, Asha Bhosle
12.	"Udhdat Rang Thang Le Gat"	Asha Bhosle
13.	"Rut Basant"	Lata Mangeshkar, Manna Dey

The voice of Asha Bhosle was used in a few lines, which were not available on records, but only on the film soundtrack.

== Awards ==
3rd National Film Awards (1955)

- All India Certificate of Merit for Best Feature Film
- Best Feature Film in Hindi

4th Filmfare Awards (1956)

- Filmfare Award for Best Film
- Filmfare Award for Best Director for V. Shantaram
- Filmfare Award for Best Art Direction for Kanu Desai
- Filmfare Award for Best Sound Design for A. K. Parmar
