= Jwar Bhata (1944 film) =

- Directed by: Amiya Chakravarty
- Starring: Dilip Kumar; Ruma Guha Thakurta; Agha Khan; Vikram Kapoor; Mridula Rani; Shamim Bano
- Cinematography: Radhu Karmakar
- Music by: Anil Biswas (composer)
- Release date: 29 November 1944
- Country: India
- Language: Hindi

Jwar Bhata (lit. 'High and low tides') is a 1944 black and white Indian drama film directed by Amiya Chakravarty. It marked the debut of Dilip Kumar. The film also featured Mridula Rani, Shamim Bano, Agha, Vikram Kapoor, K. N. Singh, Khalil, and Mumtaz Ali. It was produced by Bombay Talkies. The music director was Anil Biswas.

== Plot ==
An elderly man has two daughters named Rama (Shamim) and Renu (Mridula) of marriageable age. When the millionaire scion Narendra (Aga Jaan), who is slated to marry Rama, disguises himself to take a peek at his future bride, he mistakes Renu for Rama, and the two fall in love. When the mistake is discovered after the wedding, Renu curses God and is kicked out the house for heresy. She meets a wandering musician named Jagdish (Dilip Kumar), before returning home to learn that her sister is pregnant and terminally ill. They are faced with the stark choice of saving the life of the mother or the baby, until Renu makes up with God, prompting a miracle.

== Cast ==
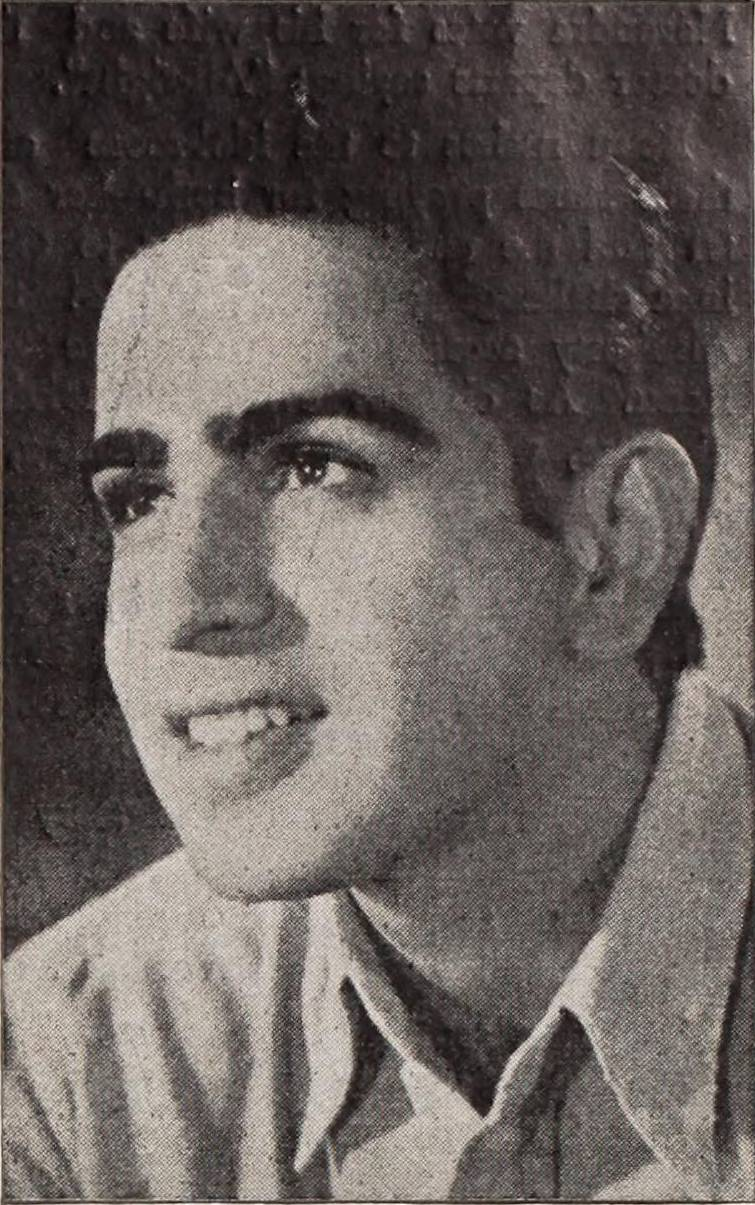
Dilip Kumar in the film

- Dilip Kumar as Jagdish
- Shamim Bano as Rama
- Mridula Rani as Renu
- Aga Jaan as Narendra

== Soundtrack ==
No.	Title	Singer(s)	Length
1.	"Bhool Jana Chahti Hoon"	Parul Ghosh	02:48
2.	"Sanjh Ki Bela Panchhi Akela"	Aroon Kumar	03:01
3.	"Bhoola Bhatka Path Hara Man"	Manna Dey, Parul Ghosh	03:28
4.	"Gao Kabir Udao Abir"	Anil Biswas	02:54
5.	"More Angne Mein Chitki Chandni"	Parul Ghosh	03:09
6.	"Andhkar Jalte Jugnu Ke Sanam (Duet)"	Parul Ghosh, Aroon Kumar	03:08
7.	"Andkhar Jalte Jugnu Ke Sanam (Female)"	Parul Ghosh	03:12
8.	"Prabhu Charanon Mein Deep Jalao"	Parul Ghosh, Amirbai Karnataki	03:16
9.	"Sarson Peeli"	Aroon Kumar, Renu	03:27
Total length:			28:23
