= Hamari Beti =

- Film poster
- Directed by: Shobhna Samarth
- Written by: Motilal
- Produced by: Shobhna Samarth
- Starring: Shobhna Samarth; Motilal; Nutan; Tanuja
- Music by: Snehal Bhatkar
- Release date: 1950
- Country: India
- Language: Hindi

Hamari Beti (transl. Our Daughter) is a 1950 Indian Hindi social comedy film. The directorial debut of Shobhna Samarth, it was the first film produced under her production company, Shobhana Pictures, to launch the acting career of her 14-year-old daughter Nutan, who played the title role. Samarth and Motilal, who wrote the script, starred as Nutan's parents, and Samarth's younger daughter Tanuja also made her debut in this film as a child artiste. Nutan contributed to Snehal Bhatkar's soundtrack for the film, singing the song "Tujhe Kaisa Dulha Bhaaye Re". The film released to considerable attention for Nutan's work.

== Production ==
The film was the directorial debut of Shobhna Samarth, the first under her own production company, Shobhana Pictures, and was made to launch the acting career of her daughter Nutan, who played the title role. Nutan was aged 14 when she acted in the film. She took part in Snehal Bhatkar's soundtrack for the film, singing the song "Tujhe Kaisa Dulha Bhaaye Re". The film also marked the film debut of Samarth's younger daughter Tanuja, who appeared as a child artiste.

Having grown up with complexes around her looks and weight, Nutan was nervous during the making of the film, unsure she could pull it off given how critical she was of her appearance and talents. She recalled an instance where her relatives changed their mind about her after watching the film: "The relatives who called me ugly changed their opinions overnight. They said they were proud of me."

== Cast ==
The cast is as follows:

- Shobhna Samarth
- Motilal
- Nutan
- Tanuja
- Shekhar
- David Abraham Cheulkar
- Cuckoo
- Agha

== Soundtrack ==
Nutan took part in Bhatkar's soundtrack for the film, singing the song "Tujhe Kaisa Dulha Bhaaye Re".

== Reception ==
The Motion Picture Magazine gave a negative review of the film in its February 1951 issue, describing it as "so ordinary a picture that it neither deserves a critical appreciation of its merits nor a severe deprecation of its dismerits" and further dismissed it as "merely a dull boring ineffective photoplay which neither pleases you nor irritates you". The reviewer did note the acting, including Motilal's as "the finest performance in the film" and Nutan's "fine performance" and noted Nutan and Tanuja for showing "great promise". A retrospective review by Cinemaya wrote positively of the film, calling it a "comedy-of-manners scripted with intelligence and sophistication" which revealed Samarth as "a director of refined sensibilities acutely aware of the thin line that lies between tears and laughter in everyday life".

== Sources ==
- Booch, Harish S.; Doyle, Karing (1962). Star-portrait: Intimate Life Stories of Famous Film Stars. Lakhani Book Depot.
- Dawar, Ramesh (2006). Bollywood: Yesterday, Today, Tomorrow. Star Publications. ISBN 978-1-905863-01-3.
- Premchand, Manek (27 December 2018). Yesterday's Melodies Today's Memories. Notion Press. ISBN 978-1-64429-877-0.
- Rajadhyaksha, Ashish; Willemen, Paul (1999). Encyclopedia of Indian Cinema. Routledge. ISBN 978-1-135-94325-7.
