= Nagina (1951 film) =

- Directed by: Ravindra Dave
- Written by: K. S. Chaudhry
- Produced by: Dalsukh M. Pancholi
- Starring: Nutan; Nasir Khan
- Cinematography: M. N. Malhotra
- Edited by: Dharamvir
- Music by: Shankar–Jaikishan
- Production company: Pancholi Productions
- Release date: 1951
- Country: India
- Language: Hindi

Nagina is an Indian Hindi suspense thriller film directed by Ravindra Dave, released in 1951 under Pancholi Productions. The film stars Nutan and Nasir Khan in lead roles. Nutan's performance in it gained her greater recognition. The film became a commercial success. Nutan was aged 15 at the time of its release, and was thus not allowed to attend its premiere as it was certified "A": (restricted for adults) and she was underage.

== Plot ==
When Shreenath's father is accused of murder, he disappears. Twenty years later, he is believed to be dead, and Shreenath attends the crime scene to find out what happened and possibly clear his father's name. There he meets Mukta, a young and beautiful woman, at a mysterious ancient mansion.

== Cast ==
- Nutan ... Mukta
- Nasir Khan ... Shreenath Chaudhury (as Nasir)
- Bipin Gupta ... Raiji
- Hiralalb... Nihal
- Mohana ... Lily
- Goldstein ... Goonga
- Gope ... Dixit
- Shyamlal ... Shyamlal Chaudhury (as Shamlal)
- Michael ... Lilly's Father

== Music ==
The soundtrack was composed by Shankar–Jaikishan. The film introduced singer C. H. Atma. Author Bradley Shope noted the soundtrack for its jazzy style. The soundtrack marked the first job by Goan music arranger Sebastian D'Souza, who replaced Sunny Castelino halfway through production. He was noted for his "dance-band arranging skills".

Song	Singer(s)	Lyricist
"My (5) Dear Aao (6) Near Aao Mummy Nahin Daddy Nahin Koi Nahin Ghar..."	Shamshad Begum & Mohammed Rafi	Shailendra
"Humse Koi Pyaar Karo Ji Yep-(3) Ek Baar Karo Ji..."	Mohammed Rafi & Lata Mangeshkar	Shailendra
"Tune Haaye Mere Zakhm-e-Jigar Ko Chhoo Liya..."	Lata Mangeshkar	Shailendra
"Ek Sitara Hai Aakash Mein..."	C. H. Atma	Shailendra
"Roun Mein Saagar Ke Kinare, Saagar Hansi Udaaye..."	C. H. Atma	Shailendra
"Dil Beqarar Hai, Mera Dil Beqarar Hai..."	C. H. Atma	Hasrat Jaipuri
"Kaisi Khushi Ki Hai Raat..."	Lata Mangeshkar	Hasrat Jaipuri
"Yaad Aayi Hai Beqasi Chhayi Hai..."	Lata Mangeshkar	Hasrat Jaipuri

== Release and reception ==
The film did well at the box office and, according to Box Office India, was among the ten highest-grossing Indian films of the year. Its success consolidated Nutan's position as a rising star. Nutan, accompanied by Shammi Kapoor, went to attend the premiere but could not enter the theatre to watch the film as she was underage. According to Amjad Parvez, the film is memorable for Nasir Khan's appearance. Author Ashok Raj noted Khan's work in this film alongside a popular actress as a highlight in his career. A 1964 issue of Film World magazine considered the film one of Nutan's most notable films. Author and film critic Dinesh Raheja considered the film an adults-only film and included it in his list of Nutan's "landmark films". According to The Tribune, Nutan was written off for her frail looks. According to author Jagdish Bhatia, in his book Celebrities: A Comprehensive Biographical Thesaurus of Important Men and Women in India, director Dave "took the cine world with storm" with this film, which, "under his supervision, very suspense subject treated so slickly well photographed".

== Sources ==
- Bhatia, Jagdish (1952). Celebrities: A Comprehensive Biographical Thesaurus of Important Men and Women in India. Aeon.
- Booth, Gregory D. (13 October 2008). Behind the Curtain: Making Music in Mumbai's Film Studios. Oxford University Press. ISBN 978-0-19-029624-7.
- Gahlot, Deepa (4 February 2011). Shammi Kapoor: Legends of Indian Cinema. SCB Distributors. ISBN 978-81-8328-228-4.
- Booch, Harish S.; Doyle, Karing (1962). Star-portrait: Intimate Life Stories of Famous Film Stars. Lakhani Book Depot.
- Dawar, Ramesh (2006). Bollywood: Yesterday, Today, Tomorrow. Star Publications. ISBN 978-1-905863-01-3.
- Raheja, Dinesh; Kothari, Jitendra (1996). The Hundred Luminaries of Hindi Cinema. India Book House Publishers. ISBN 978-81-7508-007-2.
- Raj, Ashok (1 November 2009). Hero Vol.1. Hay House, Inc. ISBN 978-93-81398-02-9.
- Rajadhyaksha, Ashish; Willemen, Paul (10 July 2014). Encyclopedia of Indian Cinema. Routledge. ISBN 978-1-135-94318-9.
- Shope, Bradley (2016). American Popular Music in Britain's Raj. Boydell & Brewer. ISBN 978-1-58046-548-9.
- Slobin, Mark (29 September 2008). Global Soundtracks: Worlds of Film Music. Wesleyan University Press. ISBN 978-0-8195-6882-3.
