= Honey Irani =

Indian actress and screenwriter

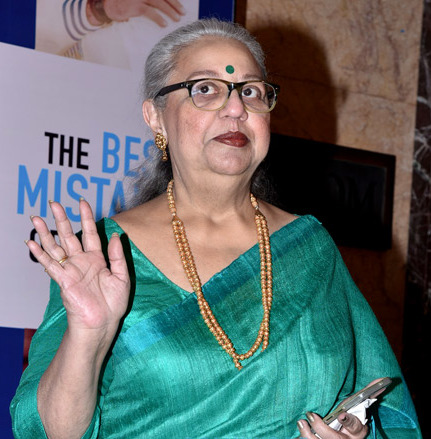
- Honey Irani in 2018
- Born: Bombay, Bombay State, India
- Occupations: Actress, screenwriter
- Spouse: Javed Akhtar (m. 1972; div. 1985)
- Children: Zoya Akhtar; Farhan Akhtar
- Relatives: Daisy Irani (sister); Farah Khan (niece); Sajid Khan (nephew)

Honey Irani is an Indian actress and screenwriter, who works in Hindi cinema. She started her career as a child actor with roles in films such as Mahesh Kaul’s Pyar ki Pyas. She was four to five years old when the shooting of the movies Chirag Kahan Roshni Kahan and Bombay Ka Chor started.

== Background and personal life ==
Honey Irani is the youngest of five siblings, the others being Menaka, Bunny, Sarosh, and Daisy Irani. Her oldest sister, Menaka, was married to stunt film-maker Kamran Khan. Her other sister Daisy, who was also a famous child-star, is the widow of screenwriter K.K. Shukla.

Irani met script-writer and poet Javed Akhtar on the sets of Seeta Aur Geeta. They were married on 21 March 1972. Their children are filmmakers Zoya Akhtar and Farhan Akhtar. Zoya was born on 14 October 1972, when her career as a child star had already ended and Javed's career as a script-writer had not yet taken off. Farhan was born in 1974. Irani became a devoted home-maker, but the marriage ended in divorce after her husband became involved with Shabana Azmi in the mid-1970s. The couple separated in 1978 and divorced in 1985. While Akhtar married Shabana Azmi in 1984, Irani devoted herself to the care of her two young children, who were six years and four years old, respectively, in 1978. Eventually, she managed to make a second career for herself as a writer of film scripts. Both of Irani's children grew up to be successful filmmakers in the Hindi film industry.

== Career ==
Honey Irani began her Bollywood career as a child actress with roles in films such as Chirag Kahan Roshni Kahan and Bombay Ka Chor. She has acted in over 72 films.

After her divorce, she started doing embroidery on sarees to support her family. Though she had been writing short stories all this while, she never shared them. She narrated the story idea of Aaina (1993) to Pam Chopra, wife of Yash Chopra for a TV series, but he developed it into a film. Yash had also previously asked her to develop a story idea, which went on to become her debut as a screenwriter, Lamhe (1991), starring Sridevi. The film saw critical success, and she won the Filmfare Award for Best Story for the film. It paved the way for a successful career as screenwriter. Both Aaina and Lamhe strengthened her bond with Yash who gave her his next film Darr (1993). However she parted ways with the banner when she was not given credit for her work on Dilwale Dulhania Le Jayenge. She won the award again for Kya Kehna and also the Filmfare Award for Best Screenplay award with Ravi Kapoor for the blockbuster Kaho Naa... Pyaar Hai in 2001.

== Awards ==
Year	Film	Award	Category	Result
1992	Lamhe	Filmfare Award	Filmfare Award for Best Story	Won
2001	Kya Kehna	Filmfare Award	Filmfare Award for Best Story	Won
2001	Kaho Naa... Pyaar Hai	Filmfare Award	Filmfare Award for Best Screenplay	Won

== Partial filmography ==
=== Screenwriter ===
- Krrish 3 (2013)
- Har Pal (2007)
- Awaarapan (2007), screenplay and story
- Krrish (2006), screenplay
- Koi... Mil Gaya (2003), screenplay
- Armaan (2003), screenplay and story
- Albela (2001)
- Kya Kehna (2000)
- Kaho Naa... Pyaar Hai (2000), screenplay
- Laawaris (1999), screenplay and story
- Jab Pyaar Kisise Hota Hai (1998), screenplay and story
- Aur Pyaar Ho Gaya (1997), story
- Suhaag (1994), screenplay
- Darr (1993), screenplay and story
- Aaina (1993), screenplay and story
- Parampara (1993), screenplay and story
- Lamhe (1991), screenplay and story

=== Actor ===
- Seeta Aur Geeta (1972) as Sheila
- Amar Prem (1971)
- Kati Patang (1970) as Manorama ("Munni")
- Chandi Ki Deewar (1964)
- Bombay Ka Chor (1962)
- Soorat Aur Seerat (1962)
- Amar Rahe Yeh Pyar (1961)
- Chirag Kahan Roshni Kahan (1959)
- Qaidi No. 911 (1959)
- Pyar ki Pyas (1961) as Geeta
- Zameen Ke Tare (1960)
- Masoom (1960)

=== Director ===
- Armaan (2003)
