= Seema (1955 film) =

1955 film

- Directed by: Amiya Chakravarty
- Written by: Amiya Chakrabarty (screenplay, story); Chandrakant (dialogue)
- Produced by: Amiya Chakrabarty
- Starring: Nutan; Balraj Sahni; Shubha Khote; Santosh Kumar (actor)
- Cinematography: V. Babasaheb
- Edited by: D. B. Joshi
- Music by: Shankar Jaikishan
- Release date: 1955
- Country: India
- Language: Hindi

Seema (English: limit, horizon) is a 1955 Bollywood film starring Balraj Sahni and Nutan, and directed by Amiya Chakravarty. The film earned high critical acclaim to female lead Nutan, who won her first Filmfare Award for Best Actress for her performance in the film.

== Plot ==
After her parents pass away, teenager Gauri goes to live with her paternal uncle, Kashinath, and his wife. She is ill-treated there, made to do all the housework, and verbally abused by her aunt. She is made to work as a servant for meager wages in another household, and her earnings are taken away by her aunt. One day, Kashinath is summoned to the Police Station where he is told that since Gauri has been convicted of stealing a necklace from her employer, she is placed under his care for 12 months. Kashinath undertakes to look after her, but she manages to escape, and beats up Bankelal, who had originally accused her of stealing the necklace. The Police are summoned again, and this time Gauri is placed with Shree Satyanand Anathalaya, an orphanage run by a compassionate Manager, Ashok. Gauri revolts against all the rules imposed upon her and she is placed in solitary, where she ends up breaking all the windows and furniture. Then one day she escapes, beats up Bankelal severely, and returns. She is once again placed in solitary. Then Ashok and his associate Murlidhar find out that Bankelal had framed Gauri, and they inform the Police, who make Bankelal confess. In this way, Gauri gets a pardon, and is asked to leave the orphanage, but she refuses to do so and stays on after promising that she will always obey Ashok. When Ashok has a heart attack, she proposes to stay and look after him, but Ashok wants her to leave and marry Murlidhar. The question remains, will Gauri disobey Ashok or keep her promise and marry Murlidhar?

== Cast ==
- Nutan - Gauri
- Balraj Sahni - Ashok 'Babuji'
- Sunder- Murlidhar
- Pratima Devi - Superintendent "Didi"
- C. S. Dubey - Banke Lal
- Shivraj - Kashinath
- Seema Shah - Pradmiaven
- Krishnakant - Radha's husband
- Praveen Paul - Mrs. Kashinath
- Shubha Khote - Putli
- Jagdish Raj - Doctor
- Santosh Kumar (actor)

== Soundtrack ==
All the songs were composed by Shankar Jaikishan and lyrics were penned by Hasrat Jaipuri and Shailendra.

#	Title	Singer(s)	Lyricist	Duration	Raga
1	"Tu Pyar Ka Sagar Hai, Teri Ik Boond Ke Pyaase Hum"	Manna Dey	Shailendra	05:22	Darbari, with Desi
2	"Kahaan Jaa Raha Hai Tu Aye Jane Wale"	Mohammed Rafi	Shailendra	04:26	
3	"Man Mohana Bade Jhoothe"	Lata Mangeshkar	Shailendra	04:09	Jaijaiwanti
4	"Ye Duniya Gham Ka Mela Hai" (Hame Bhi De Do Sahara, Ke Besahare Hain)	Mohammed Rafi	Hasrat Jaipuri	04:19	
5	"Baat Baat Me Rutho Na"	Lata Mangeshkar	Hasrat Jaipuri	04:08	
6	"Suno Chhoti Si Gudiya Ki Lambi Kahani" (Happy)	Lata Mangeshkar	Hasrat Jaipuri	02:40	Bhairavi
7	"Suno Chhoti Si Gudiya Ki Lambi Kahani" (Sad)	Lata Mangeshkar	Hasrat Jaipuri	05:45	Bhairavi

== Awards ==
- 1956: Filmfare Best Actress Award: Nutan
- 1956: Filmfare Best Story Award: Amiya Chakrabarty
