= Ghunghat (1960 film) =

- Poster
- Directed by: Ramanand Sagar
- Written by: Noukadubi by Rabindranath Tagore
- Produced by: S. S. Vasan
- Starring: Bharat Bhushan; Pradeep Kumar; Bina Rai; Asha Parekh
- Music by: Ravi; Shakeel Badayuni (lyrics)
- Release date: 1960
- Country: India
- Language: Hindi

Ghunghat is a 1960 Hindi drama movie directed by Ramanand Sagar and produced by S.S. Vasan from Gemini Studios.

The film stars Bharat Bhushan, Pradeep Kumar, Bina Rai, Asha Parekh, Leela Chitnis, Rajendranath, Rehman and Agha. It is an adaptation of Rabindranath Tagore's 1906 Bengali story Noukadubi (The Wreck). The film's music is by Ravi, while the songs were penned by Shakeel Badayuni. The film became a hit at the box office. Musically also, it was liked by the audience. "Laage Na Mora Jiya" and "Mori Chham Chham Baje Payaliya" sung by Lata Mangeshkar were hit songs from the film.

At the 8th Filmfare Awards, Bina Rai won the Filmfare Award for Best Actress for her performance in Ghunghat.

== Cast ==
- Bharat Bhushan as Dr. Gopal
- Pradeep Kumar as Ravi
- Bina Rai as Parvati / Jamna
- Asha Parekh as Laxmi
- Rehman as Manohar
- Minoo Mumtaz as Saroj
- Agha as Ram Swaroop
- Leela Chitnis as Laxmi's Mother
- Kanhaiyalal as Saroj's Father
- Rajendranath as Lali
- Helen as Dancer
- Pratima Devi as Gopal's Mother

== Songs ==
Song	Singer
"Lage Na Mora Jiya"	Lata Mangeshkar
"Pat Rakho Girdhari"	Lata Mangeshkar
"Mori Chham Chham Baje"	Lata Mangeshkar
"Insan Ki Majbooriyan"	Mohammed Rafi
"Yeh Zindagi Ka Mausam Aur Yeh Sama Suhana"	Mohammed Rafi, Asha Bhosle
"Do Nain Mile, Do Phool Khile"	Mahendra Kapoor, Asha Bhosle
"Kya Kya Nazaray Dikhati Hai Ankhiyan"	Mahendra Kapoor, Asha Bhosle
"Gori Ghunghat Mein"	Asha Bhosle
"Dil Na Kahin Lagana"	Asha Bhosle
"Ja Ri Sakhi Saj Dhajke"	Asha Bhosle

Two songs are set in Hindustani ragas: "Mori Chham Chham Baje" ([[Bhairavi (Hindustani)|Bhairavi]]) and "Lage Na Mora Jiya" (Shivaranjani).

== Awards and nominations ==
The film created an upset at the 8th Filmfare Awards when it won the Filmfare Award for Best Actress for Rai instead of Madhubala, who gave a critically acclaimed performance in Mughal-e-Azam (1960). The Hindu severely criticized Filmfare for its selection.

- Filmfare Award for Best Actress—Bina Rai
- Nominated - Filmfare Award for Best Supporting Actor—Agha
