= Chhabili =

1960 film

- Directed by: Shobhna Samarth
- Produced by: Shobhna Samarth
- Starring: Nutan; K. N. Singh; Tanuja; Helen; Agha; Iftekhar
- Music by: Snehal Bhatkar
- Release date: 1960
- Country: India
- Language: Hindi

Chhabili is 1960 Hindi drama film directed by Shobhna Samarth under the banner of Shobhana Pictures. The film was made by Samarth to launch her daughter Tanuja.

== Cast ==
- Nutan
- K. N. Singh
- Tanuja
- Helen
- Agha
- Iftekhar
- Kaysi Mehra

== Music ==
Music and soundtrack for the film were by Snehal Bhatkar. The song "Lahron Pe Laher" is based on the Dean Martin song "The Man Who Plays the Mandolin", itself based on the Italian song "Guaglione". The film has following tracks:

#	Title	Singer(s)	Duration
1	"Ae Mere Hamsafar"	Nutan	3:06
2	"Lahron Pe Laher"	Hemant Kumar, Nutan	3:02
