= Manzil (1960 film) =

- Poster
- Directed by: Mandi Burman
- Written by: Vrajendra Gaur
- Produced by: Kalpana Pictures
- Starring: Dev Anand; Nutan; Achala Sachdev; K.N. Singh; Pratima Devi; Krishan Dhawan; Mehmood
- Cinematography: Nariman A. Irani
- Edited by: Dharamvir
- Music by: S.D. Burman
- Release date: 1960
- Country: India
- Language: Hindi

Manzil (lit. 'Destination') is a 1960 Bollywood film directed by Mandi Burman. It stars Dev Anand and Nutan, Krishan Dhawan, Achala Sachdev and K.N. Singh. Boxofficeindia.com declared it an "average" grosser.

== Plot ==
Set in Simla in 1929, Rajkumar Mehta, or Raju as he is lovingly called, has just returned from England. He meets his childhood friend Pushpa, and tells her about the situation at home. Raju's father Mehta wanted him to continue with the family business, but Raju ended up learning music instead. This leads to constant tiffs between the two, as Mehta considers music a profession for beggars. Raju doesn't show it, but he is in love with Pushpa, and she loves him back. More trouble stirs when Captain Prem Nath expresses his will to marry Pushpa.

Raju and Pushpa go to a bar one night, and meet the Captain there. The Captain doesn't recognize Raju, and Raju starts playing on the piano, evidently jealous. Pushpa somehow convinces the Captain to go away, and the two sing Aye Kash Chalte Milke. A few days later, when the Captain comes visiting, (Pushpa is staying in Raju's house), he recognizes Raju, and says that when he saw him play the piano at the bar, he thought Raju was the bandmaster. Mehta hears this and is enraged. A few hours later, Raju comes out of his room, only to see his piano being thrown out. In a fit of rage, Raju leaves the house for Bombay.

Pushpa tries to convince him not to go, but Raju leaves anyway, and promises to take her along when he becomes successful. In Bombay, Raju struggles to find accommodation, and a tourist guide he meets ends up robbing him. Thankfully, the paan-seller offers him a room, and a wealthy prostitute Titlibai comes looking for Raju. She takes him to her house, impressed by his performance, and tries to woo him. Raju slowly starts to find success, but resists Titlibai's advances towards him. Embittered, Titlibai destroys the letters between Raju and Pushpa.

One day, Pushpa's mother, asks her brother Mangal to check up on Raju. Mangal comes back and tells Pushpa that he saw Raju in the company of a prostitute. Pushpa refuses to believe her uncle and goes to Bombay, only to see the same. Shattered, she returns and marries the Captain.

Finally, Raju becomes successful, and after composing the music score for a film, returns to Simla, only to see Pushpa getting married. His sister, Shoba Mehta sees him, and Raju is shocked when she tells him that Pushpa saw him with Titlibai and thought she had lost him for good. Raju becomes an alcoholic, and doesn't care for his newfound wealth or fame. Pushpa, too, is unhappy with her marriage, because she still loves Raju, but tries to be faithful to her husband.

Raju finally meets Pushpa, and denies having any relationship with Titlibai. Before Pushpa can say anything, the Captain finds them together. Believing that Pushpa was cheating on him, he draws a gun and tries to shoot Raju. Will the Captain succeed or will the two lovers be united?

== Cast ==
- Dev Anand as Rajkumar Mehta "Raju"
- Nutan as Pushpa
- K. N. Singh as Mr. Mehta
- Achala Sachdev as Shobha Mehta
- Mehmood as Shankar Paanwala

== Music ==
The music was composed by S.D. Burman. The lyrics were penned by Majrooh Sultanpuri.

Manzil

Studio album by Sachin Dev Burman
- Released: 1960
- Genre: Feature film soundtrack
- Label: Saregama
- Producer: Sachin Dev Burman

=== Songs ===
Song	Singer	Raga
"Yaad Aa Gayi Woh" - 1	Hemant Kumar	
"Yaad Aa Gayi Woh" - 2	Hemant Kumar	
"Hato, Kaahe Ko Jhuthi"	Manna Dey	Bhairavi
"Humdum Se Gaye"	Manna Dey	
"Ae Kaash Chalte Milke Yeh Teen Rahi Dil Ke"	Asha Bhosle, Manna Dey	
"Dil To Hai Deewana Na, Manega Bahana Na, Ruk Jana"	Asha Bhosle, Mohammed Rafi	
"Chupke Se Mile Pyase Pyase Kuch Hum, Kuch Tum"	Geeta Dutt, Mohammed Rafi	
