= Chandan (film) =

1958 film

- Directed by: M. V. Raman
- Produced by: Fali Mistry
- Starring: Kishore Kumar; Nutan; Mala Sinha
- Music by: Madan Mohan
- Production company: Dossi Films
- Release date: 1958
- Country: India
- Language: Hindi

Chandan is a 1958 Hindi-language drama film directed by M. V. Raman, starring Kishore Kumar, Nutan and Mala Sinha.

== Cast ==
- Kishore Kumar
- Nutan
- Mala Sinha
- Pran
- Johny Walker

== Soundtrack ==
Song	Singer
"Bhare Pade Hai"	Kishore Kumar
"Bada Hi CID Hai"	Mohammed Rafi
"Log Kahe Mere Nain Bawre"	Lata Mangeshkar
"Aankh Milane Ke Liye"	Geeta Dutt
"Jab Thoda Thoda"	Asha Bhosle
"Chahe Lakh Zamana Roke"	Asha Bhosle
"Sun Radha, Mohan Tera Kala"	Asha Bhosle

== Awards ==
1959 Filmfare Award for Best Sound Design – Ishan Ghosh
