= Chhalia =

1960 film

- Chhalia movie poster
- Directed by: Manmohan Desai
- Written by: Inder Raj Anand
- Based on: "White Nights" (short story) by Fyodor Dostoyevsky
- Produced by: Subhash Desai
- Starring: Raj Kapoor; Nutan; Pran; Rehman; Shobhna Samarth
- Cinematography: N. Satyen
- Music by: Kalyanji Anandji
- Release date: 1960
- Running time: 135 Minutes
- Country: India
- Language: Hindi

Chhalia is a 1960 Indian Hindi-language drama film directed by Manmohan Desai. It stars Raj Kapoor, Nutan, Pran, Rehman and Shobhna Samarth. The story is loosely based on the 1848 short story "White Nights" by Fyodor Dostoyevsky, but is focused on the issue of estranged wives and children in the aftermath of partition. Chhalia was shot in black-and-white. Music by Kalyanji-Anandji, played a part in the film's box office success.

== Plot ==
Shanti is married off to Kewal on the eve of partition. But while the two families move away to Delhi from Lahore, she inadvertently is left behind, and is forced to share a roof with the Afghan bandit Abdul Rehman, who has a sister of Shanti's age in India. When she returns to India five years later with her son, she is first welcomed by her husband, Kewal, with open arms but disowned when the child identifies himself as Anwar, and his father as Abdul Rehman. Even her own father refuses to give her shelter, though in the years she had lived with Abdul Rehman she hadn't even seen his face.

Physically and emotionally shattered, Shanti tries to commit suicide after leaving Anwar in a remand home, but is rescued by an outlaw, Chhalia who as time and events progress, flips for the lady. Rehman lands in Delhi to settle old scores with Chhalia and threatens to kidnap Shanti. The bloody fight that ensues between the two adversaries eventually ends in a truce. The hurried climax, set amidst Dussera festivities, has Chhalia bringing about a rapprochement between the estranged couple, Shanti and Kewal, and himself walking into infinity, while Rehman is reunited with his sister on the return train.

== Cast ==
- Raj Kapoor as Chhalia
- Nutan as Shanti
- Pran as Abdul Rehman
- Rehman as Kewal
- Bupet Raja as Anwar
- Shobhana Samarth as Shanti's mother

== Production ==
Chhalia was the debut film of director Manmohan Desai. Chhalia was amongst the first of the lost-and-found-formula films that Desai went on to chisel to perfection, the most popular being Amar Akbar Anthony (1977) (except perhaps his last two Ganga Jamuna Saraswati and Toofan), Chhalia was also first amongst his 13 star-studded films out of a total of 20 that Desai churned out in a career spanning 29 years. Laxmikant Pyarelal were the assistant music directors; who went on to be music directors for most of Manmohan Desai's films.

== Soundtrack ==
Chhalia

Soundtrack album by Kalyanji-Anandji
- Released: 1960
- Genre: film soundtrack
- Length: 28:31
- Language: Hindi
- Label: EMI

Kalyanji-Anandji chronology
Dil Bhi Tera Hum Bhi Tere (1960)	Chhalia (1960)	Payaase Panchhi (1961)

The soundtrack of Chhalia is composed by the duo Kalyanji-Anandji with lyrics by Qamar Jalalabadi. The initial vinyl ep release of the soundtrack by Angel Records consisted of 4 songs sung by singers Mukesh and Lata Mangeshkar. The complete soundtrack was released by EMI with 3 new songs and an Instrumental added to the initial soundtrack. Chhalia is considered a landmark in the career of Kalyanji-Anandji. The duo composed the kind of folksy, simple tunes that had come to be associated with Raj Kapoor's collaborations with Shankar-Jaikishan. The songs "Dum Dum Diga Diga" and "Chhalia Mera Naam" are still popular today.

All lyrics are written by Qamar Jalalabadi; all music is composed by Kalyanji-Anandji.

Original vinyl track listing
No.	Title	Singer(s)	Length
1.	"Baje Payal Chhun Chhun"	Lata Mangeshkar	3:48
2.	"Chhalia Mera Naam"	Mukesh	3:51
3.	"Dum Dum Diga Diga"	Mukesh	3:14
4.	"Teri Rahon Mein Khade Hai"	Lata Mangeshkar	3:58
5.	"Meri Jaan Kuchh Bhi Kijiye"	Mukesh & Lata Mangeshkar	3:13
6.	"Mere Toote Huye Dil Se"	Mukesh	4:00
7.	"Gali Gali Sita Roye"	Mohd. Rafi	4:56
8.	"Title Music"	Instrumental	1:32
Total length:			28:31

== Release ==
Chhalia was released in 1960 and was a moderate box office success. Raj Kapoor and Nutan were nominated for 1961 Filmfare Awards in the category of Best Actor and Best Actress respectively. Chhalia was made available on DVD from the Indian distributor Shemaroo and the international firm Baba Digital.

== Awards and nominations ==
8th Filmfare Awards (Nominations)

- Filmfare Award for Best Actor for Raj Kapoor
- Filmfare Award for Best Actress for Nutan
