= Kohinoor (1960 film) =

Indian action adventure film

- Directed by: S. U. Sunny
- Produced by: V. N. Sinha
- Starring: Dilip Kumar; Meena Kumari; Leela Chitnis
- Edited by: Moosa Mansoor
- Music by: Naushad
- Release date: 6 May 1960
- Running time: 151 minutes
- Country: India
- Language: Hindi
- Box office: 1.5 crore

Kohinoor is a 1960 Bollywood action adventure film produced by V. N. Sinha and directed by S. U. Sunny. The film stars Dilip Kumar, Meena Kumari, Leela Chitnis and Kumkum. The film's music is by Naushad. A huge box-office success, it was the third-highest grossing Indian film of 1960.

The film was a blockbuster at the box office in India.

It is said that Dilip Kumar went into depression after playing tragic roles in films such as Devdas (1955) and his psychiatrist recommended to him to do light roles. One such role that he took up was Kohinoor. Kohinoor cast Dilip Kumar and Meena Kumari to play a prince and princess of different kingdoms and was full of sword fights, songs and dances. This film is also notable for some rare comical and funny scenes by Meena Kumari, who is otherwise known as the tragedy queen. Its tone was light and it lacked the intense characterizations of their earlier films.

The film included the melodic songs "Madhuban Mein Radhika Nache Re" and "Do Sitaron Ka Zameen Par Hai Milan Aaj Ki Raat".

== Cast ==
- Dilip Kumar - Rajkumar Dhivendra Pratap Chandrabhan
- Meena Kumari - Princess Chandramukhi
- Azim - Surindar Singh
- Bina
- Leela Chitnis - Deewan Veer Singh's Wife & Surindar Singh's Monther
- Jeevan - Rajgarh's Senapati
- Raja Kapur
- Nazir Kashmiri - Deewan Veer Singh
- Kumar - princess Chandramukhi'sFather
- Kumkum - Rajgarh's Raj Nartaki Rajlaxmi
- Rekha Mallick
- Mukri
- Nissar
- Qamar
- M.Y. Shaikh
- Sood
- Tun Tun
- Uma

== Soundtrack ==
Kohinoor

Soundtrack album by Naushad
- Released: 1960
- Genre: Feature film soundtrack

Naushad chronology
Sohni Mahiwal (1958)	Kohinoor (1960)	Mughal-e-Azam (1960)

The well acclaimed soundtrack for the movie was composed by Naushad and lyrics were penned by Shakeel Badayuni. The soundtrack became a cult favourite among music lovers for its soul stirring music compositions. The soundtrack consists of 10 songs, featuring vocals by Mohammed Rafi, Lata Mangeshkar and Asha Bhonsle. The best known song in the soundtrack is Madhuban Mein Radhika Nache Re, a classical dance song, composed on rāga Hamir and sung by Mohammed Rafi.

Track #	Song	Singer(s)	Length	Raag
1	"Madhuban Mein Radhika Nache Re"	Mohammed Rafi, Niyaz Ahmed Khan (Taan picturised on Mukri)	6:02	Hameer
2	"Dil Mein Baji Pyar Ki Shehnaiyan"	Lata Mangeshkar	3:27	
3	"Tan Rang Lo Ji Aaj Man Ranglo"	Mohammed Rafi, Lata Mangeshkar	3:26	
4	"Jadugar Qatil Hazir Hai Mera Dil"	Asha Bhonsle	3:33	
5	"Zara Man Ki Kewadiya Khol"	Mohammed Rafi	3:17	
6	"Chalenge Teer Jab Dil Par"	Mohammed Rafi, Lata Mangeshkar	3:27	
7	"Yeh Kya Zindagi Hai"	Lata Mangeshkar	3:00	
8	"Dhal Chuki Sham-E-Gham"	Mohammed Rafi	3:17	Khamaj
9	"Do Sitaron Ka Zameen Par Hai Milan Aaj Ki Raat"	Lata Mangeshkar, Mohammed Rafi	3:32	Pahari
10	"Koi Pyar Ki Dekhe Jadugari"	Mohammed Rafi, Lata Mangeshkar	3:24	Pahari

== 8th Filmfare Awards ==
Won

- Filmfare Award for Best Actor for Dilip Kumar
- Filmfare Best Editing Award for Moosa Mansoor

Nominated

- Filmfare Award for Best Supporting Actress for Kumkum
