= Gopi Krishna (dancer) =

Indian dancer, actor and choreographer

- Born: 22 August 1935; Calcutta, British India
- Died: 18 February 1994 (aged 58); Bombay, Maharashtra, India
- Occupations: Dancer, actor, choreographer
- Title: Nataraj, Nritya Samrat

Gopi Krishna (22 August 1935 – 18 February 1994) was an Indian Kathak dancer, actor and choreographer. He also studied Bharatnatyam. In 1952, at the age of seventeen, Gopi Krishna became one of the youngest choreographers in Hindi film history when he was hired to choreograph dances.

== Life and career ==
Gopi Krishna was born into a family of kathak dancers. His maternal grandfather Pandit Sukhdev Maharaj was a teacher of Kathak and his aunt Sitara Devi was a Kathak dancer who has performed around the world. When he was 11 years old, Gopi Krishna began training under his grandfather. He also learned from Shambhu Maharaj. In addition to Kathak, Gopi Krishna learned Bharatanatyam from Mahalingam Pillai and Govind Raj Pillai. Despite suffering from chronic asthma he continued to expand his dance repertoire, receiving the title of "Nataraj" (King of Dancers) at the All Bengal Music Conference at the age of 15.

In 1952, 17-year-old Gopi Krishna became one of the youngest choreographers in Hindi film history when he was hired to choreograph dances for Madhubala in Saqi. In 1955, he appeared in his first film Jhanak Jhanak Payal Baaje. In the film he played Girdhar, a talented young dancer whose love for his partner jeopardizes his dancing career. The film was successful mainly due to songs like Nain so nain naahi milao, and helped to revitalize public interest in classical dance. He also choreographed many films like Grahasti (1963), Dastaan, Mehbooba, Umrao Jaan, Naache Mayuri (1986) and The Perfect Murder. During the 1960s and 70s, he toured India's border posts, entertaining soldiers with Sunil Dutt's Ajanta Arts Cultural Troupe. Gopi Krishna later established the Nateshwar Bhavan dance academy and the Nateshwar Nritya Kala Mandir in Khar Mumbai. In 1975 the Indian government awarded him India's fourth highest civilian award, the Padma Shri. He set a world record for the longest continuous Kathak dance at 9 hours and 20 minutes. He also acted as master dancer in 'Na moonh chhupake jiyo' in the BR Chopra film Humraaz and 'Champavati tu aaja' for the Asit Sen film Annadata. Both times he performed with his dance partner of many films, Madhumati. He played the character role of Latturam, Guruji in 1985 Rishi Kapoor and Rajesh Khanna starrer Zamana. He also appeared in a small role in the legendary TV series Mahabharat.

== Birth and death ==
Gopi Krishna was born on 22 August 1935 in Calcutta and died on 18 February 1994, of a heart attack, in Bombay.

== Style ==
Gopi Krishna was an exponent of the Benares Gharana style of Kathak. He incorporated many elements of Kathakali and Bharatnatyam in his dance.

== Personal life ==
Gopi Krishna married Kathak dancer Savitri in 1964. His adopted daughter Shampa Sonthalia was born in 1980. She became a choreographer and dancer as well, placing as the winner in the 5th and 7th season of Jhalak Dikhhla Jaa where she was paired with actor Gurmeet Choudhary and Ashish Sharma respectively.
