= Kanu Desai =

Indian artist (1907–1980)

Kanu Desai, born Kanhaiyalal Hukumatrai Desai, (12 March 1907 – 9 December 1980) was an Indian artist and art director. He contributed to decorative art, drew and designed sets for films, and illustrated several books written by Mahatma Gandhi.

== Life ==
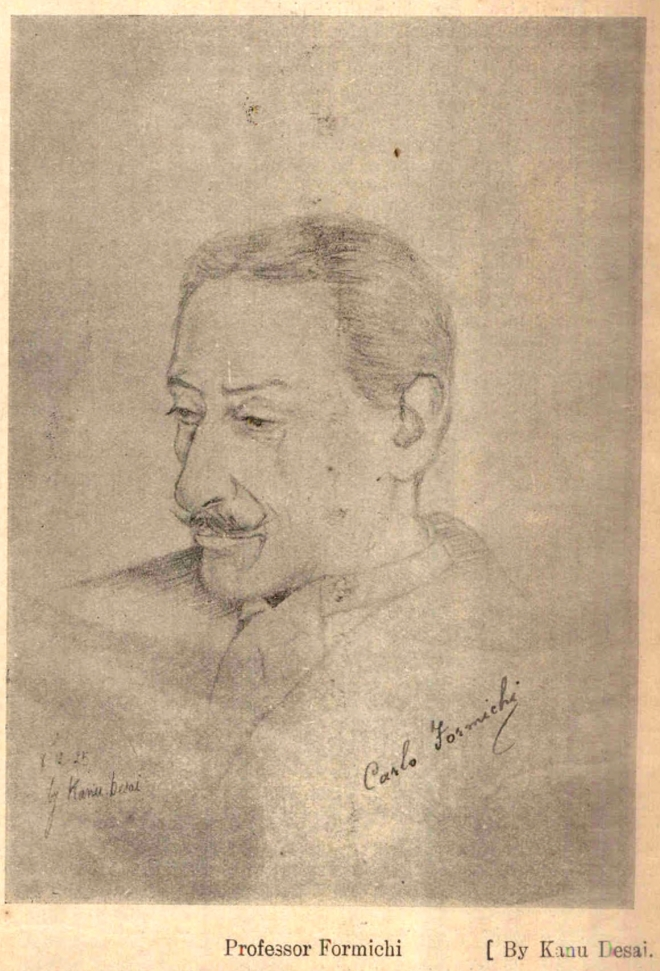
Carlo Formichi by Kanu Desai.

Kanu Desai was born in Bharuch, Bombay Presidency, in 1907. Later his family shifted to his maternal uncle's home in Ahmedabad. In 1920, he volunteered at Indian National Congress session in Ahmedabad addressed by Mahatma Gandhi. He joined Ravishankar Raval to learn art in 1922. He was sent to Shantiniketan to study under Nandalal Bose in 1925 through the scholarship of Gujarat Vidyapith. He was thus influenced by Bose and Rabindranath Tagore. In 1930, he joined Gandhi in Dandi March during which he drew many paintings which recorded the event. Later he started drawing silhouette paintings. In 1937, he participated to decorate INC session at Haripura. His drawings published as romantic albums under Jeevan Mangal and Nritya Manjari titles. After designing coverpages of books, he started designing sets for films in Mumbai. He made plaster casts for the sets in Ram Rajya (1945). He worked as an art director for several films including Baiju Bawra, Navrang, Bharat Milap, Jhanak Jhanak Payal Baaje. He died in 1980.

== Awards ==
He received Ranjitram Suvarna Chandrak, the highest award in Gujarati culture, in 1938. He was also awarded Filmfare Award for Best Art Direction in 1957 for Jhanak Jhanak Payal Baaje. In 1965, he received Gujarat Gaurav Puraskar from Gujarat State Lalit Kala Academy.
