= Zalim Tera Jawab Nahin =

Zallim Tera Jawab Nahin
- Directed by: Ramanlal Desai
- Produced by: G. C. Trivedo
- Music by: Shiv Dayal Batish
- Production company: R. D. Productions
- Release date: 1960
- Country: India
- Language: Hindi

Zallim Tera Jawab Nahin is a 1960 Hindi-language drama and romance film starring Agha, Saroj Khan and Chitra. It is directed by Ramanlal Desai, and produced by G. C. Trivedo for R. D. Productions.

== Cast ==
- Azad
- Chitra
- Agha
- Saroj Khan
- Vasantrao Pahelwan
- Ramial
- Shyam Lal

== Music ==
1. "Sunoji Mohe Dar Lage" – Sudha Malhotra
2. "Gora Na Pade" – Sudha Malhotra, S. D. Batish
3. "Jab Usko Dekha" – Sudha Malhotra
4. "Aaj Mere Yaar Ki Tedhi"
5. "Apne Mann Ka Raju Hu Mai"
6. "Malik Tere Bando Ne Kya" – S. D. Batish
7. "Mere Dildar Vai Vai"

The musical director is S. D. Batish. The lyricists are Shadab, Farid Tonki, and Aziz Siddiqui.
