= Nutan =

Indian actress (1936–1991)

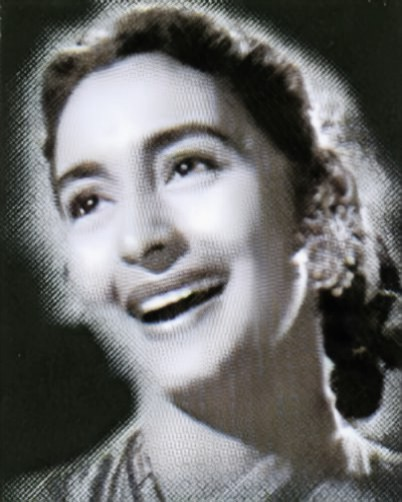
- Born: 4 June 1936; Bombay, Bombay Presidency, British India (present-day Mumbai, Maharashtra, India)
- Died: 21 February 1991 (aged 54); Bombay, Maharashtra, India
- Occupation: Actress
- Years active: 1950–1991
- Spouse: Rajnish Bahl (m. 1959)
- Children: Mohnish Bahl
- Parents: Kumarsen Samarth (father); Shobhna Samarth (mother)
- Relatives: Mukherjee-Samarth family
- Honours: Padma Shri (1974)

Nutan Samarth-Bahl (née Samarth; 4 June 1936 – 21 February 1991), known mononymously as Nutan was an Indian actress who worked in Hindi films. Regarded as one of the finest actresses in the history of Indian cinema, Nutan was noted for her naturalistic acting in parts of conflicted women often deemed unconventional. In a career spanning four decades, she appeared in more than 80 films, that ranged in genre from urban romances to socio-realist dramas. She was the recipient of seven Filmfare Awards, including a then-record five Filmfare Awards for Best Actress. In 1974, Nutan received the Padma Shri, India's fourth highest civilian award.

Born in Bombay to filmmaker Kumarsen Samarth and film actress Shobhna Samarth, Nutan started her career at the age of 14 in the 1950 film Hamari Beti, directed by her mother. She subsequently starred in the films Nagina and Hum Log (both 1951). Her role in Seema (1955) garnered her wider recognition and her first Filmfare Award for Best Actress. She continued playing leading roles through the 1960s until the late 1970s and went onto win the award on four other occasions for her roles in Sujata (1959), Bandini (1963), Milan (1967) and Main Tulsi Tere Aangan Ki (1978). Some of her other films of this period include Anari (1959), Chhalia (1960), Tere Ghar Ke Saamne (1963), Khandan (1965), Saraswatichandra (1968), Anuraag (1972) and Saudagar (1973).

In the 1980s, Nutan started playing character roles and continued working until shortly before her death. She portrayed mostly motherly roles in such films as Saajan Ki Saheli (1981), Meri Jung (1985) and Naam (1986). Her performance in Meri Jung earned her a sixth and final Filmfare Award, in the Best Supporting Actress category. Nutan was married to naval Lieutenant-Commander Rajnish Bahl from 1959 until her death from breast cancer in 1991. Their only child, son Mohnish Bahl is an actor.

== Early life and family ==
Nutan Samarth was born on 4 June 1936 in Bombay into a Marathi Hindu family as the eldest of four children to director-poet Kumarsen Samarth and his actress wife and filmmaker Shobhna. Kumarsen was one of the early developers of the Films Division of India. Her maternal grandmother Rattan Bai and her aunt Nalini Jaywant were also actors. She grew up with complexes as she was considered too skinny in her childhood. She had two sisters: actress Tanuja and Chatura and a brother Jaideep. Her parents separated before Jaideep's birth. Actresses Kajol and Tanishaa Mukerji are Nutan's nieces. Her niece Kajol later shared her record for most Filmfare Best Actress wins.

As a child, Nutan went to Villa Theresa School and was later educated at the Baldwin Girls' High School in Bangalore. While she was attracted to the performing arts since childhood and liked singing and dancing, she liked arithmetic and geography at school. She took lessons in classical music for four years under Jagannath Prasad. In 1953, when her film career had already started, she headed to Switzerland for further studies at La Chatelaine, a finishing school. She was sent there at the behest of her mother following Nutan's intensive work in films and major weight loss. She described the one year spent there as the happiest in her life and returned home a year later having gained 22 pounds.

== Career ==
=== Film debut and early work (1945–1954) ===
Nutan first appeared briefly in front of the camera as a child in her father's film Nal Damyanti in 1945. She started her career at age 14 by playing the protagonist in Hamari Beti (1950), directed by her mother. She was conflicted during the making of the film, unsure she could pull it off given how critical she was of her appearance and talents. She took part in Snehal Bhatkar's soundtrack for the film, singing the song "Tujhe Kaisa Dulha Bhaaye Re". The film released to considerable attention for Nutan's work. The Motion Picture Magazine gave a scathing review of the film but took note of Nutan's "fine performance", which showed "great promise". She recalled an instance where her relatives changed their mind about her after watching the film: "The relatives who called me ugly changed their opinions overnight. They said they were proud of me."

Ravindra Dave's suspense thriller Nagina (1951) followed, and Nutan's performance in the film gained her greater recognition. The film became her first commercial success. Aged 15 at the time of its release, she was not allowed to attend its premiere as it was certified "A: (restricted for adults) and she was underage. The social drama Hum Log, released the same year, was similarly popular with audiences. Directed by Zia Sarhadi, the film dealt with the trials and tribulations of a middle-class family and starred Nutan as the daughter Paro, an aspiring writer who suffers from tuberculosis. Nagina and Hum Log consolidated her position as a rising star.

The following year, she participated at the 1952 Femina Miss India contest, where she was crowned Miss Mussoorie, before being sent to Switzerland for further studies due to her weight loss and frail appearance.

=== Breakthrough, success and stardom (1955–1979) ===
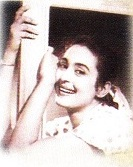
Nutan in Dilli Ka Thug

Her first big break was Seema (1955), for which she won her first Filmfare Award for Best Actress. She followed her success with a romantic comedy, Paying Guest, in which she co-starred with Dev Anand. By the late 1950s she was an established star. In 1959, she starred in two hit films, Anari (with Raj Kapoor) and Bimal Roy's Sujata (with Sunil Dutt), for which she won her second Filmfare Award for Best Actress. In the 1960s and 1970s, she had many more successful films including Chhalia (1960), Saraswatichandra (1968), Devi (1970) and Main Tulsi Tere Aangan Ki (1978).

In 1960, she starred opposite Raj Kapoor once again in Manmohan Desai's Chhalia, which earned her a Filmfare nomination for Best Actress. In a film review at the time, Filmfare wrote: "As the unfortunate girl disowned by her relatives for no fault of hers, Nutan puts over a superb and memorable portrayal."

She formed a popular screen couple with co-star Dev Anand and the two acted in four films together – Paying Guest (1957), Baarish (1957), Manzil (1960) and Tere Ghar Ke Samne (1963).

"Nutan’s masterful performance of a jilted young woman who murders her lover’s wife in Bimal Roy’s classic is arguably the best acting by a lead actress in Indian cinema. Nutan’s genius lay in portraying a whole range of emotions without resorting to over-the-top histrionics. The pièce de résistance is the scene in which her face conveys conflicting sentiments as she is about to commit the murder."

— Forbes India on Nutan's performance in Bandini (1963)

Bimal Roy's socio-realist Bandini (1963) is based on Tamasi, a Bengali novel by Jarasandha, and stars Nutan as Kalyani, a young prisoner convicted for poisoning the wife of her lover (Ashok Kumar). The story follows her life in prison and how she is later faced with a choice between her past love and a young prison doctor (Dharmendra) who falls in love with her. Having quit acting after marriage, Nutan was persuaded to accept the part by Roy, who asserted that he would abandon the project if she refused. She was pregnant during the making of the film.

Bandini was a major critical success, and Nutan received career-best reviews for her portrayal, which is often cited as one of the finest performances of Indian cinema. The film won six awards at the 11th Filmfare Awards, including Best Film and a third Best Actress for Nutan. The Bengal Film Journalists' Association ranked Bandini as the third-best Indian film of the year and acknowledged Nutan with the Best Actress award in its Hindi section. Author and critic Dinesh Raheja wrote: "Sans screaming hysteria-niks, Nutan puts across one of the finest performances seen on Hindi screen. She recognised and was perfectly in tandem with Kalyani's innate strength of character."

In 2010, Filmfare included her performance in its "80 Iconic Performances" list. Anupama Chopra included the film in her list of "The 20 Best Hindi Films Ever Made", calling Kalyani "one of Hindi cinema's most complex and fully realized female characters", which was "the role of a lifetime" for Nutan, whose "face raged with a grand passion and a quiet grace". In 2013, Forbes India listed Nutan's performance as one of the "25 Greatest Acting Performances of Indian Cinema", hailing her work as "the best acting by a lead actress in Indian cinema".

Her fourth Filmfare win came for Milan (1967). She starred opposite Amitabh Bachchan in 1973's Saudagar (1973), for which she received a sixth Filmfare nomination and a third BFJA award. In 1978, she made an astonishing return to the screen as the righteous Sanjukta Chauhan in Main Tulsi Tere Aangan Ki (1978). For this performance, she received an eighth Filmfare nomination and won her fifth Filmfare Award for Best Actress, at the age of 42. She thus became a record holder in the category, having won five awards for Best Actress at Filmfare. At age 42, she is also the oldest winner of the award. Nutan was perhaps the only actress of her generation to command leading roles in her 40s, with tremendous success.

=== Final film roles (1980–1989) ===
Following this, she starred in Saajan Ki Saheli (1981), as an ignorant, jealous wife to a husband who knowingly befriends the daughter she abandoned at childbirth. In the 1980s, she played roles in blockbuster films such as Meri Jung (1985), Naam (1986) and Karma (1986). Karma was notable for being the first time she was paired with actor Dilip Kumar. For Meri Jung, she won the Filmfare Award for Best Supporting Actress. Her last film released while she was alive was Kanoon Apna Apna in 1989. She died in 1991 of cancer. Two of her films Naseebwala (1992) and Insaniyat (1994) were released after her death. She also gave a stellar performance as Kaliganj Ki Bahu in the TV serial Mujrim Hazir, her only role on the small screen. Nutan sang two songs, one in Paying Guest and the other in Chhabili.

== Personal life ==
Nutan married Indian Navy's Lieutenant-Commander Rajnish Bahl on 11 October 1959. Their only son Mohnish, was born on 14 August 1961, who is an established television and film actor. Her son is married to actress Ekta Sohini. His daughter (Nutan's granddaughter) Pranutan Bahl, named after Nutan, is also a film actress. Nutan was fond of hunting. Her husband died from a fire accident in his apartment in 2004.

== Illness and death ==
Nutan was diagnosed and treated for breast cancer in 1990. In February 1991, she was admitted to Breach Candy Hospital in Mumbai after she fell ill. At that time, she was filming Garajna and Insaniyat. She died at 12:07 p.m. (IST) on 21 February 1991.

== Artistry and legacy ==
Nutan is regarded as one of the greatest actors of Indian cinema. She was noted for her willingness to play unconventional roles and several of her roles were labelled "path-breaking". In 2011, Rediff.com listed her as the third-greatest actress of all-time after Nargis and Smita Patil. In 2012, Nutan was placed 10th by NDTV in its "The Most Popular Actress of All Time" list. In 2022, she was placed in Outlook India's 75 Best Bollywood Actresses list. Times of India's placed her in their "50 Beautiful Faces" list. In 2023, journalist Rajeev Masand named her one of Hindi cinema's best actresses of all time.

"Bandini is perhaps Nutan's best role ever. Nutan goes through all the phases of a girl struck by love – the first flush when colour comes to her cheeks upon the mere mention of name, the happiness she feels while playing his pretend-wife. Nutan looks maddened with grief and hatred when she does the acts most foul. Her inner struggle as she reflects between choosing her first love and old is perhaps one the best scenes ever filmed."

— Filmfare on Nutan's performance in Bandini (1963)

Filmfare termed her face "camera-friendly" and said, "Apart from a lissome figure Nutan was gifted with one of the most camera-friendly faces in the industry. One could film her from any angle and it came out perfect." Actresses such as Sadhana and Smita Patil noted Nutan as their influence. Sadhana was once quoted as saying: "If there was any actress I modeled myself in the lines of it was the versatile Nutan in Seema, Sujata and Bandini. Parakh was a film where I really followed Nutan." Filmmaker Sanjay Leela Bhansali said, "They don't make actresses like her anymore." Singer Lata Mangeshkar said that Nutan was an actress who did justice to her voice on screen.

M.L. Dhawan of The Tribune noted, "Nutan fine-tuned her dialogue delivery with an evocative voice. A natural throw was the hallmark of Nutan's dialogue delivery. She was low key and mellow as she was peppery and sarcastic and yet made a strong impact. She either played the main part or at least shared equal footing with the male counterpart." According to Encyclopædia Britannica, Nutan had "developed a natural acting style under Bimal Roy's direction." Arushi Jain of The Indian Express stated, "The actor left an indelible mark on the minds of those who had the fortune of watching her on the silver screen." Shantanu Ray Chaudhuri of The Telegraph noted, "Nutan essayed a range of roles that measured up both critically and as a star." Nutan was known for her nuanced portrayal and for her female characters that stood "shoulder-to-shoulder" with the male characters. Nutan's performance in Bandini was list in "25 Greatest Acting Performances of Indian Cinema" by Forbes. Filmfare's "80 Iconic Performances" list placed her 49th for the same film.

== Filmography ==
Year	Title	Role	Notes
1950	Hamari Beti	Beti	Debut film
1951	Nagina	Mukta	First film as the lead heroine
1951	Hum Log	Paro	
1952	Shisham		
1952	Parbat	Parbat	
1953	Laila Majnu	Laila	
1953	Aagosh	Meera	
1953	Malkin		
1954	Shabab	Ragini	
1955	Seema	Gauri	Won - Filmfare Award for Best Actress
1956	Heer	Heer	
1957	Baarish	Chanda	
1957	Paying Guest	Shanti	
1958	Chandan		
1958	Dilli Ka Thug	Asha	
1958	Kabhi Andhera Kabhi Ujala		
1958	Sone Ki Chidiya	Lakshmi	
1958	Aakhri Dao	Sheila	
1958	Light House		
1958	Zindagi Ya Toofan	Niloufer	
1959	Anari	Aarti Sohanlal	
1959	Kanhaiya	Shanno	
1959	Sujata	Sujata	Won - Filmfare Award for Best Actress
1960	Basant	Meenakshi Rai	
1960	Chhabili		
1960	Chhalia	Shanti	Nominated - Filmfare Award for Best Actress
1960	Manzil	Pushpa	
1962	Soorat Aur Seerat		
1963	Bandini	Kalyani	Won - Filmfare Award for Best Actress
1963	Dil Hi To Hai	Jameela Banu	
1963	Tere Ghar Ke Samne	Sulekha	
1964	Chandi Ki Deewar		
1965	Khandan	Radha	
1965	Rishte Naate	Savitri	
1966	Chhota Bhai	Annapoorna	
1966	Dil Ne Phir Yaad Kiya	Ashoo alias Shabnam	
1967	Dulhan Ek Raat Ki	Nirmala	
1967	Laat Saheb	Nikki	
1967	Milan	Radha	Won - Filmfare Award for Best Actress
1967	Mehrban	Laxmi	
1967	Mera Munna	Seema	
1968	Gauri	Gauri	
1968	Saraswatichandra	Kumud Sundari	
1969	Bhai Bahen	Mala	
1970	Maa Aur Mamta	Maya	
1970	Devi	Devi	
1970	Maharaja	Kamala	
1970	Yaadgaar	Bhavna	
1971	Lagan	Shanti	
1972	Anuraag	Anu Rai	Nominated - Filmfare Award for Best Supporting Actress
1972	Grahan		
1972	Mangetar		
1973	Saudagar	Mahjubi	Nominated - Filmfare Award for Best Actress
1975	Jogidas Khuman		
1976	Zid		
1977	Mandir Masjid		
1977	Jagriti		
1977	Duniyadari	Sushila	
1977	Paradh	Vidya	Marathi film
1978	Ek Baap Chhe Bete	Joyce Fernandes	
1978	Main Tulsi Tere Aangan Ki	Sanjukta Chouhan	Won - Filmfare Award for Best Actress
1978	Saajan Bina Suhagan	Asha Chopra	
1978	Hamara Sansar	Geeta	
1980	Kasturi	Prameela	
1980	Sanjh Ki Bela		
1981	Saajan Ki Saheli	Kunti Kumar	
1982	Teri Maang Sitaron Se Bhar Doon	Kamini 'Lalli'	
1982	Jeeo Aur Jeene Do	Dr. Sita	
1983	Rishta Kagaz Ka	Suman	
1983	Film Hi Film	Indu	Footages of the shelved film Shikhwa (1954) featuring her opposite her, Dilip Kumar and Ramesh Saigal with direction by Ramesh Saigal were used here.
1985	Yudh	Savitri Devi	
1985	Paisa Yeh Paisa	Lakshmi	
1985	Meri Jung	Aarti Verma	Won - Filmfare Award for Best Supporting Actress
1985	Yeh Kaisa Farz		
1985	Pyari Bhabhi		
1986	Sajna Saath Nibhana	Shobha Rana	
1986	Karma	Mrs. Vishwanath Pratap Singh	
1986	Naam	Janaki Kapoor	
1986	Ricky	Seeta	
1987	Hifazat	Lakshmi	
1988	Sone Pe Suhaaga	Usha	
1988	Mujrim Hazir	Kaliganj's daughter-in-law	TV series
1989	Mujrim	Yashoda Bose	
1989	Kanoon Apna Apna	Lakshmi Singh	
1989	Guru	Yashoda Shrivastav	
1990	Aulaad Ki Khatir		
1992	Naseebwala	Sharada	Posthomous release
1992	Deewana Aashiq	Seema	Posthomous release
1994	Insaniyat	Shanti Devi	Posthomous release

== Accolades ==
=== Civilian award ===
Year	Award	Work	Result	Ref.
1974	Padma Shri	Contribution in the field of Arts	Honoured	

=== Filmfare Awards ===
Filmfare Award for Best Actress

Year	Film	Result	Ref.
1957	Seema	Won	
1960	Sujata	Won	
1961	Chhalia	Nominated	
1964	Bandini	Won	
1968	Milan	Won	
1974	Saudagar	Nominated	
1979	Main Tulsi Tere Aangan Ki	Won	

Filmfare Award for Best Supporting Actress

Year	Film	Result	Ref.
1974	Anuraag	Nominated	
1974	Saudagar	Nominated	
1979	Main Tulsi Tere Aangan Ki	Nominated	
1986	Meri Jung	Won	

=== Filmfare Special Award ===
Year	Note	Result
2025	Cine Icon award for her enduring legacy in Hindi cinema	Honoured

=== Bengal Film Journalists' Association Awards ===
BFJA Award for Best Actress (Hindi)

Year	Film	Result	Ref.
1964	Bandini	Won	
1968	Milan	Won	
1974	Saudagar	Won	

== Tributes and honors ==
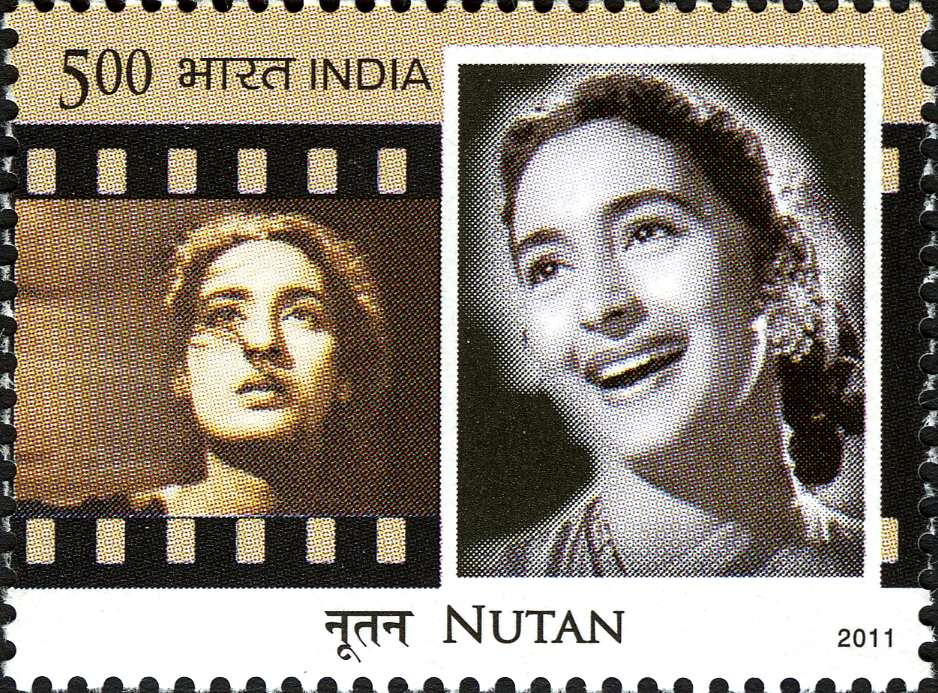
Nutan on a 2011 stamp of India

Nutan's narrative is depicted in the book Nutan – Asen Mi Nasen Mi (meaning 'whether I will exist or not') written by famous Marathi author Lalita Tamhane. Her biography was launched by actress Madhuri Dixit in 2016. In February 2011, a postage stamp, bearing Nutan's photo, was released to honour her by the Government of India. On Nutan's 81st birthday in 2017, Google commemorated her with a Doodle.

Giving her a tribute, singer Lata Mangeshkar said, "If one has to rank the actresses by their acting prowess, the name of Nutan will be at the top." Actress Sonam Kapoor recreated the famous Nutan pose from Saraswatichandra and termed the actress her "favourite". Actress Tara Sutaria termed Nutan "fascinating" and said that her generation misses out on Nutan's "adaa and nazaaqat". Lalit Kumar noted that the actress performed "every role with a certain moral superiority and grace". The Bimal Roy Film and Memorial Society organised a three-day retrospective to mark her 83rd birth anniversary in 2019.

== Bibliography ==
- Booch, Harish S.; Doyle, Karing (1962). Star-portrait: Intimate Life Stories of Famous Film Stars. Lakhani Book Depot.
- Chatterji, Shoma A. (22 May 2017). The Cinema of Bimal Roy: An ′Outsider′ Within. SAGE Publishing India. ISBN 978-93-86062-87-1. Archived from the original on 2 September 2023.
- Chopra, Jaskiran (12 April 2021). "Nutan: A Byword for Natural Acting". Galaxy Golden Stars of the Silver Screen. Idea Publishing. ISBN 978-93-87063-77-8. Archived from the original on 28 February 2022.
- Dawar, Ramesh (2006). Bollywood: Yesterday, Today, Tomorrow. Star Publications. ISBN 978-1-905863-01-3. Archived from the original on 2 September 2023.
- Kiynason, Nic, ed. (October 1999). Guinness World Records 2000. Guinness World Records Limited. ISBN 978-1-892051-00-4.
- Premchand, Manek (27 December 2018). Yesterday's Melodies Today's Memories. Notion Press. ISBN 978-1-64429-877-0. Archived from the original on 2 September 2023.
- Salam, Ziya Us (2012). Houseful The Golden Years of Hindi Cinema. Om Books International. ISBN 978-93-80070-25-4. Archived from the original on 2 September 2023.
- Raheja, Dinesh; Kothari, Jitendra (1996). The Hundred Luminaries of Hindi Cinema. India Book House Publishers. ISBN 978-81-7508-007-2. Archived from the original on 2 September 2023.
- Rajadhyaksha, Ashish; Willemen, Paul (1999). Encyclopedia of Indian Cinema. Routledge. ISBN 978-1-135-94325-7.
