= Soorat Aur Seerat =

- Poster
- Directed by: Rajnish Behl
- Written by: Shailendra (lyrics)
- Starring: Nutan; Dharmendra
- Cinematography: Kishore Rege
- Music by: Roshan
- Release date: 1962
- Country: India
- Language: Hindi

Soorat Aur Seerat (Lit. Character and appearance) is a 1962 Hindi film directed by Rajnish Behl. The film stars Dharmendra, Nutan, K. N. Singh, Iftekar and Asit Sen. The film's music is by Roshan.

== Soundtrack ==
1. "Jaise Court Me Hakim Ki Chale Re" – Asha Bhonsle
2. "Garaj Ho To Nakhare Dikhati Hai Biwi" – Mohammad Rafi
3. "Bahut diya dene wale ne tujhko" – Mukesh

The opening tune of the song "Bahut diya dene wale ne tujhko" inspired the song "Yeh Bandhan Toh" from the Hindi film "Karan Arjun" (1995).

== Production ==
The film is Dharmendra's second film and was directed by Nutan's husband.

== Reception ==
The film has been described as an example of a "soft romantic movie". and a "women oriented film" with Dharmendra in one of his "strong, romantic supporting lead roles." Kiran Kumar wrote that "was not a commercial hit but a good movie".
