= Masoom (1960 film) =

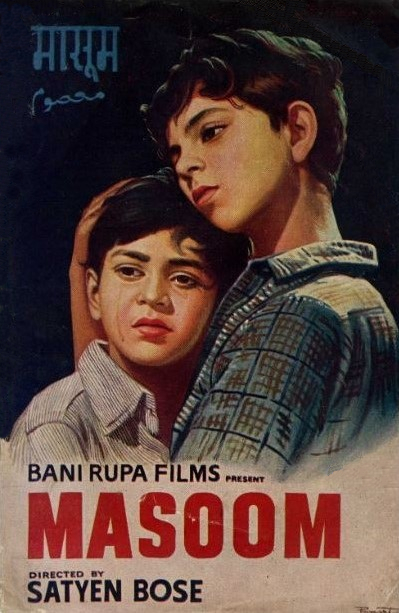
- Directed by: Satyen Bose
- Written by: Ruby Sen
- Starring: Ashok Kumar; Sarosh Irani; Aziz; Honey Irani; Manmohan Krishna; Chaman Puri; Mohan Choti
- Narrated by: Ken Kumar Dass
- Music by: Robin Banerjee; Asst. Music director: Anil Chandra Sengupta
- Release date: 1960
- Running time: 150 minutes
- Country: India
- Language: Hindi
- Budget: ₹630,580

Masoom is a 1960 Indian Hindi-language film directed by Satyen Bose. It stars Ashok Kumar, Sarosh Irani, Honey Irani, Ghanashyam Nayak and Mohan Choti. Screenwriter Ruby Sen won the Filmfare Award for Best Story. It was also nominated for a Filmfare Award for Best Movie. The music, by Robin Banerjee, includes songs such as 'Nani Teri Morni Ko Mor Le Gaye' and 'Humein Un Raahon Par Chalna Hai Jahaan Girna Aur Sambhalna Hai'.

== Cast ==
- Sarosh Irani as Debesh Sharma / Debu
- Aziz as Mohan Sharma / Mannu
- Honey Irani as Tunni
- Manmohan Krishna as Madhavlal Sharma
- Ashok Kumar as Mr. Khan
- Chaman Puri as School Headmaster
- Ghanashyam Nayak as child artist (on screen name given Ghanshyam)
- Gautam as Dr. S K Gupta
- Anubha Gupta as Mrs. Gupta

== Music ==
Music direction by Robin Banerjee.

1. "Tu Prem Nagar Ka Pyara Sadhu" - Sabita Chowdhury, Mohammed Rafi
2. "Desh Ka Pyara" - Asha Bhosle
3. "Hamen Un Raahon Par Chalna Hain" - Subir Sen
4. "Nani Teri Morni Ko Mor Le Gaye" - Ranu Mukherjee
