= List of Hindi films of 1961 =

A list of films produced by the Bollywood film industry based in Mumbai in 1961:

== Highest-grossing films ==
The ten highest-grossing films at the Indian box office in 1961:

Rank	Title	Gross collection
1	Gunga Jumna	₹7 crore
2	Junglee	₹3.5 crore
3	Gharana	₹2.5 crore
4	Aas Ka Panchhi	₹2 crore
5	Jab Pyar Kisi Se Hota Hai	₹1.8 crore
6	Sasural	₹1.7 crore
7	Hum Dono	₹1.6 crore
8	Kabuliwala	₹1.4 crore
9	Zindagi aur Khwab	₹1.2 crore
10	Shola Aur Shabnam	₹1.1 crore

== A-G ==
Title	Director	Cast	Genre	Notes
Aas Ka Panchhi	J. Om Prakash	Rajendra Kumar, Vyjayanthimala	Family Drama	Music by Shankar–Jaikishan
Amar Rahe Yeh Pyar	Prabhu Dayal	Nalini Jaywant, Rajendra Kumar, Nanda, Prabhu Dayal	Drama Family	Music by C. Ramchandra; Lyrics: Kavi Pradeep
Amrit Manthan	S. N. Tripathi	Usha Kiran, Manhar Desai, Sulochana Chatterjee, Ulhas, Ratnamala, Sunder, Yashodhra Katju, Dalpat, Jeevankala, Amirbai Karnataki	Mythology	Music: S. N. Tripathi; Lyrics: B. D. Mishra
Aplam Chaplam	Roop K. Shorey	I. S. Johar, Kumkum, Tiwari	Comedy	Music by Chitragupta
Apsara	B.M. Vyas	Pradeep Kumar, Padmini, Nirupa Roy	Drama	Husnlal Bhagatram
Arab Ka Sitara	R.K. Rehman	Shyam Kumar, Sheela Kashmiri, Kamran	Action	Music by Saadat Khan
Bada Aadmi	Kaushal Raj	Sheikh Mukhtar, Subiraj, Vijaya Choudhry	Action	Chitragupta
Batwara	Karunesh Thakur	Balraj Sahni, Pradeep Kumar, Jabeen, Shashikala	Family Drama	Music by S Madan
Bhabhi Ki Chudiyan	Sadashiv Rao Kavi	Meena Kumari, Balraj Sahni	Family Drama	Sudhir Phadke
Boy Friend	Naresh Saigal	Shammi Kapoor, Dharmendra, Madhubala	Romance	Shankar–Jaikishan
Char Diwari	Krishan Chopra	Shashi Kapoor, Nanda, Manmohan Krishna	Romance Family	Music by Salil Chowdhary
Chhatrapati Shivaji Maharaj	Ram Narayan Gabale			
Chhaya	Hrishikesh Mukherjee	Sunil Dutt, Asha Parekh		Music by Salil Chowdhary
Chhote Nawab	S. A. Akbar	Mehmood, Ameeta, Minoo Mumtaz, Johnny Walker, R. D. Burman	Comedy Romance	Music by Rahul Dev Burman
Dark Street	Naresh Saigal	Ashok Kumar, K.N. Singh, Amirbai Karnataki, Nishi	Action	Music by Dattaram
Dharmputra	Yash Chopra	Shashi Kapoor, Mala Sinha, Rehman, Nirupa Roy, Indrani Mukherjee	Social Family Drama	National Film Award for Best Feature Film in Hindi Music by N.Dutta
Do Bhai	Vishram Bedekar	Shakila, Helen, Abhi Bhattacharya, Om Prakash, Daisy Irani	Family	Music by N.Dutta
Flat No. 9	Ramesh Sharma	Ashok Kumar, Sayeeda Khan, Helen		Music by Usha Khanna
Gharana	S.S. Vasan	Rajendra Kumar, Asha Parekh, Lalita Pawar	Family Drama	Music by Ravi
Gunga Jumna	Nitin Bose	Dilip Kumar, Vyjayanthimala, Nazir Khan	Drama Action	Music by Naushad

== H-O ==
Title	Director	Cast	Genre	Notes
Hamari Yaad Aayegi	Kidar Sharma	Tanuja, Ashok Sharma	Romance Drama	Snehal Bhatkar
Hum Dono	Amarjeet	Dev Anand, Nanda, Sadhna	Drama Family Romance War	Entered into the 12th Berlin International Film Festival Music by Jaidev
Hum Matwaale Naujawaan	L.R. Asthana	Shekhar, Sayeeda Khan, Jeevan, Agha	Drama Family	Chitragupta
Jab Pyar Kisise Hota Hai	Nasir Hussain	Dev Anand, Asha Parekh, Pran	Romance	Music by Shankar–Jaikishan
Jadoo Nagri	Radhakant	Ranjan, Vijaya Choudhary, Jeevan	Fantasy	Music by S.N. Tripathi
Jai Bhawani	Dhirubhai Desai	Jayshree Gadkar, Manhar Desai, Lata Sinha, Veena	Mythology	Music by S. Mohinder
Jai Chittor	Jaswant Jhaveri	Nirupa Roy, Jairaj, Bipin Gupta	Drama History	Music by S.N. Tripathi
Jhumroo	Shanker Mukherjee	Kishore Kumar, Madhubala, Anoop Kumar, Chanchal	Romance Drama	Music by Kishore Kumar
Junglee	Subodh Mukherjee	Shammi Kapoor, Saira Banu, Anoop Kumar, Lalita Pawar, Azra	Romance	Intro: Saira Banu, Music by Shankar- Jaikishan
Kabuliwala	Hemen Gupta	Balraj Sahni, Usha Kiran, Sonu, Baby Farida	Drama	A Bimal Roy Productions, Music by Salil Choudhary
Karorepati	Mohan Sehgal	Kishore Kumar, Kumkum, Anoop Kumar, Shashikala	Comedy, Crime	Music by Shankar–Jaikishan
Kanch Ki Gudiya	H. S. Rawail	Manoj Kumar, Sayeeda Khan, Tarun Bose, Shubha Khote	Drama Family	Music by Suhrid Kar
Khiladi	B.J. Patel	Ranjan, Jabeen, Shammi, Sunder, Tiwari	Action	Sardul Kwatra
Madan Manjri	J. Trivedi	Manhar Desai, Ajit, Nalini Chonker	Fantasy	Sardar Malik
Mahavat	M. A. Thirumugam	Udaykumar, B. Saroja Devi	Drama	Music by Sudharshan. Dubbed from Tamil
Main Aur Mera Bhai	Dharam Kumar	Ajit, Ameeta, Lalita Pawar, Helen	Family Drama	Music by C. Arjun composer
Matlabi Duniya	Radhakant M Thakur	Anant Kumar, Dhumal, Asha	Social	Shashank Banerji
Maya	D.D. Kashyap	Dev Anand, Mala Sinha	Drama Crime Romance	Salil Chowdhury
Memdidi	Hrishikesh Mukherjee	Tanuja, Keysi Mehra, Lalita Pawar, Jayant, David	Drama	Music by Salil Choudhary
Mera Suhaag	Hunsur Krishnamurthy	Nazima, Kanta Rao	Family Drama	Music by Arun Raghavan
Modern Girl	R. Bhattacharya	Pradeep Kumar, Sayeeda Khan, Madan Puri, Iftekhar, Helen	Family Drama	Ravi
Mr. India	G.P. Sippy	Geeta Bali, I. S. Johar, Helen, Feroz Khan	Comedy, Crime	Music by G.S. Kohli
Murad	Nari Ghadiali	Chitra, Asgar, Manju		Hanuman Prasad Triloki
Nazrana	Sridhar	Raj Kapoor, Vyjayanthimala Gemini Ganesan, Usha Kiran	Family Drama	Music by Ravi
Oomar Qaid	Aspi Irani	Sheikh Mukhtiar, Sudhir, Nazima, Mukri, Helen, Sulochana.		Music by Iqbal Qureshi
Opera House	P.L. Santoshi	Ajit, B. Saroja Devi, Lalita Pawar	Crime Thriller Romance	Music by Chitragupta

== P-Z ==
Title	Director	Cast	Genre	Notes
Passport	Pramod Chakravorty	Pradeep Kumar, Madhubala, K.N. Singh	Thriller	Qamar Jalalabadi-Kalyanji Anandji
Piya Milan Ki Aas	S. N. Tripathi	Manoj Kumar, Ameeta	Romance	S. N. Tripathi
Pyaase Panchhi	Harsukh Jagneshwar Bhatt	Mehmood, Leela Mishra Ameeta, Malka, Niranjan Sharma, Uma Khosla, Agha, Jeevan, David	Romance, Comedy	Music by Kalyanji Anandji Assts by Laxmikant–Pyarelal
Pyaar Ka Saagar	Devendra Goel	Rajendra Kumar, Meena Kumari, Madan Puri	Romance, Drama	Music by Ravi
Pyaar Ki Dastan	P.L. Santoshi	Ameeta, Sudesh Kumar, Shubha Khote, Mohan Choti, Helen	Romance	Music by Naushad
Pyaar Ki Pyaas	Mahesh Kaul	Honey Irani, Shrikant, Nishi, Manmohan Krishna	Drama Family	Music by Vasant Desai
Ram Lila	Chandrakant	Abhi Bhattacharya, Jayshree T, Shahu Modak, Leela Chitnis, Tiwari, Anil Kumar, Tun Tun	Mythological	Music by S.N. Tripathi
Razia Sultana	Devendra Goel	Nirupa Roy, Kamran, Jairaj, Agha, Madhumati	Historical Romance	Music by Lachchiram Bhairam
Reshmi Rumal	Harsukh Jagneshwar Bhatt	Manoj Kumar, Shakila, Kamal Kapoor, K. N. Singh, Helen	Romance	Music by Babul
Roop Ki Rani Choron Ka Raja	Harnam Singh Rawail	Dev Anand, Waheeda Rehman, Jeevan, Sunder	Romance	Music by Shankar Jaikishan
Saaya	Shreeram	Nasir Khan, Nigar Sultana, Helen, Chitra, Madan Puri	Family Drama	Music by Ram Ganguly
Salaam Memsaab	Kalpataru	Kumkum, Subbi Raj, K. N. Singh	Thriller, Action, Romance	Music by Ravi
Sampoorna Ramayana	Babubhai Mistry	Mahipal, Anita Guha, Achala Sachdev, Lalita Pawar, Badri Prasad	Mythological	Music by Vasant Desai
Sanjog	Pramod Chakravorty	Pradeep Kumar, Anita Guha, Shubha Khote, Om Prakash	Drama Social Family	Music by Madan Mohan
Sapera	B. J. Patel	Ranjan, Jeevan Kala, Tiwari		Music by Ajit Merchant, Lyrics: Indivar
Sapne Suhane	Kedar Kapoor	Balraj Sahni, Geeta Bali, Chandrashekhar, Kamini Kadam	Romance Drama	Music by Salil Choudhary
Sara Jahan Hamara	Prakash Chabra	Premnath, Shyama, Jankidas, Azra	Crime Action Drama	Music by Babul
Saranga	Dhirubai Desai	Sudesh Kumar, Jayshree Gadkar		
Sasural	T. Prakash Rao	Rajendra Kumar, B. Saroja Devi, Mehmood, Shubha Khote, Dhumal	Family Drama	Music by Shankar Jaikishan
Sati Renuka	Prakash Rao	Jamuna, G. Varalaxmi	Mythological	Music by S. L. Merchant Shreeram, Lyrics by Bharat Vyas
Saugandh	G. K. Ramu	Anjali Devi, Gemini Ganesan, Kamla Laxman, M. N. Nambiar.	Drama	Music by Dilip Dholakia
Savitri	Phani Majumdar		Children's Film	Received All India Certificate of Merit for the Second Best Children's Film
Senapati	Kedar Kapoor	Prithviraj Kapoor, Nalini Jaywant	Costume Drama	Music by Madan Mohan
Shahi Farman	K. Anand	Krishna Kumari, Kamran	Action	Music by Harbans
Shama	Lekhraj Bhakri	Nimmi, Suraiya, Vijay Dutt	Social Drama	Ghulam Mohammed
Shola Aur Shabnam	Ramesh Saigal	Dharmendra, Tarla	Romance Drama	Khayyam
Shola Jo Bhadke	Bhagwan	Kumkum, Purnima, Suresh, Anwar, Bhagwan, Helen	Musical	Music by Nissar
Stree	V. Shantaram	V. Shantaram, Sandhya, Rajshree	Drama	Music by C. Ramchandra
Suhag Sindoor	Krishanan Panju	Balraj Sahni, Mala Sinha, Manoj Kumar	Family Social Drama	Music by Chitragupta
Tanhai	Ram Narayan Gabale	Karan Dewan, Usha Kiran, Purnima, Jagirdar		Music by Mohd. Shafi
Teen Kanya: Tales of Three girls (Bengali)	Satyajit Ray	Chandana Banerjee, Anil Chatterjee, Kali Banerjee, Kumar Roy, Soumitra Chatterjee, Aparna Sen, Gita Dey	Anthology film	Based on short stories by Rabindranath Tagore
Teen Ustad	Nanabhai Bhatt	Suresh, Ameeta, Shammi, Honey Irani	Action Crime Drama	Music by Dilip Dholakia
Tel Malish Boot Polish	Romey Dey	Sheikh Mukhtar, Kumkum, Chandrashekhar, Madan Puri	Action Drama	Music by Chitragupta
Wanted	Nisar Ahmad Ansari	Vijay Kumar, Sayeeda Khan	Action	Music by Ravi
Warrant	Kedar Kapoor	Ashok Kumar, Raaj Kumar, Shakila, Dhumal	Action	Music by Roshan
Wazir-e-Azam	R. S. Rahi	Chand Usmani, Nadira, Indira Billi, Bhagwan, Helen	Adventure, Costume Drama	Music by Robin Banerjee
Zabak	Homi Wadia	Mahipal, Shyama, Chitra	Costume Drama	Chitragupta
Zalim Jadugar	Sultan	Hercules, Neeta, Rajrani	Fantasy, Action	Music by Iqbal
Zamana Badal Gaya	Jayant Desai	Charlie, Chand Usmani, Naina, Iftekhar, Bhagwan, Helen	Social	Music by Iqbal Qureshi
Zindagi aur Khwab	S. Banerjee	Meena Kumari, Rajendra Kumar, Jayant, Agha, Naaz, Pratima Devi, Jeevankala	Romantic melodrama	Music: Dattaram; Lyrics: Kavi Pradeep
