= Abe-Hayat (film) =

1955 Indian Hindi film

- Directed by: Ramanlal Desai
- Produced by: Ramanlal Desai
- Starring: Premnath; Shashikala
- Music by: Sardar Malik
- Distributed by: Filmistan
- Release date: 1955
- Country: India
- Language: Hindi

Abe-Hayat is a 1955 Bollywood film starring Premnath and Shashikala in lead roles.

== Cast ==
- Premnath as Jalal
- Shashikala as Shehzad
- Pran as Aqeel
- Ameeta as Sabz Pari
- Helen as Dancer/Singer

== Soundtrack ==
The film music was composed by Sardar Malik, Hasrat Jaipuri, Qamar Jalalabadi, Raja Mehdi Ali Khan and Kaif Irani.

Song	Singer
"Main Garibon Ka Dil Hoon, Watan Ki Zubaan"	Hemant Kumar
"Jhuki Jhuki Jaye"	Geeta Dutt
"Mera Dil, Meri Jaan"	Geeta Dutt
"Woh Mara Aankhen Katar"	Geeta Dutt
"Ae Dil-E-Nashad Tera Shukriya"	Asha Bhosle
"Aaja Hai Tera Intezar"	Asha Bhosle
"Nachun Re, Gaun Re"	Asha Bhosle
"Tune Pilayi Aisi"	Asha Bhosle
"Nigahen Mili"	Asha Bhosle
