= Jayam Manade =

- Theatrical release poster
- Directed by: T. Prakash Rao
- Written by: Muddu Krishna (dialogues)
- Screenplay by: T. Prakash Rao
- Story by: K. Pratyagatma
- Based on: Baadal by Amiya Chakravarty
- Produced by: Sudarlal Nehatha
- Starring: N. T. Rama Rao; Anjali Devi
- Cinematography: Kamal Ghosh
- Edited by: Tilak
- Music by: Ghantasala
- Production company: Rajasri Productions
- Release date: 4 May 1956
- Running time: 160 minutes
- Country: India
- Language: Telugu

Jayam Manade (transl. Victory is Ours) is a 1956 Indian Telugu-language swashbuckler film directed by T. Prakash Rao and produced by Sundarlal Nahatha. It stars N. T. Rama Rao and Anjali Devi, with music composed by Ghantasala. It is a remake of the 1951 Hindi film Baadal. Jayam Manade was released on May 4, 1956, and became a commercial success. The film was dubbed into Tamil with the title Vetri Veeran.

== Plot ==
In a kingdom where the Emperor is on vacation, the administration is left to the inexperienced and ineffective satrap Mahipathi. Seizing the opportunity, the ruthless chief commander Prachanda usurps authority and oppresses the populace. Among his victims is Rosayya, a retired soldier who is harassed with excessive taxes, leading to his death. Rosayya's son, Pratap, enraged by his father's fate, vows revenge. With the support of his friends Jogulu and Mallika, Pratap infiltrates the fort, defeats Prachanda, and issues a warning.

Pratap then forms a revolutionary group that robs treasuries to give to the poor. Prachanda labels him a bandit and offers a reward for his capture. Meanwhile, Mahipathi's daughter, Sobha, is kidnapped by Jogulu. Pratap, pretending to rescue her from bandits, safely returns her to Mahipathi. During this time, Sobha and Pratap develop feelings for each other. Initially unaware of Pratap's true identity, Sobha despises him when she discovers it, but Mallika helps her understand his noble intentions.

Prachanda, attempting to lure Pratap into a trap, offers a false promise of amnesty. Despite his followers' objections, Pratap surrenders, but Prachanda captures him. A masked figure intervenes and rescues Pratap in a critical moment. The masked figure's actions inspire a public uprising against Prachanda.

As Prachanda plans to seize the throne by marrying the Princess, Pratap tries to stop him but is captured and sentenced to death. On the day of execution, the masked figure leads a successful revolt against the fort. In a twist, the masked figure is revealed to be Sobha. The Emperor returns, restores justice, and declares Pratap as his heir. The film concludes with the marriage of Pratap and Sobha.

== Cast ==
- N. T. Rama Rao as Pratap
- Anjali Devi as Shobha Devi
- R. Nageswara Rao as Prachandudu
- Gummadi as Maharaju
- C.S.R. as Samanta Raju Mahipathi
- Relangi as Joogulu
- Perumallu as Rosaiah
- Sowcar Janaki as Mallika

== Production ==
The film Jayam Manade was inspired by the legend of Robin Hood and was a remake of the 1951 Hindi film Badal, which starred Premnath and Madhubala. Sundarlal Nehatha acquired the remake rights for his first independent Telugu production. He hired T. Prakash Rao to direct the film, and N. T. Rama Rao and Anjali Devi were cast in the lead roles. Muddukrishna wrote the dialogues, although his name did not appear in the film's titles or songbook.

== Soundtrack ==
Music composed by Ghantasala. Despite the film being a remake, Ghantasala composed an original score for Jayam Manade. The song "O Chandamama... Andaala Bhaama," has a melody that bears a resemblance to S. D. Burman's "Ye Raat Ye Chandni Phir Kahan" from the Hindi film Jaal (1952).

Song title	Lyrics	Singers	length
"Vinavoyi Batasari"	Kosaraju	Jikki	2:44
"Veeragandham Pettinamaya"	Kosaraju	Pithapuram, Jikki	3:01
"Desabhakti Gala"	Kosaraju	Ghantasala	3:03
"Maruvajalani Manasu Chalani"	Samudrala Sr.	P. Leela	2:29
"O Chandamama"	Muddu Krishna	Ghantasala	2:53
"Kaluvalaraja Kathavinarava"	Jampana Chandrasekhar Rao	P. Leela	3:07
"Chooda Chakkani Daana"	Vempati Sadasivabrahmam	Ghantasala, Jikki	2:36
"Chilakanna Chilukave"	Kosaraju	Madhavapeddi Sathyam, Jikki	3:28
"Vastundoy Vastundi"	Kosaraju	Ghantasala, Jikki	4:30
"Enta Mosapotine Antuteliyaleka Ne "	Samudrala	P.Leela	3:10

== Reception ==
Jayam Manade was released on May 4, 1956, and was a major commercial success. The film's engaging narrative, strong performances, and memorable music contributed to its popularity at the box office.
