= Dorangia Daku =

- Directed by: Harnam Singh Rawail
- Starring: Sunder; Baburao Pehalwan
- Release date: 1940
- Country: India
- Language: Hindi

Dorangia Daku is a 1940 Bollywood film which was directed by Harnam Singh Rawail. This is the debut film of director Rawali.

== Cast ==
- Sunder
- Baburao Pehalwan,
