= Bina Rai =

Indian actress

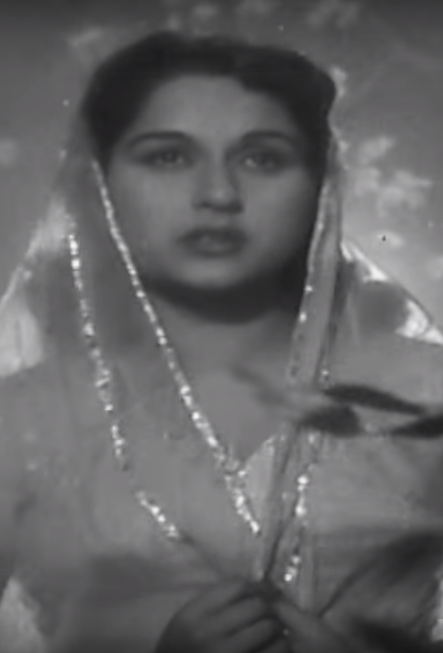
- Born: Krishna Sareen; 13 July 1932; Lucknow, United Provinces, British India (present-day Uttar Pradesh, India)
- Died: 6 December 2009 (aged 77); Mumbai, Maharashtra, India
- Other name: Beena Rai
- Occupations: Actress, Producer
- Years active: 1951–1968
- Spouse: Prem Nath (m. 1952; died 1992)
- Children: 2 sons,namely Prem Krishen; Kailash (Monty) Nath

Bina Rai (née Krishna Sareen; 13 July 1932 – 6 December 2009), also sometimes referred to as Beena Rai, was an Indian actress, primarily of the black and white era of Hindi cinema. She is most known for her roles in classics such as Anarkali (1953), Ghunghat (1960) and Taj Mahal (1963), and won the Filmfare Award for Best Actress for her performance in Ghunghat (1960).

== Early life ==
Based on an interview given to film historian Shishir Krishna Sharma (of Beete Hue Din blog fame) on 20 November 2005 (right after socializing with people at the 47th Annual General Body Meeting of Cine & T. V. Artists Association (CINTAA)) Bina Rai revealed she was born as Krishna Sareen on 13 July 1932 (not 1931 as is wrongly stated) in Lucknow (not Lahore as is wrongly believed). Her father was an officer in Railways. She said that everyone in their household was fond of watching films. Her favourite heroine was Khursheed Bano.

Based on other sources, her family was uprooted from Lahore during the communal frenzy and was resettled in Uttar Pradesh. She went to school in Lahore and then attended IT college in Lucknow, Uttar Pradesh, India. Bina Rai lived in Kanpur until she moved out for acting. She had to convince her parents to allow her to act in films, she claimed that she went on a hunger strike to convince her disapproving parents to let her join films, and they finally relented.

== Career ==
As per her 2005 interview, the then famous producer-director and actor Kishore Sahu was looking for a fresh face for his film Kali Ghata (1951). So he gave an advertisement in the newspapers inviting fresh talent. She was in 12th standard at that time. According to her son Prem Kishan who was also interviewed by Sharma, his mother Bina Rai came to Bombay (now Mumbai) with her brother and met Kishore Sahu, she auditioned and was chosen for the female lead role for Kali Ghata. Kishore Sahu also changed her real name Krishna Sareen to her screen name Bina Rai.

As per other sources, she was a first year student of Arts in the Isabella Thoburn College of Lucknow in 1950, when she came across an advertisement for a talent contest which was organized by Kishore Sahu to which, she applied and received a call from the sponsors. Although she had been active in college dramatics, a film career was never within her field of vision. Nevertheless, she went to Bombay to participate in the contest, where she won along with the 25,000 rupees in prize money, a leading role in Kishore Sahu's Kali Ghata (1951), which became her film debut, and also featured Kishore Sahu in the lead role.

On 2 September 1952 she married actor Premnath, whose sister Krishna was married to the actor-director Raj Kapoor and was part of the Kapoor family. They had acted together in some films, the first movie in which he was paired with Rai was Aurat (1953), a Bollywood version of the tragic Biblical tale of Samson and Delilah (1949). The film was not a hit, but Bina Rai and Premnath fell in love with each other. They married and soon set up their own production unit, known as P.N. Films. Their first film from P. N. Films was Shagufa (1953) and they had pinned high hopes on it, but audiences rejected it. Neither Bina Rai's elfin charm nor Premnath's sensitive portrayal of the role of a doctor could save Shagufa from being a flop. And the films that followed Shagufa are Prisoner of Golconda, Samunder and Watan disappeared almost as soon as they hit the theatre screens. The films they did together under other banners also failed to perform well. Thus the Premnath-Bina Rai pairing never clicked on the screen. Even though she had married and even though her films opposite her husband were unsuccessful, her career skyrocketed to success only after her marriage. She starred opposite well-known actors of her time viz. Ashok Kumar, Bharat Bhushan, Rehman, Ajit, Dilip Kumar, Dev Anand, Kishore Kumar and Shammi Kapoor. However, her films with leading man Pradeep Kumar remain her best-remembered performances, where she played the title role in Anarkali (1953), Taj Mahal (1963), Ghunghat (1960) for which she won the Filmfare Award for Best Actress.

In the 1970s, her son Prem Krishen became an actor and had one big hit; Dulhan Wohi Jo Piya Man Bhaye (1977), but couldn't sustain the momentum, so he turned producer, with the Cinevistaas banner, which went on produce TV series such as Kathasagar, Gul Gulshan Gulfam and Junoon. He launched his daughter Akanksha Malhotra as an actress in 2002 in his home productions, claiming that she reminds him so much of his mother Bina Rai.

Bina Rai stopped acting in films many years ago, claiming that women after a certain age don't get good roles. She also talked fondly of her husband Premnath, who had died on 3 November 1992. Owing to her husband's failing career as a leading man and the subsequent failure of their home productions also starring them that might have made Rai continue her acting career to meet the financial constraints. That is why as soon as Premnath's career stabilized with the film Teesri Manzil (1966) where he played the antagonist (one of his earliest negative roles), she immediately bid goodbye to films. Her last film was Pyas (1968) opposite Shekhar which was later changed to Apna Ghar Apni Kahani (1968) during the screen release of the film. In 2002, their son, Kailash (Monty) released a tribute album, to his father on the occasion of his 10th death anniversary and 86th birth anniversary, titled Amar Premnath, released by Saregama. Her grandson, Siddharth Malhotra, directed the successful TV series on doctors; Sanjivani (2004). In her 2005 interview to Sharma, she stated, "I belong from a traditional Indian family. The sanskars instilled by my parents have been deeply rooted in me. And this was the reason why in spite of being a successful actress I didn't let the charm and glamour of this industry affect me. I have always stayed away from controversies. I completely understood the importance of a family life, hence I didn't hesitate even a bit to accept Premnath-ji's marriage proposal." She further said, "I always molded myself according to changing times. I was never very ambitious and readily accepted whatever life offered me. Today I spend a peaceful life along with my son (Monty) and daughter-in-law and with my grandchildren and now I have even become a great grandmother. I relentlessly kept myself hidden from my fans and media only because I find no point in reminiscing about the past and re-living days that are long gone. The peace one finds in living a simple life can't be found anywhere else."

== Personal life and death ==
On 2 September 1952, Bina Rai married Premnath who had then recently broke up with Madhubala after the latter started an affair with Dilip Kumar. Rai and Nath had fallen for each other during the making of their first film together namely Aurat (1953) and got married before its release. They had two sons, actors Prem Krishen (born 5 July 1953) and Kailash Nath (Monty) (born 25 May 1958). Bina Rai spent the last years of her life with her younger son Monty, an actor, his family in southern Mumbai's Malabar Hill's famous Anita building. She died on 6 December 2009, following a cardiac arrest at the age of 77. She is survived by her two sons and grandchildren. Prem Kishen had a short-term career as a film actor before shifting to film and television production; Cinevistaas Limited. Her grandson, Siddharth Malhotra is a film director, who made his debut with Dharma Productions's We Are Family (2010).

== Awards ==
- 1961: Filmfare Award for Best Actress: Ghunghat

== Filmography ==
Year	Film	Role	Opposite	Notes
1951	Kali Ghata	Sonia Gordon	Kishore Sahu	Debut role and film
1952	Sapna		Kishore Sahu	
1953	Anarkali	Nadira alias Anarkali	Pradeep Kumar	
1953	Aurat	Juhi	Premnath Malhotra	
1953	Gauhar	Rani	Rehman Khan	
1953	Shagufa		Premnath Malhotra	Also Co-producer alongside husband Prem Nath who also starred opposite her
1953	Shole : A Tale of Burning Tears	Bina	Ashok Kumar	
1954	Golconda Ka Qaidi (Hindi) alias Prisoner of Golconda (English)	Krishna alias Kittu	Premnath Malhotra	The English version remained unreleased until it was finally released on 16 January 2021 in YouTube by her son Monty in his channel Major Mood Entertainment excluding the songs (which are in Hindi)
1954	Meenaar	Roopmati alias Roopa	Bharat Bhushan	
1955	Insaniyat	Durga	Dev Anand	
1955	Madh Bhare Nain	Malti	Kishore Kumar	
1955	Marine Drive	Bina	Ajit Khan	
1955	Sardar		Ashok Kumar	
1956	Chandrakanta	Chandrakanta	Bharat Bhushan	
1956	Durgesh Nandini	Durgesh Nandini	Pradeep Kumar	
1956	Hamara Watan		Premnath Malhotra	Worked opposite husband Prem Nath
1957	Bandi	Mala	Ashok Kumar	
1957	Changez Khan	Azra	Premnath Malhotra	Worked opposite husband Prem Nath
1957	Mera Salam		Bharat Bhushan	
1957	Samunder	Bela	Premnath Malhotra	Also Co-producer alongside husband Prem Nath who also directed the film starred opposite her
1957	Talaash	Tara	Ashok Kumar	
1960	Ghunghat	Parvati	Bharat Bhushan	Won Filmfare Award for Best Actress
1962	Vallah Kya Baat Hai	Rina	Shammi Kapoor	Worked opposite one of her brothers-in-law Shammi Kapoor
1963	Taj Mahal	Arjumand Bano alias Mumtaz Mahal	Pradeep Kumar	
1966	Daadi Maa	Parvati Rai	Ashok Kumar	
1967	Ram Rajya	Sita	Kumar Sen	
1968	Pyas alias Apna Ghar Apni Kahani	Mira	Shekhar	Final role and film
