= Roop Ki Rani Choron Ka Raja (1961 film) =

Roop Ki Rani Choron Ka Raja (1961)
- Directed by: Harnam Singh Rawail
- Written by: Abrar Alvi (dialogues); Hasrat Jaipuri (lyrics); Shailendra (lyrics)
- Screenplay by: Harnam Singh Rawail; Abrar Alvi
- Story by: Suhrid Kar
- Produced by: Harnam Singh Rawail
- Starring: Waheeda Rehman; Dev Anand
- Cinematography: Dwarkadas Divecha
- Edited by: Krishan Sachdev
- Music by: Shankar–Jaikishan
- Production company: Rahul Pictures
- Distributed by: Rahul Pictures
- Release date: 1961
- Country: India
- Language: Hindi
- Box office: ₹70 lakh

Roop Ki Rani Choron Ka Raja is a 1961 Indian Hindi-language film directed by Harnam Singh Rawail. The film stars Waheeda Rehman and Dev Anand and features a soundtrack composed by Shankar–Jaikishan.

Released in late 1961, the film was described in a Times of India review as a "promising story" which proved a "pot-boiler". According to estimates provided by Box Office India, Roop Ki Rani Choron Ka Raja grossed ₹70 lakh at the box office and was a financial failure. It was the sixteenth-highest-grossing Indian film of the year.

== Cast ==
Dev Anand as Chhagan

Waheeda Rehman as Roopa

Jeevan as Langad Deen

Manorama as Chameli Bai

Hiralal as Tapasvi Maharaj

Sunder as Baanke Bihari

Jagdish Raj as Seth

Indira Bansal as Seth's wife

Rajendra Nath

Randhir

Iftekhar

Gautam Mukherjee

== Soundtrack ==
While Shankar-Jaikishan provided the music direction, the lyrics were penned by Hasrat Jaipuri and Shailendra while Talat Mahmood, Lata Mangeshkar, Asha Bhosle, Mahendra Kapoor and Subir Sen provided the vocals.

Song	Singer(s)	Lyricist
"Tu Roop Ki Rani Main Choron Ka Raja..."	Talat Mahmood and Lata Mangeshkar	Hasrat Jaipuri
"Suno Bhai Humne Pee Li Hai Thodi..."	Talat Mahmood	Hasrat Jaipuri
"Tum Toh Dil Ke Taar Chher Kar..." (Male)	Talat Mahmood	Shailendra
"Tum Toh Dil Ke Taar Chher Kar..." (Female)	Lata Mangeshkar	Shailendra
"Aisi Hi Agar Marzi Hai Teri..."	Lata Mangeshkar	Shailendra
"Kahan Jaate Hain Woh Kahan Jaate Hain..."	Lata Mangeshkar and Mahendra Kapoor	Shailendra
"Jaao Na Sataao Rasiya..."	Asha Bhosle	Shailendra
"Aaja Re Aaja Re Aaja Aaja Nain Dwaare..."	Asha Bhosle and Subir Sen	Shailendra
