= Sunghursh =

- Directed by: Harnam Singh Rawail
- Screenplay by: Anjana Rawail; Dialogue: Gulzar and Abrar Alvi
- Story by: Layli Asmaner Ayna by Mahasweta Devi
- Produced by: Harnam Singh Rawail
- Starring: Dilip Kumar; Vyjayanthimala; Balraj Sahni; Sanjeev Kumar
- Cinematography: R. D. Mathur
- Edited by: Krushna Sachdev
- Music by: Naushad
- Production company: Rahul Theatre
- Distributed by: Shemaroo Entertainment
- Release date: 18 October 1968
- Running time: 158 minutes
- Country: India
- Language: Hindi

Sunghursh ("Struggle") is a 1968 Indian Hindi film directed and produced by Harnam Singh Rawail. It is based on Layli Asmaner Ayna ("Layli Does Not Go To Heaven"), a short story in Bengali language by Jnanpith Award-winning writer Mahasweta Devi, which presents a fictionalised account of a vendetta within a thuggee cult in the holy Indian town of Varanasi. It stars Dilip Kumar, Vyjayanthimala, Balraj Sahni, Sanjeev Kumar, Jayant, Deven Verma, Durga Khote and Iftekhar. The film was the last one to see Dilip Kumar and Vyjayanthimala working together.

The music is by Naushad and lyrics for the songs are by Shakeel Badayuni. Naushad and Badayuni had worked together on many films previously and were "the most sought after" composer-lyricist duo of the time in Bollywood. Sunghursh was popularly mistaken to be a debut film of Sanjeev Kumar.

The director Harnam Singh Rawail's son Rahul Rawail, who is also a director, paid a tribute to this film by titling one of his as Jeevan Ek Sanghursh (1990) starring Anil Kapoor and Madhuri Dixit.

== Plot ==
Bhavani Prasad is a powerful Shakta priest at Kashi. Prasad, a devotee of the black goddess Kali and a thuggee, religiously follows the practice of murdering wealthy travelers who stay in his pilgrim guesthouse and offers them as a sacrifice to Kali. Prasad's son Shankar does not agree with such practices, opposes his father, and decides to leave the village with his wife and their three children: Kundan, Yashoda and Gopal. Prasad forcibly takes Kundan with him to follow in his footsteps and forbids him from seeing the rest of the family.

Young Kundan is now being raised by his grandfather Prasad, who desires to have Kundan as his successor, head of a temple and a pilgrim guesthouse on the banks of the Ganges River. Prasad mysteriously kills his son and puts the blame on his enemy and nephew, Naubatlal. Prasad had earlier killed Naubatlal's father. When Naubatlal learns the truth, he decides to take revenge, but Prasad kills Naubatlal before he can do anything. Naubatlal's family decides to leave the village and settle down in Calcutta where his two young sons, Dwarka (Sanjeev Kumar) and Ganeshi Prasad, work as merchants. They learn about their father's death from their mother (Mumtaz Begum) and swear to avenge their father's death by killing Prasad and his grandson, Kundan (Dilip Kumar).

Kundan continues to serve Prasad in the Banaras temple, but does not follow the practice of killing people. When he is invited to his younger sister, Yashodha's marriage, Kundan gets a chance to visit his mother and grandmother and his siblings after many years. One day, Kundan meets Laila-E-Aasmaan, a courtesan, in the temple who has come from Calcutta after her madam's death. Kundan falls in love with Laila only to realise that she was his childhood friend, Munni. Kundan proposes to Laila, but Prasad does not agree to the marriage, knowing that Laila was hired by Dwarka and Ganesh Prasad to seduce Kundan and bring him to them.

Kundan decides to end the feud with Dwarka, but Dwarka does not co-operate. Dwarka attacks Kundan, but is killed by him. As repentance for his grandfather's sins, Kundan decides to serve Ganeshi and takes another identity, that of Bajrangi to make peace with him, only to realise that Ganeshi Prasad is in love with Laila and wants to marry her as his second wife.

== Cast ==
- Dilip Kumar as Kundan Prasad / Bajrangi
- Vyjayanthimala as Munni / Laila-E-Aasmaan
- Balraj Sahni as Ganeshi Prasad
- Sanjeev Kumar as Dwarka Prasad
- Jayant as Bhavani Prasad
- Durga Khote as Bhavani Prasad's Wife
- Anju Mahendru as Yashoda Prasad
- Sunder as Kundan's Uncle
- Ulhas as Bheem
- Deven Verma as Nisar
- Padma Khanna as Mama's Wife
- Sulochana Latkar as Shankar's Wife
- Iftekhar as Shankar Prasad
- Urmila Bhatt as Kunti Prasad
- Padma Rani as Dwarka's Wife
- D. K. Sapru as Naubatlal Prasad
- Ram Mohan as Ishwarlal
- Jagdish Raj as Raja Sahib
- Mumtaz Begum as Naubatlal's Wife
- Mehmood Junior as Dwarka's Son
- Dilip Dhawan as Young Kundan

== Production ==
Director Rawail had considered Sadhana to play the lead actress of the film. He had waited for months to sign her in his Mere Mehboob (1963). But now the actress had developed thyroid problems and took a break from acting for treatment in Boston. Eventually, Rawail signed Vyjayanthimala for the role. Dilip Kumar and Vyjayanthimala who had worked together for Naya Daur (1957) were then said to have a romantic affair. The actors parted after Vyjayanthimala worked with Raj Kapoor in the 1964 Hindi film Sangam. Thus, most of the scenes between the two actors for Sungharsh were shot separately.

When the film was near completion, it was rumoured that with the increasing conflicts between the two leading actors, Vyjayanthimala would be replaced by another actress, Waheeda Rehman. Rehman had already replaced Vyjayanthimala in another Hindi film starring Kumar, Ram Aur Shyam, (1967) which was being shot simultaneously with Sunghursh. Vyjayanthimala readily declined the claim of her leaving the film when it was about to finish its shooting. Sunghursh was the last film where Kumar and Vyjayanthimala worked together. By then, both the actors had done the maximum number of films together and each was a commercial success.

Sanjeev Kumar, who had previously acted in theatre and other smaller film productions, was noticed through his performance of a negative role in Sunghursh, and he then shot to fame. He was commended for his role while a newcomer as compared with established actors like Dilip Kumar and Balraj Sahni. The film was popularly mistaken to be his debut.

As Sunghursh was set in Varanasi during the 19th century, Rawail took special care about the costumes and sets to create the look for the period. The actor-director Rajesh Roshan had worked as an assistant director on the film.

== Soundtrack ==
The music for all the songs was composed by Naushad and the lyrics were written by Shakeel Badayuni. Naushad and Badayuni had worked together on many films previously and were "the most sought after" composer-lyricist duo of the time in Bollywood. Their collaborations of Baiju Bawra (1952), Mother India (1957), Mughal-E-Azam (1960) and more are quite popular. They had worked with Rawail and had given the musical hit Mere Mehboob in 1963. The film's soundtrack has seven songs sung by Mohammad Rafi and Lata Mangeshkar with one song sung by Asha Bhosle. All are solo songs where Naushad used the music from the regions of Awadh and eastern Uttar Pradesh. But critics have considered these compositions "below par" as compared with Naushad's other work.

Similar to his earlier work where Naushad had simplified Hindustani classical music to produce filmi songs, the solo "Mere Paas Aao Nazar To Milao" rendered by Lata Mangeshkar was based on Bhairavi Raga. The song "Mere Pairon Mein Ghunghroo" by Rafi was included in "101 Mohammad Rafi Hits by Shemaroo Entertainment on his 31st death anniversary. The singer died on 31 July 1980. The song was also used by former Chief Ministers of Bihar Lalu Prasad Yadav during the election campaign for 2010 Bihar Legislative Assembly election.

Song	Singer	Raga
"Jab Dil Se Dil Takrata Hai"	Mohammed Rafi	Kirwani
"Ishq Deewana, Husn Bhi Ghayal"	Mohammed Rafi	
"Mere Pairon Mein Ghunghroo"	Mohammed Rafi	Kafi (raga)
"Mere Paas Aao, Nazar To Milao"	Lata Mangeshkar	Bhairavi (Hindustani)
"Chhedo Na Dil Ki Baat"	Lata Mangeshkar	
"Agar Yeh Husn Mera"	Lata Mangeshkar	
"Tasveer-E-Mohabbat"	Asha Bhosle	

== Awards ==
At the 16th Filmfare Awards, Dilip Kumar was nominated for the Best Actor for Sunghursh as well as for Aadmi. However, the award was presented to Shammi Kapoor for his performance in Brahmachari. Kumar received the Bengal Film Journalists' Association Awards for Best Actor in Hindi. The film won four more awards in various categories at 32nd Annual BFJA Awards.

Award	Ceremony	Category	Nominee	Result	Refs.
Filmfare Awards	16th Filmfare Awards	Best Actor	Dilip Kumar	Nominated	
Bengal Film Journalists' Association Awards	32nd Annual BFJA Awards	Fourth Best Indian Film	Harnam Singh Rawail	Won	
Bengal Film Journalists' Association Awards	32nd Annual BFJA Awards	Best Actor	Dilip Kumar	Won	
Bengal Film Journalists' Association Awards	32nd Annual BFJA Awards	Best Actress	Vyjayanthimala	Won	
Bengal Film Journalists' Association Awards	32nd Annual BFJA Awards	Best Supporting Actor	Jayant	Won	
Bengal Film Journalists' Association Awards	32nd Annual BFJA Awards	Best Dialogue	Gulzar & Abrar Alvi	Won	
