= Anarkali (1953 film) =

1953 film

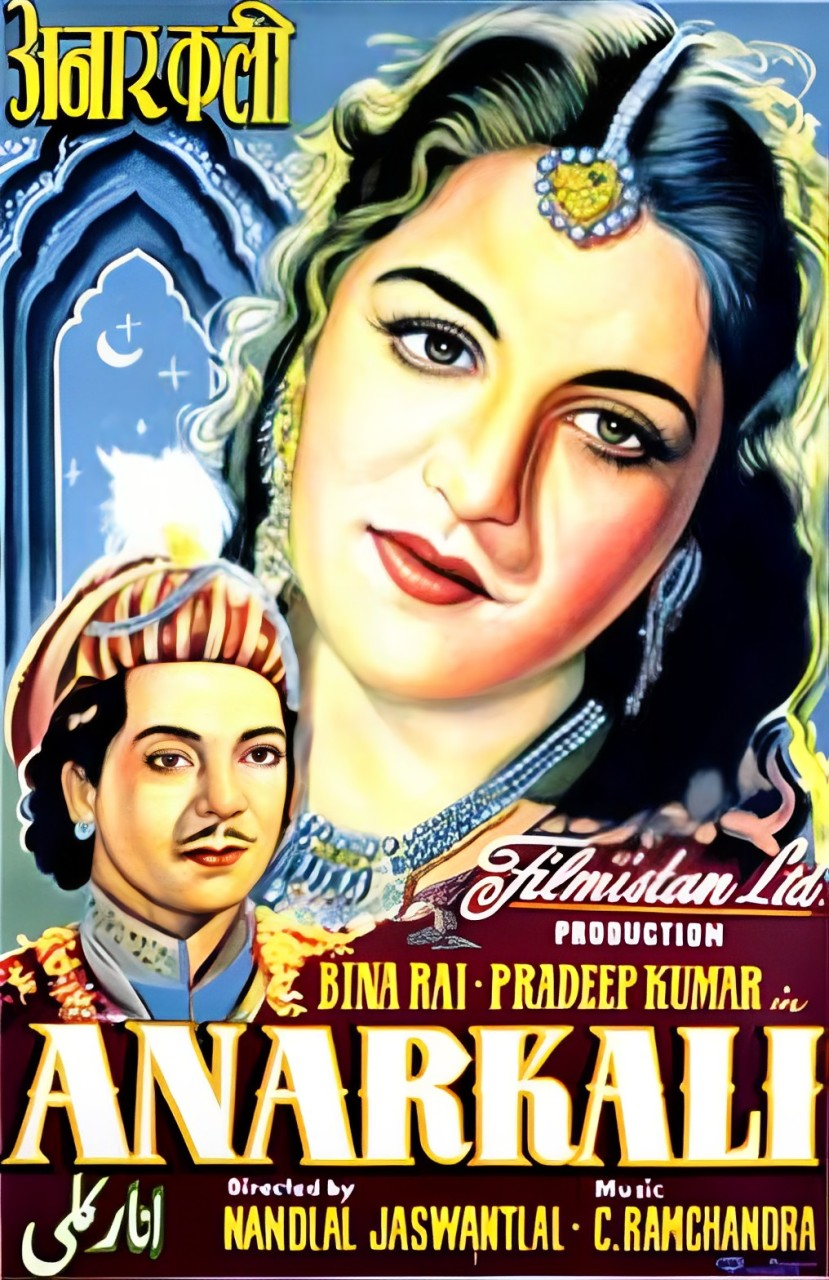
- Directed by: Nandlal Jaswantlal
- Written by: Ramesh Saigal; Hameed Butt (Dialogue Director)
- Screenplay by: Ramesh Saigal
- Story by: Nasir Hussain
- Based on: Anārkalī by Imtiaz Ali Taj
- Produced by: Filmistan Ltd.
- Starring: Pradeep Kumar; Bina Rai; Kuldip Kaur; Mubarak
- Cinematography: Marshall Braganza
- Edited by: Babu Lavande
- Music by: C. Ramchandra; Vasant Prakash
- Production company: Filmistan Ltd.
- Distributed by: Filmistan Ltd.
- Release date: 2 January 1953
- Running time: 148 mins
- Country: India
- Languages: Hindi; Urdu
- Box office: ₹23.5 million

Anarkali is a 1953 Indian historical drama film, directed by Nandlal Jaswantlal, and written by Nasir Hussain and Hameed Butt, based on the historical legend of the Mughal emperor Jahangir (Salim). As per the legend, Jahangir revolted against his father Akbar over his love for a common girl called Anarkali.

It was the top grossing Hindi film in the year of its release - 1953. On the same theme, Mughal-e-Azam was released in 1960, which turned out to be one of the biggest box office successes in the history of Indian cinema and a major critical success as well. While Anarkali portrayed the story from Anarkali's perspective, Mughal-e-Azam told the story from the perspective of Mughal emperor Akbar.

== Plot ==
Shahenshah Jalal-ud-din Akbar is the grandson of Babur, and the son of Humayun. He is known to have ruled over Hindustan with a humane and just heart. He knew in order to garner the support of the Hindus, he must treat them sensitively, allow them to worship freely, and in order to maintain this peace, he married Jodha Bai, a Hindu Rajput, the sister of Raja Bhagwant Das. Through this marriage they became the proud parents of Shehzada Salim (who took the regal name of Jahangir when he took to the throne). Akbar first met Nadira in the Anar garden, while she was awaiting the arrival of her lover. So pleased he was with her that he wanted to reward her, but she only asked for an Anar, so he ended up bestowing her with the name of 'Anarkali'. He met her the second time when she was able to revive Salim, who was seriously wounded in a war in Kabul. Once again Akbar was pleased with her, wanted to reward her, but again she turned him down. The third time she ended up annoying Akbar when she sang and danced in his court under the influence of alcohol, and he has her imprisoned. The very foundations of Akbar's palace will be shaken to the roots, and his manner of meting out justice will be put to the extreme test, when he finds out that Salim is in love with Anarkali and wants to marry her. While Akbar may have been successful to end the strife between Hindus and Muslims, but will be able to break down the wall between the rich and the poor?

== Cast ==
- Pradeep Kumar as Shehzada Salim/Jahangir
- Bina Rai as Nadira/Anarkali
- Kuldip Kaur as Gulnar
- Ruby Mayer as Rani Jodha Bai
- S. L. Puri as Raja Man Singh
- Manmohan Krishna as Parvez
- Mubarak as Shahenshah Akbar

== Soundtrack ==
The composer Vasant Prakash was initially appointed as the music director of this film, but fell ill and had to withdraw from this film project with the film producer S. Mukerji after having recorded just one song with Geeta Dutt. Prakash had intended for all of the female songs in this film to be given to Geeta Dutt. Then the composer C. Ramchandra took over the project, and insisted not only that all of the female songs be sung by Lata Mangeshkar, but that the Geeta Dutt number also be removed from the film. Although the Filmistan group agreed, the Geeta Dutt song stayed in the movie, the famous Aa Jaan-E-Wafa. The film song lyrics are written by Jan Nissar Akhtar, Shailendra, Rajendra Krishan, Hasrat Jaipuri.

Song	Singer	Raga
"Aa Jaan-E-Wafa"	Geeta Dutt	
"Aaja Ab To Aaja"	Lata Mangeshkar	
"Dua Kar Gham-E-Dil"	Lata Mangeshkar	Jogiya (raga)
"Mujhse Mat Poochh"	Lata Mangeshkar	
"Mohabbat Aisi Dhadkan Hai"	Lata Mangeshkar	Rageshri
"Mohabbat Mein Aise Kadam"	Lata Mangeshkar	
"Yeh Zindagi Usi Ki Hai" - 1	Lata Mangeshkar	Bhimpalasi
"Yeh Zindagi Usi Ki Hai" - 2	Lata Mangeshkar	Bhimpalasi
"O Aasmanwale"	Lata Mangeshkar	
"Jaag Dard-E-Ishq Jaag, Dil Ko Bekarar Kar Chhedke Aansuon Ka Raag"	Lata Mangeshkar, Hemant Kumar	Bageshri
"Zindagi Pyar Ki Do Char Ghadi Hoti Hai"	Hemant Kumar	Desh (raga)
"Ae Baad-E-Saba Aahista Chal, Yahan Soii Hui Hai Anarkali"	Hemant Kumar	

== Box office ==
In India, it was the top-grossing film of 1953, grossing ₹23.5 million ($4.94 million). (Note: 4.7619 Indian rupees per US dollar from 1951 to 1965) This is equivalent o $59 million (₹2.96 billion) adjusted for inflation in 2016.
