= Badal (1951 film) =

1951 film by Amiya Chakraborty

- Directed by: Amiya Chakravarty
- Screenplay by: Rajendra Shankar
- Story by: Amiya Chakravarty
- Produced by: Bhagwan Das Varma
- Starring: Madhubala; Prem Nath
- Cinematography: V. Baba Saheb
- Edited by: Ramrao Ghatke; Vinayak Joshi; D. B. Joshi
- Music by: Shankar–Jaikishan
- Production company: Varma Films
- Distributed by: Varma Films
- Release date: 1 May 1951
- Running time: 147 minutes
- Country: India
- Language: Hindustani
- Box office: est. ₹0.9 crore (est. ₹645.3 crore as of 2016)

Badal is a 1951 Indian Hindustani-language romantic action film directed by Amiya Chakravarty and produced by Bhagwan Das Varma. Starring Madhubala, Prem Nath (in the title role), and Purnima, the film tells the story of a common man named Badal, who wants to exact revenge upon the Jagirdar for killing his father but ends up falling for his daughter Ratna. Released in May 1951, Badal became one of the biggest box-office hits of the year. The film title comes from the Persian word for revenge. It was remade in Telugu as Jayam Manade (1956).

== Plot ==
Badal Singh is a young man whose father was brutally killed for not being able to pay the revenue to the collectors. The king is away, and the kingdom is ruled by a greedy Jagirdar. Badal, in order to exact revenge upon his father's murderers, forms a group of village men who steal from the Jagirdar's palace and distribute the stolen money among the people. An old Jagirdar has to thus announce a reward of a hundred golden coins for the person who would bring Badal to his feet, but no one is able to catch him.

One day, Badal and his group get to learn that the Jagirdar's young daughter Ratna is coming back to the kingdom from her maternal home. Unlike her father, Ratna is a childish and happy girl who loves riding horses. Badal's friend Himmat stops Ratna's palanquin en route, kidnaps her and takes her to Badal's hiding place. Ratna has not yet seen Badal; Badal asks Himmat to pose as him, and he himself dons a disguise of Baga Singh. Badal (as Baga) indulges in a fake fight with Himmat (who is acting as Badal) in front of Ratna and saves her. He takes her to the palace, singing a song for her. Ratna is impressed by his personality and singing talent and slowly falls in love with him as Baga Singh. They begin meeting and romancing each other frequently, without the knowledge of the Jagirdar.

One day, Ratna goes to Badal/Baga's house (which is actually his friend Myna's living place, and he lives as a guest there). Jai Singh, Ratna's fiancée, follows her to Myna's house. When Ratna is talking with Baga, Jai, hidden behind a pillar, recognises him as Badal. A sword fight takes place between Baga and Jai, in which Badal's true identity is revealed. A heartbroken Ratna leaves his house in disgust. Now how will Badal make Ratna understand his motive? Will they ever reunite? What will happen to his father's revenge?

== Cast ==
- Madhubala as Ratna
- Prem Nath as Badal Singh
- Purnima as Myna
- Agha as Himmat
- Randhir as Jagirdar Mahipal Singh
- Krishnakant as Badal's uncle
- S. Nazeer as Jai Singh
- Bazid Khan (as Bazeed Khan)

== Production ==
Badal was inspired from The Adventures of Robin Hood (1938). It was the first film to star Madhubala and Prem Nath together. The film was announced in February 1951 along with Saqi (1952), one more Madhubala-Nath starrer. Madhubala briefly dated Prem Nath during the film's production before she fell in love with Dilip Kumar.

== Soundtrack ==
The soundtrack of Badal was composed by Shankar–Jaikishan. Lyrics were penned by Hasrat Jaipuri and Shailendra. Playback singers included Lata Mangeshkar (for Madhubala) and Mukesh (for Prem Nath). The film's music was one of the reasons of its success.

No.	Title	Singer(s)	Length
1.	"Aansoo Bahane Wale"	Lata Mangeshkar	3:48
2.	"Saawan Ka Mausam Suhana"	Lata Mangeshkar	4:04
3.	"Main Rahi Bhatakne Wala"	Mukesh	3:08
4.	"Do Din Ke Liye"	Lata Mangeshkar	3:15
5.	"Unse Pyar Ho Gaya"	Lata Mangeshkar	3:10
6.	"Ae Dil Na Mujhse Chhupa"	Lata Mangeshkar	4:25
7.	"Rota Hai Mera Dil"	Lata Mangeshkar	4:02
8.	"Anmol Pyar Bin Mol Beeke"	Lata Mangeshkar	3:59
Total length:			29:51

== Release ==
Before Badal was released on 1 May 1951 at the New Amar theatre, it was heavily publicised by the local distributor Ranjit Singh Seble. The film's posters were put were put on both sides of hired local rickshaw-pullers and on the vehicle sat a man with a loudspeaker announcing to the public that the film would be released at the New Amar soon.

Badal's pamphlets were distributed all the way to G.B. Road and Bazar Sitaram, and some special cut-outs of actors Prem Nath and Madhubala astride a horse were erected in the front of the cinema. Incidentally, the shot was from the song "Main Rahi Bhatakne Wala Hoon", sung by Mukesh.

== Reception ==
The film received a positive review by S. B. Hussain of Indian Daily Mail, highlighting the "very well knit screenplay" and "exceedingly fine production values". Purnima was particularly praised for her performance and hailed as "a good addition to our family of stars".

Baadal completed a silver jubilee run at the New Amar theatre. Overall, the film proved a box-office hit, and grossed ₹90 lakh along with a net of ₹50 lakh. It was the seventh highest-grossing film of 1951. According to The Hindu, the film was a blockbuster success. The film was popular in Pakistan as well, completing a 25 week-run in Karachi. In 2011, Best of the Year gave its inflation-adjusted gross as ₹645.3 crore.

== Impact ==
Former actress Ameeta is said to have become a huge admirer of Madhubala after watching Badal and had caught the attention of director-writer Lekhraj Bhakhri when she was enacting her idol's sword fighting scene from the film.
