= Subir Sen =

Indian playback singer (1934–2015)

- Born: 24 July 1934; Dibrugarh, Assam Province, British India
- Died: 29 December 2015 (aged 81) Kolkata, West Bengal, India
- Genres: World music, Pop
- Occupation: Singer
- Instruments: Vocal, singing
- Years active: 1950–2015

Subir Sen (24 July 1934 – 29 December 2015) was an Indian playback singer who sang modern songs in Bengali and Hindi. He was also one of the artists of Rabindra Sangeet.

== Personal life ==
Sen was born in Dibrugarh, Assam to Sailesh Chandra Sen and Lily Sen. Sailesh was a doctor. They also had a pharmacy in Guwahati. His siblings were Prithwish Sen, Gauri Sen, Sunil Sen and Arun Sen. He passed the Matric Examination from Guwahati and came to Kolkata in pursuit of music. He was married to Roma Sen.

Runa Laila, a notable Bangladeshi singer, was one of Sen's nieces.

== Career in Music ==
Music interested Subir Sen from a young age. During his schooling, he attended a classical vocal music competition at Morris College, Lucknow. He secured first place and received his award from Pandit Shrikrishna Ratanjankar. In 1951, he came to Kolkata and was admitted to Ashutosh College. While in Kolkata, he started taking music lessons from Pandit Chinmoy Lahiri, who sent Sen to Shri Usha Ranjan Mukherjee to learn thumri.

While he was studying in Ashutosh College he took part in the KEREJU Music Competition conducted by His Master's Voice, and he was selected as first among around fourteen hundred competitors. Subir Sen described this event in his own words in "আমি তো গেয়েছি সেই গান" (Aami to geyechi sei gaan), where he sang a song composed by his mentor Sri Anupam Ghatak: "সারা রাত জ্বলে সন্ধ্যাপ্রদীপ" (Saara raat jale sandhyaprodip).

Sen's first record was released by Columbia records in February 1954 and contained two Bengali modern songs whose music was composed by Sri Chitto Roy and lyrics written by Sri Shyamal Gupta: "জীবন-বাতি নিভিয়ে যেদিন" (Jibon-bati niviye jedin) and "আর কত জানাব তোমায়" (Aar koto janabo tomay). Subir Sen was invited to Mumbai by Guru Dutt. Sudhin Dasgupta, a musician, too was invited by Guru Dutt to work for his production house. For some time, Subir Sen and Sudhin Dasgupta stayed together in Tardeo Sonawala building in Mumbai when Sudhin composed a song "এত সুর আর এত গান" (Eto sur aar eto gaan), which was recorded by Subir Sen much later. The second record of Subir Sen appeared in 1956 and contained two compositions of Sudhin Dasgupta, "ঐ উজ্জ্বল দিন ডাকে স্বপ্ন রঙ্গীন" (Oi ujjal din daake swapno rongin) and "স্বর্ণঝরা সূর্যরঙে" (Swarnajhora surjoronge). It was this record of Subir Sen that made him famous and gave Subir Sen a permanent place in the world of Bengali music.

While in Mumbai, Subir Sen was scouted by Shankar-Jaikishan, the famous music composer-duo and was inducted to the Mumbai film industry. In J. Om Prakash's first production, Aas Ka Panchhi (1961) starring Rajendra Kumar, Subir Sen sang the title song through the lip of the hero riding on a bicycle leading a team of NCC cadets: Dil mera ek aas ka panchhi, udta hai oonche gagan par. Subir Sen also lent his voice to various Hindi movies such as Chhoti Bahen (1959), Boy Friend (1961) and Passport (1961). He was associated with Salil Chowdhury, Sudhin Dasgupta, Abhijit Bandopadhyay, Anal Chatterjee, Amiyo Dasgupta and many other noted music composers of Calcutta (Kolkata) and Bombay (Mumbai).

In 1967, Subir Sen debuted as a music director when composing music for Bengali film মিস প্রিয়ম্বদা (Miss Priyambada). In 1972, he was music director for the Hindi film "Midnight." The film, directed by Raju, was released in England in 1972. Playback songs were: Koi mera ho gaya (Subir Sen), London ke mele mein & Zindagi ka hai yeh fasana (Md. Rafi), Tumsa meet mila (Geeta Dutt and Talat Mahmood), and Tere yaad mein sajan (Geeta Dutt).

Subir Sen acted in several movies in Bengali and Hindi. He was an actor-singer in Bengali movies Momer Alo (1964) (with Uttam Kumar) and Anubhav (1971) (with Sanjeev Kumar). He was offered the lead role in the Hindi movie Abhimaan by Hrishikesh Mukherjee and when Subir Sen declined, it was given to Amitabh Bachchan.

Subir Sen's literary contributions are rare and difficult to retrieve, but his writings' spontaneity may be observed in a chapter of a book titled Shyamal Mitra – a compilation of essays, a memoir of Shyamal Mitra.

== Awards ==
- 2007 – Harmonica Sangeet Samman – Lifetime achievement award.
- 2012 – Sangeet Maha Samman by Government of West Bengal
- 2013 – "Banga Bibhushan" by the Government of West Bengal.

== Death and legacy ==
Survived by his daughter (Supriya Sen, presently a professor in occupational therapy at Virginia Commonwealth University), he died of lung cancer in Kolkata, West Bengal, India, at 8 a.m. on 29 December 2015. Subir Sen had a deep, dreamy, romantic and appealing voice. His renditions of Rabindra Sangeet, Hindi film songs, and Bangla modern songs were popular and represented a genre of its own kind. Sen was fond of Western music, particularly of Jim Reeves and Nat King Cole. According to Abhijit Bandopadhyay, he created an international style of his own.

== Discography ==
Film and Non-film songs of Subir Sen

Subir Sen Discography
Year	Song	Film/Director	Language	Music Composer	Lyrics	Starring
1962	Aa ja re nayan dware solo	Roop Ki Rani Choro Ka Raja; Dir: H S Rawail	Hindi	Shankar – Jaikishen	Shailendra	Dev Anand & Waheeda Rehman
1962	Aa ja re nayan dware with Asha Bhonsle	Roop Ki Rani Choro Ka Raja; H S Rawail	Hindi	Shankar – Jaikishen	Shailendra	Dev Anand & Waheeda Rehman
-	Aagneogiri ke jwolte dekhe	-	Bengali	-	-	-
1968	Aah dil mein hain nayan mein neer hain	Rani Chandrawati	Hindi	S N Tripathi		Lalita Pawar
-	Aaha piano amar prothom prem mon rangano	-	Bengali	Kalyan Sen Barat	Shibdas Bandyopadhyay	-
1956	Aaja re aaja with Geeta Dutt	C I D Chhoo Mantar	Hindi	Shankar – Jaikishen		
-	Aakash jekhane golpo bole	-	Bengali	-		-
1981	Aamar jibon tarani	-	Bengali	Salil Chowdhury	Salil Chowdhury	-
1973	Aami je tomar tumi je aamar with Asha Bhonsle	Kayaheener Kahini; Dir: Ajay Kar	Bengali	Mukul Roy	-	Uttam Kumar, Aparna Sen
1973	Aami pore nilam	Album titled Mousumi mon	Bengali		-	-
1954	Aar kato janabo tomay	-	Bengali	Chitta Roy	Shyamal Gupta	Columbia Records (GE24715)
1981	Aar kichhu smorone nei	-	Bengali	Salil Chowdhury	Salil Chowdhury	-
1981	Adhikar ke kake dey	-	Bengali	Salil Chowdhury	Salil Chowdhury	CMRS-107
-	Aranyer jhor	-	Bengali	Subir Sen	Kumar Bishwarup	-
-	Asto akash jemon kore	-	Bengali	Sailen Mukherjee	Indrajit	-
1961	Baharen Luta Ke Nazare Dikha Ke with Suman Kalyanpur	Anarbala	Hindi	Bulo C Rani	Ramesh Chandra Pandey	Daljeet, Krishna Kumari
-	Bandhu tomake jeno	-	Bengali	Swapan Roy	Gopinath Mukhopadhyay	-
1965	Bujh gaya dil ka diya	Jadui Anguthi; Dir: A M Khan	Hindi	Suresh Kumar	Zafar Rahi	Chitra, Manher Desai, Krishna Kumari
1963	Chand tale jhoom jhoom, thirak rahi hain ghoonghar with Suman Kalyanpur	Jab Se Tumhe Dekha Hai; Kedar Kapoor	Hindi	Dattaram		Pradeep Kumar, Geeta Bali, Shammi Kapoor
-	Chand tumi eto alo kotha hote pele	-	Bengali	Abhijit Banerjee	Bankim Ghosh	-
-	Chondon anka chhotto kopal	-	Bengali	-		-
1961	Dekho Na Jao Jane Man	Boy Friend; Dir: Naresh Saigal	Hindi	Shankar – Jaikishen		Shammi Kapoor, Madhubala & Dharmendra
-	Deyal ghorite ekhon onek raat		Bengali	-	-	-
1980	Dharanir pothe pothe		Bengali	Salil Chowdhury	Salil Chowdhury	-
1956	Dheere chalo zara with Lata Mangeshkar	Aas Ki Panchhi; Dir: Mohan Kumar	Hindi	Shankar – Jaikishen	-	Rajendra Kumar, Vyjayanthimala
1959	Dil leke ja te ho kahan with Kamal Barot	O Tera Kya Kahna; Dir: K. Parvez	Hindi	Kalyanji Virji Shah	Indeevar	Mehmood, Chitra, Helen
1956	Dil mera ek aas ka panchhi	Aas Ki Panchhi	Hindi	Shankar – Jaikishen	-	Rajendra Kumar, Vyjayanthimala
-	Dur diganta dheke achhe meghe	-	Bengali	-		-
1981	Dustara paarabaar	-	Bengali	Salil Chowdhury	Salil Chowdhury	-
1968	E jeno sei chokh		Bengali	Abhijit Banerjee	Abhijit Banerjee	-
-	E raat nibir holo		Bengali	-	-	-
-	Ei ujjwalo din daake swapno rangeen	-	Bengali	Salil Chowdhury	Salil Chowdhury	-
-	Ek rash elo chul		Bengali			-
1957	Eto sur aar eto gaan	Puja Album	Bengali	Sudhin Dasgupta	Sudhin Dasgupta	-
1964	Gagan ke chanda na poochh humse with Lata Mangeskar	Apne Huye Paraye; Ajit Chakraborty	Hindi	Shankar – Jaikishen	-	Manoj Kumar & Mala Sinha
1960	Gar tum bura na mano with Asha Bhonsle	Mehlon ke khwab Dir: Muhafiz Haider	Hindi	S. Mohinder	Raja Mehdi Ali Khan	Pradeep Kumar & Madhubala
1959	Gori tere natkhat naina with Geeta Dutt	Hum Bhi Insaan Hain	Hindi	Hemanta Mukherjee	Shailendra	-
-	Haajar golap ghirechhilo more	-	Bengali	Subir Sen	Anup Chatterjee	-
-	Haate sob Haat-Ghori bandha	-	Bengali	Subir Sen		-
1968	Hoyto tomar anek khoti korechhi	Album "Eto Sur Ar Eto Gaan"	Bengali	Abhijit Banerjee	Abhijit Banerjee	-
1960	Humein yun rahon par chalna hai with Aratu Mukherjee	Masoom; Dir: Satyen Bose	Hindi	Rabin Banerjee	Raja Mehdi Ali Khan	Sarosh Irani, Aziz, Honey Irani
1981	Jaanina jaanina kon sagorer dheu	-	Bengali	Salil Chowdhury	Salil Chowdhury	-
-	Jaar alo nive gechhe	-	Bengali	Prabir Mazumder	Prabir Mazumder	-
-	Jakhan haat baralei akash	-	Bengali	Abhijit Banerjee	Babu Guhathakurata	-
1969	Jayse pani chhupa ghata mein with Lata Mangeskar	Bandhan; Dir: Narendra Bedi	Hindi	Kalyanji–Anandji		Rajesh Khanna, Mumtaz, Jeevan
-	Je buke tomar byatha chhilo	-	Bengali	Subir Sen	Kumar Bishwarup	-
1954	Jiban baati niviye	-	Bengali	Chitta Roy	Shyamal Gupta	Columbia Records (GE24715)
-	Kalo meghe dambaru	-	Bengali	Bhupen Hazarika	Pulak Bandyopadhyay	-
1962	Kasam na lijiye with Purnima Sett	Jadu Mahal; Dir: Akkoo	Hindi	Bulo C Rani	-	Helen, Ajit, Azad, Hiralal
1965	Ki bhalo laglo chokhe	-	Bengali	Sudhin Dasgupta	Sunil Baran	
1981	Kichhudin pore ar	-	Bengali	Salil Chowdhury	Salil Chowdhury	-
-	Kichhu phul diye aaj	-	Bengali	Anal Chatterjee	Shyamal Gupta	
1972	Koi mera ho gaya	Midnight; Dir: Raju	Hindi	Subir Sen	Tajdar Taj	
1981	Kono bhalo kobitar duti ponkti dao	-	Bengali	Salil Chowdhury	Salil Chowdhury	-
1989	Konodin tumi aar gaibe na	-	Bengali	-	-	In memory of Hemanta Mukherjee after his death
1962	Kya kaha jara phir kaho with Geeta Dutt	Gangu	Hindi	Kalyanji – Anandji	Qamar Zalalabadi or Prem Dhawan	Chandrashekhar and Naaz
-	Lal dopati o phul tomar	-	Bengali	-	-	-
1959	Main rangeela pyar ki rahi with Lata Mangeskar & Ameen Sayani	Chhoti Bahen	Hindi	Shankar – Jaikishen	Hasrat Jaipuri	Balraj Sahni, Nanda, Shyama
1957	Manzil wohi hai pyar ki	Kathputli	Hindi	Shankar – Jaikishen	Shailendra	Vyjayanthimala and Balraj Sahni
1967	Monalisa tumi ke balona	-	Bengali	Abhijit Banerjee	Abhijit Banerjee	-
-	Nagar jiban chhobir maton hoyto	-	Bengali	Abhijit Banerjee	Amiyo Dasgupta	-
1966	Noy thakle aro kichhukhon	-	Bengali	Abhijit Banerjee	Gauriprasanna Mazumder	-
1981	Odhikar ke kake dey	-	Bengali	Salil Chowdhury	Salil Chowdhury	-
1964	Ogo kajol noyona	Momer Alo	Bengali	Robin Chatterjee	-	Subir Sen, Sabitri Chattopadhyay, Uttam Kumar
-	Ogo Shakuntola	-	Bengali	Bhupen Hazarika	Pulak Bandyopadhyay	-
-	Oi ujjwalo din daake swapno rongin	-	Bengali	Sudhin Dasgupta	Sudhin Dasgupta	-
1981	Pagol Haowa aamar mato tumio hariye gele		Bengali	Salil Chowdhury	Salil Chowdhury	2126-3115
1969	Phaguner daak elo je with Sandhya Mukherjee	Aparichito; Dir" Salil Datta	Bengali	Robin Chatterjee	-	-
-	Phis phis bon jhau	-	Bengali	-	-	-
1989	Phooler bagicha hote sera phul	-	Bengali	Buddhadeb Gangopadhyay	Shyamal Sengupta	In memory of Hemanta Mukherjee after his death
1989	Poth je ekhono baki	-	Bengali	-	-	-
1959	Pyar mein milna sanam with Lata Mangeskar	Ardhangini	Hindi	Vasant Desai	Majrooh Sultanpuri	Raj Kumar & Meena Kumari
-	Raat holo nijhum	-	Bengali	-	Gauriprasanna Mazumder	-
-	Sandhya logone swapno magane	-	Bengali	Abhijit Banerjee	Shyamal Ghosh	-
1967	Saradin tomay bhebe	-	Bengali	Abhijit Banerjee	Abhijit Banerjee	-
1971	Sedin dujone dulechhinu bone	Anubhav; Dir: Basu Bhattacharya	Rabindra Sangeet in Hindi movie	Rabindranath Tagore	Rabindranath Tagore	Subir Sen as guest artist, with Sanjeev Kumar
-	Shato barsho ki tar-o besi kichhi aage	-	Bengali	Salil Chowdhury	Salil Chowdhury	
-	Siri uthe gechhe dhaape dhaape	-	Bengali	-	-	-
-	Sudhu sei gaane aaji	-	Bengali	-	-	-
1981	Sukher bandhan jei na chukalam	-	Bengali	Salil Chowdhury	Salil Chowdhury	-
1961	Sun le dastaan yun na sata	Passport; Dir: Pramode Chakravorty	Hindi	Kalyanji – Anandji	-	Pradeep Kumar, Madhubala
-	Sundar kichhu dekhle pore	-	Bengali	-	-	-
-	Swarna jhora surya ronge	-	Bengali	Sudhin Dasgupta	Sudhin Dasgupta	-
1962	Thaam mujhe gir na jaaoon	Raaz Ki Baat; Dir: Bolton Ci Nagi	Hindi	Rabin Banerjee	Hairat Sitapuri	Agha, Abhi Bhattacharya, Mohan Choti
1957	Tomar haasi lukiye haase	-	Bengali	Sudhin Dasgupta	Anal Chatterjee	-
1957	Tomar shishir bheja	-	Bengali	Anal Chattopadhyay	Samir Deb	-
-	Tomare peyechhi bole	-	Bengali	-	-	-
-	Tomay peyechhi aami	-	Bengali	Sailen Mukherjee	Indrajit	-
1966	Tomra amar gaan shune aaj	-	Bengali	Abhijit Banerjee	Gauriprasanna Mazumder	-
-	Tumi amar prem	-	Bengali	Abhijit Banerjee	Miltu Ghosh	-
1964	Tumi bolechhile	-	Bengali	Abhijit Banerjee	Shibdas Bandopadhyay / or/ Amiyo Dasgupta	-
1968	Yeh pukar kiske liye geet banke with Suman Kalyanpur	Rani Chandrawati	Hindi	S N Tripathi		Lalita Pawar

Rabindra Sangeet by Subir Sen

Subir Sen Discography
Song	Co-singer	Album
Asa Jaoar Pother Dhare	Purabi Mukhopadhyay	Nabin Megher Sur by SAREGAMA
O dekhbi re bhai ay re chhute	-	-
Sedin dujone dulechhinu bone	-	Anubhav (1971)
