= Desh Premee =

- Desh Premee poster
- Directed by: Manmohan Desai
- Written by: Kader Khan; K.B. Pathak; Prayag Raj
- Produced by: Subhash Desai
- Starring: Amitabh Bachchan; Hema Malini; Navin Nischol; Parveen Babi; Shammi Kapoor; Premnath; Uttam Kumar; Kader Khan; Prem Chopra; Parikshit Sahni; Amjad Khan; Sharmila Tagore
- Cinematography: Peter Pereira
- Edited by: Mukhtar Ahmed
- Music by: Laxmikant-Pyarelal
- Production company: S.S. Movietone
- Release date: 23 April 1982
- Running time: 165 mins
- Country: India
- Language: Hindi
- Budget: ₹30 million
- Box office: ₹72 million

Desh Premee (transl. The Patriot) is a 1982 Hindi action film directed by Manmohan Desai, starring Amitabh Bachchan in a dual role alongside Hema Malini, Sharmila Tagore, Navin Nischol, Parveen Babi, Uttam Kumar, Shammi Kapoor, Premnath, Parikshit Sahni, Amjad Khan and Gita Siddharth. The film has musical score by Laxmikant-Pyarelal.

It was the fifth collaboration of Manmohan Desai and Amitabh Bachchan. The film fell short of the standards of the previous films by this duo garnering mixed reviews and becoming a moderate success at the box office. It did celebrate silver jubilee in Hyderabad.

The film is dedicated to the memory of Mohammed Rafi, who sang the film's title song and key cast member Uttam Kumar, both of whom died a little before the film was released. This was the only film for which music director Laxmikant Shantaram Kudalkar was a playback singer for a song. All the songs were penned by Anand Bakshi.

== Synopsis ==
Master Dinanath is a freedom fighter and participated in the war against the British in 1942 and independence was eventually won in 1947. But after independence, the people's love for their country seems to be diminishing and they are too busy betraying it like ex British landlord Thakur Pratap Singh. In 1967 Master Dinanath finds out about Thakur Pratab Singh's illegal activities such as smuggling of weapons and ammunition and gets him arrested. In revenge for putting him in prison, Pratap Singh gets Master Dinanath's wife Bharati and daughter Priti kidnapped by Thakur's partner in crime Sher Singh to try to change his ways but, to no avail. Thakur also provokes an attack on Masterji's home by the local villagers, who accuse Dinanath of betraying his country and he is forced to flee his home with his young son Raju. His wife becomes a victim of leprosy and escapes from Sher Singh, leaving her daughter Priti in a friend's care. Masterji is informed that his wife and daughter could be dead as they find a necklace of hers near the train tracks. Masterji is devastated by his wife and daughter's loss and he and his son move on with their life.

They settle into a slum called Bharat Nagar, which is divided into four sections with a don in each of different backgrounds: Punjabi, a Tamilian. Bengali and Muslim. All of them love their own section, but nobody thinks of themselves as Indian except Masterji. Masterji tries to bring peace between the four dons and once they settle their differences, the four underworld dons use the Masterji's stay in Bharat Nagar to cover up their own illegal activities.

15 years later in 1982, Masterji's now grown-up son Raju turns out to be the opposite of his father. He starts working for Thakur Pratap Singh, unaware that Thakur had once kidnapped his mother and sister. Will Raju find out what Thakur did to his family? Will Master Dinanath find out his son is not who he thinks he is? and will Master ever find his wife and daughter again?

== Cast ==
- Amitabh Bachchan as Master Dinanath and Raju (dual role as father and son)
- Hema Malini as Asha
- Sharmila Tagore as Bharati (Master's wife)
- Parveen Babi as Dr. Preeti (Master's daughter)
- Navin Nischol as Inspector Deepak Singh
- Uttam Kumar as Ghosh Babu
- Shammi Kapoor as Shamsher Singh
- Amjad Khan as Thakur Pratap Singh
- Premnath as Puthu Anna
- Parikshat Sahni as Ghulam Ali
- Prem Chopra as Don
- Kader Khan as Sher Singh
- Jagdish Raj as Retired Major
- Sudha Chopra as Shamsher Singh's wife
- Geeta Siddharth
- Jeevan as Munim
- Yusuf Khan as Thakur Pratap Singh's aide
- Shivraj
- Gurbachan Singh

This is one of the last films of legendary actor Uttam Kumar who died during the filming. Actor Sudhir Dalvi has given a voice over to Uttam Kumar. "Mere Desh Premiyon" became his last song by Mohammad Rafi for a Manmohan Desai film. Manmohan Desai and Mohammed Rafi, with Laxmikant Pyarelal's music, created a magical era of music in Bollywood movies. Shammi Kapoor acted in a supporting role in the movie and had no songs to sing.

The music of the movie was fairly popular. Two Kishore Kumar songs and one Mohammed Rafi song were pictured on Amitabh Bachchan. "Khatoon Ki Khidmat Mein" was influenced by "Hum Kaale To Kya Hua Dilwale Hain" from Gumnaam. For this song, Amitabh Bachchan also dressed and acted like Mehmood, on whom that song was picturized. Laxmikant sang "Gore Nahin Hum Kaale Sahi", a duet with Asha Bhosle, and his voice was used on both Amitabh Bachchan and Prem Chopra. Bhosle sang for Hema Malini. Navin Nischol had one song and Amit Kumar sang for him, a duet with Kishore Kumar "Jaa Jaldi Bhaag Jaa".

The movie celebrated a golden jubilee in Hyderabad Ramakrishna 70MM theatres, and was hugely successful on re-release in the 1980s and 1990s.

== Soundtrack ==
Song	Singer
"Khatoon Ki Khidmat Mein"	Kishore Kumar
"Ja, Jaldi Bhag Ja, Nahin Baba Nahin"	Kishore Kumar, Amit Kumar
"Mere Desh Premiyon"	Mohammed Rafi
"Jao Ji Jao"	Lata Mangeshkar
"O Bekhabar Bedardi"	Lata Mangeshkar
"Gore Nahin Hum Kale Sahi"	Asha Bhosle, Laxmikant
