= Jabeen =

Jabeen is a Hindic name that may refer to the following notable people:

Given name

- Jabeen Jalil, Indian actress

Surname

- Fareeha Jabeen, Pakistani actress
- Khursheed Jabeen (born 1979), Pakistani cricketer
- Mah Jabeen Sharan, Pakistani politician
- Mahe Jabeen (born 1961), Indian poet, lawyer and minority rights activist
- Shaista Jabeen, Pakistani television actress

== See also ==
- Jabin
