= Prisoner of Golconda =

- Directed by: Prem Nath
- Written by: Prem Nath
- Produced by: P. N. Films
- Starring: Prem Nath; Bina Rai
- Music by: Datta Davjekar
- Release date: 1954
- Country: India
- Language: Hindi

Prisoner of Golconda, also known as Golconda Ka Qaidi, is a 1954 Indian Hindi-language film directed by Prem Nath, who was also the film's producer and leading actor. Other cast of the film includes Bina Rai, Agha, and Rajendra Nath. A Gevacolor production under the banner of P. N. Films, Prisoner of Golconda is based on Tana Shah (Abul Hasan Qutb Shah) and his eight-month imprisonment by Aurangzeb. The film's soundtrack was composed by Datta Davjekar, who introduced Nath as a singer, and proved a breakthrough for the lyricist Anjaan.

Prisoner of Golconda was released in Bombay in August 1954, and was well received in a review published in The Times of India, which praised the "fine portrayals, beautiful colour and photography".

== Censorship and release ==
Prisoner of Golconda became the subject of a censorship dispute during its production. Prem Nath wrote the story after studying British jail records on the treatment of political prisoners and based the film on a political activist imprisoned during the Indian independence movement. Although the censors initially approved the screenplay, they later ordered several cuts after the film was completed. Nath appealed the decision, and the Revision Committee permitted the film after further cuts, including the removal of scenes depicting excessive violence.

Before the film's release, Information and Broadcasting Minister B. V. Keskar ordered a private screening in New Delhi and subsequently withheld permission for its release, reportedly objecting to its depiction of the treatment of freedom fighters. Nath challenged the decision in the Bombay High Court, but his petition was dismissed. The dispute attracted protests from the film industry, and actor Prithviraj Kapoor, then a member of the Rajya Sabha, intervened with the ministry. Keskar eventually permitted the film's release in April 1954, after which the film reached theatres following the delay.
