= Jeevan Ek Sanghursh =

1990 Indian film directed by Rahul Rawail

- Poster
- Directed by: Rahul Rawail
- Written by: Javed Akhtar
- Screenplay by: Javed Akhtar
- Produced by: D. Rama Naidu
- Starring: Raakhee; Anil Kapoor; Madhuri Dixit
- Cinematography: K.S. Prakash Rao
- Edited by: K. A. Marthand
- Music by: Laxmikant–Pyarelal
- Production company: Suresh Productions
- Release date: 3 August 1990
- Running time: 160 minutes
- Country: India
- Language: Hindi

Jeevan Ek Sanghursh (transl. Life is a Struggle) is a 1990 Bollywood film directed by Rahul Rawail, produced by D. Rama Naidu. It stars Raakhee, Anil Kapoor and Madhuri Dixit in the leading roles. The film was successful and was the tenth highest-grossing Bollywood film of 1990. By titling this film as Jeevan Ek Sanghursh, Rawail paid a tribute to his father's (H. S. Rawail) films; Sunghursh (1968), based on a novel written by the Bengali author Mahashweta Devi.

== Plot ==
Widowed Sulakshana Devi (Raakhee) has three children: two sons, Arjun (Kanwaljit Singh) and Karan, and a daughter, Suman (Shehnaz Kudia). They live in a rented house, and the landlord behaves badly with Sulakshana Devi and robs her of all her money. Karan decides to rob the landlord but gets caught and is sent to the children's remand home. Sulakshana Devi decides to visit Karan before they leave for Mumbai, but realises that he ran away from the remand home. Karan also makes his way to Mumbai, where he is picked up by a garage owner.

During a roadside fight, grown-up Karan (Anil Kapoor) is caught by the police and is offered to work for Devraj Kamat (Anupam Kher), a criminal mastermind. Karan refuses the offer, but Kamat informs his rival Rattan Dholakia (Paresh Rawal). Rattan frames Karan for the murder of a police officer, but he is freed by Kamat when he agrees to work with him. Karan tries to meet his family through Arjun (Kanwaljit Singh) and Suman (Shehnaz Kudia), but Sulakshana Devi refuses to accept him. Various incidents lead Karan to meet and fall in love with Madhu (Madhuri Dixit), and he decides to leave the underworld. However, Kamat and Dholakia join hands to destroy Karan, as he was a critical part of their underworld operations.

== Cast ==
- Raakhee as Sulakshana Devi
- Anil Kapoor as Karan Kumar
- Madhuri Dixit as Madhu Sen
- Anupam Kher as Devraj Kamat
- Paresh Rawal as Rattan Dholakia
- Moon Moon Sen as Shivani
- Pankaj Dheer as Mahesh Dholakia
- Kanwaljit Singh as Arjun Kumar
- Shehnaz Kudia as Suman
- Abhinav Chaturvedi as Vinod
- Chandrashekhar Dubey as Roop Chand
- Mangal Dhillon as Police Inspector Gill

== Soundtrack ==
All lyrics are written by Javed Akhtar; all music is composed by Laxmikant–Pyarelal

No.	Title	Singer(s)	Length
1.	"Jeevan Ek Sanghursh Hai — I"	Mohammed Aziz, Kavita Krishnamurthy	6:00
2.	"Mil Gayee O Mujhe Mil Gayee"	Amit Kumar, Alka Yagnik	5:13
3.	"Bach Ke Tu Jayegi Kahan"	Amit Kumar, Kavita Krishnamurthy	6:00
4.	"He Baba Re Baba"	Amit Kumar, Kavita Krishnamurthy	6:54
5.	"Husn Ki Malika Main"	Amit Kumar, Kavita Krishnamurthy	5:00
6.	"Jeevan Ek Sanghursh Hai — II"	Mohammed Aziz, Kavita Krishnamurthy	3:13
Total length:			32:20
