= Lahren (film) =

- Directed by: H. S. Rawail
- Produced by: C. Ramchandra
- Starring: Kishore Kumar; Shyama
- Music by: C. Ramchandra
- Release date: 1953
- Country: India
- Language: Hindi

Lahren is a 1953 Indian Hindi-language film directed by H. S. Rawail. It was produced by C. Ramchandra, who also composed the soundtrack. The film featured Kishore Kumar, Shyama, Shakuntala, Om Prakash, Bipin Gupta, Leela Mishra, and Sunder.

The film also featured a special appearance by Raj Kapoor as a character named Shree 420, predating Kapoor's 1955 film of the same name.

Lahren premiered at Imperial Theatre, Bombay, on 16 October 1953, with a Times of India critic describing it as "rollicking entertainment". The film was reportedly a commercial success.

A phrase used in the film, "Duniya Gol Hai", became popular and was subsequently used as the title of Ramchandra's next production, Duniya Gol Hai (1955).
