= Hum Dono (1985 film) =

1985 Indian film

- Promotional poster
- Directed by: B.S. Glaad
- Screenplay by: B.S. Glaad
- Story by: S. L. Kalyani
- Produced by: Tony Glaad; Fruitee Glaad; Manmohan Glaad; Preeti Glaad; Smt. Satwant Glaad
- Starring: Rajesh Khanna; Hema Malini; Reena Roy
- Cinematography: G. Or. Nathan
- Edited by: B. S. Glaad
- Music by: R. D. Burman
- Release date: 22 March 1985
- Running time: 155 minutes
- Country: India
- Language: Hindi

Hum Dono (transl. Both of Us) is a 1985 Indian Hindi-language action comedy film directed by B. S. Glaad, starring Rajesh Khanna, Hema Malini, Reena Roy in lead roles, along with Johnny Walker, Premnath and Om Shivpuri in supporting roles. The music is by R. D. Burman, lyrics by Anand Bakshi and the songs are sung by Kishore Kumar, Asha Bhosle and Anuradha Paudwal. The movie ran silver jubilee at many centers. The most popular song from the film on its release was "Sunle Zameen Aasmaan". The film was a remake of the Telugu film Sommokadidi Sokokadidi.

In the film, a successful doctor is replaced by his lookalike. The two men eventually realize that they are twin brothers, and cooperate against the doctor's kidnappers.

== Plot ==
Raja discovers that his face is similar to that of Dr. Shekhar, one of the top earning doctors of Bombay. He somehow manages to take his place, but discovers that even Dr. Shekhar has problems of his own. Dr. Shekar also discovers that he has a lookalike and goes to find him at his home. When he visits Raja's home, Dr. Shekar falls in love with a girl. Shekhar and Raja are revealed to be identical twins who were separated at birth. Some goons kidnap Shekhar for money, but the brothers defeat the villains and are reunited.

== Cast ==
- Rajesh Khanna as Raja / Dr. Shekhar (double role)
- Hema Malini as Lata
- Reena Roy as Rani
- Johnny Walker as Micheal
- Shiv Raj as Lata's Father
- Iftekhar as Seth Mathura Das
- Om Shivpuri as Blackbird "Boss"
- Prem Nath as Iftekhar's friend
- Yunus Parvez
- Keshto Mukharji Rani's Father

== Soundtrack ==
No.	Title	Singer(s)	Length
1.	"Josh-E-Jawani Tauba"	Kishore Kumar
2.	"Tu Lajawab, Bemisal, Dilbar Yaar, Dilbar Jani"	Kishore Kumar, Asha Bhosle
3.	"Sunle Zameen Aasman, Sunle Yeh Sara Jahan"	Kishore Kumar, Asha Bhosle
4.	"Doctorbabu Doctorbabu"	Asha Bhosle
5.	"O Raja, Aaja Mere Paas"	Anuradha Paudwal Rupesh Kumar SUdha Shivpuri
