= Shagufa =

- Directed by: H. S. Rawail
- Starring: Prem Nath; Bina Rai
- Music by: C. Ramchandra
- Release date: 1953
- Country: India
- Language: Hindi

Shagufa is a 1953 Indian Hindi-language film directed by H. S. Rawail. Produced under the banner of P. N. Films, the film stars Prem Nath and Bina Rai. It features a soundtrack composed by C. Ramchandra.

Nath's original choice for the leading lady was Madhubala, who filmed Shafuga for a brief period in 1952 before she quit and was replaced by Rai. Shagufa was theatrically released in 1953 and was poorly received by critics; a reviewer for Trend dismissed the leading actors as "neurotic" and "chaotic."
