= Saranga (1961 film) =

1961 film from India

- Directed by: Dhirubhai Desai
- Produced by: Dhirubhai Desai, Kanjibhai Rathod
- Starring: Sudesh Kumar; Jayshree Gadkar
- Cinematography: Soumendu Roy
- Edited by: Bhaidas Kewalram
- Music by: Sardar Malik
- Release date: 1961
- Country: India
- Language: Hindi

Saranga, is a 1961 Bollywood film starring Sudesh Kumar and Jayshree Gadkar, and directed by Dhirubhai Desai, produced by Dhirubhai Desai and Kanjibhai Rathod.

== Cast ==
- Jayshree Gadkar as Saranga
- Sudesh Kumar as Prince Sadabaksh
- B. M. Vyas as Nagar Seth
- Nilofar as Nagar Sethani
- Niranjan Sharma as Raja of Ambavati
- Sadiq as Gyanchand
- Jankidas as Nagar Seth's Munim
- Parsuram as Senapati
- Jaya Devi as Ganga Maa

== Soundtrack ==
All the film songs were composed by music director Sardar Malik and lyrics were penned by Bharat Vyas.

Song	Singer	Raga
"Haan Diwana Hoon Mein"	Mukesh	
"Saranga Teri Yaad Mein Nain Hue Bechain"	Mukesh	Kalyan
"Saranga Teri Yaad Mein Nain Hue Bechain"	Mohammad Rafi	Kalyan
"Piya Kaise Miloon"	Mohammad Rafi, Lata Mangeshkar	
"Likh De Piya Ka Naam"	Suman Kalyanpur	
"Aa Aaja Mere Saathi Aaja"	Mohammad Rafi, Asha Bhosle	
"Koi Ghar Aayega"	Lata Mangeshkar	
"Lagi Tumse Lagan"	Mukesh, Lata Mangeshkar	
"Na Ja Mere Saath"	Mohammad Rafi	
"Daiya Re Daiya Ek"	Lata Mangeshkar	
"Chali Re Chali Main"	Asha Bhosle	
