= Shri Chaitanya Mahaprabhu (film) =

- Directed by: Vijay Bhatt
- Written by: Pandit Girish
- Screenplay by: Dhruva Chatterjee
- Story by: Pandit Girish
- Produced by: Vijay Bhatt
- Starring: Bharat Bhushan; Durga Khote; Ameeta; Madan Puri
- Cinematography: V. N. Reddy
- Edited by: Pratap Dave
- Music by: R. C. Boral
- Production company: Prakash Pictures
- Distributed by: Prakash Pictures
- Release date: 11 December 1953
- Running time: 155 minutes
- Country: India
- Language: Hindi

Shri Chaitanya Mahaprabhu is a 1953 Hindi devotional biopic film produced and directed by Vijay Bhatt. The film's music was composed by R. C. Boral, with lyrics by Bharat Vyas. The director of photography was V. N. Reddy. Bharat Bhushan won the Filmfare Award for Best Actor for his portrayal of Chaitanya Mahaprabhu. Asha Parekh, having started her career as a child artist in 1952, and who went on to become a famous actress, was cast in a small role in this film. The starcast included Bharat Bhushan, Durga Khote, Ameeta, Asha Parekh, Ram Mohan, Madan Puri, Kanhaiyalal and B.M. Vyas.

The film was about the 15th century "medieval Vaishnav poet saint" and social reformer of Bengal, Chaitanya Mahaprabhu, whom many considered an Avatar of Krishna. He was himself a Krishna devotee who is revered and worshipped even today.

== Plot ==
Born under a Neem tree and hence also called Nimai, Vishvambar (Bharat Bhushan) is the second son of Jagannath Mishra and his wife Sachi Devi. Due to his fair colour, he is often referred to as Gaurang (Fair-coloured). The social milieu in the 15th century setting of the story is shown as being dismal, with hypocritical priests and oppressive rulers. He loses his father at an early age and the family faces hardships financially. Nimai completes his education and is an expert at debating with the local priests. He starts a school and marries Vishnupriya, daughter of Sanatan Misra who is the court priest. On his father's death anniversary he goes to Gaya to perform prayers for his father. There, he meets a saint called Ishvara Puri. He soon develops complete devotion to Krishna and starts chanting and singing his praises. His Radha and Krishna Bhakti (devotion) songs attract people from all walks of life. He takes renunciation and shaves his head. He settles in Puri, concentrating on his Bhakti and disappears while singing a bhajan. Dhananjay Bhattacharya sang in a wonderful and rich voice "Hari Hari Bol, Mukund Madhav Govind Bol".

== Cast ==
- Durga Khote
- Bharat Bhushan as Vishvambhar Mishra / Chaitanya Mahaprabhu
- Ameeta
- Kanhaiyalal
- Madan Puri
- B. M. Vyas
- Krishna Kumari
- Sulochana Chatterji
- Umakant

== Awards ==
Filmfare Award for Best Actor - Bharat Bhushan

== Soundtrack ==
The music was directed by R. C. Boral and lyrics by Bharat Vyas. The playback singers of the 16 (one repeat) songs were Mohammed Rafi, Lata Mangeshkar, Asha Bhosle, Talat Mehmood, Binota Chakraborty, Dhananjay Bhattacharya.

=== Songlist ===
| # | Title | Singer |
|---|---|---|
| 1 | "Preetmaye Sansar Pyare" | Talat Mehmood |
| 2 | "Sar Pe Gagariya Tirchi Najariya" | Lata Mangeshkar and chorus |
| 3 | "Woh Gokul Ka Gwala Tha" | Dhananjay Bhattacharya, Lata Mangeshkar |
| 4 | "Teri Preet Samajh Na Aaye" | Lata Mangeshkar |
| 5 | "Kya Ho Gaya Kya Mujhe Ho Gaya" | Talat Mehmood and chorus |
| 6 | "Band Huye Sawan Dwar Sabhi" | Dhananjay Bhattacharya |
| 7 | "Deen Bandhu Bhaav Sindhu Taarak" | Mohammed Rafi |
| 8 | "Gokul Ke Is Raas Ko Karne Chaknachur" | Asha Bhosle, Mohammed Rafi |
| 9 | "Kajrare Naina Chhup Chhup Ghaat Kare" | Lata Mangeshkar |
| 10 | "Baaje Muraliyaa Baaje, Sapane Hue Saanche" | Lata Mangeshkar |
| 11 | "Gokul Gaon Kadamb Ki Chhaon" | Mohammed Rafi |
| 12 | "Nimaayi Chand Gore Chand" | Binota Chakraborty |
| 13 | "Hari Hari Bol Mukund Madhav" | Dhananjay Bhattacharya |
| 14 | "Kanha Kanha Poonam Ki Raat Hai" | Asha Bhosle |
| 15 | "Yada Yada Hi Dharmasya Kahan Gaya Woh Vachan" | |
