= Saqi (film) =

1952 film by H. S. Rawail

- Theatrical release poster
- Directed by: H. S. Rawail
- Written by: Kamal Amrohi (dialogue); Anjana Rawail (story)
- Screenplay by: Anjana Rawail
- Story by: Anjana Rawail
- Based on: Arabian Nights
- Produced by: R. C. Talwar
- Starring: Madhubala; Prem Nath
- Cinematography: Rajendra Malone
- Music by: C. Ramchandra
- Release date: 1952
- Country: India
- Language: Hindi
- Budget: est. ₹1 million

Saqi (transl. "Bartender") is a 1952 Indian Hindi-language film directed by H. S. Rawail and starring Madhubala and Prem Nath. The film's music was composed by C. Ramchandra. Based on Arabian Nights, Saqi was one of the most expensive Indian films at the time of its release.

== Plot ==
The film told the story a common man named Ajeeb, who tries to woo the princess Rukhsana.

== Cast ==
- Madhubala as Rukhsana
- Prem Nath as Ajeeb
- Gope as Genie
- Randhir as Sultan
- Iftekhar as Abdul
- Bipin Gupta as Vazir
- Cuckoo Moray as the item number "Door Door Se"
- Mohana Cabral as Jalwa

== Production ==
Saqi was an Indian adaptation of Arabian Nights. The film's muhurat took place in late December 1950. It was announced in February 1951, along with Badal, also starring Madhubala and Prem Nath. It was estimatedly made on a budget of ₹10 lakhs.

The film was the last collaboration of Madhubala and Prem Nath. Eight years later, they planned to star in her production house venture, Pathan (released in 1962), but Madhubala fell sick and was replaced by Mumtaz.

== Soundtrack ==
Song	Singer
"Din Pehla"	Lata Mangeshkar
"Paas Na Aaiye"	Lata Mangeshkar
"Gham Ki Vadi Mein"	Lata Mangeshkar
"Khushi Se Door Hoon"	Lata Mangeshkar
"Kise Maloom Tha Ek Din Mohabbat Bezuban Hogi"	Lata Mangeshkar, Talat Mahmood
"Aa Gayi Hai Ishq Pe Bahar, Khatm Hua Intezar"	Lata Mangeshkar, Mohammed Rafi
"Mera Mizaj Ladakpan Se"	Mohammed Rafi
"O Haseena Sambhal Sambhalke Chal"	C. Ramchandra, Geeta Dutt
"Raat Suhani"	Shamshad Begum

== Release ==
The film premiered at Novelty Theatre on 22 February 1952.

== Reception ==
The Times of India reviewed the film on 8 March 1952. Writing for the April 1952 issue of Filmindia, Baburao Patel called Saqi "a monumental waste of money" and "a stupid and boring picture".

The film was a financial failure. Alongside other big-budget flops like Amar and Bahut Din Huwe (both 1954), the failure of Saqi reportedly led to Madhubala being labelled a "jinx" by producers in the early 1950s.
