= Kali Ghata (1951 film) =

- Directed by: Kishore Sahu
- Produced by: Hindustan Chitra
- Starring: Kishore Sahu; Bina Rai; Asha Mathur
- Music by: Shankar-Jaikishan
- Release date: 1951
- Country: India
- Language: Hindi

Kali Ghata (Hindi: काली घटा, "dark cloud") is a 1951 Hindi film directed by Kishore Sahu and starring Kishore Sahu, Bina Rai and Asha Mathur.

== Cast ==
- Asha Mathur
- Bina Rai
- Kishore Sahu

== Music ==
The music was scored by Shankar Jaikishan . Lyrics were written by Hasrat Jaipuri and Shailendra

Song title	Singers	Lyricist
"Ille Belle Aare, Din Hain Pyaare Pyaare...Aise Men Tu Aa Jaa Re"	Lata Mangeshkar	Shailendra
"Dil Mein Tu Mere Dil Mein Tu"	Lata Mangeshkar	Hasrat Jaipuri
"Humse na poocho koi pyaar kya hai"	Lata Mangeshkar	Hasrat Jaipuri
"Maine kya kya sitam"	Lata Mangeshkar	Hasrat Jaipuri
"Unke sitam ne loot liya haay kya karein"	Lata Mangeshkar	Hasrat Jaipuri
"O Kaali Ghata Ghir Aayi Re (Madhur Milan Hai Sajna)"	Lata Mangeshkar Mohd. Rafi	Hasrat Jaipuri
Title Music		
