= Mahe Jabeen =

Indian writer (born 1961)

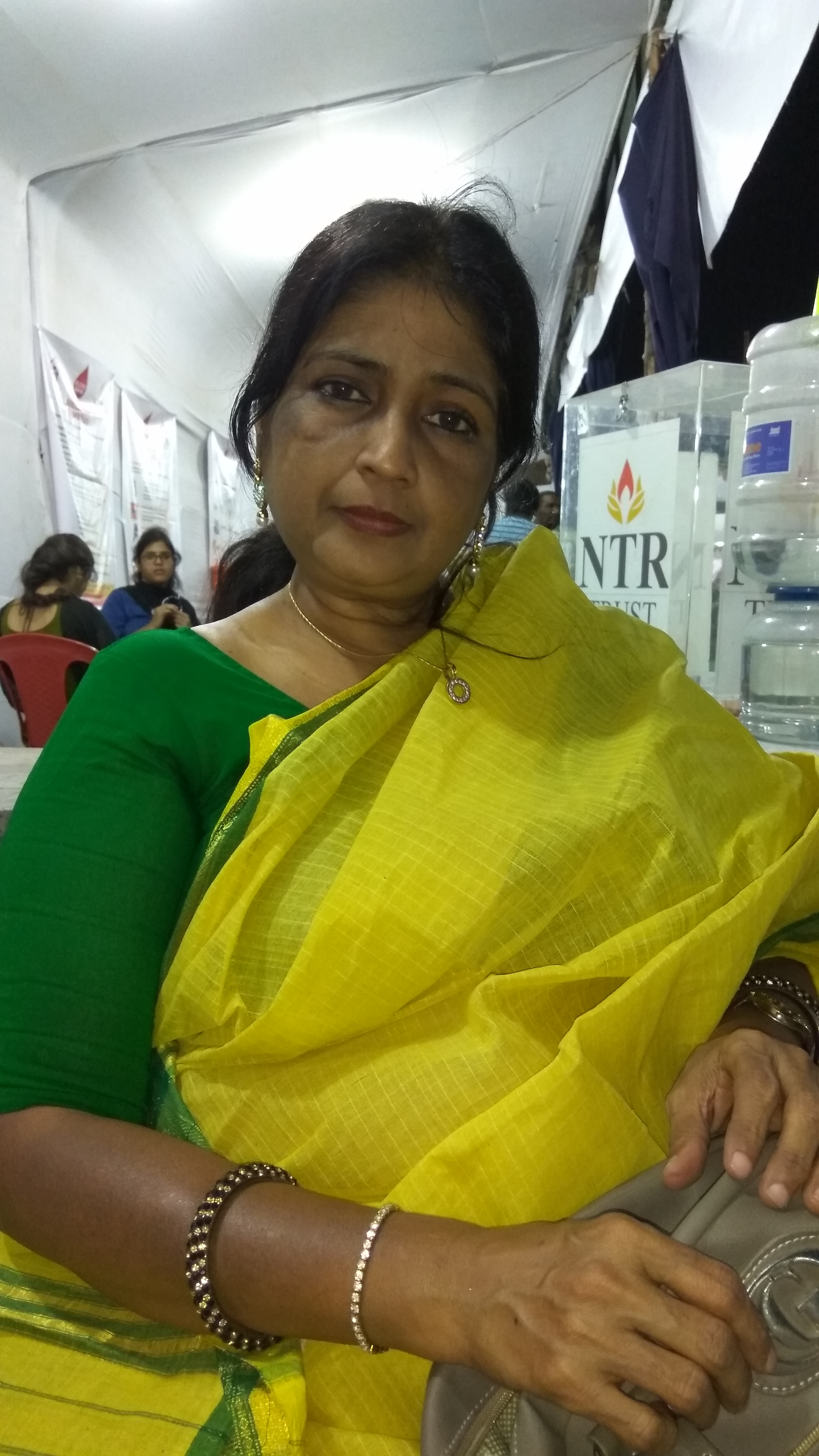
- Born: 1961 (age 64–65); Nellore, Andhra Pradesh, India
- Occupation: Poet
- Writing career
- Notable awards: Rajiv Gandhi Manav Seva Award

Mahe Jabeen (born 1961) is an Indian poet, lawyer and minority rights activist, and a winner of the Rajiv Gandhi Manav Seva Award for her social service.

== Early life ==
Maha Jabeen Mohammed, better known as Mahe Jabeen was born in 1961 in Nellore in a Muslim family. Her father was a District court lawyer. Her mother worked as part-time teacher in Government social welfare hostel. Faced with poverty, she got elementary education from Christian missionary school with the aid from poor children fund.

== Academics ==
She got her undergraduate with specialization in child psychology from S. V. University, Tirupati in 1985 and master's degree with specialization in woman and child welfare from Sri Padmavathi Women's University, Tirupati in 1987. She earned a Postgraduate diploma in Human Rights in 1999 from the University of Hyderabad. She completed L.L.B. with specialization in women rights from Osmania University, Hyderabad in 2002.

== Human rights activist ==
Jabeen is program secretary of the Andhra Pradesh chapter of Joint Women's Program, an Indian Women's Organization. She organizes workshops and training programs on issues like dowry harassment, marital problems, domestic violence, and short-term shelter to women. She also organizes public gatherings on environmental issues, women's political rights and other gender related issues. Mahe Jabeen is also secretary of the Phoenix Organization for Woman and Child. As part of the organization, she prepares awareness materials and skits on issues relating to minority women and children, and directs street plays. She also practices as lawyer in Hyderabad high court and provides free legal aid to minorities. Mahe also hosted the legal awareness and advice and family counseling program Chetana for women through Doordarshan, the Government TV channel. Mahe also campaigns for the effective implementation of Child Labor (Abolition) Laws. With coordination with the office of the State Labor Commissioner in identifying the child labor in urban spaces, she organizes awareness talks and publishes the articles in media.

== Writer ==
She published several poems in the publications of Kendreya Sahitya Akademi. Her poems were also included in Neeli Meghalu, a feminist poetry anthology edited by Volga and other authors in 1995. Her themes include gender discrimination, human rights, ethnic studies, peoples movements, Muslim and naxal minority problems and feminism. Besides writing poems, she writes articles on these issues for various Indian magazines. One of her poems, ‘street children’ is included in the curriculum for class X by the Board of Secondary Education in Andhra Pradesh State

== Awards ==
- Telugu Bhasha Puraskaram in 2009 from Adhikara Bhasha Sangham of Andhra Pradesh State Government, India.
- Stree Shakti Puraskar Kannagi award 2008 from the Government of India.
- Rajiv Gandhi Manav Seva Award from the Ministry of Women & Child Development, Government of India for the year 2007 for working on child rights issues in India for more than a decade.
