= Chhote Nawab =

- Poster
- Directed by: S.A. Akbar
- Written by: Mumtaz Ali; B. H. Bukhari
- Produced by: Usman Ali
- Starring: Ameeta; Mehmood; Johnny Walker; Helen
- Edited by: Vitthal Bankar
- Music by: R. D. Burman
- Production company: Mumtaz Films
- Release date: 1961
- Running time: 142 minutes
- Country: India
- Language: Hindi
- Box office: est. ₹5.2 million

Chhote Nawab (transl. Little Master) is a 1961 Indian Hindi-language romantic comedy film written by Mumtaz Ali and directed by S. A. Akbar. Produced under Mumtaz Films, it stars Ameeta, Mehmood, Johnny Walker and Helen. It was released in 1961 and was " Hit" at the box office.

== Cast ==
- Ameeta as Roshan
- Mehmood as Chhote Nawab
- Johnny Walker as Captain
- Helen as Miss Sophie
- Minoo Mumtaz as Mehnuma
- Altaf as Safdar
- Anwar Hussain
- Nazir Hussain
- Achala Sachdev
- Bela Bose

== Production ==
The film was announced in 1961. The film also marks the debut for music director R. D. Burman.

== Music ==
Chhote Nawab

Soundtrack album by R.D. Burman
- Released: 1961
- Genre: Feature film soundtrack
- Length: 38:02
- Label: Saregama India
- Producer: R.D. Burman

R.D. Burman chronology
Chhote Nawab (1961)	Bhoot Bungla (1965)

The music was composed by R. D. Burman. The film is considered his breakthrough in Hindi cinema. Shailendra penned the lyrics for the songs. The film has following tracks:

Track listing
No.	Title	Singer(s)	Length
1.	"Ghar Aaja Ghir Aaye Badra" (Raga Malgunji)	Lata Mangeshkar	03:22
2.	"Matwali Ankhonwale"	Lata Mangeshkar, Mohammed Rafi	06:14
3.	"Jeenewale Muskura Ke Jee"	Lata Mangeshkar, Mohammed Rafi	03:14
4.	"Aaj Hua Mera Dil Matwala"	Lata Mangeshkar, Mohammed Rafi	05:38
5.	"Aam Chhum Taam Chhum"	Mohammed Rafi	03:44
6.	"Chura Ke Dil Ban Rahe Ho Bhole"	Lata Mangeshkar	03:35
7.	"Ilahi Tu Sun Le Hamari Dua"	Mohammed Rafi	06:11
8.	"Koi Aane Ko Hai Dil"	Mohammed Rafi, Shamshad Begum	03:20
9.	"Chhote Nawab"	R. D. Burman	02:27
Total length:			38:02

== Reception ==
=== Box office ===
Chhote Nawab was the nineteenth highest-grossing Indian film of 1961.

=== Critical response ===
The film is also considered a ”Shakti film” in which dance plays a prominent role in the shaping of female characters.
