= Sardar Malik =

Indian Music Composer

- Born: Sardar Mohammad Malik; 13 January 1930; Kapurthala, Punjab Province, British India
- Died: 27 January 2006 (aged 76) Mumbai, Maharashtra, India
- Genres: Indian classical music, Indian music
- Occupations: Film score composer, music director, singer
- Spouse: Bilqis (Hasrat Jaipuri's sister)

Sardar Mohammad Malik (13 January 1930 – 27 January 2006) was an Indian Hindi film music director and composer.

== Early life and career ==
Sardar Mohammad Malik was born on 13 January 1930 in Kapurthala, Punjab, British India. He first was a student at Uday Shankar's India Cultural Centre in Almora, Uttarkhand to learn dancing and singing. He became a trained choreographer in Kathakali, Manipuri and Bharatnatyam there. While at this institute, he also learned music from Ustad Allauddin Khan who also worked at the same centre.

In the late 1940s he came to Bombay, and was the music director for over 600 songs. He is known for his work for films Thokar (1953 film), Aulad (1954), Bachpan (1963 film), Maharani Padmini (1964 film), and especially his musical film Saranga (1961). Consequently, he became known as the 'Saranga man'.

== Death and legacy ==
Sardar Malik died on 27 January 2006 of massive cardiac arrest after prolonged illness with Parkinson's disease at age 76. Malik's wife, Bilqis, was the sister of lyricist Hasrat Jaipuri. The couple have three sons, Anu Malik, Daboo Malik and Abu Malik. All three of his sons have followed in their father's footsteps to become music directors in Bollywood.

According to a major newspaper of India, "In the 1960s, there was a composer known as the Saranga man. Today he is remembered as composer Anu Malik's father".

== Selected filmography ==
- Chalis Karod (1946) as a dance choreographer
- Raaz (1949 film)
- Laila Majnu (1953 film)
- Thokar (1953 film)
- Aulad (1954)
- Ab-E-Hayat (1955 film)
- Maan Ke Aansoo (1959)
- Mera Ghar Mere Bachche (1960)
- Saranga (1961)
- Bachpan (1963 film)
- Maharani Padmini (1964 film)
- Jantar Mantar (1964)
- Gyani Ji (1977) (Punjabi Film)
