= H. S. Rawail =

Indian filmmaker (1921–2004)

- Born: Harnam Singh Rawail; 21 August 1921; Lyallpur, Punjab Province, British India
- Died: 17 September 2004 (aged 83); Mumbai, Maharashtra, India
- Occupation: Film director
- Years active: 1940–1982
- Children: Rahul Rawail
- Relatives: Rajat Rawail (grandson)

Harnam Singh Rawail (21 August 1921 – 17 September 2004), often credited as H. S. Rawail, was an Indian filmmaker. He debuted as a director with the 1940 Bollywood film Dorangia Daku and is best known for romantic films like Mere Mehboob (1963), Sunghursh (1968), Mehboob Ki Mehndi (1971) and Laila Majnu (1976). His son Rahul Rawail and grandson Rajat Rawail (through daughter Roshni Rawail) are also film directors; the former paid tribute to his father's film Sunghursh by titling one of his films as Jeevan Ek Sanghursh (1990).

== Personal life and career ==
Rawail was born in Lyallpur, Punjab, British India and moved to Mumbai to aspire to be a filmmaker. Later, he moved to Kolkata where he wrote several film scripts and debuted as a director with Dorangia Daku (1940). His three consecutive films; Shukriya (1944), Zid (1945) and Jhoothi Kasmein (1948); were commercial failures. His next film Patanga (1949) was successful and was the seventh highest grossing Bollywood film of 1949. The film is still remembered for the song "Mere Piya Gaye Rangoon" performed by Shamshad Begum.

Later, Rawail's nine consecutive films from 1949 till 1956 did not perform well on the box office. In March 1956, Rawail started with two new projects, Chaalbaaz with Meena Kumari and Baazigar with Vyjayanthimala. Both the films were dropped eventually. However, in 1958 director Nanabhai Bhatt revived both projects starring Nirupa Roy. Rawail took a three-year sabbatical and returned in 1959 with a comedy film Shararat, starring Raaj Kumar, Kishore Kumar and Meena Kumari. The film was a commercial failure along with his next two films, Roop Ki Rani Choron Ka Raja (1961), starring Dev Anand and Waheeda Rehman and Kanch Ki Gudiya (1963) starring Manoj Kumar. However, Manoj Kumar did gain recognition from tae film after having starred in various unsuccessful films before.

Rawail's major success came with 1963 musical film Mere Mehboob starring Rajendra Kumar and Sadhana Shivdasani. Kumar had earlier worked as an assistant director to Rawail. The film was praised for Rawail's direction and is remembered for the title song composed by music director Naushad and performed by singers Mohammed Rafi and Lata Mangeshkar. His next film Sunghursh (1968) was based on a novel written by the Bengali author Mahashweta Devi. The film was set in the 19th century and showcased the lives of bandits. It was praised for the "exceptional performances" by its actors Dilip Kumar, Vyjayanthimala, Balraj Sahni, Sanjeev Kumar and Jayant. The actor-director Rakesh Roshan worked as an assistant director on the film.

His next film Mehboob Ki Mehndi (1971), featuring Rajesh Khanna and Leena Chandavarkar, performed well at the box office. The film was counted among the 17 consecutive hits of Khanna and was recognised for its music composed by Laxmikant–Pyarelal. Later his 1976 film Laila Majnu, starring Rishi Kapoor and Ranjeeta Kaur in lead roles, became a success. Rawail's last film as director Deedar-E-Yaar (1982) was a commercial failure after which he took a break from the film industry.

His son Rahul Rawail is also a film director and is best known for the films Love Story (1981), Betaab (1983), Arjun (1985) and Anjaam (1994). He paid tribute to his father's "best work" Sunghursh (1968) by titling one of his film as Jeevan Ek Sanghursh (1990). Rawail's grandson Bharat Rawail is an up-and-coming director, who recently assisted Yash Chopra for his last film, Jab Tak Hai Jaan (2012). Rawail died on 17 September 2004 at the age of 83 in Mumbai.

== Filmography ==
Year	Title	Director	Other
1940	Dorangia Daku	Yes	
1944	Shukriya	Yes	
1945	Zid	Yes	Cinematographer
1948	Jhoothi Kasmein	Yes	
1949	Patanga	Yes	
1949	Do Baatein	Yes	
1951	Sagai	Yes	
1951	Jawani Ki Aag	Yes	
1952	Saqi	Yes	
1953	Shagufa	Yes	
1953	Lahren	Yes	
1954	Mastana	Yes	
1955	Teerandaz	Yes	
1956	Pocket Maar	Yes	Writer
1959	Shararat	Yes	
1961	Roop Ki Rani Choron Ka Raja	Yes	
1961	Kanch Ki Gudiya	Yes	
1963	Mere Mehboob	Yes	Producer; Screenplay Writer
1968	Sunghursh	Yes	
1971	Mehboob Ki Mehndi	Yes	Producer
1976	Laila Majnu	Yes	Screenplay Writer
1982	Deedar-E-Yaar	Yes	
1987	Dacait		Presenter
1992	Bekhudi		Presenter
1994	Anjaam		Presenter

== Awards ==
National Film Awards

- 1963 – 11th National Film Awards – Certificate of Merit for the Second Best Feature Film – Mere Mehboob as both producer and director.

Bengal Film Journalists' Association Awards

- 1968 – 32nd Annual BFJA Awards – Fourth Best Indian Film – Sunghursh
