= Ameeta =

Indian actress

- Born: Qamar Sultana; Calcutta, British India
- Occupation: Actress
- Years active: 1953–1968

Ameeta (born as Qamar Sultana) is an Indian actress. She appeared in Hindi language films such as Tumsa Nahin Dekha, Mere Mehboob and Goonj Uthi Shehnai.

== Early life ==
Ameeta was born in Kolkata to a show-business family. Her mother was actress Shakuntala Devi who worked with the Corinthian Theatre Company of Kolkata, and was the sister of Pakistan's well-known actor Aslam Pervaiz. Ameeta suffered a tragic loss very early in her life when she was only one year old, her father Choudhary Riaz Ahmed died. Then, she and her mother shifted to Mumbai where she did her schooling at a boarding school.

== Career ==
=== Beginning ===
A fan of Madhubala, Ameeta was enacting her idol's sword fight from Baadal (1951) when she caught the eye of Lekhraj Bhakhri, who signed her for his movie Thokar starring Shammi Kapoor. This was her debut film in a side role where she was credited as Jayjaywanti. Ameeta's debut movie as heroine was a 1953 release, Shri Chaitanya Mahaprabhu, directed by Vijay Bhatt. The screen name Ameeta made its appearance in this movie. The film failed, but Ameeta kept on working in films like Amar Kirtan, Badal Aur Bijli, Baaghi Sardar and Indrasabha.

Her career took a positive turn in 1956 when she starred with her idol Madhubala in the box office hit Shirin Farhad. She was then chosen for lead roles in Abhimaan and Zamana and Hum Sab Chor Hain (1956) along with Shammi Kapoor and Nalini Jaywant.

=== Breakthrough ===
The turning point in Ameeta's career though came when she became the protégé of Filmistan Studios' owner Tolaram Jalan, who produced Tumsa Nahin Dekha (1957) opposite Shammi kapoor, as a vehicle for promoting Ameeta as a new star. Great care was taken with her make-up, wardrobe and lighting, to present her in the most flattering and advantageous way possible. Furthermore, much of the film's extensive publicity also centred on the actress. The film was a big success but Ameeta's thunder was stolen by the until then struggling Shammi Kapoor. This got her the female lead of Goonj Uthi Shehnai, a role originally intended for Asha Parekh, with whom she had acted earlier in Shri Chaitanya Mahaprabhu (1953). The film starred a then up-and-coming Rajendra Kumar and an exceptional music score went on to become one of the top-grossing films of 1959. Here despite a mature and sensitive performance, Ameeta was overlooked and Kumar was given credit for the film's emphatic success.

=== Later work ===
Although she kickstarted the careers of Shammi Kapoor and Rajendra Kumar with these hits, Ameeta could never capitalize on them and stardom never materialized.

Further roles in multi-star films like Rakhi (1962) and the blockbuster Mere Mehboob (1963) did not help her career graph, even though she was nominated for a Filmfare award for the latter as Best Supporting Actress, and she now dropped to playing lead grade-B movies which though successful at the box office did not do much for her star status. Her romance opposite Kishore Kumar in Hum Sab Ustad Hai in 1965 was her next role. By 1965 she was playing negative and villainous characters in films like Rishte Naate (1965), and Aasra (1966). She was seen in supporting roles to fledgling starlets Rajshree and Babita, in films like Around the World (1967) and Haseena Maan Jayegi (1968). After filming Haseena Maan Jayegi (1968), a disillusioned Ameeta left the film industry as she was not getting leading roles and settled into matrimony.

== Personal life ==
After she retired from the film world she married actor and director Kamran and had a daughter, Sabia (otherwise Sabeeha). Kamran is also biological father of Farah Khan and Sajid Khan. Sabia tried her hand in Hindi films as a lead actress in Anokha Rishta (1986) and Khiladi (1992) and 100 Days (1991) which were big hits of respective years, but her career never took off. She appeared in Qayamat Ki Raat (1992), before she too disappeared from the Hindi movie scene.

== Awards ==
Ameeta was nominated for a Filmfare Award as Best Supporting Actress for Mere Mehboob (1962) but lost out to Shashikala for Gumrah (1963). She came out of seclusion only once to accept the Lifetime Achievement Award by the Cine & TV Artistes Association on 20 November 2005 and then disappeared again.

== Filmography ==
Year	Title	Role	Notes
1950s to 1970s
1952	Anmol Sahara		
1952	Kafila		
1953	Shri Chaitanya Mahaprabhu		Debut film
1954	Amar Kirtan		
1955	Munimji	Bela	
1955	Ab-E-Hayat		
1956	Badal Aur Bijli		
1956	Baghi Sardar		
1956	Hum Sub Chor Hain	Fifi	
1956	Shirin Farhad	Shama	Breakthrough film
1957	Zamana		
1957	Abhimaan		
1957	Bada Bhai		
1957	Talash		
1957	Dekh Kabira Roya	Geeta	
1957	Tumsa Nahin Dekha	Meena	
1958	Hum Bhi Kuchh Kam Nahin		
1958	Raj Sinhasan		
1958	Sanskar		
1959	Goonj Uthi Shehnai	Gopi	
1959	Aangan		
1959	Maine Jeena Seekh Liya		
1959	Sawan	Badli	
1961	Chhote Nawab	Roshan	
1961	Pyase Panchhi		
1961	Piya Milan Ki Aas		
1961	Pyaar Ki Dastan		
1961	Ek Ladki Saat Ladke		
1961	Main Aur Mera Bhai		
1961	Lucky Number		
1961	Teen Ustad		
1962	Maa Beta		
1962	Raj Nandini		
1962	Rakhi	Malti Chandra	
1963	Mere Mehboob	Naseem Ara	
1963	Mummy Daddy		
1964	Samson		
1964	Punar Milan	Sona	
1965	Hum Sab Ustad Hain	Roopa	
1965	Rishte Naate	Roopa	
1965	Saath Samundar Paar		
1965	Namaste Ji		
1966	Aasra	Roopa	
1966	Kunwari		
1967	Around The World		
1968	Haseena Maan Jayegi	Lali	
1970	Inspector		
1971	Kabhi Dhoop Kabhi Chhaon		
1973	Mera Shikar		
