= Prem Nath =

Indian actor (1926–1992)

- Born: Prem Nath Malhotra; 21 November 1926; Peshawar, North-West Frontier Province, British India
- Died: 3 November 1992 (aged 65); Bombay, Maharashtra, India
- Occupations: Actor; film producer; director
- Years active: 1948–1985
- Organization: P. N. Films
- Spouse: Bina Rai (m. 1952)
- Children: 2, including Prem Krishen
- Relatives: Rajendra Nath (brother); Narendra Nath (brother); Raj Kapoor (brother-in-law); Prem Chopra (brother-in-law); Siddharth P. Malhotra (grandson)

Prem Nath Malhotra (21 November 1926 – 3 November 1992) was an Indian actor, producer, and director who worked predominantly in Hindi cinema. His first major role was in the Rajput drama Ajit (1948), which was one of the earliest colour films made in India. Nath gained wider recognition with the Raj Kapoor films Aag (1948) and Barsaat (1949) and subsequently headlined the adventure film Badal (1951), a commercial success. In 1952, he portrayed the antagonist Shamsher Singh in Mehboob Khan's swashbuckler Aan, a Technicolor production that was the highest-grossing Indian film at the time.

Nath appeared in over 100 films during a career spanning four decades. In a 1952 profile, author Sushila Rani Patel attributed Nath's success partly to his "cavalier-like looks" and described him as particularly effective in virile, Robin Hood-type roles. Nath continued to play leading roles through the 1950s and early 1960s, including Sagai (1951), Saqi (1952), Aurat (1953), Jagir (1959), Pathan (1962), and Rustom Sohrab (1963).

Besides acting, Nath ventured into film production under the banner of P. N. Films, which he founded with his actress-wife Bina Rai. Major productions by the company included Shagufa (1953) and Prisoner of Golconda (1954); the latter was also directed by him.

From the mid-1960s, Nath increasingly took on supporting and character roles, sometimes playing villains. He received four Filmfare Award nominations for Best Supporting Actor, for Shor (1972), Bobby (1973), Amir Garib and Roti Kapda Aur Makaan (both 1974). His other supporting roles included Teesri Manzil (1966), Johny Mera Naam (1970), Tere Mere Sapne (1971) and Karz (1980). Nath retired in 1985 after making his final screen appearance in Hum Dono.

== Early life ==
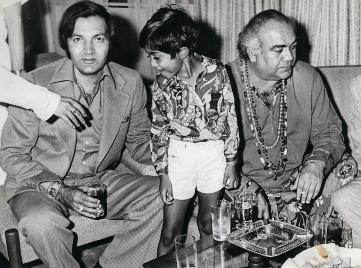
Nath (right) with actor Prem Chopra (left), who was his sister's husband

He was born on 21 November 1926 in the Karimpura locality, near Ghanta Ghar in Peshawar. He was the eldest born of his father Rai Bahadur Kartar Nath Malhotra was a high-ranking police officer whose frequent transfers led to his service across different Indian states. His father was also the maternal uncle of Prithviraj Kapoor, known as the patriarch of the Kapoor film clan. His family moved to Jubbulpore (present-day Jabalpur) after partition and he moved to Bombay where he was discovered as an actor.

== Acting career ==
=== Early roles and lead roles (1948 to mid-1960s) ===
Nath made his film debut in Ajit (1948) opposite Monica Desai, which was one of the first colour films. He was, however, seen on-screen for the first time in Daulat Ke Liye (1947). He got major roles in Raj Kapoor's first directorial film Aag (1948) and Barsaat (1949) which was his first major success.

In 1951, Nath starred opposite Madhubala in Amiya Chakravarty's Badal. The film begot mixed reviews — with a critic remarking that he was "very loud" in his portrayal — but Badal proved to be a box office success. Nath further worked with Madhubala in Aaram (1951) and Saqi (1952). Also in 1952, he co-starred with Dilip Kumar in the swashbuckling technicolour film Aan which was the highest grossing film at the time.

He went on to appear in many films in leading roles often opposite his wife Bina Rai which failed to do well. He set up a production company named P. N. Films and produced four films viz. Shagufa (1953), Golconda Ka Qaidi (Hindi) alias Prisoner of Golconda (English) (1954), Samundar (1957) and Sat Sri Akaal (Punjabi) (1976) alias Gyaani Ji (Hindi) (1977). Amongst this, he directed Golconda Ka Qaidi / Prisoner of Golconda and Samundar while he was the co-music director along with Sardar Malik in Sat Sri Akaal / Gyaani Ji besides being the second unit director and introducing himself as a singer in the film. His career as a leading man didn't achieve much success and steadily declined in the late 1950s. None of the films under P. N. Films banner performed well at the box office. He also made three documentaries which includes Kailash Darshan (1957). His English film Prisoner of Golconda (1954) never saw the light of the day until it was released in YouTube by his younger son Kailash (Monty) Nath on 16 January 2021 in their channel Major Mood Entertainment excluding the songs (which will be in Hindi).

Nath was to play the leading role in Sayyad, a film to be directed by Kamal Amrohi and produced by Madhubala and Ataullah Khan; however, it was ultimately shelved causing major financial loss to the producers. In 1960, Khan cast Nath and Madhubala in his directorial venture, Pathan, but she became sick and was replaced by the newcomer Mumtaz. Starring Nath in the titular role, Pathan was released in 1962 and was a financial failure. The 1963 film Rustom Sohrab marked one of Nath's final films in the leading role.

=== Villain and supporting roles (1970s to 1985) ===
He started receiving recognition with playing the central villain or supporting role in some of the biggest blockbusters in Indian film history throughout the 1970s. Some of his notable films included Teesri Manzil (1966), Johny Mera Naam (1970), Tere Mere Sapne (1971), Shor (1972), Bobby (1973), Roti Kapda Aur Makaan (1974), Dharmatma (1975), Kalicharan (1976), Krodhi (1981) and Desh Premee (1982). He also starred in the religious Punjabi film Sat Sri Akal (1977). He earned Filmfare nominations as Best Supporting Actor for: Shor (1972), Bobby (1973), Amir Garib (1974) and Roti Kapda Aur Makaan (1974).

His last film appearance was in Hum Dono (1985) after which he retired from acting.

=== American productions ===
Apart from Hindi films, he also appeared in an episode of the American television series Maya in 1967 and a 1969 American film titled Kenner opposite former American football player turned actor Jim Brown.

== Other work ==
=== Books ===
He wrote books, including novels, in both English and Hindi.

== Personal life and death ==
Nath dated Madhubala for a brief period in 1951, and they were reported to have contemplated marriage. However, Nath ended the relationship after she became interested in actor Dilip Kumar. Conversely, her sister Madhur Bhushan has attributed the break up to religious differences; Nath wanted Madhubala, a Muslim, to convert to Hinduism for marriage, which her father Ataullah Khan refused. Nevertheless, Nath maintained a lifelong friendship with both Madhubala and her father, and also helped Khan financially after her death.

He fell in love with actress Bina Rai during the filming of Aurat. They married on 2 September 1952 and formed a production company together called P.N. films. Their children are actors Prem Krishen Malhotra (born 5 July 1953) and Kailash Nath (Monty) Malhotra (born 25 May 1958).

They are the grandparents of actress Akanksha Malhotra and director Siddharth P. Malhotra who are Prem Krishen's children. Adiraj Malhotra and Arjun Malhotra are the sons of Kailash Nath. His sister Krishna married Raj Kapoor in 1946 while his other sister Uma was married to veteran Hindi Film actor Prem Chopra in 1969. His brothers Rajendra Nath and Narendra Nath were also actors who mostly appeared in comedic and supporting roles. He was also a close friend of the actress Asha Parekh. He was an ardent admirer of Kundan Lal Saigal and had a desire to sing a duet with Saigal had Saigal lived longer.

Nath was religious and, when his career began to decline in the mid-1950s, he went to the Kailash mountain range in Tibet a spiritual retreat, producing a documentary about his pilgrimage in 1957, Kailash Darshan.

=== Last years and death ===
He died of a heart attack on 3 November 1992 at the age of 65. After his demise, his son Kailash (Monty) Nath made the documentary Amar Prem Nath where his colleagues from the film industry viz. Pran, Ajit, Dilip Kumar, Sunil Dutt, Amrish Puri, Feroz Khan, Dharmendra, Manoj Kumar, Sanjay Khan, Vinod Khanna along with his brother Rajendra Nath, wife Bina Rai and relatives Shammi Kapoor, Shashi Kapoor, Prem Chopra, Randhir Kapoor and Rishi Kapoor spoke about him.

== Partial filmography ==
=== Film ===
Acting filmography
| Year | Title | Role | Notes |
|---|---|---|---|
| 1947 | Daulat Ke Liye | | First on-screen appearance |
| 1948 | Ajit | Ajit | |
| 1948 | Aag | Rajan | |
| 1949 | Barsaat | Gopal | |
| 1950 | Hindustan Hamara | | |
| 1951 | Awaara | Boatswain | Special uncredited appearance in the song "Naiyya Teri Majhdhar" |
| 1951 | Sagai | Captain Prem | |
| 1951 | Naujawan | Raju | |
| 1951 | Shokhiyan | | |
| 1951 | Buzdil | | |
| 1951 | Badal | Badal | |
| 1951 | Aaram | Kumar | |
| 1952 | Aan | Shamsher Singh | |
| 1952 | Saqi | Ajeeb | |
| 1952 | Parbat | Pahari | |
| 1952 | Anjaam | | |
| 1953 | Shagufa | | Also producer |
| 1953 | Mehmaan | | |
| 1953 | Dard-E-Dil | | |
| 1953 | Aurat | Aadil | |
| 1954 | Prisoner of Golconda | Prem Shankar "Kalu" | Also known as Golconda Ka Qaidi. The film was a bilingual production in Hindi and English; Nath also served as producer and director. The English version remained unreleased until it was finally released on 16 January 2021 in YouTube by his son Kailash (Monty) Nath in his channel Major Mood Entertainment excluding the songs (which will be only in Hindi). |
| 1955 | Abe-Hayat | Jalal | |
| 1956 | Hamara Watan | | |
| 1957 | Samundar | (Double Role) | Also producer and director |
| 1957 | Kailash Darshan | | Documentary; also, producer and director |
| 1957 | Changez Khan | Sherwa | |
| 1958 | Son of Sinbad | | |
| 1958 | Chaubees Ghante | | |
| 1959 | Jagir | | |
| 1959 | Forty Days | Shankarlal Saxena | |
| 1959 | Bus conductor | | |
| 1960 | Qatil | | |
| 1960 | Gambler | | |
| 1960 | Dr. Shaitan | | |
| 1960 | Apna Ghar | | |
| 1961 | Sara Jahan Hamara | | |
| 1962 | Pathan | | |
| 1963 | Shaheed Bhagat Singh | Chandra Shekhar Azad | |
| 1963 | Rustom Sohrab | Sohrab | |
| 1964 | Main Jatti Punjab Di | | Punjabi film |
| 1965 | Jaya | | |
| 1965 | Sikandar-e-Azam | Chirag | |
| 1966 | Sher-e-Afghan | | |
| 1966 | Amrapali | Veer | |
| 1966 | Teesri Manzil | Kunwar | |
| 1966 | Pyar Mohabbat | Uday Kumar Singh | |
| 1967 | Mera Bhai Mera Dushman | Prem | |
| 1967 | Baharon Ke Sapne | Mr. Kapoor | |
| 1968 | Kenner | Sandy | American film |
| 1968 | Balram Shri Krishna | Arjun | |
| 1969 | Kamasutra - Vollendung der Liebe | Raj | German film |
| 1969 | Sati Sulochana | Ravanputra Meghnath / Indrajeet | |
| 1969 | Mahua | Rajkumar | |
| 1970 | Ilzam | Ajit | |
| 1970 | Johny Mera Naam | Ranjit Singh / Rai Sahib Bhupendra Singh | |
| 1970 | The Evil Within | Krishna | |
| 1970 | Pushpanjali | Peter D'Costa | |
| 1971 | Tere Mere Sapne | Seth Madhochand | |
| 1972 | Wafaa | Barrister | |
| 1972 | Shor | Khan Badshah | Nominated - Filmfare Award for Best Supporting Actor |
| 1972 | Rani Mera Naam | | |
| 1972 | Raja Jani | Diwan Gajendra Singh | |
| 1972 | Mom Ki Gudiya | Wakil | |
| 1972 | Gora Aur Kala | Prithvi Singh | |
| 1972 | Do Bachche Dus Haath | Captain | |
| 1972 | Be-Imaan | D. I. G. Gopaldas | |
| 1973 | Sherni | | |
| 1973 | Loafer | Pratap | |
| 1973 | Chhupa Rustam | Williams | |
| 1973 | Bobby | Jack Braganza | Nominated - Filmfare Award for Best Supporting Actor |
| 1973 | Nafrat | C. B. I. Inspector Kumar | |
| 1974 | Amir Garib | Daulatram | Nominated - Filmfare Award for Best Supporting Actor |
| 1974 | Roti Kapda Aur Makaan | Harnam Singh | Nominated - Filmfare Award for Best Supporting Actor |
| 1974 | Raja Kaka | Jagmohan | |
| 1974 | Pran Jaye Par Vachan Na Jaye | Mangal Singh | |
| 1974 | Ishk Ishk Ishk | Pahar | |
| 1974 | Chattan Singh | Chattaan Singh / Sher Singh | |
| 1975 | Dharmatma | Dharamdas 'Dharmatma' | |
| 1975 | Dharam Karam | Shankar Dada | |
| 1975 | Sanyasi | Mangal Singh | |
| 1975 | Rani Aur Lalpari | Yamraj | |
| 1975 | Mounto | Boss | |
| 1975 | Dhoti Lota Aur Chowpatty | Imandar Pauwala | |
| 1975 | Dafaa 302 | | |
| 1976 | Zid | | |
| 1976 | Nagin | Sapera | |
| 1976 | Kalicharan | I.G. Khanna | |
| 1976 | Dus Numbri | Inspector Jaichand | |
| 1976 | Jaaneman | Ram Bharose | |
| 1976 | Bajrangbali | Ravan | |
| 1976 | Kabeela | Sardar Babbar | |
| 1976 | Nehle Pe Dehla | General | |
| 1976 | Aap Beati | Bajrang Bahadur | |
| 1977 | Yaaron Ka Yaar | Nathu | |
| 1977 | The Little Gospel of St. Thomas | | Sri Lankan English film |
| 1977 | Jadu Tona | | |
| 1977 | Darinda | Yogiraj | |
| 1977 | Videsh | Swami Prem Baba / Girdharilal Kapoor | |
| 1977 | Thief of Baghdad | Abu Jangar | |
| 1977 | Shirdi Ke Sai Baba | Som Dev | |
| 1977 | Sat Sri Akal (Punjabi) alias Gyaani Ji (Hindi) | | Also, producer, second unit director, singer and co-music director |
| 1977 | Farishta Ya Qatil | | |
| 1977 | Do Chehere | Qawaali Singer / INSP | |
| 1977 | Chandi Sona | Lord Mayor Jojo | |
| 1977 | Chala Murari Hero Banne | Himself | |
| 1978 | Rahu Ketu | Collector Rahu Nath | |
| 1978 | Vishwanath | GNK | |
| 1978 | Shalimar | Raja Bahadur Singh | |
| 1978 | Kaala Aadmi | | |
| 1978 | Heeralaal Pannalaal | Inspector Prem Lal | |
| 1978 | Bhagyalaxmi | | |
| 1979 | Gautam Govinda | Dharam Dutt | |
| 1979 | Muqabla | Police Inspector | |
| 1979 | Magroor | Mamaji | |
| 1979 | Dhongee | John Lord / Gurkha Bahadur | |
| 1979 | Jaani Dushman | Pujari | |
| 1979 | Lok Parlok | Yamraj | |
| 1979 | Ahinsa | | |
| 1980 | Dhan Daulat | Mangat | |
| 1980 | Karz | Sir Judah | |
| 1980 | Suniyasi | | |
| 1981 | Sangdil | | |
| 1981 | Krodhi | Jagira | |
| 1982 | Eent Ka Jawab Patthar | Sevakram | |
| 1982 | Desh Premee | Puthu Anna | |
| 1983 | Farz Ki Keemat | | |
| 1984 | The Gold Medal | Thakur Ranvir Singh | |
| 1985 | Hum Dono | Lata's Father | Final film role |
| 1990s | Amar Prem Nath | Himself | Documentary made by son Kailash (Monty) Nath, featuring veteran Hindi film personalities speaking of Prem Nath alongside featuring his rare footages, photos and clips. |

=== TV series ===
- Maya: (1 episode, 1967)

== Awards and nominations ==
=== Filmfare Awards ===
Nominations

- 1973 – Filmfare Award for Best Supporting Actor for Shor
- 1974 – Filmfare Award for Best Supporting Actor for Bobby
- 1975 – Filmfare Award for Best Supporting Actor for Amir Garib
- 1975 – Filmfare Award for Best Supporting Actor for Roti Kapda Aur Makaan
