= Shankar–Jaikishan discography =

This is a discography of Bollywood composer duo Shankar–Jaikishan, also known as S-J in short, consisting of music directors duo Shankar Singh Ram Singh Raghuvanshi and Jaikishan Dayabhai Panchal.

== Discography ==
Year	Film	Notes
1949	Barsaat	
1951	Awara	
1951	Badal	
1951	Kali Ghata	
1951	Nagina	
1952	Daag	
1952	Parbat	
1952	Poonam	
1953	Premalekhalu	Telugu film
1953	Aah	
1953	Aas	
1953	Aurat	
1953	Naya Ghar	
1953	Patita	
1953	Shikast	
1954	Badshah	
1954	Boot Polish	
1954	Mayurpankh	
1954	Pooja	
1955	Seema	
1955	Shri 420	
1956	Basant Bahar	
1956	Chori Chori	Filmfare Award for Best Music Director
1956	Halaku	
1956	Kismet Ka Khel	
1956	New Delhi	
1956	Patrani	
1956	Rajhath	
1957	Begunaah	
1957	Kathputli	
1958	Baaghi Sipaahi	
1958	Yahudi	Nominated, Filmfare Award for Best Music Director
1959	Anari	Filmfare Award for Best Music Director
1959	Chhoti Bahen	
1959	Kanhaiya	
1959	Love Marriage	
1959	Main Nashe Mein Hoon	
1959	Shararat	
1959	Ujala	
1960	Dil Apna Aur Preet Parai	Filmfare Award for Best Music Director
1960	College Girl	
1960	Ek Phool Char Kaante	
1960	Jis Desh Mein Ganga Behti Hai	Nominated, Filmfare Award for Best Music Director
1960	Singapore	
1961	Aas Ka Panchhi	
1961	Boy Friend	
1961	Jab Pyar Kisi Se Hota Hai	
1961	Junglee	
1961	Krorepati	
1961	Roop Ki Rani Choron Ka Raja	
1961	Sasuraal	
1962	Aashiq	
1962	Asli-Naqli	
1962	Dil Tera Diwana	
1962	Hariyali Aur Rasta	
1962	Professor	Filmfare Award for Best Music Director
1962	Rungoli	
1963	Dil Ek Mandir	Nominated, Filmfare Award for Best Music Director
1963	Ek Dil Sau Afsane	
1963	Hamrahi	
1964	Ayee Milan Ki Bela	
1964	Apne Huye Paraye	
1964	April Fool	
1964	Beti Bete	
1964	Rajkumar	
1964	Sanjh Aur Savera	
1964	Sangam	Nominated, Filmfare Award for Best Music Director
1964	Zindagi	
1965	Aarzoo	Nominated, Filmfare Award for Best Music Director
1965	Gumnaam	
1965	Jaanwar	
1966	Amrapali	
1966	Budtameez	
1966	Gaban	
1966	Love In Tokyo	
1966	Pyar Mohabbat	
1966	Suraj	Filmfare Award for Best Music Director
1966	Teesri Kasam	
1966	Budtameez	
1967	Aman	
1967	An Evening In Paris	
1967	Around The World	
1967	Chhoti Si Mulaqat	
1967	Diwana	Nominated, Filmfare Award for Best Music Director
1967	Gunahon Ka Devta	
1967	Hare Kanch Ki Chooriyan	
1967	Laat Saheb	
1967	Raat Aur Din	
1968	Brahmachari	Filmfare Award for Best Music Director
1968	Duniya	
1968	Jhuk Gaya Aasman	
1968	Kahin Aur Chal	
1968	Kanyadaan	
1968	Mere Huzoor	
1968	Sapno Ka Saudagar	
1968	Shikaar	
1969	Bhai Bahen	
1969	Chanda Aur Bijli	
1969	Jahan Pyar Mile	
1969	Prince	
1969	Pyar Hi Pyar	
1969	Sachaai	
1969	Shatranj	
1969	The Gold Medal	
1969	Tumse Achha Kaun Hai	
1969	Yakeen	
1970	Bhai-Bhai	
1970	Dharti	
1970	Mera Naam Joker	Filmfare Award for Best Music Director
1970	Pagla Kahin Ka	
1970	Pehchaan	Filmfare Award for Best Music Director
1970	Tum Haseen Main Jawan	
1970	Umang	
1971	Albela	
1971	Andaz	Nominated, Filmfare Award for Best Music Director
1971	Balidaan	
1971	Duniya Kya Jaane	
1971	Ek Nari Ek Brahmachari	
1971	Elaan	
1971	Jaane-Anjaane	
1971	Jawan Mohabbat	
1971	Jeevitha Chakram	Telugu Film
1971	Jwala	Delayed release
1971	Kal Aaj Aur Kal	
1971	Lal Patthar	
1971	Main Sunder Hoon	
1971	Nadaan	
1971	Parde Ke Peechey	
1971	Patanga	
1971	Preetam	
1971	Seema	
1972	Aan Baan	
1972	Aankh Micholi	
1972	Aankhon Aankhon Mein	
1972	Bandagi	
1972	Be-Imaan	Filmfare Award for Best Music Director
1972	Dil Daulat Duniya	
1972	Jangal Mein Mangal	
1972	Rivaaj	
1972	Yaar Mera	
1973	Aaj Ki Taaza Khabar	
1973	Daaman Aur Aag	
1973	Door Nahin Manzil	
1973	Naina	
1973	Pyaar Ka Rishta	
1974	Archana	
1974	Chhote Sarkaar	
1974	Insaaniyat	
1974	International Crook	
1974	Resham Ki Dori	Nominated, Filmfare Award for Best Music Director
1974	Tarzan Mera Sathi	An enterprising producer did a mix and match of scenes from the English movie (featuring Feroz Khan and Simi) with newly shot scenes and other Indian actors and included a few songs by Shankar Jaikishan
1974	Vachan	
1975	Do Jhoot	
1975	Neelima	
1975	Saazish	
1975	Sanyasi	Nominated, Filmfare Award for Best Music Director
1977	Dhoop Chhaon	
1977	Duniyadari	
1977	Mera Vachan Geeta Ki Qasam	
1979	Atmaram	
1979	Bombay Talkies	
1980	Garam Khoon	
1981	Mehfil	
1981	Naari	
1982	Chorni	
1982	Eent Ka Jawab Patthar	
1984	Aakhri Sangram	
1984	Papi Pet Ka Sawal Hai	
1986	Inteqam Ki Aag	
1986	Krishna-Krishna	Kanch ki Deewar
1992	Gori	Delayed Release Love in Bombay
