= List of Hindi films of 1967 =

A list of films produced by the Bollywood film industry based in Mumbai in 1967:

== Highest-grossing films ==
The ten highest-grossing films at the Indian box office in 1967:

| Rank | Title | Gross collection |
|---|---|---|
| 1 | Upkar | ₹7 crore |
| 2 | Ram Aur Shyam | ₹5.5 crore |
| 3 | Farz | ₹5 crore |
| 4 | Hamraaz | ₹4.5 crore |
| 5 | Shagird | ₹4 crore |
| 6 | Jewel Thief | ₹3.5 crore |
| 7 | Milan | ₹3.2 crore |
| 8 | An Evening in Paris | ₹3 crore |
| 9 | Patthar Ke Sanam | ₹2.8 crore |
| 10 | Mehrban | ₹2.5 crore |

== Films ==
| Title | Director | Cast | Genre | Notes |
|---|---|---|---|---|
| 6.40 PM | Mani Kaul | | | |
| Aag | Naresh Kumar | Feroz Khan, Mumtaz | Romance | Music: Usha Khanna |
| Aamne Samne | Suraj Prakesh | Shashi Kapoor, Sharmila Tagore, Prem Chopra | Musical | |
| Albela Mastana | B. J. Patel | Kishore Kumar, Bhagwan Dada, Asha Nandkarni, Aruna Irani | Comedy | Music: N. Dutta |
| Aman | Mohan Kumar | Rajendra Kumar, Saira Banu | War/Social | Music: Shankar–Jaikishan |
| An Evening in Paris | Shakti Samanta | Shammi Kapoor, Sharmila Tagore, Pran | Romance, Thriller | Music: Shankar–Jaikishan |
| Anita | Raj Khosla | Manoj Kumar, Sadhana, I. S. Johar | Suspense | Music: Laxmikant-Pyarelal |
| Around the World | Pachhi | Raj Kapoor, Rajshree, Pran | Love story | Music: Shankar–Jaikishan |
| Aurat | S. S. Balan, S. S. Vasan | Pran, Padmini, Feroz Khan, Rajesh Khanna | Drama | Music: Ravi |
| Badrinath Yatra | Dhirubhai Desai | Raj Kumar, Nirupa Roy, Jeevan, | | |
| Baghdad Ki Raatein | Nanabhai Bhaat | Master Baghwan, Mumtaz, Bela Bose | | |
| Baharon Ke Sapne | Nasir Hussain | Nasir Hussain, Asha Parekh, Rajesh Khanna | Drama | Music: R. D. Burman |
| Bahu Begum | M. Sadiq | Pradeep Kumar, Meena Kumari, Ashok Kumar | Drama | Music: Roshan |
| Bhakta Prahlada | Chitrapu Narayana Rao | S. V. Ranga Rao, Anjali Devi | Mythological | |
| Boond Jo Ban Gayee Moti | V. Shantaram | Jeetendra, Mumtaz, Nana Palsikar, Lalita Pawar, Akash Deep, Vaishali | Social Crime Drama | Music: Satish Bhatia; Lyrics: Bharat Vyas |
| C.I.D. 909 | Mohammed Hussain | Mumtaz, Feroz Khan | action | O. P. Nayyar |
| Chand Par Chadayee | T. P. Sundaram | Dara Singh, Anwar Hussain, Padma Khanna | Science Fiction | |
| Chandan Ka Palna | Ismail Memon | Dharmendra, Meena Kumari | Drama | |
| Chhaila Babu | Kalpataru | Bhagwan, Salim Khan, Kumari Naaz, Rajendra Nath | | |
| Chhoti Si Mulaqat | Alo Sarkar | Vyjayanthimala, Uttam Kumar | Romance, Drama | |
| Dharti Ki Pukar | Khwaja Ahmad Abbas | | | |
| Dil Ne Pukara | Mohan | Shashi Kapoor, Sanjay Khan, Rajhsree, Mehmood | | |
| Dilruba | Mohammed Hussain | Shyam Kumar, Kum Kum, Helen, Madhumati, Ajit | | |
| Diwana | Mahesh Kaul | Raj Kapoor, Saira Banu | Drama | |
| Do Dushman | Mohammad Hussain | Dara Singh, Mumtaz | | |
| Dulhan Ek Raat Ki | D. D. Kashyap | Dharmendra, Nutan, Rehman | Drama | |
| Duniya Nachegi | Kalpataru | Kishore Kumar, Kum Kum, Bhagvan, Aruna Irani | | |
| Farz | Ravikant Nagaich | Jeetendra, Babita | Spy Thriller | |
| Gautama the Buddha | Bimal Roy | | | |
| Ghar Ka Chiraag | Jagdev Bhambri | Dharmendra, Biswajeet, Waheeda Rehman | Social Drama | |
| Gunahon Ka Devta | Devi Sharma | Rajshree Shantaram, Jeetendra, Leela Chitnis | Drama | |
| Gunehgar | R. Thakur | Sanjeev Kumar, Kum Kum, Madan Puri, Mehmood Jr | Action Crime | |
| Hamare Gam Se Mat Khelo | Pal Premi | Barathi Devi, Nasir Hussain, Raza Murad | Family | |
| Hamraaz | B.R. Chopra | Sunil Dutt, Raaj Kumar, Vimi | Musical/Suspense | |
| Hare Kanch Ki Chooriyan | Kishore Sahu | Biswajit Chatterjee, Nazir Hussain, Helen | Social Drama | |
| Hatey Bazarey | Tapan Sinha | Ashok Kumar, Vyjayanthimala | Arthouse | |
| Hum Do Daku | Kishore Kumar | Kishore Kumar, Anoop Kumar, Ganga | Comedy | |
| Jaal | Moni Bhattacharjee | Mala Sinha, Biswajit Chatterjee | Suspense Thriller | |
| Jab Yaad Kisi Ki Aati Hai | Naresh Saigal | Dharmendra, Mala Sinha | | |
| Jewel Thief | Vijay Anand | Dev Anand, Vyjayanthimala, Tanuja | | |
| Johar in Bombay | Shantilal Soni | I. S. Johar, Sonia Sahni, Rajendranath | Drama. Comedy | |
| Lamboo in Hong Kong | Harsukh Jagneshwar Bhaat | Mehmood, Sujit Kumar, Helen | Action. Comedy | |
| Latt Saheb | Hari Walia | Shammi Kapoor, Nutan, Prem Chopra | | |
| Lav-Kush | | | | |
| Majhli Didi | Hrishikesh Mukherjee | Dharmendra, Meena Kumari | Drama | |
| Maya Sundari | | | | |
| Mehrban | A. Bhimsingh | Nutan, Sunil Dutt, Ashok Kumar | Drama | |
| Mera Bhai Mera Dushman | Mohammed Hussain | Jagdish Kumar, Shyama, Premnath, Laxmi Chahya | Drama | |
| Mera Munna | Madusudhan | Nutan, Rehman, Sudir, Asit Sen. | Drama Family | |
| Milan | Adurthi Subba Rao | Sunil Dutt, Nutan, Om Prakash, Pran | Drama | |
| Milan Ki Raat | R. Bhattarcharya | Sanjay khan, Sharmila Tagore, Chan Usmani | Drama Romance | |
| Nai Roshni | C. V. Sridhar | Mala Sinha, Biswajit Chatterjee, Ashok Kumar, Tanuja | Drama | |
| Naunihaal | Raj Marbros | Sanjeev Kumar, Balraj Sahni, Indrani Mukherjee | Drama | |
| Nawab Siraz-ud-Daula | Khan Ataur Rahman | Anwar Hussain, Anis | Drama History | |
| Naya Raasta | Nabyendu Chatterji | Ashak Parekh, Allauddin | Drama | |
| Night in London | Brij Sadanah | Mala Sinha, Biswajit Chatterjee | Crime Drama | |
| Noor Jehan | Sheikh Mukhtar | Pradeep Kumar Meena Kumari, Helen | Historical | |
| Palki | Mahesh Kaul, S. U. Sunny | Waheeda Rehman, Rajendra Kumar | | |
| Parivar | Kewal P. Kashrap | Jeetendra, Nanda | Drama | |
| Patthar Ke Sanam | Raja Nawathe | Manoj Kumar, Waheeda Rehman, Mumtaz, Pran | Drama | |
| Raat Aur Din | Satyen Bose | Nargis Dutt, Pradeep Kumar | Psychological | |
| Raaz | Ravindra Dave | Rajesh Khanna, Babita | Romance, Thriller | |
| Ram Aur Shyam | Tapi Chanakya | Dilip Kumar, Waheeda Rehman, Mumtaz, Pran | Comedy, Drama | |
| Ram Rajya | Vijay Bhatt | Bina Rai, Kumar Sen, Badri Prasad, Kanhaiyalal, Farida Jalal, Anil Kumar, Jay Vijay | Religious | Music: Vasant Desai; Lyrics: Bharat Vyas |
| Sardar | Babubhai Mistry | Dara Singh, Nishi Kholi, Helen | Drama. History | |
| Shagird | Samir Ganguly | Joy Mukherjee, Saira Bano | Comedy | |
| Shamsher | Babubhai Mistry | Prithviraj Kapoor, Aruna Irani, Laxmi Chahya, Helen, Jeevan | | |
| Taqdeer | A. Salaam | Bharat Bhushan, Shalini, Faridah Jalal, Johnny Walker | Drama. Family | |
| Upkar | Manoj Kumar | Manoj Kumar, Asha Parekh, Prem Chopra, Pran, Madan Puri, Kanhaiya Lal | Social | |
| Wahan Ke Log | N. A. Ansari | Tanuja, Pradeep Kumar, Bela Bose, Laxmi Chahya | Science Fiction | |
| Woh Koi Aur Hoga | A. Shamhseer | Feroz Khan, Mumtaz, Asit Sen | Action Drama Mystery | |
