= Hasrat Jaipuri =

Indian poet and lyricist (1922–1999)

- Born: Iqbal Hussain; 15 April 1922; Jaipur, Jaipur State, British India
- Died: 17 September 1999 (aged 77); Mumbai, Maharashtra, India
- Occupation: Film song lyricist
- Years active: 1949 – 1999
- Spouse: Bilquis Zamaani (m. 1953)
- Children: 3
- Relatives: Sardar Malik (brother-in-law); Anu Malik (nephew); Daboo Malik (nephew)
- Awards: Filmfare Best Lyricist Award in 1967 and 1972

Hasrat Jaipuri (born Iqbal Hussain; 15 April 1922 – 17 September 1999), was an Indian poet, who wrote in the Hindi and Urdu languages. He was also a renowned film lyricist in Hindi films, where he won the Filmfare Awards for Best Lyricist twice – in 1966 and 1972.

== Early life ==
Jaipuri was born Iqbal Husain in Jaipur, where he studied in English till medium level, and then acquired his taalim (education) in Urdu and Persian from his maternal grandfather, the poet Fida Husain 'Fida'. He began writing verse at about twenty years of age. Around the same time, he fell in love with a girl in his neighborhood named Radha. Hasrat spoke about a love letter he wrote to this girl, in an interview later in life, that love knows no religion. Hasrat Jaipuri was quoted as saying, "It is not at all necessary that a Muslim boy must fall in love only with a Muslim girl. My love was silent, but I wrote a poem for her, 'Yeh mera prem patra padh kar, ke tum naaraaz na hona." It is uncertain whether the love letter was actually delivered to Radha. But the veteran film producer Raj Kapoor liked it enough to include it in his Sangam (1964 Hindi film) and the song ended up becoming a 'hit' song in India.

== Career in Bollywood ==
In 1940, Jaipuri came to Bombay (now Mumbai), and started working as a bus conductor, earning a monthly salary of eleven rupees. He used to participate in mushairas, or poetry recitation symposiums. At a mushaira, Prithviraj Kapoor noticed Jaipuri and recommended him to his son, Raj Kapoor. Raj Kapoor was planning a musical love story, Barsaat (1949) with Shankar–Jaikishan. Jaipuri wrote his first recorded song, Jiya Beqaraar Hai for the film. His second song (and first duet) was Chhor Gaye Baalam.

Along with Shailendra, Jaipuri wrote lyrics for all Raj Kapoor films till 1971. After the death of Jaikishan and failures of Mera Naam Joker (1970) and Kal Aaj Aur Kal (1971), however, Raj Kapoor turned to other lyricists and music directors. Raj Kapoor initially wanted to call him back for Prem Rog (1982), but later settled for another lyricist, Amir Qazalbash. Kapoor finally asked him to write lyrics for the film, Ram Teri Ganga Maili (1985). Later, he also invited Hasrat to write three songs for the movie Henna (1991). Jaipuri alleges that after Raj Kapoor's death, the music composer Ravindra Jain "conspired" to "scrap" his lyrics and replace them with his own lyrics.

When fellow lyricist Shailendra turned producer with Teesri Kasam, he invited Jaipuri to write lyrics for the movie. He also wrote screenplay for the movie Hulchul (1951). His last film as a lyricist was Hatya: The Murder (2004).

== Poetry ==
Jaipuri wrote several books of poetry, in Hindi and Urdu. He once said, "Hindi and Urdu are like two great and inseparable sisters."

- Abshaar-E-Ghazal (compilation of Hasrat Jaipuri's poetry)

== Personal life ==
Jaipuri invested his earnings in real estate or rental property, on his wife's advice. Thanks to earnings from these properties, his financial condition was sound, and therefore he could devote his time as a lyricist. He was survived by two sons and a daughter who live in Mumbai. His sister Bilqis Malik was married to music director Sardar Malik and is the mother of composer Anu Malik. Bilquis Zamaani passed away on 23 August 2009.

He has two sons and a daughter, Akhtar Hasrat Jaipuri, Asif Hasrat Jaipuri and Kishwar Jaipuri. Aadil, Amaan, Aamir and Faiz Jaipuri are his grandsons.

== Filmography ==
=== Screenwriter ===
Year	Film	Notes
1951	Hulchul	Only film as a screenwriter. Did not pen lyrics.

=== Lyricist ===
Year	Film	Songs written	Music Director(s)	Notes
1949	Barsaat	7	Shankar-Jaikishan	Debut film
1950	Wafa	4	Bulo C. Rani and Vinod (separately)	
1951	Awara	4	Shankar-Jaikishan	
1951	Badal	3	Shankar-Jaikishan	
1951	Bade Sahab	8 (All)	Nisar Bazmi	
1951	Imaan	4	Moti Ram	
1951	Kali Ghata	5	Shankar-Jaikishan	
1951	Lachak	1	Moti Ram	
1951	Nagina	3	Shankar-Jaikishan	
1951	Saiyan	1	Sajjad Hussain	
1951	Saudaagar	2	Hanuman Prasad	
1952	Anand Math	1	Hemant Kumar	
1952	Anndata	5	Mohammed Shafi Nagri Niyazi	
1952	Badnam	3	Basant Prakash	
1952	Daag	3	Shankar-Jaikishan	
1952	Hamari Duniya	3	Shyam Babu Pathak	
1952	Neelam Pari	7	Khwaja Khurshid Anwar	
1952	Nishan Danka	3	Basant Prakash	
1952	Parbat	4	Shankar-Jaikishan	
1952	Poonam	5	Shankar-Jaikishan	
1952	Saloni	1	Basant Prakash	The film was originally titled Chanchal.
1952	Shrimatiji	1	James Singh (Jimmy)	
1953	Aag Ka Darya	1	Vinod	
1953	Aah	6	Shankar-Jaikishan	
1953	Aas	2	Shankar-Jaikishan	
1953	Anarkali	2	Ramchandra Narhar Chitalkar	
1953	Aurat	6	Shankar-Jaikishan	
1953	Dard-E-Dil	3	Rai Chand Boral	
1953	Khoj	2	Nisar Bazmi	
1953	Mayurpankh	3	Shankar-Jaikishan	This was a rare Hindi film in which one singer sang all the songs. It featured five Lata Mangeshkar solos and one duet of hers with Asha Bhosle.
1953	Naya Ghar	3	Shankar-Jaikishan	
1953	Naya Rasta	1	Chitragupta Srivastava	
1953	Papi	2	Mohinder Singh Sarna	
1953	Patita	1	Shankar-Jaikishan	
1953	Shikast	At most 4	Shankar-Jaikishan	
1954	Badshah	6	Shankar-Jaikishan	
1954	Boot Polish	2	Shankar-Jaikishan	
1954	Hamlet	5 (All)	Ramesh Naidu	
1954	Pilpli Saheb	6	Sardul Singh Kwatra	
1954	Pooja	2	Shankar-Jaikishan	
1954	Sangam	2	Ram Ganguly	
1955	Abe-Hayat	5	Sardar Malik	This was the first film in which music director Sardar Malik collaborated with lyricist Hasrat Jaipuri. Malik went on to marry Hasrat's sister Bilqis and worked with his brother-in-law in a handful of other films. Sardar Malik and Bilqis's sons Anu Malik and Daboo Malik became Hindi film music directors.
1955	Aaj Ki Baat	2	Snehal Bhatkar	
1955	Jhanak Jhanak Payal Baaje	7	Vasant Desai	
1955	Seema	4	Shankar-Jaikishan	
1955	Shahi Mehman	1	Bipin-Babul	
1955	Shree 420	2	Shankar-Jaikishan	
1956	Basant Bahar	1	Shankar-Jaikishan	
1956	Chori Chori	5	Shankar-Jaikishan	
1956	Delhi Darbar	4	Shri Nath Tripathi	
1956	Halaku	3	Shankar-Jaikishan	
1956	Insaaf	2	Chitragupta Srivastava	
1956	Kismet Ka Khel	2	Shankar-Jaikishan	
1956	Naqab Posh	2	Ram Lal Chaudhury	
1956	New Delhi	2	Shankar-Jaikishan	
1956	Patrani	1	Shankar-Jaikishan	
1956	Raj Hath	4	Shankar-Jaikishan	
1956	Sailaab	2	Mukul Roy	It appears that the film was a long time in the making. While it was certified in 1956, the records for most of its songs were issued in 1954.
1956	Toofan Aur Deeya	1	Vasant Desai	
1957	Ab Dilli Dur Nahin	4	Dattaram Wadkar	
1957	Begunah	3	Shankar-Jaikishan	
1957	Coffee House	1	Roshan Lal Nagrath	
1957	Johnny Walker	6 (All)	Omkar Prasad Nayyar	
1957	Kathputli	2	Shankar-Jaikishan	
1957	Maharani	3	Basant Prakash	It is not known if music records were issued for this film. The information regarding the film's songs and related credits was obtained by Har Mandir Singh 'Hamraaz' from music director Basant Prakash.
1957	Mohini	2	Dattaram Baburao Naik	
1957	Mr. X	3	Dattaram Baburao Naik	
1957	Mumtaz Mahal	4	Vinod	
1957	Neelofer	3	Basant Prakash	
1958	Baghi Sipahi	3	Shankar-Jaikishan	It appears that the film was a long time in the making. Some of its music records were issued in 1955 but the film was certified only in 1958.
1958	Do Phool	9 (All)	Vasant Desai	
1958	Howrah Bridge	2	Omkar Prasad Nayyar	
1958	Kabhi Andhera Kabhi Ujala	4	Omkar Prasad Nayyar	
1958	Mr. Qartoon M. A.	7 (All)	Omkar Prasad Nayyar	The song "Main Hoon Qartoon..." was a long song with five antaras. Because of its length, it was split into two parts in its 78 rpm records - Part 1 featured the first two antaras and Part 2 had the remaining three antaras. The first four antaras of the song were used in the main song sequence of the film and the last antara was used in the climax. While most of the song was a duet sung by Mohammed Rafi and Asha Bhosle, the fourth antara was sung by Mohammed Rafi and Shamshad Begum.
1958	Parvarish	7 (All)	Dattaram Wadkar	
1958	Pehla Pehla Pyar	4	Baldev Nath Bali	
1958	Piya Milan	6	Ramesh Naidu	
1958	Samrat Chandragupt	At most 1	Kalyanji Veerji Shah	This was the only Hindi film in which actress Nirupa Roy had lyric writing credits. She was listed as one of the lyricists in the opening credits. While the Hindi Film Geet Kosh credits the lyrics for "Mujhe Dekh Chand Sharmaye..." to Nirupa Roy, the music records paint a confusing picture. While some versions of the music records credited Nirupa Roy as the lyricist for "Haath Se Mere Lele Jaam...", other versions credited Hasrat Jaipuri. The song was sung by Lata Mangeshkar.
1958	Sim Sim Margina	At least 1	Allah Rakha Qureshi	He was credited as the co-lyricist of the song "Kisi Dil Se Sunoge Meri Ulfat Ki Kahani..." written alongside Asad Bhopali. The film had separate music by Hansraj Behl and Allah Rakha Qureshi. This song had music by Qureshi.
1958	Yahudi	1	Shankar-Jaikishan	
1959	Anari	2	Shankar-Jaikishan	
1959	Chhoti Bahen	3	Shankar-Jaikishan	
1959	C. I. D. Girl		Roshan Lal Nagrath	
1959	Kanhaiya	2	Shankar-Jaikishan	
1959	Love Marriage	3	Shankar-Jaikishan	
1959	Main Nashe Men Hoon	4	Shankar-Jaikishan	
1959	O Tera Kya Kehna	2	Kalyanji Veerji Shah	
1959	Qaidi No. 911	6 (All)	Dattaram Wadkar	
1959	Santan	8 (All)	Dattaram Wadkar	
1959	Satta Bazaar	At least 2	Kalyanji-Anandji	
1959	Shararat	4	Shankar-Jaikishan	
1959	Ujala	3	Shankar-Jaikishan	
1960	Bambai Ki Billi alias Wild Cat	7 (All)	Mohammed Zahur Khayyam Hashmi	
1960	Barood	7 (All)	Mohammed Zahur Khayyam Hashmi	
1960	Dil Apna Aur Preet Parai	2	Shankar-Jaikishan	
1960	Ek Phool Char Kante	3	Shankar-Jaikishan	
1960	Jis Desh Mein Ganga Behti Hai	1	Shankar-Jaikishan	
1960	Kala Aadmi	4	Dattaram Wadkar	
1960	Kalpana	1	Omkar Prasad Nayyar	
1960	Mera Ghar Mere Bachchay	9 (All)	Sardar Malik	
1960	Shriman Satyawadi	2	Dattaram Wadkar	
1960	Singapore	4	Shankar-Jaikishan	
1961	Aas Ka Panchhi	3	Shankar-Jaikishan	
1961	Apsara	1	Husnlal-Bhagatram	
1961	Boy Friend	5	Shankar-Jaikishan	
1961	Jab Pyar Kisi Se Hota Hai	7	Shankar-Jaikishan	
1961	Jadoo Nagri	6 (All)	Shri Nath Tripathi	
1961	Junglee	5	Shankar-Jaikishan	
1961	Krorepati	3	Shankar-Jaikishan	
1961	Madan Manjari	8 (All)	Sardar Malik	
1961	Oomar Qaid	7 (All)	Iqbal Qureshi	
1961	Roop Ki Rani Choron Ka Raja	2	Shankar-Jaikishan	
1961	Sasural	3	Shankar-Jaikishan	
1962	Aashiq	2	Shankar-Jaikishan	
1962	Asli Naqli	5	Shankar-Jaikishan	
1962	Dil Tera Deewana	3	Shankar-Jaikishan	
1962	Hariyali Aur Rasta	3	Shankar-Jaikishan	
1962	Professor	4	Shankar-Jaikishan	
1962	Rungoli	3	Shankar-Jaikishan	
1963	Bachpan	6 (All)	Sardar Malik	
1963	Dil Ek Mandir	3	Shankar-Jaikishan	
1963	Ek Dil Sao Afsane	3	Shankar-Jaikishan	
1963	Hamrahi	5	Shankar-Jaikishan	
1963	Sehra	8 (All)	Ram Lal Chaudhury	
1963	Tere Ghar Ke Samne	8 (All)	Sachin Dev Burman	
1964	Apne Huye Paraye	2	Shankar-Jaikishan	
1964	April Fool	6	Shankar-Jaikishan	
1964	Ayee Milan Ki Bela	5	Shankar-Jaikishan	
1964	Baghi	6 (All)	Chitragupta Srivastava	
1964	Beti Bete	4	Shankar-Jaikishan	
1964	Geet Gaaya Pattharon Ne	8	Ram Lal Chaudhury	
1964	Jantar Mantar	6 (All)	Sardar Malik	
1964	Ji Chahta Hai	7 (All)	Kalyanji-Anandji	
1964	Phoolon Ki Sej	9 (All)	Adi Narayana Rao	
1964	Rajkumar	3	Shankar-Jaikishan	
1964	Sangam	3	Shankar-Jaikishan	
1964	Sanjh Aur Savera	4	Shankar-Jaikishan	
1964	Suhagan	6 (All)	Madan Mohan Kohli	
1964	Ziddi	8 (All)	Sachin Dev Burman	
1964	Zindagi	7	Shankar-Jaikishan	
1965	Arzoo	7 (All)	Shankar-Jaikishan	
1965	Bhoot Bungla	6 (All)	Rahul Dev Burman	
1965	Gumnaam	5	Shankar-Jaikishan	
1965	Janwar	3	Shankar-Jaikishan	
1965	Naya Kanoon	7	Madan Mohan Kohli	
1965	Rishte Naate	4 (All)	Madan Mohan Kohli	All the songs in this film were rendered by one singer - Lata Mangeshkar.
1965	Sher Dil	6 (All)	Ramchandra Narhar Chitalkar	
1966	Ajnabi	3	Datta P. Korgaonkar and Dwarkesh (separately)	
1966	Amrapali	1	Shankar-Jaikishan	
1966	Budtameez	5	Shankar-Jaikishan	
1966	Gaban	4	Shankar-Jaikishan	
1966	Love In Tokyo	7	Shankar-Jaikishan	
1966	Pyar Mohabbat	4	Shankar-Jaikishan	
1966	Sher Afghan	6 (All)	Shankar-Jaikishan	
1966	Street Singer	7 (All)	Shankar-Jaikishan	This film credited its music to Suraj, who was listed as "An assistant of Shankar Jaikishan" in the film's opening credits and publicity material. It is widely acknowledged that Suraj was a pseudonym for Shankar himself.
1966	Suraj	5	Shankar-Jaikishan	
1966	Teesri Kasam	3	Shankar-Jaikishan	
1967	Aman	5	Shankar-Jaikishan	
1967	An Evening In Paris alias Paris Ki Ek Shaam	4	Shankar-Jaikishan	
1967	Around The World	4	Shankar-Jaikishan	
1967	Chhaila Babu	2	Laxmikant-Pyarelal	
1967	Chhoti Si Mulaqat	4	Shankar-Jaikishan	
1967	Diwana	4	Shankar-Jaikishan	
1967	Gunahon Ka Devta	6	Shankar-Jaikishan	
1967	Hare Kanch Ki Chooriyan	3	Shankar-Jaikishan	
1967	Latt Saheb	4	Shankar-Jaikishan	
1967	Raat Aur Din	3	Shankar-Jaikishan	
1968	Brahmachari	3	Shankar-Jaikishan	
1968	Duniya	4	Shankar-Jaikishan	
1968	Humsaya	2	Omkar Prasad Nayyar	
1968	Jhuk Gaya Aasman	4	Shankar-Jaikishan	
1968	Jung Aur Aman	2	Gurusharan Singh Kohli	
1968	Kahin Aur Chal	3	Shankar-Jaikishan	
1968	Kanyadaan	3	Shankar-Jaikishan	
1968	Mere Huzoor	7 (All)	Shankar-Jaikishan	
1968	Sapno Ka Saudagar	2	Shankar-Jaikishan	
1968	Shikar	6 (All)	Shankar-Jaikishan	
1969	Bhai Bahen	2	Shankar-Jaikishan	
1969	Chanda Aur Bijli	2	Shankar-Jaikishan	
1969	Jahan Pyar Miley	3	Shankar-Jaikishan	
1969	Jiyo Aur Jeene Do	4	Jaidev Verma	
1969	Prince	3	Shankar-Jaikishan	
1969	Pyar Hi Pyar	5	Shankar-Jaikishan	
1969	Road To Sikkim	4	Vijay Singh	
1969	Shatranj	4	Shankar-Jaikishan	
1969	Tumse Achha Kaun Hai	4	Shankar-Jaikishan	
1969	Yakeen	5 (All)	Shankar-Jaikishan	
1970	Bhai Bhai	5	Shankar-Jaikishan	
1970	Bombay Talkie	3	Shankar-Jaikishan	
1970	Dharti	2	Shankar-Jaikishan	
1970	Geet	3	Kalyanji-Anandji	
1970	Ghar Ghar Ki Kahani	2	Kalyanji-Anandji	
1970	Mahraja	1	Madan Mohan Kohli	
1970	Mera Naam Joker	3	Shankar-Jaikishan	This film was a long time in the making.
1970	Moojrim	3	Sonik-Omi	
1970	Pagla Kahin Ka	5	Shankar-Jaikishan	
1970	Pehchan	1	Shankar-Jaikishan	
1970	Rootha Na Karo	7 (All)	Ramchandra Narhar Chitalkar	
1970	Tum Haseen Main Jawan	3	Shankar-Jaikishan	
1970	Umang	3	Shankar-Jaikishan	
1971	Albela	5 (All)	Shankar-Jaikishan	
1971	Andaz	6 (All)	Shankar-Jaikishan	
1971	Dharti Ki God Mein	6 (All)	Sonik-Omi	
1971	Ek Nari Ek Brahmachari	2	Shankar-Jaikishan	
1971	Elaan	1	Shankar-Jaikishan	
1971	Jane Anjane	4	Shankar-Jaikishan	This film was first launched after the release of Shakti Samanta and Shammi Kapoor's previous film An Evening In Paris (1967). It was then postponed because Shammi Kapoor was very busy at the time. Another reason for the postponement was Shammi Kapoor's weight gain - Samanta asked the actor to lose some weight before starting work on this film. This was their last film together, ending an association that went back to the film Singapore (1960). Hasrat Jaipuri had written lyrics for both An Evening In Paris and Singapore.
1971	Jawan Muhabat	6	Shankar-Jaikishan	
1971	Kal Aaj Aur Kal	2	Shankar-Jaikishan	
1971	Lal Patthar	2	Shankar-Jaikishan	
1971	Murder In Circus	5 (All)	Usha Khanna	
1971	Nadaan	6 (All)	Shankar-Jaikishan	
1971	Patanga	2	Shankar-Jaikishan	This film was certified and released in 1971 but its audio records were first issued in 1970.
1971	Preetam	1	Shankar-Jaikishan	
1971	Rakhwala	1	Kalyanji-Anandji	
1972	Aan Baan	3	Shankar-Jaikishan	
1972	Aankhon Aankhon Mein	1	Shankar-Jaikishan	
1972	Apradh	1	Kalyanji-Anandji	
1972	Dil Daulat Duniya	At most 2	Shankar-Jaikishan	He was jointly credited alongside Neeraj as the lyricist of the songs "Ruk Meri Rani, Nazar Aana Jani..." sung by Kishore Kumar and "O Meri Lara Loo..." sung by Kishore Kumar and Asha Bhosle.
1972	Ek Khilari Bawan Pattey	5 (All)	Sonik-Omi	
1972	Jangal Mein Mangal	At least 1	Shankar-Jaikishan	
1972	Lalkar	2	Kalyanji-Anandji	
1972	Munimji	At least 1	Usha Khanna	
1972	Rut Rangeeli Ayee	2	Ratandeep-Hemraj	
1972	Rivaaj	2	Shankar-Jaikishan	
1972	Shararat	6	Ganesh Sharma	The audio records of this film were issued in 1971 but the film was released in 1972.
1972	Yaar Mera	2	Shankar-Jaikishan	
1973	Aaj Ki Taaza Khabar	5 (All)	Shankar-Jaikishan	
1973	Alam Ara	4	Iqbal Qureshi	
1973	Archana	4	Shankar-Jaikishan	
1973	Chalaak	5 (All)	Ganesh Sharma	
1973	Daaman Aur Aag	5 (All)	Shankar-Jaikishan	
1973	Khoon Khoon	2	Vijay Singh	
1973	Mera Vachan Geeta Ki Qasam	5	Shankar-Jaikishan	The audio records of this film were issued in 1973, and it was certified in 1974, but the film was released only in 1977. The spelling of a word in the film's title was changed in the period - 'Gita' in the audio release was spelt as 'Geeta' in the film's theatrical release. This was a rare film album in which all songs were solos sung by one singer - Asha Bhosle.
1973	Naina	5	Shankar-Jaikishan	
1973	Rani Aur Jaani	At least 2	Satyam	It appears that this film was initially titled Do Dil Do Raaste. Audio records were also issued with this title before the film's title was changed.
1973	Sabak	3	Usha Khanna	
1973	Shikwah	3 (All)	Chitragupta Srivastava	
1973	Wohi Raat Wohi Awaaz	4 (All)	Sonik-Omi	The audio records of this film were issued in 1972, but the film was released in 1973. There was a minor difference in the spelling of one of the words in the film's title's between the audio records - Awaz - and the film release - Awaaz.
1974	Apradhi		Usha Khanna	
1974	Hamrahi	1	Kalyanji-Anandji	
1974	Insaaniyat	2	Shankar-Jaikishan	
1974	My Friend	4 (All)	Naushad Ali	The audio records of this film were issued in 1973 but the film was released in 1974.
1974	Resham Ki Dori	1	Shankar-Jaikishan	
1974	Sapne Suhane	3 (All)	Shyamji-Ghanshyamji	
1974	Vachan	4	Shankar-Jaikishan	
1975	Aakhri Daao	4 (All)	Laxmikant-Pyarelal	
1975	Daaku	1	Shyamji-Ghanshyamji	
1975	Dhoti Lota Aur Chowpatty	3	Shyamji-Ghanshyamji	
1975	Do Jasoos	At least 1	Ravindra Jain	
1975	Saazish	5 (All)	Shankar-Jaikishan	
1975	Salaakhen	2	Ravindra Jain	
1975	Sanyasi	1	Shankar-Jaikishan	
1976	Deewaangee	1	Ravindra Jain	
1976	Ladki Bholi Bhali	3	Usha Khanna	
1977	Kotwal Saab	1	Ravindra Jain	
1977	Mandir Masjid	1	Sharda Rajan Iyengar	
1977	Niaz Aur Namaz	1	Shyamji-Ghanshyamji	The word Namaaz in the title of the audio release was spelt as Namaz in the theatrical release.
1977	Ram Bharose	At most 3	Ravindra Jain	
1978	Atyachar	1	Ravindra Jain	This film was certified again in 1983 with some changes and released in 1987 with the new title Gulami Ki Zanzeeren. There was no change in the film's score.
1978	College Girl	1	Bappi Lahiri	
1978	Haiwan	1	Bappi Lahiri	It appears that the film was a long time in the making. Its music records were issued in 1976 and the film was certified on 13 June 1978.
1978	Hamaara Sansaar	1	Ravindra Jain	He was credited alongside Ravindra Jain as the lyricist of the song, "Zulfen Jo Moonh Mein Daalo Toh Din Mein Shaam Kar Do..." sung by Manna Dey and Asha Bhosle.
1978	Hunterwali 77	4 (All)	Anu Malik	The film was launched with Sardar Malik as the music director. When he fell ill during its making, producer Mohan Choti asked his teenage son Anu Malik to complete the songs, thus making his debut in films as a music director. The songs were written by his uncle, Hasrat Jaipuri.
1978	Khoon Ki Pukaar	2	Bappi Lahiri	
1979	Gawaah	2	Jaikumar Paarte	
1979	Sarkari Mehman	1	Ravindra Jain	All the songs in this film were rendered by one singer - Asha Bhosle.
1980	Garam Khoon	1	Shankar-Jaikishan	The film was a long time in the making. Its audio records were issued in 1979 and the film was released in 1980.
1980	Tu Meri Main Tera	1	Sharda Rajan Iyengar	It looks like this film was a long time in the making.
1980	Zakhmon Ke Nishan	2	Ravindra Jain	It appears that the audio records of this film were issued in 1979 and it was certified the same year but it was released in 1980.
1981	Aapas Ki Baat	1	Anu Malik	
1981	Kahani Ek Chor Ki	3	Ravindra Jain	
1981	Maila Aanchal	1	Sharda Rajan Iyengar	
1981	Poonam	3	Anu Malik	
1982	Aagaman	1	Ghulam Mustafa Khan	
1982	Chorni	1	Shankar-Jaikishan	
1983	Farz Ki Keemat	4 (All)	Sonik-Omi	
1983	Film Hi Film	2	Shankar-Jaikishan	Documentary film where 2 recorded and shot songs of the shelved film Sajan Ki Galiyan (1966) were used and shown here.
1983	Mangal Pandey	2	Anu Malik	This film was in the making for many years.
1983	Nigahain	2	Sardar Malik	
1984	Dhokebaaz	1	Ravindra Jain	
1984	Love Marriage	5 (All)	Anu Malik	
1984	Papi Pet Ka Sawal Hai	1	Shankar-Jaikishan	
1984	The Gold Medal	2	Shankar-Jaikishan	This film was plagued by problems and delayed by many years. It appears that the film was launched in the late 1960s or early 1970s, its audio records were issued in 1975, the film was certified in 1979, and it was released in 1984.
1985	Cheekh	2	Nadeem-Shravan	
1985	Hum Se Mile Tum	2	Narayan Dutt	
1985	Itni Jaldi Kya Hai	1	Vijay	
1985	Padosi Ki Biwi	4 (All)	Usha Khanna	
1985	Ram Teri Ganga Maili	1	Ravindra Jain	
1986	Karamdaata	5 (All)	Anu Malik	
1986	Qatil Aur Aashiq	At least 1	Nadeem-Shravan	
1987	Dadagiri	7 (All)	Anu Malik	
1987	Gulami Ki Zanzeeren	1	Ravindra Jain	Revised, re-certified and re-released version of the film Atyachar. There was no change in the film's score.
1987	Jhuke Jhuke Naina	2	Anup Jalota	
1988	Som Mangal Shani	At least 1	Anu Malik	
1989	Dana Paani	7 (All)	Anu Malik	
1989	Hisaab Khoon Ka	2	Nadeem-Shravan	
1989	Ladaai	1	Anu Malik	
1989	Parchhaeen	1	Ravindra Jain	It appears that the audio records of this 1989 film were first released in 1977. Ravindra Jain's solo song in the film seems to have been added later.
1990	Amavas Ki Raat	3 (All)	Usha Khanna	
1990	Apmaan Ki Aag	1	Nadeem-Shravan	
1990	Din Dahade	3	Jeetu-Tapan	
1990	Mamta Ki Chhaon Mein	2	Kishore Kumar	This was Kishore Kumar's last film as a music director and producer. While the film was conceived in 1983, its audio records were issued in 1988 and it was released in 1990. The film was plagued by many delays due to financial issues. After Kishore Kumar's death in 1987, his son Amit Kumar took the film to completion. The film began with a montage of Kishore Kumar's photographs and songs.
1990	Qayamat Ki Raat	3	Laxmikant-Pyarelal	
1990	Tejaa	2	Anu Malik	
1991	Bhabhi	3	Anu Malik	
1991	Maa	1	Anu Malik	
1991	Naag Mani	1	Anu Malik	
1991	Pucca Badmash	At least 1	Usha Khanna	
1991	Saathi	1	Nadeem-Shravan	
1992	Meri Janeman	4	Babul Bose	
1992	Radha Ka Sangam	At most 6	Anu Malik	
1992	Tahalka	4	Anu Malik	
1993	Ashaant	At least 1	Jatin-Lalit	
1993	Bhagyawan	1	Anand-Milind	
1993	Boy Friend	1	Jatin-Lalit	
1993	Kohra	1	Charanjit Ahuja	
1993	Kundan	2	Bappi Lahiri	
1993	Pyar Pyar	3	Nadeem-Shravan	
1993	Shuruaat	4	Laxmikant-Pyarelal	While the film's audio release happened in 1987, the film itself was released in 1993.
1994	Aajaa Sanam	1	Arun Paudwal and Kavita Paudwal	
1994	Madam X	1	Anu Malik	This film was in the making for many years. Ajay Devgn had worked in this film as an assistant director before beginning his career as an actor with Phool Aur Kaante (1991).
1994	Main Khiladi Tu Anari	1	Anu Malik	
1994	Mohabbat Ki Arzoo	2	Laxmikant-Pyarelal	
1994	Naaraaz	1	Anu Malik	
1994	Rakhwale	1	Sonik-Omi	
1994	Zaalim	1	Anu Malik	
1995	Jawab	3	Anu Malik	
1995	Karmon Kee Sazaa	At least 1	Charanjit Ahuja	
1996	Daraar	1	Anu Malik	
1996	Namak	1	Anu Malik	
1996	Zordaar	2	Anu Malik	The audio records of this film were issued in 1989 but the film was delayed and released only in 1996.
1997	Mr. And Mrs. Khiladi	1	Anu Malik	
1997	Baba	1 (All)	Manjit Arora	
1997	Dil Kitna Nadaan Hai	1	Anu Malik	
1997	Diwana Tere Dilka	2	Laxmikant-Pyarelal	The film was launched with the title Mohabbat Ki Aag. Its audio records were also released in 1987 with this title. However, the film itself was delayed and released in 1997 as Diwana Tere Dilka.
1997	Do Aankhen Barah Hath	1	Bappi Lahiri	This film was in the making for 3 years. It had an audio release in 1994 and another one in 1997.
1998	Saazish	2	Jatin-Lalit	
1998	Sherkhan	At least 1	Bappi Lahiri	
2004	Hatya : The Murder	2	Nadeem-Shravan	Work on this film started in 1992. It was delayed by many years and eventually released only in 2004. Posthomous and last release.

== Awards ==
- Filmfare Best Lyricist Award - 1972 for Zindagi Ek Safar Hai Suhana (Andaz, (1971)
- Filmfare Best Lyricist Award - 1967 for the song Baharo Phool Barsao [Suraj (1966 film)]
- Josh Malihabadi Award, from Urdu Conference
- Dr. Ambedkar Award, for Jhanak Jhanak Tori Baaje Payaliya [Mere Huzoor (1968)], a Brajbhasha song
- Jaipuri was also awarded a doctorate degree from the World University Round Table.

== See also ==
- Shankar Jaikishan
- Shailendra
- Majrooh Sultanpuri
- Gulzar
- Indeevar
- Javed Akhtar
- Sahir Ludhianvi
