= Patthar Ke Sanam =

- Patthar Ke Sanam movie poster
- Directed by: Raja Nawathe
- Written by: Gulshan Nanda
- Produced by: A.A Nadiadwala
- Starring: Manoj Kumar; Waheeda Rehman; Pran; Mumtaz
- Cinematography: Sudhin Majumdar
- Edited by: Babubhai Thakkar
- Music by: Laxmikant Pyarelal
- Release date: 1967
- Country: India
- Language: Hindi

Patthar Ke Sanam (Hindustani: पत्थर के सनम, پتھر کے صنم "hard-hearted lover"; lit. '"idol of stone"') is a 1967 Indian Hindi-language movie. Produced by the Nadiadwalas, the film is directed by Raja Nawathe. It stars Manoj Kumar, Waheeda Rehman, Mumtaz, Pran, Mehmood, Lalita Pawar and Aruna Irani. The movie features many hit songs of the era, composed by the legendary Laxmikant Pyarelal and veteran lyricist Majrooh Sultanpuri, such as the ever-haunting Patthar Ke Sanam, rendered in the voice of Mohammad Rafi. The film stood ninth in the Box-Office Top Ten List of 1967.

== Plot ==
The story revolves around two friends, Meena and Taruna. Meena lives a wealthy lifestyle along with her widowed dad, Thakur, in a small town in India. Taruna is her assistant as well as her best friend. Meena, while coming to her village from town, meets Rajesh, who teases her. When Meena's father hires a new manager, she learns that he is the same person she met on the train. She, along with Taruna, try to tease Rajesh by pretending to be in love with him. He finds out and pretends that he has fallen in love with both. As a result, both women end up falling in love with him for real, and Thakur is ready to permit Meena to wed Rajesh.

Meena makes it clear that she wants Rajesh for herself and reminds Taruna that she had been engaged to Lala Bhagatram, when Taruna was a child. Lala Bhagatram is a local contractor who takes the contract for Thakur’s fruit orchard’s produce every year, he pays very less for the contract, and Rajesh ensures he gives only have the estates produce to Bhagatram on contract, angering Bhagatram who is a nasty man, he keeps reminding Taruna in public that he will marry as per the childhood promise. His sister Gauri is in love with Haria, who is a servant in Thakur’s house.

Then Rajesh is assaulted by some men and his mother, Shanti, comes over to looks after him. When Thakur sees her, he remembers that he had murdered her husband for his wealth. Shanti has a secret, that Meena is actually her daughter and Rajesh is Thakur's son. She wants them to get married so that she can be the owner of all the wealth again. Shanti begs Taruna to go away from Rajesh or else her plan will fail. Taruna agrees and pretends she doesn't love Rajesh. But Rajesh only loves Taruna and is emotionally hurt. Taruna can't take this anymore and decides to kill herself. Haria - reveals that she is not dead, but Lala Bhagatram has kept her in captivity along with his sister Gauri, who object to him kidnapping Taruna.

Rajesh goes and fights all the goons including Lala Bhagatram, but is beaten by them. Gauri and Taruna are transferred somewhere else with someone watching them constantly. Gauri's tied hands are freed by Taruna by cleverly avoiding the watchful eyes of the goons. Gauri jumps from the window and informs Rajesh. Rajesh goes and frees Taruna. In this fighting, Meena dies, Lala Bhagatram is killed by Thakur and Thakur is taken in custody. Shanti wants to leave, but Rajesh and Taruna insist that she stay with them. Haria and Gauri marry as well.

== Cast ==
- Waheeda Rehman as Taruna
- Manoj Kumar as Rajesh
- Mumtaz as Meena Thakur
- Mehmood as Haria 'Rajendra Kumar'
- Lalita Pawar as Shanti
- Ramayan Tiwari as Thakur (as Tiwari)
- Raj Mehra as Shyamlal
- Pran as Lala Bhagatram
- Mumtaz Begum as Haria's mother / Thakur's maidservant
- Jankidas as Mr. Poojari (as Jankidass)
- N.K. Misra as (as the Late N.K. Misra)
- Aruna Irani as Gauri
- Uma Dutt as Man in purple turban (member of the Panch)
- Maqbool (as Muqbool)

== Soundtrack ==
Patthar Ke Sanam

Soundtrack album by Laxmikant–Pyarelal
- Released: 1967
- Genre: film soundtrack
- Length: 31:00
- Language: Hindi
- Label: His Master's Voice

Laxmikant–Pyarelal chronology
Shagird (1967)	Patthar Ke Sanam (1967)	Night in London (1967)

The soundtrack of Patthar Ke Sanam is composed by the duo Laxmikant–Pyarelal with lyrics by Majrooh Sultanpuri. The music album was released on vinyl lp by His Master's Voice in 1967, and consisted of 7 songs sung by singers Mukesh, Mohammad Rafi, Lata Mangeshkar and Asha Bhosle.

All lyrics are written by Majrooh Sultanpuri; all music is composed by Laxmikant–Pyarelal

Original vinyl track listing
No.	Title	Singer(s)	Length
1.	"Patthar Ke Sanam"	Mohammad Rafi	5:13
2.	"Koi Nahin Hai"	Lata Mangeshkar	4:41
3.	"Aye Dushman-e-Jaan"	Asha Bhosle	4:59
4.	"Bataoon Kya Lana"	Lata Mangeshkar	4:30
5.	"Mehboob Mere"	Lata Mangeshkar & Mukesh	4:48
6.	"Tauba Yeh Matwali Chaal"	Mukesh	7:22
7.	"Dushman Hai Zamana"	Mohammed Rafi, Mehmood & Chorus	4:30
Total length:			31:00
