= Saazish =

Saazish may refer to:

- Saazish (1975 film), a 1975 Indian Hindi-language (Bollywood) action film
- Saazish (1988 film), a 1988 Indian Hindi-language feature film
- Saazish (1998 film), a 1998 Indian Hindi-language feature film
