= Bluff Master (1963 film) =

1963 film by Manmohan Desai

- Directed by: Manmohan Desai
- Written by: Screenplay: Manmohan Desai; Dialogues: Rajinder Krishan
- Story by: Madhusudan Kalelkar
- Produced by: Subhash Desai
- Starring: Shammi Kapoor; Saira Banu; Pran; Lalita Pawar
- Music by: Kalyanji-Anandji
- Release date: 1963
- Running time: 135 min
- Country: India
- Language: Hindi

Bluff Master is a Bollywood drama movie released in 1963 directed by Manmohan Desai starring Shammi Kapoor, Saira Banu, Pran, and Lalita Pawar.

== Plot ==
Ashok (Shammi Kapoor) is on the lookout for a job. But that does not stop him from putting on airs and bluffing, pretending that he is from a rich family. As luck would have it, he gets the job of a photographer for a fictitious tabloid—Bhukump—only to lose it, because he had the misfortune to click the photograph of the owner's daughter Seema (Saira Banu) slapping an eve teaser.

Never one to give up, he somehow meets her and convinces her of his good intentions. When she falls in love with him, Ashok tries to give up bluffing. But it is too late as no one believes him now.

== Cast ==
- Shammi Kapoor as Ashok Azad
- Saira Banu as Seema
- Pran as Mr. Kumar
- Lalita Pawar as Ashok's mother
- Mohan Choti as a Babu
- Amol Sen as stage announcer
- Jugal Kishore as man doing push up
- Maqsood as man at bus stop
- Niranjan Sharma
- Tun Tun
- Rashid Khan
- Shyam Lal
- Anand Joshi
- Charlie Walker
- Laxmi Chhaya aa a Seema's friend (uncredited)
- Edwina as a Dancer (uncredited)

== Soundtrack ==
Lyrics & Dialogues by Rajendra Krishan

#	Title	Singer(s)	Raga
1	"Ae Dil Ab Kahin Le Ja"	Hemant Kumar	
2	"Bedardi Daghabaaz"	Lata Mangeshkar	Bageshri
3	"Chali Chali Kaisi Hawa Yeh"	Shamshad Begum, Usha Mangeshkar	
4	"Govinda Aala Re Aala"	Mohammed Rafi	
5	"Husn Chala Kuchh Aisi Chaal"	Lata Mangeshkar, Mohammed Rafi	
6	"Jabse Tujhe Jaan Gayi"	Lata Mangeshkar	
7	"Socha Tha Pyar Ham Na Karenge"	Mukesh	
8	"Title Music"		
