= Sehra (film) =

- Directed by: V. Shantaram
- Produced by: V. Shantaram
- Starring: Sandhya; Prashant; Lalita Pawar; Manmohan Krishan; Mumtaz
- Cinematography: Krishanrao Vashirde
- Music by: Ramlal
- Production company: Rajkamal Kalamandir
- Release date: 1963
- Running time: 151 minutes
- Country: India
- Language: Hindi

Sehra (Desert) is a 1963 Hindi romantic family drama film directed by V. Shantaram, who also wrote the screenplay. The story and dialogue writer was Shams Lucknowi. Made by Shantaram Productions, it had music composed by Ramlal with lyrics by Hasrat Jaipuri. The actress Mumtaz played a small character role in this film and also in Shantaram's earlier Stree (1961). The film starred Sandhya, Prashant, Mumtaz, Lalita Pawar, Manmohan Krishan, Ulhas, Babloo, M. Rajan and Baburao Pendharkar.

Krishanrao Vashirde won the Best Cinematography (Colour) Filmfare Awards. This was the first of the two Filmfare awards he won. He was to win again in the same category for Geet Gaya Patharon Ne (1964). He also won the "newly instituted" A. J. Patel Award for Best Colour Cinematography, where he received Rs. 5000 as cash award.

The film, set against the backdrop of Rajasthan, is about a rivalry between two clans and the situation that takes a melodramatic violent turn when the children of the opposing family fall in love.

== Plot ==
Sherpal (Ulhas) and Tailab (Manmohan Krishan) are chiefs of two opposing clans who regularly meet at an annual competition that highlights their combative strengths in fields of weaponry. Sherpal's daughter Angara (Sandhya) is a tomboy who has been taught all that is required for the competition. She defeats Vikram (Prashanth) who is from the clan of Taibal. The two fall in love, but cannot marry due to the old feud between their clans. Angara's mother (Lalita Pawar) is after her to behave like a girl and dress accordingly. She finally gives in to her mother's demands. When her father dies, Mangal (M. Rajan) appears claiming to be her betrothed, chosen by her father. When things start taking a violent turn, she agrees to marry him. Mangal then treats her badly after marriage. Angara suffers the humiliation and even carries a heavy weight across the desert, a punishment meted out to her by Mangal. As she trudges through the desert, she comes across a dying Vikram, who asks for water. She attempts to give him water against her husband's wishes, and is shot by Mangal. Angara and Vikram die together.

== Cast ==
- Sandhya as Angara
- Prashanth as Vikram
- Manmohan Krishna as Chief Tailab
- Lalita Kumari as Tailab's wife
- Lalita Pawar as Angara's mother
- Baburao Pendharkar
- Babloo
- Ulhas as Chief Sherpal
- Keshavrao Date
- Jeetendra in a small role
- Mumtaz as Juhi
- M. Rajan as Mangal

== Crew ==
The crew for the film consisted of:

- Producer: V. Shantaram
- Director: V. Shantaram
- Music: Ramlal
- Lyrics: Hasrat Jaipuri
- Editing: V. Shantaram
- Cinematography: Krishnarao Vashirdi
- Art Direction: Kanu Desai
- Make-up: Baba Vardam
- Art: Baburao Jadhav
- Choreographer: Shyam Kumar
- Audiographer: Mangesh Desai

== Awards ==
Filmfare Best Cinematographer Award: Krishnarao Vashirde

== Soundtrack ==
Some of the popular songs of the film were "Taqdeer Ka Fasana" in male and female solos by Lata Mangeshkar and Mohammed Rafi, "Pankh Hote To Ud Aati, Rasiyaa O Zalima" by Lata Mangeshkar, and two duets by Mohammed Rafi and Lata Mangeshkar "Tum To Pyar Ho Sajni" and "Ja Ja Ja Re Tujhe Hum Jaan Gaye". With music direction by Ramlal and lyrics by Hasrat Jaipuri, the playback singers were Lata Mangeshkar, Mohammed Rafi, Asha Bhosle and Hemant Kumar.

=== Song list ===
#	Song	Singer	Raga
1	"Mast Nazar Ki Katar"	Mohammed Rafi	
2	"Taqdeer Ka Fasana"	Mohammed Rafi	Desh
3	"Ja Ja Ja Re Tujhe Hum Jaan Gaye"	Mohammed Rafi, Lata Mangeshkar	
4	"Tum To Pyar Ho Sajni"	Mohammed Rafi, Lata Mangeshkar	Maru Bihag
5	"Taqdeer Ka Fasana"	Lata Mangeshkar	Desh
6	"Pankh Hote To Ud Aati"	Lata Mangeshkar	Bhoopali
7	"Ujad Gaya Hain Mohabbat Main"	Lata Mangeshkar	
8	"Na Ghar Tera, Na Ghar Mera"	Hemant Kumar	
9	"Hum Hain Nashe Mein"	Asha Bhosle	
