= Ghar Ka Chirag =

Ghar Ka Chiraag
- Film poster
- Directed by: Jagdev Bhambri
- Written by: Shivaji Rathor
- Produced by: Jagdev Bhambri
- Starring: Dharmendra; Waheeda Rehman; Biswajit; Balraj Sahni
- Cinematography: C. M. Rele
- Edited by: Hrishikesh Mukherjee
- Music by: Madan Mohan
- Distributed by: Jagat Enterprises
- Release date: 1967
- Running time: 157 minutes
- Country: India
- Language: Hindi

Ghar Ka Chirag (The Lamp That Lights The Home) is a 1967 Hindi social family melodrama film of Indian cinema. It was produced and directed by Jagdev Bhambri, who also wrote the screenplay. The lyricist was Kaifi Azmi, with music composed by Madan Mohan. The ensemble cast includes Balraj Sahni, Waheeda Rehman, Dharmendra, Biswajit, Indrani Mukherjee and Abhi Bhattacharya.

Ghar Ka Chirag was one of three children's films released in 1967 which "sought to portray the experiences of children placed in rather peculiar circumstances".

The story revolves round a group of children who are kidnapped and then maimed by the ring-leader of a beggar's gang. In the process, unintentionally, the leader's son is blinded and made to beg. Though not a success at the box-office, the film received a three out of five star rating in Collections.

== Cast ==
- Balraj Sahni
- Waheeda Rehman
- Biswajit (special appearance)
- Dharmendra (special appearance)
- Indrani Mukherjee
- Abhi Bhattacharya
- Chand Usmani
- Dev Kumar

== Plot ==
Madho suffers through misfortunes in his life. Unable to bear the anguish anymore, he leaves his wife and small child, moving to Bombay. From being a good man, he reinvents himself by turning into the vicious Kalu, who kidnaps children and maims them then makes them beg on the streets. After several years, his son Birju, now a grown boy, leaves the village to search for his father and comes to Bombay. Here he is ensnared in Kalu's gang and blinded. He is then sent to beg with the other children.

== Music ==
The music direction was by Madan Mohan and the lyrics were by Kaifi Azmi. The film included two songs sung by Lata Mangeshkar, three by Asha Bhosle and one by Mohammed Rafi.

Song	Singer
"Ek Paise Ka Sawaal Hai"	Lata Mangeshkar
"Aao Aao Tumhe Bataaoon"	Lata Mangeshkar
"Jaane Kaise Chori Chori"	Asha Bhosle
"Ae Mahalon Mein Rehnewalon"	Asha Bhosle
"Jaane Mera Chanda Khoya Hai"	Asha Bhosle
"Aaj Rota Hai Kyun"	Mohammed Rafi
