= Gopi (1970 film) =

- Film poster
- Directed by: A. Bhimsingh
- Written by: Shailajanand Mukherjee
- Produced by: T. S. Muthuswamy; S. S. Palaniappan
- Starring: Dilip Kumar; Saira Banu; Pran; Om Prakash
- Cinematography: Faredoon A. Irani
- Edited by: A. Pauldorai Singham
- Music by: Kalyanji-Anandji
- Production company: Prosperity Pictures
- Release date: 1970
- Running time: 2 hours 23 min
- Country: India
- Language: Hindi

Gopi is a 1970 Hindi-language action drama film produced by T. S. Muthuswami & S. S. Palaniappan and directed by A. Bhimsingh. The film stars Dilip Kumar, Saira Banu in the lead roles, along with Pran, Om Prakash, Nirupa Roy, Farida Jalal, Johnny Walker, Ramayan Tiwari, Mukri, Sudesh Kumar, Durga Khote, Lalita Pawar in other important roles. The music was composed by Kalyanji-Anandji. This film is remembered for classic acting by Om Prakash and Dilip Kumar. As reported by Box Office India, Gopi was a big hit at the box office.

== Premise ==
A man stays with his brother in a village and is falsely accused of theft by the landlord. When his brother throws him out, he goes to the city and vows to return only after making money.

== Cast ==
- Dilip Kumar as Gopiram "Gopi"
- Saira Banu as Seema
- Pran as Lala
- Om Prakash as Girdharilal
- Nirupa Roy as Parvati
- Farida Jalal as Nandini
- Johnny Walker as Ramu
- Ramayan Tiwari as Hariram
- Mukri as Ramlal
- Sudesh Kumar as Kumar
- Durga Khote as Ranimaa
- Lalita Pawar as Leelavati
- Shyamlal
- Aruna Roy

== Awards ==
- 1971: Filmfare Best Actor Award: Dilip Kumar (nominated)

== Music ==
The film's music is by Kalyanji-Anandji and the lyrics were written by Rajinder Krishan.

Song	Singer
"Akele Hi Akele Chala Hai"	Lata Mangeshkar
"Ek Padosan Peeche Pad Gayi Junglee Jiska Naam"	Lata Mangeshkar & Mahendra Kapoor
"Gentleman Gentleman Gentleman Gentleman"	Lata Mangeshkar & Mahendra Kapoor
"Ramchandra Keh Gaye"	Mahendra Kapoor
"Sukh Ke Sab Saathi"	Mohammed Rafi
