= Hare Kanch Ki Chooriyan =

1967 film by Kishore Sahu

- Directed by: Kishore Sahu
- Written by: Kishore Sahu
- Produced by: Kishore Sahu
- Starring: Biswajeet; Naina Sahu; Shiv Kumar; Helen; Nazir Hussain
- Cinematography: K. H. Kapadia
- Edited by: Kantilal B. Shukla
- Music by: Shanker Jaikishan
- Production company: Kishore Sahu Productions
- Release date: 1967
- Running time: 165 min
- Country: India
- Language: Hindi

Hare Kanch Ki Chooriyan (Green Glass Bangles) is a 1967 Hindi, social family drama film, produced and directed by Kishore Sahu. The story, screenplay and dialogue were written by Kishore Sahu. Shankar Jaikishan composed the music while the lyrics were written by Hasrat Jaipuri and Shailendra. Sahu presented his daughter Naina Sahu, in her debut acting role, as the main character. The film starred Biswajeet, Naina Sahu, Shiv Kumar, Nazir Hussain, Rajendranath, Helen and Lalita Pawar.

The story revolves around a young medical student Mohini (Naina Sahu), whose life changes radically when she becomes pregnant. Shunned by society and friends the film focuses on her determination to face society as an unwed mother.

== Plot ==
Mohini (Naina Sahu) is a medical student, and lives at home with her father Kishenlal Saxena (Nazir Hussain), a college Professor, and her ailing mother. Her neighbours are Bipin (Shiv Kumar) and his parents. Bipin and his friends have just returned to their town from Bombay after completing their studies. One of Bipin's friends, Ravi Mehra (Biswajeet), is the son of a wealthy businessman, Amarchand Mehra (Sapru). Ravi and Mohini meet and fall in love. Bipin also loves Mohini but has never expressed his feelings. When Ravi leaves to go abroad for further studies, he promises he will get green bangles for her, as a symbol of marriage. However, soon after he leaves, Mohini is told by their family doctor that she is pregnant. Vilified and expelled from college, her father is her only support especially since her mother dies soon after hearing the news.

Ravi's father is against Mohini and Ravi's marriage, and he creates situations where Ravi is unable to return to India for another year and a half. Mehra also insults the Professor and his daughter when they come to inform him of Mohini's pregnancy. Bipin comes forward and offers to marry Mohini, but she refuses saying she will wait for Ravi. However, instead of returning home as planned, Ravi goes to the US with his father. An angry Mohini refuses to acknowledge his letters, intending to face the situation alone. Bipin's mother Maya (Lalita Pawar), is at first horrified but soon comes round when her husband (S. N. Bannerjee) talks to her about Mohini's predicament. Maya then starts helping Mohini, first with her pregnancy and then in taking care of the infant. With Maya's acceptance, the other town people also start accepting Mohini. Ravi returns from the US, but his father creates further misunderstanding when he lies to him about Mohini giving birth to Bipin's child. Ravi's father arranges his marriage with his associate's daughter, Pushpa (Helen), who is keen to marry Ravi. During the marriage procession Ravi meets up with his child and Mohini. They clear up their misunderstandings created by his father, and preparations for Ravi and Mohini's wedding begin with the blessings Ravi's mother.

== Cast ==
- Biswajeet as Ravi Kumar Mehra
- Naina Sahu as Mohini
- Shiv Kumar s Dr. Bipin Bose
- Rajendranath as Jimmy
- Helen as Pushpa Malhotra
- Nazir Hussain as Prof. Kishanlal Saxena
- Achala Sachdev as Radha Saxena
- Sapru as Amarchand Mehra
- Mridula Rani as Mrs. Kamla Mehra
- S. N. Banerjee as Bipin’s father
- Asrani as Tripathi, college friend
- Meena T.
- Jankidas as storekeeper
- Brahm Bhardwaj as Dr. Dixit
- Vikram Sahu
- Tun Tun

== Crew ==
The film crew consisted of:

- Producer: Kishore Sahu
- Director: Kishore Sahu
- Associate producers: Preeti Sahu, Rohit Sahu
- Cinematography: K. H. Kapadia
- Title Designed: Parduman
- Editing: Kantilal B. Shukla
- Art Direction and set decoration: Sant Singh
- Make-up: P.G/ Joshi, Prem Kumar
- Music: Shanker Jaikishan
- Lyrics: Hasrat Jaipuri and Shailendra
- Song Recordist: Minoo Katrak
- Choreographer: P. L. Raj

== Soundtrack ==
Two of the popular songs were "Baj Uthengi Hare Kaanch Ki Chooriyan" sung by Asha Bhosle, and "Panchhi Re" sung by Mohammed Rafi and Asha Bhosle. The music composers were Shankar Jaikishan and the lyricists were Hasrat Jaipuri and Shailendra. The other singer in the film was Sharda, a Shankar protégé, who sang three of the six songs.

=== Songs ===
#	Title	Singer	Lyricist
1	"Hare Kanch Ki Chooriyan"	Asha Bhosle	Shailendra
2	"Panchchee Re O Panchchee"	Mohammed Rafi, Asha Bhosle	Shailendra
3	"Aye Jaan-E-Man Legaya Dil Ko Woh Tera Bholapan"	Mohammed Rafi	Hasrat Jaipuri
4	"Hay Kahan Chala Re, Wahan Tera Kaun"	Sharda	Shailendra
5	"Milan Ki Raat Hai Khushi Ke Rang Mein"	Sharda	Hasrat Jaipuri
6	Le Ja Dil Hai Tera Le Ja	Sharda	Hasrat Jaipuri
