= Pocket Maar (1974 film) =

- Film Poster
- Directed by: Ramesh Lakhanpal
- Written by: Vrajendra Gaur (dialogue)
- Screenplay by: Kaushal Bharati; Shashi Bhushan (additional screenplay)
- Story by: Mushtaq Jalili
- Produced by: Ramesh Lakhanpal, Joginder Singh Luthra
- Starring: Dharmendra; Saira Banu; Prem Chopra
- Cinematography: Kishore Rege
- Edited by: Pran Mehra
- Music by: Laxmikant Pyarelal
- Release date: 1974
- Running time: 136 min.
- Country: India
- Language: Hindi

Pocket Maar (transl. Pickpocket) is a 1974 Hindi film directed by Ramesh Lakhanpal. The film stars Dharmendra, Saira Banu, Prem Chopra, Mehmood and Nasir Hussain. The music was composed by Laxmikant Pyarelal. The film took 4 years in the making.

== Cast ==
- Dharmendra as Shankar
- Saira Banu as Asha Rai
- Prem Chopra as Madan Malhotra
- Mehmood as Sunder
- Nazir Hussain as Mr. Rai
- Shubha Khote as Sheela Verma
- Azra as Ganga
- Asit Sen as Dr. Sen
- Amol Sen as Subedar
- Praveen Paul as Mrs. Verma
- Keshav Rana as Pran Lal
- Shanti Swaroop
- Prem Mannade
- Masood
- Baldev Mehta
- Radheshyam

== Crew ==
- Director = Ramesh Lakhanpal
- Producer = Ramesh Lakhanpal and Joginder Singh Luthra
- Assistant Director = Roop Sharma, Vijay Maini, Roop Kumar
- Cinematography = Kishore Rege
- Film Editing = Pran Mehra
- Art Director = V. Jadhav
- Art Department = Abu Hassan Mistry
- Hair Stylist = Geeta, Flory Pattrick, Yen Young Sheish
- Sound Recordist = S.C. Bhambri
- Special Effects = Prafull Gade(main titles), Suresh Naik and M.A. Hafeez(special effects)
- Costumes : Naseem Banu (Saira Banu's costumes), Kashinath, Dhiren Kumar and Shantaram Prabhulkar (Dress)
- Choreographer: Suresh Bhatt, Kamal, Surya Kumar, P.L. Raj

== Soundtrack ==
The lyrics for the film songs were written by Anand Bakshi, and the music was composed by Laxmikant–Pyarelal.

No.	Title	Singer(s)	Length
1.	"Banda Parwar Mai Kaha Ye Aapki Mahfil Kaha"	Mohammed Rafi	3:59
2.	"Na Tujhse Dur Ja Saku"	Mohammed Rafi	3:23
3.	"Dushmani Hai Ye To Mohabbat Nahi"	Asha Bhosle
4.	"Chori Se Chupke Se Le Ke Tera Naam"	Lata Mangeshkar	4:34
5.	"Hum Jaan Lada Denge"	Manna Dey
6.	"Uyi Kya Hua Ho Gaya"	Manna Dey, Asha Bhosle
