= Jaane-Anjaane =

Jaane-Anjaane (1971 Film)
- Poster
- Directed by: Shakti Samanta
- Written by: Madhusudan Kalelkar
- Produced by: Shakti Samanta
- Starring: Shammi Kapoor; Vinod Khanna; Leena Chandavarkar; Sandhya Roy; Sulochana Latkar
- Cinematography: Aloke Das Gupta
- Edited by: Govind Dalwadi
- Music by: Shankar Jaikishan; Hasrat Jaipuri (lyrics); S. H. Bihari (lyrics); Gulshan Bawra (lyrics)
- Release date: 1971
- Running time: 2 hours 19 min
- Country: India
- Language: Hindi

Jaane-Anjaane (lit. 'The known, the unknown') is a 1971 Bollywood drama film directed by Shakti Samanta. The film stars Shammi Kapoor, Vinod Khanna and Leena Chandavarkar.

== Cast ==
- Shammi Kapoor as Ram Prasad 'Ramu'
- Leena Chandavarkar as Mala
- Vinod Khanna as Inspector Hemant
- Jayant as Shankar
- Sandhya Roy as Koyli
- Helen as Suzy
- Sulochana Latkar as Shobha
- Lalita Pawar as Laxmi
- K.N. Singh as Poonamchand
- Dhumal as Dhondu
- Sajjan as Hemant's Father
- Gulshan Bawra as Munnu
- Birbal as Chunnu
- Murad as Judge
- Sachin Pilgaonkar as Young Ramu

== Plot ==
Additional information needed While on a religious pilgrimage, Laxmi Prasad finds an abandoned baby at a temple, when she sees no around, she decides to keep him. When her husband, Shankar, returns from jail, they name the child Ramu. While Laxmi wants him to go to school, study and become someone important, Shankar wants him to gamble, partner him in bootlegging and smuggling. Ramu is unable to fit in school and decides to work with his dad. Thus Ramu grows up accepting crime as his career. Then a young woman named Mala enters his life, and both fall in love with each other. When Mala finds out about Ramu's career, she makes him promise that he will go straight. He does go straight, gets a job, and when he is laid off he takes to helping Dhondu catch fish. Then Ramu's world gets turned upside when Inspector Hemant, while apprehending Shankar, guns down Laxmi. An enraged Ramu decides that he must kill Hemant at any cost. Watch what impact this will have on Hemant's mom, his dad, and Mala herself as she watches Ramu descent into the very hell that she had tried to redeem him from.

== Soundtrack ==
The soundtrack was composed by Shankar Jaikishan. The lyrics were penned by Hasrat Jaipuri, S. H. Bihari and Gulshan Bawra.

#	Song	Singer
1	"Jane Anjane Log Mile"	Kishore Kumar
2	"Jane Anjane Yahan Sabhi Hai"	Sharda
3	"Chham Chham Baaje Re Payaliya"	Manna Dey
4	"Aaya Apni Nagariya Mein"	Manna Dey, Suman Kalyanpur
5	"Teri Neeli Neeli Ankhon Ki"	Mohammed Rafi, Lata Mangeshkar
6	"Mohe Jaal Mein Phansae Liyo"	Lata Mangeshkar
7	"Ram Kasam Bura Na Manoongi"	Asha Bhosle
