= Faisla =

1988 film directed by S. Ramanathan

- Directed by: S. Ramanathan
- Starring: Ashok Kumar; Vinod Khanna; Vinod Mehra; Saira Banu
- Music by: R. D. Burman
- Release date: 10 June 1988
- Country: India
- Language: Hindi

Faisla is a 1988 Indian Hindi language action film directed by S. Ramanathan. The film stars Ashok Kumar, Vinod Khanna, Vinod Mehra, Saira Banu, with Sujit Kumar, Ranjeet, Bindu, Mehmood in supporting roles. The music was composed by R. D. Burman.

== Plot ==
Three convicts escape from prison to avenge the rape and death of one of their daughter and get involved in a mansion's mystery involving the death of the owner, allegedly at the hands of his son; and the accidental loss of sight by his daughter and the cruel heartless thugs who will kill anyone who stand in their way, including each other.

== Cast ==
- Ashok Kumar as Rehman
- Vinod Khanna as Birju
- Vinod Mehra as CID Inspector Ashok Verma / Bansi
- Saira Banu as Radha
- Sujit Kumar as Vikram
- Ranjeet as Rana
- Bindu as Rita
- Mehmood as Jaggu

== Soundtrack ==
All songs are music by R. D. Burman.

Song	Singer
"Dulha Raja Mera Ghode Pe Aayega"	Kishore Kumar, Asha Bhosle
"Koi To Aaye Re"	Asha Bhosle
"Andheri Hai Raat"	Asha Bhosle
"Champa Khili Daar, Palak Jhoole Pyaar"	Mohammed Rafi, Asha Bhosle
