= Aman (film) =

- Directed by: Mohan Kumar
- Produced by: Mohan Kumar
- Music by: Shankar Jaikishan
- Release date: 1967
- Country: India
- Language: Hindi

Aman is a 1967 Indian anti-war film directed by Mohan Kumar. It stars Rajendra Kumar, Saira Banu, Balraj Sahani and Chetan Anand. The film was also the debut for Naseeruddin Shah who played an uncredited minor role.

It also features a rare cameo by British Nobel laureate Bertrand Russell. It was shot in England and Japan.

== Plot ==
During World War-II, Rangoon is bombed and many dwellers and their families flee to nearby jungles. Balraj Sahni and his wife and son also have to leave their home. In the jungle, bombing continues and his wife dies in a bomb-strike. Balraj Sahni later becomes a rich lawyer in India and his son Dr. Gautam (Rajendra Kumar) is a UK trained doctor who volunteers to go to Japan to help deal with the horror of the radiation aftermath of Hiroshima and Nagasaki. Lord Bertrand Russell in London, gives Gautam his blessings and best wishes for his travel to Japan. Russell, a pacifist and anti-war thinker (who appears in a cameo role) sets the tone of this 1967 film. Balraj Sahni reluctantly allows his son Dr. Gautam (Rajendra Kumar) to go to Japan. On arrival in Japan Dr Gautam takes up a role in a hospital for nuclear diseases. Meloda (Saira Banu) who was educated in India, speaks Hindi; though she is Japanese, meets Dr. Gautam in a Buddha park in Japan. Meloda's father Dr Akhira (Chetan Anand) is owner of the hospital where Dr. Gautam works. The storyline takes us through the stark and sometimes gory suffering that radiation victims endured; as a stark reminder of the long term damage caused by atomic weapons. When a group of fishermen are exposed to radiation from French nuclear tests in the Pacific, Dr Gautam mounts a daring rescue to help save the fishermen. Battling angry elements Dr. Gautam helps the fishermen survive, saving every last one of them - but at what cost? When viewed in the context of India-Japan relationship, beginning with the arrival of Buddhism in Japan, formation of the Indo-Japan Society in 1905 and Japan's support for Subhash Chandra Bose's INA, this film takes on a meaning beyond a love story. It is a cry against the horrors of atomic weapons, the enduring damage they inflict and martyrdom for a cause.

== Cast ==
- Rajendra Kumar as Dr. Gautamdas
- Saira Banu as Meloda
- Om Prakash as Hurato
- Balraj Sahni as Gautamdas' father
- Jagjit Singh (cameo)
- Bertrand Russell (cameo)
- Chetan Anand as Dr. Akhira, Meloda's father
- Naseeruddin Shah as extra in a crowd

== Soundtrack ==
The music was composed by Shankar Jaikishan.

Song title	Singer	Lyricist
"Aaj Ki Raat Ye Kaisi Raat Ke Humko Nind Nahi Aati"	Mohammed Rafi, Saira Banu	Shailendra
"Surahidar Gardan Koyal Si Hai Aavaz"	Mohammed Rafi	Hasrat Jaipuri
"Ae Husn Pari Chehra"	Mohammed Rafi	Shailendra, Hasrat Jaipuri
"Apne Piya Ki Prem Pujarin Karke Baithi Singaar"	Lata Mangeshkar	Hasrat Jaipuri
"Aman Kaa Farishtaa Kahaan Jaa Rahaa Hai"	Mohammed Rafi	Hasrat Jaipuri
"Mera Watan Japan Kitna Hasin Hai"	Lata Mangeshkar	Hasrat Jaipuri
"Jis Raah Se Guzaroon Tu Mere Surahidar Gardan Koyal" (Sad)	Mohammed Rafi	Hasrat Jaipuri
"Barbaad Hiroshima Ki Tasveer Dekh Lo"	Mohammed Rafi	Prem Dhawan
