= Diwana (1967 film) =

- Poster
- Directed by: Mahesh Kaul
- Written by: C. L. Kavish
- Produced by: Mukhram Sharma; N. C. Sippy
- Starring: Raj Kapoor; Saira Banu; Lalita Pawar
- Cinematography: S. S. Samel
- Edited by: R. V. Shrikhande
- Music by: Shankar Jaikishan; Hasrat Jaipuri (lyrics); Shailendra (lyrics)
- Production company: Anupam Chitra
- Release date: 1968
- Running time: 171 min
- Country: India
- Language: Hindi

Diwana (lit. 'Crazy lover') is a 1967 Indian Bollywood film directed by Mahesh Kaul. The film stars Raj Kapoor, Saira Banu and Lalita Pawar in pivotal roles. The film, made under the Anupam Chitra production banner had music by Shankar–Jaikishan, with lyrics by Hasrat Jaipuri and Shailendra.

== Plot ==
Pyarelal, a simple-minded and extremely naive young man, was orphaned at birth, and now lives with Fatima, a Muslim landlady who treats him like her son. Once, he sets on a journey and meets a young woman with whom he falls in love, Kamini Gupta. Sir Mayadas, the person who brought her up happens to be Pyarelal's real father. All of a sudden, Pyarelal is arrested on the charge of murder. No one believes that a harmless man like him could commit a crime, let alone kill. However, Pyarelal openly admits in court that he is indeed guilty, and demands capital punishment for it. The reason he does that is unveiled after several secrets, later on.

== Cast ==
- Raj Kapoor as Pyarelal
- Saira Banu as Kamini Gupta
- Lalita Pawar as Fatima Begum
- Kamal Kapoor as Ramdas / Sir Mayadas
- Hiralal as Chopra
- Leela Mishra as Kaki
- Kanhaiyalal Chaturvedi as Kaka
- Ravindra Kapoor as Inder Singh
- Salim Khan as Diljit Singh
- Jankidas as Chaddha
- Ulhas as Gupta
- Brahm Bhardwaj as Public Prosecutor
- Bazid Khan as Advocate S. D. Mathur
- Paul Sharma as Buta Singh
- Nasreen as Diljit Singh's sidekick
- Paul Mahendra

== Soundtrack ==
The Music of the film is composed by the maestros Shankar–Jaikishan. All songs were popular even before the release of the film being played on Radios and Binaca Geetmala 1967. Songs were sung by Mukesh & Sharda.

#	Title	Singer	Lyricist
1	"Diwana Mujhko Log Kahen"	Mukesh	Hasrat Jaipuri
2	"Ham To Jate Apne Gaon"	Mukesh	Shailendra
3	"Ae Sanam Jisne Tujhe"	Mukesh	Hasrat Jaipuri
4	"Tumhari Bhi Jai Jai"	Mukesh	Shailendra
5	"Pate Ki Baat Kahega"	Mukesh	Shailendra
6	"Taron Se Pyare"	Mukesh	Hasrat Jaipuri
7	"Tumko Sanam Pukar Ke"	Sharda	Shailendra
8	"Tumhari Bhi Jai Jai" (Female)	Sharda	Shailendra
9	"Taron Se Pyare" (Female)	Sharda	Hasrat Jaipuri

== Awards ==
- Nominated, Filmfare Best Actress Award - Saira Banu
- Nominated, Filmfare Best Music Director Award - Shankar Jaikishan
- Nominated, Filmfare Best Female Playback Award - Sharda for "Tumhari Bhi Jai Jai"
