= International Crook =

- Poster
- Directed by: Pachhi
- Produced by: Pachhi
- Starring: Dharmendra; Saira Banu; Feroz Khan
- Music by: Shankar Jaikishan
- Release date: 22 September 1974
- Running time: 138 minutes
- Countries: India; Iran
- Language: Hindi

International Crook (titled as 'Kala Bazaar' in Hindi) is a 1974 Indian-Iranian joint production action film directed Pachhi starring Dharmendra, Feroz Khan and Saira Banu.

== Plot ==
Superintendent of Police, Rajesh, is asked to take charge of a police station in Goa. Rajesh is aware that his friend, Shekhar, lives there, and he is anxious to see him. Upon arrival in Goa, Rajesh and Shekhar are delighted to see each other. Shekhar is in love with Seema, and Seema too loves him. However, Seema's mother, Lajwanti, does not approve of Shekhar, and would like Seema to marry Rajesh. When Shekhar learns of this, he steps away, so that Rajesh and Seema can marry each other. When Rajesh finds out about Shekhar's sacrifice, he decides to let Seema marry Shekhar, and shortly thereafter the wedding takes place. While Shekhar and Seema leave for their honeymoon, Rajesh commences his investigation into smuggling activities off the coast of Goa, and his investigations lead him to a suspect named Tiger. Little does Rajesh know, that Tiger is none other than Shekhar, who will do anything to protect himself from Rajesh and the police.

== Cast ==
- Dharmendra as Shekhar
- Feroz Khan as SP Rajesh
- Saira Banu as Seema
- Om Prakash aa Havaldar Rao
- Sulochana Chatterjee as Lajwanti
- Murad as Police Commissioner
- Jagdish Raj as Inspector Maria
- Jagdeep as D.D.T.
- Jayshree T. as D.D.T's girlfriend
- Sunder as Jayshree T.'s father
- Manorama as Jayshree T.'s mother
- Raj Mehra as Chief Inspector of Customs Divan Dinanath
- Hiralal (actor) as Kaka Sheth
- M. B. Shetty as Jaggu
- Rajan Haksar as Pinto
- Susheela (as Sushila)
- Rathod
- Habib as Foreman, Supervisor
- Pachhi as Jamal Pasha
- Shyam Kumar as Long John
- Gurdeep Singh as Buta Singh
- Master Shahid as young Shekhar
- Firouz
- Lili Rezvani as Yasmin
- Azar as belly dancer (in the item number "Husn-e-Iran")

== Soundtrack ==
Song and dialogues by credit given in the movie Late Aziz Kashmiri

No.	Title	Singer(s)	Length
1.	"Pyaar Ki Mujh Pe Kya Nazar Daali"	Kishore Kumar, Asha Bhosle
2.	"Poochha Jo Pyaar Kya Hai"	Kishore Kumar, Ranu Mukherjee
3.	"International Crook"	Mahendra Kapoor
4.	"Pehra Do Hoshiyaari Se"	Mahendra Kapoor
5.	"Husn-E-Iran"	Sharda
6.	"Mere Dil Mein Tu Hi Tu"	Kishore Kumar
