= Pyar Mohabbat =

- Poster
- Directed by: Shankar Mukherjee
- Produced by: Shankar Mukherjee
- Starring: Dev Anand; Saira Banu
- Music by: Shankar Jaikishan
- Release date: 1 January 1966 (India)
- Country: India
- Language: Hindi

Pyar Mohabbat (lit. 'Love and affection') is a 1966 Indian Bollywood film produced and directed by Shankar Mukherjee. It stars Dev Anand and Saira Banu in pivotal roles. The rights & IPR of this film are now owned by Ruchi Pictures.

== Plot ==
After running away from home, Prince Naresh Kumar Singh (Dev Anand) now calls himself Dilip Singh, returns home after a period of 18 years. He travels by ship, and meets Reeta Singh (Saira Banu), and after a series of misunderstandings, both fall in love with each other. When Dilip reaches Devangarh, he is shocked to find that his brother, Rana Mahesh Kumar Singh (Murad) is dead; his mother, Rajmata Rajeshwari (Durga Khote) is blind; and the throne-prince to be crowned is the Senapati Uday Singh (Premnath), who has also killed Naresh. Rajmata is convinced that her son Naresh is still alive, and will return one day, and refuses to permit Uday to ascend the throne. In order to fool the Rajmata, Uday recruits Dilip to pose as the missing prince, Naresh. How long will Uday Singh continue to pull wool over the eyes of the Rajmata? Will Dilip alias Naresh Singh survive long enough to ascend the throne, and reveal his true identity?

== Cast ==
- Dev Anand as Naresh Kumar Singh / Dilip Singh
- Saira Banu as Reeta Singh
- Prem Nath as Senapati Uday Kumar Singh
- Shashikala as Mohini
- Durga Khote as Rajmata Rajeshwari
- David Abraham as Dilip's friend
- Asit Sen as Reeta's Secretary
- Sulochana Latkar
- Harindranath Chattopadhyay as Thakur Shamsher Singh
- Tarun Bose
- Murad as Rana Mahesh Kumar Singh

== Soundtrack ==
#	Title	Singer(s)	Lyricist
1	"Tere Siva Kaun Hai Mera"	Sharda	Shailendra
2	"Tujhko Dekh Kar"	Asha Bhosle	Hasrat Jaipuri
3	"Pyar Mohabbat Ke Siva"	Mohammed Rafi, Asha Bhosle	Hasrat Jaipuri
4	"Huye Aap Naraz Khuda Khair Kare"	Mohammed Rafi	Shailendra
5	"Aaj Aaye Re Banke More Saiyan"	Usha Mangeshkar, Asha Bhosle	Shailendra
6	"Hello Hello Sun Sun Sun"	Sharda, Mohammed Rafi	Hasrat Jaipuri
7	"Dekho Dekho Madam"	Mohammed Rafi, Manna Dey	Shailendra
8	"Sab kuch hai tujh mein "	Lata Mangeshkar	Shailendra
9	"Milgayi milgayi re"	Mohammed Rafi	Hasrat Jaipuri
