= Ayee Milan Ki Bela =

1964 film

- Directed by: Mohan Kumar
- Written by: Sarshar Sailani (dialogues)
- Screenplay by: Sachin Bhowmick
- Story by: Sachin Bhowmick
- Produced by: J. Om Prakash
- Starring: Rajendra Kumar; Saira Banu; Dharmendra
- Cinematography: V. Babasaheb
- Edited by: Pratap Dave
- Music by: Shankar Jaikishan
- Release date: 1 January 1964
- Country: India
- Language: Hindi

Ayee Milan Ki Bela (transl. The Moment of Meeting Has Come) is a 1964 Indian Hindi film directed by Mohan Kumar. The film was produced by J. Om Prakash. The music is by Shankar Jaikishan. The movie has stars; Rajendra Kumar, Saira Banu, Dharmendra and Shashikala.

It is one of the rare films where Dharmendra's role had grey shades. The film was successful at the box office. The film was remade in Tamil as Oru Thaai Makkal.

== Plot ==
A rich man (Gajanan Jagirdar) is crestfallen when the nurse (Praveen Paul) tells him that his wife, Pushpa, has given birth to a dead child. Fearing that his wife will not be able to bear the news of her child's death, he is advised by the nurse to adopt one of the sons of their housemaid Laxmi (Sulochana Latkar), who has just given birth to twins. On the rich man's fervent pleas, Laxmi agrees to give him one of her sons. Shyam (Rajendra Kumar) grows up in the village with his poor mother, while his twin brother Ranjeet (Dharmendra) grows up in the city in the care of his adopted rich parents. Shyam works as a farmer in the small village. One day, he is told that a rich person Mr. Chaudhry (Nazir Hussain) has come to the village and is scheming to usurp the land of the poor farmers. However, on meeting him, Shyam realizes that Mr. Chaudhry wants to form a cooperative which will help the local farmers as they will be able to sell their crops for a better price. Shyam joins Mr. Choudhry and together they help make the lives of the farmers better. Mr. Chaudhry's daughter Barkha (Saira Banu) and Shyam fall in love with each other. Meanwhile, Ranjeet returns from abroad. Soon, it becomes apparent that he is also in love with Barkha and this starts creating misunderstandings between him and his long lost twin. Eventually, Shyam is accused of impregnating another woman, Roopa, and is also charged with stealing money. Ultimately, the charges against Shyam are proven to be false. Ranjeet becomes aware of his true identity and comes to realize his mistakes.

== Cast ==
- Rajendra Kumar as Shyam
- Saira Banu as Barkha Choudhry
- Dharmendra as Ranjit
- Nazir Hussain as Mr. Choudhry
- Shashikala as Roopa
- Sulochana Latkar as Laxmi (Shyam's mother)
- Sunder as Munshi Sridhar
- Madan Puri as Ratanlal
- Keshav Rana as Dharampal (Ratanlal's henchman)
- Mumtaz Begum as Pushpa (Ranjeet's adoptive mother)
- Gajanan Jagirdar as Pushpa's husband and Ranjeet's adoptive father
- Praveen Paul as Nurse

== Soundtrack ==
While music direction was provided by Shankar-Jaikishan, the lyrics were penned by Hasrat Jaipuri and Shailendra.

Title	Singer(s)	Lyricist
"Tum Kamsin Ho Nadaan Ho..."	Mohammed Rafi	Hasrat Jaipuri
"Bura Maan Gaye..."	Mohammed Rafi	Hasrat Jaipuri
"Main Pyar Ka Diwana..."	Mohammed Rafi	Hasrat Jaipuri
"Main Kamsin Hoon Nadan Hoon..."	Lata Mangeshkar	Hasrat Jaipuri
"Tumko Hamari Umar Lag Jaye..."	Lata Mangeshkar	Hasrat Jaipuri
"O Sanam Tere Ho Gayen Hum..."	Mohammed Rafi & Lata Mangeshkar	Shailendra
"Aa Ha Ayee Milan Ki Bela..."	Mohammed Rafi & Asha Bhosle	Shailendra

== Reception ==
The film was a big success at the box office. Shivani from India.com writes "Dharmendra’s first negative role in this film brought him greater stardom. What truly set the film apart was how it shifted Dharmendra’s trajectory in Bollywood. Having debuted just four years earlier in Dil Bhi Tera Hum Bhi Tere (1960), he had only been seen in soft, romantic or supporting roles. Ayee Milan Ki Bela not only showcased his range but also proved that he could pull off layered characters with conviction".

== Filmfare Nominations ==
- Best Actor - Rajendra Kumar
- Best Supporting Actor - Dharmendra
- Best Supporting Actress - Shashikala
