= Balidaan (1971 film) =

- Directed by: Ravi Tandon
- Screenplay by: Manoj Kumar and Balkrishna Mouj
- Story by: Manoj Kumar and Balkrishna Mouj
- Produced by: Aroon Varma
- Starring: Manoj Kumar; Saira Banu; Dev Kumar
- Cinematography: Nariman A. Irani
- Edited by: Hari Pathare
- Music by: Shankar–Jaikishan
- Production company: Varma Films Enterprises
- Distributed by: Varma Films Enterprises
- Release date: 1971
- Country: India
- Language: Hindi

Balidaan is a 1971 Bollywood drama film. The film stars Saira Banu and Manoj Kumar. The film was directed by Ravi Tandon and the story as well as the screenplay/dialog were written by Manoj Kumar and Balkishan Mouj.

== Plot ==
Central to the plot of Balidaan is a reworking of the legendary outlaw hero Robin Hood, who is believed to have robbed from the rich and given to the poor. Numerous films have adapted the Robin Hood story and several real-life people who have also followed his ideology. In this Hindi-language adaptation, Raja (Manoj Kumar) is a dacoit, a bandit who robs and kills the wealthy and then distributes this wealth to the poor, to whom he feels this wealth rightfully belonged.

A smart police officer, Ramesh Singh (Dev Kumar) is assigned by the Police Commissioner (Satyendra Kapoor) to the task of arresting Raja and bringing him to justice. Much of the movie revolves around the careful attempts made by Ramesh to capture Raja and the clever ways in which Raja and his accomplices (Bindu, Ranvir Raj, Mac Mohan) are able to retard these attempts and escape being caught by the police. During the course of these actions, a love interest develops between Raja and Sheela (Saira Banu).

Will Raja be punished ultimately for being the dacoit who looted and killed the wealthy? Will he leave a legacy for being the savior who pillaged the wealthy and returned their wealth to the poor, to whom this wealth supposedly belonged? The movie progresses with letting viewers decide whether Raja was just another bandit or a savior of the poor.

== Cast ==
- Manoj Kumar as Raja
- Saira Banu as Sheela
- Dev Kumar as Ramesh Singh
- Bindu as an accomplice of Raja
- Ranvir Raj as an accomplice of Raja
- Mac Mohan as an accomplice of Raja
- Bharat Bhushan as Suraj
- Purnima as Suraj's wife
- Satyendra Kappor as the Police Commissioner
- Man Mohan as Vijay Singh

== Songs ==
Music was composed by Shankar–Jaikishan and Verma Malik wrote the lyrics .

| # | Title | Singer |
|---|---|---|
| 1 | "O Jhoothi Mohabbat Ke Bhookhe Darinde" | Lata Mangeshkar |
| 2 | "Chale Aao Dil Mein" | Lata Mangeshkar |
| 3 | "Pranam Karo Iss Dharti Ko Jisne Diyya" | Mahendra Kapoor |
| 4 | "Haaye Haaye Re Daiyya Moyi Mai To Kyo Jawaan Huyi" | Mahendra Kapoor and Asha Bhosle |
| 5 | "Manjira Baaj Raha Chun Chun Chha Chhun" | Mahendra Kapoor |
| 6 | "Pranam Karo Iss Dharti Ko Jisne Diyya" | Krishna Kalle |
