= Mohan Kumar (director) =

Indian film director and producer

- Born: 1 June 1934; Sialkot, British India
- Died: 10 November 2017 (aged 83); Mumbai
- Occupation: film director
- Years active: 1960-1992

Mohan Kumar (1 June 1934 – 10 November 2017) was an Indian film director, producer and screenwriter, who worked in the Bollywood (Hindi) film industry of India. He was born in Sialkot in British India; after Partition, he moved to India and settled down in Bombay.

== Filmography as director ==
- 1961 -Aas Ka Panchhi
- 1962 -Anpadh
- 1964 -Ayee Milan Ki Bela
- 1964 -Aap Ki Parchhaiyan
- 1967 -Aman
- 1969 -Anjaana
- 1971 -Aap Aye Bahaar Ayee
- 1972 -Mome Ki Gudiya
- 1974 - Amir Garib
- 1976 -Aap Beati
- 1980 - Aap To Aise Na The
- 1983 -Avtaar
- 1984 -All Rounder
- 1986 -Amrit
- 1990 -Amba
- 1992 -Do Hanso Ka Joda
