= Singapore (1960 film) =

- Poster
- Directed by: Shakti Samanta
- Produced by: F.C. Mehra
- Starring: Shammi Kapoor; Padmini
- Music by: Shankar-Jaikishan
- Release date: 1960
- Running time: 135 mins
- Country: India
- Language: Hindi

Singapore is a 1960 thriller film directed by Shakti Samanta. It stars Shammi Kapoor, Padmini, Shashikala, Madan Puri, K. N. Singh, Agha, Helen and Maria Menado. An Indo-Malaya co-production, this was one of the first full length Bollywood feature films to be shot extensively in locations outside India.

== Plot ==
Shyam has deputed his manager Ramesh to sell off his rubber estate in Singapore. While going through the old records, Ramesh finds a map revealing that there is a huge treasure on the rubber estate. He immediately writes to Shyam. However, to Ramesh's surprise, neither Shyam replies to his letters, nor does he come to Singapore.

Ultimately, Shyam is contacted on the phone but the line is cut during the conversation. Failing to understand anything, Shyam flies to Singapore. Once in Singapore, Shyam learns that Ramesh has been missing since their conversation on the phone was abruptly cut off. Shyam desperately starts searching for Ramesh. He informs the police and taps every source which could lead him to Ramesh. In his search, he meets Lata, an Indian dancer, and learns that Lata's sister Shobha is infatuated with Ramesh. He starts visiting Lata's place frequently, where he meets Shivdas, Lata's Uncle.

One day, Lata, Shobha, Shivdas, and Shyam go to the rubber estate for a picnic. At the very first opportunity, Shivdas steals the map leading to the treasure from Shyam's bag. Shobha sees this and follows Shivdas into the estate. Shyam follows too, but only to realise that Shivdas has been shot by hoodlums and his body is missing. Just when he recovers from the shock, the hoodlums attack him.

Once he escapes from them and is headed to inform Lata that her uncle is dead, the police arrive to arrest Shyam with circumstantial evidence of murdering Shivdas. With Chachoo, he proves that he is not guilty, and brings down Chang's whole gang.

== Cast ==
- Shammi Kapoor as Shyam
- Padmini as Lata
- Shashikala as Shobha
- Madan Puri as Chang
- K. N. Singh as Shivdas
- Gautam Mukherjee
- Maria Menado as Maria
- Agha as Cha Choo
- Helen as Malaysian Dancer

== Soundtrack ==
The film's music was composed by the composer duo Shankar–Jaikishan. The lyrics are by Shailendra and Hasrat Jaipuri.

Song	Singer
"Singapore Singapore"	Mukesh
"Dekho Ji Dekho"	Lata Mangeshkar
"Tu Kahan Kho Gaya"	Lata Mangeshkar
"Aane Laga Jeene Ka Maza"	Lata Mangeshkar
"Hat Jao Deewane Aaye, Masti Lekar Mastane Aaye"	Lata Mangeshkar, Mohammed Rafi
"Tum Lakh Chhupana Chahoge, Par Pyar Chhupa Na Paoge"	Lata Mangeshkar, Mohammed Rafi
"Rassa Sayang Re, Rassa Sayang Sayang Re"	Lata Mangeshkar, Mohammed Rafi
"Dhokha Khayegi Na"	Mohammed Rafi
