= Aashiq (1962 film) =

1962 film

- Directed by: Hrishikesh Mukherjee
- Written by: Vishwamitter Adil
- Produced by: V.K.Dubey
- Starring: Raj Kapoor; Nanda; Padmini
- Music by: Shankar Jaikishan; Shailendra (lyrics); Hasrat Jaipuri (lyrics)
- Release date: 1962
- Country: India
- Language: Hindi

Aashiq is a 1962 Hindi movie directed by Hrishikesh Mukherjee. The film stars Raj Kapoor, Nanda, Padmini, Keshto Mukherjee and Leela Chitnis. The music of film was composed by Shankar Jaikishan.

== Cast ==
- Raj Kapoor as Gopal/Uday Kumar
- Nanda as Renu
- Padmini as Priti
- Raj Mehra as Amar Singh (Pratap's father)
- Honey Irani as Sangeeta
- Mukri as D'Souza
- Keshto Mukherjee as Bhekhu
- Abhi Bhattacharya as Pratap
- Leela Chitnis as Pratap's mother
- Nana Palsikar as Thakur (Renu's father)
- Achala Sachdev as Renu's mother
- Vishwa Mehra as hotel manager
- Parashuram as Munim
- Madhumati as Jaya Fernandes (paired with D'Souza)
- Nazir Kashmiri as doctor

== Soundtrack ==
#	Title	Singer(s)	Lyricist
1	"Yeh To Kaho Kaun Ho Tum"	Mukesh	Shailendra
2	"Tum Jo Hamare Meet Na Hote"	Mukesh	Shailendra
3	"Mehtab Tera Chehra"	Mukesh, Lata Mangeshkar	Shailendra
4	"Main Aashiq Hoon Baharon Ka"	Mukesh	Shailendra
5	"Jhanan Jhan Jhanaake Apni Payal"	Lata Mangeshkar	Shailendra
6	"Lo Aai Milan Ki Raat"	Lata Mangeshkar	Hasrat Jaipuri
7	"O Shama Mujhe Phoonk De"	Mukesh, Lata Mangeshkar	Shailendra
8	"Tum Aaj Mere Sang Hans Lo"	Mukesh	Hasrat Jaipuri
