= April Fool (1964 film) =

1964 film

- Poster
- Directed by: Subodh Mukherji
- Screenplay by: Subodh Mukherji
- Story by: Subodh Mukherji
- Produced by: Subodh Mukherji
- Starring: Biswajeet; Saira Banu
- Cinematography: N.V. Srinivas
- Edited by: V.K. Naik
- Music by: Shankar Jaikishan
- Release date: 1964
- Country: India
- Language: Hindi

April Fool is a 1964 Indian romantic comedy film written, produced and directed by Subodh Mukherji. It stars Biswajeet and Saira Banu in pivotal roles.

== Plot ==
Ashok comes from a wealthy family, headed by his father, and elder brother, Alok. Ashok is a slacker, and enjoys playing practical jokes, particularly on his favorite day: April Fools' Day, when he outdoes himself. His jokes help him befriend Madhu, and both fall in love. When one of is pranks go awry both Ashok and Madhu become targets of an international gang, and must run for their own safety, as well as for the safety of their respective families.

== Cast ==
- Biswajeet as Ashok
- Saira Banu as Madhu / Rita Christina
- Jayant as Mr. Lal
- Sajjan as Monto
- Nazima as Anu
- Shivraj as Ashok's Uncle
- Ram Avtar as Hotel Manager
- Ruby Mayer as Rita's Mother
- Rajan Haskar as Rasik (as Rajen Haksar)
- Chand Usmani as Mrs. Brijlal Sinha
- I. S. Johar as Mr. Brijlal Sinha
- M.B. Shetty as Shetty
- Vinod (cameo appearance)
- Pradeep Gupta (cameo appearance)
- Ratan Gaurang as Gaurang
- Dev Kapal (cameo appearance)

== Soundtrack ==
The music of the film was composed by Shankar–Jaikishan and lyrics by Hasrat Jaipuri.

#	Song	Singer
1	"April Fool Banaya, To Unko Gussa Aaya"	Mohammed Rafi
2	"Aa, Gale Lag Jaa, Mere Sapne, Mere Apne"	Mohammed Rafi
3	"Meri Mohabbat, Paak Mohabbat"	Mohammed Rafi
4	"Kehdo Kehdo, Jahan Se Kehdo"	Mohammed Rafi, Suman Kalyanpur
5	"Tujhe Pyar Karte Hain, Karte Rahenge"	Mohammed Rafi, Suman Kalyanpur
6	"Unki Pehli Nazar Kya Asar Kar Gayi"	Lata Mangeshkar
7	"Mera Naam Rita Christina"	Lata Mangeshkar

== See also ==
- List of Bollywood films of 1964
