= Mere Huzoor =

- Theatrical release poster
- Directed by: Vinod Kumar
- Written by: Vinod Kumar
- Produced by: Malik Chand Kochar; Vinod Kumar
- Starring: Raaj Kumar; Mala Sinha; Jeetendra
- Cinematography: Prakash Antra
- Edited by: Prabhakar Supare
- Music by: Shankar–Jaikishan
- Production company: Movie Mughals
- Distributed by: Shemaroo Movies
- Release date: 26 October 1968
- Running time: 165 minutes
- Country: India
- Languages: Hindi, Urdu

Mere Huzoor (transl. My lord) is a 1968 Indian Hindi-language romantic drama film, produced by Malik Chand Kochar and Vinod Kumar under the Movie Mughals banner and directed by Vinod Kumar. The film stars Raaj Kumar, Mala Sinha and Jeetendra, with music composed by Shankar–Jaikishan.

== Plot ==
Akhtar Hussain saves the life of Nawab Salim and earns his gratitude. Salim invites Akhtar to come to his palatial home, and Akhtar does so. On the way in a train journey, he meets beautiful Sultanat and falls in love with her. On arrival at Salim's house, Akhtar is treated with utmost respect, provided employment, and given a place to live. Akhtar meets with Saltanat, and both plan to get married. Unknown to them, Salim also loves Saltanat, but Saltanat rejects his advances, and proposal, leaving him heartbroken. Soon Saltanat and Akhtar get married and settle down. Pyarelal Akhtars friend falls in love with Saltanat's sister Geeta. Saltanat soon gives birth to a son. Salim is very affectionate with this child and the child to grows to like Salim. Akhtar, meanwhile, has fallen in bad company, drinks alcohol, and romances a courtesan named Firdous by the instigation of Nabban Miya(Ram Mohan). When Saltanat finds out about this affair, she is outraged and asks Akhtar to improve, but instead, Akhtar divorces her, leaving her and her child alone, homeless, and with nowhere to turn to. Salim offers to assist her, but Saltanat thinks that Salim is to blame for the current situation, as he may have had a hand in bringing ruin upon herself and Akhtar just to get even for her not marrying him. But soon Saltanat realized that she was wrong. Salim marries Saltanat to save her from people's wrong thinking about her. Meanwhile, Akhtar realizes that he has lost everything as the courtesan rejects him for another man. But it was too late. One day Akhtar comes to Salim's home to see his son for the last time as he is leaving the city and also for pardon from Saltanat. While leaving the house, Salim calls to Akhtar many times, but Akhtar runs away. Running behind Akhtar, Salim suffers a road accident and dies in the arms of Akhtar and Saltanat. After many years, when Saltanat's son is going abroad to be a doctor, all the family visits Salim's grave. Near the grave, there was an old man who used to clean the garbage near the grave for many years. He was none other than Akhtar Hussain...

== Cast ==
- Raaj Kumar as Nawab Salim
- Jeetendra as Akhtar Hussain Akhtar
- Mala Sinha as Sultanat
- Johnny Walker as Pyarelal Bedar
- Zeb Rehman as Geeta (Chunautilal's Daughter)
- Surekha as Shama (Salim's Sister)
- Laxmi Chhaya as Courtesan - in song Jhanak Jhanak Tori Baaje Payaliya
- Madhumati as Courtesan in song Jhanak Jhanak Tori Baaje Payaliya
- Indira as Courtesan Firdous begum
- Khalid Siddiqui as Child Munne, Saltanat and Akhtar's son
- Unknown as Adult Munne, Saltanat and Akhtar's son in the final scene.
- K. N. Singh as Hakim
- David as Lala Chunautilal
- Manorama as Mrs. Chunautilal
- Praveen Paul as Akhtar's mother
- Ram Mohan as Nabban Miya
- Majnu as train co-passenger in the song Rukh se jara naqaab..
- Master Ripple as Munne Miyan

== Soundtrack ==
The film score was by duo Shankar–Jaikishan with lyrics by Hasrat Jaipuri. Classical Raga Darbari Kanada was used for the fast-paced Kathak dance number, "Jhanak Jhanak Tori Baje Payaliya" sung by Manna Dey. Another song "Ghum Uthane Ke Liye Main To Jiye Jaunga," was based on Bhairav (raga) and "Jo Guzar Rahi Hai Mujh Par," was based on Raag Bageshri. Another song, "Rukh Se Zara Naqab Utha Do Mere Huzoor" was set on a train, hence the music directors added train whistle and rhythms of a moving train into the song. The muslim social film set in Lucknow, had the song "Rukh Se Zara Naqab Utha Do Mere Huzoor" sung by Mohammed Rafi and classical-based dance number, "Jhanak Jhanak Tori Baje Payaliya" sung by Manna Dey, which won him the 1968 National Film Award for Best Male Playback Singer.

Song	Singer	Raga
"Allah Allah Allah, Woh Le Gaya Chandi Chhalla"	Lata Mangeshkar	
"Aap Ki Khatir"	Lata Mangeshkar, Mohammed Rafi	
"Meri Jaan, Meri Jaan, Apne Aashiq Ko Satana"	Asha Bhosle, Mohammed Rafi	
"Jo Guzar Rahi Hai Mujh Par"	Mohammed Rafi	
"Rukh Se Zara Naqab Utha Do Mere Huzoor"	Mohammed Rafi	
"Gham Uthane Ke Liye Main To Jiye Jaunga"	Mohammed Rafi	
"Jhanak Jhanak Tori Baaje Payaliya"	Manna Dey	Darbari Kanada
