= Saira Banu =

Indian actress (born 1944)

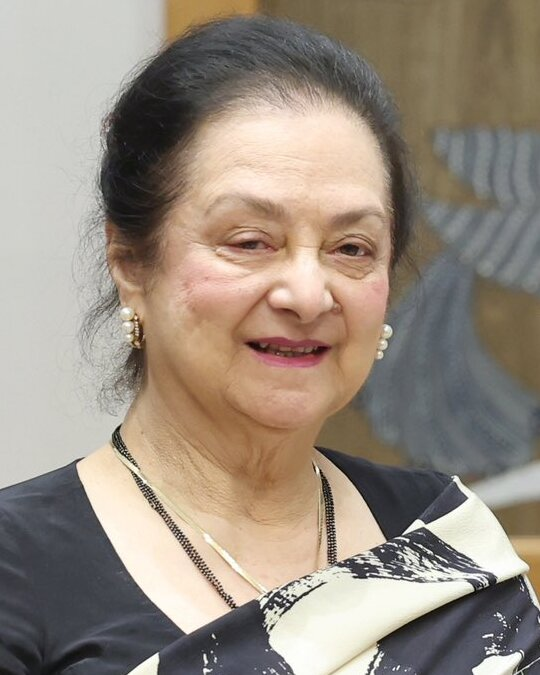
- Saira Banu, c. 2023
- Pronunciation: [sɑːɪɾɑ bɑːnoː]
- Born: 23 August 1944 (age 82); Mussoorie, India
- Occupations: Actress, film producer
- Years active: 1961–1984
- Spouse: Dilip Kumar (m. 1966; died 2021)
- Parents: Mian Ehsan-ul-Haq (father); Naseem Banu (mother)
- Relatives: Chamiyan Bai (grandmother); Khan–Banu family

Saira Banu (Note: Hindustani pronunciation: [sɑːɪɾɑ bɑːnoː].) (Hindustani pronunciation: [sɑːɪɾɑ bɑːnoː]; born 23 August 1944) is an Indian retired actress who mainly worked in Hindi films. Regarded as one of the finest actors of Hindi cinema, she was among the most popular actresses of the 1960s and early 1970s. Banu received four Filmfare Awards nominations throughout her career.

Banu made her acting debut with Junglee (1961), for which she received a Filmfare Award for Best Actress nomination. She received three more Best Actress nominations for Shagird (1967), Diwana (1967) and Sagina (1974). She went onto be part of many successful films such as: Bluffmaster (1963), Ayee Milan Ki Bela (1964), Padosan (1968), Victoria No. 203 (1972), Hera Pheri (1976) and Gopi (1970). Her final film before retirement was Faisla (1988).

She married actor Dilip Kumar in 1966. The couple did not have any children. Banu also worked as a producer for the Bhojpuri film Ab To Banja Sajanwa Hamaar (2006).

== Early life ==
Saira Banu was born on 23 August 1944 in Mussoorie to actress Naseem Banu and producer Mian Ehsan-ul-Haq. She had one brother, Sultan Ahmed who was five years older than her. Banu's niece Shaheen Banu married actor Sumeet Saigal. Her grandniece Sayyeshaa, is also a film actress and is married to film actor Arya.

== Career ==
Banu was 16 years old in 1960 when she started work for her debut in Hindi films. She said in a programme that she had basic talent and little dancing experience. Her peers all were classically trained, which was why she was not put in the top league. Banu started taking Kathak and Bharata Natyam lessons, and trained herself professionally. Soon she became a dancer, and her films featured more of her dancing.

Banu made her acting debut opposite Shammi Kapoor in the 1961 film Junglee, for which she earned her first nomination for the Filmfare Award for Best Actress. Junglee was written by Aghajani Kashmeri (aka Kashmiri and Agha Jani), who also coached her in Urdu dialogue delivery, given his background in Urdu literature and poetry from Lucknow. She created her image as a romantic heroine as she has acted in many romantic films.

She did another film opposite Shammi Kapoor, Bluff Master, directed by Manmohan Desai. Banu worked with other popular actors of the 1960s and established herself as a successful actress with Jhuk Gaya Aasman (1968) and Ayee Milan Ki Bela (1964) both opposite Rajendra Kumar, April Fool (1964) opposite Biswajit Chatterjee, Aao Pyaar Karen (1964), and Shagird (1967) both opposite Joy Mukherjee and Pyar Mohabbat opposite Dev Anand (1966).

The 1967 film Aman, opposite Rajendra Kumar, was her first release after marriage. She acted in three films with Manoj Kumar, Shaadi, Purab Aur Paschim and Balidaan. The cult comedy film Padosan (1968) opposite Sunil Dutt catapulted her to the top league. The female-oriented Victoria No. 203 with Navin Nischol is her biggest hit. In early 1970s, she acted in three films with her husband: Gopi, Sagina and Bairaag. Only Gopi was successful at the box office. She acted in six films with Dharmendra: Jwar Bhata, Aadmi Aur Insaan, Resham Ki Dori, Pocket Maar, International Crook and Chaitali out of which 5 were hits. In an interview, she said that she regretted missing the chance to work with Rajesh Khanna. She quoted: "I was supposed to work with him in Chhoti Bahu (1971), but I could not because I was ill. I shot with him for two days and found that he was very charming, humble, and a shy person." She was paired with Vinod Khanna in Aarop and Amitabh Bachchan in Zameer and Hera Pheri. In 1976, she starred in Nehle Pe Dehla with Sunil Dutt which turned out to be her last successful film. Afterwards, her other films were not doing well at the box office. Later, she discontinued her acting career.

She has earned three Filmfare nominations for Best Actress: Shagird (1967), Diwana (1968), and Sagina (1974). Despite Banu's success, several critics bemoaned that she made it on glamour and not on talent. In response to the criticism, she stated in a 1973 interview:

Maybe they (critics) are right—but what matters is that I am around, whether they like it or not. Remember, the same was said for the great star Madhubala, comparing her to Marilyn Monroe, and I am happy to be in such illustrious company!

Banu appeared in a cameo opposite her husband in Duniya (1984), wherein the song "Teri Meri Zindagi" became very popular. Her delayed film Faisla was eventually released in 1988 which marked her last film appearance.

== Personal life ==
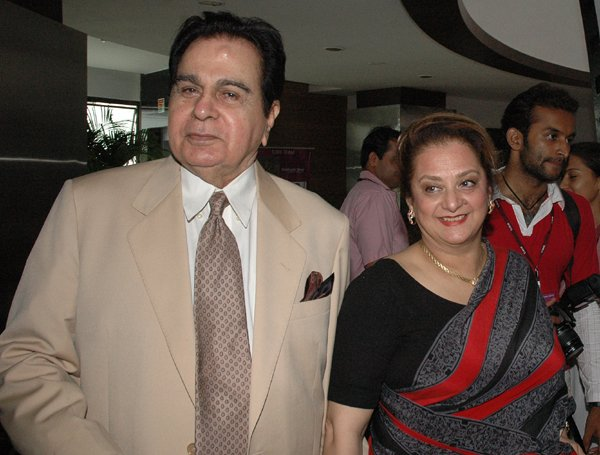
Banu with husband Dilip Kumar

Banu married actor Dilip Kumar on 11 October 1966. Banu, 22, and Kumar, 44 years old, at the time of their marriage lived in Bandra. They did not have any children. In his autobiography, Dilip Kumar: The Substance and the Shadow, he revealed that Banu had conceived in 1972, but developed complications that led to a miscarriage. Following this, they did not try to have children again, believing it to be God's will.

== Legacy ==
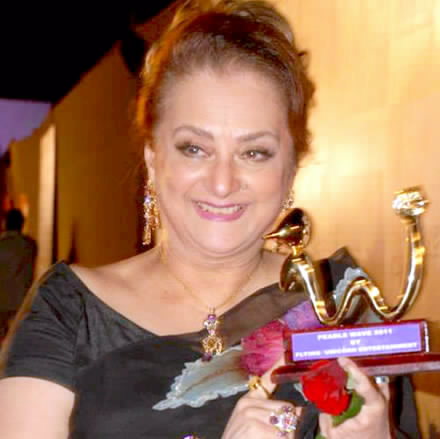
Saira Banu at an event

Saira Banu is regarded as one of the beautiful actresses of Hindi cinema. In 2022, she was placed in Outlook India's "75 Best Bollywood Actresses" list. Banu was placed 9th in Rediff.com's "Best Bollywood Debut Ever" list, for Junglee. She was also placed in Times of India's "50 Beautiful Faces" list. Dinesh Raheja of Rediff.com noted, "Saira Banu is a fey beauty, as delicate as filigreed lace. But the painted talons she flashed on screen were also a symbol of her tenacity and spirit." India TV termed her a "terrific actress" and stated, "Three words that best describe legendary actress Saira Banu are elegance, divine and gorgeous."

== Filmography ==
Year	Title	Role	Notes
1961	Junglee	Rajkumari	
1962	Shaadi	Gauri	
1963	Bluffmaster	Seema	
1964	Ayee Milan Ki Bela	Barkha	
1964	April Fool	Rita Christiana	
1964	Aao Pyaar Karen	Shalini	
1964	Door Ki Awaz	Bela / Jyoti	
1966	Saaz Aur Awaaz	Geeta	
1966	Yeh Zindagi Kitni Haseen Hai	Princess Sarita / Sarita	Double Role
1966	Pyar Mohabbat	Rita Singh	
1967	Shagird	Poonam	
1967	Aman	Meloda	
1968	Padosan	Bindu	
1968	Jhuk Gaya Aasmaan	Priya Khanna	
1968	Diwana	Kamini Gupta	
1969	Aadmi Aur Insaan	Meena Khanna	
1970	Gopi	Seema	
1970	Purab Aur Paschim	Preeti	
1970	Sagina Mahato	Lalita	Bengali Film
1971	Balidaan	Sheela	
1972	Victoria No. 203	Rekha	
1973	Jwar Bhata	Gayatri	
1973	Daaman Aur Aag	Rita	
1974	Resham Ki Dori	Anupama	
1974	International Crook	Seema	
1974	Sagina	Lalita	
1974	Pocketmaar	Asha Rai	
1974	Aarop	Aruna	
1974	Paise Ki Gudiya	Madhavi	
1975	Saazish	Sunita	
1975	Zameer	Sunita	
1975	Chaitali	Chaitali	
1975	Aakhri Daao	Reena	
1975	Mounto	Meena	
1976	Aarambh	Parvati	
1976	Bairaag	Tara	
1976	Hera Pheri	Kiran Singh	
1976	Koi Jeeta Koi Haara	Tulsi	
1976	Nehle Peh Dehlaa	Beena	
1977	Mera Vachan Geeta Ki Qasam	Champa	
1978	Kaala Aadmi	Sheetal	
1980	Desh Drohi	Prerna	
1980	Lahu Pukarega	Sarla	
1984	Duniya	Sumitra Kumar	Guest Appearance
1988	Faisla	Radha	Delayed release

== Awards and nominations ==
Year	Award	Category	Film	Result	Ref.
1962	Filmfare Awards	Best Actress	Junglee	Nominated	
1968	Filmfare Awards	Best Actress	Shagird	Nominated	
1969	Filmfare Awards	Best Actress	Diwana	Nominated	
1975	Filmfare Awards	Best Actress	Sagina	Nominated	
2017	Raj Kapoor Awards	Raj Kapoor Lifetime Achievement	Contribution in the field of Arts	Won	
