= Kahin Aur Chal =

- Poster
- Directed by: Vijay Anand
- Written by: Vijay Anand
- Produced by: Jal Mistry
- Starring: Dev Anand; Asha Parekh
- Music by: Shankar–Jaikishan
- Release date: 1968
- Country: India
- Language: Hindi

Kahin Aur Chal (English: "Let's Go Elsewhere") is a Hindi film that was released in 1968. It was written and directed by Vijay Anand and stars his older brother Dev Anand. Asha Parekh is the heroine. Shubha Khote, Madan Puri are part of the supporting cast. Shankar Jaikishan composed the music. Mohammed Rafi, Lata Mangeshkar and Asha Bhosle are the playback singers. It was produced by Jal Mistry, who was also the cinematographer.

== Plot ==
It is a thriller in which the hero is suspected of a crime and is on the run. Shail (Dev Anand) works as an engine driver, and he is devastated when he finds his wife Leela (Padma Chavan) having an affair with his friend Paul (Madan Puri). He shoots Paul and then runs away. Feeling guilty, he jumps into the water to kill himself. Rajni (Asha Parekh) finds him in the water and saves him. She nurses him back to health and they fall in love. However, Shail cannot forget his past. It turns out that Paul has survived, and he and Leela are spending Shail's money. Shail decides to take revenge with Rajni's help. A motif that happens throughout the film is that Rajni looks forward to the time when Shail's train reaches the station for two minutes, every day.

== Cast ==
- Dev Anand- Shail
- Asha Parekh- Rajni
- Madan Puri- Paul

== Music ==
1. "O Laxmi O Sarsu, O Sheela, O Rajni Dekho Kya Kya Lekar Aaya" - Mohammed Rafi
2. "Dubate Huye Dil Ko Tinake Kaa Sahaaraa Bhi Nahin" - Mohammed Rafi
3. "Zindagi Seharaa Bhi Hai Aur Zindagi Gulashan Bhi Hai" - Lata Mangeshkar
4. "Re Aane Wale Aa" - Lata Mangeshkar
5. "Shokh Ankhe Dekh Kar Surat Per Pyar Aa Hi Gaya" - Mohammed Rafi, Asha Bhosle
6. "Pani Pe Barse Jab Pani" - Lata Mangeshkar

== Production ==
According to filmmaker Vijay Anand's biography "Ek Hota Goldie", written by Anita Padhye, the film had a long troubled production. The film's financier Tolaram Jalan signed the biggest names of the 1960s Hindi cinema (Dev Anand, Asha Parekh, Shankar-Jaikishen, Vijay Anand). Filming began in 1963. Anand felt he was making a good film, but it ran into financial problems. Jalan stopped paying cast and crew and took the film from Anand, because he wanted a flop film to adjust his income taxes. It was eventually released in a single theater in 1968 and then quickly pulled from circulation. It hasn't been released on DVD or is on any streaming platform. However, the songs are available online.

== Reception ==
Leading lady Asha Parekh wrote in her 2017 memoir The Hit Girl: "The project ran into financial problems, the end-result suffered, and did not fare well at the box office."

== Trivia ==
Asha Parekh wrote in her memoir that she found the song "Zindagi Sehra Bhi Hai" to be melodious, which she often listens to online.
