= Aas Ka Panchhi =

1961 film

- Poster
- Directed by: Mohan Kumar
- Written by: Mohan Kumar; Rajinder Singh Bedi
- Produced by: J. Om Prakash
- Starring: Rajendra Kumar; Vyjayanthimala
- Cinematography: V. Babasaheb
- Edited by: Pratap Dave
- Music by: Shankar Jaikishan
- Production company: Filmyug
- Release date: 1961
- Country: India
- Language: Hindi

Aas Ka Panchhi is a 1961 Hindi movie produced by J. Om Prakash. It was written by Mohan Kumar and Rajinder Singh Bedi and directed by Mohan Kumar.

The film stars Rajendra Kumar, Vyjayanthimala and Leela Chitnis. The film's music was by Shankar Jaikishan.

== Story ==
Rajan Khanna lives in a family of four including his father, mother, and younger sister. He is involved with his college mate Neena Bakshi. After graduation, he wants to join the military, but his father wants him to join the same office where he worked for many years. In the heat of the argument, his father gets a heart attack and to make him happy Rajan joins the office. After a while, his father passes away and Rajan joins the army. Later, when he returns, nothing is the same anymore. Neena is engaged to doctor Ramesh. To avoid his misery, Rajan goes back to the military base and takes up a mission to rescue a senior officer Major Bakshi. He is behind enemy lines. Will he return alive? Will he get his love back??

== Cast ==
- Vyjayanthimala as Neena Bakshi
- Rajendra Kumar as Rajan 'Raju' Khanna
- Raj Mehra as Major Surendra Bakshi
- Sunder as Mangal
- Nazir Hussain as Nihalchand Khanna
- Shaminder as Ramesh
- Mumtaz Begum as Mrs. Girdhari
- Shivraj as Girdhari
- Leela Chitnis as Mrs. Nihalchand Khanna
- Brahm Bhardwaj as Army Officer

== Soundtrack ==
#	Title	Singer(s)
1	"Tum Roothi Raho"	Mukesh, Lata Mangeshkar
2	"Ae Dil Pyar Ki Manzil"	Mukesh
3	"Haye Meri Uljhi Nazar"	Lata Mangeshkar
4	"Dheere Chalo Zara"	Subir Sen, Lata Mangeshkar
5	"Dil Mera Ek Aas Ka Panchhi"	Subir Sen
6	"Ab Char Dinon Ki Chhutti Hai"	Mohammed Rafi
7	"Apni Bhi Kya Zindagi Hai"	Mukesh
8	"Title Music (Instrumental)"	
