= Daaman Aur Aag =

- Directed by: Vinod Kumar
- Starring: Sanjay Khan; Saira Banu; Balraj Sahni; Madan Puri; K. N. Singh
- Music by: Shankar–Jaikishan
- Release date: 8 January 1973
- Country: India
- Language: Hindi

Daaman Aur Aag is a 1973 Bollywood drama film. The film stars Sanjay Khan and Saira Banu.

== Plot ==
Unable to fulfill the necessity for his only son due to his extreme poverty, Shankar, along with his friends Pinto and Abdul start selling liquor and send his son abroad for higher education. What will happen when his son Raja will return from abroad and will know about this truth?

== Cast ==
- Sanjay Khan as Raja
- Saira Banu as Rita
- Balraj Sahni as Shanker
- Anwar Hussain as Pintoo
- Rajendranath Malhotra as Butaram
- Indrani Mukherjee as Soni
- Mukri as Abdul
- Praveen Paul as Totaram's wife
- Madan Puri as Surajmal
- Zeb Rehman as Ganga
- K.N. Singh as Mr. Singh
- Sunder as Totaram

== Soundtrack ==
Song	Singer
"Dil Ke Tukde, Sun Le Kahani"	Manna Dey
"Pyar Ki Bandhan Mein"	Lata Mangeshkar
"Thirka Badan To Geeton Ke Dhaare"	Lata Mangeshkar, Asha Bhonsle
"Muskurati Huyi Ek Husn Ki Tasveer Ho Tum"	Mohammed Rafi, Asha Bhonsle
