= Saazish (1975 film) =

- Directed by: Kalidas J
- Written by: Ranjan Bose
- Screenplay by: Ramesh Pant
- Produced by: Kalidas
- Starring: Dharmendra; Saira Banu
- Edited by: Waman Bhosle, Guru Dutt
- Music by: Shankar Jaikishan
- Distributed by: Maya Movietone
- Release date: 14 February 1975
- Running time: 132 minutes
- Country: India
- Language: Hindi

Saazish is a 1975 Hindi-language action film directed by Kalidas.

== Plot ==
Jaideep who is a car racer and Sunita who has won the Miss Cosmos beauty contest in the USA. They fall in love and go on a world tour when they unknowingly get involved in a conspiracy that shakes their faith in each other.

Mr. Wong the villain wants to kill Sunita as she has discovered a secret which if given to Interpol will proven dangerous for Wong's gold smuggling business. Jaideep who is an undercover agent boards the ship on which the gold is being smuggled to break the syndicate and save Sunita.

== Cast ==
- Dharmendra as Jaideep
- Saira Banu as Sunita
- David as Captain Thompson
- Rajendra Nath as Peter Kumar
- Madan Puri as Wong
- Iftekhar as Interpol Officer
- Helen as Lola, Singer/Dancer on ship
- Brahm Bhardwaj as Jaideep's boss
- Dev Kumar as Hunsui/I.Y. Natrajan /Boss
- Murad as uncle
- Paintal as Pinto
- Jagdish Raj as doctor

== Soundtrack ==
Lyrics: Hasrat Jaipuri

- "Na Takht Chaahiye Na Taaj Chaahiye" - Asha Bhosle
- "Na Takht Chhaahiye" v2 - Asha Bhosle
- "How Sweet Daadaaji Aise Na" - Asha Bhosle, Ranu Mukhrjee
- "Hum Toh Lenge Sab Ki Balaayen" - Mahendra Kapoor
- "Woh Bade Khush Naseeb Hote Hain" - Suman Kalyanpur, Mahendra Kapoor
- "Tujhe Humne Chaha Apna Samajh Kar" - Saira Banu, Mahendra Kapoor
- "Hai Phir Zara Zara Koi Teer Sa Chubha" - Sharda
