= Shagird (1967 film) =

- Poster
- Directed by: Samir Ganguly
- Written by: Gulzar; Subodh Mukherjee; Nirmal Dey; Vishwamitter Adil
- Produced by: Subodh Mukherjee
- Starring: Joy Mukherjee; Saira Banu
- Cinematography: N. V. Srinivas
- Edited by: V. K. Naik
- Music by: Laxmikant–Pyarelal
- Production company: Subodh Mukherji Productions
- Release date: 1967
- Country: India
- Language: Hindi

Shagird (transl. Disciple) is a 1967 Indian Hindi-language comedy Drama Film directed by Samir Ganguly. The film stars Joy Mukherjee and Saira Banu in lead roles.

== Plot ==
The movie begins with Ramesh (Joy Mukherjee) attending a party on a ship. There, a wealthy girl named Shefali (Urvashi Dutta) professes her love for him, and upon his rejection, she encounters a man named Mr. Madan Chicago wala (Madan Puri) who is a man of dirty character. But she rejects his advances. Professor Brij Mohan Agnihotri (I. S. Johar) is a confirmed bachelor, and he firmly refuses to get married. Ramesh is his student, who considers him his mentor. On a visit to his friend out of town, Brij meets his friend's beautiful daughter, Poonam (Saira Banu), and falls in love with her. Throwing all caution to the winds, he changes his appearance, and attempts to conquer Poonam, but he later finds that Poonam is attracted to his student, Ramesh, who met her on an important workplace. The professor decides to reverse his and his students' roles and made him his temporary mentor. He gets lessons from Ramesh and learns to impress Poonam, but she only considers the professor as her uncle. Meanwhile, Poonam and Ramesh fall in love with each other and Ramesh introduces her to his mother (Achala Sachdev) and his business prone father (Nazir Hussain) and both of them accept her. Later, Madan makes a jealous Shefali pregnant and frames Ramesh for this deed. In order to save a woman in distress and to protect his father's honour, Ramesh cancels his marriage with Poonam, much to the shock of his parents. On her wedding day with Ramesh, Shefali gets a call from Madan, threatening to tell Ramesh the truth if she refused to come to his house on last time. Shefali, determined to kill Madan, sets out for his house, with Poonam on her trail. Poonam finds out Madan's secret when he shoots Shefali. Madan follows Poonam till the terrace and is about to push her down, when Ramesh comes to save her. After a bloody fight, Madan gets killed and Ramesh gets his beloved Poonam and his whole family back.

== Cast ==
- Joy Mukerjee as Ramesh
- Saira Banu as Poonam
- I. S. Johar as Prof. Brij Mohan Agnihotri/Birju
- Nazir Hussain as Ramesh's Father
- Achala Sachdev as Ramesh's Mother
- Madan Puri as Madan Chicagowala
- Asit Sen as Narayan
- A. K. Hangal as Kedarnath Badri Narayan
- Shetty as Ruffian
- Mac Mohan as Ramesh's Friend at an Engagement party
- Shivraj as Annoyed Husband
- Bhola as Waiter
- Urvashi Dutta as Shefali
- O.P. Goyle as Goyle

== Award ==
- Nominated, Filmfare Best Actress Award - Saira Banu

== Music ==
Shagird

Soundtrack album by Laxmikant–Pyarelal
- Released: 1967
- Genre: Feature film soundtrack
- Label: Saregama
- Producer: Laxmikant–Pyarelal

The soundtrack of the film contains 6 songs. The music is composed by Laxmikant–Pyarelal, with lyrics authored by Majrooh Sultanpuri.

- Song "Dil Wil Pyar Wyar" topped the Binaca Geetmala 1968 annual list.

All lyrics are written by Majrooh Sultanpuri; all music is composed by Laxmikant–Pyarelal.

No.	Title	Singer(s)	Length
1.	"Bade Miya Diwane"	Mohammed Rafi, Manna Dey
2.	"Dil Wil Pyar Wyar"	Mohammed Rafi, Lata Mangeshkar
3.	"Kanha Kanha Aan Padi" (Raga Manj Khamaj)	Lata Mangeshkar
4.	"Woh Hain Zara Khafa Khafa"	Mohammed Rafi, Lata Mangeshkar
5.	"Ruk Jaa Aye Hawa, Tham Jaa Aye Bahaar"	Lata Mangeshkar
6.	"Duniya Paagal Hai, Ya Phir Main Deewana"	Mohammad Rafi
