= Around the World (1967 film) =

- Directed by: Pachhi (was brother of Om Prakash in real life)
- Written by: Jagdish Kanwal (dialogue); Pachhi (screenplay)
- Produced by: Pachhi
- Starring: Raj Kapoor; Rajshree; Pran; Om Prakash
- Cinematography: G. Singh
- Edited by: Shyam Rajput
- Music by: Shankar Jaikishan
- Release date: 1967
- Running time: 178 minutes
- Country: India
- Language: Hindi

Around the World is a 1967 Indian Hindi-language romantic comedy film written and directed by Pachhi. It stars Raj Kapoor as an Indian who travels around the world with five thousand rupees. The film also starred Rajshree, Ameeta, Om Prakash, and Mehmood. It was India's first film to be released in 70 mm format and was shot all around the world.

== Plot ==
Raj Singh (Raj Kapoor) is the nephew and prospective heir of wealthy businessman J. J. Singh (Raj Mehra). While travelling abroad on business, his uncle arranges for Raj to join him in Tokyo. However, Pran (Pran), an employee responsible for Raj's travel arrangements, deliberately interferes with his plans.

When Raj arrives in Japan, he discovers that his uncle has already departed for Europe following a change in his itinerary. Unable to afford another flight and left with only eight US dollars, Raj finds himself stranded in Tokyo.

Seeking a way to continue his journey, Raj obtains work aboard a cruise ship, where he meets Rita (Rajshree). Their encounter leads to a romantic relationship as Raj attempts to reunite with his uncle and continue his travels.

== Cast ==
- Raj Kapoor as Raj Singh
- Rajshree as Rita
- Pran as Pran
- Om Prakash
- Mehmood Ali as Albata
- Sir Frank Worrell West Indies Test Cricketer Special Appearance

== Soundtrack ==
#	Song	Singer
1	"Joshe Jawani Haay Re Haay"	Mukesh
2	"Dil Lagakar Aap Se"	Mukesh
3	"Duniya Ki Sair Kar Lo"	Mukesh, Sharda
4	"Chale Jana Zara Thehro" (Duet)	Mukesh, Sharda
5	"Chale Jana Zara Thehro" (Solo)	Sharda
6	"Jaane Bhi De Sanam"	Sharda
7	"Yeh Munh Aur Masoor Ki Dal"	Mubarak Begum, Sharda
8	"Kauwa Chala Hans Ki Chaal"	Mohammed Rafi
9	"Aao Aao Aate Kyon Nahin"	Mohammed Rafi, Manna Dey

== Reception ==
In 1977, Kapoor told to India Today that he dislikes the film, he also criticised Pachchi's direction, and that he acted in the film for money, because "like Orson Welles, I had to act in bad films to make good ones myself".
