= Lalita Pawar =

Indian actress (1916–1998)

- Born: Amba Laxman Rao Sagun; 18 April 1916; Yeola, Nashik, Bombay Presidency, British India
- Died: 24 February 1998 (aged 81); Pune, Maharashtra, India
- Children: 1
- Awards: 1960: Filmfare Award for Best Supporting Actress – Anari; 1961: Sangeet Natak Akademi Award – Acting

Lalita Pawar (née Amba Laxmanrao Shagun; 18 April 1916 – 24 February 1998) was a prolific Indian actress, who later became famous as a character actress, appearing in over 700 films in Hindi, Marathi and Gujarati cinema. She holds a Guinness world record of longest acting career spanning over 70 years. Pawar won the Filmfare Award for Best Supporting Actress for her performance in the comedy-drama Anari. She featured in hit films such as Netaji Palkar (1938), made by Bhalji Pendharkar, New Hana Pictures' Sant Damaji, Navyug Chitrapat's Amrit, written by VS Khandekar, and Chhaya Films' Gora Kumbhar. Her other memorable roles were in the films Anari (1959), Shri 420 and Mr & Mrs 55, and the role of Manthara, in Ramanand Sagar's television epic serial Ramayan.

== Early life ==
Pawar was born as Amba Laxman Rao Sagun on 18 April 1916, into an orthodox family in Yeola in Nashik. Her father Laxman Rao Shagun was a rich silk and cotton piecegoods merchant. She started her acting career at age nine in the film Raja Harishchandra (1928), and later went on to play lead roles in the silent era and 1940s films, in a career spanning seven decades, until the end of her life.

She co-produced and acted in a silent film Kailash (1932), and later produced another film Duniya Kya Hai (1938), a talkie.

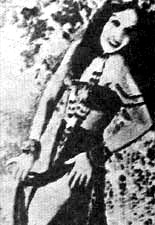
Lalita Pawar, playing the lead in film, Himmat-e-Marda (1935)

In 1942, as a part of a scene in the movie Jung-e-Azadi, actor Master Bhagwan was to slap her hard. Being a new actor, he accidentally slapped her very hard, which resulted in facial paralysis and a burst left eye vein. Three years of treatment later, she was left with a defective left eye; thus she had to abandon lead roles, and switch to character roles, which won her much of her fame later in life. She also played the leading lady with the top heroes of the era like Paidi Jairaj, Trilok Kapoor, Gajanan Jagirdar etc.

She was known particularly for playing maternal figures, especially wicked matriarchs or mothers-in-law. She also notably played the strict but kind Mrs. L. D'Sa in Anari (1959) with Raj Kapoor. Under Hrishikesh Mukherjee's direction, she gave the performance of a lifetime, for which she received the Filmfare Best Supporting Actress Award. Also, as the tough matriarch who falls in love in Professor (1962), and the devious hunchback Manthara in Ramanand Sagar's television series Ramayan. She was honored by the Government of India as the first lady of Indian cinema in 1961.

== Personal life ==
Her first marriage was to Ganpatrao Pawar, which ended after he slept with her younger sister. She later married film producer Rajprakash Gupta, of Ambika studios, Bombay. Her son Jai Pawar became a producer and worked with her in movies like Manzil. Jai Pawar had 2 sons Sanjay Pawar and Manoj Pawar. She and her husband lived in Juhu, Mumbai with her grandson Sanjay Pawar and great-granddaughters Anushka and Aanya Pawar. She died on 24 February 1998 in Aundh, Pune, where she had been staying for a while, due to mouth cancer.

== Selected filmography ==
Year	Film	Character	Notes
1941	Amrit	Seeta	
1944	Ram Shastri	Anandibai (wife of Peshwa Raghunathrao)	
1950	Dahej	Mrs. Biharilal (Suraj's mother)	
1951	The Immortal Song	Vitabai	
1952	Daag	Shankar (Dilip Kumar)'s mother	
1952	Parchhain	Badi Rani	
1955	Shri 420	Ganga Mai	
1955	Mr & Mrs 55	Seeta Devi, Anita's aunt	
1957	Nau Do Gyarah		
1958	Parvarish	Thakurain Rukmani Singh	Nominated – Filmfare Award for Best Supporting Actress
1959	Anari	Mrs. L. D'Sa	Won – Filmfare Award for Best Supporting Actress
1959	Sujata	Giribala, Buaji/aunt	
1960	Jhumroo	Jhumroo's Mother Jis desh me ganga behti hai (1960)	
1960	Aanchal	Ramu's mother	Nominated – Filmfare Award for Best Supporting Actress
1961	Junglee	Shekhar's mother	
1961	Hum Dono	Major's Mother	
1961	Sampoorna Ramayana	Manthara	
1961	Memdidi		
1962	Professor	Sita Devi Verma	Nominated – Filmfare Award for Best Supporting Actress
1962	Banarsi Thug		
1963	Bluff Master		
1963	Sehra	Angara's mother	
1963	Grahasti	Harish Khanna's sister	
1963	Ghar Basake Dekho	Mrs. Shanta Mehra	
1964	Sharabi		
1964	Kohra	Dai Maa	Nominated – Filmfare Award for Best Supporting Actress
1966	Phool Aur Patthar	Mrs. Jeevan Ram	
1966	Love in Tokyo	Gayatri Devi	
1966	Khandan	Fufi	
1967	Boond Jo Ban Gayee Moti	Shefali's mother	
1967	Noor Jehan		
1968	Ankhen	Madam/Fake Aunt	
1968	Neel Kamal	Thakurain	
1968	Aabroo	Mrs. Verma	
1968	Teen Bahuraniyan	Sita's mother	
1969	Meri Bhabhi	Gangajali	
1970	Anand	Matron	
1970	Pushpanjali	Rani Sahiba	
1970	Gopi	Lilawati devi	
1970	Darpan	Dadima	
1971	Jwala		
1972	Gaon Hamara Shaher Tumhara	Lajwanti Pandey	
1972	Bombay to Goa	Kashibai	
1974	Hamrahi		
1974	Naya Din Nai Raat	Mental Hospital Patient (Special appearance)	
1974	Doosri Sita		
1976	Aaj Ka Ye Ghar	Mrs. Shanti Dinanath	
1976	Tapasya	Mrs. Varma	
1977	Jay Vejay	Nandini	
1977	Prayashchit		
1977	Aaina	Janki	
1979	Manzil	Mrs. Chandra (Ajay's mother)	
1980	Yaarana	mother	
1980	Kali Ghata	Ambu, House keeper	
1980	Phir Wohi Raat	Hostel Warden	
1980	Sau Din Saas Ke	Bhavani Devi (Prakash's mother)	
1981	Naseeb	Mrs. Gomes	
1981	Sannata	Ms. Rosie	
1982	Apna Bana Lo	Mausi	
1983	Ek Din Bahu Ka	Kalavati	
1986	Pyar Ke Do Pal		
1986	Ghar Sansar	Satyanarayan's mother	
1987	Watan Ke Rakhwale	Radha's Maternal Grandma	
1987	Uttar Dakshin		
1988	Zalzala	Shila's mom	
1988	Sherni	Old lady searching for her son	
1988	Pyasi Aatma		
1989	Bahurani		
1992	Muskurahat	Laundry lady	
1997	Bhai		

=== Television ===
Year	Show	Role	Channel	References
1987	Ramayan	Manthara	DD National	

== Awards ==
- 1960: Filmfare Award for Best Supporting Actress – Anari
- 1961: Sangeet Natak Akademi Award – Acting
- 1996: V. Shantaram Lifetime Achievement Award
