= List of Hindi films of 1963 =

A list of films produced by the Bollywood film industry based in Mumbai in 1963:

== Highest-grossing films ==
The ten highest-grossing films at the Indian box office in 1963:

Rank	Title	Gross collection
1	Mere Mehboob	₹6 crore
2	Taj Mahal	₹3.5 crore
3	Phir Wohi Dil Laya Hoon	₹3 crore
4	Gumrah	₹2.5 crore
5	Dil Ek Mandir	₹2.2 crore
6	Tere Ghar Ke Samne	₹2 crore
7	Shikari	₹1.8 crore
8	Mujhe Jeene Do	₹1.6 crore
9	Gehra Daag	₹1.4 crore
10	Bandini	₹1.3 crore

== A-B ==
Title	Director	Cast	Genre	Notes
Aaj Aur Kal	Vasant Joglekar	Sunil Dutt, Nanda, Ashok Kumar, Raaj Kumar, Tanuja, Soodesh Kumar, Deven Verma	Family Drama	Music: Ravi; Lyrics: Sahir Ludhianvi
Akela	Jay Bee	Balraj Sahni, Sadhana Roychowdhury, Lalita Pawar, Sulochana, Dhumal, Murad, Daisy Irani, Honey Irani	Crime Drama	Music: Datta Naik; Lyrics: Rajendra Krishan
Akeli Mat Jaiyo	Nandlal Jashwantlal	Meena Kumari, Rajendra Kumar, Agha, Minu Mumtaz, Leela Mishra	Romance Drama	Music: Madan Mohan; Lyrics: Majrooh Sultanpuri
Awara Abdulla	Tara Harish	Dara Singh, Parveen Choudhary, Helen, Chandrashekhar, Bhagwan	Action	Music: Datta Naik; Lyrics: Asad Bhopali
Bachpan	Nazar	Salim Khan, Menka Irani, Daisy Irani, Jeevan, Manorama, David, Bhudo Advani	Social Drama	Music: Sardar Malik; Lyrics: Hasrat Jaipuri
Bahurani	T. Prakash Rao	Guru Dutt, Mala Sinha, Feroz Khan, Shyama, Lalita Pawar, Agha	Family Drama	Music: C. Ramchandra; Lyrics: Sahir Ludhianvi
Band Master	Ravindra Dave	Jagdeep, Azra, Ravikant, Lalita Pawar, Rajan	Drama Family Romance	Music: Chitragupta; Lyrics: Prem Dhawan
Bandini	Bimal Roy	Dharmendra, Nutan, Ashok Kumar, Raja Paranjpe, Tarun Bose, Asit Sen, Sulochana	Drama	Won National Film Award for Best Feature Film in Hindi and six Filmfare Awards. Music: S. D. Burman; Lyrics: Shailendra
Been Ka Jadoo	N. Rajesh	Mahipal, Helen, Kammo, Tiwari, Mohan Choti, Ulhas	Fantasy	Music: S. N. Tripathi; Lyrics: B. D. Mishra
Begaana	Sadashiv Rao Kavi	Dharmendra, Supriya Chowdhury, Agha, Sailesh Kumar, Tarun Bose, Madhavi, Daisy Irani, Manorama	Romance Drama	Music: Sapan Jagmohan; Lyrics: Shailendra
Bharosa	K. Shankar	Guru Dutt, Asha Parekh, Sudesh Kumar, Om Prakash, Shobha Khote, Mehmood, Lalita Pawar, Nana Palsikar, Sulochana	Family Drama Romance	Music: Ravi; Lyrics: Rajendra Krishan
Bhootnath	Nanabhai Bhatt	Ranjan, Vijaya Chaudhary, Rajan Haksar, Mohan Choti, Ulhas, Jeevankala	Costume, Action	Music: Ved Pal; Lyrics: Keshav Trivedi, Anjaan, Yusuf
Bin Badal Barsaat	Jyoti Swaroop	Biswajeet, Asha Parekh, Nishi, Mehmood, Moni Chatterjee, Padma Chavan	Thriller Drama	Music: Hemant Kumar; Lyrics: Shakeel Badayuni
Bluff Master	Manmohan Desai	Shammi Kapoor, Saira Banu, Pran, Lalita Pawar, Mohan Choti, Tun Tun, Niranjan Sharma, Rashid Khan	Romance Comedy Drama	Music: Kalayanji Anandji; Lyrics: Rajendra Krishan

== C-F ==
Title	Director	Cast	Genre	Notes
Captain Sheroo	Dharam Kumar	P. Jairaj, Helen, Maruti, Niranjanjan Sharma, Tun Tun, Padma Rani	Action	Music: S. Mohinder; Lyrics: Naqsh Lyallpuri, Raja Mehdi Ali Khan
Chandrasekhar Azad	Jagdish Gautam	P. Jairaj, Nirupa Roy, Indira Billi, Manju, Leela Mishra	Historical Biopic	Music: Sardul Kwatra; Lyrics: Prem Dhawan
Cobra Girl	Nanabhai Bhatt	Mahipal, Ragini, Tiwari, Sunder, Manorama, Mariya	Fantasy	Music: S. N. Tripathi; Lyrics: Prem Dhawan
Commercial Pilot Officer	O. P. Dutta	Sohan Kapila, Shyama, Shashikala	Action Thriller	Music: Roshan; Lyrics: Anand Bakshi
Daanveer Karan	B. R. Panthulu	Shivaji Ganesan, N. T. Rama Rao, Savitri	Mythology	Music: K. Balakrishna; Lyrics: Prem Dhawan
Deepak	Harsukh Bhatt	Sulochana Chatterjee, Master Anwar, Maruti Rao, Chaman Puri, Bhartendu, Dwarkadas	Children	Children's Film Society. Music: Snehal Bhatkar; Lyrics: Moosa Kaleem
Dekha Pyar Tumhara	Kalpataru	Bhagwan, Naaz, Subiraj, Achala Sachdev, Helen, Madan Puri	Romantic Drama	Music: Raj Ratan; Lyrics: Majrooh Sultanpuri
Dev Kanya	S. N. Tripathi	Mahipal, Anita Guha, Krishna Kumari, Mukri, B. M. Vyas, Babu Raje	Fantasy	Music: S. N. Tripathi; Lyrics: B. D. Mishra
Dil Ek Mandir	C. V. Sridhar	Rajendra Kumar, Meena Kumari, Raaj Kumar, Mehmood, Shobha Khote, Achala Sachdev	Romantic triangle	Music: Shankar Jaikishan; Lyrics: Hasrat Jaipuri, Shailendra
Dil Hi To Hai (1963 film)	C. L. Rawal, Pyare Lal Santoshi	Raj Kapoor, Nutan, Pran, Nazir Hussain, Leela Chitnis, Sabita Chatterjee, Manorama, Agha	Romance	Music: Roshan; Lyrics: Sahir Ludhianvi
Ek Dil Sau Afsane	R.C. Talwar	Raj Kapoor, Waheeda Rehman, Lalita Pawar, Sadhna Choudhary, Sulochana, Raj Kishore, Jagdish Raj, Tun Tun	Family, Romance Drama	Music: Shankar Jaikishan; Lyrics: Hasrat Jaipuri, Shailendra
Ek Raaz	Shakti Samanta	Kishore Kumar, Jamuna, Pran, Lalita Pawar, Tun Tun, Mumtaz, Agha	Social Family Drama	Music: Chitragupta; Lyrics: Majrooh Sultanpuri
Ek Tha Alibaba	Harbans	Dara Singh, Nishi, Helen, Naaz, Tiwari, Hiralal, Ram Singh	Fantasy	Music: Hansraj Behl; Lyrics: Prem Dhawan
Faulad	Mohammed Hussain	Dara Singh, Mumtaz, Randhawa, Shyam Kumar, Kamran, Minu Mumtaz, Kamal Mehra	Action	Music: G. S. Kohli; Lyrics: Anjaan, Faruk Kaiser

== G-J ==
Title	Director	Cast	Genre	Notes
Gehra Daag	O. P. Ralhan	Mala Sinha, Rajendra Kumar, Usha Kiran, Madan Puri, Mumtaz, Tun Tun, Manmohan Krishna, Lalita Pawar, Sunder	Romance Crime Drama	Music: Ravi; Lyrics: Shakeel Badayuni
Ghar Basake Dekho	Kishore Sahu	Manoj Kumar, Rajshree, Savitri, Mehmood, Shyama, Johnny Walker, Lalita Pawar	Family Drama	Music: Chitragupta; Lyrics: Rajendra Krishan
Godaan	Trilok Jetley	Raaj Kumar, Kamini Kaushal, Manhar Desai, Shashikala, Madan Puri, Shobha Khote, Mehmood, Tun Tun	Family Drama	Based on the novel Godaan by Munshi Premchand. Music: Pandit Ravi Shankar; Lyrics: Anjaan
Grahasti	Kishore Sahu	Ashok Kumar, Nirupa Roy, Manoj Kumar, Rajshree, Soodesh Kumar, Shobha Khote, Mehmood	Family Drama	Music: Ravi; Lyrics: Shakeel Badayuni
Gul-e-Bakavali	Jugal Kishore	P. Jairaj, Nishi, Sulochana Chatterjee, Sunder, Tiwari, Maruti, Sapru, Naaz	Family	Music: Hansraj Behl; Lyrics: Naqsh Lyallpuri, Noor Devasi, Gulshan Bawra, Shyam Ralhan, Prem Warbartani
Gumrah	B. R. Chopra	Sunil Dutt, Mala Sinha, Ashok Kumar, Shashikala, Rehman, Nana Palsikar	Romantic drama	Music: Ravi; Lyrics: Sahir Ludhianvi
Hamrahi	T. Prakash Rao	Rajendra Kumar, Jamuna, Shobha Khote, Mehmood, O. P. Ralhan, Lalita Pawar	Romantic melodrama	Music: Shankar Jaikishan; Lyrics: Hasrat Jaipuri, Shailendra
Harishchandra Taramati	B. K. Adarsh	Prithviraj Kapoor, Jaymala, Babloo, Helen, B. M. Vyas, Ulhas, Tiwari, Babu Raje	Mythology	Music: Laxmikant Pyarelal; Lyrics: Kavi Pradeep
Holiday in Bombay	P. L. Santoshi	Shashi Kapoor, Vijaya Chaudhary, Shashikala, Laxmi Chhaya, Ulhas, Rajendranath, Dhumal, Sulochana Chatterjee, Jeevankala, Heera Sawant, Nazir Kashmiri	Romantic comedy	Music: N. Dutta; Lyrics: Anand Bakshi, Anjaan, P. L. Santoshi
The Householder	James Ivory	Shashi Kapoor, Leela Naidu, Jennifer Kendal, Pahari Sanyal, Durga Khote, Achala Sachdev, Harindranath Chattopadhyay, Jabeen Jalil	Family Drama	From the novel by Ruth Prawer. Music: Ustad Ali Akbar Khan Assistant: Jaidev
Jab Se Tumhe Dekha Hai	Kedar Kapoor	Pradeep Kumar, Geeta Bali, Agha, Vijayalaxmi, Dulari, Sunder, Shammi Kapoor, Shashi Kapoor, Mohan Choti, Tun Tun	Romantic drama	Music: Dattaram Wadkar; Lyrics: Shailendra
Jungle Boy	S. Pal	Indira Bansal, Shyam Kumar, Swaroop, Raj Rani, Maruti	Action Adventure	Music: Suresh Talwar; Lyrics: Anjaan
Junglee Raja	Vishwanath	Azad, Madhu, Heera Sawant, Samson, Babu Raje	Action Adventure	Music: Robin Banerjee; Lyrics: Yogesh

== K-M ==
Title	Director	Cast	Genre	Notes
Kabli Khan	K. Amarnath	Ajit, Helen, Jayant, Indira Bansal, Salim Khan, Samson, Mukri, W. M. Khan, Ulhas	Action	Music: Chitragupta; Lyrics: Majrooh Sultanpuri
Kahin Pyaar Na Ho Jaaye	Kalpataru	Mehmood, Shakila, Om Prakash, Shammi, Purnima, Johnny Walker, Jeevankala, Babu Raje	Romance Drama	Music: Kalyanji Anandji; Lyrics: Indeevar, Qamar Jalalabadi, Anand Bakshi, Asad Bhopali, Gulshan Bawra
Kala Ghoda	A. Shamsheer	Azad, Indira Billi, Heera, Shyam Kumar, Sawant	Action	Music: S. Kishan; Lyrics
Kala Jadoo	Mahmood	Hercules, Chandrakala, Habib, Tun Tun, Maqbul	Fantasy	Music: Iqbal; Lyrics: Shor Niyazi
Kan Kan Men Bhagwan	Babubhai Mistri	Anita Guha, Mahipal, Krishna Kumari, Raja Nene, Ratnamala, Ram Singh	Devotional	Music: Pandit Shivram; Lyrics: Bharat Vyas
Kaun Apna Kaun Paraya	Niranjan	Waheeda Rehman, Vijay Kumar, Nirupa Roy, Dulari, Johnny Walker, Shammi, Shyam Kumar	Family Drama	Music: Ravi; Lyrics: Shakeel Badayuni
Kinare Kinare	Chetan Anand	Dev Anand, Meena Kumari, Chetan Anand, Sunder, Kammo, Madhoo, Sukhdev	Romance Drama	Music: Jaidev; Lyrics: Nyaya Sharma
Laagi Nahi Chhute Ram	Kundan Kumar	Ashim Kumar, Kumkum, Helen, Leela Mishra, Nazir Hussain, Tiwari		Chitragupta; Lyrics: Majrooh Sultanpuri
Mansube Machlidar	Pramod Pati		Documentary	Music: Lyrics:
Maya Mahal	Chandrakant	Mahipal, Helen, Indira Billi, Sunder, Tiwari, Bela Bose, Ram Mohan	Fantasy	Music: Nashad; Lyrics: Asad Bhopali
Mere Arman Mere Sapne	Arvind Sen	Pradeep Kumar, Jayshree Gadkar, Sumitra Devi, Ashim Kumar, Pran, Abhi Bhattacharya	Romance Crime Drama	Music: Datta Naik; Lyrics: Rajendra Krishan
Mere Mehboob	H. S. Rawail	Rajendra Kumar, Sadhana, Ashok Kumar, Nimmi, Johnny Walker, Pran	Classic Muslim social	Music: Naushad; Lyrics: Shakeel Badayuni
Meri Surat Teri Ankhen	R. K. Rakhan	Ashok Kumar, Asha Parekh, Pradeep Kumar, Nadira, Achla Sachdev, Ishwarlal, Kanhaiyalal	Romance Drama	Music: S. D. Burman; Lyrics: Shailendra
Mujhe Jeene Do	Moni Bhattacharya	Sunil Dutt, Waheeda Rehman, Nirupa Roy, Durga Khote, Mumtaz, Cuckoo, Rajendra Nath, Anwar Hussain, Manorama	Dacoit Drama	Music: Jaidev; Lyrics: Sahir Ludhianvi
Mulzim	N. A. Ansari	Pradeep Kumar, Shakila, Helen, Johnny Walker, N. A. Ansari, Nilofer, Nasreen	Crime Drama	Music: Ravi; Lyrics: Shakeel Badayuni
Mummy Daddy	Narendra Dave	Sudesh Kumar, Ameeta, Lalita Pawar, Tiwari, Manorama	Family Drama	Music: Chitragupta; Lyrics: Prem Dhawan

== N-R ==
Title	Director	Cast	Genre	Notes
Naag Mohini	Shantilal Soni	Mahipal, Vijaya Chaudhary, Sunder, Rajan Haksar, Uma Dutt	Fantasy	Music: Sardar Malik; Lyrics: Bharat Vyas
Nartakee	Nitin Bose	Sunil Dutt, Nanda, Zeb Rehman, Om Prakash, Surekha, Agha, Aruna Irani, Nana Palsikar, Moni Chatterjee, Polson	Social Drama	Music: Ravi; Lyrics: Shakeel Badayuni
Parasmani	Babubhai Mistri	Mahipal, Ragini, Helen, Nalini Chonkar, Manhar Desai, Jeevankala, Aruna Irani, Jugal Kishore	Fantasy	Music: Laxmikant Pyarelal; Lyrics: Asad Bhopali, Indeevar
Phir Wohi Dil Laya Hoon	Nasir Hussain	Asha Parekh, Joy Mukherjee, Pran, Rajendra Nath, Veena, Tabassum, Shetty, Ram Avtar, Krishan Dhawan	Romance	Music: O. P. Nayyar; Lyrics: Majrooh Sultanpuri
Phool Bane Angaarey	Suraj Prakash	Raaj Kumar, Mala Sinha		
Pyaar Kiya To Darna Kya	B. S. Ranga	Shammi Kapoor, B. Saroja Devi, Prithviraj Kapoor, Pran, Om Prakash	Romantic Family Drama	Music: Ravi; Lyrics: Shakeel Badayuni
Pyar Ka Bandhan	Naresh Saigal	Raaj Kumar, Nishi, Naaz, Helen, Dhumal	Family Drama	Music: Ravi; Lyrics: Sahir Ludhianvi, Naqsh Lyallpuri, Qamar Jalalabadi
Raaja	Radhakant	Jagdeep, Vijaya Chaudhary, Jeevan, Helen, Veena, Sunder, Ulhas	Drama	Music: S. N. Tripathi; Lyrics: Anand Bakshi, Prem Dhawan
Rocket Tarzan	B. J. Patel	Rajan, Shakila Bano Bhopali, Polson, Nilofar, Shanti, Dalpat, Bhagwandas	Fantasy Sci-Fi	Music: Robin Banerjee; Lyrics: Yogesh
Rustam Sohrab	Vishram Bedekar	Prithviraj Kapoor, Suraiya, Premnath, Mumtaz, Murad, Sajjan	Costume Action Legend	Music: Sajjad; Lyrics: Jan Nissar Akhtar
Rustom-E-Baghdad	B. J. Patel	Dara Singh, Vijaya Chaudhary, Chandrashekhar, Randhawa, Sumitra Devi, Shakila Bano Bhopali	Costume Action	Music: Datta Naik; Lyrics: Asad Bhopali

== S-Z ==
Title	Director	Cast	Genre	Notes
Sehra	V. Shantaram	Sandhya, Prashant, Lalita Pawar, Mumtaz, Manmohan Krishan, Ulhas, Babloo, M. Rajan, Baburao Pendharkar	Romantic Family Drama	Music: Ramlal; Lyrics: Hasrat Jaipuri
Shaheed Bhagat Singh	K. A. Bansal	Shammi Kapoor, Prem Nath, Shakila, Achala Sachdev, D. K. Sapru, Ulhas	Patriotic	Music:Husnlal Bhagatram; Lyrics: Qamar Jalalabadi, Bismil Azimabadi
Shehar Aur Sapna	K.A. Abbas	Dilip Roy, Surekha Parker, Manmohan Krishan, Anwar Hussain	Social Drama	National Film Award for Best Feature Film, 1 Filmfare Award, Best Film, Best Director, Best Story nominations. Music: Lyrics:
Shikari	Mohammed Hussain	Ajit Khan, Ragini, Helen, Madan Puri, Habib, K. N. Singh, Bir Sakuja, Randhir Kapoor, Tun Tun, Kamal Mehra, Shyam Kumar	Fantasy Action	Music: G. S. Kohli; Lyrics: Farooq Qaisar, Qamar Jalalabadi
Taj Mahal	M. Sadiq	Pradeep Kumar, Bina Rai, Rehman, Veena, Jabeen Jalil, Jeevan, Helen, Murad, Minu Mumtaz	Historical romantic fiction	Music: Roshan; Lyrics: Sahir Ludhianvi
Tarzan Aur Jadugar	Radhakant	Chitra, Azad, Indira Billi, Arvind Pandya, Tun Tun, Sunder, Rajrani	Fantasy Action	Music: Suresh Talwa; Lyrics: Zafar Rahi
Teen Ghaaranay	K. A. Abbas		Short, Documentary	
Tere Ghar Ke Samne	Vijay Anand	Dev Anand, Nutan, Om Prakash, Harindranath Chattopadhyay, Jankidas, Parveen Choudhary, Rajendra Nath, Mumtaz Begum, Rashid Khan	Romantic comedy	Music: Sachin Dev Burman; Lyrics: Hasrat Jaipuri
Ustad Alauddin Khan	Ritwik Ghatak	Nikhil Banerjee, Allaudin Khan	Documentary	Produced by Sangeet Natak Akademi; Music advisor: Ustad Ali Akbar Khan
Ustadon Ke Ustad	Brij	Ashok Kumar, Pradeep Kumar, Shakila, Sheikh Mukhtar, Johnny Walker, Helen, Anwar Hussain	Action Thriller	Music: Ravi; Lyrics: Asad Bhopali
Yeh Dil Kisko Doon	K. Mishra	Shashi Kapoor, Ragini, Jeevan, Agha, Sajjan, Kamal Mehra	Romance Drama	Music: Iqbal Qureshi; Lyrics: Qamar Jalalabadi
Yeh Rastey Hain Pyar Ke	R. K. Nayyar	Sunil Dutt, Leela Naidu, Ashok Kumar, Rehman, Motilal, Shashikala, Hari Shivdasani, Manmohan	Romantic Thriller	Music: Ravi; Lyrics: Rajendra Krishan
Zarak Khan	Harbans	P. Jairaj, Chitra, Tiwari, Kumud Tripathi, Naazi, W. M. Khan	Costume Action	Music: S. Mohinder; Lyrics: Anand Bakshi, Saba Rampuri
Zingaro	Chandrakant	P. Jairaj, Jabeen Jalil, Tiwari, Bela Bose, Maruti	Fantasy Action	Music: S. N. Tripathi; Lyrics: Prem Dhawan
