= List of Hindi films of 1971 =

The following is a list of films produced by the Bollywood film industry based in Mumbai in 1971:

== Highest-grossing films ==
These are the highest-grossing Hindi films of 1971. Gross collection figures are worldwide, unless otherwise noted.

Rank	Title	Gross collection	Notes
1	Purab Aur Paschim	₹7.65 crore	
2	Haathi Mere Saathi	₹7 crore	Domestic gross
3	Mera Gaon Mera Desh	₹6 crore	Domestic gross
4	Naya Zamana	₹4.47 crore	
5	Andaz	₹4.14 crore	
6	Kati Patang	₹3.97 crore	
7	Maryada	₹3.94—4.50 crore	Box Office India erroneously put the former figure as worldwide, and the latter as domestic.
8	Caravan	₹3.60 crore	Domestic gross
9	Hare Rama Hare Krishna	₹3.40 crore	Domestic gross
10	Anand	₹2.71 crore	

== A-Z ==
Title	Director	Cast	Genre	Sources
Aag Aur Daag	A. Salaam	Joy Mukherjee, Poonam Sinha, Helen, Madan Puri	Action	
Aap Aye Bahaar Ayee	Mohan Kumar	Rajendra Kumar, Sadhna, Prem Chopra	Comedy	
Adhikar	S. M. Sagar	Ashok Kumar, Nanda, Deb Mukherjee, Pran	Drama	
Aisa Bhi Hota Hai	Kamran	Deb Mukherjee, Nandita Bose		
Albela	A. Shamsheer	Mehmood, Aruna Irani	Drama	
Anand	Hrishikesh Mukherjee	Rajesh Khanna, Amitabh Bachchan, Ramesh Deo, Sumita Sanyal	Drama	
Andaz	Ramesh Sippy	Shammi Kapoor, Hema Malini, Rajesh Khanna	Drama	
Anubhav	Basu Bhattacharya	Tanuja, Sanjeev Kumar	Drama	
Ashadh Ka Ek Din	Mani Kaul	Arun Khopkar, Rekha Sabnis	Historical Drama	
Badnam Basti	Prem Kapoor	Nitin Sethi, Nadita Thakur	Drama	
Badnam Farishte	Qamar Narvi	Sharmila Tagore, Rajesh Khanna	Drama	
Balidaan	Ravi Tandon	Saira Banu, Manoj Kumar	Drama	
Banphool	Vijay Bhatt	Jeetendra, Babita, Shatrughan Sinha	Romance	
Beharoopia	Rajesh Nanda	Dheeraj Kumar, Snehlata, Helen	Drama	
Bikhre Moti	Tapi Chanakya	Jeetendra, Babita	Romance	
Buddha Mil Gaya	Hrishikesh Mukherjee	Navin Nischol, Om Prakash, Archana	Drama	
Caravan	Nasir Hussain	Jeetendra, Asha Parekh, Aruna Irani	Romance	
Chaahat	Homi Bhattacharya	Jeetendra, Mumtaz, Mala Sinha	Romance	
Chhoti Bahu	K. B. Tilak	Rajesh Khanna, Sharmila Tagore	Drama	
Do Boond Pani	Khwaja Ahmad Abbas	Simi Garewal, Madhu Chanda, Jalal Agha	Drama	
Do Raha	Firoze Chinoy	Shatrughan Sinha, Anil Dhawan, Radha Saluja	Drama	
Door Ka Raahi	Kishore Kumar	Tanuja, Kishore Kumar, Ashok Kumar	Drama	
Dost Aur Dushman	Kewal Mishra	Shatrughan Sinha, Rekha, Vinod Khanna	Drama	
Dushmun	Dulal Guha	Rajesh Khanna, Mumtaz	Drama	
Ek Nari Ek Brahmachari	Kotayya Pratyagatma	Jeetendra, Mumtaz, Aruna Irani	Comedy	
Ek Paheli	Naresh Kumar	Sanjeev Kumar, Tanuja, Feroz Khan, Aruna Irani	Thriller	
Elaan	K. Ramanlal	Vinod Mehra, Vinod Khanna, Rekha, Madan Puri	Thriller	
Ek Thi Reeta	Roop K. Shorey	Vinod Mehra, Tanuja, I. S. Johar, Rehman, Daisy Irani, Faryal, Lolita Chatterjee	Drama	
Gambler	Amarpreet	Dev Anand, Zaheeda, Shatrughan Sinha, Zaheera	Thriller	
Ganga Tera Pani Amrit	Virendra Sinha	Nirupa Roy, Narendra Nath, Pran, Navin Nischol, Yogeeta Bali, Shatrugan Sinha	Drama	
Guddi	Hrishikesh Mukherjee	Dharmendra, Jaya Bhaduri, Pran	Romance	
Haathi Mere Saathi	M. A. Thirumugham	Rajesh Khanna, Tanuja	Romance	
Haré Rama Haré Krishna	Dev Anand	Dev Anand, Zeenat Aman, Mumtaz, Prem Chopra, Rajendra Nath	Drama	
Haseenon Ka Devata	Ravikant Nagaich	Sanjay Khan, Rekha, Helen	Drama	
Hulchul	O. P. Ralhan	Prem Chopra, Kabir Bedi, Zeenat Aman, Helen, Madan Puri	Thriller	
Hum Tum Aur Woh	Shiv Kumar	Vinod Khanna, Bharathi Vishnuvardhan	Drama	
Hungama	S. M. Abbas	Kishore Kumar, Vinod Khanna, Mumtaz, Zeenat Aman	Comedy	
Jaane-Anjaane	Shakti Samanta	Shammi Kapoor, Vinod Khanna, Leena Chandavarkar	Drama	
Jai Bangladesh	I. S. Johar	Kabari Choudhury, Dilip Dutt	Drama	
Jai Jawan Jai Makan	Vishram Bedekar	Jaya Bhaduri, Anil Dhawan	Drama	
Jal Bin Machhli Nritya Bin Bijli	Rajaram Vankudre Shantaram	Dina Pathak, Abhijeet	Romance	
Jawan Mohabbat	Bhappi Sonie	Shammi Kapoor, Asha Parekh, Mumtaz, Pran	Romance	
Johar Mehmood in Hong Kong	S. A. Akbar	Mehmood, Aruna Irani, Pran	Comedy	
Jwala	M. V. Raman	Sunil Dutt, Madhubala, Pran	Action	
Kabhi Dhoop Kabhi Chhaon	Chandrakant	Dara Singh, Ameeta	Drama	
Kahin Aar Kahin Paar	Maruti	Joy Mukherjee, Vimi, Helen, Nadira	Romance	
Kal Aaj Aur Kal	Randhir Kapoor	Prithviraj Kapoor, Raj Kapoor, Randhir Kapoor, Babita	Drama	
Kangan	K. B. Tilak	Aruna Irani, Mala Sinha, Sanjeev Kumar	Drama	
Kathputli	Brij	Jeetendra, Mumtaz	Romance	
Kati Patang	Shakti Samanta	Rajesh Khanna, Asha Parekh	Romance	
Khoj	Jugal Kishore	Farida Jalal, Shatrughan Sinha	Drama	
Ladki Pasand Hai	C. L. Rawal	Deepak Kumar, Mumtaz, Rajendranath, Mehmood Jr	Drama	
Lagan	Ramanna	Prem Chopra, Nutan, Parikhsat Sani, Farida Jalal.	Drama	
Lakhon Me Ek	S. S. Balan	Aruna Irani, Mehmood, Pran	Comedy	
Lal Patthar	Sushil Majumdar	Raaj Kumar, Hema Malini, Raakhee, Vinod Mehra	Romance	
Main Sunder Hoon	R. Krishnan	Mehmood, Biswajeet, Leena Chandavarkar	Drama	
Man Mandir	Tapi Chanakya	Sanjeev Kumar, Waheeda Rehman, Rakesh Roshan	Drama	
Man Tera Tan Mera	B. R. Ishara	Rehana Sultan, Anil Dhavan, Shatrugan Sinha.	Drama	
Maryada	Aravind Sen	Rajesh Khanna, Mala Sinha, Pran	Romance	
Mehboob Ki Mehndi	Harnam Singh Rawail	Rajesh Khanna, Leena Chandavarkar	Romance	
Mela	Prakash Mehra	Sanjay Khan, Mumtaz, Feroz Khan	Drama	
Memsaab	Atma Ram	Vinod Khanna, Yogeeta Bali	Drama	
Mera Gaon Mera Desh	Raj Khosla	Asha Parekh, Dharmendra, Vinod Khanna	Drama	
Mere Apne	Gulzar	Meena Kumari, Vinod Khanna, Shatrughan Sinha	Drama	
Nadaan	Deven Verma	Asha Parekh, Navin Nischol	Drama	
Naya Zamana	Pramod Chakravorty	Dharmendra, Hema Malini, Ashok Kumar, Pran	Romance	
Paras	C. P. Dixit	Sanjeev Kumar, Shatrughan Sinha, Raakhee	Drama	
Paraya Dhan	Rajendra Bhatia	Hema Malini, Rakesh Roshan, Balraj Sahni	Drama	
Parde Ke Peechey	K. Shankar	Vinod Mehra, Yogeeta Bali, Bindu, Pran	Drama	
Parwana	Jyoti Swaroop	Amitabh Bachchan, Navin Nischol, Yogeeta Bali	Psychological Thriller	
Patanga	Kedar Kapoor	Shashi Kapoor Vimi, Zeb Rehman	Drama	
Phir Bhi	Shivendra Sinha	Pratap Sharma, Urmila Bhatt, Suresh Oberoi	Drama	
Preet Ki Dori	Satish Kumar	Parikshit Sahni, Tanuja	Drama	
Preetam	Bhappi Sonie	Shammi Kapoor, Leena Chandavarkar	Romance	
Pyar Ki Kahani	Ravikant Nagaich	Amitabh Bachchan, Tanuja, Mala Sinha	Drama	
Raga	Howard Worth	Ravi Shankar	Documentary	
Rakhwala	Adurthi Subba Rao	Dharmendra, Leena Chandavarkar	Romance	
Ramu Ustad	Mohammed Hussain	Madan Puri, Dara Singh	Drama	
Reshma Aur Shera	Sunil Dutt	Sunil Dutt, Waheeda Rehman, Amitabh Bachchan, Vinod Khanna		
Saat Sawal	Babubhai Mistry	Johnny Whisky	Drama	
Saaz Aur Sanam	J. B. H. Wadia	Rekha, Premendra	Romance	
Sanjog	S.S. Balan	Amitabh Bachchan, Mala Sinha	Comedy	
Sansar	Dilip Bose	Anupama, Nirupa Roy	Drama	
Seema	Surendra Mohan	Kabir Bedi, Simi Garewal, Rakesh Roshan, Bharati, Padma Khanna, Abhi Bhattacharya	Drama	
Sharmeelee	Samir Ganguly	Shashi Kapoor, Raakhee	Romance	
Shri Krishna Leela	Homi Wadia	Sachin, Hina, Jayshree Gadkar, Sapru, Manhar Desai, Tabassum	Religious	
Tere Mere Sapne	Vijay Anand	Dev Anand, Vijay Anand, Mumtaz, Hema Malini, Tabassum, Agha		
Tulsi Vivah	Chandrakant	Abhi Bhattacharya, Dara Singh, Randhawa, Jayshree Gadkar, Anita Guha	Mythology Religious Drama	
Ummeed	Nitin Bose	Ashok Kumar, Joy Mukherjee, Leela Naidu, Nanda, Leela Mishra, Tun Tun	Family Social Drama	
Upaasna	Mohan	Sanjay Khan, Feroz Khan, Helen, Anwar Hussain	Drama	
Uphaar	Sudhendu Roy	Jaya Badhuri, Swarup Dutt, Kamini Kaushal, Suresh Chatwal, Leela Mishra	Family Drama	
Woh Din Yaad Karo	K. Amarnath	Sanjay Khan, Nanda, Mehmood, Madan Puri, Shashikala, Tun Tun, Wasti, Jayshree T.	Drama	

== See also ==
- List of Hindi films of 1970
- List of Hindi films of 1972
