= Tun Tun =

Indian actress (1923–2003)

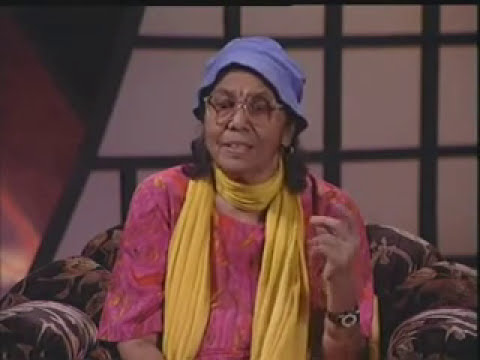
- Born: Uma Devi Khatri; 11 July 1923; Amroha, United Provinces, British India (present-day Uttar Pradesh, India)
- Died: 24 November 2003 (aged 80); Mumbai, India
- Occupations: Singer; Actress; Comedian
- Years active: 1946–1990
- Spouse: Akhtar Abbas Kazi (m. 1947)

Uma Devi Khatri (11 July 1923 – 24 November 2003), popularly known by her screen name Tun Tun, was an Indian playback singer and actress-comedian. She is often referred to as "Hindi cinema's first-ever comedienne".

== Early life ==
Uma was born on 1923 in a small village near Amroha District of Uttar Pradesh, India. Her parents and brother were murdered for land arrogate. Just two days before her demise, she had been interviewed by film critic and historian Shishir Krishna Sharma. She said, "I don't remember who my parents were and how they looked, I would be two to two and half years when they passed away, I had a brother eight or nine years old whose name was Hari, I just remembered that we were living in a village named Alipur. One day brother was killed and left for maid servant to relatives in exchange for two times meal, that time I was four or five years old".

== Career ==
She arrived in Bombay (Mumbai) at the age of 23, having run away from home, and knocked on composer Naushad Ali's door. She told him that she could sing and that she would throw herself in the ocean if he didn't give her a chance. He auditioned her, and hired her on the spot. She made her debut as a solo playback singer in Nazir's Wamiq Azra (1946). She soon signed a contract with the producer-director A.R. Kardar, who used Naushad as music director, and went on to make a place for herself amidst music stalwarts like Noor Jehan, Rajkumari, Khursheed Bano and Zohrabai Ambalewali.

In 1947, she had huge hits with "Afsana Likh Rahi Hoon Dil-e-Beqarar Ka", "Yeh Kaun Chala Meri Aankhon Mein Sama Kar" and "Aaj Machi Hai Dhoom Jhoom Khushi Se Jhoom", which she sang for actress Munawar Sultana in A.R. Kardar's Dard (1947), again under the music direction of Naushad, she also sang a duet; "Betaab Hai Dil Dard-e-Mohabat Ke Asar Se", with Suraiya. In fact, a gentleman from Delhi was so enamoured by her song "Afsana Likh Rahi Hoon", that he stayed with her in Bombay. They got married, and the couple had two daughters and two sons; her husband, whom she called Mohan, died in 1992.

The success of Dard meant that she next received Mehboob Khan's Anokhi Ada (1948), which again had two hit numbers, "Kahe Jiya Dole" and "Dil Ko Lagake Humne Kuch Bhi Na Paya". This brought her into the league of highly rated playback singers. She reached her peak as a vocalist in director S.S. Vasan's Chandralekha (1948) made by Gemini Studios, Madras. Her seven songs, which include hits such as "Saanjh Ki Bela" remain her most accomplished work in her singing career, though signing for the film also meant a breach of contract with producer-director Kardar, which led to her dwindling fortunes in the industry.

Moreover, in the following years, owing to her older style of singing and limited vocal range, she found it difficult to compete with the rising singers like Lata Mangeshkar, Suman Kalyanpur etc. Eventually Naushad suggested that she take up acting, because she had a very bubbly personality and wonderful comic timing. She was inspired and awestruck by Dilip Kumar and had a wish, maintaining it stubbornly that in her first film, she would act alongside him. Knowing about this crazy love for Dilip Kumar, Naushad asked Dilip Kumar, who was his friend, to cast her in one of his films, and she appeared in Babul (1950) with him, which had Nargis as the lead actress; it is he who renamed her "Tun Tun" to suit her comic persona, the name stayed with her, and a comedic legend was born.

She went on to act in Guru Dutt's classics such as Aar Paar (1954), Mr. & Mrs. '55 (1955) and Pyaasa (1957). In the 1960s and 1970s, she was a permanent comic relief in numerous Bollywood films; a few years down the line, she most notably starred with Amitabh Bachchan in Namak Halaal (1982), a Prakash Mehra blockbuster.

In her career spanning five decades, she acted in about 198 films in Hindi/Urdu and other languages like Punjabi etc., pairing with top comedy actors of her times such as Bhagwan Dada, Agha, Sunder, Mukri, Dhumal, Johnny Walker and Keshto Mukherjee. She was last seen in Hindi films in Kasam Dhande Ki (1990).

Owing to her popularity, the name Tun Tun has become synonymous with obese women in India.

== Personal life ==
Uma Devi met Akhtar Abbas Kazi, an Excise Duty Inspector, who helped and inspired her. At the time of the India-Pakistan partition, Kazi moved to Lahore, Pakistan. She was fed up with the circumstances of the time and she moved to Bombay to pursue singing in movies. Kazi also eventually moved to Bombay, where they got married in 1947. She used to refer to her husband as "Mohan".

== Death ==
She died on 23 November 2003 in Andheri, Mumbai, after a prolonged illness at the age of 80 and is survived by her four children and four grandchildren.

== Filmography ==
Year	Title	Role	Notes
1990	Kasam Dhande Ki	Prema	
1989	Shehzaade	Hitler's Bride	
1988	Ek Aadmi		
1987	Deewana Tere Naam Ka		
1986	Khel Mohabbat Ka	House Maid	
1985	Lover Boy	Phoolmati	
1985	Ghar Dwaar		
1985	Salma	Lady Singer – "Mumtaz's marriage"	
1984	Shorgul		
1984	Kamla		
1984	Raja Aur Rana	Havaldar's wife	as Tuntun
1984	Unchi Uraan		
1983	Coolie	Mother of 7 babies	
1983	Haadsa	Ladies Health Club Member	
1983	Painter Babu	Koyal	
1982	Heeron Ka Chor		
1982	Disco Dancer	Bride	uncredited
1982	Meharbaani		
1982	Haathkadi		
1982	Apradhi Kaun?	Nurse	
1982	Maine Jeena Seekh Liya	Miss Tun Tun	
1982	Namak Halaal	Female guest with a dog	
1982	Samraat	Woman aboard ship	uncredited
1982	Yeh To Kamaal Ho Gaya		
1981	Sannata		
1981	Biwi-O-Biwi	Mrs. Singh's friend – Faints at swimming pool	uncredited
1981	Saajan Ki Saheli	Maria	
1980	Andhera		
1980	Qurbani	Fat woman in car	
1980	Gori Dian Jhanjran	Bulbul's mother	
1980	Saajan Mere Main Saajan Ki		
1980	Yari Dushmani		
1979	Baton Baton Mein	Imaginary Nancy's mother	
1979	Sarkari Mehmaan	Bank employee	
1979	Lok Parlok	Sundari	
1978	Dil Aur Deewar	Madame	
1978	Phandebaaz		
1978	Ankhiyon Ke Jharokhon Se	Fat lady in the theatre	
1978	Nasbandi	Tonica	
1978	Ankh Ka Tara		
1978	Heeralal Pannalal		
1978	Premi Gangaram Punjabi movie	as Dano	
1978	Satyam Shivam Sundaram	Fat Lady	
1977	Pandit Aur Pathan	Champakali	
1977	Aap Ki Khatir	Dancer/Singer	
1977	Kabita		
1977	Tyaag		
1977	Agar... If	Champakali (Agarwal housemaid)	
1977	Amaanat	Referee	
1977	Chacha Bhatija	Kesto's bride	
1977	Do Sholay		Guest Appearance
1977	Gayatri Mahima		
1977	Paapi	Laila	
1977	Taxi Taxie	Mother of 9 children	
1977	Aafat		
1976	Vir Mangdavalo		Gujarati film
1976	Hera Pheri	Mrs. Dhaniram	
1976	Nagin	Maid	
1976	Aap Beati	Customer at Lord's Shoes	
1976	Bhagwan Samaye Sansar Mein	(as Tuntun)	
1976	Bundal Baaz	Rajaram's customer	
1976	Rangila Ratan		
1975	Aag Aur Toofan		as Tuntun
1975	Dhoti Lota Aur Chowpatty	Film heroine's mother	as Tun-Tun
1975	Stree Purush		
1974	Amir Garib	Governess	
1974	Naya Din Nai Raat	Mental Patient	
1974	Dil Diwana		
1974	Hamrahi		
1974	Maa Bahen Aur Biwi		
1974	My Friend		
1974	Sacha Mera Roop Hai		
1974	Shaitaan	Meena Advani	
1974	Thokar	Mukhti's wife	
1973	Kuchhe Dhaage	Ramaswanti Bharose	
1973	Bandhe Haath	Kavita	
1973	Heera		
1973	Jalte Badan	Chameli	
1973	Naag Mere Saathi		
1972	Gomti Ke Kinare	Petrol Pump owner's wife	
1972	Lalkar (The Challenge)	Danko	
1972	Aankhon Aankhon Mein	Mrs. Pereira	
1972	Apradh	Mrs. Fernandes	
1972	Be-Imaan		
1972	Bindiya Aur Bandook		
1972	Chori Chori		
1972	Dil Daulat Duniya	Baby's Mother	
1972	Ek Hasina Do Diwane	Phool Kumari	
1972	Garam Masala	Queen Khatoria	
1972	Mele Mitran De		Punjabi
1972	Mome Ki Gudiya	Daisy's mother	
1972	Sabse Bada Sukh		
1972	Samadhi	Kalavati	
1971	Hungama	Jagdeep's Mother	
1971	Upaasna		
1971	Ek Paheli	Lily	
1971	Hulchul	Philomena D'Costa	
1971	Johar Mehmood in Hong Kong	Sonia's Aunt	
1971	Preet Ki Dori		
1971	Shri Krishna Leela	Rasili's Chachi	
1971	Tulsi Vivah	Senapati's mother-in-law	
1971	Woh Din Yaad Karo		
1970	Heer Raanjha	Allah Rakhi	
1970	The Train		Guest Appearance
1970	Aansoo Aur Muskan	Bhagwanti	
1970	Ehsan	Mrs. Chaturmukh	
1970	Geet	Champavati 'Champa'	
1970	Himmat	Tiger's mother	
1970	Pehchan	Ganga's prospective bride	
1970	Rootha Na Karo	Neeta's maidservant	as Tuntun
1970	Sharafat	Champakali	as Tuntun
1969	Do Raaste	Swimming pool attendant	
1969	Anjaana	Mrs. Kapoor (Cooper)	
1969	Anmol Moti		
1969	Badi Didi		
1969	Shart	Lady at the Massage Parlour	
1969	Talash	Kamini	
1968	Duniya	Chabeeli	uncredited
1968	Aabroo	Whisky Rani	
1968	Abhilasha	Fat Lady	song "Yaaron Hamara Kya"
1968	Baharon Ki Manzil	Glory D'Silva	
1968	Dil Aur Mohabbat		
1968	Khiladi_	Geeta Maria "Miss Beauty"	
1968	Har Har Gange		
1968	Kanyadaan	Bansi's mother-in-law	
1968	Kismat		
1968	Parivar	Sitaram's employee	
1968	Sadhu Aur Shaitaan	Sundari	
1968	Suhaag Raat	Titli Banu	
1967	Pind Di Kuri		Punjabi
1967	Aag	Phoolmati	
1967	Badrinath Yatra	Maid at brothel	
1967	C.I.D. 909	Julie Fernandes D'Silva Ghobewali	
1967	Dil Ne Pukara	Kamla	
1967	Duniya Nachegi		
1967	Gunahon Ka Devta		
1967	Hare Kanch Ki Chooriyan	Julie's Mother	as Tuntun
1967	Upkar	Lakhpati's Wife	as Tuntun
1966	Aakhri Khat		
1966	Afsana		
1966	Dil Diya Dard Liya	Mrs. Murlidhar	
1966	Dillagi		
1966	Kunwari		
1966	Ladka Ladki	Rajkumari Nirmala Devi	
1966	Phool Aur Patthar	Mrs. Alopinath (Guddki)	as Tuntun
1966	Sagaai	Anarkali	
1966	Tarzan Aur Jadui Chirag		
1966	Thakur Jarnail Singh		
1966	Alibaba Aur 40 Chor		
1965	Johar-Mehmood in Goa	Simmi's Cellmate	
1965	Ek Sapera Ek Lutera	Bindu	
1965	Jab Jab Phool Khile	Mary	Guest Appearance
1965	Kaajal	Amba	
1965	Lutera		
1965	Maharaja Vikram		
1965	Mohabbat Isko Kahete Hain	Baby	as Tuntun
1965	Raaka		
1965	Rustom-E-Hind		
1965	Saheli	Mother of 5 children	
1964	Main Jatti Punjab Di	Taro	Punjabi Movie
1964	Cha Cha Cha	Mohan's Mother	
1964	Rajkumar	Champakali	
1964	Aaya Toofan	Maha Dasi	
1964	Darasingh: Ironman	Rangili's mother	
1964	Fariyad		
1964	Ganga Ki Lahren	Maid	
1964	Kashmir Ki Kali	Rama Devi	
1964	Khufia Mahal		
1964	Mr. X in Bombay	Kamini	
1963	Bluff Master	Lajwanti	
1963	Ek Dil Sao Afsane	Wedding Guest	
1963	Ek Raaz	Champakali	
1963	Gehra Daag	Sundari	as Tuntun
1963	Godaan		
1963	Jab Se Tumhe Dekha Hai	Kitty's servant	
1963	Kaun Apna Kaun Paraya		
1963	Naag Rani	Chand's friend (uncredited)	
1963	Phool Bane Angaare	Kamla's sister-in-law	
1963	Shikari		
1963	Ganga Maiyya Tohe Piyari Chadhaibo\		Bhojpuri Film
1963	Ustadon Ke Ustad	Hostess of Qawwali contest	
1963	Punjabi movie|		
1963	Pind Di Kurhi | |		
1962	China Town | |	Mahakali	
1962	Dilli Ka Thug		
1962	Half Ticket	Real Munna's Mother	
1962	Jhoola	Mother	
1962	Professor	Phool Rani	
1962	Son of India	Gopal's foster mother	
1962	Umeed		
1962	Vallah Kya Baat Hai		
1961	Chaudhvin Ka Chand	Naseeban	as Uma Devi
1961	Gunga Jumna	Bhajiwali	uncredited
1961	Passport	Woman who offers shelter to Reeta & Shekhar	
1961	Shama	Vee Aapa	
1960	Bombai Ka Babu		
1960	Dil Apna Aur Preet Parai	Haseena	
1960	Dil Bhi Tera Hum Bhi Tere	Moti's Mother	
1960	Ek Phool Char Kaante	Jamnabai	
1960	Jaali Note	Mrs. Malik	uncredited
1960	Kiklee		
1960	Kohinoor		
1959	Bank Manager		
1959	Bhai-Bahen	Julie	
1959	Black Cat	Mrs. Ramanlal	uncredited
1959	Chacha Zindabad		
1959	Jungle King		
1959	Kaagaz Ke Phool	Telephone Operator	
1959	Kavi Kalidas	Kali's step-mom	
1959	Qaidi No. 911		
1959	Ujala		
1958	12 O'Clock	Kumari Natesh Sundari	as Uma Devi
1958	Aakhri Dao	Muthuswami's Daughter	
1958	Aji Bas Shukriya		
1958	Lajwanti	Tun Tun	uncredited
1958	Malik		
1958	Criminal	Lajwanti 'Lajo'	
1958	Phir Subah Hogi	Ram's Landlord	uncredited
1958	Solva Saal	Aspiring actress/Singer	
1957	Pyaasa	Pushplata	
1957	Captain Kishore		
1957	Do Roti		
1957	Mirza Sahiban		
1957	Ram Lakshman		
1956	Anuraag		
1956	C.I.D.	Complainant in police station	as Uma Devi
1956	Fifty Fifty		
1956	Jagte Raho	Sati's mother	uncredited
1956	Pocketmaar	Shukal's prospective mother-in-law	uncredited
1956	Raj Hath		
1956	Kismet Ka Khel		as Uma Devi
1955	Shree 420	Maya's neighbour	as Uma Devi
1955	Albeli		
1955	Bahu		
1955	Hatimtai Ki Beti		
1955	Marine Drive	Johny's wife (as Uma Devi)	
1955	Milap	Mrs. Akhrodwala	
1955	Mr. & Mrs. '55	Lily D'Silva	as Uma Devi
1955	Pehli Jhalak	Dancer (song "Achchi Surat Huwi")	
1955	Uran Khatola	Hira's girlfriend	as Tuntun
1954	Aar-Paar	Rustom's mother	
1954	Gul Bahar		as Uma Devi
1953	Baaz	A masseuse	
1953	Gunah		
1952	Amber	Chorus singer/dancer	
1951	Deedar	Rai' s maidservant	as Uma Devi
1951	Dholak	Aaya	as Uma Devi
1950	Babul		

== Songs ==
Year	Film	Song	Composer	Writer(s)	Co-artist(s)
1947	Dard	"Afsana Likh Rahi Hoon"	Naushad	Shakeel Badayuni	
1947	Dard	"Aaj Machi Hai Dhum"	Naushad	Shakeel Badayuni	
1947	Dard	"Yeh Kaun Chala Yeh Kaun Shala"	Naushad	Shakeel Badayuni	
1947	Dard	"Betaab Hai Dil Dard-E-Mohabbat Ke Asar Se"	Naushad	Shakeel Badayuni	Suraiya
1949	Dillagi	"De Dhil De Dhil O Ree Sakhi"	Naushad	Shakeel Badayuni	Shamshad Begum
1978	Premi Gangaram Punjabi Movie	"Khunda Khol"	Sonik Omi	Verma Malik	Mehar Mittal
