= Oli Vilakku =

1968 film by Tapi Chanakya

- Theatrical release poster
- Directed by: Tapi Chanakya
- Screenplay by: Sornam (dialogues)
- Based on: Phool Aur Patthar by O. P. Ralhan
- Produced by: S. S. Vasan
- Starring: M. G. Ramachandran; Jayalalithaa; Sowcar Janaki
- Cinematography: U. Rajagopal
- Edited by: M. Umanath
- Music by: M. S. Viswanathan
- Production company: Gemini Studios
- Distributed by: Jothi Pictures
- Release date: 20 September 1968
- Running time: 164 minutes
- Country: India
- Language: Tamil

Oli Vilakku (transl. Shining Lamp) is a 1968 Indian Tamil-language action film, directed by Tapi Chanakya and produced by S. S. Vasan. It is a remake of the Hindi-language film Phool Aur Patthar (1966). The film stars M. G. Ramachandran (in his 100th film), Jayalalithaa and Sowcar Janaki, with S. A. Ashokan, Manohar, Cho and V. S. Raghavan in supporting roles. It was released on 20 September 1968, and was one of the most successful Tamil films of the year, and became a turning point in Ramachandran's career.

In the film, a burglar rescues a widowed woman whose in-laws had left her to die during an outbreak of plague. He is soon framed for kidnapping her by relatives who are after the woman's inheritance.

== Plot ==
Muthu is a career criminal who works for Master Jambu along with his girlfriend Geetha. Who becomes friends with Kadri, another petty thief. Due to his repetitive crimes, the court orders him to stay in a small town for six months. But, two days before his release, he escapes. Master Jambu gives him another job to rob a safe full of gold from the rich. When a plague empties Maanggudi of its inhabitants; Muthu takes the opportunity to burgle a house.

Muthu finds nothing except Shanti. She is A widowed daughter-in-law which the cruel relatives had left to die. Pannaiyar Paramsivam, his wife, and their son, Somu. Shanti has married off when she was four years old to a boy of five years old. But the boy dies soon after. Muthu brings a local village doctor, Kannaiyah, and nurses her back to health. When her relatives return, they are not pleased to find her alive. And even less pleased to discover that someone has tried to rob them. Shanti gets the blame and a beating as they suspect her of having an affair with thief, Muthu. Somu, Pannaiyar Paramasivam's other son, tries to rape Shanti. Muthu saves her from this and the pair flee, with help of Kadri, who treats Shanti as her sister. They set up home in Muthu's house. Much to the displeasure of the respectable neighbours, who are all too ready to think the worst. Shanti's relatives feel dismayed when a lawyer arrives to announce that Shanti's uncle, has left a legacy for 500,000 rupees. They hatch a plot to get her back. By making false police report that Muthu kidnapped Shanti and stole their gold. This is overheard by the Kannaiyah who happens to pass by to visit Shanti and Muthu.

Muthu approaches Master Jambu to borrow money. Yet, Jambu sedates him. Geetha assists with hesitation, Master Jambu. Fearing that they may lose Muthu. Then, Kannaiyah steals the gold from Pannaiyar Paramasivam, which Kadhri learns of. Meanwhile, Shanti appears as a local prostitute by the local neighbours. Which enrages Muthu, culminating in an assault by him on one of the neighbours. Shanti pacifies Muthu and Muthu reforms to be a good man. One day, Somu notices Muthu with Geetha. Somu, with the help of police, chase both of them but they escape. Somu meets the commissioner and both of them then go to see Muthu and Shanti. But, Kadri, disguised as Shanti, saves them. Shanti persuades both Kadri and Muthu to reform. Master Jambu learns that Muthu reforms through Shanti. He persuades Muthu to steal a diamond necklace worth 2 million. Muthu, with hesitation, agrees that the robbery will be his last in exchange for his freedom. Master Jambu reveals that about three years ago, while he was committing a bank robbery, Muthu tried to stop them and saw the robbery. Yet, he cannot prove this to the court due to his past criminal history. Muthu came out after one year from his jail sentence. He works with the commissioner to nab the real culprits, but is fooled by Master Jambu. Master Jambu then traps Muthu into his gang, by playing drama. Geetha, through accident, kills Master Jambu gang member Rathnam to save Muthu. Yet, Rathnam is still alive and both Muthu and Geetha believe that Rathnam is dead. The rest of the story follows how Muthu escapes from Master Jambu's gang, and Shanti and Geetha's fate.

== Cast ==
- M. G. R as Muthu
- Jayalalithaa as Geetha
- Sowcar Janaki as Shanti
- Ashokan as Master Jambu
- Cho as Kadhri
- Manohar as Maari
- Rama Rao as Pannaiyar Paramasivan
- V. S. Raghavan as the commissioner
- Kallapart Natarajan as Somu
- Thengai Srinivasan as Kaveri's father
- Gandhimathi as Kaveri
- C. I. D. Sakunthala as a dancer in the song "Whistlings, Sips and Drunkenness" (uncredited)

== Production ==
Oli Vilakku was directed by Tapi Chanakya and produced by S. S. Vasan under Gemini Studios; Vasan was not credited onscreen as producer. The film was M. G. Ramachandran's 100th as an actor, and a remake of the Hindi-language film Phool Aur Patthar (1966). Ramachandran agreed to act in the film only after long sessions of negotiations with Vasan, who assented to the conditions laid down by Ramachandran regarding to the choice of costume and the characterisation of the male lead. It was Gemini' first colour film, being colourised through Eastmancolor, and was V. S. Raghavan's first collaboration with Ramachandran. While Jayalalithaa was chosen to reprise the role originally played by Shashikala, Sowcar Janaki asked Ramachandran if she could reprise Meena Kumari's role; he accepted. This was the second time after Shavukaru (1950) that Janaki asked for a role.

The dialogues were written by Sornam, art direction was handled by A. K. Sekhar, cinematography was handled by U. Rajagopal and the editing by M. Umanath. While Janaki was initially billed as the first female actress in the opening credits, Jayalalithaa along with mother Sandhya insisted and demanded she be billed first as she considered herself more popular; her request was granted. Producer S. S. Vasan eventually convinced Janaki. During the film's Kodaikanal shooting schedule, Ramachandran cancelled a day's shoot because of the cold weather and ensured that all the crew members received a blanket. Unlike the original, where the male lead (Dharmendra) marries the widow (Kumari), the climax was changed for Oli Vilakku at Ramachandran's suggestion; it ends with the male lead (Ramachandran) marrying the unmarried woman (Jayalalithaa) while the widow (Janaki) dies.

== Soundtrack ==
The music was composed by M. S. Viswanathan and lyrics were written by Vaali. One sequence required Ramachandran to act drunk and mouth a song. Ramachandran, who generally avoided smoking and drinking in films, was stuck in a dilemma, and approached Vaali who presented a solution: Ramachandran's character would be drunk, but his conscience would emerge as four different beings to criticise his acting in the song. Ramachandran then asked Vaali for the pallavi, and Vaali wrote the lines "Dhayiriamaaga sol nee manidhan thaanaa, Nee thaan oru mirugam, Indha madhuvil vizhum neram" (Tell me bravely, are you a human? You are a beast when you fall into this alcohol), which impressed Ramachandran. The song "Aandavane Un" is set in Shivaranjani raga. "Naan Kanda Kanavil" is based on "Zindagi Mein Pyar Karna" from the Hindi original, and the Portuguese song "Andorinha Preta". The instrumental piece "Whistlings, Sips and Drunkenness" is not included in the soundtrack.

Track listing
No.	Title	Singer(s)	Length
1.	"Thairiyamaka Chol"	T. M. Soundararajan	3:23
2.	"Nanga Pudusa"	T. M. Soundararajan, P. Susheela	3:12
3.	"Aandavane Un"	P. Susheela	3:16
4.	"Rukminiye"	T. M. Soundararajan, L. R. Eswari	3:18
5.	"Mampazha Thottam"	Sirkazhi Govindarajan, L. R. Eswari	4:15
6.	"Iraiva Un Maaligaiyil"	P. Susheela	4:04
7.	"Nee Thaan"	T. M. Soundararajan	3:21
8.	"Naan Kanda Kanavinil"	L. R. Eswari	3:09
Total length:			27:58

== Release and reception ==
Oli Vilakku was released on 20 September 1968, and distributed by Jothi Pictures. Two days later, the reviewer from The Indian Express derided the film, saying it "lapses into mediocrity thanks to inept handling of the theme and unconvincing performances." The reviewer criticised the performances of Ramachandran and Jayalalithaa, but praised that of Janaki. On 6 October 1968, the magazine Ananda Vikatan published a review jointly conducted by many people, most of whom positively commented on the film. Oli Vilakku was Ramachandran's eleventh turning point in his career. According to historian Randor Guy, the film was "one of the biggest hits of 1968", and performed well even in Sri Lanka. At Zainstan Cinema Hall at Colombo, it ran for over 150 days.

== Legacy ==
When Ramachandran was hospitalised in 1984 at Brooklyn Hospital, New York, footage showing a tearful Janaki lip syncing to "Aandavane Un" prefaced film screenings across cinema halls in Tamil Nadu.

== Bibliography ==
- David, C. R. W. (1983). Cinema as Medium of Communication in Tamil Nadu. Christian Literature Society. OCLC 10443988.
- Kannan, R. (2017). MGR: A Life. India: Penguin Random House. ISBN 978-93-86495-88-4.
