= Talash (1969 film) =

- Theatrical release poster
- Directed by: O. P. Ralhan
- Written by: Ehsan Rizvi(dialogues)
- Screenplay by: O. P. Ralhan
- Story by: O. P. Ralhan
- Produced by: O. P. Ralhan
- Starring: Rajendra Kumar; Sharmila Tagore; O. P. Ralhan; Balraj Sahni
- Music by: S. D. Burman
- Production company: Mehboob Studios
- Release date: 1969
- Running time: 175 minutes
- Country: India
- Language: Hindi
- Budget: est.₹1 crore

Talash is a 1969 Hindi drama film directed by O. P. Ralhan starring Rajendra Kumar and Sharmila Tagore in lead roles. This was the first Indian movie which was publicised as having a budget of Rs 1 Crore (i.e. INR 10 Millions).

== Plot ==
Raj Kumar (Rajendra Kumar) dreams of a life of prosperity. When he learns that his mother (Sulochana Latkar) has struggled for years to give him the best, he takes a job at Ranjit Rai's (Balraj Sahni) company. His hard work pays off and he is able to earn the trust of his boss and get promoted to a good post. On a vacation with his friend Lachchu (O. P. Ralhan), he falls in love with the village beauty Gauri (Sharmila Tagore) and promises her father (D.K. Sapru) that he will return in a month's time to marry her. But things get complicated when he returns to the city and Raj's boss (Balraj Sahni) wants Raj to marry his daughter or perhaps lose his job. In climax, it reveals that Gauri and Madhu are one person and Madhu wanted to test her partner for loving her and not marrying her for her father's money.

== Cast ==
- Rajendra Kumar as Raj Kumar 'Raju'
- Sharmila Tagore as Madhu Rai / Gauri
- O. P. Ralhan as Lachchu
- Balraj Sahni as Ranjit Rai / Raj's Boss
- Helen as Rita
- Sulochana Latkar as Raj Kumar's Mother (as Sulochana)
- Pandit Ram Marathe as the classical singer in song 'Tere naina talash kare'
- Sajjan as Dice / Albert (Rita's Father)
- Jeevan as John
- Hari Shivdasani as Babulal (Lachchu's Father)
- Madan Puri as Peter
- D.K. Sapru as Gauri's Father (as Sapru)
- Tun Tun as Kamini
- Randhir hotel manager
- Jayshree T. as dancer in black in Song "Aaj Ko Junli Raat Maa"

== Soundtrack ==
The music of this film was composed by S. D. Burman and penned by Majrooh Sultanpuri. This album has various kinds of hits, starting from the very romantic 'Palkon Ke Peechhe Se' to the sentimental 'Meri Duniya Hai Maa Tere Aanchal Mein'. It even covers the Indian classical-based number 'Tere Naina Talash Karen' to the sensational cabaret dance by Helen called 'Kar Le Pyar'.

Talash

Soundtrack album by S. D. Burman
- Released: 1969
- Genre: Feature film soundtrack
- Label: HMV

S. D. Burman chronology
Jewel Thief (1967)	Talash (1969)	Aradhana (1969)

The song "Aaj Ko Junli Raat Maa" samples the Romance theme from the Lieutenant Kijé Suite by Russian composer Sergei Prokofiev.

All lyrics are written by Majrooh Sultanpuri; all music is composed by S. D. Burman.

No.	Title	Singer(s)	Length
1.	"Palkon Ke Peechhe Se" (Romantic duet)	Lata Mangeshkar; Mohd. Rafi	4:43
2.	"Kar Le Pyar" (Sensational cabaret)	Asha Bhosle	5:24
3.	"Tere Naina Talash Karen" (Raga Chayanat)	Manna Dey	4:51
4.	"Khayi Hai Re Humne Kasam" (Raag Barwa)	Lata Mangeshkar	4:11
5.	"Meri Duniya Hai Maa Tere Aanchal Mein"	S. D. Burman	3:38
6.	"Kitni Akeli"	Lata Mangeshkar	3:32
7.	"Aaj Ko Junli Raat Maa"	Lata Mangeshkar; Mohd. Rafi	6:59
8.	"Mera Kya Sanam"	Mahendra Kapoor; Asha Bhosle	4:53
