= Paapi =

1977 film by O. P. Ralhan

- Directed by: O. P. Ralhan
- Written by: O. P. Ralhan
- Produced by: O. P. Ralhan
- Starring: Sunil Dutt; Sanjeev Kumar; Zeenat Aman; Reena Roy
- Music by: Bappi Lahiri
- Release date: 1977
- Country: India
- Language: Hindi

Paapi is a 1977 Bollywood film directed by O. P. Ralhan. The film stars Sunil Dutt, Sanjeev Kumar, Zeenat Aman, Reena Roy in lead roles. The music was composed by Bappi Lahiri. The film was successful at the box office.

== Cast ==
- Sunil Dutt as Inspector Raj Kumar
- Sanjeev Kumar as Dr. Ashok Roy
- Zeenat Aman as Rano / Rani / Vanita Kapoor
- Reena Roy as Asha
- Amrish Puri as Vikram's boss voice dubbing
- Prem Chopra as Vikram
- Padma Khanna as Kitty
- Madan Puri as Harnamdas
- Iftekhar as Police Inspector
- Durga Khote as Ashok's Mother
- Jagdish Raj as Inspector Bhaskar
- O. P. Ralhan as Rocky
- Alka as Dolly D'Costa
- Moolchand as W. C. D'Costa railway guard
- Tun Tun as Laila
- Danny Denzongpa as Abdul
- Hina Kausar as Sita
- Manmohan Krishna as
- Kamal Kapoor as Banke / boss Michael
- Rajan Kapoor as
- Kamaldeep as
- Baby Deepa as
- Master Vikas as
- Ratan Gaurang as
- Jawahar Kaul as
- Nana Palsikar as Seth Ghanshyam Das
- Sudhir as
- Randhir Kapoor Sr. as party guest

== Soundtrack ==
Song	Singer
"Aa Jaan-E-Jaan"	Lata Mangeshkar
"Bol Sajna Mujhe"	Lata Mangeshkar
"Pyar Hai Gunah Suno"	Lata Mangeshkar
"Shama Jale Ya Na Jale"	Lata Mangeshkar
"Kaisa Hai Naseeb Tera"	Mohammed Rafi
"Bolo Bolo Re Bhaiya"	Mahendra Kapoor
