= Jaali Note =

1960 film by Shakti Samanta

- Theatrical release poster
- Directed by: Shakti Samanta
- Screenplay by: Ranjan Bose
- Produced by: Sant Singh and Pachhi was brother of Om Prakash
- Starring: Dev Anand; Madhubala
- Music by: O. P. Nayyar; Raja Mehdi Ali Khan (lyrics)
- Release date: 25 November 1960
- Running time: 155 minutes
- Country: India
- Language: Hindi

Jaali Note (transl. "Fake Currency") is a 1960 Hindi-language crime film directed by Shakti Samanta, based on the theme of counterfeit money. It stars Dev Anand and Madhubala, along with Helen, Madan Puri, Om Prakash.

The film emerged as one of the biggest commercial successes of the year. Its popularity was further escalated by its soundtrack (composed by O. P. Nayyar), of which many songs turned out to be chartbusters.

== Plot ==
Dinesh (Dev Anand) lives a middle-class lifestyle with his mother in Bombay. On his fifth birthday, his father left them never to return.

Now, Inspector Dinesh has grown up, is working for the Criminal Investigations Department, and has been assigned to stop the circulation of fake currency notes. His investigations take him to Sunderdas, who is killed. He then masquerades as social worker Abdul Rashid to try to get some information from a jailed convict, Banwarilal, to no avail. Finally, he dons the disguise of wealthy Kunver Vijay Bahadur, rents a suite in Hotel Paris and befriends Manohar (Madan Puri) and several other gangsters. He gets arrested and lodged in the same cell as Banwarilal. From there, the men break out and join Manohar and the rest of the gang.

It is here that Dinesh will find out the king-pin behind the racket. But before he can do anything, he finds himself confronting his past and will be trapped in an underwater fortress with his sweetheart, press reporter Renu (Madhubala).

== Cast ==
- Dev Anand as C.I.D. Inspector Dinesh / Prince Vijay Bahadur / Abdul Rashid
- Madhubala as Renu / Beena
- Helen as Lily
- Madan Puri as Manohar
- Om Prakash as C.I.D. Constable Pandu / Nandlal
- Tun Tun as Mrs. Malik
- Bipin Gupta as Rai Bahadur / Boss (Dinesh's Father)
- Mridula Rani as Shobha (Dinesh's Mother)

== Soundtrack ==
Jaali Note

Soundtrack album by O. P. Nayyar
- Released: 1960
- Genre: Feature film soundtrack
- Length: 26:00
- Language: Hindi
- Label: Saregama
- Producer: O. P. Nayyar

All lyrics are written by Raja Mehdi Ali Khan; all music is composed by O. P. Nayyar.

Songs
No.	Title	Singer(s)	Length
1.	"Mister Dil Badi Mushkil Men Tune Aaj Dala"	Asha Bhosle and Mohammed Rafi	3:31
2.	"Gustakh Nazar Chehre Se Hata"	Asha Bhosle and Mohammed Rafi	2:50
3.	"Chhuri Ban Kanta Ban O My Son"	Mohammed Rafi	3:19
4.	"Dil Hai Aapka Huzoor Lijiye"	Asha Bhosle and Mohammed Rafi	3:09
5.	"Idhar Dekho Mera Dil"	Asha Bhosle and Shamshad Begum	3:21
6.	"Nigahon Ne Phenka Panje Pe Chhakka"	Asha Bhosle and Mohammed Rafi	3:18
7.	"Raat Sard Sard Hain"	Asha Bhosle and Mohammed Rafi	3:18
8.	"Sach Kehta Hoon Bahut Hasin Ho"	Asha Bhosle and Mohammed Rafi	3:32
Total length:			26:00

== Release ==
The film was released in Bombay on 25 November 1960.

== Reception ==
=== Box office ===
Jaali Note was a box office success. In Samanta's words, the film "did quite well" and was financially profitable.

1960 was a particularly successful year for Madhubala, who starred in three consecutive box-office hits: Mughal-e-Azam, Jaali Note and Barsaat Ki Raat.

=== Critical reception ===
A Times of India review, dated 27 November 1960, carried the headline: "Jaali Note Redeemed By Good Performances And Catchy Music".

The film's music was well received by critics and audience.

In a 2019 retrospective review, critic Karan Bali criticised the film's screenplay, describing it as "yet another urban crime thriller" from classic Hindi cinema. Although he praised O. P. Nayyar's musical score, Bali remarked that the film had "dated badly" despite its box-office success.

== Trivia ==
- Like in many other films, in this also you can see Dev Anand playing cards in bar.
- The car in which Madhubala is kidnapped and taken to Manohar's den, has old 'J&K' number plate, very rarely seen.
