= Phool Aur Patthar =

1966 Indian romantic drama film

- Poster
- Directed by: O. P. Ralhan
- Written by: Ahsan Rizvi (dialogues)
- Screenplay by: O. P. Ralhan
- Story by: Akhtar ul Iman; O. P. Ralhan
- Produced by: O. P. Ralhan
- Starring: Meena Kumari; Dharmendra; Shashikala; O. P. Ralhan
- Cinematography: Nariman Irani
- Edited by: Vasant Borkar
- Music by: Ravi
- Release date: August 14, 1966
- Country: India
- Language: Hindi
- Budget: 65 lakh
- Box office: 32 Crore with overseas collection

Phool Aur Patthar (transl. The Flower and The Rock) is a 1966 Indian Hindi-language romantic drama film directed and produced by O. P. Ralhan, and written by Akhtar ul Iman and Ahsan Rizvi. It stars Meena Kumari and Dharmendra in lead roles. Shashikala, Lalita Pawar, Madan Puri, and Iftekhar played the supporting roles.

The film was a blockbuster and one of the highest-grossing film of 1966. It was also a turning point for Dharmendra's career. After Raj Kapoor, Dharamendra became the second Indian actor to become hugely popular in Soviet Union countries and Warsaw Countries after the film's success. Dharmendra and Meena Kumari's on-screen chemistry garnered immense popularity. Later, they worked together in other films such as Chandan Ka Palna, Majhli Didi, and Baharon Ki Manzil.

The film was remade in Tamil as Oli Vilakku with M. G. Ramachandran, in Telugu as Nindu Manasulu with N. T. Ramarao, and in Malayalam as Puthiya Velicham with Jayan.

== Plot ==
Circumstances have made Shaka a career criminal. When plague empties a town of its inhabitants, he takes the opportunity to burgle a house. He finds nothing except Shanti, a widowed daughter-in-law who has been left to die by her cruel relatives. Shaka nurses her back to health. When her relatives return, they are not pleased to find her alive and even less pleased to discover that someone has tried to rob them. Shanti gets the blame and a beating. Shaka saves her from worse, at the hands of brother-in-law, and the pair flee. They set up home in Shaka's house, much to the displeasure of the respectable neighbours, who are all too ready to think the worst. Shanti's relatives are dismayed when a lawyer arrives to announce that Shanti has been left a legacy. They hatch a plot to get her back. Meanwhile, Shaka's rehabilitation is proceeding - much to the chagrin of his former criminal associates. Fire and redemption for some, death and handcuffs for others is what fate has in store.

== Cast ==
- Meena Kumari as Shanti Devi
- Dharmendra as Shakti Singh / Shaaka
- Shashikala as Rita
- Lalita Pawar as Mrs. Jeevan Ram
- Sunder as Dr. Alopinath - Vaidraj
- Jeevan as Jeevan Ram
- Ram Mohan as Kalicharan (as Rammohan)
- Manmohan Krishna as Police Inspector
- Madan Puri as John - Boss (as Madanpuri)
- Tun Tun as Mrs. Alopinath (Guddki) (as Tuntun)
- Leela Chitnis as Blind Beggar
- Iftekhar as Babu (as Iftikhar)
- D.K. Sapru as Judge (as Sapru)
- Paul Sharma as Paul
- Johnny Whisky
- Mauji Singh as in the crowd Sikh man (uncredited )
- Shyam Ralhan (uncredited ) real brother of O.P Ralhan
- Braham Bhardwaj as Public Prosecutor (as Braham Bharadwaj)
- Jayshree T. at Jewellery shop (uncredited)
- Baby Farida as Jumni
- Master Aziz as Bablu
- Ram Avtar as Fat Pickpocket
- Bhairon as Daboo - the dog (as Famous Dog Bhairon)
- O. P. Ralhan as Sadakram
- Indira Billi as
- Bhariron as Daboo (the dog)

== Soundtrack ==
Phool Aur Patthar

Soundtrack album by Ravi
- Released: 1966
- Genre: Feature film soundtrack
- Language: Hindi
- Label: Angel Records

The soundtrack was composed by Ravi and lyrics by Shakeel Badayuni.

Song	Singer(s)	Notes
"Sheeshe Se Pee Ya"	Asha Bhosle	Picturized on Shashikala
"Sun Le Pukar"	Asha Bhosle	
"Zindagi Mein Pyar Karna"	Asha Bhosle	Picturized on Shashikala
"Mere Dil Ke Andar"	Mohammad Rafi	This song is a qawwali.
"Layi Hai Hazaron Rang"	Asha Bhosle	Laxmi Chhaya one of the dancers featured in this song.
"Tum Kaun? Mamul"	Mohammad Rafi	

== Production ==
Sunil Dutt was initially offered Dharmendra's role but declined it due to concerns about the slightly scandalous nature of the story. He felt that the character did not align with his on-screen image and was uncertain about the film’s box-office prospects.

== Box office ==
Phool Aur Patthar estimated worldwide box office – ₹171.7 million ($24.68 million) – 91.4 million ticket sales

- India (1966) – ₹75 million ($11.79 million) – 45 million ticket sales (Note: See List of highest-grossing films in India § Highest-grossing films by year)
- Soviet Union (1970) – 11.6 million Rbls (Note: 46.4 million Soviet tickets sold, average ticket price of 25 kopecks) ($12.89 million, (Note: 0.9 Rbl per US dollar from 1961 to 1971) ₹96.7 million) (Note: 7.5 Indian rupees per US dollar from 1967 to 1970) – 46.4 million ticket sales

The film also collected 3.4 Crore INR during the re-runs in the mid 1970s in India boosting the box office collections to further 21 Crore INR worldwide.

== Awards ==
14th Filmfare Awards

- Best Art Director - Color - Shanti Dass (Won)
- Best Editor - Vasant Borkar (Won)
- Best Actor - Dharmendra (Nominated)
- Best Actress - Meena Kumari (Nominated)
- Best Supporting Actress - Shashikala (Nominated)
