= Nadaan (1971 film) =

1971 film by Deven Verma

- Directed by: Deven Verma
- Written by: Akhtar-UL-Iman
- Produced by: Deven Verma
- Starring: Asha Parekh; Madan Puri; Navin Nischal
- Cinematography: Anwar Siraj
- Edited by: Subhash Gupta
- Music by: Shankar Jaikishan
- Release date: 1971
- Running time: 2 hours 36 min
- Country: India
- Language: Hindi

Nadaan (Hindi: नादान; translated: innocent) is a 1971 Bollywood drama film directed by Deven Verma. The film stars Asha Parekh, Navin Nischal, Helen and Madan Puri.

== Cast ==
- Asha Parekh - Seema
- A. K. Hangal - Seema's Father
- Brahm Bhardwaj - Ramprasad Jain
- Sulochana Chatterjee - Mrs. Sarla Jain
- Navin Nischal - Ajay Jain
- Helen - Rita Saxena
- Praveen Paul - Mrs. Saxena
- Madan Puri - Mangu
- Nirupa Roy - Ranimaa alias Ranjana
- Asit Sen - Bhola Shankar
- M. B. Shetty - Gunga Pahelwan
- Sunder - Sunder Lal
- Deven Verma - Lawyer Vicky
- Jairaj - Jailor
- Rashid Khan - Balbir Singh's Servant
- Ravikant - Birju
- Subroto Mahapatra - Seema's Servant
- Ratan Gaurang - Blanket Store Employee
- Bela Bose
- Karan Dewan

== Crew ==
- Director - Deven Verma
- Screenplay - Deven Verma
- Dialogue - Akhtar-Ul-Iman
- Producer - Deven Verma
- Editor - Subhash Gupta, Khan Zaman Khan
- Cinematographer - Anwar Siraj
- Art Director - K. Baburao, S. S. Sharma (assistant)
- Production Manager - M. Hasan Ali Siddique
- Assistant Director - Aijaz Ali, Prem Kamath
- Assistant Cameraman - Rohington Behramsha, Clyde Chai-Fa, Parvez M. Irani, Vijay Hangal (stills)
- Stuntman - M. B. Shetty, Surendra Shetty, Balram (assistant)
- Choreographer - Surya Kumar, Badri Prasad
- Original Music - Shankar–Jaikishan
- Music Assistant - Sebastian D'Souza, Dattaram Wadkar
- Lyricist - Hasrat Jaipuri
- Playback Singers - Mukesh, Asha Bhosle

== Music ==
Song title	Singers	Time
"Ae Badal Jhoom Ke Chal"	Mukesh	4:44
"Bol Nadaan Dil"	Asha Bhosle	4:05
"Chubh Gai Karejwa Mein Nainwa"	Asha Bhosle	4:58
"Jeevan Bhar Dhoondha Jisko"	Mukesh	5:29
"Mehnat Humara Jeevan"	Mukesh	4:57
"Naach Ae Dil Gaa Ae Dil"	Asha Bhosle	4:23
