= Gunahon Ka Devta (1967 film) =

- Theatrical release poster
- Directed by: Devi Sharma
- Written by: Sarshar Sailani (dialogues); Hasrat Jaipuri; Shailendra (lyrics)
- Screenplay by: Ravi Kapoor
- Story by: Devi Sharma
- Produced by: Devi Sharma
- Starring: Jeetendra; Rajshree
- Cinematography: V. Durga Prasad
- Edited by: Dharamvir
- Music by: Shankar Jaikishan
- Production company: Janta Chitra
- Release date: 19 May 1967
- Running time: 150 minutes
- Country: India
- Language: Hindi

Gunahon Ka Devta (transl. Deity of the Sins) is a 1967 Hindi-language drama film, produced and directed by Devi Sharma under the Janta Chitra banner. It stars Jeetendra, Rajshree and music composed by Shankar Jaikishan.

== Plot ==
Kundan is a vagabond with a golden heart. He dissipates money for it and makes debt from a loan shark, Lala Hakumat Rai. Once, Kundan is acquainted with a spitfire girl named Kesar in a dispute and falls for her. So, he sends his mother with the marriage proposal when Kundan's debaucher nature mortifies her. Parallelly, Lala keeps an evil eye on Kesar and conspires to knit her. Just before the wedding, Kundan rescues her and poses themselves as a man & wife under compulsion when Kundan's family also gives a warm welcome. However, Kundan is notified that Kesar is already in love. So, he promises to protect her until his return and requests to maintain secrecy. Spotting the agony of Kundan's mother, Kesar tries to reform him but, unfortunately, loses her eyesight. During that plight, Kundan mortgages his house at Lala and recoups her vision. Exploiting it, Lala makes their life miserable by seizing Kundan's house and indicting him for a false allegation, etc. Hence, Kesar approaches Lala with mutual consent to espousal, provided he retrieves Kundan's property and acquits him, for which he does so. Soon after, Kundan learns that he is Kesar's beau who lied to change him. At last, the two make a play and cease Lala. Finally, the movie ends on a happy note with the marriage of Kundan & Kesar.

== Cast ==
- Jeetendra
- Rajshree
- Mehmood
- Randhir
- Asit Sen
- Jankidas
- Jeevan
- Leela Chitnis
- Aruna Irani
- Sujata Rubener
- Tun Tun
- Farida

== Soundtrack ==
#	Title	Singer(s)
1	"Gunahon Ka Devta"	Mukesh
2	"Hum Ko To Bardbad Kiya"	Mohammed Rafi
3	"Main Marne Chala Hoon"	Mohammed Rafi, Mehmood
4	"Mehfil Mein Shama Chamkegi"	Mohammed Rafi, Manna Dey
5	"Ram Kare Kahin Naina"	Lata Mangeshkar
6	"Tere Aankhon Ke"	Mukesh
7	"Humko to Barbad Kiya hai"	Sharda
