= Bandhe Haath =

1973 film by O.P. Goyle

Bandhe Hath
- Directed by: O. P. Goyle
- Written by: Qamar Jalalabadi; O. P. Ralhan
- Produced by: O. P. Ralhan
- Starring: Amitabh Bachchan; Mumtaz
- Cinematography: Rajendra Malone
- Edited by: Vasant Borkar
- Music by: R. D. Burman
- Distributed by: Ralhan Productions Pvt. Ltd.
- Release date: 16 February 1973
- Running time: 137 minutes
- Country: India
- Language: Hindi

Bandhe Hath (English: Tied Hands) is a 1973 Hindi-language film produced and written by O. P. Ralhan, and directed by O. P. Goyle. It stars Amitabh Bachchan, Mumtaz in lead roles, with Ajit, Ranjeet, Madan Puri, Asit Sen, O. P. Ralhan, Tun Tun, Pinchoo Kapoor in supporting roles.

Upon release, Bandhe Haath found no takers, but with Bachchan emerging as a star later that year with Zanjeer, it saw renewed interest among audiences and went on to recover its cost to emerge as an "average" fare.

== Synopsis ==
A thief named Shyamu who has made stealing his career decides to go straight after the death of his mentor. On the run from police for committing a series of robberies in the past, he ends up in a village and he comes across a poet named Deepak and comes to his aid. Taking advantage of the fact that Deepak is his lookalike he decides to steal his identity by killing him. However, he backs out of killing him when he discovers Deepak is already dying of an illness. After Deepak's death he decides to steal his identity and informs the police that Deepak is actually the thief Shyamu. However a police inspector becomes suspicious that Shyamu is actually alive and masquerading as the poet Deepak.

The change in the life of now Deepak the poet, from Shyamu, is due to a stage artist and dancer, Mala, who is exquisitely beautiful, as a woman and human being, and who falls in love with him, being part of the same stage company, Roop Kala Theatre. For her, he wants to finish his old identity fully, but finds out that Deepak had a love interest in Rajni, who is a women's rights activist and daughter of the same multi millionaire, Seth Harnaam Das, in whose house, he as Shyamu the thief, had committed his last robbery, but had returned all the stolen articles to the police, except for a ring which he had gifted to Mala. He wants to retrieve the letters from Rajni, which Deepak had written to her, for fear, that the police will conduct a handwriting test on him with them, and woos Rajni. Mala is taken aback when she finds out the same, as also the real identity of now Deepak the poet, from Inspector Kumar.

== Cast ==
- Amitabh Bachchan in a dual role as:
  - Shyamu
  - Deepak
- Mumtaz as Mala
- Ajit as Inspector Kumar
- Ranjeet as Ranjeet
- Madan Puri as Shyamu's Mentor
- Gajanan Jagirdar as Seth Harnamdas
- Kumud Chuggani as Rajni
- Anjana Mumtaz as Kamla
- O. P. Ralhan as Preetam
- Tun Tun as Kavita
- Sardar Akhtar as Mala's Mother
- Rammohan Sharma as Inspector Bedi
- Asit Sen as Roopkala Theatre Owner
- Pinchoo Kapoor as Doctor

== Soundtrack ==
The music was composed by R. D. Burman and the lyrics were penned by Majrooh Sultanpuri.

Song	Singer	Duration
"Yeh Mere Bandhe Hath"	Kishore Kumar	4:27
"Yeh Kaun Aaj Aaya"	Lata Mangeshkar	4:58
"Tune Chheen Liya"	Lata Mangeshkar	4:59
"Chhalla Mere Chhaila Ne"	Lata Mangeshkar	6:24
"O Majhi Re Jayen Kahan"	Asha Bhosle	6:13
"Dil To Lai Gawa, Ab Ka Hoga Re, Dhokha Dai Gawa, Ab Ka Hoga Re"	Asha Bhosle, R. D. Burman, Manna Dey, Mahendra Kapoor	8:40
