= Pyaas (1982 film) =

- Directed by: O. P. Ralhan
- Starring: Zeenat Aman
- Music by: Bappi Lahiri
- Release date: 1982
- Country: India
- Language: Hindi

Pyaas (transl. Thirst) is a 1982 Bollywood film directed by O. P. Ralhan.

== Cast ==
- Zeenat Aman
- Kanwaljit Singh
- Tanuja
- Mac Mohan
- O. P. Ralhan
- Madan Puri
- Anju Mahendru
- Dheeraj Kumar
- Manmohan Krishna
- Kamini Kaushal

== Soundtrack ==
No.	Title	Singer(s)	Length
1.	"Saath Mera"	Kishore Kumar
2.	"Phool Chahiye" (Sad)	Kishore Kumar
3.	"Phool Chahiye"	Kishore Kumar; Manna Dey
4.	"Om Namah Shivay" (Male version)	Kishore Kumar; Amit Kumar
5.	"Om Namah Shivay" (Female version)	Asha Bhosle
6.	"Raat Sone Ko Hai"	Asha Bhosle
7.	"Mera Dil Tera Dil"	Asha Bhosle
8.	"Hamari Yaad Ki"	Mahendra Kapoor
9.	"Dard Ki Raagini (Raga Abhogi)"	Lata Mangeshkar
