= Phir Bhi =

- Poster
- Directed by: Shivendra Sinha
- Starring: Partap Sharma and Urmila Bhatt
- Release date: 1971
- Country: India
- Language: Hindi

Phir Bhi (lit. 'Nevertheless') is a 1971 Bollywood drama film directed by Shivendra Sinha. The film stars Partap Sharma and Urmila Bhatt. Partap Sharma won the 1971 National Award for the lead role in this feature film which also won the National Film Award for Best Feature Film in Hindi.

== Cast ==
- Partap Sharma
- Urmila Bhatt
- Meenal Mehta
- Rajeshwar Nath
- Bimbi
- Deven Shrivastav

== Music ==
1. "Ham Chaahen Ya Na Chaahen Hamraahi Bana Leti Hain" – Hemant Kumar
2. "Kyon Pyaala Chhalakta Hai Kyon Deepak Jalta Hai" – Manna Dey
3. "Saanjh Khile Bhor Jhar Phool Har Singaar Ke" – Hemant Kumar, Ranu Mukherjee
