= Woh Din Yaad Karo =

- Directed by: K. Amarnath
- Starring: Sanjay Khan and Nanda
- Music by: Laxmikant–Pyarelal
- Release date: 1971
- Country: India
- Language: Hindi

Woh Din Yaad Karo is a 1971 Bollywood family drama film directed by K. Amarnath. The film stars Sanjay Khan and Nanda.

== Cast ==
- Sanjay Khan ... Ajay / Raja
- Nanda ... Tara
- Shashikala ... Rajkumari / Saroj
- Mehmood ... Pyarelal / Kalluram / Nachappa
- Tun Tun as Chandabai
- Madan Puri as Madan
- Wasti as Jamnadas
- Dhumal as Dularis' father/Advocate
- Rajan Haksar as Gupta
- Malika as dulari
- Murad as Major/ Tara's father

== Soundtrack ==
The music was composed by Laxmikant–Pyarelal while the lyrics were penned by Anand Bakshi

1. "Hoy Aasmaan Se Tod Ke Taare Zulf Mein Teri" – Kishore Kumar, Sulakshana Pandit
2. "Maine Chand Dekha Hai" – Mohammed Rafi
3. "Yaar Jinhe Tum Bhul Gaye Ho (Male)" – Mohammed Rafi
4. "Yaar Jinhe Tum Bhul Gaye Ho (Female)" – Lata Mangeshkar
5. "Mohabbat Ki Kahaniyan" – Talat Mahmood, Lata Mangeshkar
6. "Baitha Bairi Banke Saiyyan" – Mohammed Rafi, Suman Kalyanpur
