= Ganga Ki Lahren =

- Poster
- Directed by: Devi Sharma
- Screenplay by: Devi Sharma; Sarshar Sailani (dialogue)
- Story by: Devi Sharma
- Produced by: Devi Sharma
- Starring: Kishore Kumar; Aruna Irani; Dharmendra; Savitri
- Cinematography: Keki Mistry
- Edited by: Dharam Vir
- Music by: Chitragupt; Majrooh Sultanpuri (lyrics)
- Release date: 1964
- Country: India
- Language: Hindi

Ganga Ki Lahren (transl. The waves of Ganga) is a 1964 Hindi drama film produced and directed by Devi Sharma. The film stars Kishore Kumar, Dharmendra, Savitri, Aruna Irani, Rehman and Asit Sen. The music of the film is by Chitragupt, with lyrics by Majrooh Sultanpuri, featuring songs like "Ganga Ki Lahren".

== Cast ==
- Dharmendra as Ashok
- Savitri as Seema
- Aruna Irani as Neeta
- Kishore Kumar as Kishore
- Nasir Hussain as Diwan Saab(Ashok's father)
- Rehman as Dr. Balraj
- Kumkum as Uma Devi
- Asit Sen as Ram Lakhan
- Tun Tun as Kishore s maid
- Mridula Rani as Dr Balraj's mother
- Hari Shivdasani as Laxmidas(Kishore's father)
- Brahm Bhardwaj as Thakur
- Master Shahid as Munna
- Azra as Ragini(Neeta's elder sister)

== Soundtrack ==
1. "Ganga Ki Lahren" – Kishore Kumar, Lata Mangeshkar
2. "Chhedo Na Meri Zulfen Sab Log Kyaa Kahenge" – Kishore Kumar, Lata Mangeshkar
3. "Ae Janeman Hans Lo Zara" – Kishore Kumar
4. "Jay Jay He Jagdambe Mata" – Lata Mangeshkar
5. "Shama Bujhane Ko Chalee" – Mohammed Rafi
6. "Ek Paise Ka Hai Sawal" – Usha Mangeshkar
7. "Bairi Bichhua Bada Dukh De" – Lata Mangeshkar
8. "Dekho Re Koi Kaminiya" – Asha Bhosle
