= Shri Krishna Leela =

- Directed by: Homi Wadia
- Written by: Bharat Vyas
- Screenplay by: Homi Wadia
- Story by: S. N. Tripathi
- Based on: Lord Krishna
- Produced by: Homi Wadia
- Starring: Sachin; Hina; Jayshree Gadkar; Sapru
- Cinematography: Anant Wadedakar
- Edited by: Shaikh Ismail
- Music by: S. N. Tripathi
- Production company: Basant Pictures
- Release date: 15 January 1971
- Running time: 131 min
- Country: India
- Language: Hindi

Shri Krishna Leela is a 1971 Hindi religious film directed by Homi Wadia. It was produced by his Basant Pictures banner. Written by B. M. Vyas, the story and dialogue were by S. N. Tripathi. The music was composed by S. N. Tripathi and had lyrics by B. M. Vyas. The film starred Sachin, Hina, Jayshree Gadkar, Sapru, Manhar Desai and Tabassum. The film was dubbed into Malayalam as Sree Krishnaleela.

The film tells the story of Lord Krishna in his childhood form, from his birth to the killing of his uncle, Raja Kansa.

== Plot ==
Raja Kansa (Sapru) has been told by an oracle that he will be killed by the eighth male child born to his sister Devaki (Padmarani). He has Devaki and her husband Vasudeva imprisoned and kills off all the children born to them. When the eighth child, a boy, is born, Vasudev manages to leave him with Nanda and Yashoda, who become his foster parents. The film shows some miracles with the ogress and serpents. It also focuses on Radha Krishna's love story. The film ends with a wrestling match between the boy Krishna and a wrestler, which Krishna wins, and his killing of Raja Kansa. Krishna frees his parents from the prison.

== Cast ==
- Sachin as Krishna
- Hina as Radha
- Jayshree Gadkar as Yashoda
- Sapru as Raja Kans
- Manhar Desai
- Dighe
- Tabassum as Rasili
- Ratnamala
- Deepak
- Padmarani as Devaki
- Uma Dutt
- Shekhar Purohit
- Tun Tun
- Dalpat
- Habib as Kaalia

== Music ==
The music director was S. N. Tripathi with lyrics written by B. M. Vyas. The playback singing was given by Asha Bhosle, Manna Dey, Dolly Davjekar, Sunil and Usha Timothy.

=== Song list ===
#	Title	Singer
1	"Sharad Poonam Ki Suhani Rat"	Asha Bhosle
2	"Haathi Ghoda Palki"	Asha Bhosle, Doly Davjekar, Sunil
3	"Naari Ek Doosri Dharti Aut Tisari Gaiya"	Usha Timothy, Asha Bhosle
4	"Chandra Chhupaa Suraj Ugaa"	Asha Bhosle
5	"Palkon Ka Palna Naino Ki Dori"	Asha Bhosle
6	"Satyam Shivam Sundaram"	Manna Dey
7	"Tera Panth Nihar Kanhaiya"	Asha Bhosle
