= Pyaar Ka Saagar =

1961 film by Devendra Goel

- Directed by: Devendra Goel
- Written by: S. Nasiruddin Daroghaji; Ehsan Rizvi; Dhruva Chatterjee; Devendra Goel; Vrajendra Gaur; Vishnu Mehrotra
- Produced by: Filmrays Productions
- Starring: Rajendra Kumar; Meena Kumari; Madan Puri; O. P. Ralhan
- Edited by: R.V. Shrikhande
- Music by: Ravi
- Release date: 1961
- Running time: 150 mins
- Language: Hindi

Pyaar Ka Saagar (transl. Ocean of Love) is a 1961 Indian Hindi-language film starring Rajendra Kumar, Meena Kumari and Madan Puri in lead roles. The film is directed by Devendra Goel and its music is given by Ravi.

== Plot ==
After the passing of their parents Bishen Chand Gupta takes it upon himself to raise his younger brother, Kishen. He arranges for his education. While Kishen is holidaying in Mahabaleshwar, the bus they are traveling in, breaks down due to a storm, and the passengers are stranded. Kishen comes to the assistance of fellow-passenger, Radha, and both eventually and passionately fall in love with each other. As Radha's birthday is on the 20th of that month, Kishen purchases a statuette of Lord Kishan and Goddess Radha, symbolizing their love for each other, as a present for Radha. It is then her Bua tells him that Radha has been married. A shocked and devastated Kishen falls down the stairs, is injured, and loses his vision. He recuperates and goes back to Bombay to live with his brother, who is now married to a woman named Rani. Kishen does not know that Rani is none other than Radha, who is refusing to reveal her real name to Kishen. Watch what happens when Bishen asks her to convince Kishen to undergo eye surgery to restore his vision. Will Radha convince him, and if he regains his sight, how will the two adjust to living under the same roof?

== Cast ==
- Rajendra Kumar as Kishanchand Gupta
- Meena Kumari as Radha / Rani Gupta
- Madan Puri as Bishanchand Gupta
- O. P. Ralhan as Ramesh
- Malika as Sheela Sangram Singh
- Mohan Choti as Sheela's Cousin
- Leela Mishra as Radha's Aunty
- Jagdish Raj as Dr. Cooper (Eye Surgeon)

== Crew ==
- Director – Devendra Goel
- Producer – Filmrays Productions
- Story – S. Nasiruddin Daroghaji
- Screenplay – Dhruva Chatterjee
- Dialogues – S. Nasiruddin Daroghaji, Vrajendra Gaur, Vishnu Mehrotra, Devendra Goel, Ehsan Rizvi
- Photography – Pandurang Naik
- Music – Ravi
- Lyrics – Prem Dhawan, Asad Bhopali
- Editing – R. V. Shrikhande
- Art Direction – D. Malvankar
- Playback Singers – Asha Bhosle, Mohammed Rafi, Shamshad Begum, Mukesh

== Soundtrack ==
The film had eight songs in it. The music of the film was composed by Ravi. Prem Dhawan and Asad Bhopali wrote the lyrics.

Song	Singer
"Raat Raat Bhar Jaag Jaagkar"	Asha Bhosle
"Haal Dil Ka Sunaye To Kaise"	Asha Bhosle
"Chahe Koi Bandook Dikhaye"	Asha Bhosle
"Tana Dere Na Tani Tum, Tana Dere Na"	Asha Bhosle, Shamshad Begum
"Mujhe Pyar Ki Zindagi Denewale"	Asha Bhosle, Mohammed Rafi
"Pyar Ka Sagar Dekha Hai Kisike Chanchal Nainon Mein"	Asha Bhosle, Mukesh
"Sada Khush Rahe Tu Jafa Karnewale"	Mukesh
"Wafa Jinse Ki, Bewafa Ho Gaye"	Mukesh
