= Saaz Aur Sanam =

- Directed by: J.B.H. Wadia
- Starring: Rekha and Premendra
- Release date: 1971
- Country: India
- Language: Hindi

Saaz Aur Sanam is a 1971 Bollywood romance film directed by J.B.H. Wadia. The film stars Rekha and Premendra.

== Music ==
1. "Ye Meri Bala Jaane Hai Kitne Yahan Gam" – Kishore Kumar
2. "Dil Se Nazar Tak Tere Ujale Baaho Me Aaja Ya Mujhko Bula Le" – Kishore Kumar
3. "Na Rootho Hume Paas Aane Bhi Do, Chalo Hum Gunhegar Jaane Bhi Do" – Lata Mangeshkar
4. "Yeh Dil Jigar Jafaa Wafaa Hai Sab Kuch Fasaana" – Lata Mangeshkar
5. "Pal Pal Botal Chalke, Aankho Se Masti Dhalke" – Asha Bhosle
