= Elaan (1971 film) =

- Directed by: K. Ramanlal
- Produced by: F.C.Mehra
- Starring: Vinod Khanna; Rekha; Vinod Mehra; Madan Puri
- Music by: Shankar–Jaikishan; Lyrics: Hasrat Jaipuri, Farouq Qaiser, Indivar, Varma Malik
- Release date: 1971
- Running time: 144 minutes
- Country: India
- Language: Hindi

Elaan is a 1971 Bollywood Sci-Fi thriller film directed by K. Ramanlal. The film stars Vinod Mehra, Rekha, Vinod Khanna, and Madan Puri. The rights to this film are owned by Shah Rukh Khan's Red Chillies Entertainment.

== Plot ==
Naresh Kumar Saxena lives with his widowed mom and sister Seema. He works as a freelance photographer and journalist. One day he meets with Mala Mehta and her dad, who is the Editor of a Newspaper. Mr. Mehta hires Naresh and assigns him to go to a remote island to investigate and expose some illegal activities there. Naresh goes there in the company of his friend, Shyam. Unfortunately, they are caught by the island guards and Lily tries to convince them to work for the gang. On refusal Naresh is lodged in a cell along with two others, one a scientist and the other is Ram Singh, a hoodlum. The scientist confides in Naresh that he has invented an atomic ring that when inserted in someone's mouth will turn that person invisible, and subsequently passes away. Naresh puts the ring in his mouth, takes off his clothes, turns invisible and escapes. The news of his escape creates waves in the underworld and the Boss and Mr. Verma join forces to find Naresh, kill him, and keep the ring for themselves. For this they send Ram Singh and Lily to Bombay. Naresh and Shyam return to Bombay and are given Police protection. Meanwhile, the goons kill Mr. Mehta. Mala decided to take revenge for her dad's murder and joins the Central Bureau of Investigation (CBI). Naresh and Shyam also start working for the CBI to catch the gang. Shyam identifies Lily in a newspaper ad for a club and they go in disguise to find the truth. The remaining story focuses on Naresh, Shyam and Mala's struggle against Boss, Verma, Ram Singh and the gang.

== Cast ==
- Vinod Mehra as Naresh Kumar Saxena
- Vinod Khanna as Ram Singh
- Rekha as Mala Mehta / Mary
- Rajendra Nath as Shyam
- M. B. Shetty as Boss
- Madan Puri as Mr. Verma
- Jankidas as Professor
- Helen as Lily
- Dulari as Mrs. Saxena (Naresh's mom)
- Brahm Bhardwaj as Mr. Mehta (Mala's dad)
- Birbal as Traffic cop
- Hercules as Wrestler
- Iftekhar as Police Chief
- Rashid Khan as Jockey
- Jagdish Raj as Police Inspector
- Sanjana as Seema Saxena
- Sabeena as Vamp

== Music ==
1. "Jaanab-e-man Salaam Hai, Zarina Mera Naam Hai" - Sharda
2. "Ang Se Ang Laga Le Sanso Me Hai Tufaan" - Lata Mangeshkar
3. "Aapki Raaye Mere Bare Me Kya Hai" - Sharda, Mohammed Rafi
4. "Aath Me Aath Ko Jamaa Karo Usme Dalo Do Pure" - Sharda
5. "Aaj Tumhare Kaan Me Keh Du Mere Dil Me Kya Hai" - Asha Bhosle

== Trivia ==
Naresh uses a unique ring invented by a nuclear scientist, that makes a person invisible.
