= Ramu Ustad =

- Directed by: Mohammed Hussain
- Starring: Madan Puri and Dara Singh
- Release date: 1971
- Country: India
- Language: Hindi

Ramu Ustad is a 1971 Bollywood drama film directed by Mohammed Hussain. The film stars Madan Puri and Dara Singh.

== Cast ==
- Dara Singh as Ramu
- Madan Puri
- Mehmood Jr.
- Jayshree T. as Shaam
- Shah Agha

== Music ==
1. "Hum Toh Tujhse Nain Milake Tere Ho Gaye Re" – Suman Kalyanpur
2. "O Jana Na Yeh Dil Diwana, Are Haan Jana Na" – Suman Kalyanpur
3. "Aaya Kaisa Zamana O Baba Duniya Me Pale" – Mohammed Rafi, Sharda
4. "Piya Piya Piya Mora Man Pyaasa Re" – Suman Kalyanpur
