= Devi Sharma (filmmaker) =

Indian film producer (1921–2010)

Devi Sharma (19 October 1921 – 30 March 2010) was an Indian film writer, producer, and director. Sharma produced and directed numerous Indian films under Janta Chitra. He also wrote scripts and dialogues himself.

== Family ==
He was born in Meerut. He died at the age of 90 in 2010, and is survived by his wife Lily Sharma (born 1924), sons Moses and Aaron, and daughter Rohana. Moses is his eldest son also known as Moshe (Hebrew name), has four children who live in Israel, while he resides in America.

== Filmography ==
- Taxi Stand (1957)
- Kali Topi Lal Rumaal (1959)
- Kawali Ki Raath (1963)
- Ganga Ki Lahren (1965)
- Gunahon Ka Devta (1968)
- Hamara Adhikar (1972)
- Gaal Gulabi Nain Sharabi (1974)

The film Aaj Ka Majnu was under production in 1977 starring Navin Nischol, Rakesh Roshan and introducing Raksha, but production was cancelled due to financial issues. Devi Sharma worked with numerous stars like Dharmendra Jeetendra and gave a break to the cousin of Dev Anand, Vishal Anand in the film *" Hamara Adhikar" His most famous song is from the movie *Ganga Ki Lehren Jaya Jaya Hai Jagdambay Mata which is still sung today as a Bhanjan on many occasions and festivals.
