= Khel Mohabbat Ka =

Khel Mohabbat Ka खेल मोहब्बत का
- Directed by: Satish Duggal
- Written by: Rajendra Krishan
- Screenplay by: C.L. Kavish
- Story by: Rajendra Krishan
- Produced by: Digvijay
- Starring: Farooq Shaikh; Poonam Dhillon
- Cinematography: Sharad Kadwe
- Edited by: Shyam Ramsay
- Music by: M. Hussain; T.N. Mangeshkar; G. Yash
- Release date: 11 December 1986 (India)
- Running time: 1 hour 51 min
- Country: India
- Language: Hindi

Khel Mohabbat Ka is a 1986 Indian Bollywood drama film directed by Satish Duggal and produced by Digvijay. It stars Farooq Shaikh, Shakti Kapoor and Poonam Dhillon in pivotal roles.

== Cast ==
- Farooq Shaikh as Amit Verma
- Poonam Dhillon as Lily / Shyamoli
- Shakti Kapoor as Ranjeet
- Madan Puri as Rehman Khan
- Prema Narayan as Ranjeet's Secretary
- Ramesh Deo as Seth Lala, Lily's Father
- Seema Deo as Shyama, Lily's Mother
- Madhu Malhotra as Chitra
- Birbal as Saxena
- Mehmood Jr. as Parsi Kid
- Asrani
- Shivraj as Vishnu Prasad
- Prema Narayan as Ranjeet's Secretary
- Tun Tun as House Maid
- Saroj Khan as Dancer
- Piloo J. Wadia as Parsi Lady
