= Ek Paheli =

1971 film by Naresh Kumar

- Directed by: Naresh Kumar
- Starring: Sanjeev Kumar; Feroz Khan; Tanuja; Madan Puri; Aruna Irani
- Release date: 14 February 1971
- Country: India
- Language: Hindi

Ek Paheli is a 1971 Bollywood thriller drama film directed by Naresh Kumar. The film stars Sanjeev Kumar, Tanuja, Feroz Khan, Madan Puri and Aruna Irani.

== Plot ==
Dr. Sudhir (Feroz Khan) returns from the UK after his father's death to take care of the family business. To decorate an empty section of a room, Sudhir buys an old piano from a local shop. Weird things start happening after he buys the piano. He meets a mysterious woman, Maria (Tanuja), who tells him that while he can play the piano as he is the new owner, he should not let others play it. The first person to play the piano against her advice dies as soon as she has finished playing. Soon, a long time house-servant dies and Dr. Sudhir is a suspect. Complicating the situation is a local businessman Shankarlal (Madan Puri), who is planting false evidence to implicate Sudhir. Sudhir's assistant Rocky (Rajendranath) suspects that Shankarlal is trying to set him up, so he concocts a plan with the police to catch him red-handed. Sudhir's friend and his wife visit him and they record Maria's song and they are shocked to see that the voice wasn't recorded. Sudhir visits Maria's house and while returning he is attacked by Maria's father Joseph (Jeevan). When he regains consciousness, he is at his home and his friends tell him he was in a car accident. He goes back to the spot to retrieve his car where Shankarlal and his secretary Rosy (Aruna Irani) plan to ambush and kill him. Sudhir follows Rosy, who is dressed as Maria. However, Rocky reaches in time with the police and gets Rosy arrested. As she confesses the plot, Shankarlal kills her and flees. He is captured by the police with the help of Sudheer. Sudheer's friend was listening to a record that he bought from the same shop where Sudheer bought the piano. The voice is that of Maria and his friend claims that this is a 20-year-old recording and Maria cannot be a young woman. Sudhir rushes to the music shop to find the owner dead. He goes to Maria's church where he finds out that Maria has been dead for 20 years and her spirit has been haunting the graveyard. She committed suicide because her father sold her favorite piano in exchange of 1 month of free alcohol. Sudhir runs after Maria's spirit and falls from a mountain. He dies and his spirit is united with Maria.

== Cast ==
- Feroz Khan ... Sudhir
- Tanuja ... Maria
- Sanjeev Kumar ... Police Inspector
- Rajendra Nath ... Rocky, Sudhir's Secretary
- Madan Puri ... Shankarlal
- Bipin Gupta ... John, Sudhir's Servant
- Jeevan ... Joseph, Maria's Father
- Aruna Irani ... Rosy
- Tun Tun ... Lily
- B. M. Vyas... Kishen Antique Furniture Shop Owner
- Uma Khosla ... Shobha
- Manohar Deepak

== Music ==
1. "Mai Ek Paheli Hu, Barso Se Akeli Hu" - Suman Kalyanpur
2. "Aansu Ki Ek Boond Hu Mai" (Part 1) - Suman Kalyanpur
3. "Meraa Tumhara Sath Toh Sadiyo Ka Sath Hai" - Mohammed Rafi, Suman Kalyanpur
4. "Ye Raat Ye Jawani, Ye Botal Sharab Ki" - Suman Kalyanpur
5. "Ab To Aaja Dhalne Laage Hai" - Suman Kalyanpur
6. "Oh Darling I Love You" - Mohammed Rafi, Usha Khanna
7. "Aansu Ki Ek Boond Hu Main" (Part 2) - Suman Kalyanpur
