= Ek Raaz =

- Directed by: Shakti Samanta
- Produced by: A. G. Films
- Starring: Kishore Kumar; Jamuna; Lalita Pawar; Pran
- Music by: Chitragupt
- Release date: 1963
- Country: India
- Language: Hindi

Ek Raaz is a 1963 Indian Hindi-language film directed by Shakti Samanta. It stars Kishore Kumar, Jamuna, Lalita Pawar and Pran, and features a soundtrack composed by Chitragupt.

The film premiered at Super Cinema, Bombay, on 10 May 1963. It was described as a "mediocre offering" by a Times of India critic.

According to Shakti Samanta, Ek Raaz marked the launch of Gaffarbhai Nadiadwala's production banner, A. G. Films. The film was commercially successful and strengthened Samanta's association with the Nadiadwala family.

== Cast ==
- Kishore Kumar
- Jamuna
- Lalita Pawar
- Agha
- Mumtaz
- Madan Puri
- Tuntun
- Pran
