= Hulchul (1971 film) =

- Poster
- Directed by: O. P. Ralhan
- Written by: C.J. Pavri; O. P. Ralhan
- Produced by: O. P. Ralhan
- Starring: O. P. Ralhan; Prem Chopra; Helen and Madan Puri
- Cinematography: Rajendra Malone
- Edited by: Vasant Borkar
- Music by: R.D. Burman
- Release date: 1971
- Country: India
- Language: Hindi

Hulchul (transl. Stir) is a 1971 Indian Hindi-language comedy thriller film directed by O. P. Ralhan with himself playing lead role, with Prem Chopra, Helen and Madan Puri among others. Both Zeenat Aman and Kabir Bedi made their acting debuts with the film. This film was remake of Anubavam Pudhumai.

== Plot ==
Peter (O. P. Ralhan) and Kitty (Helen) love each other, but due to Peter's poverty, they are unable to marry each other. One day, during a secret rendezvous, Peter accidentally overhear a conversation between one Mahesh Jetley and his paramour, where Mahesh tells her that he is soon going to bump off his wife on a certain date. Peter and Kitty decide to foil this man's plans. However, there are 2 problems: 1 - They have not seen Mahesh or his paramour's face. 2 - Even if they had, no one would believe their story.

Hence, the lovers decide to do a little investigation on their own. They find three Mahesh Jetleys. On some snooping, they find that each man is married and each of them has a miserable married life. To find their suspect, they devise a plan whereby they will stage an attack on each man's wife. Whoever the culprit is, will freak out and his identity will be revealed.

However, each of their attacks goes awry and they get saved from being arrested each time, just by a whisker. The only positive outcome of this exercise is that they learn that each suspect is actually a man of fidelity. The lives of all the men come on track and love comes back into their lives. All the couples file a complaint in police station to find the culprit trying to break up their marriages.

The Inspector (Raza Murad) investigates all the cases thoroughly and finally nails Peter and Kitty. In a courtroom battle, the public prosecutor (Amrish Puri) claims that the duo tried to break up the marriages to scoop up some money for their own marriage. Peter finally tells the truth to the court. On hearing Peter's story, the public prosecutor asks the court for a half-hour break.

After the break ends, the prosecutor introduces a new witness - Kumar. Then, the prosecutor goes on to play back a tape, and Peter and Kitty are surprised to hear exactly the same conversation that they had heard. The prosecutor surprises the whole court by telling that Kumar is a director who directs plays for radio and that the "conversation" overheard by Peter and Kitty was actually aired on the radio that day.

After discovering the amusing truth behind the whole affair, a bemused judge asks all the Jetley couples to decide the punishment for Peter and Kitty. However, all the couples forgive and thank the duo, as they did what anybody else would have done and that their "crime" has brought three marriages back from the brink of disaster.

After the court is adjourned, Peter and Kitty are being escorted back by police where Peter sees a woman holding a portable radio that is airing the remaining part of Kumar's play. Peter asks the woman to switch off the radio, on which everybody nearby bursts into laughter.

== Cast ==
- O. P. Ralhan as Peter
- Prem Chopra as Mahesh Jetley #1
- Madan Puri as Mahesh Jetley #2
- Kabir Bedi as Mahesh Jetley #3
- Gajanan Jagirdar as Padma's Father
- Ramesh Deo as Dir. Kumar
- Chandrashekhar as Shekhar
- Zeenat Aman as Leena
- Sonia Sahni as Seema
- Helen as Kitty D'Costa
- Anjali Kadam
- Chand Usmani as Shekhar's Wife
- Tun Tun as Philomena D'Costa
- Chandrima Bhaduri as Padma's Mother
- D. K. Sapru as The Judge
- Amrish Puri as Public Prosecutor
- Ram Mohan as Mohan
- Tabassum

== Soundtrack ==
The music of the film was composed by R.D. Burman.

No.	Title	Singer(s)	Length
1.	""Hulchul" (Title Song)"	Asha Bhosle and R.D. Burman
