= Aap Beati =

- Directed by: Mohan Kumar
- Produced by: Mohan Kumar
- Starring: Shashi Kapoor; Hema Malini; Ashok Kumar
- Music by: Laxmikant-Pyarelal
- Release date: 1976
- Country: India
- Language: Hindi

Aap Beati is a 1976 Hindi film. Produced and directed by Mohan Kumar, the film stars Shashi Kapoor, Hema Malini, Ashok Kumar, Nirupa Roy, Premnath, Aruna Irani, Helen, Asrani, Sujit Kumar and Madan Puri. The film's music is by Laxmikant-Pyarelal.

== Plot ==
The Kapoor family consists of Kishorilal, his wife Laajo, son, Prakash, and daughter, Geeta. Kishorilal and Geeta toil hard to ensure that Prakash gets a good education so he can study in America, return home and repay the loans that the family has taken. Prakash does get to complete his studies, he also travels to America, upgrades, and returns home to be employed as Kishorilal's boss. Then Prakash marries Reena, who comes from a wealthy family and moves in with them. Geeta confides in Reena that she has met a young man, Ranjeet, and they love each other and want to marry. The family is overjoyed, but their joy is short-lived when Ranjeet's father, Mayadas asks him to marry the daughter of a wealthy man. When he refuses, he is asked to leave. Reena wants a better lifestyle and convinces Prakash to not only move out, but also not have anything to do with his parents and their loans. The onus is once again on Kishorilal and Geeta to repay the loan, but Kishorilal becomes ill and is unable to work. Geeta gets the chance to travel to Paris for three weeks to further her career. When she returns, nothing is the same anymore. Her mother has lost her vision in a fire, her father has died, and a deadbeat Ranjeet considers criminal activity to stay alive.

== Cast ==
- Ashok Kumar as Kishorilal Kapoor
- Shashi Kapoor as Ranjeet
- Hema Malini as Geeta Kapoor
- Nirupa Roy as Laajo Kapoor
- Premnath as Bajrang Bahadur
- Madan Puri as Mayadas
- Sujit Kumar as Prakash Kapoor
- Aruna Irani as Reena Kapoor
- Asrani as Jumani
- Ram Mohan as Mayadas's man
- Helen as Rita(Guest Appearance)

== Soundtrack ==
Song	Singer
"Kismat Ki Baat"	Kishore Kumar, Amit Kumar
"Meri Dilruba Mere Paas"	Kishore Kumar, Lata Mangeshkar, Usha Mangeshkar
"Ban Gaya"	Kishore Kumar, Manna Dey
"Hum To Garib"	Anuradha Paudwal
"Zara Jaldi Jaldi"	Lata Mangeshkar
"Neela Peela Hara Gulabi"	Mahendra Kapoor, Manna Dey, Lata Mangeshkar
