= Preet Ki Dori =

- Directed by: Satish Kumar
- Starring: Parikshit Sahni; Tanuja
- Music by: Kalyanji-Anandji
- Release date: 1971
- Country: India
- Language: Hindi

Preet Ki Dori is a 1971 Bollywood drama film directed by Satish Kumar. It stars Parikshit Sahni and Tanuja in lead roles. The music was composed by Kalyanji-Anandji.

== Cast ==
- Parikshit Sahni as Govind
- Tanuja as Radha
- Bindu as Rita
- Jeevan as Banke Bihari
- Nazir Hussain as Madhav
- Lalita Pawar as Govind's Mother

== Music ==
All songs were written by Indeevar.

Song	Singer
"Mila Jo Pyar To Hum"	Kishore Kumar
"Preet Ki Dori Saiyan"	Lata Mangeshkar
"Mila Jo Hamen Tera Pyar"	Lata Mangeshkar
"Jane Na Jane Dil Ki Baat"	Asha Bhosle
"Roop Hai, Rang Hai"	Asha Bhosle
