= Dev Kanya =

- Music by: S. N. Tripathi
- Release date: 1963
- Country: India
- Language: Hindi

Dev Kanya is a Bollywood film. It was released in 1963.

== Music ==
1. "Mata O Mata Jeevan Ki Data" – Asha Bhosle
2. "Pag Ghungharoo Bole Chhananan Chhum" – Asha Bhosle, Mahendra Kapoor
3. "Saiyan Chhod De Mera Haath, Haye Dhadke Jiya, Kaise Chhod Du" – Asha Bhosle, Mohammed Rafi
4. "Zara Pehchano Toh Main Kaun, Kaha Se Aaye" – Asha Bhosle, Mukesh
5. "Bole Jhan Jhan Jhan Payal Bole" – Asha Bhosle
6. "O Sansar Banane Wale" – Asha Bhosle
7. "Piyaa-Milan Ko Jaane Waali Sambhal-Sambhal Kar Chal" – Amirbai Karnataki

The song "Pag Ghungharoo Bole Chhananan Chhum" is set in the Hindustani raga Malkauns.
