= Gehra Daag =

- Directed by: O. P. Ralhan
- Written by: Dhruva Chatterjee; Ehsan Rizvi
- Produced by: O. P. Ralhan
- Starring: Rajendra Kumar; Mala Sinha
- Music by: Ravi
- Release date: 1963
- Country: India
- Language: Hindi

Gehra Daag (transl. Deep stain) is a 1963 Indian Hindi-language romantic crime drama film directed by O. P. Ralhan. A moderate box-office success, the film became the ninth-highest-grossing film of 1963, earning an approximate gross of Rs.1,40,00,000 and a net of Rs.70,00,000. The film stars Rajendra Kumar, Mala Sinha, Lalita Pawar, Usha Kiron, Madan Puri and Manmohan Krishna.

== Plot ==
Shanker, kills a fellow mate to protect his sister's honour. He spends his next ten years in prison for that which his family hides and tells everyone that he is in Africa. After his sentence he meets Shobha due to exchange of parcels in a shop, Later he meets Shobha and her mother whom he saves from drowning due an accidental fall from the ship, she now treats Shankar as a son. He returns and meets Usha and grown up sister Asha. Usha is married to Ramesh and has two children, Asha's marriage is broken when Shankar's imprisonment is revealed. He is saved from committing suicide by Shobha, who loves him and takes him along, Shobha's mother approves of their marriage. When the truth is revealed that the fellow mate he killed accidentally was actually Shobha's brother, Shankar confesses the truth to Shobha's mother, who rebukes him for killing her son. But the jailer convinces her to forgive Shankar as he has repented for all the years spent in jail. Again Shankar goes to commit suicide, but in turn saves Shobha from drowning, finally the mother forgives him for not losing another son. The jailer assures Shankar that he will make Asha his daughter-in-law.

== Cast ==
- Rajendra Kumar as Shankar
- Mala Sinha as Shobha
- Mumtaz as Asha
- Madan Puri as Ramesh
- Usha Kiran as Usha
- Manmohan Krishna as Jailor
- Lalita Pawar as Shobha's Mother
- Ram Mohan as Shobha's Brother
- Ragini as Dancer / Singer

== Music ==
The film's music was composed by Ravi and the lyrics were penned by Shakeel Badayuni.

Song	Singer
"Aaj Udta Hua Ek Panchhi Zindagi Ki Bahaar Mein"	Mohammed Rafi
"Bhagwan, Ek Kasoor Ki Itni Badi Sazaa"	Mohammed Rafi
"Tumhe Pake Humne Jahan Pa Liya Hai"	Mohammed Rafi, Asha Bhosle
"Kaise Kahoon Main Baat Jiya Ki Sanwariya"	Asha Bhosle
"Subah Ka Bhoola Jab Sham Ko Ghar Aa Jaye"	Asha Bhosle
"Main Teri Huyi Re Balma, Kaisa Jaadu Kar Gaye"	Asha Bhosle
