= Shikari (1963 film) =

1963 film by Mohammed Hussain

- Poster
- Directed by: Mohammed Hussain
- Screenplay by: Surinder Mehra; Vrajendra Gaur
- Produced by: F. C. Mehra
- Starring: Ajit; Ragini; Helen
- Music by: G. S. Kohli
- Production company: Eagle Films
- Release date: 1963
- Country: India
- Language: Hindi

Shikari (transl. Hunter) is a 1963 Indian Hindi-language film directed by Mohammed Hussain. It stars Ajit, Ragini, Helen, Madan Puri, K. N. Singh and others. The music of the film was the biggest asset of this film, and the songs "O, Tumko Piya, Dil Diya", "Mangi Hain Duaayen", "Ye Rangeen Mehfil" and "Agar Main Poochhoon", were catchy tunes that became popular on the music chart of the year. The film was loosely based on Hollywood films Dr. Cyclops and King Kong.

== Plot ==
Kapoor (Bir Sakhuja) and Jagdish (Madan Puri) are partners in a Circus. The circus is running in loss so they go on an expedition to jungles of Malay to capture a giant ape known as Otango. Their friend, a scientist Professor Sharma, daughter of Kapoor Rita (Ragini) and Chandu the circus clown (Randhir) accompany them. They take a letter of recommendation for Ajit (Ajit) owner of timber estate from their friend Naib living in Malay. In jungle Rita falls in river from ropeway trolley and gets lost in forest. Ajit saves her and takes her to his estates. Later other members of the expedition also come there. A romance starts to bloom between Ajit and Rita. They request Ajit to accompany them to find Otango. He takes his men and they set out on their quest. They find a village destroyed by Otango. They meet a mad scientist Dr. Cyclops (K. N. Singh) who has set up a laboratory in jungle. He is experimenting to turn humans into gorilla.

Dr. Cyclops is living with his daughter Shobha (Helen) and his henchmen. Shobha wants to save them from his father's nefarious and savage experiments and takes them to a secret passage to run away. But Jagdish tells on them and they are captured. Dr. Cyclops promises Jagdish to help him take away Otango if he helps him marry Rita.

Dr. Cyclops takes Rita to native village to solemnize marriage by Chieftain (Shyam Kumar) making Jagdish incharge of the lab in his absence. Trying to escape Ajit and others fight with Jagdish and henchman. Jagdish falls on lab equipment full of chemicals and dies. Shobha takes them to village where marriage is about to be solemnized. Again fight ensues and Shobha is killed. Otango attacks the village and rampages it. They run and coming to another village sets it on fire in hope that Otango dies. But Otango chases them and they come to a trestle bridge over burning lava. They all cross the bridge and then cut the ropes when Otango is trying to cross. Otango falls in gorge with lava and dies. They reach back timber estate and plan to return to Bombay, accompanied by Ajit, the future son-in-law.

== Cast ==
- Ajit as Ajit
- Ragini as Rita
- Helen as Shobha
- Madan Puri as Jagdish
- K. N. Singh as Dr. Cyclops
- Randhir as Chandu
- Shyam Kumar as Chieftain
- Bir Sakhuja as Kapoor

== Soundtrack ==
Shikari

Soundtrack album by G S Kohli
- Released: 1963
- Recorded: 1963
- Studio: Gramophone Co of India Ltd
- Genre: Feature Film Soundtrack
- Length: 26:39
- Language: Hindi
- Label: EMI

Music for the film is composed by G. S. Kohli, with lyrics by Farooq Qaisar and Qamar Jalalabadi.

Song	Singer
"Baaje Ghunghroo"	Lata Mangeshkar
"Chaman Ke Phool Bhi Tujhko Gulab Kehte Hai"	Lata Mangeshkar, Mohammed Rafi
"Agar Main Poochhun Jawab Doge"	Lata Mangeshkar, Mohammed Rafi
"Tumko Piya Dil Diya Kitne Naaz Se"	Lata Mangeshkar, Usha Mangeshkar
"Maangi Hain Duaen Humne Sanam"	Usha Mangeshkar, Asha Bhosle
"Yeh Rangeen Mehfil"	Asha Bhosle
