= O. P. Ralhan =

British Indian filmmaker (1928–1999)

- Born: 21 August 1928; Sialkot, Punjab, British India
- Died: 20 April 1999 (aged 70)
- Occupations: Writer, producer, director and actor
- Known for: Film: Phool Aur Patthar
- Relatives: Rajendra Kumar (brother-in-law)

O. P. Ralhan (21 August 1928 – 20 April 1999) was a Bollywood producer, director, writer, actor who made several hit movies in 1960s, 1970s and 1980s.

== Biography ==
Om Prakash (O. P.) Ralhan was born on 21 August 1928 in Sialkot, British India, current Pakistan, into a prosperous Hindu Arora family. He was 19 years old when the partition of India happened. He and his family were compelled to leave home and wealth and move as refugees to the territory which remained with India. Here, having lost all their capital and business, they were compelled to work at small jobs to earn a living. O.P. happened to find work with film-makers. Around this time, something else happened which drew him closer to the film world.

Ralhan played small roles in films from early 1950s to the early 1960s. By this time, his brother-in-law had become a very big film star, and he told Ralhan to produce a film starring him. Ralhan managed to get distributors to finance his first film: Gehra Daag (1963), with Rajendra Kumar and Mala Sinha in lead roles. The film was moderately successful, but Ralhan now had a foothold in the industry. Phool aur Patthar, directed by Ralhan himself, with a cast including Meena Kumari, Shashikala and Dharmendra, which went on to make him into a super star. The film was quite successful in Hindi & was also made in Tamil, "Oli Vilakku" starring M.G. Ramachandran, Jaya Lalithaa & Sowkar Janaki. However, he is best remembered as the Director (and also its producer) for film: Talash (1969) with Rajendra Kumar and Sharmila Tagore). The film had excellent music by composer Sachin Dev Burman. It was the most expensive movie made of its time. Hulchul, a comedy suspense thriller without songs. Bandhe Haath a Doppelgänger story starring Mumtaz and Amitabh Bachchan. "Mari Bena" was his venture into regional films starring Reeta Bhaduri, Arvind Kirad, Dina Pathak and himself. His another suspense hit Paapi (1977) a multi starrer with an ensemble cast of Sunil Dutt, Sanjeev Kumar, Zeenat Aman, Reena Roy, Prem Chopra, Danny Denzongpa. His last film Pyaas was made on social subejct starring Tanuja, Zeenat Aman, Kawaljeet Singh and himself.

Among Ralhan's notable achievements are giving breaks to struggling actors and also introducing new actors in his films. He directed film Mujrim (1958) starring Shammi Kapoor and Ragini. He made Phool Aur Patthar (1966) which became Dharmendra's first golden jubilee hit. Zeenat Aman was first introduced into Bollywood by O. P. Ralhan in his 1971 film Hulchul, although the misconception is that Dev Anand brought her with Hare Rama Hare Krishna. Ralhan also introduced Kabir Bedi in Hulchul. He cast Amitabh Bachchan in Bandhe Haath (1973) at a time when he was new to the industry.

O.P Ralhan's wife, Manorama, was the sister of actor Rajendra Kumar. Ralhan had one son "Ricky" Munesh Ralhan. His grandson Armaan (son of his daughter Rupalli) has taken his grandfathers last name 'Ralhan' to continue the legacy of his grandfather in Bollywood.

== Filmography ==
- Mujrim (1958)
- Pyaar Ka Saagar (1961)
- Mughal-E-Azam (1962) movie about Production, Premiere; Documentary
- Gehra Daag (1963)
- Phool Aur Patthar (1966)
- Talash (1969)
- Hulchul (1971)
- Bandhe Hath (1973)
- Paapi (1977)
- Pyaas (1982)
