= Madan Puri =

Indian character actor (1915–1985)

- Born: Madan Lal Puri; 30 September 1915; Rahon, Punjab, British India (present-day Punjab, India)
- Died: 13 January 1985 (aged 69); Bombay, Maharashtra, India
- Occupation: Actor
- Years active: 1940–1985
- Spouse: Sheela Devi Wadhera
- Children: Pravesh Puri; Lt. Col. (Dr.) Kamlesh Kumar Puri; Ramnesh Puri
- Parents: Nihal Chand Puri (father); Ved Kaur (mother)
- Relatives: Chaman Puri (elder brother); Amrish Puri (younger brother); Harish Lal Puri (younger brother); Chandrakanta Mehra (younger sister); K. L. Saigal (first cousin); Kanchan Puri (granddaughter); Sonal Puri (granddaughter); Vikram Puri (grandson); Amrit Puri (grandson); Ishita Puri (granddaughter)

Madan Puri (30 September 1915 – 13 January 1985) was an Indian actor of Hindi and Punjabi films. His brothers were actors Chaman Puri and Amrish Puri. As a character actor mainly in negative roles (villain), he acted in about 430 films in a career spanning above fifty years.

== Early life ==
Madan Lal Puri was born in Nawanshahr, Punjab, in a Punjabi Hindu family, to Nihal Chand Puri and Ved Kaur. He studied in Rahon. He was the second of five children, with elder brother Chaman Puri, younger brothers Amrish Puri and Harish Lal Puri and younger sister Chandrakanta Mehra. He was a cousin of singing sensation Kundan Lal Sehgal.

== Career ==
Puri was one of the doyens of the Indian film industry in the late 1960s and early 1970s. He was the first cousin of the singer K. L. Saigal, with whose help he started to make a mark in Bollywood. Once Puri was an established star he did the same for his brother, Amrish Puri, by helping him in establishing himself in the movie world.

Puri had an acting career which spanned over 40 years from the 1940s through to the mid-1980s. He appeared in more than 430 films. His film debut was titled Ahinsa in 1946. Madan made an average of eight films per year, playing villains and negative characters and the hero's or heroine's uncle, father or elder brother, grandfather, police officer and politician. He starred in a number of Punjabi films throughout his career such as Jatti, Jatt Punjabi and so on.

He died in 1985 of a heart attack at the age of 69. He was a resident of R P Masani Road in Matunga, Mumbai, also known as Punjabi Galli, with other actors of that era including the Kapoors. Several films were released after his death until 1989 with his final being Santosh.

== Personal life ==
Puri's wife, Sheela Devi Puri (Wadhera), died a few years after him. Their son, Lt. Col. (Dr.) Kamlesh K. Puri, published a book about the life and times of Madan Puri titled "My Father, the Villain" in 2015 (the 100th anniversary of his birth).

He is survived by his sons Pravesh Puri, Lt. Col. (Dr.) Kamlesh Kumar Puri and Ramnesh Puri, and his grandchildren Kanchan Puri, Sonal Puri, Vikram Puri, Amrit Puri and Ishita Puri.

== Selected filmography ==
1. Khazanchi (1941) as Kamal's friend (uncredited)
2. Meri Bahen (1944)
3. Kuldeep (1946)
4. 1857 (1946)
5. Ahinsa (1946)
6. Omar Khaiyyam (1946)
7. Chittor Vijay (1947)
8. Vidya (1948) as Harish
9. Sona (1948, Short)
10. Kamal (1949)
11. Jeet (1949) as Ratan
12. Singaar (1949) as Dr. Niranjan
13. Imtihaan (1949)
14. Namoona (1949) as Lachchhu
15. Dil Ki Duniya (1949)
16. Raat Ki Rani (1949)
17. Madari (1950, Punjabi Movie)
18. Anmol Ratan (1950)
19. Nadaan (1951)
20. Adaa (1951)
21. Nazaria (1952)
22. Deewana (1952) as Phulwa
23. Goonj (1952)
24. Raag Rang (1952)
25. Jaggu (1952)
26. Mahatma (1953)
27. Shri Chaitanya Mahaprabhu (1953)
28. Munna (1954)
29. Watan (1954)
30. Mahatma Kabir (1954)
31. Haar Jeet (1954)
32. Amar Kirtan (1954)
33. Rukhsana (1955)
34. Tees Maar Khan (1955)
35. Madhur Milan (1955)
36. Lakhon Mein Ek (1955)
37. Jhanak Jhanak Payal Baaje (1955) as Manilal
38. Teen Bhai (1955)
39. Bhagwat Mahima (1955)
40. Vachan (1955) as Laxmidas
41. Kala Chor (1956)
42. Qeemat (1956)
43. Aabroo (1956)
44. Heer (1956)
45. Nau Do Gyarah (1957) as Radhe Shyam
46. Ek Saal (1957) as Dr. M.M. Puri
47. Narsi Bhagat (1957) (uncredited)
48. Sheroo (1957) as Villain (uncredited)
49. Baarish (1957)
50. Mirza Sahiba (1957) as Shamir
51. Mohini (1957) as Pratap Singh
52. Miss 58 (1958)
53. Howrah Bridge (1958) as John Chang
54. Balyogi Upmanyu (1958)
55. Dilli Ka Thug (1958) as Bihari
56. Kabhi Andhera Kabhi Ujala (1958)
57. Taqdeer (1958)
58. Trolley Driver (1958)
59. Insan Jaag Utha (1959) as Mohan Singh
60. Kanhaiya (1959) as Mano
61. Chirag Kahan Roshni Kahan (1959) as Dr. Mehta
62. Nai Raahen (1959)
63. Charnon Ki Dasi (1959)
64. Kala Bazar (1960) as Ganesh
65. Jaali Note (1960) as Manohar (uncredited)
66. Gambler (1960)
67. Singapore (1960) as Chang
68. Chaudhary Karnail Singh (1960, Punjabi Movie) as Buta K. Singh
69. Kiklee (1960)
70. Ghar Ki Laj (1960) as Gulab's Husband
71. Modern Girl (1961) as Kamal Nath
72. Flight to Assam (1961)
73. Guddi (1961, Punjabi Movie) as Namberdaar
74. Saaya (1961)
75. Pyaar Ka Saagar (1961) as Bishen Chand Gupta
76. Tel Malish Boot Polish (1961) as Girdhari
77. Kala Chashma (1962)
78. Gangu (1962) as Madan
79. China Town (1962) as Joseph Wong
80. Bees Saal Baad (1962) as Dr. Pandey
81. Rakhi (1962) as Choudhary Bhagwandas
82. Naughty Boy (1962) as R.L. Mathur 'Matur'
83. Aeh Dharti Punjab Di (1963)
84. Gehra Daag (1963) as Ramesh
85. Ek Raaz (1963) as Chunilal
86. Shikari (1963) as Jagdish
87. Dekha Pyaar Tumhara (1963) as Madan
88. Sunheri Nagin (1963)
89. Godaan (1963)
90. Khooni Khazana (1964)
91. Main Jatti Punjab Di Punjabi Movie (1964, Punjabi Movie) as Para Lel
92. Cha Cha Cha (1964) as Dance emcee
93. Kashmir Ki Kali (1964) as Shyamlal
94. Kohraa (1964) as Kamal Rai
95. Ziddi (1964) as Moti
96. Ayee Milan Ki Bela (1964) as Ratanlal
97. Mr. X in Bombay (1964) as Rajan
98. Shaheed (1965) as Jailor
99. Gumnaam (1965) as Dr. Acharya
100. Waqt (1965) as Balvir
101. Main Wohi Hoon (1965) as Jagdish
102. Neela Akash (1965) as Abdul
103. Mohabbat Isko Kahete Hain (1965) as Kundan
104. Do Matwale (1966)
105. Street Singer (1966)
106. Phool Aur Patthar (1966) as Boss
107. Love in Tokyo (1966) as Asha's Uncle
108. Sawan Ki Ghata (1966) as Limo
109. Thakur Jarnail Singh (1966)
110. Main Wohi Hoon (1966) as Jagdish
111. Nasihat (1967) as Mr. Singh
112. Naujavan (1967)
113. Hamraaz (1967) as Captain (Rajesh's friend)
114. Shagird (1967) as Madan Chicagowala
115. Baharon Ke Sapne (1967) as Ranjeet
116. Upkar (1967) as Charandas
117. Aag (1967) as Kallu Singh
118. Aamne Samne (1967) as Pran Mathur
119. Dilruba (1967)
120. Gunehgar (1967) as Murli
121. Johar in Bombay (1967) as Gopal
122. Hamare Gam Se Mat Khelo (1967)
123. Ek Raat (1968) as Madan
124. Duniya (1968) as Madan
125. Humsaya (1968) as Prof. Tao Kai Chen
126. Juaari (1968) as Bankelal
127. Aankhen (1968) as Captain
128. Kahin Aur Chal (1968)
129. Ek Phool Ek Bhool (1968) as Boss
130. Hai Mera Dil (1968) as Pyarelal
131. Teri Talash Mein (1968) (uncredited)
132. Aanchal Ke Phool (1968)
133. Oos Raat Ke Baad (1969) as Thakur Madan Singh
134. Sajan (1969) as Seth Dharamdas
135. Aadmi Aur Insaan (1969) as Sabharwal
136. Aradhana (1969) as Prison Warden
137. Ittefaq (1969) as Public Prosecutor Khanna
138. Pyar Hi Pyar (1969) as Dindayal
139. Talash (1969) as Peter
140. Tumse Achha Kaun Hai (1969) as Brothel Patron
141. Pyar Ka Mausam (1969) as Shankar
142. Shatranj (1969) as Comrade Chang
143. Prem Pujari (1970) as Chang
144. The Train (1970) as Yogi / No. 1
145. Sawan Bhadon (1970) as Robber who robs Vikram
146. My Love (1970) as Pran Mehra
147. Bhai Bhai (1970) as Robbery Gang Leader
148. Kati Patang (1970) as Vishnu Prasad
149. Yaadgaar (1970) as Madan Singh
150. Aag Aur Daag (1970) as Madanlal
151. Choron Ka Chor (1970) as Madanlal
152. Purab Aur Paschim (1970) as Preeti's dad
153. Devi (1970) as Joginder
154. Ehsan (1970) as Pawan Kumar
155. Bahake Kadam (1971)
156. Ek Paheli (1971) as Shankarlal
157. Lakhon Mein Ek (1971) as Jaggu
158. Haathi Mere Saathi (1971) as Ratanlal
159. Purani Pehchan (1971) as Dr. Khoshla
160. Elaan (1971) as Mr. Verma
161. Rakhwala (1971) as Jwalaprasad
162. Nadaan (1971) as Manglu
163. Caravan (1971) as Mithalal Tota
164. Woh Din Yaad Karo (1971) as Madan
165. Hulchul (1971) as Mahesh Jetley
166. Ramu Ustad (1971) as Madan
167. Paras (1971) as Thakur Prithvi Singh
168. Amar Prem (1971) as Nepal Babu
169. Guddi (1971) as Lambhardara
170. Sanjog (1972) as Shiv Dayal
171. Dastaan (1972) as Public Prosecutor - Anil Kumar's case
172. Haar Jeet (1972) as Madhusudan Gupta
173. Apradh (1972) as German Doctor
174. Anuraag (1972) as Amirchand
175. Samadhi (1972) as Jaggu
176. Jai Jwala (1972) as Kundan
177. Janwar Aur Insaan (1972) as Gokulchand
178. Apna Desh (1972) as Satyanarayan
179. Shor (1972) as Factory owner (Guest Appearance)
180. Double Cross (1972) as Maganbhai
181. Rani Mera Naam (1972)
182. Shehzada (1972) as Chanda's maternal uncle
183. Gora Aur Kala (1972) as Raja Zoravar Singh (Anuradha's Father)
184. Wafaa (1972) as Zamindar
185. Sazaa (1972) as Shankar
186. Bandagi (1972)
187. Rut Rangeeli Ayee (1972) as Jaggu
188. Dhund (1973) as Inspector Joshi
189. Bandhe Hath (1973) as Shyamu's Mentor
190. Loafer (1973) as Mr. Puri
191. Daag: A Poem of Love (1973) as K.C. Khanna
192. Bada Kabutar (1973) as Ghaffoor (uncredited)
193. Joshila (1973) as Madanlal Dogra
194. Dharma (1973) as Mangal Singh
195. Black Mail (1973) as Dr. Khurana
196. Khoon Khoon (1973)
197. Kahani Hum Subb Ki (1973) as College Principle
198. Gaddaar (1973) as Kanhaiya
199. Naya Nasha (1973) as Protesting student's dad - Politician
200. Hifazat (1973) as Saw Mill Owner
201. Nafrat (1973)
202. Wohi Raat Wohi Awaaz (1973)
203. Daaman Aur Aag (1973) as Surajmal
204. Ek Nari Do Roop (1973) as Belani
205. Anuraag (1973) as Amirchand
206. Manoranjan (1974) as Police Inspector
207. Chor Machaye Shor (1974) as Seth Jamunadas
208. Jab Andhera Hota Hai (1974) as Sohanlal Bhardwaj
209. Ajanabee (1974) as Mr. M.M. Puri
210. Bidaai (1974) as Dharam Das
211. Benaam (1974) as Gopal
212. Roti Kapda Aur Makaan (1974) as Nekiram
213. Majboor (1974) as Mahipat Rai
214. Pran Jaye Par Vachan Na Jaye (1974) as Jagmohan
215. 36 Ghante (1974)
216. Zehreela Insaan (1974) as John
217. Charitraheen (1974) as Avinash
218. Sauda (1974) as Dharamdas
219. Satgur Nanak Bakshanhar (1974) as Malak Bhaago
220. Rafoo Chakkar (1975) as Prakash
221. Warrant (1975) as Professor Ashok Verma
222. Deewaar (1975) as Samant
223. Zameer (1975) as Daku Maan Singh
224. Dharmatma (1975) as Ranbir's Uncle
225. Geet Gaata Chal (1975) as Sohan Singh
226. Ponga Pandit (1975) as Shambhunath
227. Dafaa 302: Indian Penal Code Section 302 (Section of Murder) (1975) as Inspector General of Police
228. Angaarey (1975)
229. Saazish (1975) as Wong
230. Raftaar (1975) as Jackson
231. Khalifa (1976) as Dharamdas Sharma
232. Kalicharan (1976) as Jaagir Singh
233. Bhanwar (1976) as John D'Souza / Johny
234. Mehbooba (1976) as Sardar
235. Fakira (1976) as Chiman Lal
236. Bairaag (1976) as Glasco
237. Barood (1976) as B. Puri - Bakshi's New York Associate
238. Aaj Ka Ye Ghar (1976) as Sajjan's Father-in-law
239. Aap Beati (1976) as Mayadas
240. Daaj (1976) as Deen Dyaal
241. Deewaangee (1976) as George
242. Sher Puttar (1977) as Seth Madan Lal
243. Paapi (1977) as Harnamdas
244. Aaina (1977) as M.B. Patil
245. Lachhi (1977) as Thanedaar Dharam Chand
246. Dulhan Wahi Jo Piya Man Bhaye (1977) as Harkishan
247. Wangar (1977) as Chet Ram
248. Darinda (1977) as Thakur Saab
249. Vishwasghaat (1977) as Uday's dad
250. Mandir Masjid (1977)
251. Kasum Khoon Ki (1977) as Shooter from Dubai
252. Shirdi Ke Sai Baba (1977) as Ranvir Singh
253. Chakkar Pe Chakkar (1977) as Swami Hari Om
254. Ram Bharose (1977) as Boss
255. Mera Vachan Geeta Ki Qasam (1977) as Priest
256. Chaalu Mera Naam (1977) as Shyamlal
257. Jai Ambe Maa (1977)
258. Atyachaar (1978)
259. Vishwanath (1978) as Pukhraj
260. Ghar (1978) as Vikas' Father
261. Naya Daur (1978) as Mehta
262. Bandie (1978) as Bharatpur's Diwanji
263. Ankhiyon Ke Jharokhon Se (1978) as Mr. Mathur (Arun's dad)
264. Swarg Narak (1978) as Lala Lalchand
265. Aahuti (1978) as Heeralal
266. Heeralaal Pannalaal (1978)
267. Tere Pyaar Mein (1978)
268. Chor Ho To Aisa (1978) as Chinaramu "Ramu"
269. Aakhri Kasam (1979) as Malang Baba
270. Badmashon Ka Badmaash (1979)
271. Gawaah (1979)
272. Aatish (1979) as Girdhari
273. Gautam Govinda (1979) as Bagha
274. Muqabla (1979)
275. The Great Gambler (1979) as Ratan Das
276. Noorie (1979) as Lala Karamchand
277. Jaani Dushman (1979) as Blind Vaidji (Reshma's dad)
278. Shaitan Mujrim (1979) as Dr. Kailash Naath
279. Raadha Aur Seeta (1979) as Shankar Saxena
280. Kaala Patthar (1979) as Vikram's father
281. Lok Parlok (1979) as Kalicharan
282. Shabhash Daddy (1979)
283. Raakhi Ki Saugandh (1979) as Bachchan Singh
284. Aur Kaun? (1979) as Kailash Nath
285. Jaan-e-Bahaar (1979) as Ajit's maternal uncle
286. Jatt Punjabi (1979) as Shah
287. Zulm Ki Pukar (1979)
288. Desh Drohee (1980) as Madan Lal
289. Dam Maro Dam (1980)
290. Dhan Daulat (1980) as Shanti's dad
291. Zalim (1980) as Mr. Marshell
292. Khwab (1980) as Ram Prasad
293. The Burning Train (1980) as Ashok's dad
294. Swayamvara (1980) as Makhanlal
295. Hum Nahin Sudhrenge (1980) as Mr. Lakhanpal
296. Alibaba Aur 40 Chor (1980) as Fatima's dad
297. Jatti (1980) as Krishan Lal Kapoor
298. Lahu Pukarega (1980)
299. Ek Baar Kaho (1980) as Dr. Puri (Rajni's father)
300. Abdullah (1980) as Military Commander
301. Humkadam (1980) as Hari Harprasad
302. Aap To Aise Na The (1980) as Khanna / Jagjit 'Jaggi' Singh
303. Ek Gunah Aur Sahi (1980) as Mr. Verma
304. Taxi Chor (1980) as Shamsher Singh / Anthony
305. Bandish (1980)
306. Fauji Chacha (1980)
307. Judaai (1980) as Mr. Dube
308. Yeh Kaisa Insaaf (1980) as Mr. Nath
309. Patita (1980) as Jain's Father
310. Saajan Mere Main Saajan Ki (1980)
311. Dahej (1981)
312. Parakh (1981)
313. Naari (1981) as Shivdayal Verma
314. Kranti (1981) as Sher Singh
315. Nakhuda (1981) as Jagannath Gupta
316. Mangalsutra (1981) as Badri Prasad
317. Itni Si Baat (1981) as Darbarilal (as Madanpuri)
318. Dahshat (1981) as Sameer's Father
319. Pyaasa Sawan (1981) as Prabhudas
320. Sahhas (1981) as Jaggan
321. Prem Geet (1981) as Mr. Bhardwaj
322. Khuda Kasam (1981) as Kishanlal (Guest Appearance)
323. Chhupa Chhuppi (1981)
324. Kahani Ek Chor Ki (1981)
325. Sharada (1981) as Mr. Kohli (Anita's dad & Inder's boss)
326. Poonam (1981) as Thakur Kishan Singh
327. Josh (1981)
328. Nai Imarat (1981) as Thakur Mahendra Pratap Singh
329. Bharosa (1981)
330. Beta (1982)
331. Honey (1982)
332. Haathkadi (1982) as Harimohan's Boss
333. Patthar Ki Lakeer (1982)
334. Sawaal (1982) as Govindram
335. Badle Ki Aag (1982) as Mohanlal Verma
336. Ghazab (1982) as Jatha Shankar
337. Heeron Ka Chor (1982)
338. Aadat Se Majboor (1982) as Dinanath Shastri
339. Ayaash (1982) as Sansar
340. Vidhaata (1982) as Khushiram Khusal Singh (K.K.)
341. Apradhi Kaun? (1982) as Rai Bahadur Dindayal
342. Dard Ka Rishta (1982) as Dr.Anuradha's Father
343. Pyaas (1982)
344. Dulha Bikta Hai (1982) as Seema's dad
345. Khush Naseeb (1982) as Ghanshyam
346. Sant Gyaneshwar (1982) as Mahapandit Vishoba
347. Anmol Sitaare (1982)
348. Humse Na Jeeta Koi (1983) as Girdhari
349. Nastik (1983) as Police Inspector Gangaram
350. Avtaar (1983) as Seth Jugal Kishore (Guest Appearance)
351. Ganga Meri Maa (1983) as Roopa Daku aka Roopchand
352. Andhaa Kaanoon (1983) as Jailor Gupta
353. Painter Babu (1983) as Mali Kaka
354. Jeet Hamaari (1983) as Avtar Singh
355. Woh Jo Hasina (1983) as Damodar Das
356. Naukar Biwi Ka (1983) as Movie Director
357. Bade Dil Wala (1983) as Makhanlal
358. Sweekar Kiya Maine (1983) as Lala Dhaniram
359. Mazdoor (1983) as Daulatram
360. Doosri Dulhan (1983)
361. Paanchwin Manzil (1983) as Dr Radhamohan
362. Agar Tum Na Hote (1983) as Shakur Ahmed
363. Hero (1983) as Bharat
364. Main Awara Hoon (1983) as Chandulal 'Paowala'
365. Gulami Ki Zaanjeerein (1983)
366. Mehndi (1983) as Madhuri's dad
367. Dharti Aakash (1983, TV Movie) as Jagdish
368. Hum Se Mile Tum (1984)
369. Prerana (1984) as Jhumman Miya
370. Sardaar (1984) as DharamDas
371. Mashaal (1984) as Tolaram
372. Aaj Ka M.L.A. Ram Avtar (1984) as Makhanlal Kesri
373. Baazi (1984) as Durgaprasad Sharma
374. Asha Jyoti (1984) as Badri Prasad
375. Lorie (1984) as Mr. Kapoor (Father of 12 kids)
376. Kunwari Bahu (1984)
377. Raaj Tilak (1984) as Ranjeet
378. Awaaz (1984) as Mirchandani
379. Yaadon Ki Zanjeer (1984) as Mathur / Seth Mohandas
380. Tere Mere Beech Mein (1984) as Mahajan
381. Raja Aur Rana (1984) as Pinto
382. Tarkeeb (1984)
383. Waqt Ki Pukar (1984) as Subedhar
384. Pyaar Bina Jag Soona (1985)
385. Damad Chahiye (1985) as Shiv Prasad Gupta
386. Pyaase Honth (1985) as Anand's Father in law
387. Lava (1985) as Dayal
388. Ram Tere Kitne Nam (1985) as Guru (uncredited)
389. Jawaab (1985) as Lakhani
390. Ulta Seedha (1985) as Colonel Khurana
391. Yudh (1985) as Dayal
392. Yaadon Ki Kasam (1985) as Bishambharnath Kapoor
393. Baadal (1985) as Thakur Raghuvir Singh
394. Bepanaah (1985) as Devilal
395. Jhoothi (1985) as Professor Puri
396. Babu (1985) as Shambhu Nath
397. Cheekh (1985) as Thakur
398. Sautela Pati (1985) as Madan Puri
399. Pyaari Bhabhi (1985)
400. Maujaan Dubai Diyaan (1985) as Jaganathan
401. Teri Aarzoo (1985)
402. Khel Mohabbat Ka (1986) as Rehman Khan
403. Jaan Hatheli Pe (1986)
404. Madadgaar (1987) as Advocate Gupta
405. Khazana (1987) as Jai Singh
406. Vishaal (1987) as Laawaris
407. Saazish (1988) as Banerjee
408. Santosh (1989) as Kaka
409. Lakhpati (1991) as Manshukhbhai (final film role)
