= Mala Sinha filmography =

- Film: 123

Mala Sinha (born Alda Sinha; 11 November 1936) is a former Indian actress who has worked in Hindi, Bengali and Nepali films. Initially starting her career with regional cinema, she went on to become an actress in Hindi Cinema in the late 1950s, 1960s and early 1970s. In a career spanning four decades, Mala Sinha rose to prominence with films like Guru Dutt's Pyaasa (1957) and Yash Chopra's Dhool Ka Phool (1959). Later, she starred in over hundred film productions including Phir Subah Hogi (1958), Hariyali Aur Rasta, Anpadh (both 1962), Dil Tera Deewana (1962), Gumrah, Bahurani (both 1963), Jahan Ara (1964), Himalay Ki God Mein (1965), Ankhen, Do Kaliyan (both 1968), Maryada (1971) . She was known as the "daring diva" and "torch bearer of women's cinema" for essaying strong female centric and unconventional roles in a range of movies considered ahead of her times. Having received multiple awards and nominations, she was given the Filmfare Lifetime Achievement Award in 2018.

Mala Sinha was paired in roles opposite leading male stars which includes her seniors Ashok Kumar, Bharat Bhushan, Rehman Khan, Ajit Khan, Dev Anand, Shekhar, Raj Kapoor, Pradeep Kumar, Guru Dutt, Uttam Kumar, Raaj Kumar, Rajendra Kumar, Kishore Kumar, Shammi Kapoor to later debuting stars Sunil Dutt, Dharmendra Deol, Biswajit Chatterjee, Manoj Kumar, Sanjeev Kumar, Joy Mukherjee, Sanjay Khan, Jeetendra Kapoor, Amitabh Bachchan and Rajesh Khanna. She was the highest-paid actress from 1958 to 1965 with Vyjayanthimala, second with Vyjayanthimala from 1966 to 1967, then shared the second spot with Sharmila Tagore from 1968 to 1971, and third position with Sadhana and Nanda in 1972–73.

== Filmography ==
=== Hindi films ===
Year	Film	Role	Notes
1954	Hamlet	Ophelia	
1954	Badshah	Malti	
1955	Ekadashi	Maharani Sandyavalli	
1955	Riyasat	Amber	
1956	Rangeen Raatein	Mala	
1956	Paisa Hi Paisa	Mala	
1956	Jaldeep		
1957	Nausherwan-E-Adil	Marcia	
1957	Ek Gaon Ki Kahani	Jaya	
1957	Apradhi Kaun?	Shobha	
1957	Laal Batti		
1957	Naya Zamana	Shanta	
1957	Fashion	Shanta	
1957	Pyaasa	Meena	
1958	Devar Bhabhi		
1958	Parvarish	Asha Singh	
1958	Phir Subah Hogi	Sohni	
1958	Chandan		
1958	Detective	Mashin Loonpe	
1958	Ek Shola	Mala	
1959	Dhool Ka Phool	Meena Khosla	Nominated: Filmfare Best Actress Award
1959	Love Marriage	Geeta	
1959	Main Nashe Mein Hoon	Shanta	
1959	Duniya Na Mane	Geeta	
1959	Ujala	Chhabili	
1959	Jaal Saz	Meera	
1960	Patang	Shanti	
1960	Bewaqoof	Mala	
1960	Mitti Mein Sona		
1961	Suhag Sindoor	Ratna alias Chanda	
1961	Maya	Shyama	
1961	Dharmputra	Husn Bano	
1962	Hariyali Aur Rasta	Shobhna alias Kamala	
1962	Anpadh	Lajwanti	
1962	Bombay Ka Chor	Mala	
1962	Ankh Micholi	Mala alias Nayantara	
1962	Gyara Hazar Ladkian	Asha Premchand	
1962	Dil Tera Deewana	Meena	
1963	Phool Bane Angaare	Usha	
1963	Gumrah	Meena	
1963	Bahurani	Padma	Nominated: Filmfare Best Actress Award
1963	Gehra Daag	Shobha	
1964	Main Suhagan Hoon	Shanti	
1964	Jahan Ara	Jahan Ara Begum	Nominated: Filmfare Best Actress Award
1964	Apne Huye Paraye	Rekha	
1964	Suhagan	Sharada Dubey	
1964	Pooja Ke Phool	Shanti Rai	
1965	Himalay Ki God Mein	Phoolwa	Nominated: Filmfare Best Actress Award
1965	Neela Aakash	Neela	
1965	Bahu Beti	Shanta	
1966	Aasra	Shobha	
1966	Dillagi	Seema	
1966	Mere Lal	Madhu	Guest Appearance
1966	Baharen Phir Bhi Aayengi	Ameeta Sinha	
1967	Nai Roshni	Rekha	
1967	Night in London	Renu Sinha alias Princess Vijay Nagar	
1967	Jaal	Sheila	
1967	Jab Yaad Kisi Ki Aati Hai	Roopa	
1968	Mere Huzoor	Sultanat	
1968	Humsaya	Shin Tan	
1968	Do Kaliyan	Kiran	
1968	Ankhen	Meenakshi Mehta	
1969	Do Bhai	Sandhya	
1969	Paisa Ya Pyar	Shanti	
1969	Pyar Ka Sapna	Sudha alias Sushma	
1969	Tamanna	Saroj	
1970	Holi Ayee Re	Suhagini alias Hemlata	
1970	Kangan	Shanta	
1970	Geet	Kamala	
1971	Sanjog	Asha	
1971	Maryada	Lalita and Lakshmi	Double Role
1971	Chaahat	Geeta	
1972	Rivaaj	Lakshmi	
1972	Lalkar	Usha Chaudhary	
1973	Rickshawala	Parvati	
1973	Kahani Hum Sab Ki	Sandhya	
1974	Archana	Archana	
1974	Kora Badan	Unnamed Dancer	Guest Appearance
1974	36 Ghante	Deepa Roy	
1974	Phir Kab Milogi	Sapna alias Paro	
1975	Sunehra Sansar	Lakshmi	
1976	Do Ladkiyan	Geeta and Sujata	Double Role
1976	Zindagi	Sarojini	
1976	Mazdoor Zindabaad	Seeta Singh	
1977	Prayashchit	Rama alias Roshni bai	
1978	Karmayogi	Durga	
1978	Sone Ka Dil Lohe Ke Haath	Maa	
1980	Be-Reham	Maya alias Devki Bai	
1980	Dhan Daulat	Vasudha	
1981	Ye Rishta Na Tootay	Madhu	
1981	Harjaee	Sharda	
1981	Naseeb	Herself	Guest Appearance in the song John Jani Janardhan
1982	Nek Parveen	Parveen Bano	
1983	Film Hi Film		Footage of the shelved film Naya Mandir (1961) starring Manoj Kumar opposite her with direction of Kishore Sahu was used.
1984	Aasmaan	Kumar's Mother	
1985	Babu	Pinky's Mother	
1987	Dil Tujhko Diya	Savitri	
1992	Radha Ka Sangam	Thakurain	
1992	Khel	Sulakshana	
1994	Zid	Daadimaa	

=== Bengali films ===
Year	Film	Role	Notes
1946	Jai Vaishnav Devi		Worked as a child artist
1947	Krishna Leela		Worked as a child artist
1952	Roshan Ara		
1953	Jog Biyog		
1954	Dhooli	Ratri	
1954	Chitrangadha		
1954	Bhakta Bilwamangal		
1956	Putrabadhu	Shukla	
1957	Surer Parashey		
1957	Prithibi Amare Chaay	Meena	
1958	Lukochuri	Reeta	
1958	Louha Kapat	Kanchi	
1958	Bondhu	Sujata	
1959	Khelaghar	Ruchira "Ruchi"	
1959	Chhabi	Mashry	
1960	Shaharer Itikatha	Krishna	
1961	Sathi Hara	Roopa	
1961	Rai Bahadur		
1965	Abhaya O Srikanta	Abhaya	
1976	Dampati	Charu	
1977	Kabita	Kabita	
2000	Kulangaar	Shanti	

=== Nepali film ===
Year	Film	Role	Notes
1966	Maitighar	Maya	Opposite future husband and Nepali film actor Chidambar Prasad Lohani.
