= 11th Filmfare Awards =

1964 awards for Hindi cinema

- Date: June 17, 1964
- Site: Bombay

Highlights
- Best Film: Bandini
- Best Actor: Sunil Dutt for Mujhe Jeene Do
- Best Actress: Nutan for Bandini
- Most awards: Bandini (6)
- Most nominations: Dil Ek Mandir & Gumrah (8)

The 11th Filmfare Awards ceremony was held on 17 June 1964, honoring the best films in Hindi Cinema in 1963.

Dil Ek Mandir and Gumrah led the ceremony with eight nominations each, followed by Mere Mehboob with seven nominations and Bandini with six nominations.

Bandini won six awards, including Best Film, Best Director (for Bimal Roy) and Best Actress (for Nutan), thus becoming the most-awarded film at the ceremony.

== Main awards ==
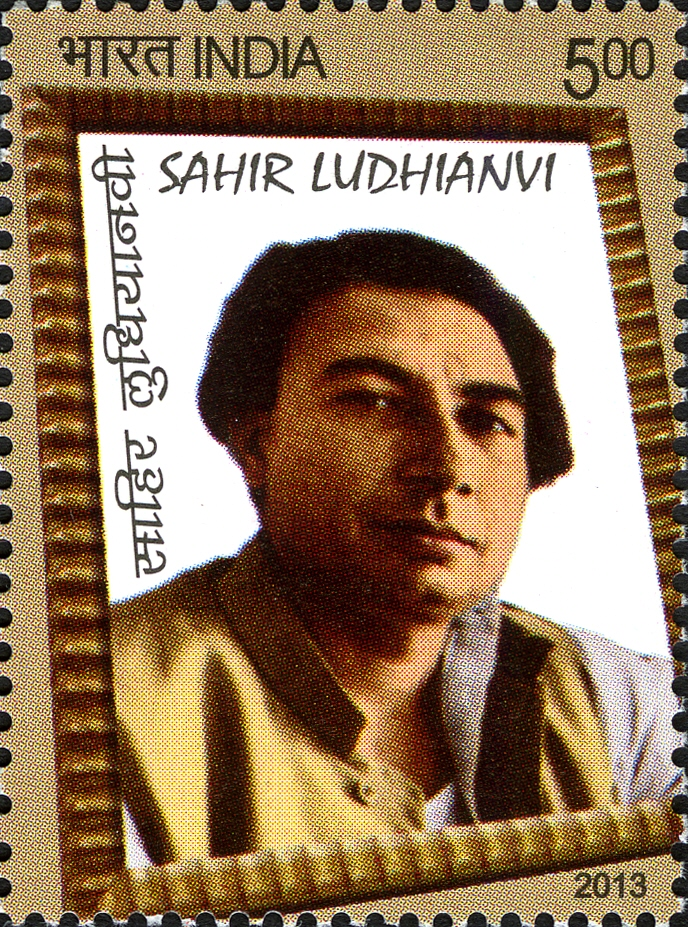
Sahir Ludhianvi, Best Lyricist

Best Film	Best Director
Bandini – Bimal Roy Productions – Bimal Roy; Dil Ek Mandir – S. K. Kapur; Gumrah – Baldev Raj Chopra	Bimal Roy – Bandini; Baldev Raj Chopra – Gumrah; C. V. Sridhar – Dil Ek Mandir
Best Actor	Best Actress
Sunil Dutt – Mujhe Jeene Do as Thakur Jarnail Singh; Ashok Kumar – Gumrah as Ashok; Rajendra Kumar – Dil Ek Mandir as Dr. Dharmesh	Nutan – Bandini as Kalyani; Mala Sinha – Bahurani as Padma; Meena Kumari – Dil Ek Mandir as Sita
Best Supporting Actor	Best Supporting Actress
Raaj Kumar – Dil Ek Mandir as Ram; Mehmood – Ghar Basake Dekho as Sunder; Johnny Walker – Mere Mehboob as Bindadeen Rastogi	Shashikala – Gumrah as Leela; Ameeta – Mere Mehboob as Naseem Ara; Nimmi – Mere Mehboob as Najma
Best Music Director	Best Lyricist
Roshan – Taj Mahal; Naushad – Mere Mehboob; Shankar–Jaikishan – Dil Ek Mandir	Sahir Ludhianvi – "Jo Vaada Kiya" from Taj Mahal; Sahir Ludhianvi – "Chalo Ek Baar" from Gumrah; Shakeel Badayuni – "Mere Mehboob Tujhe" from Mere Mehboob
Best Playback Singer – Male	Best Playback Singer – Female
Mahendra Kapoor – "Chalo Ek Baar" from Gumrah; Mohammed Rafi – "Mere Mehboob" from Mere Mehboob	Award won by a male singer; Lata Mangeshkar – "Jo Vaada Kiya" from Taj Mahal
Best Story	Best Dialogue
Jarasandha – Bandini; C. V. Sridhar – Dil Ek Mandir; Story Department (B. R. Films) – Gumrah	Arjun Dev Rashk – Dil Ek Mandir

== Technical Awards ==
Best Editing	Best Cinematography
Pran Mehra – Gumrah	Kamal Bose – Bandini (for B/W); Krishnarao Vashirde – Sehra (for Color)
Best Art Direction	Best Sound Design
Sudhendu Roy – Mere Mehboob	Dinshaw Billimoria – Bandini

== Superlatives ==
The following films had multiple wins and/or nominations

Movie	Awards	Nominations
Bandini	6	6
Gumrah	3	8
Dil Ek Mandir	2	8
Taj Mahal	2	3
Mere Mehboob	1	7

== See also ==
- 10th Filmfare Awards
- 12th Filmfare Awards
- Filmfare Awards
