= Louhakapat =

1958 Bengali film

Louhakapat (The Iron Gate) is a Bengali thriller drama film directed by Tapan Sinha and Pramod Kumar Lahiri based on the same name novel of Jarasandha (Charu Chandra Chakraborty). It was released on 3 January 1958 under the banner of Janata Pictures & Theatres. This film received National award of Certificate of Merit for Second Best Feature Film.

== Plot ==
The film revolves with the experiences of a prison jailor who closely observes the lives of convicts. The convicts appear merely as criminals but their deep rooted pain, poverty and tragic pasts never considered by traditional justice system while sending to the jail.

== Cast ==
- Bhanu Bannerjee
- Kali Bannerjee
- Mala Sinha
- Chhabi Biswas
- Anil Chatterjee
- Kamal Mitra
- Jahor Roy
- Amar Mullick
- Nirmal Kumar
- Dilip Roy
- Nripati Chatterjee
