= Chaahat =

Chaahat may refer to:

- Chaahat (1996 film), a 1996 Bollywood film by director Mahesh Bhatt
- Chaahat (1971 film), a 1971 Bollywood romance film directed by Homi Bhattacharya
- Chahat Pandey, Indian television actress
- Chahatt Khanna, Indian film actress
