= Chandradhar Sharma Guleri =

Indian writer and scholar (1883–1922)

Chandradhar Sharma Guleri (7 July 1883 – 11 September 1922) was a writer and scholar of Hindi, Sanskrit, Prakrit and Pali from Jaipur, India. He was born in Jaipur and his father belongs to Guler village in Himachal Pradesh hence "Guleri" at the end of the name (as a tribute to his point of origin). Described as a versatile genius, he is known as the author of Usne Kaha Tha (Hindi: उसने कहा था), first published in 1915, which is debated to be the first short story in Hindi. He is also remembered for his efforts to preserve the Jantar Mantar Observatory in Jaipur.

== Career ==
Pandit Guleri graduated from Allahabad University and later headed the Department of Sanskrit at Mayo College, Ajmer. In 1922, he was appointed to the Manindra Chandra Nandi Chair in Ancient History and Religion at Banaras Hindu University.

== Film adaptation of Usne Kaha Tha ==
The story Usne Kaha Tha was brought to the big screen in 1960 with the same name. Produced by Bimal Roy, the film starred Sunil Dutt and Nanda and directed by Moni Bhattacharjee.

== Bibliography ==
- Purani Hindi (Essays on Hindi language and literature; with a sampling of early Hindi literature). Publisher: Nagari Pracharini Sabha, Kashi 1948.
- Guleri Rachnavali ( Selected works). Edited by Dr. Manoharlal. Publisher: Kitab Ghar. New Delhi 1991 ISBN 81-7016-084-7.
- Guleri Katha Kahani Samagra ( Collection of short stories). Edited by Sudhakar Pandey. Publisher: Nagari Pracharini Sabha, Varanasi 1994.
- Pandit Chandradhar Sharma Guleri aur unki kavitayen ( Poems in Hindi and Sanskrit) Edited by Vidyadhar Sharma Guleri. Publisher: Chinmaya Prakashan, Jaipur 1981.
- Guleri patra-sahitya:antahsakshya dvara parichaya ( Insights from the correspondence of Pandit Guleri). Edited by Jhabarmal Sharma. Publisher: Gaurav Gaatha Sangam, Delhi 1988.

=== Commemorative volume ===
- Guleri Sahityalok (Articles on works and sampling of writings; published to mark Pandit Guleri's birth centenary) by Dr. Manoharlal. Publisher: Kitab Ghar, Delhi 1984.

=== Edited work ===
- Prithvirajavijaya (Poem in Sanskrit on Prithviraja III by Jayanaka in 12th century CE and commentary of Jonaraja). Edited by Gaurishankar Hirachand Ojha and Chandradhar Sharma Guleri. First published 1941. Publisher: Rajasthani Granthaghar, Jodhpur 1997.

=== Stage adaptation ===
- Buddhu ka Kanta ( Play based on short story by Pandit Guleri) Adaptation by Ashok Kumar Hans. Publisher: Rishabacharan Jain, New Delhi 1984.

=== Translation ===
- Buddha-charita (Hindi translation of Edwin Arnold's The Light of Asia). Translated by Ram Chandra Shukla and Chandradhar Sharma Guleri. Publisher: Nagaripracharini Sabha, Kashi 1938.

== Notes and references ==
=== Sources ===
- Columbia University Library catalogue
- University of Chicago Library catalogue
