= Nalinikanta Sarkar =

Nalinikanta Sarkar (28 September 1889 – 18 May 1984) was a Bengali literary figure, journalist, poet, singer, literary connoisseur, and prosodist. However, he was best known as a composer and singer of comic songs. He was a lifelong friend of Kazi Nazrul Islam. He composed the musical notations for Nazrul's notation collection Surmukur. Nalinikanta started his journalism career in the Jangipur Sangbad newspaper founded by Sarat Chandra Pandit (popularly known as Dadathakur). While Sarat Chandra Pandit was still alive, Nalinikanta's biographical book Dadathakur was adapted into a film of the same name, where Chhabi Biswas played the title role.

== Brief biography ==
Nalinikanta Sarkar's father was Nikunja Bihari Sarkar of Kaliachak in Malda district. Nalinikanta spent his childhood and youth in Jagatai village in the Nimtita area of Murshidabad district, West Bengal. He was involved with revolutionary groups. For a time, he worked in the library of the Lalgola kings under Baradacharan Majumdar.

He sang several songs written by Kazi Nazrul Islam on the radio and on gramophone records. He created the musical notations for Nazrul's first notation compilation, Surmukur. It contains notations for 27 of Nazrul's songs. The book was published by D.M. Library in 1934. It was largely due to his encouragement that Nazrul became involved with audio recording. Furthermore, Nalinikanta Sarkar wrote the biographical book Dadathakur during the lifetime of the comedian and publisher Sarat Chandra Pandit.

Born into a devout Vaishnava family, he was drawn towards spirituality from an early age. In his later years, he came into close contact with many saints and spiritual figures. He was a favorite disciple of the householder-yogi Baradacharan Majumdar and the yogi Kalipada Guharoy. In 1921, he met Sri Aurobindo in Puducherry for the first time and received the opportunity to practice Yoga sadhana. Later, in 1948, he permanently relocated to the Puducherry ashram with his family. He passed away there on 18 May 1984.

== Books ==
- Surmukur (1934)
- Sraddhaspadeshu
- Dadathakur
- Kantapadalipi
- Hasir Antarale (Behind the Laughter)
- Asha Jawar Majhkhane (In the Midst of Coming and Going)
