= Charu Chandra Chakraborty =

Indian writer (1902–1981)

- Born: 23 March 1902; Brahmandanga, Faridpur, Bengal Presidency, British Raj
- Died: 25 May 1981 (aged 79); Calcutta, West Bengal, India
- Education: Hare School, Presidency College
- Occupation: Writer
- Writing career
- Notable awards: Saratchandra Puraskar

Charu Chandra Chakraborty (23 March 1902 — 25 May 1981) was an Indian Bengali fiction writer and novelist. He is commonly known by the pen name Jarasandha.

== Early life and education ==
He was born on 23 March 1902 in Brahmandanga village, Faridpur district (present day in Bangladesh. His father's name was Ambikacharan Chakraborty. After completing his primary school studies, he passed matriculation examination in 1920 from Hare School in Kolkata, securing seventh place and passed his MA in economics from Presidency College.

== Career ==
He started his career as a Deputy District Magistrate in Darjeeling. After thirty years of service in various places, he retired as Superintendent of Alipore Jail in 1960. During this time, while performing duties in various jails, he gained a very deep understanding of the lives of prisoners.

== Literature contribution ==
The tales and stories of the people he saw in the prison during his long career were embodied in his novels. On May 1, 1953, the first part of Louhakpat was published in book form. Later, it was published in four parts one by one.

Notable among his novels are: Tamasi, Pari, Masirekha, Nyaydand, Parashmani, Lakhdar, Chhaya, Nishana, Tritiya Nayan, Hira Chuni Panna, Ashraya, Ekush Baar, Aasar and A Bari O Bari.

His autobiographical work, written in two volumes, is Nisang Pathik. The first volume was published in 1971. He also has six collections of short stories. In addition, he has written some works for children in 'Rangchang', 'Rabibar' 'Yamrajer Bipod' etc.

== Film adaptations ==
In 1958, director Tapan Sinha made a film Louhakapat based on his novel. In 1963, Indian film producer and director Bimal Roy made a Hindi film based on his novel 'Tamsi' titled Bandini and won Best Film Award and National Film Award in 1964. Three films also made based on his story Aparna (1972) by Salil Sen, Shama (1981) by Naeem Basit, Din Jay Kotha Theke (1979) by Khan Ataur Rahman.
