= Kahtey Hain Mujhko Raja =

- Poster
- Directed by: Biswajeet
- Produced by: Biswajeet
- Starring: Biswajeet; Rekha
- Music by: R. D. Burman
- Production company: Jayeeta Movie Arts
- Release date: 2 January 1976
- Country: India
- Language: Hindi

Kahtey Hain Mujhko Raja (transl. They call me king) is a 1975 Bollywood film directed and produced by Biswajeet. The film stars Biswajeet, Rekha in lead roles, along with Dharmendra, Hema Malini, Shatrughan Sinha in special roles. The music was composed by R. D. Burman.

== Cast ==
- Biswajeet as
  - Raja Thakur
  - Rajaram "Raja"
- Rekha as Reena
- Dharmendra as Balram (Guest Appearance)
- Hema Malini as Courtesan (Guest Appearance)
- Shatrughan Sinha as ASP Shankar
- Alka as Radha Thakur
- Bipin Gupta as Thakur
- Nadira as Thakurain
- Abhi Bhattacharya as Randhir Thakur

== Soundtrack ==
Lyrics: Majrooh Sultanpuri

Song	Singer
"Yeh Lo Main Aa Gaya"	Kishore Kumar
"Bam Chik, Cham Chik"	Kishore Kumar
"Aiyo Re, Gaya Kaam Se Tera Deewana, Bahak Gaya Na"	Kishore Kumar, Asha Bhosle
"Maine Kab Chaha Ke Dulha Banunga, Ban Hi Gaya To"	Mohammed Rafi, Asha Bhosle
"Liyo Na Babu Tanik Piyo Na"	Asha Bhosle
"Jiya Mein Toofan Jagake"	Asha Bhosle
