= Yeh Raat Phir Na Aayegi (1966 film) =

Yeh Raat Phir Na Aaygi
- Poster
- Directed by: Brij Sadanah
- Starring: Prithviraj Kapoor; Biswajeet; Sharmila Tagore; Mumtaz
- Music by: O. P. Nayyar
- Release date: 20 May 1966
- Country: India
- Language: Hindi

Yeh Raat Phir Na Aaygi (transl. This night will not come again) is a 1966 Bollywood film starring Prithviraj Kapoor, Biswajeet, Sharmila Tagore, Mumtaz and Sailesh Kumar in key roles. Mumtaz and Sailesh Kumar played negative roles in this movie.

== Plot ==
Ye Raat Phir Na Aayegi is a riveting film about a woman's two-thousand-year-old skeleton mysteriously coming to life as Kiran after it was excavated by Reeta and her assistant, Rakesh, from an archaeological site. As these surreal events unfold, Reeta and her widower father discover that Kiran has returned after two thousand years to claim Suraj, her lover from a past life who is now engaged to Reeta.

== Cast ==
- Prithviraj Kapoor as Professor
- Biswajeet as Suraj
- Sharmila Tagore as Kiran
- Mumtaz as Rita
- Helen as Special Appearance in song Huzoorewala, Jo Ho Ijazat, To Hum Yeh Sare Jahan Se Kehde
- Manohar Deepak as Special Appearance in song Huzoorewala, Jo Ho Ijazat, To Hum Yeh Sare Jahan Se Kehde
- Madhumati as Special Appearance in song Huzoorewala, Jo Ho Ijazat, To Hum Yeh Sare Jahan Se Kehde
- Sailesh Kumar as Rakesh
- Harbans Darshan M Arora as Doctor
- Asit Sen (actor) as Gangaram
- B. M. Vyas as Kiran's father
- M.A. Latif as visiting delegate to ruins
- Sopariwala as foreign reporter visiting ruins

== Soundtrack ==
The songs for the movie were composed by O. P. Nayyar and the lyrics were written by Aziz Kashmiri.

Song	Singer	Raga
"Yahi Woh Jagah Hai"	Asha Bhosle	Rageshree
"Har Tukda Mere Dil Ka"	Asha Bhosle	
"Main Shayad Tumhare"	Asha Bhosle	
"Mohabbat Cheez Hai Kya"	Asha Bhosle	
"Aap Se Maine, Meri Jaan, Mohabbat Ki Hai"	Mohammed Rafi, Asha Bhosle	
"Phir Miloge Kabhi, Is Baat Ka Vada Kar Lo"	Mohammed Rafi, Asha Bhosle	
"Huzoorewala, Jo Ho Ijazat, To Hum Yeh"	Asha Bhosle, Minoo Purushottam	
"Mera Pyar Woh Hai"	Mahendra Kapoor	
