= Sulata Chowdhury =

Indian actress

- Born: Maya Roy Chowdhury; 1945
- Died: 1997
- Occupation: Actress
- Years active: 1960 — 1987

Sulata Chowdhury (1945 – 16 September 1997) was a Bengali actress and theatre personality.

Chowdhury made her film debut with Debarshi Narader Sansar (1960). Her first film as a leading actress was Sudhir Mukherjee's Shesh Paryanta (1960) which was a prominent success at the box office.

== Early life ==
Choudhury was born as Maya Roychowdhury in 1945 in Kolkata, British India. Her father's name was Atal Chandra Roychowdhury. She had a passion for dancing and singing since childhood. Chowdhury learnt dance from Ramnarayan Mishra.

== Career ==
Chowdhury made her film debut with Deborsee Narader Sansar (1960). Chowdhury also acted as heroine in Sesh Paryanta directed by Sudhir Mukherjee. After that she starred in number of films in supporting roles. Satyajit Ray offered her a role in Mahanagar but she could not accept it due to contract problems. She acted in many Bengali films and Utpal Dutt's Little Theatre Group.

== Partial filmography ==
- Shesh Paryanta (1960)
- Dui Bhai (1961) - Madhuri
- Abasheshe (1962)
- Kanna (1962)
- Dada Thakur
- Tridhara (1963) - Keya Saha
- Natun Tirtha (1964)
- Mukhujey Paribar (1965)
- Teen Bhubaner Pare (1969) - Bireshwar's wife
- Rupasi (1970) - Balaram's Second SIL
- Pratibad (1971)
- Janani (1971)
- Jiban Jigyasa (1971)
- Stree (1972)
- Anindita (1972) - Bharati's Cousin's wife
- Roudra Chhaya (1973)
- Sonar Khancha (1973)
- Kaya Hiner Kahini (1973) - Kanchi
- Mouchak (1974)
- Alor Thikana (1974)
- Fuleswari (1974)
- Sansar Seemantey (1975)
- Swayamsiddha (1975)
- Bagh Bondi Khela (1975)
- Sanyasi Raja (1975) - Bilasi Dasi
- Agnishwar (1975) - Padma
- Sei Chokh (1975)
- Dampati (1976)
- Sudur Niharika (1976)
- Bhola Moira (1977)
- Kabita (1977)
- Golap Bou (1977)
- Sabyasachi (1977) - Ma Shuye
- Dadar Kirti (1980) - Phoolmati
- Bhagya Chakra (1980)
- Subarna Golak (1981)
- Mukhujjey Paribar (1986)
- Debika (1987) - (final film role)
