= Usne Kaha Tha =

- Poster
- Directed by: Moni Bhattacharjee
- Based on: Usne Kaha Tha by Chandradhar Sharma Guleri
- Produced by: Bimal Roy
- Starring: Sunil Dutt; Nanda; Durga Khote; Tarun Bose; Asit Sen; Leela Mishra
- Music by: Salil Choudhury
- Release date: 1960
- Country: India
- Language: Hindi

Usne Kaha Tha (transl. He said) is a 1960 Bollywood drama film directed by Moni Bhattacharjee starring Sunil Dutt and Nanda in lead roles. This film is Bhattacharjee's first independent directorial venture. He had previously assisted Bimal Roy on various films, notably Madhumati and Do Bigha Zameen. Bimal Roy produced this film under his banner "Bimal Roy Productions".

The film is based on a renowned Hindi short story of the same name written by Chandradhar Sharma Guleri which was published in 1915 in Saraswati. The writing is critically acclaimed for the "perfection of technique, characterization and effect". However, the film itself "none smooth too takeoff" and did not do well at the box office. This was the debut film of actress, Indrani Mukherjee.

== Plot ==
Nandu lives in a small town with his widowed mother. He is friendly with a local girl, Kamli. Kamli's father falls ill and her family relocates to a bigger town, Ambala. Years later, Kamli's father passes away and they return.

Nandu and Kamli fall in love and want to marry. When Nandu's mother goes to meet Kamli's uncle, she is humiliated because of their poverty. Nandu decides to join the army, with the hope that her uncle will consider him suitable enough to get Kamli married to him. But when he returns, Kamli is set to marry someone else. He goes back to the army to try to forget Kamli. He is surprised to find that his superior officer, Ram Singh, is Kamli's husband. Disappointed with his fate, he knows not what to do.

The war starts and he is called for it. But before going on war, Kamli takes a promise from him to protect her husband, which he does. When Ram Singh asks a dying Nandu why he risked his life to save him, his last words are, "Usne Kaha Tha", giving the raison d'être, hence the name of the film.

== Cast ==
- Sunil Dutt as Nandu
- Nanda as Kamli
- Rajendra Nath as Randheera
- Durga Khote as Nandu's mother
- Tarun Bose
- Asit Sen
- Leela Mishra
- Indrani Mukherjee as Farida
- Baby Farida
- Kartar Singh as Sikh man sweet shop owner
- Rashid Khan as Khairati chacha

== Music ==
All lyrics are written by Shailendra; all music is composed by Salil Choudhury.

Songs
No.	Title	Singer(s)	Length
1.	"Aaha Rimjhim Ke Yeh Pyaare Pyaare Geet Liye"	Talat Mahmood, Lata Mangeshkar
2.	"Machalti Aarzoo Khadi Baahen Pasaare"	Lata Mangeshkar
3.	"Chalte Hi Jaana"	Manna Dey, Mohammad Rafi
4.	"Jaanewaale Sipaahi Se Poocho"	Manna Dey, Sabita Mukherjee
5.	"Balkhaati Sharmaati Aaja"	Mohammad Rafi, Sabita Banerjee
