= Chahat =

- Theatrical release poster
- Directed by: Moni Bhattacharjee
- Screenplay by: Dhruv Chatterjee
- Story by: Dhruv Chatterjee
- Produced by: G. M. Roshan
- Starring: Biswajeet; Mala Sinha; Jeetendra; Mumtaz
- Cinematography: A. Bhattacharya
- Edited by: Das Dhaimade
- Music by: Laxmikant–Pyarelal
- Production company: New Film Corporation
- Release date: 24 September 1971
- Running time: 115 minutes
- Country: India
- Language: Hindi

Chahat (transl.Desire) is a 1971 Hindi-language romance film, produced by G. M. Roshan under the New Film Corporation banner and directed by Moni Bhattacharjee. It stars Biswajeet, Mala Sinha, Jeetendra, Mumtaz in lead roles and the music was composed by Laxmikant–Pyarelal. This is the only Black & White film of Jeetendra in his entire career.

== Plot ==
Ashok's mother died soon after delivery, which is considered a bad omen. Ashok's father happens to be an addict of alcohol and more concerned with himself than the child, and in due course remarries. Ashok loves the stepmother so much, that his love and affection is reciprocated by the step-mother, unlike others. Ashok, in the course of time gets a stepbrother Arun. Both the children love each other, surprising all people around in spite of being stepbrothers. Geeta, a girl in the neighborhood, is a constant visitor giving company to both Ashok and Arun. Arun's mother has a brother, always teasing Ashok and trying to poison the mind of his sister, but Arun's mother invariably rebukes her brother and take sides with Ashok, whom she loves more than her own son. As usual, the father happens to come home late in the night completely drunk, tipsy and even rowdy, Very often he assaults his second wife, whenever she cautioned him about his behavior so that both the children may not get prejudiced against him. The children, of course, watched the fathers behavior, realize the miserable plight of their mother and many a time, Ashok gets upset and asks his mother why she does not protest, and the mother pacifies him to keep cool. One night, when the father returned drunk and belabors the mother Ashok comes out of his room and stands between them and protests against the father. Father gets furious against the impertinent son Ashok and in trying to hit the boy slips down the stairs and succumbs to his injuries, Both mother and son get stunned at the suddenness of the fatal accident. However, the mother gives a different report to the police to save Ashok, saying that her husband had an accidental fall being drunk and tipsy before anybody could help him. But Ashok starts developing a complex that he has really killed his own father. Both the children grow up and the girl Geeta too, and they are always seen together as three inseparable friends. Geeta loves Ashok and he becomes aware of it, but they do not recognize the fact that the younger brother Arun thinks that Geeta loves him only. Geeta's affection and tenderness towards Arun is misconstrued as love and he believes that Geeta also loves him and he has no idea that Geeta loves none else but Ashok. Both the families of Ashok and Geeta go for a change to a hill station and Geeta is accompanied by her cousin so that Arun could fall in love with her. Deepavali festival comes in between and the same is celebrated with all pomp and grandeur and as luck would have it, a cracker lit by Ashok explodes in Arun's face, and when taken to the hospital, he was declared to have lost his eyesight. This is the second incident in the family that makes Ashok feel responsible and he looks completely shattered and bewildered. Ashok, all the same, devoted more time towards his blind brother to keep him ever cheerful and gay, he employs an Ustad to teach him to play instruments and takes him for other functions to keep Arun busily occupied. Ashok discovers that Arun loves Geeta. Arun even asked Ashok to negotiate with Geeta's parents for the alliance. Ashok is in a dilemma as he and Geeta love each other. But being forced by circumstances, he decides to make a sacrifice. Ashok probes the subject to Geeta, who is equally shocked and expresses that she could never marry Arun, whom she considered as her brother. Ashok gets adamant and disappointed with Geeta and asks her never to visit his house again and consider him dead as far as she is concerned. Ashok tells Arun different stories about Geeta that she is seriously ill and could not propose, and a day comes when Ashok announces Geeta to be dead thinking that time alone will heal the temporary wound that is created by news of Geeta's death. Ashok accompanies Arun to parties and all functions throughout India to keep him away from Geeta. However, Geeta could not guess the reason for the absence of Ashok and Arun from the house. She confesses to the mother who is equally stunned at Ashok fostering the lie not to shock his brother Arun whom, Geeta never loved. She insists that Geeta meet Arun and make a clean breast of the entire situation and avoid further complications and Geeta manages to meet Arun. Arun gets surprised that his brother had told him Geeta was dead. He never knew why Ashaok lied to him. Arun charges Ashok and now even believes that Ashok deliberately killed his father and at the same time, made him blind. But, Ashok had no answer.

== Cast ==
- Jeetendra as Arun
- Mala Sinha as Geeta
- Biswajit as Ashok
- Mumtaz as Sheela / Baby
- Roopesh Kumar
- Sunder
- Achala Sachdev
- Asit Sen
- Jayshree T.
- Madhumati

== Soundtrack ==
#	Title	Singer(s)
1	"Aa Tu Na Ja Aesi Rut Mein"	Asha Bhosle
2	"Raat Dulhan Bani Chand Dulha Bana"	Lata Mangeshkar
3	"Ruby O Ruby"	Mukesh, Lata Mangeshkar
4	"Humen Tumse Tumhen Humse Shikayat"	Mohammed Rafi, Asha Bhosle
