= Hariyali Aur Rasta =

- Directed by: Vijay Bhatt
- Written by: Dhruva Chatterjee (Story & screenplay); Qamar Jalalabadi (dialogue); Moosa Kaleem (dialogue director)
- Produced by: Shankerbhai Bhatt
- Starring: Manoj Kumar; Mala Sinha; Shashikala; Om Prakash
- Cinematography: Bipin Gajjar
- Edited by: Pratap Dave
- Music by: Shankar Jaikishan; Shailendra (lyrics); Hasrat Jaipuri (lyrics)
- Production company: Shri Prakash Pictures
- Release date: 1962
- Running time: 168 min
- Country: India
- Language: Hindi
- Box office: Rs. 1,90,00,000

Hariyali Aur Rasta (English: The Greenery and the Road) is a 1962 Hindi film produced and directed by Vijay Bhatt. It stars Manoj Kumar and Mala Sinha in lead roles. The film has music by Shankar Jaikishan. The movie marked as the first hit for Manoj Kumar.

== Plot ==
Hariyali Aur Rasta is a triangular love story between Shankar (Manoj Kumar), Shobhana (Mala Sinha), and Rita (Shashikala). The marriage of Rita and Sankar was arranged in their childhood, though when they grow up, Shankar falls in love with Shobhana, though he eventually ends up marrying Rita, as per their family's desires. They both cannot reconcile to the ill-fitting marriage, and the situation deteriorates further when ex-flame Shobhana comes into their lives once again.

== Cast ==
- Manoj Kumar as Shanker
- Mala Sinha as Shobna / Kamla
- Shashikala as Rita
- Om Prakash as Joseph
- Helen as- Dancer Dolly
- Manmohan Krishna as Shivnath
- Surendra

== Production and crew ==
The film was shot extensively in Darjeeling, especially in the Ging Tea and Rangeet Tea Estates.

- Production: Gamanlal Bhatt
- Assistant Director: Arun Bhatt, Haren Ghosh
- Art Direction: Shri Krishna Achrekar, Kanu Desai
- Choreography: Satyanarayan
- Costume: Gaffar Behl

== Soundtrack ==
The soundtrack includes the following tracks composed by Shankar Jaikishan, and with lyrics by Shailendra and Hasrat Jaipuri, together they created songs such as "Ibteda-e-Ishk Mein Hum Saari Raat Jaage", Allah Jaane Kya Hoga Aage" sung by Mukesh and Lata, plus a perennial Diwali hit; "Lakhon Taare Aasman Mein Ek Magar Dhunde Na Mila", "Dekh Ke Duniya Ki Diwali Dil Mera Chup Chap Jala" again by Lata and Mukesh.

Hariyali Aur Rasta

Soundtrack album by Shankar Jaikishan
- Released: 1962 (India)
- Genre: Film soundtrack
- Label: His Master's Voice
- Producer: Shankar Jaikishan

Shankar Jaikishan chronology
Professor (1962)	Hariyali Aur Rasta (1962)	Dil Tera Diwana (1962)

#	Song	Lyrics	Singer (s)
1	"Teri Yaad Dil Se Bhulaane Chala Hoon"	Shailendra	Mukesh
2	"Allah Jaane Kya Hoga Aage"	Hasrat Jaipuri	Lata Mangeshkar, Mukesh
3	"Yeh Hariyali Aur Yeh Rasta"		Lata Mangeshkar
4	"Parwano Ki Raah Mein"		Asha Bhosle
5	"Kho Gaya Hai Mera Pyar"	Hasrat Jaipuri	Mahendra Kapoor
6	"Ek Tha Raja Ek Thi Rani"	Shailendra	Lata Mangeshkar
7	"Dil Mera Chup Chap Jala"		Lata Mangeshkar, Mukesh
8	"Bol Meri Taqdeer Mein Kya Hai- I"	Shailendra	Lata Mangeshkar
9	"Bol Meri Taqdeer Mein Kya Hai - II"	Shailendra	Lata Mangeshkar, Mukesh
