= Dada Thakur (1962 film) =

- Directed by: Sudhir Mukherjee
- Produced by: Shyamlal Jalan
- Starring: Chhabi Biswas; Biswajit Chatterjee; Sulata Chowdhury; Tarun Kumar; Chhaya Devi
- Music by: Hemanta Mukherjee
- Distributed by: Jalan Productions
- Release date: 1962
- Running time: 153 minutes
- Country: India
- Language: Bengali

Dada Thakur (also Dadathakur) is a 1962 Bengali biographical film directed by Sudhir Mukherjee. It is based on the life of publisher, editor and satirist Sarat Chandra Pandit (popularly known as Dada Thakur), starring Chhabi Biswas in the title role. At the 10th National Film Awards, it won the National Film Award for Best Feature Film.

== Plot ==
The film is closely based on the life of the real-life Dada Thakur, and was made in his lifetime. Dada Thakur (Chhabi Biswas) starts his career with a hand-operated press, assisted by his wife (Chhaya Devi). Later he is joined by Nalini Kanta Sarkar (Tarun Kumar), an underground freedom-fighter. Dada Thakur brings out the newspaper Jangipur Sangbad. He campaigns against social evils, earning the ire of the ruling classes. He saves a girl, Lata (Sulata Chowdhury), from the unwanted advances of Darpanarayan (Biswajit Chatterjee), the scion of the local zamindar. Lata joins the ranks of freedom fighters working with Sarkar. Subsequently, a reformed Darpanarayan too becomes an ardent follower of Dada Thakur and joins the struggle for India's freedom. Dada Thakur's greatest success comes when he helps an ordinary man, a petty shopkeeper, to get elected as the Municipal Commissioner of Jangipur.

Later, Dada Thakur has to close down Jangipur Sangbad but soon starts another publication Bidushak. While hawking the journal on the streets of Calcutta, the British police charge at him. However, he is rescued by Subhash Chandra Bose, the then mayor of Calcutta.

The film ends on a tragic note when Dada Thakur witnesses the killing of Darpanarayan by the British. His death brings tears in the eyes of Dada Thakur for the first time. He prays in agony that the soil of Bengal may produce more such devoted young fighters, for ultimate victory is to be achieved through their efforts.

== Cast ==
- Chhabi Biswas as Dada Thakur
- Biswajit Chatterjee as Darpanarayan
- Chhaya Devi as Dada Thakur's wife
- Tarun Kumar as Nalini Kanta Sarkar
- Sulata Chowdhury as Lata
- Bhanu Bandyopadhyay

== Crew ==
- Direction - Sudhir Mukherjee
- Production - Shyamlal Jalan
- Music - Hemanta Mukherjee
- Audiography - Satyen Chatterjee

== Production ==
The casting of the film was done in 1957. Biswajit, who made his debut with this film, recalls: "There was a family-like atmosphere prevailing in the entire unit then. I fondly recollect one night when I was having disturbance in sleeping due to mosquito bites. We were shooting outdoors. Chhabi Biswas, like a parent figure, took care personally, putting up a mosquito net and covered me with a blanket."

== Reception ==
When released, the film enjoyed both commercial and critical success. The performance of Chhabi Biswas (a biopic of Sarat Pandit) in Dada Thakur was described as "memorable" in an article on upperstall.com. It is said that Sarat Pandit himself praised Biswas' portrayal. Biswas' death in a road accident shortly before the film's release undoubtedly played a role in its commercial success. At the 10th National Film Awards, it won the top prize, ahead of the better known films Abhijan, directed by Satyajit Ray, and Sahib Bibi Aur Ghulam, produced by Guru Dutt and directed by Abrar Alvi. It also won a couple of BFJA Awards, including Best Indian Film.

== Preservation ==
The film has been restored and digitised by the National Film Archive of India.

== Awards ==
=== 10th National Film Awards ===
- National Film Award for Best Feature Film

=== BFJA Awards (1962) ===
- Best Indian Films
- Best Audiography - Satyen Chatterjee
