= Baazi (1968 film) =

- Directed by: Moni Bhattacharjee
- Produced by: Tony Walker
- Starring: Dharmendra; Waheeda Rehman; Johnny Walker; Helen
- Music by: Kalyanji-Anandji
- Release date: 1 November 1968
- Running time: 141 minutes
- Country: India
- Language: Hindi

Baazi is a 1968 Bollywood thriller film directed by Moni Bhattacharjee. It stars Dharmendra, Waheeda Rehman, Johnny Walker, Helen. The music of the film was composed by Kalyanji-Anandji.

== Plot ==
Elizabeth D'Souza's uncle is in deep financial crisis. He somehow manages to prove his own death and cremate someone else's body in order to claim 250 thousand rupees (a huge amount during the 1960s) from an insurance company. Inspector Ajay unfolds the mystery.

== Cast ==
- Dharmendra as DSP Ajay
- Waheeda Rehman as Elizabeth D'Souza
- Johnny Walker as Joe
- Helen as Suzy Fernandez
- Shammi as Lucy Fernandez
- Keshto Mukherjee as Madhav
- Manmohan as Ramesh
- Chand Usmani as Maya
- Nazir Hussain as Father Gonsalvez
- Nisar Ahmed Ansari as Doctor
- Amar as Da Silva/Prakash
- Nazir Kashmiri as Prakash's father
- Niranjan Sharma as Police Superintendent
- Manmohan as Ramesh

== Soundtrack ==
Song	Singer
"Aa Mere Gale Lag Ja"	Lata Mangeshkar
"Main Haseena Nazneena, Main Sameena Mahjabeena"	Lata Mangeshkar, Asha Bhosle
"Dil Toota, Roye Naina"	Asha Bhosle
"Pyar Ki Yeh Baaten"	Asha Bhosle
"Ek Anar, Do Beemar"	Manna Dey
