= Bandini (film) =

- Directed by: Bimal Roy
- Written by: Nabendu Ghosh (screenplay); Paul Mahendra (dialogue)
- Based on: Tamasi by Charu Chandra Chakraborty
- Produced by: Bimal Roy
- Starring: Nutan; Ashok Kumar; Dharmendra
- Cinematography: Kamal Bose
- Edited by: Madhu Prabhavalkar
- Music by: Sachin Dev Burman
- Production company: Bimal Roy Productions
- Release date: 1963
- Running time: 157 minutes
- Country: India
- Language: Hindi

Bandini (translation: Prisoner) is a 1963 Hindi drama film directed and produced by Bimal Roy. It stars Nutan, Ashok Kumar and Dharmendra. The film tells the story of a woman prisoner serving life imprisonment for murder, Kalyani, the all-suffering, selfless, sacrificing and strong yet weak Indian woman. She must make a choice between two very different men, Devendra (Dharmendra), the loving prison doctor, and Bikash (Ashok Kumar), a man from her past.

The film is based on the Bengali novel Tamasi by Jarasandha (Charu Chandra Chakrabarti), a former jail superintendent who spent much of his career as a jailor in Northern Bengal, and wrote many fictional versions of his experiences.

Bandini was the tenth highest grosser of the year and was declared a 'Semi Hit' by Box Office India. It swept that year's Filmfare Awards, winning six awards in all, including the top awards of Best Film and Best Director, as well as Best Actress, and is still considered a landmark movie of the 1960s, especially being the last feature film of the director Bimal Roy.

== Plot ==
The film is set in a prison around 1934 in pre-Independence India, where Kalyani is serving life imprisonment for committing a murder, and we learn the circumstances of her crime in a series of flashbacks as she divulges it to the jailor. The film is set in Bengal in the 1930s, during the British Raj, where Kalyani is the daughter of the postmaster of the village, who falls in love with a freedom fighter, Bikash, who later leaves her in the village promising to come back but never does. Society treats them harshly. Broken by her father's misery and that of her own, Kalyani moves to the city, while the song "O Jaanewale Ho Sake To Laut Ke Aana" plays. In the city, she works as a caretaker of an obnoxious and mentally unstable woman, who turns out to be the wife of Bikash. Kalyani learns that her father came to the city looking for her and died in an accident. This prompts her to poison her lover's wife, identifying her as the cause of her miseries in a moment of insane rage.

Back from the flashback in jail, Deven, the jail doctor falls in love with her. Kalyani is not ready for it and starts to stay away from him. They are always shown with a partition in between after Deven proposes her. Another symbolism used in the movie is the occasional shouting of "All is well" by the prison guard when nothing in the movie is; and just as Kalyani is leaving prison for good, she receives yet another ironic message from a jail official, "Ab ghar grihasthi ki jail mein qaid rahogi!" (Now you will be imprisoned in the jail of household!) In the end, she finds Bikash at a ship harbour where she finds him in an ill condition. She then decides to take care of Bikash and her love is again reborn.

== Cast ==
- Nutan Behl as Kalyani
- Ashok Kumar as Bikash Ghosh
- Dharmendra as Devendra (Prison Doctor)
- Raja Paranjpe as Kalyani's Father
- Tarun Bose as Mahesh Chandra
- Asit Sen as Shambu
- Chandrima Bhaduri – Jail warden
- Moni Chatterjee – Inspector
- Kanu Roy as Dr. Verma, Manorama Nursing Home
- Sulochana Latkar
- Hiralal as Superintendent
- Iftekhar
- Bela Bose
- Satyendra Kapoor
- Sulochana Chatterjee as Devendra's mother
- Raj Verma

== Production ==
Writing

The screenplay of the film was written by Nabendu Ghosh, who had previously done the Bimal Roy films Devdas (1955) and Sujata (1959). It was based on the story Tamasi by Jarasandha, pen name of Charu Chandra Chakraborty, a former jail superintendent who wrote many stories based on his career as a jailor in Northern Bengal, including many fictional versions of his experiences, Louha-Kapat (1953), Tamasha (1958) and Nyaydanda (1961), effective creating a new genre in Bengali literature of prison stories.

The principal photography of the film took place at Mohan Studios in Mumbai, with some parts in Naini Central Jail, Yerwada Central Jail and Bhagalpur Central Jail, and the climax scene on the banks of the Ganga River at Sahibganj, in present Jharkhand.

== Music ==
Bandini

Soundtrack album by S. D. Burman
- Released: 1963 (India)
- Genre: Film soundtrack
- Label: EMI Records
- Producer: S. D. Burman

S. D. Burman chronology
Meri Surat Teri Ankhen (1963)	Bandini (1963)	Ziddi (1964)

The soundtrack includes the following tracks, composed by S. D. Burman, with lyrics by Shailendra. The film also marks the debut of Gulzar, who was working as an assistant director on the film as a film lyricist, initially having refused Bimal Roy on the offering, saying that he didn't want to become a lyricist, Gulzar relented only after the film's music director S.D. Burman convinced him so, and he wrote the song "Mora Gora Ang Lai Le", sung by Lata, in five days. The rest of lyrics are by Shailendra, who gave classics like the haunting "Mere Sajan Hain Us Paar" in the bardic voice of S.D. Burman himself, Mukesh's sad song "O Jaanewale Ho Sake", where Burman uses Bhatiyali with a variation.

The songs depict the situation, like a prisoner singing an ode to an imprisoned bird, "O Panchhi Pyare", sung by Asha Bhosle and Asha Bhosle's "Ab ke Baras Bhej Bhaiya ko Babul" composed in Raga Pilu, uses the folk idiom of a traditional song of a newly married girl longing for her maternal home, (maika), but being sung by a prison inmate of Kalyani, immediately conveys the irony in its placement.

Song	Singer
"Mora Gora Ang Lai Le"	Lata Mangeshkar
"Jogi Jabse Tu Aaya"	Lata Mangeshkar
"Ab Ke Baras Bhej"	Asha Bhosle
"O Panchhi Pyare"	Asha Bhosle
"O Janewale Ho Sake"	Mukesh
"Mat Ro Mata"	Manna Dey
"O Mere Majhi"	S. D. Burman

== Awards ==
- 11th National Film Awards
  - Best Feature Film in Hindi
- 11th Filmfare Awards
  - Best Film: Bimal Roy
  - Best Story: Jarasandha
  - Best Actress: Nutan
  - Best Director: Bimal Roy
  - Best Cinematographer: Kamal Bose
  - Best Sound: Dinshaw Billimoria
