= Jahan Ara (film) =

- DVD cover
- Directed by: Vinod Kumar
- Starring: Bharat Bhushan; Mala Sinha
- Music by: Madan Mohan
- Distributed by: Light and Shade
- Release date: 1964
- Country: India
- Language: Hindi
- Box office: ₹ 1,10,00,000

Jahan Ara is the 1964 Indian Hindi debut film of director Vinod Kumar. It stars Prithviraj Kapoor, Bharat Bhushan, Mala Sinha, and Shashikala in lead roles. The film is a historical romance based on the life of Jahanara Begum, played by Mala Sinha. It was the first time this character was portrayed on-screen.

The movie did not do well at the box office.

== Plot ==
Mirza Yusuf Changezi and Jahan Ara have been good friends since childhood. Things are not quite the same as they grow up, as Jahan Ara's father is none other than Emperor Shah Jahan, and men are not permitted to meet with the princess under any circumstances. However, Jahan and Mirza do meet secretly and promise to marry each other. Misfortune visits the emperor, when his wife, Mumtaz Mahal, passes away. The emperor is deeply devastated, and, still mourning his wife's death, he pledges to build a memorial in her name (which would subsequently be called Taj Mahal, one of the seven wonders on Earth). At her deathbed, Mumtaz makes Jahan promise that she will take care of her father, which she promises to do. This responsibility makes her sacrifice her love for Mirza, who is heartbroken and continues to believe that Jahan will sooner or later reunite with him.

== Cast ==
- Prithviraj Kapoor as Shah Jahan
- Bharat Bhushan as Mirza Yusuf Changezi
- Mala Sinha as Jahan Ara
- Shashikala as Karuna
- Om Prakash
- Achala Sachdev as Mumtaz Mahal
- Sunder as Gulley
- Aruna Irani as Panna
- Minoo Mumtaz as Roshan Ara
- Baby Farida

== Awards ==
- Nominated: Filmfare Award for Best Actress (1965), Mala Sinha
- Filmfare Award for Best Art Direction (Color) - Sant Singh

== Music ==
Jahan Ara

Studio album by Madan Mohan
- Released: 1964 (India)
- Genre: Feature film soundtrack
- Label: Saregama

The soundtrack of the film contains songs composed by Madan Mohan, while the lyrics are by Rajinder Krishan.

Song	Singer
"Kisi Ki Yaad Mein"	Mohammed Rafi
"Baad Muddat Ke Yeh Ghadi Aayi"	Mohammed Rafi, Suman Kalyanpur
"Woh Chup Rahe To"	Lata Mangeshkar
"Haal-E-Dil Yun Unhe"	Lata Mangeshkar
"Jab Jab Tumhe Bhulaya, Tum Aur Yaad Aaye"	Lata Mangeshkar, Asha Bhosle
"Ae Sanam, Aaj Yeh Kasam Khayen"	Lata Mangeshkar, Talat Mahmood
"Teri Aankh Ke Aansoo"	Talat Mahmood
"Main Teri Nazar Ka"	Talat Mahmood
"Phir Wohi Sham"	Talat Mahmood

Besides these songs, there is another song "Kabhi Aankhon Mein Teri" sung by the four sisters Lata Mangeshkar, Asha Bhosle, Usha Mangeshkar and Meena Mangeshkar was neither filmed nor released on disc. Arguably, it might be the only song sung by all the Mangeshkar sisters.

- The lyrics of song 'Phir wohi sham, wohi gham, wohi tanhai' are very similar to the lyrics of song 'Phir wohi Chand, wohi hum, wohi tanhai' from 1957 movie Baarish, music & sung by C. Ramchandra.

Several songs are set in Hindustani ragas: "Kisi Ki Yaad Mein" ([[Kedar (raga)|Kedar]]), "Baad Muddat Ke Yeh Ghadi Aayi" (Chhayanat), "Woh Chup Rahe To" (Basant Bahar, with Mishra Malhar), "Haal-E-Dil Yun Unhe" (Miyan Ki Malhar), "Main Teri Nazar Ka" (Khamaj) and "Phir Wohi Sham" (Bageshri).
