= Phir Kab Milogi =

- Poster
- Directed by: Hrishikesh Mukherjee
- Starring: Biswajeet; Mala Sinha; Dilip Kumar (Guest Appearance)
- Music by: R.D. Burman
- Release date: May 3, 1974
- Country: India
- Language: Hindi

Phir Kab Milogi (lit. 'When will you meet me again?') is a 1974 Bollywood romance film directed by Hrishikesh Mukherjee. The music for the film was composed by R.D. Burman.

== Plot ==
Sapna (Mala Sinha) is having fun meeting her employee Rajesh (Biswajit) as Paro, and then, in the city as Sapna; and Rajesh falls for the simplicity of Paro. His heart breaks when he realizes both Sapna and Paro are one.

Rajesh quits his job and goes to a remote village, where he once again meets Sapna, who is now the fiancee of local contractor Diwan Sahab. Sapna is taken hostage by Teja (Dilip Kumar) because of a confusion that she is his sister. The sister, fearing that Teja would kill Sapna, releases her, but Sapna doesn't reach her cottage.

Would Rajesh ever be able to tell her he loved her; more importantly, is Sapna alive?

== Cast ==
- Biswajeet as Rajesh Sharma
- Mala Sinha as Sapna/Paro
- Dilip Kumar as Teja Singh (Guest Appearance)
- Deven Verma as Devi Das
- Abhi Bhattacharya as Colonel
- Neelima as Nilima
- Naaz as Amba
- David Abraham
- Sailesh Kumar
- Sujata
- Bipin Gupta
- Vijaya Choudhury
- Ram Murti Chaturvedi
- Uma Dutt
- Parveen Paul
- Bishan Khanna
- Harbans Darshan

== Soundtrack ==
The soundtrack was composed by R. D. Burman and the credit for the lyrics goes for Majrooh Sultanpuri. The song "Kahin Karti Hogi" was an inspiration taken from "The Lonely Bull" by Herb Alpert. Entire song is different but 'Mukhda' can be called inspired.

#	Song	Singer
1	"Khit Pit Khit Kere"	Kishore Kumar
2	"Kahin Karti Hogi"	Mukesh, Lata Mangeshkar
3	"Le gayi khushboo"	Lata Mangeshkar
4	"Tum mujhse roothe ho"	Lata Mangeshkar
5	"Ram kasam bura nahi"	Lata Mangeshkar
