= Kangan (film) =

- Directed by: K. B. Tilak
- Produced by: M.B. Raj, Jagdish A. Sharma
- Music by: Kalyanji-Anandji
- Release date: 1 August 1971
- Running time: 139 minutes
- Country: India
- Language: Hindi

Kangan (transl. Bangles) is a 1971 Indian Hindi film starring Mala Sinha and Sanjeev Kumar. The film was a remake of the 1963 Telugu film Eedu Jodu, starring Jamuna, Jaggaiah and Gummadi respectively in the roles of Mala Sinha, Sanjeev Kumar and Ashok Kumar.

== Story ==
Sunil lives a middle-classed lifestyle in a village in India along with his widowed mom, Janki. He is studying medicine in the city and is in love with his childhood sweetheart, Shanta and everyone expects them to get married soon. However, Janki does not approve of Shanta, finds her uncouth and illiterate, and instead approves of Shobha and arranges Sunil's marriage with her. Shanta's mom, Parvati, falls seriously ill so much so that Sunil returns home, promises to wed her daughter, and she passes away. Sunil returns to the city to continue and finish his studies. After sometime he becomes a fully qualified doctor and returns to the village to open his own dispensary. It is here that he will learn that Shanta is now married to the wealthiest man in the village, Lakshmipati, who is not only a widower, father of a deceased child, but also much older than Shanta. Watch what happens when an embittered Sunil confronts Shanta to find out why she betrayed him and their promise to her late mom.

== Cast ==
- Dr Sunil / Sonu – Sanjeev Kumar
- Shanta – Mala Sinha
- Lakshmipati Rajaji – Ashok Kumar
- Mehmood - Banke
- Shobha – Aruna Irani
- Hanuman - Jeevan
- Champakali - Shyama

== Music ==
Music given by Kalyanji-Anandji and lyrics written by Anjaan and Verma Malik.

1. "Sataye Sari Raina Kunwaare Kangana" – Lata Mangeshkar
2. "Jhuke Jo Tere Naina" – Mahendra Kapoor, Usha Khanna
3. "Prabhu Ji Mere Avagun Chit Naa Dharo" – Ashok Kumar
4. "Puncture, Yeh Duniya Motor Gadi hai, Koi Chale Na Janter Manter" – Mohammed Rafi, Mehmood
