= Yeh Rishta Na Tootay =

1981 Hindi film

- Directed by: K. Vijayan
- Starring: Rajendra Kumar; Mala Sinha; Vinod Mehra; Bindiya Goswami; Raj Babbar
- Music by: Kalyanji-Anandji
- Release date: 31 July 1981
- Country: India
- Language: Hindi

Yeh Rishta Na Tootay (transl. This Relationship Should Never Be Broken) is a 1981 Indian Hindi-language romantic musical film directed by K. Vijayan. It stars Rajendra Kumar, Mala Sinha, Vinod Mehra, Bindiya Goswami, Raj Babbar in lead roles. The film's music is by Kalyanji-Anandji.

== Cast ==
- Rajendra Kumar as Inspector Vijay
- Mala Sinha as Madhu
- Vinod Mehra as Ram
- Bindiya Goswami as Kiran
- Raj Babbar as Shyam
- Shakti Kapoor as Shakti
- Jagdeep as Bhagwandas
- Kalpana Iyer
- Johnny Lever

== Reception ==
The film garnered 5.0 rating out of 5.0 at Bollywood Movie Database.

== Soundtrack ==
Music of the film was composed by the duo of Kalyanji Anandji and songs were written by Maya Govind and Anjaan.

#	Title	Singer(s)	Lyrics
1	"Rimjhim Saawan Barse, Badal Bijuri Chamke"	Anuradha Paudwal, Suresh Wadkar	Anjaan
2	"Chor Jo Kare Chori To Pakda Jaye"	Alka Yagnik, Manhar Udhas	Anjaan
3	"Aao Aao Sakhiyaan Aao Ri"	Anuradha Paudwal	Maya Govind
4	"Pyaar Bhari Chhaya Mein Beeta Mera Ek EK Pal"	Alka Yagnik, Manhar Udhas	Maya Govind
5	"Aaye The Saath Duniya Mein Jaana"	Mahendra Kapoor	Anjaan
6	"Main Khubsurat Hoon, Har Dil Ki Zaroorat Hoon"	Asha Bhosle	Anjaan
7	"Sadiyon Mein Ek Baar Mile Yar Tere"	Mahendra Kapoor, Suresh Wadkar	Anjaan
