= Do Kaliyan =

1968 Indian film

- Poster
- Directed by: R. Krishnan; S. Panju
- Written by: Javar Seetharaman
- Based on: Kuzhandaiyum Deivamum (1965 film), The Parent Trap (1961 film) and Lisa and Lottie by Erich Kästner
- Produced by: M. Murugan, M. Kumaran, M. Saravanan; M. Balasubramaniam; M. S. Guhan
- Starring: Mala Sinha; Biswajeet; Mehmood; Om Prakash; Neetu Singh
- Cinematography: S. Maruthi Rao
- Edited by: S. Panjabi; R. Vittal
- Music by: Ravi
- Production company: AVM Productions
- Distributed by: Ultra Films
- Release date: 1 March 1968
- Country: India
- Language: Hindi

Do Kaliyaan (pronounced [doː kəlɪjaː̃] transl. Two Buds) is a 1968 Indian Hindi-language film directed by R. Krishnan and S. Panju. The film stars Mala Sinha, Biswajeet, Mehmood, Om Prakash and Neetu Singh, credited as Baby Sonia. It is a remake of the 1965 Tamil film Kuzhandaiyum Deivamum which itself was based on the 1961 American film The Parent Trap, based on Erich Kästner's 1949 German novel Lisa and Lottie (German: Das doppelte Lottchen).

== Plot ==
Proud, wealthy, and haughty Kiran meets down-to-earth middle-class college student, Shekhar, and after several clashes and misunderstandings, both fall in love and decide to get married. Shekhar meets Kiran's dominating mother and docile father, and is told that he must successfully pass a test that by Kiran's mom, to which he agrees and subsequently passes, much to Kiran's delight. The wedding is performed with great pomp and ceremony and Shekhar becomes a ghar jamai. He soon realises that his presence in Kiran's house is next to a lowly servant. He rebels and wants Kiran to leave with him. But Kiran asks him to be patient. Thereafter, she gives birth to identical twin girls, Ganga and Jamuna. Shekhar still feels that they would be better off living away from Kiran's mother. Differences arise between husband and wife, and Shekhar moves out with an infant Ganga. Years later, Ganga and Jamuna meet at a school outing and both decide to switch places to get to know the other's parent. Both girls then devise a scheme that will bring their proud grandmother to her senses, and bring their parents to reconciliation.

== Cast ==
- Biswajeet as Shekhar
- Mala Sinha as Kiran
- Neetu Singh as Ganga and Jamuna
- Mehmood as Mahesh
- Om Prakash as Kiran's Father
- Nigar Sultana as Kamla Devi
- Geethanjali as Menaka
- Manorama as Madhumati
- Hiralal as the contract killer

== Production ==
Do Kaliyan was produced by AVM Productions. It is a remake of the studio's own Tamil film Kuzhandaiyum Deivamum (1965), itself based on the American film The Parent Trap (1961). Kuzhandaiyum Deivamum's director duo Krishnan–Panju returned to direct the Hindi remake. Kutty Padmini, who portrayed twin sisters in the original, was initially signed on to reprise her role, but later replaced with Neetu Singh due to conflicts Padmini had with AVM.

== Soundtrack ==
The songs' lyrics were penned by Sahir Ludhianvi.

| Song | Singer | Raga |
|---|---|---|
| "Tumhari Nazar Kyun Khafa Ho Gayi" (Happy) | Lata Mangeshkar, Mohammed Rafi | |
| "Tumhari Nazar Kyun Khafa Ho Gayi" (Sad) | Lata Mangeshkar, Mohammed Rafi | |
| "Yeh Sama, Yeh Rut, Yeh Nazare" | Lata Mangeshkar, Mohammed Rafi | |
| "Bachche Man Ke Sachche" (Part 1) | Lata Mangeshkar | |
| "Bachche Man Ke Sachche" (Part 2) | Lata Mangeshkar | |
| "Murga Murgi Pyar Se Dekhe" | Lata Mangeshkar | |
| "Chitnandan Aake Naachungi" | Asha Bhosle | Jaunpuri |
| "Sajna O Sajna, Aise Mein Ji Na Jala" | Asha Bhosle | |
| "Muslim Ko Tasleem Arz Hai, Hindu Ko Parnaam" | Manna Dey | |

== Release ==
Do Kaliyan was a major commercial success and, according to film historian Randor Guy, "further brightened the radiant image of Meiyappan and AVM Studios".
