= Aasra =

- Poster
- Directed by: Satyen Bose
- Written by: Satyen Bose
- Starring: Biswajeet; Mala Sinha
- Music by: Laxmikant-Pyarelal
- Release date: 1966
- Country: India
- Language: Hindi

Aasra (lit. 'Shelter') is a 1966 Hindi movie produced by Madan Mohla and directed by Satyen Bose. The film stars Biswajeet, Mala Sinha, Balraj Sahni, Nirupa Roy and Jagdeep. The film's music is by Laxmikant-Pyarelal. The movie is a remake of the 1961 Bengali movie Madhyarater Tara.

== Plot ==
Medical Dr Amar Kumar is an eligible bachelor. His parents are looking for a bride match for him. Amar meets Roopa the daughter of Bishambarnath who considers him a good suitor. Bishambarnath is Surendernath's (Amar's father) old friend. But Amar gets attracted to her distant cousin, Shobha who is treated as a house servant in Bishambhar's household, as she became an orphan after her fathers death and was brought to Bishambhar's home by a neighbour. Bishambhar has 4 other children, than Roopa. Amar gets a chance to go abroad. Meanwhile, Shobha gets pregnant. When it became public, Shobha is thrown out of home after a nice beating.

She escapes from the abusive household and is taken in by Amar's kind parents, without knowing she is pregnant. Later, they came to know about it and are in confusion what to do but Surendernath is again kind enough and let her stay asking Maya if it was their own daughter then what will they do? There is a twist, who is the father? Shobha never reveals the father's name of the child. A baby boy is delivered. Shobha disappears from scene after delivery. The baby is reared by Balraj and Maya until his own daughters who came for a visit, object. Surendernath sends the child somewhere and does not tell anyone. As 2 years have passed, Amar returns. He searches for Shobha but does not find her. Later he learns about Shobha's pregnancy and her child from his own parents. He tells the truth that before going abroad he proposed to Shobha and in love they slept with each other, once. And the child is his own. Surendernath knows where Shobha and child are. He tells Amar and that way whole family is united with a happy note. Parents liked Shobha from beginning except the illegitimate pregnancy details.

== Cast ==
- Biswajeet as Amar
- Mala Sinha as Shobha
- Balraj Sahni as Surendranath
- Nirupa Roy as Maya
- David as Bishambharnath
- Praveen Paul as Mrs. Bishambharnath
- Jagdeep as Harish (Bishambharnath's Eldest Son)
- Ameeta as Roopa (Bishambharnath's Eldest Daughter)

== Soundtrack ==
Lyricist: Anand Bakshi

#	Song	Singer
1	"Daiya Ri Daiya Yashoda Maiya"	Lata Mangeshkar
2	"Neend Kabhi Rehti Thi Aankhon Mein"	Lata Mangeshkar
3	"Tum Kaun Ho, Batao Tumhara Naam Hai Kya"	Lata Mangeshkar
4	"Sajna Kidhar Saari Ratiyan"	Lata Mangeshkar, Usha Mangeshkar
5	"Shokhiyan Nazar Mein Hai"	Mohammed Rafi
6	"Mere Soone Jeevan Ka Aasra Hai Tu"	Asha Bhosle
