= Sarat Chandra Pandit =

Indian columnist, satirist

- Dadathakur in the 1950s
- Born: 27 April 1879; Simlandi, Bhadrapur, Birbhum district, Bengal Presidency, British India (now West Bengal, India
- Died: 27 April 1968 (aged 87); Jangipur, Murshidabad, West Bengal, India
- Occupations: columnist, satirist, humorist, poet, social critic, lyricist
- Writing career
- Genres: humour, poetry, satire, social criticism

Sarat Chandra Pandit (27 April 1879 – 27 April 1968), better known as Dada Thakur (Bengali: দাদাঠাকুর), was a well-known composer of humorous rhymes, writer, publisher and social critic. He had his ancestral house at Dafarpur in West Bengal, India. However, the ancestral seat of the Pandits were originally at Dharmapur, a village in Rampurhat subdivision, Birbhum District of West Bengal. Sarat Chandra Pandit's grandfather Ishan Chandra Pandit left his ancestral village Dharmapur and settled in Dafarpur following a family conflict.

Sarat Chandra Pandit single-handedly published the newspaper 'Jungipore Sangbad', from Jangipur playing the roles of author, press-compositor, proof-reader and printer. Initially he was assisted by his wife and temporary workers in running the press, a wooden hand-press which was run in his bedroom. He also published 'Bidushak' [বিদূষক] (Jester), a pamphlet of satire, humor and social commentary and used it as his weapon for social change and to bring public awareness against corruption.

== Career ==
He was known for his ability to memorise, ability to compose at will rhymes and songs full of puns and wit. Sarat Chandra Chatterjee gave him the name 'Bidushak Sarat Chandra' in recognition of his very popular humorous compositions. His keen knowledge of both the Bengali, Hindi and English languages made him a unique composer of multilingual rhymes and witticisms. He created much Bengali Palindrome. One of his famous palindromes include:

রাধা নাচে অচেনা ধারা

রাজন্যগণ তরঙ্গরত, নগণ্য জরা

কীলক-সঙ্গ নয়নঙ্গ সকল কী?

কীর্তন মঞ্চ ‘পরে পঞ্চম নর্তকী

Translation:

In an unknown way, Radha's dance unfolds,

Kings enchanted, youth's elixir takes hold,

Eyes with arrow marks, mesmerized they gaze,

Fifth dancer joins the Kirtana stage's blaze.

The local British administrators also became aware of him and his criticism.

== Popular culture ==
The Bengali film Dada Thakur (1962) was made in his lifetime commemorating his life, with Chhabi Biswas playing the titular role of Dadathakur. Although Dadathakur was still living at the time of the release of the movie, Chhabi Biswas died just a short while before that. The movie also marked the debut of the actor Biswajit Chatterjee. This film Dadathakur was also awarded president award in the year 1962.
