= Ujala =

- DVD cover
- Directed by: Naresh Saigal
- Written by: Qamar Jalalabadi (screenplay); Naresh Saigal (story); Manohar Singh Sehrai (dialogues)
- Produced by: F.C. Mehra
- Starring: Shammi Kapoor; Mala Sinha; Raaj Kumar; Leela Chitnis
- Cinematography: Shivram Malaya
- Edited by: Pran Mehra
- Music by: Shankar Jaikishan
- Release date: 1959
- Running time: 109 minutes
- Country: India
- Language: Hindi

Ujala (Light/Luminosity) is a Bollywood romantic crime film released in 1959, starring Shammi Kapoor, Mala Sinha, Raaj Kumar, Leela Chitnis and Tun Tun. Naresh Saigal was the story writer as well as the director. Ujala features one of the popular Bollywood songs "Jhoomta Mausam, Mast Mahina" played by Shammi Kapoor and Mala Sinha, sung by Manna Dey and Lata Mangeshkar. The film came with a message; "Honesty always triumphs". The film's music was by Shankar–Jaikishan, with lyrics by Shailendra and Hasrat Jaipuri.

== Plot ==
Ramu (Shammi Kapoor), his family consisting of his mother (Leela Chitnis) and three siblings, and his sweetheart Chhabili (Mala Sinha) are poor, but they dream of a better life and keep trying to achieve it. In the process, his childhood friend and villain in the movie Kalu (Raaj Kumar) creates obstacles for his ambitions.

Ramu is dragged into an evil world, where Kalu makes him realize that it is easy money to rob someone; honesty apparently has no value. Ramu gets pulled into this world when his sister meets with a car accident. He needs money for her treatment and she dies due to the lack of it. Ramu now joins Kalu and his gang. Kalu kills one of his gang members who betrayed him. Kalu convinces Ramu that he may get blamed for the murder so Ramu goes into hiding. He works for a man making knives from where Kalu steals a silver knife, which belongs to a police officer. This implicates Ramu further where he's again on the run. After a final fight with Kalu, Ramu is able to prove his innocence.

== Cast ==
- Shammi Kapoor as Ramu
- Mala Sinha as Chabeli
- Raaj Kumar as Kalu
- Leela Chitnis as Ramu's mother
- Dhumal as Bholu
- Kumkum as Kammo
- Ramesh Sinha as Police Inspector
- Shivraj as Acharya
- Asrani (uncredited cameo)

== Trivia ==
Raaj Kumar was unhappy that none of the songs were picturized on him; they were instead picturized on Shammi Kapoor, a rising superstar of the late '50s. To remedy this, Naresh Saigal, the director, created a friendship song between the two male stars "Yaaron Surat Hamari Pe Mat Jaao" which was sung by Mukesh and Mohammed Rafi, with lyrics by Shailendra.

== Music ==
The film score is composed by the musical duo Shankar–Jaikishan. The lyrics were written by Shailendra and Hasrat Jaipuri.

No.	Title	Lyrics	Singer(s)	Length
1.	"Jhoomta Mausam, Mast Mahina"	Hasrat Jaipuri	Manna Dey, Lata Mangeshkar
2.	"Tera Jalwa Jisne Dekha"	Hasrat Jaipuri	Lata Mangeshkar
3.	"Duniya Walaon Se Door"	Shailendra	Mukesh, Lata Mangeshkar
4.	"Ab Kahan Jaye Hum" (Raga Darbari Kanada)	Shailendra	Manna Dey
5.	"O Mora Nadan Balma"	Hasrat Jaipuri	Lata Mangeshkar
6.	"Suraj Jara Aa Pass Aa"	Shailendra	Manna Dey
7.	"Yaaron Surat Hamari Pe Mat Jaao"	Shailendra	Mukesh, Mohammed Rafi
8.	"Chamm Chamm"	Hasrat Jaipuri	Manna Dey, Lata Mangeshkar
