= Apne Huye Paraye =

1964 film

- Directed by: Ajit Chakraborty
- Produced by: Ajit Chakraborty
- Starring: Manoj Kumar; Mala Sinha
- Music by: Shankar Jaikishan
- Release date: 1964
- Country: India
- Language: Hindi

Apne Huye Paraye is a 1964 Indian Bollywood film produced and directed by Ajit Chakraborty. It stars Manoj Kumar and Mala Sinha in pivotal roles.

== Plot ==
Young Rekha lives with her widowed mother (Dulari). The five-year-old Lata, who is Rekha's mother's friend's daughter, moves in with them along with her maid after her parents pass away. Rekha is friends with a boy named Shankar. Shankar moves to Kanpur and returns years later as a doctor. Shankar (Manoj Kumar) meets a now grown up Rekha (Mala Sinha) and they fall in love with each other. Rekha is a sweet natured simple young woman, while Lata (Sashikala) is greedy, scheming and ill-tempered. Lata becomes attracted towards Shekhar who does not respond to her overtures. Shankar asks for Rekha's hand for marriage. Rekha's mother happily agrees. Lata with help of her maid manages to entrap Shankar in a compromising position. Shankar pleads his innocence, but Rekha's mother believes Lata. She becomes sick due to the shock. Before dying she makes Shankar promise that he will marry Lata. Shanker initially refuses, but everyone emotionally blackmails him into marrying Lata. Rekha's mother dies and Rekha is left with the burden of a big loan her mother had taken for her marriage. She sells her house and belongings to repay the loan and moves in with her servant Foghat (Agha) whom she considers family. She also gets a job to make ends meet. Meanwhile, Lata and Shanker's married life is not going smoothly as Shekhar does not love Lata and Lata constantly fights with him. Shekhar tries to meet Rekha, but she refuses to meet him. One day, Rekha falls seriously ill and Foghat ends up asking for Shankar's help as a doctor. This creates doubts in Lata's mind that Rekha and Shankar are having an affair. To catch them red handed, Lata hatches a plan and makes Rekha move in with her. Things come to a head when both Shankar and Foghat are not at home and Lata's maid puts poison in a glass of water meant for Rekha. Lata unknowingly drinks the water and dies. The police believe Rekha to be guilty of poisoning her rival in love. The case moves into the court and things look bleak for Rekha. Meanwhile, Lata's conniving maid tries to secretly leave the city, but ends up having a fatal accident. In her deathbed, she finally breaks down and confesses to accidentally poisoning her mistress. Rekha and Shankar finally get together again.

== Cast ==
- Manoj Kumar...Dr. Shankar
- Mala Sinha...Rekha
- Shashikala...Lata
- Agha...Fohkat
- Lalita Pawar... Rekha's lawyer
- Iftekhar...Public Prosecutor
- Sunder...Makhan

== Soundtrack ==
| # | Title | Singer(s) |
|---|---|---|
| 1 | "Bahar Banke Woh" | Lata Mangeshkar |
| 2 | "Gagan Ke Chanda Na Poochh Humse" | Subir Sen, Lata Mangeshkar |
| 3 | "Phir Koyi Muskaraya" | Mukesh |
| 4 | "Maine Bulaya Aur Tum Aaye" | Lata Mangeshkar |
| 5 | "Dupatte Kee Girah Me Bandh Lijiye" | Mukesh |
| 6 | "Apne Hue Paraye Kismat Ne Kya Din Dikhlaye" | Lata Mangeshkar |
| 7 | "Kahi Aansoo Nikalte Hai Haaye Mujhe Loot Liya" | Asha Bhosle |
