= Geet (1970 film) =

- Poster
- Directed by: Ramanand Sagar
- Produced by: Ramanand Sagar
- Starring: Rajendra Kumar; Mala Sinha
- Music by: Kalyanji Anandji
- Production company: Sagar Arts
- Release date: 18 September 1970
- Country: India
- Language: Hindi

Geet (transl. Song) is a 1970 Indian Hindi-language romantic musical film directed by Ramanand Sagar. A remake of the 1969 Bengali film Chirodiner, the film stars Rajendra Kumar, Mala Sinha and Sujit Kumar. The film's music is by Kalyanji Anandji.

== Plot ==
Kamla is a successful stage performer who lives with her widowed father Dindayal in Delhi. She works in the company owned by Kunver Shamsher Singh, who wants to marry her, but couldn't express his feelings. After a heavy schedule, she wants to take a break and goes to Kulu. There, she becomes interested in a local cattle herder, Sarju after listening to his song. They spend time together and Kamla gradually becomes fascinated by him. Before she starts back, Sarju finally proposes her and she gladly accepts. But the question arises regarding their different backgrounds and at last Kamla agrees to come and stay with him in Kulu. She returns to Delhi to finish her committed shows.

There, she informs Kunver about her marriage and retirement, which leaves him devastated. He finally expresses his feelings and asks Kamla to reconsider. Kamla tells him that she can't do anything now, though she sympathizes with him. After some days, Sarju suddenly appears in Delhi along with his sister Janki, asking for work as his sister's engagement was broken. Kamla introduces him to her boss Kunver, who was already quite jealous of Sarju. He tries to disapprove of Sarju's appearance, but approves of him after a makeover. Kamla and Sarju's pair performs stage shows and their records sell in great numbers. They settle Janki's marriage with businessman Ashok and decide to conduct two weddings at the same time.

But her boss, filled with jealousy arranges an accident to kill Sarju. Sarju survives, but can't speak due to a head injury. They conduct Janki's marriage and sends her to her husband's house. Kamla cares for Sarju and wants to marry him as soon as he improves. Kunver further plans to separate Kamla and Sarju by killing her father and making Sarju a prime suspect. Seeing Sarju standing with a knife in his hand beside her father's dead body, even Kamla believes that he killed her father due to mental instability. She sends him to his sister's house, but Sarju leaves Janki's house too. He works as a construction worker where his boss listens to him playing a flute and invites him to play on the radio.

Kamla agrees to marry Kunver at last, on one condition, that he shouldn't hand over Sarju to police on charges of murder. But Kunver plans to remove Sarju from the picture, and sends goons to kill Sarju. Sarju escapes and succeeds to find his voice again. He brings police to arrest Kunver and Kamla learns the truth; that Kunver was the real killer of her father. Kamla and Sarju reunite and move to Kulu.

== Remakes ==
The film was later remade into Telugu as Aradhana, starring N. T. Rama Rao and Vanisri. Geet was the longest running film in Sri Lanka's history - for any language film - where it had a run of 604 days at Crown Cinema Colombo. Bangladeshi film Prem Geet (1993) was also remade from Geet.

Some people mention that the Sinhalese film Chandi Putha which was made in Sri Lanka in 1977 was influenced by the story of this film, despite the original melodies of the songs.

== Cast ==
- Rajendra Kumar as Suraj "Sarju" Kumar
- Mala Sinha as Kamla "Kamal"
- Nasir Hussain as Dindayal
- Sujit Kumar as Kunver Shamsher Singh
- Kumkum as "Jankho"
- Manmohan Krishna as Laxminarayan
- Daisy Irani as Laxminarayan's daughter
- Bhagwan as Dindayal's cook
- Brahm Bhardwaj as Doctor
- Keshto Mukherjee as Keshav
- Paro as Radha
- Chaman Puri as Stage Musician
- Tun Tun as Champavati "Champa"

== Soundtrack ==
Music of the film was composed by the duo of Kalyanji Anandji and songs were written by three lyricists namely Anand Bakshi, Hasrat Jaipuri and Prem Dhawan.

#	Title	Singer(s)
1	"Bansuri Bajai Ke"	Suman Kalyanpur
2	"Tere Naina Kyon Bhar Aaye" (Male)	Mahendra Kapoor
3	"Jo Dil Mein Basai Thi"	Asha Bhosle
4	"Laila Majnu : Opera"	Mohammed Rafi, Asha Bhosle
5	"Mere Mitwa Mere Meet Re"	Mohammed Rafi
6	"Jiske Sapne Humen Roj Aate Hai"	Lata Mangeshkar, Mahendra Kapoor
7	"Tere Naina Kyon Bhar Aaye"	Lata Mangeshkar
8	"Mere Mitwa Mere Meet Re"	Lata Mangeshkar, Mohammed Rafi
