= Mujhe Jeene Do (1963 film) =

1963 film by Moni Bhattacharjee

- Film poster
- Directed by: Moni Bhattacharjee
- Written by: Aghajani Kashmeri
- Produced by: Sunil Dutt
- Starring: Sunil Dutt; Waheeda Rehman
- Music by: Jaidev (Music); Sahir Ludhianvi (Lyrics)
- Production company: Ajanta Arts
- Release date: 1963
- Running time: 180 minutes
- Country: India
- Language: Hindustani

Mujhe Jeene Do (transl. Let Me Live) is a 1963 Indian Hindi film, directed by Moni Bhattacharjee and written by Aghajani Kashmeri. This dacoit drama stars Sunil Dutt, Waheeda Rehman, Nirupa Roy, Rajendranath and Mumtaz.

Shot in the Chambal Valley ravines of Bhind-Morena under police protection in Madhya Pradesh state, the film highlights the acting talents of its star cast: Waheeda Rehman and Sunil Dutt. The music is by the composer Jaidev. It was the seventh highest grossing Bollywood film of the year, and the official selection at the 1964 Cannes Film Festival. The film was also the second success in a row of actor Sunil Dutt's production banner, Ajanta Arts, after Yeh Rastey Hain Pyar Ke, which had been released earlier that year. Mujhe Jeene Do was India's third "dacoit" film, a genre loosely inspired by Hollywood westerns, but more so by the menace of dacoity in Central India in the early 1960s.

== Synopsis ==
A story about how love can lead to the redemption of even a hardened criminal like Thakhur Jernail Singh, who is a noted dacoit in Chambal Valley.

One night, he happens to meet Chameli a courtesan (tawaif), at a wedding she was performing at. They elope and fall in love, later they have a son. But their romance is short-lived as he is about to be captured by the police, that is when Jernail sends Chameli away to a neighbouring village to raise their son, as he is sure of his end.

Unfortunately, the village she goes to has an old grudge to settle and attacks the hapless mother and son as a mob, but the police save them in time, and even promises them the seized property of Jernail.

== Cast ==
- Sunil Dutt as Thakur Jarnail Singh
- Waheeda Rehman as Chameli Jaan
- Nirupa Roy as Champa
- Durga Khote as Dara Khan's Mom
- Rajendra Nath as Dara Khan
- Manorama as Chamelijaan's Mom
- Siddhu as Thakur Kirpal Singh
- Anwar Hussain as Phool Singh
- Tarun Bose as Superintendent of Police
- Kumari Naaz as Chauthi Begum (as Naaz)
- D.K. Sapru as Zamindar
- Mumtaz as Farida - Dhara's Sister
- Wasi Khan
- Mohan Choti as Kripal Singh's Goon
- Madhumati as item number
- Cuckoo as item number
- Krishan Dhawan as School-teacher
- Asit Sen as Pandit Ram Avtar
- Rashid Khan as Maulana Sheikh Rahim
- Dulari as Phool Singh's Wife

== Soundtrack ==
The music of Jaidev, coupled with lyrics by Sahir Ludhianvi, add to the tragic nature of the film. Also standing out is the cheerful song Nadi Naare sung by Asha Bhosle, noted for perfect rendition of the high-pitched song.

#	Title	Singer(s)
1	"Nadi Naare Na Jao Shyam Pai Padoon"	Asha Bhosle
2	"Ab Koi Gulshan Na Ujde"	Mohammed Rafi
3	"Tere Bachpan Ko Jawani Ki Dua"	Lata Mangeshkar
4	"Mohe Na Yoon Ghoor Ghoor Ke Dekho"	Lata Mangeshkar
5	"Raat Bhi Hai Kuch Bheegi Bheegi"	Lata Mangeshkar
6	"Moko Peehar Mein Mat Chhed"	Asha Bhosle
7	"Maang Mein Bhar Le Rang Sakhi Re"	Asha Bhosle

== Reception ==
The film was a major success, like the earlier two other big films in the same genre, Ganga Jamuna (1961) and Raj Kapoor's Jis Desh Mein Ganga Behti Hai (1960). Sunil Dutt's performance was highly appreciated and found his performance terrific.

== Awards ==
- 1964 Filmfare Best Actor Award: Sunil Dutt
- 1964 Cannes Film Festival: Official selection, in competition for awards

== See also ==
- Aag Ka Darya (film), a 1966 Pakistani remake
