= LG Film Awards =

LG Cine Circle Awards is an award ceremony for Nepali movies organised by Cinema Circle Nepal.
