= Moni Bhattacharjee =

Indian film director and screenwriter

- Born: Moni Bhattacharya; Bengal Presidency, Birth India
- Other name: M. Bhattacharjee
- Occupations: Film director, screenwriter
- Years active: 1958–1970

Moni Bhattacharjee was an Indian film director and screenwriter of the 1960s who directed Hindi language films.

== Career ==
Bhattacharjee started as an assistant to Bimal Roy on many classic films of the 1950s. After the success of the film Madhumati (1958), Bimal Roy asked him to direct Usne Kaha Tha, which Roy produced under Bimal Roy Productions label, thus starting Bhattacharjee's career as a fully fledged director. However, Usne Kaha Tha itself was a "none too smooth takeoff". Bhattacharjee went on to direct numerous films, and is best known for the dacoit film, Mujhe Jeene Do (1963), which starred Sunil Dutt and Waheeda Rehman and was among the "Official Selection" at the 1964 Cannes Film Festival.

The Hindu praised Mujhe Jeene Do, writing that the "brilliant synthesis of script, photography, music, lyrics, acting and direction sends you on an emotional rollercoaster". The Illustrated Weekly of India stated that Bhattacharjee was "groomed in the Bimal Roy school", and that his first directorial efforts were not as successful as Mujhe Jeene Do, which "placed him in the top flight of young directors". Of Mujhe Jeene Do, The Link wrote: "The moral of the film is legion, and the acting impeded by Moni Bhattacharjee's confused direction. Only one thing is left. Does it, in all its humbling messiness, ever touch the heart?"

More recently, in 2010, Mujhe Jeene Do was described as a "classic" by The Hindu newspaper.

== Filmography ==
Assistant director
Year	Film	Producer	Notes
1953	Parineeta	Ashok Kumar	
1953	Do Bigha Zamin	Bimal Roy	Filmfare Award for Best Film
1954	Biraj Bahu	Hiten Choudhury	
1958	Madhumati	Bimal Roy Productions	Highest-grossing film of 1958. It garnered 9 Filmfare Awards
1958	Yahudi	Savak B. Vacha	

Director
Year	Film	Producer	Notes
1960	Usne Kaha Tha	Bimal Roy	
1963	Mujhe Jeene Do	Sunil Dutt	Won Filmfare Award for Best Actor
1967	Jaal	A.R. Khan	Also scriptwriter
1968	Baazi	Tony Walker	
1971	Chaahat	G.M. Roshan	

=== Awards and nominations ===
- 1964, nominated for Palme d'Or at Cannes Film Festival for Mujhe Jeene Do
