= Devar Bhaabi =

Indian film

Devar Bhabhi
- Directed by: Kedar Kapoor
- Starring: Balraj Sahni; Rajendra Kumar; Mala Sinha
- Music by: Ravi
- Production company: Royal F. Art
- Release date: 1958
- Country: India
- Language: Hindi

Devar Bhabhi is a 1958 Hindi drama film directed by Kader Kapoor. It stars Balraj Sahni, Rajendra Kumar, Mala Sinha.

== Cast ==
- Balraj Sahni
- Rajendra Kumar
- Mala Sinha
- Leela Mishra
- Ram Mohan
- Sarita

== Soundtrack ==
Song	Singer
"Tasveer Teri"	Mohammed Rafi
"Kise Thi Khabar" (version 1)	Asha Bhosle
"Kise Thi Khabar" (version 2)	Asha Bhosle
"Hazaaron Hasraten"	Asha Bhosle
"Ye Kaisi Rut Aayi"	Asha Bhosle
"Chori Chhup Jaye Re, Dakaiti Chhup Jaye"	Asha Bhosle, Shamshad Begum
"Aankh Ki Andhi"	Manna Dey
