= Bewaqoof =

1960 Indian Hindi-language film

Bewaqoof (Movie)
- Directed by: I. S. Johar
- Written by: I. S. Johar
- Produced by: I. S. Johar
- Starring: Kishore Kumar; Mala Sinha; I. S. Johar; Pran; Leela Chitnis
- Cinematography: Roque M. Layton
- Edited by: M. S. Shinde
- Music by: S. D. Burman
- Release date: 1960
- Country: India
- Language: Hindi

Bewaqoof (Hindi: बेवक़ूफ़, translation: "Idiot") is a 1960 Indian drama film starring Kishore Kumar, Mala Sinha, I. S. Johar, Pran and Leela Chitnis.

== Plot ==
Advocate Rai Bahadur is a respected lawyer who has no children. He has an affair with a prostitute, Meher, who then becomes pregnant with his child. He impregnates his wife at the same time and both his wife and Meher give birth to sons in the same hospital and on the same day. When Rai Bahadur learns that Meher also gave birth to his son, he went to meet her in hospital, but Meher warns him of dire consequences if he will not give his son his due rights. She blackmails him and he asks her to change her baby with his wife's baby. Helpless, Rai Bahadur asks a nurse to change the babies and offered money. The nurse agreed, but later her conscience does not allow her to comply. She did not change the babies, but told Rai Bahadur that she has changed the babies. Now, Rai Bahadur thinks that the boy in his house "Kishore" is from the prostitute Meher and the boy with Meher is from his wife. His wife have fever that timeHe starts to dislike his son "Kishore" in his bungalow and start liking the other one "Pran". He expels Kishore and his mother from the bungalow and brings "Pran" mistaking "Pran" as from his wife. Now "Kishore" is raised in a poor life with both Meher and Mrs Rai Bahadur and "Pran" lives in a bungalow. Both become boxers in the same boxing club. Kishore always betters Pran, but is denied his right every time due to Pran's unfair tricks. Kishore falls in love with Pran's assistant-cum-girlfriend "Mala", who is from a rich family. An LLB student who's a member of the boxing club becomes Kishore's friend and helps him. Kishore wins Mala from Pran. One day Pran is told the truth by the same nurse and to avoid the stigma of being born to a prostitute, then he kills the nurse. He tricks Kishore into the trap and the conviction of murder falls on Kishore. Kishore's friend became a lawyer by then and helps Kishore. He overcomes the false allegations against Kishore. In the end, Kishore gets his rights and his love, Mala.

== Cast ==
- Kishore Kumar – Kishore Kumar
- Mala Sinha – Mala
- I. S. Johar – Johar
- Pran – Pran
- Leela Chitnis – Mrs. Leela Rai Bahadur
- Bipin Gupta – Advocate Rai Bahadur
- Sabita Chatterjee – Meher
- Vinod Mehra - Young Kishore Kumar
- Ramesh Sippy - Young Pran

== Soundtrack ==
Song	Singer (s)
"Tu Tu Tu Jaam Liye Ja Aankhon Se"	Kishore Kumar, Manna Dey
"Michael Hai To Cycle Hai"	Kishore Kumar, Manna Dey, Asha Bhonsle
"Sachh Sachh O Dear Sachh Sachh"	Kishore Kumar
"Tumi Piya Chikara Hoon Hoon Hoon Garsiya"	Kishore Kumar, Asha Bhonsle
"Mubarak Ho Khushiyon Ka Ye Zamana"	Asha Bhonsle, Chorus
"Dhadka Dil Dhak Se Dekha Hai Jab Se"	Asha Bhonsle, Manna Dey
"Dekh Idhar Dekh Tera Dhyan Kahan Hai"	Asha Bhonsle, Manna Dey
"Dildaar Kamandowale Ka Har Teer"	Manna Dey, Shamshad Begum
"Hum To Hain Tum Par Dil Se Fida"	Mohd. Rafi
