= Jaal (1967 film) =

- Poster
- Directed by: Moni Bhattacharjee
- Written by: Moni Bhattacharjee (Script); Dhruva Bhattacharya (Script); Ehsan Rizvi (Dialogue)
- Produced by: A. R. Khan
- Starring: Biswajeet; Mala Sinha
- Cinematography: Apurba Bhattacharjee
- Edited by: Das Dhaimade
- Music by: Laxmikant-Pyarelal
- Distributed by: Kapurchand & Co. (Theatrical)
- Release date: 1967
- Running time: 156 minutes
- Country: India
- Language: Hindi

Jaal is a 1967 Hindi suspense-thriller film directed by Moni Bhattacharjee. The film stars Biswajeet and Mala Sinha in lead roles.

== Plot ==
Inspector Shankar is assigned to investigate the mysterious death of Sunder Singh, whose ship wrecks on a stormy night. Sunder was off to marry Sheila, the daughter of his mother's childhood friend who had long since died. Sheila was raised by her father, who dies of a heart attack when he learns of Sunder's death. Sunder's mother decides to take Sheila to live with her. In denial of her son's death, Sunder's mother keeps doing various acts in madness. She keeps serving food for Sunder, talks with his photos, and keeps feeling that her son has returned. Meanwhile, Shankar and Sheila fall in love. But in her madness, Sunder's mother starts preparations of Sunder's wedding with Sheila. Sunder's face-burnt body is found and the mystery continues whether his death was an accident or a murder.

== Cast ==
- Biswajeet as Inspector Shankar
- Mala Sinha as Sheela
- Sujit Kumar as Sundar Singh
- Nirupa Roy as Sundar's Mother
- Johnny Walker as Prakash
- Helen Prakash's girlfriend
- Asit Sen as Helen's uncle
- Tarun Bose as Micheal
- Jagdish Raj as Police sub-inspector
- Niranjan Sharma as Sheela's Father

== Music ==
The music is composed by Laxmikant-Pyarelal, and the songs are written by Raja Mehdi Ali Khan and Anand Bakshi.

Song	Singer
"Meri Zindagi Ke Chirag"	Lata Mangeshkar
"Dhadka Hai Dil Mein"	Lata Mangeshkar
"Rokna Hai Agar"	Lata Mangeshkar
"Mizaaj-E-Garami Dua Hai Aapki"	Lata Mangeshkar, Mohammed Rafi
"Dil De De, Nahin Nahin, Dil Le Le, Nahin Nahin"	Asha Bhosle, Mohammed Rafi
"Akela Hoon Main"	Mohammed Rafi
