= Love Marriage (1959 film) =

- Poster
- Directed by: Subodh Mukherjee
- Produced by: Subodh Mukherjee
- Starring: Dev Anand; Mala Sinha
- Music by: Shankar Jaikishan
- Release date: 1959
- Running time: 157 minutes
- Country: India
- Language: Hindi

Love Marriage is a 1959 Indian Hindi-language film directed by Subodh Mukherjee. The film stars Dev Anand and Mala Sinha along with Helen.

== Plot ==
Sunil Kumar (Dev Anand) is a star cricket player in his city of Jhansi and lives with his brother's family. Sunil's sister-in-law Uma and her little son have deep affection for him and maintain that Sunil is the reason for their happy family. Soon, Sunil leaves for Bombay to attend a job interview and there, he rents a room to stay. The landlord's daughter Geeta (Mala Sinha) initially dislikes Sunil, but after watching him play cricket, she falls in love with him. They soon get married and go back to Jhansi to live with Sunil's family. But their harmonious life undergoes problem when Sunil's behavior becomes wayward and everyone starts hating him. What reasons are leading to friction between Sunil and Geeta? Why has Sunil become everyone's object of dislike? What secret is Sunil hiding from the world?

== Cast ==
- Dev Anand as Sonu / Sunil Kumar
- Abhi Bhattacharya as Sonu's brother Anil Kumar
- Pranoti Ghosh as Sonu's bhabhi
- Mala Sinha as Geeta
- Helen (actress) as dancer

== Soundtrack ==
Song	Singer(s)	Music director	Lyricist	Raga
"Dheere Dheere Chal Chand"	Mohammed Rafi, Lata Mangeshkar	Shankar Jaikishan	Hasrat Jaipuri	
"Tin Kanashtar Peet Peet Kar"	Mohammed Rafi	Shankar Jaikishan	Shailendra	
"Kahan Jaa Rahe The"	Mohammed Rafi	Shankar Jaikishan	Shailendra	
"She Ne Khela He Se"	Mohammed Rafi	Shankar Jaikishan	Hasrat Jaipuri	
"Kahe Jhoom Jhoom Raat"	Lata Mangeshkar	Shankar Jaikishan	Shailendra	Kirwani
"Hum Jaan Gaye Sarkar"	Lata Mangeshkar	Shankar Jaikishan	Hasrat Jaipuri	
"Dil Se Dil Takraye"	Mohammed Rafi, Geeta Dutt	Shankar Jaikishan	Shailendra	
"Qarib Aao Na Tadpao"	Geeta Dutt	Shankar Jaikishan	Shailendra	
