= Harjaee =

- T-series CD cover
- Directed by: Ramesh Behl
- Produced by: N. Jethwani; Sam Sugnu
- Starring: Shammi Kapoor; Mala Sinha; Randhir Kapoor; Tina Munim
- Music by: Rahul Dev Burman
- Release date: 10 July 1981 (India)
- Country: India
- Language: Hindi

Harjaee (meaning disloyal, unfaithful) is a 1981 Indian Bollywood film directed by Ramesh Behl. It stars Shammi Kapoor, Mala Sinha, Randhir Kapoor and Tina Munim in pivotal roles.

== Plot ==
Ajay Nath comes from a wealthy family, and is prone to playing practical jokes and pranks in order to get his way with this mother and father. In one case he asked one of their family doctors, Dr. Panjabi, to lie to his dad that he has cancer, so that he can accompany his college friends to an outing to Kashmir. He falls in love with fellow collegian Geeta Chopra, who is in love with Shyam. But Ajay's dad, fooled by his illness convinces her to be kind to him, and she becomes friendly with Ajay, both eventually fall in love with each other and want to get married. Then their family gets the news that Ajay really has cancer and has only a few more months to live. Under the changed circumstances, both the Nath and Chopra families are against the marriage of Ajay and Geeta. Will Ajay and Geeta get married? Does Ajay really have cancer or is this another prank?

== Cast ==
- Shammi Kapoor ... Rajnath
- Mala Sinha ... Sharda
- Randhir Kapoor ... Ajay
- Tina Munim ... Geeta Chopra
- Hari Shivdasani ... Mr. Chopra
- Iftekhar ... Dr.Gupta
- Rajendra Nath ... Dr. Punjabi
- Sharat Saxena ... Shyam
- Sunder (actor) ... Shankar
- Mahavir Shah ... Arvind, Ajay's friend
- Akshay Kumar ... boy child garlanding Ajay

== Soundtrack ==
The song 'Tujhsa haseen..' was originally meant for another movie titled 'Zabardast'. However that movie was not made and then Randhir Kapoor requested Pancham Da to give it to him in this movie, as he liked it very much.

Just before the song 'Jeevan me jab aise pal..' there is a scene between Kashmiri man and his son, saying in Kashmiri, "kherishu" means "How are you?" and "varishu" means "I am fine". However, Randhir Kapoor tells Tina Munim that it means "I love you" and "I need you". These Kashmiri words are used in the song then by lyricist Gulshan Bawra.

Song	Singer
"Tere Liye Palkon Ki Jhaalar Bunoon"	Lata Mangeshkar
"Tujhsa Haseen Dekha Na Kahin"	Kishore Kumar
"Yeh Rut Hai Haseen, Dard Bhi Hai Jawaan"	Kishore Kumar
"Kabhi Palkon Pe Aansoo Hai, Kabhi Lab Pe Shikayat Hai"	Kishore Kumar
"Kherishu Varishu"	Kishore Kumar, Asha Bhosle
"Sun Zara Shokh Haseena, Tu Hai Anmol Nagina"	Kishore Kumar, Asha Bhosle
"Mee Raksam, Mee Raksam" (Duet)	Mohammed Rafi, Chandrashekhar Gadgil
"Mee Raksam, Mee Raksam" (Solo)	Chandrashekhar Gadgil
