= Karmayogi (1978 film) =

- Theatrical release poster
- Directed by: Ram Maheshwari
- Written by: Sagar Sarhadi; Ela Maheshwary (dialogues); Verma Malik(lyrics)
- Screenplay by: Binoy Chatterjee; C.J. Pavri
- Produced by: Anil Suri
- Starring: Raaj Kumar; Jeetendra; Mala Sinha; Rekha; Reena Roy
- Cinematography: K. K. Mahajan
- Edited by: M. S. Shinde
- Music by: Kalyanji-Anandji
- Production company: A. R. Productions
- Release date: 15 December 1978
- Running time: 143 minutes
- Country: India
- Language: Hindi

Karmayogi (transl. Supreme Self) is a 1978 Indian Hindi-language action drama film, produced by Anil Suri on A. R. Productions banner and directed by Ram Maheshwari. It stars Raaj Kumar, Jeetendra, Mala Sinha, Rekha and Reena Roy in pivotal roles. The music composed by Kalyanji-Anandji. The film was remade in Telugu as Nipputo Chelagaatam in 1982 with Krishnam Raju, Sharada, Jayasudha in the pivotal roles.

== Plot ==
After being betrayed and swindled by many people, Shankar (Raaj Kumar) becomes bitter. He takes the path of crime which he says will yield what he wants swiftly, money. His wife, Durga (Mala Sinha) is a very religious and pious woman who firmly believes in the teachings of Geeta. Shankar feels that he and Durga cannot live together due to their very different views on life. Hence, he leaves the pregnant Durga along with their older son Mohan (also Raaj Kumar) and shifts to the city of Mumbai. He teaches his son to steal and rob people. The father-son duo commits crimes in association with Keshavlal (Ajit) and his henchman Bhiku Ghasiram (Dheeraj Kumar).

Meanwhile, Durga faces immense hardship. She is forced to leave her home as it has been re-possessed by the court due to the non-payment of loans taken by Shankar against it. Durga gives birth to a son, Ajay (Jeetendra). He is groomed by his mother to be an idealist, with her 'sanskar'. Ajay becomes a lawyer. He also runs a newspaper, named Karmayogi. Ajay is in love with Kiran (Reena Roy), the ward of a Christian priest (Nazir Hussain). The priest had also once helped Durga when she was destitute with the new born Ajay and thus, is a friend of the family. Kiran's older sister Rekha (Rekha) is a club dancer. She sends all of her earnings to the priest for Kiran's education. Rekha knows Mohan and has fallen in love with him. Shanker demands a larger share of the profit from Keshavlal. Keshavlal becomes miffed at this and conspires against Shankar. He tips off the police and Shanker is pursued by the police. In the ensuing chase, Shanker ends up killing a police officer and is condemned to die in the ensuing trial. He makes Mohan promise to get revenge against whoever tipped off the police. Rekha expresses her love for Mohan, but he rejects her due to the promise of vengeance he made to his father.

Eventually, Mohan meets his mother and younger brother, but it is too late for him as he has already avenged his father by killing the conspirators. He follows his father to the gallows. However, in his last moments, his mother comes to him and recites couplets of Geeta. These couplets are not only those belonging to the concept of Karma but also the concepts of soul and rebirth as explained by Lord Krishna.

== Cast ==
- Raaj Kumar as Shankar / Mohan (Double Role)
- Jeetendra as Ajay
- Mala Sinha as Durga
- Rekha as Rekha
- Reena Roy as Kiran
- Ajit as Keshavlal
- Yogeeta Bali as Jyoti (Credit as Yogita Bali, Special Appearance)
- Sudhir Dalvi as Judge Raja Pratap

== Soundtrack ==
#	Song	Singer
1	"Aaj Faisla Ho Jayega, Tum Nahin Ya Hum Nahin"	Kishore Kumar, Asha Bhosle, Mohammed Rafi
2	"Aaiye Huzoor, Aaiye Baithiye"	Asha Bhosle
3	"Mohabbat Hoon, Haqeeqat Hoon"	Asha Bhosle
4	"Ek Baat Kahoon Main Sajna"	Lata Mangeshkar
5	"Tere Jeevan Ka Hai Karmon Se" (Part 1)	Manna Dey
6	"Tere Jeevan Ka Hai Karmon Se" (Part 2)	Manna Dey
