= Mala Sinha =

Indian actress (born 1936)

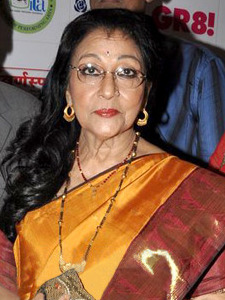
- Mala Sinha in 2013
- Born: Alda Sinha; 11 November 1936 (age 90); Calcutta, Bengal Presidency, British India (present-day Kolkata, West Bengal, India)
- Occupation: Actress
- Years active: 1946–2000
- Works: Full list
- Spouse: Chidambaram Prasad Lohani (m. 1966; died 2024)
- Children: Pratibha Sinha

Mala Sinha (born as Alda Sinha; 11 November 1936) is a former Indian actress who mainly worked in Hindi and Bengali cinema. Renowned for her versatility and graceful screen presence, she is widely regarded as one of the most successful and finest actresses of Indian cinema. Initially starting her career with regional cinema, she went on to become one of the leading and highest-paid actresses of Hindi cinema in the late 1950s, 1960s and early 1970s. Sinha is also known as the "daring diva" and "torch bearer of women's cinema" for essaying strong female centric and unconventional roles in a range of movies considered ahead of their times. Sinha received the Filmfare Lifetime Achievement Award in 2018.

In a career spanning four decades, Mala Sinha rose to prominence with films like Guru Dutt's Pyaasa (1957) and Yash Chopra's Dhool Ka Phool (1959). Later, she starred in over hundred film productions including Phir Subah Hogi (1958), Hariyali Aur Rasta, Anpadh (both 1962), Dil Tera Deewana (1962), Gumrah, Bahurani (both 1963), Himalay Ki God Mein (1965), Aasra (1966), Ankhen, Do Kaliyan (both 1968), Maryada (1971).

Mala was paired multiple times opposite senior and near contemporary actors like Uttam Kumar, Kishore Kumar, Raj Kapoor, Pradeep Kumar, Guru Dutt, Dev Anand, Shammi Kapoor, Raaj Kumar, Rajendra Kumar, as well as junior stars like Dharmendra, Manoj Kumar, Sanjeev Kumar, Biswajeet and Jeetendra. She also acted opposite then newcomers Amitabh Bachchan and Rajesh Khanna . She was the highest-paid actress from 1958 to 1965 with Vyjayanthimala, second with Vyjayanthimala from 1966 to 1967, then shared the second spot with Sharmila Tagore from 1968 to 1971, third position with Sadhana and Nanda in 1972–73.

== Early life ==
Mala Sinha was born to Christian Nepali parents after they immigrated to West Bengal, India from the Nepalese plains. Her father's name was Albert Sinha.

Mala's initial name was Alda and her friends at school in Calcutta (now Kolkata) used to tease her by calling her Dalda (a brand of vegetable oil), so she changed her name to Baby Nazma on getting her first assignment as a child artiste. Later on, as an adult actor, she changed her name to Mala Sinha. As a child, she learnt dancing and singing. Although she was an approved singer of All India Radio, she has never done playback singing in films. As a singer, she has done stage shows in many languages from 1947 to 1975.

== Career ==
Mala Sinha started her career as child artist in Bengali films – Jai Vaishno Devi followed by Shri Krishan Leela, Jog Biyog and Dhooli. Noted Bengali director Ardhendu Bose saw her acting in a school play and took permission from her father to cast her as a heroine in his Bengali film Roshanara (1952), her cinematic debut.

After acting in a couple of films in Calcutta, Mala Sinha went to Bombay for a Bengali film. There she met Geeta Bali, a noted Bollywood actress, who was charmed by her and introduced her to director Kidar Sharma. Sharma cast her as a heroine in his Rangeen Ratein. Her first Hindi film was Badshah opposite Pradeep Kumar, then came Ekadashi, a mythological film opposite Trilok Kapoor. Both films did not do well, but her lead role in Kishore Sahu's Hamlet, paired opposite Pradeep Kumar, fetched her rave reviews in spite of it failing at the box office. Films such as Lai Batti (actor Balraj Sahni's only directorial venture), Nausherwan-E-Adil where she starred as the fair maiden Marcia in Sohrab Modi's romance about forbidden love and Phir Subah Hogi, which was director Ramesh Saigal's adaptation of Dosteovsky's Crime and Punishment established Mala Sinha's reputation as a versatile actress who took the maximum career risks by accepting unconventional roles.

She used to sing for All India Radio; she was not allowed to sing playback (even for herself) in the movies with the lone exception being 1972's Lalkar. In the 1950s, she had string of hits opposite Pradeep Kumar such as Fashion., Detective (1958) and Duniya Na Mane (1959). The films she did with Pradeep Kumar were men-oriented. In 1957, noted Bollywood actor and director Guru Dutt cast Mala Sinha in his film Pyaasa (1957) in a role originally intended for Madhubala. Mala Sinha performed in the relatively unsympathetic part of an ambitious woman who chooses to marry a rich man (played by actor Rehman) and have a loveless marriage, rather than a poor, unsuccessful poet; her impoverished lover (played by Guru Dutt) whom she ditches. Pyaasa remains to this day a classic in the history of Indian cinema and a turning point for Sinha.

After Pyaasa, her major successes were Phir Subah Hogi (1958) and Yash Chopra's directorial debut Dhool Ka Phool, (1959) that elevated her into a major dramatic star. She was part of many successful movies from 1958 to the early '60s such as Parvarish (1958), Ujala, Main Nashe Main Hoon, Duniya Na Mane, Love Marriage (1959), Bewaqoof (1960), Maya (1961), Hariyali Aur Rasta, Dil Tera Deewana (1962), Anpadh and Bombay Ka Chor (1962).

She consistently did lead roles in Bengali films throughout the 1950s to the 1970s. Her performance in films like Lookochoori (1958) opposite Kishore Kumar and Kelaghar (1959), Saathihaara and Shohorer Itikotha.

Sinha's career's best performances were in Bahurani (1963), Gumrah, Gehra Daag, Apne Huye Paraye, Nayi Roshni and Jahan Ara. Apart from pairing with Pradeep Kumar, her pairings opposite Raaj Kumar, Rajendra Kumar, Biswajit and Manoj Kumar in woman-oriented films were appreciated by audiences, with her work opposite Biswajit being the most popular. With Raaj Kumar, she gave box office hits like Phool Bane Angaare, Maryada and Karmayogi and opposite Manoj Kumar, gave commercial successes like Hariyali Aur Rasta, Apne Huye Paraye and Himalaya Ki God Mein. The hits with Rajendra Kumar were Devar Bhabhi, Dhool Ka Phool, Patang, Geet and Lalkar.

With Biswajit, her popular movies include Aasra, Night in London, Do Kaliyaan, Tamanna, Nai Roshni and critically acclaimed films Pyar Ka Sapna, Paisa Ya Pyaar, Jaal and Phir Kab Milogi. She did ten films with Biswajit. In 2007, they won the Star Screen Lifetime Achievement Award, calling them on stage together giving due respect to their popularity as a pair who have tasted box office success.

In her successful 1960s and 1970s roles, she was cast opposite her seniors like Kishore Kumar, Raj Kapoor, Dev Anand and Pradeep Kumar, and the emerging stars from late 1950s like Shammi Kapoor, Rajendra Kumar and Raaj Kumar. She worked with many newcomers of her era including Manoj Kumar, Dharmendra, Rajesh Khanna, Sunil Dutt, Sanjay Khan, Jeetendra and Amitabh Bachchan. Her character's power was as much as the heroes and most of the time her roles were more powerful than the hero. In most of her films from the 1960s, she got first billing in the credits, even before the heroes, with the exceptions being those with Kishore Kumar, Guru Dutt, Raj Kapoor, Dev Anand, Pradeep Kumar.

In 1966, Mala Sinha went to Nepal to act in a Nepali film called Maitighar when the Nepali film industry was still in its infancy. This was the only Nepali film she did in her career. The hero was an estate owner called Chidambar Prasad Lohani.

Soon after, she married C. P. Lohani with the blessings of her parents. From the beginning, theirs was a long-distance marriage with Lohani based in Kathmandu to look after his business and Mala Sinha living in Bombay with their daughter Pratibha. She continued acting after her marriage.

She has been a heroine in many Bengali films. In Bengali films, she has acted with Kishore Kumar and Uttam Kumar. Her last Bengali work as a female lead was Kabita (1977) which featured Ranjit Mullick and Kamal Haasan; it was a super-hit at the box office. She is noted for her strong women-oriented roles in films such as Dhool Ka Phool, Suhag Sindoor, Anpadh, Phir Subah Hogi, Hariyali Aur Rasta, Bahurani, Aasra, Do Kaliyaan, Gumrah, Ankhen, Baharen Phir Bhi Aayengi, Himalay Ki God Mein, Do Kaliyaan, Holi Aayi Re, Nai Roshni, Mere Huzoor, Kangan, Archana, Maryada amongst others.

Of her repertoire, she said in 2001, she was rather partial to Jahan Ara (1964), a historical movie that Meena Kumari passed on to her:

"Meena-ji turned down the role saying that she would not look the part whereas I would. Given my ignorance of Urdu, I was rather sceptical, but Meena-ji was convinced that I could do justice to the role. Playing Mumtaz Mahal's eldest daughter entailed gruelling Urdu classes and learning royal tehzeeb. It was hot on the grand sets erected at Ranjit Studio and the film had Madan Mohan's haunting music. It was a film replete with lyrical moments."

From 1974, she cut down on her assignments as the lead actress in Hindi films. She accepted strong character roles in films like 36 Ghante (1974), Zindagi (1976), Karmayogi (1978), Be-Reham (1980), Harjaee (1981), Yeh Rishta Na Tootay (1981), Babu (1985) and Khel (1992), which were popular.

In the early 1990s, Madhuri Dixit was promoted as the "new Mala Sinha" in magazines. But, after 1994, she completely withdrew from the industry and has given very few public appearances. In Dhool Ka Phool and B.R. Chopra's Gumrah, she played the first unwed mother and adulterous wife respectively in Hindi cinema. As she grew older, she gracefully moved on to doing character roles that befitted her age. She was last seen in Zid (1994). Though Mala evinced as much interest in her daughter Pratibha's career as her father did in her career, she was unable to achieve the same success for her daughter.

In 2013, Sinha refused to receive the local Dadasaheb Phalke Academy Award, because her name was not written or mentioned on the invitation card, unlike in the cards of other honourees such as Asha Bhosle or Yash Chopra. Sinha considered this an insult and did not attend the award ceremony, although she later accepted it in person in her home.

== Income Tax scandal ==
In 1978, during an income tax raid at Mala Sinha's house in Bombay, bundles of cash amounting to ₹ 12 lakh were recovered from a wall in her bathroom, which was a huge amount at the time. Initially, Mala Sinha reportedly told the tax officials that the money had been hidden in the bathroom wall by her father. However, when she was produced before the court during the trial of the case, she reportedly stated that she had earned the money by working as an escort. Mala Sinha is reported to have been scared of losing the money, and is said to have taken the drastic step of admitting to prostitution on the advice of her father and lawyer, Albert Sinha. She made the shocking admission when the court asked her to prove that she had earned the money by fair means. She was allowed by the court to keep the money, but she is said to have lost the favour of her fans, resulting in the loss of many projects in the immediate aftermath. The bold admission is also said to have effectively ended her career that could carry on for many more years.

== Personal life ==
Sinha married Nepali actor Chidambar Prasad Lohani of Kumaoni Brahmin ethnicity in 1966. The couple met when they worked together in the Nepali film Maitighar (1966). Lohani had an estate agency business. After her marriage, she used to come and stay in Mumbai to shoot films while her husband stayed in Nepal running his business. She has one daughter from the marriage: Pratibha Sinha, who is a former Bollywood actress. From the late 1990s, the couple and their daughter have been residing in a bungalow in Bandra, Mumbai. Her mother lived in her house till her death in April 2017. Her daughter takes care of stray dogs and cats at Mala Sinha's home. Her husband, Lohani, died in June 2024.

== Artistry and legacy ==
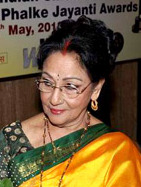
Sinha at an event

Dinesh Raheja of Rediff.com stated, "What is remarkable about Mala Sinha is that most of her 1960s hits were fuelled by her own star power as much as the heros'. When she acted opposite big stars, she made sure her role was as good as theirs." In 2022, she was placed in Outlook India's "75 Best Bollywood Actresses" list. Subhash K. Jha of Firstpost noted, "Mala Sinha was always a daring diva. In Dhool Ka Phool, she was the first unwed mother of Hindi cinema. In Gumrah, she plays a wife who secretly carries on a relationship with the man she loved before marriage. Most of her roles were ahead of its time." One of the highest paid actress of the 1960s, Sinha appeared in Box Office India's "Top Actresses" list five times, from 1962 to 1965 and 1968.

== Awards and nominations ==
Year	Award	Category	Film	Result	Ref.
1965	Bengal Film Journalists' Association Awards	Best Actress (Hindi)	Jahan Ara	Won	
1967	Bengal Film Journalists' Association Awards	Best Actress (Hindi)	Himalay Ki God Mein	Won	
1960	Filmfare Awards	Best Actress	Dhool Ka Phool	Nominated	
1964	Filmfare Awards	Best Actress	Bahurani	Nominated	
1965	Filmfare Awards	Best Actress	Jahan Ara	Nominated	
1966	Filmfare Awards	Best Actress	Himalay Ki God Mein	Nominated	
2018	Filmfare Awards	Lifetime Achievement Award	Herself	Won	
2007	Screen Awards	Lifetime Achievement Award	Herself	Won	

=== Other recognitions ===
- 2004 - Sikkim Samman Award by Government of Sikkim
- 2005 - National Film Awards (Nepal) - Critics Award - Maitighar
- 2013 - Kelvinator GR8! Women Awards: Lifetime Achievement Award
- 2017 - LG Film Award - Special Honour for Maitighar
- 2021 - Deenanath Mangeshkar Vishesh Purashkar: Contribution in Cinema
