= Biswajeet Chatterjee =

Indian actor, producer, director, and politician (born 1936)

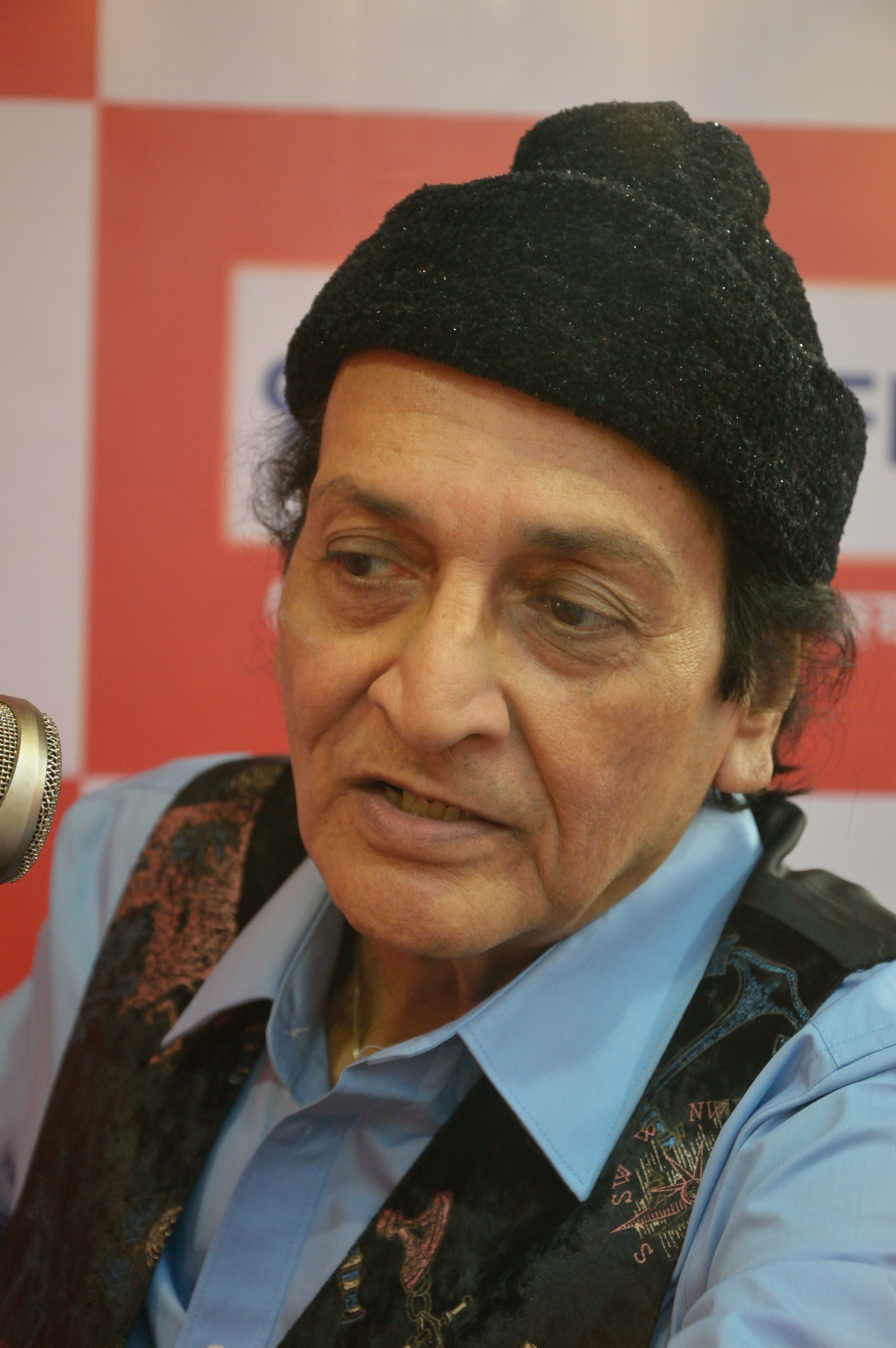
- Chatterjee at the 38th International Kolkata Book Fair in 2014
- Born: 14 December 1936 (age 89); Calcutta, Bengal Presidency, British India
- Occupations: Actor; director; producer; singer; politician
- Years active: 1958–present
- Political party: Bharatiya Janata Party (2019–present); Trinamool Congress (2014–2019)
- Spouse(s): Ratna Chatterjee (divorced); Ira Chatterjee
- Children: 3, including: Prosenjit Chatterjee; Pallavi Chatterjee

Biswajeet Chatterjee (born 14 December 1936), known mononymously as Biswajeet or Biswajit (Bengali: [ˈbiʃodʒit̪]; Hindi: [ˈʋɪʃʋədʒiːt̪]), is a veteran Indian actor, producer, director, singer and politician known for his work in Bengali cinema and Hindi cinema.

== Early career ==
He made his acting debut in the Bengali films with the legendary icon Uttam Kumar in Mayamrigo (1960) and Dui Bhai (1961), both superhits, then he relocated to Bombay. In 1962, he performed in the film Bees Saal Baad which was actually offered first to Uttam Kumar but he rejected and was the first film produced by Hemant Kumar, and then followed by Kohraa, Bin Badal Barsat, Majboor, Kaise Kahoon, and Paisa Ya Pyaar.

His filmography includes Mere Sanam (1965), Shehnai, Aasra (1964), Night in London, Yeh Raat Phir Naa Aaygi (1966), April Fool (1964), Kismat (1968), Do Kaliyan (1968), Ishq Par Zor Nahin and Sharaarat (1972). He was usually paired with notable actresses such as Asha Parekh, Waheeda Rehman, Mumtaz, Mala Sinha and Rajshree.

Biswajit appeared in Rekha's debut film Anjana Safar (1969) (later re-titled Do Shikaari). Though Anjana Safar was blocked by the censors and not released until 10 years later, a scene from the film which shows him kissing Rekha appeared on the pages of the Asian edition of Life magazine. Rekha had complained that during the filming of one of the romantic scenes, Biswajit unexpectedly kissed her for 5 minutes against her will, and the entire crew started cheering and whistling while she was in tears.

Between acting in Bollywood movies, Biswajit has returned to Calcutta to act in Bengali films, including Chowringhee (1968) and Garh Nasimpur with Uttam Kumar and Kuheli and much later, Srimaan Prithviraj (1973), Jai Baba Taraknath (1977) and Amar Geeti (1983).

Apart from acting, Biswajeet also sings and performs in concerts. In the 1970s, he cut a disc of two Bengali modern numbers Tomar Chokher Kajole (1970) and Jay Jay Din (1969), composed by Nachiketa Ghosh and Salil Chowdhury Respectively.

== Later career ==
In 1975, Biswajit produced and directed his own film, Kahte Hai Mujhko Raja. The film besides him starred Dharmendra, Hema Malini, Shatrughan Sinha, and Rekha. He had done one film Anjana Safar with Rekha previously. R.D. Burman composed the music. Later, he went back to acting. He will make a film on Netaji Subash Chandra Bose's life (in Hindi, English and Bengali) and will act in a new untitled Hindi film (murder mystery) with his younger daughter actress Prima Chatterjee. He has also acted in a Hindi Stage Play, Ulta Seedha, produced directed written by wife Ira Chatterjee. In the play, he acted with his daughter Prima.

== Political career ==
In the 2014 general elections, Biswajit contested from New Delhi as an Trinamool Congress candidate. He finished 7th, securing only 909 votes.

In 2019, he joined Bharatiya Janata Party.

== Personal life ==
Biswajit has a son and a daughter by his first wife, the late Ratna Chatterjee. His son Prosenjit and elder daughter Pallavi Chatterjee are also actors in the Bengali Film Industry. Biswajit lives in Mumbai with his second wife, Ira Chatterjee who is producer, director, writer of stage plays and is owner of Dream Theatre. Their daughter, Prima Chatterjee is a film actress, theatre actress and a dance performer.

== Filmography ==
Year	Film	Role
1958	Kangsa	Krishna
1959	Daak Harkaraa	
1960	Maya Mriga	Rajatshubhra
1960	Natun Fasal	
1960	Shesh Paryantra	
1961	Ashay Bandhinu Ghar	
1961	Dui Bhai	Kamal Chatterjee
1961	Kathin Maya	
1962	Mayar Sansar	
1962	Badhu	
1962	Aamar Desh	
1962	Sorry Madam	
1962	Nav Diganta	
1962	Dhoop Chhaya	
1962	Dada Thakur	Darpanarayan
1962	Bees Saal Baad	Vijay "Kumar" Singh Thakur
1963	Akashpradip	
1963	Ek Tukro Agun	
1963	Tridhara	Premadri Lahiri
1963	Hasi Shudhu Hasi Noy	
1963	Bin Badal Barsaat	Prabhat Thakur
1964	Agnibanya	
1964	Kaise Kahoon	Amar
1964	Kohra	Amit Kumar Singh
1964	Godhuli Belaye	
1964	Prabhater Rang	
1964	April Fool	Ashok
1964	Shehnai	Deepak
1964	Majboor	Ravi
1965	Trishna	
1965	Pratham Prem	
1965	Ektuku Chhoan Lage	
1965	Gulmohar	
1965	Do Dil	Manu / Badal
1965	Mere Sanam	Kumar
1966	Monihar	
1966	Aasra	Amar Kumar
1966	Biwi Aur Makan	Arun
1966	Sagaai	Rajesh
1966	Yeh Raat Phir Na Aayegi	Surajprakash
1967	Night In London	Jeevan "Vijay"
1967	Hare Kanch Ki Chooriyan	Ravi Kumar Mehra
1967	Jaal	Inspector Shankar
1967	Nai Roshni	Prakash
1967	Ghar Ka Chirag	
1968	Vaasna	Dr. Shekhar
1968	Kahin Din Kahin Raat	Suraj "Robbie"
1968	Krishna Bhakt Sudaama	Krishna
1968	Chhotto Jignasa	
1968	Do Kaliyan	Shekhar
1968	Chowringhee	Anindya Pakrashi
1968	Garh Nasimpur	
1968	Kismat	Vicky
1969	Pyar Ka Sapna	
1969	Paisa Ya Pyar	Shekhar
1969	Tamanna	
1969	Rahgir	
1970	Pardesi	Ajay
1970	Ishq Par Zor Nahin	Amar Doraiswami
1971	Pratibad	
1971	Chahat	Ashok
1971	Main Sundar Hoon	Amar
1971	Kuheli	Shankar
1972	Chaitali	
1972	Shararat	Harry
1972	Roktakto Bangla	Shaheed
1973	Ami Sirajer Begam	Nawab Siraj ud-Daulah
1973	Mehmaan	Rajesh
1973	Shriman Prithviraj	Akhil Mitra
1974	Do Aankhen	
1974	Prantarekha	
1974	Raktatilak	Roop Singh
1974	Phir Kab Milogi	Rajesh Sharma
1975	Kahte Hain Mujhko Raja	Raja Thakur
1975	Kahte Hain Mujhko Raja	Rajaram "Raja"
1976	Bajrangbali	Rama
1977	Chhotto Nayak	
1977	Bhola Moira	
1977	Baba Taraknath	Scientist
1977	Naami Chor	
1978	Saat Bhai Champa	
1978	Karunamoyee	
1978	Ranger Saheb	
1979	Jai Baba Baidyanath	
1979	Bhagyalipi	
1979	Do Shikaari	Ranjeet
1980	Gori Dian Jhanjran	Kasturilal
1980	Humkadam	Mr. Dutt
1981	Abichar	
1981	Meghmukti	
1982	Sonar Bangla	
1983	Amar Geeti	
1984	Anand Aur Anand	Mr. Thakur
1984	Shorgol	
1985	Saaheb	Mr. Sharma
1985	Harishchandra Shaibya	Maharaj Harishchandra
1986	Krishna-Krishna	Krishna
1986	Allah Rakha	Inspector Anwar
1987	Micha Mayara Sansar	
1987	Nishibasar	
1987	Radha Rani	
1987	Sadak Chhap	Lakshman
1988	Shiv Ganga	Kamdev
1988	Rater Kuheli	
1988	Be Lagaam	
1989	Hal Aur Bandook	
1989	Sansar	
1990	Kayedi	
1990	Zimmedaaar	Chief Inspector
1991	Jigarwala	Ranjeet Singh
1991	Kaun Kare Kurbanie	Police Commissioner
1992	Mehboob Mere Mehboob	Maharaj
1992	Rupban Kanya	Ekabbar Badshah
1993	Dil Apna Aur Preet Paraee	B. N. Sharma
1995	Pyar Do Pyar Lo	
1998	Yeh Na Thi Hamari Qismat	
1998	Ek Tha Dil Ek Tha Dhadkhan	
1999	Sar Ankhon Par	Vishwajeet Chatterjee
1999	Kichhhu Sanlap Kichhu Pralap	
2000	Bharat India Hindustan	James Bond
2001	Dark Night	
2001	Mera Saaya	
2002	Great Target	
2002	Inth Ka Jawab Patthar	Devendra's Adopted Father
2003	Adorini	
2004	Birsa Munda – The Black Iron Man	
2009	Aa Dekhen Zara	Mr. Acharya
2012	Baarood – A Love Story	
2013	Kajra Mohabbat Wala	Anita's Father
2013	Rangbaaz	
2014	Sondhey Namaar Aagey	
2017	Phir Aaya Satte Pe Satta	Mamaji

=== Director ===
Year	Film
1974	Raktatilak
1975	Kahte Hain Mujhko Raja
1981	Abichar
1984	Shorgol

=== Producer ===
Year	Film
1975	Kahte Hain Mujhko Raja
2013	Sorry Madam Maaf Karo

== Awards and honors ==
- Filmfare Awards Bangla 2025 – Lifetime Achievement Award
- Indian Personality of the year at 51st International Film Festival of India (IFFI)
- Lifetime Achievement award at 5th Dehradun International Film Festival (DIFF) in 2019
- Guest of Honour 24th Kolkata International Film Festival (KIFF)
- On 88th birthday of Mohammed Rafi, Chatterjee received Mohammed Rafi Award in Mumbai.
- In 1963, Biswajit received President Gold Medal for film Dada Thakur from President Sarvepalli Radhakrishnan.
