= Dil Tera Diwana (1962 film) =

Dil Tera Deewana
- Directed by: B.R Panthulu
- Written by: Raj Baldev Raj (Dialogues); Inder Raj Anand (Dialogues)
- Story by: Dada Mirasi
- Based on: Sabaash Meena (Tamil)(1958)
- Produced by: B.R Panthulu
- Starring: Shammi Kapoor; Mala Sinha; Mehmood
- Music by: Shankar Jaikishan
- Release date: 1962
- Country: India
- Language: Hindi

Dil Tera Deewana (transl. The Heart's Crazy Over You) is a 1962 Hindi-language comedy film. The film was directed by B.R.Panthulu, and written by Inder Raj Anand and Raj Baldev Raj.

It stars Shammi Kapoor, Mala Sinha, Mehmood, Pran and Om Prakash. The music is by Shankar Jaikishan. The film is black and white in an era where colour films had already started making their appearance. The music of the film was popular. The film was a remake of the Tamil film Sabaash Meena.

== Cast ==
- Shammi Kapoor as Mohan Badriprasad
- Mala Sinha as Meena
- Mehmood as Anokhe / Mohan
- Pran as Ganpat
- Om Prakash as Captain Dayaram
- Mumtaz Begum as Mohan's mom
- Manmohan Krishna as Meena's dad
- Ulhas as Diwan Badriprasad, Mohan's father
- Shubha Khote as Malti
- Mohan Choti as Raja
- Kammo

== Plot ==
Wayward, brash, and disobedient Mohan (Shammi Kapoor) is sent by his angry dad Diwan Badriprasad (Ulhas) to a retired army captain Dayaram (Om Prakash) to learn some discipline and respect. But Mohan asks his friend Anokhe (Mehmood) to switch places with him, and Anokhe agrees to do so. Mohan meets with Meena (Mala Sinha), who lives with her blind dad (Manmohan Krishan). Anokhe is welcomed as Mohan by Captain Dayaram and his daughter Malti (Shubha Khote) in their household. Eventually, both Malti and Anokhe fall in love. Things start to get even more muddled when Captain Dayaram finds out that Anokhe is married to another woman, and that Anokhe drives a rickshaw. The police are notified and they are asked to arrest Mohan - they arrest 3 Mohans. Who is the real Mohan?

== Soundtrack ==
| # | Song | Singer | Raga |
|---|---|---|---|
| 1 | "Dhadakne Lagta Hai Mera Dil Tere Naam Se" | Mohammed Rafi | |
| 2 | "Nazar Bachakar Chale Gaye Woh" | Mohammed Rafi | |
| 3 | "Dil Tera Deewana Hai Sanam" | Mohammed Rafi, Lata Mangeshkar | |
| 4 | "Mujhe Kitna Pyar Hai Tumse" | Mohammed Rafi, Lata Mangeshkar | |
| 5 | "Masoom Chehra, Yeh Qatil Adayen" | Mohammed Rafi, Lata Mangeshkar | Bhimpalasi |
| 6 | "Jaan-E-Wafa Jaan-E-Jahan" | Mohammed Rafi, Lata Mangeshkar | |
| 7 | "Rikshe Pe Mere Tum Aa Baithe" | Mohammed Rafi, Asha Bhosle | |

== Awards ==
- Filmfare Best Supporting Actor Award for Mehmood
