= List of songs by Suman Kalyanpur =

The following is an incomplete list of the songs known to have been recorded and/or performed by Suman Kalyanpur in Hindi. The majority of these songs have featured in Hindi movies. Many of her old songs have featured in various new films (Hollywood or Indian films) & have also been credited. But such songs, unless re-recorded, are not enlisted below.

== Songs ==
Song	Co-singers	Music Director	Lyricist	Movie/Album	Year	Ref(s)
"Ab To Lagat Mora Solvwa Saal"	Solo	Chitragupta	Shailendra	Ganga Maiyya Tohe Piyari Chadhaibo	1963	Bhojpuri Film
"Dinwa Ginat Mori"	Solo	S. N. Tripathi	Ram Murti Chaturvedi	Bidesiya	1963	Bhojpuri Film
"Ban Jaion Piya Ki Jogan"	Solo	S. N. Tripathi	Ram Murti Chaturvedi	Bidesiya	1963	Bhojpuri Film
"Jaan Like Hatheli Par"	Solo	S. N. Tripathi	Ram Murti Chaturvedi	Bidesiya	1963	Bhojpuri Film
"Banwari Ho"	Solo	Chitragupta	Majrooh Sultanpuri	Laagi Nahi Chhute Ram	1963	Bhojpuri Film
"Saj Ke To Gaili Rama"	Solo	Chitragupta	Majrooh Sultanpuri	Laagi Nahi Chhute Ram	1963	Bhojpuri Film
Apne piya ki main to bani re joganiya	Solo	Shivram		Kan Kan mein Bhagwan	1965	
Ai ji ho dekha pyaar tumhara	Solo	Raj Ratan		Dekha Pyaar Tumhara	1963	
Behna ne bhai ki kalayee se pyar bandha hai	Solo	Shankar Jaikishan	Indivar	Resham Ki Dori	1974	
Bujha diye hain khud apne hathon	Solo	Khayyam	Sahir Ludhiyanvi	Shagun	1964	
Chhodo chhodo mori baiyan	Solo	SD Burman		Miyan Biwi Raazi	1960	
Dagabazi piya tere dil mein hai	Solo	Chitragupta	Majrooh Sultanpuri	Aulad	1968	
Dil gham se jal raha hai	Solo	Ghulam Mohammad		Shama	1961	
Mere mehboob na ja	Solo	Jaani Babu Qawwal		Noormahal	1965	
Na tum humein jano na hum tumhe jane	Solo	SD Burman	Majrooh Sultanpuri	Baat Ek Raat Ki	1962	
Sharabi sharabi ye saawan ka mausam	Solo	Roshan	Sahir Ludhiyanvi	Noorjehan	1967	
phoolon ka gazra ye solah singar ho	Solo	Babul		Sara Jahan Humara	1961	
Yun hi dil ne chaha tha	Solo	Roshan	Sahir Ludhiyanvi	Dil hi to hai	1963	
Aapne huzur mujhe kya se kya bana diya	Rafi	Snehal Bhatkar		Fariyad	1964	
Aapse humko bichade hue ek zmana beet gaya	Manhar	Kalyanji Anandji		Vishwas	1969	
Ae jaane tamanna ae jaane bahar	Rafi	Kalyanji Anandji	Hasrat Jaipuri	Ji Chahta Hai	1964	
Agar teri jalwa numayi na hoti	Rafi	Shankar Jaikishan	Hasrat Jaipuri	Beti Bete	1964	
Ajahun na aye balma	Rafi	Shankar Jaikishan	Hasrat Jaipuri	Sanjh Aur Savera	1964	
Ankhiyon ka noor hai tu	Mukesh	Kalyanji Anandji		Johar Mehmood in Goa	1965	
Baad muddat ke ye ghadi aye	Rafi	Madan Mohan		Jahan Ara	1964	
Chura le na tumko yeh mausam suhana	Mukesh	Roshan	Sahir Ludhiyanvi	Dil Hi To Hai	1963	
Din ho ya raat hum rahen tere saath	Rafi	Hansraj Bahal		Miss Bombay	1964	
Jab se hum tum baharon mein	Rafi	Chitragupta		Main Shadi Karne Chala	1962	
Haan maine bhi pyar kiya	Mukesh	Satish Bhatia		Boond Jo Ban Gayee Moti	1967	
Kusum rang lenhga	Rafi	Dattaram		More Man Mitwa	1966	
Manmohan man mein ho tumhi	Rafi and SD Batish	SD Burman		Kaise Kahun	1964	
Mano ya na mano meri zindagi ki bahar ho	Mukesh	Dattaram		First Love	1961	
Mera pyar bhi tu hai ye bahar bhi tu hai	Mukesh	Naushad	Majrooh Sultanpuri	Saathi	1968	
Parbaton ke pedo par	Rafi	Khayyam		Shagun	1964	
Raat suhani jag rahi hai	Rafi	Laxmikant Pyarelal		Jigari Dost	1969	
Thahariye hosh mein aa loon to chale jaiyega	Rafi	Khayyam		Mohabbat Isko Kahte Hain	1965	
Tujhe pyar karte hain karte rahenge	Rafi	Shankar Jaikishan	Hasrat Jaipuri	April Fool	1964	
Tumhi mere meet ho tumhi mere preet ho	Hemant Kumar	Kalyanji Anandji		Pyase Panchhi	1961	
Wo dekho dekho dekh raha tha papiha	Mahendra Kapur	Snehal Bhatkar		Fariyad	1964	
Ye kisne geet cheda	Mukesh	SD Burman		Meri Soorat Teri Aankhen	1963	
Ye mausam rangeen samaan	Mukesh	Ravi		Modern Girl	1961	
Dil gaya to gaya dilruba mil gaya	Shamshad Begum	Ghulam Mohammad		Shama	1961	
Phulwa band mahke dekho lahke daali daali	Geeta Dutt	Hemant Kumar		Hum Bhi Insaan Hain	1959	
Kauni rang mungawa kawani rang motiya	Sudha Malhotra	Roshan		Heera Moti	1959	
Khushiyan Hazar le ke dil ka qarar le ke	Usha Mangeshkar	Usha Khanna		Lal Bangla	1966	
Garjat barsat saawan ayo ri	Kamal Barot	Roshan Roshan		Barsaat Ki Raat	1960	
More saiyan gulabyia ke phool	Minoo Pushottam	Roshan	Neeraj	Nai Umar Ki Nai Fasal	1965	
Na na na re na na haath na lagana	Minoo Prushottam	Roshan	Sahir Ludhiyanvi	Tajmahal	1963	
More Urje Re Nayanva	Mohammed Rafi	Dattaram	Shailendra	Vidhana Naach Nachawe	1968	Bhojpuri film
Dhire Dhire Nayanva	Mohammed Rafi	Dattaram	Shailendra	Vidhana Naach Nachawe	1968	Bhojpuri film
Nirmohi Daga Deke		Robin Chatterjee	Robin Chatterjee	Saiyan Se Bhaile Milanwa	1965	Bhojpuri film
