= List of songs recorded by Mohammed Rafi =

This is a list of songs performed, sung and/or recorded by Mohammed Rafi between 1942 and 1980. Over 5,000 of his songs are listed here. Most are in Hindi but he also sang in several other languages. The genre of song is first, followed by any other singers and the music director or lyricist, then album name and year released.

== Hindi Film Songs ==
- 1940s

| Year | Film | Song | Composer | Singer | Writer |
|---|---|---|---|---|---|
| 1945 | Sharbati Aankhen | Ab Na Been Baja Snehi | Firoz Nizami | Mohammad Rafi | Pandit Indra |
| 1945 | Gaon Ki Gori | Aji Dil Hain Qaboo Mein To | Shyam Sundar | Mohammad Rafi, G. M. Durrani | Wali Sahab |
| 1945 | Hamara Sansar | Ae Dil E Nakaam Tamanna | Govind Ram | Mohammad Rafi | Ramesh Gupta |
| 1946 | Rangbhoomi | Aag Lagi Tan Man Dhan Sab Mein | Prem Nath | Mohammad Rafi, Shamshad Begum | Arzoo Lakhnavi |
| 1946 | Sassi Punnu | Aashikon Ka Kaafil | Govind Ram | Mohammad Rafi, G. M. Durrani | Ishwar Chandra Kapoor |
| 1946 | Safar | Ab Woh Hamarein Ho Gaye | C. Ramchandra | Mohammad Rafi | Gopal Singh Nepali |
| 1946 | Sone Chandi | Ab Ke Bhagwan Daya Karenge | Tufail Faruqui | Mohammad Rafi, Shamshad Begum | Wali Sahab |
| 1948 | Actress | Aye Dil Meri Aahon Mein | Shyam Sundar | Mohammad Rafi | Nakhshab Jarchvi |
| 1948 | Shehnaz | Aye Dil Tujh Ko Neend Na Aayi | Ameerbai Karnataki | Mohammad Rafi | Akhtar Pilibhiti |
| 1948 | Bhakta Gopal Bhaiya | Assi Baras Ka Boodha Baba | Shankar Rao Vyas | Mohammad Rafi | Ramesh Gupta |
| 1948 | Lal Dupatta | Ari O Albeli Naar | Gyan Dutt | Mohammad Rafi, Shamshad Begum | Manohar Khanna |
| 1948 | Amar Prem I | Aao Chala Manwa More Door | Dutt Thakur / Mohan Mishra | Mohammad Rafi, Raajkumari | Kavi Pradeep |
| 1948 | Khidki | Aji Khushiyan Manayein Kyun | C. Ramchandra | Mohammad Rafi, Chitalkar, G. M. Sajan | Pyare Lal Santoshi |
| 1949 | Ek Thi Ladki | Ab Haale Dil Ye Hasle Jigar | Vinod | Mohammad Rafi, Lata Mangeshkar | Aziz Kashmiri |
| 1949 | Balam | Aata Hain Zindagi Mein Bhala Pyar | Husnlal-Bhagatram | Mohammad Rafi, Suraiya | Qamar Jalalabadi |
| 1949 | Naach | Ae Ishq Humein Barbaad Na Kar | Husnlal-Bhagatram | Mohammad Rafi, Suraiya | Sarshar Sailani |
| 1949 | Bazaar | Ae Mohabbat Un Se Milne | Shyam Sundar | Mohammad Rafi, Lata Mangeshkar | Qamar Jalalabadi |
| 1949 | Garibi | Ae Saamne Aane Wale Bata | Bullo C. Rani | Mohammad Rafi, Shamshad Begum | M. G. Adeeb |
| 1949 | Zeverat | Akash Ke Rehne Wale Duniya | Hansraj Behl | Mohammad Rafi | Habeeb Sarhadi |

- 1950s

| Year | Film | Song | Composer | Singer | Writer |
|---|---|---|---|---|---|
| 1950 | Sabak | Aa Ja O Jane Wale | Alla Rakha Qureshi | Mohammad Rafi | Deena Nath Madhok |
| 1950 | Meena Bazaar | Aaye Gori Chupke Se | Husnlal-Bhagatram | Mohammad Rafi, Lata Mangeshkar | Qamar Jalalabadi |
| 1950 | Babul | Aao Aao Sajon Khade Hain Dwar | Naushad Ali | Mohammad Rafi, Talat Mahmood | Shakeel Badayuni |
| 1950 | Khamosh Sipahi | Ab Kis Ko Sunaye Gham Ke Fasane | Hansraj Behl | Mohammad Rafi, Geeta Roy | Deena Nath Madhok |
| 1950 | Apni Chhaya | Ae Jee Zindagi Hain Roshan | Hanuman Prasad | Mohammad Rafi, Shamshad Begum | Pyare Lal Santoshi |
| 1950 | Biwi | Akele Mein Woh Ghabara Te To Honge | Khayyam | Mohammad Rafi | Wali Sahab |
| 1950 | Begaasoor | Ankhiyan Gulabi Jaise | Hansraj Behl / Anil Biswas | Mohammad Rafi, Lata Mangeshkar | Ehsan Rizvi |
| 1950 | Pardes | Ankhiyan Mila Ke Zara Baat Karo Ji | Ghulam Mohammed | Mohammad Rafi, Lata Mangeshkar | Shakeel Badayuni |
| 1950 | Raj Mukut | Apni Nagariya Chhod Ke Raja Mere | Govind Ram | Mohammad Rafi, Shamshad Begum | Bharat Vyas |
| 1951 | Jadoo | Ab Raat Milan Ki Beet Chuki | Naushad Ali | Mohammad Rafi | Shakeel Badayuni |
| 1951 | Aas Ka Panchhi | Ab Char Dino Ki Chhuti | Shankar-Jaikishan | Mohammad Rafi | Hasrat Jaipuri |
| 1951 | Mukhda | Aaja O Janewale Dil Ki Aag Bujha | Vinod | Mohammad Rafi | Aziz Kashmiri |
| 1951 | Maya Machhindra | Andhakaar Mein Jyoti Chhupi Kyun | Prem Nath | Mohammad Rafi | Unknown |
| 1951 | Dhalak | Aei Se Rasiya Ka Kya Awitbaar | Shyam Sundar | Mohammad Rafi, Lata Mangeshkar | Aziz Kashmiri |
| 1951 | Sabz Baagh | Apni Tasveer Se Keh Do | Vinod | Mohammad Rafi, Asha Bhosle | Aziz Kashmiri |
| 1952 | Saqi | Aa Gayi Hain Ishq Pe Bahaar | C. Ramchandra | Mohammad Rafi, Lata Mangeshkar | Rajendra Krishan |
| 1952 | Hungama | Aao Khana Hain Taiyaar | C. Ramchandra | Mohammad Rafi, Chitalkar | Rajendra Krishan |
| 1952 | Sindbad Jahazi | Adaa Se Jhoomte Huye Dilon Ko | Chitragupt | Mohammad Rafi, Shamshad Begum | Anjum Jaipuri |
| 1952 | Bhakti Puran | Andha Manwa Nain Diwane | Chitragupt | Mohammad Rafi | Unknown |
| 1952 | Annadata I | Annadata O Annadata | Mohammad Shafi | Mohammad Rafi, Shamshad Begum | Anjum Jaipuri |
| 1953 | Jhansi Ki Rani | Azadi Ki Yeh Aag Hain Lajawab | Vasant Desai | Mohammad Rafi | Pandit Radheshyam |
| 1953 | Chhora Chhori | Aa Bedardi Baalama | Roshan Lal | Mohammad Rafi, Lata Mangeshkar | Kedar Sharma |
| 1953 | Farmaaish | Aap Ne Cheen Liya Dil | Husnlal-Bhagatram | Mohammad Rafi, Meena Mangeshkar | Qamar Jalalabadi |
| 1953 | Do Bigha Zameen | Ajab Teri Duniya Ho More Rama | Salil Chowdhury | Mohammad Rafi | Shailendra |
| 1953 | Lehrein | Aji Hum Naa Kehte The | C. Ramchandra | Mohammad Rafi | Rajendra Krishan |
| 1953 | Maalkin | Aji Tum Hi Kaho Jee | Roshan Lal | Mohammad Rafi, Kishore Kumar, Ram Kamlani | Rajendra Krishan |
| 1953 | Jhansi Ki Rani | Amar Hain Jhansi Ki Rani | Vasant Desai | Mohammad Rafi | Pandit Radheshyam |
| 1954 | Chakradhari | Aaj Achanak Rooth Ke Mujh Se | Avinash Vyas | Mohammad Rafi | Kavi Pradeep |
| 1954 | Shaheed-E-Azam Bhagat Singh | Aakash Ke Aanchal Mein Sitara | Lachhiram Tamar | Mohammad Rafi | Shauqat Pardesi |
| 1954 | Mehbooba | Aate Jaate Aankh 1 | O. P. Nayyar | Mohammad Rafi, Shamshad Begum | Majrooh Sultanpuri |
| 1954 | Shabab | Aaye Na Balam Wada Kar Ke | Naushad Ali | Mohammad Rafi | Shakeel Badayuni |
| 1954 | Laadla | Aji Darwaza To Kholo | Vinod | Mohammad Rafi, Shamshad Begum | Raja Mehdi Ali Khan |
| 1954 | Dhoop Chhaon | Are Bhai Haay Haay Na Kar | Aziz Hindi | Mohammad Rafi | M. L. Khanna |
| 1955 | Aliadin Ka Beta | Aa Gaya Hain Waqt Maut Ka | S. Mohinder | Mohammad Rafi | Tanveer Naqvi |
| 1955 | Madhur Milan | Aa Ja Aa Ja Re Dekho Raat Aayi | Bullo C. Rani | Mohammad Rafi, Asha Bhosle | Shyam Hindi |
| 1955 | Insaniyat | Aisi Nainwa Ki Laagi Kataar | C. Ramchandra | Mohammad Rafi, Asha Bhosle | Rajendra Krishan |
| 1955 | Riyasat | Aisi Nazarein Na Daal Kar Le | Avinash Vyas | Mohammad Rafi, Geeta Dutt | Prem Dhawan |
| 1955 | Son Of Alibaba | Aise Na Ghoor Ghoor Ke Dekh | Sardul Kwatra | Mohammad Rafi, Geeta Dutt | Prem Dhawan |
| 1955 | Jawaab | Aaj Gham Kal Khushi Hain Yehi | Shaukat Dehlavi Nashad | Mohammad Rafi | Khumar Barabankvi |
| 1955 | Pyara Dushman | Aa Tujh Ko Bulayein Yeh Pyasi | Nisar Bazmi | Mohammad Rafi, Asha Bhosle | Saba Afghani |
| 1955 | Lutera | Aap Ki Nargisi Aankhon Ka Hain | C. Ramchandra | Mohammad Rafi, Asha Bhosle | Rajendra Krishan |
| 1955 | Shahi Chor | Aaye Hain Mehfil Mein Dil Ko | Dhaniram | Mohammad Rafi, Asha Bhosle | Shewan Rizvi |
| 1955 | Society | Ab Aa Bhi Ja Ke Tera Intezar | S. D. Burman | Mohammad Rafi, S. Balbir | Sahir Ludhianvi |
| 1955 | Marine Drive | Ab Woh Karam Karein Ki Sitam | N. Dutta aka Datta Naik | Mohammad Rafi | Sahir Ludhianvi |
| 1955 | Ekadashi | Aao Bhakto Katha Suno Tum | Avinash Vyas | Mohammad Rafi | B. C. Madhur |
| 1955 | Shri Naqad Narayan | Ae Kismat Tere Sad Ke Hum | Vinod | Mohammad Rafi | Pyare Lal Santoshi |
| 1955 | Maano Na Maano | Ae Meri Mehboob Maang Le Jo | Hansraj Behl | Mohammad Rafi, Madhubala Zaveri | Indeevar |
| 1955 | Navratri | Ambe Tu Hain Jagdambe Kaali | Chitragupt | Mohammad Rafi, Asha Bhosle | Bharat Vyas |
| 1955 | Mastani | Ameeron Ke Bhagwan Garibon Ko | Baldev Nath Bali | Mohammad Rafi | Raja Mehdi Ali Khan |
| 1955 | Railway Platform | Andher Nagri Chaupat Raja | Madan Mohan Kohli | Mohammad Rafi, S. D. Batish, Asha Bhosle | Unknown |
| 1955 | Insaniyat | Apni Chhaya Mein Bhagwan | C. Ramchandra | Mohammad Rafi | Rajendra Krishan |
| 1956 | Chhoo Mantar | Ankh Mein Surat Teri Lab Pe | O. P. Nayyar | Mohammad Rafi | Jan Nisar Akhtar |
| 1956 | Jaagte Raho | Ainwe Duniya | Salil Chowdhury | Mohammad Rafi, S. Balbir | Prem Dhawan |
| 1956 | Heer | Aa Jao Tumhein Dil Ka Afsana | Anil Biswas | Mohammad Rafi, Asha Bhosle | Majrooh Sultanpuri |
| 1956 | Mr. Lambu | Aa Mere Dildaar, Kar Le Hum Se | O. P. Nayyar | Mohammad Rafi, Geeta Dutt | Harsh |
| 1956 | Fifty Fifty | Aadhi Tum Kha Lo, Aadhi Hum | Madan Mohan Kohli | Mohammad Rafi, Kishore Kumar | Rajendra Krishan |
| 1956 | Sultan E Alam | Aag Raag Se Aag Laga Do | S. Mohinder | Mohammad Rafi | Tanveer Naqvi |
| 1956 | Halaku | Aaja Ki Intezar Mein Jane Ko | Shankar-Jaikishan | Mohammad Rafi, Lata Mangeshkar | Shailendra |
| 1956 | Raj Hath | Aaye Aaye Re Pawan Mastani | Shankar-Jaikishan | Mohammad Rafi | Hasrat Jaipuri |
| 1956 | Sheikh Chilli | Aaye Jawani Jaye Jawani | Vinod | Mohammad Rafi | Pandit Indra |
| 1956 | Kar Bhala | Ab Koi Jayein Kahan | Nisar Bazmi / Chik Choklet | Mohammad Rafi, Asha Bhosle | Majrooh Sultanpuri |
| 1956 | Chori Chori | All Line Clear, Aage Badho | Shankar-Jaikishan | Mohammad Rafi | Shailendra |
| 1956 | Heer | Allaah Teri Khair Kare | Anil Biswas | Mohammad Rafi | Unknown |
| 1956 | Lalkaar | Angaron Pe Hain Teri Zindagi Ki Gaa | Sanmukh Babu | Mohammad Rafi | Kavi Pradeep |
| 1956 | C. I. D. | Ankhon Hi Ankhon Mein Ishara Ho Gay | O. P. Nayyar | Mohammad Rafi, Geeta Dutt | Majrooh Sultanpuri |
| 1956 | Bhagam Bhag | Ankhon Ko Mila Yaar Se Peene Ka | O. P. Nayyar | Mohammad Rafi, S. D. Batish | Majrooh Sultanpuri |
| 1956 | Sipahsalar | Ankhin Mein Ankhein Daal Ke | Iqbal Qureshi | Mohammad Rafi, Asha Bhosle | Farooq Qaiser |
| 1956 | Shirin Farhad | Ankhon Mein Tumhare Jalwe Hain | S. Mohinder | Mohammad Rafi | Saba Afghani |
| 1956 | Bhai Bhai | Apna Hain, Phir Bhi Apna | Madan Mohan Kohli | Mohammad Rafi | Rajendra Krishan |
| 1956 | Guru Ganthal | Ansoo Na Bahaa Kar Yaad Use | Lachhiram Tamar | Mohammad Rafi | P. Gaafil |

- 1960s

| Year | Film | Song | Composer | Singer | Writer |
|---|---|---|---|---|---|
| 1960 | Saranga | Aa Ja Mere Saathi Aa Ja | Sardar Malik | Mohammad Rafi, Asha Bhosle | Bharat Vyas |
| 1960 | Nayi Maa | Aaj Jung Ke Darr Se | Ravi | Mohammad Rafi, Asha Bhosle | Sarvar |
| 1960 | Mud Mud Ke Na Dekh | Auraton Ke Dibbe Mein Mard | Hansraj Behl | Mohammad Rafi, Suman Kalyanpur | Prem Dhawan |
| 1960 | Lambe Haath | Arre Bus Mein Nazar Takraai | G. S. Kohli | Mohammad Rafi | Anjaan |
| 1960 | Zameen Ke Tare | Aa Gaya Madari Le Ke Jadoo | S. Mohinder | Mohammad Rafi | Anand Bakshi |
| 1960 | Apna Ghar | Aankhan Badi Hain Naimat Babe | Ravi | Mohammad Rafi, Aarti Mukherjee | Prem Dhawan |
| 1960 | Maya Machhindra | Aaj Yahaan Kyun Andhkaar Hain | Ramlal Heerapanna | Mohammad Rafi | Madhur |
| 1960 | Ek Ke Baad Ek | Aayo Yaaro Aayo Pyaro | S. D. Burman | Mohammad Rafi, Asha Bhosle | Kaifi Azmi |
| 1960 | Baabar | Agar Hum Na Hote | Roshan Lal | Mohammad Rafi, Manna Dey, Asha Bhosle, Sudha Malhotra | Sahir Ludhianvi |
| 1960 | Barood | Aise Na Mooh Chhupao | Khayyam | Mohammad Rafi, Lata Mangeshkar | Hasrat Jaipuri |
| 1960 | Baraat | Aji Ab Kehna Maan Jao | Chitragupt | Mohammad Rafi, Geeta Dutt | Majrooh Sultanpuri |
| 1960 | Basant | Aji Ullat Ko Khushiyon Ki | O. P. Nayyar | Mohammad Rafi, S. D. Batish, Asha Bhosle | Qamar Jalalabadi |
| 1960 | Yeh Basti Yeh Log | Aji Yun Lo Na Angadei | Bhole Shreastha | Mohammad Rafi | Prem Warbartani |
| 1960 | Police Detective | Ae Mera Dil Churane Wale Dhoke | Chitragupt | Mohammad Rafi, Geeta Dutt | Prem Dhawan |
| 1960 | Mughal E Azam | Ae Mohabbat Zindabad | Naushad Ali | Mohammad Rafi | Shakeel Badayuni |
| 1960 | Love In Simla | Alif Zabar Ah | Iqbal Qureshi | Mohammad Rafi, Sudha Malhotra | Rajendra Krishan |
| 1960 | Mitti Mein Sona | Ankhon Se Ankk Mili | O. P. Nayyar | Mohammad Rafi, Asha Bhosle | Raja Mehdi Ali Khan |
| 1960 | Apna Haath Jagannath | Apne Haathon Ko Pehchaan | S. D. Burman | Mohammad Rafi | Kaifi Azmi |
| 1960 | Kala Bazar | Apni To Har Aaha Ik Tufan Hai | S. D. Burman | Mohammad Rafi | Shailendra |
| 1961 | Hum Dono | Abhi Na Jao Chhod Kar Yeh Dil Abhi | Jaidev | Mohammad Rafi, Asha Bhosle | Sahir Ludhianvi |
| 1962 | Professor | Aye Gulbadan Aye Gulbadan | Shankar-Jaikishan | Mohammad Rafi | Hasrat Jaipuri |
| 1962 | Professor | Awaz De Ke Humein Tum Bulao | Shankar-Jaikishan | Mohammad Rafi, Lata Mangeshkar | Hasrat Jaipuri |
| 1962 | Baat Ek Raat Ki | Aaj Ka Din Bhi Phika Phika Gham Mei | S. D. Burman | Mohammad Rafi, Asha Bhosle | Majrooh Sultanpuri |
| 1963 | Pyar Ka Bandhan | Abhi Zindagi Ke Sahare Bahot Hain | Ravi | Mohammad Rafi, Asha Bhosle | Naqsh Lyallpuri |
| 1964 | Aya Toofan | Abhi Kamsin Ho Nadaan Ho Jaan-E-Jaa | Laxmikant-Pyarelal | Mohammad Rafi | Asad Bhopali |
| 1964 | Beti Bete | Aaj Kal Mein Dhal Gaya Din Hua Tama | Shankar-Jaikishan | Mohammad Rafi, Lata Mangeshkar | Shailendra |
| 1965 | April Fool | Aa Gale Lag Ja, Mere Sapne Mere Apn | Shankar-Jaikishan | Mohammad Rafi | Shailendra |
| 1965 | Shaheed | Aye Watan Aye Watan | Prem Dhawan | Mohammad Rafi | Prem Dhawan |
| 1966 | Biradari | Abhi Na Phero Nazar Zindagi | Chitragupt | Mohammad Rafi | Prem Dhawan |
| 1966 | Nai Umar Ki Nai Fasal | Aaj Ki Raat Badi Shokh Badi Natkhat | Roshan Lal | Mohammad Rafi, Asha Bhosle | Gopal Das Neeraj |
| 1967 | Ram Aur Shyam | Aaj Ki Raat Mere Dil Ki Salaami Le | Naushad Ali | Mohammad Rafi | Shakeel Badayuni |
| 1968 | Brahmachari | Aaj Kal Tere Mere Pyar Ke Charchay | Shankar-Jaikishan | Mohammad Rafi, Suman Kalyanpur | Shailendra |
| 1969 | Talaash | Aaj Ki Junli Raat Ma Ho Ho | S. D. Burman | Mohammad Rafi, Lata Mangeshkar | Majrooh Sultanpuri |

- 1970s

| Year | Film | Song | Composer | Singer | Writer |
|---|---|---|---|---|---|
| 1970 | Suhana Safar | Aa Ha Aa Ha Aa Yeh Suhana Safar Ruk | Laxmikant-Pyarelal | Mohammad Rafi | Anand Bakshi |
| 1970 | Haj Ka Mahina Aa Gaya | Aa Gaya Lo Aa Gaya Haj Ka Mahina | Mami Bhachu | Mohammad Rafi | Anwar Farukhabadi |
| 1970 | Bachpan | Aya Re Khilone Wala Khel Khilone | Laxmikant-Pyarelal | Mohammad Rafi, Asha Bhosle | Anand Bakshi |
| 1970 | Aan Milo Sajna | Aan Milo Sajna | Laxmikant-Pyarelal | Mohammad Rafi, Lata Mangeshkar | Anand Bakshi |
| 1970 | Raaton Ka Raja | Aana to Sajni Din Ko Aana Sapno | R. D. Burman | Mohammad Rafi | Majrooh Sultanpuri |
| 1970 | Murder On Highway | Aap Jab Yaad Karenge Hum Ko | C. Arjun | Mohammad Rafi | Unknown |
| 1970 | Rootha Na Karo | Aap Ka Chehra Masha Allah Zulg | C. Ramchandra | Mohammad Rafi, Asha Bhosle | Hasrat Jaipuri |
| 1970 | Tum Haseen Main Jawaan | Aap Ko Pehle Bhi Kahin Dekha Hain | Shankar-Jaikishan | Mohammad Rafi, Asha Bhosle | Hasrat Jaipuri |
| 1970 | Pagala Kahin Ka | Ae Mere Dil Yahan Tu Akela Nahin | Shankar-Jaikishan | Mohammad Rafi | Hasrat Jaipuri |
| 1970 | Mujrim | Ae Meri Jaan E Chaman Dilruba | Sonik-Omi | Mohammad Rafi | Hasrat Jaipuri |
| 1970 | Zirat Gahe Hind | Ae Aasman Wale Is Waqt Tu Kahan Hai | Mustafa Yusuf | Mohammad Rafi | Abdur Rab Chaush |
| 1970 | Himmat | Agar Tu Ladki Hoti Oye | Laxmikant-Pyarelal | Mohammad Rafi | Unknown |
| 1970 | Gunah Aur Kanoon | Aisa To Kabhi Mumkin Hi Nahi | Sapan-Jagmohan | Mohammad Rafi | Anwar Saharami |
| 1970 | Mehman | Are Ja Ja, Mujhe Na Pakad | Ravi | Mohammad Rafi, Asha Bhosle | Sahir Ludhianvi |
| 1970 | Pavitra Papi | Allah Hi Allah Kar Pyaare Bhai | Prem Dhawan | Mohammad Rafi | Prem Dhawan |
| 1970 | Begunah | Aakul Mehbubil | Usha Khanna | Mohammad Rafi, Asha Bhosle | Asad Bhopali |
| 1970 | Naya Raasta | Apne Andar Zara Jhaank Mere Watan | N. Dutta aka Datta Naik | Mohammad Rafi | Sahir Ludhianvi |
| 1970 | Maa Aur Mamta | Apne Nainon Ko Samajha Le Yeh Baat | Laxmikant-Pyarelal | Mohammad Rafi, Lata Mangeshkar | Anand Bakshi |
| 1970 | Ek Nanhi Munni Ladki Thi | Apne Rukhsar Zara Mere Labon Par | Ganesh | Mohammad Rafi | Asad Bhopali |
| 1972 | Pyar Hi Pyar | Abhi Salamat, Abhi Hai Zinda Aapka | Shankar-Jaikishan | Mohammad Rafi | Hasrat Jaipuri |
| 1974 | Benaam | Aa Raat Jati Hain Chupke Se | Rahul Dev Burman | Mohammad Rafi, Asha Bhosle | Majrooh Sultanpuri |
| 1975 | Playboy | Aaj Tumharein Kore Badan Pe | Sonik-Omi | Mohammad Rafi, Bindu | Asad Bhopali |
| 1976 | Fakira | Aadhi Sachchi Aadhi Jhoothi Teri Pr | Ravindra Jain | Mohammad Rafi, Lata Mangeshkar | Rajkavi Inderjeet Singh Tulsi |
| 1976 | Sikka | Aa Gayi Ab To Samajh Mein Haqeeqat | Chitragupt | Mohammad Rafi, Asha Bhosle | Kafil Azar |
| 1979 | Suhaag | Atthara Baras Ki Tu Ho Ne Ko Aayee | Laxmikant-Pyarelal | Mohammad Rafi, Lata Mangeshkar | Anand Bakshi |

- 1980s

| Year | Film | Song | Composer | Singer | Writer |
|---|---|---|---|---|---|
| 1980 | Phir Wahi Raat | Aa Gaye Yaaron Jeene Ke Din | Rahul Dev Burman | Mohammad Rafi | Majrooh Sultanpuri |
| 1980 | Walayati Babu | Aaja Aaja Balle Ni Meri MungFaliye | S. Madan | Mohammad Rafi, Dilraj Kaur | Punjabi Duet |
| 1980 | Hum Paanch | Aapno Se Munh Mod Ke | Laxmikant-Pyarelal | Mohammad Rafi | Anand Bakshi |
| 1980 | Aasha II | Aashaon Ke Saawan Mein | Laxmikant-Pyarelal | Mohammad Rafi, Lata Mangeshkar | Anand Bakshi |
| 1980 | Shaan | Aat Jate Huye | R. D. Burman | Mohammad Rafi | Unknown |
| 1980 | Waqt Ki Deewar | Ae Yaar Teri Yaari | Laxmikant-Pyarelal | Mohammad Rafi, Kishore Kumar | Anjaan |
| 1980 | Saajan Ki Saheli | Aise Na The Hum, Jeisi Humari | Usha Khanna | Mohammad Rafi | Majrooh Sultanpuri |
| 1980 | Aap Ke Deewane | Apni Khushiyan Tujhko De Doon | Rajesh Roshan | Mohammad Rafi, Amit Kumar | Anand Bakshi |
| 1980 | Judaai | Apno Ko Jo Thukrayega | Laxmikant-Pyarelal | Mohammad Rafi | Anand Bakshi |
| 1980 | Hum Paanch | Are Kya Kahiye Insaan Se | Laxmikant-Pyarelal | Mohammad Rafi | Unknown |
| 1980 | Biwi O Biwi | Are Paise Ka Khel Nirala Sone Ka Ha | R. D. Burman | Mohammad Rafi, Asha Bhosle | Unknown |
| 1981 | Poonam | Aa Zara Mere Hum-Nasheen | Anu Malik | Mohammad Rafi | Hasrat Jaipuri |
| 1981 | Khuda Kasam | Are Re Re Sambhalo Mujhe | Laxmikant-Pyarelal | Mohammad Rafi | Majrooh Sultanpuri |
| 1981 | Aajo Madhuro Banshori Baaje | Adho Adho Bol | Unknown | Mohammad Rafi | Kazi Nazrul Islam |
| 1981 | Ladies Tailor | Ab Ye Jane Ki Ice Kahte Hain | Laxmikant-Pyarelal | Mohammad Rafi | Majrooh Sultanpuri |
| 1981 | Shakko | Aga Bai Maike Tu Jeu Nako | Rajesh Roshan | Mohammad Rafi | Verma Malik |
| 1981 | Maan Gaye Ustad | Allah Ka Naam Pak Hai | Sonik-Omi | Mohammad Rafi | Verma Malik |
| 1982 | Aatma Aur Param | Aaj Ki Raat Mujhe Neend Nahin | Prithviraj | Mohammad Rafi | Prem Warbartani |
| 1982 | Samraat | Ab Meri Bari Aayi Jigar Thaam Lo | Laxmikant-Pyarelal | Mohammad Rafi, Manna Dey, Lata Mangeshkar | Unknown |
| 1982 | Jogi | Ab Mujhe Chand Sitaron Ki | Ravi | Mohammad Rafi, Asha Bhosle | Shakeel Badayuni |
| 1982 | Bheegi Palkein | Aadmi Ki Zindagi Ka | Jugal Kishore Tilak Raj | Mohammad Rafi, Asha Bhosle | M. G. Hashmat |
| 1986 | Aakhri Sanghursh | Aachal Pe Tera Hi Naam Likha | Hemant Bhosle | Mohammad Rafi, Asha Bhosle | Anjaan |
| 1986 | Love and God | Allah Tere Saath Hain | Naushad Ali | Mohammad Rafi | Khumar Barabankvi |

== Hindi non-film songs ==
| Year | Film | Song | Composer(s) | Writer(s) | Co-singer(s) |
|---|---|---|---|---|---|
| 1957 | Vrindavan Ka Krishna Kanhaiya | "Vrindavan Ka Krishna Kanhaiya" | various | various | Lata Mangeshkar |
| 1959 | Family Planning Songs | "Laal Tikon" (version 1) | Prem Dhawan | Prem Dhawan | Asha Bhosle |
| 1959 | Family Planning Songs | "Laal Tikon" (version 2) | Prem Dhawan | Prem Dhawan | Asha Bhosle |
| 197? | Single | "Sapna Har Ek Din Toote" | Madan Mohan | N/A | solo |
| 1991 | Ramzan Ki Azmat | "Ramzan Ki Azmat" | | | solo |
| 1991 | Ramzan Ki Azmat | "Fazilat-e-Ramzan" | | | solo |
| 2019 | Madhosh Teri Aankhen | "Likhe Jo Khat" | | | solo |

== Telugu songs ==
| Year | Film | Song | Composer(s) | Writer(s) | Co-singer(s) |
|---|---|---|---|---|---|
| 1964 | Ramadasu | "Kahekarona" | Aswadhamma | | |
| 1964 | Ramadasu | "Ram Naam Se Jyaada" | Aswadhamma | | |
| 1969 | Bhale Thammudu | "Enthavaru Gaani" | T. V. Raju | C. Narayana Reddy | |
| 1969 | Bhale Thammudu | "Gopala Bala Ninne Kori" | T. V. Raju | C. Narayana Reddy | P. Susheela |
| 1969 | Bhale Thammudu | "Iddari Manasulu" | T. V. Raju | C. Narayana Reddy | P. Susheela |
| 1969 | Bhale Thammudu | "Gumma Gumma" | T. V. Raju | C. Narayana Reddy | P. Susheela |
| 1969 | Bhale Thammudu | "Nede Ee Nade" | T. V. Raju | C. Narayana Reddy | P. Susheela |
| 1969 | Bhale Thammudu | "Qawali" | T. V. Raju | C. Narayana Reddy | P. Susheela |
| 1970 | Thalla? Pellama? | "Nuvvu Navvu Thunnavu" | T. V. Raju | C. Narayana Reddy | S. Janaki |
| 1976 | Aaradhana | "Ninnu Pilachindi" | Saluri Hanumantha Rao | C. Narayana Reddy | S. Janaki |
| 1976 | Aaradhana | "Nede Thelisindhi" | Saluri Hanumantha Rao | C. Narayana Reddy | S. Janaki |
| 1976 | Aaradhana | "Laila Majunu" | Saluri Hanumantha Rao | C. Narayana Reddy | S. Janaki |
| 1976 | Aaradhana | "O Priyathama" | Saluri Hanumantha Rao | C. Narayana Reddy | |
| 1976 | Aaradhana | "Neekela Intha Niraasa" | Saluri Hanumantha Rao | Dasharadi | |
| 1979 | Akbar Salim Anarkali | "Sipaayee O Sipaayee" | C. Ramchandra | C. Narayana Reddy | P. Susheela |
| 1979 | Akbar Salim Anarkali | "Kalusukunnaa Gubulaaye" | C. Ramchandra | C. Narayana Reddy | P. Susheela |
| 1979 | Akbar Salim Anarkali | "Reyi Aagiponi" | C. Ramchandra | C. Narayana Reddy | P. Susheela |
| 1979 | Akbar Salim Anarkali | "Thaane Maeli Musugu" | C. Ramchandra | C. Narayana Reddy | P. Susheela |
| 1979 | Akbar Salim Anarkali | "Thaaralenthagaa" | C. Ramchandra | C. Narayana Reddy | |

== Kannada songs ==
| Year | Film | Song | Composer(s) | Writer(s) | Co-singer(s) |
|---|---|---|---|---|---|
| 1967 | Onde Balliya Hoogalu | "Neenelli naḍèvè doora(ನೀನೆಲ್ಲಿ ನಡೆವೆ ದೂರ)" | Satyam | Geethapriya | |

== Malayalam songs ==
| Year | Film | Song | Composer(s) | Writer(s) | Co-singer(s) |
|---|---|---|---|---|---|
| 1980 | Thaliritta Kinakkal | "Shabaab Leke" | Jithin Shyam | Aayish Kamal | |

== Punjabi songs ==
Punjabi Film Songs
| Year | Song title | Movie |
|---|---|---|
| 1941 | Sohniye Heeriye Ni Teri Yad Ne | Gul Baloch |
| 1949 | Jag Wala Mela | Lachhi |
| 1956 | Main Koi Jhoot Boleya | Jagte Raho |
| 1956 | Dhol Vajda Tali Vajdi | Santo Banto |
| 1956 | Aaja Sonie | Santo Banto |
| 1959 | Rab Na Kare | Bhangra |
| 1959 | Jat Kurrian Ton Darda Mara | Bhangra |
| 1959 | Chitte Dand Hasno Nahin Rahende | Bhangra |
| 1960 | Main Yamla Jatt | Yamla Jatt |
| 1960 | Aakh Ladi Ve Ladi | Yamla Jatt |
| 1960 | Rang Mastana | Yamla Jatt |
| 1961 | Pyar De Pulekhe | Guddi |
| 1961 | Dana Pani Khich Ke Ley | Guddi |
| 1961 | Pyar De Bhuleke | Guddi |
| 1962 | Chunni Apni Nu | Pardesi Dhola |
| 1964 | Gora Rang Na | Lajo |
| 1969 | Mitter Pyare Noon | Nanak Naam Jahaz Hai |
| 1970 | Nanak Dukhia Sab Sansaar | Kaun Bhale Kaun Mande |
| 1971 | Rabba Ve Teriyan Be Par Vaahian | Kankan De Ohle |
| 1971 | Hambe Diye Dale Ni | Kankan De Ohle |
| 1971 | Hai Ne Main Sadke | Kankan De Ohle |
| 1971 | Kankan De Ohle | Kankan De Ohle |
| 1973 | Jis Ke Sir Upar Tu Swami | Man Jeete Jag Jeet |
| 1975 | Ene Zor Di Marori Meri Baan | Teri Meri Ikk Jindri |
| 1976 | Rus Ke Tun | Pappi Tare Anek |
| 1976 | Sohneyo Makhno | Daaj |
| 1976 | Daaj | Daaj |
| 1977 | Laggi Wale Te | Sassi Punnu |
| 1977 | Das Meriya Dilwarave | Sassi Punnu |
| 1978 | Lakk Hille Majajan Jandi Da | Sukhi Perwaar |
| 1978 | Tenu Baba Kehnda | Tera Jawab Nahin |
| 1978 | Aata Gun Ke Pakade Phulke | Laadlee |
| 1978 | Husan Gazab Da Vakhia | Gorakh Dhanda |
| 1979 | Ther Jaa Ve Truck De Drivera | Ranjha Ikk Tey Heeran Do |
| 1979 | Has Baliye | Kara Ki Shift Tere Ang Ang Di |
| 1979 | Aini Gal to Gulabi Galan | Sehti Murad |
| 1981 | Aaja Ni Baliye | Walayati Babu |
| 1982 | Teri Gut Da Paranda | Channi |

=== Non-film songs ===
| Year | Album | Song title | Music director | Co-singers |
|---|---|---|---|---|
| 2020 | Punjabi Film Hits (CD 2) | "Teri Azadi Di Shamma" | Sapan-Jagmohan | solo |
| 2020 | Punjabi Film Hits (CD 2) | "Tera Jism Desh Da" | Sapan-Jagmohan | solo |

== Marathi songs ==
=== Non-film songs ===
| Year | Album | Song | Composer(s) | Writer(s) |
|---|---|---|---|---|
| 1975 | Shoora Mi Vandile | "Are He Dukhi Jeeva, Bekarar Hou Nako" | Shrikant Thackeray | |
| | Ajaramar Bhakti Geete | Prabhu Tu Dayalu | | |
| | | He Mana Aaj Koni | | |
| | | Hasa Mulanno Hasa | | |
| 2017 | Mazi Marathi Gaani | Ha Rusva sod sakhe pura ha bahana | | |
| 2012 | | Ha Chhand Jivala Lavi Pise | | |
| | | Aga pori sambhal daryala ayalaya toofan bhari | | |
| | | Majhya viran hridayi | | |
| | | Virale geet kase | | |
| | | Nako arti ki nako pushpamala | | |
| | | Nako bhavya wada | | |
| | | Shodhisi Manava Rauli Mandiri | | |
| | | Khel tujha nyara | | |

== Odia songs ==
| Year | Film | Song | Composer(s) | Writer(s) |
|---|---|---|---|---|
| 1967 | Arundhati | "Mayuri Go Tuma Aakashe Mun" | Shantanu Mahapatra | Jibanananda Pani |
| 1967 | Arundhati | "Tumaku Parunita Bhuli" | Shantanu Mahapatra | Jibanananda Pani |

== Bengali songs ==
| Year | Film | Song | Composer(s) | Writer(s) | Co-singer(s) |
|---|---|---|---|---|---|
| 1958 | Indrani | "Sabhi Kuchh Lutkar" | Nachiketa Ghosh | Gauriprasanna Mazumdar | solo |
| 1976 | Ajasra Dhanyabad | "Nawal Kishore Shyamsundor" | Shyamal Mitra | Gauriprasanna Mazumdar | Asha Bhosle, Shailendra Singh, Shyamal Mitra |
| 1979 | Prahari | "Ore Man Ke Amon" | | | Amit Kumar, Bhupinder Singh, Aarti Mukherjee |

=== Non-film songs ===
| Song | Year | Album | Composer(s) | Lyricist(s) | Note |
|---|---|---|---|---|---|
| "Aajo Modhuro Banshori Baaje" | 1980 | Aajo Modhuro Banshori Baaje | Kazi Nazrul Islam | | |
| "Pashaner Bhangaley Ghoom" | 1980 | Aajo Modhuro Banshori Baaje | Kazi Nazrul Islam | | |
| "Uchatano Mon Gharey Rio Na" | 1980 | Aajo Modhuro Banshori Baaje | Kazi Nazrul Islam | | |
| "Tomar Haather Sonar Rakhee" | 1980 | Aajo Modhuro Banshori Baaje | Kazi Nazrul Islam | | |
| "Cheyona Sunoyona" | 1980 | Aajo Modhuro Banshori Baaje | Kazi Nazrul Islam | | |
| "Alga Koro Go Khompar Badhon" | 1980 | Aajo Modhuro Banshori Baaje | Kazi Nazrul Islam | | |
| "Adho Adho Bol" | 1980 | Aajo Modhuro Banshori Baaje | Kazi Nazrul Islam | | |
| "Brajogopi Khele Hori" | 1980 | Aajo Modhuro Banshori Baaje | Kazi Nazrul Islam | | |
| "Tomader Ashirbader" | 1982 | Roj Roj Kata Aar Phool Jogabo | | | |
| "Tar Chokhe Neme Aasa" | 1982 | Roj Roj Kata Aar Phool Jogabo | | | |
| "Gulmohorer Phul Jhore Jay" | 1982 | Roj Roj Kata Aar Phool Jogabo | | | |
| "Kono Chalbajer Mukhe" | 1982 | Roj Roj Kata Aar Phool Jogabo | | | |

== Gujarati songs ==
| Year | Film | Song | Composer(s) | Writer(s) | Co-singer(s) |
|---|---|---|---|---|---|
| 1968 | Liludi Dharati (film) | Adhvach Phatyo Dungaro | | | |

== Bhojpuri songs ==
| Year | Film | Song | Composer(s) | Writer(s) | Co-singer(s) |
|---|---|---|---|---|---|
| 1963 | Ganga Maiyya Tohe Piyari Chadhaibo | "Sonwa Ke Pinjra Mein" | Chitragupta | Shailendra | solo |
| 1965 | Saiyan Se Bhaile Milanwa | "Dhire Dhire Bole" | Robin Chatterjee | P. L. Santoshi | Sandhya Mukherjee |
| 1968 | Vidhana Naach Nachawe | Gori Tore Naina Chain Churaile | Dattaram Wadkar | Shailendra | |
| 1968 | Vidhana Naach Nachawe | Dhire Dhire Nayanva | Dattaram Wadkar | Shailendra | Suman Kalyanpur |
| 1968 | Vidhana Naach Nachawe | More Urje Re Nayanva | Dattaram Wadkar | Shailendra | Suman Kalyanpur |
| 1977 | Dangal | "Phoot Gaile Kismatiya" | Nadeem–Shravan | Rajpati Rahi | Solo |

== See also ==
- Mohammed Rafi
