= Shailendra (lyricist) =

Indian Hindi-Urdu poet, lyricist and film producer (1923–1966)

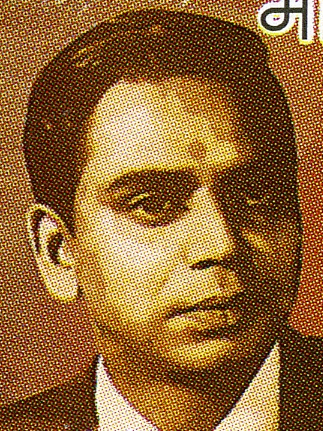
- Born: Shankardas Kesarilal; 30 August 1923; Rawalpindi, Punjab, British India (now Punjab, Pakistan)
- Died: 14 December 1966 (aged 43); Mumbai, India
- Occupations: Lyricist; poet; film producer
- Years active: 1949–1966
- Spouse: Shakuntala (m. 1948)
- Children: 5

Shailendra (born Shankardas Kesarilal; 30 August 1923 – 14 December 1966) was an Indian Hindi-Urdu poet, lyricist and film producer.

He is regarded as one of the greatest and most celebrated lyricists of the Indian film industry. Known for his association with filmmaker Raj Kapoor, singer Mukesh, and composer duo Shankar–Jaikishan, he wrote lyrics for several successful Hindi film songs in the 1950s and 1960s. He also wrote songs in the Bhojpuri language for early Bhojpuri movies as his mother tongue was Bhojpuri.

== Early life ==
Shankar Shailendra was born on 30 August 1923 in Rawalpindi, Punjab (now in Pakistan). He was born into a Dalit family belonging to the Chamar community and his ancestors were originally from the Ara district of Bihar. Due to financial crisis, his family later moved to Mathura from Rawalpindi where Shailendra completed his studies. At a young age, he lost his mother and sister. His village in Arrah, Bihar mostly comprised agricultural laborers and Shailendra’s father had shifted to Rawalpindi to find work at a military hospital. Shailendra came in contact with Indra Bahadur Khare at the Kishori Raman Vidyalay (now Kishori Raman Inter College) Mathura. Both composed poems, sitting on the rock located on the bank of a pond in between railway 27 quarters and railway line near to Mathura station. Afterwards Shailendra moved to Bombay, towards the end of 1947, for films and Indra Bahadur Khare became famous in Raashtreey Kavita.

== Career in films ==
Shailendra started his career as an apprentice with Indian Railways in Matunga workshop, Mumbai in 1947. He began to write poetry at this time.

The filmmaker Raj Kapoor noticed Shailendra, when the latter read his poem Jalta hai Punjab at a mushaira (poetic symposium). Kapoor offered to buy the poem Jalta Hai Punjab written by Shailendra and for his movie Aag (1948). Shailendra, a member of the leftist Indian People's Theatre Association (IPTA), was wary of mainstream Indian cinema and refused. However, after his wife became pregnant, Shailendra himself approached Raj Kapoor in need of money. At this time, Raj Kapoor was filming Barsaat (1949), and two of the film songs had not yet been written. For ₹ 500, Shailendra wrote these two songs: Patli kamar hai and Barsaat mein. The music for Barsaat was composed by Shankar–Jaikishan.

The team of Raj Kapoor, Shailendra, and Shankar–Jaikishan went on to produce many other hit songs. The song 'Awara Hoon' from the 1951 film Awaara, written by Shailendra, became the most appreciated Indian film song outside India at the time. Shailendra wrote lyrics for the songs of most of Raj Kapoor’s films, Shree 420 released in 1955 is one of them. All songs of this film were hits and they are still sung on various occasions. One can easily understand the power and magic of Shailendra's lyrics from the song "Pyaar hua iqaraar hua hai, Pyaar se phir kyo darta hai dil", remains an evergreen Bollywood song.

In the days when composers would recommend lyricists to producers, Shankar–Jaikishan once promised Shailendra that they would recommend him, but did not keep their promise. Shailendra sent them a note with the lines, Chhoti Si Yeh Duniya, Pehchaane Raaste Hain. Kahin To Miloge, toh Poochhenge Haal ("The world is small, the roads are familiar. We'll meet sometime, and ask 'How do you do?'"). Shankar–Jaikishan realised what the message meant and, having apologised, turned the lines into a popular song. The song, sung by Kishore Kumar, appeared in the film Rangoli (1962), for which the producer Rajendra Singh Bedi wanted to sign Majrooh Sultanpuri as the lyricist. However, Shankar–Jaikishan insisted on Shailendra and the producer had to oblige.

Shailendra also wrote lyrics for several Bhojpuri films. Avijit Ghosh mentions in his book, Cinema Bhojpuri, that Shailendra penned songs for Ganga Maiya Tohe Piyari Chadhaibo (the first Bhojpuri film), Ganga, Mitwa and Vidhana Naach Nachawe. On page 184, Ghosh wrote that Shailendra received the best lyricist award for Ganga Maiyya... for all Bhojpuri and Magadhi films released till then at a function held in April 1965 in Calcutta. Shailendra also appeared on-screen as the male character singing the songs, "Chali Kaunse Desh Gujariya Tu Saj Dhaj Ke" from Boot Polish (1954) lip-syncing to Talat Mahmood's vocals as well as "Tedhi Tedhi Humse Phire Saari Duniya" from Musafir (1957) lip-syncing to Manna Dey's vocals. Both of these songs were written by him. He also played a cameo in Shree 420 (1955), playing the role of Raj's (Raj Kapoor's character) associate in the con to sell shares of his fictitious company, making phone calls to Raj while posing as a Japanese investor desperate to buy shares of his company.

== Personal life ==
During his struggling period, Shailendra came in contact with a distant relative who previously worked as a station master at the railway station of Jhansi, Bundelkhand. Through him, Shailendra met his daughter Shakuntala (2 August 1932 – 5 March 1991). Shailendra married Shakuntala in 1948, in a love marriage. They had three sons and two daughters:

- Shailey Shailendra (born Hemant Shailendra; 9 December 1949 – 7 February 2007), a lyricist
- Manoj Shailendra (born early 1950s)
- Amla Shailendra Mazumdar (born 15 October early 1950s) writer, author of Shailendra – A Love Lyric in Print : A Daughter Remembers (published 4 August 2024)
- Gopa Shailendra Chandra (27 June 1954 – 22 January 2015)
- Dinesh Shailendra (born 9 April 1956), film director and writer

== Last years ==
The only film Shailendra produced is Teesri Kasam (1966). Directed by Basu Bhattacharya and starring Raj Kapoor and Waheeda Rehman, it was an adaptation of Phanishwar Nath Renu's famous short story Maare Gaye Ghulfam. The film won the National Film Award for Best Feature Film, but was a commercial failure. Declining health resulting from tension associated with film production and anxiety due to financial loss, coupled with alcohol abuse, effected his early death on 14 December 1966 at the age of 43. After his death, his associates Raj Kapoor and Mukesh, both of whom were involved in the film, helped Shailendra's family to overcome from the financial problems and due payments to the creditors.

Contrary to this, Dinesh Shailendra, the youngest son of the legendary lyricist, has openly clarified in interviews (such as his detailed chat with The Hindu) that the popular industry myth surrounding his father’s passing is highly exaggerated. As one of the most successful lyricists of Hindi cinema's Golden Era, Shailendra was earning an exceptional income through constant film projects and music royalties. A single movie's distribution failure could not completely bankrupt him. According to Dinesh, it was not the lack of money that broke Shailendra, but the emotional trauma and betrayal by close associates in the industry. The delay in releasing Teesri Kasam was caused by distributors backing out and people he trusted turning their backs on him. This deep sense of betrayal—rather than poverty—shattered his mental and physical well-being.

Shailendra's song "Rula Ke Gaya Sapna Mera" Jewel Thief (1967) directly reflected his real-life feelings of betrayal during his final days.

== Legacy ==
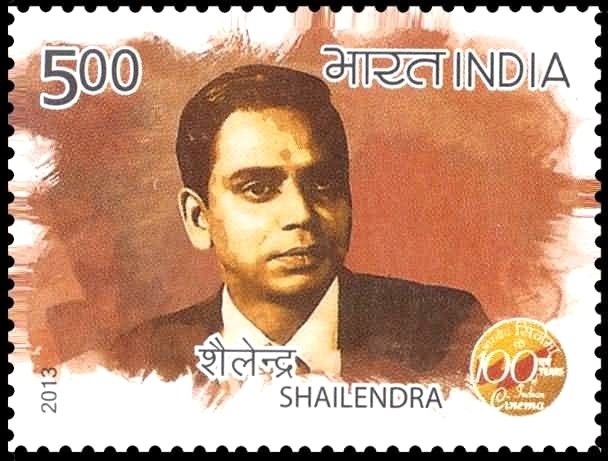
Shailendra on a 2013 stamp of India

Shailendra's son Shaily Shailendra also became a lyricist. At the age of 17, Raj Kapoor asked him to complete his father's song Jeena yahan, marna yahan for the film Mera Naam Joker. Shaily Shailendra completed the "mukhra" (lit. "face," or chorus) of the song whereas Shailendra completed the "antara" (verses) only before his demise. Lyricist, writer, and director Gulzar has repeatedly stated that Shailendra was the best lyricist produced by the Hindi film industry.

Shailendra's song Mera Joota Hai Japani was featured in the 2016 Hollywood movie Deadpool (2016). A street in the Dhauli Pyau locality of Mathura was named after Shailendra on 9 March 2016 - Geetkar-Jankavi Shailendra Marg – Mathura. Shailendra spent 16 years of his early life in Mathura before moving to Mumbai to work for Indian Railways in 1947.

== Awards ==
=== Lyricist ===
Shailendra won the Filmfare Best Lyricist Award thrice.

- 1958: "Yeh Mera Deewanapan Hai" (Yahudi)
- 1959: "Sab Kuch Seekha Humne" (Anari)
- 1968: "Main Gaoon Tum So Jao" (Brahmchari)

=== Producer ===
As a producer Shailendra's film Teesri Kasam (1966) won the National Film award of 1967 in the category Best feature film.

== Filmography ==
Year	Film	Songs written	Music Director	Notes
1949	Barsaat'	2	Shankar-Jaikishan	Debut film
1951	Awāra	7	Shankar-Jaikishan	
1951	Badal	5	Shankar-Jaikishan	
1951	Buzdil	3-4	Sachin Dev Burman	
1951	Kali Ghata	1	Shankar-Jaikishan	
1951	Nagina	5	Shankar-Jaikishan	
1952	Anand Math	4	Hemant Kumar	
1952	Anhonee	1	Roshan Lal Nagrath	
1952	Badnam	5	Basant Prakash	
1952	Chhatrapati Shivaji	8 (All)	Ramchandra Narhar Chitalkar	
1952	Daag	6	Shankar-Jaikishan	
1952	Nau Bahar	4	Roshan Lal Nagrath	One of Shailendra's songs "Phool Chun Le Mere Baalam..." sung by Lata Mangeshkar was not used in the film although it was issued in the film's records. This song was later used in the film Firdaus (1953) and was re-issued under that film's records.
1952	Parbat	3	Shankar-Jaikishan	
1952	Poonam	4	Shankar-Jaikishan	
1952	Sanskar	7 (All)	Roshan Lal Nagrath	
1952	Shrimatiji	1	Jimmy	While the film had 3 music directors Basant Prakash, Jimmy and Mohinder Singh Sarna, Shailendra penned only 1 song in the film "Teri Chahat Mein Balam Mit Gaye Hum Teri Kasam..." sung by Geeta Dutt.
1953	Aagosh	4	Roshan Lal Nagrath	
1953	Aah	4	Shankar-Jaikishan	
1953	Aas	5	Shankar-Jaikishan	
1953	Anarkali	2	Ramchandra Narhar Chitalkar	
1953	Aurat	3	Shankar-Jaikishan	
1953	Do Bigha Zamin	4 (All)	Salil Chowdhury	
1953	Firdaus	1	Roshan Lal Nagrath	The song "Phool Chun Le Mere Balaam..." was originally recorded for the film Nau Bahar (1952), made by the same film producer, M. S. Ahluwalia, but had remained unused. It was later included in this film and reissued on records for it. This was the only song of both Shailendra and Roshan individually in the film. The other songs of this film was composed by Robin Chatterjee.
1953	Mashuqa	6	Roshan Lal Nagrath	
1953	Naya Ghar	4	Shankar-Jaikishan	
1953	Patita	6	Shankar-Jaikishan	
1953	Shikast	8	Shankar-Jaikishan	
1954	Badshah	2	Shankar-Jaikishan	
1954	Bhai Saheb	10 (All)	Neenu Majumdar	
1954	Boot Polish	4	Shankar-Jaikishan	Also co-performed in the song "Chali Kaun Se Des Gujariya Tu Saj Dhaj Ke..." written by himself, lip-syncing to co-singer Talat Mahmood's vocals.
1954	Chandni Chowk	4	Roshan Lal Nagrath	
1954	Mayurpankh	3	Shankar-Jaikishan	
1954	Naukri	6 (All)	Salil Chowdhury	
1954	Pilpli Saheb	2	Sardul Singh Kwatra	
1954	Pooja	7	Shankar-Jaikishan	
1955	Amanat	6 (All)	Salil Chowdhury	
1955	Chingari	6	Manohar Lal Sonik	
1955	Madh Bhare Nain	8 (All)	Sachin Dev Burman	
1955	Munimji	4	Sachin Dev Burman	
1955	Seema	4	Shankar-Jaikishan	
1955	Shree 420	6	Shankar-Jaikishan	Also performed the role of Raj's (Raj Kapoor) associate in the con to sell shares of his fictitious company, making phone calls to Raj while posing as a Japanese investor desperate to buy shares of his company.
1955	Tis Maar Khan	At least 1	Sardul Singh Kwatra	
1956	Aawaz	3	Salil Chowdhury	
1956	Basant Bahar	8	Shankar-Jaikishan	
1956	Chori Chori	4	Shankar-Jaikishan	
1956	Delhi Darbar	1	Shri Nath Tripathi	
1956	Ek Din Ratre	1	Salil Chowdhury	Bengali version of the Hindi film Jagte Raho (1956). One of Shailendra's Hindi songs from Jagte Raho, "Maine Jo Li Angdaayi, Dheere Se Muskaayi..." was retained in this film too.
1956	Halaku	5	Shankar-Jaikishan	
1956	Jagte Raho	4	Salil Chowdhury	
1956	Kismet Ka Khel	5	Shankar-Jaikishan	
1956	New Delhi	7	Shankar-Jaikishan	
1956	Parivar	6 (All)	Salil Chowdhury	
1956	Patrani	9	Shankar-Jaikishan	
1956	Raj Hath	7	Shankar-Jaikishan	
1956	Sailaab	2	Mukul Roy	
1957	Ab Dilli Dur Nahin	4	Dattaram Wadkar	
1957	Begunah	3	Shankar-Jaikishan	
1957	Coffee House	1	Roshan Lal Nagrath	
1957	Ek Gaon Ki Kahani	7 (All)	Salil Chowdhury	
1957	Kathputli	6	Shankar-Jaikishan	
1957	Musafir	6 (All)	Salil Chowdhury	Also co-performed in the song "Tedhi Tedhi Humse Phire Saari Duniya..." written by himself, lip-syncing to co-singer Manna Dey's vocals.
1957	Ram Hanuman Yuddha	5	Shri Nath Tripathi	
1958	Aji Bas Shukriya	1	Roshan Lal Nagrath	
1958	Baghi Sipahi	5	Shankar-Jaikishan	
1958	Detective	8 (All)	Mukul Roy	
1958	Devar Bhaabi	5	Ravi Shankar Sharma	
1958	Dilli Ka Thug	2	Ravi Shankar Sharma	
1958	Indrani	1	Nachiketa Ghosh	He wrote the Hindi song "Sabhi Kuch Lutakar Huye Hum Tumhare..." in this Bengali film.
1958	Madhumati	10	Salil Chowdhury	
1958	Naya Kadam	1	Shivram Krishna	
1958	Savera	5	Shailesh Mukherjee	
1958	Yahudi	6	Shankar-Jaikishan	
1959	Anari	5	Shankar-Jaikishan	
1959	Chand	5	Hemant Kumar	
1959	Chhoti Bahen	6	Shankar-Jaikishan	
1959	Deep Jalta Rahe	5	Roshan Lal Nagrath	
1959	Heera Moti	4	Roshan Lal Nagrath	
1959	Hum Bhi Insan Hain	6 (All)	Hemant Kumar	
1959	Insan Jaag Utha	7 (All)	Sachin Dev Burman	
1959	Jawani Ki Hawa	2	Ravi Shankar Sharma	
1959	Kaagaz Ke Phool	1	Sachin Dev Burman	"Hum Tum Jise Kehta Hai Shaadi..." was the only song Shailendra penned for this film. While he was credited in the film's music records, his name was missing in the opening credits as it featured only Kaifi Azmi's name who penned all the film's other songs.
1959	Kal Hamara Hai	3	Gajanan and Chitragupta Srivastava	The film had 2 music directors who composed songs separately - Chitragupta Srivastava and Gajanan. However, Gajanan was not credited in the film's opening credits nor in its publicity material. The identity of this music director is not confirmed but it is possible that he was Gajanan Karnad, a violinist, sessions musician and a classical musician. Shailendra penned 1 song for Chitragupta and both the 2 songs which Gajanan composed for this film.
1959	Kanhaiya	6	Shankar-Jaikishan	
1959	Love Marriage	5	Shankar-Jaikishan	
1959	Madhu	4	Roshan Lal Nagrath	
1959	Main Nashe Men Hoon	4	Shankar-Jaikishan	
1959	Nai Raahen	3	Ravi Shankar Sharma	
1959	Satta Bazaar	1	Kalyanji-Anandji	
1959	Shararat	5	Shankar-Jaikishan	
1959	Ujala	5	Shankar-Jaikishan	
1960	Anuradha	7 (All)	Pandit Ravi Shankar	
1960	Dil Apna Aur Preet Parai	5	Shankar-Jaikishan	
1960	Ek Phool Char Kante	6	Shankar-Jaikishan	
1960	Honeymoon	7 (All)	Salil Chowdhury	
1960	Jis Desh Mein Ganga Behti Hai	10	Shankar-Jaikishan	
1960	Kala Bazar	8 (All)	Sachin Dev Burman	
1960	Masoom	1	Hemant Kumar	Hemant Kumar was initially signed up to compose the music for this film and had even composed the song "Nani Teri Morni Ko Mor Le Gaye..." sung by his daughter Ranu Mukherjee (her first Hindi film song) and penned by Shailendra. However, the recording of this song and the composition of the remaining songs in the film were handed over to Robin Banerjee when Hemant Kumar became unavailable due to an overseas trip. This also remained the only song of Shailendra for the film.
1960	Miya Bibi Razi	7 (All)	Sachin Dev Burman	
1960	Parakh	5 (All)	Salil Chowdhury	
1960	Singapore	4	Shankar-Jaikishan	
1960	Usne Kaha Tha	4	Salil Chowdhury	
1961	Aas Ka Panchhi	4	Shankar-Jaikishan	
1961	Boy Friend	2	Shankar-Jaikishan	
1961	Char Diwari	6 (All)	Salil Chowdhury	
1961	Chhote Nawab	8 (All)	Rahul Dev Burman	
1961	Jab Pyar Kisise Hota Hai	2	Shankar-Jaikishan	
1961	Junglee	3	Shankar-Jaikishan	
1961	Karodpati	6	Shankar-Jaikishan	
1961	Kanch Ki Gudiya	6 (All)	Suhrid Kar	
1961	Memdidi	6 (All)	Salil Chowdhury	
1961	Roop Ki Rani Choron Ka Raja	6	Shankar-Jaikishan	
1961	Sapan Suhane	7 (All)	Salil Chowdhury	
1961	Sasural	5	Shankar-Jaikishan	
1962	Aashiq	6	Shankar-Jaikishan	
1962	Asli Naqli	2	Shankar-Jaikishan	
1962	Bombay Ka Chor	1	Ravi Shankar Sharma	
1962	Dil Tera Diwana	4	Shankar-Jaikishan	
1962	Ganga Maiyya Tohe Piyari Chadhaibo	7 (All)	Chitragupta Srivastava	First film made under the Bhojpuri film industry
1962	Half Ticket	7 (All)	Salil Chowdhury	
1962	Hariyali Aur Rasta	6	Shankar-Jaikishan	
1962	Naughty Boy	8 (All)	Sachin Dev Burman	
1962	Professor	2	Shankar-Jaikishan	
1962	Rungoli	6	Shankar-Jaikishan	
1962	Sangeet Samrat Tansen	12	Tansen, Shri Nath Tripathi and Swami Haridas	
1962	Sautela Bhai	8 (All)	Anil Krishna Biswas	
1962	Shiv Parvati	1	Shri Nath Tripathi	
1962	Soorat Aur Seerat	4 (All)	Roshan Lal Nagrath	
1963	Bandini	6	Sachin Dev Burman	
1963	Begaana	8 (All)	Sapan-Jagmohan	
1963	Dil Ek Mandir	5	Shankar-Jaikishan	
1963	Ek Dil Sau Afsane	4	Shankar-Jaikishan	
1963	Hamrahi	3	Shankar-Jaikishan	
1963	Jab Se Tumhe Dekha Hai	5	Dattaram Wadkar	
1963	Meri Surat Teri Ankhen	7 (All)	Sachin Dev Burman	
1964	Apne Huye Paraye	5	Shankar-Jaikishan	
1964	April Fool	1	Shankar-Jaikishan	
1964	Ayee Milan Ki Bela	2	Shankar-Jaikishan	
1964	Beti Bete	4	Shankar-Jaikishan	
1964	Door Gagan Ki Chhaon Mein	7	Kishore Kumar	
1964	Rajkumar	4	Shankar-Jaikishan	
1964	Sangam	4	Shankar-Jaikishan	
1964	Sanjh Aur Savera	3	Shankar-Jaikishan	
1964	Zindagi	5	Shankar-Jaikishan	
1965	Chand Aur Suraj	6 (All)	Salil Chowdhury	
1965	Chhoti Chhoti Baten	6 (All)	Anil Krishna Biswas	
1965	Guide	9	Sachin Dev Burman	
1965	Gumnaam	3	Shankar-Jaikishan	
1965	Janwar	3	Shankar-Jaikishan	
1965	Poonam Ki Raat	6 (All)	Salil Chowdhury	
1966	Amrapali	4	Shankar-Jaikishan	
1966	Budtameez	2	Shankar-Jaikishan	
1966	Gaban	3	Shankar-Jaikishan	
1966	Kunwari	7	Shri Nath Tripathi	
1966	Love In Tokyo	1		
1966	Pinjre Ke Panchhi	4	Salil Chowdhury	
1966	Pyar Mohabbat	5	Shankar-Jaikishan	
1966	Suraj	2	Shankar-Jaikishan	
1966	Teesri Kasam	7	Shankar-Jaikishan	Also Producer
1967	Aman	1	Shankar-Jaikishan	Posthomous release
1967	An Evening In Paris	5	Shankar-Jaikishan	Posthomous release
1967	Around The World	5	Shankar-Jaikishan	Posthomous release
1967	Chhoti Si Mulaqat	3	Shankar-Jaikishan	Posthomous release
1967	Diwana	5	Shankar-Jaikishan	Posthomous release
1967	Gunahon Ka Devta	1	Shankar-Jaikishan	Posthomous release
1967	Hare Kanch Ki Chooriyan	3	Shankar-Jaikishan	Posthomous release
1967	Hum Do Daku	5 (All)	Kishore Kumar	Posthomous release
1967	Jewel Thief	1	Sachin Dev Burman	Posthomous release
1967	Laat Saheb	2	Shankar-Jaikishan	Posthomous release
1967	Raat Aur Din	5	Shankar-Jaikishan	Posthomous release
1968	Brahmachari	3	Shankar-Jaikishan	Posthomous release
1968	Jhuk Gaya Aasman	2	Shankar-Jaikishan	Posthomous release
1968	Kahin Aur Chal	3	Shankar-Jaikishan	Posthomous release
1968	Sapno Ka Saudagar	3	Shankar-Jaikishan	Posthomous release
1968	Vidhana Naach Nachawe	4 (All)	Dattaram Wadkar	Posthomous release; Bhojpuri film
1970	Mera Naam Joker	4	Shankar-Jaikishan	Posthomous release; Shailendra penned the hook lines of the song "Jeena Yahaan Marna Yahaan..." sung by Mukesh, the remaining lyrics were completed by his eldest son Shailey Shailendra, who also made his debut as a lyricist in this film.
1971	Door Ka Rahi	2	Kishore Kumar	Posthomous release
1971	Jawan Mohabbat	1	Shankar-Jaikishan	Posthomous release
1971	Jwala	2	Shankar-Jaikishan	Posthomous release
1983	Film Hi Film	1	Shankar-Jaikishan	Posthomous release; Footage of the song "Hans Kar Hansa Masti Mein Gaa..." written by him for the shelved film Bahrupiya (1964) sung by Manna Dey, performed by Raj Kapoor with music by Shankar-Jaikishan was used in this film.
1990	Mamta Ki Chhan Mein	1	Kishore Kumar	Posthomous release; The song "Mera Geet Adhoora Hai..." was Shailendra's last recorded Hindi film song. It was also the last time a Kishore Kumar song was picturised on Rajesh Khanna.
