= Filmfare Award for Best Male Playback Singer =

Annual award for Hindi films

Filmfare Award for Best Playback Singer Male
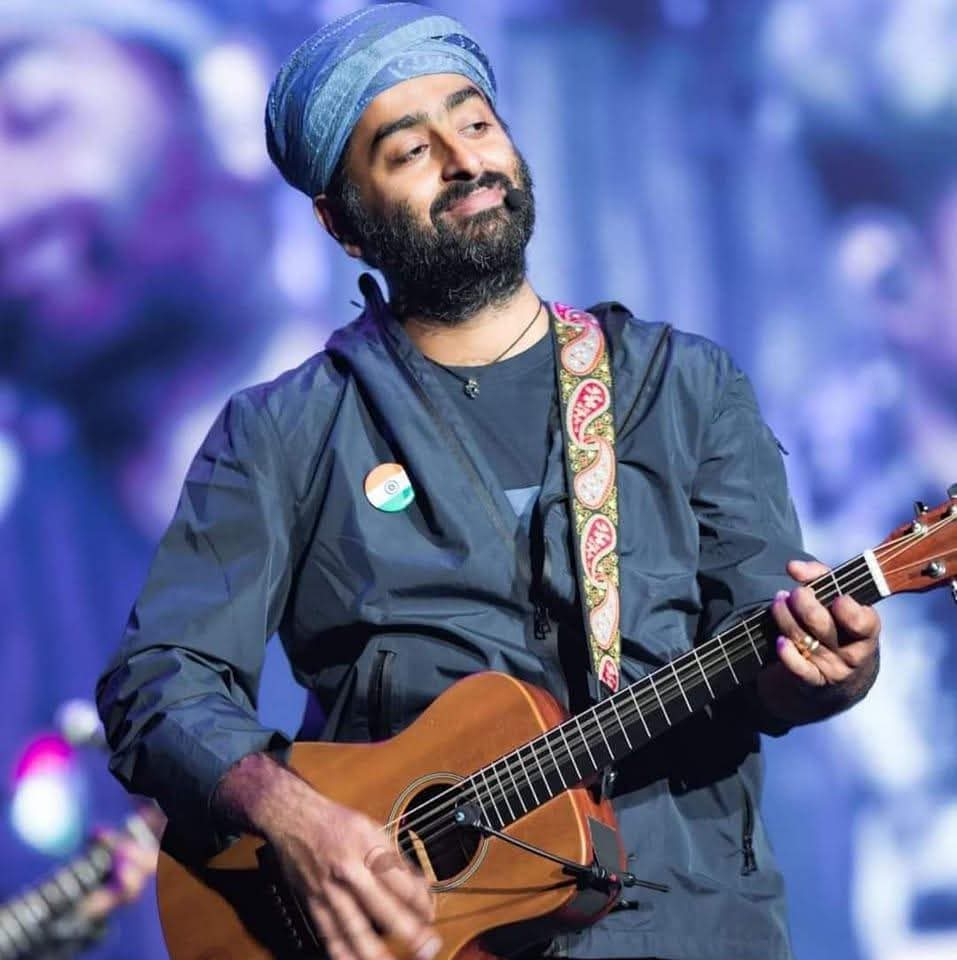
- The 2025 Recipient: Arijit Singh for " Sajni"
- Awarded for: Best Performance by a Playback Singer Male
- Country: India
- Presented by: Filmfare
- First award: Mukesh, "Sab Kuch Seekha Humne"; Anari (1960)
- Currently held by: Arijit Singh, "Sajni"; Laapataa Ladies (2025)
- Website: Filmfare Awards

The Filmfare Best Male Playback Singer Award is given by Indian film magazine Filmfare as a part of its annual Filmfare Awards for Hindi films, to recognise a male playback singer who has delivered an outstanding performance in a film song.

Although the Filmfare Awards started in 1954, awards for the best playback singer category started in 1959. From inception of the category through 1967, both the female and male singers used to compete for a single award, after which separate categories were created for female and male singers respectively.

== Superlatives ==
| Superlative | Artist | Record |
|---|---|---|
| Most awards | Kishore Kumar, Arijit Singh | 8 |
| Most nominations | Kishore Kumar | 28 |
| Most consecutive wins | Kumar Sanu, Arijit Singh | 5 |
| Most decades | Udit Narayan | 3 (1980s, 1990s, 2000s) |
| First Winner | Mukesh | 1960 |
| Most nominations without ever winning | KK, Suresh Wadkar | 6 |
| Most nominations in a single year | Kishore Kumar (1985) | 4 |
| Oldest winner | Kishore Kumar (1986) | 57 (age) |
| Oldest nominee | Kishore Kumar (1986) | 57 (age) |
| Youngest winner | Raghav Chaithanya | 21(age) |
| Youngest nominee | Master Vignesh (2005) | 11 (age) |

- Kishore Kumar and Arijit Singh hold the record for the most wins in this category, with eight, followed by Mohammed Rafi with six. Kumar Sanu and Udit Narayan have each won the award five times, while Mukesh has received it four times and Mahendra Kapoor three times.
- Mohammed Rafi dominated the 1960s with five wins. In the 1970s, Kishore Kumar and Mukesh each won the award three times. Kishore won the award five times in the 1980s. Kumar Sanu led the 1990s with five awards, including a record of five consecutive wins from 1991 to 1995. In the 2000s, Udit Narayan, Sonu Nigam, and Shaan each won the award twice. Arijit Singh dominated the 2010s with five wins during the decade.
- In terms of nominations, Kishore Kumar leads with 28, followed by Arijit Singh with 24, Mohammed Rafi with 21, Udit Narayan & Sonu Nigam with 20 each, both Mukesh and Kumar Sanu with 14 nominations each.
- Udit Narayan is the only singer to have received nominations and won the award in three different decades, and he is also the only Nepali-origin singer to have won in this category.
- Kumar Sanu (1991–1995) and Arijit Singh (2016–2020) share the record for the most consecutive wins, with five wins in a row. Kishore Kumar won the award four times consecutively from 1983 to 1986.
- Mukesh remains the only playback singer to have won this award posthumously, receiving it in 1977.
- In 2006, Himesh Reshammiya became the first music director to win the award for Best Male Playback Singer.
- Two singers have received all the nominations in the category in a single year:
  - In 1969, Mohammed Rafi was the sole nominee with three nominations.
  - In 1985, Kishore Kumar held all four nominations, all from the film Sharaabi.

=== Most wins ===
| Winner | Number of wins | Number of nominations | Years |
|---|---|---|---|
| Kishore Kumar | 8 | 28 | 1970, 1976, 1979, 1981, 1983, 1984, 1985, 1986 |
| Arijit Singh | 8 | 24 | 2014, 2016, 2017, 2018, 2019, 2020, 2023, 2025 |
| Mohammed Rafi | 6 | 21 | 1961, 1962, 1965, 1967, 1969, 1978 |
| Udit Narayan | 5 | 20 | 1989, 1996, 1997, 2000, 2002 |
| Kumar Sanu | 5 | 14 | 1991, 1992, 1993, 1994, 1995 |
| Mukesh | 4 | 14 | 1960, 1971, 1973, 1977 |

=== Most consecutive wins ===
| Artist | Number of Win | Year |
|---|---|---|
| Kumar Sanu | 5 | 1991–1995 |
| Arijit Singh | 5 | 2016–2020 |
| Kishore Kumar | 4 | 1983–1986 |

=== Multiple nominees ===
| Artist | Number of Nominations | Wins |
|---|---|---|
| Kishore Kumar | 28 | 8 |
| Arijit Singh | 24 | 8 |
| Mohammed Rafi | 21 | 6 |
| Udit Narayan | 20 | 5 |
| Sonu Nigam | 20 | 2 |
| Kumar Sanu | 14 | 5 |
| Mukesh | 14 | 4 |
| Sukhwinder Singh | 6 | 2 |
| KK | 6 | 0 |
| Suresh Wadkar | 6 | 0 |

== Winners and nominees ==
Table key
| ‡ | Indicates the winner |
| † | Indicates a posthumous winner |

=== 1950s ===
Note: The category for Best Playback Singer was established in 1959, and until 1967 both male and female singers used to compete for a single award.

| Year | Photos of winners | Singer | Song | Film | Ref. |
|---|---|---|---|---|---|
| 1959 (6th) | Award was Won by a Female Singer | | | | |

=== 1960s ===
| Year | Photos of winners | Singer | Song | Film | Ref. |
|---|---|---|---|---|---|
| 1960 (7th) | | Mukesh ‡ | "Sab Kuch Seekha Humne" | Anari | |
| 1960 (7th) | | Talat Mahmood | "Jalte Hain Jiske Liye" | Sujata | |
| 1961 (8th) | | Mohammed Rafi ‡ | "Chaudhvin Ka Chand" | Chaudhvin Ka Chand | |
| 1961 (8th) | | Other Nominees were Female Singers | | | |
| 1962 (9th) | | Mohammed Rafi ‡ | "Teri Pyari Pyari Surat Ko" | Sasural | |
| 1962 (9th) | | Mohammad Rafi | "Husn Wale Tera" | Gharana | |
| 1962 (9th) | | Mukesh | "Hothon Pe Sacchai" | Jis Desh Men Ganga Behti Hai | |
| 1963 (10th) | Award Won by a Female Singer | | | | |
| 1963 (10th) | | Mohammed Rafi | "Ae Gulbadan" | Professor | |
| 1964 (11th) | | Mahendra Kapoor ‡ | "Chalo Ek Bar Phir Se" | Gumrah | |
| 1964 (11th) | | Mohammed Rafi | "Mere Mehboob Tujhe" | Mere Mehboob | |
| 1965 (12th) | | Mohammed Rafi ‡ | "Chahunga Main Tujhe" | Dosti | |
| 1965 (12th) | | Mukesh | "Dost Dost Na Raha" | Sangam | |
| 1966 (13th) | Award Won by a Female Singer | | | | |
| 1966 (13th) | | Mohammed Rafi | "Chho Lene Do" | Kaajal | |
| 1967 (14th) | | Mohammed Rafi ‡ | "Baharon Phool Barsaao" | Suraj | |
| 1967 (14th) | | Other Nominees were Female Singers | | | |
| 1968 (15th) | | Mahendra Kapoor ‡ | "Neele Gagan Ke Tale" | Hamraaz | |
| 1968 (15th) | | Mahendra Kapoor | "Mere Desh Ki Dharti" | Upkar | |
| 1968 (15th) | | Mukesh | "Sawan Ka Mahina" | Milan | |
| 1969 (16th) | | Mohammed Rafi ‡ | "Dil Ke Jharokhe Mein" | Brahmachari | |
| 1969 (16th) | | Mohammed Rafi | "Babul Ki Duvayen" | Neel Kamal | |
| 1969 (16th) | | Mohammed Rafi | "Main Gaoon Tum So Jao" | Brahmachari | |

=== 1970s ===
| Year | Photos of winners | Singer | Song | Film | Ref. |
|---|---|---|---|---|---|
| 1970 (17th) | | Kishore Kumar ‡ | "Roop Tera Mastana" | Aradhana | |
| 1970 (17th) | | Manna Dey | "Kaal Ka Paiya" | Chanda Aur Bijli | |
| 1970 (17th) | | Mohammed Rafi | "Badi Mastani Hai" | Jeene Ki Raah | |
| 1971 (18th) | | Mukesh ‡ | "Sabse Bada Nadaan" | Pehchan | |
| 1971 (18th) | | Mohammed Rafi | "Khilona Jankar" | Khilona | |
| 1971 (18th) | | Mukesh | "Bas Yehi Apradh" | Pehchan | |
| 1972 (19th) | | Manna Dey ‡ | "Ae Bhai Zara Dekh Ke Chalo" | Mera Naam Joker | |
| 1972 (19th) | | Kishore Kumar | "Zindagi Ek Safar Hai Suhana" | Andaz | |
| 1972 (19th) | | Kishore Kumar | "Yeh Jo Mohabbat Hai" | Kati Patang | |
| 1973 (20th) | | Mukesh ‡ | "Jai Bolo Be-Imaan Ki" | Be-Imaan | |
| 1973 (20th) | | Mukesh | "Ek Pyar Ka Nagma Hain" | Shor | |
| 1973 (20th) | | Kishore Kumar | "Chingari Koi Bhadke" | Amar Prem | |
| 1974 (21st) | – | Narendra Chanchal ‡ | "Beshak Mandir Masjid" | Bobby | |
| 1974 (21st) | – | Kishore Kumar | "Mere Dil Mein Aaj" | Daag: A Poem of Love | |
| 1974 (21st) | – | Manna Dey | "Yaari Hai Imaan Mera" | Zanjeer | |
| 1974 (21st) | – | Mohammed Rafi | "Hum Ko Jaan Se Pyaari Hai" | Naina | |
| 1974 (21st) | – | Shailendra Singh | "Main Shayar To Nahin" | Bobby | |
| 1975 (22nd) | | Mahendra Kapoor ‡ | "Aur Nahi Bus Aur Nahi" | Roti Kapda Aur Makaan | |
| 1975 (22nd) | | Kishore Kumar | "Gaadi Bula Rahi Hai" | Dost | |
| 1975 (22nd) | | Kishore Kumar | "Mera Jeevan Kora Kagaz" | Kora Kagaz | |
| 1975 (22nd) | | Mohammed Rafi | "Accha Hi Hua Dil Toot Gaya" | Maa Bahen Aur Biwi | |
| 1975 (22nd) | | Mukesh | "Main Na Bhooloonga" | Roti Kapda Aur Makaan | |
| 1976 (23rd) | | Kishore Kumar ‡ | "Dil Aisa Kisi Ne" | Amanush | |
| 1976 (23rd) | | Kishore Kumar | "Main Pyaasa Tu Sawan" | Faraar | |
| 1976 (23rd) | | Kishore Kumar | "O Manjhi Re" | Khushboo | |
| 1976 (23rd) | | Manna Dey | "Kya Mar Sakegi" | Sanyasi | |
| 1976 (23rd) | | R. D. Burman | "Mehbooba O Mehbooba" | Sholay | |
| 1977 (24th) | | Mukesh (posthumous) † | "Kabhi Kabhie Mere Dil Mein" | Kabhi Kabhie | |
| 1977 (24th) | | Kishore Kumar | "Mere Naina Sawan Bhadon" | Mehbooba | |
| 1977 (24th) | | Mahendra Kapoor | "Sunke Teri Pukar" | Fakira | |
| 1977 (24th) | | Mukesh (posthumous) | "Ek Din Bik Jaayega" | Dharam Karam | |
| 1977 (24th) | | Mukesh (posthumous) | "Main Pal Do Pal Ka Shayar Hoon" | Kabhi Kabhie | |
| 1977 (24th) | | K. J. Yesudas | "Gori Tera Gaon" | Chitchor | |
| 1978 (25th) | | Mohammed Rafi ‡ | "Kya Hua Tera Waada" | Hum Kisise Kum Naheen | |
| 1978 (25th) | | Kishore Kumar | "Aap Ke Anurodh Pe" | Anurodh | |
| 1978 (25th) | | Mohammed Rafi | "Parda Hai Parda" | Amar Akbar Anthony | |
| 1978 (25th) | | Mukesh (posthumous) | "Suhaani Chandni" | Mukti | |
| 1978 (25th) | | K. J. Yesudas | Ka Karoon Sajni Aye Na Baalam | Swami | |
| 1979 (26th) | | Kishore Kumar ‡ | "Khaike Paan Banaraswala" | Don | |
| 1979 (26th) | | Kishore Kumar | "O Saathi Re" | Muqaddar Ka Sikandar | |
| 1979 (26th) | | Kishore Kumar | "Hum Bewafa Harghiz Na" | Shalimar | |
| 1979 (26th) | | Mohammed Rafi | "Aadmi Musafir Hai" | Apnapan | |
| 1979 (26th) | | Mukesh (posthumous) | "Chanchal Sheetal" | Satyam Shivam Sundaram | |

=== 1980s ===
| Year | Photos of winners | Singer | Song | Film | Ref. |
|---|---|---|---|---|---|
| 1980 (27th) | | K. J. Yesudas ‡ | "Dil Ke Tukde" | Dada | |
| 1980 (27th) | | Kishore Kumar | "Ek Rasta Hai Zindagi" | Kaala Patthar | |
| 1980 (27th) | | Mohammed Rafi | "Chalo Re Doli Uthao" | Jaani Dushman | |
| 1980 (27th) | | Nitin Mukesh | "Aaja Re Mere Dilbar" | Noorie | |
| 1981 (28th) | | Kishore Kumar ‡ | "Hazaar Raahen Mud Ke Dekhi" | Thodisi Bewafaii | |
| 1981 (28th) | | Kishore Kumar | "Om Shanti Om" | Karz | |
| 1981 (28th) | | Mohammed Rafi (posthumous) | "Dard-e-Dil" | Karz | |
| 1981 (28th) | | Mohammed Rafi (posthumous) | "Maine Puchha Chand Se" | Abdullah | |
| 1981 (28th) | | Mohammed Rafi (posthumous) | "Mere Dost Kissa" | Dostana | |
| 1982 (29th) | | Amit Kumar ‡ | "Yaad Aa Rahi Hai" | Love Story | |
| 1982 (29th) | | Jagjit Singh | "Hothon Se Chhoo Lo Tum" | Prem Geet | |
| 1982 (29th) | | Kishore Kumar | "Hamen Tum Se Pyaar Kitna" | Kudrat | |
| 1982 (29th) | | Kishore Kumar | "Chhoo Kar Mere Man Ko" | Yaarana | |
| 1982 (29th) | | S. P. Balasubrahmanyam | "Tere Mere Beech Mein" | Ek Duuje Ke Liye | |
| 1983 (30th) | | Kishore Kumar ‡ | "Pag Ghungroo Bandh" | Namak Halaal | |
| 1983 (30th) | | Amit Kumar | "Yeh Zameen Gaa Rahi Hai" | Teri Kasam | |
| 1983 (30th) | | Suresh Wadkar | "Mein Hoon Prem Rogi" | Prem Rog | |
| 1983 (30th) | | Suresh Wadkar | "Meri Kismat Tu" | Prem Rog | |
| 1984 (31st) | | Kishore Kumar ‡ | "Agar Tum Na Hote" | Agar Tum Na Hote | |
| 1984 (31st) | | Shabbir Kumar | "Jab Hum Jawaan Honge" | Betaab | |
| 1984 (31st) | | Kishore Kumar | "Shayad Meri Shaadi" | Souten | |
| 1984 (31st) | | Shabbir Kumar | "Parvaton Se Aaj Mein" | Betaab | |
| 1984 (31st) | | Shabbir Kumar | "Yaad Teri Aayengi" | Ek Jaan Hai Hum | |
| 1985 (32nd) | | Kishore Kumar ‡ | "Manzilein Apni Jagah Hain" | Sharaabi | |
| 1985 (32nd) | | Kishore Kumar | "De De Pyaar De" | Sharaabi | |
| 1985 (32nd) | | Kishore Kumar | "Inteha Ho Gayi" | Sharaabi | |
| 1985 (32nd) | | Kishore Kumar | "Log Kehte Hai" | Sharaabi | |
| 1986 (33rd) | | Kishore Kumar ‡ | "Saagar Kinare" | Saagar | |
| 1986 (33rd) | | Shabbir Kumar | "Tum Se Milkar Na Jane Kyon" | Pyaar Jhukta Nahin | |
| 1986 (33rd) | | Suresh Wadkar | "Main Hi Main Hoon" | Ram Teri Ganga Maili | |
| 1987 | NO CEREMONY | | | | |
| 1988 | NO CEREMONY | | | | |
| 1989 (34th) | | Udit Narayan ‡ | "Papa Kehte Hain" | Qayamat Se Qayamat Tak | |
| 1989 (34th) | | Amit Kumar | "Ek Do Teen" | Tezaab | |
| 1989 (34th) | | Kirti Kumar | "Main To Hoon Sab Ka" | Hatya | |

=== 1990s ===
| Year | Photos of winners | Singer | Song | Film | Ref. |
|---|---|---|---|---|---|
| 1990 (35th) | | S. P. Balasubrahmanyam ‡ | "Dil Deewana" | Maine Pyar Kiya | |
| 1990 (35th) | | Amit Kumar | "Tirchhi Topiwale" | Tridev | |
| 1990 (35th) | | Mohammed Aziz | "My Name Is Lakhan" | Ram Lakhan | |
| 1990 (35th) | | Suresh Wadkar | "Lagi Aaj Sawan Ki" | Chandni | |
| 1991 (36th) | | Kumar Sanu ‡ | "Ab Tere Bin Ji Lenge Hum" | Aashiqui | |
| 1991 (36th) | | Amit Kumar | "Kaisa Lagta Hai" | Baaghi: A Rebel for Love | |
| 1991 (36th) | | Suresh Wadkar | "O Priya Priya" | Dil | |
| 1992 (37th) | | Kumar Sanu ‡ | "Mera Dil Bhi Kitna Pagal Hai" | Saajan | |
| 1992 (37th) | | Pankaj Udhas | "Jeeye To Jeeye Kaise" | Saajan | |
| 1992 (37th) | | S. P. Balasubrahmanyam | "Tum Se Milne Ki Tamanna Hai" | Saajan | |
| 1992 (37th) | | Sudesh Bhonsle | "Jumma Chumma" | Hum | |
| 1993 (38th) | | Kumar Sanu ‡ | "Sochenge Tumhe Pyar" | Deewana | |
| 1993 (38th) | | Udit Narayan | "Pehla Nasha" | Jo Jeeta Wohi Sikandar | |
| 1993 (38th) | | Vinod Rathod | "Aisi Deewangi" | Deewana | |
| 1994 (39th) | | Kumar Sanu ‡ | "Yeh Kaali Kaali Aankhen" | Baazigar | |
| 1994 (39th) | | Kumar Sanu | "Baazigar O Baazigar" | Baazigar | |
| 1994 (39th) | | Udit Narayan | "Phoolon Sa Chehra Tera" | Anari | |
| 1994 (39th) | | Udit Narayan | "Jaadu Teri Nazar" | Darr | |
| 1994 (39th) | | Vinod Rathod | "Nayak Nahin Kahlnayak Hoon Main" | Khalnayak | |
| 1995 (40th) | | Kumar Sanu ‡ | "Ek Ladki Ko Dekha" | 1942: A Love Story | |
| 1995 (40th) | | Kumar Sanu | "Kuch Na Kaho" | 1942: A Love Story | |
| 1995 (40th) | | Abhijeet | "Ole Ole" | Yeh Dillagi | |
| 1995 (40th) | | S. P. Balasubrahmanyam | "Hum Aapke Hain Koun" | Hum Aapke Hain Koun..! | |
| 1995 (40th) | | Udit Narayan | "Tu Cheez Badi" | Mohra | |
| 1996 (41st) | | Udit Narayan ‡ | "Mehndi Laga Ke Rakhna" | Dilwale Dulhania Le Jayenge | |
| 1996 (41st) | | Kumar Sanu | "Tujhe Dekha To" | Dilwale Dulhania Le Jayenge | |
| 1996 (41st) | | Udit Narayan | "Raja Ko Rani Se Pyaar" | Akele Hum Akele Tum | |
| 1996 (41st) | | Kumar Sanu | "Tu Mile Dil Khile" | Criminal | |
| 1996 (41st) | | Hariharan | "Dil Ne Dil Se" | Haqeeqat | |
| 1997 (42nd) | | Udit Narayan ‡ | "Pardesi Pardesi" | Raja Hindustani | |
| 1997 (42nd) | | Abhijeet | "Yeh Teri Aankhen Jhuki Jhuki" | Fareb | |
| 1997 (42nd) | | Hariharan and Suresh Wadkar | "Chappa Chappa Charkha Chale" | Maachis | |
| 1997 (42nd) | | Udit Narayan | "Ho Nahi Sakta" | Diljale | |
| 1997 (42nd) | | Udit Narayan | "Ghar Se Nikalte Hi" | Papa Kahte Hain | |
| 1998 (43rd) | | Abhijeet ‡ | "Main Koi Aisa Geet Gaoon" | Yes Boss | |
| 1998 (43rd) | | Kumar Sanu | "Do Dil Mil Rahe Hain" | Pardes | |
| 1998 (43rd) | | Sonu Nigam and Roop Kumar Rathod | "Sandese Aate Hai" | Border | |
| 1998 (43rd) | | Udit Narayan | "Dil To Pagal Hai" | Dil To Pagal Hai | |
| 1998 (43rd) | | Hariharan | "I Love My India" | Pardes | |
| 1999 (44th) | | Sukhwinder Singh ‡ | "Chaiyya Chaiyya" | Dil Se.. | |
| 1999 (44th) | | Kumar Sanu | "Ladki Badi Anjaani Hai" | Kuch Kuch Hota Hai | |
| 1999 (44th) | | Udit Narayan | "Kuch Kuch Hota Hai" | Kuch Kuch Hota Hai | |
| 1999 (44th) | | Aamir Khan | "Aati Kya Khandala" | Ghulam | |
| 1999 (44th) | | Kamaal Khan | "O O Jaane Jaana" | Pyaar Kiya To Darna Kya | |

=== 2000s ===
| Year | Photos of winners | Singer | Song | Film | Ref. |
|---|---|---|---|---|---|
| 2000 (45th) | | Udit Narayan ‡ | "Chaand Chhupa Badal Mein" | Hum Dil De Chuke Sanam | |
| 2000 (45th) | | KK | "Tadap Tadap" | Hum Dil De Chuke Sanam | |
| 2000 (45th) | | Kumar Sanu | "Aankhon Ki Gusthakiyaan" | Hum Dil De Chuke Sanam | |
| 2000 (45th) | | Sonu Nigam | "Ishq Bina" | Taal | |
| 2000 (45th) | | Sukhwinder Singh | "Ramta Jogi" | Taal | |
| 2001 (46th) | | Lucky Ali ‡ | "Naa Tum Jaano Naa Hum" | Kaho Naa... Pyaar Hai | |
| 2001 (46th) | | Lucky Ali | "Ek Pal Ka Jeena" | Kaho Naa... Pyaar Hai | |
| 2001 (46th) | | Sonu Nigam | "Tu Fiza Hai" | Fiza | |
| 2001 (46th) | | Sonu Nigam | "Panchhi Nadiya Pawan Ke Jhonke" | Refugee | |
| 2001 (46th) | | Udit Narayan | "Dil Ne Yeh Kaha Hain" | Dhadkan | |
| 2002 (47th) | | Udit Narayan ‡ | "Mitwa" | Lagaan | |
| 2002 (47th) | | Adnan Sami | "Mehbooba Mehbooba" | Ajnabee | |
| 2002 (47th) | | Shaan | "Koi Kahe Kehta Rahe" | Dil Chahta Hai | |
| 2002 (47th) | | Sonu Nigam | "Suraj Hua Maddham" | Kabhi Khushi Kabhie Gham | |
| 2002 (47th) | | Udit Narayan | "Ud Jaa Kaale Kawaan" | Gadar: Ek Prem Katha | |
| 2003 (48th) | | Sonu Nigam ‡ | "Saathiya" | Saathiya | |
| 2003 (48th) | | KK | "Bardaasht Nahin" | Humraaz | |
| 2003 (48th) | | Kumar Sanu | "Sanam Mere Humraaz" | Humraaz | |
| 2003 (48th) | | Lucky Ali | "Aa Bhi Jaa" | Sur – The Melody of Life | |
| 2003 (48th) | | Shaan | "Nikamma Kiya Is Dil Ne" | Kyaa Dil Ne Kahaa | |
| 2004 (49th) | | Sonu Nigam ‡ | "Kal Ho Naa Ho" | Kal Ho Naa Ho | |
| 2004 (49th) | | Abhijeet | "Suno Na" | Chalte Chalte | |
| 2004 (49th) | | Kumar Sanu | "Kissi Se Tum Pyar Karo" | Andaaz | |
| 2004 (49th) | | Udit Narayan | "Idhar Chala" | Koi... Mil Gaya | |
| 2004 (49th) | | Udit Narayan | "Tere Naam" | Tere Naam | |
| 2005 (50th) | | Kunal Ganjawala ‡ | "Bheegey Honth Tere" | Murder | |
| 2005 (50th) | | Sonu Nigam | "Main Hoon Na" | Main Hoon Na | |
| 2005 (50th) | | Sonu Nigam | "Tumse Milkey Dil Ka" | Main Hoon Na | |
| 2005 (50th) | | Sonu Nigam | "Do Pal" | Veer-Zaara | |
| 2005 (50th) | | Udit Narayan | "Main Yahaan Hoon" | Veer-Zaara | |
| 2005 (50th) | | Udit Narayan and Master Vignesh | "Yeh Taara Woh Taara" | Swades | |
| 2006 (51st) | | Himesh Reshammiya ‡ | "Aashiq Banaya Aapne" | Aashiq Banaya Aapne | |
| 2006 (51st) | | Sonu Nigam | "Piyu Bole" | Parineeta | |
| 2006 (51st) | | Atif Aslam | "Woh Lamhe" | Zeher | |
| 2006 (51st) | | Sonu Nigam | "Dheere Jalna" | Paheli | |
| 2006 (51st) | | Shaan and KK | "Dus Bahane" | Dus | |
| 2007 (52nd) | | Shaan and Kailash Kher ‡ | "Chand Sifarish" | Fanaa | |
| 2007 (52nd) | | Atif Aslam | "Tere Bin" | Bas Ek Pal | |
| 2007 (52nd) | | Himesh Reshammiya | "Jhalak Dikhlaja" | Aksar | |
| 2007 (52nd) | | Sonu Nigam | "Kabhi Alvida Naa Kehna" | Kabhi Alvida Naa Kehna | |
| 2007 (52nd) | | Zubeen Garg | "Ya Ali" | Gangster | |
| 2008 (53rd) | | Shaan ‡ | "Jab Se Tere Naina" | Saawariya | |
| 2008 (53rd) | | A. R. Rahman | "Tere Bina" | Guru | |
| 2008 (53rd) | | KK | "Aankhon Mein Teri" | Om Shanti Om | |
| 2008 (53rd) | | Sonu Nigam | "Main Agar Kahoon" | Om Shanti Om | |
| 2008 (53rd) | | Sukhwinder Singh | "Chak De India" | Chak De! India | |
| 2009 (54th) | | Sukhwinder Singh ‡ | "Haule Haule" | Rab Ne Bana Di Jodi | |
| 2009 (54th) | | Farhan Akhtar | "Socha Hai" | Rock On!! | |
| 2009 (54th) | | KK | "Khuda Jaane" | Bachna Ae Haseeno | |
| 2009 (54th) | | KK | "Zara Sa" | Jannat | |
| 2009 (54th) | | Rashid Ali | "Kabhi Kabhi Aditi" | Jaane Tu... Ya Jaane Na | |
| 2009 (54th) | | Sonu Nigam | "Inn Lamhon Ke Daaman Me" | Jodhaa Akbar | |

=== 2010s ===
| Year | Photos of winners | Singer | Song | Film | Ref. |
|---|---|---|---|---|---|
| 2010 (55th) | | Mohit Chauhan ‡ | "Masakali" | Delhi-6 | |
| 2010 (55th) | | Atif Aslam | "Tu Jaane Na" | Ajab Prem Ki Ghazab Kahani | |
| 2010 (55th) | | Javed Ali and Kailash Kher | "Arziyan" | Delhi-6 | |
| 2010 (55th) | | Rahat Fateh Ali Khan | "Aaj Din Chadheya" | Love Aaj Kal | |
| 2010 (55th) | | Sonu Nigam and Salim Merchant | "Shukran Allah" | Kurbaan | |
| 2010 (55th) | | Sukhwinder Singh and Vishal Dadlani | "Dhan Te Nan" | Kaminey | |
| 2011 (56th) | | Rahat Fateh Ali Khan ‡ | "Dil Toh Bachcha Hai Ji" | Ishqiya | |
| 2011 (56th) | | Adnan Sami and Shankar Mahadevan | "Noor-e-Khuda" | My Name Is Khan | |
| 2011 (56th) | | Mohit Chauhan | "Pee Loon" | Once Upon a Time in Mumbaai | |
| 2011 (56th) | | Shafqat Amanat Ali | "Bin Tere" | I Hate Luv Storys | |
| 2011 (56th) | | Rahat Fateh Ali Khan | "Sajda" | My Name Is Khan | |
| 2012 (57th) | | Mohit Chauhan ‡ | "Jo Bhi Main" | Rockstar | |
| 2012 (57th) | | Akon and Vishal Dadlani | "Chammak Challo" | Ra.One | |
| 2012 (57th) | | Mohit Chauhan | "Sadda Haq" | Rockstar | |
| 2012 (57th) | | Rahat Fateh Ali Khan | "Teri Meri" | Bodyguard | |
| 2012 (57th) | | Shafqat Amanat Ali | "Dildaara" | Ra.One | |
| 2013 (58th) | | Ayushmann Khurrana ‡ | "Pani Da Rang" | Vicky Donor | |
| 2013 (58th) | | Mohit Chauhan | "Barfi" | Barfi! | |
| 2013 (58th) | | Nikhil Paul George | "Main Kya Karoon" | Barfi! | |
| 2013 (58th) | | Rabbi Shergill | "Challa" | Jab Tak Hai Jaan | |
| 2013 (58th) | | Sonu Nigam | "Abhi Mujh Mein Kahin" | Agneepath | |
| 2014 (59th) | | Arijit Singh ‡ | "Tum Hi Ho" | Aashiqui 2 | |
| 2014 (59th) | | Amit Trivedi | "Manja" | Kai Po Che! | |
| 2014 (59th) | | Ankit Tiwari | "Sunn Raha Hai" | Aashiqui 2 | |
| 2014 (59th) | | Benny Dayal | "Badtameez Dil" | Yeh Jawaani Hai Deewani | |
| 2014 (59th) | | Siddharth Mahadevan | "Zinda" | Bhaag Milkha Bhaag | |
| 2015 (60th) | | Ankit Tiwari ‡ | "Galliyan" | Ek Villain | |
| 2015 (60th) | | Arijit Singh | "Suno Na Sangemarmar" | Youngistaan | |
| 2015 (60th) | | Arijit Singh | "Mast Magan" | 2 States | |
| 2015 (60th) | | Benny Dayal | "Locha-e-Ulfat" | 2 States | |
| 2015 (60th) | | Shekhar Ravjiani | "Zehnaseeb" | Hasee Toh Phasee | |
| 2016 (61st) | | Arijit Singh ‡ | "Sooraj Dooba Hain" | Roy | |
| 2016 (61st) | | Ankit Tiwari | "Tu Hai Ke Nahi" | Roy | |
| 2016 (61st) | | Arijit Singh | "Gerua" | Dilwale | |
| 2016 (61st) | | Atif Aslam | "Jeena Jeena" | Badlapur | |
| 2016 (61st) | | Papon | "Moh Moh Ke Dhaage" | Dum Laga Ke Haisha | |
| 2016 (61st) | | Vishal Dadlani | "Gulaabo" | Shaandaar | |
| 2017 (62nd) | | Arijit Singh ‡ | "Ae Dil Hai Mushkil" | Ae Dil Hai Mushkil | |
| 2017 (62nd) | | Amit Mishra | "Bulleya" | Ae Dil Hai Mushkil | |
| 2017 (62nd) | | Arijit Singh | "Channa Mereya" | Ae Dil Hai Mushkil | |
| 2017 (62nd) | | Atif Aslam | "Tere Sang Yaara" | Rustom | |
| 2017 (62nd) | | Rahat Fateh Ali Khan | "Jag Ghoomeya" | Sultan | |
| 2018 (63rd) | | Arijit Singh ‡ | "Roke Na Ruke Naina" | Badrinath Ki Dulhania | |
| 2018 (63rd) | | Akhil Sachdeva | "Humsafar" | Badrinath Ki Dulhania | |
| 2018 (63rd) | | Arijit Singh | "Zaalima" | Raees | |
| 2018 (63rd) | | Arko Pravo Mukherjee | "Nazm Nazm" | Bareilly Ki Barfi | |
| 2018 (63rd) | | Ash King | "Baarish" | Half Girlfriend | |
| 2018 (63rd) | | Sachin Sanghvi | "Kho Diya" | Bhoomi | |
| 2019 (64th) | | Arijit Singh ‡ | "Ae Watan (Male)" | Raazi | |
| 2019 (64th) | | Abhay Jodhpurkar | "Mera Naam Tu" | Zero | |
| 2019 (64th) | | Arijit Singh | "Binte Dil" | Padmaavat | |
| 2019 (64th) | | Arijit Singh | "Tera Yaar Hoon Main" | Sonu Ke Titu Ki Sweety | |
| 2019 (64th) | | Baadshah | "Tareefan" | Veere Di Wedding | |
| 2019 (64th) | | Shankar Mahadevan | "Dilbaro" | Raazi | |

=== 2020s ===
| Year | Photos of winners | Singer | Song | Film | Ref. |
|---|---|---|---|---|---|
| 2020 (65th) | | Arijit Singh ‡ | "Kalank" | Kalank | |
| 2020 (65th) | | Arijit Singh | "Ve Maahi" | Kesari | |
| 2020 (65th) | | B Praak | "Teri Mitti" | Kesari | |
| 2020 (65th) | | Nakash Aziz | "Slow Motion" | Bharat | |
| 2020 (65th) | | Sachet Tandon | "Bekhayali" | Kabir Singh | |
| 2021 (66th) | – | Raghav Chaitanya ‡ | "Ek Tukda Dhoop" | Thappad | |
| 2021 (66th) | – | Arijit Singh | "Shayad" | Love Aaj Kal | |
| 2021 (66th) | – | Arijit Singh | "Aabad Barbaad" | Ludo | |
| 2021 (66th) | – | Ayushmann Khurrana | "Mere Liye Tum Kaafi Ho" | Shubh Mangal Zyada Saavdhan | |
| 2021 (66th) | – | Darshan Raval | "Mehrama" | Love Aaj Kal | |
| 2022 (67th) | | B Praak ‡ | "Mann Bharryaa" | Shershaah | |
| 2022 (67th) | | Arijit Singh | "Lehra Do" | 83 | |
| 2022 (67th) | | Arijit Singh | "Rait Zara Si" | Atrangi Re | |
| 2022 (67th) | | Devender Pal Singh | "Lakeeran" | Haseen Dillruba | |
| 2022 (67th) | | Jubin Nautiyal | "Raataan Lambiyan" | Shershaah | |
| 2023 (68th) | | Arijit Singh ‡ | "Kesariya" | Brahmāstra: Part One – Shiva | |
| 2023 (68th) | | Abhay Jodhpurkar | "Maange Manzooriyan" | Badhaai Do | |
| 2023 (68th) | | Arijit Singh | "Apna Bana Le" | Bhediya | |
| 2023 (68th) | | Arijit Singh | "Deva Deva" | Brahmāstra: Part One – Shiva | |
| 2023 (68th) | | Sonu Nigam | "Main Ki Karaan?" | Laal Singh Chaddha | |
| 2024 (69th) | | Bhupinder Babbal ‡ | "Arjan Vailley" | Animal | |
| 2024 (69th) | | Arijit Singh | "Lutt Putt Gaya" | Dunki | |
| 2024 (69th) | | Arijit Singh | "Satranga" | Animal | |
| 2024 (69th) | | Shahid Mallya | "Kudmayi" | Rocky Aur Rani Kii Prem Kahaani | |
| 2024 (69th) | | Sonu Nigam | "Nikle The Kabhi Hum Ghar Se" | Dunki | |
| 2024 (69th) | | Varun Jain, Sachin-Jigar, Shadaab Faridi, Altamash Faridi | "Tere Vaaste" | Zara Hatke Zara Bachke | |
| 2025 (70th) | | Arijit Singh ‡ | "Sajni" | Laapataa Ladies | |
| 2025 (70th) | | Javed Ali | "Mirza" | Maidaan | |
| 2025 (70th) | | Karan Aujla | "Tauba Tauba" | Bad Newz | |
| 2025 (70th) | | Pawan Singh | "Aayi Nayi" | Stree 2 | |
| 2025 (70th) | | Sonu Nigam | "Mere Dholna 3.0" | Bhool Bhulaiyaa 3 | |

== See also ==
- Filmfare Award for Best Female Playback Singer
- Filmfare Awards
- Bollywood
- Cinema of India
