= Anari (1959 film) =

Indian comedy film

- Poster
- Directed by: Hrishikesh Mukherjee
- Written by: Inder Raj Anand
- Produced by: L. B. Lachman
- Starring: Raj Kapoor; Nutan; Motilal; Lalita Pawar
- Cinematography: Jaywant Pathare
- Edited by: Hrishikesh Mukherjee
- Music by: Manna Dey; Shankar–Jaikishan
- Release date: 16 January 1959
- Running time: 166 minutes
- Country: India
- Language: Hindi
- Box office: 3 Crore

Anari is a 1959 Indian Hindi-language comedy film directed by Hrishikesh Mukherjee. The film stars Raj Kapoor, Nutan, Motilal and Lalita Pawar. The music was by Shankar Jaikishan and the lyrics by Hasrat Jaipuri and Shailendra. This was among the few films in which Lalita Pawar played a positive role and Motilal a role with shades of grey. The film was remade in Tamil as Pasamum Nesamum (1964) and in Turkish as Derbeder (1960), Enayi (1974).

It became the highest-grossing film of 1959 with Box Office India declaring it "Super Hit".

== Plot ==
Raj Kumar is an honest, handsome, and intelligent young man. Working only as a sole trader painter, he is unable to earn a living, including paying rent to his kind-hearted and talkative landlady, Mrs. D'sa. One day, Raj finds a wallet containing money and returns it to the owner, Mr. Ramnath. Ramnath admires Raj; satisfied with his honesty, he employs Raj to work in his office as a clerk. Raj meets Ramnath's maidservant Asha and they fall in love with each other. This all ends when Raj finds out that Asha is really Aarti, the niece of his employer and she had lied about her poverty only to get close to Raj. Unfortunately, his landlady Mrs. D'sa dies suddenly consuming medicine manufactured by Mr. Ramnath. The police conduct a post-mortem and as a result, conclude that someone poisoned Mrs. D'sa. The police take Raj for questioning as the prime suspect, arrest him, and hold him in jail. In the trial, however, Ramnath admits full responsibility for the tainted medicine, clearing Raj of the charges. Aarti tells Raj she promised Mrs. D'sa she would take care of him, someone who is "as big an idiot as the world is clever," giving a sense that they will marry.

== Cast ==
- Raj Kapoor as Raj Kumar
- Nutan as Aarti Sohanlal / Asha
- Lalita Pawar as Mrs. L. D'Sa
- Shubha Khote as Asha
- Motilal as Seth. Ramnath Sohanlal
- Mukri as Kamdaar
- Nana Palsikar as Evil Priest
- Ruby Mayer as Girl's College Facilitator
- Cuckoo Moray as Aarti's friend

== Soundtrack ==
#	Title	Singer(s)	Music director	Lyricist	Duration	Raga
1	"Dil Ki Nazar Se"	Lata Mangeshkar, Mukesh	Shankar Jaikishan	Shailendra	04:38	
2	"Nineteen Fifty Six"	Lata Mangeshkar, Manna Dey	Manna Dey, Shankar Jaikishan	Shailendra	04:59	
3	"Woh Chand Khila Woh Tare"	Lata Mangeshkar, Mukesh	Shankar Jaikishan	Hasrat Jaipuri	04:13	
4	"Sab Kuchh Seekha Ham Ne"	Mukesh	Shankar Jaikishan	Shailendra	03:40	
5	"Ban Ke Panchhi Gaaye Pyar Ka Tarana"	Lata Mangeshkar	Shankar Jaikishan	Hasrat Jaipuri	03:35	
6	"Kisi Ki Muskurahaton Pe"	Mukesh	Shankar Jaikishan	Shailendra	04:31	
7	"Tera Jana"	Lata Mangeshkar	Shankar Jaikishan	Shailendra	03:41	Bhairavi

== Trivia ==
Motilal plays Nutan's uncle in the film. In real life, he lived with Nutan's mother, Shobhana Samarth.

In the office scene Mukri says " Aaj ka kaam Kal Karo, Kal ka kaam parson..." this dialogue was repeated by Hrishikesh Mukherjee in his 1979 film Gol Maal.

== Awards ==
- 1960 Filmfare Best Actor Award - Raj Kapoor
- 1960 Filmfare Best Music Director Award for Shankar Jaikishan
- 1960 Filmfare Best Supporting Actress Award for Lalita Pawar
- 1960 Filmfare Best Lyricist Award for Shailendra for "Sab Kuchh Seekha Ham Ne"
- 1960 Filmfare Best Male Playback Award for Mukesh for "Sab Kuchh Seekha Ham Ne"
- 1959: President's silver medal for Best Feature Film in Hindi
