= Sab Kuch Seekha Humne =

Song from Hindi movie

Song by Mukesh

from the album Anari 1959
- Released: 13 January 1959
- Studio: R.K. Studio
- Length: 3:40
- Songwriter: Shailendra
- Composer: Shankar-Jaikishan

"Sab Kuch Seekha Humne" is a song from the 1959's Hindi film Anari. The song is sung by Mukesh and lyrics written by Shailendra.

== Description ==
Sab Kuch Seekha Humne is a song from the Anari Hindi film which has a duration of 3:40 minutes. Mukesh won the Filmfare Award for Best Male Playback Singer for this song, which was the first Filmfare Award for Playback Singer. The lyrics are penned by Shailendra and the music director is Shankar Jaikishan. In addition, Shailendra won the Filmfare Award for Best Lyricist for lyrics.

== Awards ==
S. no.	Award	Nomination	Result
1.	Filmfare Best Male Playback Singer	Mukesh	Won
2.	Filmfare Award for Best Lyricist	Shailendra	Won
