= Vidhana Naach Nachawe =

1968 Indian Bhojpuri-language film

- Directed by: K. Prasad Shukla
- Produced by: Jamnadas Jhaveri
- Starring: Mumtaz; Sujit Kumar
- Music by: Dattaram
- Release date: 1968
- Running time: 140
- Country: India
- Language: Bhojpuri

Vidhana Naach Nachawe (Bhojpuri for Fate makes you dance) is a 1968 Indian Bhojpuri-language romantic drama film produced by Jamnadas Jhaveri and directed by K. Prasad Shukla. The film stars Mumtaz and Sujit Kumar in lead roles, with music composed by Dattaram.

The film's prominence stems from the celebrated roles of its lead stars. Vidhana Naach Nachawe marked the only Bhojpuri film in which actress Mumtaz—who played the lead female role—appeared just before winning the Filmfare Award for Best Actress for the Hindi film Khilona (1970). Mumtaz is now regarded as one of the most iconic and most beautiful actress of Hindi cinema and is often considered to be one of its hottest stars of all time. In addition, Sujit Kumar, the film's lead male star, is celebrated as one of Bhojpuri cinema's most distinguished figures for his enduring contributions to the industry. Together, their involvement elevates Vidhana Naach Nachawe as a pivotal work in the historical development of Bhojpuri cinema.

== Cast ==
- Mumtaz
- Sujit Kumar

== Soundtrack ==
The film's music was composed by Dattaram, with lyrics written by Shailendra.

Soundtrack
No.	Song	Singer(s)	Source
1	Gori Tore Naina Chain Churaile	Mohammed Rafi	
2	Dhire Dhire Nayanva	Mohammed Rafi, Suman Kalyanpur	
3	Dekh Dekh Hansela	Lata Mangeshkar	
4	More Urje Re Nayanva	Mohammed Rafi, Suman Kalyanpur	
