= Jewel Thief =

Jewel Thief may refer to:

- Jewel Thief (1937 film), or Amateur Crook, an American romantic comedy
- Jewel Thief (1967 film), an Indian Hindi-language spy thriller film
- Jewel Thief (2024 film), an Indian Telugu-language suspense thriller film
- Jewel Thief (2025 film), an Indian Hindi-language heist film
