= Dattaram Wadkar =

Indian music arranger and director

- Born: 1929; Goa, British India (present-day Goa, India)
- Died: 8 June 2007 (aged 77–78); North Goa, Goa, India
- Occupation(s): Tabla player, Music arranger Music director, Composer
- Years active: 1949-1977

Dattaram Wadkar (1929 – 8 June 2007), was a prominent Indian music arranger and music director known for his long association with the film music composers duo Shankar–Jaikishan and as an independent music composer for movies like Ab Dilli Dur Nahin, Parvarish, Shriman Satyawadi etc.

== Career ==
Dattaram moved to Bombay in 1942 where he learnt tabla and the dholak. Shankar introduced him to the Prithvi theatres and soon he joined Shankar – Jaikishan's team as arranger and percussionist, Dattaram managed Shankar–Jaikishan's rhythm section. Shankar–Jaikishan encouraged and supported Dattaram to compose music for films independently.
