= List of Hindi films of 1972 =

The following is a list of films produced by the Bollywood film industry based in Mumbai in 1972:

== Highest-grossing films ==
These are the highest-grossing Hindi films of 1972. Gross collection figures are domestic, unless otherwise noted.

| Rank | Title | Gross collection | Notes |
|---|---|---|---|
| 1 | Dushmun | ₹9 crore | Worldwide gross |
| 2 | Pakeezah | ₹8.12 crore | Worldwide gross |
| 3 | Raja Jani | ₹7.40 crore | Worldwide gross |
| 4 | Seeta Aur Geeta | ₹6.50 crore | |
| 5 | Victoria No. 203 | ₹6.02 crore | Worldwide gross |
| 6 | Be-Imaan | ₹4.50 crore | |
| 7 | Gora Aur Kala | ₹4.40 crore | |
| 8 | Apna Desh | ₹4.20 crore | |
| 9 | Jawani Diwani | ₹3.50 crore | |
| 10 | Samadhi | ₹3.20 crore | |

== A–Z ==
| Title | Director | Cast | Genre | Sources |
|---|---|---|---|---|
| Aan Baan | Prakash Mehra | Rajendra Kumar, Raakhee, Pran | Drama | |
| Aankh Micholi | Ramanna | Rakesh Roshan, Bharathi Vishnuvardhan, Farida Jalal | Drama | |
| Aankhon Aankhon Mein | Raghunath Jhalani | Rakesh Roshan, Raakhee, Pran | Drama and suspense | |
| Amar Prem | Shakti Samanta | Rajesh Khanna, Sharmila Tagore, Vinod Mehra | Drama | |
| Annadata | Asit Sen | Jaya Bachchan, Anil Dhawan | Drama | |
| Anokha Daan | Asit Sen | Kabir Bedi, Tarun Bose, Anil Dhawan, Zaheera | Drama | |
| Anokha Milan | Jagannath Chatterjee | Dilip Kumar, Dharmendra, Pranoti Ghost | Drama | |
| Anokhi Pehchan | Satyen Bose | Sanjay Khan, Raakhee, Simi Garewal, Nirupa Roy, Jagdeep | Drama | |
| Anuraag | Shakti Samanta | Nutan, Rajesh Khanna, Vinod Mehra, Mousumi Chatterji | Drama | |
| Apna Desh | Jambu | Rajesh Khanna, Mumtaz | Drama | |
| Apradh | Feroz Khan | Feroz Khan, Mumtaz | Action | |
| Babul Ki Galiyaan | S.D. Narang | Sanjay Khan, Hema Malini, Shatrughan Sinha | Drama | |
| Baharon Phool Barsao | Indira Mathur | Dheeraj Kumar, Anjana, Sulochana Latkar | Drama | |
| Bandagi | K. Shankar | Vinod Mehra, Shandya Roy, Pandari Bai, Sujit Kumar, Madan Puri | Romance | |
| Bansi Birju | Prakash Verma | Amitabh Bachchan, Jaya Bachchan | Romance | |
| Bharat Ke Shaheed | Vishram Bedekar | Subhash Ghai, Ramesh Deo, Seema Deo, Tabassum Govil, Azaad Irani, Mehmood Jr., Reema Rakesh Nath, Kartar Singh (Sikh man in army), Ram Avtar, Bhushan Tiwari, Kedarnath Saigal | Drama | |
| Bawarchi | Hrishikesh Mukherjee | Rajesh Khanna, Jaya Bachchan | Comedy | |
| Be-Imaan | Sohanlal Kanwar | Manoj Kumar, Raakhee, Pran | Action | |
| Bees Saal Pehle | Probir Roy | Vinod Mehra, Sharita Joshi, Farida Jalal, Lalita Pawar | Drama | |
| Bindiya Aur Bandook | Shibu Mitra | Kiran Kumar, Asha Sachdev, Laxmi Chaya, Raza Murad, | Action | |
| Bhai Ho To Aisa | Manmohan Desai | Jeetendra, Hema Malini, Shatrughan Sinha | Drama | |
| Bombay to Goa | S. Ramanathan | Amitabh Bachchan, Shatrughan Sinha, Aruna Irani, Mehmood | Drama | |
| Buniyaad | Virender Sinha | Rakesh Roshan, Shatrughan Sinha, Yogeeta Bali, Pran | Drama | |
| Dastaan | B. R. Chopra | Dilip Kumar, Sharmila Tagore, Bindu | Drama | |
| Dharkan | Devendra Goel | Sanjay Khan, Mumtaz | Thriller | |
| Dil Daulat Duniya | Prem Narayan Arora | Rajesh Khanna, Sadhana Shivdasani, Ashok Kumar, Helen | Drama | |
| Dil Ka Raja | P. Madhavan | Waheeda Rehman, Raaj Kumar | Action | |
| Do Bachche Dus Haath | Kalpataru | Nasir Ahmad Ansari, Prem Nath | Drama | |
| Do Chor | Padmanabh | Dharmendra, Tanuja | Action | |
| Do Gaz Zameen Ke Neeche | Tulsi Ramsay | Satyendra Kapoor | Horror | |
| Do Yaar | Kewal Misra | Vinod Khanna, Rekha, Shatrughan Sinha | Action | |
| Double Cross | Gogi Anand | Vijay Anand, Rekha | Action | |
| Ek Adhuri Kahani | Mrinal Sen | Utpal Dutt, Shekhar Chatterjee | Drama | |
| Ek Bar Mooskura Do | Ram Mukherjee | Shobhna Samarth, Joy Mukherjee, Tanuja, Deb Mukherjee | Drama | |
| Ek Bechara | S. M. Abbas | Jeetendra, Rekha, Vinod Khanna, Pran | Drama | |
| Ek Hasina Do Diwane | S. M. Abbas | Jeetendra, Babita, Vinod Khanna | Romance | |
| Ek Khiladi Bawan Pattey | Ravi Khanna | Vinod Khanna, Ravi Khanna, Laxmi Chahya | | |
| Ek Nazar | B. R. Ishara | Amitabh Bachchan, Jaya Bachchan, Nadira | Romance | |
| Gaon Hamara Shaher Tumhara | Naresh Kumar | Rajendra Kumar, Rekha | Romance | |
| Garam Masala | Aspi Irani | Aruna Irani, Mehmood | Comedy | |
| Gomti Ke Kinare | Saawan Kumar Tak | Meena Kumari, Sameer Khan, Mumtaz | Drama | |
| Gora Aur Kala | Naresh Kumar | Rekha, Rajendra Kumar, Hema Malini | Action | |
| Grahan | Arvind Kumar Sinha | Nutan, Shubash Gai | Drama | |
| Haar Jeet | C. P. Dixit | Rehana Sultan, Anil Dhawan | Drama | |
| Hari Darshan | Chandrakant | Dara Singh, B. Saroja Devi | Fantasy | |
| Jai Jwala | Manohar Deepak | Sunil Dutt, Madhumati, Nazneen, Sujit Kumar | Drama | |
| Jangal Mein Mangal | Rajendra Bhatia | Kiran Kumar, Reena Roy, Pran | Romance | |
| Janwar Aur Insaan | Tapi Chanakya | Shashi Kapoor, Raakhee | Drama | |
| Jawani Diwani | Narendra Bedi | Randhir Kapoor, Jaya Bachchan | Romance | |
| Jeet | Adurthi Subba Rao | Randhir Kapoor, Babita | Romance | |
| Joroo Ka Ghulam | A. Bhimsingh | Rajesh Khanna, Nanda, Om Prakash | Comedy | |
| Koshish | Sampooran Singh Gulzar | Sanjeev Kumar, Jaya Bachchan | Romance, Drama | |
| Lalkar | Ramanand Sagar | Dharmendra, Rajendra Kumar, Mala Sinha, Kum Kum | Action | |
| Maalik | A. Bhimsingh | Rajesh Khanna, Sharmila Tagore | Drama | |
| Man Jaiye | B. R. Ishara | Rakesh Pandhya | Drama | |
| Maya Darpan | Kumar Shahani | Aditi, Anil Pandya | Drama | |
| Mehmil | Bibhuti Mitra | Shatrughan Sinha | | |
| Mere Bhaiya | Satyen Bose | Vijay Arora, Nazima, Suresh Chatwal | Drama | |
| Mere Jeevan Saathi | Ravikant Nagaich | Rajesh Khanna, Tanuja | Romance | |
| Midnight | Raju | Nazreen | Romance | |
| Milap | B. R. Ishara | Shatrughan Sinha, Reena Roy, Danny Denzongpa | Action | |
| Mome Ki Gudiya | Mohan Kumar | Ratan Chopra, Tanuja | Drama | |
| Pakeezah | Kamal Amrohi | Raaj Kumar, Meena Kumari, Ashok Kumar | Drama | |
| Parchhaiyan | Sharankumar Chand | Vinod Khanna, Reshma, Sujit Kumar, Bindu | Drama | |
| Parichay | Sampooran Singh Gulzar | Jeetendra, Sanjeev Kumar, Asrani, Jaya Bachchan, Pran | Drama | |
| Piya Ka Ghar | Basu Chatterjee | Anil Dhawan, Jaya Badhuri | Drama | |
| Pyaar Diwana | Samar Chatterjee | Kishore Kumar, Mumtaz | Comedy | |
| Raampur Ka Lakshman | Manmohan Desai | Randhir Kapoor, Shatrughan Sinha, Rekha | Drama | |
| Raaste Kaa Patthar | Mukul Dutt | Amitabh Bachchan, Laxmi Chaya, Shatrughan Sinha | Action | |
| Raja Jani | Mohan Segal | Dharmendra, Hema Malini, Prem Nath | Drama | |
| Rakhi Aur Hathkadi | S. M. Sagar | Ashok Kumar, Vijay Arora, Kabir Bedi, Asha Parekh | Action | |
| Rani Mera Naam | S. M. Sagar | Ashok Kumar, Vinod Mehra, Vijaya Lalitha, Prem Nath | Drama | |
| Rivaaj | T. Prakash Rao | Sanjeev Kumar, Farida Jalal, Mala Sinha, Shatrugan Sinha | Drama | |
| Roop Tera Mastana | Khalid Akhtar | Jeetendra, Mumtaz, Pran | Romance | |
| Sa-Re-Ga-Ma-Pa | Satyen Bose | Vishal Anand, Nazneen, Nana Palshikar, Ashok Kumar | Drama | |
| Sabse Bada Sukh | Hrishikesh Mukherjee | Vijay Arora, Sanjeev Kumar, Meeta, Utpal Dutt | Drama | |
| Samaanta | Nitin Bose | Dheeraj Kumar, Snehlata | Drama | |
| Samadhi | Prakash Mehra | Dharmendra, Jaya Bachchan, Asha Parekh | Romance | |
| Sazaa | Chand | Kabir Bedi, Rekha, Jeetendra, Ashok Kumar, Yogeeta Bali, Pran | Thriller | |
| Seeta Aur Geeta | Ramesh Sippy | Dharmendra, Sanjeev Kumar, Hema Malini | Romance | |
| Shaadi Ke Baad | L.V. Prasad | Jeetendra, Shatrughan Sinha, Raakhee | Drama | |
| Shararat | Manmohan Desai | Mumtaz, Biswajeet, Shatrughan Sinha | Drama | |
| Shayar-e-Kashmir Mahjoor | Prabhat Mukherjee | Balraj Sahni | Drama | |
| Shehzada | K. Shankar | Rajesh Khanna, Raakhee | Drama | |
| Shor | Manoj Kumar | Manoj Kumar, Nanda, Jaya Bachchan | Drama | |
| Sub Ka Saathi | A. Bhimsingh | Vinod Khanna, Bharthi | Drama | |
| Subah-O-Shaam | Tapi Chanakya | Sanjeev Kumar, Waheeda Rehman | Drama | |
| Sultana Daku | Mohammed Hussain | Helen, Dara Singh | Drama | |
| Tangewala | Naresh Kumar | Mumtaz, Rajendra Kumar, Sujit Kumar | Action | |
| Tanhai | Naresh Kumar | Rehana Sultan | Drama | |
| Trisandhya | Raj Marbros | Baskar Roy Chawdhury, Waheeda Rehman, Latha Menon | Drama | |
| Victoria No. 203 | Brij | Navin Nischol, Saira Banu, Ashok Kumar, Pran | Drama | |
| Wafaa | Ramanna | Raakhee, Nasir Hussain, Sanjay Khan | Drama | |
| Yaar Mera | Atma Ram | Jeetendra, Rakhee Gulzar | Drama | |
| Yeh Gulistan Hamara | Atma Ra | Dev Anand, Sharmila Tagore, Pran | Drama | |
| Zameen Aasman | A. Veerappan | Sunil Dutt, Yogeeta Bali | Action | |
| Zaroorat | B. R. Ishara | Reena Roy, Danny Denzongpa | Drama | |
| Zindagi Zindagi | Tapan Sinha | Deb Mukherjee, Waheeda Rehman, Farida Jalal, Ashok Kumar | Romance | |

== See also ==
- List of Hindi films of 1971
- List of Hindi films of 1973
