= Jagdish Raj =

Indian actor (1928–2013)

- Born: Jagdish Raj Khurana; 1928; Sargodha, Punjab, British India
- Died: 28 July 2013 (aged 84–85); Mumbai, Maharashtra, India
- Occupation: Actor
- Years active: 1954-2004
- Children: 3, including Anita Raj

Jagdish Raj Khurana (1928 – 28 July 2013) was a Bollywood actor who is noted for playing the role of a police inspector in 144 films, per the Limca Book of Records.

== Life and career ==
He was born in 1928 in the town of Sargodha, British India, which is now in Pakistan. His daughter Anita Raj is also a Bollywood actress. Actress Malvika Raaj is his grand-daughter.

Some of his popular movies include Deewar, Don, Shakti, Mazdoor, Imaan Dharam, Gopichand Jasoos, Silsila, Aaina and Besharam. He also played Aditya Pancholi's father in Naamcheen (1991). Although Raj occasionally played a villain and a couple of times played a judge, he was best known for being cast a record 144 times as a police officer. After Shafi Inamdar, he holds the Limca Book of Records record for Most memorable policeman ever.

== Death ==
Raj died on 28 July 2013 at his Juhu residence following a respiratory ailment. He was 85 years old. He has two daughters, Anita Raj and Roopa Malhotra and a son named Bobby.

== Selected filmography ==
- Ek Hi Raasta (1939)
- Seema (1955) - Doctor
- Funtoosh (1956)
- CID (1956) - Inspector Jagdish
- 12 O'Clock (1958) - Police Inspector Chauhan
- Madhumati (1958) - Police Captain (uncredited)
- Dhool Ka Phool (1959) - Prosecuting Attorney
- Shararat (1959)
- Kangan (1959) - Captain
- Kanoon (1960) - Sub-Inspector Das
- Honeymoon (1960)
- Bahadur Lutera (1960)
- Kala Bazar (1960)
- Bombai Ka Babu (1960) - Bali
- Modern Girl (1961) - Advocate
- Dharmputra (1961)
- Teen Ustad (1961)
- Roop Ki Rani Choron Ka Raja (1961) - Jeweller
- Pyaar Ka Saagar (1961) - Eye Surgeon Dr. Cooper
- Passport (1961) - Police Inspector
- Hum Dono (1961) - Jagdish
- Tarzan Goes to India (1962) - Raj
- Rocket Girl (1962)
- Ek Mahal Ho Sapno Ka (1962) - Inspector Jagdish
- Bombay Ka Chor (1962) - Police Inspector
- Ankh Micholi (1962) - Inspector Jagdish
- Nine Hours to Rama (1963) - Detective
- Pyar Ka Bandhan (1963) - Jaggu
- Kinare Kinare (1963) - Doctor (uncredited)
- Ek Dil Sao Afsane (1963) - Sunita's Boss
- Waqt (1965) - Police Inspector
- Raaka (1965)
- Bhoot Bungla (1965) - Police Inspector Sawant
- Budtameez (1966) - Colonel Jung Bahadur
- Hamraaz (1967) - Police Inspector Mhatre
- Jewel Thief (1967) - Jewel Thief's associate
- Jaal (1967)
- Baazi (1968) - Blackmailer
- Sunghursh (1968) - Raja Saheb
- Neel Kamal (1968)
- Duniya (1968) - Madan's associate
- Parivar (1968) - Meena's Father
- Jhuk Gaya Aasman (1968) - Police Inspector
- Farishta (1968)
- Abhilasha (1968) - Arun's Commanding Officer
- Aanchal Ke Phool (1968) - Doctor at Government Hospital
- The Killers (1969)
- Aadmi Aur Insaan (1969) - Balwa (drunkard)
- Ittefaq (1969) - Inspector Khan
- Tumse Achha Kaun Hai (1969) - Police Inspector
- Nanak Naam Jahaz Hai (1969) - Thanedaar
- Kismat (1969) - Undercover Police Inspector
- Jyoti (1969) - Dr. Verma
- Ilzam (1970) - Jaggu
- Sachaa Jhutha (1970) - Inspector. Jagdish
- Johny Mera Naam (1970) - Police Inspector
- The Evil Within (1970) - Yalid
- Safar (1970) - Police Inspector
- Pavitra Paapi (1970) - Police Inspector of Hoshiarpur (uncredited)
- Ishq Par Zor Nahin (1970) - Rai
- Bhai-Bhai (1970) - Diamond Auctioner
- Mehboob Ki Mehndi (1971) - Nisar Ahmed / Usman
- Upaasna (1971) - Police Inspector Verma
- Elaan (1971) - Police Inspector
- Patanga (1971) - Manoharlal
- Memsaab (1971) - His Highness
- Man Mandir (1971) - Kishan
- Hum Tum Aur Woh (1971) - Inspector Surendra Mohan Khurana
- Hulchul (1971)
- Gambler (1971) - Inspector Ranade
- Sanjog (1972) - Jagdish (Guest Appearance)
- Dastaan (1972) - Mr. Shetty
- Apradh (1972) - Customs Officer
- Jawani Diwani (1972) - Mr. Sharma
- Victoria No. 203 (1972) - Ranjeet (uncredited)
- Jangal Mein Mangal (1972) - Senior Police Inspector
- Yaar Mera (1972) - Jailor
- Tanhai (1972) - Sethji / The Gambler
- Tangewala (1972) - Police Inspector
- Mangetar (1972)
- Do Chor (1972) - Police Inspector
- Babul Ki Galiyan (1972) - Police Inspector
- Dhund (1973) - Inspector Bakshi
- Daag (1973) - Ram Singh (driver) (uncredited)
- Kuchhe Dhaage (1973) - Amrutlal
- Dhamkee (1973)
- Jheel Ke Us Paar (1973) - Police Inspector Saxena (uncredited)
- Bobby (1973) - Police Inspector
- Joshila (1973)
- Teen Chor (1973)
- Samjhauta (1973) - Police Inspector
- Jalte Badan (1973) - Dr. Hussain
- Hum Sab Chor Hain (1973) - Police Inspector Jagdish
- Ghulam Begam Badshah (1973) - Card Player
- Chalaak (1973) - Police Inspector
- Blackmail (1973) - Mr. Das
- Apradhi (1974) - Mahant Badriprasad
- Dost (1974) - Police Inspector who paid visit to Mr. Gupta after Shyamal's death (uncredited)
- Paap Aur Punya (1974) - Police Inspector
- Chor Chor (1974) - Inspector
- Anjaan Raahen (1974) - House Master
- International Crook (1974) - Inspector Mario
- Roti (1974) - Police Inspector
- Benaam (1974) - Mr. Desai
- Majboor (1974) - Police Inspector Kulkarni
- Zehreela Insaan (1974) - Bidre
- Jeevan Rekha (1974)
- Insaaniyat (1974) - Police Inspector Ramesh
- Har Har Mahadev (1974) - Tarkasur
- Duniya Ka Mela (1974) - Sethji / Man who attempts raping Shyama
- Chhote Sarkar (1974) - Jaggu
- Chattan Singh (1974) - Thanedar
- 36 Ghante (1974) - Police Inspector S.P. Mathur
- Veeru Ustaad (1975)
- Warrant (1975)
- Deewaar (1975) - Jaggi
- Zorro (1975) - Hariprasad
- Zameer (1975) - Sher Singh
- Dharmatma (1975) - Dr. Jagdish
- Ek Mahal Ho Sapno Ka (1975) - Pal
- Dharam Karam (1975) - Inspector Nath
- Saazish (1975) - Hunsui's doctor
- Mutthi Bhar Chawal (1975)
- Mere Sajna (1975)
- Khel Khel Mein (1975) - Inspector (uncredited)
- Do Jasoos (1975) - Police Inspector Solanki (uncredited)
- Dharam Jeet (1975) - Inspector
- Dafaa 302 (1975) - Satish
- Jaggu (1975)
- Sawa Lakh Se Ek Ladaun (1976) - Subedar Ali Shah
- Khaan Dost (1976) - Mohan
- Jaaneman (1976) - Taxi driver
- Fakira (1976) - Roshan
- Bajrangbali (1976)
- Laila Majnu (1976)
- Do Anjaane (1976) - Doctor
- Mazdoor Zindabaad (1976) - Inspector (uncredited)
- Maha Chor (1976) - Inspector Jagdish Raj
- Chalte Chalte (1976) - Inspector
- Bhoola Bhatka (1976) - Senior Police Inspector
- Immaan Dharam (1977) - Police Inspector
- Dream Girl (1977)
- Aaina (1977) - Managing Director (as Jagdishraj)
- Karm (1977) - Khanna
- Doosara Aadmi (1977) - Police Inspector
- Tinku (1977) - Police Inspector
- Ram Bharose (1977)
- Paradh (1977)
- Paapi (1977) - Inspector Bhaskar
- Mama Bhanja (1977) - Police Inspector
- Chaalu Mera Naam (1977) - Micheal
- Chingari (1977)
- Tyaag Patra (1978)
- Rahu Ketu (1978) - Inspector Thakur
- Vishwanath (1978) - Francis
- Tumhari Kasam (1978) - Police Inspector (Uncredited)
- Besharam (1978) - Pandey
- Trishul (1978) - Police Inspector who arrested Balwant (uncredited)
- Don (1978) - Fake Police Officer
- Azaad (1978) - Police Inspector Sharma
- Phandebaaz (1978) - Police Inspector
- Main Tulsi Tere Aangan Ki (1978) - Agarwal
- Dil Aur Deewar (1978)
- Sone Ka Dil Lohe Ke Haath (1978) - Police Inspector
- Ram Kasam (1978)
- Parmatma (1978) - Inspector
- Karmayogi (1978)
- Kaala Aadmi (1978)
- Chor Ho To Aisa (1978) - Police Inspector
- Anjaam (1978) - D.S.P.
- Bhayaanak (1979) - Sadhu Singh
- Dil Kaa Heera (1979) - Pilot
- The Great Gambler (1979) - Nath
- Magroor (1979) - Police Officer
- Duniya Meri Jeb Mein (1979) - Supervisor
- Kaala Patthar (1979) - Police Inspector
- Bin Phere Hum Tere (1979) - Ganesh
- Shuhaag (1979) - Police Inspector-Khan
- Dhan Daulat (1980) - Police Inspector
- Do Aur Do Paanch (1980) - Security guard (one in darker suit)
- Khwab (1980) - Inspector Shinde
- The Burning Train (1980) - Dango, Railway Engine Motorman
- Chambal Ki Kasam (1980) - Zalim Singh's Gangman
- Dostana (1980) - Driver (Daaga's man)
- Insaf Ka Tarazu (1980) - Inspector
- Zakhmon Ke Nishan (1980)
- Yari Dushmani (1980) - Jailer
- Pyaara Dushman (1980)
- Patita (1980)
- Bandish (1980)
- Paanch Qaidi (1981) - Thanedaar
- Ehsaan Aap Ka (1981) - Dr. Saxena
- Krodhi (1981) - Police Inspector
- Nakhuda (1981) - Police Inspector
- Agnee Pareeksha (1981) - Police Inspector
- Ladies Tailor (1981) - Police Inspector
- Khoon Aur Paani (1981) - Johnny
- Naseeb (1981) - Jaggi, the band musician
- Silsila (1981)
- Ek Hi Bhool (1981) - Ram's Firm Boss (Guest Appearance)
- Shakka (1981) - Raghu
- Fiffty Fiffty (1981) - Chandpur's Trustee
- Gehra Zakhm (1981) - Police Inspector (uncredited)
- Sheetla Mata (1981) - Sardar Phoolan
- Sansani: The Sensation (1981) - Mr. Mathur
- Raaz (1981) - Lawyer
- Professor Pyarelal (1981)
- Do Dishayen (1982) - Doctor 2
- Aamne Samne (1982)
- Teesri Aankh (1982) - Police Inspector
- Desh Premee (1982) - Major B.K. Verma
- Sawaal (1982) - Inspector Jagdish
- Dil-E-Nadaan (1982)
- Shakti (1982)
- Deedar-E-Yaar (1982)
- Raakh Aur Chingari (1982) - Manohar
- Jeeo Aur Jeene Do (1982)
- Dulha Bikta Hai (1982) - Advocate Defence Lawyer
- Do Ustad (1982)
- Gopichand Jasoos (1982) - Verma
- Hum Se Na Jeeta Koi (1983) - Police Chief
- Taqdeer (1983) - Mr. Rai
- Kaun? Kaisey? (1983) - Senior Police
- Jeet Hamaari (1983) - Police Com. Saxena
- Jaane Jaan (1983) - Police inspector
- Naukar Biwi Ka (1983) - Police Inspector
- Mazdoor (1983) - Tiwari, Bank Manager
- Rishta Kagaz Ka (1983) - Aarti's dad
- Kaise Kaise Log (1983)
- Daulat Ke Dushman (1983) - Inspector Gopal
- Bindiya Chamkegi (1984) - Jeevan
- Inquilaab (1984) - I.G..P. Shamsher Singh - Delhi
- Boxer (1984) - Man Whose Watch Gets Stolen
- Hum Hain Lajawab (1984) - Khan Saab
- Raj Tilak (1984) - King's Assailant
- Laila (1984) - Thakur (Sunaina's Father)
- Jeene Nahin Doonga (1984) - Jailor
- Kasam Paida Karne Wale Ki (1984) - Prosecuting Attorney
- The Gold Medal (1984) - Inspector Choudhary
- Ram Tere Kitne Nam (1985) - Jailor
- Aandhi-Toofan (1985) - I.G.P.
- Arjun (1985) - Senior Police Officer
- Yudh (1985) - Bhatnagar (Police Training Instructor, Special Appearances)
- Sitamgar (1985) - Michael - bartender
- Mehak (1985)
- Ram Teri Ganga Maili (1985) - Police Inspector
- Geraftaar (1985) - Inspector Samant
- Jaan Ki Baazi (1985) - Commissioner
- Zulm Ka Badla (1985) - Inspector / D.I.G. Verma
- Salma (1985) - Doctor who checked Salma's throat
- Phaansi Ke Baad (1985) - Inspector Bhagwat
- Karishma Kudrat Kaa (1985) - Inspector General of Police
- Bond 303 (1985) - Police inspector
- Sasti Dulhan Mahenga Doolha (1986) - Mafatlal
- Locket (1986)
- Teesra Kinara (1986)
- Mera Haque (1986) - Police Inspector
- Chhota Aadmi (1986)
- Bhai Ka Dushman Bhai (1986)
- Loha (1987) - Police Commissioner
- Aag Hi Aag (1987) - Judge
- Mera Karam Mera Dharam (1987) - Police Inspector
- Vishaal (1987) - Police Inspector
- Khazana (1987) - Police Inspector
- Inaam Dus Hazaar (1987) - Auctioneer
- Sagar Sangam (1988) - S.P (Superident of Police)
- Soorma Bhopali (1988)
- Janam Janam (1988) - Sunil's Father
- Do Waqt Ki Roti (1988) - Supdt. of Police
- Meri Zabaan (1989)
- Asmaan Se Ooncha (1989)
- Nafrat Ki Aandhi (1989) - Police Commissioner
- Do Yaar (1989)
- Na-Insaafi (1989) - Police Commissioner
- Aakhri Ghulam (1989) - Jailor
- Oonch Neech Beech (1989) - Police Inspector
- Toofan (1989) - IGP (uncredited)
- Paap Ka Ant (1989) - Police Commissioner
- Jeene Do (1990) - Sujata's dad
- Baaghi (1990) - Police Commissioner (uncredited)
- Roti Ki Keemat (1990) - Chief Commissioner of Police
- Jawani Zindabad (1990) - Police Inspector (uncredited)
- Aag Ka Gola (1990) - Police Commissioner
- Begunaah (1991) - Police Inspector
- Vishnu-Devaa (1991) - Police Commissioner
- Yodha (1991) - Police Inspector Shinde
- Paap Ki Aandhi (1991) - Senior Police Officer
- Kasam Kali Ki (1991) - Police Commissioner
- Love (1991)
- Phool Bane Angaray (1991) - Commissioner Pandey
- Naamcheen (1991) - Rajan's father
- Khule-Aam (1992)
- Bol Radha Bol (1992) - Police Commissioner
- Humshakal (1992) - Jail Warden
- Bekhudi (1992)
- Deedar (1992) - Air Force Officer Sabharwal
- Sone Ki Zanjeer (1992) - Doctor
- Apradhi (1992) - The Judge
- Naseebwaala (1992)
- Lambu Dada (1992) - Senior Police Inspector (uncredited)
- Insaniyat Ke Devta (1993) - The Judge
- Badi Bahen (1993) - Dr. Srivastav
- Kundan (1993) - Police Chief
- Dil Tera Aashiq (1993) - Police Inspector (uncredited)
- Baarish (1993)
- Veerta (1993) - Amar's Advisor
- Mohabbat Ki Arzoo (1994) - Police Commissioner
- Vaade Iraade (1994) - Chunnibai (Film Producer)
- Meri Biwi Ka Jawab Nahin (1994) - DIG
- Zakhmi Sipahi (1995) - Inspector
- Bewafa Sanam (1995) - Police Commissioner
- Jagannath (1996) - Mohan Sinha
- Muqadama (1996) - Jailer
- Dushman Duniya Ka (1996) - Police Inspector
- Aakhri Sanghursh (1997)
- Kasam (2001) - Senior Police Officer
