= Anbu Magan =

1961 film

- Theatrical release poster
- Directed by: T. Prakash Rao
- Written by: Murasoli Maran
- Produced by: T. V. S. Raju
- Starring: A. Nageswara Rao; Savithri; K. A. Thangavelu; M. N. Rajam
- Cinematography: Kamal Ghosh
- Edited by: N. M. Shankar
- Music by: T. Chalapathi Rao
- Production company: Pragathi Art Productions
- Release date: 27 January 1961
- Running time: 2:48 (15120 ft.)
- Country: India
- Language: Tamil

Anbu Magan (transl. Beloved Son) is a 1961 Indian Tamil-language film directed by T. Prakash Rao. The film stars A. Nageswara Rao and Savitri. It was released on 27 January 1961. It is a remake of the Telugu film Maa Babu, which in turn is a remake of Hindi film Chirag Kahan Roshni Kahan (1959).

== Cast ==
The list is adapted from the film's Song book.

Male cast

- A. Nageswara Rao
- K. A. Thangavelu
- S. V. Sahasranamam
- K. Sarangapani
- M. N. Krishnan
- Karikol Raj

Female cast

- Savithri
- M. N. Rajam
- P. Kannamba
- M. Saroja
- Honey Irani

Guest artistes

- V. Nagayya
- D. Balasubramaniam
- A. Karunanidhi

== Production ==
The film was produced by T. V. S. Raju under the banner Pragathi Art Productions and was directed by T. Prakash Rao. Murasoli Maran wrote the screenplay and dialogues. Kamal Ghosh was in charge of cinematography while the editing was done by N. M. Shankar. Audiography was done by A. Krishnan. Kaladhar was the Art Director. The film was shot and processed at Vijaya Vauhini Studios.

== Soundtrack ==
Music was composed by T. Chalapathi Rao. The songs My Dear Lady Pothunga and Vanna Mayil Vel Murugan did not take place in the film and were not listed in the film's song book either.

| Song | Singer/s | Lyricist | Length |
|---|---|---|---|
| "Kodukka Therindha Maname Unakku" | P. B. Srinivas | Kannadasan | |
| "Annam Pole Unnai Than Arugil Vaithaan" | P. Susheela | Kannadasan | 03:55 |
| "Annam Pole Unnai" (another version) | P. Susheela | Kannadasan | 01:55 |
| "Paal Koduththa Thanangal Sollum" | P. Leela | Kannadasan | |
| "Oru Ooril Oru Rajah...Chal Chalonnu Savaari Vittar" | P. Susheela | Udumalai Narayana Kavi | 05:35 |
| "O! .. Maappillai Machaan" | Sirkazhi Govindarajan & S. Janaki | A. S. Rajagopal | 06:12 |
| "Malar .. Gum Gum Manam Veesum" | K. Jamuna Rani | Subbu Arumugam | |
| "My Dear Lady Pothunga" | Thiruchi Loganathan | | 03:22 |
