= Do Jasoos =

- Poster
- Directed by: Naresh Kumar
- Written by: K. A. Narayan (Story); Irshad (Dialogue)
- Produced by: Naresh Kumar
- Starring: Raj Kapoor; Rajendra Kumar
- Cinematography: Babu Bhai Udeshi
- Edited by: Govind Dalwadi
- Music by: Ravindra Jain
- Release date: 6 June 1975
- Country: India
- Language: Hindi

Do Jasoos (lit. 'Two detectives') is a 1975 Hindi comedy drama film produced and directed by Naresh Kumar. Raj Kapoor, Rajendra Kumar started in the title roles, along with Prem Chopra, Sujit Kumar, Farida Jalal, Aruna Irani among others. The music is by Ravindra Jain.

== Plot ==
Dharamchand and Karamchand are two detectives who are sunk in debts due to lack of work. One day they get a call from a rich businessman, who hires them for finding his lost daughter, Hema. However, he breaks his glasses and provides them with the photograph of his daughter's friend, Pinky.

Pinky lives with her widowed mother and is in love with Ashok, the son of a journalist, who had been instrumental in the arrest of a smuggler, Prem Chopra. Prem's father had wronged Pinky's father in the past and in remorse, named Pinky his heir before his death. Prem comes out of jail and murders Ashok's father. Pinky becomes eye-witness to the murder and tries to flee from Prem, who on one hand wants to marry her for his father's property and on the other hand, wants to kill her. Dharamchand and Karamchand save Pinky a number of times, thinking her to be Hema. However, on learning the truth, they decide to protect Pinky from the clutches of Prem's gang. In the end, they are successful in busting the entire smuggling racket and also two other rackets of fake currency and prostitution.

== Cast ==
- Raj Kapoor as Dharamchand
- Rajendra Kumar as Karamchand
- Shailendra Singh as Ashok Sinha
- Bhavna Bhatt as Pinky Verma
- Prem Chopra as Prem Chopra
- Kamal Kapoor as Motilal Sippy
- Jagdish Raj as Police Inspector
- Farida Jalal as Hema
- Aruna Irani as Chhamia
- Manmohan Krishna as Journalist V.N. Sinha
- Sujit Kumar as G.L. Sippy
- Dulari as Sarita Devi Verma
- Asit Sen as Seth Nihalchand Khushalchand
- Rammohan Sharma as Ram Singh
- Randhir as John Uncle
- Gurcharan Pohli as Prem’s associate
- Bachchan Singh as Prem’s associate
- Raj Kishore as Prem's associate
- Appi Umrani as Moti's associate
- Ram Avtar as Johnson
- Sunder as Thomson
- Moolchand as dancer in the New Year party

== Music ==
Lyrics are written by Hasrat Jaipuri and Ravindra Jain

1. "Dariya Cha Raaja Deva" – Lata Mangeshkar, Shailendra Singh part of this song is copied from Woyaya by Ghanaian Afro-pop band Osibisa released in 1971
2. "Happy New Year To You" – Shailendra Singh
3. "Main Bijli Hoon Titli Hoon" – Lata Mangeshkar, Shailendra Singh
4. "Allaah Meri Tauba" – Asha Bhosle
5. "Do Jasoos Kare" – Mohammed Rafi, Mukesh
6. "Saal Mubaarak Saaheb Ji" – Mohammed Rafi, Mukesh
7. "Chadh Gayi Chadh Gayi" – Mohammed Rafi, Mukesh, [Inderjeet singh Tulsi]
