= The Corsican Brothers =

1844 novella by Alexandre Dumas

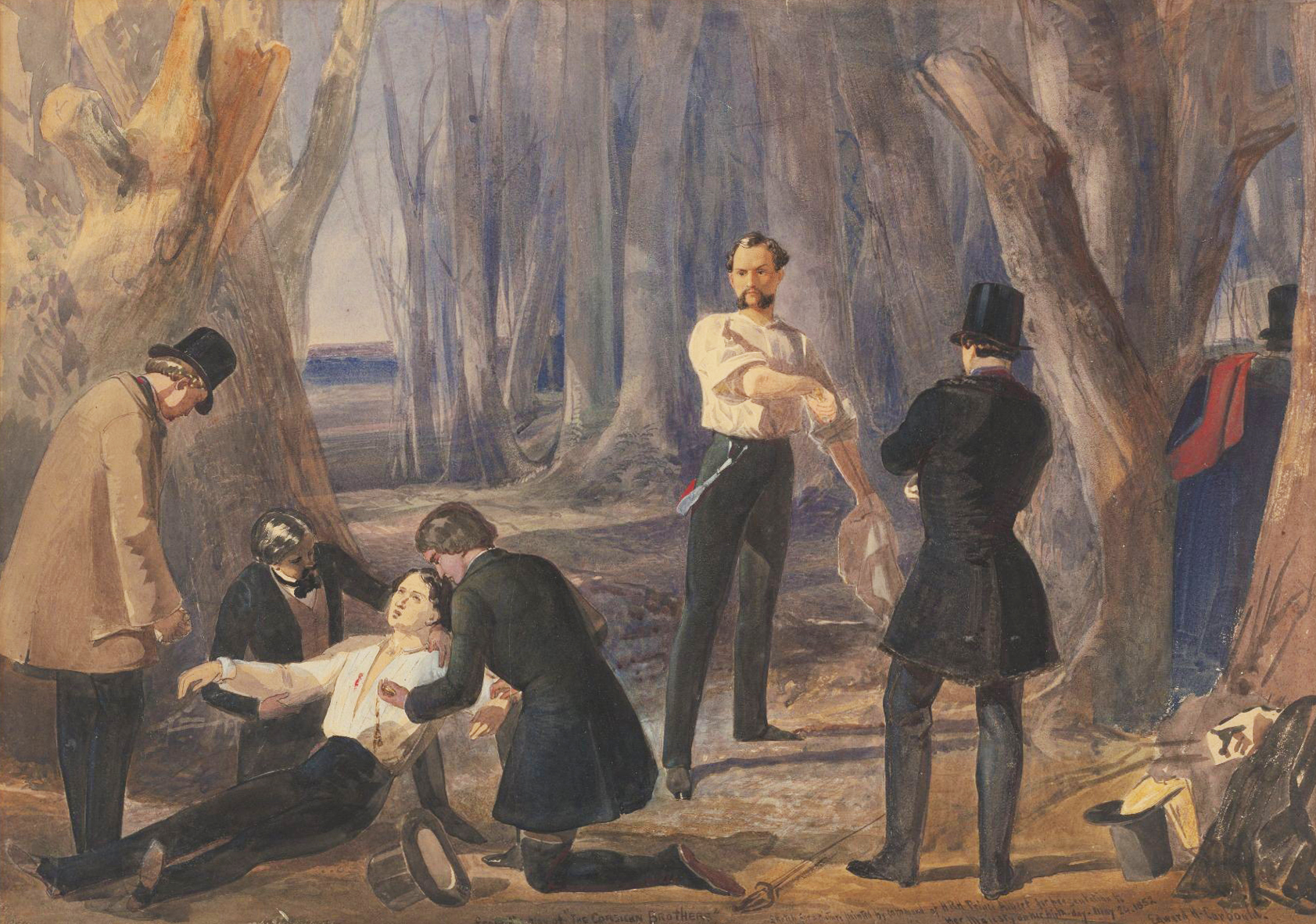
- Painting by Edward Henry Corbould depicting a scene from The Corsican Brothers in an 1852 London adaptation
- Author: Alexandre Dumas, père
- Publication date: 1844

The Corsican Brothers (French: Les Frères corses) is a novella by Alexandre Dumas, first published in 1844. It is the story of two conjoined brothers who, although separated at birth, can still feel each other's physical distress. It has been adapted many times on the stage and in film.

== Plot ==
In March 1841, the narrator travels to Corsica and stays at the home of the widow Savilia de Franchi, who lives near Olmeto and Sollacaro. She is the mother of formerly conjoined twins Louis and Lucien. Louis is a lawyer in Paris, while Lucien clings to his Corsican roots and stays at his mother's home.

The brothers were separated at birth by a doctor with his scalpel, but Louis and Lucien can feel each other's emotions, even at a distance. Lucien explains he has a mission to undertake, with reluctance. He has to mediate a vendetta between the Orlandi and Colona families and invites the narrator to accompany him and meet the head of the Orlandi family.

== Adaptations ==
=== Theatre ===
The play The Corsican Brothers, by Dion Boucicault, based on the story, premiered in 1852.

=== Film ===
- The Corsican Brothers (1898), directed by film pioneer and inventor George Albert Smith
- The Corsican Brothers (1902), directed by Dicky Winslow
- The Corsican Brothers (1912), featuring George Lessey
- The Corsican Brothers (1915), starring King Baggot in the dual title roles, directed by George Lessey
- The Corsican Brothers Up To Date (1915), directed by Charles Hutchison
- The Corsican Brothers (1917), directed by André Antoine
- The Corsican Brothers (1920), directed by Louis J. Gasnier
- The Corsican Brothers (1941), starring Douglas Fairbanks, Jr.
- Apoorva Sagodharargal (1949), a Tamil film starring M. K. Radha and P. Bhanumathi, directed by Acharya
- The Bandits of Corsica (1953), starring Richard Greene in the dual title roles, directed by Ray Nazarro
- The Corsican Brothers, (1955), an Argentine film, directed by Leo Fleider
- The Corsican Brothers (1961), a French-Italian production starring Geoffrey Horne
- Aggi Pidugu (1964), a Telugu film directed by B. Vittalacharya, starring N. T. Rama Rao, Krishna Kumari and Rajasri
- Aathma Pooja (1970), a Sinhala (Sri Lankan) film directed by M. Masthaan, starring Gamini Fonseka
- Start the Revolution Without Me (1970), a parody starring Gene Wilder and Donald Sutherland as two sets of identical twins, one of each pair switched at birth
- Neerum Neruppum (1971), a Tamil film starring M. G. Ramachandran and Jayalalithaa
- Gora Aur Kala (1972), a Hindi film starring Rajendra Kumar, Hema Malini, Rekha
- Cheech and Chong's The Corsican Brothers (1984), a parody
- The Corsican Brothers (1985), a Hallmark Hall of Fame movie featuring Trevor Eve
- Twin Dragons (1992), a movie featuring Jackie Chan

== In popular culture ==
- G.I. Joe: A Real American Hero characters Tomax and Xamot are twin brothers described as having "Corsican Syndrome" in that they share a psychic link and can feel each other's pain.
- In the U.S. television science fiction series Warehouse 13, "The Corsican Brothers' Vest" is an artifact which causes who ever hurts the wearer to feel the pain (and get wounded) instead of him. In episode 12 of season 2 H. G. Wells wears the vest and, when being shot, the shooter gets the bullet instead.
- In Dear Bill, the parody of British political life during the Thatcher era, Denis Thatcher routinely refers to the government's PR consultants Saatchi and Saatchi as "The Corsican Brothers".
- In 1970 US television, a comedic parody aired on the television sitcom Bewitched. In the episode titled "The Corsican Cousins", Samantha's mother, Endora, places a spell on Samantha so she will feel and act out everything her cousin Serena does.
- In the 1981 novel The Xanadu Talisman by Peter O'Donnell, Georges and Bernard Martel are compared to the Corsican Brothers because "one was good and one was bad".
- Volume 14 chapter 01 of the manga series Black Jack involves the title character treating twin brothers who are able to feel each other's pain, which their guardian compares to the Corsican Brothers.
- In the Men in Black: The Series episode "The Psychic Link Syndrome," Agent J compares Agent K to the Corsican Brothers when an alien named Forbus forms a psychic bond with K, causing the two to experience one another's sensations and emotions.
- Cheech & Chong's The Corsican Brothers is a 1984 American film based on Dumas’ novella.
