= Kamal Kapoor =

Indian actor and producer (1920–2010)

- Born: Kamal Kishore Kapoor; 22 February 1920; Peshawar, North-West Frontier Province, British India (Present-day Khyber Pakhtunkhwa, Pakistan)
- Died: 2 August 2010 (aged 90); Mumbai, Maharashtra, India
- Occupation: Actor. director. producer
- Years active: 1946–1997
- Notable work: Don (1978)
- Spouse: Suman Devi (m. 1945)
- Children: 5, including Kapil Kapoor
- Relatives: Ravindra Kapoor (brother); Prithviraj Kapoor (first-cousin); Ramesh Behl (son-in-law); Goldie Behl (grandson)
- Family: Kapoor family Behl family

Kamal Kishore Kapoor (22 February 1920 – 2 August 2010), better known as Kamal Kapoor, was an Indian actor and producer who acted in Hindi, Punjabi, Marathi, Gujarati, Bengali and Haryanvi films.

== Early and personal life ==
Kamal Kishore Kapoor was born on 22 February 1920 in Peshawar, North-West Frontier Province, British India. Kapoor completed his studies in Lahore's DAV college. He was cousin of Prithviraj Kapoor (their mothers were sisters) and maternal grandfather of Goldie Behl.

He had five children - three sons and two daughters. His younger daughter is the wife of film-maker Ramesh Behl and mother of Goldie Behl.

== Career ==
He started his career working as a protagonist through the 1940s-50s. His first film was Door Chalen, which was released in 1946. He started playing a villain in the 1960s-70s. Some of his popular roles are those of the father of Raj Kapoor in Aag and Narang in Don.

== Filmography ==
=== Hindi ===
Year	Film	Role	Notes
1946	Door Chalen		First release
1947	Dak Bangla		First signed film
1947	Hatimtai		
1948	Aag	Kewal Khanna's father	
1948	Pardesi Mehman		
1951	Kashmir		Also Co-producer
1951	Sabz Bag		
1951	Shayun		
1952	Insaan		
1952	Jaggu		
1954	Ameer		
1954	Ehsan		
1954	Khaiber		Also Producer
1955	Jalti Nishani		
1955	Miss Coca Cola		
1956	Dwarikadheesh		
1956	Insaaf		
1957	Khuda Ka Banda		
1957	Laxmi		
1958	Aakhri Dao	Pyare Lal Gupta	
1958	Mujrim	Kumar	
1958	Phir Subha Hogi	Sohni's molester	
1958	Circus Sundari		
1959	Bhakt Pralhad		
1959	Commander		
1959	Hazar Pariyan		
1960	Lal Quila		
1961	Reshmi Rumal	Deepak	
1962	Ek Musafir Ek Hasina	Ranjeet	
1964	Tarzan Aur Captain Kishore		
1965	Do Dil	Bijli's father	
1965	Jab Jab Phool Khile	Chunni Lal Khanna	
1965	Johar-Mehmood in Goa	Police Supdt Alburqueue	
1965	Shaheed	Public Prosecutor	
1966	Gaban	Advocate	
1966	Johar In Kashmir		
1966	Netaji Subhash Chandra Bose		
1967	Aamne Samne		
1967	Diwana	Ramdas / Sir Mayadas	
1967	Mera Bhai Mera Dushman	Balam	
1967	Raaz	Sunil's friend	
1967	Taqdeer	Vijay	
1968	Raja Aur Runk	Vikram	
1969	Bandhan	Judge	
1969	Mera Dost		
1969	Pyasi Sham		
1969	Raja Saab	Poonam's uncle	
1969	Shatranj		
1970	Dastak	Brijmohan	
1970	Mastana	Jaggu's boss	
1970	Sachaa Jhutha	Police Commissioner	
1970	Veer Amarsingh Rathod		
1971	Haseenon Ka Devta	Tony	
1971	Johar Mehmood in Hong Kong	Boss	
1971	Mehboob Ki Mehndi	Lawyer, Public Prosecutor	
1972	Baazigar		
1972	Gora Aur Kala	Dilawar Singh	
1972	Kanch Aur Heera		
1972	Lalkar		
1972	Pakeezah	Zafar Ali Khan	
1972	Seeta Aur Geeta	Ravi's father	
1973	Black Mail	Dr. J. K. Shetty	
1973	Chhalia		
1973	Ek Mutthi Aasmaan		
1973	Hanste Zakhm	Daulat Singh	
1973	Jugnu	Police Inspector	
1973	Mera Desh Mera Dharam	Army General	
1973	Prabhaat		
1973	Wohi Raat Wohi Awaaz		
1974	5 Rifles	Police Commissioner	
1974	Chor Machaye Shor	Jagdish	
1974	Dil Diwana	Kapoor	
1974	Do Number Ke Amir		
1974	Insaaniyat	Judge	
1974	Khote Sikkay	Police Commissioner	
1975	Deewar	Factory Owner	
1975	Do Jasoos	Motilal	
1975	Khel Khel Mein	Ajay's father	
1975	Sandhya		
1975	Shree Satyanarayan Ki Maha Pooja		
1975	Veeru Ustaad		
1975	Zakhmee	Chief	
1976	Bhala Manus	Mahendra	
1976	Bundal Baaz	Sukhi Lala	
1976	Laila Majnu	Amari	
1976	Udhar Ka Sindur	Superintendent of Police	
1977	Aafat	Police Commissioner	
1977	Amar Akbar Anthony	Amar Khanna's foster father	
1977	Daku Aur Mahatma		
1977	Hum Kisise Kum Naheen	Kishorilal	
1977	Jay Vejay	Maan Singh	
1977	Paapi		
1977	Tyaag	Sunita's father	
1978	Don	Narang	
1978	Ghata	Kuldeep Pandey	
1978	Sone Ka Dil Lohe Ke Haath	Deena Nath Mathur	
1979	Bin Phere Hum Tere	Jagmohan	
1979	Gawaah		
1980	Chaal Baaz		
1980	Chambal Ki Rani		
1980	Chunaoti	Yashpal Singh	
1980	Dadon Ka Dada		
1980	Gunehgaar		
1980	Katil Kaun		
1980	Lahu Pukarega		
1981	Sangdill		
1982	Amne Samne	Supremo	Dubbed and released in Bengali as Aarale Aabdaale.
1982	Dulha Bikta Hai	Champaklal	
1982	Jaanwar		
1982	Kachche Heere	Kamal Singh	
1982	Namak Halaal	Raja Sahib	
1982	Sanam Teri Kasam		
1982	Sawaal		
1982	Sugandh		
1982	Taaqat	Mahendra Pratap	
1983	Humse Hai Zamana	Thakur	
1983	Nastik	Ghanshyamdas	
1984	Hum Hain Lajawab	Karan Kumar Singh	
1984	Jagir	Shoor Veer Singh	Dubbed and released in Bengali as Teen Murti.
1984	Karishmaa	Singh	
1985	Jaago		
1985	Mard	General Dyer	
1985	Mehak		
1985	Meri Jung	Dhaaga	
1985	Ram Tere Kitne Nam		
1985	Ramkali		
1985	Yeh Kaisa Karz		
1986	Allah Rakha	Khanna	
1986	Haathon Ki Lakeeren	Lalit Mohan Singh's father	
1986	Jwala		
1986	Nain Mile Chain Kahan		
1986	Palay Khan	Military Court Judge	
1986	Waapsi		
1987	Deewana Tere Naam Ka	Thakur	
1987	Hiraasat	Tom	
1987	Naam O Nishan	Police Commissioner	
1988	Do Waqt Ki Roti	Bhairav Singh	
1989	Daata	Panna	
1989	Do Qaidi	Police Commissioner	
1989	Dost Garibon Ka		
1989	Mahal		
1989	Toofan	Sharma	
1990	Aulaad Ki Khatir		
1990	Chor Pe Mor	Hardayal	
1990	Doodh Ka Karz		
1991	Aakhri Cheekh	Pathri Baba	
1991	Indrajeet	Principal	
1993	Zakhmi Rooh	Father of Reema and Seema	
1997	Aakhri Sanghursh	Khanna	
2013	Love In Bombay		Delayed posthomous release (completed in 1971)

=== Punjabi ===
Year	Film	Role	Notes
1950	Phumman		
1969	Dupatta		
1975	Daku Shamsher Singh		

=== Bengali ===
Year	Film	Role	Notes
1982	Aarale Aabdaale	Supremo	Dubbed version of the Hindi film Amne Samne.
1984	Teen Murti	Shoor Veer Singh	Dubbed version of the Hindi film Jagir.

=== Marathi ===
Year	Film	Role	Notes
1989	Kala Nakalat		
1991	Upkar Dudhache		

=== Gujarati ===
Year	Film	Role	Notes
1975	Veer Champaraj Walo		

=== Haryanvi ===
Year	Film	Role	Notes
1974	Chaudhary Harphul Singh		
