= Jurm Aur Sazaa =

- Directed by: Nisar Ahmad Ansari
- Written by: Dhruva Chatterjee
- Based on: Crime and Punishment by Fyodor Dostoevsky
- Music by: Laxmikant–Pyarelal
- Release date: 1974
- Country: India
- Language: Hindi

Jurm Aur Sazaa is a 1974 Hindi-language drama film directed by Nisar Ahmad Ansari. It is based on Fyodor Dostoevsky's 1866 novel Crime and Punishment.

== Cast ==
- Vinod Mehra as Ratan
- Nanda as Ricky
- Johnny Walker as Arif
- Helen as Cabaret Dancer
- Nisar Ahmad Ansari as Sohan

== Music ==
The entire soundtrack is available on Polydor (now Universal Music India).

Song	Singer	Lyricist(s)
"Khoobsurat Tu Sanam, Khoobsurat Main"	Kishore Kumar, Asha Bhosle	Asad Bhopali
"Mere Dil, Aaj Tu Maayus Na Ho"	Suman Kalyanpur	Shakeel Badayuni
"Mere Geet Hai"	Mohammed Rafi	Ram Bhardwaj
"Koi Nahin To Sitare Kahenge"	Mohammed Rafi, Vani Jairam	Ram Bhardwaj
"Bhari Mehfil Se Tujhe Na Utha Doon"	Mohammed Rafi, Asha Bhosle	Ram Bhardwaj
