= Chirag Kahan Roshni Kahan =

1959 Indian film by Devendra Goel

- Poster
- Directed by: Devendra Goel
- Written by: Devendra Goel
- Story by: Dhruva Chatterjee
- Produced by: Devendra Goel
- Starring: Rajendra Kumar; Meena Kumari
- Music by: Ravi
- Release date: 14 August 1959
- Country: India
- Language: Hindi

Chirag Kahan Roshni Kahan (transl. Where is the lamp? Where is the light?) is a 1959 Indian Hindi-language film directed and produced by Devendra Goel. The film stars Rajendra Kumar as the protagonist Dr. Anand and Meena Kumari, Honey Irani and Madan Puri in pivotal roles. It was remade in Telugu as Maa Babu in 1960.

== Plot ==
Before giving birth to her child, Ratna loses her husband and eventually gives birth to a dead child. Dr. Anand's wife also gives birth to a baby and she dies on the same day. Ratna's condition after delivery is critical, so to save her, Dr. Anand gives his baby boy Raju to her.

Four years later, Dr. Anand, to meet Raju, re-enters her life and soon becomes a frequent visitor, much to the displeasure of Ratna's mother-in-law and her late husband's sister Bela, both of whom start maltreating her and making her life miserable. Anand stops visiting thereafter. Anand soon marries a nurse called Maya Verma. Maya is a squanderer, and her relationship with Anand falters. Moreover, he later finds out that she cannot conceive. When Anand's father passes away, he leaves considerable wealth to Anand's child, including a substantial monthly allowance. Maya plots with an advocate, S. Prakash, who happens to be Bela's husband, to fabricate a story that Anand's father was mentally unbalanced while writing the testament. This plan fails.

Now along with her aunt, Nurse Sarla Verma, Maya claims that Ratna's son is actually Anand's biological son, leading to their lawyer filing a custodial case in court.

The court gives custody of Raju to Dr. Anand and Maya. Raju is quite unhappy and escapes from Dr. Anand's House at night. Maya, Ratna, and Dr. Anand follow him. Maya dies in an accident while chasing Raju and Raju returns to Ratna. Ratna's mother in law marries her to Dr. Anand and the story ends on a happy note.

== Cast ==
- Rajendra Kumar as Dr. Anand
- Meena Kumari as Ratna
- Madan Puri as Dr. Ashok Mehta
- Honey Irani as Raju, Dr. Anand's son
- Minoo Mumtaz as Nurse Maya Verma, Dr. Anand's wife
- Sunder as Advocate S. Prakash, husband of Bela and Ratna's brother-in-law
- Asit Sen as Dr Anand's dad's solicitor
- Mumtaz Begum as Ratna's mother-in-law
- Nilambai as Nurse Sarla Verma

== Music ==
Song	Singer
"Chirag Kahan Roshni Kahan"	Mohammed Rafi
"Chal Mere Ghode Tik Tik Tik"	Lata Mangeshkar
"Tim Tim Karte Tare" (Happy)	Lata Mangeshkar
"Tim Tim Karte Tare" (Sad)	Lata Mangeshkar
"Bada Bedard Jahan Hai"	Lata Mangeshkar
"Ab To Aankh Lad Chuki"	Suman Kalyanpur
"Aaye Ho To Dekh Lo"	Suman Kalyanpur

== Awards ==
The film received two nominations at the 1960 annual Filmfare Awards:

- Nominated, Filmfare Best Actress Award - Meena Kumari
- Nominated, Filmfare Best Story Award - Dhruva Chatterjee
