= Maa Babu =

- Theatrical release poster
- Directed by: T. Prakash Rao
- Written by: Samudrala Jr (dialogues)
- Screenplay by: T. Prakash Rao
- Based on: Chirag Kahan Roshni Kahan by Dhruva Chatterjee
- Produced by: D. V. S. Raju
- Starring: Akkineni Nageswara Rao; Savitri; M. N. Rajam
- Cinematography: Kamal Ghosh
- Edited by: N. M. Shankar
- Music by: T. Chalapathi Rao
- Production company: Pragathi Art Productions
- Release date: 22 December 1960
- Running time: 143 minutes
- Country: India
- Language: Telugu

Maa Babu (transl. Our Boy) is a 1960 Indian Telugu-language drama film co-written and directed by T. Prakash Rao. The film stars Akkineni Nageswara Rao, Savitri and M. N. Rajam, with music composed by T. Chalapathi Rao. It is a remake of the Hindi film Chirag Kahan Roshni Kahan (1959).

== Cast ==
- Akkineni Nageswara Rao as Dr. Anand
- Savitri as Ratnadevi
- M. N. Rajam as Maya
- Gummadi as Dr. Ashok
- Relangi
- Ramana Reddy
- V. Nagayya
- Mikkilineni
- C.S.R
- Chadalavada as Ramu
- Allu Ramalingaiah
- Kannamba
- Honey Irani
- M. Saroja
- Nalla Ramamurthy

== Soundtrack ==
Music composed by T. Chalapathi Rao.

S. No	Song title	Lyrics	Singers	length
1	"Enta Kalam Enthadooram"	Sri Sri	Ghantasala	4:51
2	"Babu Nidura Po"	Samudrala Jr	P. Susheela	4:34
3	"Chell Chell"	Samudrala Jr	P. Susheela	4:23
4	"O Daarinapoye Chinnavada"	Samudrala Jr	Ghantasala, S. Janaki	5:10
5	"Virese Jhum Jhum"	Samudrala Jr	K. Jamuna Rani	4:09
6	"Edamma Nee Raju"	Samudrala Jr	P. Leela	4:16
7	"Srimathigaru"	Kosaraju	Madhavapeddi Satyam	2:06
