= Do Dil =

1965 film

External videos
- Do Dil (1965) Full Hindi Movie | Rajshree, Biswajit, Pran, Mehmood, Mumtaz
- Kaanton Mein Phansa Aanchal HD| Biswajit, Rajshree | Mohammed Rafi | Do Dil 1965 Song
- Saara Mora Kajra Chhudaya Tune HD| Biswajit, Rajshree | Aarti Mukherjee, Mohammed Rafi| Do Dil Song
- Bam Babam Bam Bam Lahiri | Usha Mangeshkar, Manna Dey | Do Dil 1965 | Holi Song | Biswajit
- प्यासी हिरणी बन बन ढाए | Pyasi Hirni Ban Ban Dhaye | Lata Mangeshkar | Do Dil 1965 Songs | Rajshree
- Man Mora Nache Tan Mora Nache HD| Biswajit, Rajshree | Lata Mangeshkar | Do Dil 1965 Song
- Ram Ram Japna Paraya Maal Apna HD | Mehmood, Mumtaz | Mohammed Rafi | Do Dil 1965 Song
- Tera Husn Rahe Mera Ishq Rahe HD | Biswajit, Rajshree | Mohammed Rafi | Do Dil 1965 Song

Do Dil a film released in 1965 directed by Hrishikesh Mukherjee and produced by N. C. Sippy with production of Uttam Kumar and Uttam Chitra. Music was composed by Hemant Kumar. It was released in Iran by the name Do Del on 5 May 1966.

== Synopsis ==
Manu a prince, is very kind hearted and fights for people against bad guys.

== Cast ==
- Biswajit Chatterjee as Manu
- Rajshree as Bijli
- Mumtaz Askari as Albeli (credited as Mumtaz)
- Mehmood as Bahadur
- Pran Sikand as Kunver Pratap Singh
- Durga Khote as Ranimaa
- Indira as Radhika
- Asit Kumar Sen as Buddhi Singh (credited as Asit Sen)
- Kamal Kapoor as Bijli's dad

== Music ==
Kaifi Azmi was the lyricist of all songs and Music composer for all songs Hemant Kumar.

- "Kaaton Mein Phansa Aachal" [ genre:filmi ] - Mohammed Rafi
- "Saara Mora Kajra Chhuraia Tune" [ genre: sugam, filmi ] - Mohammed Rafi, Aarti Mukherjee
- "Holi re Holi Bam Babam Bam" [ genre:hindi folk ] - Usha Mangeshkar, Manna Dey
- "Pyasi Hirni Ban Ban Dole" [ genre:filmi ] - Lata Mangeshkar
- "Man Mora Naache Tan Mora Naache" [ genre:tribal, filmi ] - Lata Mangeshkar
- "Ram Ram Japna Paraya Maal Apna" [ genre:filmi, rajsthani folk ] - Mohammed Rafi
- "Tera Husn Rahe Mera Ishq Rahe" [ genre:filmi, ghazal ] - Mohammed Rafi

=== Playback ===
- Manna Dey
- Lata Mangeshkar
- Usha Mangeshkar
- Aarti Mukherjee
- Mohammed Rafi
- Suraiya

== Crew ==
- N. C. Sippy - Producer
- Sachin Bhowmick - Story, Screenplay
- Ahsan Rizvi - Dialogue

=== Choreography ===
- Suresh Bhatt
- Satyanarayan

=== Stunt ===
- Azam
