= Palki (film) =

- Directed by: Mahesh Kaul; S. U. Sunny
- Starring: Rajendra Kumar; Waheeda Rehman
- Music by: Naushad
- Release date: 1967
- Country: India
- Language: Hindi

Palki (transl. The Palanquin) is a 1967 Indian Hindi-language film directed by Mahesh Kaul and S. U. Sunny. It stars Rajendra Kumar and Waheeda Rehman, and features a soundtrack composed by Naushad.

Palki was a box office failure and, according to Film World, contributed to Rajendra Kumar's diminishing stardom in the late 1960s.

== Plot ==
Naseem (Rajendra Kumar), an impoverished poet in Lucknow, is in love with his neighbour Mehro (Waheeda Rehman), to whom he is betrothed. The two live in adjoining homes with their respective families and communicate through a hole in the wall separating their houses. Mehro lives with her brother Sultan (Johnny Walker), while Naseem resides with his mother.

A Nawab (Rehman) hosts a poetry competition, in which Naseem wins a substantial prize. The money would enable him to marry Mehro, but Naseem refuses it after feeling insulted by members of the gathering who ridicule his poverty. Sultan later retrieves the money through a ruse and uses it to arrange Mehro's wedding. At the wedding, however, Mehro demands to see the bride price before revealing herself, exposing the deception. The marriage is left unconsummated, and Naseem leaves for Bombay, determined to earn enough money to repay the Nawab and restore the honour of both families.

In Bombay, Naseem receives employment at the docks through a businessman, Jaffarbhai (Nazir Hussain). When arsonists set fire to part of the port, Naseem risks his life to rescue Jaffarbhai's son from the burning building. A false report of Naseem's death reaches Lucknow, leaving Mehro devastated. After recovering from his injuries, Naseem returns to Lucknow and discovers that Mehro has been married to the Nawab. The second marriage is also left unconsummated when the Nawab learns that Mehro remains devoted to Naseem.

Naseem subsequently enters the Nawab's household as a poetry tutor. Mehro, bound by the conventions of her household, finds a way to communicate with him by disguising herself in a shroud and appearing as a ghost. Their predicament is eventually addressed during a qawwali performance, after which the Nawab accepts the depth of Mehro's attachment to Naseem. He ultimately relinquishes his claim to Mehro, allowing the lovers to reunite.

== Cast ==
- Rajendra Kumar as Naseem, an impoverished poet of Lucknow
- Waheeda Rehman as Mehro, Naseem's betrothed and neighbour
- Johnny Walker as Sultan, Mehro's brother
- Rehman as the Nawab, a patron of poetry and Mehro's second husband
- Nazir Hussain as Jaffarbhai, a businessman in Bombay
- Pratima Devi as Naseem's mother
