= Mehboob Ki Mehndi =

1971 film

- Directed by: H. S. Rawail
- Written by: Anjana Rawail
- Screenplay by: Gulzar; H. S. Rawail
- Produced by: H. S. Rawail
- Starring: Rajesh Khanna; Leena Chandavarkar; Pradeep Kumar
- Cinematography: Munir Khan
- Edited by: V. K. Naik
- Music by: Laxmikant–Pyarelal
- Release date: 19 February 1971
- Running time: 153 minutes
- Country: India
- Language: Hindi

Mehboob Ki Mehndi is a 1971 Indian Hindi-language romantic musical film produced and directed by H. S. Rawail. The film stars Rajesh Khanna, Leena Chandavarkar and Pradeep Kumar in lead roles.

It was based on Muslim Tahzeeb (culture) of the bygone Nawab era, wherein the a young rich Muslim man Yusuf agrees to marry a prostitute's daughter. It showed the importance of education in Muslims as preached by Mahatma Gandhi. Shabana, the heroine is able to save herself, and her family, only by educating herself and doing the job of tutor.

== Plot ==
The film starts with Shabana performing at a singing competition in her college. She lives with her foster grandmother/ nanny in Bombay, while her mother, Najma stays away from her in Hyderabad with her exploitative partner, Nisaar Ahmed, who is a pimp. He forces Najma to live the life of a prostitute. However, Najma doesn't tell her daughter about this and Shabana doesn't have any idea about her mother's miserable life. One day, she is back from her college after winning a singing competition. Shabana is expecting her mother to visit within 2–3 days, but the doorbell rings and the postman comes with a telegram, which comes from Hyderabad, informing her of her mother's illness. She goes to Hyderabad with her nanny where she finds out the truth. When her mother learns of this, she kills herself. In fact, it was Nisaar who had sent the telegram to trick Shabana into coming to Hyderabad because now, he wants to use her for prostitution as her mother is past her prime. But her grandmother cleverly saves her and takes her to Lucknow, where her foster brother stays. When they come to her brother's house, they learn that he died recently. His foster son (interestingly named Moonhbole which means Foster) is happy to welcome them into the house. The next day, the young and handsome Yusuf, son of a wealthy royal Nawab Safdarjung who is physically handicapped and uses a wheelchair, comes to Shabana's house. He mistakes Shabana for her cousin Moonhbole as she sleeps under a coverlet and whacks her bottom. As she wakes and screams in fear, Yusuf is mesmerised by her beauty and at the same time, both are confused. Yusuf learns about Shabana from her cousin. He has an impish little nephew, Khalid, nicknamed Firangi (which means foreigner). Firangi's tutor, tired of his mischievous behaviour, throws up her job after he sets a white mouse upon her at Yusuf's instigation. Yusuf then arranges to bring Shabana as the new teacher.

One night, Yusuf discovers a thief in his bedroom. But the elderly man Khairuddin's honesty and well spoken nature impresses him so much that he appoints him as caretaker to his old father, the nawab. However, the thief Khairuddin (Nawab Anwar Kamaal in the garb of a servant) had arrived there with the intention of killing Yusuf owing to an old enmity with his father, the nawab. It was later revealed that Khairuddin's father (Murad) was Nawab Sajjad Hussain whose wealth and family home was seized by Safdarjung 18 years ago, after he was unable to repay a debt. It was also revealed that Khairuddin had served life imprisonment for killing Najma's step-uncle after she was kicked out of her house on the suspicion that she was going to give birth to an illegitimate child.

Shabana and Yusuf gradually fall in love. Nawab Safdarjung is happy with the relationship and starts arranging their marriage. Just before their wedding, Shabana gives Khairu a letter which was addressed to Yusuf, revealing that she was the daughter of a courtesan named Najma. Khairu, after reading it, realises she is his daughter by Najma. Upon learning of the impending marriage, Nisaar arrives as a servant named Usman to blackmail Shabana into returning to the brothel. He threatens to reveal her mother's background to Yusuf and his family and disgrace them in society and consequently get the wedding called off. He demands she hand over all her jewellery and money in Yusuf's house to him. He also tries to molest her at gunpoint but she tricks him to snatch his pistol and fatally shoots him. Khairu arrives after hearing her scream and in order to protect her, shoots Nisaar repeatedly as everyone rushed into the room. The real truth about Khairu and Yusuf's fathers and real relationships are revealed by Yusuf in the ensuing murder trial after he finds two letters in Khairu's room. One was from Khairu to Safdarjung in which Khairu takes responsibility for killing Yusuf as revenge and the other one was the letter from Shabana to Yusuf, torn to bits by Khairu, which contained the truth about her background. In a happy ending, Yusuf and Shabana get married. The film closes with the mischievous nephew Firangi intruding upon the newlyweds' boudoir.

== Cast ==
- Rajesh Khanna as Yusuf
- Leena Chandavarkar as Shabana
- Pradeep Kumar as Nawab Anwar Kamaal / Khairuddin "Khairu"
- Sunder as Hakim Sahab
- Iftekhar as Nawab Safdarjung
- Manorama as Mrs. Albert
- Paro as Naani
- Master Kishore as Khalid "Firangi"
- Jagdish Raj as Nisar Ahmed / Usmaan
- Farooque Kartoos as Moonhbole
- Gurnam Singh as Gurnam
- Mumtaz Begum as Shabana's grandmother
- Kamal Kapoor as Public Prosecutor Khanna

== Soundtrack ==
All the songs were composed by Laxmikant–Pyarelal with lyrics penned by Anand Bakshi.

Title	Singer(s)	Raga
"Mere Deewanepan Ki Bhi Dawa Nahin..."	Kishore Kumar	
"Mehboob Ki Mehandi Haathon Mein..."	Lata Mangeshkar	
"Jane Kyon Log Mohabbat Kiya Karte Hain..."	Lata Mangeshkar	
"Apna Hai Tu Begana Nahin..."	Mohammed Rafi	
"Pasand Aa Gai Hai Ek Kafir Haseena..."	Mohammed Rafi	
"Ye Jo Chilman Hai, Dushman Hai Hamari..."	Mohammed Rafi	
"Itna To Yaad Hai Mujhe..."	Mohammed Rafi, Lata Mangeshkar	Tilang
"Mehboob Ki Mehndi..."	Lata Mangeshkar, Hemlata	

== Reception ==
Mehboob Ki Mehndi failed commercially upon release and ended Rajesh Khanna's dream run at the box office which began with Aradhana (1969). However, the film did better in repeat runs during the 1980s owing to superhit music and nostalgia of seeing Khanna in his prime and eventually emerged an "average" grosser.
