= Dhan Daulat =

1980 Indian film by Harish Shah

- Directed by: Harish Shah
- Screenplay by: Sachin Bhowmik
- Story by: Sachin Bhowmik
- Produced by: Vinod Shah
- Starring: Rajendra Kumar; Mala Sinha; Rishi Kapoor; Neetu Singh
- Cinematography: Munir Khan
- Edited by: Bimal Roy
- Music by: R. D. Burman
- Release date: 11 January 1980
- Country: India
- Language: Hindi

Dhan Daulat is a 1980 Indian Hindi-language masala film directed by Harish Shah and produced by Vinod Shah. It stars Rishi Kapoor and Neetu Singh in pivotal roles.

== Plot ==
Lucky (Rishi Kapoor) is raised by two truckdriver fathers, Mangat (Prem Nath) and Bajirao (Pran) after he is separated from his mother by mistake. They raise him and care of him as if he's their own, dreaming of him to have a successful future.

20 to 22 years later, Lucky grows up a mischievous boy causing troubles in his village, namely stealing chickens. He faces bullying in college for his parents being truckdrivers, he is expelled after he picks a fight with them.

He is locked inside his room, where by window he meets Shanti (Neetu Singh). Shanti's father dislikes Lucky, and while escaping his wrath he unknowingly hides in his mother, Vasudha's (Mala Sinha) fruit-selling shop.

He steals Sujit Chopra's (Prem Chopra) precious horse trying to impress Shanti, working as a tangewala. Upon finding him, Sujit gains interest in Lucky.

Later, Lucky has a business idea to sell matches. Mangat and Bajirao, being poor can't pay to start the business. For Lucky's business, they sell their truck which is not liked by Lucky – but Vasudha supports this decision and the entire village is ready to support Lucky's business. Thus, Lucky's matches-selling gig "Apna Matches" is realized.

Raj Saxena's (Rajendra Kumar) profits begin to drop due to Apna Matches, as they are cheaper. As a response, they buy out all stocks of Apna Matches and ruin them by water to later sell. Meanwhile, Shanti's father disapproves of Lucky and Shanti's relationship as he has no familial background and is ill-mannered. Lucky himself is shocked to find out that he is adopted, and promises Shanti's father to not step in their house or have any relation with Shanti until he discovers his true parents.

Mangat and Bajirao tell Lucky that he was found, abandoned in their truck. Vasudha, who was listening in, is shocked to hear. Lucky begins to hate Mangat and Bajirao for being the reason he be insulted, as well as whoever his real parents may be for leaving him – for which Vasudha scolds him.

Lucky's business also falls due to Raj's scheme, the former confronts the latter for his capitalist schemes. Lucky meets Sujit again, both enemies of Raj, Sujit tells him that with money, his familial background and nothing will matter anymore. So Lucky leaves his house, ignoring his fathers warnings. Lucky joins Sujit's illegal business, taking up drinking and womanizing.

While their village is forced to empty and threatened to be broken down, Raj and Vasudha meet again. It is revealed that they were husband-wife. Raj and Vasudha later meet personally.

Raj feels guilty for Vasudha's state. He had gotten into a life-threatening accident. Seth Gopaldas, for whom Raj had worked for, had saved his life, giving a new one all-together. He was unsuccessful on finding Vasudha after recovery and had a second marriage with Gopaldas' late daughter. Which makes Vasudha unhappy, though still Raj wishes to help Vasudha – which Vasudha rejects.

Lucky ruins Raj's business with a similar scheme that was used on Apna Matches, enjoying his new, rich life. For a party, he visits his village once more to bring Mangat and Bajirao with him, giving them money, but they reject it. He tries to bring Vasudha with him, but even she rejects him.

He tries to bring Shanti with him, and she does come with him. But upon arriving, she gets uncomfortable by the rich culture and wishes to go back home. Lucky gets angry at Shanti so she leaves, hurt.

Coming to meet Shanti again, Sujit's words are proven true when Shanti's father treats him with kindness. Though, Shanti has nothing to do with him. Lucky slowly realizes his folly and reconnects with his loved ones, leaving Sujit. By the end, Shanti and Lucky's marriage is planned as her father finally approves of them, Mangat and Bajirao being still recognized as Lucky's fathers, along with Raj and Vasudha reuniting.

== Cast ==
- Rajendra Kumar as Raj Saxena
- Mala Sinha as Vasudha Saxena
- Rishi Kapoor as Lucky Saxena
- Neetu Singh as Shanti
- Prem Chopra Sujit Chopra
- Premnath as Mangat
- Pran as Bajirao
- Sujit Kumar as Sudhir Verma
- Madan Puri as Pukhraj ,Shanti's father
- Kader Khan as Imaandar , Laajo's father
- Agha as Rahim Miyan
- Vikas Anand as Police Inspector Mohan Kumar Khanna
- Preeti Ganguli as Laajo
- Jagdish Raj as Police Inspector Nath
- Avtaar Gill as D,souza
- Azaad Irani Bhaskar , Sudhir's friend

== Soundtrack ==
The music for the film was by R. D. Burman while the lyrics were written by Majrooh Sultanpuri.

Song	Singer
"Khudkushi Karne Ka Dil Mein Iraada Kar Liya"	Kishore Kumar
"Jeena Kya Aji Pyar Bina, Jeevan Ke Yahi Chaar Dina"	Kishore Kumar, Asha Bhosle
"Ho Jaaye Phir Us Din Ka Jo Vaada Hai"	Kishore Kumar, Asha Bhosle
"Woh Jinki Nai Yeh Duniya, Manzil Hai Nai"	Kishore Kumar, Asha Bhosle
"Shikwa Koi Tum Se, Na Hai Tum Pe Koi Zor"	Asha Bhosle
