= Hum Hain Lajawab =

Hum Hain Lajawaab
- Directed by: Mohan Segal
- Produced by: Jawaharlal Bafna; Vasant Doshi
- Starring: Kumar Gaurav; Padmini Kolhapure; Shakti Kapoor
- Music by: Rahul Dev Burman; Anand Bakshi (lyrics)
- Release date: 21 August 1984 (India)
- Country: India
- Language: Hindi

Hum Hain Lajawaab is 1984 Hindi language Drama film directed by Mohan Segal and starring Kumar Gaurav, Padmini Kolhapure in lead roles.

== Plot ==
Thakur is a wealthy, principled, and punctual man, who will not tolerate anything, even music in his palatial home. Thakur's only motto in life is money, and each and every second is spent on making and earning money. His elder son, Amar Kumar rebels against this, and is warned. But Amar does not heed this warning, and falls in love with a poor gypsy girl, Jyoti, and both elope in order to escape the wrath of his dad. Thakur second son, Pawan Kumar, is sent away abroad so that there are no lingering bad influences on his life. Years later, Pawan returns home, and is the exact cold-hearted and arrogant image as his dad. Amar and his wife give birth to a son, and Amar writes to his dad to forgive him. Shortly thereafter the couple pass away, leaving their son, with Jyoti's sister, Dilruba. Thakur decides to forgive his late son and asks Pawan to go and bring his grandson home. Pawan sets forth to get his nephew, with the help of MGM, and meets a host of less-than-fortunate people. His attitude does not get him anywhere with Dilruba and he is forced to assume another identity, that of Aashiq, to try and get his nephew home. He does succeed in pulling wool over Dilruba's eyes and both eventually fall in love with each other - little knowing that his dad has already planned his marriage with wealthy Meenakshi and if he refuses he may suffer the same fate as Amar.

== Cast ==
- Kumar Gaurav as Thakur Pawan Kumar Singh
- Padmini Kolhapure as Dilruba
- Shakti Kapoor as Advocate B. K. Shrivastav
- Monty Nath as Dilawar Singh
- Mayur Verma as Thakur Amar Kumar
- Huma Khan as Jyoti (Amar Kumar's wife)
- Kalpana Iyer as Alif-Laila
- Kamal Kapoor as Thakur Karan Kumar Singh
- Yunus Parvez as Thamani Seth
- Kiran Vairale as Meenakshi 'Meena'
- Rakesh Bedi as Marorimal Karodimal Thakkatram Makhanwala 'M.G.M.'
- Ravindra Kapoor as John Pascal
- Sudhir Dalvi as Tribal Leader, Jyoti's Dad
- Vikas Anand as Diwan
- Viju Khote
- Jagdish Raj as Khan Saab
- Shivraj as Ram Kishan
- Mohan Choti as Basti Manager
- Praveen Kumar as Goon

== Trivia ==
In this film only Office scenes have been remade from Junglee, produced and directed by Subodh Mukherjee starring Shammi Kapoor and Saira Banu. In both movies Actor Shivraj has played the role of employee. Only difference is that Manager/Uncle role is played by Actor Vikas Anand and Actor Shivraj has played a role of employee in this movie.

== Soundtrack ==
Lyrics: Anand Bakshi

Song	Singer
"Main Dariya Hoon"	Kishore Kumar
"Dankeki Chot Se"	Kishore Kumar, Meena
"Dilbar Diljaani"	Asha Bhosle, R. D. Burman
"Aaya Shabab Aaya"	Lata Mangeshkar
"Duniya Badal Gayi Hai"	Lata Mangeshkar, Anwar
"Koi Pardesi Aaya"	Anwar
"Main Dilruba Hoon"	Kavita Krishnamurthy
