= Jangal Mein Mangal =

- Directed by: Rajendra Bhatia
- Starring: Kiran Kumar; Reena Roy
- Music by: Shankar–Jaikishan
- Release date: 27 December 1972
- Country: India
- Language: Hindi

Jangal Mein Mangal is a 1972 Bollywood romance film directed by Rajendra Bhatia. The film stars Kiran Kumar, Reena Roy and Pran.

== Plot ==
Biology Professor Laxmi, in the company of nine of her students, and a convent nun, Sophia, go on a field trip in Kerala, Southern India. Upon arrival, they decide to stay there at a Public Rooming House, which also happens to house another group of students, this time all male, headed by Retired Colonel M.K. Das. After several misunderstandings both the groups compromise and decide to pass the rest of their temporary stay in peace. But fate has other plans for them, for Sophia is killed, apparently murdered by a zombie-like creature, dressed in black, who lives in a nearby grave-yard. Before the police and the others could react, a male student is killed. Three male students do encounter this creature, but it manages to over-power all three, and no amount of force or bullets can stop it. Its main motive seems to kill anyone who stands in its way, including the police!

== Cast ==
- Kiran Kumar as Rajesh
- Reena Roy as Leela
- Balraj Sahni as Thomas
- Pran as Retired Colonel M. K. Das / Raghu (Double Role)
- Chandrashekhar as CBI Officer Shekhar / Boatman
- Sonia Sahni as Professor Laxmi
- Narendranath as Baldev
- Jayshree T. as Saroj
- Meena T. as Lata
- Meena Roy as Sophia
- Gulshan Bawra as Lalu
- Jagdish Raj as Senior Police Inspector
- Paintal as Totaram
- V. Gopal as Constable Bahadur Singh
- Chaman Puri as Village Head
- Bharat Kapoor as Police Inspector
- Krishan Dhawan as Ratanlal
- Upendra Trivedi as Main Villain

== Soundtrack ==
Song	Singer
"Tum Kitni Khoobsurat Ho"	Kishore Kumar
"Kal Ki Na Karo Baat"	Kishore Kumar
"Ae Bagh Ki Kaliyon Sharm Karo, Sharm Karo"	Kishore Kumar, Mohammed Rafi
"Dekhta Hai Kya"	Asha Bhosle
"Chhori Mujhko Hua Tujhse"	Asha Bhosle
"Meri Nazron Ne Kaise Kaise"	Asha Bhosle
"Awara Bhanwaron Sharm Karo, Tum Sharm Karo"	Asha Bhosle, Usha Mangeshkar
