= Blackmail (1973 film) =

- Film poster
- Directed by: Vijay Anand
- Written by: Vijay Anand; Vinod Kumar
- Produced by: Vinod Doshi
- Starring: Dharmendra; Raakhee; Shatrughan Sinha
- Cinematography: N.V. Srinivas
- Edited by: Vijay Anand
- Music by: Kalyanji-Anandji
- Production company: R. K. Studios
- Distributed by: V. R. Pictures; Vinod Doshi Productions; Digital Entertainment; Polydor
- Release date: 30 November 1973
- Running time: 146 minutes
- Country: India
- Language: Hindi

Blackmail is a 1973 Hindi-language thriller film directed by Vijay Anand. The film stars Dharmendra, Raakhee, Shatrughan Sinha in lead roles. Many critics consider it one of Vijay Anand's underrated works.

== Plot ==
Professor Ramakant Khurana, an eccentric scientist, discovers a formula to generate electricity from sunlight. This discovery makes him very popular, and his formula very much in demand, while local businessman, Mr. Mehta, feels threatened: this may means losses and eventual bankruptcy. Mehta and his associate, Jeevan, who is also his daughter, Asha's sweetheart, conceive a plan to get Asha married to Dr. Khurana's nephew, Kailash Gupta; inherit part of the estate as well as the business along with the formula; and thereby eliminate their potential bankruptcy. Their only problem is Asha, who may not cooperate, so a drama is arranged between Jeevan and her, which leads to Jeevan backing away from any marriage plans and going to settle in Europe. Asha thus agrees to marry Kailash, who has fallen head-over-heels in love with her. The marriage takes place, but there are misunderstandings in their lives on the very first night as Kailash feels that Asha is hiding something from him and secretly meeting someone during odd hours of the night. The person turns out to be Jeevan, who now blackmails Asha with some illicit photographs he took of her in past without her knowledge. Jeevan demands that Asha gives him blueprint of the Professor Khurana's newfound discovery. Things become bitter between Kailash and Asha, as Kailash suspects Asha is cheating on him. Asha, unable to help herself, discloses everything to Professor Khurana, who tricks Jeevan and solves issue between Kailash and Asha. Upon realizing he was tricked, Jeevan kidnaps Asha and asks for the blueprint/formula as ransom. Kailash confronts Jeevan and duo engage in a fight. Jeevan, realizing his mistake, commits suicide. The couple reunite as the police arrive.

== Cast ==
- Dharmendra as Kailash Gupta
- Raakhee as Asha Kailash Gupta/Mehta
- Shatrughan Sinha as Jeevan
- Madan Puri as Professor Ramakant Khurana
- Iftekhar as Mr. Mehta
- Kamal Kapoor as Dr. J.K. Shetty
- Jagdish Raj as Mr. Das
- Keshav Rana as Police Commissioner

== Music ==
"Pal Pal Dil Ke Paas Tum Rehti Ho" sung by Kishore Kumar was recreated by Abhijit Vaghani in the 2016 film Wajah Tum Ho, and its title inspired a 2019 movie of the same name.

Other songs are "Mile Mile Do Badan, Khile Khile Do Chaman", "Main Doob Doob Jata Hoon" sung by Kishore Kumar. All lyrics were by Rajendra Krishan.

Song	Singer
"Pal Pal Dil Ke Paas"	Kishore Kumar
"Main Doob Jata Hoon"	Kishore Kumar
"Mile Mile Do Badan Khile Khile Do Chaman"	Kishore Kumar, Lata Mangeshkar
"Asha O Asha"	Lata Mangeshkar
"Naina Mere Rangbhare"	Lata Mangeshkar
