= Tangewala =

- Directed by: Naresh Kumar
- Starring: Rajendra Kumar; Mumtaz; Sujit Kumar
- Music by: Naushad
- Release date: 1972
- Country: India
- Language: Hindi

Tangewala is a 1972 Bollywood action film directed by Naresh Kumar. The film stars Rajendra Kumar and Mumtaz.

== Plot ==
Zamindar Thakur played by (Sujit Kumar) is an arrogant, alcoholic, womanizer. His Munimji (Kanhaiyalal) procures women for him frequently. In order to get even with Raju (Rajendra Kumar), Zamindar asks his munim to get Raju's sister, Gauri (Kumud Chhugani). Thakur and Gauri meet, and has slowly Gauri trusting him, then he marries her in an isolated temple with the munim posing as a priest. Gauri gets pregnant, and she and Rajoo go to the Thakur so that he can marry her, but Thakur denies ever knowing her, leave alone marrying her, and Munimji supports the Thakur. Gauri and family are devastated and leave the village. Gauri gives birth to a baby boy, and Raju arranges for Gauri to remarry, however, on the day of the marriage she runs away. Raju's love life with Paro (Mumtaz) has been on hold, and Raju's mom is awaiting the return of her husband, so with Gauri running away they have to now re-locate again. Raju returns to the village to avenge his sister, instead he is arrested by the police and jailed, leaving his mother, nephew, and Gauri to fend for themselves.

== Cast ==
- Rajendra Kumar as Rai Bahadur Kishandas / Raju / Dilbahadur Khan
- Mumtaz
- Sujit Kumar as Zamindar
- Bhagwan
- Mohan Choti
- Kumud Chuggani as Gauri
- I. S. Johar as Nagina
- Kanhaiyalal as Munimji / Panditji
- Kamini Kaushal as Laxmi
- Mehmood Jr.
- Leela Mishra as Mausi
- Paintal
- Jagdish Raj as Police Inspector

== Songs ==
All songs were composed by Naushad and written by Majrooh Sultanpuri.

- 1. "Jawani Bar Bar Nahi Aaye" – Lata Mangeshkar
- 2. "Do Diwane Aaye" – Mohammed Rafi and Asha Bhosle
- 3. "Thap Thup Thip Ki Taal Pe Mera" – Mohammed Rafi
- 4. "Kar Bhala Hoga Bhala" – Mukesh
- 5. "Aisa Phanda Mare Gori" – Mohammed Rafi and Asha Bhosle
- 6. "Aayi Re Khilone Waku Aayi" – Lata Mangeshkar
