= Trisandhya =

- Directed by: Raj Marbros
- Written by: based on short story by P.C. Kuttikrishnan Nair; screenplay by Raj Marbros
- Produced by: Raj Marbros
- Starring: Waheeda Rehman, Bhasker Unni, P.K. Abraham, Latha Menon
- Cinematography: Sudarshan Nag
- Release date: 1972
- Country: India
- Language: Hindi/Malayalam

Trisandhya is a 1972 Bollywood drama film directed by Raj Marbros. The film stars Bhaskar Unni, P.K. Abraham and Waheeda Rehman.
