= Jai Jwala =

- Directed by: Manohar Deepak
- Written by: Kumar Yadav
- Produced by: Vikram Valla
- Starring: Sunil Dutt, Madhumati Deepak
- Cinematography: S. Mukherjee
- Edited by: Avinash Gokhle
- Music by: Mahendra Kapoor
- Distributed by: Sheemaroo
- Release date: 1972
- Country: India
- Language: Hindi

Jai Jwala also known as Puja Aur Payal is a 1972 Hindi drama film directed by Manohar Deepak. The film stars Sunil Dutt(brief role), Sujit Kumar and Madhumati M. Deepak.

== Soundtrack ==
#	Song title	Singer
1	"Maa Tu Durga"	Asha Bhonsle
2	"Jhoot Bolna Paap Hai"	Mahendra Kapoor, Kanchan
3	"Mere Angana Mein Jhoomti Gaati"	Asha Bhosle
4	"Rang Hoon Noor Hoon"	Asha Bhonsle
5	"Teri Jyot Jale"	Mohammed Rafi, Manhar Udhas, Kanchan
6	"Ye To Mumkin Hi Nahi"	Mohammed Rafi

== Reception ==
Organiser wrote, "directed by Manohar Deepak and produced by K. D. Sharma. Mata Vaishno Devi was about gods and goddesses, Jai Jwala is concerned with human beings and their faith in the Goddess of Light who never foresakes her devotees ..."
