= Ganwaar =

1970 film by Naresh Kumar

- Film Poster
- Directed by: Naresh Kumar
- Screenplay by: Dhruva Chatterjee
- Produced by: Naresh Kumar
- Starring: Rajendra Kumar; Vyjayanthimala
- Cinematography: Babubhai Udeshi
- Edited by: Govind Dalwadi
- Music by: Naushad
- Release date: 1970
- Country: India
- Language: Hindi

Ganwaar is a 1970 Indian film produced and directed by Naresh Kumar. It stars Rajendra Kumar, Vyjayanthimala, Pran, Jeevan in pivotal roles. The film's music is by Naushad. This is Vyjayanthimala's last film. The film proved that Naushad is not only good at classical, but modern music as well.

== Plot ==
Raja Sahib is a pious and good-hearted man. After the death of his wife, he sent his only son Gopal (Rajendra Kumar) to England for higher education and got married. His young wife handed over the management of the lands to her brother Vijay Bahadur (Pran) leaving him helpless in these matters. Vijay Bahadur is a terror to helpless farmers. When Paro (Vyjayanthimala) comes to stay in that village, she decides to raise her voice against this terror and take a deputation to Raja Sahib in the city. Gopal returns with new ideas about farming, wanting to make his father's jagir an example of prosperity, where the tenants and the landlords live in peace and harmony. When Paro comes to the city with the farmers, Gopal is shocked to hear the tale of their misery and plight. He interferes but his stepmother opposes him. He disappears from home and disguises himself as Garibdas to make his dream come true. He mixes up with the farmers and lives with them. Vijay Bahadur sets fire to the crops ready for harvest and not a single grain is left for the villagers. When Gopal finds the truth, he wants to expose Vijay Bahadur, but before he can do so, Vijay Bahadur manages to get him murdered by Garibdas. Garibdas is produced in the court where it is revealed that Garibdas and Gopal are in fact two faces of the same person.

== Cast ==
- Rajendra Kumar as Gopal Rai / Garibdas
- Vyjayanthimala as Parvati "Paro"
- Pran as Vijay Bahadur
- Jeevan as Bajrangilal
- Tarun Bose as Raja Ram Pratap Rai
- Nishi as Mrs. Rai
- David as Khan
- Viju Khote as Villager
- Ram Mohan as Hariya
- Tabassum as Mistress
- Dulari as Gopal's Mother

== Soundtrack ==
Rajendra Krishan wrote all the songs.

Song	Singer
"Ae Kisanon"	Mahendra Kapoor
"Main Hoon Ganwaar"	Mohammed Rafi
"Tumhara Naam Kya Hai"	Mohammed Rafi
"Peekar Sharab Khelunga"	Mohammed Rafi
"Humse To Achhi Teri Payal Gori"	Mohammed Rafi, Asha Bhosle
"Tera Chikna Roop Hai Aisa, Anar Jaise Gadarila Pagli"	Mohammed Rafi, Asha Bhosle
