= Sunehra Sansar =

- Release poster
- Directed by: Adurthi Subba Rao
- Written by: Inder Raj Anand (dialogues)
- Story by: M. Prabhakar Reddy
- Produced by: Vadde Shobhanadri; A. S. R. Anjaneyulu
- Starring: Rajendra Kumar; Mala Sinha; Hema Malini
- Music by: Naushad
- Release date: 1975
- Country: India
- Language: Hindi

Sunehra Sansar is a 1975 Bollywood film directed by Adurthi Subba Rao. It stars Rajendra Kumar, with Mala Sinha as his wife, and Hema Malini as his past love, who has re-entered his life to seek vengeance for abandoning her years ago.

The film is a remake of a Telugu film titled Pandanti Kapuram (1972).

In the annals of Hindi cinema, this movie, though not a commercial success, is unique for three reasons. First, it features music by Naushad, collaborating for the first time with the lyricist Anand Bakshi. Secondly, this picture has for the only time Kishore Kumar singing a song (in a duet with Asha Bhosle), for which music was composed by Naushad. Thirdly, the movie has the leading lady Hema Malini playing a rare negative role. Hema Malini's role, like in 'Lal Patthar', has negative shades to it, though in both movies, the character played by her becomes positive in the end.

== Plot ==
Chandrashekhar (Rajendra Kumar), younger brother of Shankarlal (Om Prakash), marries an orphan named Laxmi (Mala Sinha) on insistence of Shankarlal's dying wife. Chandrashekhar and Laxmi soon have three children, a girl and two boys. Chandrashekhar's elder brother, Madhu (Ramesh Deo), returns home as the local District Collector, and marries wealthy Shobha (Seema Deo), daughter of Chamanlal (David), while Ravi is romancing his beautiful neighbor, Neelu. All is going well till when the mill where Chandrashekhar is employed goes on strike. The mill-owner sells the mill to Rani Padmavati, who first of all wants Chandrashekhar to be fired before she can consider the workers' demands. The workers go on an indefinite hunger strike until Chandrashekhar decides to quit his job and re-locates to the city to look for work. In the meantime, misunderstandings crop up between Shobha and the rest of the family, and she and Madhu leave the house to live with Chamanlal. Chandrashekhar is unable to find any employment as Rani Padmavati refuses to give him a reference and on the contrary uses her influence to ensure that he never gets a job. Defeated by circumstances Chandrashekhar returns home to find out that the Rani had ganged up with the local money-lenders and has taken over his land and property. Then the police arrest Chandrashekhar on the complaint filed by the Rani on the charge of stealing from his former employer. On the verge of losing her ill son, Laxmi, now penniless, must now find out why Rani Padmavati has taken it upon herself to ruin this family.

== Cast ==
- Rajendra Kumar as Chandrashekhar
- Mala Sinha as Laxmi
- Hema Malini as Savita / Rani Padmavati
- Sujit Kumar as Mohan (Rani's Secretary)
- Om Prakash as Shankarlal
- David Abraham as Chamanlal (Shobha's Father)
- Asrani as Popat
- Ramesh Deo as Madhu
- Seema Deo as Shobha
- Sulochana Chatterjee as Savita's Aunty
- Rajendra Nath as Professor Ravin Bose
- Manorama as Mrs. Ravin Bose
- Romesh Sharma as Ravi
- Priti Sapru as Neelu (Bhanwarlal's Daughter)
- Sunder as Bhanwarlal

== Soundtrack ==
The music was composed by Naushad and released by Saregama. All lyrics were penned by Anand Bakshi.

Sunehra Sansar

Soundtrack album by Naushad
- Released: 1975
- Recorded: 1975
- Genre: Soundtrack
- Length: 20:14
- Label: Saregama
- Producer: Naushad

Naushad chronology
My Friend (1974)	Sunehra Sansar (1975)	Aaina (1977)

Song	Singer
"Hello Hello, Kya Haal Hai"	Kishore Kumar, Asha Bhosle
"Bheegi Bheegi Hawa Hai, Kali Kali Ghata Hai"	Lata Mangeshkar, Mukesh
"Meri Jawani Meri Dushman Bani Re"	Lata Mangeshkar, Sushma Shrestha
"Babul Ke Ghar Ke Baad"	Mohammed Rafi
"Is Ghar Mein Koi Deewaar Nahin"	Mahendra Kapoor
"Is Ghar Me Koi Deewaar Nahin" (Sad)	Mahendra Kapoor
