= Sone Ka Dil Lohe Ke Haath =

- Directed by: Naresh Kumar
- Starring: Rajendra Kumar; Vidya Sinha
- Music by: Usha Khanna
- Release date: 1978
- Country: India
- Language: Hindi

Sone Ka Dil Lohe Ke Haath (lit. 'Heart of gold, hand of iron') is a 1978 Indian Hindi-language action film directed by Naresh Kumar. Kumar stars in a physically demanding and tension-filled role. The film did "average box office."

== Cast ==
- Rajendra Kumar as Shankar
- Vidya Sinha as Parvati
- Mala Sinha as Mother
- Dara Singh as Nihalchand
- Nazir Hussain as Balkishan
- Aruna Irani as Dancer
- Kamal Kapoor as Dinanath Mathur
- Viju Khote as Birju
- Ram Mohan as Ramu Ustad
- Jagdish Raj as Police Inspector

== Music ==
All songs were penned by Asad Bhopali

Song	Singer
"Sone Ka Dil, Lohe Ke Haath"	K. J. Yesudas
"Yeh To Kal Ki Hai Baat"	Hemlata
"Aaya Re Aaya Khilonewala"	Mohammed Rafi
"Mohabbat Ho Gayi Hai, Qayamat Ho Gayi Hai"	Mohammed Rafi, Asha Bhosle
