= Bin Phere Hum Tere =

- Directed by: Rajat Rakshit
- Starring: Asha Parekh; Vinod Mehra
- Music by: Usha Khanna
- Release date: 14 September 1979
- Country: India
- Language: Hindi

Bin Phere Hum Tere is a 1979 Bollywood drama film directed by Rajat Rakshit. The film stars Asha Parekh and Vinod Mehra.

== Plot ==
Jamuna lives a poor lifestyle in Gangapur with her widowed step-mother. When she is of marriageable age, she is sold to a brothel where Jamuna is confined and forced to dance and sing against her will. She does manage to escape one day, and comes to the rescue of two runaway twins, Raju and Debu, and takes them to Bandra, Bombay, to their cancer-ridden father, Jagdish Sharma. Jagdish and Jamuna form a bond though no formal marriage is performed. Jamuna continues to look after the twins after Jagdish passes away, and endures many difficulties raising them.

Years later, the twins have grown up. Raju is employed in a factory. Debu is a doctor. Raju falls in love with his boss's daughter, Shikha. Debu is in love with Kiran. Jamuna meets both girls and approves of them. Then her past comes to pay her a nasty visit when she comes face to face with one of her old patrons, Jagmohan, who is Shikha's dad and her brothel owner Telanbai who is Kiran's mother. Struggling to hold her own against these odds, Jamuna must now also come to terms with other life-changing decisions – including death and subsequent deception – decisions that she may end regretting for the rest of her life.

== Cast ==
- Rajendra Kumar as Jagdish Sharma (Special Appearance)
- Asha Parekh as Jamuna
- Vinod Mehra as Raju/Debu (Dual Role)
- Sarika as Shikha
- Nazneen as Kiran
- Nadira as Talenbai
- Kamal Kapoor as Jagmohan
- Jankidas
- Jagdish Raj
- C.S. Dubey

== Music ==
Song	Singer
"Bin Phere Hum Tere"	Kishore Kumar
"Dost Banke Aaye Ho, Dost Banke Hi Rehna"	Mohammed Rafi, Usha Khanna
"Mujhko Inhi Logon Ne"	Asha Bhosle
"Main Kya Maangun"	Asha Bhosle
