= Gora Aur Kala =

- Film poster
- Directed by: Naresh Kumar
- Produced by: Rajkumar Kohli
- Starring: Rajendra Kumar; Hema Malini; Rekha
- Music by: Laxmikant–Pyarelal
- Production company: Shankar Movies
- Distributed by: Nishi Productions
- Release date: 22 December 1972
- Country: India
- Language: Hindi

Gora Aur Kala (transl. The fair and the dark) is a 1972 Indian Hindi-language film, produced by Rajkumar Kohli and directed by Naresh Kumar. The film stars Rajendra Kumar in a double role, Hema Malini, Rekha, Premnath, Prem Chopra, Madan Puri and Jagdeep. The film's music is by Laxmikant–Pyarelal. The movie is a remake of the 1971 Tamil movie Neerum Neruppum, which was based on the 1844 French novella The Corsican Brothers, by Alexandre Dumas.

== Plot ==
Conjoined twin brothers are born in a royal family, but are separated at birth. Though they are twins, one has a blood disorder so his skin discolors and his left arm is paralyzed. Years later they discover each other and unite to free their kingdom from the traitors.

== Cast ==
- Rajendra Kumar as Karan Singh / Kali Singh (Kalua)
- Hema Malini as Rajkumari Anuradha Singh
- Rekha as Phoolwati
- Prem Nath as Prithvi Singh
- Prem Chopra as Shamsher Singh
- Madan Puri as Raja Zohravar Singh (Anuradha's Father)
- Jagdeep as Munna Singh / Chunni Singh
- Sulochana Latkar as Maharani
- Kamal Kapoor as Dilawar Singh
- Sunder as Kotwal Sarju Singh
- Ram Mohan as Hariya
- Rajan Haksar as Randhir Singh
- Dev Kumar as Maharaja
- Kamaldeep as Villager

== Soundtrack ==
Lyrics by Anand Bakshi.

#	Song	Singer
1	"Ek To Mera Mastana Shabaab"	Lata Mangeshkar
2	"Parda Rukh-E-Roshan Se Hata Do"	Lata Mangeshkar
3	"Dheere Dheere Bol, Koi Sun Na Le"	Lata Mangeshkar, Mukesh
4	"Dhoom Mach Gayi Dhoom"	Mohammed Rafi, Usha Mangeshkar
5	"Tere Nain Nashe De Pyaale"	Mohammed Rafi
6	"Ek Na Ek Din Yeh Kahani Banegi"	Mohammed Rafi
