= Rajendra Kumar =

Indian actor (1927–1999)

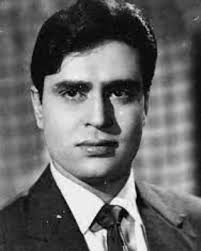
- Kumar in 1959
- Born: Rajendra Kumar Tuli; 20 July 1927; Narowal, Punjab, British India (present-day Punjab, Pakistan)
- Died: 12 July 1999 (aged 71); Mumbai, Maharashtra, India
- Other name: Jubilee Kumar
- Occupations: Actor; producer; director
- Years active: 1949–1998
- Spouse: Shukla Tuli (m. 1954)
- Children: 3, including Kumar Gaurav
- Relatives: Raju Patel (son-in-law); Ramesh Behl (brother-in-law); O. P. Ralhan (brother-in-law)
- Honours: Padma Shri (1970)

Rajendra Kumar (born as Rajendra Kumar Tuli; 20 July 1927 – 12 July 1999) also alternatively known as Rajinder Kumar was an Indian actor who starred in Bollywood films. Starting his career in 1949, he worked in more than 80 films in a career spanning over four decades. Kumar is considered as one of the greatest and most successful actors in Indian cinema. He was popularly known as the Jubilee Kumar during the 1960s, when he consecutively starred in several commercially successful films.

== Early life ==
Rajendra Kumar was born to Lakshmichand Tuli in a Punjabi Hindu Khatri family in Sialkot, in the Punjab province of British India. His grandfather Chajhuram Tuli was a successful military contractor and his father had a textile business in Karachi, Sindh, British India. During the Partition of India, the family had to leave all the land and property behind and move to India. When they came to Bombay, Kumar decided to try his luck in the Hindi film industry. In his initial days, he took up work with director H. S. Rawail as an assistant. For nearly five years, he worked with Rawail as an assistant in films like Patanga, Sagai, Pocket Maar, besides playing uncredited brief roles in them.

== Personal life ==
Kumar married Shukla Behl (27 April 1937 - 8 January 2026) of the Behl family of Hindi films, a sister of Ramesh Behl and Shyam Behl and aunt of their sons Goldie Behl and Ravi Behl. They got married on 5 December 1954. He and Shukla had a son and two daughters. Their son Kumar Gaurav (born 11 July 1956) is a former actor. Their older daughter Dimple (born 31 October 1958) was married to Hollywood film producer Raju Patel. Their younger daughter is Kaajal Tuli (born 18 September 1962) who was renamed Tulsi Chellaram after her marriage. His sister Manorama was married to Indian film producer O. P. Ralhan. His younger brother was film director Naresh Kumar.

Kumar acted with Sunil Dutt and Nargis in the film Mother India (1957) where Sunil Dutt and Rajendra Kumar played sons of Nargis's character. He had a special relationship with Dutt and used to actively participate in campaigning for him, whenever the latter used to contest for elections. Kumar was best friends with Raj Kapoor, so much that his son Kumar Gaurav was engaged to the latter's daughter, Reema. However, their friendship fell apart after their children broke the engagement and Kumar Gaurav married Sunil Dutt and Nargis's daughter Namrata.

Before partition he and his family lived in village Sankhatra near Sialkot. Being brought up in a Muslim neighbourhood, he had made friends with a certain Yousuf Baig who was his dearmost friend. When Baig died in 1988, Kumar officially visited Pakistan to Baig's grave. Baig's father Ramzan Baig was the Principal at Sankhatra High School. While visiting Pakistan in 1988, Kumar mentioned in his interview stating Ramzan Baig was his best Teacher and Yousuf Baig was his best friend. Besides Hindi, Kumar could read and write English and Urdu.

== Career ==
=== 1949–1962: Rise to prominence ===
After beginning his acting career with small roles in Patanga (1949) and Jogan (1950), Rajendra Kumar appeared as a main lead in Devendra Goel's Vachan (1955) alongside Geeta Bali. The film emerged a hit and made him a known face. This was followed by Mehboob Khan's epic drama film Mother India (1957), where he played Nargis's eldest son. It opened to excellent audience response and went on to become an All Time Blockbuster at the box office along with being the highest-grossing film of the 1957. Mother India went on to win several accolades, including the National Film Award for Best Feature Film (Hindi) and was also featured in the book 1001 Movies You Must See Before You Die.

Kumar shot to stardom in 1959 with three back-to-back hits. He first appeared in Vijay Bhatt's romantic musical Goonj Uthi Shehnai. It performed very well at the box office and proved to be a superhit. His next release Chirag Kahan Roshni Kahan was also hit at the box office and Yash Chopra's directional debut, the romantic social drama Dhool Ka Phool, which went on to become a blockbuster as well as one of the highest earners of the year. One of its song "Tu Hindu Banega Na Musalman Banega", sung by Mohammed Rafi was a huge hit. The following year, he co-starred alongside Ashok Kumar and Nanda in B. R. Chopra's courtroom drama Kanoon. The film had no songs, however, it became a hit and went on to win National Film Award for Best Feature Film (Hindi).

1961 was the best year of Kumar's career with many successes. His first release, the drama film Zindagi aur Khwab opposite Meena Kumari was a critical and commercial hit. He then appeared in Mohan Kumar's Aas Ka Panchhi opposite Vyjayanthimala and S. S. Vasan's Gharana opposite Asha Parekh, both of which were blockbusters. This was followed by another major hit in Sasural and a moderate success in Pyaar Ka Saagar.

=== 1963–1968: Superstardom ===
In 1963, Kumar's first release was C. V. Sridhar's romantic drama Dil Ek Mandir co-starring Raaj Kumar and Meena Kumari. The film opened to highly positive response from critics and emerged as a blockbuster with Kumar receiving his first nomination in the Filmfare Award for Best Actor category. The huge success of Dil Ek Mandir was followed by a hit in O. P. Ralhan's Gehra Daag. His last release of the year was H. S. Rawail's Muslim social Mere Mehboob which also had Ashok Kumar and Sadhana in the main lead. The film topped the box office chart in 1963 and was given the verdict of All Time Blockbuster by the end of its run. Its soundtrack composed by Naushad dominated the musical charts and was the second best-selling Hindi film album of the 1960s.

With continuous flow of hits from 1959 onwards and many of his films running for a minimum 25 weeks (silver jubilee), Kumar earned the sobriquet of Jubilee Kumar and emerged as a Superstar.

In 1964, he delivered three major successes. His first release that year was Mohan Kumar's Ayee Milan Ki Bela co-starring Saira Banu and Dharmendra. It continued the success streak of Kumar and proved to be a superhit with receiving a nomination for the Filmfare Award for Best Actor. This was followed by Raj Kapoor's magnum opus Sangam opposite Vyjayanthimala. It received widespread acclaim, with high praise for its novel concept, direction, dialogue, costumes and performances of the cast, and is widely considered as Hindi cinema's greatest love triangle. At the box office, it emerged as an All Time Blockbuster and the second highest-grossing film of the 1960s behind Mughal-E-Azam. The music of Sangam was a huge chartbuster with songs which became popular like "Dost Dost Na Raha", "Har Dil Jo Pyaar Karega", "Bol Radha Bol", "Yeh Mera Prem Patra" and emerged as the best-selling Hindi film album of the 1960s. The mega success of Ayee Milan Ki Bela and Sangam was followed by another superhit in Ramanand Sagar's second directional venture Zindagi. The next year, Kumar reunited with Ramanand Sagar for the romantic drama Arzoo opposite Sadhana. The film did very well both critically and commercially, eventually became a blockbuster as well as one of the highest-grossing films of 1965. Owing to his subtle performance of a handicapped, Kumar received his third nomination for Filmfare Award for Best Actor which also turned out to be his last.

In 1966, he starred in T. Prakash Rao's big-budget swashbuckler Ruritanian romance Suraj. The film backed up with superhit songs, including ""Baharon Phool Barsao", sung by Rafi and "Titli Udi Ud Jo Chali", a solo by Sharda, went on to become a massive blockbuster and Kumar's sixth consecutive hit. The following year, however, his successful run ended, with both of his releases, Aman and Palki, proving to be critical and commercial failures. In 1968, he appeared in another of C. V. Sridhar's romantic drama Saathi and Lekh Tandon's romantic comedy Jhuk Gaya Aasman. Saathi despite featuring some of the biggest stars of the time did average business, while Jhuk Gaya Aasman ended up as a box office flop upon release, but did well in re-runs later and attained cult status owing to its unique storyline and music.

=== 1969–1980: Further works as a lead ===
In 1969, Rajesh Khanna gained nationwide success with his blockbusters Aradhana and Do Raaste. With Khanna's rise, Kumar's career began to lose some of its earlier momentum. In 1969, he had three releases - Anjaana, Shatranj, Talash. Anjaana and Talash were successful but Shatranj didn't do well at the box office.

In 1970, Kumar continued to deliver hits in Ramanand Sagar's Geet opposite Mala Sinha and his brother Naresh Kumar's Ganwaar opposite Vyjayanthimala. His other releases, including C. V. Sridhar's Dharti and Raj Kapoor's Mera Naam Joker, in which he played a small role, failed commercially. The next year, his sole release and final collaboration with Mohan Kumar took place for the romantic drama Aap Aye Bahaar Ayee opposite Sadhana and Prem Chopra. The film backed up with melodious songs composed by Laxmikant–Pyarelal like "Mujhe Teri Mohabbat Ka Sahara", "Aap Aye Bahaar Ayee" and "Tumko Bhi To Aisa Kuchh Hota", were box office hit.

In 1972, Kumar appeared alongside Hema Malini and Rekha in another of Naresh Kumar's directional venture, the action drama Gora Aur Kala. A remake of Tamil mega hit Neerum Neruppum, was successful venture in Hindi and emerged a blockbuster as well as the fifth highest-grossing film of the year. He then collaborated with Dharmendra and Mala Sinha for Ramanand Sagar's war action film Lalkar. Lalkar was one of the costliest films of its time, but managed to do average at the box office. Following a brief hiatus, Kumar appeared in Adurthi Subba Rao's Sunehra Sansar (1975) and Naresh Kumar's Do Jasoos (1975), both of which performed well commercially. In the late-1970s, he starred in moderately successful films, such as Daku Aur Mahatma (1977), Shirdi Ke Sai Baba (1977), Sone Ka Dil Lohe Ke Haath (1978), Aahuti (1978) and Bin Phere Hum Tere (1979), with exception being Saawan Kumar Tak's hit drama film Saajan Bina Suhagan (1978), co-starring Nutan and Vinod Mehra.

=== 1981–1993: Later career ===
In 1981, Rajendra Kumar launched and acted alongside his son Kumar Gaurav in the romantic musical Love Story. The film was a huge blockbuster and one of the biggest hits of the year. Its soundtrack composed by R. D. Burman was highly successful and the second best-selling Hindi film album of the 1980s. But Love Story proved to be the only huge successful film of his son's career. Afterwards, Kumar did a guest appearance in another film with his son Star (1982) and took up supporting roles in few films like Lovers (1983), Main Tere Liye (1988), Clerk (1989) but none of them were successful.

In 1993, Kumar gave his last appearance in Singeetam Srinivasa Rao's action drama Phool, which he also produced. It opened to negative response from critics and did not perform well commercially.

== Death ==
Kumar refused to take any medication as he was dealing with cancer, he died of heart attack at the age of 71 on 12 July 1999, just a day after his son's 43rd birthday and just 8 days before his 72nd birthday.

The then Prime minister Atal Bihari Vajpayee condoled his death and expressed profound grief. I & B Minister Pramod Mahajan said "The world of cinema has become poorer by his death." State minister for I & B, Mukhtar Abbas Naqvi, said, "The death of the veteran actor, who swayed the emotions of the cinegoers, is a great loss to the industry".

== Honours and recognitions ==
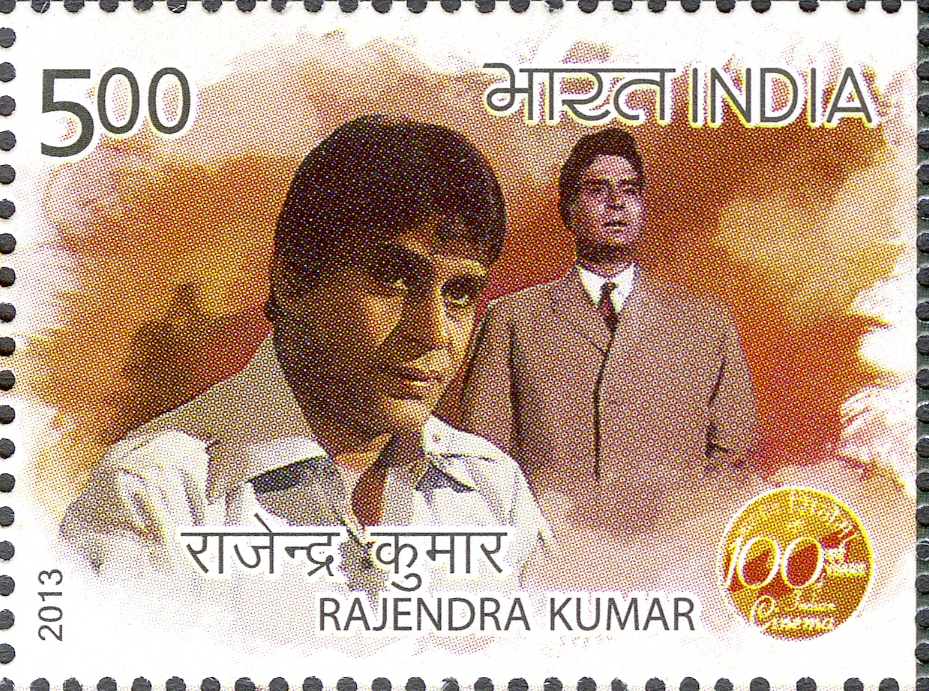
Kumar's stamp published in 2013

- Honoured with Padma Shri in 1970.
- He was also conferred with Justice of Peace honour and served as Honorary Magistrate.
- He was awarded the National Honour by late Pt. Jawaharlal Nehru simultaneously for Kanoon (Hindi) and Mehndi Rang Lagyo (Gujarati film).
- He received a special Lal Bahadur Shastri National Award and was associated with several charity schemes.

== Legacy ==
Kumar is regarded as one of the greatest actors of Hindi cinema. Known for his acting and mannerism, he earned the nickname of Jubilee Kumar as five or six of his films used to run simultaneously for 25 weeks. Despite giving back-to-back massive hits, Kumar never won any Filmfare Award. One of the highest paid actors from the late-1950s to 1960s, Kumar appeared in Box Office India's "Top Actors" list seven times, (1961, 1963–1968). He topped the list six times (1963–1968).

Dinesh Raheja of Rediff.com noted that Rajendra Kumar "fitted the bill, both literally and figuratively, perfectly". His ability to charm women in musical romances with his "bashful smile" that invariably reached his lovelorn eyes. His "gestural style of acting" became a signature, as did "his quivering lips and emotion-laden voice". In 2020, Author Seema Sonik Alimchand published a book named Jubilee Kumar - The Life and Times of Superstar based on Kumar's life journey. Devdan Mitra said, "For much of the 60s, Rajendra Kumar strode the Hindi film world like a colossus. Therefore, it is surprising that not much has been written about the man whose film career lasted close to 45 years as an actor and a producer and whose life’s journey reflected the trials and tribulations of the generation affected by the ravages of Partition. This book on Kumar attempts to fill the void." Sunil Dutt admired Kumar as a person by saying, "Even though Rajendra Kumar did not win any award throughout his career, he was one of the most genuine human beings I have ever encountered. When I was struggling with the troubles related to the arrest of my son Sanjay Dutt and my house was repeatedly being searched by means of numerous police raids, Rajendra Kumar was the one who came to my rescue by staying at my house and ensuring that raids were conducted using due procedures, false evidences were not planted in the house and valuables were not stolen." Disha Bagchi of ThePrint called him "Bollywood's Jubilee King" and wrote that Bollywood could never repay the kindness when Kumar's career began to plateau in the 1970s. He focused his energies on building a successful film career for his son. But, he will be remembered for "his powerful performances, kind demeanor and generosity".

In 2022, he was placed in Outlook India's "75 Best Bollywood Actors" list.

== Filmography ==
=== As actor ===
Films as actor
Year	Film	Role	Notes
1949	Patanga	Sohan	Debut film Brief role (uncredited) Also assistant director (credited)
1950	Jogan	Raj	
1954	Mastana	Man in sunglasses who lends a half smoked cigarette to Mastana (Motilal) in the opening scene	Walk-on part (uncredited) Also assistant director (credited)
1955	Vachan	Kishore	First lead role
1956	Toofan Aur Deeya	Satish Sharma (Masterji)	
1956	Aawaz	Ashok	
1956	Pocket Maar	Mukhiram Bairagi	Brief role (Voice dubbed; uncredited) Also assistant director (credited)
1957	Mother India	Ramu	
1957	Ek Jhalak		
1957	Duniya Rang Rangeeli	Shyam	
1958	Devar Bhabhi	Ramu	
1958	Ghar Sansar	Deepak	
1958	Khazanchi	Harish Mohan	
1958	Talaq	Ravi Shankar Chaubey	
1959	Chirag Kahan Roshni Kahan	Dr. Anand	
1959	Dhool Ka Phool	Mahesh Kapoor	
1959	Do Behnen	Ramesh	
1959	Goonj Uthi Shehnai	Kishan	
1959	Santan	Mohanlal Verma	
1960	Kanoon	Kailash Khanna	
1960	Maa Baap	Raj Kumar 'Raju'	
1960	Mehndi Rang Lagyo	Anil	Gujarati Film
1960	Patang	Dr. Rajan	
1960	Kala Bazar	(Himself)	Cameo as one of the stars at the premiere of Mother India (1957) also starring him, at Maratha Mandir
1961	Zindagi Aur Khwab	Manoj	
1961	Aas Ka Panchhi	Rajan Khanna (Raju)	
1961	Dharmputra	Party leader	Special Appearance
1961	Amar Rahe Yeh Pyar	Iqbal Hussain	
1961	Gharana	Kamal	
1961	Pyaar Ka Saagar	Kishan Chand Gupta	
1961	Sasural	Shekhar	
1961	Sanjog		Guest Appearance
1963	Akeli Mat Jaiyo	Amardeep and Rajinder Kumar	Double role
1963	Dil Ek Mandir	Dr. Dharmesh	Nominated – Filmfare Award for Best Actor
1963	Gehra Daag	Shankar	
1963	Hamrahi	Shekhar	
1963	Mere Mehboob	Anwar Hussain Anwar	
1964	Sangam	Gopal Verma	Nominated – Filmfare Award for Best Supporting Actor
1964	Ayee Milan Ki Bela	Shyam	Nominated – Filmfare Award for Best Actor
1964	Zindagi	Rajendra (Rajan)	
1965	Arzoo	Gopal alias Sarju	Nominated – Filmfare Award for Best Actor
1966	Suraj	Suraj Singh	
1967	Palki	Naseem Baig	
1967	Aman	Dr. Gautamdas	
1968	Saathi	Ravi	
1968	Jhuk Gaya Aasman	Sanjay Kumar and Tarun Kumar 'Battu' 'Pappu' Saxena (double roles)	
1969	Anjaana	Raju	
1969	Shatranj	Vijay (Jay) alias Shinraaz	
1969	Talash	Raj Kumar (Raju)	
1970	Mera Naam Joker	Kumar	
1970	Geet	Suraj Kumar (Sarju)	
1970	Ganwaar	Gopal Rai alias Garibdas	
1970	Dharti	Bharat	
1971	Aap Aye Bahaar Ayee	Rohit Kumar Verma	
1972	Tangewala	Raju / Rai Bahadur Kishandas / Dilbahadur Khan	
1972	Gora Aur Kala	Karan Singh & Kali Singh (Kalua)	Double Role
1972	Gaon Hamara Shaher Tumhara	Brij Bhushan (Birju)	
1972	Aan Baan	Suraj	
1972	Lalkaar	Rajan Kapoor	
1974	Dukh Bhanjan Tera Naam	Boatsman	
1974	Do Sher	Shera	Punjabi film
1975	Do Jasoos	Karam Chand	
1975	Rani Aur Lalpari	Rani's Father	
1975	Sunehra Sansar	Chandrashekhar	
1975	Teri Meri Ik Jindri	Jaggar Singh Fauji	Special Appearance
1976	Mazdoor Zindabaad	Ram Singh	
1977	Daku Aur Mahatma	Laxman Singh/Dilawar Singh	
1977	Shirdi Ke Sai Baba	Doctor (Pooja's Husband)	
1978	Sone Ka Dil Lohe Ke Haath	Shankar	
1978	Aahuti	Ram Prasad (Rocky)	
1978	Saajan Bina Suhagan	Raj Kumar	
1979	Bin Phere Hum Tere	Jagdish Sharma	
1980	Gunehgaar	Madan	
1980	Badla Aur Balidan	Avinash Kumar	
1980	Dhan Daulat	Raj Saxena	
1980	Oh Bewafa	R. K.	
1980	Saajan Ki Saheli	Avinash Kumar	
1981	Yeh Rishta Na Tootay	Vijay Kumar	
1981	Love Story	Vijay Mehra	
1982	Rustom	J. D. Mehta	
1983	Lovers	Christian Priest	
1988	Main Tere Liye	Shiva	
1989	Clerk	Rahim U. Khan	
1991	Insaaf Ka Khoon	Judge Kumar	
1993	Phool	Dharamraj	Also Producer

TV show
Year	Film	Role	Channel	Notes
1995	Andaz		Zee TV	one episode
1995	Vansh		Zee TV	RK Films

=== Producer ===
Films as producer
Year	Film	Director	Notes
1970	The Train	Ravikant Nagaich	
1981	Love Story	Rahul Rawail	
1983	Lovers	Bharathiraja	
1986	Naam	Mahesh Bhatt	
1991	Jurrat	David Dhawan	Also editor
1993	Phool	Singeetam Srinivasa Rao	
1994	The Jungle Book	Stephen Sommers	(co-executive producer)

=== Presenter ===
- The Train (1970)
- Ganwaar (1970)
- Talash (1969)
- Phool Aur Patthar (1966)

=== Assistant Director ===
- Patanga (1949)
- Sagai (1951) credited as Rajee
- Saqi (1952) credited as Rajendra
- Shagufa (1953)
- Mastana (1954) credited as Rajinder
- Pocket Maar (1956) credited as Rajinder

=== Thanks ===
- Mera Naam Joker (1970) (acknowledgment) (credited as Rajender Kumar)

=== Self ===
- Raj Kapoor (1987) as Himself (during funeral)
- Star (1982) as Himself (Guest Appearance)
- Shrimanji (1968) as Himself
- Kala Bazar (1960) as Himself

=== Archive footage ===
- Film Hi Film (1983) in which a few footages of his shelved colour film Sasta Khoon Mehngha Pani (1964) produced and directed by K. Asif and starring Kumar, Saira Banu and Jayant were used.
