= Dhruva Chatterjee =

Indian screenwriter

- Occupations: Writer, screenwriter
- Writing career
- Genres: Drama, suspense, thriller

Dhruva Chatterjee or Dhruv Chatterjee was a noted writer and screenwriter of Hindi cinema in the 1960s and 1970s. Memorable movies written and scripted by him include Chirag Kahan Roshni Kahan (1960), Hariyali Aur Rasta (1962), Gehra Daag (1963), Woh Kaun Thi? (1964), Kohra (1964), Gumnaam (1965), Chor Machaye Shor (1974), Dus Numbri (1976) and Fakira (1976). He was also nominated for the Filmfare Award for Best Story in 1960, for Chirag Kahan Roshni Kahan (1959).

== Filmography ==
- Shri Chaitanya Mahaprabhu (screenplay) (1953)
- Ferry (story) (1954)
- Chirag Kahan Roshni Kahan (1959)
- Pyaar Ka Saagar (revised screenplay) (1961)
- Hariyali Aur Rasta (screenplay / story) (1962)
- Bees Saal Baad (story) (1962)
- Nartaki (1963 film) (screenplay / story)
- Gehra Daag (writer) (1963)
- Dulha Dulhan (story) (1964)
- Kohra (screenplay) (1964)
- Woh Kaun Thi? (screenplay/story) (1964)
- Sanjh Aur Savera (story and screenplay) (1964)
- Dulha Dulhan (story) (1964)
- Gumnaam (screenplay) (1965)
- Bedaag (screenplay / story) (1965)
- Shikar (dialogue) (1968)
- Intaquam (screenplay) (1969)
- Ganwaar (screenplay) (1970)
- Kab? Kyoon? Aur Kahan? (screenplay) (1970)
- Paise Ki Gudiya (story and screenplay) (1974)
- Jurm Aur Sazaa (screenplay / story) (1974)
- Chor Machaye Shor (story) (1974)
- Asliyat (story) (1974)
- Dus Numbri (screenplay) (1976)
- Fakira (screenplay) (1976)
- Mukti (screenplay / story) (1977)
- Professor Pyarelal (screenplay) (1981)
