= Shatranj (1969 film) =

1969 film by S. S. Vasan

- Poster
- Directed by: S. S. Vasan
- Produced by: S. S. Vasan; N. N. Sippy
- Starring: Rajendra Kumar; Waheeda Rehman
- Music by: Shankar–Jaikishan
- Production company: Gemini Studios
- Release date: 1969
- Country: India
- Language: Hindi

Shatranj (transl. Chess) is a 1969 Indian Hindi-language spy thriller film co-produced and directed by S. S. Vasan. His final directorial venture, it stars Rajendra Kumar and Waheeda Rehman, with Mehmood, Madan Puri, Shashikala, Helen, Achala Sachdev, Manmohan Krishna and Agha in pivotal roles.

== Plot ==
Sharda has been married to Thakur for several years, and both have a daughter: Meena. Sharda and Meena suddenly decide to leave India and settle down in a communist country, without letting Thakur know. Concerned about them, Thakur hires Jai, a spy, to locate them, and bring them back if possible. Jai agrees and soon arrives in that country, which is ruled by a military general who has not shown his face to anyone. Jai assumes the identity of Shinraaz, goes around trying to locate the two women, and finds Meena, who works as a dancer in a hotel. Jai eventually learns what brought Meena and her mother to this country, and why they both are not willing to return to India.

== Cast ==
- Rajendra Kumar as Jay / Vijay / Shinraz
- Waheeda Rehman as Meena
- Mehmood as Ameer
- Madan Puri as Comrade Chang
- Shashikala as Suzy
- Helen as Salma
- Achala Sachdev as Sharda
- Manmohan Krishna as Thakur
- Agha as Comrade Lee Jung

== Production ==
Shatranj was the final film directed by S. S. Vasan. He co-produced the film with N. N. Sippy under Gemini Studios. Madan Puri's character was modelled after the fictional character Fu Manchu. The film was colourised using Eastmancolor.

== Soundtrack ==
The music was composed by the duo Shankar–Jaikishan. Hasrat Jaipuri, S. H. Bihari, Indeevar and Kiran Kalyani were the lyricists.

Track listing
No.	Title	Singer(s)	Length
1.	"Na Socha Na Samjha Na Seekha"	Asha Bhosle
2.	"Aao Tumhen Pyar Karna Seekha Doon"	Mohammed Rafi
3.	"Badli Mein Chhupe Chand Ne"	Lata Mangeshkar, Hemant Kumar
4.	"Shatranj Ki Chaal Hai Hamari"	Mohammed Rafi
5.	"Jungle Mein Mor Nacha Kisne Dekha"	Lata Mangeshkar
6.	"Samjho Zara Kahti Hai Kya"	Mohammed Rafi, Asha Bhosle
7.	"Batkamma Batkamma ekkaDa pOtAv raa"	Mohammed Rafi, Sharda Rajan Iyengar
8.	"Ajnabee Hoon Main Is Jahan Mein"	Lata Mangeshkar
9.	"Tumhen Agar Main Apna Saathi"	Mohammed Rafi, Asha Bhosle

== Release and reception ==
Shatranj was an "anti-China movie", and theatres screening the film in West Bengal were burnt down by Communist revolutionaries. It was later forcibly removed from exhibition by the Government of that state. In Bathinda, Naxalites tried to blow up the theatre where the film was being screened, but the police successfully removed the bomb before it could do any damage. In a review dated 29 March 1969, the magazine Thought wrote, "Watching a game of shatranj, one needs some intelligence and common sense to follow the opponents' moves and countermoves. Watching Shatranj, the film, one has to suspend both intellect and [judgement]." The film was commercially successful but, according to Vasan's son Balan, "not to the extent expected by the maker".
