= Yaar Mera =

- Poster
- Directed by: Atma Ram
- Written by: Abrar Alvi (dialogues)
- Screenplay by: Abrar Alvi
- Story by: Anand Dutta
- Produced by: Rajaram & Satish Wagle
- Starring: Jeetendra; Rakhee Gulzar
- Cinematography: K.G. Prabhakar
- Edited by: Y.G. Chowhan
- Music by: Shankar Jaikishan
- Production company: R.S.Productions
- Release date: 11 November 1972
- Running time: 138 minutes
- Country: India
- Language: Hindi

Yaar Mera (transl. My Friend) is a 1972 Indian Hindi-language drama film, produced by Rajaram and Satish Wagle under the R.S.Productions banner, and directed by Atma Ram. It stars Jeetendra and Rakhee Gulzar, with music composed by Shankar Jaikishan.

== Plot ==
Shyam called him "Yaar Mera" his greatest friend! He had implicit faith in him, all of the city beckoned him. Leaving behind his poor mother and younger sister in the village, Shyam had virtually descended on the big city in search of an honest job but having failed to procure one he adopted a most devil-may-care attitude. he could not be careless about the clutches of the law. So he has broken the law, grabbed, robbed and plundered with impunity, because he was so sure his Supreme Friend was always there to save him from any calamity. And Shyam did get away with all his escapades. Swiftly he rose from rags to riches and on his way managed to get a very pretty girl also Sarla, knew Shyam as Kishan. After all, one has to have aliases when on is playing with the law, of course, Sarla didn't know about his turncoat ways. She genuinely believed that her Kishan was a perfect gentleman and Shyam remained confident that she would never be able to learn the truth about him-his Supreme Friend would see to that and also enjoyed total devotion from Shyam's near and dear ones but with a difference! For instance, Shyam's mother and Sarla, both believed that the Supreme Friend's powers were unquestionable, but they also thought that he could never countenance anything evil. Shyam had different ideas, his many hair-breadth escapes after doing evil had convinced him that his `Yaar would countenance anything which he did!

== Cast ==
- Jeetendra as Shyam
- Rakhee Gulzar as Sarla
- Jayant as Jagat Dada (Shyam's father)
- Manmohan as Manmohan
- Nana Palsikar as Dinanath
- Paintal as Pascal
- Murad as Nawab of Nawabganj
- Jagdish Raj as Jailor
- Achala Sachdev as Shyam's mother
- Nazima as Gullo
- Helen as Rosy
- Ruby Mayer
- Mona as Julie

== Soundtrack ==
#	Title	Singer(s)
1	"Dil Ki Kitaab Kori Hai"	Mohammed Rafi, Suman Kalyanpur
2	"Dar Lage To Gana Ga"	Mohammed Rafi
3	"Husn Walo Ke Panje"	Asha Bhosle
4	"Hai Kuch Aise Ada"	Mohammed Rafi
5	"Hari Om Hari Om"	Manna Dey
