= Mazdoor Zindabaad =

- Directed by: Naresh Kumar
- Written by: Naresh Kumar
- Produced by: Naresh Kumar
- Music by: Usha Khanna
- Release date: 1976
- Country: India
- Language: Hindi

Mazdoor Zindabaad is a 1976 Bollywood film directed by Naresh Kumar.

== Cast ==
- Randhir Kapoor as Randhir
- Parveen Babi as Kamla
- Suhail as Master Suhail
- Parijat as Baby Parijat
- Ajay as Master Ajay
- Ashok Kapoor as Ashok
- Rajendra Kumar as Ram Singh
- Mala Sinha as Sita Singh
- Indira Bansal as Mrs. Hansraj
- Manmohan Krishna as Chunilal
- Moolchand as Sethji

== Soundtrack ==
1. "Meri Munni Rani Soja, Tujhko Sulane Raat Aayi" – K. J. Yesudas
2. "Mazdoor Zindabad, Kaam Ki Puja Karne Wale" – Mohammed Rafi
3. "Bhookh Hi Bhookh Hai, Insaan Se HewaanKa Dil" – Mohammed Rafi
4. "Humko Paisa Na Do, Hum Bikhari Nahi" – Anupama Deshpande, Asha Bhosle
5. "Do Bhai Akele Rah Gaye" – Shailendra Singh
6. "Yeh Aaj Ka Bharat Hai" – Asha Bhosle, Jaspal Singh
