= Neerum Neruppum =

1971 film by P. Neelakantan

- Theatrical release poster
- Directed by: P. Neelakantan
- Written by: R. K. Shamugam (dialogues)
- Screenplay by: Acharya
- Produced by: Tehmina D.Tehrani; Perviz D.Tehrani
- Starring: M. G. Ramachandran; Jayalalithaa; S. A. Ashokan; R. S. Manohar
- Cinematography: V. Ramamoorthy
- Edited by: M. Umanath
- Music by: M. S. Viswanathan
- Production company: Neo Manijeh Cine Productions
- Release date: 18 October 1971
- Country: India
- Language: Tamil

Neerum Neruppum (transl. Water and Fire) is a 1971 Indian Tamil-language swashbuckler film directed by P. Neelakantan, starring M. G. Ramachandran and Jayalalithaa, with R. S. Manohar, Thengai Srinivasan among others. The storyline is based on the 1844 French novella The Corsican Brothers by Alexandre Dumas. It was a re-make of a successful 'Apoorva Sahothararkal' (1949) movie, produced by Gemini Studios, starring M.K. Radha and P. Bhanumathi. Neerum Neruppum was released on 18 October 1971. The film was remade in Hindi as Gora Aur Kala.

== Plot ==
The story is about twin princes Manivannan and Karikalan who seek to avenge their father's death at hands of King Marthandan. The twins are separated. But Karikalan can feel whatever feelings Manivannan is in. Karikalan wanted to avenge those people who have set fire to his castle. One of them is brought up by Arunakiri while the other is brought up by Marudhu. One is educated preferring to use brains over brawns while the other is an adept fighter. They both plan and execute the downfall of Marthandan.

== Cast ==
Actor	Role
M. G. Ramachandran	Twins Princes Manivannan (Neerum) and Karikalan (Neruppum)
Jayalalithaa	Kanchana
S. A. Ashokan	The King Marthandan
R. S. Manohar	The royal bodyguard Marudhu
T. K. Bhagavathi	The doctor Arunakiri
C. L. Anandan	Jambhu, the right-hand man of Marthadhan
Vijayachandrika	
Thengai Srinivasan	Navarassam, the royal make-up man of Marthadhan
Manorama	Ammuni
Jothilakshmi	Kanaga Vallee, the favourite of Marthadhan
G. Sakunthala	The queen Karpagam, mother of the twins
Shanmugasundari	Prince Manivannan's foster mom
S. V. Ramadas	The king Mahendhar Boopadhi, father of the twins
V. S. Raghavan	The jeweler Nala, the father of Kanchana
K. Nadarajan	Prince Manivannan's foster dad
Karikol Raju	Guard
Usilai Mani	Guard

The casting is established according to the original order of the credits of opening of the movie, except those not mentioned.

== Production ==
The film was prominently shot at Gemini Studios. K. P. Ramakrishnan served as a stunt double for Ramachandran. The song "Viruntho Nalla Virunthu", performed by Jayalalithaa, was inspired by the song "Laddu Laddu Mittai Venumaa", featuring P. Bhanumathi in the film Apoorva Sagodharargal (1949 film).

== Soundtrack ==
Track listing
No.	Title	Lyrics	Singer(s)	Length
1.	"Kanni Oruthi"	Vaali	T. M. Soundararajan, P. Susheela	3:27
2.	"Kadavul Vazhthuppaadum"	Vaali	T. M. Soundararajan	3:12
3.	"Kattu Mella Kattu"	Vaali	L. R. Eswari	3:24
4.	"Konduva Innum"	Vaali	S. Janaki	3:16
5.	"Maalai Nera Thendral"	Vaali	P. Susheela, S. P. Balasubrahmanyam	4:26
6.	"Viruntho Nalla Virunthu"	Vaali, Vayalar Ramavarma, Kosaraju & Vijaya Narasimha	L. R. Eswari, K. Veeramani, Sadhan, Nageswara Rao, T. A. Modhi & J. V. Raghavalu	6:53

== Reception ==
Critical and popular reception for this movie was rather negative. Thus, this movie became an exception to other MGR movies, in which he had played two roles.
