= Aamne Samne (1982 film) =

1982 film by Ashim Samanta

- Vinyl Disc Cover
- Directed by: Ashim Samanta
- Produced by: Shakti Samanta
- Starring: Mithun Chakraborty; Bindiya Goswami
- Cinematography: Nando Bhattacharya
- Music by: R. D. Burman
- Release date: 29 January 1982
- Running time: 135 minutes
- Country: India
- Language: Hindi

Aarale Aabdaale (in Bengali) or Amne Samne (in Hindi) is a 1982 Indian bilingual action thriller film directed by debutante Ashim Samanta and starring Mithun Chakraborty in a dual role, alongside Bindiya Goswami, Aarti Gupta Surendranath, Dinesh Thakur, Kamal Kapoor and Leela Mishra in important roles. This film's plot resembles the 1970 film Sachaa Jhutha. Amne Samne (1982) was a hit at the box office and created a strong base and hype for the then 2 upcoming movies of Mithun Chakraborty Taqdeer Ka Badshah (1982) and the legendary Disco Dancer (1982) both directed by Babbar Subhash.

== Plot ==
Gopi is a simple-minded villager who travels to Mumbai looking for a job. He is approached by some men who mistake him for Johnny. Johnny is a criminal who works for the underworld don Supremo, and is also a stage performer by day to cover up his criminal activities. When he meets his lookalike, Johnny decides to use him as a fall guy in case the police discover who he is. Gopi is trained into becoming Johnny to convincingly impersonate him, unknowingly becoming an accomplice to Johnny's crimes. When the police discover Johnny has stolen valuable statues, Gopi is blamed and must prove his innocence to everyone.

== Cast ==
- Mithun Chakraborty as Gopi / Johnny (Dual Role)
- Bindiya Goswami as CBI Inspector Jyoti
- Aarti Gupta Surendranath as Rita
- Leela Mishra as Gopi's Grandmother
- Kamal Kapoor as Supremo
- Dinesh Thakur as CBI Ashraf Khan
- Jagdish Raj as Police Commissioner
- Monty
- Sudhir as Supremo Assistant
- Mac Mohan as Johnny Goon
- Madhu Malini as Rekha
- Master Ashoo as Johnny Son
- Anirudh Agarwal as Gurnam

== Soundtrack ==
Song	Singer
"Tu Main Ban Gaya"	Kishore Kumar
"Maine Kaha Tha, Main Aaunga"	Kishore Kumar
"Ae Meri Awaaz Ke Doston"	Amit Kumar
"Daddy Tum Aunty Se Pyar Karte Ho, Lekin Mujhse Darte Ho"	R. D. Burman, Vanita Mishra
"Oonchi Neechi Palki"	Asha Bhosle
"Gale Mil Lo, O Deewanon"	Asha Bhosle
