= Sunder (actor) =

Indian actor (1908–1992)

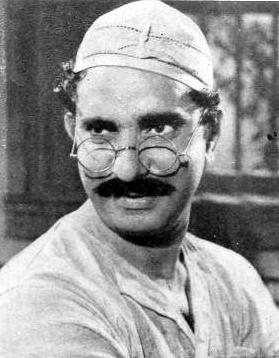
- Sunder in the 1948 film Shadi ke Baad
- Born: Sunder Singh; 14 March 1908; Lahore, British India
- Died: 5 March 1992 (aged 83); Mumbai, India
- Other name: Sundar
- Occupation: Actor
- Known for: Indian Cinema

Sunder Singh (14 March 1908 – 5 March 1992), known mononymously as Sunder, was an Indian actor. In some of his earlier movies, his screen name was given as Sundar Lall. He was a noted Indian film actor between the 1930s and 1980s. He acted in many Hindi and Punjabi language films in his career as a hero or supporting roles as a comedian.

== Filmography ==
He acted in more than 436 films. He has also sung some songs in Hindi films like 'Mastaana-1954', 'Lal quilla' and 'Upkaar', and in some Punjabi films. Some of his most noted films follow:

=== Hindi ===
- Imperial Mail (1938)
- Veer Kesari (1938)
- Sipahi (1941)
- Dorangia Daku (1940)
- Khamoshi (1942)
- Sabyasachi (1948)
- Shadi Ke Baad (1948)
- Albela (1951)
- Johari (1951)
- Jugni (1953) Punjabi Movie
- Dekh Kabira Roya (1957)
- Chandu (1958)
- Solva Saal (1958)
- Insan Jaag Utha (1959)
- Pilpili Saheb (1954)
- Shravan Kumar (1960) as Champak
- Khiladi (1961)
- Ayee Milan Ki Bela (1964)
- Accident (1965)
- Phool Aur Patthar (1966)
- Upkar (1967)
- Badrinath Yatra (1967) as Gangu
- Sadhu Aur Shaitaan (1968) as Pandit
- Padosan (1968) as Pandit
- Aabroo (1968) as Whisky Rani's (Tun Tun) husband
- Aya Sawan Jhoom Ke (1969) as Dr Yudhvir Singh
- Doli (1969)
- Anjaana (1969)
- Yakeen (1969)
- Bandhan (1969)
- Bachpan (1970)
- Aan Milo Sajna (1970) as Majnaram
- Johar Mehmood in Hong Kong (1971) as Pandit (Cameo Role)
- Mehboob Ki Mehndi (1971)
- Banphool (1971)... Panchilal
- Gaon Hamara Shaher Tumhara (1972) as Sunder, Paanwala
- Apna Desh (1972)
- Aan Baan (1972)
- Gora Aur Kala (1972) as Kotwal Sarju Singh
- Naya Din Nai Raat (1974) as Police Constable
- Pratigya (1975) as Barber Dinapur Resident
- Sunehra Sansar (1975) as Bhanwarlal
- Charas (1976 film) as Police Constable Pandu
- Saheb Bahadur (1977) as Hotel Manager
- Chacha Bhatija (1978) as Police Inspector
- Damaad(1978) as Dr Chatterjee
- Muqaddar Ka Sikander (1978) as Bus Conductor (Special Appearance)
- Aasha (1980 film) as Ramlagan, Dhaba Owner
- Naseeb(1981) as Hotel Cook (Cameo Role)
- Sannata (1981) as Watchman
- Biwi-O-Biwi (1981) as Girdhari
- Naram Garam (1981)
- Dard Ka Rishta (1982) as Laundryman
- Betaab (1983)
- Humse Naa Jeeta Koi (1983)
- Sharaabi (1984) as Mr Khaitaan, Cement King
- Arjun (1985) as Tea Vendor
- Paththar (1985) as Shaadi Lal
- Mohabbat (1985 film) as Pandit
- Maa Kasam (1985) as Bhola Ram
- Aap Ke Saath (1986) as Pareshan Singh, Servant
- Dacait (1987) as Kashiram Kaka
- Bahurani (1989) as Driver Bihari Lal

=== Punjabi ===
- Vilayati Babu (1981) as Lamberdar
- Chann Pardesi (1981) as Hawaldaar
- Choran Noo Mor (1980)
- Takkra (1976)
- Yamla Jatt (1976)
- Bhakti Me Shakti (1974)
- Dulla Bhatti (1966)
- Yamla Jatt (1964)
- Banto with Ashok Kumar, Pardeep Kumar, Nishi, Diljit, Majnu, Kartar Singh (1962)
- Jija Ji (1961)
- Chaudhary Karnail Singh as fattu (1960)
- Do Lachhian (1960)
- Bhangra (1959) as Sunder
- Madari (1950)
- Lara Lappa (1953)
- Jugni (1952)
- Chhai (1950) as Sunder
- Sassi Punnu (1939) released on Friday, 23 June 1939(Punjabi - Made in Calcutta) Director:by Dawood Chand
