= Aan Baan =

1972 film

- Directed by: Prakash Mehra
- Starring: Rajendra Kumar; Raakhee
- Music by: Shankar Jaikishan
- Release date: 1972
- Country: India
- Language: Hindi

Aan Baan is a 1972 Bollywood drama film directed by Prakash Mehra. The film stars Rajendra Kumar and Raakhee.

== Plot summary ==
Raja Bahadur rules his region, although fully aware that his days as King are numbered. Nevertheless, he indulges in women, alcohol, and high-living - most of which is through borrowed money, with the creditors threatening to take him to court. He even has an affair with prostitute named Dulari, who he refuses to marry, and has her brother, Kundan, sent to jail. When his brother, Suraj, returns from abroad, Bahadur decides to withhold this information from him. In order to keep up appearances, Bahadur gets his men to rob their neighbor, Hiralal's house, of all jewellery and cash. But Hiralal wakes up, calls for help and for the police, and one of Bahadur's men is arrested. When Bahadur finds out that the police have traced him to his house, Suraj decides to take the rap for him, is arrested and imprisoned. On Suraj's return, Bahadur announces his marriage to Rekha, Hiralal's daughter. The problem is that Suraj and Rekha love each other, and the question is will Suraj be willing to make another sacrifice for his brother this time?

== Cast ==
- Rajendra Kumar as Suraj
- Raakhee as Rekha
- Pran as Raja Bahadur
- Bhagwan Dada as Prisoner #420
- Brahm Bhardwaj as Saudagarmal
- Som Dutt as Inspector Ranvir
- Anwar Hussain as Kundan
- Jagdeep as Baanke
- Kanhaiyalal as Dhaniram
- Kumkum as Dulari
- Ram Mohan as Shankar
- Moolchand as Wedding guest
- Amin Sayani as Radio announcer
- Shivraj as Khajanchi Girdharilal
- Sunder as Rambhai
- Gulshan Kumar Mehta (Gulshan Bawra) as train passenger with radio

== Soundtrack ==
#	Title	Singer(s)
1	"Badnaam Ho Gaya Dil"	Asha Bhosle
2	"Khati Hoon Kasam"	Mohammed Rafi, Lata Mangeshkar
3	"Lo Ham Aaye Dulha Bhaiya Ke"	Mohammed Rafi
4	"Naam Nahin Koi Dham Nahin"	Mohammed Rafi
5	"Oopar Dekho Ya Neeche"	Mohammed Rafi
6	"Jab Tum Ho Mere Hamsafar"	Mohammed Rafi
7	"Tum Meri Ho"	Mohammed Rafi, Lata Mangeshkar
