= List of Hindi films of 1958 =

A list of films produced by the Bollywood film industry based in Mumbai in 1958:

== Highest-grossing films ==
The ten highest-grossing films at the Indian box office in 1958:

| Rank | Title | Gross collection |
| 1 | Madhumati | ₹4 crore |
| 2 | Chalti Ka Naam Gaadi | ₹2.5 crore |
| 3 | Yahudi | ₹2 crore |
| 4 | Phir Subha Hogi | ₹1.8 crore |
| 5 | Sadhna | ₹1.6 crore |
| 6 | Phagun | ₹1.5 crore |
| 7 | Parvarish | ₹1.3 crore |
| 8 | Kala Pani | ₹1.2 crore |
| 9 | Howrah Bridge | ₹1.1 crore |
| 10 | Dilli Ka Thug | ₹1 crore |

== A-D ==
| Title | Director | Cast | Genre | Notes |
|---|---|---|---|---|
| 12 O'Clock | Pramod Chakravorty | Guru Dutt, Waheeda Rehman, Shashikala, Johnny Walker | Suspense Romance | Music: O. P. Nayyar Lyrics: Majrooh Sultanpuri, Sahir Ludhianvi |
| Aakhri Dao | Mahesh Kaul | Shekhar, Nutan, Johnny Walker, Shubha Khote, Minu Mumtaz, Shammi | Social | Music: Madan Mohan Lyrics: Majrooh Sultanpuri |
| Adalat | Kalidas | Nargis, Pradeep Kumar, Pran, Yakub, Achala Sachdev, Murad | Social Drama | Music: Madan Mohan Lyrics: Rajendra Krishan |
| Aji Bas Shukriya | Mohammed Husain | Geeta Bali, Suresh, Johnny Walker, Shubha Khote, Tun Tun, Shammi, Mukri, Agha | Family Drama | Music: Roshan Lyrics: Shailendra, Prem Dhawan, Usha Khanna, Faruk Kaiser |
| Alladin Ka Chirag | T. R. Raghunath | Nageswara Rao, Anjali Devi, Rajasulochana | Fantasy | Music: S. Rajeswara Rao Lyrics: Pal Premi |
| Al Hilal | Akkoo | Mahipal, Shakila, Hiralal, Sheikh, Ruby Myers | Action Drama Costume | Music: Bulo C Rani Lyrics: Shewan Rizvi |
| Amardeep | T. Prakash Rao | Dev Anand, Vyjayanthimala, Pran, Padmini, Ragini, Johnny Walker, Om Prakash, David | Social Drama | Music: C. Ramchandra Lyrics: Rajendra Krishan |
| Baghi Sipahi | Bhagwan Das Varma | Madhubala, Ranjan, Nishi, Om Prakash, Chandrashekhar, Purnima, Gope, Sapru | Action Costume | Music: Shankar Jaikishan Lyrics: Hasrat Jaipuri, Shailendra |
| Balyogi Upmanyu | Harsukh Bhatt | Vinod Kumar, Lalita Pawar, Sulochana, Jeevan, Madan Puri, Kanhaiyalal | Devotional | Music: Chitragupta Lyrics: Bharat Vyas |
| Bhala Aadmi | Bhagwan | Bhagwan, Chandrashekhar, Anita Guha, Kumkum, Ulhas, Kumar | Social | Music: Nisar Bazmi Lyrics: Anand Bakshi |
| Bhola Shikaar | Akkoo | Kamran, Naazi, Shabnam, G. M. Durrani, Nilofar | Action | Music: Gyan Dutt Lyrics: Majrooh Sultanpuri |
| Chaalbaaz | Nanabhai Bhatt | Nirupa Roy, Jairaj, Nishi, Bhagwan, K. N. Singh, Tiwari, Shammi, David | Action | Music: Chitragupta Lyrics: Yogesh, Anjum Jaipuri, Prem Dhawan |
| Chalti Ka Naam Gaadi | Satyen Bose | Kishore Kumar, Madhubala, Ashok Kumar, Anoop Kumar, Veena, K. N. Singh, Cuckoo, Helen | Comedy | Music: S. D. Burman Lyrics: Majrooh Sultanpuri |
| Chandan | M. V. Raman | Nutan, Kishore Kumar, Mala Sinha, Pran, Shyama, Karan Dewan, David, K. N. Singh | Family Drama | Music: Madan Mohan Lyrics: Rajendra Krishan |
| Chandu | Majnu | Daljit, Shashikala, Om Prakash, Gulab, Pran, Gope, Meena, Sunder, Majnu, Mehmood | Social | Music: Bipin Babul Lyrics: Raja Mehdi Ali Khan, Raj Baldev Raj |
| Chaubees Ghante | Dwarka Khosla | Premnath, Shakila, Nishi, K. N. Singh, Maruti, Shammi, Sheela Vaz, Kanchanmala | Action Social | Music: Bipin Babul Lyrics: Raja Mehdi Ali Khan |
| Circus Sundari | Chandrakant, C. M. Trivedi | Kamini Kaushal, Mahipal, Kamal Kapoor, Tiwari, Maruti | Action Drama | Music: Avinash Vyas Lyrics: Qamar Jalalabadi |
| Daughter Of Sindbad | Ratilal | Nadira, Jairaj, Pran, Kamal Kapoor, S. N. Tripathi, Jeevankala | Fantasy Costume | Music: Chitragupta Lyrics: Prem Dhawan, Anjum Jaipuri |
| Detective | Shakti Samanta | Pradeep Kumar, Mala Sinha, Johnny Walker, K. N. Singh, Sulochana, Daisy Irani | Action | Music: Mukul Roy Lyrics: Shailendra |
| Devar Bhabhi | Kedar Kapoor | Balraj Sahni, Mala Sinha, Rajendra Kumar, Radhakishen, Sarita, Leela Mishra | Family Drama | Music: Ravi Lyrics: Shailendra, Raja Mehdi Ali Khan |
| Dilli Ka Thug | S. D. Narang | Nutan, Kishore Kumar, Madan Puri, Iftekhar | Comedy Romance | Music: Ravi Lyrics: Majrooh Sultanpuri, S.H. Bihari |
| Do Mastane | Harish Tara | Geeta Bali, Motilal, Nigar Sultana, Begum Para, Sheikh Mukhtar, Johnny Walker, N. A. Ansari, Murad, Tun Tun, Sapru | Social Action Drama | Music: Hemant Kumar Lyrics: S.H. Bihari, Indeevar, Kaif Irfani |
| Do Phool | A.R. Kardar | Master Romi, Baby Naaz, Vijaya Choudhary, David, Agha, Jeevan, Bipin Gupta | Children Drama | Music: Vasant Desai Lyrics: Hasrat Jaipuri |
| Dulhan | V. M. Vyas | Nirupa Roy, Raaj Kumar, Nanda, Jeevan, Agha, Manorama, Bhagwan, N. A. Ansari | Family Drama | Music: Ravi Lyrics: S.H. Bihari, Pyarelal Santoshi |

== E-M ==
| Title | Director | Cast | Genre | Notes |
|---|---|---|---|---|
| Ek Shola | Chander Saigal | Pradeep Kumar, Mala Sinha, Naaz, Shubha Khote, Leela Mishra, Nazir Hussain, Jawahar Kaul | Family Drama | Music: Madan Mohan Lyrics: Majrooh Sultanpuri |
| Farishta | Ravindra Dave | Ashok Kumar, Meena Kumari, Sohrab Modi, Anita Guha, Nana Palsikar, Murad, Mubarak, Mehmood | Social | Music: O. P. Nayyar Lyrics: Jan Nisar Akhtar |
| Gaj Gauri | Raja Thakur | Shahu Modak, Ratnamala, Anant Kumar, Sulochana, Nana Palsikar | Monster Fantasy | Music: Sudhir Phadke Lyrics: Bharat Vyas |
| Gauri Shankar | Raja Nene | Trilok Kapoor, Sulochana, Jeevan, Kamal Kapoor, Bimla Kumari | Mythology | Music: Shivram Lyrics: Saraswati Kumar Deepak, S.P. Kalla |
| Ghar Grihasti | Gunjal | Balraj Sahni, Jayshree Gadkar, Naaz, Jugal Kishore, Leela Mishra, Shanta Hublikar, Sunder, Sabita Chatterjee | Family | Music: Shashank Banerji Lyrics: Pandit Madhur |
| Ghar Sansar | V. M. Vyas | Nargis, Balraj Sahni, Rajendra Kumar, Johnny Walker, Kumkum, Shammi, Devika, N. A. Ansari | Family Drama | Music: Ravi Lyrics: Majrooh Sultanpuri |
| Gopichand | Ishwarlal | Shyama, Shahu Modak, Prem Adib, B. M. Vyas, Durga Khote, Sunder | Costume Drama | Music: Avinash Vyas Lyrics: Bharat Vyas |
| Great Show Of India | Chandrakant, C. M. Trivedi | Kamini Kaushal, Mahipal, Kamal Kapoor, Tiwari, Maruti | Action Drama | Music: Avinash Vyas Lyrics: Qamar Jalalabadi |
| Harishchandra | Dhirubhai Desai | Shahu Modak, Sulochana, Kanchanmala, Kanhaiyalal | Mythology | Music: Sushant Bannerji Lyrics: Pandit Madhur |
| Hathkadi | Sudarshan Bhatia | Motilal, Shakila, Jabeen, Amarnath, Murad, Leela Mishra, Sajjan, Rajan Haksar | Crime Drama | Music: Nashad Lyrics: Prem Saxena, Indeevar, Anjaan |
| Howrah Bridge | Shakti Samanta | Ashok Kumar, Madhubala, K. N. Singh, Om Prakash, Mehmood, Minu Mumtaz, Madan Puri, Helen, Kammo | Thriller Action Romance | Music: O. P. Nayyar Lyrics: Hasrat Jaipuri, Qamar Jalalabadi |
| Hum Bhi Kuchh Kam Nahin | Raman B. Desai | Ranjan, Ameeta, Sumitra Devi, Kanu Roy, Majnu | Action | Music: S. D. Batish Lyrics: Anand Bakshi, Kaif Irfani, Sharki Bhopali, Rahil Gorakhpuri |
| Jung Bahadur | G. P. Pawar | Chandrashekhar, Shashikala, Purnima, Naranjan Sharma, Ram Avatar, Moni Chatterjee | Action Costume | Music: Avinash Vyas Lyrics: Qamar Jalalabadi |
| Kabhi Andhera Kabhi Ujala | C. P. Dixit | Nutan, Kishore Kumar, Shekhar, Madan Puri, K. N. Singh, Chitra, Yakub, Lalita Pawar, Helen, Tun Tun | Crime Drama Romance | Music: O. P. Nayyar Lyrics: Majrooh Sultanpuri |
| Jailor | Sohrab Modi | Sohrab Modi, Geeta Bali, Raaj Kumar, Kamini Kaushal, Abhi Bhattacharya, Daisy Irani, Nana Palsikar, Lillian | Social | Music: Madan Mohan Lyrics: Rajendra Krishan |
| Kala Pani | Raj Khosla | Dev Anand, Madhubala, Nalini Jaywant, Kishore Sahu, Nazir Hussain, Jayant, Johnny Walker, Krishan Dhawan, Jankidas | Crime Drama Romance | Dev Anand won the Filmfare Award for Best Actor. Music: S. D. Burman Lyrics: Majrooh Sultanpuri |
| Karigar | Vasant Joglekar | Ashok Kumar, Nirupa Roy, Om Prakash, Lalita Pawar, Dhumal, Gajanan Jagirdar, Minu Mumtaz, Nazir Kashmiri, Edwina, Kartar Singh, Madhu Apte, Agha, Helen | Social Family | Music: C. Ramchandra Lyrics: Rajendra Krishan |
| Khazanchi | P. N. Arora | Balraj Sahni, Rajendra Kumar, Shyama, Chitra, Helen, Minu Mumtaz, Keshto Mukherjee, Rajan Haksar, Shammi | Family Social | Music: Madan Mohan Lyrics: Rajendra Krishan |
| Khota Paisa | M. Sadiq | Johnny Walker, Shyama, Amirbai Karnataki, N. A. Ansari, Jeevan, Cuckoo, Jeevankala | Social | Music: Madan Mohan Lyrics: Rajendra Krishan |
| Lajwanti | Narendra Suri | Nargis, Balraj Sahni, Prabhu Dayal, Baby Naaz, Radhakishen, Nazir Kashmiri, Leela Mishra, Mumtaz Begum | Family Social | The film received Certificate of Merit at the 1959 - National Film Award for Best Feature Film in Hindi. It was nominated for the Palme d'Or for Best Film at the 1959 Cannes Film Festival. Music: S. D. Burman Lyrics: Majrooh Sultanpuri |
| Lala Rookh | Akhtar Siraj | Talat Mahmood, Shyama, Radhika, Vikram Kapoor, Tun Tun, Jagdish Kanwal | Legend Drama | Music: Khayyam Lyrics: Kaifi Azmi |
| Light House | G. P. Sippy | Ashok Kumar, Nutan, Johnny Walker, Nigar Sultana, Naazi | Suspense | Music: N. Datta Lyrics: Sahir Ludhianvi |
| Madhumati | Bimal Roy | Dilip Kumar, Vyjayanthimala, Johnny Walker, Pran, Jayant, Tiwari, Tarun Bose | Reincarnation Romance | Music: Salil Chowdhary Lyrics: Shailendra Madhumathi became the highest-grossing film of 1958. It won 9 Filmfare Awards; including Best Film, Best Director, Best Music Director, Best Female Playback Singer, Best Dialogue, Best Art Direction and Best Cinematographer—the most awards for a film at that time. It also won the National Film Award for Best Feature Film in Hindi. |
| Maalik | S. M. Yusuf | Talat Mahmood, Suraiya, Lalita Pawar, Prabhu Dayal, Tun Tun, Kumar, Mukri, Malika, Radhakishan, Badri Prasad, Jagdeep | Social Family Drama | Music: Ghulam Mohammed Lyrics: Shakeel Badayuni |
| Matwala | M A Thirumugam | Anjali Devi, Ranjan, M. K. Radha, E V Saroja | Action | Music: R Sudarsanam Lyrics: Hargobind |
| Maya Bazar | Babubhai Mistri | Mahipal, Anita Guha, B. M. Vyas, Vasantrao Pahelwan | Mythology | Music: Chitragupta Lyrics: Indeevar, G. S. Nepali |
| Mehndi | S.M. Yusuf | Ajit, Jayshree, Veena, Kumar | | Music: Ravi Lyrics: Khumar Barabankvi, S. H. Bihari, Kamil Rashid and Sarvar |
| Milan | Kedar Kapoor | Ajit, Nalini Jaywant, Nishi, Daisy Irani, Helen, Tiwari, Rajendra Nath, Maruti, Jagdish Kanwal | Drama | Music: Hansraj Behl Lyrics: Prem Dhawan |
| Miss 1958 | Kuldip Kahar | Suraiya, Karan Dewan, Om Prakash, Krishna Kumari, Madan Puri, Naaz | Social | Music: Datta Naik Lyrics: Tanveer Naqvi, Raja Mehdi Ali Khan |
| Mr. Q | K. Parvez | Bhagwan, Amarnath, Heera Sawant, Tun Tun, Nazir Kashmiri | | Music: Manohar Lyrics: Akhtar Romani, Asad Bhopali, Shyam Sarhadi, Muzaffar Shahjahanpuri |
| Mr. Qartoon M.A. | Ved Madan | Daljeet, Shyama, Johnny Walker, Kumkum, Mehmood, Minu Mumtaz, Raj Mehra, Sheela Vaz | Comedy | Music: O. P. Nayyar Lyrics: Hasrat Jaipuri |
| Mujrim | O. P. Ralhan | Shammi Kapoor, Geeta Bali, Padmini, Ragini, Johnny Walker, Tun Tun, Shubha Khote, Kamal Kapoor, Murad | Crime Thriller | Music: O. P. Nayyar Lyrics: Majrooh Sultanpuri |

== N-R ==
| Title | Director | Cast | Genre | Notes |
|---|---|---|---|---|
| Naag Champa | Vinod Desai | Nirupa Roy, Manhar Desai, Lalita Pawar, Sapru, Kammo, Sunder, Maqbul | Fantasy | Music: Manna Dey Lyrics: Anjaan |
| Naya Kadam | S. P. Kalla | Balraj Sahni, Bhagwan, Roopmala, Nazir Hussain, Lalita Pawar, Daisy Irani, Sulochana, Naaz, Agha, Sunder | Family Social | Music: Shivram Lyrics: S.P. Kalla, Bharat Vyas |
| Naya Paisa | Aspi Irani | Johnny Walker, Chand Usmani, Krishna Kumari, Tun Tun, Manohar Deepak, Kanchanmala, Mumtaz Ali, Shammi | Social Drama | Music: S. Mohinder Lyrics: Raja Mehdi Ali Khan, Verma Malik, Anjaan |
| Night Club | Naresh Saigal | Ashok Kumar, Kamini Kaushal, Nishi, Mubarak, Helen, Iftekhar, Gope, Dhumal, Maruti | Action | Music: Madan Mohan Lyrics: Majrooh Sultanpuri |
| Panchayat | Lekhraj Bhakri | Raaj Kumar, Shyama, Manoj Kumar, Jabeen, Daisy Irani, Kanhaiyalal, Kuldip Kaur, Pandari Bai, Nazir Hussain, Manorama, Leela Mishra, Sunder | Family Social Drama | Music: Iqbal Qureshi Lyrics: Shakeel Badayuni |
| Parvarish | S. Bannerjee | Raj Kapoor, Meena Kumari, Mehmood, Lalita Pawar, Nazir Hussain, Radhakishan, Brahm Bhardwaj, Sheela Vaz | Family Social | Music: Dattaram Wadkar Lyrics: Hasrat Jaipuri |
| Pati Parmeshwar | Manu Desai | Nirupa Roy, Manhar Desai, Ajit, Sabita Chatterjee, Dulari, Rooplakshmi | Family Drama | Music: Avinash Vyas Lyrics: Bharat Vyas |
| Phagun | Bibhuti Mitra | Bharat Bhushan, Madhubala, Nishi, Mehmood, Kammo, Jeevan, Murad, Cuckoo | Social | Music: O. P. Nayyar Lyrics: Qamar Jalalabadi |
| Phir Subha Hogi | Ramesh Sehgal | Raj Kapoor, Mala Sinha, Rehman, Leela Chitnis, Tun Tun, Kamal Kapoor, Nana Palsikar, Mubarak, Jagdish Sethi | Social Crime | Music: Khayyam Lyrics: Sahir Ludhianvi |
| Piya Milan | T. R. Raghunath | Vyjayanthimala, M. N. Rajan, Raja Sulochana, T. K. Ramachandran, Helen, Shree Ram | Romance Drama | Dubbed from Tamil. Music: Ramesh Lyrics: Hasrat Jaipuri |
| Police | Kalidas | Madhubala, Pradeep Kumar, Nadira, Om Prakash, Dhumal | Action Romance | Music: Hemant Kumar Lyrics: Majrooh Sultanpuri, Neelkanth Tiwari |
| Post Box 999 | Ravindra Dave | Sunil Dutt, Shakila, Purnima, Tiwari, Amarnath, Manorama, Nazir Kashmiri, Narmada Shankar | Action Suspense | Music: Kalyanji Virji Shah Lyrics: Pyarelal Santoshi |
| Raagini | Rakhan | Ashok Kumar, Kishore Kumar, Padmini, Jabeen, Nazir Hussain, Achala Sachdev, Iftekhar, Narmada Shankar | Romance Drama | Music: O P Nayyar Lyrics: Jan Nisar Akhtar, Qamar Jalalabadi |
| Raj Pratigya | Jaswant Zaveri | Jairaj, Nirupa Roy, Sabita Chatterjee, B. M. Vyas, Praveen Paul, Sunder, Arvind | Action Costume | Music: Sanmukh Babu Lyrics: Bharat Vyas |
| Raj Sinhasan | Kundan Kumar | Mahipal, Ameeta, Chandrashekhar, Shetty, W. M. Khan, Hiralal, Sunder, Kammo, Sheela Vaz, Kanchanmala | Romance Drama Costume | Music: Chitragupta Lyrics: Anjum Jaipuri |
| Raj Tilak | S. S. Vasan | Gemini Ganesan, Vyjayanthimala, Padmini, Pran, Lalita Pawar, Durga Khote, Manmohan Krishna, Shammi | Romance Drama Costume | Music: C. Ramchandra Lyrics: P. L. Santoshi |
| Ram Bhakta Vibishan | Samar Chatterjee | Nirupa Roy, Shahu Modak, Krishna Kumari, Prem Adib, Bipin Gupta | Devotional | Music: Ajit Merchant Lyrics: Saraswati Kumar Deepak |

== S-Z ==
| Title | Director | Cast | Genre | Notes |
|---|---|---|---|---|
| Sachche Ka Bol Bala | Bhagwan | Chandrashekhar, Kumkum, Bhagwan, Jeevankala, Shyam Kumar, Cuckoo | Action | Music; Nisar Bazmi lyrics: Saba Afghani |
| Sadhna | B. R. Chopra | Vyjayanthimala, Sunil Dutt, Leela Chitnis, Radhakishan, Manmohan Krishna | Social | Music: Datta Naik Lyrics: Sahir Ludhianvi Vyjayanthimala won the Filmfare Award for Best Actress |
| Sahara | Lekhraj Bhakri | Meena Kumari, M. Rajan, Kuldip Kaur, Daisy Irani, Manoj Kumar, Kammo, Badri Prasad, Leela Mishra | Family Drama | Music: Hemant Kumar Lyrics: Bharat Vyas |
| Sair-E-Paristan | A. M. Khan | Kamran, Chitra, N. A. Ansari, Amarnath, Kanchanmala, Maqbul, Jagdish Kanwal | Fantasy | Music: Suresh Talwar Lyrics: Anjaan, Shakeel Nomani, Qamar Sarhadi |
| Samrat Chandragupt | Babubhai Mistri | Bharat Bhushan, Nirupa Roy, Krishna Kumari, B. M. Vyas, Ulhas, Anwar Hussain, Samar Roy | Historical Drama | Music: Kalyanji Virji Shah Lyrics: Hasrat Jaipuri, Indeevar, Bharat Vyas |
| Sanskar | Chaturbhuj Doshi | Anant Kumar, Ameeta, Jayshree Gadkar, Chand Usmani, Yakub, Leela Mishra, Badri Prasad, Kanu Roy, Raj Kishore, Indira Bansal | Social Family | Music: Anil Biswas Lyrics: Indeevar, Diwakar, Sarshar Sailani |
| Savera | Satyen Bose | Ashok Kumar, Meena Kumari, Bhagwan, Kammo, Bipin Gupta, Leela Mishra | Social | Music: Sailesh Lyrics: Shailendra, Prem Dhawan |
| Shan-E-Hatim | Nanubhai Vakil | Daljeet, Chitra, Kanchanmala, Naazi, W. M. Khan, Tun Tun, Hiralal, Anwari | Fantasy | Music: A. R. Qureshi Lyrics: Raja Mehdi Ali Khan |
| Sim Sim Marjina | Narendra Dave | Mahipal, Shakila, Tiwari, Hiralal, Kanchanmala, Helen, Maruti, Roopmala | Fantasy | Music: A. R. Qureshi, Hansraj Behl Lyrics: Asad Bhopali, Prem Dhawan |
| Sitamgar | T. Prakash Rao | Shivaji Ganesan, Padmini, Ragini, Helen, M. K. Radha | | Dubbed from Tamil Uttama Puthran (1958). Music: G. Ramanathan, B.N. Bali Lyrics: Sajan Bihari |
| Sitaron Se Aage | Satyen Bose | Ashok Kumar, Vyjayanthimala, Johnny Walker, Manmohan Krishna, Leela Mishra, Jagdish Sethi, Rajasulochana, Shammi | Family | Music: S. D. Burman Lyrics: Majrooh Sultanpuri |
| Sohni Mahiwal | Raja Nawathe | Bharat Bhushan, Nimmi, Om Prakash, Achala Sachdev, Kumar, Chand Burq, Mukri, Tun Tun | Legend Romance | Music: Naushad Lyrics: Shakeel Badayuni |
| Solva Saal | Raj Khosla | Dev Anand, Waheeda Rehman, Sunder, Tun Tun | Romance | Music: S. D. Burman Lyrics: Majrooh Sultanpuri |
| Son of Sinbad | Nanabhai Bhatt | Premnath, Nishi, Purnima, Kuldip Kaur, Tiwari, Bhagwan, Shammi, Jagdish Sethi, Cuckoo | Fantasy | Music: Chitragupta Lyrics: Prem Dhawan |
| Sone Ki Chidiya | Shaheed Lateef | Balraj Sahni, Nutan, Talat Mehmood, Vikram Kapoor, Dhumal, Amar, Baij Sharma, Pratima Devi, Sarita Devi | Social Romance | Music: O. P. Nayyar Lyrics: Sahir Ludhianvi, Majrooh Sultanpuri |
| Suhaag | B. R. Panthulu | Shivaji Ganesan, Jamuna, T. R. Rajkumari, Gemini Ganesan, M.V. Rajamma | Action Drama Fantasy | Music: T. G. Lingappa Lyrics: Ehsan Rizvi |
| Sun To Le Hasina | S. P. Bakshi | Ravindra Kapoor, Shashikala, Sabita Chatterjee, Agha, Badri Prasad, Kanu Roy, Gulab, Sunder | Social | Music: S. Mohinder Lyrics: Anand Bakshi, Rahil Gorakhpuri, Kaif Irfani, Sarshar Sailani |
| Suvarna Sundari | Vedantam Raghavayya | Nageshwara Rao, Anjali Devi, Shyama, Daisy Irani, B. Saroja Devi, Kumkum, Bipin Gupta, Dhumal, Sapru | Fantasy | Music: Adinarayana Rao Lyrics: Bharat Vyas |
| Talaq | Mahesh Kaul | Rajendra Kumar, Kamini Kadam, Radhakrishan, Yashodra Katju, Sajjan | Family | Music: C. Ramachandra Lyrics: Pradeep |
| Taqdeer | A. S. Arora | Karan Dewan, Shyama, Asha Mathur, Madan Puri, Helen, Tun Tun, Maqbul, Sheela Vaz | Family | Music: Dhaniram Lyrics: Verma Malik, Kuldip Singh Chand |
| Taxi 555 | Lekhraj Bhakri | Pradeep Kumar, Shakila, Mahipal, Azra, Chand Usmani, Lalita Pawar, Leela Mishra, Nazir Kashmiri, Hiralal, Sunder, Maruti | Action | Music: Sardar Malik Lyrics: Prem Dhawan |
| Taxi Stand | Gajanan Jagirdar | Chandrashekhar, Anita Guha, Om Prakash, K. N. Singh, Tun Tun, Majnu, Rajan Haksar, Kanchanmala | Action | Music: Chitragupta Lyrics: Majrooh Sultanpuri |
| Ten O'Clock | Jugal Kishore | Geeta Bali, Suresh, Yakub, Sheikh Mukhtar, Daisy Irani, Kanchanmala, Maruti | Action | Music: Ram Ganguly Lyrics: Verma Malik, Shyam, Khawar Zaman |
| Teerth Yatra | B. K. Adarsh | Mahipal, Jaymala, Nana Palsikar, Hiralal, Indira Bansal | Devotional | Music: Suresh Talwar Lyrics: Saraswati Kumar Deepak, Madan Mohan, Adarsh |
| Teesri Gali, Gope got heart attack on the sat during this movie and he died on the spot | Kundan Kumar | Abhi Bhattacharya, Shyama, Prem Adib, Leela Mishra, Gope, Mohan Choti, Kammo | Action Crime Romance | Music: Chitragupta Lyrics: Majrooh Sultanpuri, Anjum Jaipuri |
| Trolley Driver | Gajanan Jagirdar | Suraiya, Rehman, Usha Kiran, Bhagwan, Madan Puri, Gajanan Jagirdar, Cuckoo | Drama | Music: Husnlal Bhagatram, Lyrics: Sarshar Sailani, Asad Bhopali |
| Virsa and the Magic Doll | Santi P. Choudhury | | Documentary | |
| Yahudi | | Meena Kumari, Dilip Kumar, Sohrab Modi, Nasir Hussain, Anwar Hussain, Nigar Sultana | | Music: Shankar Jaikishan Lyrics: Shailendra, Hasrat Jaipuri |
| Zimbo | Homi Wadia | Azad, Chitra, Krishna Kumari, Achala Sachdev, B. M. Vyas, Dalpat, Nilofar, Kanchanmala | Action Fantasy | Music: Chitragupta Lyrics: Majrooh Sultanpuri |
| Zindagi Ya Toofan | Nakshab | Pradeep Kumar, Nutan, Om Prakash, Yakub, Johnny Walker, Minu Mumtaz | Social Drama | Music:Shaukat Dehlvi Nashad Lyricist: Nakhshab Jaravchi |
