= 6th Filmfare Awards =

1959 awards for Hindi cinema

- Date: 10 May 1959
- Site: Bombay
- Hosted by: J. C. Jain

Highlights
- Best Film: Madhumati
- Best Actor: Dev Anand for Kala Pani
- Best Actress: Vyjayanthimala for Sadhna
- Most awards: Madhumati (9)
- Most nominations: Madhumati (12)

The 6th Filmfare Awards were held on 10 May 1959, at Bombay, honoring the best films in Hindi Cinema for the year 1958.

Madhumati led the ceremony with 12 nominations, followed by Sadhna with 6 nominations and Yahudi with 5 nominations.

Madhumati won 9 awards – a record at the time – including Best Film, Best Director (for Bimal Roy) and Best Supporting Actor (for Johnny Walker), thus becoming the most-awarded film at the ceremony.

The ceremony was also noted as Vyjayanthimala became the first ever actor to receive dual acting nominations in the same year for her performances in Madhumati and Sadhna, winning for the latter. The nominations also make her the first-ever multi-nominee across all categories, a record she shares with Mukhram Sharma nominated for Sadhna and Talaaq, winning for the former. The win also makes her the first performer in Filmfare history to win in both leading and supporting categories.

== Main awards ==
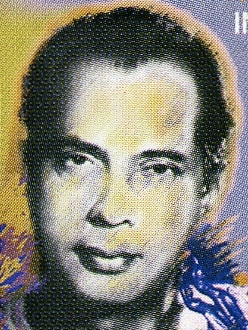
Bimal Roy, Best Director

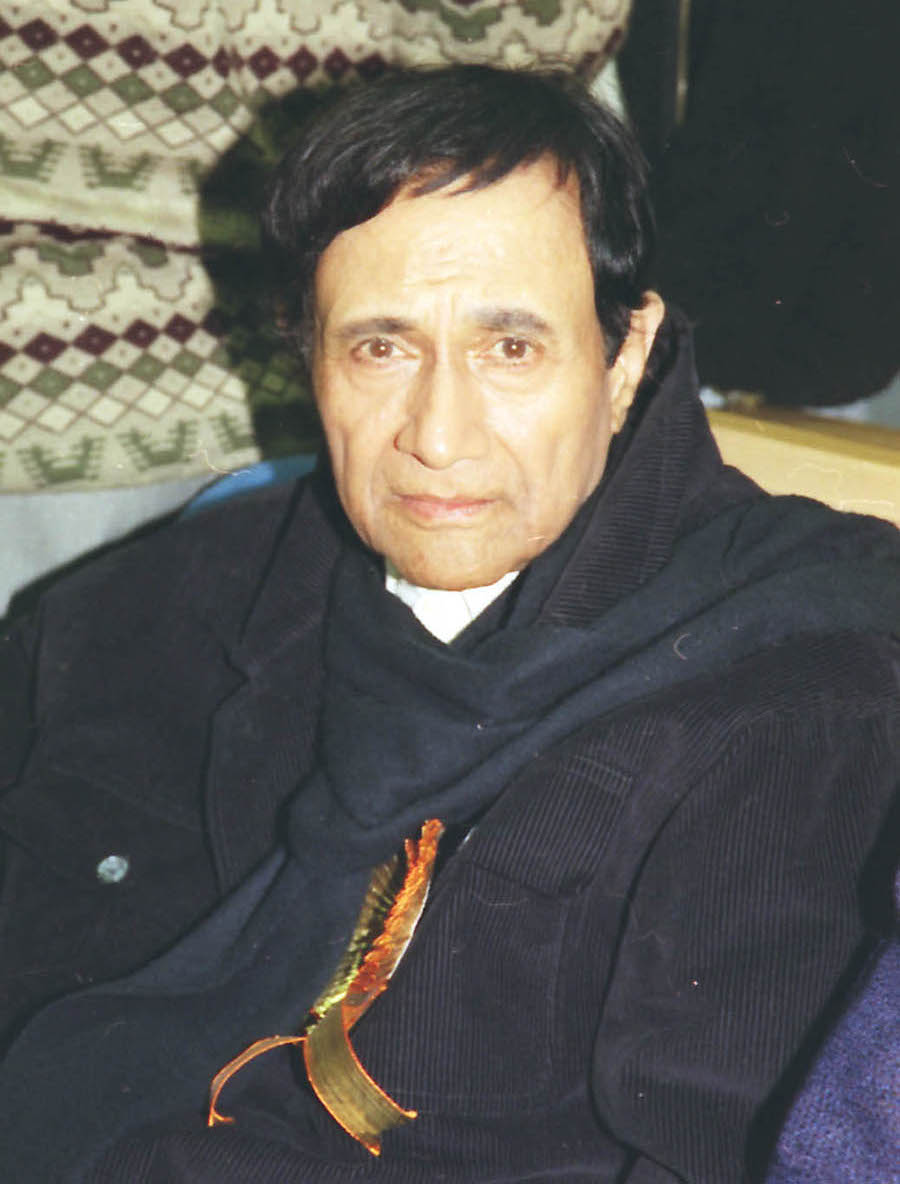
Dev Anand, Best Actor

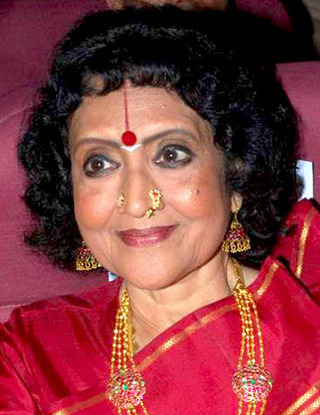
Vyjayanthimala, Best Actress

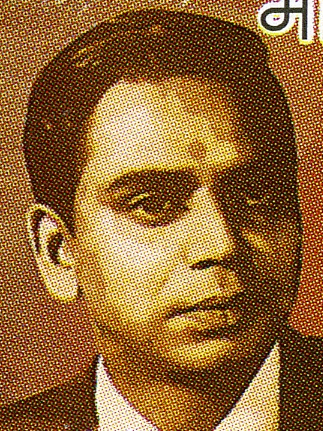
Shailendra, Best Lyricist

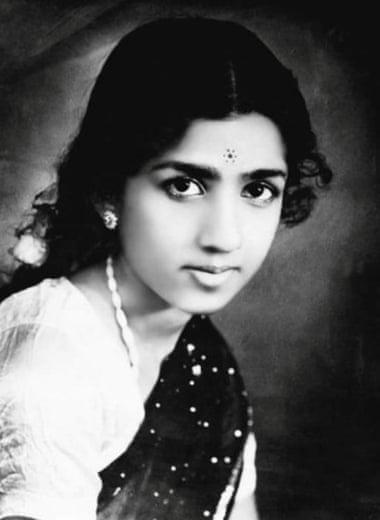
Lata Mangeshkar, Best Playback Singer

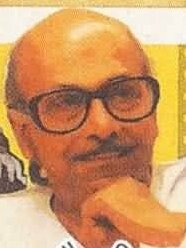
Salil Chowdhury, Best Music Director

Best Film	Best Director
Madhumati – Bimal Roy Productions – Bimal Roy; Sadhna – B. R. Films – B. R. Chopra; Talaaq – Anupam Chitra – Mahesh Kaul, Mukhram Sharma	Bimal Roy – Madhumati; B. R. Chopra – Sadhna; Mahesh Kaul – Talaaq
Best Actor	Best Actress
Dev Anand – Kala Pani as Karan Mehra; Dilip Kumar – Madhumati as Anand / Deven; Raj Kapoor – Phir Subha Hogi as Ram Babu	Vyjayanthimala – Sadhna as Champabai / Rajani; Meena Kumari – Sahara as Leela; Vyjayanthimala – Madhumati as Madhumati / Madhavi / Radha
Best Supporting Actor	Best Supporting Actress
Johnny Walker – Madhumati as Charandas; Rehman – Phir Subha Hogi as Rehman; Sohrab Modi – Yahudi as Ezra	Nalini Jaywant – Kala Pani as Kishori; Lalita Pawar – Parvarish as Rukmini Singh; Leela Chitnis – Sadhna as Mother
Best Music Director	Best Lyricist
Salil Chowdhury – Madhumati; O. P. Nayyar – Phagun; Shankar–Jaikishan – Yahudi	Shailendra – "Yeh Mera Deewaanapan Hai" from Yahudi; Sahir Ludhianvi – "Aurat Ne Janam Diya" from Sadhna; Shailendra – "Meri Jaan" from Yahudi
Best Playback Singer – Male	Best Playback Singer – Female
Award won by a female singer	Lata Mangeshkar – "Aaja Re Pardesi" from Madhumati
Best Story	Best Dialogue
Mukhram Sharma – Sadhna; Mukhram Sharma – Talaaq; Ritwik Ghatak – Madhumati	Rajinder Singh Bedi – Madhumati

== Technical Awards ==
Best Editing	Best Cinematography
Hrishikesh Mukherjee – Madhumati	Dilip Gupta – Madhumati
Best Art Direction	Best Sound Design
Sudhendu Roy – Madhumati	Ishaan Ghosh – Chandan

== Superlatives ==
The following films had multiple wins and/or nominations

Movie	Awards	Nominations
Madhumati	9	12
Sadhna	2	6
Kala Pani	2	2
Yahudi	1	5
Talaaq	0	3
Phir Subha Hogi	0	2

== See also ==
- 7th Filmfare Awards
- 5th Filmfare Awards
- Filmfare Awards
