= 7th Filmfare Awards =

1960 awards for Hindi cinema

- Date: 1960
- Site: Bombay, India

Highlights
- Best Film: Sujata
- Best Actor: Raj Kapoor for Anari
- Best Actress: Nutan for Sujata
- Most awards: Anari (5)
- Most nominations: Sujata (8)

The 7th Filmfare Awards for Hindi-language films were held in 1960.

Sujata led the ceremony with 8 nominations, followed by Anari with 7 nominations, Chhoti Bahen with 6 nominations and Dhool Ka Phool with 4 nominations.

Anari won 5 awards, including Best Actor (for Raj Kapoor) and Best Supporting Actress (for Lalita Pawar), thus becoming the most-awarded film at the ceremony.

== Main awards ==
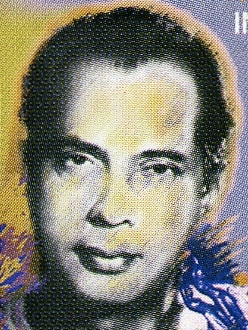
Bimal Roy, Best Director

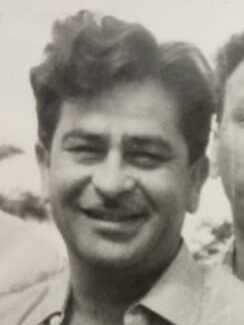
Raj Kapoor, Best Actor

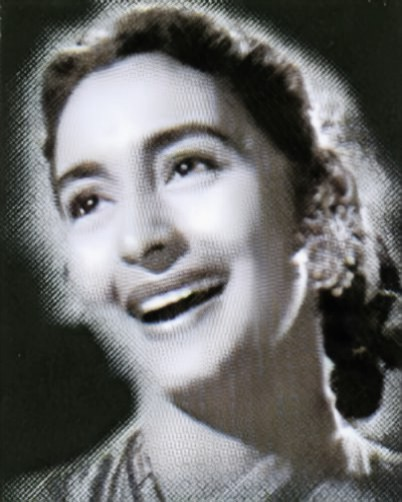
Nutan, Best Actress

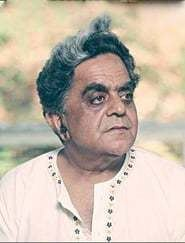
Manmohan Krishna, Best Supporting Actor

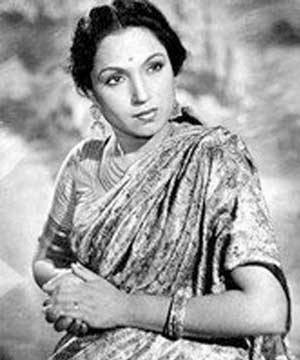
Lalita Pawar, Best Supporting Actress

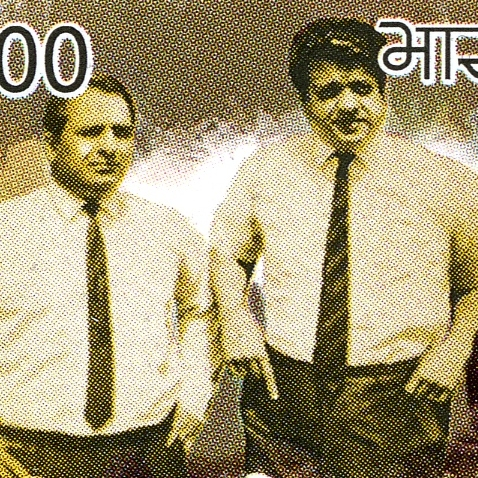
Shankar Jaikishan, Best Music Director

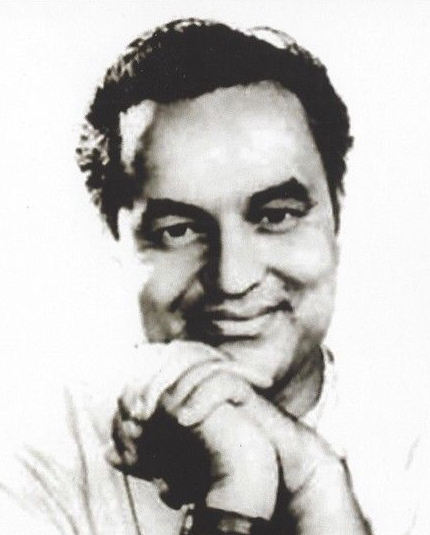
Mukesh, Best Playback Singer

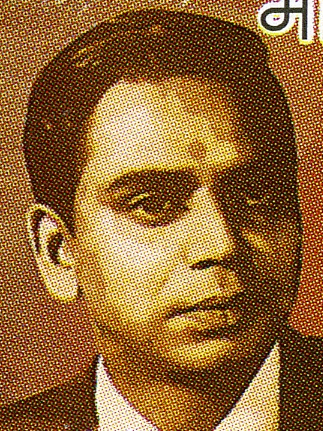
Shailendra, Best Lyricist

| Best Film | Best Director |
|---|---|
| Sujata – Bimal Roy Productions – Bimal Roy; Anari – L. B. Lachman; Chhoti Bahen – Prasad Productions Pvt. Ltd. – L. V. Prasad | Bimal Roy – Sujata; L. V. Prasad – Chhoti Bahen; V. Shantaram – Navrang |
| Best Actor | Best Actress |
| Raj Kapoor – Anari as Raj Kumar; Dilip Kumar – Paigham as Ratan Lal; Dev Anand – Love Marriage as Sonu/Sunil Kumar | Nutan – Sujata as Sujata; Mala Sinha – Dhool Ka Phool as Meena Khosla; Meena Kumari – Chirag Kahan Roshni Kahan as Ratna |
| Best Supporting Actor | Best Supporting Actress |
| Manmohan Krishna – Dhool Ka Phool as Abdul Rashid; Mehmood – Chhoti Bahen as Mahesh; Raaj Kumar – Paigham as Ram Lal | Lalita Pawar – Anari as Mrs. L. D'Sa; Anita Guha – Goonj Uthi Shehnai as Ramkali "Rami"; Shashikala – Sujata as Rama Chowdhury |
| Best Music Director | Best Lyricist |
| Shankar–Jaikishan – Anari; S. D. Burman – Sujata; Shankar–Jaikishan – Chhoti Bahen | Shailendra – "Sab Kuch Seekha Humne" from Anari; Majrooh Sultanpuri – "Jalte Hain Jiske Liye" from Sujata; Sahir Ludhianvi – "Tu Hindu Banega" from Dhool Ka Phool |
| Best Playback Singer – Male | Best Playback Singer – Female |
| Mukesh – "Sab Kuch Seekha Humne" from Anari; Talat Mehmood – "Jalte Hain Jiske Liye" from Sujata | Award won by a male singer; Lata Mangeshkar – "Bhaiya Mere" from Chhoti Bahen |
| Best Story | Best Dialogue |
| Subodh Ghosh – Sujata; Dhruv Chatterjee – Chirag Kahan Roshni Kahan; Mukhram Sharma – Dhool Ka Phool | Ramanand Sagar – Paigham; Inder Raj Anand – Anari; Inder Raj Anand – Chhoti Bahen |

== Technical Awards ==
| Best Editing | Best Cinematography |
|---|---|
| Chintamani Borkar – Navrang | V. K. Murthy – Kaagaz Ke Phool |
| Best Art Direction | Best Sound Design |
| M. R. Acharekar – Kaagaz Ke Phool | A. K. Parmar – Navrang |

== Biggest winners ==
| Movie | Awards | Nominations |
|---|---|---|
| Anari | 5 | 7 |
| Sujata | 4 | 8 |
| Navrang | 2 | 3 |
| Kaagaz Ke Phool | 2 | 2 |
| Dhool Ka Phool | 1 | 4 |
| Paigham | 1 | 3 |
| Chhoti Bahen | 0 | 6 |
| Chirag Kahan Roshni Kahan | 0 | 2 |

== See also ==
- Filmfare Awards
