= 2nd Filmfare Awards =

1955 awards for Hindi cinema

- Date: 1955
- Site: Bombay
- Directed by: Bimal Roy

Highlights
- Best Film: Boot Polish
- Best Actor: Bharat Bhushan for Shri Chaitanya Mahaprabhu
- Best Actress: Meena Kumari for Parineeta
- Most awards: Boot Polish (3)

The 2nd Filmfare Awards for Hindi cinema were held in 1955.

Boot Polish won 3 awards, including Best Film and Best Supporting Actor (for David), thus becoming the most-awarded films at the ceremony.

== Main awards ==
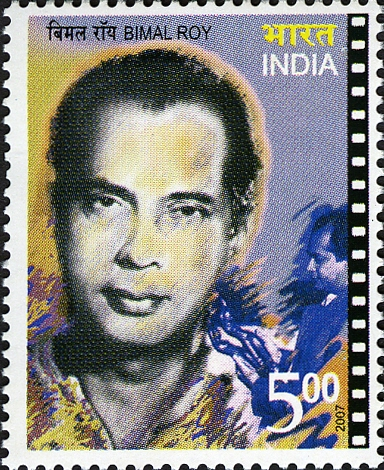
Bimal Roy, Best Director

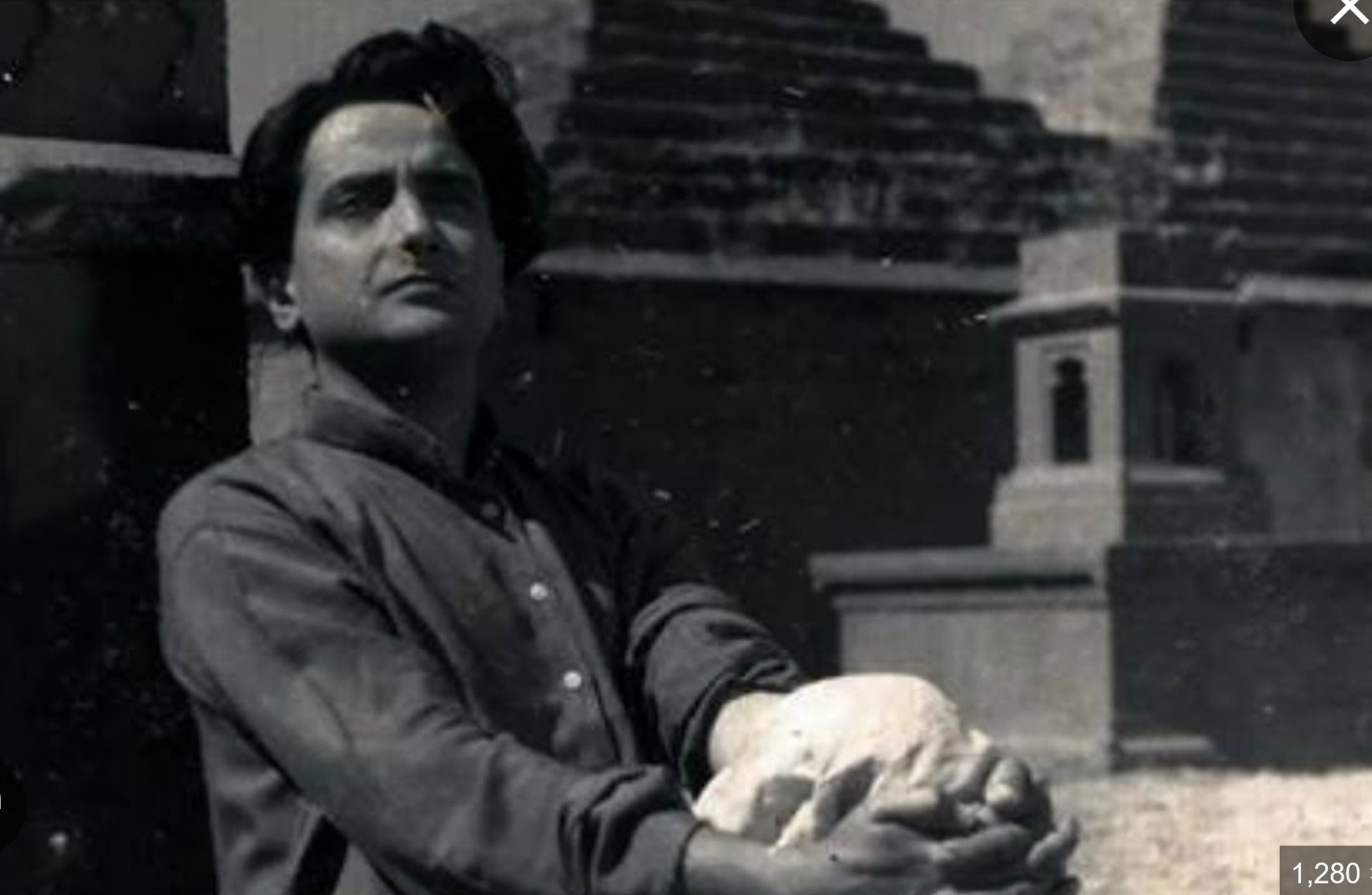
Bharat Bhushan, Best Actor

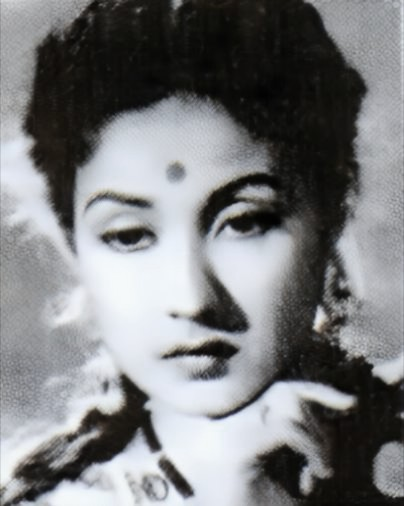
Meena Kumari, Best Actress

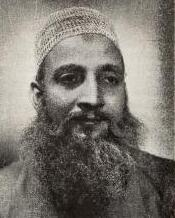
David, Best Supporting Actor

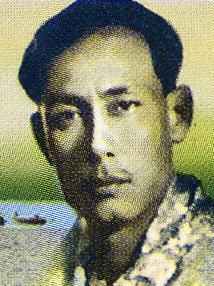
S. D. Burman, Best Music Director

Usha Kiran, Best Supporting Actress

Best Film	Best Director
Boot Polish – R. K. Films	Bimal Roy – Parineeta
Best Actor	Best Actress
Bharat Bhushan – Shri Chaitanya Mahaprabhu as Vishvambhar Mishra / Chaitanya Mahaprabhu	Meena Kumari – Parineeta as Lalita
Best Supporting Actor	Best Supporting Actress
David – Boot Polish as John	Usha Kiran – Baadbaan as Mohnia
Best Story	Best Music Director
Mukhram Sharma – Aulad	S. D. Burman – Taxi Driver for Jaaye To Jaaye Kahaan

== Technical awards ==
Best Cinematography	Best Sound Recordist
Tara Dutt – Boot Polish	Ishan Ghosh – Jeewan Jyoti

== Superlatives ==
The following films had multiple wins

Movie	Awards
Boot Polish	3
Parineeta	2
