= Madhumati =

1958 film by Bimal Roy

- Theatrical poster
- Directed by: Bimal Roy
- Screenplay by: Ritwik Ghatak; Rajinder Singh Bedi
- Story by: Ritwik Ghatak
- Produced by: Bimal Roy
- Starring: Vyjayanthimala; Dilip Kumar; Pran; Johnny Walker
- Cinematography: Dilip Gupta
- Edited by: Hrishikesh Mukherjee
- Music by: Salil Chowdhury
- Production company: Bimal Roy Productions
- Release date: 12 September 1958
- Running time: 166 minutes
- Country: India
- Language: Hindi
- Budget: est. ₹8 million
- Box office: est. ₹40 million

Madhumati is a 1958 Indian Hindi-language paranormal romance film directed and produced by Bimal Roy, with a story and screenplay written by Ritwik Ghatak. The film stars Vyjayanthimala and Dilip Kumar in the lead roles, with Pran and Johnny Walker in supporting roles. The plot focuses on Anand, a modern man who falls in love with a tribal woman named Madhumati. However, they face challenges in their relationship finally leading to a paranormal consequence. The film was ranked 11th in the Outlook Magazine's 25 leading Indian directors' poll for selecting Bollywood's greatest films in 2003.

Madhumati was filmed in various Indian locations, including Ranikhet, Ghorakhal, Vaitarna Dam and Aarey Forest. The soundtrack album was composed by Salil Chowdhury and the lyrics were written by Shailendra. The film was released on 12 September 1958. It earned ₹40 million in India, became the highest-grossing Indian film of the year, and one of the most commercially successful and influential Indian films of its time.

Madhumati was one of the earliest films to deal with reincarnation, and was described by analysts as a potboiler that has a gothic and noir feel to it. It inspired later regional and international films that have reincarnation-based themes. It led the 6th Filmfare Awards with 12 nominations and won 9 awards including Best Film, Best Director for Roy, Best Music Director for Chaudhary, Best Female Playback Singer for Mangeshkar—the most awards for a film at that time—a record that it maintained for a record 37 years. It also won the National Film Award for Best Feature Film in Hindi. It was later remade in Malayalam as Vanadevatha (1976).

== Plot ==
On a stormy night, engineer Devendra drives down a hill road with his friend to fetch his wife and child from a railway station. A landslide blocks their path and they take shelter in an old mansion. Devendra finds the house eerily familiar. In the large front room, he finds an old portrait, which he recognizes. He’s joined by his friend and the old caretaker. Devendra, experiencing flashbacks of another life, sits down to tell his story while the storm rages outside.

Anand is the new manager of Shyamnagar Timber Estate. An artist in his spare time, he travels to the hills and falls in love with Madhumati, a Kumaoni tribal woman whose songs have haunted him from a distance. Anand's employer, Raja Ugra Narain is a ruthless, arrogant man; Anand, who refuses to bend to his will unlike others, is on the receiving end of his wrath. Anand has enemies among his staff. After he’s sent away on an errand, he returns to find that Madhumati has disappeared. He learns that she has been taken to Ugra Narain and confronts him, but his men beat him unconscious. While taking Anand's body out of the palace, they come across Madhumati's father, who fights to stop his own daughter's death. Although he comes out on top in the fight, he dies on the road shortly after, while Charandas hides and takes Anand's body to a hospital.

Anand lives but his mind wanders. One day, he meets a woman who looks exactly like Madhumati. She introduces herself as Madhavi but Anand refuses to believe her. He tries to reason with her and is beaten by her companions. Later, Madhavi finds a sketch of Madhumati and realizes Anand was telling the truth. She takes the sketch with her and tries to learn his story. Meanwhile, Anand is haunted by the spirit of Madhumati, who tells him Ugra Narain is responsible for her death. He appeals to Madhavi, who agrees to pose as Madhumati before Ugra Narain and make him confess to her murder.

Anand returns to Ugra Narain's palace and seeks permission to paint a portrait of him the next evening. The day after, at the stroke of eight, Ugra Narain sees Madhavi posing as Madhumati in front of him. Ugra Narain is shaken; he confesses his part in her death and is arrested by police waiting outside the room. Anand realizes that the questions Madhavi posed to Ugra Narain, especially about Madhumati 's burial place, were things she could not have known; even Anand did not know. Madhavi smiles and moves towards the stairs. The real Madhavi, dressed as Madhumati, then rushes into the room. She is late because her car broke down on the way. Anand realizes he saw Madhumati's ghost and not Madhavi. He runs to the terrace, where the ghost beckons to him. Madhumati had fallen from the same terrace, trying to escape Ugra Narain. Anand follows the ghost and falls to his death.

After telling the story of Anand and Madhumati, Devendra receives news that the train on which his wife was traveling has met with an accident. The road is cleared and they rush to the station. Devendra walks through the station fearing the worst but is relieved to see his wife Radha, emerging from the train unharmed. Radha is the reincarnation of Madhumati, and Devendra informs her, based on his recent recollections, that they have been partners through several births.

== Cast ==
- Vyjayanthimala as Madhumati/Madhavi/Radha (triple role)
- Dilip Kumar as Devendra / Anand
- Johnny Walker as Charandas
- Pran as Raja Ugra Narain
- Jayant as Pawan Raja, Madhumati's father
- Ramayan Tiwari as Bir Singh
- Tarun Bose as Devendra's colleague
- Bhudo Advani as Baba
- Jagdish Raj as Police captain

== Production ==
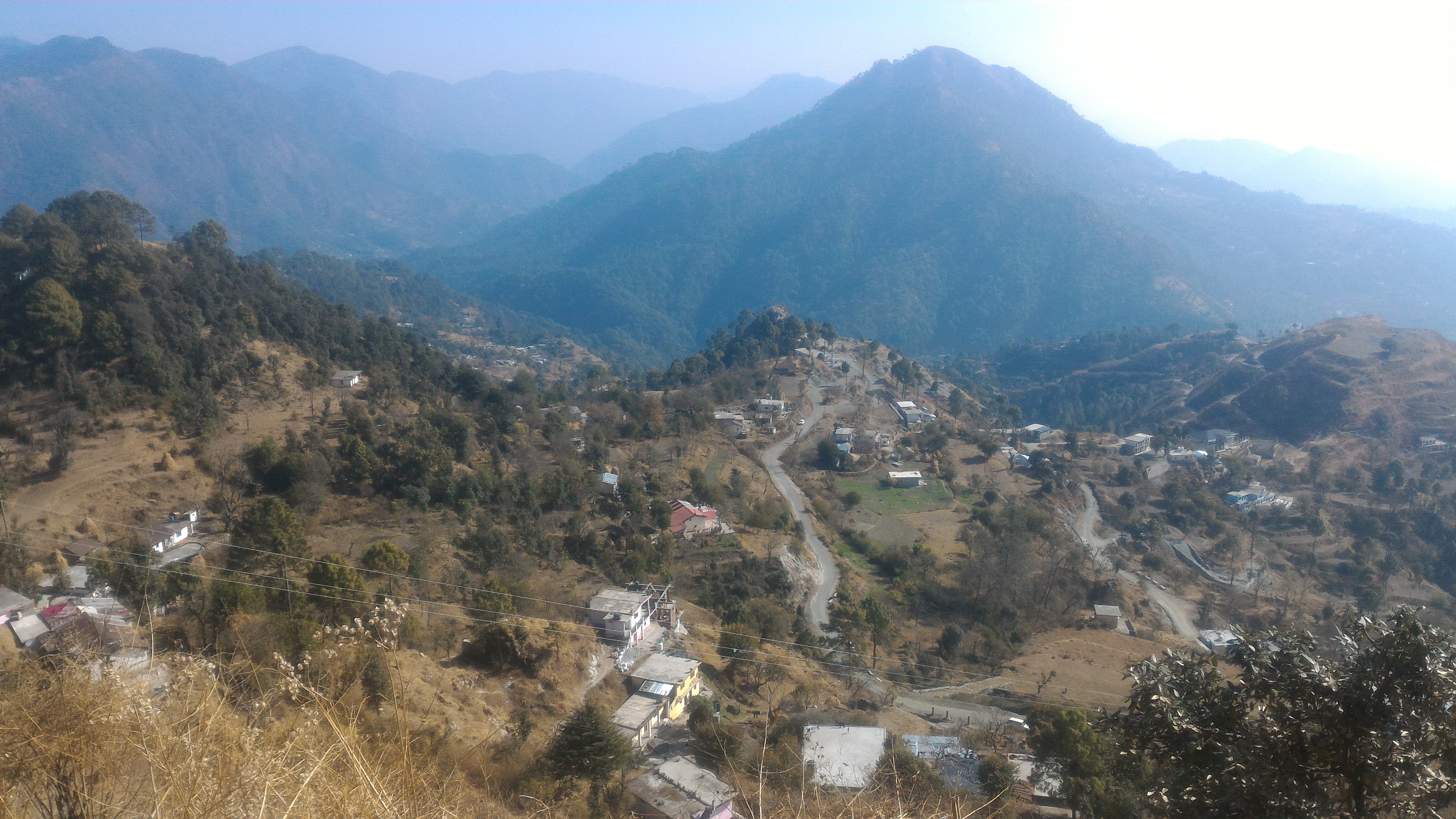
The Ghorakhal mountain range, one of the filming locations.

Bengali filmmaker Bimal Roy's 1955 film Devdas was commercially unsuccessful, jeopardising his company Bimal Roy Productions; he needed a commercial success to survive. The story of Madhumati was written by the Bengali filmmaker Ritwik Ghatak. He shared the story with Roy, who immediately liked it and started developing the film with Debu Sen as the assistant director. The dialogues were written by Rajinder Singh Bedi in the Urdu script. Manohari Singh was selected for composing the film's music after Roy heard him playing in Kolkata.

Roy had previously signed Vyjayanthimala and Dilip Kumar for two films. The first, Devdas, based on the eponymous novel, received much critical acclaim and a National Film Award for Best Feature Film in Hindi despite being commercially unsuccessful. Kumar and Vyjayanthimala were selected to play the lead roles in Madhumati. The former was eager to work again with Roy after their previous film Devdas and accepted the role. Vyjayanthimala agreed to work on the film after learning that Pran was a part of the cast.

Unlike another film noir, which was mostly filmed indoors, Roy decided to film Madhumati outdoors and at a hill station. It had a six-week schedule at a location in Ranikhet, Nainital. Some scenes were filmed in Ghorakhal near Nainital. When the negatives were developed, most of the footage was found to be fogged. Since a reshoot in far-away Uttarakhand was not possible, sets were created near Vaitarna Dam, Igatpuri. The art direction team, led by Sudhendu Roy, created fake pine trees, which were planted to match the location in Nainital. A large part of the film was filmed in Aarey Forest, a small forested area in Mumbai. A scene in which Dilip Kumar looks for Vyjayanthimala in the woods was filmed in Igatpuri. The foggy effect was recreated using gas bombs. The costumes of the film were designed by Yadugiri Devi, Vyjayanthimala's grandmother; these were later approved by the art director Sudhendu Roy. Vyjayanthimala wore silver jewelry from her collection in the film. The actress had also hurt her foot while dancing.

Due to Madhumati's extensive outdoor shooting, the film went over budget by ₹8 million, adding to the troubles of Bimal Roy Productions, which organized a film preview and lunch for the distributors. Roy told them about the company's financial problems and that he had decided to forego ₹70,000 of his director's fee to make up for the loss. All of the distributors pitched in with money and made up for the deficit.

== Themes ==
Film critics and academics have analyzed Madhumati in several ways. In the book The Woman Who Pretended to Be Who She Was: Myths of Self-Imitation, Indologist Wendy Doniger said reviewers of the late 1950s had described the film's theme as "a conventional plot, a typical Hindi [f]ilm [p]otboiler, in which the hero experiences a sense of déjà vu leading to his flashback of a former life". In the book Bollywood Cinema: Temples of Desire, Vijay Mishra states that the film has a "gothic noir" feel. According to Mishra, there is a more direct relationship between rebirth, spirits, and ghosts, which naturalizes the Indian Gothic.

Analysts from the University of Iowa compare the initial meeting of the main characters, stating that it resembles the meeting in Raj Kapoor's film Ram Teri Ganga Maili (1984), where the woman "stands in for nature and unspoiled folk tradition and the villain for exploitative (capitalist) culture, with the hero as an intermediary". They also write, "Anand's own egalitarian progressivism, coupled with his sympathy for Madhumati and her family, soon sets him on a collision course with the Raja, who takes revenge through a malevolent scheme".

According to Jayson Beaster-Jones and Natalie Sarrazin, Madhumati was one of the first Hindi films to use the now-common "narrative of the plain-based hero entering the mountains and being seduced by a tribal girl." Rajadhyaksha said the imagery is similar to that of the film Ajantrik (1957), writing that Madhumati links "the beautiful Madhumati with nature and tribal cultures beyond the grasp of capitalist appropriation". Film critic Bharati Pradhan said Madhumati stepped away from "the standard Roy themes of social realism as seen in his Do Bigha Zameen (1953), Biraj Bahu (1954) and Devdas (1955)".

== Music ==
The Madhumati soundtrack features 11 songs composed by Salil Chowdhury. Shailendra wrote the lyrics and Mukesh, Lata Mangeshkar, Manna Dey, Mohammed Rafi, Mubarak Begum, Asha Bhosle, Sabita Chowdhury, Ghulam Mohammed, and Dwijen Mukhopadhyay provided the vocals. The music was composed before the lyrics were written. Folk music sung in the tea gardens of Assam was used in the soundtrack and Polish folk music was used for the song "Dil Tadap Tadap Ke Keh Raha Hai", which was adapted from the 18th century Silesian song "Szla Dzieweczka do Gajeczka". The song "Aaja Re Pardesi" was adapted from the background score of Jagte Raho (1956). Dinesh Raheja, writing for Rediff.com, said, "The music and the tonal correctness of the performances hold us in thrall".

The soundtrack of Madhumati became the best-selling Hindi film soundtrack of 1958. Salil Chowdhury won his first Filmfare Award for Best Music Director. Suhana Safar Aur Yeh Mausam Haseen is one of the most popular songs by recording artist Mukesh and is regularly played at dandiya functions. Filmfare started giving the best playback singer award in this year and Lata Mangeshkar won this award for the song "Aaja re Pardesi". She thus became the first singer ever to win the Filmfare award for a playback singer since, in the beginning, there was only one award given to a playback singer, male and female singers included.

All lyrics are written by Shailendra; all music is composed by Salil Chowdhury.

Original tracklist
No.	Title	Singer(s)	Length
1.	"Dil Tadap Tadap Ke Kah Raha"	Mukesh, Lata Mangeshkar	03:27
2.	"Suhana Safar Aur Yeh Mausam"	Mukesh	03:49
3.	"Aaja Re Pardesi" (Raga Bageshri)	Lata Mangeshkar	04:30
4.	"Chadh Gayo Papi Bichhua"	Lata Mangeshkar, Manna Dey	05:54
5.	"Ghadi Ghadi Mera Dil Dhadke" (Raga Bageshri)	Lata Mangeshkar	03:12
6.	"Toote Huye Khwabon Ne" (Raga Darbari)	Mohammad Rafi	03:18
7.	"Zulmi Sang Ankh Ladi Re"	Lata Mangeshkar	03:27
8.	"Ham Haal E Dil Sunaenge"	Mubarak Begum	03:25
9.	"Kancha Le Kanchi Lai Lajo"	Asha Bhosle, Sabita Chowdhury, Ghulam Mohammad	03:24
10.	"Tan Jale Man Jalta Rahe"	Dwijen Mukhopadhyay	03:22
11.	"Jangal Mein Mor Nacha"	Mohammad Rafi	03:08

== Release ==
Madhumati premiered at the Roxy Cinema near Opera House, Mumbai on 12 September 1958; the film was a huge blockbuster and helped Bimal Roy Productions recover its losses. It became the first Indian film to be released abroad after its release in the Karlovy Vary International Film Festival Theatre in Czechoslovakia. According to Gowri Ramnarayan of The Hindu, "Dilip Kumar faced the camera, while Soviet actress Tatyana Konjuchova, switched on the camera. Polish actress Barbara Połomska acted as clapper-boy." On 18 April 2010, the film was screened at the South Indian Film Chamber Theatre for the Dignity Film Festival held in Chennai; other films also screened included Kadhalikka Neramillai (1964), Server Sundaram (1964), Anbe Vaa (1966) and Thillana Mohanambal (1968).

Madhumati was the highest-grossing Indian film of 1958. It grossed ₹40 million ($8.4 million), including a net income of ₹20 million. Adjusted for inflation, its gross was equivalent to $94 million (₹4.78 billion) in 2016.

== Critical reception ==
Writing for Rediff.com, Dinesh Raheja noted how Madhumati "beguile[s] the senses" while describing it as "the grandmother of such famous reincarnation films Milan (1967), Mehbooba (1976), Karz (1980), Kudrat (1981), Janam Janam (1988), Karan Arjun (1995)" and Om Shanti Om (2007)" . Writing for Filmfare, Meghna Gulzar calls Madhumati "poetry in black-and-white" and praises Roy, writing "the songs and their picturization – Bimal Da's mastery exudes in every frame". She described the song Aaja Re Pardesi as "mysterious and melancholic". According to Philip Lutgendorf of The University of Iowa, the film sustains its suspense even with the flashback-within-the-flashback frame story, has socio-realistic themes, and is similar to the Alfred Hitchcock films Rebecca (1940) and Vertigo (1958). Lutgendorf praised the performances of Kumar and Vyjayanthimala, and said, "Kumar gives an appropriately haunted performance as the two incarnations of Devendra / Anand, and Vyjayanthimala is alternately earthy and ethereal in the various permutations of the title character".

Vijay Lokapally from The Hindu praises Chowdhury's music, calling it the "soul of the movie" and "enchanting and timeless". Writing for Upperstall.com, Karan Bali commended Roy's ability to "recreate just the right mood and ambiance", especially praising few scenes as "luscious romantic interludes outdoors or the swinging chandeliers", "dark shadows within the haveli" and "several documentary like establishing shots". Bali's view is shared by Manisha Lakhe of Daily News and Analysis, who wrote, "Bimal Roy's masterstrokes are evident when you watch the long shadows of trees falling on that stone with fascination".

== Accolades ==
Madhumati led the 6th Filmfare Awards with 12 nominations and won 9 awards, a record it held for 37 years. Since its release, it had multiple screenings at the Tenth Bite – The Mango Film Festival (2004), the 4th Pune International Film Festival (2006) and the Toronto International Film Festival (2011).

Vyjayanthimala become the first ever actor to receive dual nominations in an acting category in the same year for her work in Madhumati and Sadhna, winning for the latter. The nominations also makes her the first-ever multi-nominee across all categories, a record she shares with Mukhram Sharma. This win also makes her the first performer in Filmfare history to win in both leading and supporting categories. The film got music director Salil Choudhary and playback singer Lata Mangeshkar, their career-first Filmfare awards respectively. Before this there was no Filmfare award for female playback singers.

Madhumati was selected as India's official submission for Best Foreign Language Film at the 31st Academy Awards, but it was not nominated.

Awards & Nominations for Madhumati
Awards	Category	Nominee	Result	Ref.
6th National Film Awards	Best Feature Film in Hindi	Bimal Roy	Won	
6th Filmfare Awards	Best Film	Bimal Roy	Won	
6th Filmfare Awards	Best Director	Bimal Roy	Won	
6th Filmfare Awards	Best Actor	Dilip Kumar	Nominated	
6th Filmfare Awards	Best Actress	Vyjayanthimala	Nominated	
6th Filmfare Awards	Best Supporting Actor	Johnny Walker	Won	
6th Filmfare Awards	Best Music Director	Salil Chowdhury	Won	
6th Filmfare Awards	Best Female Playback Singer	Lata Mangeshkar	Won	
6th Filmfare Awards	Best Story	Ritwik Ghatak	Nominated	
6th Filmfare Awards	Best Dialogue	Rajinder Singh Bedi	Won	
6th Filmfare Awards	Best Art Direction	Sudhendu Roy	Won	
6th Filmfare Awards	Best Cinematographer	Dilip Gupta	Won	
6th Filmfare Awards	Best Editing	Hrishikesh Mukherjee	Won	

== Legacy ==
Madhumati's intricate web of reincarnation, suspense and thrill against a traditional romantic setup between Dilip Saab and Vyjayanthimala, treated with gorgeous cinematography and exquisite songs, continues to inspire Bollywood to this date.

— Sukanya Varma of Rediff.com on Madhumati

Madhumati became a source of inspiration for many later works dealing with reincarnation in Indian cinema, Indian television, and perhaps world cinema. According to Javed Akhtar, Madhumati is one among the top three or four romantic films ever made in Hindi cinema. He was quoted by Akshay Manwani of Daily News and Analysis as saying, "Even after Bimal Roy's death, Madhumati's success provided for his family. The earning from this film continue[s] even today. It is a terrific film." According to Vyjayanthimala, who played the film's titular character, Madhumati was one of the "most memorable films" of her career.

Wendy Doniger believes that Madhumati may have inspired the American film The Reincarnation of Peter Proud (1975), which in turn was remade into the Hindi film Karz (1980); both of them dealt with reincarnation and have been influential in their respective cultures. Karan Bali notes that the famous "crossing of paths" in Dilwale Dulhania Le Jayenge (1995), where Shah Rukh Khan and Kajol cross each other's paths without noticing the other until the end of the sequence, is present in Madhumati, which was produced 37 years earlier. Parts of the Hindi film Om Shanti Om (2007) including the whole climax sequence were heavily inspired from Madhumati, which led to Bimal Roy's daughter Rinki Bhattacharya accusing the latter film's producers of plagiarism and threatening them with legal action.

In celebration of the 50th anniversary of the film, the Bimal Roy Foundation, headed by Roy's daughter Rinki Bhattacharya, hosted a screening of Madhumati at the Globus Cinema in Mumbai on 11 April 2008. The occasion saw the reunion of the film's cast, including Vyjayanthimala. Subsequently, Bhattacharya published a book about the making of the film, titled Bimal Roy's Madhumati: Untold Stories from Behind the Scenes.
