= Ek Hi Rasta (1956 film) =

Ek-Hi-Rasta
- Poster
- Directed by: B. R. Chopra
- Written by: Mukhram Sharma
- Screenplay by: Mukhram Sharma
- Story by: Mukhram Sharma
- Produced by: B. R. Chopra
- Starring: Ashok Kumar; Sunil Dutt; Meena Kumari; Daisy Irani; Jeevan; Shrinath
- Cinematography: M. N. Malhotra
- Edited by: Pran Mehra
- Music by: Hemanta Mukherjee
- Production company: B. R. Films
- Distributed by: B. R. Films
- Release date: 13 April 1956
- Country: India
- Language: Hindi

Ek-Hi-Rasta (lit. 'Only one way') is a 1956 family-drama Indian Hindi film directed and produced by B. R. Chopra. It starred Sunil Dutt, Meena Kumari, Ashok Kumar, Daisy Irani, Jeevan and Shrinath in main roles. The music for the film was scored by Hemanta Mukherjee. Having directed a few films earlier, Chopra formed his own production house B.R. Films in 1955 and Ek-Hi-Rasta was the first film produced under this banner. The film was remade in Telugu as Kumkuma Rekha (1960) and in Tamil as Pudhiya Pathai (1960).

== Plot ==
The film starts with the portrayal of a happily married couple, Amar and Malti who have a son, Raja. Amar and Malti are both orphans and hence are sympathetic towards orphans generally. Prakash is a rich bachelor businessman for whom Amar works. While working in Prakash's factory, Amar catches another worker Munshi stealing money from the factory locker.

To take revenge for his humiliation at the hands of Amar, Munshi murders him. To escape his depression over the loss, Prakash begins helping Malti and her child. Munshi tries to humiliate the family by spreading rumors of an affair between Prakash and Malti in public. To save the honour of Malti, Prakash marries her. The child Raja however refuses to accept Prakash as his father. Munshi provokes Raja against Prakash and claims that Prakash was the real murderer of Amar. Out of anger, Raja tries to shoot Prakash but fails. Raja runs away from home carrying with him the infant son of Prakash and Malti. Prakash rescues the two children from the railway track. After being convinced of Prakash's sincerity, Raja accepts him as his father

== Soundtrack ==
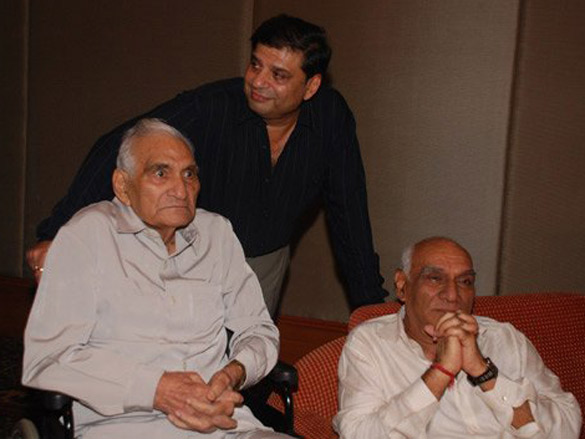
Baldev Raj Chopra (sitting left) and Yash Chopra (at the right)

The music for the songs was composed by Hemanta Mukherjee. He also sang few of the songs himself, of which "Chali Gori Pi Se Milan Ko Chali" was based on Bhairavi raga.

Soundtracks
No.	Title	Singer(s)	Length
1.	"Bade Bhaiyya Laaye Hain London"	Asha Bhosle	8:07
2.	"Bhola Bachpan Dukhi Jawani"	Hemanta Mukherjee and Lata Mangeshkar	2:22
3.	"Bhola Bachpan Dukhi Jawani (2)"	Lata Mangeshkar	5:10
4.	"Chali Gori Pi Se Milan Ko Chali"	Hemanta Mukherjee	5:44
5.	"Chamaka Ban Kar Aman Ka Taara"	Hemanta Mukherjee and Lata Mangeshkar	6:51
6.	"Kaisi Lagi Kaisi Lagi Jaaye"	Asha Bhosle and Usha Mangeshkar	6:49
7.	"Sanware Salone Aaye Din Bahaar Ke"	Hemanta Mukherjee and Lata Mangeshkar	1:16
8.	"Udale Hain Mere Gham Ki Hansi"	Lata Mangeshkar	2:85

== Production ==
The film was directed and produced by B. R. Chopra under the B. R. films banner. Founded in 1955, the production house's first creation was this film.

The music was directed by well known singer Hemanta Mukherjee, with the lyrics written by one of the dominating musical forces in Indian Cinema, Majrooh Sultanpuri. The story, along with the screenplay and dialogue were written by Mukhram Sharma. Assistant directors included Balbir Kumar, O. P. Bedi and B. R. Chopra's brother, Yash Chopra.

== Reception ==
The film proved to be successful at the box office and was screened for more than 25 weeks; which was called "Jubilee Hit". The banner went on to produce many more successful films such as Naya Daur (1957), Sadhana (1958), Dhool Ka Phool (1959), Waqt (1965) and more. Child actress Daisy Irani's role as Raja was also well appreciated. She was also seen in Chopra's next film Naya Daur.
