= Aulad =

Aulad may refer to:

- Aulad (1954 film), an Indian drama film by Mohan Sehgal
- Aulad (1962 film), a Pakistani Urdu-language film by S. M. Yusuf
- Aulad (1968 film), an Indian drama film by Kundan Kumar
- Aulad (1987 film), an Indian drama film by Vijay Sadanah
- Aulaad (TV series), a 2020–2021 Pakistani series directed by Aabis Raza
