= Pyaar Kiya To Darna Kya =

Pyaar Kiya To Darna Kya is a Hindi-Urdu phrase meaning "I have loved, so what is there to fear?". It may refer to:

- "Pyar Kiya To Darna Kya", a song from the Indian film Mughal-e-Azam (1960)
- Pyaar Kiya To Darna Kya (1963 film), directed by B. S. Ranga and starring Shammi Kapoor
- Pyaar Kiya To Darna Kya (1998 film), directed by Sohail Khan and starring Salman Khan, Kajol and Arbaaz Khan
