= Sadhna (film) =

- Directed by: B.R. Chopra
- Written by: Mukhram Sharma
- Produced by: B.R. Chopra
- Starring: Vyjayanthimala; Sunil Dutt; Leela Chitnis; S.Balber
- Cinematography: M. N. Malhotra
- Edited by: Pran Mehra
- Music by: Datta Naik
- Distributed by: B. R. Films
- Release date: 1958
- Running time: 137 minutes
- Country: India
- Language: Hindi
- Box office: ₹1.6 Crore ($224,000)

Sadhna (Hindi: साधना; Urdu: سادھنا; translation: Realize, also transliterated as Sadhana) is a 1958 Black-and-white Hindi film aiming at social reform, produced and directed by B. R. Chopra. The film stars Vyjayanthimala and Sunil Dutt in the lead with Leela Chitnis, Radhakrishan, Manmohan Krishna, Uma Dutt and Ravikant, forming an ensemble cast. The story, screenplay and dialogue were penned by Mukhram Sharma. The film revolves around Champa (Vyjayanthimala), a prostitute and her love affair with Mohan, a college teacher(Lecturer)(Sunil Dutt).

== Theme ==
The film has the central theme of rehabilitation of prostitutes and bringing them into mainstream society, which was then a bold and controversial topic. Furthermore, the film also questioned society's view of prostitution.

== Synopsis ==
The story revolves around Mohan, who is a lecturer in a local college and lives with his aged mother. Incidentally, it is shown in the beginning that he is giving a lecture in his class based on the classic play, Mṛichchhakatika which features the story of a nobleman, Charudatt, who falls in love with Vasantsena, a prostitute. This appears to leave a deep impact on the tender mind of a young Mohan, as will be seen from the progress of the story and its eventual culmination. His old mother would like him to get married since she wanted him to settle down before she dies. But, Mohan was opposed to this as he didn't want to be married so early. One day, while coming down the stairs, his mother, who was running high fever, slips and falls and loses consciousness. Despite being delirious with fever, she mumbles to see a daughter-in-law. The neighbor, Jeevan offers to help and brings a woman, Rajni, who is then introduced to his mother as the would-be daughter-in-law. Now his mother's health has improved and his mother is very happy with Rajni, with her beauty and good behavior, she accepts her as her prospective daughter-in-law and even gives her the family jewels to dress in. Rajni is deeply moved after putting on the ornaments and the bridal saree but is shattered when her customers want her to perform in the bridal attire. Mohan falls for the beauty and charm of 'Rajni'. Then mother and son receive the earth shattering news that Rajini is actually a prostitute, Champabai. The eventual acceptance of 'Rajni' by Mohan's mother and her assimilation into the household, after the former prostitute's metamorphosis on falling in love with Mohan, forms the crux of the story.

== Plot ==
Professor Mohan (Sunil Dutt) is a morally upright, honest young man living with his beloved mother (Leela Chitnis), who is single-minded in her pursuit of one goal: her son's marriage. Mohan teaches literature and poetry at a nearby college. During one lesson from a play composed by the medieval play-write, Shudraka about a nobleman who has fallen for a prostitute, he makes his abhorrent feelings about dancing girls quite clear.

Not long after, his mother, who is running a fever, falls down the stairs in their home and is unconscious. The doctor is called, injections are given, the neighbors all come crowding in, and much shaking of the head ensues, but she finally regains her senses long enough to say this, that she wants him to get married. The doctor pronounces his judgment that with the medication, she will get better; but the packed-in neighbors are much more gloomy. They all file out, still muttering amongst themselves.

One of the neighbors, Jeevan (Radhakrishan), has creditors hounding him, and he sees a little opportunity to make some money. He tells Mohan that he knows a girl who might be persuaded to pose as his fiancee for a few days, but her father will probably want money. Mohan, of course, is willing at this point to do anything and agrees to give Jeevan whatever he wants. Jeevan goes to see Champabai (Vyjayanthimala), a local prostitute. He negotiates a price with her for posing as Mohan's fiancee for the evening. Reluctantly, she puts on an ordinary sari and he takes her to see his mother and meet Mohan. Champbai, who was introduced as 'Rajni' by Jeevan before his mother puts up a credible demure act so as to impress her.

Champa, for her part, is unimpressed by either mother or son and makes fun of them when she returns to the Kotha. Jeevan gives her the agreed amount, which is promptly pocketed by the brothel owner, Lallubhai (Manmohan Krishna).

The next day, Mohan's mom asks to see Rajni (Vyjayanthimala) again, and Mohan asks Jeevan to bring her again that evening. Jeevan has told Mohan that she is the daughter of a distant relative. In any case, Champa / Rajni is bowled over by the expensive jewelry that Mohan's mom shows her as the family bride-to-be. She decides to forgo her fee, to Jeevan's dismay, in favor of pretending to have real feelings for Mohan until she can find an opportunity to steal it. She soon does, as one day Mohan's mom gives her the bridal sari and jewelry to take home and try on and present herself as a bride before her.

She puts on the bridal outfit and comes before her customers that evening, but they make fun of her and ask her to perform as a bride/devi. She flees in humiliation and the jewels she put on so happily moments before now feel like they are scalding her. Her customers sing a lively qawwali to try and coax her out. But when she emerges, this time in her usual dance attire, they laugh at her again and she realizes that she means nothing to them, they don't think of her as a person with feelings or emotions. But, there is a life changing transformation in her when she realizes the respect and love a bride commands in a household. The next day, subdued, she brings back the jewelry and bridal sari to Mohan's mom, who is recovering nicely. Her warm greeting and kind affection make her feel even worse. Subconsciously, both Mohan and 'Rajni' had fallen for each other.

Meanwhile, Mohan wants to speak to her father. Jeevan puts him off, and he returns home to find Rajni there. He expresses his affection gently, and she tells him that she is not worthy of his feelings. She leaves sad, and the next evening refuses to dance for her customers. Lallu's threats don't move her either, and she throws him out after an impassioned speech about how he has been living off her earnings for years. He goes but vows that he will make her dance in the bazaar.

She goes to see Jeevan and makes him promise that he won't tell Mohan the truth about her, not because she thinks she has a future with him, but because she can't bear to become a fallen woman in his eyes. Soon after that, Mohan sees Rajni walking in the street. When he calls her name, she flees, and he follows her to the 'Kotha'. Mohan is horrified and angry when the people of the bazaar tell him that she is Champabai, a prostitute and not Rajni. He tells his bewildered mother that he will never see Rajni again.

Champa later writes a letter to Mohan that she wants to see him one last time at midnight outside his house. Mohan tears up the letter but still goes outside to find Champa standing there. He asks her why she wanted to see him and tells her to go away. She tells him that she is Champa and she is very sorry for cheating on both him and his mother. He immediately tells her that her profession is to cheat and betray people as she is a prostitute. She tells him that she was forced to become one but he doesn't pay heed to her. She leaves but gets kidnapped by Lallu and his cohort. But, hearing her cries Mohan saves her in the nick of time. He takes her back to his house and helps her regain consciousness. He asks her who they were and why they were kidnapping her. She tells him that they were MEN and they don't ask for consent on any matter. She then tells him how she was forced to become a prostitute after she was left alone in the world after her mother died suffering without any medicines. After hearing her story, Mohan tells her that he will marry her as Champa and not as Rajni. She becomes very delighted to hear this but tells him to go home immediately as she didn't want his mother to get humiliated knowing that her son goes to a prostitute's house.

Meanwhile, Lallu tells Mohan's mother that Rajni is actually Champabai, a prostitute. Shellshocked, she tells him to get out of her house and asks Mohan whether what Lallu said was true. Mohan's affirmation moves the ground under her feet and makes her very angry. At that time, Champa arrives at Mohan's house to take the blessings of Mohan's mother one last time before she leaves them for good, but she rudely asks her to leave. Lallu tells her that no gentleman would accept her but her customers will gleefully accept her back. Realizing this, Champa tells Lallu with tears in her eyes that she neither will be accepted by anyone nor does she deserve any other place than the bazaar. She turns to go out of the house when something irrevocably changes in Mohan's mother, who holds her back and tells her that she no longer is a prostitute after entering a household, which is like the flowing Ganges and she will not let her daughter-in-law go anywhere. Champa is overwhelmed and breaks down with tears of gratitude. The film ends on a happy note with Champa and Mohan reuniting.

== Cast ==
- Vyjayanthimala as Champabai / Champa / Rajni
- Sunil Dutt as Professor Mohan
- Leela Chitnis as Mohan's mother
- Radhakrishan as Jeevan Ram
- Manmohan Krishna as Lallu bai
- Uma Dutt as Pahelwan
- Moolchand as Sunder Lal
- Ravikant as Doctor
- S.Balber act on Qawwali Aaj Kyon Humse Parda Hai
- Uma Bhende
- Nazir Kashmiri
- Lala Nazir
- C. L. Shah
- Munshi Munakka
- Kathana
- Nissar
- Arjun
- Rajesh
- Nandini Bhaktasavala
- Menaka
- Jamuna

== Crew ==
Art Department

- Sant Singh as the Art director
- R.G. Gaekwad as the assistant art director

Sound Department

- Jaywant S. Worlikar as the Audiographer
- S. N. Modi as the assistant audiographer
- S. N. Sharma as the assistant audiographer

Makeup Department

- Shanker Ram Jadhav as the Make-up artist
- Ram Singh as the assistant make-up artist

Costume and Wardrobe Department

- Vasant as the Costume designer

Camera and Electrical Department

- Dharam Chopra as the Camera operator
- Roshanlal Sharma as the Unit still photographer
- Vithal Narayan as the Focus puller
- P. R. L. Raman as the Clapper loader

Editorial Department

- Abba Joshi as the film processing
- Krishnan Sachdeva as the assistant editor

Second Unit Director or Assistant Director

- O. P. Bedi as the Assistant director
- Yash Chopra as the Assistant director
- Balbir Kumar as the Assistant director

Other crew

- G. D. Bhadsavle as the Publicist
- Jaikishan as the Production assistant
- Laxmi Narayan Yadav as the Production assistant
- C. L. Kapoor as the Production executive
- C. V. K. Sastry as the Production Controller
- Mohanlal Harkishenlal Sibal as the Presenter
- B. Sohanlal as the Choreographer
- Bhadrakumar Yagnik as the Public relations

== Production ==
=== Casting ===
For the lead role of Champa bai, who is a prostitute, the initial consideration for that role was actress Nimmi, but she hesitated to enact a role of a prostitute and rejected the offer. Later, actress Vyjayanthimala, who previously worked with B.R. Chopra in Naya Daur (1957), agreed to be part of the film immediately after hearing the script from the director. Furthermore, Yash Chopra, the younger brother of B.R. Chopra, was an assistant director during the making of Sadhna. B. R. Chopra later gave him his break as a director the next year with Dhool Ka Phool (1959).

== Soundtrack ==
Sadhna

Soundtrack album by Datta Naik
- Released: 1958
- Recorded: Minoo Katrak
- Genre: Film soundtrack
- Label: The Gramophone Company of India
- Producer: Datta Naik

Datta Naik chronology
Hum Panchhi Ek Daal Ke (1957)	Sadhna (1958)	Dhool Ka Phool (1959)

The film's soundtrack was composed by Datta Naik, who had a breakthrough this album. Later on, he composed some of the best Bollywood songs in the film Dhool Ka Phool (1957) and Aag Aur Daag (1970).

The lyrics were provided by Sahir Ludhianvi and the vocals were provided by Lata Mangeshkar, Mohammed Rafi, S. Balber (musician)|S. Balber, Geeta Dutt and Asha Bhosle.

No.	Song	Singers	Picturization	Length (m:ss)	Lyrics	Notes
1	"Aurat Ne Janam Diya Mardon Ko"	Lata Mangeshkar	Featuring actress Vyjayanthimala	05:48	Sahir Ludhianvi	
2	"Kahoji Tum Kya Kya Kharidoge"	Lata Mangeshkar	Mujras on actress Vyjayanthimala	04:10	Sahir Ludhianvi	
3	"Aaj Kyon Humse Parda Hai"	Mohammed Rafi, S. Balber	featuring actress Vyjayanthimala	04:59	Sahir Ludhianvi	
4	"Tora Manva Kyon Ghabraye"	Geeta Dutt	Featuring actress Vyjayanthimala, Leela Chitnis and Sunil Dutt	04:34	Sahir Ludhianvi	Female version
5	"Tora Manva Kyon Ghabraye"	Mohammed Rafi	Featuring actress Vyjayanthimala, Leela Chitnis, and Sunil Dutt	04:34	Sahir Ludhianvi	Male version
6	"Sambhal Aye Dil"	Mohammed Rafi, Asha Bhosle	Featuring actress Vyjayanthimala and Sunil Dutt	03:27	Sahir Ludhianvi	
7	"Aise Vaise Thikane Pe Jana Bura Hai"	Lata Mangeshkar	Featuring the lead pair	05:53	Sahir Ludhianvi	

== Reception ==
=== Critical ===
Sadhna received largely positive reviews from critics and was one of the most critically acclaimed films of the year. Vijay Lokapally from The Hindu said: "Among the great movies made on the subject of helpless women versus society, Sadhna holds its own for its realistic portrayal and treatment of a subject, so aesthetically documented by Chopra and Vyjayanthimala". While actress Vyjayanthimala was praised by the reviewer, whose performance was described as "gorgeous when she entertains the clients at her kotha" and "stunningly restrained when she assumes the character of a prospective wife". Adding to that, "she slips in and out of the two challenging and contrasting roles with élan, a remarkable feat for an artiste who was only 22 and hardly 10-films old when she signed to play this difficult but decisive role in her dazzling career" and concluded that "the movie is all about Vyjayanthimala's skills as a dancer and an actor[...]is captivating in her dancing numbers[...]The Filmfare Award for Best Actress that year could not have gone to anyone else even though she was also nominated in the same category for Madhumati."

Similarly, Rediff's reviewer Dinesh Raheja has commented that "Sadhna was quite progressive in its approach, boldly dealt with a prostitute's love story with a literature professor[...]it dared to portray not just the often seen tragic trajectory of a prostitute's life and times, but a happy ending as well". Furthermore, Raheja added that, "Though Chopra's narrative style is conventional, he needs to be commended for attempting a reformist tale". The music director Datta Naik and the lyricist Sahir Ludhianvi were praised for their involvement, especially for "Aurat Ne Janam Diya Mardon Ko", described as "crowning glory" and "hair-raising" song of the film.

=== Commercial ===
At the end of its theatrical run, the film grossed around ₹16,000,000 with a net of ₹8,000,000, thus becoming the fifth highest-grossing film of 1958 with a verdict of "hit" at Box Office India. The film was the third direct box office hit film for the B. R. Films banner after Ek Hi Raasta and Naya Daur (1957), and the sixth consecutive hit of B.R. Chopra as director after Afsana, Shole and Chandni Chowk. After Sadhna, which made Chopra financially the most-viable banner, the top heroes and heroines were prepared to work with him at half their remuneration for the box office guarantee offered by his banner.

== Awards ==
At 6th Filmfare Awards, Vyjayanthimala become the first ever actor to receive dual nominations in an acting category in the same year for her work in Madhumati and Sadhna, winning for the latter. The nominations also makes her the first-ever multi-nominee across all categories, a record she shares with Mukhram Sharma nominated for Sadhna and Talaaq, winning for the former. The win also makes her the first performer in Filmfare history to win in both leading and supporting categories.

Year	Award	Category	Nominee	Result	Ref.
1959	Filmfare Awards	Best Film	B. R. Chopra	Nominated	
1959	Filmfare Awards	Best Director	B. R. Chopra	Nominated	
1959	Filmfare Awards	Best Actress	Vyjayanthimala	Won	
1959	Filmfare Awards	Best Supporting Actress	Leela Chitnis	Nominated	
1959	Filmfare Awards	Best Story	Mukhram Sharma	Won	
1959	Filmfare Awards	Best Lyricist	Sahir Ludhianvi (For "Aurat Ne Janam Diya")	Nominated	
