= Jailor (1958 film) =

1958 film

- Directed by: Sohrab Modi
- Written by: Kamal Amrohi
- Screenplay by: J. K. Nanda
- Story by: Kamal Amrohi
- Produced by: Sohrab Modi
- Starring: Sohrab Modi; Kamini Kaushal; Geeta Bali; Abhi Bhattacharya
- Cinematography: Y. D. Sarpotdar
- Edited by: P. Bhalchandra
- Music by: Madan Mohan
- Production company: Minerva Movietone
- Distributed by: Minerva Movietone
- Release date: 1958
- Running time: 110 minutes
- Country: India
- Language: Hindi

Jailor is a 1958 Hindi psychosocial melodrama film produced and directed by Sohrab Modi.

The film was a remake of Modi's earlier Jailor (1938). The production company was Minerva Movietone, with story and dialogue written by Kamal Amrohi. The additional dialogue was by O. P. Dutta and screenplay by J. K. Nanda. Music for the film was composed by Madan Mohan with lyrics by Rajendra Krishan.

Sohrab Modi cast himself once again in the title role of the Jailor. The film co-starred Kamini Kaushal, Geeta Bali, Abhi Bhattacharya, Daisy Irani, Nana Palsikar, Eruch Tarapore and Pratima Devi.

The story involved a Jailor played by Modi, whose wife Kamal (Kamini Kaushal) elopes with Dr. Ramesh, enacted by Abhi Bhattacharya, turning him into a bitter and tyrannical misogynist.

== Plot ==
Dilip (Sohrab Modi) is a kind-hearted prison warden (Jailor), who lives with his wife Kanwal (Kamini Kaushal) and little daughter Bali (Daisy Irani). Kanwal enjoys herself by staying out late at parties and meeting people. She equates her life in the house as a jail. Dilip tells her that her life is within the four walls of the house, and orders her not to go out without his permission. Kanwal hates the scar on her husband's face and taunts Dilip about his ugly looks. Kanwal finally elopes with Dr. Ramesh, leaving her daughter behind. This turns Dilip into a hard cruel man who becomes oppressive. Kanwal and Dr. Ramesh go through hardships with Ramesh turning blind and Kanwal becoming disfigured following an accident. Dilip goes to the hospital and brings Kanwal back home. He has her locked up in her room forbidding her to meet her daughter. His constant taunts and berating compel Kanwal to commit suicide. Bali falls sick and dies.

In the meantime, Dilip has come across a blind girl Chhaya (Geeta Bali), whose brother, Dilip had saved from killing himself. Her brother (Raj Kumar) kills the evil Chowdhary (Nana Palsikar), who tries to molest Chhaya. Before going to jail, he asks Dilip to look after his blind sister. Dilip's attitude towards women starts changing as he feels drawn to Chhaya. But he finds that Chhaya is also in love with Dr. Ramesh, who has been living in a temple since his accident. Chhaya and Ramesh had met earlier in the temple, but were separated by the cunning Chowdhary. Dilip goes in search of him and decides to donate his savings to different temples. At one of the temples, Chhaya and Dilip come across Ramesh. Chhaya and Ramesh are finally united with their sight restored.

== Cast ==
- Sohrab Modi as Jailor Dilip
- Kamini Kaushal as Kamal
- Geeta Bali as Chhaya
- Abhi Bhattacharya as Dr. Ramesh
- Daisy Irani as Bali
- Nana Palsikar as Ram Singh Chaudhary

== Soundtrack ==
The music director was Madan Mohan with lyrics by Rajendra Krishan. The playback singers were Lata Mangeshkar, Asha Bhosle, Mohammed Rafi and Mahendra Kapoor.

=== Songlist ===
Song	Singer
"Bundaniya Barsan Lagi Re"	Lata Mangeshkar
"Hum Pyar Mein Jalnewalon"	Lata Mangeshkar
"Meri Hirni Jaisi Chaal, O Mere Ghungharwale Baal"	Mohammed Rafi, Asha Bhosle
"Mujh Hi Mein Chhupkar Mujh Hi Se Door"	Mohammed Rafi, Asha Bhosle
"Dekho Yeh Zamana Kare"	Asha Bhosle
"Pyar Ki Nishaniyan"	Asha Bhosle
"Bas Ek Saza Hi To Hai"	Mahendra Kapoor
