= Filmfare Award for Best Story =

Annual award for Hindi films

- Awarded for: Best Performance by a Story Writer
- Country: India
- Presented by: Filmfare
- First award: Mukhram Sharma, Aulad (1955)
- Currently held by: Aditya Dhar, Monal Thaakar Article 370 (2025)
- Website: Filmfare Awards

The Filmfare Award for Best Story is given by the Filmfare magazine as part of its annual Filmfare Awards for Hindi films, to recognise a writer who wrote a film's story.

== List of winners ==
=== 1950s ===
- 1955 Mukhram Sharma – Aulad
- 1956 Mukhram Sharma – Vachan
  - Manoranjan Ghose – Jagriti
  - Rajinder Singh Bedi – Garam Coat
- 1957 Amiya Chakrabarty – Seema
- 1958 Akhtar Mirza – Naya Daur
- 1959 Mukhram Sharma – Sadhna
  - Mukhram Sharma – Talaaq
  - Ritwik Ghatak – Madhumati

=== 1960s ===
- 1960 Subodh Ghosh – Sujata
  - Dhruva Chatterjee – Chirag Kahan Roshni Kahan
  - Mukhram Sharma – Dhool Ka Phool
- 1961 Ruby Sen – Masoom
  - Saghir Usmani – Chaudhvin Ka Chand
  - Salil Chowdhury – Parakh
- 1962 C. V. Sridhar – Nazrana
  - C. J. Pavri – Kanoon
  - Mohan Kumar – Aas Ka Panchhi
- 1963 K.P. Kottarakara – Rakhi
  - Bimal Mitra – Sahib Bibi Aur Ghulam
  - Jawar N. Sitaraman – Main Chup Rahungi
- 1964 Jarasandha – Bandini
  - B.R. Films (Story Dept.) – Gumrah
  - C. V. Sridhar – Dil Ek Mandir
- 1965 Ban Bhatt – Dosti
  - Inder Raj Anand – Sangam
  - Khwaja Ahmad Abbas – Shehar Aur Sapna
- 1966 Akhtar Mirza – Waqt
  - Gulshan Nanda – Kaajal
  - Ramanand Sagar – Arzoo
- 1967 R. K. Narayan – Guide
  - Hrishikesh Mukherjee – Anupama
  - Nihar Ranjan Gupta – Mamta
- 1968 Manoj Kumar – Upkaar
  - Ashapoorna Devi – Mehrban
  - Protiva Bose – Aasra
- 1969 Sachin Bhowmick – Brahmachari
  - Gulshan Nanda – Neel Kamal
  - Ramanand Sagar – Aankhen

=== 1970s ===
- 1970 Vasant Kanetkar – Aansoo Ban Gaye Phool
  - Hrishikesh Mukherjee – Aashirwad
  - Sachin Bhowmick – Aradhana
- 1971 Chandrakant Kakodkar – Do Raaste
  - Gulshan Nanda – Khilona
  - Sachin Bhowmick – Pehchan
- 1972 Hrishikesh Mukherjee – Anand
  - Gulshan Nanda – Kati Patang
  - Gulshan Nanda – Naya Zamana
- 1973 Basu Bhattacharya – Anubhav
  - Manoj Kumar – Shor
- 1974 Salim–Javed – Zanjeer
  - Gulzar – Koshish
  - Khwaja Ahmad Abbas – Achanak
  - Mulraj Rajda – Aaj Ki Taaza Khabar
  - Shakti Samanta – Anuraag
- 1975 Kaifi Azmi, Ismat Chughtai – Garm Hava
  - Ashutosh Mukhopadhyay – Kora Kagaz
  - Manoj Kumar – Roti Kapda Aur Makaan
  - N. T. Rama Rao – Bidaai
  - Shyam Benegal – Ankur
- 1976 Salim–Javed – Deewaar
  - Kamleshwar – Aandhi
  - Salim–Javed – Sholay
  - Shaktipada Rajguru – Amanush
  - Vijay Tendulkar – Nishant
- 1977 Balai Chand Mukhopadhyay – Arjun Pandit
  - Ashapoorna Devi – Tapasya
  - Gulshan Nanda – Mehbooba
  - Kamleshwar – Mausam
  - Pamela Chopra – Kabhi Kabhie
- 1978 Sharat Chandra Chatterji – Swami
  - Asrani – Chala Murari Hero Banne
  - Bhusan Bangali – Kinara
  - Raju Saigal – Doosra Aadmi
  - Shanker Shesh – Gharaonda
- 1979 Dinesh Thakur – Ghar
  - Chandrakant Kakodkar – Main Tulsi Tere Aangan Ki
  - Laxmikant Sharma – Muqaddar Ka Sikandar
  - Salim–Javed – Trishul
  - Samaresh Basu – Kitaab

=== 1980s ===
- 1980 Shanker Shesh – Dooriyaan
  - K. Viswanath – Sargam
  - Ruskin Bond – Junoon
  - Sailesh Dey – Gol Maal
  - Salim–Javed – Kaala Patthar
- 1981 Vijay Tendulkar – Aakrosh
  - D. N. Mukherjee – Khubsoorat
  - Esmayeel Shroff – Thodisi Bewafaii
  - Ram Kalkar – Aasha
  - Shabd Kumar – Insaaf Ka Tarazu
- 1982 Chetan Anand – Kudrat
  - Jaywant Dalvi – Chakra
  - K. Balachander – Ek Duuje Ke Liye
  - Leela Phansalkar – Baseraa
  - Shyam Benegal, Girish Karnad – Kalyug
- 1983 Samaresh Basu – Namkeen
  - Achla Nagar – Nikaah
  - Kamna Chandra – Prem Rog
  - Sagar Sarhadi – Bazaar
  - Salim–Javed – Shakti
- 1984 S. D. Panvalkar – Ardh Satya
  - Balu Mahendra – Sadma
  - Javed Akhtar – Betaab
  - Mahesh Bhatt – Arth
  - Mohan Kumar – Avtaar
- 1985 Mahesh Bhatt – Saaransh
  - Gyav Dev Agnihotri – Ghar Ek Mandir
  - Javed Akhtar – Mashaal
  - Shabd Kumar – Aaj Ki Awaaz
  - Sudhir Mishra – Mohan Joshi Hazir Ho!
- 1986 Aleem Masroor – Tawaif
  - C. T. Khanolkar – Ankahee
  - Javed Akhtar – Arjun
  - K. K. Singh – Ram Teri Ganga Maili
  - Mahesh Bhatt – Janam
  - Rajan Roy – Saaheb
- 1987 Not Awarded
- 1988 Not Awarded
- 1989 Subodh Ghosh – Ijaazat

=== 1990s ===
- 1990 K. Vishwanath – Eeshwar
  - Aditya Bhattacharya – Raakh
  - J. P. Dutta – Batwara
  - Joy Augustine – Goonj
- 1991 Rajkumar Santoshi – Ghayal
- 1992 Honey Irani – Lamhe
  - Ramapada Chowdhury – Ek Doctor Ki Maut
  - Sai Paranjpye – Disha
  - Sujit Sen, Nana Patekar – Prahaar: The Final Attack
- 1993 Not Awarded
- 1994 Sutanu Gupta – Damini – Lightning
- 1995 K. K. Singh – Krantiveer
- 1996 Ram Gopal Varma – Rangeela
- 1997 Gulzar – Maachis
- 1998 Kamal Haasan – Virasat
- 1999 Mahesh Bhatt – Zakhm

=== 2000s ===
- 2000 Vinay Shukla – Godmother
- 2001 Honey Irani – Kya Kehna
- 2002 Ashutosh Gowariker – Lagaan
- 2003 Jaideep Sahni – Company
- 2004 Nagesh Kukunoor – 3 Deewarein
- 2005 Yash Chopra– Veer-Zaara
- 2006 Sudhir Mishra, Ruchi Narain, Shiv Kumar Subramaniam – Hazaaron Khwaishein Aisi
- 2007 Rajkumar Hirani, Vidhu Vinod Chopra – Lage Raho Munna Bhai
  - Jaideep Sahni – Khosla Ka Ghosla
  - Kamlesh Pandey – Rang De Basanti
  - Karan Johar – Kabhi Alvida Naa Kehna
  - Kersi Khambatta – Being Cyrus
  - Mahesh Bhatt – Gangster
- 2008 Amol Gupte – Taare Zameen Par
  - Jaideep Sahni – Chak De! India
  - Mani Ratnam – Guru
  - Rahul Dholakia, David N. Donihue – Parzania
  - Vibha Singh – Dharm
- 2009 Abhishek Kapoor – Rock On!!
  - Aseem Arora – Heroes
  - Dibakar Banerjee, Urmi Juvekar – Oye Lucky! Lucky Oye!
  - Neeraj Pandey – A Wednesday
  - Santosh Sivan – Tahaan

=== 2010s ===
- 2010 Abhijat Joshi, Rajkumar Hirani – 3 Idiots
  - Anurag Kashyap, Aparna Malhotra, Raj Singh Chaudhary, Sanjay Maurya – Gulaal
  - Imtiaz Ali – Love Aaj Kal
  - Jaideep Sahni – Rocket Singh: Salesman of the Year
  - Zoya Akhtar – Luck By Chance
- 2011 Anurag Kashyap, Vikramaditya Motwane – Udaan
- 2012 Sanjay Chauhan – I Am Kalam
  - Akshat Verma – Delhi Belly
  - Amol Gupte – Stanley Ka Dabba
  - Rajat Arora – The Dirty Picture
  - Reema Kagti, Zoya Akhtar – Zindagi Na Milegi Dobara
- 2013 Juhi Chaturvedi – Vicky Donor
- 2014 Subhash Kapoor – Jolly LLB
- 2015 Rajat Kapoor – Ankhon Dekhi
  - Anurag Kashyap – Ugly
  - Imtiaz Ali – Highway
  - Nitin Kakkar – Filmistaan
  - Rajkumar Hirani and Abhijat Joshi – PK
- 2016 V. Vijayendra Prasad – Bajrangi Bhaijaan
  - Juhi Chaturvedi – Piku
  - Olivia Stewart – Titli
  - R. Balki – Shamitabh
  - Sharadindu Bandyopadhyay – Detective Byomkesh Bakshy!
- 2017 Shakun Batra, Ayesha Devitre Dhillon – Kapoor & Sons.
- 2018 Amit V Masurkar – Newton
  - Amit Joshi – Trapped
  - Rahul Dahiya – G Kutta Se
  - Shanker Raman and Sourabh Ratnu – Gurgaon
  - Shubhashish Bhutiani – Mukti Bhawan
  - Suresh Triveni – Tumhari Sulu
- 2019 Anubhav Sinha – Mulk
  - Anudeep Singh – Mukkabaaz
  - Raj and DK – Stree
  - Sharat Katariya – Sui Dhaaga
  - ~~Akshat Ghildial, Shantanu Srivastava and Jyoti Kapoor – Badhaai Ho~~ (Withdrawn)

=== 2020s ===
- 2020 Anubhav Sinha, Gaurav Solanki – Article 15
  - Abhishek Chaubey, Sudip Sharma – Sonchiriya
  - Jagan Shakti – Mission Mangal
  - Nitesh Tiwari, Piyush Gupta and Nikhil Mehrotra – Chhichhore
  - Vasan Bala – Mard Ko Dard Nahi Hota
  - Zoya Akhtar, Reema Kagti – Gully Boy
- 2021 Anubhav Sinha, Mrunmayee Lagoo Waikul – Thappad
  - Hardik Mehta – Kaamyaab
  - Juhi Chaturvedi – Gulabo Sitabo
  - Rajesh Krishnan, Kapil Sawant – Lootcase
  - Rohena Gera – Sir
  - Shubham – Eeb Allay Ooo!
- 2022 Abhishek Kapoor, Supratik Sen and Tushar Paranjape – Chandigarh Kare Aashiqui
  - Dibakar Banerjee and Varun Grover – Sandeep Aur Pinky Faraar
  - Kanika Dhillon – Haseen Dilruba
  - Nandha Periyasamy – Rashmi Rocket
  - Seema Pahwa – Ramprasad Ki Tehrvi
- 2023 Akshat Ghildial and Suman Adhikary – Badhaai Do
  - Anirudh Iyer – An Action Hero
  - Jaspal Singh Sandhu And Rajeev Barnwal – Vadh
  - Niren Bhatt – Bhediya
  - Sunil Gandhi – Uunchai
- 2024 Amit Rai – OMG 2
- Devashish Makhija – Joram
  - Anubhav Sinha – Bheed
  - Atlee – Jawan
  - Ishita Moitra, Shashank Khaitan, Sumit Roy – Rocky Aur Rani Kii Prem Kahaani
  - Parijat Joshi, Tarun Dudeja – Dhak Dhak
  - Karan Shrikant Sharma – Satyaprem Ki Katha
  - Siddharth Anand – Pathaan
- 2025 Aditya Dhar, Monal Thaakar – Article 370
  - Aakash Kaushik – Bhool Bhulaiyaa 3
  - Nikhil Nagesh Bhat – Kill
  - Niren Bhatt – Stree 2
  - Dibakar Banerjee, Shubham, Prateek Vats – Love Sex Aur Dhokha 2

== See also ==
- Cinema of India
