= Detective (1958 film) =

- The theatrical release poster of Detective
- Directed by: Shakti Samanta
- Written by: B.H. Bukhari(dialogues)
- Screenplay by: Nabendu Ghosh Bukhari
- Produced by: Ranjith Kumar
- Starring: Pradeep Kumar; Mala Sinha; Johnny Walker
- Cinematography: P. Isaac
- Edited by: Vishnu Kumar Singh
- Music by: Mukul Roy
- Production company: Amiya Chitra
- Release date: 1958
- Running time: 114 minutes
- Country: India
- Language: Hindi

Detective is a 1958 Bollywood film starring Pradeep Kumar and Mala Sinha. It is one of the first films directed by Shakti Samanta which failed to become a success. Production and music were by Mukul Roy while the lyrics were by Shailendra.

== Cast ==
- Pradeep Kumar as Raja Ghosh
- Mala Sinha as Mashin Loonpe
- Johnny Walker as John Butler
- Daisy Irani as Master
- K.N. Singh as Gonsalves
- Krishnakant as Sukhdev
- Moni Chatterjee as Loonpe
- Dhumal as Chaudhary
- Gautam Mukherjee as Police Commissioner
- Bhagwan Sinha
- Ratan Gaurang
- Bhattacharya
- Bimla Kumari

== Music ==
Song	Singer
"Chhodiye Gussa Huzoor"	Mohammed Rafi
"Aankhon Pe Bharosa Mat Kar"	Mohammed Rafi, Sudha Malhotra
"Aaja Karle Muqabla, Ye Baazi Pyar Ki"	Mohammed Rafi, Geeta Dutt
"Kal Talak Hum Theek Tha, Aaj Hamen Kya Ho Gaya"	Mohammed Rafi, Geeta Dutt
"Mujhko Tum Jo Mile, Yeh Jahan Mil Gaya" (Duet)	Hemant Kumar, Geeta Dutt
"Mujhko Tum Jo Mile, Yeh Jahan Mil Gaya"	Geeta Dutt
"Do Chamakti Aankhon Mein"	Geeta Dutt
"Raahi Chal Sambhal Sambhalke"	Asha Bhosle
