= Pyaar Kiya To Darna Kya (1963 film) =

- Directed by: B. S. Ranga
- Written by: Mukhram Sharma
- Produced by: Vikram studio
- Starring: Prithviraj Kapoor; Shammi Kapoor; B. Saroja Devi
- Edited by: P. G. Mohan
- Music by: Ravi; Shakeel Badayuni (lyrics)
- Production company: Vikram Productions
- Release date: 25 February 1963
- Running time: 140 minutes
- Country: India
- Language: Hindi

Pyaar Kiya To Darna Kya is a black and white 1963 Indian Hindi film, directed by B.S. Ranga. The film starred Shammi Kapoor, B. Saroja Devi, Pran, Om Prakash, Helen, Agha and Prithviraj Kapoor. The film's music was by Ravi Shankar.

== Plot ==
Rajesh is the son of a rich father, Kunwar Sahib. Rajesh falls in love with Savita a daughter of a teacher Ramdas, who Rajesh got sacked and humiliated when he was younger. Savita successfully prods Rajesh to study harder in college instead of being a layabout and he ranks first in the whole college and wins a gold medal. Kunwar Sahib is not happy with his son's love affair and refuses to accept their love. But Rajesh marries Savita without his father's permission and comes home. Rajesh's father Kunwar Sahib does not greet them or accept them and he consequently insults Savita. Not happy with that, Rajesh leaves home and they start living at Jeevan's house, who is one of his friends. Jeevan starts poisoning Rajesh's mind against Savita because Savita humiliated and slapped Jeevan when he tried to woo her in college. Big misunderstandings start creeping into their relationship. Not long after the couple separate due to these misunderstandings that have been caused between them. After a while Jeevan's friend Rita starts feeling guilty of the misunderstandings that have been caused and brings out the truth to Rajesh who feels guilty for his mistake and works to rectifying it.

== Cast ==
- Prithviraj Kapoor as Kunwar Sahib
- Shammi Kapoor as Rajesh
- B. Saroja Devi as Savita
- Pran as Jeevan
- Om Prakash as Asharam
- Helen as Rita
- Agha as Banke
- Shubha Khote as Sarla
- Rukmani Devi as Parvati
- Pushpavalli as Kamla

== Music ==
Song	Singer	Raga
"Jaan-E-Bahaar, Husn Tera"	Mohammed Rafi	Malkauns
"Jab Tak Hum Hai"	Mohammed Rafi	
"Zindagi Kya Hai"	Mohammed Rafi	
"Aa Meri Jaan"	Mohammed Rafi	
"Mohabbat Ka Naghma Zuban Par Na Aata"	Mohammed Rafi, Asha Bhosle	
"Mera Dil Aashiqana Hai, Haay, Mera Dil Aashiqana Hai"	Mohammed Rafi, Asha Bhosle	
"Dil Tumko De Diya Jaan-E-Jigar, Kahin Phenk Na Dena"	Mohammed Rafi, Asha Bhosle	
"Baharon Ki Kahani"	Asha Bhosle	
"Duniya Mein Mohabbatwalon"	Asha Bhosle	
