= Sahara (1958 film) =

1958 Indian Bollywood film by Lekhraj Bhakri

- Poster
- Directed by: Lekhraj Bhakri
- Written by: Lekhraj Bhakri; Kuldeep Sehgal
- Produced by: Kuldeep Sehgal
- Starring: Meena Kumari; M. Rajan; Kanhaiyalal; Kuldip Kaur
- Cinematography: Ranjodh Thakur
- Edited by: Lachhmandass
- Music by: Hemant Kumar; Bharat Vyas (lyrics)
- Distributed by: Tasveeristan
- Release date: 1958
- Country: India
- Language: Hindi

Sahara (transl. Support) is a 1958 Hindi-language drama film directed by Lekhraj Bhakri and produced by Kuldeep Sehgal under the K. S. Films banner. The film stars Meena Kumari, M. Rajan, Kanhaiya Lal, Kuldip Kaur, and Manoj Kumar. It tells the story of Leela (Kumari), a woman facing emotional and societal struggles in a conservative post-independence setting. The film's soundtrack was composed by Hemant Kumar, with lyrics penned by Bharat Vyas.

Sahara was released in India on 1 January 1958 to generally positive reviews from critics, with praise directed towards its emotional depth, music, and Kumari's performance, while its pacing received some criticism. The film emerged as an average grosser at the box office.

At the 6th Filmfare Awards, Sahara earned Meena Kumari a nomination for Best Actress for her performance.

== Plot ==
Leela, an orphaned young woman, lives with her aunt Rangilibai, uncle Vikram Singh, and cousin Kaushalya. When Rangilibai arranges Kaushalya's marriage to the son of a wealthy landlord, Leela is sent along as a maid as part of her dowry. However, the landlord rejects Kaushalya and marries Leela instead.

After the marriage, Leela is falsely accused of having a lover and is expelled from her husband's home. She returns to Rangilibai, who refuses to take her in. She is later taken in by a distant relative, Gaman Singh, and his wife, Swarupbai. When she refuses to beg for alms, Swarupbai blinds her using medicated eye drops.

Leela is then led to a temple daily and made to sit and beg by singing. There, she meets a young beggar boy named Panna and forms a bond with him.

== Cast ==
- Meena Kumari ... Leela
- M. Rajan ... Chhote Thakur
- Daisy Irani ... Panna
- Kuldip Kaur ... Swarupbai
- Kanhaiya Lal ... Gaman Singh
- Kammo ... Kaushaliya
- Manoj Kumar ... Shyam
- Leela Mishra ... Rangilibai
- Badri Prasad ... Vikram Singh

== Soundtrack ==
The music of the film was composed by Hemant Kumar & Bharat Vyas.

Sound tracks :

1. So Ja Dukhiyare Dukhiya Ke Pyare, By: Lata Mangeshkar
2. Nache Bandriya Lahnga Daal Ke, By : Lata Mangeshkar, Aarti Mukherjee
3. Ban Ke Suhagan Rahi Abhagan, By: Lata Mangeshkar
4. Ek Baat Kahu Tumse, By: Pratima Bannerjee
5. Andhon Pe Daya Karna Data, By: Lata Mangeshkar
6. Mujhe Tarke Talluk Ke Liye, By: Sudha Malhotra
7. Har Dukhra Sehne Wali, Muh Se Naa Kuch Kahne Wali, By: Bela Mukherjee, Hemant Kumar
8. Chham Chham Chham Chham Chale O Maa, By: Lata Mangeshkar
9. Aaghaz Ka Mohabbat Ki Baate, By: Aarti Mukherji, Hemant Kumar, Lata Mangeshkar, Sudha Malhotra

== Awards ==
At the 6th Filmfare Awards, Sahara received its only nomination, with Meena Kumari being nominated for Best Actress for her performance.
