= Sau Din Saas Ke =

- Directed by: Vijay Sadanah
- Produced by: Chander Sadanah
- Starring: Nilu Phule; Ashok Kumar; Raj Babbar; Reena Roy; Bela Bose
- Cinematography: Keki Mistry
- Music by: Kalyanji Anandji
- Release date: 27 June 1980
- Country: India
- Language: Hindi

Sau Din Saas Ke (transl. Hundred days of mother-in-law) is an Indian Bollywood film directed by Vijay Sadanah and produced by Chander Sadanah. It stars Reena Roy, Ashok Kumar, Raj Babbar, Asha Parekh, Siddharth Kak and Bela Bose in pivotal roles. Lalita Pawar played a ruthless mother-in-law, a role she was famous for. Reena Roy is the star of the show. She plays an unconventional daughter-in-law who questions society's norms of suppressing daughters-in-law. Reena Roy looks fierce and delivers an outstanding performance as Durga.

It is a remake of the Marathi film Sasurvashin (1978), produced by Annasaheb Deulgaonkar, directed by Babasaheb S. Fattelal, and starring Lalita Pawar and Nilu Phule in the supporting roles. The film was also remade in Tamil as Marumagale Vazhga (1986) starring Suhasini.

== Plot summary ==
It is a story about a mother in law (Lalita Pawar) who tortures her elder daughter-in-law (Asha Parekh) in order to prove her control over the family. Her younger son (Raj Babbar) fell in love with Durga (Reena Roy) and wants to marry her. After marriage he refuses to take his wife at his mother's place due to her mother's sarcastic nature but Reena Roy is adamant and visits her mother in law's place in order to prove her that daughter in laws are not mere slaves. After many circumstances at last Lalita Pawar realised the truth and gave her affection to both of her daughter in laws.

== Cast ==
- Ashok Kumar...Colonel Gupta
- Asha Parekh...Sheela
- Reena Roy...Durga
- Raj Babbar...Prakash
- Nilu Phule...Lalla Khubchand (Lallaji)
- Bela Bose...Soumitra (Gupta's wife)
- Siddharth Kak... Sheela's husband
- Lalita Pawar...Bhawani Devi (Prakash's mother)
- Deven Verma...Totaram
- Jayshree T.Kesarbai
- Manmohan Krishna...Sukhlal Kaka

== Music ==
1. "Saathi Mere Tum Jo Mile Sara Jahan Mere Sath Aa Gya" - Suresh Wadkar, Kanchan
2. "Sau Sau Saal Jiyo Hamari Saasu Ji" - Kanchan, Asha Bhosle
3. "Maha Chalu Hai Dilbar Mera" - Asha Bhosle
4. "Moti Palley Pai Gayi" - Mahendra Kapoor
