= Manmohan Krishna =

Indian film actor and director (1921–1990)

Manmohan Krishna Chadha
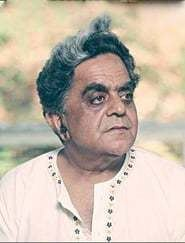
- Born: 11 August 1922; Lahore, Punjab, British India
- Died: 3 November 1990 (aged 68); Bombay, Maharashtra, India
- Other name: Manmohan Krishan
- Occupations: actor, director
- Years active: 1950–1989

Manmohan Krishna (26 February 1922 – 3 November 1990) was an Indian film actor and director, who worked in Hindi films for four decades, mostly as a character actor. A Physics professor, he later became a full-time actor. He anchored the radio show Cadbury's Phulwari, a singing contest and sang his first song, 'Jhat khol de' in Afsar (1950), a Dev Anand film with music by S.D. Burman.

He was a favourite with the Chopra brothers and played small or large roles in movies directed and/or produced by them. Deewar, Trishul, Daag, Hamraaz, Joshila, Kanoon, Sadhna, Kaala Patthar, Dhool Ka Phool, Waqt and Naya Daur are some examples.

He worked in nearly 250 films, notably Naya Daur (1957), Khandan (1965), Sadhana (1958), Waqt (1965) and Hamraaz (1967). He won acclaim for his work in Bees Saal Baad (1962) and won the Filmfare Award for Best Supporting Actor for his role as Abdul Rasheed in Dhool Ka Phool (1960), where the song epitomizing Nehruvian secularism, Tu Hindu banega na Musalman banega, insaan ki aulaad hai, insaan banega was picturised on him. Beside these, he also acted in 12 Punjabi films, played a pivotal role in K. A. Abbas's Shehar Aur Sapna (1963), which won the National Film Award for Best Feature Film, and acted in the first Indo-Soviet co-production Pardesi (1957), which was nominated for the Golden Palm at 1958 Cannes Film Festival.

Later in his career he directed the film for Yash Raj Films, Noorie (1979), for which he was also nominated for Filmfare Award for Best Director.

He died at Lokmanya Tilak Hospital, Mumbai at the age of 68 in 1990. His son Dr Ram Chaddha is a spine surgeon at Lilavati Hospital in Mumbai.

== Selected filmography ==
Year	Film	Role	Notes
1947	Andho Ki Duniya		
1949	Apna Desh		sang the song also "Apna Desh Hai Apna Desh"
1950	Afsar		Playback singer also
1951	Aaram	Chaman Lal	Playback singer also
1951	Nadaan	Deen Dayal	
1951	Sanam		
1952	Baiju Bawra	Shankar Anand	
1952	Rahi	Hari	
1953	Anarkali	Parvez	
1953	Shole : A Tale of Burning Tears	Dr. Kumar	
1955	Railway Platform		as assistant story, songs play, dialogues
1957	Naya Daur	Jumman	
1957	Pardesi	Champa's father	
1958	Sadhna	Lallu	
1959	Dhool Ka Phool	Abdul Rasheed	
1960	Angulimaal	Ahinsak's father (Raj Purohit)	
1961	Dharmputra	Amrit Rai	
1962	Bees Saal Baad	Ramlal /Radheshyam	
1962	Hariyali Aur Rasta	Shiv Nath	
1962	Jhoola	Head Constable Sundarlal	
1963	Grahasti	Doctor	
1963	Dil Ek Mandir	Philip	
1963	Shehar Aur Sapna		
1963	Sehra	Chief Tailab	
1964	Main Jatti Punjab Di	Darmu	Punjabi Movie
1965	Waqt	Meena Mittal's father	
1965	Khandan	Shankar Lal	
1966	Chaddian Di Doli	Father	Punjabi film
1967	Hamraaz	Meena Verma's father	
1967	Naunihal	Mansharam	
1967	Upkaar	Bisna	
1968	Izzat	Father Abraham	
1969	Aadmi Aur Insaan	Meena Khanna's father	
1970	Maharaja	Lawyer Ramdas	
1970	Pushpanjali	Maharaj, the cook	
1970	Pardesi	Tikora	
1972	Apna Desh	Deena Nath Chandra	
1972	Joroo Ka Ghulam	Mohanlal	
1972	Raampur Ka Lakshman	Kedar Nath Bhargav	
1973	Anokhi Ada	Gupta	
1973	Teen Chor	Shopkeeper	
1973	Daag	Deewan	
1973	Joshila	Jailor	
1975	Do Jasoos	Journalist, V N Sinha	
1975	Deewaar	DCP Narang	
1975	Mittar Pyare Nu	Baba ji	Punjabi Movie
1976	Aaj Ka Mahaatma	Khanna	
1976	Mazdoor Zindabaad	Seth Chunilal	
1976	Charas	Vijay Ramniklal	
1976	Santo Banto	Kartara	Punjabi film
1976	Mehbooba	Bande Ali Khan	
1977	Shirdi Ke Sai Baba	Ganpatrao	
1977	Guru Manio Granth		Punjabi film
1978	Tumhari Kasam	Ramprasad	
1978	Trishul	Deen Dayal	
1979	Kaala Patthar	Dhaba Owner	
1980	Sau Din Saas Ke	Sukhlal, Servant	
1980	Noorie	Saiji (Storyteller)	Director of the film
1981	Khoon Ki Takkar	Rahim	
1982	Pyaas		
1982	Gopichand Jasoos	Bank Manager Girdharilal	
1982	Sawaal	Late Deena Nath Mishra	Uncredited
1983	Ek Din Bahu Ka	School Master	
1983	Justice Chaudhury		
1983	Hamar Bhauji		Bhojpuri film
1984	Prerana	Chaudhary	
1985	Ek Chitthi Pyar Bhari	Milkman	
1985	Yudh (film)	Judge	
1987	Madadgaar	Sohanlal	
1988	Kanwarlal	Shastriji	
1988	Vijay	Judge	
1989	Ustaad	Schoolmaster (Masterji)	
