= Mukhram Sharma =

Indian film lyricist and story-writer (1909–2000)

- Mukhram Sharma
- Born: 30 May 1909; Poothi, Kila Parikshit Garh, Meerut United Provinces, British India (present day Uttar Pradesh, India)
- Died: 25 April 2000 (aged 90); Meerut, Uttar Pradesh, India
- Occupation: writer
- Years active: 1954-1980

Mukhram Sharma (30 May 1909 – 25 April 2000) was an Indian film lyricist, script, and story writer. He is best known for winning the first Filmfare Award in the Best Story category in 1955 for the film Aulad. His notable works as story writer include Vachan (1955), Sadhna (1958), Talaq (1958) and Dhool Ka Phool (1959). He also produced films like Talaq (1958), Santaan, and Diwana (1967).

At the 6th Filmfare Awards, Sharma received dual nominations for Best Story for Sadhna and Talaq, making him the first-ever multi-nominee across all categories—a record he shares with actress Vyjayanthimala. Both went on to win for Sadhna in their respective categories.

== Early life ==
Sharma was born in Poothi village of Uttar Pradesh, India on 13 May 1909. He studied Sanskrit and was brought up in Meerut. He worked as a Hindi and Sanskrit language teacher while continuing writing poetry and short stories for local magazines.

== Works ==
Sharma narrated one of his stories to one of his friends in Meerut who was associated with Hindi film industry. On his friend's request, who was impressed with Sharma's stories, Sharma to visited Mumbai (then Bombay) in 1939. But, he did not get any work in Mumbai so Sharma moved to Pune, Maharashtra with his family. He joined Prabhat Films owned by filmmaker V. Shantaram as a Marathi language tutor to newcomers at the salary of ₹ 40 per month. In 1942, Sharma got his break by penning lyrics and dialogue of the Hindi-Marathi bilingual film Das Baje. The film was directed by Raja Nene, starring Urmila and Paresh Banerji. He worked with Nene on more films like Taramati, based on mythological love story of King Harishchandra and Taramati where actress Shobhna Samarth played the title role. He worked on more mythological films like Vishnu Bhagwan and Nal Damyanti. Sharma's next film was Marathi film Stree Janma Hee Tujhi Kahani (1952) which was with director Datta Dharmadhikari. The film was based on Sharma's earlier short story Aaj Ka Sawaal, later recreated in Hindi as Aurat Teri Yehi Kahaani (1954) by Chaturbhuj Doshi.

Meeting initial success, Sharma moved to Mumbai where his first film released in 1954 was Aulad. He won the first Filmfare Award in the Best Story (1955) category. He continued writing for films like Vachan (1955), Ek Hi Rasta (1956), Dushman, Sadhna (1958), Santaan, Do Behneh, Talaq (1958), Dhool Ka Phool (1959), Samadhi, Pyaar Kiya Toh Darna Kya (1963), and Humjoli (1970). Sharma's films often dealt with prevailing social issues. For Sadhna (1958) which described the life of a prostitute, Sharma had initially approached director Bimal Roy who requested to change the ending. Sharma refused for any alternation to the story and approached B. R. Chopra who made the film starring Vyjayanthimala and Sunil Dutt. Sharma also worked with filmmaker L. V. Prasad for his Hindi film, Daadi Maa (1966), Raja Aur Runk (1968), Jeene Ki Raah (1969), and Main Sunder Hoon (1971), with AVM Productions for Do Kaliyaan (1968) and with Gemini Studios for Gharana (1961), Grahasti (1963).

Sharma took retirement from film writing after the release of Nauker (1979) and Sau Din Saas Ke (1980) and moved to Meerut.

== Death ==
Sharma died on 25 April 2000 at the age of 92 at his residence in Meerut.

== Filmography ==
- Aulad (1954)
- Vachan (1955)
- Ek Hi Rasta (1956)
- Sadhna (1958)
- Talaq (1959)
- Dhool Ka Phool (1960)
- Gharana (1961)
- Grahasti (1963)
- Pyaar Kiya To Darna Kya (1963)
- Daadi Maa (1966)
- Raja Aur Runk (1968)
- Do Kaliyaan (1968)
- Jeene Ki Raah (1969)
- Humjoli (1970)
- Nauker (1979)
- Sau Din Saas Ke (1980)

== Awards ==
- 1955 - Filmfare Award for Best Story - Aulad
- 1956 - Filmfare Award for Best Story - Vachan
- 1959 - Filmfare Award for Best Film - Talaq (along with Mahesh Kaul) (Nominated)
- 1959 - Filmfare Award for Best Story - Sadhna
- 1959 - Filmfare Award for Best Story - Talaq (Nominated)
- 1960 - Filmfare Award for Best Story - Dhool Ka Phool (Nominated)
- 1961 - Sangeet Natak Akademi Award — Films (Screenplay)
- 2000 - Zee Cine Award for Lifetime Achievement
