= Dhool Ka Phool =

1959 Indian film directed by Yash Chopra

- Original poster
- Directed by: Yash Chopra
- Written by: Mukhram Sharma
- Produced by: B. R. Chopra
- Starring: Mala Sinha; Rajendra Kumar; Nanda; Manmohan Krishna; Ashok Kumar
- Cinematography: Dharam Chopra
- Edited by: Pran Mehra
- Music by: N. Dutta; Sahir Ludhianvi (lyrics)
- Distributed by: B. R. Films
- Release date: 4 December 1959
- Running time: 153 minutes
- Country: India
- Language: Hindi

Dhool Ka Phool (transl. Flower of Dust) is a 1959 Indian Hindi-language film produced by B. R. Chopra and directed by B. R.'s brother Yash Chopra, being his first movie as a director, having been an assistant director in B. R.'s earlier film Naya Daur. The film stars Mala Sinha as a woman who gives up her newborn child, born out of wedlock, after being betrayed and abandoned by the man she loves, played by Rajendra Kumar. Nanda and Manmohan Krishna appear in supporting roles, with Ashok Kumar making an extended appearance. At the 7th Filmfare Awards, Sinha received a nomination for Best Actress and Mukhram Sharma for Best Story. For his role as Abdul Rasheed, a Muslim man who adopts and raises the illegitimate child, Krishna won the Filmfare Award for Best Supporting Actor.

== Plot ==
Meena and Mahesh Kapoor are madly in love with each other. One day, both of them get intimate and Meena becomes pregnant. Mahesh marries Malti Rai (Nanda), who belongs to a good family. Meena gives birth to a little boy and takes the baby to his father. Mahesh disowns both of them, saying that it was his mistake.

Meena leaves the five-month-old infant boy in a dark forest, where a snake guards his life. On the way back from the city, Abdul Rasheed sees the child and protects him. Abdul also gets disowned by society because the baby is illegitimate and nobody knows about the parents and religion. In spite of all the odds, Abdul fights with the entire society and raises the child wholeheartedly. He names him Roshan (Master Sushil Kumar).

Meena starts working as an assistant to a lawyer, Jagdish Chandra. Jagdish starts developing a soft spot for her. They both get married without Meena revealing her past. Mahesh is now a judge and is blessed with a baby boy Ramesh (Daisy Irani). One fine day, Roshan and Mahesh's legitimate son Ramesh meet each other in school with their respective parents. In the presence of Mahesh, Abdul tells the principal of the school that he found Roshan in a forest eight years ago.

In school, Roshan and Ramesh become the best of friends. When other kids make fun of Roshan, Ramesh supports him. One day, he takes Roshan to his home, where his mother Malti welcomes him with love and affection, but Mahesh throws the boy out of his house, saying that he is not worth our respect and love, as he is illegitimate.

After all this, Roshan gets depressed and falls into bad company. Ramesh tries to stop him and dies in a car accident. This leaves Roshan more depressed. He gets involved in a theft, but he is innocent. The case comes into the court of judge Mahesh Kapoor. Abdul goes to Jagdish to fight this case, as he is a lawyer. He tells Jagdish, in front of his wife Meena, as to who actually is the mother of Roshan, and that when and under what circumstances he found Roshan. She immediately recognizes Roshan as her son. She testifies in his favour, in the court. Mahesh, recognizing Meena and their son, admits his fault.

The next day, Malti tells Mahesh to go to Abdul's house and bring Roshan, since he is his son. On the other hand, Meena is ready to leave the house sneakingly, but Jagdish stops her, saying that he respects her even more now. She can bring the child home. Both Meena and Mahesh go to Abdul's house to ask for Roshan. He first says no, but after that, he gives Roshan to Meena and Jagdish.

== Cast ==
- Mala Sinha as Meena Khosla / Meena Chandra
- Rajendra Kumar as Mahesh Kapoor
- Nanda as Malti Rai / Malti Kapoor
- Ashok Kumar as Jagdish Chandra
- Sushil Kumar as Roshan Kapoor
- Manmohan Krishna as Abdul Rashid
- Leela Chitnis as Gangu Dai
- Mohan Choti as Jaggu
- Jagdish Raj as Prosecuting Attorney
- Daisy Irani as Ramesh Kapoor
- Narbada Shankar as Pandit
- R.P. Kapoor
- Ravikant as Mahesh"s father
- Uma Datt

== Themes ==
In the next film, Dharmputra (1961), about Hindu fundamentalism, Chopra reversed the theme, as therein a Hindu family brings up an illegitimate Muslim child.

== Soundtrack ==
All lyrics provided by Sahir Ludhianvi and music by N. Datta.

| # | Song | Singer | Raga |
|---|---|---|---|
| 1 | "Daaman Mein Daag Laga Baithe" | Mohammed Rafi | |
| 2 | "Tu Hindu Banega Na Musalman Banega" | Mohammed Rafi | Bhairavi (Hindustani) |
| 3 | "Tu Mere Pyar Ka Phool Hai" | Lata Mangeshkar | |
| 4 | "Tere Pyar Ka Aasra Chahta Hoon" | Lata Mangeshkar, Mahendra Kapoor | |
| 5 | "Dhadakne Lagi Dil Ke Taaron Ki Duniya" | Asha Bhosle, Mahendra Kapoor | |
| 6 | "Jhukti Ghata, Gaati Hawa, Sapne Sajaye" | Asha Bhosle, Mahendra Kapoor | |
| 7 | "Apni Khatir Jeena Hai" | Sudha Malhotra, Mahendra Kapoor | |
| 8 | "Kaise Kahoon Man Ki Baat" | Sudha Malhotra | Kafi (raga) |

== Reception and legacy ==
Part of the narrative includes the story of Abdul Rasheed, a Muslim man bringing up an "illegitimate" Hindu child. In one instance, their story features the classic song Too Hindu Banega Na Musalman Banega, Insaan Ki Aulaad Hai, Insaan Banega, which comes to symbolise the film's narrative and arguably its core message.

The film was remade in Telugu as Jeevana Teeralu (1977).

== Awards and nominations ==
At the 7th Filmfare Awards, the film won one award and was nominated for other two:

| Year | Nominee / work | Award | Result |
|---|---|---|---|
| 1960 | Manmohan Krishna | Filmfare Award for Best Supporting Actor | Won |
| 1960 | Mala Sinha | Filmfare Award for Best Actress | Nominated |
| 1960 | Mukhram Sharma | Filmfare Award for Best Story | Nominated |
