= Daisy Irani (actress) =

Indian actress (born 1950)

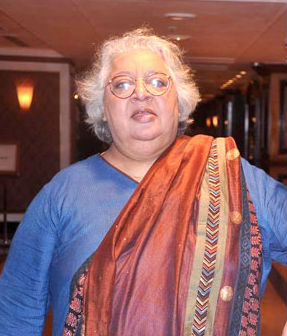
- Irani at the 2012 audio release of Shirin Farhad Ki Toh Nikal Padi
- Born: 17 June 1950 (age 76); Bombay, Bombay State, India
- Occupation: Actress
- Spouse: K. K. Shukla (m. 1971; died 1993)
- Children: 3
- Relatives: Honey Irani (sister); Zoya Akhtar (niece); Javed Akhtar (former brother-in-law); Farhan Akhtar (nephew); Farah Khan (niece); Sajid Khan (nephew)

Daisy Irani Shukla (born 17 June 1950) is an Indian actress in Hindi language films. She was a popular child actor in the 1950s and 1960s. She is most known for films such as Bandish (1955), Ek Hi Raasta (1956), Naya Daur (1957), Hum Panchhi Ek Daal Ke (1957), Jailor (1958), Qaidi No. 911 (1959) and Do Ustad (1959). As a supporting actress, she acted in Kati Patang in 1971. She also worked in a TV show Shararat (2003–2006).

== Background and personal life ==
Irani was born into an Irani Zoroastrian family and her mother-tongue is Gujarati. She is the eldest of three sisters, the other two being Honey Irani and Menaka Irani. Her younger sister Honey, who was also a child-star, was married to script-writer Javed Akhtar and their children are Bollywood film-makers Farhan Akhtar and Zoya Akhtar. Irani's other sister, Menaka, was married to the stunt film-maker Kamran Khan, and was the mother of film-makers Sajid Khan and Farah Khan.

Daisy married screenwriter K. K. Shukla, on 21 January 1971 at age 21. He died in 1993. She acted as a child-star in industry. She has three children, a son named Kabir and two daughters, Varsha and Ritu. None of her children are involved with the entertainment industry in any capacity.

Although born a Zoroastrian, Daisy grew interested in Christianity later in life. In 1975, she became a member of New Life Fellowship in Mumbai.

In 2018, Daisy revealed that she had been raped at the age of 6 by her "guardian" during the making of Hum Panchhi Ek Daal Ke (1957).

== Career ==
During the Golden Age (1950s–70s) of Hindi cinema, some child stars had great visibility. The Irani sisters, Daisy and Honey, who generally played boys with curly hair, became household names. The films that had both of them fetched the biggest openings. Stories were re-written to include them in the cast or increase their footage, and they were prominently publicized in the promos of their movies. Their most-remembered movies, together or separate, include Bandish, Jagte Raho, Bhai Bhai, Naya Daur, Hum Panchi Ek Daal Ke, Musafir, Sahara, Duniya Na Mane, Do Ustad, Dhool Ka Phool, Soorat Aur Seerat and Chandi Ki Diwar. Daisy, who was more popular than her younger sister as a child artiste, continued to act after growing up, though not in any significant roles.

She quit films after her marriage in 1971, with her last release being Kati Patang in 1971. In the 1980s, she worked in theatre for a while and started an acting school. After the death of her husband in the early 1990s, she returned to acting in the comedy TV series Dekh Bhai Dekh and films such as Aastha (1997), Kya Kehna and Shararat (2002).

She appeared in her nephew Sajid Khan's 2010 Housefull and thereafter in her niece Farah Khan's acting debut film Shirin Farhad Ki Toh Nikal Padi (2012), directed by Bela Sehgal.

== Filmography ==
- Bandish (1955)
- Jagte Raho (1956)
- Ek Hi Raasta (1956) Raja
- Devta (1956)
- Bhai-Bhai (1956) Munna
- Suvarna Sundari (1957)
- Naya Daur (1957)
- Musafir (1957)
- Hum Panchhi Ek Daal Ke (1957) as Chatpat
- Bhabhi (1957) as Mithu
- Yaar Paiyyan (1957, Tamil) as Poori
- Talaaq (1958)
- Sahara (1958)
- Panchayat (1958)
- Jailor (1958)
- Detective (1958)
- Raj Tilak (1958)
- Qaidi No. 911 (1959) as Guddu
- Kangan (1959)
- Duniya Na Mane (1959)
- Do Ustad (1959) as Raja
- Dhool Ka Phool (1959) as Ramesh
- Chirag Kahan Roshni Kahan (1959)
- Bhai Bahen (1959)
- Kaithi Kannayiram (1960), credited as Baby Savithri
- Kumkuma Rekha (1960) (Telugu)
- Sharabi (1964)
- Arzoo (1965)
- Kade Dhupp Kade Chhaan (1967, Punjabi movie)
- Nawab Sirazuddaula (1967)
- Ankhen (1968) as Lily
- Liludi Dharati (film) (1968, Gujarati Movie)
- Talash (1969)
- Pehchan (1970) as Rani
- Kati Patang (1970) as Ramaiah
- Geet (1970) as Laxminarayan's daughter
- Jwala (1971)
- Gomti Ke Kinare (1972) as Chandni
- Ahankaar (1995) a Naina's Mom
- Aastha: In the Prison of Spring (1997) as Reena
- Mujhe Meri Biwi Se Bachaao (2001)
- Sanjivani (2002) as Nurse Philo
- Shararat (2002) as Rani Devi
- San Ge Hao Ren (2005)
- Anjaane (2005)
- Housefull (2010) as Batook's mother
- Dil Toh Baccha Hai Ji (2011) as June's grandmother
- Shirin Farhad Ki Toh Nikal Padi (2012) as Nargis Pastakia
- Happy New Year (2014) as Namita Irani (Extended cameo appearance)
