= Talaq (1958 film) =

- Poster
- Directed by: Mahesh Kaul
- Written by: Mukhram Sharma
- Produced by: Mahesh Kaul; Mukhram Sharma
- Starring: Rajendra Kumar
- Cinematography: Vasant Nagesh Buva
- Edited by: R. V. Shrikhande
- Music by: C. Ramchandra
- Distributed by: Anupam Chitra
- Release date: 1958
- Country: India
- Language: Hindi

Talaq is a 1958 Indian Bollywood drama film starring Rajendra Kumar and produced by Anupam Chitra studios. Director Mahesh Kaul was nominated for a Filmfare Award for Best Director and the film was also nominated for a Filmfare Award for Best Movie. The music is by C. Ramchandra. Playback singers for the film include Asha Bhosle and Manna Dey with songs such as "Mere Jeevan Me" and "Zuk Gayi Dekho Garda" . The film also marked Sadhana Shivdasani making one of her earliest on-screen uncredited appearances as the Shepherd girl in the song "Mere Jeevan Mein Kiran Banake", much before she became the renowned star actress. Art direction for the film was conducted by Biren Nag and it was shot in Ranjit Studios in Bombay.

== Plot ==
The film begins with school teacher Indu in her school. She lives with her eccentric check-suited unemployed father, Moolchand Chabbe. She falls in love with Ravi Shankar Chaube, a poet and an engineer, after hearing him singing patriotic songs during an Independence Day celebration. He moves in to live in the room beneath their apartment. They marry, and Indu quits her job to raise a son named Ashoo. The marriage becomes difficult when Moolchand borrows money from Ravi and loses it gambling. Indu is forced to return to her old job and faces the prospect of a divorce.

== Cast ==
- Rajendra Kumar as Ravi Shankar Chaubey
- Kamini Kadam as Indu Chaubey
- Radhakrishan as Moolchand Chabbe
- Malika as Child Artist
- Laxmi Chhaya as Child Artist
- Aruna Irani as Child Artist
- Sajjan as Mangal
- Kusum Thakur as Tara
- Yashodhra Katju as Kamini
- Daisy Irani as Ashu
- Lal Bahadur as Revtichand Verma
- Moolchand as Gambler
- Biren Nag
- Sadhana Shivdasani (uncredited) as the unnamed Shepherd dancer-singer lip-syncing to Asha Bhosle's vocals of the song "Mere Jeevan Mein Kiran Banale"

== Music ==
1. "Bolo Tum Kaun Ho" - Asha Bhosle, Manna Dey
2. "Sambhalke Rehna" - Manna Dey
3. "Jhuk Gayi Dekho Gardan" - Asha Bhosle
4. "Nayi Umar Ki Kaliyon" - Asha Bhosle
5. "O Babushab" - Manna Dey, Asha Bhosle
6. "Dukhiyon Pe Kuch Raham Karo" - Aarti Mukherjee, Asha Bhosle
