= Aulad (1954 film) =

- Directed by: Mohan Sehgal
- Written by: Mukhram Sharma
- Screenplay by: Mukhram Sharma
- Story by: Mukhram Sharma
- Produced by: Kuldeep Sehgal
- Starring: Balraj Sahni; Nirupa Roy; Usha Kiran
- Cinematography: Ranjodh Thakur
- Edited by: Lachmanadas
- Music by: Sardar Malik
- Production company: Kuldip Pictures Ltd.
- Distributed by: Kuldip Pictures Ltd.
- Release date: 1954
- Country: India
- Language: Hindi

Aulad is a 1954 Bollywood film directed by Mohan Segal. It stars Balraj Sahni, Nirupa Roy, Usha Kiran in lead roles.

== Music ==
All music composed by Sardar Malik.

Song	Singer
"Aaj Gharwale Ghar Nahin Bhaiya, Ta Ta Thaiya"	Shamshad Begum, Mubarak Begum
"O Ji Lalla, Jeeyo Jeeyo Re Lalla"	Shamshad Begum, S. Balbir
"Duniya Tasveer Hai"	Talat Mahmood
"Mera Dil Gungunaye"	Asha Bhosle
"Tum Salamat Raho"	Asha Bhosle
"Chanda Se Pyare"	Asha Bhosle
