= Pandhari Juker =

Indian make-up artist (died 2020)

- Died: 17 February 2020
- Occupation: Make-up artist

Pandhari Juker (died 17 February 2020), popularly known as Pandhari Dada was an Indian make-up artist, who worked in Hindi film industry.

== Filmography ==
- 2009, Rita
- 2007, Kadachit
- 2002, Hum Pyar Tumhi Se Kar Baithe
- 1997, Gupt: The Hidden Truth
- 1995, Dilwale Dulhania Le Jayenge
- 1994, Tehkikaat
- 1994, Jealousy Turns Blood
- 1994, Mohra
- 1994, Yeh Dillagi
- 1993, Raunaq
- 1993, Darr
- 1993, Aaina
- 1993, Parampara
- 1991, Lamhe
- 1991, Gunehgar Kaun
- 1990, Lekin
- 1990, Izzatdaar
- 1989, Jaaydaad
- 1989, Parinda
- 1989, Chandni
- 1989, Prem Pratigyaa
- 1989, Clerk
- 1988, Khatron Ke Khiladi
- 1987, Thikana
- 1987, Hifazat
- 1986, Shatru
- 1986, Kala Dhanda Goray Log
- 1986, Dharm Adhikari
- 1985, Faasle
- 1985, Saagar
- 1985, Yudh
- 1984, Karishmaa
- 1984, Duniya
- 1984, Lorie
- 1982, Shakti
- 1982, Bazaar
- 1982, Sanam Teri Kasam
- 1981, Ek Hi Bhool
- 1981, Silsila
- 1981, Kranti
- 1978, Kaala Aadmi
- 1978, Trishul
- 1977, Doosara Aadmi
- 1977, Mukti
- 1976, Bhanwar
- 1976, Kabhie Kabhie
- 1976, Nagin
- 1975, Himalay Se Ooncha
- 1975, Kaala Sona
- 1975, Zakhmee
- 1975, Zameer
- 1975, Deewaar
- 1974, 36 Ghante
- 1974, Pran Jaye Per Vachan Na Jaye
- 1973, Joshila
- 1973, Daag: A Poem of Love
- 1973, Dhund
- 1972, Dastaan
- 1971, Reshma Aur Shera
- 1970, Man Ki Aankhen
- 1970, Purab Aur Pachhim
- 1969, Ittefaq
- 1968, Neel Kamal
- 1967, Bahu Begum
- 1967, Chandan Ka Palna
- 1965, Kaajal
- 1965, Waqt
- 1964, Chitralekha
- 1963, Taj Mahal
- 1962, Gyara Hazar Ladkian
- 1961, Dharmputra

== Recognition ==
The Government of Maharashtra awarded him with the V. Shantaram Lifetime Achievement Award for his work in 2013. He won the National Film Awards at the 59th National Film Awards.

== See also ==
- 59th National Film Awards
