= Pamela Chopra =

Indian playback singer (1948–2023)

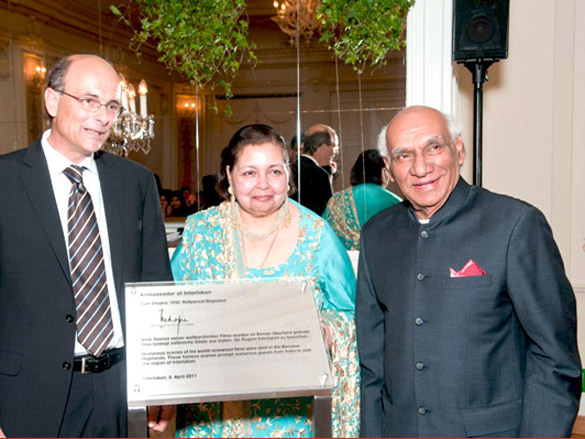
- Pamela Chopra with husband Yash Chopra (right) in 2011
- Born: Pamela Singh; 29 July 1948; Amritsar, East Punjab, Dominion of India (present-day Punjab, India)
- Died: 20 April 2023 (aged 74); Mumbai, Maharashtra, India
- Other name: Pam Chopra
- Occupations: Playback singer, film producer, writer
- Spouse: Yash Chopra (m. 1970; died 2012)
- Children: Aditya Chopra; Uday Chopra
- Relatives: Simi Garewal (first cousin)

Pamela Chopra (née Singh; 29 July 1948 – 20 April 2023) was an Indian playback singer. She was the wife of veteran Bollywood film director Yash Chopra, and was also a film writer and producer in her own right.

== Early life ==
Pamela Singh was born in Amritsar, Punjab (India) on 29 July 1948, the daughter of Mohinder Singh, an officer in the Indian Army. The eldest of three children, she had two younger brothers. Since her father was posted in several remote locations all over India, Chopra was educated at several army schools. She was a cousin of the actress Simi Garewal. Chopra's father Mohinder Singh and Garewal's mother Darshi Garewal were siblings.

== Career ==
Chopra dabbled in several fields connected to film. Starting with Kabhi Kabhie (1976) she always sang a folk inspired or wedding song in her husband's productions till Mujhse Dosti Karoge! (2002). Her name also appeared in the capacity of 'producer' on the credits of certain films made by her husband. Pamela co-wrote the script of her husband's 1997 film Dil To Pagal Hai along with her husband Yash Chopra, her son Aditya Chopra, and professional writer Tanuja Chandra. She had strong knowledge of music and influenced the music of their home production. Besides music, she also gave anecdotes to her husband about story progression in movies. She had appeared on screen on one single occasion: in the opening song "Ek Duje Ke Vaaste" of the film Dil To Pagal Hai, where she and her husband appeared together. As a schoolgirl, Pamela had learnt Bharatanatyam, but she had never performed in public.

== Personal life ==
Pamela Chopra married the film-maker Yash Chopra in 1970. The marriage was arranged by their families in the traditional Indian manner. The two families had a common friend, the mother of film-maker Romesh Sharma (producer of the film Hum). Sharma contacted the wife of BR Chopra and suggested that Pamela Singh would be 'the ideal bride' for BR's younger brother Yash Chopra. "She was not wrong because we had a wonderful marriage", Pamela was to say forty years later in an interview. The couple met each other for the first time in a formal setting and found each other agreeable. The wedding was held in 1970.

They had two sons, Aditya (born 1971) and Uday (born 1973). Aditya is a film producer and director. He is married to actress Rani Mukerji. Uday is an actor and film producer.

== Death ==
On 20 April 2023, Pamela Chopra died from pneumonia at Lilavati Hospital in Mumbai, at the age of 74, having been admitted to the hospital due to 'age-related issues'. Her condition had quickly deteriorated, being placed on a ventilator at the time of her death.

== Selected filmography ==
=== Playback singer ===
Year	Film	Song	Co-singers	Music director
1976	Kabhi Kabhie	"Surkh Jode Ki Yeh Jagmagahat (Saada Chidiya Da Chamba Ve)"	Lata Mangeshkar, Jagjit Kaur	Khayyam
1977	Doosra Aadmi	• "Angna Ayenge Sanvariya" • "Jaan Meri Rooth Gayi"	• Deven Verma • Kishore Kumar	Rajesh Roshan
1978	Trishul	"Ja Ri Bahena Ja"	K. J. Yesudas, Kishore Kumar	Khayyam
1979	Noorie	• "Ashiq Ho To Aisa Ho (Qawwali)" • "Uske Khel Nirale"	• Mahendra Kapoor, Jagjit Kaur, S.K. Mahan • Jagjit Kaur, Anwar	Khayyam
1979	Kaala Patthar	"Jaggaya Jaggaya"	Mahendra Kapoor, S.K. Mahan	Rajesh Roshan
1981	Nakhuda	"Aaja Aaja Yaar Habibi"		Khayyam
1981	Silsila	"Khud Se Jo Vada Kiya Tha"		Shiv-Hari
1982	Bazaar	"Chale Aao Saiyaan"		Khayyam
1982	Sawaal	"Idhar Aa Sitamgar"	Jagjit Kaur	Khayyam
1984	Lorie	"Gudiya Chidiya Chand Chakori"	Jagjit Kaur, Asha Bhosle	Khayyam
1985	Faasle	"Mora Banna Dulhan Leke Aaya"	Shobha Gurtu	Shiv-Hari
1989	Chandni	"Main Sasural Nahi Jaaungi"		Shiv-Hari
1991	Lamhe	"Freak Out (Parody Song)"	Sudesh Bhonsle	Shiv-Hari
1992	Deewana Hoon Pagal Nahi	"Maiya Ki Aankhon Ka"	Suresh Wadkar, Udit Narayan	
1993	Darr	• "Meri Maa Ne Laga Diye" • "Solah Button Meri Choli"	Lata Mangeshkar, Kavita Krishnamurthy	Shiv-Hari
1993	Aaina	• "Meri Banno Ki Aayegi Baraat (Happy)" • "Meri Banno Ki Aayegi Baraat (Sad)"		Dilip Sen-Sameer Sen
1995	Dilwale Dulhania Le Jayenge	"Ghar Aaja Pardesi"	Manpreet Kaur	Jatin–Lalit
2002	Mujhse Dosti Karoge!	"The Medley"	Lata Mangeshkar, Udit Narayan, Sonu Nigam	Rahul Sharma

=== Other roles ===
Year	Film	Credited as	Notes
1976	Kabhi Kabhie	Screenwriter	
1981	Silsila	Costume designer	
1982	Sawaal	Costume designer	
1993	Aaina	Producer	
1995	Dilwale Dulhania Le Jayenge	Associate producer	
1997	Dil To Pagal Hai	Associate producer Screenwriter	
2000	Mohabbatein	Associate producer	
2002	Mujhse Dosti Karoge!	Associate producer	
2002	Mere Yaar Ki Shaadi Hai	Associate producer	
2004	Veer-Zaara	Associate producer	
