= Datta Naik =

Indian film music director (1927–1987)

Dattaram Baburao Naik

Background information
- Also known as: N Datta
- Born: 12 December 1927; Goa, Portuguese India
- Died: 30 December 1987 (aged 60) Mumbai, India
- Genre: Film score
- Occupation: Music director
- Instrument: Harmonium
- Years active: 1955–1987

Datta Naik (12 December 1927 – 30 December 1987), also credited as N. Datta, was an Indian film music director in Hindi films.

== Early life and career ==
Born in the then Portuguese colony of Goa, Naik, started his career as an assistant to the legendary music director S. D. Burman in films like Bahar, Sazaa, Ek Nazar (1951), Jaal (1952), Jeewan Jyoti (1953) and Angarey (1954). His partnership with songwriter Sahir Ludhianvi was popular and successful. He died on 30 December 1987.

Datta Naik was born in 1927 in Aroba (near Colvale), a small village in Goa. At the age of 12, he ran away from his family and came to Mumbai. There he learnt classical music and later worked as an assistant to Ghulam Haider. He was a close friend of Chandrakant Bhosle who was playing rhythm with Shankar Jaikishan's orchestra. He also used to participate in street music programs, where Sachin Dev Burman spotted his talent. The maestro employed him as his assistant and while working there, N. Datta also developed a notable career as an independent composer. His compositions showed a fine sense of melody and orchestration. His close association with lyricist Sahir Ludhianvi who was also his close friend ensured that his songs were always blessed by meaningful poetic lyrics. N. Datta also worked very closely with noted lyricists Majrooh Sultanpuri, Jan Nisar Akhtar and others.

Film Dhool Ka Phool's (composed by N. Datta) two popular songs — "Daman Mein Daag Laga Baithe" and "Tu Hindu Banega Na Musalman Banega" were penned by Sahir Ludhianvi. Noted Marathi writer and music aficionado P .L. Deshpande had once famously written that whenever he listened to Lata's emotional Dhool Ka Phool title song "Too Mere Pyaar Kaa Phool Hai", he got the impression that each word, each note was rendered as if a tender flower petal was gently placed in flowing water. In Naach Ghar, Lata's silken rendition of N. Datta's waltz based club song "Aye Dil Zubaan Naa Khol" subtly exposed this materialist world's duplicity in Sahir's sarcastic socialist lingo.

His compositions from the B. R. Chopra film, Dhool ka Phool, Sadhna and Dharamputra are considered as some of his best works. Songs from later movies like "Ponch Kar Ashk Apni Aankon Se", "Maine Pee Sharaab", "Tune Kya Piya", "Jaan Gayi Mein Toh Jaan Gayi" from Naya Raasta (1970) and "Tere Is Pyar Ka Shukriya" from Aag Aur Daag are popular as well. N. Datta also composed music for a number of Marathi films. The song "Nimbonichya jhaadaamaage chandra jhopala ga baai" sung by Suman Kalyanpur from Bala Gau Kashi Angai (1977) is still very popular.

== Death ==
N. Datta's later years were spent fighting ill health and commercial failure. The 1980 film Chehre Pe Chehra was his last Hindi film and he died on 30 December 1987.

== Filmography ==
- Baalo (Punjabi Film) ("Kothe Kothe Aa Kudiye" sang by Geeta Dutt, lyrics by Sahir Ludhiyanvi) (1951)
- Milap (1955)
- Marine Drive (1955)
- Chandrakanta (1956)
- Dashehra (1956)
- Hum Panchhi Ek Dal Ke (1957)
- Mohini (1957)
- Mr. X (1957)
- Light House (1958)
- Miss 1958 (1958)
- Sadhna (1958)
- Bhai Bahan (1959)
- Black Cat (1959)
- Dhool Ka Phool (1959)
- Jaal Saz (1959)
- Mr. John (1959)
- Naach Ghar (1959)
- Didi (1959)
- Dr. Shaitaan (1959)
- Rickshawala (1960)
- Dharmputra (1961)
- Do Bhai (1961)
- Dilli Ka Dada (1962)
- Gyara Hazar Ladkian (1962)
- Kala Samundar (1962)
- Sachche Moti (1962)
- Aawara Abdullah (1963)
- Akela (1963)
- Holiday in Bombay (1963)
- Mere Armaan Mere Sapne (1963)
- Rustam-e-Baghdad (1963)
- Baadshah (1964)
- Chandi Ki Deewar (1964)
- Herculis (1964)
- Gopal Krishna (1965)
- Khaakan (1965)
- Bahadur Daaku (1966)
- Dilaawar (1966)
- Jawan Mard (1966)
- Albela Mastana (1967)
- Raju (1967)
- Apna Ghar Apni Kahani (1968)
- Ek Masoom (1969)
- Patthar Ka Khwab (1969)
- Ustaad 420 (1970)
- Inspector (1970)
- Naya Raasta (1970)
- Aag Aur Daag (1970)
- Badnaam Farishtey (1972)
- Return of Johnny (1974)
- Do Juaari (1974)
- Ganga (1974)
- Aag Aur Toofan (1975)
- Phanda (1975)
- Miss Toofan Mail (1980)
- Chehre Pe Chehra (1981)
