= Sawaal (film) =

1982 film by Ramesh Talwar

- Directed by: Ramesh Talwar
- Screenplay by: Sagar Sarhadi
- Story by: Surinder Prakash
- Produced by: Yash Chopra
- Starring: Sanjeev Kumar; Waheeda Rehman; Shashi Kapoor; Poonam Dhillon; Randhir Kapoor; Swaroop Sampat; Prem Chopra
- Cinematography: Kay Gee
- Edited by: B. Mangeshkar
- Music by: Khayyam; Majrooh Sultanpuri (lyrics)
- Production company: Yash Raj Films
- Distributed by: Yash Raj Films
- Release date: 21 May 1982
- Running time: 123 minutes
- Country: India
- Language: Hindi

Sawaal (Hindi: सवाल; translation: Question) is a Hindi-language action crime film produced by Yash Chopra and directed by Ramesh Talwar, released in 1982. The music was composed by Khayyam and the lyrics were written by Majrooh Sultanpuri. Despite an all-star cast, it did not succeed at the box office.

== Plot ==
Seth Dhanpat Rai Mehta (Sanjeev Kumar) is the country's most powerful smuggler who is surrounded by his fortress of power and money. His daughter Sonia (Poonam Dhillon) falls in love with Ravi Malhotra (Shashi Kapoor), a police officer and wants to marry her. Dhanpat Rai very soon realizes that his son Vikram (Randhir Kapoor) has also taken a path that goes against the one he travels. Vikram has been engaged to a pretty but poor girl Reshmi (Swaroop Sampat). Now the question begins to haunt Seth Dhanpat Rai. What is more important: Children's happiness or power and money?Dhanpat Rai's question is answered soon.

== Cast ==
- Sanjeev Kumar as Dhanpat Rai Mehta
- Shashi Kapoor as Inspector Ravi Malhotra
- Randhir Kapoor as Vikram Mehta (Vicky)
- Manmohan Krishna as Lala Dinanath Malhotra
- Waheeda Rehman as Anju Mehta
- Poonam Dhillon as Sonia Mehta
- Swaroop Sampat as Reshmi Singh
- Prem Chopra as Shamsher Singh
- Madan Puri as Govindram
- Helen as Cabaret Dancer
- Kalpana Iyer as Cabaret Dancer
- Padma Khanna as Courtesan
- Jagdish Raj as Inspector Jagdish
- Mac Mohan as Mac
- Yunus Parvez as Yunus
- Vikas Anand as Vikas Anand
- Avtar Gill as Lal Singh
- Anjan Srivastav as Dinanath's Boss
- Kamal Kapoor
- Gautam Sarin as sniper killer

== Crew ==
- Director – Ramesh Talwar
- Story – Surinder Prakash
- Screenplay – Sagar Sarhadi
- Producer – Yash Chopra
- Production Company – Yash Raj Films
- Editor – B. Mangeshkar
- Cinematographer – Kay Gee
- Art Director – Studio Diwakar, Sudhendu Roy
- Costume Designer – Akbar Gabbana, Allan Gill, Bhanu Athaiya, Jennifer Kapoor, Kuki Malhotra, Mani Rabadi, Pamela Chopra
- Choreographer – Gopi Krishna, Oscar, Suresh Bhatt, Vijay
- Music Director – Khayyam
- Lyricist – Majrooh Sultanpuri
- Playback Singers – Anwar, Asha Bhosle, Jagjit Kaur, Kishore Kumar, Lata Mangeshkar, Nitin Mukesh, Pamela Chopra, Bhupinder Singh

== Soundtrack ==
All lyrics are written by Majrooh Sultanpuri; all music is composed by Khayyam.

No.	Title	Singer(s)	Length
1.	"Ab Jaan Rahe Ya Jaye"	Lata Mangeshkar, Nitin Mukesh	4:10
2.	"Aisa Kuchh Kare"	Kishore Kumar	1:25
3.	"Dilruba Hoon Dilruba"	Asha Bhosle	4:40
4.	"Idhar Aa Sitamgar"	Pamela Chopra, Jagjit Kaur	4:55
5.	"Maana Churaoge Badan"	Kishore Kumar, Asha Bhosle	5:00
6.	"Sab Ki Nigah Men Sawaal Hai"	Asha Bhosle	3:55
7.	"Yeh Safar"	Lata Mangeshkar, Anwar	4:20
8.	"Zindagi Haseen Hai"	Kishore Kumar, Bhupinder Singh	5:35
