= Maharashtra State Film Award for Best Make-up =

Indian film award

- Awarded for: Best make-up in a Marathi film
- Reward: ₹100,000 (US$1,100)
- First award: 1984
- Final award: 2024

Highlights
- Total awarded: 39
- First winner: Vishwanath Govekar
- Last winner: Sanjay Singh; Santosh Gilbile

The Maharashtra State Film Award for Best Make-up is an award begun in 1984, and presented annually at the Maharashtra State Film Awards of India to an actor for best performance in a Marathi cinema film. The awardees are decided by a jury constituted every year. They are announced by the Minister for Cultural Affairs and are presented by the chief Minister.

== Winners ==
Year	Recipient(s)	Film	Ref.
1984	Vishwanath Govekar	Hech Maze Maher	
1985	Ramesh Nohate	Ardhangi	
1986	Nityanand	Khara Varasdar	
1987	Vishwanath Govekar	Prem Karuya Khulllam Khulla	
1988	Mohan Pathare	Maza Pati Karodpati	
1989	Shyam Dalvi	Suryoday	
1990	Mohan Pathare	Eka Peksha Ek	
1991	Vilas Kudalkar	Chaukat Raja	
1992	Ashok Shirsat	Aapli Mansa	
1993	Pandhari Juker	Paisa Paisa Paisa	
1994	Manohar Dalvi	Bhasma	
1994	Ajit Vengurlekar	Bhasma	
1995	Mahadev Dalvi	Jamla Ho Jamla	
1996	Not Awarded		
1997	Not Awarded		
1998	Vikram Gaikwad	Tu Tithe Mee	
1999	Vikram Gaikwad	Gharabaher	
2000	Anil Pemgirikar	Dhyaas Parva	
2001	Nilesh Mistry	Devki	
2002	Sadanand Suryavanshi	Owalini	
2003	Raju Nok	Anahat	
2003	Shailesh Pawar	Anahat	
2004	Sandip Jadhav	Khandobachya Navana	
2004	Vilas Pavaskar	Khandobachya Navana	
2005	Not Awarded		
2006	Sunil Sawant	Shambhu Maza Navsacha	
2007	Pandhari Juker	Kadachit	
2008	Kiran Sawant	Marmabandh	
2009	Henry Martin	Mi Shivajiraje Bhosale Boltoy!	
2010	Anil Pemgirikar	Agadbam	
2011	Vikram Gaikwad	Balgandharva	
2012	Vikram Gaikwad	Kaksparsh	
2012	Henry Martin	Kaksparsh	
2013	B. T. Sharma	Taani	
2014	Raju Ambulkar	Khwada	
2015	Vikram Gaikwad	Katyar Kaljat Ghusali	
2016	Vidyadhar Bhatte	Ekk Albela	
2017	Shrikant Desai	Redu	
2018	Santosh Gayake	Nude	
2019	Sanika Gadgil	Fatteshikast	
2020	Saurabh Kapde	Me Vasantrao	
2021	Pooja Vishwakarma	Halgat	
2022	Ujjwala Singh	Tath Kana	
2023	Hammid Sheikh	Hazar Vela Sholay Pahilela Manus	
2023	Manali Bhosle	Hazar Vela Sholay Pahilela Manus	
2024	Sanjay Singh	Mangla	
2024	Santosh Gilbile	Dharmarakshak Mahaveer Chhatrapati Sambhaji Maharaj	

== Multiple wins ==
Individuals with two or more Best make-up Awards:

Wins	Recipients
5	Vikram Gaikwad
2	Pandhari Juker; Vishwanath Govekar; Henry Martin; Mohan Pathare; Anil Pemgirikar
