= Noorie =

- Directed by: Manmohan Krishna
- Written by: Sagar Sarhadi
- Produced by: Yash Chopra
- Starring: Farooq Shaikh; Poonam Dhillon; Madan Puri
- Music by: Khayyam; Jan Nisar Akhtar (lyrics); Naqsh Lyallpuri (lyrics)
- Production company: Yash Raj Films
- Distributed by: Yash Raj Films
- Release date: 11 May 1979
- Running time: 114min
- Country: India
- Language: Hindi-Urdu
- Box office: ₹50 million (US$6.14 million) (India)

Noorie is a 1979 Indian romance film produced by Yash Chopra, and directed by Manmohan Krishna; this is his only film as director. The film stars Farooq Shaikh, Poonam Dhillon, Madan Puri and Iftekhar. The film's music is by Khayyam and the lyrics by Jan Nisar Akhtar.

The film was a "Super-Hit" and the seventh highest-grossing film at the Indian box office in 1979. It was also an overseas hit in China, where it released in 1981, and became one of the most successful Indian films in China at the time, along with Awaara and Caravan.

== Plot ==
Noorie (Poonam Dhillon) lives in the Bhaderwah valleys with her father, Ghulam Nabi (Iftekhar) and her dog Khairoo. She has a boyfriend Yusuf (Farooq Shaikh), they decide to get married, the date is decided and preparations begin. Another villager, Bashir Khan (Bharat Kapoor), takes a liking to Noorie and approaches Noorie's father for her hand in marriage, to which Ghulam Nabi refuses. An angry Bashir Khan then arranges the murder of Gulam Nabi, through his men, using a falling tree. The marriage is suspended, and few months later when the marriage preparations are back on, Bashir Khan, who happens to be Yusuf's boss, sends him on an errand out of town. While Yusuf is away, Bashir Khan goes to Noorie's house and brutally rapes her. Noorie commits suicide and Yusuf learns of everything upon his return. So, followed by Khairoo, he runs behind Bashir to kill him. They end up in a physical fight and Yusuf gets shot by Bashir. As Bashir runs back, he finds Khairoo there, who finally kills Bashir. Yusuf runs to the place where Noorie's body is and dies there. They both are buried and unite with each other in death.

== Cast ==
- Farooque Shaikh as Yusuf Fakir Mohammed
- Poonam Dhillon as Noorie Nabi
- Madan Puri as Lala Karamchand
- Iftekhar as Ghulam Nabi
- Padma Khanna as Courtesan
- Gita Siddharth as Karamchand's daughter-in-law
- Javed Khan as Faulad Khan
- Bharat Kapoor as Basheer Khan
- Avtar Gill as Basheer's friend
- Khairoo as Dog
- Manmohan Krishna as Saiji (Storyteller)

== Soundtrack ==
The following tracks were composed by Khayyam, with lyrics by Jan Nisar Akhtar, Naqsh Lyallpuri and Majrooh Sultanpuri.

Noorie

Soundtrack album by Khayyam
- Released: 1979 (India)
- Genre: Film soundtrack
- Label: EMI
- Producer: Khayyam

Khayyam chronology
Trishul (1978)	Noorie (1979)	Khandaan (1979)

#	Title	Singer(s)	Lyricist	Duration
1	"Aaja Re O Mere Dilbar Aaja" – I	Lata Mangeshkar, Nitin Mukesh	Jan Nisar Akhtar	04:58
2	"Chori Chori Koi Aaye"	Lata Mangeshkar	Naqsh Lyallpuri	05:04
3	"Qadar Tune Na Jani"	Asha Bhosle	Naqsh Lyallpuri	05:12
4	"Uske Khel Nirale Wohi Jane"	Pamela Chopra, Jagjit Kaur, Anwar	Majrooh Sultanpuri	04:54
5	"Aashiq Ho To Aisa Ho" (Qawwali)	Pamela Chopra, Mahendra Kapoor, Jagjit Kaur, S.K. Mahan	Jan Nisar Akhtar	06:31
6	"Aaja Re O Mere Dilbar Aaja" – II	Lata Mangeshkar, Nitin Mukesh	Jan Nisar Akhtar	05:03

Two songs are set in Hindustani ragas: "Aaja Re O Mere Dilbar Aaja" (both versions, Pahadi) and "Chori Chori Koi Aaye" (Pahadi).

== Awards ==
27th Filmfare Awards:

Nominated

- Best Film – Yash Chopra
- Best Director – Manmohan Krishna
- Best Actress – Poonam Dhillon
- Best Music Director – Khayyam
- Best Lyricist – Jan Nisar Akhtar for "Aaja Re"
- Best Male Playback Singer – Nitin Mukesh for "Aaja Re"

== Trivia ==
Teri Meherbaniyan (1985) was copy of this film, starring also Poonam Dhillon and with a wonder dog too.
