= Ramesh Talwar =

Indian film director

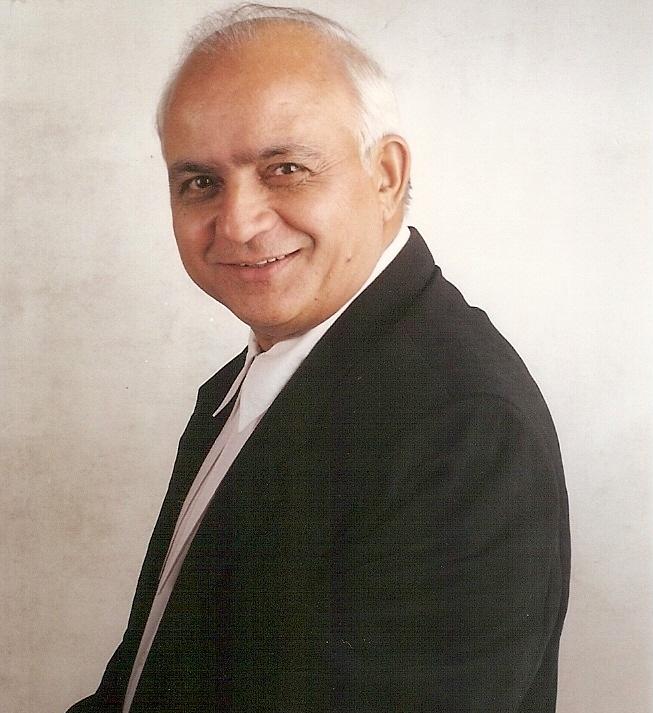
- Born: Ramesh Attarchand Talwar; 27 September 1944 (age 81); Baffa, Abbottabad, British India
- Occupations: Film, theatre, television director
- Years active: 1969 – present

Ramesh Talwar is an Indian film, theatre, television and film director, co-producer and actor. He is the nephew of the film writer, short story writer and playwright Sagar Sarhadi. Talwar began his career as a child artist in Love in Simla (1960), Dhool Ka Phool (1959) and Phool Aur Kaliyan (1960) (produced by V Shantaram; directed by Ram Gabale) which was a National Award winner – Gold medal for best children's film.

He was Yash Chopra's assistant director between 1969 and 1979 and directed several films 1977 onwards. He is best known for directing – Baseraa (1981) which garnered him a Filmfare Best Director Award nomination and Doosra Aadmi. He is also known for directing numerous plays in theatre.

== Career ==
Talwar began as an assistant director in 1969 on the film Ittefaq to Yash Chopra and assisted Yash Chopra in 7 films from 1969 to 1979.

Talwar's first film as director, Doosra Aadmi (1977), which starred Raakhee, Rishi Kapoor, Neetu Singh, Deven Verma, Parikshat Sahni and in special appearance Shashi Kapoor. His debut film received several Filmfare Award nominations for its lead heroine Rakhee. He co-produced only one movie – Noorie in 1978. Among his 7 directorial ventures, only Basera and Zamana (1985) managed to be successful. He made his debut as Theatre Director in 1963 and continued as one till 1983 after which he decided to concentrate on making films and tele films and tele serials. He made a comeback as theatre director in 1998 and has continued to work in this field till date. He has directed many theatre plays since 1963 to 2014.

His next film Aaj Phir Jeene ki Tamannaa Hai, starring Shatrughan Sinha, Rekha, Satish Shah and Hrishitaa Bhatt is yet to be released. The film is produced by Punam S Sinha and Kamia Mulhotra.

Besides his dedication towards films, Talwar has been an Ardent Theatre personality as well. His association with theatre goes back to his childhood days when he joint Juhu Art Theatre which had personalities as members in the likes of Balraj Sahni. Udhali Hoi Kudi a Punjabi play was his prominent first play with Balraj Sahni in 1957. He was active as a theatre actor from 1959 to 1974. Acting took a back seat from 1975 to 1998 when he chose to be assistant director, later director in films, then tele films, tele serials and as theatre director. He made a comeback to theatre acting in 1999.

During his college days he actively participated in the intercollegiate drama competitions as a director and actor.

In 1968, Talwar joint IPTA (Indian Peoples Theatre Association) Bombay. He has done many plays with IPTA over the years. Some of his works are Shatranj Ke Mohre which inaugurated in 1971, Tanhai, Apan Toh Bhai Aise Hain, Kashmakash, Hum Deewane Hum Parwane, Aalll izz well with Shuturmurg, etc. In 1972, Talwar formulated and organised IPTA's first ICDC (Intercollegiate Drama Competition) which is a stage for young students to showcase their talent in front of dignitaries of the industry. IPTA's ICDC completed its 43rd year in 2014.

Talwar's play Sheeshon ka Masiha (IPTA) written by Urdu writer Dr.Fayyaz Ahmed Faizi, is based on the life and times of Faiz Ahmed Faiz the poet and writer. Also his play Kaifi Aur Main (IPTA), which is based on the autobiographical work of the poet, writer, lyricist and freedom fighter Kaifi Azmi's wife Shaukat Azmi. The play highlights her journey of life and love with her husband Kaifi Azmi. The cast of both the plays is Shabana Azmi, Javed Akhtar and Jaswinder Singh.

Apart from IPTA, Talwar has done some plays with various film personalities. These plays have been performed in many countries around the world. The plays are Khoobsurat (1998) with Pooja Bhatt, Maa Retire Hoti Hai (1999) and Dr Mukta (2000) with Jaya Bachchan, Pati, Patni aur Main (2002) with Shatrughan Sinha and Chupkay Chupkay with Zeenat Aman and then Kabuliwala / Kabuliwala Laut Aaya starring Tanvi Azmi.

In 2010 he made his debut in TV as an actor when he played "Bhawanji Bha" in a Television Serial Mukti Bandhan which was aired on Colors.

Also, he has been a Jury Member for Screen Awards, Filmfare Awards and Indian Films Panorama, 3rd Eye Film festival awards and Mumbai Film Festival (MAMI) and the Chairman of Jury (TV awards by Screen) over the last few years.

Ramesh Behl's wife is the daughter of actor and film-maker Kamal Kapoor. Kamal Kapoor was a first cousin of actor Prithviraj Kapoor (their mothers were sisters).

== Filmography ==
=== As child artist ===
- Dhool Ka Phool (1959)
- Love in Shimla (1960)

=== As film assistant director ===
- Ittefaq (1969)
- Daag: A Poem of Love (1973)
- Joshila (1973)
- Deewaar(1975)
- Kabhi Kabhie – Love Is Life (1976)
- Trishul (1978)
- Kaala Patthar (1979)

=== As film director ===
- Doosara Aadmi (1977)
- Baseraa (1981)
- Sawaal (1982)
- Duniya (1984)
- Zamana (1985)
- Sahibaan (1993)

=== As film co-producer ===
- Noorie (1979)

=== As television film director ===
- Tera Naam Mera Naam (Tele Feature-Produced as well) (1996)
- Nimantran (1999)

=== As television serial director ===
- Mashaal (1989)
- Aarzoo (1995)
- Rangoli (1997)
- Chitrahaar (1998)

=== As television actor ===
- Mukti Bandhan (2011)

=== As theatre actor ===
- Shatranj Ke Mohre (1971 – running till date)
- Tanhai (1971)

=== As theatre director ===
- Dekh Kabira Roya (1966)
- Mirza Sahiba (1967)
- Shatranj Ke Mohre (1971 – running till date)
- Tanhai (1971)
- Doosra Aadmi(1974)
- Khoobsurat (1999)
- Kashmakash (2004)
- Hum Deewane Hum Parwane (2017)
