= New Road =

New Road may refer to:

- New Road, Bangkok, the former name of Charoen Krung Road
- New Road, London, England, now part of the London Inner Ring Road
- New Road, Oxford, England, location of Oxford Castle
- New Road, Worcester, England, home ground of Worcestershire County Cricket Club
- New Road of Kathmandu, a high street and financial hub of Kathmandu, Nepal
- New Road, Macau, the nickname of Avenida de Almeida Ribeiro
- The New Road, a Scottish novel by Neil Munro, adapted as a BBC TV serial
- New Road: New Directions In Art & Writing (1943-6), a series of anthologies published by Wrey Gardiner
- Naya Raasta (lit. 'New Road') 1970 Indian Hindi-language drama film
