= Naqsh Lyallpuri =

Indian ghazal and film lyricist

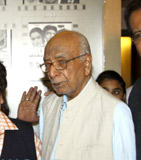
- Born: Jaswant Rai Sharma; 24 February 1928; Lyallpur (now called Faisalabad), Punjab, British India
- Died: 22 January 2017 (aged 88); Mumbai, Maharashtra, India
- Occupation: Lyricist
- Years active: 1953–2007

Jaswant Rai Sharma (24 February 1928 – 22 January 2017), popularly known by his pen name Naqsh Lyallpuri, was an Indian ghazal and Hindi language film lyricist. He is best known for the songs "Rasm-e-Ulfat Ko Nibhayen" (Dil Ki Rahen, 1973), “Ulfat Mein Zamaane Ki” (Call Girl, 1974), "Tumhe Ho Na Ho" (Gharonda, 1977), Piya Tum Ho Sagar (Tumhare Liye 1978), "Yeh Mulaqaat Ek Bahana Hai " (Khandaan, 1979), "Pyar Ka Dard Hai" (Dard, 1981), and "Chitthiye Ni Dard Firaaq Vaaliye" (Henna, 1991).

== Early life ==
Jaswant Rai was born in Lyallpur (now called Faisalabad and in present-day Pakistan) on 24 February 1928 to a Punjabi carpenter Vishwakarma family. His father, a mechanical engineer, wanted Jaswant to be an engineer, too. He disapproved of Jaswant's affinity for literature, saying that he would never be able to earn a living through writing stories and ditties. Sharma was only eight years old when his mother died of chickenpox. His father remarried a couple of years later, something which the young Sharma resented.

In 1946, the 18-year-old Sharma moved to Lahore looking for work and took a job at a publishing house named Hero Publications. After the Partition of India, the entire family migrated to Lucknow in India. In 1951, Sharma moved to Bombay and started working at The Times of India as a proofreader. Around this time, he married Kamlesh, a lady of his own community at Jammu and similar family background, in a match arranged by their families in the usual Indian way. The marriage was conventional and entirely harmonious. Lyallpuri credits his wife as his "pillar of strength" who supported him in his unsuccessful years. The couple had three sons, Bappan, Rajendra, and Suneet. His family members also adopted "Lyallpuri" as their surname. His second son, Rajendra "Rajan" Lyallpuri, is a cinematographer.

== Works ==
Sharma used to write ditties and small poems since a young age. It was a natural talent he had. After the partition of India made the family quite destitute, and his job brought him to Mumbai, which was the hub of the Hindi film industry, Sharma decided to see if he could make some money on the side by writing songs for films. He started writing stage plays and was introduced to actor Ram Mohan, who was an assistant to actor-director Jagdish Sethi. Mohan introduced Sharma to Sethi, who listened to his poetry and asked him to write songs for his next film. At this point, Sharma took on the pen name "Naqsh" – meaning an impression, a mark or a print – and added "Lyallpuri" to it, following the tradition of Urdu poets to associate with their birthplace.

Lyallpuri debuted as a film lyricist with the 1953 film Jaggu, writing the lyrics of "Agar Teri Aankhon Se Aankhein Mila Doon", rendered by Asha Bhosle and composed by Hansraj Bahl. He also penned one of the most memorable Talat Mehmood hits from 1956 film "Diwali Ki raat", "zindagi kis mod par" with music director Snehal Bhatkar.

Until the 1970s, Lyallpuri's work did not meet with much success. He worked first at the Times of India and then in the postal department to earn his living. Music director Jaidev introduced him to television serials and asked him to write lyrics for the Hindi television series Shrikant. Lyallpuri went on to write songs for about 50 TV serials along with nearly 40 Punjabi films.

Lyallpuri collaborated with various Bollywood music directors, including Madan Mohan, Khayyam, Sapan Jagmohan, Jaidev, Naushad, and Ravindra Jain, and Punjabi music composers like Surinder Kohli, Hansraj Bahl, Ved Sethi, and Husnlal-Bhagatram. He had a close association with director B. R. Ishara from their first film, Chetna, in 1970, which Lyallpuri's song "Main Toh Har Mod Par Tujhko Doonga Sada" performed by Mukesh.

Lyallpuri's songs have been noted for being "hummable", although they did not make a major impact on the overall industry. He avoided unwarranted wordplay and kept the lyrics simple, although he used Urdu words frequently. His command of Urdu made many doubt his Punjabi ethnicity. In his earlier career, he faced competition from Sahir Ludhianvi, Hasrat Jaipuri, and Shailendra and later from other Urdu-poets like Gulzar and Majrooh Sultanpuri, who were all well established in the Hindi film industry. Lyallpuri hence focused on Hindi B-grade films and Punjabi films. His 1973 song "Rasm-e-Ulfat Ko Nibhayen" for the film Dil Ki Rahen was sung by Lata Mangeshkar. Mangeshkar counts it as her favourite Lyallpuri song but gives credit for its success to the music composed by Madan Mohan, based on raag Madhuvanti and the lyrics written by Lyallpuri, rather than her own singing.

Lyallpuri is best known for the song "Tumhe Ho Na Ho" from the film Gharonda (1977), sung by Bangladeshi singer Runa Laila. The song is often wrongly ascribed to Gulzar, who wrote the other songs in the film, whereas the song "Do Deewane Shahar Mein" in the same film is misattributed to Lyallpuri. The 1979 song "Yeh Mulaqaat Ek Bahana Hai" in the film Khandaan is noted for its unusual ghazal format. His "Pyar Ka Dard Hai" from the 1981 film Dard has been lauded for Kishore Kumar's soft singing and for using "everyday lyrics". He also wrote the only Punjabi song "Chitthiye Ni Dard Firaaq Vaaliye" in the film Henna (1991).

""DK Bose" (Delhi Belly) isn't good poetry. It's a degradation of the medium. Don't tell me that's what the masses want because that's a weak argument. The truth is listeners don't have a choice",
– Lyallpuri criticizing the use of profanity in contemporary songs

Lyallpuri published two books: Teri Gali Ki Taref (On Your Street) is a collection of his non-film shayari and Angan Angan Barse Geet features his songs from films, television serials, and music albums.

Lyallpuri took a sabbatical from films in the 1990s, disliking the lyrical style prevalent then, some using profanity and continued with television. He returned in the 2000s penning lyrics for the films Taj Mahal: An Eternal Love Story (2005) and Yatra (2007), collaborating with his earlier music directors Naushad and Khayyam, respectively. He was a founding member of the Indian Performing Rights Society, which works for royalty rights of music directors and lyricists.

Selective filmography

- 1952 – Jaggu
- 1955 – Ghamand
- 1958 – Rifle Girl
- 1959 – Circus Queen
- 1960 – Choron Ki Baraat
- 1960 – Road No. 303
- 1968 - Teri Talash Mein
- 1970 – Chetna
- 1971 – Man Tera Tan Mera
- 1972 – Man Jaiye
- 1973 – Dil Ki Rahen
- 1974 – Parinay
- 1974 – Call Girl
- 1977 – Gharonda
- 1975 – Kaagaz Ki Nao
- 1978 – Tumhare Liye
- 1979 – Khandaan
- 1981 – Ahista Ahista
- 1981 – Dard
- 1982 – Dil-e-Nadaan
- 1985 – Kala Suraj
- 1991 – Heena
- 2005 – Taj Mahal: An Eternal Love Story
- 2007 – Yatra

== Death ==
Lyallpuri suffered from a hip bone fracture in March 2016 and was hospitalized in October 2016. He died on 22 January 2017 at the age of 88 at his residence in Andheri, Mumbai and his funeral took place at the Oshiwara crematorium.
