= Shagoon =

- Directed by: Nazar
- Written by: Jalal Malihabadi
- Story by: Raj Marbros
- Produced by: Sohan Lal Grover; Nazar; Suraiya Mubin
- Narrated by: Waheeda Rehman; Kamaljeet
- Cinematography: Anwar Siraj
- Edited by: Das Dhaimade
- Music by: Khayyam; Sahir Ludhianvi (lyrics)
- Release date: 1964
- Country: India
- Languages: Hindi; Urdu

Shagoon is a 1964 Indian Hindi drama film directed by Nazar. The film stars Waheeda Rehman, Kamaljeet, Nazir Hussain, Achla Sachdev, Nivedita (Libi Rana), Pratima Devi, Chand Usmani and Nana Palsikar. The film was shot at Mehboob Studios in Bombay and Nainital.

The film had music by Khayyam with lyrics Sahir Ludhianvi, creating memorable songs like "Parbaton Ke Pedon Par Shaam" sung by Mohammed Rafi and Suman Kalyanpur and "Tum Apna Ranj-o-gham" by Jagjit Kaur.

The songs "Parbaton Ke Pedon Par Shaam" and "Tum Apna Ranj-o-gham" are set in raga Pahadi.

== Plot ==
While on a trip to Nainital, Geeta (Waheeda Rehman) meets Madan (Kamaljit) and falls in love with him. Madan is from Delhi and his father is a wealthy man. His mother played by Achla Sachdev is a superstitious woman who constantly gets poojas performed by pandits. Madan expresses his desire to marry Geeta and his parents agree to his request. But the family pandit studies Geeta's horoscope and reveals that she is a manglik and hence inauspicious. Being a manglik or having Mangal Dosha is considered unfortunate as per Indian astrology.

== Cast ==
- Waheeda Rehman as Geeta (a manglik)
- Kamaljit Singh as Madan
- Nazir Hussain as Rai Saheb
- Nana Palsikar as Girdharilal manager
- Achla Sachdev as Madan's mother
- Pratima Devi (Hindi actress)as Geeta's mother
- Chand Usmani as Mrs. Rai
- Durga Khote
- Libi Rana (Nivedita) as Rekha, Girdarilal's niece
- Master Pradeep as Gappu

== Music ==
Music in the film is by Khayyam with lyrics Sahir Ludhianvi. Album is considered among Khayyam's best work and also reason for him to have landed the Razia Sultan by Kamal Amrohi. Who, after failing to sign Laxmikant Pyarelal, remembered listening to the song "Parbaton Ke Pedon Par", along with his then wife Meena Kumari. Hence he approached and hired Khayyam for his movie Razia Sultan.

- "Parbaton Ke Pedon Par Shaam Ka Basera Tha" – Mohammed Rafi and Suman Kalyanpur
- "Yeh Raat Bahut Rangeen Sahi" – Mohammed Rafi
- "Tum Chali Jaogi Parchhayiyan Reh Jayegi" – Mohammed Rafi
- "Bujha Diye Hain Khud Apne Haathon" – Suman Kalyanpur
- "Itane Qarib Aa Ke Bhi Na Jaane Kis Liye" – Mubarak Begum, Talat Mahmood
- "Zindagi Zulm Sahi Jabr Sahi Gam Hi Sahi" – Suman Kalyanpur
- "Tum Apna Ranj-o-gham" – Jagjit Kaur
- "Gori Sasuraal Chali" – Jagjit Kaur
