= Dharti Kahe Pukar Ke (1969 film) =

- Theatrical release poster
- Directed by: Dulal Guha
- Written by: B.R. Ishara (dialogues)
- Produced by: Deenanath Shastri
- Starring: Nanda; Sanjeev Kumar; Jeetendra
- Narrated by: Dharmendra
- Cinematography: M. Rajaram
- Edited by: G. G. Mayekar
- Music by: Laxmikant–Pyarelal
- Production company: Vaishali Films
- Release date: 21 January 1969
- Running time: 165 mins
- Country: India
- Language: Hindi

Dharti Kahe Pukarke (transl. Call of the Earth) is a 1969 Indian Hindi-language drama film, produced by Deenanath Shastri under the Vaishali Films banner and directed by Dulal Guha. Starring Jeetendra, Nanda, Sanjeev Kumar and music composed by Laxmikant–Pyarelal. The film was remade as Sautela Bhai.

== Plot ==
Gangaram, a farmer, is an elder stepbrother of Moti and Shivram. He and his wife, Parvati raise them both as their own sons. Moti is sent to Calcutta city for studies, and there he becomes a lawyer. Back in the village, Shivram helps Gangaram in cultivating the piece of land they own. To support Moti's education, Gangaram has mortgaged this land to the village moneylender, thinking that Moti will close the debt once he starts earning. The moneylender wishes to marry his daughter, Radha, to Moti and offers to return the land papers without any payment if this is accepted by Gangaram. But, Moti secretly married Rekha in Calcutta and become a Gharjamai to a rich lawyer. Radha is in love with Shivram since their childhood days and desires to marry him. Upon hearing that her father will marry her to Moti, she confesses her secret love to Shivram. The situation becomes perplexed for everyone. Shivram and Moti both come clean to Gangaram of these secret developments and Gangaram reaches a moneylender to request that Shivram marry Radha to Shivram because marrying Moti is not an option now. But the moneylender makes this rejection as his prestige issue and asks Gangaram to return borrowed money within a fortnight or else his land will be confiscated.

Moti had to return to his city life immediately, unaware of these new issues. Shivram is sent back after Moti to fetch some money from him for a loan. But, there Rekha ill-treats Shivram and he immediately returns to the village whining about it. Radha, desperate to marry Shivram, steals her own money, kept safe in her father's locker, and hands it over to Shivram to get rid of the loan. However, this becomes known to the moneylender and he gets Shivram arrested for stealing. Gangaram thus feels lost and cheated by his brothers and starts drinking. A social worker reaches out for the truth and Shivram is released from jail. The moneylender promises Shivram that if he goes out of the village and returns with borrowed money amount in one year, he will stop troubling them and also would be able to marry his daughter somewhere else peacefully. So Shiv moves to the city and starts earning his living as a cab driver.

Meanwhile, Moti had been living away from Rekha due to differences in opinions. Once, by God's grace, Shivram happens to be in the right place at the right time, and saves Rekha from a rape attempt on her. She apologizes to Shivram for her past bad behavior. Things between her and Moti also sort out. But, the moneylender once again strikes back with his evil plans, and Gangaram is sent to jail this time based on forged land documents. Now Moti & Shivram fight his court case with all their strength and wits, and in the end, wins the case. Then the movie ends with pleasant happy endings for all.

== Cast ==
- Jeetendra as Shiv
- Nanda as Radha
- Sanjeev Kumar as Moti
- Libi Rana (credited as Nivedita) as Rekha
- Kanhaiyalal as Gangaram
- Durga Khote as Parbatiya and Gangaram's wife
- Tarun Bose as Mahendra Babu - Rekha's father
- Abhi Bhattacharya as Master Mahesh
- Ramayan Tiwari as Hari and Radha's father
- Leela Mishra as Radha's nani
- Asit Sen as Sukhiya
- Manmohan as Daroga
- A. K. Hangal as Sunderlal
- Sujit Kumar as Taxi Driver, Special Appearance

== Soundtrack ==
The music was composed by Laxmikant–Pyarelal and the lyrics were written by Majrooh Sultanpuri

#	Title	Singer(s)	Duration
1	"Dharti Kahe Pukar Ke"	Mohammed Rafi	4:35
2	"Diye Jalaye Pyar Ke Chalo"	Lata Mangeshkar	3:30
3	"Ja Ra Kare Badra"	Lata Mangeshkar	4:35
4	"Je Hum Tum Chori Se"	Lata Mangeshkar, Mukesh	3:30
5	" Khushi Ki Woh Raat Aa Gayi"	Mukesh	5:35
