= Kamaljeet =

Indian actor

- Born: Shashi Rekhi
- Died: 21 November 2000
- Other names: Kamal Jeet, Kamaljit
- Occupation: Actor
- Known for: Son of India, Shagoon
- Spouse: Waheeda Rehman (m. 1974)
- Children: 2

Kamaljeet (born Shashi Rekhi) was an Indian actor in Hindi language films. His major work includes Son of India and Shagoon (co-starring Waheeda Rehman).

== Personal life ==
Shashi Rekhi ( Kamaljeet) married Indian actress Waheeda Rehman in 1974. The couple had a daughter and son – Kashvi and Sohail.

== Filmography ==
- 1992 Heer Ranjha
- 1988 Tamacha
- 1970 Veer Ghatotkach
- 1964 Qawwali Ki Raat
- 1964 Shagoon
- 1964 Vidyapati
- 1962 Sher Khan
- 1962 Son of India
- 1961 Mr. India
- 1957 Kitna Badal Gaya Insaan
- 1957 Zamana
- 1956 Kismet Ka Khel
- 1956 Mr. Lambu
- 1956 Shart
- 1956 Hum rahe na hum
