= Deewana Hoon Pagal Nahi =

1998 film

Deewana Hoon Pagal Nahi (transl. Crazy, not insane) is a 1998 Hindi film starring Ayesha Jhulka and Vikas Bhalla in the lead.

== Soundtrack ==
1. "Sone Jaisa Roop Hai Inka Rang Hai Inka" - Udit Narayan, Poornima
2. "Bhabhi Dil Ki Bholi Tu Kitni Bhali Hai" - Babla Mehta, Alka Yagnik
3. "English Gana Russi Gane Upar Gana" - Kavita Krishnamurthy, Sonu Nigam
4. "Nazaro Me Rang Hai Tumhare Labo Ka" - Udit Narayan, Alka Yagnik
5. "Jab Se Mile Do Dil Ban Ne Lagi Dastan" - Vijeta Pandit, Kumar Sanu
6. "Jhumka Bhi Jhume" - Ila Arun
7. "Maiya Ki Ankho Ka" - Pamela Chopra, Suresh Wadkar
8. "Tere Naam Se Hai Jana" - Bela Sulakhe, Nitin Mukesh
