= Mohammed Zahur Khayyam =

Indian music director and composer (1927–2019)

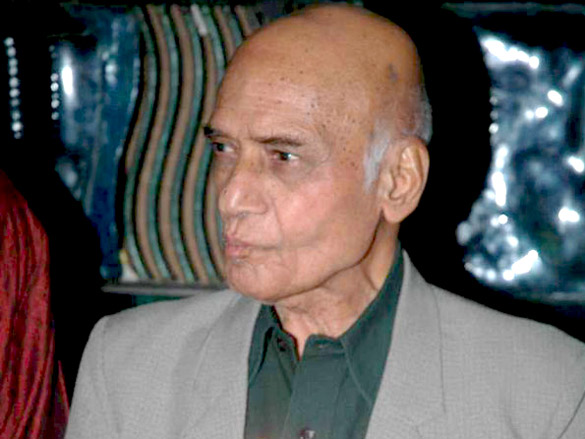
- Khayyam at his 85th birthday bash in 2012
- Born: 18 February 1927; Rahon, Punjab, British India
- Died: 19 August 2019 (aged 92); Mumbai, Maharashtra, India
- Occupations: Music director, film score composer
- Known for: Umrao Jaan; Kabhi Kabhie; Noorie; Thodisi Bewafaii; Dil-e-Nadaan; Razia Sultan
- Spouse: Jagjit Kaur (m. 1954)
- Children: 1
- Honours: Padma Bhushan

Mohammed Zahur Khayyam Hashmi (18 February 1927 – 19 August 2019), better known mononymously as Khayyam, was an Indian music director and background score composer whose career spanned four decades.

He won three Filmfare Awards: for Best Music in 1977 for Kabhie Kabhie and in 1982 for Umrao Jaan, and a lifetime achievement award in 2010. He was awarded the 2007 Sangeet Natak Akademi Award in Creative Music, by the Sangeet Natak Akademi, India's National Academy of Music, Dance and Theatre. He was awarded the third-highest civilian honour, Padma Bhushan, by the Government of India in 2011.

== Early life ==
Khayyam was born to a Punjabi Muslim family on 18 February 1927 in Rahon in Punjab, British India. As a boy, Khayyam ran away to his uncle's house in New Delhi. There he was trained under classical vocalist and composer Pandit Amarnath.

== Career ==
Khayyam went to Lahore looking for roles in films. There he met Baba Chishti, a famous Punjabi music director. After listening to a composition by Chishti, he sang to him its first part. Impressed, Chishti gave him an offer of joining him as an assistant. Khayyam assisted Chishti for six months and came to Ludhiana in 1943. He was only 17 then.

After a stint in the Army in the Second World War, Khayyam went to Bombay to fulfil his dream and made his debut as Sharmaji of the Sharmaji-Varmaji composer duo with the film Heer Ranjha in 1948. He went solo after his co-composer Rehman Verma went to the newly created Pakistan post partition. One of his earliest breaks was in the film Biwi (1950) in which the song "Akele Mein Woh Ghabrate To Honge" sung by Mohammed Rafi was a hit. "Shaam-e-Gham Ki Kasam" sung by Talat Mehmood from the film Footpath (1953) struck a chord among the masses. He gained greater recognition from the film Phir Subha Hogi (1958) starring Raj Kapoor and Mala Sinha, in which songs written by Sahir Ludhianvi and sung by Mukesh and Asha Bhosle were set to tune by Khayyam. Notable amongst them are "Wo Subha Kabhi To Aayegi", "Aasman Pe hai Khuda Aur Zameen Pe Hum" and "Chin-o-Arab Humara".

Songs from the film Shola Aur Shabnam (1961) written by Kaifi Azmi established Khayyam's reputation as a composer. From the Chetan Anand directed Aakhri Khat (1966) "Baharon Mera Jeevan Bhi Sawaron" by Lata and "Aur Kuch Der Theher" by Rafi were huge hits. Other notable songs are from the film Shagoon (1964) which had Khayyam's wife Jagjit Kaur sing "Tum Apna Ranj-o-Gham" and "Tum Chali Jaogi", a duet "Parbaton Ke Pedon Par" by Mohammed Rafi and Suman Kalyanpur, and "Bujha Diye Hain Khud Apne Haathon" by Suman Kalyanpur. Other popular songs are from the film "Mohabbat Isko Kahete Hain" (1965). That includes "Thehriye Hosh Mein Aa Loon" which is a Rafi - Suman duet, and "Jo Hum Pe Guzarti Hai" by Suman Kalyanpur.

The 1970s saw Khayyam team up with Sahir Ludhyanvi once again to work in the Yash Chopra-directed Kabhi Kabhie (1976). The songs showed Khayyam's versatility with hits such as "Kabhi Kabhi Mere Dil Mein Khayal Aata Hai" (Sung by Mukesh and Lata), "Tere Chehre Se Nazar Nahin" (by Kishore & Lata) and "Main Pal Do Pal Ka Shayar Hoon" (by Mukesh).

Khayyam provided music to the films of the late 1970s and early 1980s. Songs from Trishul, Thodi Si Bewafaai, Bazaar, Dard, Noorie, Nakhuda, Sawaal, Bepannah, and Khandaan are some of his best works.

Khayyam was still to deliver his best, and the opportunity came in Muzaffar Ali's Umrao Jaan in 1981. He had Asha Bhonsle sing the songs "In Aankhon Ki Masti Ke", "Ye Kya Jagah Hai Doston", and "Dil Cheez Kya Hai", which are evergreen.

Rajesh Khanna liked the songs of the film Kabhi Kabhie so much that he gifted Khayyam one of his cars. Subsequently, Khayyam composed music for Thodisi Bewafai, Dard (both 1981) and Dil-e-Nadaan (1982), all of them starring Khanna in the lead.

Khayyam created music for the Kamal Amrohi directed film Razia Sultan (1983) and his song "Aye Dil-e-Nadan" sung by Lata is considered a milestone.

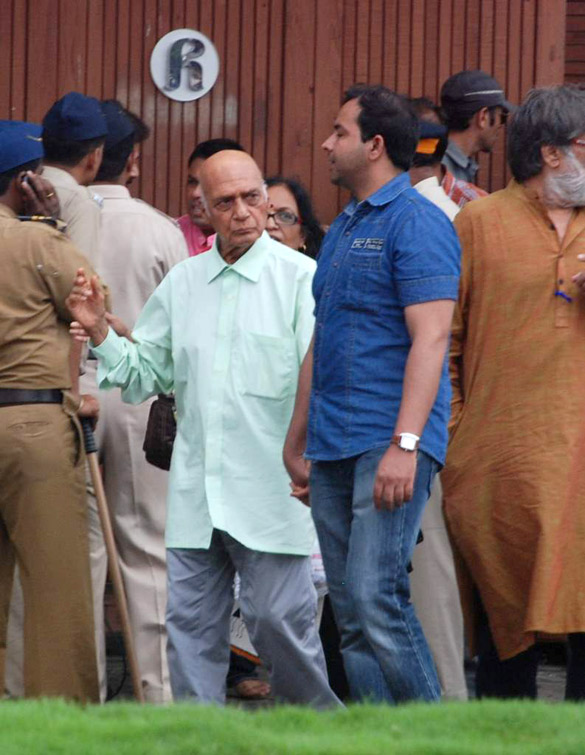
Khayyam in 2012

He also composed non-film songs. Some of them include "Paaon Padun Tore Shyam, Brij Mein Laut Chalo" and "Ghazab Kiya Tere Vaade Pe Aitbaar Kiya". He also gave music for Meena Kumari's album, I Write, I Recite (1971), featuring the "nazms" written and sung by her.

Khayyam always preferred to work with poets rather than film lyricists. That is the reason one finds poetry playing an equal role in Khayyam's compositions as the music or the singer. Khayyam preferred to give full freedom to the poets for expressing their views thereby making the expression of songs more poetic and meaningful.

He worked with both his contemporaries in the field of poetry. That's the reason one finds in his account the work profiled by Mirza Ghalib, Daagh, Wali Mohammed Wali, Ali Sardar Jafri, Majrooh Sultanpuri, Sahir Ludhianvi, and among the new ones Naqsh Lyallpuri, Nida Fazli, Jan Nisar Akhtar and Ahmed Wasi.

Khayyam's music had the touch of ghazal but was rooted in Indian classical music. The compositions were soulful, melodious and emotional, the songs were rich in poetry and purpose and the style was noticeably different from the popular brand of music in those days, which used to be either semi-classical, ghazal or light and peppy.

On his 89th birthday, Khayyam announced the formation of a charitable trust, Khayyam Jagjeet Kaur KPG Charitable Trust, and decided to donate his entire wealth to the trust to support budding artists and technicians in India. His wealth at the time of announcement was valued at around ₹10 crore (US$1.0 million).

He decided not to celebrate his birthday after the terrorist attack on India's border post of Pulwama and donated ₹5 lakh (US$5,200) to the kin of the martyrs.

== Personal life ==
Khayyam married Jagjit Kaur in 1954 in one of the first inter-communal marriages in the Indian film industry. They had a son, Pradeep, who died of a heart attack in 2012. Inspired by their son's helping nature, they started a trust, "Khayyam Jagjit Kaur Charitable Trust" to help artistes and technicians in need.

== Death ==
In his last days, Khayyam was suffering from various age related ailments. On 28 July 2019, Khayyam was admitted to Sujay Hospital in Juhu, Mumbai due to lung infection. He died on 19 August 2019 following a cardiac arrest at the age of 92. He was buried the following day with full state honours.

== Awards and nominations ==
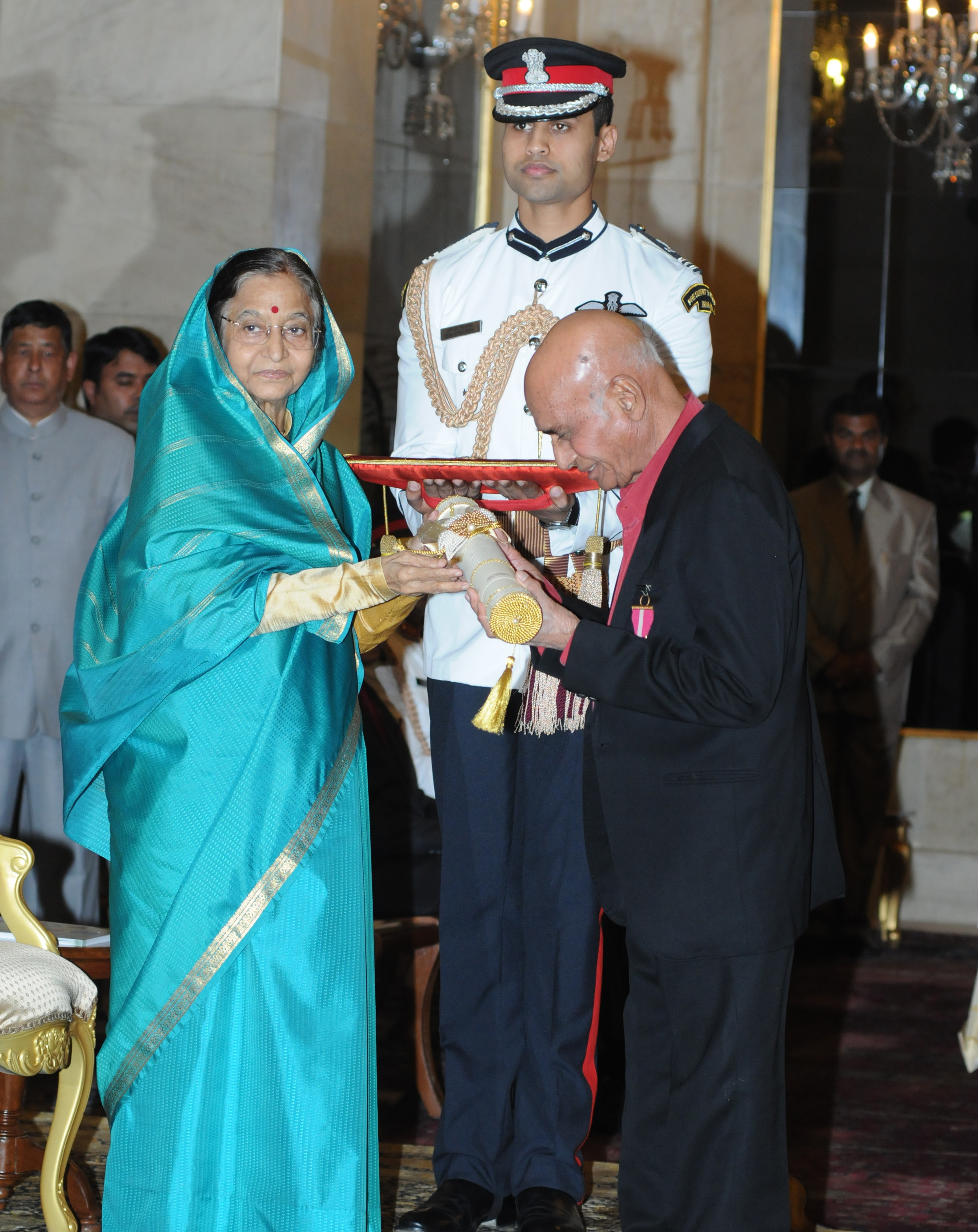
Khayyam being awarded Padma Bhushan by President Pratibha Patil in 2011.

Won

- 1977: Filmfare Best Music Director Award: Kabhi Kabhie
- 1982: Filmfare Best Music Director Award: Umrao Jaan
- 1982: National Film Award for Best Music Direction: Umrao Jaan
- 2007: Sangeet Natak Akademi Award: Creative Music
- 2009: Naushaad Sangeet Samman award
- 2010: Filmfare Lifetime Achievement Award
- 2011: Padma Bhushan
- 2012: Mirchi Music Lifetime Achievement Award
- 2018: Hridaynath Mangeshkar Award

Nominated

- 1980: Filmfare Best Music Director Award: Noorie
- 1981: Filmfare Best Music Director Award: Thodisi Bewafai
- 1982: Filmfare Best Music Director Award: Bazaar
- 1984: Filmfare Best Music Director Award: Razia Sultan

== Filmography ==
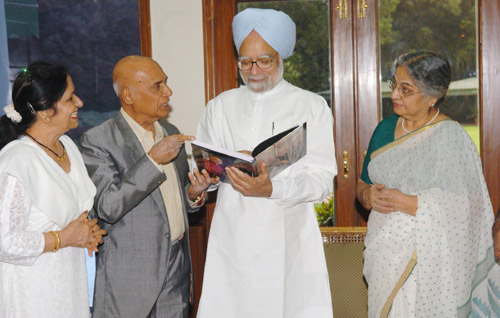
Music Director Khayyam presenting a book titled "Khayyam: The man, His Music" to the Prime Minister Dr. Manmohan Singh

Singer

- Romeo & Juliet (1947) — sang a duet with Zohrabai Ambalewali

Music director

- Heer Ranjha (1948) — as Sharmaji (of Sharmaji-Varmaji duo, with Rahman Varma and Aziz Khan)
- Biwi (1950)
- Pyaar Ki Baatein (1951)
- Foot Path (1953) — adopted the screen name Khayyam.
- Gul Sanobar (1953) — with Bulo C. Rani
- Gul Bahar (1954)
- Dhobi Doctor (1954)
- Tatar Ka Chor (1955)
- Phir Subha Hogi (1958)
- Lala Rukh (1958)
- Barood (1960)
- Bombai Ki Billi (1960)
- Shola Aur Shabnam (1961)
- Shagoon (1964)
- Mohabbat Isko Kahete Hain (1965)
- Aakhri Khat (1966)
- Mera Bhai Mera Dushman (1967)
- I Write, I Recite (1971) — Album consisting of nazms written and sung by Meena Kumari.
- Pyaase Dil (1974)
- Sandhya (1975)
- Mutthi Bhar Chawal (1975)
- Sankalp (1975)
- Kabhi Kabhie (1976)
- Naukar Biwi Da Punjabi black & white Movie The film began principal photography in the mid-1960s and was delayed for several years before being released in 1976
- Shankar Hussain (1977)
- Trishul (1978)
- Khandaan (1979)
- Noorie (1979)
- Meena Kumari ki Amar Kahani (1979)
- Thodi Si Bewafaai (1980)
- Chambal Ki Kasam (1980)
- Nakhuda(1981)
- Umrao Jaan (1981)
- Dard (1981)
- Ahista Ahista (1981)
- Dil-e-Nadaan (1982)
- Bazaar (1982)
- Baawri (1982)
- Sawaal (1982)
- Dil...Akhir Dil Hai (1982)
- Razia Sultan (1983)
- Mehndi (1983)
- Lorie (1984)
- Bepanaah (1985)
- Tere Shahar Mein (1986)
- Anjuman (1986)
- Devar Bhabhi (1986)
- Ek Naya Rishta (1988)
- Parbat Ke Us Paar (1988)
- Jaan-E-Wafa (1990)
- Mohabbaton Ka Safar (1995)
- Ek Hi Manzil (2000)
- Yatra (2007)
- Mission-The Last War (2008)
- Bazaar E Husn (2014)
- Ghulam Bandhu (2016) — Unreleased
