= Libi Rana =

Indian actress

Libi Rana (Nivedita)
- Occupation: Actress
- Years active: 1964–1973, 1996

Libi Rana (Nivedita) was an Indian actress who had acted in Bollywood films like Dharti Kahe Pukar Ke, Shagoon, Jaan (1996), Rocky Mera Naam (1973), Jyoti (1969) and Bank Robbery (1969).
