= Man Ki Aankhen =

- Movie Poster
- Directed by: Raghunath Jhalani
- Written by: Bhakri (Dialogue), Jwalamukhi (Screenplay)
- Produced by: I. A. Nadiadwala
- Starring: Dharmendra; Waheeda Rehman
- Music by: Laxmikant Pyarelal
- Release date: 1970
- Running time: approx 190 minutes
- Country: India
- Language: Hindi

Man Ki Aankhen is a 1970 Indian Hindi language film directed by Raghunath Jhalani.

== Plot ==
After working as a teacher in Delhi for several years, Master Dinanath-ji decides to relocate to a small village to spend the rest of days teaching in a nearby school. His wife and his daughter, Geeta alias Guddi, depend on his meagre teacher's salary for their survival. When one of his ex-students, Rajesh Agarwal, arrives from Delhi to look after his fruit and vegetable business, Dinanath welcomes him into his home. Shortly thereafter, Geeta and Rajesh fall in love and are married in a simple ceremony. Rajesh wanted to marry Geeta first before telling his mother and elder married brother, Naresh, as he is afraid that his dowry-seeking mother would forbid him from marrying Geeta. He hopes that she will ultimately give in and accept Geeta as her daughter-in-law. With this hope, they depart for Delhi. Two months later, Dinanath and his wife receive a letter from Geeta informing them all is well and that her mother-in-law's anger has subsided. Delighted with this news, Dinanath-ji decides to visit Geeta in her palatial house, not knowing that this visit will change his life forever.

== Cast ==
- Dharmendra – as Rajesh Agarwal.
- Waheeda Rehman – as Guddi/Geeta.
- Sujit Kumar – as Naresh Agarwal.
- Faryal – as Vandana N. Agarwal.
- Manmohan Krishna – as Master Dinanath.
- Leela Chitnis – as Mrs Dinanath.
- Mohan Sherry – as Mr Keshav.
- Brahm Bhardwaj – as Rai Bahadur.
- Lalita Pawar – as Mother of Rajesh Agarwal or Naresh Agarwal.

== Songs ==
The music of the movie was composed by Laxmikant Pyarelal. The lyrics were penned by Sahir Ludhianvi.

- "Dil Kahe Ruk Ja re" – Mohammad Rafi
- "Chala Bhi Aa Aaja Rasiya" – Mohammad Rafi, Lata Mangeshkar
- "Aankhe Sharab Ki" – Manna Dey, Lata Mangeshkar
- "Arre Maa Gauri Maa" – Asha Bhosle
- "Bahut Der Tumne Sataya Hai Mujhko" – Asha Bhosle
- "Kya Tum Wohi Ho" – Mohammed Rafi, Suman Kalyanpur
