= Dil-e-Nadaan =

1982 film by C. V. Sridhar

- Directed by: C. V. Sridhar
- Written by: C. V. Sridhar; Charandas Shokh (Dialogues)
- Screenplay by: C. V. Sridhar
- Story by: C. V. Sridhar
- Based on: Ilamai Oonjal Aadukirathu (Tamil)
- Produced by: S. M. Sundaram
- Starring: Rajesh Khanna; Shatrughan Sinha; Jaya Prada; Smita Patil
- Cinematography: R. K. Tiwary
- Edited by: Subba Rao
- Music by: Khayyam
- Release date: January 1982
- Country: India
- Language: Hindi

Dil-e-Nadaan (transl. The innocent heart) is a 1982 Indian Hindi-language romance film directed by C. V. Sridhar. The film stars Rajesh Khanna, Shatrughan Sinha, Jaya Prada and Smita Patil. It is a remake of Sridhar's 1978 Tamil film Ilamai Oonjal Aadukirathu.

== Plot ==
Vikram and Anand are best friends, brought up by their mom. Anand is an orphan who was adopted by the family as a child and he has never been given the impression that he was an outsider. Vikram and Anand are owner and manager respectively, of an advertising agency in Bombay. Both work for the same organization and love the same woman, Asha.

In the organization, Sheela works as a deputy to Anand and is in love with him, though Anand is unaware of this. Sheela continues to harbour love for Anand even after finding out he loves Asha, whom Sheela is friends with and also lives with. Vikram frequents a bus stop daily on his way to office, where he always sees Asha. He instantly decides to propose to her. Vikram discloses to Anand that he wants to marry a girl but does not reveal her name. Meanwhile, Vikram's mother looks for suitable girls for their marriage and declares that she would marry both her sons together on the same day.

Sheela becomes confused as to whether she should continue to love Anand in spite of knowing that Anand and Asha love each other. One day, Sheela meets Vikram and as they talk, she says things that indicate she feels lonely and has lost her loved one to another. The next day, Sheela apologizes to Vikram and asks for a 10-day leave. She decides to go to her hometown to forget Anand. However, Asha joins her, as she learns that Anand is going there as well on a business trip. On a rainy day, Sheela is alone in the house when Anand arrives to meet Asha. He learns that Asha is attending a friend's wedding, but as no train is available for returning, Anand is forced to stay the night. In the midnight, Anand starts feeling cold due to the weather, so he starts drinking. After a few drinks, he starts seeing Sheela as Asha. Despite knowing he is wrong, Sheela and Anand have sex.

In the morning, Anand realizes what has happened and writes a letter to Sheela, asking her to keep the incident a secret for life, as he wants to marry Asha only. However, Asha comes across the letter first and becomes aware of what happened between Sheela and Anand in her absence. She then decides that, as she respects her friendship with Sheela, she will sacrifice her love for Sheela and make Anand marry her instead.

The rest of the story shows what will happen to Vikram and Anand's friendship after this incident.

== Cast ==
- Rajesh Khanna as Anand
- Jaya Prada as Asha
- Shatrughan Sinha as Vikram
- Smita Patil as Sheela
- Om Prakash as Asha's Father
- Dina Pathak as Vikram's Mother
- Shivraj as Sheela's Father
- Agha
- Ashalata
- Jagdish Raj
- Keshto Mukherjee

== Soundtrack ==
The music was composed by Khayyam. Lyrics written by Naqsh Lyallpuri.

Track listing
No.	Title	Lyrics	Singer(s)	Length
1.	"Agar Leta Hoon Tera Naam"	Naqsh Lyallpuri	Kishore Kumar
2.	"Tera Ishq Hai Meri Zindagi"	Naqsh Lyallpuri	Kishore Kumar, Lata Mangeshkar
3.	"Chandni Raat Mein"	Naqsh Lyallpuri	Kishore Kumar, Lata Mangeshkar
4.	"Jab Prem Agan Lag Jaaye"	Naqsh Lyallpuri	Asha Bhosle, Suresh Wadkar
5.	"Dil Tera Hai, Jaan Bhi Hai Teri Piya"	Naqsh Lyallpuri	Asha Bhosle
6.	"Saji Sawaari Sej Ki"	Naqsh Lyallpuri	Asha Bhosle
