= Chehre Pe Chehra =

- Poster
- Directed by: Raj Tilak
- Based on: Strange Case of Dr. Jekyll and Mr. Hyde; 1886 novella by Robert Louis Stevenson
- Produced by: Raj Tilak
- Starring: Sanjeev Kumar; Vinod Mehra; Shatrughan Sinha; Rekha; Sulakshana Pandit
- Cinematography: K. K. Mahajan
- Edited by: Madhu Sinha
- Music by: Songs: N. Dutta; Background Score: Salil Chowdhury
- Release date: March 13, 1981
- Running time: 140 minutes
- Country: India
- Language: Hindi

Chehre Pe Chehra (transl. A face over a face) is a 1981 Indian Hindi-language science fiction film produced and directed by Raj Tilak. It stars Sanjeev Kumar, Vinod Mehra, Shatrughan Sinha, Rekha and Sulakshana Pandit. It is an adaptation of the 1886 novella Strange Case of Dr Jekyll and Mr Hyde by Robert Louis Stevenson.

== Plot ==
Wilson is a scientist who feels that every human has both angelic and devilish elements in themselves. He strongly believes that these two elements can be segregated and then a medicine can be invented to eliminate the undesirable element, while leaving only the desirable element intact. Wilson eventually invents a potion to put his theory into effect. He decides to test the invention on himself. But the result does not occur as he had theorised: although his devilish persona gets segregated from his angelic persona, it is much more powerful, and Wilson is unable to eliminate it.

== Cast ==
- Sanjeev Kumar as Dr. Wilson / Blackstone
- Vinod Mehra as David
- Shatrughan Sinha as Advocate Sinha
- Amol Palekar as Peter
- Rekha as Daisy
- Sulakshana Pandit as Diana
- Amjad Khan as Carlos
- Iftekhar as Colonel (Diana's Father)
- Gajanan Jagirdar as Police Commissioner
- Shreeram Lagoo as Church Priest
- Shammi as Daisy's Friend
- Rajni Sharma as Martha (Carlos’ Sister)
- Suresh Chatwal as Advocate Sinha's Junior Lawyer

== Production ==
The film is based on Strange Case of Dr Jekyll and Mr Hyde, a novella written by the Scottish author Robert Louis Stevenson. Sanjeev Kumar played the characters based on Jekyll and Hyde. His makeup was done by Shashikant Mhatre.

== Music ==
Sahir Ludhianvi wrote the songs while N. Datta composed music of the film.

Song	Singer
"Aaj Socha Hai Khayalon Mein Bulakar Tumko"	Mohammed Rafi, Sulakshana Pandit
"Tumse Kehna Hai Ki Dushwar"	Sulakshana Pandit
"Main Hoon Pari Adaonbhari"	Asha Bhosle
"Jaam Le Jaam, Pakad Jaam"	Asha Bhosle
"Yeh Raat Nek Raat Hai"	Manna Dey
"Aa Kuch Kare Aise"	Dilraj Kaur

== Reception ==
The film failed at the box office.
