= Tera Naam Mera Naam =

- Directed by: Ramesh Talwar
- Starring: Suparna Anand; Tanvi Azmi; Shafi Inamdar; Deepak Tijori; Ajit Pal; Karan Shah
- Release date: 1 January 1988 (India)
- Language: Hindi

Tera Naam Mera Naam is a 1988 Hindi language romance comedy film directed by Ramesh Talwar. Karan Shah plays the role of a scheduled caste boy who loves a girl belonging to a higher class. He exchanges his identity with another boy belonging to a higher caste.

In his book Eena Meena Deeka: The Story of Hindi Film Comedy, film critic Sanjit Narwekar described it as a "new wave twist to an age old mainstream situation."
