= Dharmputra =

1961 Indian film directed by Yash Chopra

- Directed by: Yash Chopra
- Written by: B.R. Films Story Department (screenplay); Akhtar-Ul-Iman (dialogue)
- Based on: Dharamputra by Acharya Chatursen
- Produced by: B.R. Chopra
- Starring: Mala Sinha; Shashi Kapoor; Rehman
- Cinematography: Dharam Chopra
- Edited by: Pran Mehra
- Music by: N. Dutta; Sahir Ludhianvi (lyrics)
- Production company: B.R. Films
- Release date: 1961
- Country: India
- Language: Hindi

Dharmputra is a 1961 Hindi film directed by Yash Chopra based on a novel of the same name by Acharya Chatursen. This is Yash's second directorial venture. It was the first Hindi film to depict the partition of India, and Hindu fundamentalism. Produced by his elder brother B.R. Chopra, who was himself uprooted from Lahore, during the partition of India and established B.R. Films in Mumbai in 1956. The film dealt with issues of religious bigotry, fanaticism and communalism amidst the backdrop of the partition. Two years earlier, Yash Chopra had made his debut with Dhool Ka Phool (1959), steeped in Nehruvian secularism, wherein a Muslim brings up an "illegitimate" Hindu child and featured the classic song "Tu Hindu Banega Na Musalman Banega, Insaan Ki Aulaad Hai, Insaan Banega". The theme was reversed in this film as herein a Hindu family brings up an illegitimate Muslim child.

This was Shashi Kapoor's first film as an adult actor playing the pivotal role of a Hindu fundamentalist. Noted actor Rajendra Kumar made an uncredited special appearance for a song as did Shashikala. Besides, noted actor Dilip Kumar provided an uncredited background narration in this film. At the 9th National Film Awards it was awarded the Best Feature Film in Hindi.

== Plot ==
The film opens in 1925, during the British rule in India and at the height of the Indian independence movement it is the tale of two Delhi families, that of Nawab Badruddin and Gulshan Rai. The two families are so close that they virtually share the same house. The Nawab's daughter, Husn Bano, has an affair with a young man named Javed and gets pregnant. When the Nawab attempts to arrange her marriage with Javed, he finds that Javed has disappeared. Amrit Rai and his wife Savitri assist Husn with the birth of a baby boy, Dilip, and even adopt him and give him their family name. Young Dilip is the apple of the Badruddin and the Rai households. Husn is then reunited and marries Javed. In the meantime, while participating in a protest to force the British to leave India, the Nawab is killed. Years later, Husn Bano and Javed return to a warm welcome by the Rai family. Then she meets Dilip - not the Dilip she had left behind - this Dilip is fascist, a Muslim-hater, who has joined forces with other extremists, in order to force Muslims to leave India and even go to the extent of burning buildings and killing them. How can Husn and Dilip adapt to each other with so much hate and distrust between them?

== Cast ==
- Shashi Kapoor as Dilip Rai
- Mala Sinha as Husn Bano
- Rehman as Javed
- Manmohan Krishna as Dr. Amrit Rai
- Indrani Mukherjee as Meena
- Tabassum as Rekha Rai
- Deven Verma as Sudesh Rai
- Nirupa Roy as Mrs. Savitri Amrit Rai
- Leela Chitnis as Meena's Mother
- Ashok Kumar as Nawab Badruddin (Husn Bano's Father) (uncredited)
- Rajendra Kumar as Party Leader in the song "Yeh Kiska Lahu Hai, Kaun Mara" (uncredited)
- Shashikala as Dancer in the song "Jo Yeh Dil Deewana Machal Gaya" (uncredited)
- Dilip Kumar as the background narrator (uncredited)

== Soundtrack ==
The film's music was composed by N. Dutta.

Song	Singer	Lyricist
"Saare Jahan Se Achcha Hindustan Hamara"	Asha Bhosle, Mohammed Rafi	Allama Muhammad Iqbal
"Main Jab Bhi Akeli Hoti Hoon"	Asha Bhosle	Sahir Ludhianvi
"Naina Kyon Bhar Aaye"	Asha Bhosle	Sahir Ludhianvi
"Saare Jahan Se Achha Hindustan Hamara"	Asha Bhosle, Mohammed Rafi	Sahir Ludhianvi
"Jo Yeh Dil Deewana Machal Gaya"	Mohammed Rafi	Sahir Ludhianvi
"Jai Janani Jai Bharat Maa"	Mahendra Kapoor	Sahir Ludhianvi
"Yeh Kiska Lahu Hai, Kaun Mara"	Mahendra Kapoor	Sahir Ludhianvi
"Tumhari Aankhen"	Mahendra Kapoor	Sahir Ludhianvi
"Aaj Ki Raat"	Mahendra Kapoor	Sahir Ludhianvi
"Chahe Yeh Maano Chahe Woh Maano"	Mahendra Kapoor, S. Balbir	Sahir Ludhianvi

== Reception ==
The raw reconstruction of partition riots and sloganeering led to riot-like situations at theatres during screening the film, and the film flopped at the box office. After Dharmputra's debacle, few directors ventured into the communal theme in Hindi cinema that took it so bluntly, the next film which dealt with the issue was Garm Hava, by M.S. Sathyu, made in 1973. The film's director Yash Chopra never made a political film again, and stuck to love stories till many decades later, when he touched the theme of religious harmony again with Veer Zaara (2004).

== Awards ==
National Film Awards

- 1961: President's silver medal for Best Feature Film in Hindi

Filmfare Award

- 1963: Best Dialogue: Akhtar ul Iman

== See also ==
- List of Asian historical drama films
