= Sahir Ludhianvi =

Indian poet (1921–1980)

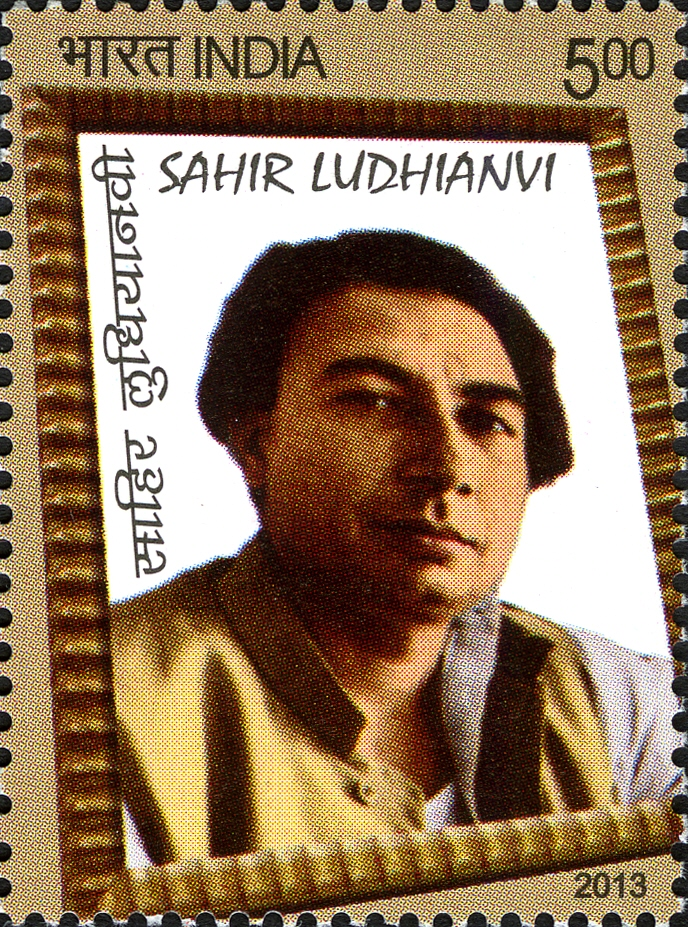
- 2013 stamp featuring Sahir Ludhianvi by India Post
- Born: Abdul Hayee; 8 March 1921; Ludhiana, Punjab, British India
- Died: 25 October 1980 (aged 59); Bombay, Maharashtra, India
- Resting place: Juhu Muslim Cemetery
- Education: S.C.D. Government College, Ludhiana
- Occupations: Poet; Lyricist; Writer
- Partner(s): Sudha Malhotra; Amrita Pritam
- Writing career
- Period: 20th century
- Genre: Poetry
- Subject: Movie Lyrics
- Notable awards: Padma Shri (1971); Filmfare Awards (1964 and 1977); Soviet Land Nehru Award (1973)
- Movement: Progressive Writers' Association

Abdul Hayee (8 March 1921 – 25 October 1980), popularly known by his pen name (takhallus) Sahir Ludhianvi, was an Indian poet who wrote primarily in Urdu in addition to Hindi. He is regarded as one of the greatest film lyricists and poets of 20th century India.

His work influenced Indian cinema, in particular Hindi language films. Sahir won a Filmfare Award for Best Lyricist for Taj Mahal (1963). He won a second Filmfare Award for Best Lyricist for his work in Kabhie Kabhie (1976). He was awarded the Padma Shri in 1971.

On 8 March 2013, the ninety-second anniversary of Sahir's birth, a commemorative stamp was issued in his honour by India Post.

== Early life and education ==
Sahir was born on 8 March 1921, in a Punjabi -speaking Gujjar family in Karimpura, Ludhiana, Punjab, British India. This is the reason why he added the suffix Ludhianvi after his name. His mother, Sardar Begum, left her husband, thus forfeiting any claim to financial assets from the marriage. In 1934, Sahir's father remarried and sued (acrimoniously and unsuccessfully) for custody of his son. In a recent biography titled Sahir: A Literary Portrait (Oxford University Press) written by US-based author Surinder Deol, the author agrees with the brief conclusion of Pakistani poet Ahmad Rahi, a friend of Sahir over the years, about Sahir's life story in a nutshell, "In his entire life, Sahir loved once, and he nurtured one hate. He loved his mother, and he hated his father." Sardar Begum required protection from Sahir's father and suffered financial deprivation. Sahir's place of birth in Ludhiana is marked with a small plaque on the building's arched entrance.

Sahir was educated at the Khalsa High School in Ludhiana. He then enrolled at the Government College, Ludhiana. The auditorium there is named after him. As a college student, Sahir was popular for his ghazals and nazms (poetry in Urdu) and impassioned speeches.

== Career ==
In 1943, Sahir settled in Lahore. There, he completed Talkhiyaan (Bitterness) (1945), his first published work in Urdu. He was member of All India Students Federation. Sahir edited Urdu magazines such as Adab-e-Lateef, Shahkaar, Prithlari, and Savera and became a member of the Progressive Writers' Association. However, when he made controversial statements promoting Communism, a warrant for his arrest was issued by the Government of Pakistan. In 1949, after partition, Sahir fled from Lahore to Delhi. After eight weeks, Sahir moved to Bombay. He later lived in Andheri, a suburb of Mumbai. There, his neighbours included Gulzar, a poet and lyricist and Krishan Chander, an Urdu litterateur.

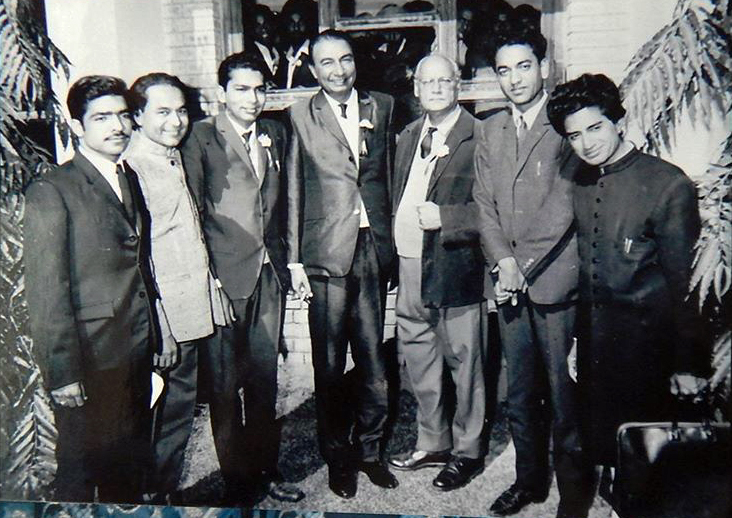
Sahir Ludhianvi, with poets and artists of Punjab, including Shiv Kumar Batalvi, Ludhiana, 1970

Sahir was a member of IPTA and also the Progressive Writer's Association.

Sahir's work as a lyricist in the film industry gave him financial stability beyond his earnings as a poet. He made his debut with four songs in the film Azadi Ki Raah Par (1949). One of the songs was Badal Rahi Hai Zindagi. The film and its songs went unnoticed. However, after Naujawan (1951), with music by S.D. Burman, Sahir gained recognition. Sahir's major success was Baazi (1951) with composer Burman. Sahir was then considered part of Guru Dutt's team. The last film Sahir made with Burman was Pyaasa (1957). After this film, Sahir and Burman went their separate ways due to artistic and contractual differences.

Sahir worked with other composers including Ravi, Roshan, Khayyam and Datta Naik. Datta Naik also credited as N. Datta, a Goan, admired Sahir's poetry and their collaboration produced the score for Milap (1955), Chandrakanta (1956), Sadhna (1958), Dhool Ka Phool (1959), Dharamputra (1961) and Naya Raasta (1970). Sahir also worked with music director Laxmikant–Pyarelal in the films like Izzat (1968), Man Ki Aankhen (1970), Dastaan (1972) and Daag (1973). From about 1950 until his death, Sahir collaborated with Baldev Raj Chopra, a film producer and director. Sahir's last work for Chopra was for Insaaf Ka Tarazu (1980). Yash Chopra, both while directing for B R Films, and later as an independent director and producer, also engaged Sahir as the lyricist for his films, till Sahir's death.

In 1958, Sahir wrote the lyrics for Ramesh Saigal's film Phir Subah Hogi, based on Fyodor Dostoevsky's novel Crime and Punishment. The male lead was played by Raj Kapoor. Shankar–Jaikishan would be composing music for the film but Sahir demanded a composer with a more intimate knowledge of the novel. Consequently, Khayyam composed the film score. The song Woh Subah Kabhi Toh Aayegi with its minimal background music remains popular. Khayyam collaborated with Sahir in many films including Kabhie Kabhie (1976) and Trishul (1978).

Sahir was a controversial figure in that he was artistically temperamental. He insisted that the film score should be composed for his lyrics and not the other way around. He also insisted on being paid one rupee more than Lata Mangeshkar and this created a rift between them. Sahir promoted his girlfriend, Sudha Malhotra's singing career. He also insisted that All India Radio credit film song lyricists in its broadcasts.

== Personal life ==
Sahir was romantically involved with Amrita Pritam and later Sudha Malhotra. Sahir and Pritam's love story was to be the subject of a 2014 movie that was legally objected to by the latter's grandson.

== Death ==
On 25 October 1980, at the young age of fifty-nine, Sahir died of a sudden cardiac arrest. He was buried at the Juhu Muslim cemetery. In 2010, his tomb was demolished to make room for new interments.

== Filmography ==
Year	Film	Music Director	Notes
1948	Azadi Ki Raah Par alias Swatantrata Ke Path Par	G. D. Kapoor	Debut film
1951	Baazi	Sachin Dev Burman	
1951	Ek Nazar	Sachin Dev Burman	
1951	Naujawan	Sachin Dev Burman	
1951	Sazaa	Sachin Dev Burman	Uncredited
1952	Doraha	Anil Krishna Biswas	
1952	Jaal	Sachin Dev Burman	
1952	Lal Kunwar	Sachin Dev Burman	
1953	Alif Laila	Shyam Sundar Gaba	
1953	Arman	Sachin Dev Burman	
1953	Babla	Sachin Dev Burman	
1953	Jeevan Jyoti	Sachin Dev Burman	
1953	Humsafar	Ali Akbar Khan	
1953	Shahenshah	Sachin Dev Burman	
1953	Shole	Dhaniram	
1954	Angaray	Sachin Dev Burman	
1954	Radha Krishna	Sachin Dev Burman	
1954	Savdhan	Vasant Pawar & Ramchandra Vadhavkar	
1954	Taxi Driver	Sachin Dev Burman	
1955	Chingari	Manohar Lal Sonik	
1955	Devdas	Sachin Dev Burman	
1955	House No. 44	Sachin Dev Burman	
1955	Joru Ka Bhai	Jaidev Verma	
1955	Marine Drive	Dattaram Baburao Naik	
1955	Milap	Dattaram Baburao Naik	
1955	Munimji	Sachin Dev Burman	
1955	Railway Platform	Madan Mohan Kohli	
1955	Society	Sachin Dev Burman	
1956	Chandrakanta	Dattaram Baburao Naik	
1956	Funtoosh	Sachin Dev Burman	
1957	Bade Sarkar	Omkar Prasad Nayyar	
1957	Naya Daur	Omkar Prasad Nayyar	
1957	Pyaasa	Sachin Dev Burman	
1957	Tumsa Nahin Dekha	Omkar Prasad Nayyar	Uncredited
1958	12 O'lock	Omkar Prasad Nayyar	
1958	Light House	Dattaram Baburao Naik	
1958	Phir Subha Hogi	Mohammed Zahur Khayyam Hashmi	
1958	Sadhna	Dattaram Baburao Naik	
1958	Sone Ki Chidiya	Omkar Prasad Nayyar	
1959	Bhai Bahen	Dattaram Baburao Naik	
1959	Char Dil Char Rahen	Anil Krishna Biswas	
1959	Dhool Ka Phool	Dattaram Baburao Naik	
1959	Didi	Dattaram Baburao Naik and Sudha Malhotra (separately)	
1959	Lal Nishan	Shiv Dayal Batish (credited as Nirmal Kumar)	
1959	Naach Ghar	Dattaram Baburao Naik	
1960	Babar	Roshan Lal Nagrath	
1960	Barsat Ki Rat	Roshan Lal Nagrath	
1960	Girl Friend	Hemant Kumar	
1960	Hum Hindustani	Usha Khanna	
1960	Masoom	Robin Banerjee	
1961	Dharmputra	Dattaram Baburao Naik	
1961	Hum Dono	Jaidev Verma	
1962	Dilli Ka Dada	Dattaram Baburao Naik	
1962	Kala Samunder	Dattaram Baburao Naik	
1962	Sachche Moti	Dattaram Baburao Naik	Re-released as Rajoo (1967)
1963	Aaj Aur Kal	Ravi Shankar Sharma	
1963	Bahurani	Ramchandra Narhar Chitalkar	
1963	Dil Hi Toh Hai	Roshan Lal Nagrath	
1963	Gumrah	Ravi Shankar Sharma	
1963	Mujhe Jeene Do	Jaidev Verma	
1963	Pyar Ka Bandhan	Ravi Shankar Sharma	
1963	Taj Mahal	Roshan Lal Nagrath	
1964	Chandi Ki Deewar	Dattaram Baburao Naik	
1964	Chitralekha	Roshan Lal Nagrath	
1964	Dooj Ka Chand	Roshan Lal Nagrath	
1964	Gazal	Madan Mohan Kohli	
1964	Shagoon	Mohammed Zahur Khayyam Hashmi	
1965	Bahu Beti	Ravi Shankar Sharma	
1965	Kaajal	Ravi Shankar Sharma	
1965	Waqt	Ravi Shankar Sharma	
1967	Bahu Begum	Roshan Lal Nagrath	
1967	Hamraaz	Ravi Shankar Sharma	
1968	Ankhen	Ravi Shankar Sharma	
1968	Do Kaliyan	Ravi Shankar Sharma	
1968	Izzat	Laxmikant-Pyarelal	
1968	Neel Kamal	Ravi Shankar Sharma	
1968	Vaasna	Chitragupta Srivastava	
1969	Aadmi Aur Insaan	Ravi Shankar Sharma	
1969	Nannha Farishta	Kalyanji-Anandji	
1969	Paisa Ya Pyar	Ravi Shankar Sharma	
1970	Man Ki Aankhen	Laxmikant-Pyarelal	
1970	Naya Raasta	Dattaram Baburao Naik	
1970	Samaj Ko Badal Dalo	Ravi Shankar Sharma	
1971	Chingari	Ravi Shankar Sharma	
1971	Ganga Tera Pani Amrit	Ravi Shankar Sharma	
1971	Sansar	Chitragupta Srivastava	
1972	Bhai Ho Toh Aisa	Sonik-Omi	
1972	Dastaan	Laxmikant-Pyarelal	
1973	Aa Gale Lag Jaa	Laxmikant-Pyarelal	
1973	Daag : A Poem Of Love	Laxmikant-Pyarelal	
1973	Dhund	Ravi Shankar Sharma	
1973	Joshila	Rahul Dev Burman	
1973	Mehmaan	Ravi Shankar Sharma	
1974	36 Ghante	Sapan Chakravarty	
1975	Deewar	Rahul Dev Burman	
1975	Ek Mahal Ho Sapno Ka	Ravi Shankar Sharma	
1975	Jagriti	Laxmikant–Pyarelal	
1975	Zameer	Sapan Chakravarty	
1976	Kabhi Kabhie	Mohammed Zahur Khayyam Hashmi	
1976	Laila Majnu	Jaidev Verma and Madan Mohan Kohli (separately)	
1976	Shankar Shambhu	Kalyanji-Anandji	
1977	Amaanat	Ravi Shankar Sharma	
1978	Nawab Sahib	C. Arjun	
1978	Trishul	Mohammed Zahur Khayyam Hashmi	
1979	Hum Tere Aashiq Hain	Ravindra Jain	
1979	Kaala Patthar	Rajesh Roshan	
1980	Chambal Ki Kasam	Mohammed Zahur Khayyam Hashmi	
1980	Insaf Ka Tarazu	Ravindra Jain	
1980	The Burning Train	Rahul Dev Burman	
1981	Chehre Pe Chehra	Dattaram Baburao Naik	
1981	Dhanwan	Hridaynath Mangeshkar	Last film in which all the songs were written by him.
1982	Deedar-e-Yaar	Laxmikant-Pyarelal	
1982	Jeeo Aur Jeene Do	Laxmikant-Pyarelal	
1982	Lakshmi	Usha Khanna	
1983	Film Hi Film	Dattaram Baburao Naik	Footages of 2 of his songs "Kitna Rangeen Hai Ye Chand Sitaron Ka Sama..." sung by Mohammed Rafi and Asha Bhosle and picturised on Guru Dutt and Sadhana Shivdasani alongside "Aadmi Ko Jeena Hai..." sung by Asha Bhosle and picturised on Guru Dutt and Helen, music by N. Datta, both from the shelved film Picnic (1964) was used in this documentary film.

== Books ==
- Mahmood K. T. (2000) Kalām-i Sāḥir Ludhiyānvī. A collection of Ludhiavni's poetry with English translation.
- Abbas K. A. (1958) Shadows Speak: (Parchhaiyan). 29 pages.
- Hassan R. (1977) The Bitter Harvest: Selections from Sahir Ludhiavni's Verse. 169 pages.
- Sucha S. (1989) Sorcery (Sahri): poetry.
- Gaata jaye Banjara (1992). A collection of film lyrics.
- Bitterness: Talkhiyan

== In media ==
The Hindi film, Pyaasa (1957), is said to be inspired by Sahir's unrequited affection for the Hindi novelist and poet, Amrita Pritam and features several famous songs with lyrics written by him. Sahir's life has been chronicled by Sabir Dutt and by Chander Verma and Dr. Salman Abid in "Main Sahir Hoon".

Sahir Ludhianvi: the People's Poet, a book by Akshay Manwani, is the product of interviews and writings about Sahir by his friends such as Yash Chopra, Dev Anand, Javed Akhtar, Khayyam, Sudha Malhotra, Ravi Chopra and Ravi Sharma. The book also analyses Sahir's poetry and lyrics in the context of his personal life.

== Awards and nominations" ==
Year	Film	Song	Result
Filmfare Award for Best Lyricist
1959	Sadhna	"Aurat Ne Janam Diya"	Nominated
1960	Dhool Ka Phool	"Tu Hindu Banega"	Nominated
1964	Tajmahal	"Jo Waada Kiya"	Won
1964	Gumrah	"Chalo Ek Bar Phir Se"	Nominated
1968	Hamraaz	"Neele Gagan Ke Tale"	Nominated
1969	Aankhen	"Milti Hai Zindagi Mein"	Nominated
1977	Kabhi Kabhie	"Kabhi Kabhie Mere Dil Mein"	Won
1977	Kabhi Kabhie	"Main Pal Do Pal Ka Shayar"	Nominated
1980	Dada	"Dil Ke Tukde Tukde Kar Ke"	Nominated

== See also ==
- Hindi film music
- Shakeel Badayuni
- List of Indian poets
