= Naya Raasta =

- Theatrical release poster
- Directed by: Khalid Akhtar
- Produced by: I.A.Nadiadwala
- Starring: Jeetendra; Asha Parekh
- Music by: N. Datta
- Production company: Pushpa Pictures
- Release date: 11 December 1970
- Country: India
- Language: Hindi

Naya Raasta (transl. New Path) is a 1970 Hindi-language drama film, produced by I.A.Nadiadwala on Pushpa Pictures banner and directed by Khalid Akhtar. The film stars Jeetendra, Asha Parekh, and music composed by N. Datta.

== Cast ==
- Jeetendra as Zamindar Chandar Thakur
- Asha Parekh as Shallo
- Balraj Sahni as Bansi
- Sujit Kumar as Ramu
- Farida Jalal as Radha Singh
- Veena as Rukmini
- Lalita Pawar as Tulsi
- Kishan Mehta as Thakur Suraj Pratap Singh

== Soundtrack ==
All lyrics provided by Sahir Ludhianvi & music by N. Datta.

Song	Singer
"Eeshwar Allah Tere Naam"	Mohammed Rafi
"Ponchhkar Ashq Apni"	Mohammed Rafi
"Maine Pee Sharaab"	Mohammed Rafi
"Chunar Mori Kori, Umar Mori Baali, Dheere Rang Daaro"	Mohammed Rafi, Asha Bhosle
"More Saiyan, Padoon Paiyan"	Asha Bhosle
"Jaan Gayi, Main To Jaan Gayi"	Asha Bhosle
"Zulfon Ke Mahakte Saaye Hai"	Asha Bhosle
