= Angarey (1954 film) =

Angaray
- Directed by: Kunj Bihari Lall
- Written by: Romney Dey (story); Manohar Khanna (dialogues); Sahir Ludhianvi (lyrics)
- Produced by: Kunj Bihari Lall
- Starring: Nasir Khan; Nargis; Pran; K. N. Singh
- Cinematography: Faredoon A. Irani; Minoo Billimoria
- Edited by: Shamsuddin Kadri
- Music by: Sachin Dev Burman
- Production company: Akash Chitra
- Release date: 1954
- Country: India
- Language: Hindi

Angaray is a 1954 Bollywood Action film, directed by K. B. Lall, starring Nasir Khan and Nargis in lead roles, supported by Pran, K. N. Singh and Jeevan in prominent roles. Nanda Karnataki, then credited as Baby Nanda appeared as a child artist in this film. The music was composed by S. D. Burman while Sahir Ludhianvi penned the lyrics. Dilip Kumar worked as an uncredited background narrator in this film.

== Cast ==
- Nasir Khan as Raka
- Nargis as Tulsi
- Pran as Fullura
- Jeevan as Howaba
- K. N. Singh as Dozila
- Nanda Karnataki (child artist; credited as Baby Nanda)
- Dilip Kumar as the background narrator (uncredited)

== Music ==
All songs were music by S. D. Burman and penned by Sahir Ludhianvi.

Song	Singer
"Rajdulari Bitiya Ri"	Lata Mangeshkar
"Us Basti Ko Janewale"	Lata Mangeshkar
"Ummeed Ki Jholi Mein"	Lata Mangeshkar
"Unhe Khokar Dukhi Dil Ki"	Lata Mangeshkar
"Pyarbhari Dhadkanon Ke"	Lata Mangeshkar
"Tere Sath Chal Rahe Hai Yeh Zameen, Chand Tare"	Lata Mangeshkar, Talat Mahmood
"Doob Gaye Akash Ke Tare"	Talat Mahmood
"Gori Ke Nainon Mein Nindiyabhari Aaja Ri"	Kishore Kumar, Shamshad Begum
"Roop Ki Rani Aayi"	Shamshad Begum
"Chup Chup Kyun Hai"	Asha Bhosle
