= Gyara Hazar Ladkian =

- Directed by: K. A. Abbas
- Written by: K. A. Abbas; Ali Sardar Jafri
- Produced by: K. A. Abbas; Ali Sardar Jafri
- Starring: Bharat Bhushan; Mala Sinha
- Cinematography: Ramchandra
- Music by: N. Datta
- Production company: M/S Film Friends
- Release date: 1962
- Running time: 152 minutes
- Country: India
- Language: Hindi

Gyara Hazar Ladkian (Eleven Thousand Girls) is a 1962 Indian Hindi-language romantic social drama film directed by K. A. Abbas. The film was co-produced by the poet Ali Sardar Jafri, who also helped co-write the story with Abbas. Produced under the Film Friends banner, it had music by N. Datta. The director of photography was Ramchandra. The cast included Bharat Bhushan, Mala Sinha in lead, with Murad, Nadira.

The story, which is told in flashback, involves a working girl Asha, played by Mala Sinha, who is in court for a murder committed by her younger sister. Bharat Bhushan plays the lawyer and journalist Puran, who takes the case to prove her innocence.

== Plot ==
Asha (Mala Sinha) is in court facing a murder trial. Puran (Bharat Bhushan), a lawyer and journalist, takes the case. The story then goes into flashback, showing Asha working in the rationing office just after the war. She comes from a poor family and is the sole earning member. She also has six younger sisters to take care of. Puran comes from a rich family; his father is Seth Moolchand (Murad), a businessman. However, Puran decides to work for a newspaper, as a reporter. Asha likes Puran's articles exposing corruption and black-marketing, and his articles on working women. She gets interested in meeting the writer. The two meet in her office at her place of work. While leaving, Puran manages to drop his papers and they get jumbled up with the papers on Asha's desk. Her paycheck, which was lying on the desk, is picked up by Puran by mistake along with his own papers. She meets Puran again to get her check back.

Following several meetings, Asha and Puran fall in love, which is disapproved of by Puran's father. Seth Moolchand tries bribing Asha to stay away from Puran, but she refuses. Seth Moolchand has also attempted to get Puran to give up his journalism, but Puran is stubbornly defiant. An annoyed Moolchand then buys the newspaper where Puran works, but this results in Puran setting up his own newspaper. Then, Moolchand has kidnapped Asha's youngest sister and a ransom is demanded. Since Asha does not have the money for the ransom, she goes to Seth Moolchand. In lieu of the money she borrows, she signs a note stating that she's taking the money to leave Puran. This leads to misunderstandings between her and Puran. One of Asha's sisters, Uma, visits a club where she is molested by the owner. She ends up killing the club owner and Asha takes the blame. Puran manages to prove Asha's innocence in court and also clears up the rift created between them by his father.

== Cast ==
- Bharat Bhushan as Puran
- Mala Sinha as Asha
- Nadira as Mohana
- Murad as Moolchand
- Helen as Dancer
- Imtiaz Khan as Puran's friend

== Production And Review ==
Abbas chose Madhavi to play her debut role of the younger sister as he was certain that being a model, she would be able to face the camera confidently, and be the perfect foil for Mala Sinha's histrionics as the older sister. He had her trained for voice modulation and dialogue delivery to prepare her for the role. The film was cited as "dull" and "boring" and termed as a "propaganda picture" in the Mother India magazine review.

== Soundtrack ==
One of the popular songs from the film was "Dil Ki Tamanna Thi Masti Mein", composed by N. Dutta. The lyricists were Majrooh Sultanpuri, Kaifi Azmi and Faiz Ahmed Faiz while the playback were provided by Mohammed Rafi, Asha Bhosle, Lata Mangeshkar and Mahendra Kapoor.

== Songs ==
Song	Singer
"Mere Mehboob Mere Saath Hi"	Mohammed Rafi
"Dil Ki Tamanna Thi" (Solo)	Mohammed Rafi
"Dil Ki Tamanna Thi Masti Mein Manzil Se Bhi Door" (Duet)	Mohammed Rafi, Asha Bhosle
"Gham Gaya To Gham Na Kar"	Asha Bhosle
"Sab Log, Jidhar Woh Hai"	Asha Bhosle
"Pehchano Hum Wahi Hai"	Lata Mangeshkar
"Gyara Hazar Ladkian"	Mahendra Kapoor
