= Doosara Aadmi =

1977 Hindi romantic film by Yash Chopra

Doosra Aadmi
- Poster
- Directed by: Ramesh Talwar
- Screenplay by: Sagar Sarhadi
- Story by: Raju Saigal
- Produced by: Yash Chopra
- Starring: Raakhee; Rishi Kapoor; Neetu Singh; Shashi Kapoor
- Cinematography: Romesh Bhalla
- Edited by: B. Mangeshkar
- Music by: Rajesh Roshan
- Production company: Yash Raj Films
- Distributed by: Yash Raj Films
- Release date: 14 September 1977
- Running time: 136 Minutes
- Country: India
- Language: Hindi

Doosra Aadmi (transl. The Other Man) is a 1977 Hindi-language romantic drama film, produced by Yash Chopra and directed by Ramesh Talwar. The film stars Raakhee, Rishi Kapoor, Neetu Singh and Shashi Kapoor. The film's music is by Rajesh Roshan.

== Plot summary ==
Nisha, accomplished in advertising industry, becomes a recluse after the tragic death of her boyfriend, Shashi Saigal. Years later, Karan Saxena offers her employment with his advertising agency and she accepts. She realizes that Karan, recently married to Timsy, reminds her of Shashi.

== Cast ==
- Rakhee Gulzar - Nisha
- Rishi Kapoor - Karan Saxena aka Kannu
- Neetu Singh - Timsy Saxena
- Shashi Kapoor - Shashi Sehgal
- Deven Verma - Timsi's Uncle
- Parikshat Sahni - Bhisham
- Satyen Kappu - Ram Prasad Saxena (as Satye`ndra Kappu)
- Gita Siddharth - Mrs. Saxena
- Javed Khan Amrohi as Kannu's friend
- Jagdish Raj - Police Inspector
- Vikas Anand - Bank Manager
- Kiran Vairale as Kannu's friend
- Roopesh Kumar as Rupesh
- Lalita Kumari as Kanya Kumari
- Yunus Parvez as constable Naik
- Ramesh Tiwari as Sharma
- Rajan Verma as (Raj Verma) Train master
- Beena Banerjee
- Rajee Singh as Timsy's aunty Shanti
- Sheetal as Mini

== Soundtrack ==
The soundtrack includes the following tracks, composed by Rajesh Roshan, and with lyrics by Majrooh Sultanpuri.

Doosra Aadmi

Soundtrack album by Rajesh Roshan
- Released: 1977 (India)
- Genre: Film soundtrack
- Label: EMI
- Producer: Rajesh Roshan

Rajesh Roshan chronology
Yehi Hai Zindagi (1977)	Doosra Aadmi (1977)	Jay-Vijay (1977)

Song	Singers
"Chal Kahin Door Nikal Jayein"	Kishore Kumar, Mohammed Rafi, Lata Mangeshkar
"Nazron Se Kah Do"	Kishore Kumar, Lata Mangeshkar
"Aao Manayen Jashn-E-Mohabbat"	Kishore Kumar, Lata Mangeshkar
"Ankhon Mein, Kajal Hai"	Kishore Kumar, Lata Mangeshkar
"Jaan Meri Rooth Gayi"	Kishore Kumar, Pamela Chopra
"Angna Ayenge Sanvariya"	Deven Verma, Pamela Chopra, Chorus

== Awards ==
25th Filmfare Awards

Nominated

- Best Actress – Raakhee
- Best Supporting Actress – Raakhee
- Best Comedian – Deven Verma
- Best Story – Raju Saigal
