= Suman Kalyanpur =

Indian singer (1937–2026)

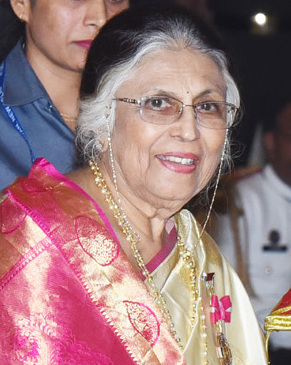
- Suman Kalyanpur in 2023

Background information
- Born: Suman Hemmady; 28 January 1937; Bhavanipur, Kolkata, Bengal Presidency, British India (now in West Bengal, India)
- Died: 31 May 2026 (aged 89) Mumbai, Maharashtra, India
- Genres: Indian classical music, playback singing
- Occupation: Singer
- Years active: 1953–1988

Suman Kalyanpur (born as Suman Hemmady; 28 January 1937 – 31 May 2026) was an Indian playback singer. Known for her three-decade career in Hindi cinema, she was awarded the Padma Bhushan by the Government of India.

Kalyanpur's career started in 1954 and she went onto become a popular singer in the 1960s and 1970s. She also recorded songs for film in several languages besides Hindi, including Bengali, Marathi, Assamese, Gujarati, Kannada, Angika, Bhojpuri, Rajasthani, Odia and Punjabi. Her voice has often been mistaken to be that of Lata Mangeshkar due to their similar tone and texture.

== Background ==
She was born as Suman Hemmady on 28 January 1937 in Kolkata. When she was 3 years old, the family moved to Dhaka, which was then in British India. Her family is native to Hemmadi, a village in Kundapur Taluk of Udupi District, Karnataka. Her father Shankar Rao Hemmady hailed from a Saraswat Brahmin family. He served on a top post in the Central Bank of India and was posted in Dhaka for a very long period. Apart from father and mother Seeta Hemmady, there were 5 daughters and one son in the family with Suman being the eldest among her siblings. In 1943, her family moved to Mumbai, where she received her musical training.

Suman had always been interested in painting and music. After completing schooling from Mumbai’s famed St. Columba High School, she got admission in the prestigious Sir J. J. School of Arts for further studies in painting. Simultaneously, she started learning classical vocal from Pune's Prabhat Films' music director and a close family friend, Pandit Keshav Rao Bhole. According to Suman, initially singing was just hobby to her but gradually her interest in music increased and she started learning it professionally from Ustad Abdul Rehman Khan and Guruji Master Navrang. Suman's younger sister, Shyama Hemmady, was also a singer.

Suman Hemmady married a Mumbai-based businessman Ramanand Kalyanpur in 1958, and thus became Suman Kalyanpur. He accompanied her to every recording session. She had a daughter named Charul Agny, who settled in the United States after marriage. Her granddaughter Aaishanni Agny returned to India and opened an NGO in Mumbai in her grandmother's name.

== Career ==
According to Suman, "Everybody at home had an inclination towards arts and music but public performances were strictly prohibited. Still, I could not say 'no' to an offer to sing for the All India Radio in 1952. This was my first public performance after which I got a chance to sing for the Marathi film Shukrachi Chandni released in the year 1953. At that time, Sheikh Mukhtar was making the film Mangu whose composer was Mohammed Shafi. Sheikh Mukhtar was so impressed with my Shukrachi Chandni songs, that he got me to sing 3 songs for the film Mangu. However, due to some unknown reasons, later O. P. Nayyar replaced Mohammed Shafi and only one of my three songs, a lullaby Koi Pukare Dheere Se Tujhe was retained in the film. Thus, I entered Hindi cinema with the 1954 release Mangu.

Immediately, after the film Mangu, Suman sang 5 songs under the baton of composer Nashad, for the film Darwaza (1954), which was produced by Ismat Chugtai and directed by Shahid Lateef. Since Darwaza released first, it is generally believed to be Suman Kalyanpur's first Hindi film. In the same year (1954), Suman sang the film version of O. P. Nayyar’s hit song Mohabbat Kar Lo Ji Bhar Lo Aji Kisne Roka Hai with Mohammed Rafi and Geeta Dutt for the film Aar Paar. According to Suman, she had a couple of solo lines to sing and her services were used, more, as a chorus singer in this song. This proved to be the only song she ever sang for O. P. Nayyar. The disc does not mention Suman’s name in the credits for this song. Nayyar said that Suman’s parents didn’t want her name to be published on the record for some reason, possibly because when this song was recorded, she was a school going girl.

Suman Kalyanpur's first film song was a duet with Talat Mahmood in Darwaza (1954). Talat Mahmood heard Kalyanpur singing in a musical concert and was highly impressed by her singing. A rank newcomer, her career hit the big league when Talat agreed to sing the duet with her, making the film industry sit up and take notice of her.

She sang for the movie, Mangu (1954), Koi Pukare Dheere Se Tujhe. Kalyanpur provided playback singing for Miyan Bibi Razi (1960), Baat Ek Raat Ki (1962), Dil Ek Mandir (1963), Dil Hi To Hai (1963), Shagoon (1964), Jahan Ara (1964), Sanjh Aur Savera (1964), Noor Jehan (1967), Saathi (1968) and Pakeezah (1971). She sang for composers Shankar Jaikishan, Roshan, Madan Mohan Kohli, S. D. Burman, N Datta, Hemant Kumar, Chitragupta, Naushad, Nashad, S. N. Tripathi, Ghulam Mohammed, Kalyanji Anandji, Vasant Desai, Ravi, Laxmikant–Pyarelal, Bulo C Rani and Usha Khanna singing the most songs for the first two in the list. She has sung a total of 857 Hindi songs.

After Suman's first song in Marathi film Shukrachi Chandni (1953), her next Marathi song was Bhaatuklichaa Khel Maandila for Vasant Pawar, for the film Pasant Aahe Mulgi (1956). Putra Vhawa Aisaa, Ekti, Manini and Annapoorna were but a few of her other films.

Kalyanpur sang with Lata Mangeshkar the duet Kabhi Aaj, Kabhi Kal, Kabhi Parson under the direction of composer Hemant Kumar. She recorded some popular duets with male singers Kishore Kumar, Mohammed Rafi, Manna Dey, Mukesh, Talat Mahmood, and Hemant Kumar. Some of her memorable duets with Rafi are Aajkal Tere Mere Pyaar Ke Charche, Na Na Karte Pyaar, Tumse O Hasina, Rahen Na Rahen Hum, Parbaton Ke Pedon Par Shaam Ka Basera He, Aj Huna Aye Balama, Tumne Pukara Aur Hum Chale Aye, Baad Muddat Ke Yeh Ghadi Ayee, Mujhe Yeh Bhool Na, Dil Ne Phir Yaad Kiya, Tujhko Dilbari Ki Kasam and Chand Takta Hai Idhar. With Manna Dey, she sang the popular duet Na Jaane Kahan Hum The under the music direction of Dattaram. With Mukesh she has sung many popular duets like Yeh Kisne Geet Chheda, Akhiyon Ka Noor Hai Tu, Mera Pyar Bhi Tu Hai, Dil Ne Phir Yaad Kiya, Shama Se Koi Kehde, etc.

Kalyanpur also recorded some memorable songs with a classical base, including Manamohan Man Mein Ho Tumhi, Mere Sang Ga Gunguna and Gir Gayi Re More Mathe Ki Bindiya.

=== Similarity of voice with Lata Mangeshkar ===
Suman Kalyanpur's voice was very similar to the singer, Lata Mangeshkar. Many of her songs are indistinguishable from Lata's style, because she sang with a quality comparable to Lata. Kalyanpur was very uncomfortable regarding the similarity between her voice and Lata's. She had once answered "I was quite influenced by her. In my college days, I used to sing her songs. Meri aawaaz nazuk aur patli thi (My voice was delicate and thin). What could I do? Also when Radio Ceylon relayed the songs, the names were never announced. Even the records sometimes gave the wrong name. Maybe that caused more confusion."

Kalyanpur later commented on the resemblance between their voices, saying, "Perhaps we had gone together to God asking for something, and each of us received half of it. Maybe that's why our voices sound alike—and she arrived first."

During the period when Lata Mangeshkar and Mohammed Rafi stopped recording together over royalty issues, Kalyanpur recorded a large number of duets with Rafi. She sang more duets with him during this period than either before or after the Lata–Rafi dispute. She sang approximately 141 duets with Rafi in total.

According to Lata Mangeshkar's younger sister, singer Usha Mangeshkar, Usha and Suman Kalyanpur were close friends. Usha recalled that she brought Suman to her home and that their first Hindi film songs were recorded for Mangu (1954). She stated, "Suman was my friend (Suman to meri saheli thi), and I brought her home (Main usko ghar leke aai thi). The first Hindi movie song I sang was for Mangu (1954), which was a duet with Suman and was also her first Hindi movie song."

== Discography ==
=== Hindi songs ===
- "Tumse O Haseena Kabhi Mohabbat Na Maine Karni Thi" (Farz)
- "Sathi Mere Sathi" (Veerana)
- "Na Tum Hamen Jano" (Baat Ek Raat Ki)
- "Chhodo, Chhodo Mori Baiyan" (Miya Biwi Razi)
- "Dil Gham Se Jal Raha" (Shama)
- "Yun Hi Dil Ne Chaha Tha" (Dil Hi To Hai)
- "Bujha Diye Hain" (Shagoon)
- "Mere Sang Ga" (Janwar)
- "Mere Mehboob Na Ja" (Noor Mahal)
- "Tum Agar Aa Sako To" and "Zindagi Doob Gai Dard Ke Toofanon Mein" (Ek Sal Pehle)
- "Zindagi Imtihan Leti Hai" (Naseeb)
- "Jo Hum Pe Guzarti Hai" (Mohabbat Isko Kehte Hain)
- "Sharabi Sharabi Yeh Sawan Ka Mausam" (Noor Jehan)
- "Behna Ne Bhai Ki Kalai Se" (Resham Ki Dori), for which she was nominated for the Filmfare Best Female Playback Award in 1975.
- "Dil Ek Mandir Hai" (Dil Ek Mandir)
- "Aajkal Tere Mere Pyaar Ke Charche" (Brahmachari)
- "Aansoo Ki Ek Boond Hoon Main" (Ek Paheli)
- "Mera Pyar Bhi Tu Hai Yeh Bahar Bhi Tu Hai" (Saathi)
- "Na Na Karte Pyar" (Jab Jab Phool Khile)
- "Zindagi Zulm Sahi" (Shagoon)
- "Baharen Luta Ke, Nazare Dikha Ke" (Anarbala)
- "Rahe na Rahe hum" (Mamta)

=== Marathi songs ===
- "Rimjhhim Jharati Shrāwan Dhara"
- "Shabda Shabda Japun Thhewa"
- "Re Kshanichya Sangateene Mi Ashi Bharawale"
- "Keshava Madhava Tuzya Namat Re Godawa"
- "Omkar Pradhan Roop Ganeshache"
- "Jethe Sagara Dharanee Milate"
- "Bhaktichya Phulancha Goad To Suwas"
- "Navika Re Vara Vahe Re"
- "Ketakichya Banee Tethe Nachala Ga Mor"
- "Yaa Laadkya Mulino".
- "Samadhi Gheun jayee dnyandev".
- "Mrudul Karani Chhedit Tara".
- "Savalya Vitthala Tujhya Dari Aale".
- "Saang kadhi kalnar tula bhav majhya manat la"
- "Nimbonichya zada mage"

=== Bengali songs ===
- "Ronger Basore Jodi"
- "Ei ChadroMollikate"
- "Durashar Baluchare"
- "Mone Karo Aami Nei"
- "Sudhu Swapno Niye"
- "Kande Keno Mon"
- "Tomar Aakash Theke"
- "Badoler Madol Baje Guruguru"
- "Aamar Swapno Dekhar Duti Nayon"
- "Aakash Ajana Tobu"
- "Payer Chinho Niye"
- "Dulchere Mon"
- "Byatha Hoye Keno Phire Ele Bondhua"
- "Bhabis Ne Re Kandhchi Bosey"
- "Ekhane Okhane Jekhane Sekhane"
- "Dure Theko Na Aaro Aaro Kache Eso"

=== Kannada songs ===
- "Odanadi Bekendu"
- "Hani Hani Heeri Thani Hareya"
- "Thallana Nooru Bage"

=== Odia songs ===
- "Guhari Suna Bhagabaan" in Samaya (1975)
- "Jaya Jadu Nandan" in Gapa Hele Bi Sata (1976)
- "Muje Janena Kaha Baat Rahichi Chanhi" in Chilika Teerey (1977)

=== Assamese songs ===
- "Oi Oi Akash Xubo"
- "Akashore Neelai Prithivi Xabote"
- "Phool Bhora Phoolonir"
- "Jibon Ghorir Protitu Pol"
- "Milonor Ei Madhu Khyan"
- "O Nayanmoni"

=== Gujarati songs ===
- "Kum Kum Na Pagla Padyan"
- "Nagar Nandji Na Lal"
- "Nayan Ne Nayan Male Jyan"
- "Maniyaro Te Halu Halu"

== Awards ==
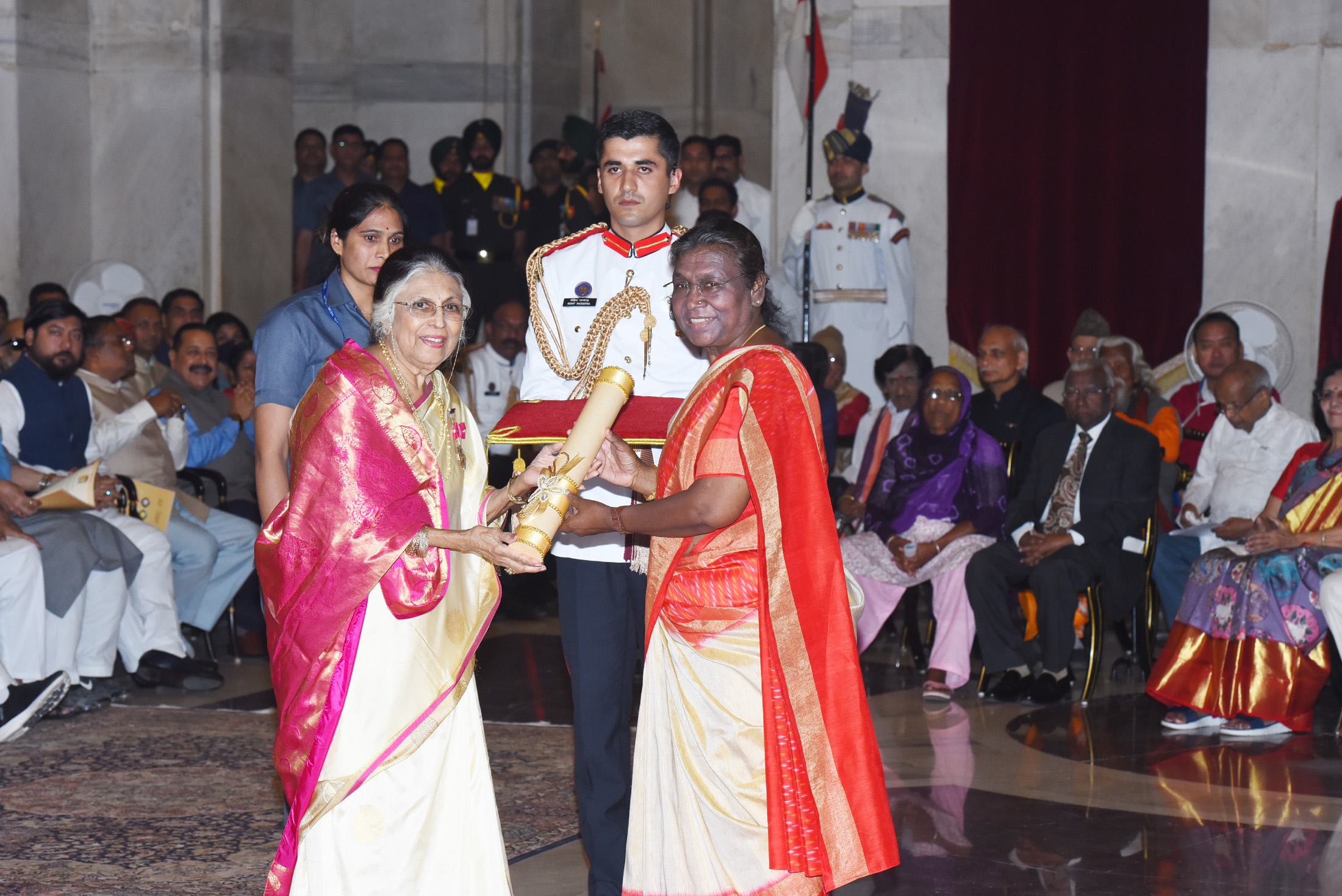
The President, Droupadi Murmu presenting the Padma Bhushan Award to Suman Kalyanpur at the Rashtrapati Bhavan, in New Delhi on March 22, 2023

- 1964, 1967, 1969 – Three Sur Sringar Samsad awards for Best Classical-based Film Song of the Year for “Manmohan Man Mein Ho Tumhi” (Kaise Kahoon), “Ankhiyan Tarsan Lagi” (Boond Jo Ban Gayi Moti) and “Aayi Re Aayi Re” (Sati Sulochana) in the respective years.
- 1970–1973 – Gujarat State Film Award for Best Female Playback Singer by the Government of Gujarat (won consecutively for four years)
- 2009 – Gansamragini Lata Mangeshkar Award (Lata Mangeshkar Award for Lifetime Achievement) by the Government of Maharashtra
- 2015 - Ga Di Ma Award by Ga Di Ma Pratishthan
- 2017 - National Lata Mangeshkar Award by the Government of Madhya Pradesh
- 2022 – Mirchi Music Lifetime Achievement Award
- 2023 – Padma Bhushan by the Government of India on 26 January 2023
- 2024 – Maharashtra Bhushan Ma Ta Sanman Puraskar by Maharashtra Times

== Death ==
Suman Kalyanpur died at her residence in Lokhandwala, on 31 May 2026, at the age of 89.

According to author and close associate Mangala Khadilkar, who wrote 'Suman Sugandh', a Marathi biography of Kalyanpur, Kalyanpur died due to age-related causes. Khadilkar stated that she had spent her final days listening to recordings of her own songs.

== See also ==
- List of Indian playback singers
