= Jagjit Kaur =

Indian singer (1930–2021)

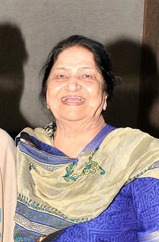
- Kaur in 2016

Background information
- Born: May 1930; British Raj
- Origin: Punjab, India
- Died: 15 August 2021 (aged 91)
- Genres: Folk, ghazals, playback
- Occupation: Singer
- Instrument: Vocals
- Years active: 1950–1990
- Spouse: Mohammed Zahur Khayyam (m. 1954; died 2019)

Jagjit Kaur (May 1930 – 15 August 2021) was an Indian Hindi/Urdu singer. She was married to the music director, Mohammed Zahur Khayyam.

== Personal life and death ==
Kaur belonged to an aristocratic family from Punjab. She married composer Mohammed Zahur Khayyam in 1954, one of the first inter-communal marriages in the Indian film industry. They had a son, Pradeep, who died of a heart attack in 2012. Inspired by their son's helping nature, they started a trust, "Khayyam Jagjit Kaur KPG Charitable Trust" to help artistes and technicians in need. Khayyam died on 19 August 2019 following a cardiac arrest at the age of 92. Kaur died on 15 August 2021 at the age of 91.

== Selected songs ==
Some of her songs are the following:

- "Dekho dekho ji gori sasural chali" from Shagoon (1964), lyrics Sahir Ludhiyanvi, music Khayyam
- "Tum apna ranj–o-gham apni pareshani mujhe de do" from Shagoon
- "Khamosh zindagi ko afsaanaa mil gayaa" from Dil-e-Nadan (1953), lyrics Shakeel Badayuni, music Ghulam Mohammad
- "Chale aao saiyan rangeele main vaari re" (with Pamela Chopra) from Bazaar (1982), lyrics Jagjit Kaur, music Khayyam
- "Dekh lo aaaj humko jee bhar ke" from Bazaar
- "Kaahe ko byahi bides" from Umrao Jaan (1981), music Khayyam
- "Saada chidiya da chamba ve" by Jagjit Kaur and Pamela Chopra from Kabhi Kabhi (1976), music Khayyam
- "Chanda gaaye raagini" from Dil-e-Nadan
- "Pehle to ankh milana" (with Mohammed Rafi) from Shola Aur Shabnam (1961), lyrics Kaifi Azmi, music Khayyam
- "Ladi re ladi tujhse aankh jo ladi" from Shola aur Shabnam (1961)), lyrics Kaifi Azmi, music Khayyam
- "Nain milake pyar jata ke aag laga dee" (with Mohammed Rafi) from Mera Bhai Mera Dushman (1967), music Khayyam

Jagjit Kaur also composed Punjabi Movie music-(Satguru Teri Oat) 1974 Star cast like Dara Singh, Som Dutt
