= List of Hindi films of 1965 =

This list of films produced in 1965 by the Bollywood film industry based in Mumbai includes both notable, and non-notable films.

At the 13th National Film Awards, the award for First, Second and Third Best Feature Film in Hindi went to Shaheed, Oonche Log and Guide respectively.

== Highest-grossing films ==
The highest-grossing films at the Indian box office in 1965:

Rank	Title	Gross collection
1	Waqt	₹6 crore
2	Jab Jab Phool Khile	₹5.5 crore
3	Himalay Ki God Mein	₹4.5 crore
4	Arzoo	₹4 crore
5	Guide	₹3.5 crore
6	Janwar	₹3 crore
7	Khandan	₹2.8 crore
8	Gumnaam	₹2.6 crore
9	Mere Sanam	₹2.5 crore
10	Kaajal	₹2.4 crore

== A-Z ==
Title	Director	Cast	Genre	Notes
Aadhi Raat Ke Baad	Nanabhai Bhatt	Sajjan, Ulhas, Ragini, Murad, Ashok Kumar, Sailesh Kumar		
Aasman Mahal	K. A. Abbas	Prithviraj Kapoor, Dilip Raj, Nana Palsikar	Social drama	
Akashdeep	Phani Majumdar	Dharmendra, Ashok Kumar, Nanda, Mehmood		
Arzoo	Ramanand Sagar	Rajendra Kumar, Sadhana, Nazima, Feroz Khan	Drama	
Bahu Beti	T. Prakash Rao	Joy Mukherjee, Mala Sinha, Ashok Kumar, Mumtaz, Mehmood		
Bedaag	R. Bhattacharya	Manoj Kumar, Nanda		
Bekhabar	Nanabhai Bhatt	Dara Singh, Sayeeda Khan, Master Bhagwan, Madhumati, Shailesh Kumar		
Bharat Katha	Khwaja Ahmad Abbas			
Bharat Milaap	Babubhai Mistri	Anand Kumar, Ashish Kumar, Indrani Mukherjee, Sulochana	Adventure	
Bheegi Raat	Kalidas	Meena Kumari, Ashok Kumar, Pradeep Kumar, Shashikala	Drama	
Bhoot Bungla	Mehmood	Mehmood, Tanuja	Horror, comedy	
Birthday	Phani Majumdar			
Bombay Race Course	Kedar Kapoor	Nalini Jaywant, Johnny Walker, Ajit		
Boxer	Radhakant	Dara Singh, Mumtaz		
Chand Aur Suraj	Dulal Guha	Ashok Kumar, Dharmendra, Tanuja, Nirupa Roy	Drama	
Chhoti Chhoti Baten	Motilal	Motilal, Nadira, Leela Mishra	Family drama	
Dak Ghar	Zul Vellani	Balraj Sahni, Mukri, Sachin	Drama	
Do Dil	Hrishikesh Mukherji	Pran, Biswajit, Rajshree		
Ek Saal Pehle	Dharam Kumar	Sujit Kumar, Sayeeda Khan, Helen, Sunder		
Ek Sapera Ek Lutera	Naresh Kumar	Feroz Khan Kum Kum		
Faisla	Jugal Kishore	Sheikh Mukhtar as fazlu, Jugal Kishore as Moti, Helen, Jeevan, Jagdeep		
Faraar	Pinaki Mukherji	Balraj Sahni, Anil Chatterjee, Shabnam, Helen, Asit Sen	Mystery, thriller	
Fear	Ritvik Ghatak	Shubash Ghai, Sudha Rani		
A Great Day	Adoor Gopalakrishnan		Drama	
Guide	Vijay Anand	Dev Anand, Waheeda Rehman	Drama, romance, musical, social	
Gumnaam	Raja Nawathe	Pran, Helen, Manoj Kumar, Nanda, Mehmood	Thriller/musical	
Himalay Ki God Mein	Vijay Bhatt	Manoj Kumar, Mala Sinha	Drama	
Hum Diwane	Bhagwan	Bhagwan, Helen, Mumtaz, Chandrashekhar		
Hum Sab Ustad Hain	Maruti	Kishore Kumar, Ameeta, Sheikh Mukhtar	Drama	
Janwar	Bhappi Sonie	Shammi Kapoor, Rajshree, Rajendra Nath	Musical	
Jab Jab Phool Khile	Suraj Prakash	Nanda, Shashi Kapoor, Agha	Musical	
Jadui Angoothi	A. M. Khan	Manher Desai, Chitra	Fantasy	
Jahan Sati Wahan Bhagwan	Satish Kumar	Prithviraj Kapoor, Mahipal Anitha Gua	Adventure	
Janam Janam Ke Saathi	Nand Kishore	Premnath, Kamini Kaushal, Lalita Pawar		
Johar-Mehmood in Goa	I. S. Johar	I. S. Johar, Mehmood, Simi Garewal, Sonia Sahni	Comedy	
Kaajal	Ram Maheshwari	Dharmendra, Meena Kumari, Padmini, Raaj Kumar	Social	
Khakaan	Aspi Irani	Dara Singh, Mumtaz, Ratnamala, Prithviraj Kapoor		
Khandan	Bhim Singh	Sunil Dutt, Nutan, Pran, Sudesh Kumar	Drama	
Lutera	Harbans Singh	Dara Singh, Nishi, Prithviraj Kapoor		
Mahabharat	Babubhai Mistri	Pradeep Kumar, Dara Singh, Padmini	History, religious	
Main Hoon Aladdin	Mohammed Husaain	Ajit, Sayeeda Khan, Madan Puri		
Main Hoon Jadugar	Jugal Kishore	Jairaj, Tun Tun, Tiwari		
Mere Sanam	Amar Kumar	Asha Parekh, Biswajit, Pran	Drama	
Mujrim Kaun Khooni Kaun	Ramnik Vaidya	Jairaj, Indira Billi, Sapru, Shery Mohan, Shammi, Gopal Sehgal, V, Gopal,Asit Sen, Mirza Musharraf, Sapru, Shery Mohan, Hire Lal, Brahm Bhardwaj, Bela Bose		
Mohabbat Isko Kehte Hain	Akhtar Mirza	Shashi Kapoor, Nanda		
Namaste Ji	Daljit Krishan	Mehmood, Ameeta, I. S. Johar, Manorama		
Naya Kanoon	R.C. Talwar	Bharat Bhushan, Vyjayanthimala, Ashok Kumar	Drama	
Neela Aakash	Rajendra Bhatia	Dharmendra, Mala Sinha	Drama	
Nishan	Aspi Irani	Sanjeev Kumar, Nazima, Sheikh Mukhtar, Shammi		
Noor Mahal	Noshir Engineer	Jagdeep, Madhumati, Lalita Desai		
Oonche Log	Phani Majumdar	Ashok Kumar, Feroz Khan, Raj Kumar, K. R. Vijaya	Drama	
Poonam Ki Raat	Kishore Sahu	Manoj Kumar, Kumud Chugani	Thriller	
Purnima	Narendra Suri	Dharmendra, Meena Kumari		
Raaka	Kedar Kapoor	Dara Singh, Mumtaz, K.N. Singh		
Rendezvous	Rajendranath Shukla		Documentary	
Rishte Naate	K. S. Gopal Krishnan	Raaj Kumar, Nutan, Kanhaiyalal	Drama	
Rustom-E-Hind	Kedar Kapoor	Dara Singh, Mumtaz, Laxmi Chhaya		
Saat Samundar Paar	Mohammed Husaain	Dara Singh, Ameeta, Ulhas		
Saheli	Arjun Hingorani	Pradeep Kumar, Vijaya Chowdhary, Tun Tun		
Sangram	Babubhai Mistri	Dara Singh, Aruna Irani, Randhawa		
Sati Nari	Pankaj	Anita Guha, Sunder, Jeevan		
Shaheed	S. Ram Sharma	Manoj Kumar, Nirupa Roy, Pran, Prem Chopra, Kamini Kaushal	Revolutionary patriotic	
Shakespeare Wallah	James Ivory	Shashi Kapoor, Felicity Kendal, George Kendal	Drama	
Shankar Seeta Anusuya	Manibhai Vyas	Mahipal, Anitha Guha, Nirupa Roy, Sulochana	Drama	
Sher Dil	Chand	Dara Singh, Parveen Chaudhary, Bhagwan		
Shree Ram Bharat Milap	Manibhai Vyas	Prithviraj Kapoor, Vanmala, Raaj Kumar, Nirupa Roy		
Shreeman Funtoosh	Shantilal Soni	Kumkum, Kishore Kumar		
Sikandar E Azam	Kedar Kapoor	Dara Singh, Mumtaz, Prithviraj Kapoor, Premnath		
Sindbad Alibaba and Aladdin	P.N. Arora	Pradeep Kumar, Sayeeda Khan, Helen, Bhagwan	Action	
Tarzan and King Kong	A. Shamsheer	Dara Singh, Mumtaz, Bhagwan		
Teen Devian	Amarjeet	Dev Anand, Nanda, Kalpana, Simi Garewal	Romance, drama, musical	
Teen Sardar	Radhakant	Randhawa, Parveen Chaudhary		
Teesra Kaun	Mohammed Hussain	Feroz Khan, Shashikala, Kalpana, Rajan Haksar, Pran		
Waqt	Yash Chopra	Sunil Dutt, Sadhana, Raaj Kumar, Shashi Kapoor, Sharmila Tagore, Balraj Sahni, Achala Sachdev	Drama	
Zindagi Aur Maut	N.A.Ansari	Pradeep Kumar, Bela Bose, Faryal		
