= 13th Filmfare Awards =

1966 awards for Hindi cinema

- Date: 7 May 1966
- Site: Bombay

Highlights
- Best Film: Himalaya Ki God Mein
- Best Actor: Sunil Dutt for Khandan
- Best Actress: Meena Kumari for Kaajal
- Most awards: Waqt (5)
- Most nominations: Himalaya Ki God Mein & Waqt (7)

The 13th Filmfare Awards were held in 1966, honoring the best in Hindi cinema in 1965.

Himalay Ki God Mein and Waqt led the ceremony with 7 nominations each, followed by Kaajal with 6 nominations, Arzoo with 5 nominations and Khandan with 4 nominations.

The ceremony was notable as Meena Kumari set a record for the most wins for Best Actress at Filmfare, winning her 4th award for Kaajal. The record has been matched by a few actresses including Nutan, Madhuri Dixit, Kajol, Vidya Balan and Alia Bhatt. Nutan and her niece Kajol, and Bhatt are the only actresses who broke the record held by Kumari.

Waqt won 5 awards, including Best Director (for Yash Chopra) and Best Supporting Actor (for Raaj Kumar), thus becoming the most-awarded film at the ceremony.

Raaj Kumar received dual nominations for Best Supporting Actor for his performances in Kaajal and Waqt, winning for the former.

== Main awards ==
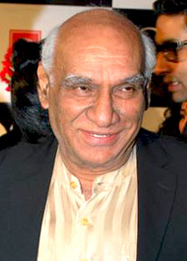
Yash Chopra, Best Director

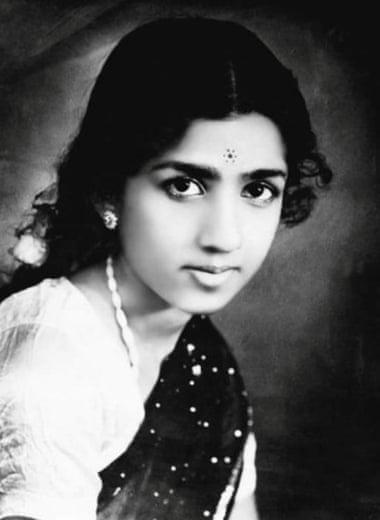
Lata Mangeshkar, Best Playback Singer

Best Film	Best Director
Himalay Ki God Mein – Shri Prakash Pictures – Shankar Bhatt; Haqeeqat – Chetan Anand; Waqt – B. R. Films – Baldev Raj Chopra	Yash Chopra – Waqt; Chetan Anand – Haqeeqat; Ramanand Sagar – Arzoo
Best Actor	Best Actress
Sunil Dutt – Khandan as Govind Shankar Lal; Raaj Kumar – Kaajal as Moti; Rajendra Kumar – Arzoo as Gopal/Sarju	Meena Kumari – Kaajal as Madhavi; Mala Sinha – Himalay Ki God Mein as Phoolwa; Sadhana Shivdasani – Waqt as Meena Mittal
Best Supporting Actor	Best Supporting Actress
Raaj Kumar – Waqt as Raja Chinnoy; Mehmood – Gumnaam as The butler; Raaj Kumar – Kaajal as Moti	Padmini – Kaajal as Bhanu; Helen – Gumnaam as Kitty Kelly; Shashikala – Himalay Ki God Mein as Dr. Neeta Verma
Best Music Director	Best Lyricist
Ravi – Khandan; Kalyanji–Anandji – Himalay Ki God Mein; Shankar–Jaikishan – Arzoo	Rajendra Krishan – "Tumhi Mere Mandir" from Khandan; Hasrat Jaipuri – "Aji Rooth Kar Kahaan" from Arzoo; Indeevar – "Ek Tu Naa Mila" from Himalay Ki God Mein
Best Playback Singer – Male	Best Playback Singer – Female
Award won by a female singer; Mohammed Rafi – "Chhoo Lene Do" from Kaajal	Lata Mangeshkar – "Tumhi Mere Mandir" from Khandan; Lata Mangeshkar – "Ek Tu Naa Mila" from Himalay Ki God Mein
Best Story	Best Dialogue
Akhtar Mirza – Waqt; Ramanand Sagar – Arzoo; Gulshan Nanda – Kaajal	Akhtar-Ul-Iman – Waqt

== Technical Awards ==
Best Art Direction	Best Cinematography
M. S. Sathyu – Haqeeqat (for B/W); S. S. Samel – Gumnaam (for Color)	Ramchandra – Yaadein (for B/W); Dharam Chopra – Waqt (for Color)
Best Editing	Best Sound Design
Pratap Dave – Himalay Ki God Mein	Essa M. Sooratwala – Yaadein

== Superlatives ==
The following films had multiple wins and/or nominations

Movie	Awards	Nominations
Waqt	5	7
Khandan	4	4
Himalay Ki Godmein	2	7
Kaajal	2	6
Yaadein	2	2
Haqeeqat	1	3
Gumnaam	1	3
Arzoo	0	5

== See also ==
- 14th Filmfare Awards
- 15th Filmfare Awards
- Filmfare Awards
