= Waqt (1965 film) =

1965 film by Yash Chopra

- 1965 movie poster
- Directed by: Yash Chopra
- Written by: Akhtar Mirza (story); Akhtar-Ul-Iman (dialogue)
- Produced by: B. R. Chopra
- Starring: Sunil Dutt; Raaj Kumar; Shashi Kapoor; Sadhana; Sharmila Tagore; Balraj Sahni; Achala Sachdev; Rehman; Madan Puri
- Cinematography: Dharam Chopra
- Edited by: Pran Mehra
- Music by: Ravi
- Production company: B. R. Films
- Distributed by: B. R. Films
- Release date: 28 July 1965
- Running time: 179 minutes
- Country: India
- Language: Hindi

Waqt (translation: Time) is a 1965 Indian Hindi-language masala film directed by Yash Chopra, produced by B. R. Chopra and written by Akhtar Mirza and Akhtar-Ul-Iman.

Released in India on 28 July 1965, the film had an ensemble cast of Sunil Dutt, Raaj Kumar, Shashi Kapoor, Sadhana Shivdasani, Sharmila Tagore, Balraj Sahni, Achala Sachdev, Rehman and Madan Puri. It pioneered the concept of Hindi films with ensemble casts.

The plot of the film re-introduced the "lost and found" formula to Hindi cinema, originally featured in the Ashok Kumar & Mumtaz Shanti starrer Kismet (1943). A happy family separated by waqt (time) goes through a series of trials trying to reunite. The film was later remade in Telugu as Bhale Abbayilu (1969) and in Malayalam as Kolilakkam (1981).

== Plot ==
Lala Kedarnath Prasanta (Balraj Sahni) has three sons whose birthdays are on the same day. On the occasion of their birthday celebration, they are visited by a well-known astrologer, who advises Lala Kedarnath not to be proud of his past achievements and not to be too optimistic about the future, as the act of time (waqt) is unpredictable. Lala Kedarnath ignores the prediction and is busy making plans for an even wealthier future. Later that night, as he is proclaiming his grand plans for the future to his wife, Laxmi (Achala Sachdev), there is a sudden earthquake and the whole town crumbles. When Lala Kedarnath regains consciousness, his house has been destroyed and his family is gone.

The oldest son, Raju, ends up in an orphanage, while the middle son, Ravi, is found on the streets by a rich couple who take him to their home to raise him as their own son. The youngest son, Vijay, who is still an infant, is with his mother. Unable to find the rest of the family, Laxmi and Vijay live in poverty. Lala Kedarnath traces Raju to the orphanage, but finds that he has run away because the orphanage manager (Jeevan) beat him. Frustrated, he kills the manager and is jailed. As the police drive away with Lala Kedarnath, the audience sees young Raju running in the streets and turning into an adult (Raaj Kumar).

Raju grows up as Raja, a sophisticated thief, who works for Chinnoy Seth (Rehman). Raja falls in love with Meena (Sadhana Shivdasani) and decides to give up the life of crime. To his dismay, he realises that Meena intends to marry Ravi (Sunil Dutt), who is a family friend. On the night before their engagement, he decides to kill Ravi, only to realise that Ravi is his long-lost brother. Before he can ask Ravi about his parentage, Meena's parents decide to break off the engagement upon discovering that Ravi is of unknown parentage and religion.

Heartbroken, Ravi leaves home after an argument with his foster sister, Renu (Sharmila Tagore), over his objection to her affair with Vijay (Shashi Kapoor), who is working as a chauffeur for Chinnoy Seth. Renu has been in love with Vijay since their college days together, but Vijay has not been able to find a suitable job in Mumbai despite having a BA degree. Laxmi has been diagnosed with stomach cancer. To pay for her medical expenses, Vijay has no other option but to work as a driver.

Raja learns about Ravi's problem and decides to reveal the truth about their relationship at a party organised by Chinnoy Seth. However, Chinnoy Seth's employee Balbir Singh (Madan Puri) drunkenly misbehaves with Meena at the party and Raja manhandles him. Later that night, the drunk Balbir gets into a fight with Chinnoy Seth and in self-defense, Chinnoy Seth ends up stabbing Balbir fatally with his dagger. To cover up his crime, he decides to frame Raja and drags the body to Raja's house, hiding it in his closet. Vijay happens to witness this but is shut up with the promise of money for his mother's treatment.

Raja is arrested and asks Ravi to defend him as an advocate, while Vijay initially testifies falsely and then recants his statement after being confronted. Lala Kedarnath also appears in court as the witness who found Raja being caught by the police. Raja is ultimately proven innocent, and Chinnoy Seth is convicted after he blurts out the truth in court, thanks to Ravi. Afterwards, Laxmi arrives in the court to make sure Vijay did the right thing. Lala Kedarnath sees her in the courtroom and has an emotional reunion with her and Vijay. Raja then overhears Lala Kedarnath narrating his orphanage incident to Laxmi and introduces himself and Ravi as Lala Kedarnath and Laxmi's remaining two sons. The entire family finally reunites. In the end, Lala Kedarnath and the rest of the family build a new home where they, Meena's family, and Renu's family live together.

== Cast ==
- Sunil Dutt as Advocate Ravi Khanna / Bablu Prasanta
- Raaj Kumar as Raja Chinnoy / Raju Prasad
- Shashi Kapoor as Vijay Kumar Prasanta / Munna
- Sadhana as Meena Mittal
- Sharmila Tagore as Renu Khanna
- Balraj Sahni as Lala Kedarnath Prasad
- Achala Sachdev as Laxmi Prasad
- Rehman as Chinnoy Seth
- Madan Puri as Balbir Singh
- Manmohan Krishna as Mr. Mittal (Meena's father)
- Leela Chitnis as Mrs. Mittal (Meena's mother)
- Surendra Nath as Mr. Khanna (Renu's father)
- Sumati Gupte as Mrs. Khanna (Renu's mother)
- Shashikala as Rani Sahiba
- Motilal as Public Prosecutor
- Mubarak as Judge
- Badri Prasad as Pandit Uday Shankar (astrologer)
- Jeevan as Orphanage Manager
- Jagdish Raj as Police Inspector
- Surender Rahi as Lala Kedarnath's jailor
- Hari Shivdasani as Lala Hardayal Rai (Lala Kedarnath's neighbour)
- Erica Lal as special appearance in song "Aage Bhi Jane Na Tu"

== Production ==
Initially, Yash Chopra intended to cast Prithviraj Kapoor in the film, alongside his sons, Raj Kapoor, Shammi Kapoor, and Shashi Kapoor. However, of these, only Shashi ultimately was in the final cast.

== Soundtrack ==
The film's soundtrack was composed by Ravi, with lyrics written by Sahir Ludhianvi. It was the fifth best-selling Hindi film album of the 1960s decade.

- "Waqt Se Din Aur Raat" was listed at #9 on Binaca Geetmala annual list 1965
- "Maine Ek Khwab Sa Dekha Hai" was listed at #31 on Binaca Geetmala annual list 1965

Song	Singer	Raga
"Ae Meri Zohra Jabeen"	Manna Dey	Pilu
"Waqt Se Din Aur Raat"	Mohammed Rafi	Pilu
"Din Hain Bahar Ke Tere Mere Iqrar Ke"	Mahendra Kapoor, Asha Bhosle	Pahadi
"Hum Jab Simatke Aapki Bahon Mein Aa Gaye"	Mahendra Kapoor, Asha Bhosle	Pahadi
"Maine Ek Khwab Sa Dekha Hai"	Mahendra Kapoor, Asha Bhosle	
"Kaun Aaya Kay Nigahon Mein Chamak Jaag Uthi"	Asha Bhosle	Pahadi
"Chehre Pe Khushi Chhaa Jaati Hai"	Asha Bhosle	
"Aage Bhi Jane Na Tu"	Asha Bhosle	Pahadi

== Reception ==
Waqt released to positive reviews from critics and received praise for its production value, story, music and performance of the cast. It took top spot at the box office in 1965, eventually emerging a blockbuster and one of the most successful ventures of B. R. Films. The film is also credited for beginning the now obligatory style of depicting wealth and social class and making the "lost and found" formula popular, in turn, inspiring several popular films, including Yaadon Ki Baaraat (1973) and Amar Akbar Anthony (1977).

This film brought acclaim to Raaj Kumar who turned into a star with this film after many years of doing second leads. Similarly, Yash Chopra proved his capabilities as a director with the huge box office success of Waqt and went on to become one of the greatest Indian filmmakers of all time.

== Awards and nominations ==
This film won 5 awards at the 13th Filmfare Awards

Won

- Best Director – Yash Chopra
- Best Supporting Actor – Raaj Kumar
- Best Story – Akhtar Mirza
- Best Dialogue – Akhtar ul Iman
- Best Cinematography (Color) – Dharam Chopra

Nominated

- Best Film – B. R. Chopra
- Best Actress – Sadhana
