= Filmfare Award for Best Actress =

Award for the best performance by an actress in a leading role

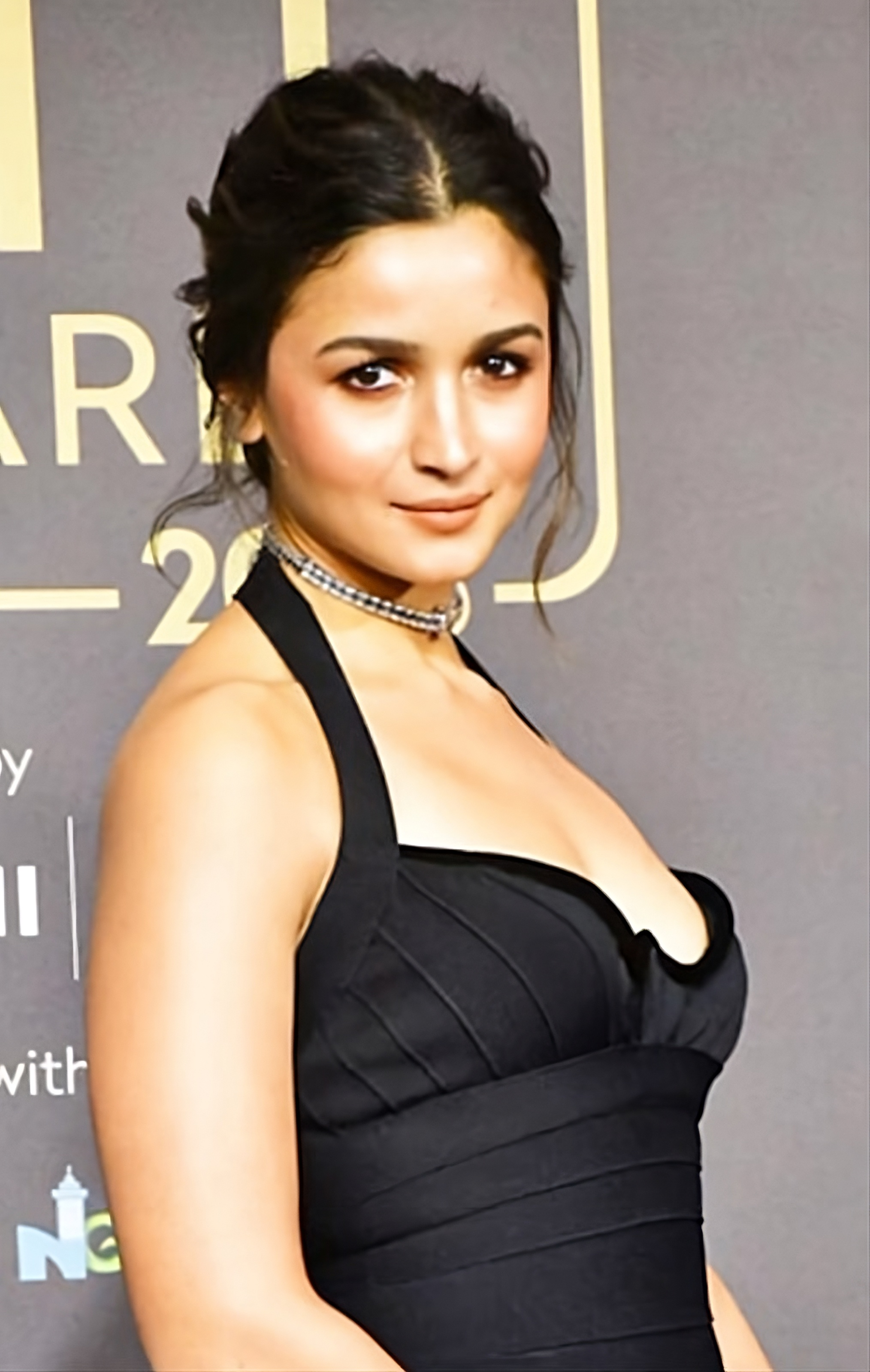
- The 2025 recipient: Alia Bhatt for Jigra
- Awarded for: Best Performance by an Actress in a Leading Role
- Country: India
- Presented by: Filmfare
- First award: Meena Kumari, Baiju Bawra (1954)
- Most recent winner: Alia Bhatt, Jigra (2025)

Highlights
- Most awards: Alia Bhatt (6)
- Most nominations: Madhuri Dixit (14)
- Website: Filmfare Awards

The Filmfare Award for Best Actress is given by Filmfare as part of its annual Filmfare Awards for Hindi films, to recognise the actress who has delivered an outstanding performance in a leading role in a film released that year. The award was first presented in 1954 for the films released in 1953.

== Achievement records ==
=== Multiple wins ===
Individuals with two or more Best Actress awards:

Wins	Actress
6	Alia Bhatt
5	Nutan; Kajol
4	Meena Kumari; Madhuri Dixit; Vidya Balan
3	Vyjayanthimala; Jaya Bachchan; Shabana Azmi
2	Waheeda Rehman; Dimple Kapadia; Rekha; Sridevi; Karisma Kapoor; Aishwarya Rai; Rani Mukerji; Deepika Padukone

=== Multiple nominations ===
Individuals with ten or more Best Actress nominations:

Nominations	Actress
14	Madhuri Dixit
12	Meena Kumari; Vidya Balan
11	Hema Malini; Kajol; Rani Mukerji
10	Aishwarya Rai; Sridevi; Deepika Padukone; Kareena Kapoor

=== Other achievement records ===
Achievement	Actor	Record
Nominations full sweep	Meena Kumari (1963)	3
Most nominations in a single year	Shabana Azmi (1984)	4
Most consecutive wins	Alia Bhatt (2023–2025)	3
Most consecutive nominations	Madhuri Dixit (1989–1996)	10
Most nominations without ever winning	Tabu	8
Eldest winner	Nutan (1979)	age 42
Eldest nominee	Sharmila Tagore (2006)	age 61
Youngest winner	Dimple Kapadia (1973)	age 16
Youngest nominee	Dimple Kapadia (1973)	age 16

- Alia Bhatt holds the record for the most consecutive wins, winning the Best Actress award from 2023–2025. She is followed by Meena Kumari (1954–1955), Jaya Bachchan (1974–1975), Shabana Azmi (1984–1985), Rani Mukerji (2005–2006), and Vidya Balan (2012–2013), each with two consecutive wins. Bhatt also holds the distinction of winning the award consecutively on two separate occasions, having previously won in 2019–2020.
- A tied win occurred in 1974, when Dimple Kapadia won for Bobby and Jaya Bachchan for Abhimaan. Meena Kumari achieved a unique feat in 1963 by being the only nominee that year with all three Best Actress nominations. In the early years of the award, specifically 1954–1955 and 1956–1957, there was only one nominee.
- Vyjayanthimala is the only actress to win all of her nominations without a loss, having won three times (1959, 1962, and 1965). She was also the first actor in history to be nominated for — and win — awards in both the leading and supporting categories, as well as the first person to receive dual nominations in the same year across all categories.
- Madhuri Dixit holds the record for the longest streak of nominations, with 10 nominations in 8 years between 1989 and 1996. Rani Mukerji has the most overall nominations in the primary female acting categories, with 21 in total: 11 for Best Actress, three for Best Actress (Critics), and seven for Best Supporting Actress.
- Actresses who received multiple Best Actress nominations in the same year and won include Shabana Azmi (four nominations in 1984), Meena Kumari (three in 1963), and Kajol (three in 1999). Others with two nominations in the same year include Vyjayanthimala (1959), Jaya Bachchan (1974), Raakhee (1977), Rekha (1981), Azmi (1985), Sridevi (1990), Juhi Chawla (1994), Madhuri Dixit (1995), Aishwarya Rai (2000), Preity Zinta (2004), Rani Mukerji (2005), Vidya Balan (2012), Deepika Padukone (2014 and 2016), and Alia Bhatt (2017).
- Several actresses received multiple nominations in the same year without winning. These include Jaya Bachchan (1972), Hema Malini (1975 and 1976), Madhuri Dixit (1996), and Kareena Kapoor (2010), each with two nominations in their respective years.
- Among actresses who have received multiple nominations without a win are Tabu (8 nominations), and Mala Sinha, Saira Banu, Manisha Koirala, Urmila Matondkar, Anushka Sharma, and Sonam Kapoor with 4 each. Jaya Prada and Parineeti Chopra have received 3 nominations each without a win.
- Nutan was the eldest recipient of the Best Actress award, winning at the age of 42 in 1979 for Main Tulsi Tere Aangan Ki, her fifth win. Sharmila Tagore is the eldest nominee, receiving a nomination at age 61 for Viruddh (2006). Dimple Kapadia is both the youngest nominee and winner, receiving the award at age 16 for Bobby (1973).
- By decade, Meena Kumari led the 1950s with two wins, Nutan the 1960s with three, Jaya Bachchan the 1970s with two, and both Shabana Azmi and Rekha the 1980s with two each. Madhuri Dixit led the 1990s with four wins. Aishwarya Rai, Rani Mukerji, and Kajol each had two wins in the 2000s. Vidya Balan led the 2010s with four wins, and Alia Bhatt leads the 2020s with four wins.
- Tabu has been nominated across four decades, consecutively 1990s (twice), 2000s (thrice), 2010s (once), 2020s (twice).
- In 2002, siblings Karisma Kapoor (Zubeidaa) and Kareena Kapoor (Aśoka) were nominated in the same year. Several actresses have won the Best Female Debut award before winning Best Actress. These include Juhi Chawla (1994), Preity Zinta (2004), Kareena Kapoor (2008), Priyanka Chopra (2009), Vidya Balan (2010), Deepika Padukone (2014), Kangana Ranaut (2015), and Kriti Sanon (2021).
- Actresses who have won both Best Actress and Best Supporting Actress awards include Vyjayanthimala (1958), Raakhee (1976), Padmini Kolhapure (1983), Nutan (1986), Dimple Kapadia (1994), Rekha (1997), Karisma Kapoor (1998), Jaya Bachchan (2001), Madhuri Dixit (2003), Rani Mukerji (2005), Kareena Kapoor (2011), Kangana Ranaut (2015), Priyanka Chopra (2016), and Shabana Azmi (2017). Mukerji is the only actress to win both awards in the same year.
- Some actresses were nominated for both Best Actress and Best Supporting Actress in the same year but did not win either. These include Aishwarya Rai (2001), Rani Mukerji (2008), and Anushka Sharma (2016).
- Winners of both the Popular and Critics' Best Actress awards include Dimple Kapadia (1992), Karisma Kapoor (2002), Rani Mukerji (2006), Kareena Kapoor (2008), Vidya Balan (2011), Priyanka Chopra (2012), Kangana Ranaut (2016), Alia Bhatt (2017), and Taapsee Pannu (2021). Mukerji remains the only actress to win both for the same performance in the same year.
- Three actresses have won all four major female acting awards—Best Actress (Popular), Best Actress (Critics), Best Supporting Actress, and Best Female Debut. These are Kareena Kapoor (2011), Priyanka Chopra (2016) and Kangana Ranaut (2016).
- A few performances have been nominated in both Best Actress and Best Supporting Actress categories. Nutan was nominated in both for Saudagar (1974) and again for Main Tulsi Tere Aangan Ki (1979), winning Best Actress in the latter. Raakhee was nominated in both categories for Doosra Aadmi (1978).
- Actresses nominated more than once for the same character across films in a franchise include Vidya Balan for Kahaani (2013, won) and Kahaani 2: Durga Rani Singh (2017), and Rani Mukerji for Mardaani (2015) and Mardaani 2 (2020).
- Actresses who won the Best Actress award for their debut performances include Dimple Kapadia (Bobby, 1973) and Lakshmi (Julie, 1975).
- In 2022, Kangana Ranaut's nomination for Thalaivii was rescinded after she publicly criticized Filmfare and demanded her nomination be withdrawn, accusing the awards of bias.

== Winners and nominees ==
Table key
‡	Indicates the winner

=== 1950s ===
Year	Photos of winners	Actress	Role(s)	Film	Ref.
1954 (1st)		Meena Kumari ‡	Gauri	Baiju Bawra	
1954 (1st)		No Other Nominee			
1955 (2nd)		Meena Kumari ‡	Lalita	Parineeta	
1955 (2nd)		No Other Nominee			
1956 (3rd)		Kamini Kaushal ‡	Biraj Chakravarty	Biraj Bahu	
1956 (3rd)		Geeta Bali	Kamala	Vachan	
1956 (3rd)		Meena Kumari	Shobha	Azaad	
1957 (4th)		Nutan ‡	Gauri	Seema	
1957 (4th)		No Other Nominee			
1958 (5th)		Nargis ‡	Radha	Mother India	
1958 (5th)		No Other Nominee			
1959 (6th)		Vyjayanthimala ‡	Champabai / Rajani	Sadhna	
1959 (6th)		Meena Kumari	Leela	Sahara	
1959 (6th)		Vyjayanthimala	Madhumati	Madhumati	

=== 1960s ===
Year	Photos of winners	Actress	Role(s)	Film	Ref.
1960 (7th)		Nutan ‡	Sujata	Sujata	
1960 (7th)		Mala Sinha	Meena Khosla	Dhool Ka Phool	
1960 (7th)		Meena Kumari	Ratna	Chirag Kahan Roshni Kahan	
1961 (8th)		Bina Rai ‡	Parvati / Jamuna	Ghunghat	
1961 (8th)		Madhubala	Anarkali	Mughal-e-Azam	
1961 (8th)		Nutan	Shanti	Chhalia	
1962 (9th)		Vyjayanthimala ‡	Dhanno	Gunga Jumna	
1962 (9th)		Padmini	Kammo	Jis Desh Mein Ganga Behti Hai	
1962 (9th)		Saira Banu	Rajkumari "Raj"	Junglee	
1963 (10th)		Meena Kumari ‡	Chhoti Bahu	Sahib Bibi Aur Ghulam	
1963 (10th)		Meena Kumari	Aarti Gupta	Aarti	
1963 (10th)		Meena Kumari	Gayatri Devi	Main Chup Rahungi	
1964 (11th)		Nutan ‡	Kalyani	Bandini	
1964 (11th)		Mala Sinha	Padma	Bahurani	
1964 (11th)		Meena Kumari	Sita	Dil Ek Mandir	
1965 (12th)		Vyjayanthimala ‡	Radha Khanna	Sangam	
1965 (12th)		Mala Sinha	Jahanara Begum Sahib	Jahan Ara	
1965 (12th)		Sadhna	Sandhya	Woh Kaun Thi?	
1966 (13th)		Meena Kumari ‡	Madhavi	Kaajal	
1966 (13th)		Mala Sinha	Phulwa	Himalay Ki God Mein	
1966 (13th)		Sadhana	Meena Mittal	Waqt	
1967 (14th)		Waheeda Rehman ‡	Rosie Marco	Guide	
1967 (14th)		Meena Kumari	Shanti	Phool Aur Patthar	
1967 (14th)		Suchitra Sen	Devyani (Pannabai) / Suparna	Mamta	
1968 (15th)		Nutan ‡	Radha R. Rai	Milan	
1968 (15th)		Saira Banu	Poonam	Shagird	
1968 (15th)		Waheeda Rehman	Anjana	Ram Aur Shyam	
1969 (16th)		Waheeda Rehman ‡	Rajkumari Neel Kamal / Sita Raichand	Neel Kamal	
1969 (16th)		Nargis	Mrs. Varuna Verma / Peggy	Raat Aur Din	
1969 (16th)		Saira Banu	Kamini Gupta	Diwana	

=== 1970s ===
Year	Photos of winners	Actress	Role(s)	Film	Ref.
1970 (17th)		Sharmila Tagore ‡	Vandana Tripathi	Aradhana	
1970 (17th)		Asha Parekh	Asha Chibber	Chirag	
1970 (17th)		Nanda	Rekha	Ittefaq	
1971 (18th)		Mumtaz ‡	Chand	Khilona	
1971 (18th)		Sharmila Tagore	Mrs. Neela Shekhar Kapoor	Safar	
1971 (18th)		Waheeda Rehman	Radha	Khamoshi	
1972 (19th)		Asha Parekh ‡	Madhavi (Madhu)	Kati Patang	
1972 (19th)		Jaya Bachchan	Kusum (Guddi)	Guddi	
1972 (19th)		Jaya Bachchan	Meenu	Uphaar	
1973 (20th)		Hema Malini ‡	Seeta / Geeta	Seeta Aur Geeta	
1973 (20th)		Meena Kumari (posthumous)	Nargis / Sahibjaan	Pakeezah	
1973 (20th)		Raakhee	Parvati	Aankhon Aankhon Mein	
1974 (21st)		Dimple Kapadia ‡	Bobby J. Braganza	Bobby	
1974 (21st)		Jaya Bachchan ‡	Uma Kumar	Abhimaan	
1974 (21st)		Jaya Bachchan	Aarti Mathur	Koshish	
1974 (21st)		Moushumi Chatterjee	Shivani	Anuraag	
1974 (21st)		Nutan	Mahjubhi	Saudagar	
1975 (22nd)		Jaya Bachchan ‡	Archana Gupta	Kora Kagaz	
1975 (22nd)		Hema Malini	Sunita (Soni)	Amir Garib	
1975 (22nd)		Hema Malini	Lata	Prem Nagar	
1975 (22nd)		Saira Banu	Lalita	Sagina	
1975 (22nd)		Shabana Azmi	Laxmi	Ankur	
1976 (23rd)		Lakshmi ‡	Julie	Julie	
1976 (23rd)		Suchitra Sen	Aarti Devi	Aandhi	
1976 (23rd)		Hema Malini	Kusum	Khushboo	
1976 (23rd)		Hema Malini	Champa	Sanyasi	
1976 (23rd)		Jaya Bachchan	Mili Khanna	Mili	
1977 (24th)		Raakhee ‡	Indrani (Indu) Sinha	Tapasya	
1977 (24th)		Hema Malini	Ratna / Jhumri	Mehbooba	
1977 (24th)		Raakhee	Pooja Khanna	Kabhie Kabhie	
1977 (24th)		Reena Roy	Nagin	Nagin	
1977 (24th)		Sharmila Tagore	Chanda Thapa / Kajli Thapa	Mausam	
1978 (25th)		Shabana Azmi ‡	Saudamini "Mini"	Swami	
1978 (25th)		Hema Malini	Aarti Sanyal	Kinara	
1978 (25th)		Raakhee	Nisha	Doosra Aadmi	
1978 (25th)		Smita Patil	Usha (Urvashi) Dalvi	Bhumika	
1978 (25th)		Zarina Wahab	Chhaya	Gharonda	
1979 (26th)		Nutan ‡	Sanjukta Chouhan	Main Tulsi Tere Aangan Ki	
1979 (26th)		Raakhee	Mrs. Aarti Gupta	Trishna	
1979 (26th)		Ranjeeta Kaur	Lily Fernandes	Ankhiyon Ke Jharokhon Se	
1979 (26th)		Rekha	Aarti Chandra	Ghar	
1979 (26th)		Zeenat Aman	Rupa	Satyam Shivam Sundaram	

=== 1980s ===
Year	Photos of winners	Actress	Role(s)	Film	Ref.
1980 (27th)		Jaya Bachchan ‡	Geeta	Nauker	
1980 (27th)		Hema Malini	Meera	Meera	
1980 (27th)		Jaya Prada	Hema Pradhan	Sargam	
1980 (27th)		Poonam Dhillon	Noorie Nabi	Noorie	
1980 (27th)		Raakhee	Rama Sharma	Jurmana	
1981 (28th)		Rekha ‡	Manju Dayal	Khubsoorat	
1981 (28th)		Reena Roy	Asha	Asha	
1981 (28th)		Rekha	Gauri Singh Verma	Judaai	
1981 (28th)		Shabana Azmi	Nima Chaudhary	Thodisi Bewafaii	
1981 (28th)		Zeenat Aman	Bharti Saxena	Insaaf Ka Tarazu	
1982 (29th)		Smita Patil ‡	Amma	Chakra	
1982 (29th)		Hema Malini	Asha	Naseeb	
1982 (29th)		Jaya Bachchan	Shobha Malhotra	Silsila	
1982 (29th)		Raakhee	Sharda Balraj Kohli	Baseraa	
1982 (29th)		Rati Agnihotri	Sapna	Ek Duuje Ke Liye	
1982 (29th)		Rekha	Amiran / Umrao Jaan	Umrao Jaan	
1983 (30th)		Padmini Kolhapure ‡	Manorama "Rama"	Prem Rog	
1983 (30th)		Raakhee	Sheetal Kumar	Shakti	
1983 (30th)		Rekha	Sangeeta Shrivastav	Jeevan Dhaara	
1983 (30th)		Salma Agha	Nilofer Bano / Habiba Shabnam Rehmani	Nikaah	
1983 (30th)		Smita Patil	Najma	Bazaar	
1984 (31st)		Shabana Azmi ‡	Mrs. Pooja Inder Malhotra	Arth	
1984 (31st)		Shabana Azmi	Radha Kishen	Avtaar	
1984 (31st)		Shabana Azmi	Rukmini Bai	Mandi	
1984 (31st)		Shabana Azmi	Indu D. Malhotra	Masoom	
1984 (31st)		Sridevi	Nehalata Sharma	Sadma	
1985 (32nd)		Shabana Azmi ‡	Bhavna Saxena	Bhavna	
1985 (32nd)		Jaya Prada	Meena	Sharaabi	
1985 (32nd)		Rohini Hattangadi	Parvati Pradhan	Saaransh	
1985 (32nd)		Shabana Azmi	Kavita	Sparsh	
1985 (32nd)		Smita Patil	Rajni V. Deshmukh	Aaj Ki Awaaz	
1986 (33rd)		Dimple Kapadia ‡	Mona D'Silva	Saagar	
1986 (33rd)		Jaya Prada	Yashoda / Asha	Sanjog	
1986 (33rd)		Mandakini	Ganga Singh	Ram Teri Ganga Maili	
1986 (33rd)		Padmini Kolhapure	Preeti B. Pratap	Pyaar Jhukta Nahin	
1986 (33rd)		Rati Agnihotri	Sultana	Tawaif	
1987	NO CEREMONY				
1988	NO CEREMONY				
1989 (34th)		Rekha ‡	Aarti Verma / Jyoti	Khoon Bhari Maang	
1989 (34th)		Juhi Chawla	Rashmi	Qayamat Se Qayamat Tak	
1989 (34th)		Madhuri Dixit	Mohini	Tezaab	

=== 1990s ===
Year	Photos of winners	Actress	Role(s)	Film	Ref.
1990 (35th)		Sridevi ‡	Anju Das / Manju Das	ChaalBaaz	
1990 (35th)		Bhagyashree	Suman	Maine Pyaar Kiya	
1990 (35th)		Madhuri Dixit	Lakshmi M. Rao	Prem Pratigyaa	
1990 (35th)		Sridevi	Chandni Mathur	Chandni	
1990 (35th)		Vijayshanti	Lalita	Eeshwar	
1991 (36th)		Madhuri Dixit ‡	Madhu Mehra	Dil	
1991 (36th)		Hema Malini	Taku	Rihaee	
1991 (36th)		Juhi Chawla	Shanti	Pratibandh	
1991 (36th)		Meenakshi Seshadri	Meena S. Verma	Jurm	
1992 (37th)		Sridevi ‡	Pallavi / Pooja Bhatnagar	Lamhe	
1992 (37th)		Dimple Kapadia	Reva	Lekin...	
1992 (37th)		Madhuri Dixit	Pooja Saxena	Saajan	
1992 (37th)		Rekha	Namrata Singh	Phool Bane Angaray	
1992 (37th)		Zeba Bakhtiar	Henna	Henna	
1993 (38th)		Madhuri Dixit ‡	Saraswati	Beta	
1993 (38th)		Juhi Chawla	Radha / Rita	Bol Radha Bol	
1993 (38th)		Sridevi	Benazir / Mehndi	Khuda Gawah	
1994 (39th)		Juhi Chawla ‡	Vaijayanthi Iyer	Hum Hain Rahi Pyar Ke	
1994 (39th)		Dimple Kapadia	Shanichari	Rudaali	
1994 (39th)		Madhuri Dixit	Gangotri "Ganga" Singh	Khalnayak	
1994 (39th)		Meenakshi Seshadri	Damini Gupta	Damini	
1994 (39th)		Sridevi	Roshni Chadha	Gumrah	
1995 (40th)		Madhuri Dixit ‡	Nisha Chaudhary	Hum Aapke Hain Koun..!	
1995 (40th)		Kajol	Sapna Banerjee	Yeh Dillagi	
1995 (40th)		Madhuri Dixit	Shivani Chopra	Anjaam	
1995 (40th)		Manisha Koirala	Rajeshwari "Rajjo" Pathak	1942: A Love Story	
1995 (40th)		Sridevi	Sheetal Jaitley	Laadla	
1996 (41st)		Kajol ‡	Simran Singh	Dilwale Dulhania Le Jayenge	
1996 (41st)		Madhuri Dixit	Madhu Garewal	Raja	
1996 (41st)		Madhuri Dixit	Lalita	Yaarana	
1996 (41st)		Manisha Koirala	Kiran Kumar	Akele Hum Akele Tum	
1996 (41st)		Urmila Matondkar	Mili Joshi	Rangeela	
1997 (42nd)		Karisma Kapoor ‡	Aarti Sehgal	Raja Hindustani	
1997 (42nd)		Juhi Chawla	Priya Bhatia	Daraar	
1997 (42nd)		Manisha Koirala	Annie J. Braganza	Khamoshi: The Musical	
1997 (42nd)		Seema Biswas	Phoolan Devi	Bandit Queen	
1997 (42nd)		Tabu	Virender "Veeru" Kaur	Maachis	
1998 (43rd)		Madhuri Dixit ‡	Pooja	Dil To Pagal Hai	
1998 (43rd)		Juhi Chawla	Seema Kapoor	Yes Boss	
1998 (43rd)		Mahima Chaudhry	Kusum Ganga	Pardes	
1998 (43rd)		Sridevi	Kaajal Verma	Judaai	
1998 (43rd)		Tabu	Gehna	Virasat	
1999 (44th)		Kajol ‡	Anjali Sharma	Kuch Kuch Hota Hai	
1999 (44th)		Kajol	Sonia / Naina Saigal	Dushman	
1999 (44th)		Kajol	Sanjana	Pyaar To Hona Hi Tha	
1999 (44th)		Manisha Koirala	Moina alias Meghna	Dil Se...	
1999 (44th)		Urmila Matondkar	Vidya	Satya	

=== 2000s ===
Year	Photos of winners	Actress	Role(s)	Film	Ref.
2000 (45th)		Aishwarya Rai ‡	Nandini Darbar	Hum Dil De Chuke Sanam	
2000 (45th)		Aishwarya Rai	Mansi Shankar	Taal	
2000 (45th)		Kajol	Megha	Hum Aapke Dil Mein Rehte Hain	
2000 (45th)		Karisma Kapoor	Pooja Mehra	Biwi No.1	
2000 (45th)		Tabu	Panna Barve	Hu Tu Tu	
2001 (46th)		Karisma Kapoor ‡	Fiza Ikramullah	Fiza	
2001 (46th)		Aishwarya Rai	Preeti Vyas	Hamara Dil Aapke Paas Hai	
2001 (46th)		Madhuri Dixit	Anjali	Pukar	
2001 (46th)		Preity Zinta	Priya Bakshi	Kya Kehna	
2001 (46th)		Tabu	Aditi Pandit	Astitva	
2002 (47th)		Kajol ‡	Anjali Sharma Raichand	Kabhi Khushi Kabhie Gham	
2002 (47th)		Ameesha Patel	Sakeena Ali Singh	Gadar: Ek Prem Katha	
2002 (47th)		Kareena Kapoor	Kaurwaki	Asoka	
2002 (47th)		Karisma Kapoor	Zubeidaa	Zubeidaa	
2002 (47th)		Tabu	Mumtaz Ali Ansari	Chandni Bar	
2003 (48th)		Aishwarya Rai ‡	Parvati 'Paro' Chakraborty	Devdas	
2003 (48th)		Ameesha Patel	Priya Singhania	Humraaz	
2003 (48th)		Bipasha Basu	Sanjana Aditya Dhanraj	Raaz	
2003 (48th)		Karisma Kapoor	Nandini	Shakti: The Power	
2003 (48th)		Rani Mukerji	Suhani Sharma	Saathiya	
2004 (49th)		Preity Zinta ‡	Naina Kapur	Kal Ho Naa Ho	
2004 (49th)		Bhumika Chawla	Nirjara Bhardwaj	Tere Naam	
2004 (49th)		Hema Malini	Pooja Malhotra	Baghban	
2004 (49th)		Preity Zinta	Nisha Mehra	Koi... Mil Gaya	
2004 (49th)		Rani Mukerji	Priya Chopra	Chalte Chalte	
2004 (49th)		Urmila Matondkar	Swati	Bhoot	
2005 (50th)		Rani Mukerji ‡	Rhea Prakash	Hum Tum	
2005 (50th)		Aishwarya Rai	Neerja 'Neeru'	Raincoat	
2005 (50th)		Preity Zinta	Zaara Hayat Khan	Veer-Zaara	
2005 (50th)		Shilpa Shetty	Tamanna Sahni	Phir Milenge	
2005 (50th)		Urmila Matondkar	Sarika Vartak	Ek Hasina Thi	
2006 (51st)		Rani Mukerji ‡	Michelle McNally	Black	
2006 (51st)		Preity Zinta	Ambar 'Amby' Malhotra	Salaam Namaste	
2006 (51st)		Rani Mukerji	Vimmi 'Babli' Saluja	Bunty Aur Babli	
2006 (51st)		Sharmila Tagore	Sumitra V. Patwardhan	Viruddh... Family Comes First	
2006 (51st)		Vidya Balan	Lalita	Parineeta	
2007 (52nd)		Kajol ‡	Zooni Ali Beg	Fanaa	
2007 (52nd)		Aishwarya Rai	Sunehri	Dhoom 2	
2007 (52nd)		Bipasha Basu	Nishiganda 'Nishi' Dasgupta	Corporate	
2007 (52nd)		Kareena Kapoor	Dolly Mishra	Omkara	
2007 (52nd)		Rani Mukerji	Maya Talwar	Kabhi Alvida Naa Kehna	
2008 (53rd)		Kareena Kapoor ‡	Geet Dhillon	Jab We Met	
2008 (53rd)		Aishwarya Rai	Sujata Desai	Guru	
2008 (53rd)		Deepika Padukone	Shantipriya 'Shanti' Kashyap Mehra / Sandhya 'Sandy' Bansal	Om Shanti Om	
2008 (53rd)		Madhuri Dixit	Dia Shrivastava	Aaja Nachle	
2008 (53rd)		Rani Mukerji	Vibhavari 'Badki' Sahay	Laaga Chunari Mein Daag	
2008 (53rd)		Vidya Balan	Avni Chatturvedi / Manjulika	Bhool Bhulaiyaa	
2009 (54th)		Priyanka Chopra ‡	Meghna Mathur	Fashion	
2009 (54th)		Aishwarya Rai Bachchan	Jodhaa Bai	Jodhaa Akbar	
2009 (54th)		Anushka Sharma	Taani Surinder Sahni	Rab Ne Bana Di Jodi	
2009 (54th)		Asin Thottumkal	Kalpana Shetty	Ghajini	
2009 (54th)		Kajol	Piya Thapar Mehra	U Me Aur Hum	

=== 2010s ===
Year	Photos of winners	Actress	Role(s)	Film	Ref.
2010 (55th)		Vidya Balan ‡	Dr. Vidya	Paa	
2010 (55th)		Deepika Padukone	Meera Pandit	Love Aaj Kal	
2010 (55th)		Kareena Kapoor	Pia Sahastrabuddhe	3 Idiots	
2010 (55th)		Kareena Kapoor	Avantika Ahuja Khan	Kurbaan	
2010 (55th)		Katrina Kaif	Maya Sheikh	New York	
2010 (55th)		Priyanka Chopra	Sweety Shekhar Bhope	Kaminey	
2011 (56th)		Kajol ‡	Mandira Rathore Khan	My Name is Khan	
2011 (56th)		Aishwarya Rai Bachchan	Sofia D'Souza	Guzaarish	
2011 (56th)		Anushka Sharma	Shruti Kakkar	Band Baaja Baaraat	
2011 (56th)		Kareena Kapoor	Daboo	Golmaal 3	
2011 (56th)		Vidya Balan	Krishna Verma	Ishqiya	
2012 (57th)		Vidya Balan ‡	Reshma / Silk	The Dirty Picture	
2012 (57th)		Mahi Gill	Madhavi Devi	Saheb, Biwi Aur Gangster	
2012 (57th)		Katrina Kaif	Dimple Dixit	Mere Brother Ki Dulhan	
2012 (57th)		Priyanka Chopra	Susanna Anna-Marie Johannes	7 Khoon Maaf	
2012 (57th)		Vidya Balan	Sabrina Lal	No One Killed Jessica	
2013 (58th)		Vidya Balan ‡	Vidya Venkatesan Bagchi	Kahaani	
2013 (58th)		Deepika Padukone	Veronica Malaney	Cocktail	
2013 (58th)		Kareena Kapoor	Mahi Arora	Heroine	
2013 (58th)		Parineeti Chopra	Zoya Qureshi	Ishaqzaade	
2013 (58th)		Priyanka Chopra	Jhilmil Chatterjee	Barfi!	
2013 (58th)		Sridevi	Shashi Godbole	English Vinglish	
2014 (59th)		Deepika Padukone ‡	Leela Sanera	Goliyon Ki Raasleela Ram-Leela	
2014 (59th)		Deepika Padukone	Meenalochni 'Meenamma' Azhagusundaram	Chennai Express	
2014 (59th)		Parineeti Chopra	Gayatri	Shuddh Desi Romance	
2014 (59th)		Shraddha Kapoor	Aarohi Keshav Shirke	Aashiqui 2	
2014 (59th)		Sonakshi Sinha	Pakhi Roy Chaudhary	Lootera	
2014 (59th)		Sonam Kapoor	Zoya Haider	Raanjhanaa	
2015 (60th)		Kangana Ranaut ‡	Rani Mehra	Queen	
2015 (60th)		Alia Bhatt	Veera Tripathi	Highway	
2015 (60th)		Madhuri Dixit	Begum Para	Dedh Ishqiya	
2015 (60th)		Priyanka Chopra	Mary Kom	Mary Kom	
2015 (60th)		Rani Mukerji	Shivani Shivaji Roy	Mardaani	
2015 (60th)		Sonam Kapoor	Dr. Mrinalini 'Mili' Chakravarty	Khoobsurat	
2016 (61st)		Deepika Padukone ‡	Piku Banerjee	Piku	
2016 (61st)		Anushka Sharma	Meera	NH10	
2016 (61st)		Deepika Padukone	Mastani	Bajirao Mastani	
2016 (61st)		Kajol	Meera Dev Malik	Dilwale	
2016 (61st)		Kangana Ranaut	Tanuja 'Tanu' Trivedi / Kumari 'Kusum' Sangwan (Datto)	Tanu Weds Manu Returns	
2016 (61st)		Sonam Kapoor	Dolly / Madhuri / Priya / Bhagyashree	Dolly Ki Doli	
2017 (62nd)		Alia Bhatt ‡	Bauria (Mary Jane)	Udta Punjab	
2017 (62nd)		Aishwarya Rai Bachchan	Dalbir Kaur	Sarbjit	
2017 (62nd)		Alia Bhatt	Kaira	Dear Zindagi	
2017 (62nd)		Anushka Sharma	Alizeh Khan	Ae Dil Hai Mushkil	
2017 (62nd)		Sonam Kapoor	Neerja Bhanot	Neerja	
2017 (62nd)		Vidya Balan	Vidya Sinha / Durga Rani Singh	Kahaani 2	
2018 (63rd)		Vidya Balan ‡	Sulochana 'Sulu' Dubey	Tumhari Sulu	
2018 (63rd)		Alia Bhatt	Vaidehi Trivedi	Badrinath Ki Dulhania	
2018 (63rd)		Bhumi Pednekar	Sugandha Joshi Sharma	Shubh Mangal Saavdhan	
2018 (63rd)		Saba Qamar	Meeta Batra	Hindi Medium	
2018 (63rd)		Sridevi	Devki Sabarwal	Mom	
2018 (63rd)		Zaira Wasim	Insia Malik	Secret Superstar	
2019 (64th)		Alia Bhatt ‡	Sehmat Khan	Raazi	
2019 (64th)		Deepika Padukone	Rani Padmavati	Padmaavat	
2019 (64th)		Neena Gupta	Priyamvada 'Babli' Kaushik	Badhaai Ho	
2019 (64th)		Rani Mukerji	Naina Mathur	Hichki	
2019 (64th)		Tabu	Simi	Andhadhun	

=== 2020s ===
Year	Photos of winners	Actress	Role(s)	Film	Ref.
2020 (65th)		Alia Bhatt ‡	Safeena Firdausi	Gully Boy	
2020 (65th)		Kangana Ranaut	Rani Lakshmibai	Manikarnika: The Queen of Jhansi	
2020 (65th)		Kareena Kapoor Khan	Deepti Batra	Good Newwz	
2020 (65th)		Priyanka Chopra	Aditi Chaudhary	The Sky Is Pink	
2020 (65th)		Rani Mukerji	Shivani Roy	Mardaani 2	
2020 (65th)		Vidya Balan	Tara Shinde	Mission Mangal	
2021 (66th)		Taapsee Pannu ‡	Amrita Sabharwal	Thappad	
2021 (66th)		Deepika Padukone	Malti	Chhapaak	
2021 (66th)		Janhvi Kapoor	Gunjan Saxena	Gunjan Saxena: The Kargil Girl	
2021 (66th)		Kangana Ranaut	Jaya Nigam	Panga	
2021 (66th)		Vidya Balan	Shakuntala Devi	Shakuntala Devi	
2022 (67th)		Kriti Sanon ‡	Mimi Rathore	Mimi	
2022 (67th)		Kiara Advani	Dimple Cheema	Shershaah	
2022 (67th)		Parineeti Chopra	Sandeep Kaur Walia	Sandeep Aur Pinky Faraar	
2022 (67th)		Taapsee Pannu	Rashmi Chibber	Rashmi Rocket	
2022 (67th)		Vidya Balan	Vidya Vincent	Sherni	
2023 (68th)		Alia Bhatt ‡	Gangubai Kathiawadi	Gangubai Kathiawadi	
2023 (68th)		Bhumi Pednekar	Suman Singh	Badhaai Do	
2023 (68th)		Janhvi Kapoor	Mili Naudiyal	Mili	
2023 (68th)		Kareena Kapoor Khan	Rupa D'Souza	Laal Singh Chaddha	
2023 (68th)		Tabu	Anjulika/Manjulika	Bhool Bhulaiyaa 2	
2024 (69th)		Alia Bhatt ‡	Rani Chatterjee	Rocky Aur Rani Kii Prem Kahaani	
2024 (69th)		Bhumi Pednekar	Kanika Kapoor	Thank You for Coming	
2024 (69th)		Deepika Padukone	Rubina Mohsin	Pathaan	
2024 (69th)		Kiara Advani	Katha Kapadia	Satyaprem Ki Katha	
2024 (69th)		Rani Mukerji	Debika Chatterjee	Mrs Chatterjee vs Norway	
2024 (69th)		Taapsee Pannu	Manu Randhawa	Dunki	
2025 (70th)		Alia Bhatt ‡	Satyabhama "Satya" Anand	Jigra	
2025 (70th)		Kareena Kapoor Khan	Jasmine Kohli	Crew	
2025 (70th)		Kriti Sanon	Sifra	Teri Baaton Mein Aisa Uljha Jiya	
2025 (70th)		Shraddha Kapoor	phantasm with undisclosed name	Stree 2	
2025 (70th)		Tabu	Geeta Sethi	Crew	
2025 (70th)		Yami Gautam	Zooni Haksar	Article 370	
