= 16th Filmfare Awards =

1969 awards for Hindi cinema

- Date: 1969
- Site: Bombay

Highlights
- Best Film: Brahmachari
- Best Actor: Shammi Kapoor for Brahmachari
- Best Actress: Waheeda Rehman for Neel Kamal
- Most awards: Brahmachari (6)
- Most nominations: Brahmachari (9)

The 16th Filmfare Awards held in 1969 recognised the best Hindi cinema films released in 1968.

Brahmachari led the ceremony with 9 nominations, followed by Neel Kamal with 8 nominations, Ankhen with 7 nominations and Shikar with 5 nominations.

Brahmachari won 6 awards, including Best Film and Best Actor (for Shammi Kapoor), thus becoming the most-awarded film at the ceremony.

Dilip Kumar received dual nominations for Best Actor for his performances in Aadmi and Sunghursh, but lost to Shammi Kapoor, who won the award for Brahmachari, his first and only win in the category.

== Main awards ==
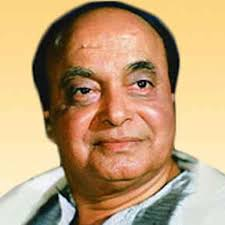
Ramanand Sagar — Best Director winner for Ankhen

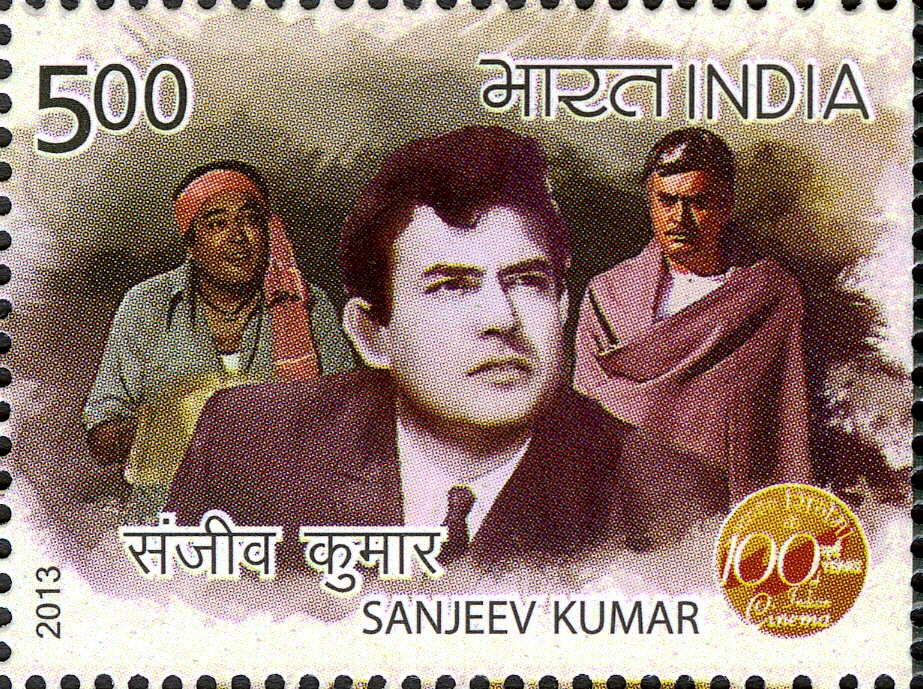
Sanjeev Kumar — Best Supporting Actor winner for Shikar

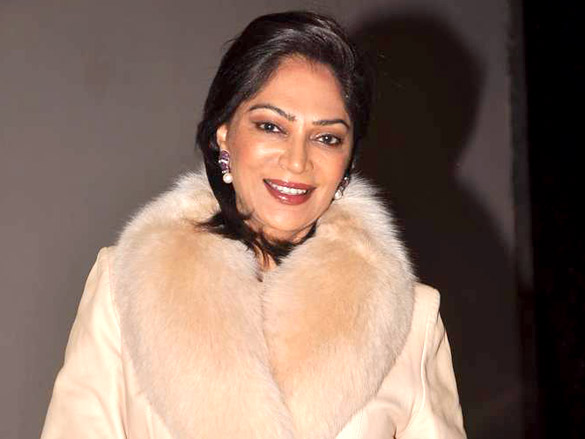
Simi Garewal — Best Supporting Actress winner for Saathi

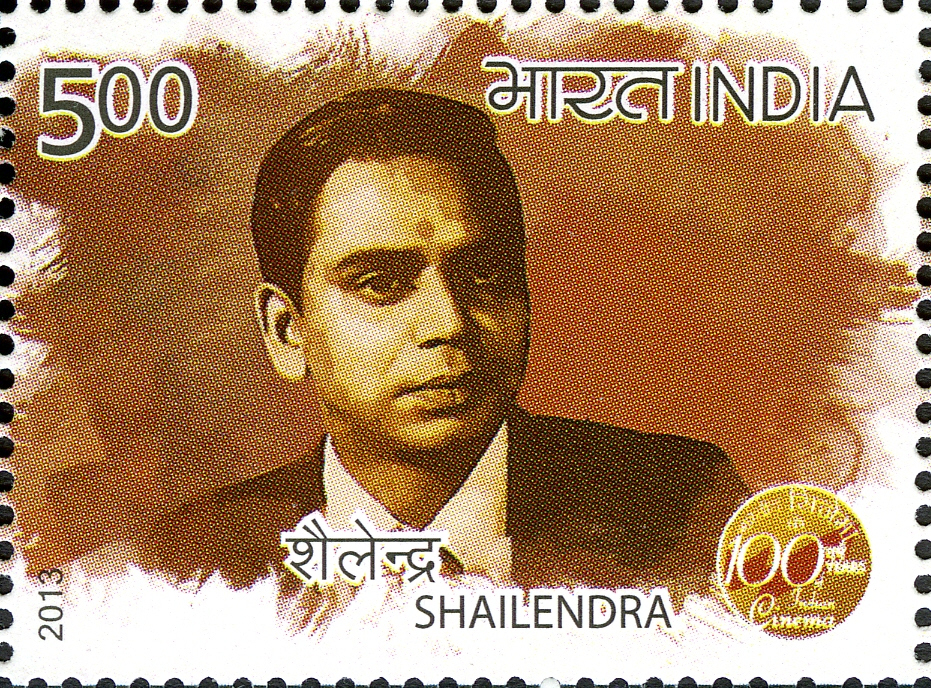
Shailendra — Best Lyricist winner for "Main Gaoon Tum" (Brahmachari)

=== Best Film ===
Brahmachari

- Ankhen
- Neel Kamal

=== Best Director ===
Ramanand Sagar – Ankhen

- Bhappi Soni – Brahmachari
- Ram Maheshwari – Neel Kamal

=== Best Actor ===
Shammi Kapoor – Brahmachari

- Dilip Kumar – Aadmi
- Dilip Kumar – Sunghursh

=== Best Actress ===
Waheeda Rehman – Neel Kamal

- Nargis – Raat Aur Din
- Saira Banu – Diwana

=== Best Supporting Actor ===
Sanjeev Kumar – Shikar

- Manoj Kumar – Aadmi
- Raj Kumar – Neel Kamal

=== Best Supporting Actress ===
Simi Garewal – Saathi

- Helen – Shikar
- Shashikala – Neel Kamal

=== Best Comic Actor ===
Johnny Walker – Shikar

- Mehmood – Neel Kamal
- Mehmood – Sadhu Aur Shaitaan

=== Best Story ===
Brahmachari – Sachin Bhowmick

- Ankhen – Ramanand Sagar
- Neel Kamal – Gulshan Nanda

=== Best Screenplay ===
Majhli Didi – Nabendu Ghosh

=== Best Dialogue ===
Saraswatichandra – S. Ali Raza

=== Best Music Director ===
Brahmachari – Shankar-Jaikishan

- Ankhen – Ravi
- Diwana – Shankar-Jaikishan

=== Best Lyricist ===
Brahmachari – Shailendra for Main Gaoon Tum

- Ankhen – Sahir Ludhianvi for Milti Hai Zindagi Main
- Brahmachari – Hasrat Jaipuri for Dil Ke Jharoke Main

=== Best Playback Singer, Male ===
Brahmachari – Mohammad Rafi for Dil Ke Jharoke Main

- Brahmachari – Mohammad Rafi for Main Gaoon Tum
- Neel Kamal – Mohammad Rafi for Baabul Ki Duaaein

=== Best Playback Singer, Female ===
Shikar – Asha Bhosle for Parde Mein Rehne Do

- Ankhen – Lata Mangeshkar for Milti Hai Zindagi Main
- Diwana – Sharda for Tumhari Bhi Jai Hai

=== Best Art Direction, B&W ===
Majhli Didi – Ajit Banerjee

=== Best Art Direction, Color ===
Noor Jehan – A. A. Majid

=== Best Cinematography, B&W ===
Saraswatichandra – Nariman A. Irani

=== Best Cinematography, Color ===
Ankhen – G. Singh

=== Best Editing ===
Saathi – N. M. Shankar

=== Best Sound ===
Shikar – P. Thakkersey

== Critics' awards ==
=== Best Documentary ===
Explorer

== Biggest winners ==
- Brahmachari – 6/9
- Shikar – 4/5
- Majhli Didi – 2/2
- Saathi – 2/2
- Saraswatichandra – 2/2
- Ankhen – 2/7
- Neel Kamal – 1/8

== See also ==
- 18th Filmfare Awards
- 17th Filmfare Awards
- Filmfare Awards
