= Amar Shaheed Bhagat Singh =

- Directed by: Omi Bedi
- Produced by: Ram Gopal Gupta
- Starring: Som Dutt; Dara Singh; Nanda; Achala Sachdev
- Music by: Surender Kohli
- Release date: 1974
- Country: India
- Language: Hindi

Amar Shaheed Bhagat Singh is a Hindi biographical drama film directed by Omi Bedi and produced by Ram Gopal Gupta based on the life of the great Indian revolutionary Bhagat Singh. This film was released in 1974 under the banner of Ram Gopal Chitramandir. It was originally released in Punjabi as Sardar Bhagat Singh.

== Plot ==
The film dramatizes the life of revolutionary Bhagat Singh during the Indian independence movement. It portrays his struggle against British colonial rule, formation of Hindustan Socialist Republican Association and ultimate martyrdom with other comrades in 1931.

== Cast ==
- Som Dutt as Bhagat Singh
- Dara Singh
- Nanda
- Kamal Kapoor
- Murad
- Achala Sachdev as Bhagat Singh's mother
- Rajan Haksar
- Rajni Bala
- Kamaldeep
- Dev Kumar
- Uma Dutta
