= Sabse Bada Rupaiya (1955 film) =

- Directed by: P. L. Santoshi
- Written by: Madhusudan Kalelkar
- Produced by: Alhad Chitra
- Starring: Agha; Shashikala
- Music by: O. P. Nayyar; Nashad
- Release date: 1955
- Country: India
- Language: Hindi

Sabse Bada Rupaiya (English: Money is the Greatest) is a 1955 Hindi film made by P. L. Santoshi and starring Agha, Shashikala in lead roles.

== Cast ==
- Shashikala as Laxmi
- Agha as Kishan
- Sunder as Rajaram
- Nana Palsikar
- Achla Sachdev
- Krishnakant
- Kundan

== Music ==
The music was composed by O. P. Nayyar (6 songs) and Nashad (3 songs). All songs were written by P. L. Santoshi and Majrooh Sultanpuri.

Song	Singer
"Baap Pareshan Hai Ji Baap Pareshan, Jiske Ghar Mein Chhokariya Hovengi Jawan, Hovengi Jawan"	Mohammed Rafi, Asha Bhosle, Shamshad Begum, S. Balbir
"Is Raat Diwali Yeh Kaisi, Is Raat Ujala Hai Kaisa, Yeh Kaisa Ujiyala Chhaya Hai"	Mohammed Rafi, Asha Bhosle, Shamshad Begum
"Bananewale Ne Rupaiya Bhaiya Gol Kyon Banaya"	Mohammed Rafi, Asha Bhosle
"Sabse Bada Hai Ji Sabse Bada Hai"	Mohammed Rafi, Asha Bhosle
"Kahe Patanga Deepak Se"	Asha Bhosle
"Thodi Der Aur Baitho"	Asha Bhosle
"Ae Dil Na Ro"	Asha Bhosle
"Daulat Buri Cheez Hai, Daulat Se Rehna Door Ji, Duniya Daulatwalon Ki Hai"	Asha Bhosle, Suhasini Kolhapure, S. Balbir
"Ruk Ja Re Piya"	Shamshad Begum

- Out of these 9 songs, the first 3 songs are music by Nashad and the rest 6 songs are music by O. P. Nayyar.
