= Ankhen (1968 film) =

- Film poster
- Directed by: Ramanand Sagar
- Written by: Ramanand Sagar
- Produced by: Ramanand Sagar
- Starring: Mala Sinha; Dharmendra; Mehmood; Kumkum; Sujit Kumar
- Cinematography: G. Singh
- Edited by: Lachhmandas
- Music by: Ravi
- Distributed by: Sagar Art International
- Release date: 1968
- Running time: 174 minutes
- Country: India
- Language: Hindi
- Box office: ₹6.5 crore

Ankhen (The Eyes) is a 1968 Hindi spy thriller produced and directed by Ramanand Sagar. The film stars Mala Sinha, Dharmendra, Mehmood, Lalita Pawar, Jeevan and Madan Puri. Inspired by the James Bond series, it has been described as India's first major spy thriller.

It was estimated to be the most profitable Hindi film of 1968 in India.

== Plot ==
Shortly after independence, India faces terrorists attacks in Assam, resulting in many deaths and casualties. A group of concerned citizens, who are not connected with the government, decide to do something to stop this carnage. While Salim is already at work in Beirut, his cover is blown, and he is shot dead. Now Sunil Mehra (Dharmendra) must travel to Beirut and take over. Once there, he meets a former flame, Meenakshi Mehta, and a female admirer by the name of Zenab.

The terrorists are headed by a man named Syed, who deputes one of his assistants, Madame, to spy on Sunil's dad, Diwan Chand Mehra, by posing as Mehra's daughter's aunt, forcing her to obey by abducting her son, Babloo, and holding him captive. Soon Syed and his associates, including Doctor X and Captain, find out all secrets of Mehra, as a result of which Sunil is trapped and held by Syed. Then Diwan's world is shattered when Meenakshi telephonically informs him that Sunil has been killed. The question remains what will happen to Babloo, Diwan, and the rest of the concerned citizens, especially when they have become vulnerable due to Madame's presence in their very household.

== Cast ==
- Dharmendra as Sunil
- Mala Sinha as Meenakshi Mehta
- Kumkum as Sunanda
- Sujit Kumar as Nadeem
- Mehmood as Mehmood
- Nazir Hussain as Major Diwanchand
- Parduman as Akram (Parduman is son of Dara Singh in real life
- Lalita Pawar as Madam
- Daisy Irani as Lily
- Jeevan as Doctor X
- Madan Puri as Captain
- Sajjan as Syed, Boss in Beirut
- Dhumal as Studio Owner
- Zeb Rehman as Princess Zehnab
- Madhumati as Madhu (Dancer)
- Master Ratan as Babloo
- Amarnath as Salim
- M. B. Shetty as Bald Guard
- A.A Khan
- Ishar Singh
- Hiralal as Sheikh (Jewellery dealer)

== Songs ==
The music is by Ravi and the lyrics by Sahir Ludhianvi. Gyan Varma, member of the Manoj-Gyan composer duo assisted Ravi in composing the songs of this film.

No.	Title	Singer(s)	Length
1.	"Milti Hai Zindagi Mein Mohabbat"	Lata Mangeshkar
2.	"Gairon Pe Karam"	Lata Mangeshkar
3.	"De Data Ke Naam Tujhko Allah Rakhe"	Manna Dey and Asha Bhosle
4.	"Loot Ja"	Asha Bhosle, Kamal Barot and Usha Mangeshkar
5.	"Meri Sunle Aaj"	Lata Mangeshkar
6.	"Us Mulk Ki Sarhad Ko"	Mohammed Rafi

== Awards ==
Awards	Category	Nominee	Result
16th Filmfare Awards	Best Film	Ramanand Sagar	Nominated
16th Filmfare Awards	Best Director	Ramanand Sagar	Won
16th Filmfare Awards	Best Story	Ramanand Sagar	Nominated
16th Filmfare Awards	Best Music Director	Ravi	Nominated
16th Filmfare Awards	Best Lyricist	Sahir Ludhyanvi	Nominated
16th Filmfare Awards	Best Female Playback Singer	Lata Mangeshkar	Nominated
16th Filmfare Awards	Best Cinematography (colour)	G. Singh	Won
