= Mehbooba (1976 film) =

1976 film by Shakti Samanta

- Poster
- Directed by: Shakti Samanta
- Written by: Gulshan Nanda
- Produced by: Mushir–Riaz
- Starring: Rajesh Khanna; Hema Malini; Prem Chopra
- Cinematography: Aloke Dasgupta
- Edited by: Bijoy Chowdhury
- Music by: R. D. Bumran
- Production company: M. R. Productions
- Release date: 19 July 1976
- Running time: 134 minutes
- Country: India
- Language: Hindi

Mehbooba is a 1976 Indian Hindi-language romantic drama film, produced by Mushir–Riaz and directed by Shakti Samanta. The film stars Rajesh Khanna, Hema Malini and Prem Chopra in pivotal roles.

It is based on Gulshan Nanda's novel Sisakte Saaz and deals with the theme of reincarnation, which was also previously explored in successful films like Mahal (1949), Madhumati (1958) and Milan (1967).

== Plot ==
Singer Suraj is presented with a tanpura by his fiancée's father. Thereafter, he starts hearing a haunting song at nights. One day, while going for a stage show, stuck in heavy rain, he goes to a small unknown motel, where he meets a woman named Ratna. During the night, he sees Ratna, singing the same song he often hears at night, and walking towards a dilapidated palace. Instinctively, he follows her into the haveli and calls out her name. He is told by an old keeper of the palace that Ratna died more than 1000 years ago and people believe that she still haunts that place.

As he walks around, a portrait of Ratna makes Suraj remember their previous life where he was Prakash, the chief singer of the royal court and was in love with Ratna, the court dancer. They are unable to get married as Prakash is betrothed to Jamuna and Ratna is destined to become the royal courtesan. They decided to elope but are killed on their way. They die promising each other that they will meet again.

Coming back to his senses, Suraj feels confused. He then runs into a gypsy girl Jhumri, who he believes is Ratna's reincarnation. He is able to make Jhumri remember her past life and her love for Prakash. The two declare their undying love for each other. This angers Suraj's fiancée Rita Malhotra, as well as Popatlal , who is after Jhumri. Popatlal steals the portrait, and sets the gypsies against Suraj, ensuring a fight between Suraj and the gypsies. How Suraj and Jhumri overcome all obstacles and consummate their relationship this time round forms the climax.

== Cast ==
Actor	Role
Rajesh Khanna	Prakash / Suraj
Hema Malini	Ratna / Jhumri
Prem Chopra	Appa
Asrani	Sinha
Sujit Kumar	Dr. Vinod
Madan Puri	Sardar
Manmohan Krishna	Bandhe Ali Khan
Asha Sachdev	Rita Malhotra
Harindranath Chattopadhyay	Rita's father
Nazir Hussain	Guruji
Meena T.	Gauri
Leela Mishra	Jhumri's mother
Alankar Joshi	Buntu
Chandrashekhar	Thakur Himmat Singh
Yogeeta Bali	Jamuna Singh

== Awards ==
24th Filmfare Awards:

Nominated

- Best Actress – Hema Malini
- Best Supporting Actor – Prem Chopra
- Best Music Director – R. D. Burman
- Best Lyricist – Anand Bakshi for "Mere Naina Sawan Bhadon"
- Best Story – Gulshan Nanda

== Soundtrack ==
The film's soundtrack was composed by R. D. Burman, with lyrics penned by Anand Bakshi.

- "Parbat Ke Peechhe" was listed at #16 on Binaca Geetmala annual list 1976
- "Mere Naina Sawan Bhadon" (Female) was listed at #17 on Binaca Geetmala annual list 1976

Song	Singer	Raga
"Mere Naina Sawan Bhadon" (Male)	Kishore Kumar	Shivaranjani
"Mehbooba Mehbooba"	Kishore Kumar	
"Parbat Ke Peechhe"	Kishore Kumar, Lata Mangeshkar	Jogiya
"Chalo Ri, Chalo Ri"	Lata Mangeshkar	
"Aapke Shahar Mein Aai Hoon"	Lata Mangeshkar	
"Jamuna Kinare Aaja"	Lata Mangeshkar	Maru Bihag
"Mere Naina Sawan Bhadon" (Female)	Lata Mangeshkar	Shivaranjani
"Gori Tori Paijaniya"	Manna Dey	Sarang

== Reception ==
Despite being highly anticipated before release owing to the return of the combination of Shakti Samanta–Rajesh Khanna and music by R. D. Burman, Mehbooba proved to be an "average" fare commercially. It was a hit in West Bengal, but could not do that well in other major territories.
