= Neel Kamal (1968 film) =

- Film poster
- Directed by: Ram Maheshwari
- Written by: Ela Maheshwari; Kidar Sharma; Vinay Chatterjee
- Screenplay by: Phani Majumdar
- Story by: Gulshan Nanda
- Produced by: Pannalal Maheshwari
- Starring: Waheeda Rehman; Manoj Kumar; Raaj Kumar
- Cinematography: Fali Mistry
- Edited by: D. N. Pai
- Music by: Ravi
- Production companies: Famous Cine Studios; Tardeo; Mumbai; Kalpanalok
- Release date: 21 September 1968
- Running time: 160 minutes
- Country: India
- Language: Hindi

Neel Kamal is a 1968 Indian Hindi-language romantic thriller directed by Ram Maheshwari, starring Waheeda Rehman as the eponymous lead, Raaj Kumar, Manoj Kumar, Mehmood, Balraj Sahni, Lalita Pawar and Shashikala.

Neel Kamal proved to be a major commercial success at the box-office, becoming the third highest-grossing film of 1968.

At the 16th Filmfare Awards, Neel Kamal received 8 nominations including Best Film, Best Director (Maheshwari). Best Supporting Actor (Raaj Kumar), Best Supporting Actress (Shashikala) and Best Comedian (Mehmood), and won Best Actress for Rehman, her second win in the category after Guide (1965).

== Plot ==
Sita and her friends go on a college trip. Sita sleepwalks and when she is about to be hit by a train on the railway track, Ram saves her. Impressed, her father decides to get her married to him.

After marriage, Sita discovers that her sleepwalking is not the usual kind, as it takes her to the story of her past life.

Chitrasen, an artisan, was in love with the princess Neel Kamal (Sita in her past life). The king rejects his alliance for his daughter and as a punishment, buries him alive. Chitrasen's love for Neel Kamal remained immortal and his soul survives for centuries in hopes to meet her and be with her. One night, while sleep walking, Sita is invited to Chitrasen's burial by a song. Her mother-in-law, a very cross person, believes that Sita is having an affair and gives her a tough time at home along with her sister-in-law Chanchal. Her only supporter in the house is Giridhar, Chanchal's husband, who is a ghar jamai and saves her from committing suicide with the help of a Pujari (David).

Sita's father also comes in search of his daughter at Ram's house to whom he has informed of her sleepwalking several times earlier. However, Ram's family prepares for a second marriage of Ram after Girdhar informs them that Sita is dead, but Giridhar secretly informs Ram that Sita is alive and now pregnant. One night while traveling by train, she stops the train by pulling the chain at the same Chitrapur station. Sita reaches Chitrasen's place and they have a brief past conversation with his immortal soul. Finally, Chitrasen's soul becomes free and Sita falls unconscious. Ram rescues her and they live happily.

== Cast ==
- Waheeda Rehman as Rajkumari Neel Kamal / Sita
- Manoj Kumar as Ram
- Raaj Kumar as Chitrasen
- Lalita Pawar as Thakurain
- Mehmood as Girdhar Gopal Agarwal
- Shashikala as Chanchal
- Balraj Sahni as Mr. Raichand
- Ramayan Tiwari
- P. Jairaj
- David Abraham as Guruji
- Murad as Emperor
- Chhaya
- Nasreen
- Nandini
- Gopal Sehgal
- Jagdish Raj
- Ruby Mayer as Dean of the girls' college
- Mumtaz Begum
- Sheela R.
- Sophia
- Shenaaz
- Apsara
- Abhimanyu Sharma
- Rajan Kapoor
- Nazir Kashmiri
- V.P. Verma
- Dev Chand
- Shribhagwan
- Bhushan Tiwari
- Vijay Maria

== Soundtrack ==
The soundtrack of Neel Kamal were composed by Ravi Shankar Sharma and lyrics were provided by Sahir Ludhianvi.

Track	Song	Performed By	Lyrics	Raag
1	"Rom Rom Mein Basne Waale Ram"	Asha Bhosle	Sahir Ludhianvi	
2	"Aaja Tujhko Pukare Mera Pyar"	Mohammad Rafi	Sahir Ludhianvi	Pahadi
3	"Wo Zindagi Jo Thi Ab Tak Teri Panaahon Mein"	Asha Bhosle	Sahir Ludhianvi	
4	"Baabul Ki Duaayein Leti Jaa"	Mohammad Rafi	Sahir Ludhianvi	
5	"Sharma Ke Yun Na Dekh"	Mohammed Rafi	Sahir Ludhianvi	
6	"Aao Ni Sakhiyon"	Asha Bhosle	Sahir Ludhianvi	
7	"Khali Dabba Khali Botal"	Manna Dey	Sahir Ludhianvi	

== Awards and nominations ==
16th Filmfare Awards:

Won

- Best Actress – Waheeda Rehman

Nominated

- Best Film – Pannalal Maheshwari
- Best Director – Ram Maheshwari
- Best Supporting Actor – Raaj Kumar
- Best Supporting Actress – Shashikala
- Best Comedian – Mehmood
- Best Male Playback Singer – Mohammad Rafi for "Baabul Ki Duaayein Leti Jaa"
- Best Story – Gulshan Nanda
