= Chhote Sarkar (1974 film) =

Chhote Sarkaar
- Directed by: K. Shankar
- Story by: Gulshan Nanda
- Starring: Shammi Kapoor; Sadhana; Shashikala; Helen
- Music by: Shankar–Jaikishan
- Release date: 22 September 1974
- Country: India
- Language: Hindi

Chhote Sarkaar is a 1974 Indian Bollywood film starring Shammi Kapoor. Directed by K. Shankar, it also stars Sadhana, Shashikala, and Helen in pivotal roles.

== Plot ==
Raja and Moti are twins. While Moti is loved by everyone, Raja, who paints women, is considered a fool. When Moti's wife Seema falsely accuses Raja of rape, the family throws him out of the house.

== Cast ==
- Shammi Kapoor as Raja / Moti (Double Role)
- Sadhana as Radhika
- Shashikala as Seema
- Helen as Kasturi
- Sulochana Latkar as Raja & Moti's Mother
- Jagdish Raj as Jaggu
- Asit Sen as Talwar
- Shammi as Gulabi
- Sunder as Radhika's Uncle

== Soundtrack ==
Lyrics: Rajendra Krishan

| Song | Singer |
|---|---|
| "Main Kesar Kasturi" | Krishna Kalle |
| "Tere Chehre Mein Hai" | Mohammed Rafi |
| "O Jhuke Jhuke Nainonwali, Aaja Mere Paas" | Mohammed Rafi, Asha Bhosle |
| "Kya Roz Roz Peena" | Asha Bhosle |
