= Neela Aakash =

- Poster
- Directed by: Rajendra Bhatia
- Starring: Dharmendra; Mala Sinha; Shashikala
- Music by: Madan Mohan; Raja Mehdi Ali Khan (lyrics)
- Release date: 1965
- Country: India
- Language: Hindi

Neela Aakash (transl. Blue sky) is a 1965 Indian Hindi-language romance film directed by Rajendra Bhatia. The film stars Dharmendra and Mala Sinha in the lead roles. It also stars Mehmood, Raj Mehra, Sulochana Latkar, and others. The film's music is by Madan Mohan and features the song "Aapko Pyar Chhupane Ki Buri Aadat Hai".

== Plot ==
Neela is a well educated girl who lives with her younger brother, sister and parents. Her father is addicted to gambling and alcohol and gets fired from his job due to misappropriation of some funds in his office which he commits for his gambling needs. Forced with circumstances, Neela decides to do a job as an air hostess in Indian Airlines. while on job she meets Aakash who works as a pilot in the same airline. After initial misunderstandings both fall in love with each other. Aakash proposes to Neela for marriage but Neela is concerned about her family as she is the only bread earner of her family and is responsible for education and other needs of her younger siblings. There is some more trouble as Neela's drunkard father does not like their relationship as Neela is his only source of money. There is also a sub-plot of Rita's crush on Aakash and her attempt to create misunderstandings between Neela and Aakash.

== Cast ==
- Dharmendra – Aakash
- Mala Sinha – Neela
- Mehmood – Madanlal
- Shashikala – Rita
- Madan Puri- Abdul
- Raj Mehra – Karamchand, Neela's father
- Sulochana Latkar – Mrs. Karamchand, Neela's mother
- Mopet Raja – Bantu
- Manorama – Rita's mother
- Mumtaz Begum – Aakash's mother
- Sabita Chatterjee – Chanda Chamkani
- Hari Shivdasani – Khoobchand Chamkani
- Madhavi – Kamini

== Soundtrack ==
The music of the film was composed by Madan Mohan, while lyrics were written by Raja Mehdi Ali Khan. The 'Aap ko pyaar chhupane ki buri aadat hai' song featuring Dharmendra and Mala Sinha was shot at Lodhi Gardens in Delhi for four days in summer.

#	Song	Singer
1	"Aakhri Geet Mohabbat Ka Suna Loon"	Mohammed Rafi
2	"Pyaar Woh Shay Hai Ae Mere Yaaron"	Mohammed Rafi
3	"Mere Dil Se Aake Lipat Gayi"	Asha Bhosle, Mohammed Rafi
4	"Tere Paas Aa Ke Mera Waqt Guzar Jaata Hai"	Asha Bhosle, Mohammed Rafi
5	"Aap Ko Pyaar Chhupane Ki Buri Aadat Hai"	Asha Bhosle, Mohammed Rafi
6	"In Aankhon Se Nazar Ka Teer"	Asha Bhosle
7	"Preet Basi Hai Meri Nas Nas Mein"	Asha Bhosle
8	"Na Aasman Na Sitare Fareb Dete Hai"	Lata Mangeshkar
9	"Banke Saiyan Ne Kalaiya Maror Daali"	Mehmood
