= Arzoo (1965 film) =

- Film poster
- Directed by: Ramanand Sagar
- Written by: Ramanand Sagar
- Produced by: Ramanand Sagar
- Starring: Rajendra Kumar; Sadhana; Feroz Khan
- Cinematography: G. Singh
- Edited by: Lachhmandass
- Music by: Shankar–Jaikishan
- Distributed by: Sagar Art Cooperation
- Release date: 15 January 1965
- Running time: 177 minutes
- Country: India
- Language: Hindi

Arzoo (transl. Wish) is a 1965 Indian romantic drama film directed, produced and written by Ramanand Sagar. Loosely based on the 1957 Hollywood film An Affair to Remember, which was itself a remake of the 1939 film Love Affair, it stars Rajendra Kumar, Sadhana and Feroz Khan in the lead.

At the 13th Filmfare Awards, Arzoo received five nominations: Best Supporting Actor for Rajendra Kumar, Best Music Director for Shankar–Jaikishan, Best Director and Best Story for Ramanand Sagar, Best Lyricist for Hasrat Jaipuri for the song "Aji Rooth Kar Ab Kahan Jaiyega".

== Plot ==
Gopal (Rajendra Kumar) is a skiing champion. He meets Usha (Sadhana) on his holidays at Jammu and Kashmir with the fake name Sarju. Then they both fall in love. One day, Usha tells Gopal that she does not like the disabled. According to her instead of living a life of disabled, it is better to die.

After spending his holidays in Kashmir and promising Usha that he will marry her, he heads back to Delhi, where his parents and a sister, Sarla, live. Along the way, he loses his leg in a car accident. Gopal becomes worried. Since he remembers the words of Usha, he tries to avoid her to go away from her life.

He thinks Usha will not accept him as he is now disabled. Then he goes back to Delhi and he does not tell anything about Usha. In the meantime, Usha tries a lot to find him, but after having no sign of him, she begins to think that Gopal is in some trouble and hence unable to contact her.

Gopal's best friend, Ramesh (Feroz Khan), unknowing about his friend's love story, wants to marry Usha. After saying "no" several times, at Usha's father accepts on her behalf and Usha dutifully agrees to the marriage as well. But on the day of her wedding, a miracle happens in the form of Kashmir Houseboat owner Mamdhu (Mehmood) and initially Ramesh and then Usha finds out that Gopal and Sarju are not two persons, but one. This situation forms the climax of the movie.

== Cast ==
Character	Actor/Actress(s)
Gopal / Sarju	Rajendra Kumar
Usha Kapoor	Sadhana
Ramesh	Feroz Khan
Mamdhu Mumtazali	Mehmood Ali
Sarla	Nazima
Diwan Kishan Kishore	Nazir Hussain
Gopal's Mom	Achala Sachdev
Doctor	Nana Palsikar
Ramesh's Dad	Brahm Bhardwaj
Munshi Ashadaulal	Dhumal
Major Kapoor	Hari Shivdasani
Sabhi	Malika
Ramesh's Servant	Jankidas Mehra
Roop Chand (Manchu's) Friend in Delhi	Khairati
Major Kapoor's Servant	Narmada Shankar
Major Kapoor's Wife	Praveen Paul
Taxi Driver	Mohinder Singh Athwal

== Soundtrack ==
The film's soundtrack was composed by Shankar–Jaikishan, with lyrics for all the songs written by Hasrat Jaipuri. It was the eighth highest-selling Hindi film album of the 1960s.

- "Aji Rooth Kar Ab Kahan Jaaiyega" was listed at #9 on Binaca Geetmala annual list 1966
- "Chhalke Teri Ankhon Se" was listed at #29 on Binaca Geetmala annual list 1966

Title	Singer(s)
"Jab Ishq Kahin Ho Jaata Hai"	Asha Bhosle, Mubarak Begum
"Bedardi Baalma Tujhko"	Lata Mangeshkar
"Aji Rooth Kar Ab Kahan Jaaiyega"	Lata Mangeshkar
"Aji Humse Bachkar Kahan Jaaiyega"	Mohammed Rafi
"Ae Phoolon Ki Rani"	Mohammed Rafi
"Ae Nargis-e-Mastana"	Mohammed Rafi
"Chhalke Teri Ankhon Se"	Mohammed Rafi

== Reception ==
Widely anticipated before release owing to the hit actor-director combination of Ramanand Sagar and Rajendra Kumar, Arzoo received critical praise for its cinematography, performances and chart-topping soundtrack and proved to be a blockbuster. It was also Kumar's fifth consecutive major success and ran for 26 weeks in Kolkata's iconic Hind Cinema.

The film's success took Sadhana to the top spot among her contemporaries and made the then struggling newcomer Feroz Khan a known face, who began to receive A-list offers and eventually became a saleable name in the 1970s.
