= Himalay Ki God Mein =

- Theatrical poster
- Directed by: Vijay Bhatt
- Written by: Virendra Sinha
- Produced by: Shankerbhai Bhatt
- Starring: Manoj Kumar; Mala Sinha; Shashikala
- Cinematography: Pravin Bhatt
- Edited by: Pratap Dave
- Music by: Kalyanji Anandji
- Release date: 1965
- Country: India
- Language: Hindi
- Box office: ₹ 4.5 Crore

Himalay Ki God Mein (transl. In the Lap of the Himalayas) is a 1965 Indian Hindi-language film directed by Vijay Bhatt, starring Manoj Kumar and Mala Sinha, with Shashikala in a supporting role. The film won the Filmfare Best Movie Award and was a "superhit" at the box office, listed in the top 20 earners of the 1960s. The film was remade in Telugu as Doctor Babu and in Tamil as Puthiya Bhoomi.

== Plot ==
Sunil Mehra (played by Manoj Kumar) completes his medical studies and becomes a doctor. He is kidnapped by dacoits in the Himalayas, harassed, and left badly hurt. Phoolwa, a villager (played by Mala Sinha), finds and nurses him back to health. Both fall in love but her dacoit father Lakhan Singh (played by Jayant) comes in their way. Sunil is already engaged to Neeta (played by Shashikala). He then leaves for his home in the city.

He returns to the Himalayas to help poor people who do not have proper facilities for medical care. Villagers resist his arrival as they do not trust his modern medicines and only believe in local healers. Also, Lakhan Singh repeatedly interrupts his activities. Worried for him, Sunil's family sends his fiancée Neeta to get him back. Sunil in turn asks Neeta, who is also a doctor, to stay there with him. But Neeta is not very comfortable in the village atmosphere. She returns to the city. Firm in his decision, Sunil stays and wins the hearts of the villagers and also of Lakhan Singh who finally comes to his rescue.

== Cast ==
- Manoj Kumar as Dr. Sunil Mehra
- Mala Sinha as Phoolwa
- Shashikala as Dr. Neeta Verma
- Jayant as Lakhan Singh
- Kanhaiyalal as Ghoghar Baba
- David Abraham as Dayal Singh
- D.K. Sapru as D.I.G. Shyam Lal Mehra
- Achala Sachdev as Mrs. Shyam Lal Mehra
- Mukri as Budhimaan
- Jeevan Kala as Bindiya

== Music ==
The music for the film was composed by the duo Kalyanji Anandji.

| No. | Title | Lyrics | Singer(s) | Length |
|---|---|---|---|---|
| 1. | "Oonche Himalay Ke Neeche" | Anand Bakshi | Lata Mangeshkar | 03:22 |
| 2. | "Kankariya Maar Ke Jagaya" | Anand Bakshi | Lata Mangeshkar | 03:20 |
| 3. | "Tu Raat Khadi Thi Chhat Pe" | Anand Bakshi | Mohammad Rafi, Usha Timothy | 06:28 |
| 4. | "Ek Tu Jo Mila" | Indeevar | Lata Mangeshkar | 02:58 |
| 5. | "Chand Si Mehbooba Ho Meri" | Anand Bakshi | Mukesh | 03:22 |
| 6. | "Ek Tu Na Mila" (Raga Charukeshi) | Indeevar | Lata Mangeshkar |
| 7. | "Main To Ek Khwab Hoon" (Raga Todi, with Multani) | Qamar Jalalabadi | Mukesh | 03:19 |

== Awards ==
13th Filmfare Awards:

Won

- Best Film – Shri Prakash Pictures
- Best Editing – Pratap Dave

Nominated

- Best Actress – Mala Sinha
- Best Supporting Actress – Shashikala
- Best Music Director – Kalyanji–Anandji
- Best Lyricist – Indeevar for "Ek Tu Naa Mila"
- Best Female Playback Singer – Lata Mangeshkar for "Ek Tu Naa Mila"
