= Shashikala =

Indian actress (1932–2021)

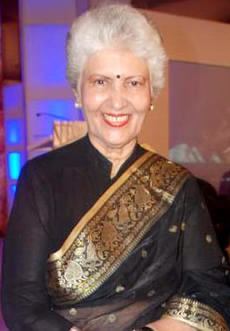
- Shashikala, c. 2012
- Born: Shashikala Jawalkar; 4 August 1932; Solapur, Bombay Presidency, British India
- Died: 4 April 2021 (aged 88); Mumbai, Maharashtra, India
- Other name: Shashikala Saigal
- Years active: 1944–2006
- Notable work: Aarti (1962); Gumrah (1963)
- Spouse: Om Prakash Saigal (m. 1951)
- Awards: 2 Filmfare Awards for Best Supporting Actress
- Honours: Padma Shri (2007)

Shashikala Saigal (née Jawalkar; 4 August 1932 – 4 April 2021), better known by her first name, was an Indian film and television actress, who played supporting roles in hundreds of Bollywood films beginning in the 1940s.

== Early years ==
Shashikala Jawalkar was one of six children born in Solapur, Maharashtra to a Hindu Bhavsar Shimpi caste Marathi speaking family. By age 5, she had already been dancing, singing and acting on stage in many towns in Solapur district. When Shashikala was in her pre-teens, through ill luck, her father became bankrupt, and he brought his family to Bombay (now Mumbai), where they thought that Shashikala, the best-looking and most-talented among his children, could find work in movies. For some time, the family lived with friends and barely survived, while Shashikala wandered from one studio to another looking for work. She earned in bits and pieces till she met Noor Jehan, the reigning screen queen.

Noor Jehan's husband Shaukat Hussain Rizvi, was making the movie Zeenat then, and included Shashikala in a Qawwali scene. Rizvi gave her a supporting role alongside Noorjehan and Dilip Kumar in the 1947 film Jugnu. She acted with Dilip Kumar again in the 1950 film Arzoo.

She worked with Shammi Kapoor in film Daku (1955). She struggled on and got small roles in movies made by P. N. Arora, Amiya Chakravarti, and a few other producers. She first rose to fame with her role in Hindi film Pugdi (1948) produced by Prem Narayan Arora. She got roles in V. Shantaram's Teen Batti Char Raasta (1953) and a few other movies. While in her early twenties, Shashikala met and married Om Prakash Saigal, who belonged to the Kundan Lal Saigal family, and has two daughters.

== Acclaimed supporting roles ==
In 1959, she appeared in Bimal Roy's film Sujata. In Tarachand Barjatya's Aarti (1962), starring Meena Kumari, Ashok Kumar, and Pradeep Kumar, Shashikala portrayed a negative role, which received positive reviews, and earned her the Filmfare Award for Best Supporting Actress. Soon after, offers began to pour in to her for supporting roles. She appeared in Gumrah (1963) which won her a second Filmfare Award for Best Supporting Actress, Ayee Milan Ki Bela (1964), Godaan (1964), Himalay Ki God Mein (1965), Waqt (1965), Anupama (1966), Phool Aur Patthar (1966), Neel Kamal (1968), and Khubsoorat (1980). She played a negative character in Chhote Sarkar (1974) starring Shammi Kapoor and Sadhana. While her female lead co-stars usually played roles of good-natured, modest, or pious women, Shashikala usually played either flighty and feisty bubbly women or vamps who plotted the downfall of others. Later in her acting career, she would typically play the role of a sister or mother-in-law. In 80s her acclaimed performances came in films like Phir Wahi Raat, Souten, Sargam. She performed in supporting roles in more than 100 films.

== Recent acting roles ==
In the past years, she has performed in a few television serials, including Jeena Isi Ka Naam Hai for Sony, Apnaapan for Zee TV, Dil Deke Dekho for Sab TV and Son Pari for Star Plus. She had roles in Mother 98, Pardesi Babu, Baadshah, Kabhi Khushi Kabhie Gham, Mujhse Shaadi Karogi and Chori Chori.

== Awards ==
Civilian Award

- 2007 – Padma Shri – India's fourth highest civilian honour from the Government of India.

Film Awards

| Year | Award | Film | Category | Result | Ref. |
|---|---|---|---|---|---|
| 1962 | Bengal Film Journalists' Association Awards | Aarti | Best Supporting Actress (Hindi) | Won | |
| 1963 | Bengal Film Journalists' Association Awards | Gumrah | Best Supporting Actress (Hindi) | Won | |
| 1969 | Bengal Film Journalists' Association Awards | Rahgir | Best Supporting Actress (Hindi) | Won | |
| 1960 | Filmfare Awards | Sujata | Best Supporting Actress | Nominated | |
| 1963 | Filmfare Awards | Aarti | Best Supporting Actress | Won | |
| 1964 | Filmfare Awards | Gumrah | Best Supporting Actress | Won | |
| 1965 | Filmfare Awards | Ayee Milan Ki Bela | Best Supporting Actress | Nominated | |
| 1966 | Filmfare Awards | Himalay Ki God Mein | Best Supporting Actress | Nominated | |
| 1967 | Filmfare Awards | Phool Aur Patthar | Best Supporting Actress | Nominated | |
| 1967 | Filmfare Awards | Anupama | Best Supporting Actress | Nominated | |
| 1969 | Filmfare Awards | Neel Kamal | Best Supporting Actress | Nominated | |

== Selected filmography ==
- Karodpati (1936)
- Chand (1944)
- Zeenat (1945) as Qawalli singer (one of the females)
- Jugnu (1947)
- Doli (1947) (as Sashikala)
- Pugree (1948)
- Girls' School (1949)
- Bombay (1949)
- Bholi (1949)
- Aakhri Paigham (1949)
- Thes (1949)
- Rupaiya (1950)
- Raj Rani (1950)
- Patthe Bapurao (1950)
- Arzoo (1950) as Kamla
- Sarkar (1951)
- Chamkee (1952)
- Ajeeb Ladki (1952)
- Teen Batti Char Raasta (1953) as Lalita (Maratha wife)
- Madmust (1953)
- Jeewan Jyoti (1953) as Leela
- Chacha Chowdhury (1953)
- Surang (1953) as Pagli
- Parichay (1954)
- Shart (1954) as Toto
- Sangam (1954)
- Samaj (1954) (as Sashikala)
- Sitara (1955)
- Sakhi Lutera (1955)
- Sabse Bada Rupaiya (1955)
- Hoor-E-Arab (1955)
- Daku (1955)
- Bahu (1955)
- Abe-Hayat (1955) as Shehzadi
- Taj Aur Talwar (1956)
- Patrani (1956) as Namunjala
- Kar Bhala (1956)
- Diwali Ki Raat (1956)
- Bhagam Bhag (1956) as Shashi
- Bandhan (1956) as Shanta
- Arab Ka Saudagar (1956)
- Jahazi Lutera (1957)
- Beti (1957)
- Nau Do Gyarah (1957) as Neeta
- Lal Batti (1957)
- Captain Kishore (1957)
- Chandu (1958)
- Chalta Purza (1958)
- 12 O'Clock (1958) as Neena
- Sun To Le Hasina (1958)
- Jung Bahadur (1958)
- Madam XYZ (1959)
- Khoobsurat Dhokha (1959)
- Sujata (1959) as Rama Chowdhury
- Rangeela Raja (1960)
- Kanoon (1960) as Murder's Girl Friend
- Teer Aur Talwar (1960)
- Singapore (1960) as Shobha
- Jo Huwa So Bhool Jao (1960)
- Do Aadmi (1960)
- Flight to Assam (1961)
- Junglee (1961) as Mala (as Shashi Kala)
- Krorepati (1961) as Roopa
- Batwara (1961) as Kala
- Hariyali Aur Rasta (1962) as Rita
- Naag Devata (1962)
- Anpadh (1962) as Basanti
- Aarti (1962) as Jaswanti
- Gumrah (1963) as Leela/Miss Roberts
- Commercial Pilot Officer (1963)
- Yeh Rastey Hain Pyar Ke (1963) as Asha
- Satyavan Savitri (1963)
- Hamrahi (1963) as Hemalata 'Hema'
- Godaan (1963)
- Punar Milan (1964) as Shobhna Bakshi
- Mera Qasoor Kya Hai (1964) as Shashi
- Jahan Ara (1964) as Karuna
- Ayee Milan Ki Bela (1964) as Roopa
- Apne Huye Paraye (1964) as Lata
- Aap Ki Parchhaiyan (1964) as Rekha
- Himalay Ki God Mein (1965) as Dr. Neeta Verma (as Shashi Kala)
- Waqt (1965) as Rani sahiba
- Teesra Kaun (1965) as Lily
- Neela Aakash (1965) as Rita
- Bheegi Raat (1965) as Vinita / Vinnie
- Bedaag (1965) as Lata
- Sunehre Qadam (1966)
- Anupama (1966) as Anita Bakshi 'Annie'
- Phool Aur Patthar (1966) as Rita
- Toofan Men Pyar Kahan (1966)
- Pyar Mohabbat (1966) as Mohini
- Pati Patni (1966) as Lali
- Neend Hamari Khwab Tumhare (1966) as Ms. Paul
- Do Dilon Ki Dastaan (1966)
- Devar (1966) as Shanta M. Singh / Shanta S. Rai
- Daadi Maa (1966) as Ganga
- Mehrban (1967) as Devki
- Chhoti Si Mulaqat (1967) as Sonia
- Neel Kamal (1968) as Chanchal
- Aabroo (1968) as Shanta
- Teen Bahuraniyan (1968) as Sheela Devi
- Tamanna (1969)
- Shatranj (1969) as Suzie
- Rahgir (1969)
- Paisa Ya Pyar (1969) as Lakshmi
- Saas Bhi Kabhi Bahu Thi (1970) as Maya M. Chaudhary
- Humjoli (1970) as Shyama Rai
- Ghar Ghar Ki Kahani (1970) as Jamuna
- Chhoti Bahu (1971) as Paro
- Woh Din Yaad Karo (1971) as Rajkumari / Saroj
- Jawan Muhabat (1971) as Mala Das (as Shashi Kala)
- Narad Leela (1972)
- Naag Panchami (1972) as Mahadevi Mansa
- Dastaan E Kashmir (1973)
- Chhote Sarkar (1974) as Seema
- Amaanat (1977) as Sonia
- Babruvahana (1977)
- Swami (1977) as Ghanshyam's step-mother
- Duniyadari (1977) as Malti devi
- Dulhan Wahi Jo Piya Man Bhaaye (1977) as Ms. Saxena (as Sashikala)
- Dildaar (1977) as Lata's mom (as Shashi Kala)
- Hamara Sansar (1978) as Pratap's Mother
- Bin Baap Ka Beta (1979)
- Sargam (1979) as Savitri Pradhan
- Zulm Ki Pukar (1979)
- Khubsoorat (1980) as Mrs. Gupta
- Kashish (1980) as Seema's Mother
- Phir Wohi Raat (1980) as Aunty
- Yeh Kaisa Insaf? (1980) as Shanta Nath
- Swayamvar (1980) as Jwala
- Saajan Mere Main Saajan Ki (1980)
- Kranti (1981) as Charumati (Shakti's Adopted Mother)
- Rocky (1981) as Sophia
- Biwi O Biwi (1981) as Nirmala
- Ahista Ahista (1981) as Subbalaxmi
- Jyothi (1981) as Sunanda (Niranjan's mom)
- Dial 100 (1982) as Shanti
- Teri Maang Sitaron Se Bhar Doon (1982) as Anand's Mother
- Yeh To Kamaal Ho Gaya (1982)
- Samraat (1982) as Ranbir's mom
- Anokha Bandhan (1982) as Annapurna's mom
- Log Kya Kahenge (1982)
- Souten (1983) as Renu Prannath Pasha (as Shashi Kala)
- Dard-E-Dil (1983) as Shola Beghum
- Ram Tera Desh (1984) as Kanta Saxena
- Lek Chalali Sasarla (1984) as Aaisaheb
- Tawaif (1985) as Bilquis Bai (as Shashi Kala)
- Arjun (1985) as Mrs. Rukhmini Malvankar
- Mahananda (1985)
- Amma (1986) as Jiji
- Preeti (1986 film)
- Khamosh Nigahen (1986)
- Dhakti Soon (1986) as Ujwala's patron
- Dadagiri (1987) as Shanti B. Singh
- Besahara (1987) as Rakesh's Mother
- Mera Karam Mera Dharam (1987) as Mrs. Taraknath
- Ghar Ghar Ki Kahani (1988) as Mrs. Dhanraj
- Main Tere Liye (1988) as Anjana Saxena
- Sach (1989) as Mrs. Chinoy
- Salma Pe Dil Aa Gaya (1997) as Dai Maa
- Lahoo Ke Do Rang (1997) as Chachi
- Main Solah Baras Ki (1998)
- Maharaja (1998) as Ranbir's mom
- Pardesi Babu (1998) as Mai (landlady)
- Dhoondte Reh Jaaoge! (1998) as Mrs. Malhotra
- Baadshah (1999) as Raj(Baadshah)'s Mother
- Mother (1999) as Mrs. Chaudhary
- Agniputra (2000)
- Uljhan (2001) as Varun's grandma
- Kabhi Khushi Kabhie Gham (2001) as Ashfaque's grandmother
- Jhankaar Beats (2003) as Shanti's mother
- Chori Chori (2003) as Chachi
- Mujhse Shaadi Karogi (2004) as Grandma Malhotra
- Rakht (2004) as Dhristi's Grandmother
- Padmashree Laloo Prasad Yadav (2005) as South African Witness
