= Kaajal =

1965 film

- Theatrical poster
- Directed by: Ram Maheshwari
- Written by: Kidar Sharma (dialogue)
- Screenplay by: Phani Majumdar
- Story by: Gulshan Nanda
- Based on: Maadhavi by Gulshan Nanda
- Produced by: Pannalal Maheshwari
- Starring: Meena Kumari; Raaj Kumar; Dharmendra; Padmini
- Cinematography: Sudhin Majumdar
- Edited by: Keshav Nanda
- Music by: Ravi
- Production companies: Famous Cine Studios, Tardeo, Mumbai; Kalpanalok
- Release date: 1965
- Country: India
- Language: Hindi

Kaajal (lit. Kohl) is a 1965 Bollywood romance drama film produced by Pannalal Maheshwari and directed by Ram Maheshwari. The film stars Meena Kumari, Raaj Kumar, Dharmendra, Padmini, Mumtaz, Mehmood, Durga Khote, and Helen. The soundtrack was composed by music director Ravi.

The film is adapted from Gulshan Nanda's novel "Maadhavi." The screenplay was by Phani Majumdar with Kidar Sharma writing the dialogues. It was the tenth-highest-grossing film, and was listed amongst the Top 20 films of 1965. Boxofficeindia.com declared the film a "hit" at the box office. The film was remade in Telugu as Maa Inti Devatha.

== Plot ==
The clerk in Ranimaa's family lives with his son, Kaushal and daughter, Madhavi. After he dies, Ranimaa brings up both children as her own, along with her only son, Rajesh. Years later, Rajesh has grown up and is of marriageable age. He meets with the beautiful Bhanu Saxena and both fall in love with each other. Kaushal dies in a boating accident shortly after this, leaving behind a devastated Madhavi. Rajesh blames himself and Ranimaa for his death. A few months later, Rajesh marries Bhanu and she moves in with them. Bhanu dislikes Madhavi and would like her out of the way; she goes as far as accusing her of having an affair with her husband. Under pressure, Madhavi attempts to kill herself, but is rescued by a young man named Moti. Rajesh likes Moti and asks him to marry Madhavi, to which he agrees. After the marriage, Madhavi bids adieu to Ranimaa, and Rajesh, and moves in with Moti. What Madhavi does not know is that Moti had an agenda and an ulterior motive for marrying her, and it seems she has been dumped from the frying pan into the fire.

== Cast ==
- Meena Kumari as Madhavi
- Raaj Kumar as Moti
- Dharmendra as Rajesh
- Padmini as Bhanu Saxena
- Mehmood as Bhola
- Mumtaz as Jharna
- Durga Khote as Ranimaa
- Gajanan Jagirdar as Mr. Saxena
- Helen as the courtesan
- Ramayan Tiwari as Kalu Mali / Kalicharan
- Tun Tun as Amba
- Gopal Sehgal as Amba's Mama
- Sailesh Kumar as Kaushal

== Music ==
The songs of the film are penned by Sahir Ludhianvi and are composed by Ravi. Playback singers are Mohammed Rafi, Asha Bhosle and Mahendra Kapoor.

Song	Singer(s)	Raga
"Chhoo Lene Do Naazuk Honton Ko..."	Mohammed Rafi	Malkauns
"Yeh Zulf Agar Khulke..."	Mohammed Rafi	
"Kabira Nirbhay Ram Jape, Jab Lag Diye Bati..."	Mohammed Rafi, Asha Bhosle	
"Zara Si Aur Pila Do Bhang, Main Aaya Dekhne..."	Mohammed Rafi, Asha Bhosle	
"Tora Man Darpan Kehlaaye..."	Asha Bhosle	Darbari Kanada
"Mere Bhaiya, Mere Chanda..."	Asha Bhosle	
"Chham Chham Ghunghroo..."	Asha Bhosle	Malkauns
"Samjhi Thi Ke Yeh Ghar..."	Asha Bhosle	
"Yeh Haseen Zulf..."	Asha Bhosle	
"Agar Mujhe Na Mili Tum, To Main Yeh Samjhunga..."	Asha Bhosle, Mahendra Kapoor	
"Muddat Ki Tamannaon Ka..."	Mahendra Kapoor	
"Aapke Paas Jo Aayega..."	Mahendra Kapoor	

== Awards ==
13th Filmfare Awards:

Won

- Best Actress – Meena Kumari
- Best Supporting Actress – Padmini

Nominated

- Best Actor – Raaj Kumar
- Best Supporting Actor – Raaj Kumar
- Best Male Playback Singer – Mohammad Rafi for Choo Lene Do Naazuk Honton Ko
- Best Story – Gulshan Nanda
