= Achala Sachdev =

Indian actress (1920–2012)

- Achala Sachdev in Waqt (1965)
- Born: 3 May 1920; Peshawar, North-West Frontier Province, British India (present-day Pakistan)
- Died: 30 April 2012 (aged 91); Pune, Maharashtra, India
- Other name: Mother of Bollywood
- Occupation: Actress
- Years active: 1938–2012
- Notable work: Footpath; Chandni Chowk (1954); Pardesi (1957); Miss Mary (1957); Shagun (1964); Sangam (1964); Arzoo (1965); Waqt (1965); Mere Sanam (1965); Hamraaz (1967); Mera Naam Joker (1970); Chandni (1989); Dilwale Dulhania Le Jayenge (1995); Kabhi Khushi Kabhi Gham (2001)
- Spouses: Gyan Sachdev (Divorced); Clifford Douglas Peters (marriage ended by death)
- Children: Jyotin Sachdev (lives in USA)

Achala Sachdev (3 May 1920 – 30 April 2012) was an Indian actress who appeared in classic films of Hindi language film industry, who started her career as a child actor. She later became known for mother and grandmother roles in Hindi films. Her most memorable roles were as Balraj Sahni's wife in Waqt (1965) and Kajol's grandmother in Dilwale Dulhania Le Jayenge (1995).

== Early life ==
Achala Sachdev was born on 3 May 1920 in Peshawar.

== Career ==
Achala worked for All India Radio, Lahore before the partition of India, and then at Delhi All India Radio. Achala made her film debut with Fashionable Wife (1938), and acted in over 130 Hindi films. She has acted in many Yash Raj Films, starting with Yash Chopra's first production Daag: A Poem of Love (1973) and films such as Chandni (1989) and Dilwale Dulhania Le Jayenge (1995). Her other noted films were Prem Pujari, Mera Naam Joker, Hare Rama Hare Krishna and Andaz, apart from acting in English films such as the Mark Robson's Nine Hours to Rama (1963) and Merchant Ivory's The Householder (1963). However, her most noted role remains as Balraj Sahani's wife in Waqt (1965), wherein the hit song Ae Meri Zohra Jabeen was picturised on her.

== Personal life ==
Achala became a resident of Pune after marrying Clifford Douglas Peters, who had a factory in Pune's Bhosari industrial estate, named Morris Electronics, producing small electronics parts such as diodes. The factory was later sold to the Piramal Group. In an almost filmy turn, Sachdev was introduced to Peters by Yash Chopra on the sets of a film in Mumbai. Peter's first wife had died by then and Sachdev herself was a divorcee. They married. Peters, a mechanical engineer, had a factory in Bhosari and the couple lived in a bungalow in the same area for some time before shifting to Hadapsar. After Peters died, Achala lived alone. Five years before her death, she gave away her flat in Pune to the Janseva Foundation, a charitable organization, on the condition that they should take care of her as long as she lived.

In September 2011, Achala slipped and fell in her kitchen. She sustained a fracture in her leg. After that, she was diagnosed with multiple embolisms in her brain. This resulted in total paralysis and the loss of her vision.

== Selected filmography ==
- Kabhi Khushi Kabhie Gham (2001)
- Dahek (1999)
- Dil Kya Kare (1999)
- Dilwale Dulhania Le Jayenge (1995) - Simran's grandmother
- Chandni (1989)
- Love & God (1986)
- Mangal Dada (1986)
- Tumhari Kasam (1978)
- Amaanat (1977)
- Chailla Babu (1977)
- Chandi Sona (1977)
- Karm (1977)
- Vir Mangdavalo (1976, Gujarati)
- Laila Majnu (1976)
- Julie (1975)
- Trimurti (1974)
- Amar Shaheed Bhagat Singh (1974)
- Geeta Mera Naam (1974)
- Kora Kagaz (1974) – Mrs. Gupta
- Parinay (1974)
- Anamika (1973)
- Daag: A Poem of Love (1973)
- Hanste Zakhm (1973)
- Kal Aaj Aur Kal (1971)
- Paraya Dhan (1971)
- Albela (1971)
- Andaz (1971)
- Chahat (1971)
- Hare Rama Hare Krishna (1971)
- Heer Raanjha (1970)
- Nanak Dukhiya Sub Sansar (1970)
- Mera Naam Joker (1970)
- Pavitra Paapi (1970) ... Maya
- Prem Pujari (1970)
- Bandhan (1969)
- Aadmi Aur Insaan (1969)
- Sambandh (1969)
- Juari (1968)
- Kanyadaan (1968)
- Mere Hamdam Mere Dost (1968)
- Sapno Ka Saudagar (1968)
- Hamraaz (1967)
- Shagird (1967)
- Dil Ne Pukara (1967)
- Aag (1967)
- Akashdeep (1965)
- Bahu Beti (1965)
- Himalaya Ki God Mein (1965)
- Janwar (1965)
- Mere Sanam (1965)
- Waqt (1965) - Laxmi Kedarnath
- Arzoo (1965)
- Chitralekha (1964)
- Haqeeqat (1964)
- Raaj Kumar (1964)
- Sangam (1964)
- Shagun (1964)
- Dil Ek Mandir (1963)
- Meri Surat Teri Ankhen (1963)
- Manmauji (1962)
- Mehandi Lagi Mere Haath (1962)
- Jhoola (1962)
- Salam Memsaheb (1961)
- Sampoorna Ramayana (1961)
- Nazrana (1961)
- Chhote Nawab (1961)
- Shravan Kumar (1960)
- Zameen Ke Tare (1960)
- Manzil (1960)
- Kalpana (1960)
- Angulimaal (1960)
- Char Dil Char Rahen (1959)
- Adalat (1958)
- Miss Mary (1957)
- Pardesi (1957)
- Hum Panchhi Ek Daal Ke (1957)
- Bandhan (1956)
- Sabse Bada Rupaiya (1955)
- Naukri (1954)
- Munna (1954)
- Chandni Chowk (1954)
- Footpath (1953)
- Rahi (1952)
- Anhonee (1952)
- Maa (1952)
- Resham (1952)
- Sheesha (1952)
- Kashmir (1951)
- Shokiyan (1951)
- Kashmir (1951)
- Dilruba (1950)
- Fashionable Wife (1938)
