= Khandan (1965 film) =

- Directed by: A. Bhimsingh
- Screenplay by: A. Bhimsingh
- Story by: M. S. Solaimalai
- Based on: Bhaaga Pirivinai (Tamil)
- Produced by: Vasu Menon
- Starring: Sunil Dutt; Nutan; Om Prakash
- Cinematography: V. Babasaheb
- Edited by: A. Paul Doraisingham
- Music by: Ravi
- Release date: 23 September 1965; (India)
- Country: India
- Language: Hindi

Khandan (lit. 'Family') is a 1965 Indian Hindi language film directed by A. Bhimsingh. The film stars Sunil Dutt, Nutan, Pran, Om Prakash, Lalita Pawar, Helen and Mumtaz. The film's music is by Ravi. A box-office success, the film became the seventh highest earning film of 1965, earning an approximate gross of Rs. 2,80,00,000 and a net of Rs. 1,40,00,000. The film was a remake of the director's own Tamil film Bhaaga Pirivinai.

== Plot ==
Two young men, Jeevandas and Shankar inherit a substantial area of farmland on their father Ramswaroop Lal's passing. Jeevandas marries Bhagwanti, but they are childless, while Shankar marries Parvati and they have two sons, Govind and Shyam. Govind becomes paralysed in his right hand, due to an accident (electric shock). Many years in the future, Shyam leaves to become educated in the city, but on returning finds the family split in two from disagreement and bitterness; Jeevandas, Bhagwanti, Shyam, Navrangi and Neelima on one side, and Govind, his wife, Radha, Shankar and Parvati on the other. He borrows more money, this time from Shyam, to purchase an elephant. Govind and Radha soon celebrate the birth of a completely healthy baby boy, Navjeevandas Lal. Later, Navrangi intends to begin staging a show using the elephant at the carnival, where a boy is thrown from the trunk, and he intends to use Govind's son. Later, Navjeevandas is abducted by Navrangi. Govind and Radha get to the carnival and save Navjeevandas. Navrangi attacks Govind, but surprisingly, Govind is snapped out of his paralysis and fights Navrangi. Moments later, when Navrangi is about to kill Govind and Shyam, Jeevandas and the rest of the family intervenes and discovers that he started the division of their home. Later, Navrangi is arrested and Govind and Shyam tear down the wall that separates the house. In the end, Jeevandas recites a prayer with the rest of the family united.

== Cast ==
- Sunil Dutt ... Govind Shankar Lal
- Nutan ... Radha Govind Lal
- Sudesh Kumar ... Shyam Shankar Lal
- Mumtaz ... Neelima Shyam Lal
- Pran... Navrangi
- Om Prakash ... Jeevandas Lal
- Lalita Pawar ... Bhagwanti Jeevandas Lal
- Manmohan Krishna ... Shankar Lal
- Sulochana Chatterjee ... Parvati Shankar Lal
- Mohan Choti ... Manmauji
- Helen ... Jati (Dancer)
- Jeevankala ... Sati (Dancer)

== Soundtrack ==
The lyrics were written by Rajinder Krishnan and the music of the movie was composed by Ravi, which won him the Filmfare Award for Best Music Director that year.

| Song | Singer |
|---|---|
| "Tum Hi Meri Mandir, Tum Hi Meri Pooja" | Lata Mangeshkar |
| "Badi Der Bhai Nandlala Teri Raah Take Brijbala" | Mohammed Rafi |
| "Kal Chaman Tha, Aaj Ek Sehra Hua" | Mohammed Rafi |
| "Main Sunata Hoon Tujhe Ek Kahani Sunle" | Mohammed Rafi |
| "Neel Gagan Par Udte Badal, Aa Aa Aa" | Asha Bhosle, Mohammed Rafi |
| "O Ballo, Sochke Mele Jana, Sara Shehar Tera Deewana" | Asha Bhosle, Mohammed Rafi |
| "Aa Dance Karen, Thoda Romance Karen" | Asha Bhosle, Mohammed Rafi |
| "Meri Mitti Mein Mil Gayi Jawani, Haay Ram" | Asha Bhosle, Usha Mangeshkar |

== Reception ==
The film was a major hit. The performance of Sunil Dutt was highly appreciated and considered one of his career's best performances which won him Filmfare Best Actor Award.

== Awards ==
- Filmfare Best Actor Award for Sunil Dutt
- Filmfare Best Music Director Award for Ravi
- Filmfare Best Female Playback Award for Lata Mangeshkar for "Tumhi Meri Mandir"
- Filmfare Best Lyricist Award for Rajendra Krishan for "Tumhi Meri Mandir"
