= Gulshan Nanda =

Indian writer

Gulshan Nanda (1919 – 16 November 1985) born in Rawalpindi, British India was an Indian novelist and screenwriter. Many of his novels were adapted into Hindi films in the 1960s and 1970s, including more than a dozen big hits of the period — Kaajal (1965), Kati Patang (1970), Khilona (1970), Sharmeelee (1971) and Daag (1973). He frequently collaborated with Rajesh Khanna with films like Kati Patang, Daag, Ajanabee, Mehbooba and Nazrana. His stories encompassed a range of themes, from social issues and romance to action thrillers. He was nominated for the Filmfare Award for Best Story six times, for Kaajal (1965), Neel Kamal (1968), Khilona (1970), Kati Patang (1970), Naya Zamana (1971) and Mehbooba (1976). His sons Rahul (married to Rakita Chopra, daughter of actor Prem Chopra) and Himanshu Nanda are veteran publicity designers for Bollywood and conceived the concept of Akshay Kumar starrer, Patiala House (2011).

== Filmography ==
| Year | Film | Story | Screenplay | Note |
|---|---|---|---|---|
| 1964 | Phoolon Ki Sej | Yes | | Andhere Chirag novel |
| 1965 | Kaajal | Yes | | Maadhavi novel |
| 1966 | Sawan Ki Ghata | Yes | Yes | Shakthi Samanta |
| 1967 | Patthar Ke Sanam | Yes | | Novel Sanvli Raat |
| 1968 | Neel Kamal | Yes | | |
| 1970 | Khilona | Yes | | Won Filmfare Best Movie Award |
| 1971 | Kati Patang | Yes | Yes | |
| | Sharmeelee | Yes | | |
| | Naya Zamana | Yes | | |
| 1973 | Daag | Yes | | Yash Chopra debut as producer |
| | Jheel Ke Us Paar | Yes | Yes | |
| | Jugnu | Yes | | |
| | Joshila | Yes | | |
| 1974 | Ajnabee | Yes | Yes | |
| | Chhote Sarkar | Yes | Yes | Story & Screenplay |
| 1976 | Bhanwar | Yes | | |
| | Mehbooba | Yes | Yes | Sisakate Saaz novel |
| 1978 | Azaad | Yes | | |
| 1983 | Bade Dil Wala | Yes | | |
| 1984 | Bindiya Chamkegi | Yes | | |
| 1985 | Baadal | | Yes | |
| 1987 | Nazrana | Yes | | |
