= Dharmendra filmography =

Dharmendra Deol (born Kunwar Dharminder Singh Deol; 8 December 1935 - 24 November 2025) was an Indian actor, producer, and politician who is primarily known for his work in Hindi films especially of paring with Hema Malini, whom he later married. Nicknamed the "He-Man" of Bollywood, Dharmendra is widely regarded as one of the greatest, finest and most versatile actors of Hindi cinema.

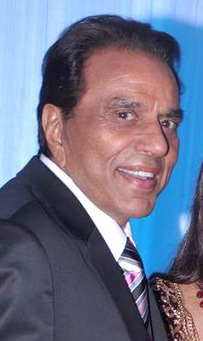
Dharmendra in 2012

== Films ==
List of film credits
Year	Title	Role	Notes	Ref.
1960	Dil Bhi Tera Hum Bhi Tere	Ashok	Debut film	
1961	Shola Aur Shabnam	Ravi (Bunnu)		
1961	Boy Friend	Sunil Singh		
1962	Soorat Aur Seerat			
1962	Anpadh	Deepak Nath		
1962	Shaadi	Ramesh Malhotra		
1963	Bandini	Dr. Devendra		
1963	Begaana	Prakash		
1964	Ayee Milan Ki Bela	Ranjit		
1964	Pooja Ke Phool	Balraj		
1964	Mera Qasoor Kya Hai	Vijay		
1964	Haqeeqat	Bahadur Singh		
1964	Ganga Ki Lahren	Ashok		
1964	Aap Ki Parchhaiyan	Chandra Mohan Chopra (Channi)		
1964	Main Bhi Ladki Hoon	Ram		
1965	Purnima	Prakash		
1965	Neela Aakash	Aakash		
1965	Kaajal	Rajesh		
1965	Chand Aur Suraj	Suraj Prakash Malik		
1965	Akashdeep	Tarun		
1966	Phool Aur Patthar	Shakti Singh (Shaka)		
1966	Mohabbat Zindagi Hai	Amar		
1966	Mamta	Indraneel		
1966	Dil Ne Phir Yaad Kiya	Ashok		
1966	Devar	Shankar Rai (Bhola)		
1966	Baharen Phir Bhi Aayengi	Jeetendra Gupta (Jeeten)		
1966	Anupama	Ashok		
1966	Aaye Din Bahar Ke	Ravi		
1966	Paari	Ghanshyam Dhali	Bengali film	
1967	Majhli Didi	Bipin Chandra		
1967	Jab Yaad Kisi Ki Aati Hai	Ravi		
1967	Ghar Ka Chirag	(Himself)	Guest appearance	
1967	Dulhan Ek Raat Ki	Ashok		
1967	Chandan Ka Palna	Ajit		
1968	Shikar	Ajay Singh		
1968	Mere Hamdam Mere Dost	Sunil		
1968	Izzat	Shekhar and Dilip Singh (dual role) (Note: Dharmendra played two characters.)		
1968	Baharon Ki Manzil	Dr. Rajesh Khanna		
1968	Ankhen	Sunil		
1968	Baazi	Ajay		
1969	Yakeen	Rajesh Varma and Garson (dual role)		
1969	Satyakam	Satyapriya Acharya (Sat)		
1969	Khamoshi	Dev Kumar (Patient #24)	Cameo	
1969	Aadmi Aur Insaan	Munish Mehra		
1969	Pyar Hi Pyar	Vijay Pratap Gupta		
1969	Aya Sawan Jhoom Ke	Jai Shankar		
1969	Dharti Kahe Pukar Ke	(Narrator)		
1969	Soldier Thakur Daler Singh	Deepak's Lawyer		
1970	Jeevan Mrityu	Ashok Tandon / Vikram Sher Singh		
1970	Tum Haseen Main Jawaan	Sunil		
1970	Sharafat	Rajesh		
1970	Mera Naam Joker	Mahendra Singh		
1970	Man Ki Aankhen	Rajesh Agarwal		
1970	Kab? Kyoon? Aur Kahan?	Anand		
1970	Ishq Par Zor Nahin	Ram Kumar		
1971	Kankan De Ole	Banta Singh	Punjabi film	
1971	Rakhwala	Deepak Kumar		
1971	Naya Zamana	Anoop		
1971	Mera Gaon Mera Desh	Ajit		
1971	Guddi	(Himself)	Guest appearance	
1971	Badnam Farishte	Narrator		
1972	Seeta Aur Geeta	Raka		
1972	Samadhi	Lakhan Singh / Jaswant Singh / Ajay		
1972	Raja Jani	Raj Kumar Singh (Raja)		
1972	Lalkar	Ram Kapoor		
1972	Do Chor	Tony		
1972	Anokha Milan	Ghanshyam Dhali (Ghana)		
1973	Loafer	Ranjit		
1973	Phagun	Gopal	Cameo	
1973	Keemat	Gopal		
1973	Jugnu	Ashok Roy (Jugnu)		
1973	Jheel Ke Us Paar	Sameer Rai		
1973	Jwar Bhata	Balraj Prasad (Billoo)		
1973	Yaadon Ki Baaraat	Shankar		
1973	Black Mail	Kailash Gupta		
1973	Kahani Kismat Ki	Ajit Sharma		
1974	Dost	Manav		
1974	Resham Ki Dori	Ajit Singh		
1974	Patthar Aur Payal	Ranjeet Singh (Chhote Thakur)		
1974	Pocketmaar	Shankar		
1974	Dukh Bhanjan Tera Naam	Bullock Cart Driver	Punjabi film	
1974	Do Sher		Punjabi film	
1974	International Crook	Shekhar		
1974	Aaina	(Himself)	Guest appearance	
1974	Kunwara Baap	(Himself)	Guest appearance	
1975	Saazish	Jai Deep		
1975	Ek Mahal Ho Sapno Ka	Vishal		
1975	Dhoti Lota Aur Chowpatty	Madman	Cameo	
1975	Chupke Chupke	Dr. Parimal Tripathi (Pyare Mohan)		
1975	Sholay	Veeru		
1975	Pratiggya	Devendra Singh / Ajit Singh		
1975	Chaitali	Manish		
1975	Apne Dushman	Brijesh	Cameo	
1975	Kahtey Hain Mujhko Raja	Balram	Cameo	
1976	Santo Banto	(Himself)	Punjabi film; Guest appearance	
1976	Chhoti Si Baat	(Himself)	Guest appearance in the song "Jaaneman Jaaneman Tere Do Nayan"	
1976	Barood	Anoop's Landlord	Cameo	
1976	Charas	Suraj Kumar		
1976	Maa	Vijay		
1977	Chacha Bhatija	Shankar Teja		
1977	Dream Girl	Anupam Verma		
1977	Kinara	Chandan Arya	Cameo	
1977	Khel Khiladi Ka	Shaki Lutera / Raja Saab / Ajit		
1977	Dharam Veer	Dharam Singh		
1977	Swami	Nautanki Dancer	Guest appearance	
1977	Charandas	Qawwali Singer	Guest appearance	
1977	Chala Murari Hero Banne	Himself	Guest appearance	
1978	Phandebaaz	Rajkumar Kakkar / Rana Shantidas		
1978	Dillagi	Swarn Kamal		
1978	Azaad	Ashok (Azaad)		
1978	Giddha	Bantoo	Punjabi film	
1978	Shalimar	S. S. Kumar		
1978	Do Chehere	Kanwar Pran (Drunkard) / S.P. Shukla		
1979	Dil Kaa Heera	Rajat Sharma		
1979	Kartavya	Vijay Kumar		
1979	Cinema Cinema	(Himself)	Guest appearance	
1980	Chunaoti	Shakti Singh	Cameo	
1980	The Burning Train	Ashok Singh		
1980	Alibaba aur 40 Chor	Alibaba		
1980	Insaaf Ka Tarazu	Anil Dev Maini	Cameo	
1980	Ram Balram	Ram		
1981	Aas Paas	Arun Choudhury		
1981	Krodhi	Vikramjit Singh (Vicky) / Acharya Shradhanand		
1981	Naseeb	Himself	Guest appearance in the Song "John Jani Janardhan"	
1981	Professor Pyarelal	Ram / Pyarelal		
1981	Khuda Kasam	Maharaja Bhunam	Cameo	
1981	Katilon Ke Kaatil	Ajit / Badshah		
1982	Rajput	Manupratap Singh (Manu)		
1982	Teesri Aankh	Ashok		
1982	Samraat	Ram		
1982	Main Intequam Loonga	Kumar Agnihotri (Bittu)		
1982	Ghazab	Ajay Singh (Munna) / Vijay Singh		
1982	Do Dishayen	Ajitesh		
1982	Baghavat	Amar Singh		
1982	Badle Ki Aag	Sher Singh (Shera) / Jaggu		
1983	Ambri	Dharam Singh		
1983	Putt Jattan De	Chaudhary Dharam Singh	Punjabi film	
1983	Andhaa Kaanoon	Truck Driver	Cameo	
1983	Naukar Biwi Ka	Deepak Kumar / Raja		
1983	Jaani Dost	Raju		
1983	Razia Sultan	Yakut Jamaluddin		
1983	Qayamat	Shyam / Rajeshwar		
1983	Film Hi Film	Himself	Guest appearance	
1984	Baazi	Inspector Ajay Sharma		
1984	Ranjhan Mera Yaar	N/A	Punjabi film	
1984	Dharam Aur Qanoon	Rahim Khan		
1984	Raaj Tilak	Zoravar Singh		
1984	Sunny	Indrajeet	Cameo	
1984	Jeene Nahi Doonga	Roshan / Raka		
1984	Jagir	Shankar		
1984	Jhutha Sach	Vijay / Tiger		
1984	The Gold Medal	Labor Leader Acharya	Cameo	
1985	Sitamgar	Sonu / Shankar		
1985	Ghulami	Ranjit Singh		
1985	Karishma Kudrat Kaa	Vijay / Karan		
1986	Saveray Wali Gaadi	Sher Singh	Cameo	
1986	Mohabbat Ki Kasam	Shop Owner	Cameo	
1986	Begaana	Kailashnath Rana	Cameo	
1986	Main Balwan	Chaudhary		
1986	Sultanat	Khalid		
1987	Insaniyat Ke Dushman	Shekhar Kapoor		
1987	Loha	Amar		
1987	Dadagiri	Dharma		
1987	Hukumat	Arjun Singh		
1987	Aag Hi Aag	Bahadur Singh / Sher Singh		
1987	Mera Karam Mera Dharam	Ajay Shankar Sharma		
1987	Watan Ke Rakhwale	Mahaveer		
1987	Insaaf Kaun Karega	Veerendra (Veeru)		
1987	Mard Ki Zabaan	Laxman Chauhan		
1987	Insaaf Ki Pukar	Vijay Singh		
1987	Superman	Jor-El	Cameo	
1987	Jaan Hatheli Pe	Soni Kapoor		
1988	Zalzala	Shiv Kumar		
1988	Soorma Bhopali	Mahendra Singh / Himself	Cameo	
1988	Sone Pe Suhaaga	Ashwini Kumar / Vikram		
1988	Khatron Ke Khiladi	Balwant / Karamveer / Teesri Adalat		
1988	Mardon Wali Baat	Yadvinder Singh		
1988	Mahaveera	Ajay Verma		
1988	Paap Ko Jalaa Kar Raakh Kar Doonga	Shankar Saxena		
1988	Ganga Tere Desh Mein	Vijay Nath		
1989	Sachai Ki Taqat	Ram Singh		
1989	Vardi	Bhagwan Singh	Cameo	
1989	Nafrat Ki Aandhi	Sonu		
1989	Hathyar	Khushal Khan		
1989	Kasam Suhaag Ki	Thakur Sultan Singh		
1989	Ilaaka	Dharam Verma	Cameo	
1989	Batwara	Sumer Singh		
1989	Elaan-E-Jung	Arjun Singh		
1989	Sikka	Vijay		
1989	Shehzaade	Zorawar Singh / Shankar Shrivastav		
1990	Veeru Dada	Veeru		
1990	Sherdil	Prakash Saxena / Avinash Saxena / Shera		
1990	Qurbani Jatt Di	Sucha Singh	Cameo	
1990	Kanoon Ki Zanjeer	Ajay Kapoor		
1990	Pyar Ka Karz	Shekhar (Shaka)		
1990	Naakabandi	Veer Singh (Veera)		
1990	Humse Na Takrana	Amar		
1991	Trinetra	Raja	Cameo	
1991	Mast Kalandar	Shankar		
1991	Kohraam	Arjun		
1991	Farishtay	Virendra Kumar (Veeru)		
1991	Paap Ki Aandhi	Dharma / Mangal		
1991	Dushman Devta	Shiva		
1992	Khule-Aam	Shiva		
1992	Zulm Ki Hukumat	Pitamber Kohli		
1992	Waqt Ka Badshah	Ashok		
1992	Tahalka	Dharam Singh		
1992	Virodhi	Inspector Shekhar		
1992	Humlaa	Bhawani		
1992	Kal Ki Awaz	Ali Haider Jaffrey		
1993	Aag Ka Toofan	Dharam Singh / Arjun Singh		
1993	Kundan	Kundan Singh		
1993	Kshatriya	Prithvi Singh		
1994	Maha Shaktishaali	Jaswant Singh (Jassi)		
1994	Juaari	Dharam Singh		
1994	Rakhwale	Ashok		
1995	Policewala Gunda	Ajit Singh		
1995	Maidan-E-Jung	Shankar		
1995	Aazmayish	Shankar Singh Rathod		
1995	Taaqat	Shakti Singh		
1995	Hum Sab Chor Hain	Vijay Kumar		
1995	Fauji	Shamsher Singh (Sheroo)		
1995	Veer	Veer / Ram		
1996	Smuggler	Ajit Singh		
1996	Return of Jewel Thief	Surya Dev Singh		
1996	Himmatvar	Sultan		
1996	Aatank	Jesu		
1996	Mafia	Ajit Singh		
1997	Loha	Shankar		
1997	Jeeo Shaan Se	Brahma / Vishnu / Mahesh (Note: Dharmendra played three characters.)		
1997	Gundagardi	Karan Singh		
1997	Agnee Morcha	Kishan Singh Bhatti		
1998	Pyaar Kiya To Darna Kya	Thakur Ajay Singh		
1998	Zulm O Situm	Arun		
1999	Nyaydaata	Ram		
1999	Munnibai	Sher Singh		
1999	Lohpurush	Ajit Singh		
2000	Sultaan	Sultan Singh	Cameo	
2000	The Revenge: Geeta Mera Naam	Baba Thakur		
2000	Meri Jung Ka Elaan	Ajit Singh		
2000	Kaali Ki Saugandh	Sultan Singh		
2000	Jallad No. 1	Shankar		
2000	Bhai Thakur	N/A		
2001	Jagira	N/A		
2001	Saugandh Geeta Ki	N/A		
2001	Zakhmi Sherni	N/A		
2001	Bhooka Sher	Ranbir Singh		
2002	Reshma Aur Sultan	N/A		
2002	Border Kashmir Ka	N/A		
2003	Kaise Kahoon Ke... Pyaar Hai	Dharam		
2003	Tada	Balraj Singh Rana		
2004	Sabse Badi Ganga Ki Saugandh	N/A		
2004	Hum Kaun Hai?	Veerendra (Veeru)	Cameo	
2004	Kis Kis Ki Kismat	Hasmukh Mehta		
2007	Life in a... Metro	Amol		
2007	Apne	Baldev Singh Chaudhary		
2007	Johnny Gaddaar	Sheshadri		
2007	Om Shanti Om	(Himself)	Guest appearance in the song "Deewangi Deewangi"	
2011	Yamla Pagla Deewana	Dharam Singh Dhillon		
2011	Tell Me O Kkhuda	Tony Costello		
2013	Yamla Pagla Deewana 2	Dharam Singh Dhillon		
2013	Singh Saab the Great	(Himself)	Guest appearance in the song "Daru Band Kal Se"	
2014	Double Di Trouble	Ajit / Manjit	Punjabi film	
2015	Second Hand Husband	Ajit Singh		
2017	Jora 10 Numbaria	Jagga	Punjabi film	
2018	Yamla Pagla Deewana: Phir Se	Jaywant Parmar		
2020	Shimla Mirchi	Foreign Minister	Cameo	
2020	Jora: The Second Chapter	Jagga	Punjabi film	
2021	Dream Catcher	N/A	Short film	
2022	Khalli Balli	Professor		
2023	Rocky Aur Rani Kii Prem Kahaani	Kanwal Randhawa		
2024	Teri Baaton Mein Aisa Uljha Jiya	Jai Singh Agnihotri		
2024	Desh Ke Gaddar	N/A		
2026	Ikkis	Madan Lal Khetarpal	Last film, Posthumous release	

== Television ==
Year	Title	Role	Note(s)	Ref.
2011	India's Got Talent	(Himself)	Judge; reality show	
2023	Taj: Divided by Blood	Salim Chishti		
2024	Showtime	Himself	Cameo	
2024	Angry Young Men	Himself	Documentary	
