= Kalyanji–Anandji discography =

Kalyanji–Anandji were an Indian composer duo, consisting of Kalyanji Virji Shah (30 June 1928 – 24 August 2000) and his brother Anandji Virji Shah (born 2 March 1933). In a career spanning over 40 years, they composed music for about 250 films, working with many well-known filmmakers and singers.

== Discography ==
Year	Film	Notes
1956	Bajrangbali	
1959	Satta Bazaar	
1959	Madari	
1959	Ghar Ghar Ki Baat	
1960	Dil Bhi Tera Hum Bhi Tere	
1960	Chhalia	
1961	Payaase Panchhi	
1961	Passport	
1962	Mehndi Lagi Mere Haath	
1963	Phool Bane Angaare	
1963	Bluff Master	
1964	Jee Chahta Hai	
1964	Ishaara	
1964	Dulha Dulhan	
1964	Majboor	
1965	Saheli	
1965	Purnima	
1965	Jab Jab Phool Khile	
1965	Himalay Ki God Mein	
1965	Johar Mehmood In Goa	
1966	Preet Na Jane Reet	
1966	Johar in Kashmir	
1967	Upkar	
1967	Raaz	
1967	Dil Ne Pukara	
1967	Aamne Samne	
1968	Teen Bahuraniyan	
1968	Suhaag Raat	
1968	Saraswatichandra	
1968	Parivar	
1968	Juaari	
1968	Haseena Maan Jayegi	
1968	Baazi	
1969	Vishwas	
1969	Tamanna	
1969	Raja Saab	
1969	Nanha Farishta	
1969	Mahal	
1969	Ek Shrimaan Ek Shrimati	
1969	Bandhan	
1970	Yaadgaar	
1970	Gopi	
1970	Safar	
1970	Purab Aur Paschim	
1970	Priya	
1970	Mere Humsafar	
1970	Holi Ayee Re	
1970	Ghar Ghar Ki Kahani	
1970	Geet	
1970	Aansoo Aur Muskan	
1970	Sachaa Jhutha	
1970	Kab? Kyoon? Aur Kahan?	
1970	Johny Mera Naam	
1971	Preet Ki Dori	
1971	Paras	
1971	Maryada	
1971	Kathputli	
1971	Kangan	
1971	Johar Mehmood in Hong Kong	
1971	Hum Tum Aur Woh	
1971	Upaasna	
1971	Chhoti Bahu	
1971	Rakhwala	
1972	Maalik	
1972	Janwar Aur Insaan	
1972	Hari Darshan	
1972	Ek Hasina Do Diwane	
1972	Apradh	
1972	Lalkaar	
1972	Joroo Ka Ghulam	
1972	Victoria No. 203	
1973	Samjhauta	
1973	Kashmakash	
1973	Kahani Kismat Ki	
1973	Heera	
1973	Ghulam Begam Badshah	
1973	Ek Kunwari Ek Kunwara	
1973	Black Mail	
1973	Agni Rekha	
1973	Banarasi Babu	
1973	Zanjeer	
1974	Vachan	
1974	Paap Aur Punya	
1974	Humrahi	
1974	Har Har Mahadev	
1974	Anjaan Raahen	
1974	Albeli	
1974	Kora Kagaz	
1974	Kasauti	
1974	5 Rifles	
1974	Patthar Aur Payal	
1974	Haath Ki Safai	
1975	Zorro	
1975	Uljhan	
1975	Himalay Se Ooncha	
1975	Apne Dushman	
1975	Anokha	
1975	Rafoo Chakkar	
1975	Dharmatma	
1975	Chori Mera Kaam	
1975	Faraar	
1976	Shankar Shambhu	
1976	Rangila Ratan	
1976	Lagaaam	
1976	Ek Se Badhkar Ek	
1976	Do Anjaane	
1976	Bhoola Bhatka	
1976	Bajrangbali	
1976	Bairaag	
1976	Adalat	
1976	Kalicharan	
1976	Khaan Dost	
1976	Hera Pheri	
1976	Kabeela	
1977	Yaaron Ka Yaar	
1977	Naami Chor	
1977	Kasum Khoon Ki	
1977	Kalabaaz	
1977	Farishta Ya Qatil	
1977	Chakkar Pe Chakkar	
1977	Aakhri Goli	
1977	Khoon Pasina	
1977	Khel Khilari Ka	
1977	Hira Aur Patthar	
1977	Hatyara	
1978	Rahu Ketu	
1978	Karmayogi	
1978	Besharam	
1978	Atithee	
1978	Anjaam	
1978	Nasbandi	
1978	Ganga Ki Saugand	
1978	Aakhri Daku	
1978	Don	
1978	Anjane Mein	
1978	Do Musafir	
1978	Trishna	
1978	Muqaddar Ka Sikandar	
1978	Chor Ke Ghar Chor	
1979	Bagula Bhagat	
1979	Guru Ho Jaa Shuru	
1979	Ahisma	
1980	Sau Din Saas Ke	
1980	Bombay 405 Miles	
1980	Kashish	
1980	Qurbani	
1980	Neeyat	
1980	Jwalamukhi	
1981	Professor Pyarelal	
1981	Katilon Ke Kaatil	
1981	Lawaaris	
1981	Itni Si Baat	
1981	Yeh Rishta Na Tootay	
1981	Commander	
1981	Khoon Ka Rishta	
1982	Log Kya Kahenge	
1982	Do Guru	
1982	Raj Mahal	
1982	Vidhaata	
1983	Haadsaa	
1983	Taqdeer	
1983	Nastik	
1983	Ghungroo	
1983	Kalaakaar	
1984	Raaj Tilak	
1985	Karishma Kudrat Kaa	
1985	Ek Chitthi Pyar Bhari	
1985	Pighalta Aasman	
1985	Yudh	
1986	Baat Ban Jaye	
1986	Chameli Ki Shaadi	
1986	Sultanat	
1986	Pahunchey Huwe Log	
1986	Janbaaz	
1986	Nasihat	
1987	Imaandaar	
1987	Jhanjhaar	
1987	Kalyug Aur Ramayan	
1987	Hiraasat	
1987	Thikana	
1988	Saazish	
1988	Falak	
1988	Mohabbat Ke Dushman	
1988	Rukhsat	
1988	Mahaveera	
1989	Galiyon Ka Badshah	
1989	Daata	
1989	Tridev	
1989	Jaadugar	
1990	Pyaar Ka Toofan	
1990	C.I.D.	
1991	Iraada	
1991	Ghar Parivaar	
1991	Naya Zaher	
1991	Pratigyabadh	
1991	Kaun Kare Kurbanie	
1991	Dharam Sankat	
1992	Yalgaar	Only for the song "Hain Dil Mein Lagan"
1994	Saboot Mangta Hain Kanoon	
1994	Ulfat Ki Nayee Manzilen	

== Remixed/Recreated songs ==
2013	Boss	re-created "Har Kisi Ko" from Jaanbaaz

== See also ==
- Kalyanji–Anandji
