= Kaun Kare Kurbanie =

- Promotional Poster
- Directed by: Arjun Hingorani
- Produced by: Arjun Hingorani
- Starring: Dharmendra; Govinda; Anita Raj
- Cinematography: B. Gupta
- Edited by: Wamanrao
- Music by: Kalyanji Anandji
- Release date: 19 August 1991 (India)
- Country: India
- Language: Hindi

Kaun Kare Kurbanie is a 1991 Indian Hindi-language action thriller film directed by Arjun Hingorani. The film stars Dharmendra, Govinda, Anita Raj, Hemant Birje and Parijat in the lead roles. Arjun Hingorani also features as the primary antagonist. It was Hingorani's seventh collaboration with Dharmendra after Dil Bhi Tera Hum Bhi Tere (1960), Kab?Kyoon? Aur Kahan? (1970), Kahani Kismat Ki (1973), Khel Khiladi Ka (1977), Katilon Ka Katil (1981) and Karishma Kudrat Ka (1985). The story revolves an upright cop who is pursuing a relentless criminal involved in several cases of rape and murder.

Kaun Kare Kurbani released on 19 August 1991.

== Cast ==
- Dharmendra as Police Inspector Arjun Singh
- Govinda as Ajit "Munna" Singh
- Anita Raj as Anita A. Singh
- Hemant Birje as Hemant
- Parijat as Priti "Guddi"
- Sonika Gill as Sonia
- Arjun Hingorani as Laxmichand
- Biswajeet as Police Commissioner
- Deepak Tijori as Deepak
- Bhavna Balsavar as Laxmichand Fake Daughter
- Tej Sapru as Tej Singh

== Songs ==
1. "Hoga Na Hoga" (Part 1) - Sadhana Sargam
2. "Hoga Na Hoga" (Part 2) - Sadhana Sargam, Sonali Bajpai
3. "Hoga Na Hoga" (Part 3) - Suresh Wadkar, Sadhana Sargam
4. "Anu Menu I Love You" - Sadhana Sargam, Alka Yagnik, Suresh Wadkar
5. "Hoga Na Hoga" (Part 4) - Suresh Wadkar
6. "Tere Hatho Ne Chhua" - Suresh Wadkar
7. "Tu Meri Laila Mai Tera Chaila" - Kajal, Sadhana Sargam, Kumar Sanu
