= Kahani Kismat Ki =

- Poster
- Directed by: Arjun Hingorani
- Written by: K. A. Narayan (Story); Arjun Hingorani (Screenplay); S. M. Abbas (Dialogues)
- Produced by: Arjun Hingorani
- Starring: Dharmendra; Rekha; Ajit
- Cinematography: Kishore Rege
- Edited by: Anant Apte
- Music by: Kalyanji–Anandji
- Production company: Kapleshwar Films
- Release date: 21 December 1973
- Running time: 130 minutes
- Country: India
- Language: Hindi
- Budget: ₹85 lakh
- Box office: ₹6.47 crore

Kahani Kismat Ki (transl. The Story of Destiny) is a 1973 Hindi-language action crime film produced and directed by Arjun Hingorani. It stars Dharmendra, Rekha and Ajit in key roles. The music was composed by Kalyanji–Anandji, while cinematography and editing were handled by Kishore Rege and Anand Apte, respectively.

Kahani Kismat Ki was the third collaboration between Dharmendra and Arjun Hingorani after Dil Bhi Tera Hum Bhi Tere (1960) and Kab? Kyoon? Aur Kahan? (1970). Part of the film's plot is loosely inspired by the American film Zig Zag (1970), which was later re-used in another Hindi film Majboor (1974).

== Synopsis ==
Ajit Sharma and his father are robbers. One day, while in a heist, his father is shot and he is arrested by the police and sentenced to two years in jail. After he completes his sentence, he decides to be honest and seek employment, but without any success. Then one day he wins some money after beating a wrestler. He decides to buy some necessities for his family. Which consists of a school bag. When Gopuram opens the bag, he finds it filled with cash. The family is enraged that Ajit has obtained these funds through crime, but Ajit defends himself, finds out who the owner (Premchand) is, and returns the money to him. A gratified Premchand employs Ajit with a generous remuneration. Ajit meets with Premchand's daughter, Rekha, and they fall in love. They would like to get married. Before that could happen, a woman comes forward claiming that Ajit is her husband, and is also the father of a child; the police arrest Ajit for the murder of a man named Karamchand. As a result, Premchand fires him from employment, his family will have nothing to do with him, and Ajit must now come to terms that he may face the death penalty.

== Cast ==
- Dharmendra as Ajit Sharma
- Rekha as Rekha
- Ajit as Premchand
- Rajendranath as Gopuram Sharma
- Jayshree T. as Chanda
- Sulochana Latkar as Laxmi Sharma
- Bharat Bhushan as Doctor
- Abhi Bhattacharya as Mr. Sharma
- M. B. Shetty as Jaggu
- Yunus Parvez as Chanda's Father
- Arjun Hingorani as Karamchand
- Leena Das as Dancer / Singer

== Production ==
Prakash Mehra bought story idea for the film from the well known writer K. A. Narayan. Dharmendra liked the subject and asked him to give it to his godfather in the film industry, Arjun Hingorani. In return, he agreed to star in Zanjeer, though he could not do it due to familial reasons and the role went to Amitabh Bachchan, who rose to stardom with that film.

== Soundtrack ==
The film's soundtrack was composed by Kalyanji–Anandji, with lyrics for all the songs written by Rajendra Krishan. The song "Are Rafta Rafta Dekho" was recreated in the 2018 film Yamla Pagla Deewana: Phir Se.

- Are Rafta Rafta Dekho was listed at #5 on Binaca Geetmala annual list 1974

Song	Singer
"Are Rafta Rafta Dekho"	Kishore Kumar
"Duniya Mujhse Kehti Hai"	Kishore Kumar
"Kahani Kismat Ki" (Main)	Mukesh
"Kahani Kismat Ki" (Short)	Mukesh
"Kab Tak Na Dogi Dil, Kab Tak"	Asha Bhosle
"Tu Yaar Mera, Dildaar Mera"	Asha Bhosle

== Reception ==
Released at the peak of Dharmendra's craze, Kahani Kismat Ki was a superhit and one of the seven successful films delivered by him in the year 1973. The film alongwith Dharma, which released the same year, was instrumental in making Rekha a star after years of struggle. It was also the second consecutive hit for the actor-director duo of Dharmendra and Arjun Hingorani, who went on to make three more films with the title having three words starting with the alphabet "K", such as Khel Khilari Ka (1977), Kaatilon Ke Kaatil (1981) and Kaun Kare Kurbanie (1991).

Vijay Lokapally of The Hindu newspaper in his review of the film in 2015 wrote "Dharmendra's range was so prominently visible in Kahani Kismat Ki where he played the thief, wrestler, doting son, passionate lover and the perfect hero who would bash up an army of goons. Adept at playing such roles with comfort, Dharmendra obviously dominated the film with Rekha as his partner, looking ravishing in her part as the daughter of a businessman".
