= Marutirao Parab =

Indian actor and director

- Born: Marutirao Ganpatrao Parab
- Other names: Maruti, Maruti Rao
- Occupation: Actor
- Spouse: Kamal (Kaneez Fatima)
- Children: 3, including Guddi Maruti

Marutirao Parab, popularly known simply as Maruti, was an Indian actor and director best known for playing comic roles in Hindi films.

== Personal life ==
Parab was married to Kamal - a small time star in Hindi films who appeared in movies like Dashera (1956), Tatar Ka Chor (1955), Garma Garam (1957), Darbar (1955), Riyasat (1955) etc.

== Career ==
Parab was best known for Kahin Aar Kahin Paar (1971), Hum Sab Ustad Hain (1965) and Khaan Dost (1976). He directed films like Hum Sab Ustad Hain, Hum Sab Chor Hain, Baghi Shahzada (1964) and the Joy Mukherjee starrer - Kahin Aar Kahin Paar.

== Legacy ==
One of his daughters, Guddi Maruti, is an Indian actress best known for her comedy roles on TV and Bollywood movies.

== Partial filmography ==
=== As actor ===
- 1948 Gajre
- 1948 Satyavan Savitri
- 1950 Dilruba
- 1951 Albela
- 1951 Pyar Ki Baten
- 1953 Chacha Chowdhury
- 1953 Foot Path
- 1953 Papi
- 1954 Alibaba and 40 Thieves
- 1954 Laadla
- 1954 Lal Pari
- 1954 Radha Krishna
- 1954 Tilottama
- 1955 Alladin Ka Beta
- 1955 Baap Re Baap
- 1955 Baghdad Ka Chor
- 1955 Chirag-e-Cheen
- 1955 Hatimtai Ki Beti
- 1955 Khandaan
- 1955 Mast Qalandar
- 1955 Naqab
- 1955 Oot Patang
- 1955 Patit Pawan
- 1955 Ratna Manjari
- 1955 Son of Ali Baba
- 1955 Tatar Ka Chor
- 1955 Yasmin
- 1956 Aawaz
- 1956 Chori Chori
- 1956 Harihar Bhakti
- 1956 Panna
- 1956 Roop Kumari
- 1956 Sajani
- 1956 Sajni
- 1956 Sudarshan Chakra
- 1956 Taj Aur Talwar
- 1956 Talwar Ka Dhani
- 1956 Yahudi Ki Beti
- 1957 Hill Station
- 1957 Hum Panchhi Ek Daal Ke
- 1957 Inspector
- 1957 Jahazi Lutera
- 1957 Jannat
- 1957 Khuda Ka Banda
- 1957 Miss Mary
- 1957 Naag Padmani
- 1958 Akash Pari
- 1958 Chaubees Ghante
- 1958 Daughter of Sindbad
- 1958 Night Club
- 1959 Bhakt Pralhad
- 1959 Bus Conductor
- 1959 Commander
- 1959 Guest House
- 1959 Jagga Daku
- 1959 Kya Yeh Bombai Hai
- 1959 Main Nashe Men Hoon
- 1960 Alamara Ki Beti
- 1960 Chand Mere Aja
- 1960 Chandramukhi
- 1961 Walait Pass (Punjabi movie)
- 1961 Apsara
- 1961 Boy Friend
- 1961 Opera House
- 1961 Reshmi Rumal
- 1961 Sampoorna Ramayana
- 1962 Kala Samundar
- 1962 Naqli Nawab
- 1962 Vallah Kya Baat Hai
- 1963 Cobra Girl
- 1963 Ek Tha Alibaba
- 1963 Meri Surat Teri Ankhen
- 1963 Parasmani
- 1963 Zingaro
- 1964 Aaya Toofan
- 1964 Baghi Shahzada
- 1964 Daal Me Kala
- 1964 Hercules
- 1964 Idd Ka Chand
- 1964 Main Jatti Punjab Di (Punjabi movie)
- 1964 Tere Dwaar Khada Bhagwan
- 1965 Faraar
- 1965 Hum Diwane
- 1965 Hum Sab Ustad Hain
- 1965 Lootera
- 1965 Mahabharat
- 1965 Rustom-e-Hind
- 1965 Sab Ka Ustad
- 1965 Sangram
- 1965 Son of Hatimtai
- 1965 Teen Sardar
- 1966 Aakhri Khat
- 1966 Bahadur Daku
- 1966 Chhota Bhai
- 1966 Husn Ka Ghulam
- 1966 Sher-e-Afghan
- 1967 Hum Do Daku
- 1967 Majhli Didi
- 1967 Shamsheer
- 1968 Fareb
- 1968 Raja Aur Runk
- 1968 Watan Se Door
- 1969 Apna Khoon Apna Dushman
- 1969 Bank Robbery
- 1969 Beqasoor
- 1969 Do Bhai
- 1969 Nannha Farishta
- 1969 Raate Ke Andhere Mein
- 1969 The Thief of Baghdad
- 1969 Ustad 420
- 1970 Aansoo Aur Muskan
- 1970 Ghar Ghar Ki Kahani
- 1970 Mangu Dada
- 1970 Mera Naam Joker
- 1971 Preet Ki Dori
- 1972 Shiv Bhakat Baba Balak Nath
- 1972 Shor
- 1973 Banarasi Babu
- 1973 Door Nahin Manzil
- 1973 Ek Nari Do Roop
- 1973 Heera Panna
- 1973 Hum Sab Chor Hain
- 1973 Keemat
- 1973 Mera Desh Mera Dharam
- 1973 Naag Mere Saathi
- 1973 Sabak
- 1974 Albeli
- 1974 Badhti Ka Naam Dadhi
- 1974 Dost
- 1974 Hanuman Vijay
- 1974 Ishq Ishq Ishq
- 1974 Kunwara Baap
- 1974 Pran Jaye Par Vachan Na Jaye
- 1974 Thokar
- 1974 Zehreela Insaan
- 1975 Anokha
- 1975 Chori Mera Kaam
- 1975 Kaala Sona
- 1975 Pratiggya
- 1975 Rani Aur Lalpari
- 1976 Aadalat
- 1976 Gumrah
- 1976 Khaan Dost
- 1976 Nagin
- 1977 Aadmi Sadak Ka
- 1977 Agar... If
- 1977 Chaalu Mera Naam
- 1977 Chakkar Pe Chakkar
- 1977 Charandas
- 1977 Daku Aur Mahatma
- 1977 Dildaar
- 1977 Do Chehere
- 1977 Ek Hi Raasta
- 1977 Kalabaaz
- 1977 Khel Khilari Ka
- 1977 Saheb Bahadur
- 1977 Tinku
- 1977 Yaaron Ka Yaar
- 1978 Anpadh
- 1978 Bhola Bhala
- 1978 Chor Ke Ghar Chor
- 1978 Damaad
- 1978 Don
- 1978 Ek Baap Chhe Bete
- 1979 Guru Ho Jaa Shuru
- 1979 Jaani Dushman
- 1979 Naya Bakra
- 1979 Shabhash Daddy
- 1980 Hum Nahin Sudhrenge
- 1980 Chunaoti
- 1980 Saboot
- 1980 Shaan
- 1981 Plot No. 5
- 1981 Professor Pyarelal
- 1983 Karate
- 1983 Paanchwin Manzil

=== As director ===
- 1965 Hum Sab Ustad Hain
- 1970 Mangu Dada
- 1971 Kahin Aar Kahin Paar
- 1973 Hum Sab Chor Hain

=== As writer ===
- 1959 Bus Conductor
- 1965 Hum Sab Ustad Hain (scenario)
