= Syed Fazle Imam Rizvi =

Indian scholar, writer, critic, and poet (1940–2020)

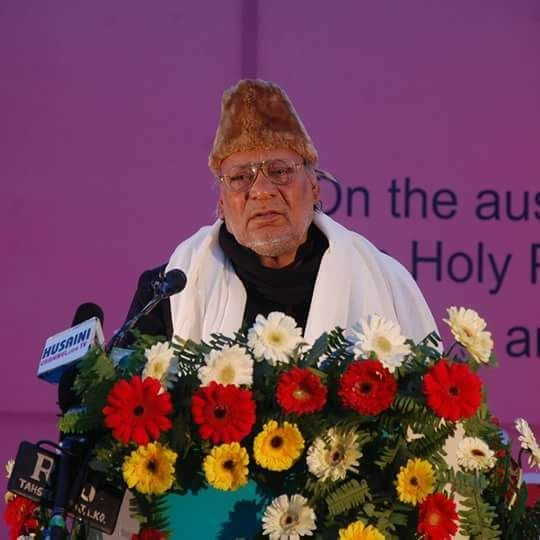
- Addressing a seminar
- Born: 7 August 1940; Azamgarh, Uttar Pradesh, United Provinces of Agra and Oudh, British India
- Died: 30 August 2020 (aged 80); Lucknow, Uttar Pradesh, India
- Occupations: Poet, writer, scholar, teacher, professor, educationist, Socialist

Academic background
- Education: Ph.D, D.Litt in Urdu Gorakhpur University; Munshi Kamil in Persian; Viddyavachaspati in Hindi
- Influences: fazle imam rizvi considered Professor Mehmood Elahi as his 'ustad'(mentor)

Academic work
- Institutions: Head Department of Urdu & Persian, University of Rajasthan; Head Department of Urdu,University of Allahabad; Chief Proctor University of Allahabad; Chairman Uttar Pradesh Secondary Education Service Selection Board
- Main interests: National Integration, Educational & Cultural, Comparative literature
- Influenced: Urdu poetry, Progressive Writers' Movement
- Writing career
- Pen name: Dr Fazle Imam Rizvi
- Subjects: Criticism , philosophy, Revolution, socialism, literature
- Movement: Active Member of Progressive Writers' Association

Professor Syed Fazle Imam Rizvi commonly known as Fazle Imam (1 August 1940 – 31 August 2020) was an Indian Urdu scholar, poet, writer and teacher at University. He is known for his literature expertise in various languages Urdu, Hindi, Sanskrit, Arabic, Persian, Bhojpuri, Rajasthani. He has written books, ghazals, and nazms, articles in Urdu, Hindi, Bhojpuri, Rajasthani.

== Family background, early life, and education ==
Fazle Imam Rizvi was born on 1 August 1940 in a village in Azamgarh district, which is now in Uttar Pradesh. He belonged to a family of landlords. His father, Late Mr. Syed Mushtaq Husain, was a freedom fighter, and his mother, Khursheedun Nisa, took care of him. He was the only son in the family. After completing his secondary education at Shahganj Public School in Shahganj of the Jaunpur district, he moved out for higher education. His father wanted him to get into engineering and join a government job but Fazle Imam had a greater interest in the field of Literature and wanted to shape his career in the same field. He did his Ph.D. (Doctorate) from Gorakhpur University and is also a First-Person who did (D, Litt) from the same university. After completing his research under the supervision of Professor Mehmood Elahi Mehmmod, Elahi became head of the department and later became the vice-chancellor of the university. Fazle Imam later became a lecturer and an assistant professor at various degree colleges and universities.

== Career and contributions in literature ==
His contributions in the field of Literature and Arts are incredible. He has written more than 75 books in various languages like Urdu, Hindi, Bhojpuri and Rajasthani. In 1972, he joined the Department of Urdu and became Head of both Urdu and Persian at the University of Rajasthan, Jaipur till 1986. Later, he joined the University of Allahabad and became the Urdu Department, Chief proctor, warden, librarian and was also appointed as the chairman of Uttar Pradesh Secondary Education Service Commission. He retired from the same university in 2006.

== Major works ==
- Has written and edited More than 75 Books
- Editor of many magazines
- More than 40 research scholars did their Ph.D. under his supervision
- More than 55 years of teaching experience
- Around 800 articles, papers on criticism and research management
- Review articles on social and current issues
- Thesis on Amirullah Tasleem "Hayat aur Shairi"
- Bhojpuri Adab Ka Taaruf
- Masanvi Khaanjre-Ishque- tasleem
- Anees Shinasi
- Jadeed Hindi Shairi -SAMT-O- RAFTAR
- The first book on poet Josh Malihabadi Shaire- akhruzzaman
- Tanqeedicriticism meyar
- Jadeed Urdu Tanqeed aur Ehtishyam Husain
- Intekhabe Kalame Josh Haryana Urdu Akademi

== Awards and honors ==
- Anees Award Urdu Academy, Uttar Pradesh
- Nawae Meer by All India Meer Academy
- Bhojpuri Bhaskar by Akhil Bhartiya Bhojpuri Parishad
- Sahitya Vibhushan by Bhasha Sangam Bhopal
- Bihar Urdu Academy
- West Bengal Urdu Academy
- Awarded Vidhya Vachaspati Hindi Sahitya Sammelan Allahabad
