= Majboor =

Majboor may refer to:

- Majboor (1964 film), an Indian drama film
- Majboor (1974 film), an Indian crime thriller film
- Majboor (1990 film), an Indian action film
