= Baghi Shahzada =

Baghi Shahazada
- Directed by: Marutirao Parab
- Starring: Kishore Kumar; Kumkum
- Music by: Bipin Dutta
- Release date: 1964
- Country: India
- Language: Hindi

Baghi Shahzada is a 1964 Indian Hindi-language film directed by Marutirao Parab. Its music was composed by Bipin Dutta. The film stars Kishore Kumar and Kumkum in lead roles, while Anwar Hussain appears as the "side-hero".

Baghi Shahzada featured Kishore Kumar as a Robin Hood-like character. The film premiered in Bombay in May 1964. It was poorly received, although it is noted for its soundtrack which includes the duet "Main Is Masoom Chehre Ko", sung by Mohammed Rafi (for Kumar) and Suman Kalyanpur.

== Cast ==
- Kishore Kumar
- Kumkum
- Marutirao Parab
- Anwar Hussain
- B. M. Vyas
- W. M. Khan
