= Ek Bechara =

- Poster
- Directed by: S. M. Abbas
- Written by: S. M. Abbas
- Produced by: B. N. Ghosh
- Starring: Jeetendra; Rekha; Vinod Khanna
- Cinematography: N. Satyen
- Edited by: K. H. Mayekar
- Music by: Laxmikant-Pyarelal
- Production company: SR International Productions
- Release date: 10 March 1972
- Running time: 131 minutes
- Country: India
- Language: Hindi

Ek Bechara (transl. One Wretch) is a 1972 Hindi-language action drama film, produced by B. N. Ghosh under the SR International Productions banner and directed by S. M. Abbas. It stars Jeetendra, Rekha, Vinod Khanna in the pivotal roles and music composed by Laxmikant-Pyarelal.

== Plot ==
Rajan is a village buffoon and his father, who is on his deathbed, lets his son go and meet Rai Bahadur Mohan, who lives in the city, who might be able to help him act with some work. After his father dies, Rajan comes to the city and finds Mohan's place. At first, he has been turned away but he is called back and the Mohan accepts him wholeheartedly once he learns of Rajan's identity. Mohan's daughter Kavita, who is about to get married, comes home from a party and finds Rajan sleeping in one of the rooms and insults him. Mohan asks her never to do so again. On the day of the marriage, the elder brother asks Mohan to write all the property in his younger brother's name and only then the marriage can take place. Mohan refuses and the bridegroom along with his people leave. Mohan asks Rajan to marry Kavita. At first, Kavita refuses but then gives in to her father's wishes. Though both of them are married, Kavita cannot stand Rajan and they do not ever stay in the same room. She is fed up with this life of hers and she goes and tells Shekhar, her former fiance about this. Kavita asks permission from her father to go to a hill station with her friends when in reality it is with Shekhar. After reaching the hill station, Shekhar lives to misbehave with her and molest her. It is Rajan who was riding in the duchy of the train car who comes to Kavita's rescue this moment changes Kavita and she starts respecting her husband. One fair morning, Rajan and Kavita are woken up by Mohan, who says Rajan is a traitor. Rajan can't understand what exactly has taken place. It turns out that an old man along with his daughter and granddaughter have shown up and are claiming to be his father-in-law's wife and daughter respectively. Though Rajan keeps on saying he is innocent, no one believes him and he is kicked out of the house. One night when Mohan is sleeping, someone shoots at him and injures him. He is taken to the hospital and in the hospital also, Shekhar's people come to hash off Mohan but are prevented from doing so. Mohan escapes from the hospital and everyone thinks he to die, having killed himself. Meanwhile, Rajan with the help of Hulk, Mohan's secretary manages to track down some members of Shekhar's gang, including the lady impersonating his wife. It turns out that she was forced to do so. Rajan and Gullu are caught and tied up. Kavita is tied up there as well. Mohan shows up there in a disguise and helps in freeing Rajan, Gullu and Kavita. Shekhar and his men again clash with Rajan, Gullu and Mohan, during which Shekhar escapes with Kavita to an unknown destination. Rajan and Gullu also land up there and help in rescuing Kavita. Mohan also arrives there soon after with the police and Shekhar is caught.

== Cast ==
- Jeetendra as Rajan
- Rekha as Kavita
- Vinod Khanna as Shekhar
- Pran as Rai Bahadur Mohan
- Johnny Walker as Gullu
- Bindu as Dancer
- Anwar Hussain as Shekhar's Elder Brother
- Kalpana Mohan

== Soundtrack ==
#	Title	Singer(s)
1	"Ho Naina Tere Naina"	Mukesh, Lata Mangeshkar
2	"Maine Keh Di Tune Sun Lee"	Lata Mangeshkar
3	"Naach Haseena Naach"	Mukesh, Ranu Mukherjee
4	"Raama O Raama"	Mukesh
5	"Saagar Labon Se Laga Le"	Asha Bhosle
