= Jagdev Singh Waraich =

Indian athlete

JS Waraich
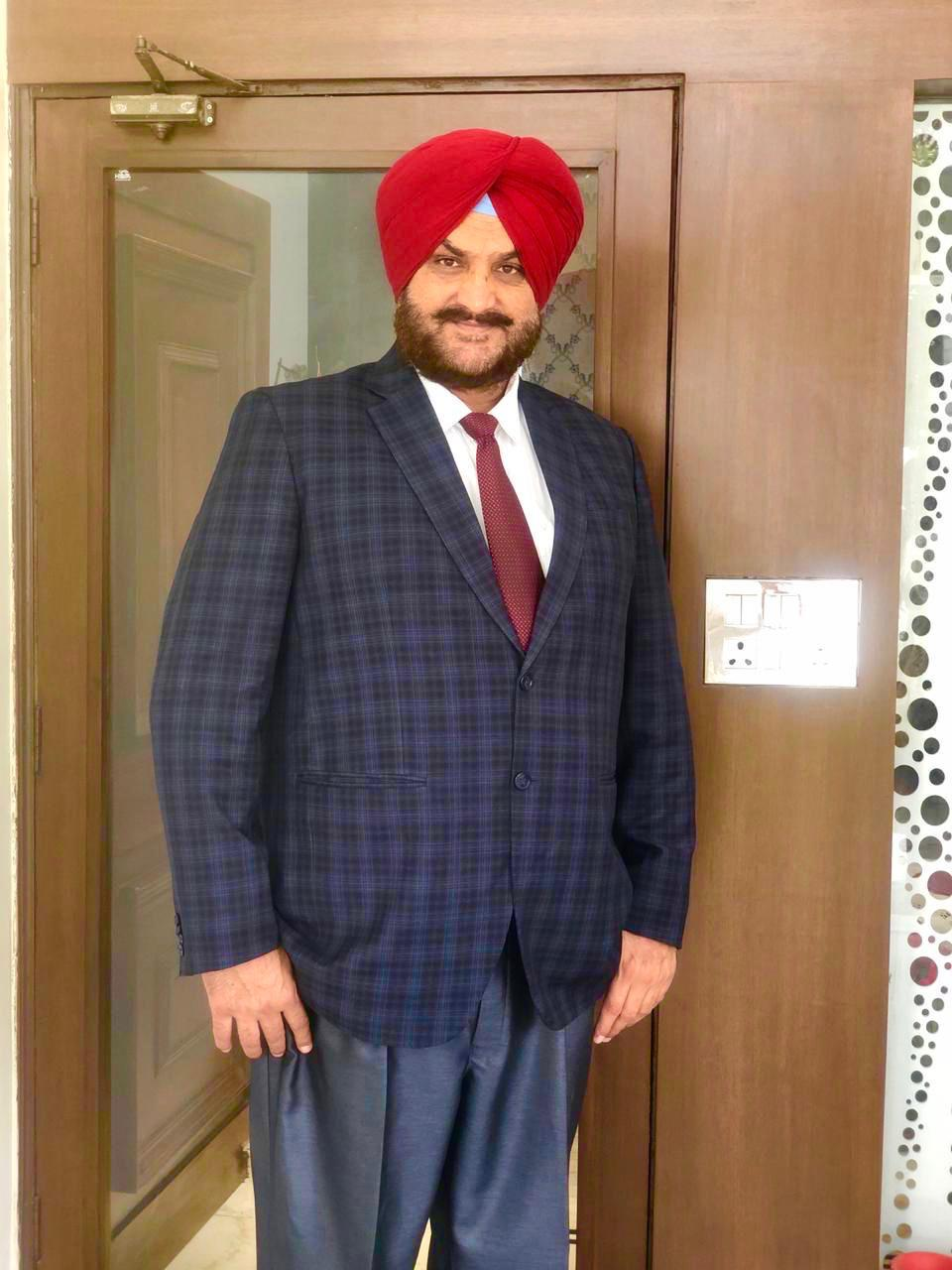

Personal information
- Nationality: Indian
- Born: Jagdev Singh Waraich
- Employer: Oil and Natural Gas Corporation (ONGC)

Jagdev Singh Waraich (born 20 November 1962) also known as JS Waraich, is a former National and International Athlete (Hammer Throw) from India. Currently, he is working with ONGC as General Manager at Dehradun. Earlier, he held the position of Head Corporate Sports with ONGC at Delhi. He was also General Secretary of All India Public Sector Sports Promotion Board (AIPSSPB),

== Achievements ==
=== National Level ===
Sr.No.	Name of the event	Venue	Date(s) Year	Achievement
1.	Open National Athletics Championships	Delhi	20 to 22 July 1990	Gold Medal
2.	All India Sr.Inter State Championship	Thiruvananthapuram	26 to 28 March 1992	Gold Medal
3.	All India Sr.Inter State Championship	Delhi	4 to 6 March 1993	Gold Medal
4.	Open National Games	Pune	16 to 25 January 1994	Silver Medal

=== International Level ===
Sr.No.	Name of the event	Venue	Date(s) Year	Achievement
1.	Singapore Open Track & Field Championship	Singapore	3 to 5 September 1993	Gold Medal^{(with the performance of 65.78 m)}
2.	South Asian Federation Games	Dhaka	22 to 25 September 1993	Gold Medal^{(with the performance of 62.12 m)}
3.	4th ITC International Athletics Meet	Delhi	13 to 14 September 1993	Bronze Medal^{(with the performance of 63.92 m)}
4.	South Asian Federation Games	Madras	20th to 24t^{h} September 1995	Bronze Medal^{(with the performance of 62.66 m)}

=== Other Achievements ===
- 15 years continuously PSPB Champion
- 10 years continuously AIPSSPB Champion
- Many Silver & Bronze medal from National Athletics meet/ Federation Cup/ Championships.
- New National Record in Hammer Throw event at Singapore in 1993 after the gap of 24 years.

== Awards ==
- Jaideep Singhji Award by Government of Gujarat in the year 1990.
- Award of Honour by PSPB in the year 1994
- Sports person of the year by ONGC in the year 1994
- Eklavya Award by Government of Gujarat in the year 1996.
- Maharaja Ranjit Singh Award by the Government of Punjab in the year 2006.
