= Sewak (film) =

- Directed by: S. M. Abbas
- Starring: Vinod Khanna; Neetu Singh
- Music by: Laxmikant-Pyarelal
- Release date: 23 November 1975
- Country: India
- Language: Hindi

Sewak is a 1975 Bollywood film, starring Vinod Khanna, Neetu Singh in lead roles. It was directed by S. M. Abbas.

== Cast ==
- Vinod Khanna as Mohan
- Neetu Singh as Rasiya
- Bindu as Bindu
- Ranjeet as Deepak
- Johnny Walker as Tripathi
- Naaz as Neeru
- Shyama as Shobha

== Music ==
Lyrics: Anjaan

Song	Singer
"Mera Naam Bada Badnam"	Lata Mangeshkar
"Banke Sanwarke Main"	Asha Bhosle
"Kahoon To Kahoon Kaise"	Asha Bhosle
"Gin Ginke Badle Lena Hai, Bachke Na Jane Dena Hai"	Asha Bhosle, Minoo Purushottam
