= Jagdev =

Jagdev is an Indian masculine given name. People with the name include:

- Jagdev Parmar
- Jagdev Chand
- Jagdev Prasad
- Jagdev Chandra
- Jagdev Singh
- Jagdev Singh Kamalu
- Jagdev Singh Khuddian
- Jagdev Singh Talwandi
- Jagdev Singh Guleria
- Jagdev Singh Rai
- Jagdev Singh Waraich

== See also ==
- Akali Dal – Jagdev Singh Talwandi Group
