= Hungama (1971 film) =

1971 Indian Bollywood comedy film

- Poster
- Directed by: S. M. Abbas
- Written by: S. M. Abbas
- Starring: Kishore Kumar; Vinod Khanna; Zeenat Aman
- Music by: R.D. Burman
- Release date: 1971
- Country: India
- Language: Hindi

Hungama is a 1971 Bollywood comedy film. The film stars Kishore Kumar, Vinod Khanna and Zeenat Aman.

== Plot ==
Bade, a rich businessman worked with his younger brother Chote. They were a mean and miserly pair. Their nephew Mehmood was a spendthrift. So they decided to get him married. But on the wedding day, the nephew ran away from home.

== Cast ==
- Kishore Kumar ... Gareebchand a.k.a. Badey
- Vinod Khanna ... Preetam
- Zeenat Aman ... Nisha
- Johnny Walker ... Naseebchand a.k.a. Chhotey
- Mehmood ... Jagdeep
- Helen ... Chameli
- Aruna Irani ... Sweety
- Faryal
- Mukri ... Talaram Dalaal
- Dhumal ... Banaspati Prasad
- Khalid Siddiqui (as Master Khalid)

== Soundtrack ==
The music of the film was composed by R.D. Burman, while lyrics were written by Anjaan.

1. "Ae Door Se Baat Karna Ri" – Kishore Kumar, Asha Bhosle
2. "Suraj Se Jo Kiran Ka Naata" – Lata Mangeshkar, Mukesh
3. "Waah Ri Kismat Waah Waah" – Asha Bhosle, Manna Dey
4. "Kachchi Kali Kachnaar Ki" – Asha Bhosle, Manna Dey
5. "Meri Jawaani Teri Deewaani" – Asha Bhosle
