= S. M. Abbas =

Indian film director and screenwriter

S.M. Abbas
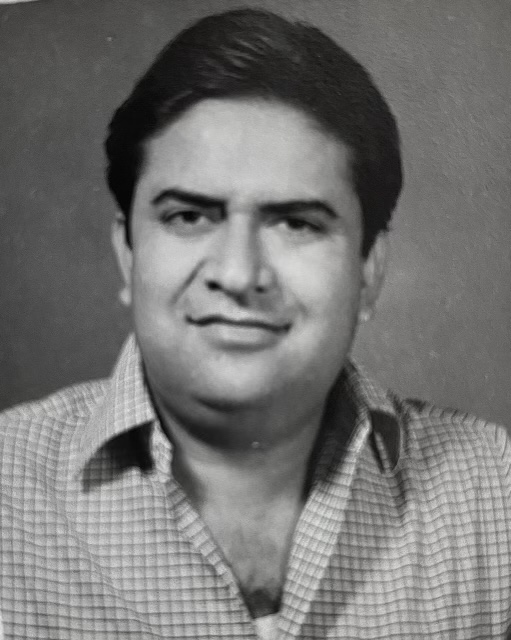
- Born: May 17, 1933; Allahabad, Uttar Pradesh, India
- Died: April 16, 2004 (aged 70); Mumbai, Maharashtra, India
- Occupations: Film Director and Screenwriter
- Spouse: Shamima Khatoon

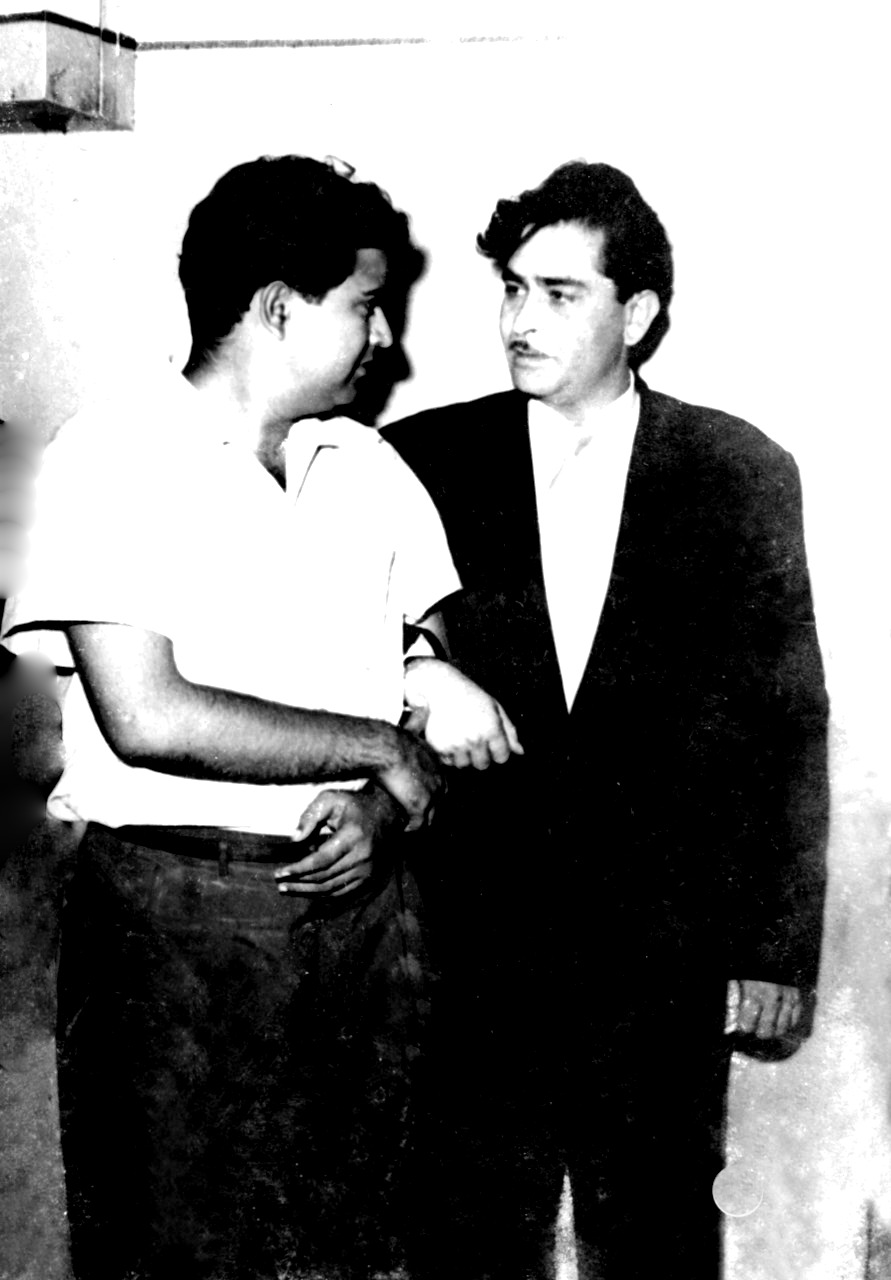
S. M. Abbas at the premiere of Shriman Satyawadi with Raj Kapoor.

S. M. Abbas (Syed Mohammad Abbas) was an influential Indian film director and screenwriter, particularly active during the 1960s and 1970s. He is best known for his work on several popular Bollywood films such as "Shriman Satyawadi" (1960), "Hungama" (1971), "Ek Hasina Do Diwane" (1972), and "Kab? Kyoon? Aur Kahan?" (1970). Abbas contributed significantly to the Indian film industry, especially in the genres of comedy and drama. His family connections also link him to notable Bollywood personalities, as his son Usman Syed is married to Radha, the younger sister of the renowned actress Rekha. His younger son, Talat, is married to the granddaughter of art director Sant Singh.

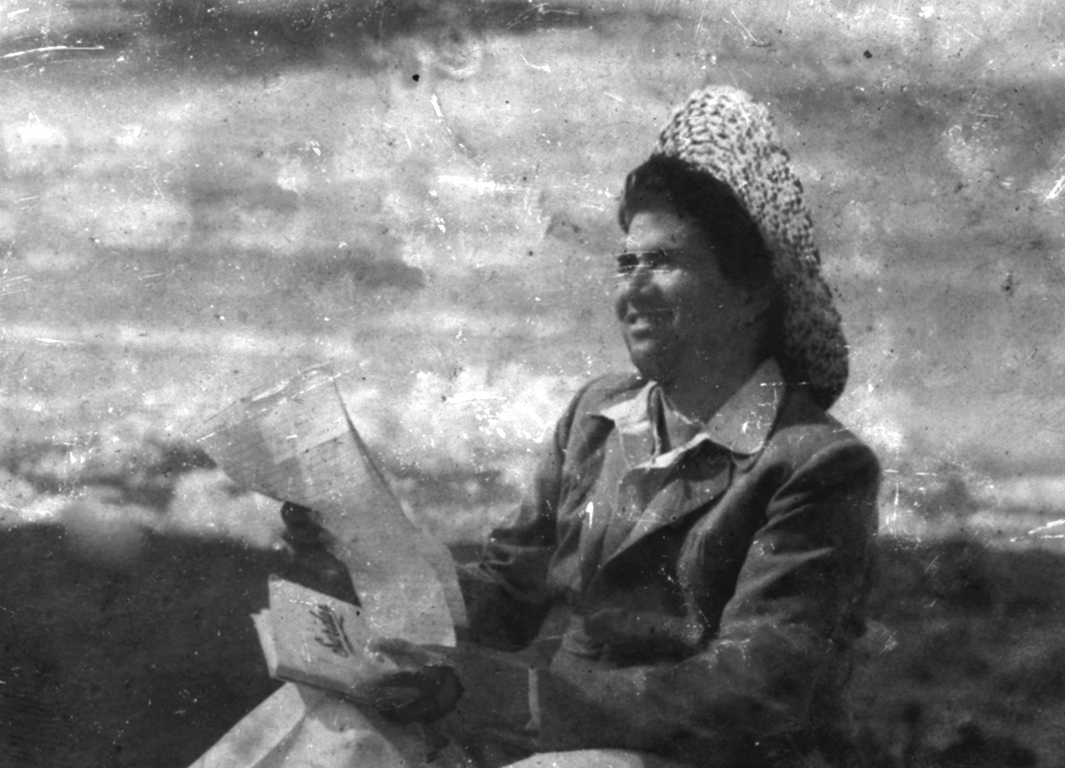
S. M. Abbas on the set of Purnima.

== Career ==
After graduating from Allahabad University, S. M. Abbas left for Bombay in early 1957, with a clear destination in mind: the film industry. He dreamt of being an actor. In Allahabad, he participated in several stage dramas and directed them at the locally famous cinema hall "Palace." His drama "Parda Uthaao, Parda Girao," based on Dr. Kumar Verma's play, was well received.

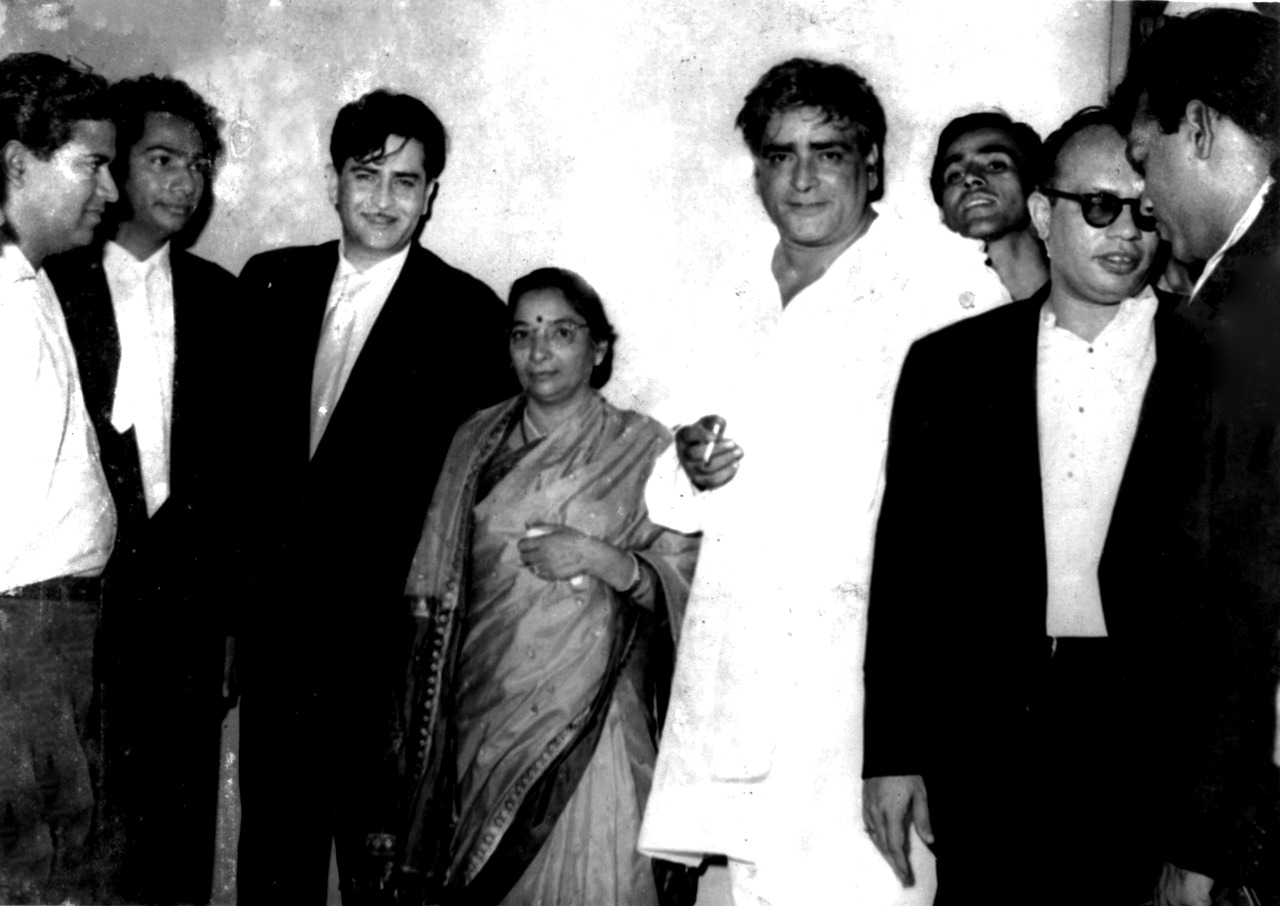
S. M. Abbas (left) with his cast and crew of Shriman Satyawadi.

In late 1957, his first film "Ek Jhalak" (starring Pradeep Kumar and Vyjayanthimala) was released. Instead of acting, he assisted director Kali Das under the pseudonym Ram Kumar. His next film was the Raj Kapoor starrer "Parvarish" in 1958, where he wrote additional dialogues and assisted the main writer Saghir Usmani, again using the name Ram Kumar.

The big break came in 1960-61 with "Shriman Satyavadi," considered by some, including himself, to be his best directorial venture.

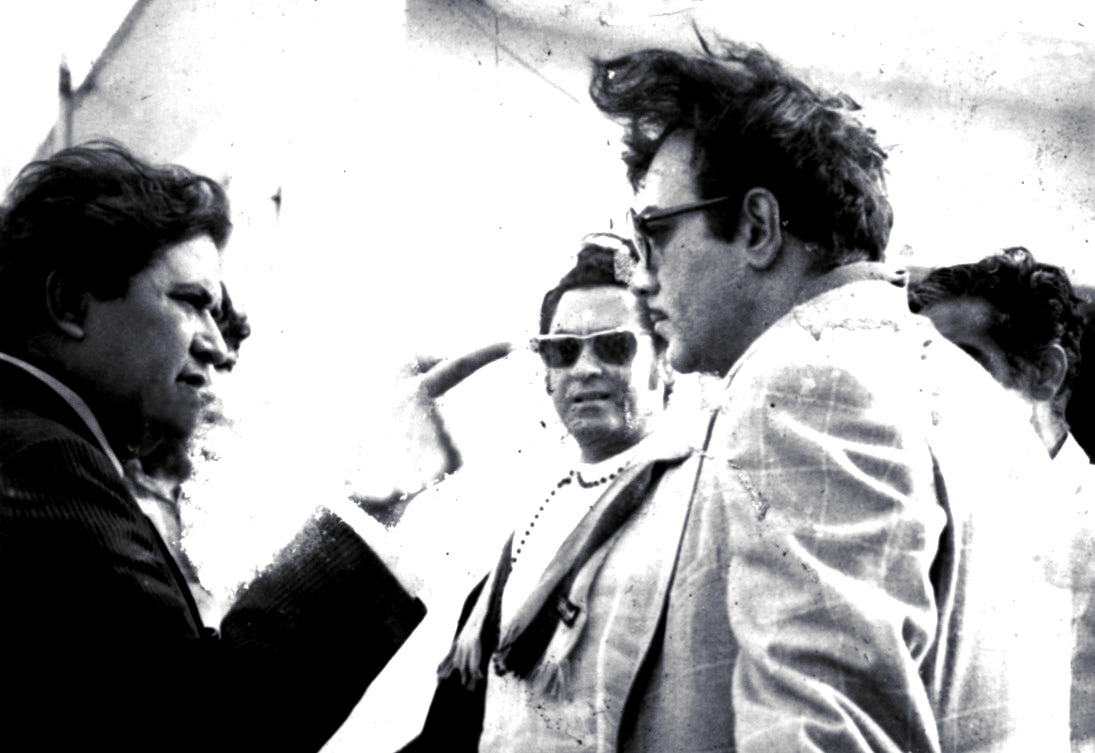
S.M. Abbas with Kishore Kumar and Mehmood during the shoot of Hungama.

During this period, he worked on low-budget stunt movies like "Jadui Topi" and "Kaala Chashma." He also dubbed non-Hindi movies, including the well-received Russian film "Soldier's Father." After experiencing a downturn, Abbas saw an upward trend in his career. In the late 1960s, "Hasina Maan Jayegi" gave a significant boost to his writing career.

== Personal life ==
S.M. Abbas married Shamima Khatoon in 1952.They went on to have four children together.

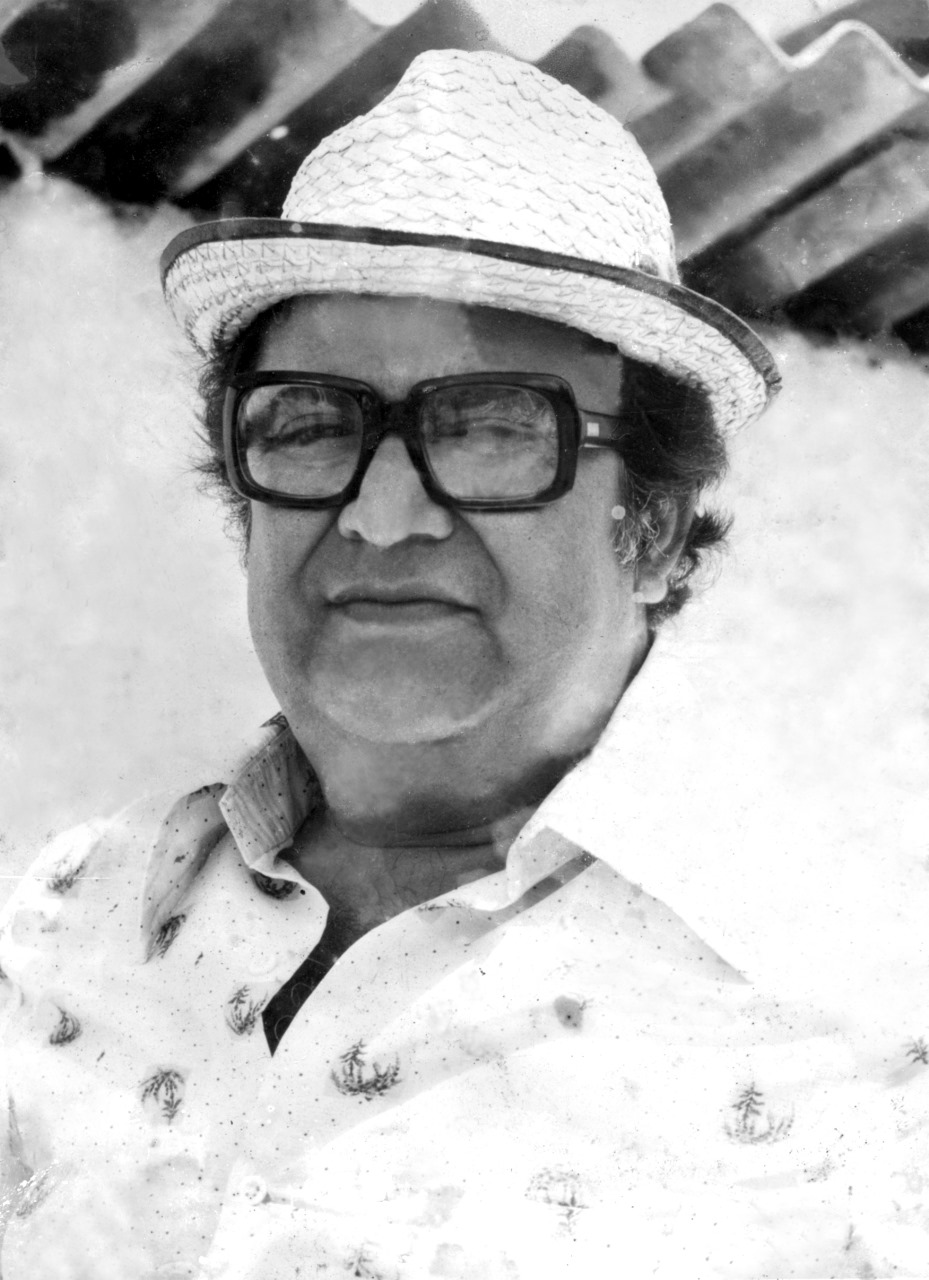
S. M. Abbas in 1986

S.M. Abbas graduated from Allahabad University. In his early days, he represented the university hockey team. His father was subedar in the British Army.

He died on April 16, 2004 in SL Raheja Hospital in Mahim. His wish was to be buried in his village, Asrawe Khurd, a village near Allahabad, Uttar Pradesh.

== Filmography ==
Year	Title	Director	Writer	Producer	Ref(s)
1958	Parvarish	No	Yes	No	
1959	Satta Bazaar	No	Yes	No	
1960	Shriman Satyawadi	Yes	Yes	No	
1963	Kan Kan Men Bhagwan	No	Yes	No	
1964	Majboor	No	Yes	No	
1964	Punar Milan	No	Yes	No	
1965	Purnima	No	Yes	No	
1965	Sangram	No	Yes	No	
1965	Saiyan Se Neha Lagaibe	Yes	No	No	
1965	Saheli	No	Yes	No	
1968	Haseena Maan Jayegi	No	Yes	No	
1970	Kab? Kyoon? Aur Kahan?	No	Yes	No	
1970	Himmat	No	Yes	No	
1971	Hungama	Yes	Yes	No	
1971	Paras	No	Yes	No	
1972	Ek Hasina Do Diwane	Yes	Yes	No	
1972	Ek Bechara	Yes	Yes	No	
1973	Kahani Kismat Ki	No	Yes	No	
1974	Chor Machaye Shor	No	Yes	No	
1975	Sewak	Yes	Yes	No	
1976	Fakira	No	Yes	No	
1976	Suntan	No	Yes	No	
1977	Farishta Ya Qatil	Yes	Yes	No	
1977	Khel Khilari Ka	No	Yes	No	
1977	Kalabaaz	No	Yes	No	
1978	Heeralaal Pannalal	No	Yes	No	
1981	Sahhas	No	Yes	No	
1982	Ghazab	No	Yes	No	
1982	Daulat(1982 film)	No	Yes	No	
1982	Raaj Mahal	No	Yes	No	
1986	Mazloom	No	Yes	No	
1987	Godna	No	Yes	No	
1989	Nache Nagin Gali Gali	No	Yes	No	
1990	Wafaa(1990 film)	Yes	Yes	No	
1990	Maa O Maa	No	Yes	No	
1991	Ghar Parivaar	No	Yes	No	

=== Acting credits ===
Year	Title	Role
1954	Chor Bazar	Extras
