= Shriman Satyawadi =

- Poster
- Directed by: S. M. Abbas
- Written by: Manu Prasad
- Screenplay by: Adi Marzban
- Produced by: Mahipatray Shah
- Starring: Raj Kapoor; Mehmood; Nasir Hussain; Radhakrishan; Shakila
- Cinematography: Jayendra Kapadia; C.S. Puttu
- Edited by: Ramchandra Mahadik
- Music by: Dattaram Wadkar
- Distributed by: Ultra Distributors
- Release date: 1960
- Running time: 147 minutes
- Country: India
- Language: Hindi

Shriman Satyawadi is a 1960 Hindi film, directed by S. M. Abbas. Raj Kapoor, in the lead role is seen in this social drama as an honest man, who will experience only too well how difficult it is to compete in a dishonest world.

== Plot ==
Young Vijay Kumar lives with his sick and widowed father Mohanlal under poor conditions. As an honest shopkeeper, he deserves the wherewithal to provide for himself and his son. This doesn't suit the neighbour and competitor Lalachand at all. One day, he hides cocaine in Mohanlal's shop and alerts the police. After the police find it, they want to discipline Mohanlal, who is always honest. But the sick man could not cope with this and dies of a heart attack.

Sad about this death, Vijay never forgot the words of his father and grew up to be an honest doctor. After graduating from college, he finds a job in the advertising department of the rich Champalal and his daughter, Geeta, who is responsible for this Department. Also, he meets Kishore, Lalachand's son, who could not stand Vijay during school.

While Vijay and Kishore fight for Geeta's heart, Lalachand wants to increase his fortune. He makes the ignorant Champalal his investor and manufactures untested skin creams and fake painkillers.

Wanting to impress Geeta with fast success, Kishore releases the cream in market, without waiting for the test reports. However, already the first customers come with their complaints, while the editor of a local newspaper, Moni Chatterjee, is present and interviews Vijay. This confirms that the cream was already introduced on the market before waiting for the test report.

The article in the newspaper represents bad publicity for Champalal's company and Vijay is accused of telling the truth. Since this would otherwise breach his principles, Vijay quits his job, much to the annoyance of Geeta, who is already in love with the honest man.

Soon, Vijay finds a job with Moni Chatterjee, who was impressed by his honesty. Due to his sincere reports, Vijay is very popular, so a helpless blind man turns to him one day. He maintains that his child had died as a result of the painkiller. Vijay is on the trail. His path ultimately leads to Lalachand, who threatens him with death, if ever an article about the toxic pain killers should appear. But Vijay felt afraid of the truth and gets into some turbulence. Finally, the truth prevails and Lalachand is discharged while Champalal apologizes to Vijay. Also Geeta, practitioner of love finds a happy ending.

== Cast ==
- Raj Kapoor as Vijay Kumar
- Shakila as Geeta
- Mehmood as Kishore
- Nazir Hussain as Champalal
- Gopal Sehgal as costumer
- Radhakrishan as Lalchand
- Raja Nene as Mohanlal
- Moni Chatterjee as Editor

== Music ==
The music for this movie was composed by Dattaram. Lyrics were written by Hasrat Jaipuri, Gulshan Bawra and Gulzar under his Pen name "Gulzar Deenvi."

Song	Singer
"Haal-E-Dil Hamara Jane Na"	Mukesh
"Bheegi Hawaon Mein, Teri Adaon Mein"	Manna Dey, Suman Kalyanpur
"Rut Albeli Mast Sama"	Mukesh
"Rang Rangeeli Botal Ka"	Mohammed Rafi
"Kyun Uda Jata Hai Aanchal"	Suman Kalyanpur
"Ek Baat Kahun Vallah, Yeh Husn Subhanallah, Jab Naam Liya, Dil Tham Liya"	Mukesh, Mahendra Kapoor, Suman Kalyanpur
"Ae Dil Dekhe Hai Humne"	Mukesh
