= Arjun Hingorani =

Indian director, producer and actor (1926-2018)

- Born: 15 November 1926
- Died: 5 May 2018 (aged 91); Mathura, Uttar Pradesh, India
- Occupation: Director • producer • actor
- Spouse: Kunda
- Children: Amit Hingorani and Sucheta
- Relatives: Madhavi Panjwani (Granddaughter)

Arjun Hingorani (15 Nov 1926 – 5 May 2018) was an Indian Bollywood director, producer and actor. He launched Dharmendra and Sadhana Shivdasani in Indian cinema. His other major contribution to Indian cinema was making the first Sindhi film, Abana, in 1958.

== Career ==
He launched Dharmendra in the 1960 movie Dil Bhi Tera Hum Bhi Tere. Dharmendra, then, featured in many of his later films including Kab? Kyoon? Aur Kahan?, Kahani Kismat Ki, Khel Khilari Ka, Katilon Ke Kaatil etc. He was also known for naming his films with titles containing three Ks i.e. KKK. He also played roles in a few of his films such as in Kab? Kyoon? Aur Kahaan? (1970) and as the main villain in Kaun Kare Kurbanie (1991). Kaun Kare Kurbanie was his final film as director. In 2003, he produced his final film Kaise Kahoon Ke... Pyaar Hai.

== Filmography ==
Year	Title	Role	Ref(s)
1958	Abana	Director	
1960	Dil Bhi Tera Hum Bhi Tere	Director	
1970	Kab? Kyoon? Aur Kahan?	Director, Producer, Actor	
1973	Kahani Kismat Ki	Director, Producer, Actor	
1977	Khel Khilari Ka	Director, Actor	
1981	Katilon Ke Kaatil	Director, Producer, Actor	
1985	Karishma Kudrat Kaa	Producer	
1986	Sultanat	Producer, Actor	
1991	Kaun Kare Kurbanie	Director, Producer, Actor	
2003	Kaise Kahoon Ke... Pyaar Hai	Producer	
