= Kunwar Mohinder Singh Bedi Sahar =

Indian Urdu poet

- Born: 9 March 1909; Chak Bedi, Montgomery District (now Sahiwal District), Punjab, British India
- Died: 18 July 1992 (aged 83)
- Occupation: Poet

Kunwar Mohinder Singh Bedi, pen name Sahar, was an Indian Urdu poet. The Times of India called him a "noted Urdu poet".

== Personal life ==
Sahar was born in Chak Bedi, Montgomery District, Punjab, British India on 9 March 1909. Montgomery District fell in Pakistan after partition of India-Pakistan and his family shifted to Fazilka, India. Montgomery District was later named as Sahiwal District. Chak Bedi is currently part of Pakpattan District, Punjab, Pakistan.

== Career ==
His poetry is varied and includes traditional themes of love and yearning but also themes of unity, peace between India and Pakistan and humor. His poetry is considered to belong to the same transreligious and transnational tradition as that of other well-known poets from the Indian subcontinent such as Muhammad Iqbal, Faiz Ahmad Faiz and Ahmad Faraz.

Sahar's first book of poetry was T̤ulūʻ-i-Saḥar (1962) (translation "Advent of Daybreak"; the title is a play on words as pen name "Sahar", in Urdu means daybreak). In 1983, he published a collection of autobiographical poetry titled Yādon̲ kā Jashn ("A Celebration of Memories").

An international event to celebrate his poetry, called Jashan-e-Sahar ("A celebration for Sahar"), was held in the UAE in 1992.

=== Poetry ===
An example of his use of humor to make a serious point is the following ruba'i:

Waiz ki jawani bhi kiya shaiy hai khuda rakhay
yeh waqaf e aghaz o anjam nahi hoti
youn lazat e duniya se mehromi o nakami
Allah ki lathi mein awaz nahi hoti

Translation:

The preacher's youth is something to behold
it does not know a beginning or an end
this abstention from the joys of the world
God's punishment is indeed silent

== Movies ==
Kanwar Mohinder Singh Bedi was also involved in the Indian film industry and produced three movies:

- Man Jeete Jag Jeet (1973) (Kunawar Mohinder Singh Bedi also had an acting cameo in this movie as D C Sahib)
- Dukh Bhanjan Tera Naam (1974)
- Charandas (1977)

== Kanwar Mohinder Singh Bedi Award ==
An award was created in his honor known as the Kanwar Mohinder Singh Bedi Award, presented by Haryana Urdu Akademi. In 2023 it carried a cash prize of INR 21,000, a shawl, a memento and citation.

Winners

- 1990: Yusuf Nazim
- 1991: Narendra Luther
- 1992: Raza Naqvi Wahi
- 1997: Mujtaba Hussain
- 2006: Ibn-e-Kanwal
- 2008: Dharmadev Swami
- 2009: Himmat Singh Sinha
- 2010: Kumar Panipati
- 2013: S P Sharma Tafta
- 2017: Krishna Kumar ‘Toor’
- 2018: Sultan Anjum
- 2019: Naseeruddin Azhar
- 2020: Qamar Raees

== See also ==
- List of Indian poets
- List of Urdu language poets

== Bibliography ==
- T̤ulūʻ-i-Saḥar, 1962 ("Advent of Daybreak")
- Yādon̲ kā Jashn, 1983 ("A Celebration of Memories")
