= Haryana Urdu Akademi =

Established in 1985 by the state Government of Haryana, India, the mission of the Haryana Urdu Akademi is to promote Urdu language in the state of Haryana.

== Activities ==
The activities of the Akademi involve organizing seminars, events (e.g. mushairas) and publishing magazines and books. The Akademi also bestows literary awards for contributions to the culture of Haryana through scholarship towards Urdu language in Haryana. These include The National Hali Award and state awards (i) Munshi Gumani Lal Award (ii) Kunwar Mohinder Singh Bedi Sahar Award and (iii) Surendra Pandit Soz Award. The academy also offers Diploma in Urdu.

Notable books published by the Akademi include works such as 'Tameer-e-Yaas' by Jagan Nath Azad, 'Haryanavi brij ke megh malahar' by Javed Vashisht, 'Jawahar Lal Nehru Apni Tehreeron Ki Roshni Mein' by Kashmiri Lal Zakir, 'Khawaja Ahmed Abbas-Ifkar.Guftar, Kirdar' by Raj Narain Raz, amongst many others publications by the Akademi

The Akademi boasts a public library established in September 2020.
