= Dukh Bhanjan Tera Naam =

1974 Indian Film

- Directed by: B.S Thapa
- Written by: Krishan Ksarshar
- Produced by: Kunwar Mohinder Singh Bedi Sahar
- Starring: Radha Saluja, Shaminder, Kharaiti, Sunder, Gopal Saehgal
- Narrated by: Kunwar Mohinder Singh Bedi Sahar
- Cinematography: Sant Singh
- Edited by: D.N.Pai
- Music by: S. Mohinder
- Production companies: Bedi & Bakshi productions
- Release date: 1974
- Running time: 126 minutes
- Country: India
- Language: Punjabi

Dukh Bhanjan Tera Naam (1974) is a Punjabi movie about Sikhism.

== Plot ==
In the era of Guru Ram Das, one cannot leave out Rajni, youngest daughter of Rai Duni Chand, revenue collector (kardar) of Patti. Rajni was a Sikh, a disciple of the Guru. One day she was sitting with her sisters admiring some new clothing they all had received from their father. The girls were ecstatic and exclaiming how good their father was to them. Rajni observed that all gifts are ultimately from God. Their father was merely an instrument of His greatness. Unfortunately for her, he overheard her comment and became very angry.

It was not the first time that she incurred his wrath because of her extreme piety. The infuriated father, believing her to be an ungrateful wretch, married her to a leper with a taunt that he would see how her God would help her lead a normal life. The leper was severely disfigured and a foul smell came from his body. The poor girl had accepted her fate ungrudgingly and worked hard to maintain herself and her crippled husband. She kept repeating the name of God, and was certain that he was testing her with this turn of events. She was forced to beg for a living. Still she bathed and fed her leper husband, never losing faith. One day, she reached the site of a pool on her way to a neighbouring village. Placing the basket containing her husband by the side of the pool, she had gone off on an errand, most probably to look for food. In the meantime, her crippled husband had seen a black crow dip into the water of the pool and come out white. Amazed at this miracle, the man crawled up to the edge of the pool and managed a dip. He found himself completely cured. When his wife returned, she was amazed to find her husband in good health. He was handsome and whole. At first, she was alarmed and suspected that he might be a different person. He had, however, kept one finger with leprosy marks un-dipped. He showed her the diseased finger as proof of his identity. The couple thanked God, and went to the Guru to seek his blessings.

The pool was the future site of the Golden Temple. The medicinal properties of the water are said to have come from the Word of God (Gurbani, believed as sacred texts by Sikhs). Rajni's leper husband was cured in the pool. Sakhi relates that if one keeps faith in God then one day all rewards are paid. Bibi Rajni had always kept the faith in Guru and God, being happy with whatever she had and thus was rewarded at the end.

== Cast ==
- Dharmendra as Bullcart Driver
- Dara Singh as Daku Daulay Khan
- Sunil Dutt as Sadhu
- Rajendra Kumar as Boatman
- Kunwar Mohinder Singh Bedi Sahar as stage presenter at the beginning of the movie
- Shaminder as Pingla
- Ranjeet as Daku
- Manmohan Krishna as Sant Faqir
- Johnny Walker as Hakim
- Om Prakash as Rajguru
- Sunder as Pandit
- Sonia Sahni as Pandtiyan
- Moolchand as Lala
- Goga Kapoor as Man who came to drink water from Sunil Dutt
- Ram Avtar as Duni Chand Mantri
- Gopal Saigal as Lutera Sadhu
- V.Gopal as Sadhu
- Khareti as Mukhiya Pandit
- Radha Saluja as Rajni
- Baby Chintu as Young Rajni
- Damyanti Puri as Woman gave cloth to Rajni after rain
- Shoma Anand as Rajni's sister
- D. K. Sapru as Raja Duni Chand
- Bachchan Singh as Raja Duni Chand's Sipahi guard
- Veena as Rani Sheela
- Bhushan Tiwari as Ram Lal
- Nathuram as Dwarf man (Johnny Walker's assistant)

== Music ==
S. Mohinder composed the music and Inderjit Hasanpuri and K. Sarshar penned the lyrics while many of the lyrical compositions are taken from the Gurbani (from the Sikh religious text, Guru Granth Sahib). Asha Bhosle, Mohammed Rafi and Suman Kalyanpur are the playback singers.

- Babal Phire Var Tolda – performed by Suman Kalyanpur
- Main Andle Ki Tek – performed by Asha Bhosle
- Jete Samund Sagar Neer Bharya (with dialogue) – performed by Mohammed Rafi
- Main Andhale Ki Tek (with dialogue) – performed by Manna Dey and Usha Rege – written by Namdev ji
- Dukh Bhanjan Tera Naam (with dialogue) – performed by Mohammed Rafi
- Uth Farida Ooj Saj performed by S. Mohinder
- Qumbe Badha Jal Rahe (with dialogue) – performed by Sunil Dutt
- O Babla Eh Ki Kehar Kamaya – performed by Mohammed Rafi
- Dar Ma De Thande Darbar (with dialogue) – performed by Asha Bhosle
- Jo Tud Bhave (with dialogue) – performed by Mohammed Rafi
