= Soldier Thakur Daler Singh =

- Starring: Dharmendra
- Music by: Sonik–Omi
- Release date: 1969
- Language: Hindi

Soldier Thakur Daler Singh is a 1969 Bollywood film starring Ajit Singh Deol Dharmendra, Deepa, Om Prakash, Mehmood.

== Soundtrack ==
Music Director – Sonik Omi Lyricist – Aziz Kashmiri

1. "Gore Gaalon Se Chilman Hata Lijiye" - Mohammed Rafi, Krishna Kalle
2. "Hum Hind Ke Mazdoor Kabhi Mar Nahi Sakte" - Mohammed Rafi
3. "Hum Ne Suna Tha Bada CharchaJanaab Ka" - Asha Bhosle
4. "Tum Ek Nazar Dekho To Idhar" - Asha Bhosle
5. "Zameen Ke Chaand Tere Dil MeinPyar Hai Ke Nahi" - Asha Bhosle

== Crew ==
- Producer – Pachhi was brother of Om Parkash in real life
- Cinematographer – S.S.Chaddha
- Music Director – Sonik Omi
- Lyricist – Aziz Kashmiri
- Writer – Aziz Kashmiri
- Editor – Surya Kumar
