= Kaise Kahoon Ke... Pyaar Hai =

- Poster
- Directed by: Anil Kumaar Sharma
- Written by: Sameer Arora
- Produced by: Arjun Hingorani
- Starring: Amit Hingorani; Sharbani Mukherjee; Dharmendra; Farida Jalal
- Cinematography: Yogesh Jani; Feroz A. Shaikh
- Edited by: Rahul Bhatankar
- Music by: Viju Shah
- Production company: Kalpeshwar Pictures
- Release date: 9 May 2003
- Running time: 132 minutes
- Country: India
- Language: Hindi

Kaise Kahoon Ke... Pyaar Hai is a 2003 Indian Hindi-language romantic crime film directed by Anil Kumaar Sharma, starring Amit Hingorani, Sharbani Mukherjee, Dharmendra, and Farida Jalal.

== Plot ==
Karan is the son of Lakshmi and Dharam. His father is a professional robber, so his mother leaves him to raise Karan and his sister Kiran in dignity. However, when Karan comes of age, he supports his father's nocturnal adventures and becomes a successful burglar.

In college, he falls in love with Priya, the daughter of the wealthy Somnath Arya. Since he is a burglar, he does not dare to tell Priya about his love—however, he tells Sandwich, his loyal friend. Priya is also in love with Karan but doesn't tell him because she is shy, despite her best friend Nikki's attempts to match the two of them, and things get difficult for her when Sonia (Nilofer) joins the college, who is extremely good-looking and tries to woo Karan. However, at a party, Karan finally admits his feelings for Priya, and she is beyond happy. He tells his father that the robbery at a diamond exhibition will be his last deed, since they want to donate the money out of it to a cancer hospital.

Things get difficult when CBI officer Arjun Singh announces that he will catch Karan in just ten days. During the robbery, Arjun Singh shows up, Dharam gets shot, and Karan is caught; he is sent to jail for one year.

Lakshmi and Kiran are devastated; his mother disowns him. Priya, while Karan is gone, cannot forget him. After a year, Karan apologized to his mother, telling her he'll never steal again, but he doesn't gather the courage to call Priya and decides to leave it that way. However, he takes up a job with Somnath Arya, Priyas father, and meets her again. They confess their love for each other, and Somnath wants them to get married. However, Karan finds out that he has blood cancer. He stages some kind of fake drama on the engagement day to convince Priya he is actually in love with Sonia - so she will forget him and fall out of love to be saved from the consequences when his disease will finally kill him.

Karan tells Somnath the truth and asks him for help to get his sister Kiran married so she will be provided for when he will finally die. Somnath reveals that his entire company was held ransom by Deoraj, who himself was under threat from Thakur, a powerful underworld lord. Somnath asks Karan to help him get an important document out of Deoraj's safe - in exchange, he will make sure Kiran is married off. Karan agrees and steals the document, only to be arrested the next day for Deoraj's murder. Lakshmi again is a broken woman, but Sandwich, who knows that Karan did what he did to save the family, explains everything to her. Sonia also explains to Priya why Karan left her. Priya rushes to jail to talk to Karan, and after some emotional exclamations, things get out of control, and she falls down the stairs, badly wounded. Karan happens to have the same blood group and is asked for a donation, where it is revealed that he does not suffer from blood cancer.

In jail, he realizes that the real culprit is still out there, but why did he kill Deoraj, and why did the doctors lie to him? With the help of Arjun Singh, Karan breaks out of jail to find the answers.

== Cast ==
- Amit Hingorani as Karan
- Sharbani Mukherjee as Priya Oberoi
- Dharmendra as Dharam
- Farida Jalal as Lakshmi
- Alok Nath as Somnath Arya
- Anamika as Kiran
- Shakti Kapoor as Deoraj
- Johnny Lever as Sandwich
- Nilofer as Sonia
- Rushali Arora as Nikki
- Sunny Deol as Arjun Singh (special appearance)

== Soundtrack ==
The music was composed by Viju Shah.

#	Title	Singer(s)
1	"Kaise Kahoon Ke Pyaar Hai"	Udit Narayan, Kavita Krishnamurthy
2	"Dil Tera Dil"	Udit Narayan, Alka Yagnik
3	"Le Gayi"	Shaan
4	"O Jamalo"	Udit Narayan
5	"Kaise Kahoon Ke Pyaar Hai (II)"	Udit Narayan, Kavita Krishnamurthy
6	"O Mere Kisan Kanaiya"	Sukhwinder Singh

== Reception ==
Taran Adarsh of IndiaFM gave the film 1 out of 5, writing ″Amit Hingorani radiates sincerity and the boy does a decent job considering his debut film. He is at ease in stunts and dances, but needs to work on emotional and dramatic sequences. Sharbani Mukherji looks pretty and does her part ably. Both Dharmendra and Sunny Deol are wasted. In fact, Sunny's fans will be disappointed to see the actor in a minuscule role. Farida Jalal is mechanical. Alok Nath is getting typecast. Shakti Kapoor and Johny Lever look disinterested. On the whole, KAISE KAHOON KE PYAAR HAI is a poor fare.″ Deepa Gumaste of Rediff.com wrote ″With each successive reel, the story takes a new and bizarre twist, thereby keeping you guessing about what more to expect from director Anil Kumaar Sharma (who is not to be mistaken for the maker of Gadar and The Hero: Love Story Of A Spy). ″Honestly, what can you say about the finer details of this cinematic blunder of Titanic proportions?″
