= Majboor (1964 film) =

- Directed by: Narendra Suri
- Written by: Sachin Bowmick; S. M. Abbas
- Produced by: Mohan Segal
- Starring: Biswajeet, Waheeda Rehman, Lalita Pawar
- Cinematography: M.N. Malhotra
- Edited by: Pratap Dave
- Music by: [Kalyanji and Ananandji and Asst. Lakshmikant Payrelal
- Release date: 7 July 1964
- Country: India
- Language: Hindi

Majboor is a 1964 Indian Drama film produced by Mohan Segal and directed by Narendra Suri in Hindi language under the banner of Deluxe Films.

== Plot ==
Sheel is the daughter of Dr. Mehta, who incidentally meets Ravi in disguise of a boy but soon fall in love, Ravi marries Sheel against the wishes of his mother. Sheel faces the wrath of her mother-in-law for petty reasons. Ravi's sister Seema is befriended by a ruffian Rajkumar(Jagdev) which is dissented by Sheel. Sheel's compounder Khilonaram loves Bansari but a sweetmaker Lala (Ram Avatar)opposes as he also loves Bansari, too.

Ravi has to go to Mumbai for some training, which he informs only Sheel, this annoys Ravi's mother so much that she tells him to choose either her or Sheel to stay in the house, so Sheel finally relents and goes to her father's house who also passes away soon.

Rajkumar comes to ask Seema's mother for her hand but is driven away by her due to her aristocratic standards. Seema pleads with Rajkumar to get married her as she is pregnant with his child, but he refuses, so she jumps into the river, only to be saved by Sheel, She then takes Seema to the city where she delivers the child and there on both go to stay at Ravi's place stating that the child belongs to Sheel. She vows to Seema to keep the secret. Rajkumar now working for Ravi commits a fraud, for which he has to repay back. Rajkumar knowing the truth of the child now blackmails Sheel and extorts money from her.

Ravi now discovers that Rajkumar is blackmailing Sheel and is suspicious of her.

Seema now intends to marry Shekhar by her mother which annoys Rajkumar and is killed in a scuffle by Ravi after he tells him that the child in his belongs to him. Ravi decides to go to jail to teach a lesson to an unfaithful Sheel. After a court room trial Ravi is acquitted. Finally Seema accepts that the child actually belongs to her and Sheel had kept it a secret to protect the family name. The mother-in-law realises her mistake and even Ravi accepts Sheel and Shekar agrees to marry Seema.

== Cast ==
- Biswajeet as Ravi
- Waheeda Rehman as Sheel
- Lalita Pawar as Ravi's mother
- Naaz as Seema (Ravi's sister)
- Jagdev as Raj Kumar
- Suresh as Shekhar
- Rajendra Nath as Khilonaram (compounder)
- Sabita Chatterjee as Bansari
- Ram Avtar as Lala
- Sapru as Public Prosecutor (lawyer)
- Brahm Bharadwaj as judge
- Gopal Sehgal as pandit at Rajinder Nath's wedding

== Soundtrack ==
All but one songs were written by Anand Bakshi.

- "Tumhen Jo Bhi Dekh Legaa, Kisi Kaa Naa Ho" - Hemant Kumar (written by Indeevar)
- "Diwana Kah Ke Logo Ne Mujhe Aksar Bhulaya Hai" - Mahendra Kapoor, Lata Mangeshkar
- "Yeh Baat Hoti Hai Paida Janab" - Mohammed Rafi
- "Tere Bina O Sajna" - Lata Mangeshkar
- "Badli Hai Zamane Ki Nazar Dekhiye Kya Ho" - Lata Mangeshkar
