= Apne Dushman =

1975 film

- Poster
- Directed by: Kailash Bandari
- Starring: Dharmendra; Sanjeev Kumar
- Production company: Jeetendra Enterprises
- Release date: November 19, 1975
- Country: India
- Language: Hindi

Apne Dushman is a 1975 Bollywood drama film directed by Kailash Bandari. The film stars Dharmendra, Reena Roy and Sanjeev Kumar in lead roles.

== Cast ==
- Dharmendra as Brijesh
- Sanjeev Kumar as Doctor
- Reena Roy as Reshma
- Rakesh Pandey as Mr Singh
- Mohan Choti
- Imtiaz Khan as William
- Rajan Haksar as Ustad Raghu
- Dev Kumar
- Lalita Kumari

== Songs ==
1. "Is Desh Ka Socho Kya Hoga" - Mohammed Rafi
2. "Ho Laga Aisa Pichhe Mai Ho Gayi Re Banwariya" - Asha Bhosle
