= Do Chehere =

- Poster
- Directed by: Kewal Misra
- Written by: Bharat Vyas
- Produced by: Ratan Kumar Purohit
- Starring: Dharmendra; Prem Nath; Bindu
- Distributed by: Ratan Pictures
- Release date: 1978
- Country: India
- Language: Hindi

Do Chehere is a 1978 Bollywood drama film directed by Kewal Misra produced by Ratan Kumar Purohit. The film stars Dharmendra, Prem Nath and Bindu.

== Cast ==
- Dharmendra ...Kanwar Pran (Drunkard) / C.I.D. S.P. Shukla
- Prem Nath ...Qawaali Singer / INSP.
- Bindu ...Dancer
- Mahipal
- Veerendra ...Raj
- Aruna Irani ...Rani / Mohini
- Ramesh Deo ...Ramesh
- Padma Khanna
- Ram Mohan
- Durga Khote ...Daadima
- Murad ...Maharaj
- Shekhar Purohi
- Firoz Irani
- Master Maruti
- Master Ravi ...Munna

== Music ==
1. "Aaj Ki Raat Pine De Saakhi, Kal Se Taubha Taubha" - Mohammed Rafi, Hemlata, Minoo Purushottam, Manna Dey
2. "O Saathi Preet Ki Reet Nibhana" - Yesudas
3. "Chali Thi Thumka De Ke Thaska" - Asha Bhosle, Minoo Purushottam
4. "Iss Raat Ke Sannate Me" - Asha Bhosle
5. "Mai Toh Sapne Sanwaar Kar Baithi" - Asha Bhosle
6. "Mere Chehala Bhanwar Angoori Piye" - Usha Mangeshkar
