= Raaj Mahal =

- Directed by: K.Parvez
- Written by: S. M. Abbas
- Produced by: K.B. Lamchhane
- Starring: Vinod Khanna; Neetu Singh; Danny Denzongpa; Amjad Khan
- Edited by: J.M. Kunnu
- Music by: Kalyanji Anandji
- Release date: 17 September 1982
- Country: India
- Language: Hindi

Raaj Mahal is a 1982 Hindi film. Produced by K.B. Lamchhane and directed by K.Parvez. The film stars Vinod Khanna, Neetu Singh, Danny Denzongpa in lead roles and Amjad Khan as main antagonist. The film's music is by Kalyanji Anandji

== Plot ==
Maharaja Uday Singh is the king of Ajaygarh. He has two sons, Vikram and Sangram. One day, the sly minister Durjan Singh assassinates the king. Durjan Singh sends his men to eliminate the king's family. The King's loyal man runs away with the queen and the children. The queen jumps into the river with her younger son and both fall apart. On the other hand, Khan handed over the eldest son to a tribe chief and dies. Vikram grows up and fights for justice against Durjan Singh. Sangram becomes a dacoit. Both brothers face off against each other.

== Cast ==
- Vinod Khanna as Rajkumar Vikram Singh
- Neetu Singh as Rajkumari Ratna Singh
- Danny Denzongpa as Rajkumar Sangram Singh
- Amjad Khan as Maharaj Durjan Singh
- Kader Khan as Khan
- Om Shivpuri as Sardar Badshah Khan
- Jagdeep as Veer Singh: Durjan's son
- Urmila Bhatt as Rajmata (Vikram & Sangram's Mother)
- Rammohan Sharma as Zalim Singh
- Yusuf Khan as Sher Singh
- Jayashree T as Dancer
- Arpana Chaudhary
- Suhel
- Balbeer
- Bhushan Tiwari
- Madup Sharma
- Ayub Khan
- Prem Kumar
- D. S. Raja

== Music ==
=== Track listing ===
All lyrics are written by Verma Malik; all music is composed by Kalyanji Anandji.

No.	Title	Singer(s)	Length
1.	"Mere Pyaar Ki Aavaaz Pe Chali Aanaa"	Lata Mangeshkar, Mohammed Rafi	4:00
2.	"Tere Dil Se Teri Mehfil Se"	Hemlata, Asha Bhosle	4:50
3.	"Mere Pyaar Ki Aavaaz Pe - Part 2"	Lata Mangeshkar, Mohammed Rafi	4:33
4.	"Kya Se Kya Ho Jaye"	Kishore Kumar, Mahendra Kapoor	4:00
5.	"Maine Pee Hai Janab"	Lata Mangeshkar	3:40
6.	"Aayi Hai Pyar Ki Bahar"	Asha Bhosle	3:00
Total length:			24:03
