= International Athletic Meeting in Honor of Miner's Day =

- Date: July
- Location: Ob Jezeru City Stadium, Velenje, Slovenia
- Event type: Track and field
- Established: 1995

The International Athletic Meeting in Honor of Miner's Day is an annual track and field meet that takes place at Ob Jezeru City Stadium in Velenje, Slovenia. It was first held in 1995. The most recent edition took place in 2017.

== Meeting records ==
=== Men ===
Men's meeting records of the International Athletic Meeting in Honor of Miner's Day
Event	Record	Athlete	Nationality	Date	Ref.
100 m	9.94 (+0.9 m/s)	Wayde van Niekerk	South Africa	20 June 2017	
200 m	20.32	Isaac Makwala	Botswana		
400 m	45.09	Pavel Maslák	Czech Republic	1 July 2015	
800 m	1:44.19	Amel Tuka	Bosnia and Herzegovina	1 July 2015	
3000 m	8:27.54	Vid Tršan	Slovenia	1 July 2015	
5000 m	13:22.75	David Bett	Kenya		
Long jump	8.13 m	Gregor Cankar	Slovenia		
Long jump	8.13 m	Rogerio Bispo	Brazil		
Shot put	20.26 m	Tomasz Majewski	Poland	1 July 2015	
Discus throw	65.63 m	Michael Möllenbeck	Germany		
Hammer throw	82.37 m	Paweł Fajdek	Poland		
Javelin throw	81.82 m	Hamish Peacock	Australia	20 June 2017	

=== Women ===
Women's meeting records of the International Athletic Meeting in Honor of Miner's Day
Event	Record	Athlete	Nationality	Date	Ref.
100 m	12.13 (+0.2 m/s)	Tina Jureš	Slovenia	1 July 2015	
200 m	23.22 (−0.3 m/s)	Maja Mihalinec	Slovenia	1 July 2015	
400 m	51.03	Ana Gabriela Guevara	Mexico		
1500 m	4:07.34	Amela Terzić	Serbia		
100 m hurdles	12.96	Marina Tomić	Slovenia		
3000 m steeplechase	9:50.19	Mohamed Bezuayehu	Ethiopia	1 July 2015	
Pole vault	4.70	Svetlana Feofanova	Russia		
Long jump	6.90	Olga Kucherenko	Russia		
Discus throw	69.58 m	Sandra Perković	Croatia	20 June 2017	
Hammer throw	71.75 m	Yipsi Moreno	Cuba		
Javelin throw	67.98 m	Mariya Abakumova	Russia		
