= Farishta Ya Qatil =

- Directed by: S. M. Abbas
- Written by: S. M. Abbas
- Produced by: Ziaul Hasan; Mohd Ilyas
- Starring: Shashi Kapoor; Rekha
- Music by: Kalyanji-Anandji
- Distributed by: Parasmani Chitrashala
- Release date: 1977
- Country: India
- Language: Hindi

Farishta Ya Qatil is a 1977 Bollywood action film directed by S. M. Abbas. The film stars Shashi Kapoor and Rekha.

== Cast ==
- Shashi Kapoor
- Rekha
- Jayshree T.
- Yunus Parvez
- Utpal Dutt
- Bindu
- Sujit Kumar
- Mac Mohan
- Prem Nath
- Om Shivpuri
- Johnny Walker

== Soundtrack ==
All songs are written by Anjaan.

#	Song	Singer
1	"Ishq Mein Tum To Jaan Se Guzar Jayenge"	Kishore Kumar, Anuradha Paudwal, Mohammed Rafi, Usha Mangeshkar
2	"Arey, Baaton Ke Hum Badshah"	Mohammed Rafi
3	"Kahin Dekha Na Dekha Shabaab Aisa"	Mohammed Rafi, Asha Bhosle
4	"Kaali Kaali Zulfon Mein Kas Loongi Raja"	Anuradha Paudwal, Usha Timothy
5	"Kuch Aise Bandhan Hote Hai Jo Bin Baandhe Bandh Jaati Hai"	Lata Mangeshkar, Mukesh
6	"Tasveer Hai Yeh Pyar Ki, Tasveer Na Becho"	Mukesh
