= Sultanat =

- Theatrical release poster
- Directed by: Mukul S. Anand
- Screenplay by: Mukul S. Anand
- Dialogues by: Kader Khan
- Story by: Mukul S. Anand
- Produced by: Arjun Hingorani
- Starring: Dharmendra; Sunny Deol; Sridevi; Juhi Chawla; Karan Kapoor; Tom Alter; Amrish Puri; Shakti Kapoor
- Narrated by: Raza Murad
- Cinematography: Pravin Bhatt
- Edited by: David Dhawan
- Music by: Kalyanji–Anandji
- Production company: Kapleshwar Productions
- Distributed by: Eros International
- Release date: 11 March 1986
- Country: India
- Language: Hindi

Sultanat (transl. Empire) is a 1986 Hindi-language epic action-adventure film written and directed by Mukul S. Anand. The film stars Dharmendra, Sunny Deol, Sridevi, Juhi Chawla and Karan Kapoor, supported by Tom Alter, Amrish Puri, Shakti Kapoor and Dalip Tahil.

It was the debutfilm of both Juhi Chawla (Miss India 1984) and Karan Kapoor (son of Shashi Kapoor). It was the first film in which Dharmendra appeared onscreen with his son Sunny Deol. Earlier they had both appeared in the 1984 film Sunny but did not share any scenes together.

== Plot ==
Shah is the king of Sultanat-e-Amaaz, a Sultanat (Sultanate) in Middle-Eastern Asia. When a bandit tribe leader, Razoulli Al-Jabber Al-Nasser, attacks Amaaz, the Sultanat's army, led by Lieutenant Khalid, fights back and defeats the enemy. Razoulli escapes, but not before abducting Khalid's pregnant wife, Ayesha. Ayesha gives birth to a son but dies during childbirth. A midwife proclaims that the boy is blessed and destined to one day become the Sultan (King) of Amaaz. Hearing this, Razoulli, whose wife has been unable to give him a male heir, decides to keep the baby for himself. He tells Khalid that both his wife and child died, then names the boy Sultan and raises him as his own, teaching him all the skills of a warrior.

Meanwhile, Khalid remarries an American journalist, Jane, and has another son, Samir, who is sent abroad for his safety and education. Now a General, Khalid vows to kill Razoulli. Sultan grows up to be a powerful warrior and a capable leader of his people.

One day, while Princess Yasmeen, the beautiful daughter of the King Shah, is on a cavalcade, Sultan dares to look into her eyes. When she commands him to bow, he refuses and instead smooches her. In retaliation, Yasmeen has her troops capture him. She tortures him in the prison. To further punish him, she forces him to enter a death race being conducted by her cousin, Shah’s nephew, Shakkir. Sultan escapes and abducts Yasmeen. After a series of sensual clashes, they fall madly in love.

Soon after, General Khalid kills Razoulli, and Razoulli's wife loses her mind. Sultan, unaware of his true parentage, swears to avenge his "father"’s death and learns that Khalid is responsible. Meanwhile, King Shah announces his intention to marry Princess Yasmeen to Khalid's son. This decision enrages Shakkir, who secretly plans to become the future king of Sultanat-e-Amaaz by marrying Princess Yasmeen himself.

Sultan finds out that Khalid’s son, Samir, and his girlfriend, Zarina, are arriving soon and plans to abduct them. Khalid learns of Sultan’s plan and decides to kill him. When Samir and Zarina arrive, Sultan overpowers them with an intention to kill Samir, but they manage to escape when Khalid comes to their rescue. However, Khalid is captured by Sultan's men.

The two men agree to a duel to the death. Khalid is unaware that Sultan is his long-lost son, the one he was told had died so many years ago. It seems now that this father-son duel will only end when one of them is killed by the other.

== Cast ==
- Dharmendra as General Khalid – Sultan and Samir’s father, Chief of Sultanat-e-Amaaz's military
- Sunny Deol as Sultan Pirzada – Khalid’s elder son, Princess Yasmeen’s boyfriend
- Sridevi as Princess Yasmeen – King Shah’s daughter, Sultan’s nemesis, and later his girlfriend
- Juhi Chawla as Zarina – Samir’s girlfriend
- Karan Kapoor as Samir – Khalid’s younger son, Zarina’s boyfriend
- Tom Alter as Shah – King of Sultanat-e-Amaaz, Princess Yasmeen’s father
- Amrish Puri as Razoulli Al-Jabber Al-Nasser
- Shakti Kapoor as Shakkir – Shah’s nephew
- Dalip Tahil as Janna – Sultan’s friend
- Neeta Mehta as Ayesha – Khalid’s first wife, Sultan’s mother
- Madeleine Cahill as Jane – Khalid’s second wife (after his first wife’s death), Samir’s mother
- Padma Khanna as Razoulli’s wife
- Tej Sapru as Zafar – Zarina’s elder brother
- Jugal Hansraj as the boy under the patronage of Sultan
- Arjun Hingorani as Fakeer

== Music and soundtrack ==
Sultanat (Original Motion Picture Soundtrack)

Soundtrack album by Kalyanji–Anandji
- Released: March 1986
- Recorded: 1985–1986
- Genres: Motion picture soundtrack, filmi
- Length: 30:50
- Language: Hindi
- Label: T-Series
- Producer: Kalyanji–Anandji
External audio
- Sultanat: Jano Janam Janeman on YouTube
- Sultanat: Yaara Dilbar Dildara on YouTube
- Sultanat: Kya Hoon Main Too Jane Na on YouTube
- Sultanat: Nazar Ne Nazar Se Kya Kaha on YouTube
- Sultanat: Too Hai Kamaal on YouTube
- Sultanat: Dance Music on YouTube

Kalyanji–Anandji composed the music of the film. The lyrics of the songs were penned by Anjaan and Hasan Kamal.

Track listing
No.	Title	Singer(s)	Length
1.	"Jano Janam Janeman"	Asha Bhosle, Shabbir Kumar	4:55
2.	"Yaara Dilbar Dildara"	Asha Bhosle	6:22
3.	"Kya Hoon Main Too Jane Na"	Asha Bhosle	4:48
4.	"Nazar Ne Nazar Se Kya Kaha"	Sadhana Sargam, Suresh Wadkar	4:48
5.	"Too Hai Kamaal"	Suresh Wadkar	7:48
6.	"Dance Music"	Instrumental	2:09
Total length:			30:50
