= Karishma Kudrat Kaa =

1985 film by Sunil Hingorani

- Poster
- Directed by: Sunil Hingorani
- Produced by: Arjun Hingorani
- Starring: Dharmendra; Mithun Chakraborty; Rati Agnihotri; Anita Raj; Shakti Kapoor; Saeed Jaffrey
- Music by: Kalyanji Anandji
- Release date: 6 December 1985
- Running time: 130 minutes
- Country: India
- Language: Hindi

Karishma Kudrat Kaa (transl. Miracle of Nature) is a 1985 Hindi-language Indian film directed by Sunil Hingorani, starring Dharmendra and Anita Raj in lead roles with Mithun Chakraborty, Rati Agnihotri, Shakti Kapoor, and Saeed Jaffrey in supporting roles.

== Plot ==
Vijay is a simple-minded widower who lives in a small rural town in India with his unmarried sister, Radha his son and his widowed mother. Radha is soon to be married to Sub Inspector Raj. One day Vijay witnesses a killing of a young child by notorious bandit Bhagad Singh, and chides him. As a result, Bhagad and his gang severely beat him up, and only spare his life after Vijay's mom begs them to forgive him. But Lala Dayaluram hires Bhagad to ensure that Vijay and his family leave the town, and when they refuse Vijay is abducted, severely beaten and left for dead and the other side escaped convict and killer named Karan, who was Vijay's lookalike, finds Vijay in unconscious condition, and decides to assume his identity, stabs him, and throws him to his death from atop a cliff. Karan then goes to live with his family. The motive for Karan to live here is merely to hide under Vijay's name until the police give up their manhunt for him. No one really notices the change in Vijay. Karan starts to frequent the nearby brothel run by Kammobai, and soon realizes that he can make much money by selling young women to her. His first target that he intends to lure to Kammobai is none other than Radha, Vijay's sister. This is just one of the destructive methods he intends to employ in his new identity and there is no one who can dare to suspect nor stop him.

Paro a village girl and step sister of Raj who was actually made to marry with Vijay. When Karan meets her he falls in love with her and also discloses his true identity that he is not Vijay, only Paro knows that he is not Vijay. Another side police department also shocked by sudden disappearance of Karan.

One day Bhagad Singh comes with his gang and try to beat Karan thinking him as Vijay. Karan was unaware about Bhagad Singh. Raj and Karan both gets gathered and makes them to run away from there Karan shoots on Bhagad Singh's one eye and he becomes blind.

After a days Raj observes Vijay's face and doubts that he is Karan. In temple Karan was trying to marry with Paro. Suddenly Raj comes with department and arrest him and tells Paro that he is not Vijay his Karan who looks like him, in front of the police Karan pretends to know nothing about himself. Karan puts duplicate fingerprint on his hand and escapes from fhe police. As soon as coming from jail he marries Paro and makes his sister and his mother happy. Radha and Raj marry and on the same day Raj resigns his job to catch Karan and revenge.

But Karan feels bad that he has resigned his job and he accepts the truth that he is Karan not Vijay and tells their family that Vijay is no more and he is dead. Vijay's mother feels bad galls on Karan. Police arrests Karan and he was in jail. But actually Vijay was alive, when Karan thrown him from hills Vijay was got to group of Sadhus and he was treated homeopathic treatment and he was saved. Vijay regains consciousness and recovers, making his son happy.

Unfortunately Bhagad Singh and his gang arrives and kidnaps Vijay and his son. Paro goes to jail and she tells him everything. Karan tries to escape from jail but the police shoot him in the stomach but he escapes and comes to spot of Bhagad Singh in injury condition to save Vijay and his son. In fight Bhagad Singh tries to knock Karan but he was able to beat and kill Bhagad Singh and his gang in bloody fight. He removes Vijay son from the cage in which Bhagad Singh had confined him, sends him near to Vijay and dies in front of everyone, all feels sad and gets emotional. Everyone attends Karan's funeral and cremation.

== Cast ==
- Dharmendra as Vijay/Karan (double role)
- Mithun Chakraborty as Sub-Inspector Raj/Radha's husband
- Rati Agnihotri as Radha/Vijay's sister
- Anita Raj as Paro
- Urmila Bhatt as Vijay's mother
- Saeed Jaffrey as Lala Dayaluram
- Shakti Kapoor as Daciat Sardar Bhagad Singh
- Padma Khanna as the mother of the dead child
- Jankidas as Seth Jankidas, a jeweller
- Dinesh Hingoo as Kammobai's patron
- Praveen Kumar as Zoravar
- Lalita Kumari as Kammobai
- Mehmood Jr. as Dayaluram's assistant
- Raj Mehra as Mahadev
- Ram Mohan as Robert
- Murad as Guru
- Jagdish Raj as Inspector General of Police
- Prem Sagar as Police Commissioner
- Padma Khanna as Widow, and mother of the slain child
- Manik Irani as Rangaraj
- Deep Dhillon as Dacait Shera, henchman of Bhagad Singh

== Soundtrack ==
#	Title	Singer(s)
1	"Tere Vadon Pe"	Sadhana Sargam
2	"Dil Mein Paheli"	Anwar, Sadhana Sargam
3	"Ek Din Milkar"	Manhar Udhas, Sadhana Sargam
4	"Hum Dono Hain"	Suresh Wadkar, Sadhana Sargam
5	"Kahin Tu Woh To Nahin"	Udit Narayan, Sadhana Sargam
6	"Ek Din Milkar v2"	Manhar Udhas
