= Charandas =

1977 film directed by B.S. Thapa

- Poster
- Directed by: B.S. Thapa
- Produced by: Kunwar Mohinder Singh Bedi Sahar
- Starring: Om Prakash; Lakshmi; Vikram Makandar; Urmila Bhatt; Amitabh Bachchan; Dharmendra; Sunil Dutt; Manorama; Farida Jalal; Raj Mehra
- Music by: Rajesh Roshan
- Release date: 21 October 1977
- Country: India
- Language: Hindi

Charandas is a 1977 Bollywood film directed by B.S. Thapa, starring Om Prakash, Urmila Bhatt, Lakshmi, Vikram Makandar, Farida Jalal and Raj Mehra, in lead roles.

== Synopsis ==
The entire plot is woven around Indian family values, enterprise and meteoric rise in business.

Charandas lives with his dutiful, religious wife Kamla and their two children, running a mechanic workshop that over a span of 10 years, becomes an engineering empire. Soon money clouds the eyes of his family members, to the extent that his dutiful wife and loving children are transformed into bad-mannered party animals, even holding parties to celebrate the birthday and marriage of their dog. Shocked by their change in behavior, Charandas leaves his home for hotels and factory rest houses. Lonely housewife Lalli accidentally meets Charandas in a distraught state, having been abandoned by her mean and selfish husband Ashokh, a small-time stage actor living with his mistress Sheetal. Charandas and Lalli decide to teach their respective family members a lesson and team up to act as a lovey dovey couple, Lalli spoilt by numerous shopping extravaganzas and holiday trips to places like Kashmir, and Charandas as the doting lover.

Sheetal drives away Vikram from her home, seeing his dubious standards of introducing his wife Laxmi as his maid servant. Meanwhile, Kamla invites Vikram to move into Charandas' mansion and sues Charandas with the help of Vikram and family friend Aslam. They scheme to hire a photographer, Pinto, to prove that Charandas has become mentally ill, and take over his business empire. However, Charandas spoils the scheme by bequeathing his entire empire to his workers as shareholders. He also reveals that he had taken Lalli only to be a daughter, which was misunderstood due to the mentality of their cheating spouses.

The story ends with both families reunited and Indian celluloid themes being typified once again.

== Cast ==
- Om Prakash as Charandas
- Urmila Bhatt as Charandas's wife, Kamla.
- Lakshmi as Lalli
- Vikram Makandar as Ashokh
- Amitabh Bachchan ... Qawwali Singer (Special appearance)
- Dharmendra ... Qawwali Singer (Special appearance)
- Sunil Dutt as Lawyer Tandon (Special appearance)
- Manorama as Anglo-Indian mother of six daughters
- Farida Jalal as Vilasiya
- Raj Mehra as Aslam

== Soundtrack ==
The music was composed by Rajesh Roshan and the songs were written by Rajinder Krishan.

#	Title	Singer(s)
1	"Yeh Zamana Agar Raah Roke"	Kishore Kumar, Asha Bhosle
2	"Dil Ki Lagi Aesi Lagi"	Asha Bhosle
3	"Han Dekh Lo Ishq Ka Martava"	Aziz Nazan Qawwal, Yesudas
4	"Kuchh Soch Ke Pyar Kiya Hai"	Mohammed Rafi, Asha Bhosle
5	"O Maiya Mori Main Nahin Makhan"	Mukesh
