= Lalita Kumari =

Indian politician

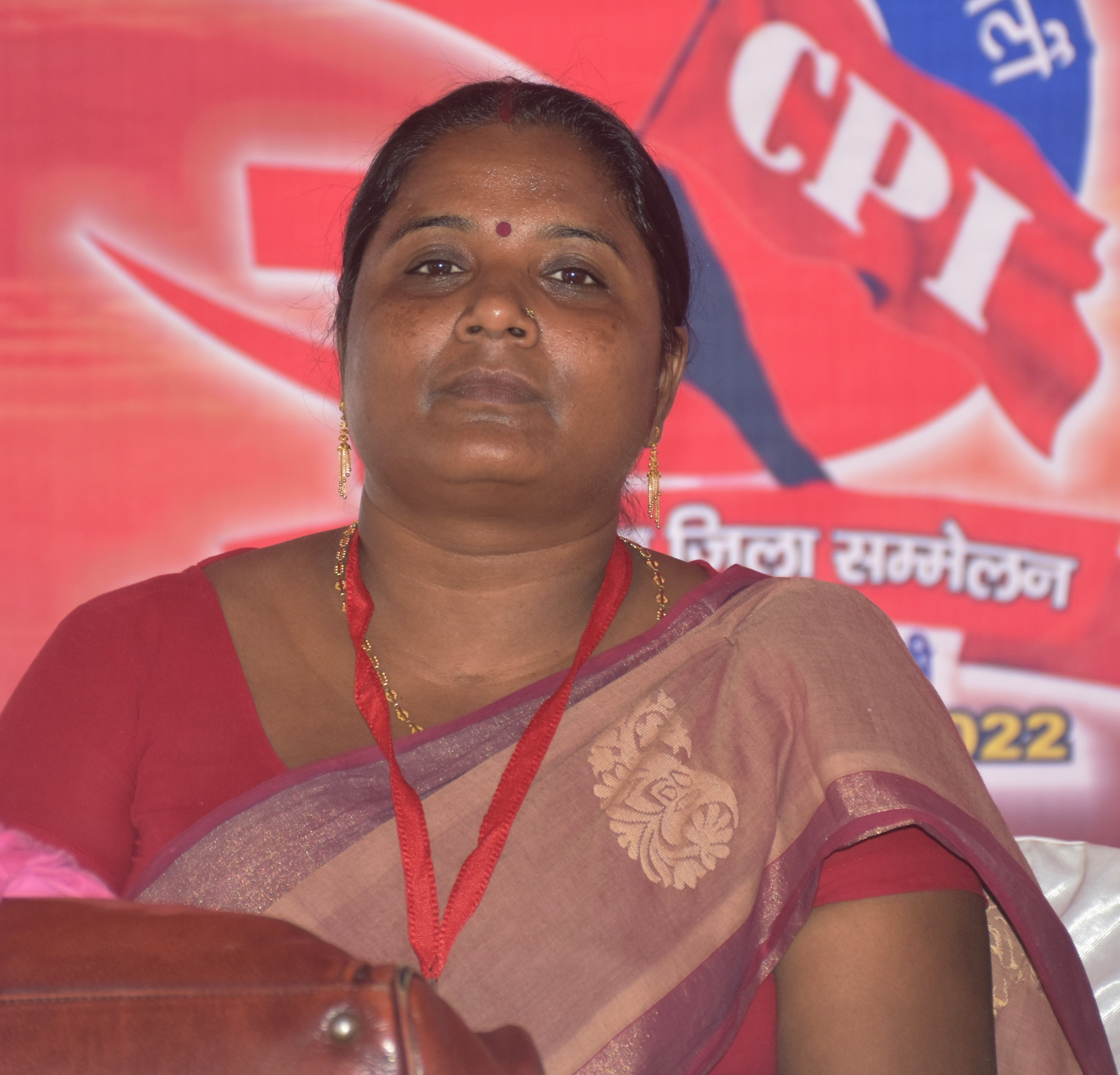
- Lalita Kumari at CPI conference, Begusarai, 2022
- Born: July 25, 1988 (age 38); Begusarai, Bihar, India
- Occupations: Social and political activism
- Known for: Secretary of Bihar Mahila Samaj; CPI Leader
- Office: Member of National Council, CPI and NFIW
- Political party: Communist Party of India

Lalita Kumari (born 25 July 1988) is an Indian politician and social activist from Bihar. She is a member of the National Council of the Communist Party of India (CPI).

Lalita Kumari serves as the Secretary of Bihar Mahila Samaj, a state-level women's organization affiliated with the National Federation of Indian Women. She is also a member of the National Council of NFIW.

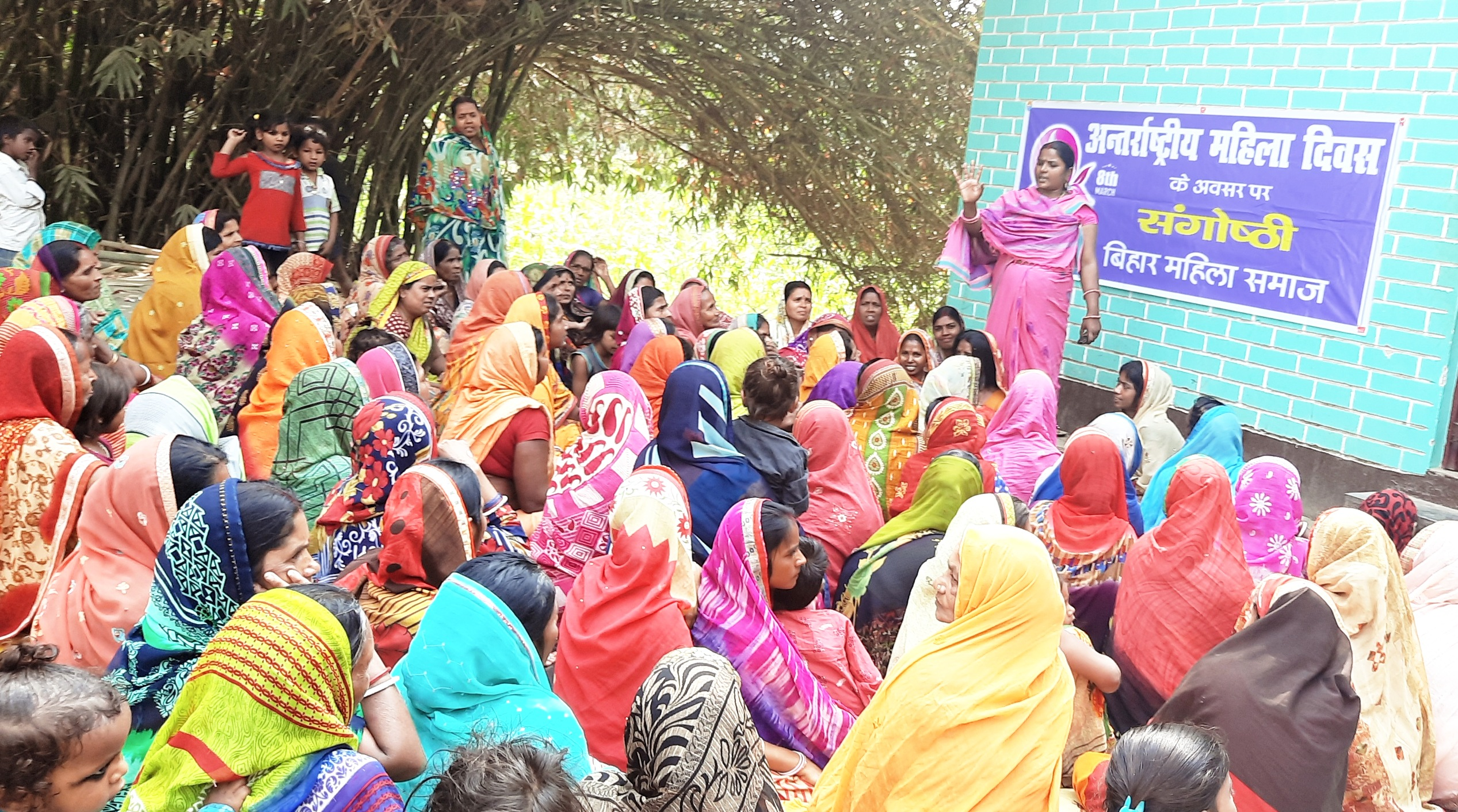
Lalita Kumari addressing a seminar on the occasion of International Women's Day on 8 March 2021 at Sahebpur Kamal, Begusarai

In 2016, Lalita Kumari was elected as the Mukhiya (village head) of the Gram Panchayat Panchveer, Sahebpur Kamal in Begusarai District, Bihar. She is actively working to promote women's rights and gender equality. Through various campaigns, she has raised awareness against social evils such as child labor, child marriage, dowry, and female foeticide. She is also actively involved in addressing major issues like domestic violence and social discrimination. She has led awareness programs in rural areas to encourage social acceptance of inter-caste marriages.
