= Kab? Kyoon? Aur Kahan? =

1970 film directed by Arjun Hingorani

- Movie Poster
- Directed by: Arjun Hingorani
- Written by: S. M. Abbas
- Screenplay by: Dhruva Chatterjee
- Story by: Arjun Hingorani
- Produced by: Arjun Hingorani
- Starring: Dharmendra; Babita; Pran; Dhumal
- Cinematography: K Vaikunth
- Edited by: Anant Apte
- Music by: Kalyanji Anandji
- Distributed by: Kapleshwar Films
- Release date: 1970
- Running time: 135 mins
- Country: India
- Language: Hindi

Kab? Kyoon? Aur Kahan? (Note: The phrase translates as "When? Why? And Where?" The questions are in reference to a murder that occurs in the movie) is a 1970 Bollywood mystery film directed and produced by Arjun Hingorani. The film stars Dharmendra, Babita and Pran. It is inspired by the French classic film Les Diaboliques (1955) which itself is based on the 1952 novel She Who Was No More by Boileau-Narcejac.

== Cast ==
- Dharmendra as C.I.D. Inspector Anand
- Babita Kapoor as Asha Prasad
- Pran as Daljit Prasad
- Helen as Rita
- Murad as Rai Bahadur Jagdish Prasad
- Asit Sen as Constable Hanuman Prasad
- Jankidas as Masoom Ali
- Hari Shivdasani as Police Superintendent Gupta
- Dhumal as Stewart
- Mohan Choti as a taxi driver
- Arjun Hingorani as Bihari
- Ashoo as Lata

== Soundtrack ==
Lyrics written by Anjaan and Indeevar.

| Song | Singer |
|---|---|
| "Ho Gaye Tere Ho Gaye, Pyar Mein Tere Kho Gaye" | Lata Mangeshkar |
| "Dil To Dil Hai Kisi Din Machal Jaayega" | Mohammed Rafi |
| "Pyar Se Dil Bhar De, Hum Pe Karam Kar De" | Asha Bhosle, Mohammed Rafi |
| "Yeh Aankhen Jhuki Jhuki Si, Yeh Saansen Ruki Ruki Si" | Asha Bhosle, Usha Khanna |
