= Katilon Ke Kaatil =

- Film poster
- Directed by: Arjun Hingorani
- Produced by: Arjun Hingorani
- Starring: Dharmendra; Rishi Kapoor; Zeenat Aman; Tina Munim; Nirupa Roy; Shakti Kapoor; Amjad Khan; Bruce Le
- Cinematography: Kishore Rege
- Music by: Kalyanji-Anandji
- Release date: 11 December 1981
- Running time: 165 minutes
- Country: India
- Language: Hindi

Katilon Ke Kaatil (transl. "A Murderer's Murderer") is a 1981 Indian Hindi-language action thriller film, produced and directed by Arjun Hingorani. This film stars Dharmendra, Rishi Kapoor, Zeenat Aman, Tina Munim, Nirupa Roy, Shakti Kapoor and Amjad Khan. The music is by Kalyanji Anandji. The film is known for its music and several exploitation film gimmicks, including the appearance of Bruce Lee lookalike Bruce Le (capitalizing on the Bruceploitation trend) as well as a character called Reecha who resembles General Ursus from Planet of the Apes.

Katilon Ke Katil was released on 11 December 1981, and was a critical and commercial success, becoming the 7th highest grossing film of 1981.

== Cast ==
- Dharmendra as Ajit / Badshah
- Rishi Kapoor as Ashok/Munna
- Zeenat Aman as Jameela Banu
- Tina Munim as Rashmi
- Nirupa Roy Mrs. Radha Pratap Singh
- Shakti Kapoor as Jimmy / Micheal
- Amjad Khan as Black Cobra
- Bruce Le as Goon
- Arjun Hingorani as Fakeer
- Manorama as Lady with necklace
- Shamsuddin as Reecha
- Hera Lal as Munshi
- Keshto Mukherjee as Husband of the lady with necklace
- Shivraj as Jamila's Dad
- Pradeep Kumar as Pratap Singh: Ajeet and Munna's father (Dead)

== Soundtrack ==
Lyrics: Rajendra Krishan

Song	Singer
"Yak Bayak Koi Kahin Mil Jaata Hai"	Kishore Kumar, Asha Bhosle
"Sare Bazaar Karenge Pyar, Na Koi Parda, Na Deewar"	Kishore Kumar, Asha Bhosle
"O Meri Chorni, O Meri Morni" (Part 1)	Lata Mangeshkar, Mohammed Rafi
"O Meri Chorni, O Meri Morni" (Part 2)	Lata Mangeshkar, Mohammed Rafi
"Yeh To Allah Ko Khabar, Yeh To Maula Ko Khabar"	Mohammed Rafi
"Main Woh Chanda Nahin Jise Baadal Chhupa Le	Hemlata, Anwar
"Katilon Ke Kaatil Ki Dastaan Sunaani Hai"	Mahendra Kapoor, Aziz Nazan

== Reception and legacy ==
The film became a box office super hit. At the Indian box office, the film grossed ₹80 million (US$9.2 million) in 1981, equivalent to an estimated ₹4.2 billion (US$44 million) adjusted for inflation in 2026. (Note: Inflation rate from 1993 to 2017: 21.38 times: Aankhen's domestic nett of ₹12.845 crore in 1993 equivalent to ₹274.584584 crore in 2017.)

Retrospectively, the film is best known for its hit music and several exploitation film gimmicks. Capitalizing on Bruce Lee's popularity in India, the film exploited the Bruceploitation trend from Hong Kong action cinema, with the appearance of Bruce Lee lookalike Bruce Le in the film. It also featured a special character called Reecha, who was born of a woman and a wild bear, and resembles General Ursus from Planet of the Apes.
