= Dil Bhi Tera Hum Bhi Tere =

- Poster
- Directed by: Arjun Hingorani
- Written by: Bihari Masand (screenplay); Janardhan Muktidoot (dialogue, story)
- Produced by: Kanwar Kala Mandir; Bihari Masand
- Starring: Balraj Sahni; Dharmendra; Kumkum
- Cinematography: P. Isaac; Surendra Pai
- Edited by: Anant Apte
- Music by: Kalyanji Anandji
- Release date: 1960
- Running time: 147 min
- Country: India
- Language: Hindi
- Budget: ₹ 4 lakh

Dil Bhi Tera Hum Bhi Tere is a 1960 Hindi-language film, produced by Bihari Masand for Kanwar Kala Mandir and directed by Arjun Hingorani. The film stars Balraj Sahni, Dharmendra and Kumkum. The film was Dharmendra's debut film.

== Plot ==
Panchu Kumtekar lives a near-destitute lifestyle in Bombay along with his school-going brother, Shiri. He makes a living as a con-man, gambling and picking pockets with the assistance of another poverty-stricken male, Choti. He has a friend in Ashok who sells Cavendar cigarettes on busy streets by wearing stilts. One day, Ashok meets a maidservant, Sonu Mangeshkar, and they fall in love. Shiri is unable to pay his fees, and is expelled from school, but a local prostitute, Prema, comes to his assistance, much to the initial displeasure of Panchu. But he changes his mind eventually and accepts her help. In time, they fall in love and get married. Ashok is then employed as a boxer by Sonu's employer, starts earning enough money to support them all, and even moves into a three bedroom apartment, while Panchu decides to become honest and finds work as a peon. Then their lives are shattered when Sonu's Goa-based dad falls ill and she goes to visit him via a ship, which sinks, killing everyone on board. Ashok, depressed and devastated, decides not to box anymore. Panchu decides to revert to stealing. He unknowingly extorts money from the mother of Police Inspector Moti, is subsequently arrested, and jailed. Prema gets run over by a horse-carriage, and Shiri takes to selling candy on trains, tries to escape from a ticket-checker, and falls off a running train. Will Prema and Shiri recover? And, if yes, will their lifestyle ever improve?

== Cast ==
- Balraj Sahni as Panchu Dada
- Dharmendra as Ashok (credited as Dharmender)
- Kumkum as Sonu Mangeshkar
- Usha Kiran as Prema
- Sushil
- Mohan Choti as Choti
- Hari Shivdasani as Memsaab's Father
- Ishu Jagirdar as a Mahdu
- Draz
- Ishu
- Tun Tun as Moti's Mother
- Bajaj
- Ranvir Raj as Police Inspector Moti
- Khusal
- Jankidas as Jankidas - Teacher
- Baby Shobha as Shobha Jayant - Child Artist
- Kesari
- Fazlu
- Nazir Kashmiri
- Reddy
- Anoop as Shree Kumthekar - child artist

== Soundtrack ==
#	Title	Singer(s)	Raga
1	"Mujhko Is Raat Ki Tanhai Mein"	Mukesh	Bhairavi
2	"Yeh Wada Karen Hum"	Mukesh, Lata Mangeshkar	
3	"Ankhon Mein Tujhko Chhupake Sanam"	Lata Mangeshkar	
4	"Mujhko Is Raat Ki Tanhai Me Aawaaz Na Do (Female)"	Lata Mangeshkar	Bhairavi
5	"Ha Bura Kiya Hai Huzoor Maine"	Mukesh	
6	"Jitni Dil Ki Baat Chhupai"	Suman Kalyanpur	
7	"Aadmi Gareeb Ho Ya Amir Ho (Sambhalo Dil Zara, O Mister)"	Mahendra Kapoor, Geeta Dutt	
8	"Aaj Iski Hai To Kal Uski"	Shankar Dasgupta	
9	"Ek Do Dus, Upar Se Aai Bus"	Kamal Barot, Suman Kalyanpur	
10	"Shin Alif Dal Shadi Mere Yaar Ki"	Suman Kalyanpur	
