= Khel Khilari Ka =

- Directed by: Arjun Hingorani
- Written by: S. M. Abbas
- Music by: Kalyanji-Anandji
- Release date: 1977
- Country: India
- Language: Hindi

Khel Khilari Ka is a 1977 Indian Hindi-language action film directed by Arjun Hingorani.

== Cast ==
- Dharmendra ... Ajit
- Shabana Azmi ... Rachna
- Dhruv.... Shanker
- Dev Kumar... Sangram Singh
- Narendra Nath ... Sangram Singh's Son
- Mehmood Jr. ... Rahim
- Shakti Kapoor... Tony
- Komilla Wirk Laxmi
- Ravi
- Johnny Walker ... Khairatilal
- Sujata Bakshi (as Sujata)
- Bharat Bhushan ... Masterji
- Shyama ... Mrs. Khairatilal
- Hiralal ... Murli
- Jankidas ... Jankidas Karodimal

== Soundtrack ==
The songs on the film's soundtrack record were composed by Kalyanji–Anandji, written by Rajinder Krishan, and performed by Kishore Kumar, Lata Mangeshkar, Manna Dey, Asha Bhosle and Mukesh.

1. "Ek Bablu Puchhe Babli Se, Kya Puchhe Pagla Pagli Se" – Kishore Kumar, Lata Mangeshkar
2. "Sabak Pada Hai Jab Se" – Kishore Kumar, Manna Dey, Asha Bhosle, Kanchan
3. "Pyar Kaa Bandhan, Khun Kaa Rishta" – Mukesh, Lata Mangeshkar
4. "Ye Na Jane" – Mukesh, Lata Mangeshkar
5. "Is Kismat Ke Kaise, Rang Niraley" (Part 1) – Lata Mangeshkar, Mukesh
6. "Jaan Ab Ja Rahi Hai" – Asha Bhosle, Manna Dey
7. "Pyar Bada Hai Ya Jaan Badi Hai" – Lata Mangeshkar, Asha Bhosle
