= Faruk Kaiser =

Indian french poet and lyricist (1918–1987)

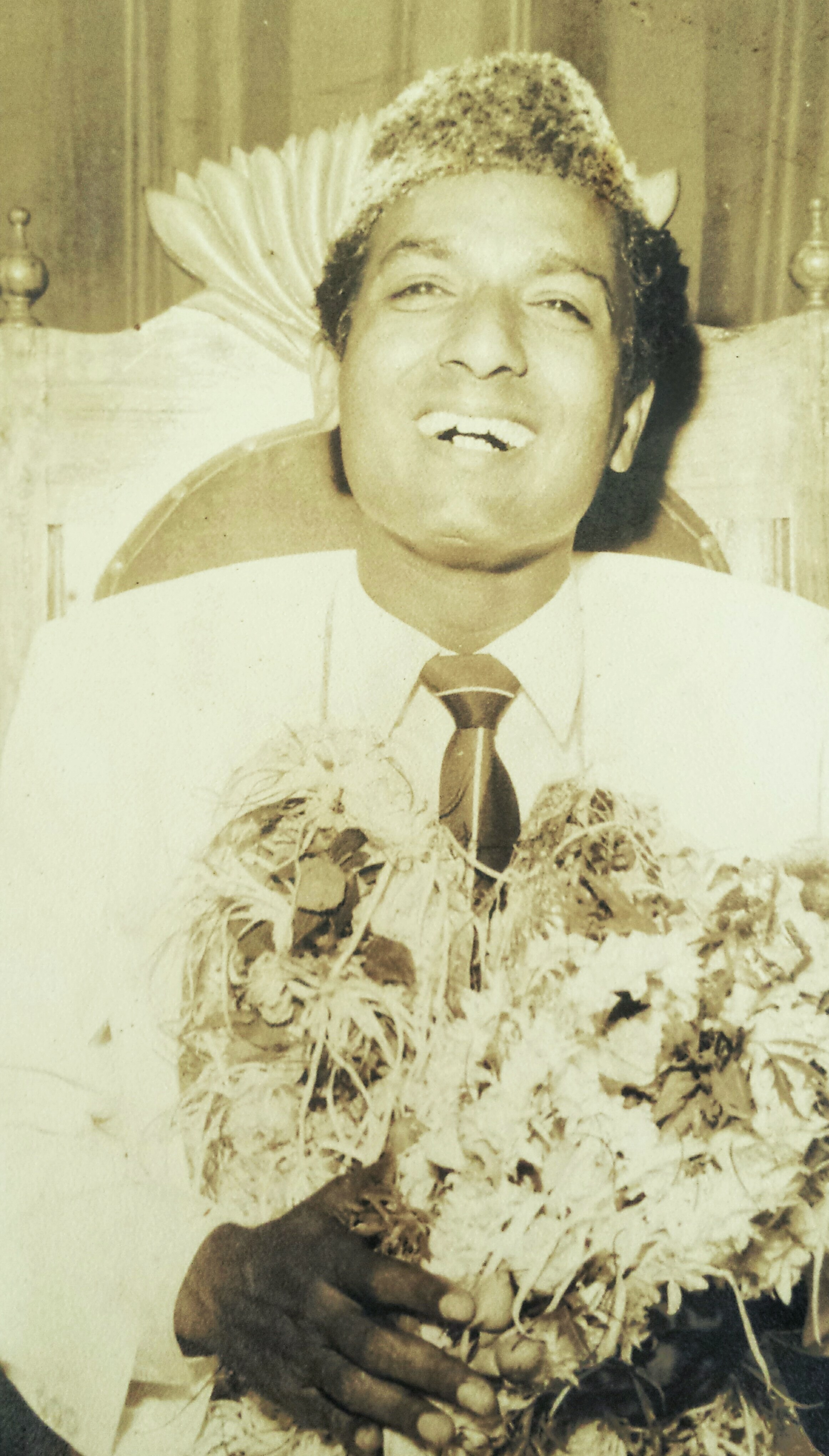
- Faruk Kaiser on his wedding day in 1959
- Born: June 6, 1918
- Died: November 10, 1987 (aged 69)
- Years active: 1949 – 1987
- Spouse: Aisha Mohan (m. 1959)
- Children: 3

Faruk Kaiser (6 June 1918 – 10 November 1987) was an Urdu poet and a renowned lyricist in India, making a significant contribution to the success of many Bollywood films. He was one of the dominating forces of music in Indian Cinema during the 1950s through the 1980s. He contributed to more than 115 movies and 390 songs.

== Early life ==
Faruk Kaiser was born in 1918 into a jeweller's family. He was to be the second eldest of 12 children and was educated in Bombay (present day Mumbai). Faruk had an enquiring mind and, even as a child, exhibited a keen interest in reading books and newspapers, and later in the wireless. Faruk's mother died when he was 18; shortly after that he left his family home and found lodgings in a friend's tailoring premises. Here, he devoted his time to further learning: immersing himself in poetry, literature, educational books, newspapers, magazines, and almost anything available in print, whilst also learning languages besides his native Urdu.

== Bollywood career ==
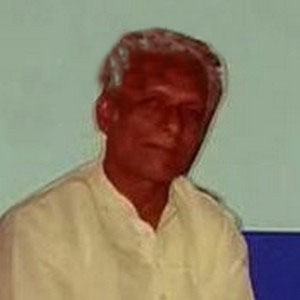
Faruk Kaiser

Faruk's love for poetry and his friendship with neighbour Kamran Khan (father of Farah Khan and Sajid Khan (director)) were instrumental in his developing an enthusiasm for the creative works of Hindi Cinema. While Kamran Khan produced and acted in films, Faruk was introduced into the Bollywood scene as an assistant director, whose expertise was frequently sought to modify dialogues and revamp scenes. He went on to direct several movies until he found his niche as a lyricist.

== Personal life ==
Among his many colleagues in the film industry, Faruk was a great friend of actor Kamal Mohan, who was the father of six sons and one daughter. Kamal Mohan proposed his daughter Aisha's hand in marriage to his dear friend and confidant Faruk- who took an immediate liking for her. During their courtship, he penned the lyrics of Sari Sari Raat Teri Yaad Sataye for the movie Aji Bas Shukriya (1958) while she was stricken with tuberculosis and hospitalised in Bombay for a year. Soon after Aisha's discharge from hospital in 1959, they married and moved to Bandra. Faruk's career had developed and his work took him all over India; during his many travels he wrote diligently to his wife and soulmate. It was during his travels, on a shoot in 1963, that he wrote the song Oee Ma Oee Ma Yeh Kya Ho Gaya for the movie Parasmani (1963)

Faruk and Aisha had three children, one son, Shakil (born 1960), and two daughters, Bilkis Whelan (1962–2003) and Tabassum (1963–1983).

== Awards ==
A respected Bollywood lyricist and a member of the Indian Performing Rights Society, Faruk Kaiser's laurels include:

- The Golden Disc to commemorate the 500,000 Unit Record Sale of the Sound Track of the film Qurbani in 1980 (Polydor)
- Double Platinum Disc for the movie Khudgarz in 1987 (Venus India Ltd)
- Double Platinum Disc for the movie Kudrat Ka Kanoon (Super Cassettes Industries Pvt Ltd)
- Platinum Disc for the movie Bhagwan Dada (Super Cassettes Industries Pvt. Ltd.)
- Platinum Disc for the movie Insaaf in 1987 (Venus India Ltd)
- Platinum Disc in recognition of outstanding sales performance (Gramophone Records and Tapes India Ltd.)
- Platinum Disc for Bappi's Music Lover in 1985 (Music India Ltd)

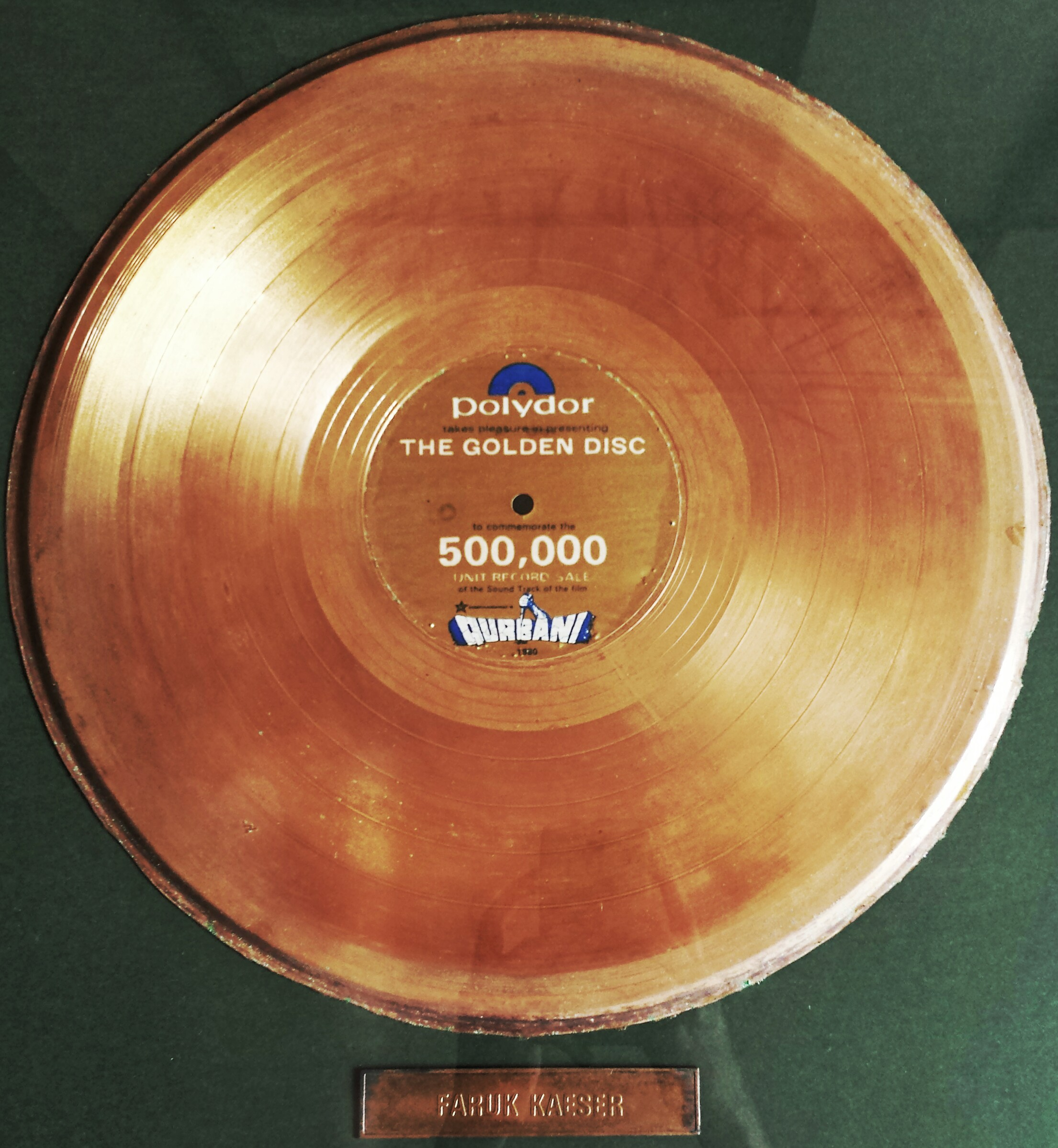
Faruk Kaiser's Golden Disc accolade for Qurbani

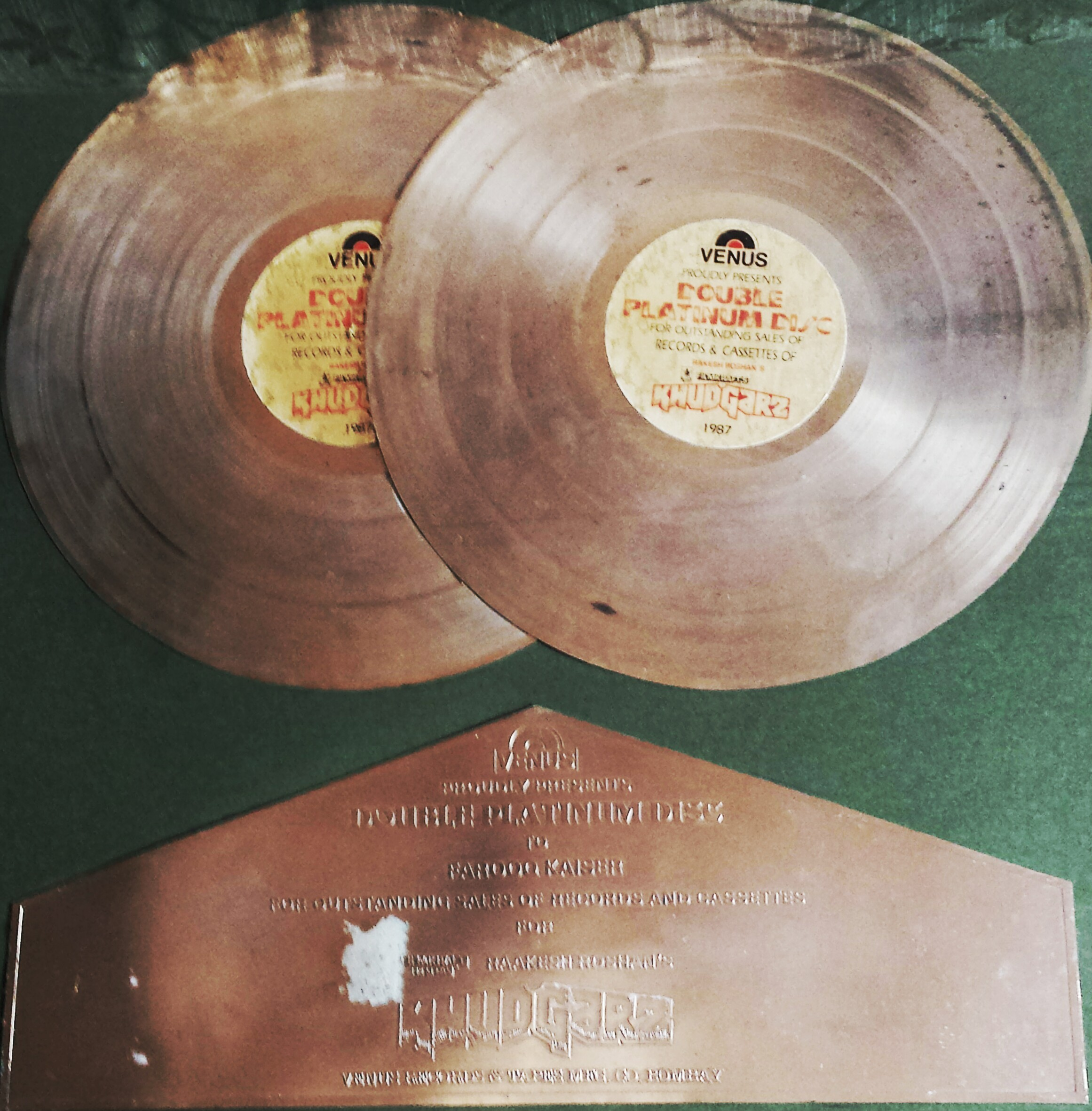
Faruk Kaiser's Double Platinum Disc accolade for Khudgarz

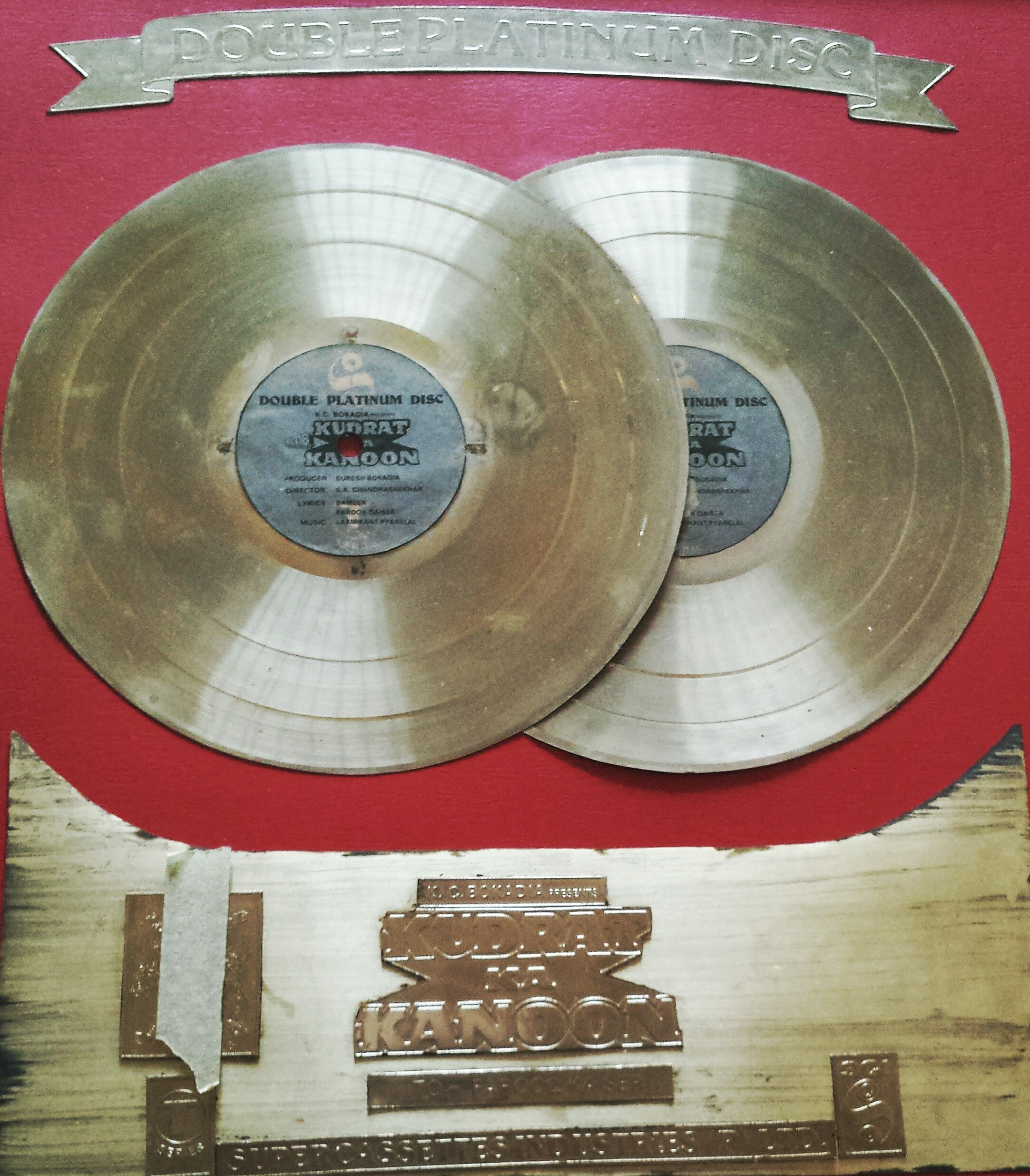
Faruk Kaiser's Double Platinum Disc accolade for Kudrat Ka Kanoon

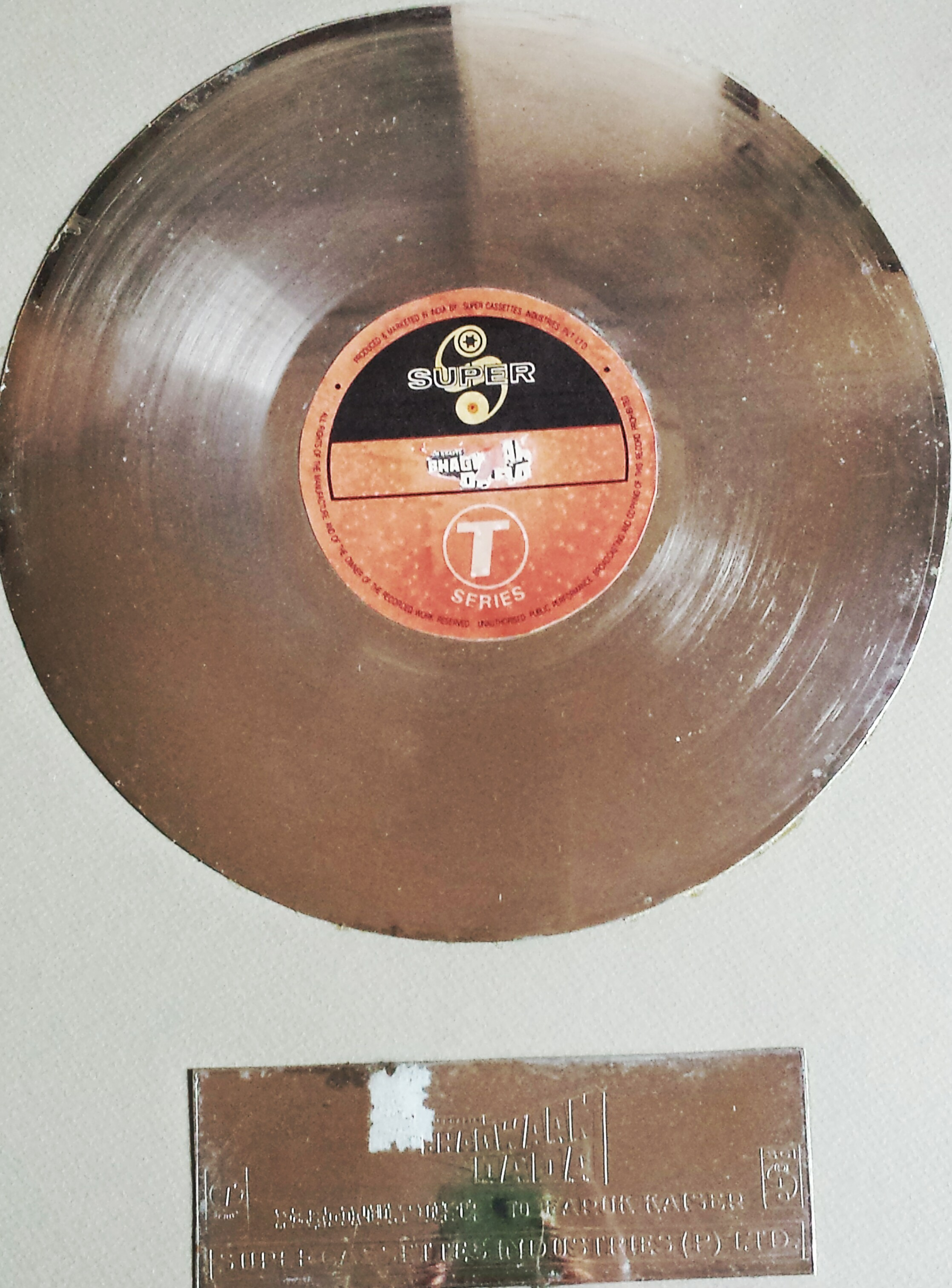
Faruk Kaiser's Platinum Disc accolade for Bhagwan Dada

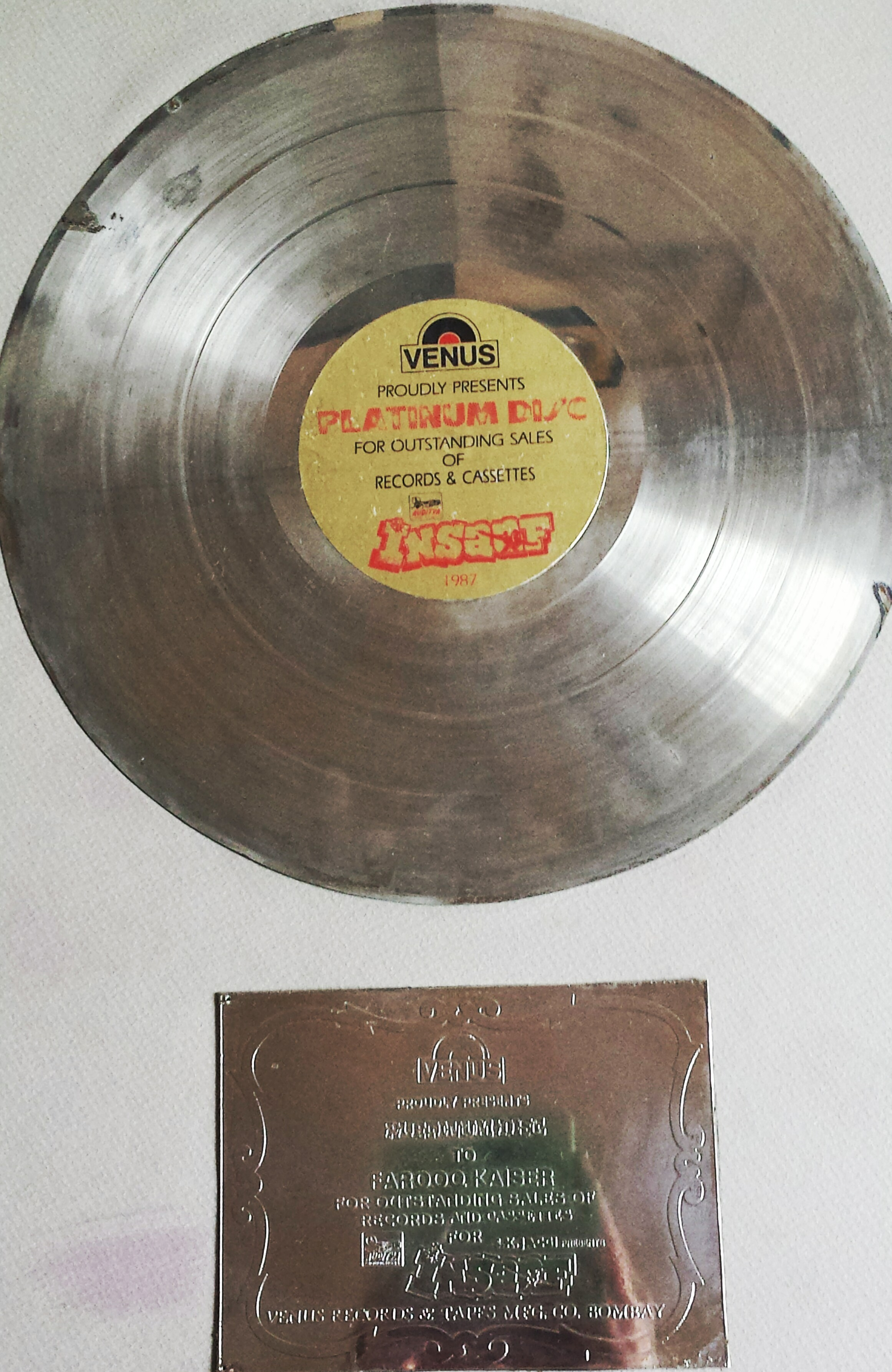
Faruk Kaiser's Platinum Disc accolade for Insaaf

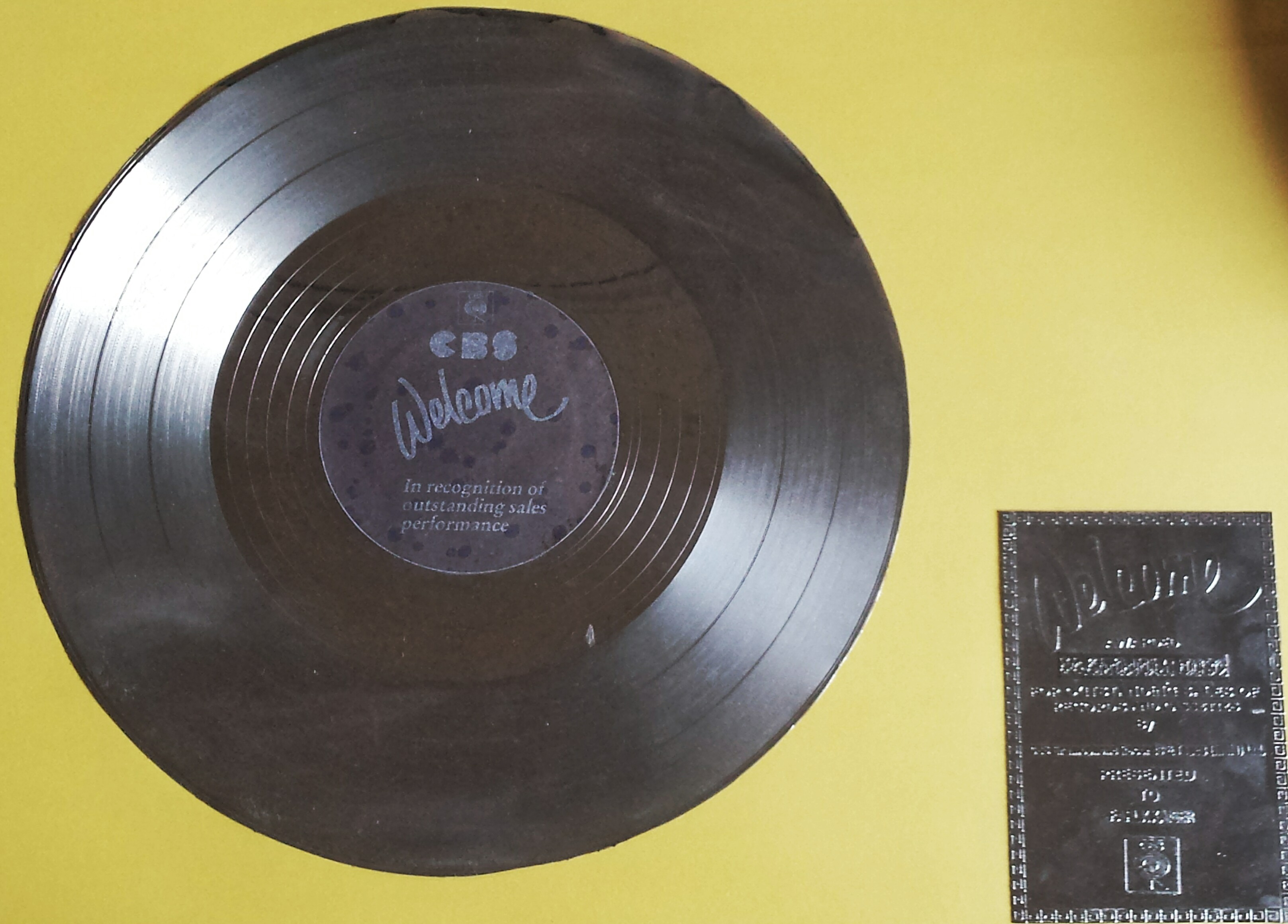
Faruk Kaiser's Platinum accolade recognition

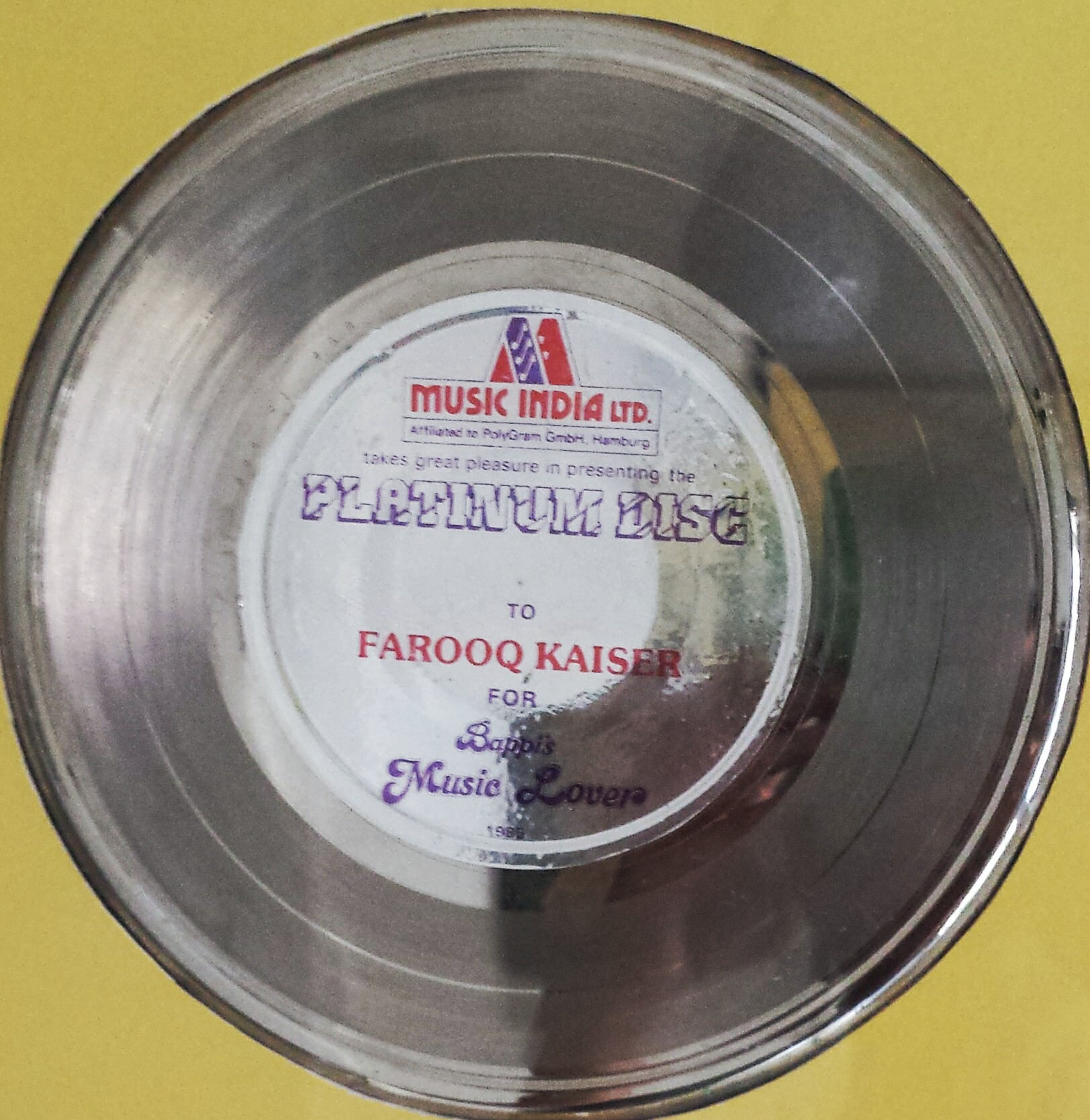
Faruk Kaiser's Platinum Disc for Bappi's Music Lover

== Filmography ==
Year	Film	Songs written	Music Director	Notes
1949	Rooplekha	2	Khan Mastana	Debut film
1950	Hanste Rahena	At least 3	Wadhwa	
1951	Simba	4	D. C. Dutt	
1952	Aazmaish	At least 2	J. D. Majumdar	
1952	Bama	At least 1	Nisar Bazmi	
1952	Vanraj	1	Shyam Babu Pathak	
1953	Malika Salomi	6 (All)	Krishna Dayal and Iqbal (separately)	
1954	Jadugar	4 (All)	Iqbal	
1955	Jasoos	2	Iqbal	
1955	Madhur Milan	1	Bulo C. Rani	
1955	Sakhi Lootera	6 (All)	Iqbal	
1956	Sipah Salar	6 (All)	Iqbal	
1958	Aji Bas Shukriya	3	Roshan Lal Nagrath	
1959	Madari	3	Kalyanji-Anandji	
1959	O Tera Kya Kahna	1	Kalyanji Veerji Shah	
1959	Toofani Teerandaz	At most 5	Iqbal	
1960	Choron Ki Baraat	1 or 2	Manohar Lal Sonik	
1960	Dekha Jaega	5 (All)	Sardul Singh Kwatra	
1960	Delhi Junction	1	Kalyanji-Anandji	
1960	Do Dost	2	Chandrakant	
1960	Qatil	6	Nashad	
1960	Teer Aur Talwar	6 (All)	Nisar Bazmi	
1961	Passport	1	Kalyanji-Anandji	
1962	Rooplekha	6 (All)	Nashad	
1963	Faulad	4	Gurusharan Singh Kohli	
1963	Parasmani	2	Laxmikant-Pyarelal	
1963	Shikari	4	Gurusharan Singh Kohli	
1963	Sunehri Nagin	4	Kalyanji-Anandji	
1964	Aandhi Aur Toofan	6	Robin Banerjee	
1964	Aaya Toofan	1	Laxmikant-Pyarelal	
1964	Magic Carpet alias Jadui Shatranji	1	Ram Prasad	
1964	Pahadi Nagin	5 (All)	Iqbal	
1965	Johar Mehmood In Goa	1	Kalyanji-Anandji	
1965	Main Hoon Alladin	4	Nashad and Usha Khanna (separately)	
1965	Saat Samandar Paar	6 (All)	Chitragupta Srivastava	
1966	Do Matwale	5 (All)	Gurusharan Singh Kohli	
1966	Thakur Jernail Singh	2	Ganesh Sharma	
1968	Khilari	5 (All)	Lala-Sattar	
1968	Watan Se Door	5 (All)	Lala-Sattar	
1969	Apna Khoon Apna Dushman	4	Lala-Sattar	
1969	Beqasoor	4 (All)	Dattaram Wadkar	
1969	Chaalbaaz	4 (All)	Lala-Sattar	
1969	Jaal Saaz	2	Gurusharan Singh Kohli	
1969	Jahan Pyar Miley	3	Shankar-Jaikishan	
1969	Prince	3	Shankar-Jaikishan	
1970	Choron Ka Chor	4 (All)	Dattaram Wadkar	
1971	Aisa Bhi Hota Hai	1	Omkar Prasad Nayyar	
1971	Ek Din Aadhi Raat	2	Dattaram Wadkar	
1971	Elaan	2	Shankar-Jaikishan	
1971	Saat Sawal alias Hatimtai	At most 3	Lala-Sattar	The film's audio records were issued with the title Saat Saval. However, when the film itself was released, the spelling of the title was modified slightly and an alternative title was added.
1971	Joi Bangla Desh	1	Kalyanji-Anandji	
1973	Taxi Driver	5	Omkar Prasad Nayyar	This film was released in 1973 but its audio records were issued in 1972.
1975	Idd Ka Salaam	2 or 3	Kamal Rajasthani	
1976	Kabeela	5 (All)	Kalyanji-Anandji	
1976	Nehle Pe Dehlaa	1	Aziz Nazan	
1979	Banmanush	3 (All)	Chand Pardesi	
1979	Lahu Ke Do Rang	8 (All)	Bappi Lahiri	It appears that this film was a long time in the making. Its audio records were issued in 1978 but the film was released in late 1979.
1979	Surakksha	1	Bappi Lahiri	
1980	Morchha	2	Bappi Lahiri	
1980	Qurbani	1	Kalyanji-Anandji	
1980	Sahhas	1	Bappi Lahiri	
1982	Disco Dancer	1	Bappi Lahiri	
1982	Dulha Bikta Hai	1	Bappi Lahiri	
1982	Khush Naseeb	2	Kalyanji-Anandji	
1982	Sugandh	3	Bappi Lahiri	
1982	Sumbandh	2	Bappi Lahiri	
1983	Hum Se Na Jeeta Koi	4	Bappi Lahiri	
1983	Laalach	3	Bappi Lahiri	
1983	Love In Goa	2	Bappi Lahiri	
1983	Meri Kahani	At most 6	Ajit Singh	
1983	Taqdeer	1	Kalyanji-Anandji	
1984	Haisiyat	1	Bappi Lahiri	
1984	Pavithra Gangaa	1	Dilshad Kamal and M. Ranga Rao	
1985	Aitbaar	1 or 2	Bappi Lahiri	
1985	Balidaan	5	Bappi Lahiri	
1985	Bewafai	3	Bappi Lahiri	
1985	Bhavani Junction	4	Bappi Lahiri	
1985	Haveli	2	Bappi Lahiri	
1985	Maa Kasam	2	Bappi Lahiri	
1985	Saamri	1	Bappi Lahiri	
1986	Avinash	1	Bappi Lahiri	This film was delayed by a few years when Parveen Babi left it midway. Her scenes had to be wrapped up using body doubles and her dialogues in the film were dubbed by a voice artist.
1986	Bhagwaan Dada	1	Rajesh Roshan	
1986	Chameli Ki Shaadi	3	Kalyanji-Anandji	
1986	Ek Chadar Maili Si	1	Anu Malik	
1986	Janbaaz	2	Kalyanji-Anandji	
1986	Kartoot	1	Usha Khanna	
1987	7 Saal Baad	At least 1	Raj Kamal	
1987	Anjaam	5	Laxmikant-Pyarelal	
1987	Dak Bangla	3	Bappi Lahiri	
1987	Insaaf	5 (All)	Laxmikant-Pyarelal	
1987	Kaash	5 (All)	Rajesh Roshan	
1987	Khudgarz	1	Rajesh Roshan	
1987	Kudrat Ka Kanoon	1	Laxmikant-Pyarelal	
1987	Loha	5 (All)	Laxmikant-Pyarelal	
1987	Mard Ki Zabaan	1	Laxmikant-Pyarelal	
1987	Satyamev Jayate	7 (All)	Bappi Lahiri	
1988	Hamara Khandan	6 (All)	Laxmikant-Pyarelal	Posthomous release
1988	Jungal Ki Beti	At most 3	Rajesh Roshan	Posthomous release
1988	Rukhsat	1	Kalyanji-Anandji	Posthomous release
1988	Woh Milie Thi	3	Bappi Lahiri	Poathomous release. The audio records of this film were released in 1985 with the title Kaun Hai Khooni. However, its release was delayed and it came out in 1988 with a different title Woh Milie Thi.
1988	Zakhmi Aurat	6 (All)	Bappi Lahiri	This film was dedicated to Faruk Kaiser who passed away during its making in 1987.
1989	Abhimanyu	2	Anu Malik	Posthomius release. Work on this film started in 1984 but it was delayed by several years due to changes in its cast.
1989	Daata	3	Kalyanji-Anandji	Posthomous release. film was in the making for a few years.
1989	Izhaar	1	Kalyanji-Anandji	Posthomous release. It appears that while the audio records of this film were issued in 1987, the film itself was released only in 1989.
1989	Mahaadev	4	Ilaiyaraaja	Posthumous release
1989	Naqab	9 (All)	Kamal Makhdoom	Posthumous release
1990	Karishma Kali Kaa	At most 2	Bappi Lahiri	Posthumous release
1990	Zimmedaaar	1	Anu Malik	Posthumous release
1992	Sarphira	4 (All)	Rahul Dev Burman	Posthomous and last release. This film was delayed for many years.

== Notable works ==
Some of Faruk Kaiser's writings include the following songs:

Song title	Movie	Year	Director	Singer	Cast
Purana Tera Khunta Oye Dhakka Laga	Abhimanyu	1989	Tony Juneja	Alka Yagnik	Anil Kapoor, Kimi Katkar, Poonam Dhillon
Sari Sari Raat Teri Yaad Sataye	Aji Bas Shukriya	1958	Mohammed Hussain	Lata Mangeshkar	Suresh, Geeta Bali, Johny Walker, Shammi, Anwar Hussan, Agha, Shobha Khote
Bedardi Nazaren Milaa Ke Kah De Kyaa Hai Teri Marzi	Aji Bas Shukriya	1958	Mohammed Hussain	Lata Mangeshkar	Suresh, Geeta Bali, Johny Walker, Shammi, Anwar Hussan, Agha, Shobha Khote
Sach Kahataa Hai Johnny Walker	Aji Bas Shukriya	1958	Mohammed Hussain	Asha Bhosale	Suresh, Geeta Bali, Johny Walker, Shammi, Anwar Hussan, Agha, Shobha Khote
Tum Aur Main Aur Yeh Bekhudi	Aitbaar	1985	Mukul Anand	Asha Bhosale	Dimple Kapadia, Raj Babbar, Suresh Oberoi
Tumhari Chand Si Surat Pe Hamko Pyar	Apna Khoon Apna Dushman	1969	Kamran Khan	Mohammed Rafi, Asha Bhosle	Dara Singh, Anjum, Mumtaz Begum
Khata Maaf Karna Humari Khudaya	Apna Khoon Apna Dushman	1969	Kamran Khan	Asha Bhosle	Dara Singh, Anjum, Mumtaz Begum
Chhapan Chhuri Hai Mera Naam	Apna Khoon Apna Dushman	1969	Kamran Khan	Asha Bhosle, Usha Timothy	Dara Singh, Anjum, Mumtaz Begum
Zara Nazre Mila	Apna Khoon Apna Dushman	1969	Kamran Khan	Asha Bhosle	Dara Singh, Anjum, Mumtaz Begum
Irada Na Tha Aap Se Pyar Ka	Aandhi Aur Toofan	1964	Mohammed Hussain	Suman Kalyanpur, Mohammed Rafi	Dara Singh, Mumtaz, Jeevan
Ek Taraf Hai Maa Ki Chhaya	Aandhi Aur Toofan	1964	Mohammed Hussain	Mohammed Rafi	Dara Singh, Mumtaz, Jeevan
Chand Gagan Me Ek Hai	Aandhi Aur Toofan	1964	Mohammed Hussain	Mubarak Begum	Dara Singh, Mumtaz, Jeevan
Baaje Pag Pag Payal Mori Kaise Aau	Aandhi Aur Toofan	1964	Mohammed Hussain	Usha Mangeshkar	Dara Singh, Mumtaz, Jeevan
Dil Laya Mai Bacha Ke Punjab Se	Aandhi Aur Toofan	1964	Mohammed Hussain	Mohammed Rafi, Suman Kalyanpur	Dara Singh, Mumtaz, Jeevan
Ye Pyar Hai Aandhi Aur Toofan	Aandhi Aur Toofan	1964	Mohammed Hussain	Kamal Barot, Usha Mangeshkar	Dara Singh, Mumtaz, Jeevan
Rukhsana Rukhsana Dekho Ji	Beqasoor	1969	Kamran Khan	Asha Bhosle, Mohammed Rafi	Sanjana, Meenakshi Shirodkar, Dara Singh
Mohabbat Se Keh Do	Beqasoor	1969	Kamran Khan	Asha Bhosle	Sanjana, Meenakshi Shirodkar, Dara Singh
O Sanam Mera Saath Dena	Beqasoor	1969	Kamran Khan	Suman Kalyanpur, Mohammed Rafi	Sanjana, Meenakshi Shirodkar, Dara Singh
Naam Gulabi Hai Mera	Beqasoor	1969	Kamran Khan	Asha Bhosale	Sanjana, Meenakshi Shirodkar, Dara Singh
Aaya Aaya Pyaar Ka Zamana	Bhagwan Dada	1986	J. Om Prakash	Asha Bhosle, Mohammed Aziz	Sridevi, Rakesh Roshan
Aaj Hi Dil Tu De (Super Fast Love)	Bhagwan Dada	1986	J. Om Prakash	Kishore Kumar, Anuradha Paudwal	Sridevi, Rakesh Roshan
Naach Mere Lala Holi Khele Nandlal	Datta	1989	Sultan Ahmed	Sapna Mukherjee, Nalin Dave	Shammi Kapoor, Suresh Oberoi, Mithun Chakraborty
Auva Auva – Koi Yahaan Aha Naache Naache	Disco Dancer	1982	Babbar Subhash	Usha Uthup (Usha Iyer), Bappi Lahiri	Mithun Chakraborty, Rajesh Khanna, Om Puri
Yahan To Kate Mauj Se Zindagi	Faulad	1963	Mohammed Hussain	Asha Bhosale	Dara Singh, Mumtaz, Minoo Mumtaz, Randhir Kapoor
Dil Hai Humara Phul Se Nazuk	Faulad	1963	Mohammed Hussain	Mohammed Rafi	Dara Singh, Mumtaz, Minoo Mumtaz, Randhir Kapoor
O Matware Saajna	Faulad	1963	Mohammed Hussain	Asha Bhosale	Dara Singh, Mumtaz, Minoo Mumtaz, Randhir Kapoor
Yaad Tori Aayi	Faulad	1963	Mohammed Hussain	Asha Bhosale	Dara Singh, Mumtaz, Minoo Mumtaz, Randhir Kapoor
Mere Malik Mere Maula	Hamaara Khandaan	1988	Anwar Pasha	Ila Arun	Rishi Kapoor, Farha Naaz, Kiran Juneja, Alok Nath, Amrish Puri
Mere Mehboob Ruk Jao, Ab Afsana Baki Hai	Hamaara Khandaan	1988	Anwar Pasha	Anuradha Paudwal, Mohd Aziz	Rishi Kapoor, Farha Naaz, Kiran Juneja, Alok Nath, Amrish Puri
Tum Sochatee Ho Shayad Mai Tumko Chhod Dunga	Hamaara Khandaan	1988	Anwar Pasha	Anuradha Paudwal, Mohd Aziz	Rishi Kapoor, Farha Naaz, Kiran Juneja, Alok Nath, Amrish Puri
Dilbar Jani Gale Laga Le, Ek Mint Ki Baat Hai	Hamaara Khandaan	1988	Anwar Pasha	Alka Yagnik, Shabbir Kumar	Rishi Kapoor, Farha Naaz, Kiran Juneja, Alok Nath, Amrish Puri
Maine Bhi Ek Geet Likha Hai Teri Surat Dekh Kar	Hamaara Khandaan	1988	Anwar Pasha	Shabbir Kumar	Rishi Kapoor, Farha Naaz, Kiran Juneja, Alok Nath, Amrish Puri
Mere Mehboob Kuch Bai Ho Abhi Afsana Baki Hai	Hamaara Khandaan	1988	Anwar Pasha	Anuradha Paudwal, Mohd Aziz	Rishi Kapoor, Farha Naaz, Kiran Juneja, Alok Nath, Amrish Puri
Unki Nazaro Se Koi Nazare Mila Ke Puche	Hanste Rehna	1950		Khan Mastana	Mukri, Habib, Arvind Kumar, Hira
Mai To Chanda Ke Sang Khelu Aankh Michauli	Hanste Rehna	1950		Leela Mehta	Mukri, Habib, Arvind Kumar, Hira
Disco Disco Aa Ha Aa Ha Disco	Hum Se Na Jeeta Koi	1983	Shibu Mishra	Sharon Prabhakar	Shoma Anand, Randhir Kapoor, Birbal, Mohan Choti
Dil Hai Ke Dhadakta	Jahan Pyar Mile	1969	Lekh Tandon	Mohammed Rafi	Shashi Kapoor, Hema Malini, Nadira
Baat Zara Hai Aapas Ki	Jahan Pyar Mile	1969	Lekh Tandon	Sharda	Shashi Kapoor, Hema Malini, Nadira
Nas Nas Mein Agan	Jahan Pyar Mile	1969	Lekh Tandon	Lata Mangeshkar	Shashi Kapoor, Hema Malini, Nadira
Teri Nazar Ne Kiya Kya Ishara	Jaalsaz	1969	Mohammed Hussain	Asha Bhosle, Mohammed Rafi	Dara Singh, Bambi, Agha, Bela Bose
Dil To Hamar Lai Lai	Jaalsaz	1969	Mohammed Hussain	Asha Bhosale	Dara Singh, Bambi, Agha, Bela Bose
Allah Ho Akbar	Jaanbaaz	1986	Feroz Khan	Mahesh Gadhvi & Raju	Anil Kapoor, Feroz Khan, Amrish Puri, Dimple Kapadia, Sridevi, Shakti Kapoor
Jaanbaaz Jaanbaaz Jaan Ki Baazi Lagane Wala Hota Hai	Jaanbaaz	1986	Feroz Khan	Mahesh Gadhavi, Nitu	Anil Kapoor, Feroz Khan, Amrish Puri, Dimple Kapadia, Sridevi, Shakti Kapoor
Baad Muddat Ke Hum Tum Mile	Kaash	1987	Mahesh Bhatt	Kishore Kumar	Mehmood, Jackie Shroff, Dimple Kapadia, Anupam Kher
Kya Hai Tumhaara Naam Alladin Alladin	Kaash	1987	Mahesh Bhatt	Mehmood, Mohammed Aziz, Sonali Vajpayee	Mehmood, Jackie Shroff, Dimple Kapadia, Anupam Kher
Phool Yeh Kahaan Se Aaya Hai Bolu	Kaash	1987	Mahesh Bhatt	Kishore Kumar, Sadhana Sargam	Mehmood, Jackie Shroff, Dimple Kapadia, Anupam Kher
Chhoti Si Hai Baat Koyi Nahin Jane	Kaash	1987	Mahesh Bhatt	Asha Bhosle, Mohammed Aziz	Mehmood, Jackie Shroff, Dimple Kapadia, Anupam Kher
Baad Muddat Ke Hum Tum Mile	Kaash	1987	Mahesh Bhatt	Kishore Kumar	Mehmood, Jackie Shroff, Dimple Kapadia, Anupam Kher
O Yaara Tu Pyaaron Se Hai Pyaara	Kaash	1987	Mahesh Bhatt	Anupama Deshpande, Kishore Kumar	Mehmood, Jackie Shroff, Dimple Kapadia, Anupam Kher
Log Kehte Hain	Khudgarz	1987	Rakesh Roshan	Sadhana Sargam, Mohammed Aziz	Jeetendra, Shatrughan Sinha, Bhanupriya, Govinda
Mukhadaa Chaand Kaa Tukadaa	Kudrat Ka Kanoon	1987	S.A. Chandrashekhar	Alka Yagnik	Hema Malini, Radhika, Jackie Shroff,
Muskurata Hua Gul Khilata Hua	Lahu Ke Do Rang	1979	Mahesh Bhatt	Kishore Kumar	Vinod Khanna, Shabana Azmi, Danny Denzongpa, Helen
Pyar Pyar Pyar, Chaahie Thodaa Pyaar	Lahu Ke Do Rang	1979	Mahesh Bhatt	Kishore Kumar	Vinod Khanna, Shabana Azmi, Danny Denzongpa, Helen
Zid Na Karo Ab To Ruko	Lahu Ke Do Rang	1979	Mahesh Bhatt	Yesudas	Vinod Khanna, Shabana Azmi, Danny Denzongpa, Helen
Mausam Mastaba Hai Dil Deewana Hai	Laalach	1983	Shankar Nag	Kishore Kumar, Lata Mangeshkar	Vinod Mehra, Bindiya Goswami, Pran Ranjeet, Anant Nag
Nazar Bhi Khoyi Khoyi Hai Kadam Bhi Dagmagaye Hai	Madari	1959	Babubhai Mistri	Lata Mangeshkar	Chitra, Anjan
Akeli Mohe Chhod Na Jana O Mera Dil Todh Na Jana	Madari	1959	Babubhai Mistri	Kamal Barot, Lata Mangeshkar	Chitra, Anjan
Dil Lootnewale Jadugar	Madari	1959	Babubhai Mistri	Mukesh, Lata Mangeshkar	Chitra, Anjan
Aaj Babua Bhaye Kotwal	Mahaadev	1989	Raj N. Sippy	Mohammed Aziz, S Janaki	Vinod Khanna, Raj Babbar, Meenakshi Seshadri, Sonu Walia, Shakti Kapoor and Anupam Kher
Dilwale Raat Hai Jawan	Mahaadev	1989	Raj N. Sippy	Asha Bhosle	Vinod Khanna, Raj Babbar, Meenakshi Seshadri, Sonu Walia, Shakti Kapoor and Anupam Kher
Mujhe Baho Me Bhar Ke Dekh Le	Mahaadev	1989	Raj N. Sippy	S P Balasubramaniam, Anuradha Paudwal	Vinod Khanna, Raj Babbar, Meenakshi Seshadri, Sonu Walia, Shakti Kapoor and Anupam Kher
Rim Jhim Rim Jhim	Mahaadev	1989	Raj N. Sippy	Suresh Wadkar, Asha Bhosle	Vinod Khanna, Raj Babbar, Meenakshi Seshadri, Sonu Walia, Shakti Kapoor and Anupam Kher
Fikar Na Kar Pyare	Mahaadev	1989	Raj N. Sippy	Asha Bhosle	Vinod Khanna, Raj Babbar, Meenakshi Seshadri, Sonu Walia, Shakti Kapoor and Anupam Kher
Wo Aaye Hai Dil Ko Karar Aa Gaya	Malika Salomi	1953	Mohammed Hussain	Sulochana Kadam	Kamran, Roopa Verman, Krishna Kumari, Helen
Tadpati Hai Meri Ashko Me	Malika Salomi	1953	Mohammed Hussain	Madhubala Jhaveri	Kamran, Roopa Verman, Krishna Kumari, Helen
Katar Daale Hain Par Sayyaad Ne Varanaa Ye Dikhalaate	Malika Salomi	1953	Mohammed Hussain	Madhubala Jhaveri	Kamran, Roopa Verman, Krishna Kumari, Helen
Aayi Sawan Ruth	Malika Salomi	1953	Mohammed Hussain	Meena Kapoor	Kamran, Roopa Verman, Krishna Kumari, Helen
Khanjar Se Apne Chir Na Sina	Malika Salomi	1953	Mohammed Hussain	Sulochana Kadam, Iqbal	Kamran, Roopa Verman, Krishna Kumari, Helen
Mai Matwali Nagin Hu	Malika Salomi	1953	Mohammed Hussain	Meena Kapoor	Kamran, Roopa Verman, Krishna Kumari, Helen
Aaja Aaja Ke Dil Ko Teri Yaad Aayi	O Tera Kya Kahna	1959	K. Parvez	Lata Mangeshkar	Mehmood, Chitra, Helen, Bhagwan, Kammo, Sheikh Mukhtar, Fazlu, Shyam Kumar, Renu Maker
Oee Maa Oee Maa, Yeh Kya Ho Gaya	Parasmani	1963	Babubhai Mistri	Lata Mangeshkar	Gitanjali, Mahipal, Nalini Chonkar, Maruti Rao, Helen
Chori Chori Jo Tumse Mili	Parasmani	1963	Babubhai Mistri	Lata Mangeshkar, Mukesh	Gitanjali, Mahipal, Nalini Chonkar, Maruti Rao, Helen
Hare Krishna Hare Krishna	Pratik	1987		Asha Bhosale Bappi Lahiri	
Madhosh Hawa Matwali Fiza Sansaar Suhana	Prince	1969	Lekh Tandon	Mohammed Rafi	Vyjayanthimala, Shammi Kapoor, Ajit, Rajendra Nath
Nazar Mein Bijali Ada Mein Shole	Prince	1969	Lekh Tandon	Mohammed Rafi	Vyjayanthimala, Shammi Kapoor, Ajit, Rajendra Nath
Bach Ke Jane Na Dungi Dildar	Prince	1969	Lekh Tandon	Mohammed Rafi, Lata Mangeshkar	Vyjayanthimala, Shammi Kapoor, Ajit, Rajendra Nath
Tujhe Pe Qurbaan Meri Jaan	Qurbani	1980	Feroz Khan	Anwar, Aziz Nazan Sholapuri, Kishore Kumar	Feroz Khan, Vinod Khanna, Zeenat Aman, Amjad Khan
Bhajan Bina Bawre Tune	Roop Lekha	1962	Mohammed Hussain	Mohammed Rafi	Mahipal, Raj Adeeb, Nazir Kashmiri
Sambhal Ke Baitho Zara	Roop Lekha	1962	Mohammed Hussain	Mohammed Rafi, Suman Kalyanpur	Mahipal, Raj Adeeb, Nazir Kashmiri
Tune Churali Meri Mathe Ki Bindiya	Roop Lekha	1962	Mohammed Hussain	Suman Kalyanpur	Mahipal, Raj Adeeb, Nazir Kashmiri
Mehfil Me Tere Husan Ka Deewana Kaun	Roop Lekha	1962	Mohammed Hussain	Mohammed Rafi, Suman Kalyanpur	Mahipal, Raj Adeeb, Nazir Kashmiri
Chhal Baliya Jadu Kar Gayo	Roop Lekha	1962	Mohammed Hussain	Suman Kalyanpur	Mahipal, Raj Adeeb, Nazir Kashmiri
Dilli Gana Ki Mirachi Se Tikha Mora Balma	Roop Lekha	1962	Mohammed Hussain	Suman Kalyanpur	Mahipal, Raj Adeeb, Nazir Kashmiri
Pani Me Aag Lagi	Saamri	1985	Shyam Ramsay, Tulsi Ramsay	S Janaki, Amit Kumar	Rajan Sippy, Arti Gupta, Puneet Issar
Ladki Kaise Phasaayi Jaati Hai, Baat Unko Btayi Jaati Hai	Saamri	1985	Shyam Ramsay, Tulsi Ramsay	Kishore Kumar	Rajan Sippy, Arti Gupta, Puneet Issar
Baalam Ki Chaal Mein Aa Gayi Main	Sakhi Lutera	1955	Mohammed Hussain	Asha Bhosle	Kamran, Shashikala
Aap Jo Chahein Saza Ab Dijiye	Sakhi Lutera	1955	Mohammed Hussain	Khan Mastana	Kamran, Shashikala
Sajan Ke Nainon Se Dil Kyon Na Khele	Sakhi Lutera	1955	Mohammed Hussain	Mubarak Begum	Kamran, Shashikala
Tumse Karte Na Agar Pyar Toh Achcha Hota	Sakhi Lutera	1955	Mohammed Hussain	Asha Bhosle	Kamran, Shashikala
Hum Bhi Tumhare Hain Dil Bhi Tumhara Hai	Sakhi Lutera	1955	Mohammed Hussain	Shamshad Begum	Kamran, Shashikala
Mere Husn Ka Sun Ke Fasana	Sakhi Lutera	1955	Mohammed Hussain	Shamshad Begum	Kamran, Shashikala
De Rahi Hai Duayein	Satyamev Jayate	1987	Raj N. Sippy	Kavita Krishnamurthy	Vinod Khanna, Meenakshi Sheshadri, Madhavi, Anita Raj
Jaanu Meri Jaanu	Satyamev Jayate	1987	Raj N. Sippy	Bappi Lahiri	Vinod Khanna, Meenakshi Sheshadri, Madhavi, Anita Raj
Tu Jaan Se Pyaara Hai	Satyamev Jayate	1987	Raj N. Sippy	Mitalee Mukherjee	Vinod Khanna, Meenakshi Sheshadri, Madhavi, Anita Raj
Jaanam Mere Jaanam	Satyamev Jayate	1987	Raj N. Sippy	Bappi Lahiri	Vinod Khanna, Meenakshi Sheshadri, Madhavi, Anita Raj
Dil Mein Ho Tum, Aankho Mein Tum	Satyamev Jayate	1987	Raj N. Sippy	Kavita Krishnamurthy	Vinod Khanna, Meenakshi Sheshadri, Madhavi, Anita Raj
Disco Badshah	Sahhas	1981	Ravikant Nagaich	Basavalingaiah Hiremath	Mithun Chakraborty, Rati Agnihotri, Madan Puri, Shakti Kapoor
Kaali Kaali Aankhon Wali	Sahhas	1981	Ravikant Nagaich	Asha Bhosle, Bappi Lahiri	Mithun Chakraborty, Rati Agnihotri, Madan Puri, Shakti Kapoor
Meri Jaan Annadi Hai	Secret Agent	1987		Mohammed Rafi	
Maikal Ki Kismat	Secret Agent	1987		Asha Bhosle, Mohammed Rafi	
Hoke Kabhi Kabhi	Secret Agent	1987		Asha Bhosle, Bappi Lahiri	
Mukh Pe Naqaab Dala Hai	Secret Agent	1987		Ashabhosle, Kishore	
Hamne Dekha Yehi	Secret Agent	1987		Asha Bhosle	
Husn Bhi Aap Hai Ishq Bhi Aap Hain	Shapath	1984	Ravikant Nagaich	Anup Ghosal	Raj Babbar, Smita Patil, Ranjeet, Paintal, Shakti Kapoor, Kader Khan
Do Phool Jawani Ke Khila Kyu Nhi Lete	Shapath	1984	Ravikant Nagaich	Asha Bhosale	Raj Babbar, Smita Patil, Ranjeet, Paintal, Shakti Kapoor, Kader Khan
Hoshiyaar	Shapath	1984	Ravikant Nagaich	Chandrani Mukherjee, Alka Yagnik	Raj Babbar, Smita Patil, Ranjeet, Paintal, Shakti Kapoor, Kader Khan
Kish Mish Naam Mera	Shapath	1984	Ravikant Nagaich	Sharon Prabhakar, Bappi Lahiri	Raj Babbar, Smita Patil, Ranjeet, Paintal, Shakti Kapoor, Kader Khan
Pal Pal Masal	Shapath	1984	Ravikant Nagaich	Ursula Vaz	Raj Babbar, Smita Patil, Ranjeet, Paintal, Shakti Kapoor, Kader Khan
Agar Main Poochon Jawab Doge	Shikari	1963	Mohammed Hussain	Lata Mangeshkar, Mohd Rafi	Ajit, Helen, Ragini
Tum ko Piya Dil Diya Kitne Naaz Se	Shikari	1963	Mohammed Hussain	Lata Mangeshkar, Usha Mangeshkar	Ajit, Helen, Ragini
Chaman Ke Phul Bhi Tujhko Gulab Kehte Hain	Shikari	1963	Mohammed Hussain	Lata Mangeshkar, Mohd Rafi	Ajit, Helen, Ragini
Maagi Hain Duaaen Hamane Sanam	Shikari	1963	Mohammed Hussain	Asha Bhosale, Usha Mangeshkar	Ajit, Helen, Ragini
Baaje Ghungroo Chhun Chhun	Shikari	1963	Mohammed Hussain	Lata Mangeshkar	Ajit, Helen, Ragini
Ankho Me Ankhe Daal Ke	Siphasalar	1956	Mohammed Hussain	Asha Bhosle, Mohammed Rafi	Shammi Kapoor, Nadira, Helen
Rahenge Le Ke Raaj Hum	Siphasalar	1956	Mohammed Hussain	Mohammed Rafi	Shammi Kapoor, Nadira, Helen
Aji Oh Ji Tumhen Dekh Jiya	Siphasalar	1956	Mohammed Hussain	Geeta Ghosh Roy Chowdhuri (Geeta Dutt)	Shammi Kapoor, Nadira, Helen
Dil Ne Chheda Hai Tarana	Siphasalar	1956	Mohammed Hussain	Asha Bhosle, Talat Mahmood	Shammi Kapoor, Nadira, Helen
Ek Anar Aur Sau Bimar	Siphasalar	1956	Mohammed Hussain	Asha Bhosle	Shammi Kapoor, Nadira, Helen
Mausam Hai Gaane Ka	Surakksha	1979	Ravikant Nagaich	Annette Pinto, Bappi Lahiri	Mithun Chakravorty, Ranjeeta
Gun Master G9	Surakksha	1979	Ravikant Nagaich	Annette Pinto, Bappi Lahiri	Mithun Chakravorty, Ranjeeta
Teri Nili Nili Jacket Teri Jacket Mein Ek Pocket	Taxi Driver	1963	Mohammed Hussain	Asha Bhosle, Mohammed Rafi	Vishal, Anupama, Ashok Kumar, Nirupa Roy, Asit Sen
Jinhe Ho Pyar Sanam	Taxi Driver	1963	Mohammed Hussain	Asha Bhosale	Vishal, Anupama, Ashok Kumar, Nirupa Roy, Asit Sen
Na Inka Rang Asli Hai Na Inka Roop Asali Hai	Taxi Driver	1963	Mohammed Hussain	Badri, Ambar Kumar	Vishal, Anupama, Ashok Kumar, Nirupa Roy, Asit Sen
Pyaar Karte Ho Yaar Karke Darte Ho Yaar	Taxi Driver	1963	Mohammed Hussain	Krishna Kalle	Vishal, Anupama, Ashok Kumar, Nirupa Roy, Asit Sen
Khakar Tune Paan Kasam Se Le Li Meri Jaan	Taxi Driver	1973	Mohammed Hussain	Asha Bhosle, Mohammed Rafi	Vishal, Anupama, Ashok Kumar, Nirupa Roy, Asit Sen
Shukra Kar Humne Tujhe	Toofani Tirandaz	1959	A R Zamindar	Ismail Azad Qawwal, Sudha Malhotra	Kamran Khan, Shanta Kumari
Allah Ki Wayi	Toofani Tirandaz	1959	A R Zamindar	Shamshad Begum, Khurshid Bawra	Kamran Khan, Shanta Kumari
Jadugar Balma Ne Mera Dil Loot Liya	Toofani Tirandaz	1959	A R Zamindar	Sudha Malhotra	Kamran Khan, Shanta Kumari
Jo Chalayega Hal Wo Hi Payega Phal	Toofani Tirandaz	1959	A R Zamindar		Kamran Khan, Shanta Kumari
Ladkhadate Hai Kadam Meri Kalayi Thamna	Toofani Tirandaz	1959	A R Zamindar		Kamran Khan, Shanta Kumari
Sara Jahan Chhod Ke Tujhe Maine Salaam Kiya	Wardat	1981	Ravikant Nagaich	Mohammed Rafi, Usha Mangeshkar	Mithun Chakraborty, Kajal Kiran, Iftekhar, Jagdeep, Kalpana Iyer, Shakti Kapoor
Na Main Hoon Tera Na Tu Hain Meri	Wardat	1981	Ravikant Nagaich	Usha Uthup, Bappi Lahiri	Mithun Chakraborty, Kajal Kiran, Iftekhar, Jagdeep, Kalpana Iyer, Shakti Kapoor
Aaye Sajanva Nache Ye Manwa	Watan Se Door	1968	Kamran Khan	Suman Kalyanpur	Amarnath, Habib, Daisy Irani, Jerry, Kamran
Mehfil Nahi To Dil Me Sahi	Watan Se Door	1968	Kamran Khan	Mohammed Rafi, Prabodh Chandra Dey	Amarnath, Habib, Daisy Irani, Jerry, Kamran
Kaisa Jadu Dala	Watan Se Door	1968	Kamran Khan	Asha Bhosle, Mohammed Rafi	Amarnath, Habib, Daisy Irani, Jerry, Kamran
Pyare Pyare Tere Andaz Ke	Watan Se Door	1968	Kamran Khan	Asha Bhosle, Mohammed Rafi	Amarnath, Habib, Daisy Irani, Jerry, Kamran
Main To Naachu Main To Gaaun	Watan Se Door	1968	Kamran Khan	Kamal Barot, Asha Bhosle	Amarnath, Habib, Daisy Irani, Jerry, Kamran
Ri Ba Ri Ba				Bappi lahiri- Saregama India Ltd.	
Arre Woh Kisko Dhundhate				Bappi lahiri- Saregama India Ltd.	
Mujhe Mujhe				Laxmikant-Pyarelal- Saregama India Ltd.	
Yeh Bhi Kadam Woh Bhi Kadam				Anu Malik- Super Cassettes Ltd.	
Aakhen Jaam E Sharab				Bappi Lahiri- Carnival Electronics Pvt Ltd	
Suhani Raat Aapko Di Pyar Ke Saath				Bappi Lahiri- Universal Music India Ltd	
Mein Jab Bhi Dekhta Hoon				Bappi Lahiri- Venus Worldwide Entertainment Private Ltd.	
Yaad Rakhana Ye				Bappi Lahiri- Tips Cassettes MFG Co.	
