= Harish Shah =

Indian film director (1943–2020)

- Born: 7 October 1943
- Died: 7 July 2020 (aged 76); Mumbai, Maharashtra, India
- Citizenship: Indian
- Occupations: Film Producer, Director
- Years active: 1968–2020

Harish Shah (7 October 1943 – 7 July 2020) was an Indian Film Producer, Director and Writer, known for his work on Mere Jeevan Saathi featuring Rajesh Khanna and Tanuja, Kaala Sona featuring Feroz Khan and Parveen Babi, Ram Tere Kitne Naam featuring Sanjeev Kumar and Rekha, Zalzala featuring Dharmendra and Shatrughan Sinha, Ab Insaf Hoga featuring Mithun Chakraborty and Jaal: The Trap featuring Sunny Deol and Tabu. He died on 7 July 2020 due to throat cancer.

== Filmography ==
=== Producer, director ===
Year	Title	Producer	Director
1968	Dil Aur Mohabbat	Yes	
1972	Mere Jeevan Saathi	Yes	
1975	Kaala Sona	Yes	
1980	Dhan Daulat		Yes
1981	Hotel	Yes	
1985	Ram Tere Kitne Naam	Yes	
1988	Zalzala		Yes
1995	Ab Insaf Hoga		Yes
2003	Jaal: The Trap	Yes	
