= Keemat (1973 film) =

- Directed by: Ravikant Nagaich
- Written by: Vishwamitter Adil
- Produced by: P. Mallikharjuna Rao
- Starring: Dharmendra; Rekha
- Cinematography: Ravikant Nagaich
- Edited by: N. S. Prakasam
- Music by: Laxmikant-Pyarelal
- Release date: 1973
- Country: India
- Language: Hindi

Keemat (transl. Price) is a 1973 Indian Hindi-language spy thriller film directed by Ravikant Nagaich. It has music by Laxmikant-Pyarelal and lyrics by Anand Bakshi. The film stars Dharmendra, Rekha in lead roles, along with Prem Chopra, Ranjeet, Agha, Satyendra Kapoor and Murad. The character of Gopal Kishan Pandey (Agent 116) was also used for film Farz and Raksha. The film was remade in Telugu as Andadu Aagadu (1979).

== Cast ==
- Dharmendra as Gopal Kishan Pandey / Agent 116
- Rekha as Sudha
- Prem Chopra as Shaktimaan
- Ranjeet as Pedro
- Padma Khanna as Nanda / Maria
- Jayshree T. as Nagina
- Agha as Constable Pandurang
- Satyendra Kapoor as Inspector Deshpande
- Murad as Police Commissioner
- K. N. Singh as Secret Service Chief
- Rajendra Nath as Rajendra Nath Studio Owner

== Soundtrack ==
Song	Singer
"Ae Hero, Chal Aage Badh"	Kishore Kumar
"Maaf Karo Re Baba Maaf Karo, Aisa Bhi Kya Pyar"	Kishore Kumar, Lata Mangeshkar
"Rang Roop Ka Bazaar Hai"	Asha Bhosle
"Main To Pani Piya Tha"	Asha Bhosle
"Dil Rang Loon Kaunse Rang Mein"	Asha Bhosle
"Maine Poochha Meri Shaadi Kab Hogi"	Asha Bhosle
