= Zalzala (1988 film) =

1988 film

- Directed by: Harish Shah
- Written by: Sachin Bhowmick
- Produced by: Vinod Shah
- Starring: Dharmendra; Shatrughan Sinha; Rajiv Kapoor; Anita Raj; Kimi Katkar; Vijayeta Pandit; Danny Denzongpa; Rati Agnihotri
- Music by: R. D. Burman
- Release date: 13 May 1988
- Running time: 170 minutes
- Country: India
- Language: Hindi
- Budget: ₹24 million
- Box office: ₹30 million

Zalzala is a 1988 Indian Hindi-language action adventure film directed by Harish Shah. It features an ensemble cast of Dharmendra, Shatrughan Sinha, Rajiv Kapoor, Anita Raj, Kimi Katkar, Vijayta Pandit, Danny Denzongpa and Rati Agnihotri. It is a loose rehash of 1969 Western, Mackenna's Gold. Zalzala was released on 13 May 1988 and received mainly mixed reviews from critics.

== Plot ==
The narrator starts the movie with a myth that there is a hidden golden temple full of treasures. None can reach there without the map and one old priest only knows the way to the temple. In the other side of the story, Inspector Shiv Kumar arrested ruthless dacoit Sona Singh, who is madly in search of that hidden temple. Sona Sing broke into the jail and killed Shiv's wife Radha. Radha was an orphan and it is revealed later that she was the only sister of Shankar (Man with no name). In another occasion, inspector Shiv met with one vagabond Bholey and Radha's brother Shankar. To take revenge for Radha's death, Shiv Kumar resigned from the police service and chased Sona Singh's gang, but unfortunately was captured by them. Sona Singh told him to guide them to the golden temple, because only Shiv knows the map of that area. The old man informed Shiv about the path to the temple before his death. The full gang of dacoit and Shiv started a hard journey towards the temple. Shankar, Bholey and their respective fiancée also accompanied Shiv.

== Cast ==
- Dharmendra as Inspector Shiv Kumar
- Shatrughan Sinha as Shankar / Benaam
- Rajiv Kapoor as Bhole
- Rati Agnihotri as Radha (Sp. App.)
- Anita Raj as Sheela
- Kimi Katkar as Reshma
- Vijayta Pandit as Paro
- Lalita Pawar as Sheela's Mother
- Danny Denzongpa as Sona Singh
- Gulshan Grover as Heera Singh
- Dan Dhanoa as Moti Singh
- Puneet Issar as Shera
- C. S. Dubey as Mukhiya
- Goga Kapoor as Goon
- Jagdeep as Groom
- Pinchoo Kapoor as Groom's Friend
- Satyendra Kapoor as Police Commissioner
- Sudhir Dalvi as Priest Uday Singh
- Tiku Talsania as Groom's dad

== Music ==
1. "Are Chaaku Chale Tere Liye Bazaaro Me" - Kishore Kumar, Kavita Krishnamurthy
2. "Holi Aayi Re, Aayi Re Aayi Holi Aayi" -Shailendra Singh, Anuradha Paudwal, Sudesh Bhosle
3. "Mar Jayenge Hum" - Hari Om Sharan, Vinod Sehgal, Mohammed Aziz, Hariharan
4. "Dil Hai Kab Kis Pe Sarkar" - Asha Bhosle
