= Surakksha =

- Directed by: Raveekant Nagaich
- Written by: V.D. Puranik (dialogues)
- Screenplay by: Ramesh Pant
- Story by: Rajvansh
- Produced by: B. Subaash; Raveekant Nagaich
- Starring: Mithun Chakravorty; Ranjeeta
- Cinematography: Raveekant Nagaich
- Edited by: Shyam Mukherjee
- Music by: Bappi Lahiri lyrics: Farooq Kaiser; Ramesh Pant
- Distributed by: Kailash Pictures Circuit
- Release date: 22 June 1979 (India)
- Country: India
- Language: Hindi

Surakksha (English: Protection) is a 1979 Hindi-language action spy film directed by Ravikant Nagaich. The film stars Mithun Chakraborty, Ranjeeta, Jeevan, Jagdeep, Iftekhar, and Aruna Irani. Based on a spy thriller (with hero's code of Gunmaster G9), it was the first of two such films with Mithun in the lead, the other being Wardat.

== Plot ==
Shiv Shakti Organization (SSO) intends to spread terror in India. The CBI Chief (Iftekhar) learns about this and calls for Officer Gopi (Mithun), aka Gunmaster G-9, to investigate into the matter. The trouble starts when a plane flown by Captain Kapoor (Suresh Oberoi) is attacked by a stream of deadly signals force landing it. Soon after, agent Jackson (Tej Sapru) is replaced with his look-alike. Gopi doesn't take long to get to this and sets out to rescue his agent. During this, he happens to encounter Priya (Ranjeeta), who's out to investigate her father's death, supposedly by Gopi. After a few chance encounters, both start to check about the organisation and its high command. Further course of investigation leads them to the Hiralal (Jeevan) working with his men using hi-tech gadgets for this organisation. After few interesting stunts, car-chases, fights, dancing with scantily-clad girls, some romance and comedy by agent Khabri (Jagdeep), they happen to meet the patchy-eyed SSO chief, Doctor Shiva (K. Balaji). The rest of the story show on handling this chief and his organization by the CBI.

== History ==
In 2026 director Deepak Mukut stated he held IP rights to Surakksha and character "Gunmaster G-9" and thus would add to the legend by fully making a new Gunmaaster G9 as a major film.

== Cast ==
- Mithun Chakraborty as CBI Officer Gopi/Gunmaster G-9
- Ranjeeta as Priya
- Jeevan as Hiralal
- Jagdeep as Khabari
- Iftakar as CBI Head
- Aruna Irani as Ruby
- Prema Narayan as Maggie
- Tej Sapru as Jackson 'Jackie'
- Balaje as Doctor Shiva, SSO Chief
- Mala Jaggi as Neelam
- Suresh Oberoi as Captain Kapoor (Cameo)

== Crew ==
- Direction – Raveekant Nagaich
- Story – Rajvansh
- Screenplay – Ramesh Pant
- Dialogue – V.D. Puranik
- Production – B. Subaash, Raveekant Nagaich
- Production Company – Gopi Enterprises
- Editing – Shyam Mukherjee
- Cinematography – Raveekant Nagaich
- Music Direction – Bappi Lahiri
- Lyrics – Faruk Kaiser, Ramesh Pant
- Playback – Annette Pinto, Bappi Lahiri, Dilraj Kaur, Kishore Kumar, Lata Mangeshkar, Manna Dey, Usha Mangeshkar

== Soundtrack ==
All music is composed by Bappi Lahiri.

No.	Title	Lyrics	Singer(s)	Length
1.	"Maine Pyar Kiya To Theek Kiya"	Ramesh Pant	Kishore Kumar	4:30
2.	"Yeh Duniya Hain Usi Ki Jo Isse"	Ramesh Pant	Kishore Kumar, Manna Dey, Usha Mangeshkar	6:50
3.	"Mausam Hain Gaane Ka"	Faruk Kaiser	Bappi Lahiri, Annette Pinto	5:20
4.	"Tum Jo Bhi Ho Dil Aaj Do"	Ramesh Pant	Bappi Lahiri, Dilraj Kaur	7:10
5.	"Dil Tha Akela Akela"	Ramesh Pant	Bappi Lahiri, Lata Mangeshkar	5:40
6.	"Gunmaster G9"	Faruk Kaiser	Bappi Lahiri, Annette Pinto	5:47
