= Wardat =

- Film poster
- Directed by: Ravikant Nagaich
- Produced by: Ravikant Nagaich
- Starring: Mithun Chakraborty; Kajal Kiran; Iftekhar; Jagdeep; Kalpana Iyer; Shakti Kapoor
- Music by: Bappi Lahiri
- Release date: 1981
- Running time: 130 minutes
- Country: India
- Language: Hindi

Wardat is a 1981 Hindi-language spy thriller film. The film is the sequel to Surakshaa. According to Bollywood Hungama, the film "bombed".

== Plot ==
Large locusts attack the farmers and farmlands resulting in hefty damages. The Indian Government suspects that this is the work of some terrorists and assign this case to their best agent Gun-master G-9 alias Gopinath, who takes charge and begins the investigation, that will lead him to the dark secret world of underground scientists who are quite capable of harnessing nature to make their ends meet.

== Cast ==
- Mithun Chakraborty as Gunmaster G-9 / Gopinath
- Kaajal Kiran as Kajal Malhotra
- Iftekhar as Chief Shyam Mahanta
- Shakti Kapoor as Shakti Kapoor
- Kalpana Iyer as Anuradha
- Jagdeep as Kabadi
- Keshto Mukherjee as Dharamdas
