= Thirudan =

1969 film by A. C. Tirulokchandar

- Theatrical release poster
- Directed by: A. C. Tirulokchandar
- Written by: A. L. Narayanan (Dialogues)
- Screenplay by: A. C. Tirulokchandar
- Story by: Jagapathy Picture's Story Department
- Produced by: K. Balaji
- Starring: Sivaji Ganesan; K. R. Vijaya; Vijaya Lalitha
- Cinematography: Masthan; M. Viswanath Rai
- Edited by: B. Kanthasamy
- Music by: M. S. Viswanathan
- Production company: Sujatha Cine Arts
- Distributed by: Sivaji Films
- Release date: 10 October 1969
- Country: India
- Language: Tamil

Thirudan (transl. Thief) is a 1969 Indian Tamil-language action film, directed by A. C. Tirulokchandar. The film stars Sivaji Ganesan, K. R. Vijaya, K. Balaji and Vijayalalitha. It is a remake of the Telugu film Adrushtavanthulu (1969), and was released on 10 October 1969. The film became a commercial success, running for over 100 days in theatres.

In the film, a thief chooses retirement into married life. His former boss wants to press him back into service.

== Plot ==
Raju, a thief, turns over a new leaf, marries and lives an honest life. His ex-boss is not too happy about the change and tries everything to get him back.

== Cast ==
- Sivaji Ganesan as Raju
- K. R. Vijaya as Radha
- Vijaya Lalitha as Chithra
- K. Balaji as Jagannath
- Major Sundarrajan as Inspector Ragunath
- S. V. Ramadas as Vasudevan
- Nagesh as Ranga
- Pushpamala as Ranganayaki
- M. S. Sundari Bai as Dhanalakshmi
- C. K. Saraswathi as Paravatham
- Gandhimathi as Guest Role
- Typist Gopu as Guest Role
- Baby Rani as Lakshmi
- Baby Sumathi as Guest Role
- Harikrishnan as Jailer
- Sasikumar as Dancer
- C. I. D. Sakunthala as Dancer

== Production ==
Thirudan, a remake of the Telugu film Adrushtavanthulu (1969), was directed by A. C. Tirulokchandar and produced by K. Balaji's Sujatha Cine Arts. Ganesan's home, Annai Illam, also features in the film.

== Soundtrack ==
The music was composed by M. S. Viswanathan, with lyrics by Kannadasan.

Song	Singers	Length
"Pazhaniyappan Pazhaniyamma"	T. M. Soundararajan	03.42
"Kottai Mathilmele"	T. M. Soundararajan, L. R. Eswari	03.18
"En Aasai Ennodu"	P. Susheela	03.59
"Ninaithapadi Kidaithathadi"	L. R. Eswari	02.57

== Release and reception ==
Thirudan was released in select theatres on 10 October 1969, and in others on 17 October. The Indian Express called it an adaptation of Once a Thief "that the original has been mutilated beyond recognition". The reviewer praised Ganesan and Vijaya's performance and called K. Balaji's villainy "naive" and concluded, "If you care for entertainment with a lot of thrill here is the picture".
