= Himmat (1970 film) =

- Theatrical release poster
- Directed by: Ravikant Nagaich
- Written by: V.D. Puranik; S. M. Abbas (dialogues)
- Based on: Adrushtavanthalu (1968)
- Produced by: P. Mallikharjuna Rao
- Starring: Jeetendra; Mumtaz
- Cinematography: Ravikant Nagaich
- Edited by: N.S. Prakasam
- Music by: Laxmikant Pyarelal
- Production company: Bharathi International Films
- Distributed by: Prasad Productions Pvt. Ltd.
- Release date: 15 April 1970
- Running time: 152 minutes
- Country: India
- Language: Hindi

Himmat (transl. Courage) is a 1970 Hindi-language action film, produced by P. Mallikharjuna Rao under the Bharathi International Films banner and directed by Ravikant Nagaich. It stars Jeetendra, Mumtaz and music composed by Laxmikant Pyarelal. The film is remake of Telugu film Adrushtavanthulu (1968).

== Cast ==
- Jeetendra as Raghu
- Mumtaz as Malti
- Prem Chopra as Boss
- K.N. Singh as Inspector Mathur
- Asit Sen as Dhaniram (The moneylender)
- Jagdeep as Tiger
- Tun Tun as Tiger's mom
- Aruna Irani as Rita
- Brahm Bhardwaj
- Agha as Sethji
- Prabhakar Reddy as Raju
- Naaz as Bansari
- Lakshmi as item dancer
- Praveen Paul as Naaz's Mom
- Master Bobby as Banku

== Soundtrack ==
#	Song	Singer
1	"Himmat Kare Insaan To Kya Ho Nahin Sakta"	Mohammed Rafi
2	"Hai Shukar Ki Tu Hai Ladka"	Mohammed Rafi
3	"Das Gayi Nagin Si"	Mohammed Rafi, Lata Mangeshkar
4	"Aao Piyo Peene"	Mohammed Rafi, Asha Bhosle
5	"Maan Jaiye, Maan Jaiye, Baat Mere Dil Ki Jaan Jaiye"	Mohammed Rafi, Asha Bhosle
6	"Main Hoon Akeli"	Asha Bhosle
7	"Jaal Bichhe Hain Nigahon Ke"	Asha Bhosle
