= Adrushtavanthulu =

- Theatrical release poster
- Directed by: V. Madhusudhana Rao
- Written by: Acharya Aatreya (dialogues)
- Screenplay by: V. Madhusudhana Rao
- Produced by: V. B. Rajendra Prasad
- Starring: Akkineni Nageswara Rao; Jayalalithaa
- Cinematography: S. Venkataratnam
- Edited by: N. S. Prakash
- Music by: K. V. Mahadevan
- Production company: Jagapathi Art Productions
- Release date: 3 January 1969
- Running time: 152 mins
- Country: India
- Language: Telugu

Adrushtavanthulu (transl. Lucky People) is a 1969 Telugu-language action drama film, produced by V. B. Rajendra Prasad under the Jagapathi Art Productions banner and is directed by V. Madhusudhana Rao. It stars Akkineni Nageswara Rao, Jayalalithaa, and music is composed by K. V. Mahadevan. The film was remade in Tamil as Thirudan and in Hindi as Himmat (1970).

== Cast ==
- Akkineni Nageswara Rao as Raghu
- Jayalalithaa as Jaya
- Jaggayya as Boss
- Gummadi as C.I. Inspector Murthy
- Relangi as Guest Role
- Padmanabham as Jackie
- Prabhakar Reddy as Raju
- Tyagaraju as Police Inspector
- Anand Mohan as Razzak
- Geethanjali as Radha
- Suryakantham as Pesaratla Peramma
- Chhaya Devi as Pullatla Pullamma
- Vijaya Lalitha
- Baby Rani as Baby

== Soundtrack ==
Adrushtavanthalu

Film score by K. V. Mahadevan
- Released: 1968
- Genre: Soundtrack
- Length: 24:52
- Producer: K. V. Mahadevan

K. V. Mahadevan chronology
Ekaveera (1969)	Adrushtavanthalu (1968)	Bhale Rangadu (1969)

Music was composed by K. V. Mahadevan. Music was released on Audio Company.

S. No.	Song title	Lyrics	Singers	length
1	"Ayyayyo Brahmayya"	C. Narayana Reddy	Ghantasala	5:24
2	"Kodikoose Jamudaka"	Acharya Aatreya	Ghantasala, P. Susheela	3:59
3	"Muddante Cheda"	Arudra	Ghantasala, P. Susheela	4:26
4	"Nammare Nenu Maranante"	Acharya Aatreya	Ghantasala	2:37
5	"Na Manase Godari"	Aarudra	Ghantasala, P. Susheela	3:42
6	"Mokkajonna Thotalo"	Venkataratnam	P. Susheela	4:44
7	"Chinta Chettu Chiguru Choodu"	Aarudra	Ghantasala, P. Susheela	4:28
8	"Padina Mudra Cherigipoduroi"	Aarudra	P. Susheela	
