= Choron Ka Chor =

- Directed by: Mohammed Hussain
- Produced by: Mohammed Hussain
- Starring: Madan Puri
- Release date: 1970
- Country: India
- Language: Hindi

Choron Ka Chor (Thief of Thieves) is a 1970 Indian drama film directed and produced by Mohammed Hussein. The film stars Madan Puri and Dara Singh.

== Plot ==
Ashok plays a masked bandit often referred to Choran Ka Chor who attempts to mess with an international cartel of smugglers while also looking out for a poverty-stricken family who are about to be thrown out onto the street because they cannot pay the rent for their meager apartment.

== Cast ==
- Dara Singh as Ashok
- Shabnam as Rupa
- Madan Puri as Madanlal
- Jayshree T.
- Agha as Makhan
- Bhagwan as Lakhan
- Shetty as Kalu
- Roopesh Kumar
- Randhir
- Neelam
- Vishwas Kunte
- Dada Curtay

== Soundtrack ==
All songs were composed by N. Datta and written by Farooq Kaiser.

Serial	Song title	Singer(s)
1	"Dil Dhadka"	Usha Mangeshkar and Shyama Hemadi
2	"O Bandhu Suno"	Mahendra Kapoor and Sharda
3	"O Mere Dildaar"	Asha Bhosle and Mohammed Rafi
4	"Tera Mera Pyaar"	Asha Bhosle
