= Rani Aur Lalpari =

- Theatrical release poster
- Directed by: Ravikant Nagaich
- Written by: Pandit Puranik (dialogues); Balakavi Bairagi (lyrics)
- Screenplay by: G.D. Madgulkar
- Story by: G.D. Madgulkar
- Produced by: Hari Prasad Nagaich; Rani Nagaich
- Starring: Rajendra Kumar; Asha Parekh; Baby Raani; Reena Roy
- Cinematography: Ravikant Nagaich
- Edited by: N. S. Prakasham; Venkataratnam
- Music by: Vasant Desai
- Production company: Guru Enterprising Movies
- Release date: August 6, 1975
- Running time: 135 minutes
- Country: India
- Language: Hindi

Rani Aur Lalpari is a 1975 Indian Hindi-language children's fantasy film directed by Ravikant Nagaich and produced by Hari Prasad Nagaich and Rani Nagaich of Guru Enterprising Movies. The film stars Baby Rani in the lead role with Rajendra Kumar, Asha Parekh and Reena Roy in lead roles and Jeetendra, Feroz Khan and Neetu Singh in guest appearances. The music was composed by Vasant Desai. The film was a hit on release.

== Plot ==
Rani is a child who is being brought up by her mother, Kamla as her dad Rajendra has gone out of town on business. Both mother and daughter live with their cruel and selfish relatives. They live with her abusive uncle. One day, Kamla gets the news that her husband is returning, and she is overjoyed. This joy turns to sorrow when she finds out that he has died in an accident. Shortly thereafter, she too passes away, leaving poor Rani at the hands of the cruel relatives. Her best friend Pappu tells her about Lalpari. She succeeds in reaching heaven with the help of Lalpari and manages to trick Yamraj (God of truth and death). However, Rani's father was only injured in the plane crash. Rani lives happily ever after with her parents.

== Cast ==
- Rajendra Kumar as Rajendra, Rani's dad
- Asha Parekh as Kamla, Rani's mom
- Baby Raani as Raani
- Reena Roy as Lalpari
- Master Abbas as Pappu
- Satyen Kappu as Ramlal, Raani's uncle
- Lalita Kumari as Ramlal's wife
- Ramesh Deo as Pappu's father
- Seema Deo as Pappu's mother
- Prem Nath as Yamraj
- Jagdeep as Chitra Gupt
- Aruna Irani as Menaka
- Leena Das
- Jankidas
- Padma Khanna as Mermaid
- Manju Bhargavi as Apsara
- Mahipal
- Narendra Nath as Sardarji
- Danny Denzongpa as himself.

=== Characters in "Ek Baar Ek Ladki Thi" (Cinderella's story) ===
- Neetu Singh as Cinderella
- Jeetendra as Prince Charming
- Rajee Singh as Cinderella's mother
- Preeti Ganguli as Cinderella's step-mom
- Agha as Cinderella's dad

=== Characters in "Ajab Kahani Gulliver Ki" (Gulliver's story) ===
- Feroz Khan as Gulliver
- Raja Babu as King of Lilliput

== Soundtrack ==
#	Title	Singer(s)
1	"Maa O Maa Maa Ke Aansoo"	Asha Bhosle
2	"Mera Phool Badan"	Asha Bhosle
3	"Raani Ki Naa Maani"	Asha Bhosle, Dilraj Kaur
4	"Kirno Se Jagmagaye"	Asha Bhosle, Dilraj Kaur
5	"Ek Baar Ek Ladki Thi"	Asha Bhosle, Dilraj Kaur, Manna Dey
6	"Ammi Ko Chummi Papa"	Dilraj Kaur
7	"Pappa Ko Pappi Lakhon"	Dilraj Kaur
8	"Ajab Kahani Gulliver Ki"	Manna Dey
