= Jadu Tona =

- Directed by: Ravikant Nagaich
- Starring: Feroz Khan and Reena Roy
- Music by: Hemant Bhosle
- Distributed by: Pramod Films
- Release date: 1 January 1977
- Country: India
- Language: Hindi

Jadu Tona is a 1977 Hindi horror film directed by Ravikant Nagaich. The film stars Feroz Khan and Reena Roy. The story is inspired from the film The Exorcist. The movie Raat has also similarities with this movie.

== Cast ==
- Feroz Khan as Dr. Kailash
- Reena Roy as Varsha
- Ashok Kumar as Inspector Jolly Goodman
- Prem Chopra as Amirchand
- Baby Pinky as Harsha
- Prem Nath
- Kanhaiyalal Chaturvedi
- Leela Mishra as Amirchand's Mother
- Ramesh Deo
- K.N. Singh
- Mukri
- V.D. Puranik
- Pandey
- Vijaya Bhanu
- Madhu Apte
- Munni
- Agha
- Aruna Irani
- Jagdeep
- Jeevan Dhar as Pannalal
- Mehmood Jr.
- Polson
- Anusheel Nagaich

== Soundtrack ==
No.	Title	Singer(s)	Length
1.	"Aaine Kuch Toh Batta Unka Tih Hamraaz Hai Tuhi"	K. J. Yesudas
2.	"Har Sannata Kuch Kehta Hai"	Asha Bhosle, K. J. Yesudas
3.	"Yeh Gaon Pyara Pyara, Yeh Lovely Lovely Gaon"	Varsha Bhosle
4.	"Atulit Bal Dhaamam Hey Sevak Shriram Ke"	Dilraj Kaur, Minoo Purushottam, Suman Kalyanpur, Hemant Kumar, Asha Bhosle, Brij Bhushan
5.	"Sawari Saloni Jamna Ka Jeewan""	K. J. Yesudas, Asha Bhosle, Shivangi Kolhapure
