= Ravikant Nagaich =

Indian film director (1931–1991)

- Born: 5 July 1931; Atrauli, Aligarh United Provinces, British India
- Died: 6 January 1991 (aged 59); Madras, Tamil Nadu, India
- Occupations: Director; Cinematographer
- Years active: 1955–1988
- Spouse: Rani

Ravikant Nagaich (5 July 1931 – 6 January 1991) was an Indian cinematographer, director known for his works in Hindi, Telugu and Bengali-language films. He was born at Atrauli, Aligarh- Uttar Pradesh, India. He started his filming career as a cinematographer in Telugu films, N.T. Rama Rao's Sri Seetha Rama Kalyanam (1961) being his first film. With Farz, he turned to Hindi movies and direction. This low-budget thriller inspired by James Bond was a surprise hit and helped boost the careers of Ravikant and the film's lead pair, Jeetendra and Babita. Dharmendra acted as Agent 116 Gopal in Keemat (1973). Jeetendra reprised his role as Agent 116, Gopalkishan Pandey in Raksha (1982) and again in The Gold Medal (1984).

He went on to direct 24 more films with Duty (1986) being his last. Though he had some big-budget hits like Mere Jeevan Saathi and The Train, his low-budget fare such as Surakksha and Wardat – again in the secret agent mode like Farz, Keemat, and Raksha – are his remembered hits due to the tacky stunts and special effects and the fact that despite these drawbacks, the films did well. Mithun Chakravorty too benefitted from Surakksha to move to commercial films as Jeetendra had earlier with Farz.

He also produced two films in the 1980s: Wardaat and Shapath.

== Filmography ==
=== 1960s ===
- Seeta Rama Kalyanam (1961) (cinematographer)
- Gulebakavali Katha (1962) (cinematographer)
- Sri Krishnarjuna Yuddhamu (1963) (cinematographer)
- Sri Krishna Pandaveeyam (1966) (cinematographer)
- Gudachari 116 (1967) (cinematographer)
- Farz (1967) (director and cinematographer)
- Raja Aur Runk (1968) (cinematographer)
- Jigri Dost (1969) (director)
- Mahabaladu (1969) (director and cinematographer)

=== 1970s ===
- The Train (1970) (director and cinematographer)
- Himmat (1970) (director and cinematographer)
- Pyar Ki Kahani (1971) (director and cinematographer)
- Haseenon Ka Devata (1971) (director)
- Mere Jeevan Saathi (1972) (director and cinematographer)
- Keemat (1973) (director and cinematographer)
- Kaala Sona (1975) (director and cinematographer)
- Rani Aur Lalpari (1975) (director)
- Seeta Kalyanam (1976) (cinematographer)
- Daku Aur Mahatma (1977) (director)
- Jadu Tona (1977) (director)
- Thief of Baghdad (1977) (director)
- Surakksha (1979) (director)

=== 1980s ===
- Morchha (1980) (director, cinematographer)
- Rajadhi Raju (1980) (cinematographer)
- Sahhas (1981) (director)
- Wardat (1981) (producer and director)
- Laparwah (1981) (director)
- Raksha (1982) (director)
- Saugandh (1982) (director)
- Shapath (1984) (producer and director)
- Tarkeeb (1984) (director)
- The Gold Medal (1984) (director)
- Duty (director)
- Super Boy 3D (1988) (Kannada) (director)
