= Kaala Sona =

1975 Hindi film

- Movie Poster
- Directed by: Ravikant Nagaich
- Written by: Ramesh Pant
- Produced by: Harish Shah; Vinod Shah
- Starring: Feroz Khan; Parveen Babi; Prem Chopra; Danny Denzongpa
- Cinematography: Ravikant Nagaich
- Edited by: Bimal Roy 2
- Music by: R. D. Burman
- Release date: 19 September 1975
- Running time: 2 hours 17 min
- Country: India
- Language: Hindi

Kaala Sona (transl. Black Gold) is a 1975 Hindi-language dacoit Western film produced by Harish Shah and Vinod Shah and directed by Ravikant Nagaich. The film stars Feroz Khan, Parveen Babi, Prem Chopra, Farida Jalal, Danny Denzongpa, Helen, Durga Khote, Keshto Mukherjee, and Bhagwan. The film's music is by R. D. Burman and the lyrics are by Majrooh Sultanpuri.

== Plot ==
Rakesh's life was turned upside down when his father was murdered. His only consolation was that the assailant was also killed. Years later, Rakesh finds out that his father's killer is still alive, and the police have closed the murder file. He decides to avenge his father's death, travels to a far-off village, and befriends a young man named Shera. He finds out through Durga, whom he falls in love with, that his father's killer is Sardar Poppy Singh, who runs a vast underground business empire of growing and selling cocaine. Then Shera and Durga get the shocks of their lives when they find out that Rakesh has joined forces with Poppy, and has even killed a police officer to prove his loyalty.

== Cast ==
- Feroz Khan as Rakesh
- Parveen Babi as Durga
- Danny Denzongpa as Shera
- Farida Jalal as Bela
- Helen as Chameli
- Prem Chopra as Poppy Singh
- Narendra Nath - Hukam Singh
- Bipin Gupta as Ranjeet Singh
- Durga Khote as Mrs. Ranjeet Singh
- Keshto Mukherjee as Drunkard
- Master Bhagwan as Bartender
- Seema Kapoor as Suzy
- Agha
- Raju Shrestha as Chandan
- K. N. Singh as Police Commissioner
- P. Jairaj as Rakesh's Father
- Satyendra Kapoor as Police Officer
- Krishnakant as Ram Das
- Imtiaz Khan as Bahadur Singh

The film contains the hit song, sung by Danny Denzongpa himself with Asha Bhosle. The lyrics are "Sun Sun Kasam Se".

== Soundtrack ==
The music was written by R. D. Burman and the lyrics by Majrooh Sultanpuri. In a background music of whistling, R. D. Burman used his own tune of "Chala Jaata Hoon" from the 1972 film Mere Jeevan Saathi, which was also directed by Ravikant Nagaich. "Sun Sun Kasam Se" was a popular number and was the 2nd Hindi film song sung by Danny Denzongpa after the song "Mere Paas Aao" in the film Yeh Gulistan Hamara from the year 1972.

| Song | Singer |
|---|---|
| "Tak Jhoom Naacho Nashe Mein Chur" | Kishore Kumar, Asha Bhosle |
| "Sun Sun Kasam Se, Laagun Tere Kadam Se" | Danny Denzongpa, Asha Bhosle |
| "Ek Baar Jaan-E-Jaana" | Asha Bhosle |
| "Koi Aaya, Aane Bhi De" | Asha Bhosle |
