= Prem Chopra =

Indian actor

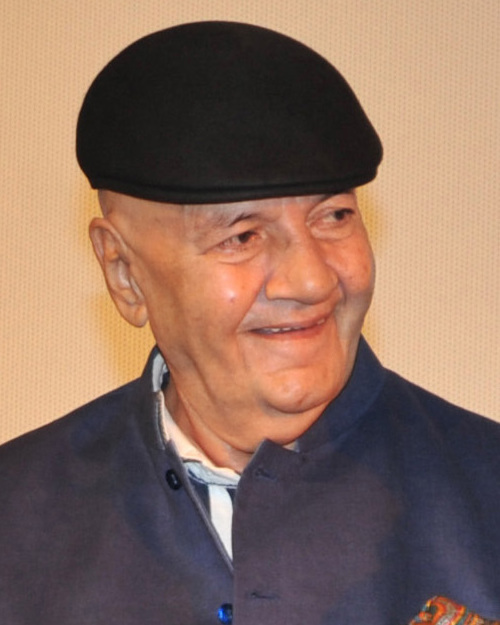
- Prem Chopra in 2013
- Born: 23 September 1935 (age 91); Lahore, Punjab, British India (present-day Punjab, Pakistan)
- Occupation: Actor
- Years active: 1960–present
- Spouse: Uma Malhotra (m. 1969)
- Children: 3
- Relatives: Sharman Joshi (son-in-law); Vikas Bhalla (son-in-law); Prem Nath (brother-in-law); Rajendra Nath (brother-in-law); Narendra Nath (brother-in-law); Raj Kapoor (co-brother-in-law)
- Website: Official website

Prem Chopra (born 23 September 1935) is a Hindi film actor who has appeared in over 380 films in a career spanning more than six decades. He is best known for portraying villainous characters in Hindi cinema between the 1960s through the 1990s. Chopra has also played positive and character roles throughout his career.

Born in Lahore, Punjab Province, British India (now in Pakistan), and raised in Shimla after the Partition of India, Chopra initially worked in journalism and appeared in Punjabi films before transitioning to Hindi cinema. His breakthrough role came with Shaheed (1965), followed by acclaimed performances in films such as Upkar (1967), Bobby (1973), Do Anjaane (1976), and Kranti (1981). His famous dialogue "Prem naam hai mera, Prem Chopra" from Bobby became one of the most memorable lines in Hindi film history.

Over the years, Chopra collaborated with many leading actors, notably Rajesh Khanna, appearing together in more than 20 films. As Hindi cinema evolved, he successfully transitioned from villainous to character and comic roles, continuing to appear in films and television well into the 21st century. He received the Filmfare Lifetime Achievement Award in 2023 for his contributions to Indian cinema.

Outside his acting career, Chopra authored the autobiography Prem Naam Hai Mera, Prem Chopra (2014), written by his daughter Rakita Nanda, and has been active in philanthropic and cultural promotion activities.

== Life and education ==
Chopra, the third of six children of Ranveerlal and Rooprani Chopra, a Punjabi Hindu family, was born on 23 September 1935, in Lahore. After the partition of India, his family moved to Shimla, where he was brought up. He studied in S.D. Senior Secondary School, Shimla. His father desired for him to be a doctor or an Indian Administrative Services Officer.

Chopra completed his schooling and college in Shimla after his father, who was a government servant, got transferred there. He graduated from Panjab University. He took part in college dramatics enthusiastically. At his father's insistence, he completed his graduation and then went to Bombay (present-day Mumbai). Soon after he made his debut film, his mother was diagnosed with mouth cancer and she died, leaving his then nine-year-old sister Anju to be looked after by his father and his four other brothers. The brothers had given a warning to their respective wives that only if their sister is happy, would they be happy and Prem considers his sister to be his first daughter. Noted writer-director Lekh Tandon brought the proposal of Uma for marriage to Prem. Uma was the younger sister of the siblings Krishna Kapoor (wife of Raj Kapoor), Prem Nath and Rajendranath. The couple have three daughters, Rakita, Punita and Prerna Chopra. Rakita is married to film publicity designer Rahul Nanda, the son of author and screenwriter Gulshan Nanda. They have a daughter together by the name Risha Nanda. Punita owns a preschool called Wind Chimes in Bandra, suburban Mumbai, and is married to singer and actor Vikas Bhalla. Prerna is married to Bollywood actor Sharman Joshi, son of Arvind Joshi. Chopra resides in a duplex apartment in Pali Hill, Bandra in Mumbai. He has 6 grandchildren (Sanchi Bhalla, Khyana Joshi, Veer Bhalla, Risha Nanda, Vaaryan Joshi, and Vihaan Joshi).

He became estranged from two of his four brothers in the late 1980s. Chopra had bought a bungalow in 1980 in Delhi, which was jointly owned by him and his father, and his father and one brother used to stay there. Chopra had gotten his brother a job in Delhi and made him stay at the bungalow. But his father, a day before his death, was made to sign a will favouring one of his brothers, taking away Chopra's rights to the bungalow. Later, an income tax raid happened in that same house, and his brother said in the raid that Chopra had given them the bungalow, but the house still was in name of Prem Chopra. Chopra had two other houses in Mumbai as well, which were sold off cheaply by his other brothers without telling him, as they needed the money.

His biography titled Prem Naam Hai Mera, Prem Chopra, written by his daughter Rakita Nanda, was released in April 2014.

== Career ==
=== Beginnings (1960–1967) ===
In Simla, Chopra developed an interest in acting as he had begun to take part in many plays in his college days. Despite stiff opposition from his parents, he managed to go to Bombay to pursue his dream of acting in Bollywood films. In his initial days he stayed at guest houses in Colaba, Mumbai. He started visiting film studios to display his portfolio: The response was not encouraging.

To survive in the fast life of Bombay, he took up a job with The Times of India while trying to gain a foothold in the film industry. He looked after circulation of the paper in Bengal, Orissa and Bihar and was required to tour 20 days a month. Chopra used to cut his touring time by calling the agents to come and meet him at the station so that he could quickly return. This way a tour that would normally take 20 days would get completed in 12, and he would spend the rest of the time going from one studio to the other. While travelling by the suburban train one day, a stranger accosted him and asked if he was interested in joining films. Chopra nodded in agreement and went with that stranger to Ranjit Studios where the producers of Chaudhary Karnail Singh were in search of a hero. Jagjit Sethi, a Punjabi producer, gave him a break as the hero of the established star Jabeen Jalil in Chaudhary Karnail Singh, a Punjabi film. His debut film, it was a Hindu-Muslim romantic love story set against the backdrop of Indo-Pak partition which turned out to be a big hit. The film won National Film Award for Best Feature Film in Punjabi. He was paid Rs 2500 for his debut film.

During his stint with the Times of India, he worked in Punjabi films including Sapani and Hindi films such as Woh Kaun Thi?, Shaheed, Main Shaadi Karne Chala and Teesri Manzil. Prem did not consider acting as a full-time profession in the early 1960s, but he kept trying to get roles in films due to his passion for acting. Among his early films, he played Sukhdev in Shaheed, one of his rare positive leading roles. Prem had done four movies before Woh Kaun Thi?, a box office hit of 1964, had been released. On the sets of Woh Kaun Thi? which had Manoj Kumar as lead hero, Prem met Manoj for the first time. Manoj offered Prem a positive role in Shaheed, for which Manoj was the presenter. During the shooting of Main Shadi Karne Chala someone suggested that he become a villain. He continued working with The Times of India when he was already a part of box office hits like Nishan, Sikandar E Azam in 1965 and Sagaai, Mera Saaya in 1966. After Teesri Manzil and Upkaar, he was flooded with offers to play the villain in films. After Upkaar in 1967, he left The Times of India to focus solely on acting.

=== Established actor (1969–1995) ===
Since 1967, he has been a leading villain in Hindi films and his peak period as main villain was from 1967 to 1995. In the 1970s he got plum roles as villains often with Sujit Kumar and Ranjeet. In a few films he played secondary villain to villainous characters of Ajit, Madan Puri, Pran, Prem Nath, Jeevan in the 1970s and 1980s and to Amrish Puri and Amjad Khan in the late 1980s.

He played the main lead in the 1970 box office hit small-budget comedy film Samaj Ko Badal Dalo as a lead hero, and was paired opposite Telugu film actresses Kanchana and Sharada. The song "Tum Apni Saheli Ko Itna Bata Do Ki Usse Koi Pyar Karne Laga Hai", sung by Rafi and picturised on Prem Chopra, from the film and the song "Rah Mein Kaliya", a song sung by Kishore Kumar and performed on-screen by Prem Chopra in the film Nafrat (1973), continue to be popular. In the critically acclaimed comedy film Hulchul (1971), a remake of Anubavam Pudhumai, he played the lead hero in this suspense thriller. The dialogue "Prem naam hai mera, Prem Chopra" (My name is Prem, Prem Chopra) from the film Bobby became very popular. From the film Souten, the dialogues "Main wo bala hoon jo sheeshe se pathar ko todta hu" (I am that trouble which crushes stones with glass) and "Jinke Ghar Sheeshe Ke Hote Hain Woh Batti Bhujakar Kapde Badalte Hai", became popular.

He was the regular in villainous roles in the films with Rajesh Khanna in the lead role from 1969 to 1991 from Doli till Ghar Parivar. The duo of Prem and Rajesh Khanna acted in 19 films together and 15 of them were box-office hits, and they were very close friends in real life till Khanna's death. Prem quoted in an interview "Rajesh Khanna and I were considered a lucky pair and distributors used to tell Rajesh Khanna that we don't care who your heroine is, all we want to know is whether Prem Chopra is in the film." He also mouthed dialogues in the song "Aaj Pila Dey Saathi Apni" sung by Mahendra Kapoor from the film Doli (1969). He also mouthed dialogues in the song "Lo Mera Pyar Lelo" from Nafrat in 1973 with Asha Bhosle and "Kab Se Ye Dil Hai Pyaasa" from Mera Muqaddar in 1988.

He played son to the villainous character of actor Ajit in films like Azaad, Chhupa Rustom, Jugnu and co-starred with him in Des Pardes, Ram Balram and Barood. In the late 80s, he played second fiddle to Amrish Puri only in a few films such as Awaaz, Shahenshah and Aaj Ka Arjun. Amrish Puri had played Prem Chopra's henchman in Dostana, Immaan Dharam and a minuscule role in Naseeb. Otherwise in the majority of the films from 1969 to 1991 – Prem Chopra was the main villain. In fact, in Rajesh Khanna's films from 1969 to 1991, Prem Chopra was always the main villain and was never given a henchman's role except in Awaaz. He was main villain in all films starring Manoj Kumar from Upkar (1967) to Santosh (1989).

He was paired opposite actress Bindu regularly in films such as Lagan (1971), Kati Patang, Do Raaste, Daag, Chhupa Rustam, Phandebaaz, Tyaag, Nafrat, Gehri Chaal and Daastan.

Unlike other villains, Chopra's on-screen evil didn't rely on gizmos, his characters didn't rely on henchmen to do the dirty work and he never needed wicked names. Some of his famous dialogues from the 1990s include – "Sharafat aur imaandaari ka certificate ye duniya sirf unhe deti hai jinke paas daulat hoti hai" from Aag Ka Gola (1990), "Bhains poonch uthayegi to gaana to nahi gayegi, gobar hi degi" from Aaj Ka Arjun (1990), "Tu Madhuri se thodi kum aur Mandakini se thodi zyada hai" from Aaj Ka Goonda Raj (1992), "Rajneeti ki bhains ke liye daulat ki lathi ki zaroorat hoti hai" from Khiladi (1992), "Kar bhala to ho bhala" from Raja Babu (1994) and "Nanga nahayega kya aur nichodega kya" from Dulhe Raja (1998).

=== Later career (1996–present) ===
After 1996, he appeared as a villain in very few films. He took up positive character roles in 1996 and started getting more positive roles in 2007. His screen space was reduced in the films after 2007.

==== Legacy ====
Prem Chopra considers that his best roles were in Shaheed (1965), Upkaar (1967), Purab Aur Pashchim, Do Raaste (1969), Kati Patang (1970), Do Anjaane (1976), Jaadu Tona (1977), Kala Sona, Dostana (1980), Kranti (1981), Jaanwar (1982), Oonche Log (1985), Indira (1989), Phool Bane Angaarey (1991), Bewaffa Se Waffa and the 19 films with Rajesh Khanna. He considers that his best performances in positive roles came in Sikander-e-Azam, Kunwari, Shaheed, Jaadu Tona and Chori Chori Chupke Chupke. He disclosed in an interview that "My films with Rajesh Khanna are very special to me. Right from Doli then Do Raaste, Kati Patang, Daag, Ajnabee, Prem Nagar, Maha Chor, Mehbooba, Tyaag, Bebus, Aanchal, Jaanwar, Souten, Maqsad, Awaaz, Shatru, Oonche Log, Waapsi and Ghar Parivaar. 15 of 17 released were hits. Each of those films showed different shades of my personality in villainous role." When asked how he could continue so long in a cinematic career, he said, "Although I came to be a hero, my films as a leading man flopped, which was good in a way, because a whole new world opened in front of me. There were so many more roles I could do. When I established myself as a villain it could continue for years."

== Filmography ==
=== 1960s ===
- Dr Vidya (1962)
- Chaudhary Karnail Singh (1960) as Shera (Punjabi movie)
- Hum Hindustani (1960)
- Main Shadi Karne Chala (1962)
- Aeh Dharti Punjab Di (1963) (Punjabi Movie)
- Sapni (1963) Punjabi movie
- Woh Kaun Thi? (1964) as Ramesh
- Shaheed (1965)
- Sikandar E Azam (1965)
- Nishan (1965)
- Poonam Ki Raat (1965) as Peter
- Mera Saaya (1966) as Daku Suryavar Singh / Ranjit
- Kunwari (1966)
- Sagaai (1966) as Kailash
- Teesri Manzil (1966) as Ramesh
- Latt Saheb (1967)
- Aamne – Saamne (1967)
- Upkar (1967) as Puran 'Kumar'
- Duniya (1968) as Mohanchand
- Jhuk Gaya Aasman (1968) as Prem Kumar Saxena
- Haye Mera Dil (1968)
- Do Raaste (1969) as Birju Gupta
- Ek Shriman Ek Shrimati (1969) as Ajit Choudhury
- Pardesan as Raj (Punjabi Movie)
- Anjaana (1969) as Ramesh
- Waris (1969) as Ravi/ Ram Kumar#2
- Doli (1969) as Prem

=== 1970s ===
- Prem Pujari (1970) as Bilkish Mohammad (Billy)
- Samaj Ko Badal Dalo (1970) as Shyam
- Pagla Kahin Ka (1970) as Shyam
- Purab Aur Paschim (1970) as O.P Omkar
- Himmat (1970) as Boss
- Jawab (1970) as Sagar (Zamindar's Son)
- Yaadgaar (1970)
- Kati Patang (1970) as Kailash
- Haré Raama Haré Krishna (1971) as Dronacharya
- Pyar Ki Kahani (1971) as Banke
- Lagan (1971)
- Hulchul (1971) as Mahesh Jetley # 1
- Aap Aye Bahaar Ayee (1971) as Kumar
- Dastaan (1972) as Rajan
- Raja Jani (1972) as Pratap Bahadur Singh
- Gora Aur Kala (1972) as Shamsher Singh
- Apradh (1972) as Harnam Khanna
- Be-Imaan (1972) as Deepak Das
- Raaste Kaa Patthar (1972) as Ranjeet Choudhry
- Bobby (1973) as Prem Chopra
- Jugnu (1973) as Ramesh
- Jheel Ke Us Paar (1973) as Pratap
- Gehri Chaal (1973) as Madan
- Chhupa Rustam (1973) as Bahadur Singh
- Nafrat (1973)
- Keemat (1973) as Shaktiman
- Daag: A Poem of Love (1973) as Dheeraj Kapoor
- Benaam (1974) as Kishanlal
- Ajanabee (1974) as Motibabu
- Jab Andhera Hota Hai (1974)
- Prem Nagar (1974) as Shamsher Singh
- Vachan (1974)
- Pocket Maar (1974) as Madan Malhotra
- Kaala Sona (1975) as Poppy Singh
- Do Jhoot (1975) as Shailesh
- Do Jasoos (1975) as Prem Chopra
- Raaja (1975)
- Sanyasi (1975) as Banwari
- Mehbooba (1976) as Appa
- Lagaaam (1976)
- Bairaag (1976) as Kunwar Pratap Singh
- Barood (1976)
- Maha Chor (1976)
- Do Anjaane (1976)
- Tyaag (1977)
- Immaan Dharam (1977)
- Kasum Khoon Ki (1977)
- Jagriti (1977)
- Adha Din Adhi Raat (1977)
- Adha (1977)
- Darling Darling (1977)
- Thief of Baghdad (1977)
- Jadu Tona (1977)
- Dream Girl (1977)
- Dildaar (1977)
- Paapi (1977)
- Dil Aur Deewar (1978)
- Phandebaaz (1978)
- Des Pardes (1978)
- Azaad (1978)
- Do Musafir (1978)
- Trishul (1978)
- Kaala Patthar (1979)
- Jhoota Kahin Ka (1979)
- The Great Gambler (1979)
- Bebus (1979)

=== 1980s ===
- Dostana (1980)
- Aanchal (1980)
- Alibaba Aur 40 Chor (1980)
- Lootmaar (1980)
- Saboot (1980)
- Dhan Daulat (1980)
- Nishana (1980)
- Ram Balram (1980)
- Ek Aur Ek Gyarah (1981)
- Shakka (1981)
- Naseeb (1981)
- Kranti (1981)
- Aas Paas (1981)
- Sansani: The Sensation (1981)
- Sawaal (1982)
- Desh Premee (1982)
- Gopichand Jasoos (1982)
- Haathkadi (1982)
- Do Dishayen (1982)
- Khud-Daar (1982)
- Raksha (1982)
- Farz Aur Kanoon (1982)
- Mawaali (1983)
- Bandhan Kuchchey Dhaagon Ka (1983)
- Betaab (1983)
- Souten (1983)
- Prem Tapasya (1983)
- Jaanwar (1983)
- Daulat Ke Dushman (1983)
- Pukar (1983)
- Andha Kanoon (1983)
- Awaaz (1984)
- Manzil Manzil (1984)
- Duniya (1984)
- Ram Tera Desh (1984)
- Maqsad (1984)
- Ghar Ek Mandir (1984)
- Teri Bahon Mein (1984)
- Bhavani Junction (1985)
- Oonche Log (1985)
- Mard (1985)
- Telephone (1985)
- Sitamgar (1985)
- Arjun (1985)
- Sarfarosh (1985)
- Ram Tere Kitne Nam (1985)
- Bond 303 (1985)
- Kali Basti (1985)
- 3D Saamri (1985)
- Haqeeqat (1985)
- Aaj Ka Daur (1985)
- Avinash (1986)
- Preeti (1986)
- Ilzaam (1986)
- Swarag Se Sunder (1986)
- Waapsi (1986)
- Shatru (1986)
- Saveray Wali Gaadi (1986)
- Nagina (1986)
- Insaf Ki Pukar (1987)
- Hiraasat (1987)
- Hawalaat (1987)
- Majaal (1987)
- Kalyug Aur Ramayan (1987)
- Hukumat (1987)
- Mard Ki Zabaan (1987)
- Watan Ke Rakhwale (1987)
- Mahaveera (1988)
- Charnon Ki Saugandh (1988)
- Shukriyaa (1988)
- Shahenshah (1988)
- Mera Muqaddar (1988)
- Mera Shikar (1988)
- Gunahon Ka Faisla (1988)
- Sagar Sangam (1988)
- Sikka (1989)
- Daata (1989)
- Dana Paani (1989)
- Jung Baaz (1989)
- Abhimanyu (1989)
- Garibon Ka Daata (1989)
- Rakhwala (1989)
- Clerk (1989)
- Santosh (1989)
- Sachché Ká Bol-Bálá (1989)
- Joshilaay (1989)
- Indira (1989)
- Dav Pech (1989)
- Aakhri Badla (1989)
- Paanch Paapi (1989) as Chaudhary Raghuveer Singh
- Kanoon Ki Awaaz (1989)
- Kanoon Ka Harz (1989)
- Mitti Aur Sona (1989)
- Gharana (1989)

=== 1990s ===
- Majboor (1990)
- Doodh Ka Karz / Upkar Dudhache (1990)
- Paap Ki Kamaee (1990)
- Police Public (1990)
- Atishbaz (1990)
- Azaad Desh Ke Gulam (1990)
- Aag Ka Gola (1990)
- Kali Ganga (1990)
- Insaaf Ka Khoon (1991)
- Ghar Parivaar (1991)
- Princess from Kathmandu (1991)
- Phool Bane Angaarey (1991)
- Mast Kalandar (1991)
- Veerta (1991)
- Ghar Jamai (1992) as Sadhuram
- Aaj Ka Goonda Raj (1992)
- Tahalka (1992)
- Khiladi (1992)
- Tyagi (1992)
- Bewaffa Se Waffa (1992)
- Virodhi (1992)
- Prem Deewane (1992)
- Mere Sajana Saath Nibhana (1992)
- Khel (1992)
- Santaan (1993)
- 15th August (1993) as Home Minister Bhurelal Nagpal
- Aaja Meri Jaan (1993)
- Izzat Ki Roti (1993)
- Phool Aur Angaar (1993)
- Kshatriya (film) (1993)
- Jaagruti (1993)
- Aasoo Bane Angaarey (1993)
- Aao Pyaar Karen (1994)
- Yaar Gaddar (1994)
- Brahma (1994)
- Prem Yog (1994)
- Betaaj Badshah (1994)
- The Law (1994)
- Laadla (1994)
- Insaniyat (1994)
- Raja Babu (1994)
- Gopalaa (1994)
- Cheetah (1994)
- Diya Aur Toofan (1995)
- Zamaana Deewana (1995)
- Saajan Ki Baahon Mein (1995)
- The Don (1995)
- God and Gun (1995)
- Aazmayish (1995)
- Jawab (1995)
- Andaz (1995 TV Series)
- Aashique Mastane (1995)
- Raghuveer (1995) as Sevak Ram
- Jallaad (1995)
- Ahankaar (1995)
- Ab Insaf Hoga (1995)
- Sapoot (1996)
- Hum Hain Premi (1996)
- Daanveer (1996)
- Sikander (1996 Video)
- Prem Granth (1996)
- Namak (1996)
- Return of Jewel Thief (1996)
- Mera Hindustan (1996)
- Udaan (1997)
- Jodidar (1997)
- Bhai Bhai (1997)
- Kaun Rokega Mujhe (1997)
- Gupt: The Hidden Truth (1997)
- Zulm-O-Sitam (1998)
- Maharaja (1998)
- Iski Topi Uske Sarr (1998)
- Hatya Kaand (1998)
- Dulhe Raja (1998)
- Military Raaj (1998)
- Dhoondte Reh Jaaoge! (1998)
- Hindustan Ki Kasam (1999)
- Hote Hote Pyar Hogaya (1999)
- Jai Hind (1999)
- Anari No.1 (1999)
- Lal Baadshah (1999)
- Lo Main Aa Gaya (1999)
- Baadshah (1999)

=== 2000s ===
- Beti No. 1 (2000)
- Agniputra (2000)
- Meri Adalat (2001) as Dr. David
- Tera Mera Saath Rahen (2001)
- C.I.D. (TV series) (2001)
- Chori Chori Chupke Chupke (2001)
- Pyar Ki Dhun (2002)
- Dil Pardesi Ho Gayaa (2003)
- Koi... Mil Gaya (2003)
- Dhund: The Fog (2003)
- Hum Kaun Hai ? (2004)
- Mysteries Shaque (2004)
- Shikaar (2004)
- Woh Tera Naam Tha (2004)
- Mr Prime Minister (2005)
- Vaah! Life Ho Toh Aisi! (2005)
- Maine Gandhi Ko Nahin Mara (2005)
- Viruddh... Family Comes First (2005)
- Ssukh (2005)
- Bunty Aur Babli (2005)
- Khullam Khulla Pyaar Karen (2005)
- Saawan... The Love Season (2006)
- Umar (2006)
- Bold (2006)
- Dhamaal (2007)
- Buddha Mar Gaya (2007)
- Undertrial (2007)
- Broken Thread (2007)
- Salaam-e-Ishq: A Tribute to Love (2007) as Colonel Bakshi
- Money Hai Toh Honey Hai (2008)
- Khushboo (2008)
- Humsey Hai Jahaan (2008)
- World Cupp 2011 (2009)
- Rocket Singh: Salesman of the Year (2009)
- Daddy Cool (2009)
- Delhi-6 (2009)

=== 2010s ===
- Golmaal 3 (2010)
- Mirch (2010)
- Loot (2011)
- Love U...Mr. Kalakaar! (2011)
- Dharti (Punjabi) (2011)
- Patiala House (2011)
- Jaane Bhi Do Yaaron (2011)
- Power Cut (Punjabi) (2012)
- Challo Driver (2012)
- Delhi Safari (Voice) (2012)
- Agent Vinod (2012)
- 18.11: A Code of Secrecy (2014)
- Disco Singh (Punjabi) (2014)
- Honour Killing (2014)
- I Love NY (2015)
- Chidiya Ghar (TV series) (2016)
- Patel Ki Punjabi Shaadi (2017)
- Jeena Isi Ka Naam Hai (2017)
- Udanchhoo (2018)
- Rangeela Raja (2019)
- Line of Descent (2019)

=== 2020s ===
- Bunty Aur Babli 2 (2021)
- Animal (2023)
- Showtime (TV series) (2024)

== Awards ==
- 1971 – Nominated - Filmfare Award for Best Supporting Actor for Himmat
- 1976 – Filmfare Award for Best Supporting Actor for Do Anjaane
- 1976 – Nominated - Filmfare Award for Best Supporting Actor for Mehbooba
- 2004 – Legend of Indian Cinema Award at Atlantic City
- Among other awards won, the Giants honoured him with the "Lifetime Achievement Award".
- He has been honoured with a Lions Club Award, Ashoka Award, Ashirwad Award and the "Punjabi Kala Sangam Award."
- 2023: Lifetime Achievement Award at 68th Filmfare Awards.

== Bibliography ==
- Chopra, Prem; Nanda, Rakita (2014). Prem Naam Hai Mera, Prem Chopra. Rupa Publications. ISBN 9788129131188.
