= Narendra Nath =

Indian actor

- Born: 1935; Jabalpur, Central Provinces and Berar, British India
- Died: 1998 (aged 62–63); Jabalpur, Madhya Pradesh, India
- Occupation: Actor
- Years active: 1966–1998
- Relatives: Rajendra Nath (Brother); Prem Nath (Brother); Krishna Kapoor (Sister); Uma Chopra (Sister); Raj Kapoor (Brother-in-law); Prem Chopra (Brother-in-law)

Narendra Nath (1935–1998) was an Indian actor.

== Early life and background ==
His full name is Narendra Nath Malhotra. He was the first cousin to actor Prithviraj Kapoor. Prithviraj's mother was the elder sister of Narendra's father. Two of his brothers were also actors, being the late Prem Nath and Rajendra Nath. Prem Nath was married to the actress Bina Rai. Narendra also had two sisters. His elder sister, Krishna, was the wife of the legendary Raj Kapoor and the matriarch of a large family of film personalities. His other sister, Uma, is the wife of actor Prem Chopra.

== Filmography ==
- Khofnak Mahal (1998)
- Aakhri Sanghursh (1997) - Shekhar
- Hind Ki Beti (1996)
- Pyar Do Pyar Lo (1995)
- Mere Data Garib Nawaz (1994)
- Zee Horror Show (1993) - Dastak Episode as Ramdin (servant)
- Veerta (1993)
- Ajooba (1991) - Sharafat Khan Bandit
- Kohraam (1991) - Sarju Yadav
- Farishtay (1991) - (Guest Appearance)
- Deewana Mujh Sa Nahin (1990) - Anita's uncle
- Zimmedaaar (1990) Viju's partner
- Desh Ke Dushman (1989) - Jagga
- Purani Haveli (1989) - Nareen
- Sau Saal Baad (1989) - Thakur Veerendra Pratap Singh
- Jeete Hain Shaan Se (1988)
- Veerana (1988) - Psychiatrist
- Diljalaa (1987) - Mehra
- Dak Bangla (1987) - Thakur Maan Singh
- Maa Baap (1987)
- Jwala (1986) - Saudamal
- Tahkhana (1986) - Dhurjan Singh
- Adventures of Tarzan (1985) -Krishnakant Verma
- Haveli (1985) - Escaped convict
- Surkhiyaan (The Headlines) (1985) - Jaggu
- Sitamgar (1985) Kundan
- Ramkali (1985) - Rasulla
- Ram Tere Kitne Nam (1985) - Naren
- Lava (1985) - Nath
- Ganga Ke Paar (1985)
- Jawaani (1984) - Vishnu Dada
- Maan Maryada (1984) - Bhura Singh
- Rakta Bandhan (1984) - Ranga
- Chor Police (1983) - Prakash
- Haadsa (1983) Police Inspector
- Pukar (1983)
- Qayamat (1983) - Lobo
- Kaun? Kaisey? (1983)
- Jeeo Aur Jeene Do (1982)
- Insaan (1982) -
- Meharbaani (1982)
- Ashanti (1982) - Sampat
- Adhura Aadmi (1982)
- Kachche Heere (1982) - Jaggu
- Prohari (1982) -
- Professor Pyarelal (1981) - Sammy's associate
- Raksha (1982)- Jagat Baba
- Aapas Ki Baat (1981) - Bosco
- Hotel (1981) - Girdharilal
- Dahshat (1981)- Inspector Verma
- Jwala Daku (1981)- Mangal
- Parakh (1981)
- Bambai Ka Maharaja (1980)
- Guest House (1980 film) (1980)- John
- Qurbani (1980)- Traffic Cop
- Lootmaar (1980)
- Saboot (1980) Ashok Gupta
- Bebus (1979)
- Chambal Ki Rani (1979)
- Heera-Moti (1979)
- Chambal Ki Rani (1979) Dracula
- Janta Hawaldar (1979)
- Chor Sipahee (1979) Inspector Apte
- Mahi Munda (1979)
- Habari (1979)
- Daku Aur Mahatma (1977)
- Hira Aur Patthar (1977) Pratap Singh
- Khel Khilari Ka (1977) Sangram Singh's Son
- "Maa baap" (Gujarati) (1977)
- Deewaangee (1976) Munne Khan
- Koi Jeeta Koi Haara (1976)
- Rani Aur Lalpari (1975)
- Vardaan (1975)
- Rafoo Chakkar (1975) Himself
- Dharam Karam (1975) Ranjit A. Kumar
- Kala Sona (1975) Hukam Singh
- Vandana (1975) Badal
- Khhotte Sikkay (1974) Jaggu dada
- Love in Bombay (1974)
- Woh Main Nahin (1974) Vishwambhar
- Mr. Romeo (1974) Prem Pal
- Aaj Ki Taaza Khabar (1973) Capt. Ranjeet Goel
- Anamika (1973) Ganga Prasad Malhotra
- Hifazat (1973)
- Kora Anchal (1973)
- Gharibi Hatao (1973)
- Rani Aur Jaani (1973) Bhavani Singh
- Jangal Mein Mangal (1972) Baldev
- Jawani Diwani (1972) Benny
- Ganga Tera Pani Amrit (1971)
- Sharmeelee (1971) Tiger
- Kal Aaj Aur Kal (1971) Hamid
- Sawan Bhadon (1970)
- Jahan Pyar Mile (1969)
- Amrapali (1966) Lord Buddha

as Assistant Director

- Prince (1969)
- Jhuk Gaya Aasman (1968)
- Amrapali (1966)
