= Sahhas =

- Directed by: Ravikant Nagaich
- Written by: S. M. Abbas
- Starring: Mithun Chakraborty; Rati Agnihotri; Shakti Kapoor; Sharat Saxena; Jagdeep
- Music by: Bappi Lahiri
- Release date: 18 September 1981 (India)
- Running time: 135 minutes
- Country: India
- Language: Hindi

Sahhas is a 1981 Indian bilingual action film simultaneously shot in Bengali and Hindi languages, directed by Ravikant Nagaich. starring Mithun Chakraborty, Rati Agnihotri, Shakti Kapoor, Sharat Saxena and Jagdeep.

== Plot ==
Kishinchand is a Customs Officer based in Bombay.

== Cast ==
- Mithun Chakraborty as Krishna Kumar / Kishanchand
- Rati Agnihotri as Radha
- Madan Puri as Jagan
- Shakti Kapoor as Billa
- Sharat Saxena as Ajay Kumar
- Jagdeep as Karvat
- Goga Kapoor as Major Veer Singh
- Bhagawan Dada as Havaldar
- Anand Balraj as Suresh Kumar
- Kiran Kumar
- Prem Bedi
- Randhir
- Moolchand as Goon
- Raj Kumar
- Jaggar Rao
- Jai Mohan
- Purnima as Meena A Kumar
- Kalpana Iyer
- Prema Narayan as Champa Bai
- Leena Dass as Gina
- Sanjeevini As Rajni Kumar
- Manorama as Gulabi
- Satyen Kappu as Vijay Kumar (Cameo)

== Soundtrack ==
All songs are composed by Bappi Lahiri.

#	Song	Singer
1	"Saare Zamaane Mein"	Asha Bhosle
2	"Kaali Kaali Aankhonwali"	Asha Bhosle, Bappi Lahiri
3	"Aao Badshah, Aao Badshah"	Bappi Lahiri
4	"Ganpati Baapa Moriya"	Bappi Lahiri, Anwar
5	"Ghaat Ghaat Ka Paani"	Usha Mangeshkar
6	"Disco Music"	Bappi Lahiri
