= Dak Bangla (film) =

1987 Indian film by Keshu Ramsay

- Directed by: Keshu Ramsay
- Written by: Kumar Ramsay
- Produced by: Reshma Ramsay
- Starring: Rajan Sippy; Swapna; Ranjeet; Mazhar Khan; Marc Zuber
- Music by: Bappi Lahiri
- Release date: 22 May 1987
- Country: India
- Language: Hindi

Dak Bangla is a Bollywood horror film directed by Keshu Ramsay and produced by Reshma Ramsay released in 1987.

== Plot ==
Ajay moves in with his wife Vaishali to a Dak Bangla as a manager and finds out that not only some bank robbers have invaded that place but also a Mummy walled in the dungeon with a dark past of kingdom era. By the time they broke the wall and try to reveal the secret, people start getting killed one-by-one by the Mummy.

== Cast ==
- Rajan Sippy as Raj
- Swapna as Sapna / Princess Sheeba
- Ranjeet as Shakaal / Khursheed Khan
- Mazhar Khan as Munna
- Marc Zuber as Ajay
- Aloka Bedi as Vaishali
- Beena Banerjee as Diana
- Preeti Ganguly as Komal
- Dilip Dhawan as Prince Kunal
- Narendra Nath as Thakur Maan Singh
- Praveen Kumar Sobti as Ozo / Mummy
- Imtiaz Khan as Devil's priest
- Rajendra Nath as Gareebdas Daulatram
- Sujit Kumar as Jagga
- Viju Khote as Kapoor

== Soundtrack ==
Song	Singer
"Welcome Welcome"	Asha Bhosle
"I Love You Jaanam"	Asha Bhosle
"I Love You Jaanam"	Mohammed Aziz
"Pyare Doston Mere Doston"	Bappi Lahiri
