= Raksha (1982 film) =

- Theatrical release poster
- Directed by: Ravikant Nagaich
- Written by: Charandas Shokh(dialogues)
- Screenplay by: Jyoti Swaroop
- Story by: Srikanth Nehata
- Based on: Rahasya Gudachari by K.S.R. Das
- Produced by: P. Mallikharjuna Rao; Doondy (Presents)
- Starring: Jeetendra; Parveen Babi
- Cinematography: Ravikant Nagaich
- Edited by: Shyam Prasad Mukherjee
- Music by: R. D. Burman
- Production company: Bharathi International Films
- Release date: 1982
- Running time: 127 minutes
- Country: India
- Language: Hindi

Raksha (transl. Defence) is a 1982 Hindi-language spy film, produced by P. Mallikharjuna Rao and directed by Ravikant Nagaich. Starring Jeetendra, Parveen Babi, with music by R. D. Burman. The film is a remake of the 1981 Telugu film Rahasya Gudachari.

== Cast ==
- Jeetendra as Gopal Kishan Pandey / Agent 116
- Parveen Babi as Chanda / Bijli
- Moushumi Chatterjee as Asha (Special appearance)
- Prem Chopra as Big Hardy
- Ranjeet as Daulatram
- Suresh Oberoi as Dr. Sinha
- Satyendra Kapoor as Dr. Shrivastav
- Iftekhar as Secret Services Chief
- Manik Irani as Francis
- Goga Kapoor as Khurana
- Narendranath as Jagat Baba
- Paintal as Goga
- Sajjan as Kedar
- Agha as Chef
- Birbal as Chef
- Polson as Chef
- Praveen Kumar as Daulatram's Henchman

== Soundtrack ==
Lyrics: Anand Bakshi

Song	Singer
"Tere Liye, Mere Liye"	Kishore Kumar
"Mil Gaye, Dil Mil Gaye, Phool Banke Khil Gaye"	Kishore Kumar, Asha Bhosle
"Naye Purane Saal Mein Ek Raat Baki Hai"	Kishore Kumar, Asha Bhosle
"Main Chalta Hoon, Mujhe Jane Do"	Mohammed Rafi, Asha Bhosle
"Jani Dilbar Jani"	Asha Bhosle
