= Mere Jeevan Saathi (1972 film) =

- Directed by: Ravikant Nagaich
- Written by: Prem Manik
- Produced by: Vinod Shah
- Starring: Rajesh Khanna; Tanuja
- Cinematography: Ravikant Nagaich
- Edited by: Bimal Roy
- Music by: R. D. Burman
- Release date: 29 September 1972
- Running time: 142 minutes
- Country: India
- Language: Hindi
- Box office: 4.5 cr

Mere Jeevan Saathi (My Life Partner) is a 1972 Indian film directed by Ravikant Nagaich. Produced by Harish and Vinod Shah, it stars Rajesh Khanna, Tanuja, Sujit Kumar, Bindu, Helen, Utpal Dutt, Nazir Hussain and Rajindranath. Loosely inspired by the 1970 Bengali film Rajkumari, which also starred Tanuja, the film was made at the height of Khanna's popularity and craze after the slight fall in 1971. It was the second movie of Rajesh Khanna with Tanuja after the success of Haathi Mere Saathi (1971). Although the movie was a box office superhit grosser upon its release and received all time classics good reviews from viewers and critics, the soundtrack and songs became very popular and are evergreen. "O Mere Dil Ke Chain" and "Chala Jata Hoon" are still very famous Kishore Kumar melodies from this film.

== Plot ==
Prakash (Rajesh Khanna) is a son of a rich father Seth Govindram (K. N. Singh) who wants to become an artist. His father challenges him to earn a one-time meal from his profession. He accepts the challenge and leaves his father's house. He tries to sell his artistic paintings but fails. Princess Kamini (Helen) a playgirl introduces him to the glamour world and he changes his painting style to modern demands. At heart, he remains an altruistic person. Jyoti (Tanuja) an eye doctor arrives in Bombay from London. Prakash though a gifted painter now a playboy falls in love with her. They become lovers. His past creates problems for him. Kamini turns up at Prakash's house drunk and whilst she was flirting with him, Jyoti arrives and finds them together, she storms off. Prakash insults Kamini and asks her to leave. Dejected Jyoti spurns his attempts to reconcile initially, but when he feigns a suicide attempt by supposedly taking poison and being told the reality of Kamini she reconciles. He proposes to marry her. Jyoti's father (Nazir Hussain) visits Prakash with a bribe and is disgusted with his paintings of the female form and rejects him. However, after seeing Prakash's altruism, he apologizes and they start planning the wedding.

Prakash has a car accident and Kamini finds him and takes him back to her palace. He becomes her prisoner. Jyoti receives a telegram informing her of Prakash's death. Jyoti and her father mourn his death. The bandages on Prakash's face are removed and he discovers that he is blind. She whips and hits him during captivity and vows to behead him. Jyoti is wooed by Captain Vinod (Sujit Kumar), who buys her gifts and says the same lines as Prakash had said. All these remind her of Prakash. To win his heart Kamini takes Prakash to horse riding from where he escapes. He hides behind a rock, and in "hunting" him, Kamini falls off the mountain and dies. He makes his way to the road and is eventually picked up by Captain Vinod, who takes Prakash to his father's house, where he learns that his father died a month ago and now has a new occupant. Captain Vinod takes Prakash to his family home where he and his family nurtures him and allows him to recuperate. Captain Vinod goes to the hospital and asks Jyoti to visit his family home, where he has a friend in need of eye care. Before she can see Prakash, she leaves in a taxi after Vinod's parents pressure her to become their future daughter-in-law. She arrives home and discovers her father has a heart attack and overhears her father saying of his desire for his daughter to marry. She agrees to marry Captain Vinod and the engagement party ensues. Prakash attends the celebration, where he is requested to sing. Jyoti sees him performing and starts crying in the distance.

Later, Vinod rings Jyoti and informs him that he is sending his friend to her eye hospital. Prakash and Jyoti reconcile, and Prakash undergoes eye surgery operated by her. While recuperating, Captain Vinod overhears them in the garden and Prakash stating that he wants to love her not as an invalid, but as a normal man. Both men become tormented, Vinod that he has lost the game of love, and Prakash that he doesn't want to ruin Vinod's happiness, for all that he has done for him. Despite Prakash vowing to leave, Vinod beats up Prakash, and Jyoti arrives and witnesses it. A fight ensues, and just as Vinod is about to kill Prakash, his father (Utpal Dutt) shoots him in the leg. Prakash and Jyoti marry.

== Cast ==
- Rajesh Khanna as Prakash
- Tanuja as Dr. Jyoti
- Sujit Kumar as Captain Vinod
- Bindu as Kamal
- Helen as Kamini
- Sulochana Latkar as Captain Vinod's Mother
- Utpal Dutt as Retired Colonel (Captain Vinod's Father)
- Nazir Hussain as Lalaji (Jyoti's Father)
- K. N. Singh as Seth Govindram (Prakash's Father)
- Brahmachari

== Reception ==
Jerry Pinto says of the film that "Helen's cinematic seniority to the hero, Rajesh Khanna, added an edge to her pursuit of him." David J. Weiner described Mere Jeevan Saathi as "a bizarre, unclassifiable Indian film with music, fantasy, special effects, violence, and flamboyant mise-en-scene." The 2013 review by The Hindu newspaper said: "You could watch the movie for some superb music as only R.D. Burman could have conjured and delivered, film after film, especially if it involved the irrepressible Rajesh Khanna." A religious number, "Apno Ko Kab Hey Ram" and the playful "Chala Jata Hoon Kisi Ki Dhun Mein" strike different notes to prove the versatility of Kishore Kumar, who is at his liveliest in "O Mere Dil Ke Chain" and "Diwana Kar Ke Chodoge" with Lata Mangeshkar. It commands plenty of nostalgic appeals even in present times.

== Soundtrack ==
The music was composed by R. D. Burman and lyrics were by Majrooh Sultanpuri. The soundtrack by R. D. Burman continues to be popular even today.The songs "O Mere Dil Ke Chain", "Deewana Leke Aaya Hai" and "Chala Jaata Hoon", all sung by Kishore Kumar are still very popular. It's said that R. D. Burman was haunted by the tune of "Chala Jaata Hoon" in his dreams. Rajesh Khanna initially did not approve "O Mere Dil Ke Chain", but when director Ravikant Nagaich told to R. D. Burman, he went with the harmonium in Rajesh Khanna's room and came back after 15 minutes saying Khanna had approved the tune.

Song	Singer
"Chala Jaata Hoon"	Kishore Kumar
"O Mere Dil Ke Chain"	Kishore Kumar
"Deewana Leke Aaya Hai"	Kishore Kumar
"Aao Kanhaai Mere Dhaam"	Kishore Kumar
"Kitne Sapne Kitne Armaan"	Kishore Kumar
"Deewana Karke Chhodoge Lagta Hai Yun Humko"	Kishore Kumar, Lata Mangeshkar
"Aao Na, Gale Laga Lo Na"	Asha Bhosle
"Mere Jeevan Saathi"	R. D. Burman
