= Laxmikant–Pyarelal discography =

Laxmikant–Pyarelal were an Indian composer duo, consisting of Laxmikant Shantaram Kudalkar (1937–1998) and Pyarelal Ramprasad Sharma (born 1940). In their career span stretching from 1963 to 1998, they composed music for about 750 movies, working with prominent film-makers.

== Discography ==
Year	Film	Notes
1963	Parasmani	
1963	Harishchandra Taramati	
1964	Sati Savitri	
1964	Sant Gyaneshwar	
1964	Mr. X in Bombay	
1964	Dosti	
1964	Aaya Toofan	
1965	Shreeman Funtoosh	
1965	Lootera	
1965	Hum Sab Ustad Hain	
1965	Boxer	
1965	Bhagya	
1966	Sau Saal Baad	
1966	Pyar Kiye Jaa	
1966	Naag Mandir	
1966	Mere Lal	
1966	Laadla	
1966	Dillagi	
1966	Daku Mangal Singh	
1966	Chhota Bhai	
1966	Aasra	
1966	Aaye Din Bahar Ke	
1967	Taqdeer	
1967	Shagird	
1967	Patthar Ke Sanam	
1967	Night in London	
1967	Milan Ki Raat	
1967	Milan	
1967	Jaal	
1967	Farz	
1967	Duniya Nachegi	
1967	Chhaila Babu	
1967	Anita	
1968	Spy in Rome	
1968	Sadhu Aur Shaitaan	
1968	Raja Aur Runk	
1968	Mere Hamdam Mere Dost	
1968	Izzat	
1968	Baharon Ki Manzil	
1969	Wapas	
1969	Shart	
1969	Satyakam	
1969	Sajan	
1969	Pyasi Sham	
1969	Meri Bhabhi	
1969	Mera Dost	
1969	Madhavi	
1969	Jigri Dost	
1969	Jeene Ki Raah	
1969	Intaquam	
1969	Do Bhai	
1969	Dharti Kahe Pukar Ke	
1969	Aya Sawan Jhoom Ke	
1969	Anjaana	
1969	Aansoo Ban Gaye Phool	
1969	Do Raaste	
1970	Suhana Safar	
1970	Sharafat	
1970	Pushpanjali	
1970	Man Ki Aankhen	
1970	Jeevan Mrityu	
1970	Jawab	
1970	Humjoli	
1970	Himmat	
1970	Devi	
1970	Darpan	
1970	Bachpan	
1970	Khilona	
1970	Maa Aur Mamta	
1970	Abhinetri	
1970	Mastana	
1970	Aan Milo Sajna	
1971	Woh Din Yaad Karo	
1971	Uphaar	
1971	Mera Gaon Mera Desh	
1971	Mehboob Ki Mehndi	
1971	Man Mandir	
1971	Lagan	
1971	Jal Bin Machhli Nritya Bin Bijli	
1971	Haseenon Ka Devata	
1971	Chaahat	
1971	Bikhre Moti	
1971	Banphool	
1971	Aap Aye Bahaar Ayee	
1971	Haathi Mere Saathi	
1972	Wafaa	
1972	Dushmun	
1972	Subha-O-Sham	
1972	Shor	
1972	Shaadi Ke Baad	
1972	Raja Jani	
1972	Raaste Kaa Patthar	
1972	Mome Ki Gudiya	
1972	Jeet	
1972	Haar Jeet	
1972	Gaon Hamara Shaher Tumhara	
1972	Ek Nazar	
1972	Ek Bechara	
1972	Buniyaad	
1972	Piya Ka Ghar	
1972	Dastaan	
1972	Roop Tera Mastana	
1972	Gora Aur Kala	
1973	Sweekar	
1973	Suraj Aur Chanda	
1973	Nirdosh	
1973	Manchali	
1973	Keemat	
1973	Kahani Hum Sab Ki	
1973	Jalte Badan	
1973	Insaaf	
1973	Gaddaar	
1973	Loafer	
1973	Gaai Aur Gori	
1973	Daag: A Poem of Love	
1973	Barkha Bahar	
1973	Anokhi Ada	
1973	Anhonee	
1973	Kuchhe Dhaage	
1973	Gehri Chaal	
1973	Bobby	
1973	Jwaar Bhata	
1974	Vada Tera Vada	
1974	Shandaar	
1974	Sauda	
1974	Roti Kapda Aur Makaan	
1974	Prem Shastra	
1974	Pocket Maar	
1974	Paise Ki Gudiya	
1974	Pugli	
1974	Nirmaan	
1974	Jurm Aur Sazaa	
1974	Farebi	
1974	Duniya Ka Mela	
1974	Badla	
1974	Azad Mohabbat	
1974	Geeta Mera Naam	
1974	Dost	
1974	Naya Din Nai Raat	
1974	Imtihan	
1974	Amir Garib	
1974	Bidaai	
1974	Roti	
1974	Majboor	
1975	Zindagi Aur Toofan	
1975	Zinda Dil	
1975	Sewak	
1975	Dulhan	
1975	Prem Kahani	
1975	Ponga Pandit	
1975	Naatak	
1975	Mere Sajna	
1975	Lafange	
1975	Dafaa 302	
1975	Apne Rang Hazaar	
1975	Aakhri Dao	
1975	Anari	
1975	Aakraman	
1975	Pratiggya	
1975	Chaitali	
1976	Suntan	
1976	Naach Uthe Sansaar	
1976	Maa	
1976	Koi Jeeta Koi Haara	
1976	Do Ladkiyan	
1976	Aap Beati	
1976	Aaj Ka Mahaatma	
1976	Nagin	
1976	Dus Numbri	
1976	Charas	
1976	Jaaneman	
1977	Tinku	
1977	Thief of Baghdad	
1977	Prayashchit	
1977	Ooparwala Jaane	
1977	Mastan Dada	
1977	Kali Raat	
1977	Kachcha Chor	
1977	Jagriti	
1977	Dream Girl	
1977	Chor Sipahee	
1977	Amar Akbar Anthony	
1977	Dildaar	
1977	Dharam Veer	
1977	Chhota Baap	
1977	Chacha Bhatija	
1977	Apnapan	
1977	Anurodh	
1977	Adha Din Adhi Raat	
1977	Immaan Dharam	
1977	Chhailla Babu	
1977	Parvarish	
1977	Palkon Ki Chhaon Mein	
1977	Aashiq Hoon Baharon Ka	
1978	Saawan Ke Geet	
1978	Phaansi	
1978	Kaala Aadmi	
1978	Daku Aur Jawan	
1978	Chakravyuha	
1978	Amar Shakti	
1978	Aahuti	
1978	Badalte Rishtey	
1978	Satyam Shivam Sundaram: Love Sublime	
1978	Phool Khile Hain Gulshan Gulshan	
1978	Main Tulsi Tere Aangan Ki	
1978	Dil Aur Deewar	
1979	Prem Vivah	
1979	Muqabla	
1979	Magroor	
1979	Maan Apmaan	
1979	Amar Deep	
1979	Sargam	
1979	Prem Bandhan	
1979	Gautam Govinda	
1979	Dil Kaa Heera	
1979	Kartavya	
1979	Jaani Dushman	
1979	Yuvraaj	
1979	Suhaag	
1979	Lok Parlok	
1980	Aasha	
1980	Patthar Se Takkar	
1980	Nishana	
1980	Kala Pani	
1980	Judaai	
1980	Ganga Aur Suraj	
1980	Be-Reham	
1980	Bandish	
1980	Do Premee	
1980	Zalim	
1980	Maang Bharo Sajana	
1980	Kali Ghata	
1980	Chunaoti	
1980	Gehrayee	
1980	Yari Dushmani	
1980	Choron Ki Baaraat	
1980	Jyoti Bane Jwala	
1980	Karz	
1980	Dostana	
1980	Ram Balram	
1980	Hum Paanch	
1981	Waqt Ki Deewar	
1981	Sharada	
1981	Aas Paas	
1981	Kranti	
1981	Naseeb	
1981	Ladies Tailor	
1981	Khoon Aur Paani	
1981	Ek Duuje Ke Liye	
1981	Pyaasa Sawan	
1981	Khuda Kasam	
1981	Ek Hi Bhool	
1981	Fiffty Fiffty	
1981	Meri Aawaz Suno	
1981	Ek Aur Ek Gyarah	
1982	Taaqat	
1982	Samraat	
1982	Mehndi Rang Layegi	
1982	Main Intequam Loonga	
1982	Jeeo Aur Jeene Do	
1982	Ghazab	
1982	Farz Aur Kanoon	
1982	Do Dishayen	
1982	Davedar	
1982	Baghavat	
1982	Jeevan Dhaara	
1982	Raaste Pyar Ke	
1982	Apna Bana Lo	
1982	Vakil Babu	
1982	Rajput	
1982	Teesri Aankh	
1982	Desh Premee	
1982	Badle Ki Aag	
1982	Insaan	
1982	Prem Rog	
1982	Teri Maang Sitaron Se Bhar Doon	
1982	Deedar-E-Yaar	
1983	Zara Si Zindagi	
1983	Hero	
1983	Bekaraar	
1983	Andhaa Kaanoon	
1983	Jaanwar	
1983	Avtaar	
1983	Arpan	
1983	Prem Tapasya	
1983	Woh 7 Din	
1983	Mujhe Insaaf Chahiye	
1983	Coolie	
1983	Agami Kal	Bengali film
1984	Zakhmi Sher	
1984	Sharara	
1984	Pakhandi	
1984	Mera Faisla	
1984	Meraa Dost Meraa Dushman	
1984	Jeene Nahi Doonga	
1984	Bad Aur Badnam	
1984	All Rounder	
1984	Akalmand	
1984	Inquilaab	
1984	Ghar Ek Mandir	
1984	Baazi	
1984	Asha Jyoti	
1984	Ek Nai Paheli	
1984	Utsav	
1984	John Jani Janardhan	
1984	Yeh Ishq Nahin Aasaan	
1985	Triveni	
1985	Teri Meherbaniyan	
1985	Patthar Dil	
1985	Kali Basti	
1985	Ghulami	
1985	Mera Jawab	
1985	Do Dilon Ki Dastaan	
1985	Sarfarosh	
1985	Jawaab	
1985	Yaadon Ki Kasam	
1985	Bayen Hath Ka Khel	Unreleased
1985	Meri Jung	
1985	Pyar Jhukta Nahin	
1985	Meraa Ghar Mere Bachche	
1985	Sur Sangam	
1985	Jaanoo	
1985	Sanjog	
1985	Dekha Pyar Tumhara	
1986	Sadaa Suhagan	
1986	Naseeb Apna Apna	
1986	Nagina	
1986	Love 86	
1986	Dosti Dushmani	
1986	Aag Aur Shola	
1986	Qatl	
1986	Swarag Se Sunder	
1986	Aap Ke Saath	
1986	Swati	
1986	Kala Dhanda Goray Log	
1986	Aakhree Raasta	
1986	Amrit	
1986	Pyar Kiya Hai Pyar Karenge	
1986	Karma	
1986	Uyire Unakkaga	Tamil film
1986	Naam	
1986	Mazloom	
1986	Asli Naqli	
1986	Aisa Pyaar Kahan	
1986	Naache Mayuri	
1987	Watan Ke Rakhwale	
1987	Parivaar	
1987	Mera Karam Mera Dharam	
1987	Mard Ki Zabaan	
1987	Majnu	Telugu film
1987	Khazana	
1987	Jawab Hum Denge	
1987	Aulad	
1987	Loha	
1987	Nazrana	
1987	Anjaam	
1987	Hukumat	
1987	Sansar	
1987	Madadgaar	
1987	Mr. India	
1987	Insaaf	
1987	Insaaf Kaun Karega	
1987	Sindoor	
1987	Mangai Oru Gangai	Tamil film
1987	Jaan Hatheli Pe	
1987	Kudrat Ka Kanoon	
1987	Uttar Dakshin	
1987	Insaf Ki Pukar	
1988	Yateem	
1988	Qatil	
1988	Pyaar Mohabbat	
1988	Mar Mitenge	
1988	Inteqam	
1988	Hamara Khandaan	
1988	Bees Saal Baad	
1988	Pyaar Ka Mandir	
1988	Charnon Ki Saugandh	
1988	Khatron Ke Khiladi	
1988	Shoorveer	
1988	Ram-Avtar	
1988	Biwi Ho To Aisi	
1988	Janam Janam	
1988	Ganga Tere Desh Mein	
1988	Dayavan	
1988	Charan Dada	
1988	Tezaab	
1988	Agnee	
1988	Do Waqt Ki Roti	
1989	Sachai Ki Taqat	
1989	Ram Lakhan	
1989	Nigahen: Nagina Part II	
1989	Naag Nagin	
1989	Main Tera Dushman	
1989	Hathyar	
1989	Gharana	
1989	Dost Garibon Ka	
1989	Kasam Suhaag Ki	
1989	Suryaa: An Awakening	
1989	Do Qaidi	
1989	Eeshwar	
1989	Santosh	
1989	Bade Ghar Ki Beti	
1989	Paraya Ghar	
1989	Batwara	
1989	Oonch Neech Beech	
1989	Elaan-E-Jung	
1989	Shehzaade	
1989	Bhrashtachar	
1989	ChaalBaaz	
1990	Majboor	
1990	Kanoon Ki Zanjeer	
1990	Veeru Dada	
1990	Sheshnaag	
1990	Qayamat Ki Raat	
1990	Pyar Ka Karz	
1990	Pati Parmeshwar	
1990	Izzatdaar	
1990	Azaad Desh Ke Gulam	
1990	Atishbaz	
1990	Agneepath	
1990	Amiri Garibi	
1990	Kroadh	
1990	Haatim Tai	
1990	Pati Patni Aur Tawaif	
1990	Hum Se Na Takrana	
1990	Neti Siddhartha	Telugu film
1990	Jeevan Ek Sanghursh	
1990	Amba	
1990	Sher Dil	
1990	Pratibandh	
1990	Jamai Raja	
1991	Aaj Ka Inteqaam	
1991	Pyar Ka Devta	
1991	Khilaaf	
1991	Mast Kalandar	
1991	Hum	
1991	Khoon Ka Karz	
1991	Paap Ki Aandhi	
1991	Deshwasi	
1991	Ajooba	
1991	Benaam Badsha	
1991	Do Matwale	
1991	Qurbani Rang Layegi	
1991	Pyar Hua Chori Chori	
1991	Narsimha	
1991	Saudagar	
1991	Ranbhoomi	
1991	Shankara	
1991	Banjaran	
1991	Akayla	
1991	Prahaar: The Final Attack	
1991	Sapnon Ka Mandir	
1991	Lakshmanrekha	
1991	Aranyadalli Abhimanyu	Kannada film
1992	Sahebzaade	
1992	Khuda Gawah	
1992	Prem Deewane	
1992	Humlaa	
1992	Humshakal	
1992	Heera Ranjha	
1992	Angaar	
1992	Apradhi	
1993	Dil Hi To Hai	
1993	Yugandhar	
1993	Tirangaa	
1993	Kshatriya	
1993	Roop Ki Rani Choron Ka Raja	
1993	Aashik Awara	
1993	Badi Bahen	
1993	Khalnayak	
1993	Dil Hai Betaab	
1993	Gumrah	
1993	Chahoonga Main Tujhe	
1993	Bedardi	
1994	Insaaf Apne Lahoo Se	
1994	Tejasvini	
1994	Chauraha	
1994	Mohabbat Ki Arzoo	
1994	Dilbar	
1995	Prem	
1995	Paappi Devataa	
1995	Trimurti	
1995	Ragasiya Police	Tamil film
1996	Aatank	
1996	Aurat Aurat Aurat	
1996	Rajkumar	
1996	Prem Granth	
1996	Bhairavi	
1997	Mahaanta	
1997	Deewana Mastana	
1997	Kaun Rokega Mujhe	
1997	Mohabbat Ki Aag	
1997	Poonilamazha	Malayalam film
1998	Barsaat Ki Raat	
1998	Maha Yuddh	
1999	Jai Hind	
2004	Meri Biwi Ka Jawaab Nahin	
2026	Hum Mein Shahenshah Koun	Delayed release

== See also ==
- Laxmikant–Pyarelal
