= Jeevankala =

Indian actress

- Born: Jeevankala Kamble; 29 June 1944 (age 82); Pune, Bombay Presidency, British India
- Occupations: Actress, dancer, producer
- Years active: 1952–1992
- Spouse: Ram Kelkar (m. 1969)
- Children: 3

Jeevankala (born 29 June 1944) is an Indian actress and dancer who acted in several Marathi and Hindi films in the 1950s and 1960s.

== Early life ==
Jeevankala was born on 29 June 1944 in Pune, to Dattatreya Kamble and Gangu Bai, both of whom were associated with the silent-film industry as actors. During her childhood, her family lived in the same building as the Mangeshkar family, who were residing in Pune at the time. Lata Mangeshkar, then 14 years old, gave her the name 'Jeevankala'.

She received her early education at Peshwa's School in Huzurpaga, Pune, studying up to the sixth standard. Alongside her studies, she developed an interest in classical dance and began learning Kathak under the guidance of Balasaheb Gokhale Guruji at a young age. Filmmaker Datta Dharmadhikari noticed her and introduced her to cinema by casting her as a child artist in Akher Jamla (1952). She subsequently appeared in the Marathi film Teen Mule (1954). Despite her early involvement in films, Jeevan Kala continued her dance training and gave performances at various Ganesh festival celebrations. In 1956, her family relocated to Bombay. She also became associated with Surel Kala Kendra, a children's music academy run by the Mangeshkar family, where she participated in several performances alongside members of the Mangeshkar family.

== Personal life ==
She married screenwriter and filmmaker Ram Kelkar in 1969, who was known for writing several Hindi films, including Piya Ka Ghar (1972), Be-Imaan (1972), Kalicharan (1976), Vishwanath (1978), Aasha (1980), Hero (1983) and Khal Nayak (1993). Besides screenwriting, Ram Kelkar also directed films such as Duniyadari (1977) and Pyasi Aankhen (1983). The couple have three children: Yogesh, Hemant and Manisha Kelkar. Their daughter, Manisha Kelkar, is an actress who has worked in Marathi and Hindi films.

== Career ==
She began her career in Hindi cinema primarily as a dancer, making her screen debut in Vijay Bhatt's Goonj Uthi Shehnai (1959). She featured in the song "Ankhiyan Bhool Gayi Hain Sona", which brought her early recognition as a dancer. The same year, she appeared in K. Amarnath's Kal Hamara Hai, performing in two songs, "Aise Na Dekho Rasiya" and "Jao Rasiya Hato Jao Rasiya". During the early 1960s, she became associated with several popular Hindi film songs, including "Dil Ka Fasana Koi Na Jaana" from Oomar Qaid (1961) and "Bada Kaatil Hai Mera Yaar" from China Town (1962). Her dancing career included appearances in a number of films across the late 1950s and 1960s. Among these were Zara Bachke, Baazigar and Chhoti Bahen (1959), Alamara Ki Beti, Masoom, Maya Machhendra and Teer Aur Talwar (1960), followed by Kismet Palat Ke Dekh, Pyar Ki Dastan, Sapera, Shola Aur Shabnam and Tel Malish Boot Polish (1961). She also appeared in Banarsi Thug and China Town (1962). One of her widely recognised dance appearances was in Parasmani (1963), where she featured in the song "Hansta Hua Noorani Chehra". She also performed in "Chaandi Ka Badan" from Taj Mahal (1963). Other notable songs associated with her performances included "Baanke Piya Kaho Haan Dagabaaz Ho" from Burma Road (1962), "Uthegi Tumhari Nazar Dheere Dheere" from Ek Raaz (1963), "Allah Kare Tu Bhi Aa Jaye" from Mr. X in Bombay (1964), "Abhi Kamsin Ho Naadan Ho" from Aaya Toofan (1964), "Preet Basi Hai Meri Nas Nas Mein" from Neela Aakash (1965), "Hey Nainwa Nap Her Pher Ke Chalo" from Picnic (1966), and "Aajkal Ke Sabhi Naujawan" from Johar in Bombay (1967).

Alongside dance performances, Jeevankala gradually moved into acting, taking up supporting and character roles. Her early acting appearance was in C. S. Dubey's Kismet Palat Ke Dekh (1961), which featured Anoop Kumar, Daljeet and Durga Khote. She subsequently appeared in Shreeman Funtoosh, starring Kishore Kumar, and expanded her work into Marathi cinema. In 1964, she played the lead opposite Ramesh Deo in C. Mohan's Marathi film Daivacha Khel. Her subsequent filmography included supporting roles in Zindagi Aur Khwab (1961), Char Dervesh, Khooni Khazana, Samson, Aaya Toofan and Mr. X in Bombay (1964), Bharat Milap and Himalay Ki God Mein (1965), Insaaf (1966), Raat Andheri Thi and Johar in Bombay (1967), Saraswatichandra (1968) and The Thief of Baghdad (1969), among other films.

== Filmography ==
Year	Title	Role	Notes
1952	Akher Jamla	Baby	Debut
1958	Detective	Leela	Debut as an actress
1959	Kya Yeh Bombay Hai	Courtesan	
1959	Ardhangini	Dancer	
1959	Kal Hamara Hai	Dancer	
1959	Zara Bachke	Ramkalli	
1959	Chhoti Bahen	Dancer	
1959	Baazigar		
1959	Alamara Ki Beti		
1960	Sangat Jadli Tujhi Ni Majhi	Jeevankala	Marathi
1960	Avaghachi Sansar		Marathi
1960	Umaj Padel Tar		Marathi
1960	Masoom	Kiran	
1960	Maya Macchindra	Dancer	
1961	Putra Vhava Aisa	Nalini	Marathi
1961	Tel Maalish Boot Polish	Miss Happiness	
1961	Zindagi Aur Khwaab		
1961	Shola Aur Shabnam		
1961	Senapati	Malti	
1961	Salaam Mem Saheb	Munnibai	
1961	Razia Sultana		
1961	Pyar Ki Dastan	Tara	
1961	Oomar Qaid	Qawwali Singer	
1962	To Mee Navhech	Lakhoba's wife	Marathi
1962	Ha Maza Marg Ekla		Marathi
1962	Vardakshina		Marathi
1962	Drushti Jagachi Aahe Nirali		Marathi
1962	Chimnyanchi Shala		Marathi
1962	Soonbai		Marathi
1962	China Town	Shanti	
1962	Reporter Raju	Gopi	
1962	Shree Ganesh	Dancer and singer	
1962	Sautela Bhai	Mujra Dancer	
1962	Burmah Road		
1962	Anpadh		
1963	Taj Mahal		
1963	Parasmani	Naagrani	
1963	Kahin Pyar Na Ho Jaye		
1963	Holiday in Bombay	Dancer	
1963	Ek Raaz	Sushma	
1964	Maratha Tituka Melvava	Dancer	Marathi
1964	Kay Ho Chamatkar		Marathi
1964	Vaishakh Vanava		Marathi
1964	Daivacha Khel		Marathi
1964	Tuka Zalase Kalas		Marathi
1964	Khooni Khazana	Lily	
1964	Mr. X. In Bombay	Neena	
1964	Shabnam		
1964	Jantar Mantar	Meena	
1964	Door Gagan Ki Chhaon Mein	Village Girl	
1964	Aaya Toofan	Manju	
1965	Panch Ratan	Dancer	
1965	Himalay Ki Godmein	Bindiya	
1965	Bharat Milap	Mandvi	
1965	Khandan	Sati	
1965	Mere Sanam	Dancer	
1965	Tarzan Comes to Delhi	Dancer	
1965	Shreeman Funtoosh	Rita	
1965	Noor Mahal	Dancer	
1965	Neela Akash	Jeevankala	
1965	Mahabharat		
1965	Bhakta Prahlad		Marathi
1966	Sheras Savva Sher	Sandhya	Marathi
1966	Veer Bajrang		
1966	Afsana	Jagdish	
1966	Sawan Ki Ghata	Courtesan	In the song of “Khuda Huzoor Ko"
1966	Picnic	Stage performer	
1966	Insaaf	Chhaliya's love interest	
1967	Sudarshan		Marathi
1967	Ram Rajya		
1967	Raat Andheri Thi		
1967	Milan Ki Raat		
1967	Johar In Bombay	Sunita	
1968	Saraswatichandra	Chandrakant's wife	
1968	Anjaam		
1968	Dil Ne Phir Yaad Kiya	Dancer	
1968	Toofan		
1968	The Thief of Baghdad	Shama	
1968	Patthar Ke Khwab		
1968	Manacha Mujra	Chandra	
1969	Janaki		Producer Marathi
1969	Manacha Mujra		Marathi
1970	Kali Baiko	Dancer	Marathi
1970	Veer Amarsingh Rathod	Champa	
1971	Umeed	Dancer	
1992	Dilli Ka Dada		
