= Mohan Choti =

Indian actor (1935–1992)

- Born: Mohan Rakshakar; 1935; Amravati, Central Provinces and Berar, British India
- Died: 1 February 1992 (aged 56–57); Bombay, Maharashtra, India
- Occupations: Actor, comedian
- Years active: 1954–1992

Mohan Choti (1935 – 1 February 1992) was an Indian actor who worked as a comedian in Hindi films. The name Mohan Choti came from a fictional character of the same name from the 1957 film Musafir, in which he plays a tea shop delivery boy who sports a "choti" or traditional lock of hair on the top of his head.

== Biography ==
Mohan Choti was born as Mohan Rakshakar to Constable Atmaram Rakshakar in 1935 at Amravati, Amravati District Maharashtra.

He produced and directed two films — "Dhoti Lota Aur Chowpatty" and "Hunterwali 77". He also opened a restaurant which was called "Sawal roti ka; Dhaba choti ka". He also started Atta distribution unit called "Choti Walla Atta".

He died on 1 February 1992 at the age of 57.

== Filmography ==
Mohan Choti acted in nearly 280 films from 1954 to 1994.

- 1954 Jagriti
- 1955 Devdas
- 1956 Parivar
- 1957 Ek Gaon Ki Kahani
- 1957 Musafir
- 1957 Ab Dilli Door Nahin
- 1957 Hum Panchhi Ek Daal Ke
- 1958 Chalti Ka Naam Gaadi
- 1959 C.I.D. Girl
- 1959 Dhool Ka Phool
- 1959 Nai Raahen
- 1959 Duniya Na Mane
- 1959 Kaagaz Ke Phool
- 1959 Barkha
- 1960 Patang
- 1960 Dil Bhi Tera Hum Bhi Tere
- 1960 Ek Phool Char Kaante
- 1961 Pyaar Ki Dastaan
- 1961 Guddi as Batura (1961) Punjabi Movie
- 1961 Boy Friend
- 1961 Pyaar Ka Saagar
- 1961 Umar Qaid
- 1961 Chhaya
- 1962 Pyar Ki Jeet
- 1962 Dil Tera Diwana
- 1962 Private Secretary
- 1962 Raaz Ki Baat
- 1962 Rakhi
- 1962 Anpadh
- 1962 Shaadi
- 1962 Apna Banake Dekho
- 1962 Jhoola
- 1962 Burmah Road
- 1962 Main Chup Rahungi
- 1962 Man-Mauji
- 1963 Been Ka Jadoo
- 1963 Mujhe Jeene Do
- 1963 Jab Se Tumhe Dekha Hai
- 1963 Taj Mahal
- 1963 Bluff Master
- 1964 Maain Bhi Ladki Hun
- 1964 Tarzan Aur Jalpari
- 1964 Shabnam
- 1964 Ek Din Ka Badshah
- 1964 Darasingh: Ironman
- 1964 Daal Me Kala-Hajjam
- 1964 Mama Ji (1964) Punjabi Movie
- 1964 Pooja Ke Phool
- 1964 Samson
- 1964 Sati Savitri
- 1964 Woh Kaun Thi?
- 1964 Ziddi
- 1964 Mera Qasoor Kya Hai
- 1964 Mr. X in Bombay
- 1965 Gopal - Krishna
- 1965 Jahan Sati Wahan Bhagwan
- 1965 Bekhabar
- 1965 Ek Saal Pehle
- 1965 Rustom-E-Hind
- 1965 Shreeman Funtoosh
- 1965 Khandaan
- 1965 Bhoot Bungla
- 1965 Guide
- 1966 Shankar Khan
- 1966 Lal Bangla
- 1966 Dada
- 1966 Daadi Maa
- 1966 Do Badan
- 1966 Aakhri Khat
- 1966 Sawan Ki Ghata
- 1966 Love in Tokyo
- 1967 Raat Andheri Thi
- 1967 Aag
- 1967 Farz
- 1967 Aurat
- 1967 Upkar as Mangal
- 1968 Lutera Aur Jadugar
- 1968 Aanchal Ke Phool
- 1968 Jung Aur Aman
- 1968 Brahmachari
- 1968 Aadmi
- 1968 Abhilasha
- 1968 Raja Aur Runk
- 1968 Kahin Din Kahin Raat
- 1969 Sapna
- 1969 Jiyo Aur Jeene Do
- 1969 Tumse Achha Kaun Hai
- 1969 Chanda Aur Bijli
- 1969 Anjan Hai Koyee
- 1969 Do Raaste
- 1969 Patthar Ke Khwab
- 1969 Ek Shriman Ek Shrimati
- 1969 Anjaana
- 1970 Raate Ke Andhere Mein
- 1970 Tum Haseen Main Jawan
- 1970 Truck Driver
- 1970 Pagla Kahin Ka
- 1970 Gunah Aur Kanoon
- 1970 Sharafat
- 1970 Kab? Kyoon? Aur Kahan?
- 1970 Bhai-Bhai
- 1970 Yaadgaar
- 1971 Maata Vaishno Devi
- 1971 Ek Din Aadhi Raat
- 1971 Sansar
- 1971 Preet Ki Dori
- 1971 Lakhon Me Ek
- 1971 Ek Nari Ek Brahmachari
- 1971 Pyar Ki Kahani
- 1971 Haseenon Ka Devata
- 1971 Albela
- 1971 Aisa Bhi Hota Hai
- 1971 Mera Gaon Mera Desh
- 1972 Amar Prem
- 1972 Ek Khiladi Bawan Pattey
- 1972 Bees Saal Pehle
- 1972 Do Chor
- 1972 Parchhaiyan
- 1972 Double Cross
- 1972 Raaste Kaa Patthar
- 1972 Achha Bura
- 1972 Anokhi Pehchan
- 1972 Shehzada
- 1972 Tangewala
- 1972 Victoria No. 203
- 1973 Naag Mere Saathi
- 1973 Jhoom Utha Akash
- 1973 Alam Ara
- 1973 Taxi Driver
- 1973 Intezaar
- 1973 Dharma
- 1973 Gaai Aur Gori
- 1973 Jaise Ko Taisa
- 1973 Yauwan
- 1974 Ganga
- 1974 Doosri Sita
- 1974 Amir Garib
- 1974 Jai Radhe Krishna
- 1974 Kasauti
- 1975 Toofani Aur Bijlee
- 1975 Shree Satyanarayan Ki Maha Pooja
- 1975 Daku Aur Bhagwan
- 1975 Dafaa 302
- 1975 Dharmatma
- 1975 Dhoti Lota Aur Chowpatty
- 1975 Aag Aur Toofan
- 1975 Qaid
- 1975 Aakhri Dao
- 1975 Raftaar
- 1975 Jaggu
- 1975 Apne Dushman
- 1975 Balak Aur Janwar
- 1975 Varaat
- 1975 Biwi Kiraya Ki
- 1975 Ek Gaon ki Kahani
- 1976 Noor E Ilaahi
- 1976 Bhagwan Samaye Sansar Mein
- 1976 Sikka
- 1976 Noor-E-Irani
- 1976 Play-Boy
- 1976 Shankar Dada
- 1976 Bairaag
- 1976 Khalifa
- 1977 Hunterwali
- 1977 Do Dilwale
- 1977 Angaare
- 1977 Dream Girl
- 1978 Toofani Takkar
- 1978 Phaansi
- 1978 Dhyanu Bhagat
- 1978 Chakravyuha
- 1978 Parmatma
- 1978 Apna Khoon
- 1978 Azaad
- 1978 Khoon Ka Badla Khoon
- 1979 Teen Chehrey
- 1979 Sultan E Hind: Gharib Nawaz
- 1979 Bhakti Mein Shakti
- 1979 Shaitan Mujrim
- 1979 Bombay by Nite
- 1979 Janta Hawaldar
- 1979 Hamare Tumhare
- 1979 Har Har Gange
- 1979 Khandaan
- 1979 Maan Apmaan
- 1980 Banmanush
- 1980 Saboot
- 1980 Chunaoti
- 1980 Nishana
- 1980 Phir Wohi Raat
- 1981 Jai Baba Amarnath
- 1981 Maan Gaye Ustaad
- 1981 Nai Imarat
- 1981 Be-Shaque
- 1981 Farz Aur Pyar
- 1981 Commander
- 1981 Bandish
- 1981 Naseeb
- 1981 Guru Suleman Chela Pahelwan
- 1981 Hum Se Badkar Kaun
- 1981 Jwala Daku
- 1982 Sumbandh
- 1982 Aadat Se Majboor
- 1982 Apna Bana Lo
- 1982 Ashanti
- 1982 Teri Maang Sitaron Se Bhar Doon
- 1982 Chorni
- 1983 Humse Naa Jeeta Koi
- 1983 Jaanwar
- 1983 Film Hi Film
- 1983 Jaani Dost
- 1983 Sant Ravidas Ki Amar Kahani
- 1983 Humse Na Jeeta Koi
- 1983 Jai Baba Amarnath
- 1983 Bekaraar
- 1983 Mehndi
- 1983 Daulat Ke Dushman
- 1984 Maang Bharo Sajana
- 1984 Yaadgaar
- 1984 Abodh
- 1984 Naya Kadam
- 1984 Phulwari (1984 film)
- 1984 Aaj Ka M.L.A. Ram Avtar
- 1984 Raaj Tilak
- 1984 Raja Aur Rana
- 1984 Hum Hain Lajawaab
- 1984 Tohfa
- 1984 Boxer
- 1984 Zindagi Jeene Ke Liye
- 1984 Dharam Aur Kanoon
- 1985 Piya Milan
- 1985 Insaaf Main Karoonga
- 1985 Pataal Bhairavi
- 1985 Ek Chitthi Pyar Bhari
- 1985 Ghar Dwaar
- 1985 Alag Alag
- 1985 Hum Dono
- 1985 Sur Sangam
- 1986 Begaana
- 1986 Jaal
- 1986 Sadaa Suhagan
- 1986 Insaaf Ki Awaaz
- 1986 Kala Dhanda Goray Log
- 1986 Chambal Ka Badshah
- 1986: Naache Mayuri
- 1986 Zinda Laash
- 1987 Khooni Darinda
- 1987 Hamari Jung
- 1987 Dadagiri
- 1987 Pyaar Karke Dekho
- 1987 Hamari Jung
- 1987 Kalyug Aur Ramayan
- 1987 Goraa
- 1988 Vikram Aur Betaal
- 1988 Shiv Ganga
- 1988 Paigham
- 1988 Jungle Ki Beti
- 1988 Qatil
- 1988 Chintamani Surdas
- 1988 Maar Dhaad
- 1988 Falak (1988 film)
- 1988 Aurat Teri Yehi Kahani
- 1989 Na-Insaafi
- 1989 Naqab
- 1989 Hum Intezaar Karenge
- 1989 Bade Ghar Ki Beti
- 1989 Teri Payal Mere Geet
- 1989 Touhean
- 1989 Mahaadev
- 1989 Dana Paani
- 1989 Vishwamitra as Nakshatrik (TV series)
- 1990 Zahreelay
- 1990 Thanedaar
- 1990 Muqaddar Ka Badshaah
- 1990 Doodh Ka Karz
- 1990 Shandaar
- 1990 Majboor
- 1991 Ajooba as Ladies Tailor (Special Appearance)
- 1991 Khatra as Havaldar Mastram
- 1992 Naseebwaala
- 1992 Sarphira
- 1993 Shuruaat
- 1993 Kala Coat
- 1993 Badi Bahen
- 1994 Mere Data Garib Nawaz
- 1994 Do Fantoosh
