= Dhamkee =

- Directed by: Kalpataru
- Written by: Ayaz (script)
- Starring: Vinod Khanna; Kumkum
- Cinematography: Dara Engineer
- Music by: Ganesh
- Production company: Tasveer Movies
- Release date: 20 July 1973
- Country: India
- Language: Hindi

Dhamkee is a 1973 Bollywood drama film directed by Kalpataru. The film stars Vinod Khanna & Kumkum in lead roles.

== Cast ==
- Vinod Khanna as CBI Inspector Rajesh
- Kumkum as Roopa Mishra
- Bela Bose as Lily Dancer
- Jayshree T. as Asha
- Junior Mehmood as Mamo
- Ramesh Deo as
- M.B. Shetty as Goon
- Ramayan Tiwari as Professor, Asha,s dad
- Jagdish Raj as CBI Chief
- Meena Talpade as Rekha ,Villain Chief
- Subhash Ghai as CBI Inspector (Cameo)
- Helen as Monica
- Imtiaz as Imtiaz (Cameo)
- Ranjeet as CBI Inspector Gopal (Cameo)
- Brahm Bhardwaj as Dr. Mehta, Roopa,s dad
- Uma Dhawan as Chief Assistant Surekha (Cameo)

== Soundtrack ==
| Song | Singer |
|---|---|
| "Chand Kya Hai, Roop Ka Darpan" | Kishore Kumar, Asha Bhosle |
| "Kali Se Nazaron Se" | Kishore Kumar |
| "Yaaron Mujhe Peene Do" | Asha Bhosle |
| "Kaun Wafadaar Hai, Kaun Bewafa Hai" | Asha Bhosle, Usha Mangeshkar |
| "Humsafar O Humsafar, Humsafar Gham Na Kar" | Asha Bhosle, Usha Mangeshkar |
