= Anjaan Hai Koi =

- Directed by: Babubhai Mistri
- Written by: Jaffar (additional dialogue); Charandas Shokh
- Produced by: Anandrao Brahambhatt; Harishbhai Mistry
- Starring: Feroz Khan; Nalini
- Cinematography: Peter Pereira
- Edited by: I.M. Kunnu
- Music by: Usha Khanna, Lyrics : Asad Bhopali
- Release date: 1969
- Country: India
- Language: Hindi

Anjaan Hai Koi is a 1969 Hindi-language drama film directed by Babubhai Mistri. The film stars Feroz Khan and Nalini. The film's music is by Usha Khanna with lyrics by Asad Bhopali.

== Cast ==
- Feroz Khan as Anand
- Nalini as Sandhya
- Helen as Bijli
- Aruna Irani as Seema
- Agha as Advocate Narayan Das
- Jayshree T.
- Mohan Choti as Badal
- Birbal
- Polson

== Soundtrack ==
1. "Mehbooba Dilwalon Ki" – Mohammed Rafi
2. "Anjaan Hai Koi" – Mohammed Rafi
3. "Baar Baar Mana Kiya" – Suman Kalyanpur
4. "Shaam Dekho Dhal Rahi Hai" – Mohammed Rafi, Usha Khanna
5. "Matka Haay Re Haay Matka" – Mahendra Kapoor, Jaspal Singh
6. "Gilason Me Jo Doobe" – Asha Bhosle
