= Dada (1979 film) =

- Theatrical Poster
- Directed by: Jugal Kishore
- Produced by: Jugal Kishore
- Starring: Vinod Mehra; Bindiya Goswami; Amjad Khan; Jeevan
- Music by: Usha Khanna; Lyrics by Ravindra Jain; Asad Bhopali; Kulwant Jani; Gauhar Kanpuri
- Production company: Jugal Productions Combines
- Release date: 1979
- Running time: 137 minutes
- Country: India
- Language: Hindi

Dada is a 1979 Hindi Bollywood film directed and produced by Jugal Kishore, starring Vinod Mehra, Bindiya Goswami, Amjad Khan, Jeevan in pivotal roles.

== Cast ==
- Vinod Mehra as Moti / Jeetu
- Bindiya Goswami as Kamini
- Amjad Khan as Fazlu
- Jeevan as Bihari
- Raza Murad as Raghu / Jaggu (Double Role)
- Jagdeep as Jagdeep / Fake Moti
- Shashi Puri as Basheer
- Madhu Malini as Bobby
- Ramesh Deo as Pyarelal
- Indrani Mukherjee as Mrs. Pyarelal
- Satyendra Kapoor as Dharamdas
- Seema Deo as Tara
- Pallavi Joshi as Munni
- Rajendranath as Alibhai Motorwala
- Mohan Sherry as Lawyer / Public Prosecutor

== Soundtrack ==
Music composed by Usha Khanna.

Song	Singer	Lyricist	Raga
"Dil Ke Tukde Tukde Karke Muskurake Chal Diye"	K. J. Yesudas	Kulwant Jani	Bhimpalasi
"Humne Maana Humpe Sajan"	Suman Kalyanpur	Mahendra Dehlvi	
"Hum Sabko Nek Raah"	Suman Kalyanpur	Asad Bhopali	
"Parde Mein Koi Baitha Hai Parda Karke"	Mohammed Rafi, Shailendra Singh	Asad Bhopali	
"Gaddi Jandi"	Mohammed Rafi, Shailendra Singh, Hemlata, Dilraj Kaur	Ravindra Jain	

== Awards and nominations ==
- Filmfare Award for Best Supporting Actor – Amjad Khan as Fazlu
- Filmfare Award for Best Male Playback Singer – K. J. Yesudas for the song "Dil Ke Tukde Tukde Karke"
