= Jantar Mantar (film) =

- Film poster
- Directed by: Radhakant
- Story by: Pandit Girish
- Starring: Mahipal; Vijaya Choudhury; Ulhas
- Cinematography: M.C. Narasimha
- Edited by: I.M. Kunnu
- Music by: Sardar Malik
- Distributed by: Mohan Studios
- Release date: 1964
- Country: India
- Language: Hindi

Jantar Mantar is a 1964 Hindi fantasy drama film directed by Radhakant. It starred Mahipal, Vijaya Choudhury and Ulhas in lead roles. The music for the film was composed by Sardar Malik.

== Cast ==
- Mahipal as Kumar
- Vijaya Choudhury as Nilam Pari
- Ulhas as Kaal Bhairav
- Mohan Sherry as Kankaal
- Jeevankala
- Babu Raje
- Mridula Rani

== Soundtrack ==
The music of the film was composed by Sardar Malik with lyrics by Hasrat Jaipuri.

#	Title	Singer(s)
1	"Kya Kahein Tujhse Mohabbat Ho Gayi"	Asha Bhosle
2	"Jaadu Dekhe Tone Dekhe"	Mohammed Rafi, Suman Kalyanpur
3	"Yun Na Hamein Dekhiye"	Mohammed Rafi, Suman Kalyanpur
4	"Deewane Na Ja Re"	Suman Kalyanpur
5	"Jaanewale Laut Ke Aana"	Asha Bhosle
6	"Ek Deewana Aayega Ek Mastana Aayega"	Asha Bhosle, Kamal Barot
