= Kumkum (actress) =

Indian actress (1934–2020)

- Born: Zebunnissa Khan; 8 June 1938; Hussainabad of Sheikhpura, Bihar, British India
- Died: 28 July 2020 (aged 82); Mumbai, Maharashtra, India
- Occupations: Actress, Film Producer
- Years active: 1952–1973
- Spouse: Sajjad Akbar Khan (m. 1975)
- Children: Sayyeda Andaleeb Khan

Kumkum (born Zebunnissa Khan; 8 June 1938 – 28 July 2020) was an Indian actress who appeared in Hindi and Bhojpuri films. With a career spanning just across two decades from the entire 1950s and 1960s until the early 1970s, she is widely remembered for her dancing numbers besides her ability to play both lead as well as second lead and character roles across several films with ease and perfection. She was one of the most popular actresses of her time.

She is best known for her roles in Ankhen (1968), Lalkar (1972), Mother India (1957), Mr. X in Bombay (1964), Dil Bhi Tera Hum Bhi Tere (1960), Son of India (1962), Kohinoor (1960), Ujala (1959), Naya Daur (1957), Shreeman Funtoosh (1965), Ek Sapera Ek Lutera (1966), Ganga Ki Lahren (1964), Raja Aur Runk (1968), Geet (1970) and Ek Kunwari Ek Kunwara (1973). She paired with many film heroes of her era and was popular in roles alongside Kishore Kumar.

Kumkum also acted in Bhojpuri films, starting with Ganga Maiyya Tohe Piyari Chadhaibo (1963), which was also the first ever Bhojpuri film.

== Early life ==
Kumkum's birth name is Zebunnissa. As per a tribute post to her on X by her daughter Sayyeda Andaleeb Khan following her demise on 28 July 2020, Kumkum was born on 8 June 1938. She was born in a Shia Islam family to Nawab Manzoor Hassan Khan, a landlord of Hussainabad near Patna and Sayyeda Khursheeda Bano. Her family had shifted to Patna when she was around two years old. Though she hailed from a Nawab family, the family wealth and inheritance gradually deteriorated over time. Eventually, when she turned five years old, her family had to relocate from Patna to Kolkata for a source of living.

== Career and personal life ==
She initially arrived in Bombay (Mumbai) for a leisure trip in 1952. Having been fond of dancing since her childhood, she formally learnt dancing from the renowned Kathak dancer Pandit Shambhu Maharaj in Lucknow after having completed her schooling. Her connection with Lucknow acquainted her with music director Naushad Ali who knew her even before she entered films since he himself hailed from Lucknow. As a result of a chance encounter with him, news of the arrival of a young and new dancer spread across film units in Bombay. This eventually led her to her first film Sheesha (1952) in which she performed the dance number "Angana Baaje Shehnai Re, Aaj Mori Jagmag Atariya" sung by Shamshad Begum. Following a few more films as a singer-dancer she attained fame and success through Guru Dutt's Aar Paar (1954) which she got only after Censor Board demanded a change in the song's picturization such that instead of Jagdeep lip-syncing, it should be done by a lady. It was only then that Kumkum was cast for this uncredited role after a screen test. She also got to act in a full fledged role for the first time once again through Guru Dutt's next film Mr. & Mrs. 55 (1955). Though casting her in the role of a mother of five met with opposition from Guru Dutt's cinematographer V. K. Murthy who felt she herself she was too young for that role, Dutt nevertheless cast her. The success of the film further established her. Later, Kumkum was again seen in a small role in Guru Dutt's Pyaasa (1957). The famous song "Yeh Hai Bombay Meri Jaan" from C.I.D (1956), a film produced by Guru Dutt, sung by Geeta Dutt and Mohammed Rafi was picturized on her and Johhny Walker respectively, she had a role in the film too. She was also paired alongside Shammi Kapoor in a side role in Mem Sahib (1956) and also in lead opposite Shammi Kapoor in Char Dil Char Raahein (1959). She became the first heroine to be cast opposite Dharmendra in his debut film Dil Bhi Tera Hum Bhi Tere in 1960.

She showed her dancing talents in the film Kohinoor (1960) with Dilip Kumar, "Madhuban Mein Radhika Nache Re" and "Haye Jaadugar Qaatil, Haazir Hai Mera Dil", sung by Asha Bhosle for Naushad were picturized on Kumkum. She was paired opposite Kishore Kumar in films like Baghi Shahzada (1964), Ganga Ki Lahren (1964), Shreeman Funtoosh (1965), Haaye Mera Dil (1968) and Mr. X in Bombay (1964). The songs like "Khoobsurat Haseena" and "Mere Mehboob Qayamat Hogi" from Mr. X in Bombay, "Ijazat Ho Toh" from Haaye Mera Dil, "Sultana Sultana" from Shreeman Funtoosh and "Machalti Hui" from Ganga Ki Lahren, which were picturized on the pair Kishore-Kumkum remains popular since their release to this day. Throughout her career, she acted in every kind of film, ranging from films of high profile banners with top stars to small budget films as well.

Kumkum was a favorite choice for writer director Ramanand Sagar. Sagar decided to cast Kumkum as Dharmendra's sister in Ankhen, a super hit film of 1968. In 1970, for Geet, Kumkum was Ramanand Sagar's choice for a small role. In the 1972 hit film Lalkar, she was one of the four main leads and was paired opposite Dharmendra. Kumkum was paired with Kiran Kumar in Jalte Badan (1973), produced, directed and written once again by Sagar. She was paired opposite Vinod Khanna in Dhamkee in 1973 and the duet song "Chand Kya Hai Roop Ka Darpan" became hugely popular. She was paired opposite Pran in the comedy film Ek Kuwara Ek Kuwari, directed by Prakash Mehra, which was a blockbuster. She also starred opposite the then newcomer Sanjeev Kumar in several films which includes Smuggler (1966), Raja Aur Runk (1968), Gunah Aur Kanoon (1970) etc. Her last film was Ramanand Sagar's Jalte Badan (1973) opppsite Kiran Kumar though her last release was the much delayed film Bombay By Nite (1976) opposite Sanjeev Kumar. Following her marriage to Sajjad Akbar Khan in 1975, she shifted to Saudi Arabia where her husband (who originally hailed from Lucknow) was based, thereby leaving the film industry. She spent the next 20 years there with her husband and daughter before returning back to India in 1995. She died on 28 July 2020 at age 82 in Mumbai.

== Bhojpuri Films ==
Kumkum was one of the top stars in the first phase of Bhojpuri films which began with Ganga Maiyya Tohe Piyari Chadhaibo (1962). In his book, Cinema Bhojpuri, Avijit Ghosh writes that she also acted in Laagi Nahi Chhute Ram (1963), Balma Bada Nadaan (1964), Naihar Chhutal Jaye (1964), Bhouji (1965) and Ganga (1965), which was also her home production. "Two heroines who ruled the first phase of Bhojpuri films were Kumkum and Naaz. Scripts were often written around their characters and to their credit, they often proved equal to the task," Ghosh writes in the same book.

== Filmography ==
=== Hindi ===
Year	Film	Role	Notes
1952	Sheesha	Singer-dancer	Debut film; appeared as a singer-dancer in the song "Angana Baaje Shehnai Re, Aaj Mori Jagmag Atariya".
1953	Ansoo		
1954	Aar Paar	Singing laborer	Uncredited role as the laborer singing the song "Kabhi Aar Kabhi Paar Laaga Teere Nazar...".
1954	Amar Kirtan		
1954	Gawaiya		
1954	Meenaar	Singer-dancer	Uncredited appearance as the performer of the song "Le Le Bahaar Mein Bahaar Ke Maze...".
1954	Mirza Ghalib	Courtesan	Uncredited appearances as the singing courtesan in the songs "Ganga Ki Reti Pe..." & "Chali Pee Ke Nagar...".
1954	Noor Mahal		
1955	Bindiya		
1955	Haseena		
1955	Hatim Tai Ki Beti		
1955	House No. 44	Prostitute	Uncredited appearance
1955	Jasoos		
1955	Joru Ka Bhai		
1955	Kundan	Lady shopkeeper whom Jokhuram (Om Prakash) flirts with	Guest appearance as the female performer in the song "Meri Jaan Gair Ko Tum Paan Khilaya Na Karo...".
1955	Milap	Prostitute	Special appearance as the performer in the song "Piya Khul Ke Na Nain Milaaye Re...".
1955	Mr. & Mrs. 55	Preetam Kumar's sister-in-law	
1955	Musafirkhana	Singer-dancer	Guest appearance as the performer of the song "Arey Palti Re Palti Kismat Palti...".
1955	Nav Ratri		
1955	Pyara Dushman		
1955	Raj Kanya		
1955	Rukhsana		
1955	Sati Madalasa		
1955	Society		
1956	Anokha Jungle		
1956	Basant Bahar	Radhika	
1956	Basant Panchami		
1956	Bhagam Bhag	Singer-dancer	Guest appearance as the performer in the song "Chhalke Chanda Ka Paimaana...".
1956	C. I. D.	Master's girlfriend	
1956	Dashera		
1956	Dhola Maru		
1956	Ek Hi Rasta	Singer-dancer	Guest appearance as one of the 2 performers in the song "Kaisi Lagi Jaaye To Jaaye Jiya...".
1956	Funtoosh	Club singer-dancer	Guest appearance as the performer in the song "Ae Johnny Jeene Mein Kya Hai..."
1956	Gauri Pooja		
1956	Hamara Watan		
1956	Kala Chor		
1956	Kar Bhala		
1956	Lalkar		
1956	Malika		
1956	Mem Sahib	Kamini	
1956	Mr. Chakram		
1956	Naqab Posh		
1956	Naya Andaz	Raina	
1956	Samundari Daku		
1956	Sipah Salar		
1956	Zindagi Ke Mele		
1957	Anjali	Rohini's friend	
1957	Arpan	Rohini's friend	Abridged version of Anjali (1957)
1957	Baarish	Kamli	
1957	Bada Bhai		
1957	Bansri Bala		
1957	Dushman	Gulnar	
1957	Mother India	Champa	
1957	Naya Daur	Singer-dancer	Guest appearance as one of the 2 performers in the song "Reshmi Salwar Kurta Jaali Ka...".
1957	Patal Pari		
1957	Pyaasa	Juhi	
1957	Ustad		
1958	Bhala Admi		
1958	Ghar Sansar	Jyoti	
1958	Kabhi Andhera Kabhi Ujala		
1958	Mr. Qartoon M. A.	Kusum	
1958	Sachhe Ka Bolbala		
1958	Suvarna Sundari	Pratima	
1959	Char Dil Char Rahen	Stella D'Souza	
1959	Commander		
1959	Do Gunde	Tulsi	
1959	Gokul Ka Chor		
1959	Kali Topi Lal Rumal	Rani	
1959	Madhu		
1959	Shararat	Jyoti	
1959	Ujala	Kammo	
1960	Bambai Ki Billi		
1960	Barood	Bindiya	
1960	Bhaktaraj		
1960	Dil Bhi Tera Hum Bhi Tere	Sonu Mangeshkar	
1960	Duniya Jhukti Hai	Balma	
1960	Ghar Ki Laj	Shobha Rai	
1960	Kala Bazar	(Herself)	Fleeting appearance as one of the film stars who attended the premiere of Mother India (1957) also starring her, at Maratha Mandir.
1960	Kohinoor	Rajlakshmi	
1960	Nache Nagin Baje Been	Rani	
1960	Rangeela Raja		
1960	Shan-e-Hind		
1960	Tu Nahin Aur Sahi	Geeta	
1961	Aplam Chaplam		
1961	Krorepati	Meena	
1961	Salaam Mem Saheb	Kamini	
1961	Shola Jo Bhadke		
1961	Tel Malish Boot Polish	Sheil Pandey	
1962	Burmah Road	Deepa	
1962	King Kong	Radhi	
1962	Sher Khan		
1962	Son Of India	Kamala	
1963	Jab Se Tumhen Dekha Hai	Qawwali singer-dancer	One of the performers in the qawwali "Tumhe Husn Deke Khuda Ne Sitamgar Banaya Banaya...".
1964	Baghi Shahzada	Zeenat	
1964	Ganga Ki Lahren	Uma	
1964	Kawali Ki Raat	Shaheen	
1964	Mr. X In Bombay	Shobha Mathur	
1965	Ek Sapera-Ek Lutera	Radha	
1965	Sab Ka Ustad	Shyama	
1965	Shreeman Funtoosh	Meena	
1966	La Bela	Radha	
1966	Main Wohi Hoon	Asha	
1966	Smuggler	Bela	
1966	So Saal Baad		
1967	Aayega Aaney Wala	Meera alias Shobha	
1967	Dilruba		
1967	Duniya Nachegi	Rekha	
1967	Gunehgar	Mala	
1968	Ankhen	Sunanda	
1968	Haye Mera Dil	Kamala (mother) & Sangeeta (daughter)	Double role
1968	Raja Aur Runk	Madhavi	
1968	Teri Talaash Mein		
1969	Nai Zindagi		
1970	Dharti	Rosie	
1970	Geet	Janaki (Jankho)	
1970	Gunah Aur Kanoon	Poonam	
1970	Veer Amarsingh Rathod	Chandrawati	
1971	Ek Din Aadhi Raat	Usha	
1972	Aan Baan	Dulari	
1972	Lalkar	Toshi	
1973	Ek Kunwari Ek Kunwara	Tara	
1973	Dhamkee	Roopa Mishra	
1973	Jalte Badan	Ganga	Last film & role
1976	Bombay By Nite	Sushma	Last released film (delayed by several years)

=== Bhojpuri ===
Year	Film	Role	Notes
1962	Ganga Maiyya Tohe Piyari Chadhaibo	Sumitri	
1963	Laagi Nahi Chhute Ram	Chanda	
1964	Balma Bada Nadaan		
1964	Naihar Chhutal Jaye		
1965	Bhouji		
1965	Ganga	Ganga	Also producer
