= Ashanti (1982 film) =

- Theatrical poster
- Directed by: Umesh Mehra
- Written by: Ravi Kapoor; Mohan Kaul
- Produced by: Umesh Mehra
- Starring: Rajesh Khanna; Mithun Chakraborty; Zeenat Aman; Parveen Babi; Shabana Azmi; Kanwaljeet Singh; Amrish Puri
- Edited by: M. S. Shinde
- Music by: R. D. Burman
- Release date: 7 May 1982
- Running time: 167 minutes
- Country: India
- Language: Hindi

Ashanti is a 1982 Hindi-language action-crime film directed by Umesh Mehra. It stars starring Rajesh Khanna, Mithun Chakraborty, Zeenat Aman, Parveen Babi, Shabana Azmi, Kanwaljeet Singh and Amrish Puri.

== Cast ==
- Rajesh Khanna as Inspector Kumar Chandra Singh
- Mithun Chakraborty as Shankar Dada
- Zeenat Aman as Sonia
- Parveen Babi as Sunita
- Shabana Azmi as Kamini
- Kanwaljeet Singh as Tony
- Aruna Irani as Seema, Tony's girlfriend
- Jeevan as Malik
- Amrish Puri as Raja Bheesham Bahadur Singh
- Mohan Choti as Mohan
- Mac Mohan as Durjan
- Padma Chavan as Kumar's mother
- Prem Krishen as Ashok (Sunita's brother)
- Avtar Gill as Raghu
- Narendra Nath as Sampat
- Viju Khote as Francis
- Nadira as Ashram Principal
- Satyen Kappu as Police Commissioner
- Ramesh Deo as Inspector Mahesh
- Bob Christo as Sampat's man

== Soundtrack ==
Song	Singer
"Na Tujhse, Na Mujhse"	Kishore Kumar, Shailendra Singh, Asha Bhosle
"Shakti De Maa"	Chandrashekhar Gadgil
"Silsila Yeh Karwaan Kaa"	Shailendra Singh,Alka Yagnik
"Main Hoon"	Shailendra Singh
"Lawangi Mirchi"	Asha Bhosle, Lata Mangeshkar
"Dil Diya Hai"	Asha Bhosle, Amit Kumar
