= Bees Saal Pehle =

- Directed by: Probir Roy
- Starring: Vinod Mehra; Lalita Pawar
- Music by: Hemant Kumar; S.H. Bihari (lyrics)
- Release date: 1972
- Country: India
- Language: Hindi

Bees Saal Pehle is a 1972 Bollywood horror drama film directed by Probir Roy and produced by Hemant Kumar. The film stars Vinod Mehra, Lalita Pawar and Farida Jalal in lead roles.

== Cast ==
- Vinod Mehra
- Sarita Joshi
- Anupama as Mrs. Geeta Anand
- Farida Jalal as Radha (Anand's Friend)
- Ratan Gaurang as Anand's Friend
- Abhi Bhattacharya as Chaudhary Saab
- Ramesh Deo as Dilip
- Jagdev Bhambri as Dilip's Friend
- Iftekhar as Laxman
- Sarita Khatau as Mrs. Madhu Laxman
- Kanwarjeet Paintal as Anand's Friend (as Paintal)
- Lalita Pawar as Radha's Aunty
- Saul George as Jr Artist
- Mohan Choti
- Gautam Mukherjee
- Padma Khanna as Zarin

== Music ==
- "Abhi To Dua Deke Bachpan Gaya Hai" (Asha Bhosle, Kishore Kumar)
- "Geet in Hothon Par Mere Aane Ko To Aa Hi Gaye" (Lata Mangeshkar)
- "Hai Re Yeh Pyaar Ki Majboori Aur Bebasi" (Lata Mangeshkar)
- "Hai Zamaana Mere Dil Pyaar Ka" (Kishore Kumar)
- "Jab Tak Yeh Raat Hai Baaki Teri Meri Baat Hai Baaki" (Ranu Mukherjee)
- "Kehte Hain Saare Hanste Nazaare Khushiyaan Lutaaye Chala Jaa" (Lata Mangeshkar)
- "Kyon Hai Deewaane Tu Akela Kahaan Gaye Tere Saathi" (Ranu Mukherjee)
- "Poochhe To Kaun Poochhe Yeh Baat Aasmaan Se" (Hemant Kumar)
- Aaj bhi Humara dil ghabraye 1 and 2 ( Lata Mangeshkar)
