= Azad Mohabbat =

- Directed by: Batra Kaushalraj
- Written by: Asad Bhopali
- Produced by: Sarvjeet Singh Paul
- Starring: Yogeeta Bali and Kiran Kumar
- Release date: 1974
- Country: India
- Language: Hindi

Azad Mohabbat is a 1974 Bollywood drama film directed by Batra Kaushalraj. The film stars Yogeeta Bali and Kiran Kumar. The film was produced by Sarvjeet who also acted in the movie. It is a thriller with love story angle and the plot revolves around the character Mohan Oberoi.

== Soundtrack ==
Lyrics: Asad Bhopali

1. "Aankhon Ne Muhabbat Mein Bada Kaam Kiya Hai" – Mahendra Kapoor
2. "Dil Hai Dard-E-Muhabbat Ka Maara Bechaara" – Lata Mangeshkar
3. "Hum Kashmakash-E-Gham Se Guzar Kyon Nahi Jaate" – Lata Mangeshkar
4. "Kabhi Ek Nazar Idhar Bhi Aapki Ho Jaaye" – Asha Bhosle
