= Ek Chitthi Pyar Bhari =

- Ek Chitthi Pyar Bhari Film Poster
- Directed by: Vijay Sadanah
- Produced by: Savitri; Mrs. Raj Goel
- Starring: Raj Babbar; Reena Roy
- Cinematography: Keki Mistry
- Music by: Kalyanji-Anandji
- Release date: 1985
- Running time: 139 minutes
- Country: India
- Language: Hindi

Ek Chitthi Pyar Bhari is a 1985 Hindi drama film, starring Raj Babbar and Reena Roy and directed by Vijay Sadanah.

== Plot ==
Dr. Sunil Sharma runs two clinics in rural India mainly for the benefit of poor and needy people. He advertises in the newspapers for a qualified nurse, who must be single, and be willing to work long hours. A young and attractive woman named Aarti Saxena responds to his advertisement, is successful in the interview, and gets hired. Sunil finds himself getting attracted to Aarti, and mentions about her to his mother. His mother visits the clinic and approves of Aarti. She would like Aarti and Sunil to marry as quickly as possible. What Sunil and his mother do not know that Aarti has a sordid past – she has been disbarred from the nursing profession; she is married, and has a child by the name of Bulbul; and had assaulted a patient named Kamal Nath, when he expressed dissatisfaction with her work. Will Aarti be honest enough to tell Sunil about her past – or will she just refuse to marry him.

== Cast ==
- Raj Babbar as Dr. Sunil Sharma
- Reena Roy as Aarti Saxena
- Sulochana Latkar as Mrs. Sharma
- Chaman Puri as Aarti's Father-in-law
- Lalita Kumari as Aarti's Mother-in-law
- Baby Bulbul as Bulbul
- Raviraaj as Chandmama, in Bulbul dream
- Manmohan Krishna as Milkman
- Dhumal as Sadhuram
- Jayshree T as Sadhuram's daughter
- Jagdeep as Murugan
- C. S. Dubey as Bhiku
- Seema Deo as Hostel Manager
- Ramesh Deo as Kamalnath
- Birbal as Kanha
- Yunus Parvez as Khan Pathan
- Mohan Choti as Traffic Police Constable

== Songs ==
Lyricist: Indeevar, Verma Malik

1. "Yeh Hamari Tumari Khaani, Is Khaani Me Na Raaja Rani" – Asha Bhosle
2. "Shadi Karke Bhi Mai Hu Kawaanra" – Sadhana Sargam, Suresh Wadkar
3. "O Tune Di Aawaaz" – Asha Bhosle, Manhar Udhas
4. "Ek Chitthi Pyaar Bhari" – Mahendra Kapoor
5. "Ek Nanhi Si Ye Gudiya" – Mahendra Kapoor
6. "Ek Nanhi Si Ye Gudiya" (sad) – Mahendra Kapoor
