= Dhoti Lota Aur Chowpatty =

- Poster
- Directed by: Mohan Choti
- Written by: Jagdish Mukherjee
- Starring: Nazir Hussain
- Release date: 1975
- Running time: 139 Min
- Country: India
- Language: Hindi

Dhoti Lota Aur Chowpatty is a 1975 Bollywood comedy film directed by Mohan Choti and noted for its large cast and guest appearances. The film was released under the banner of Mohan Choti Production.

== Cast ==
- Mohan Choti as Mohan Choti
- Dharmendra as Madman
- Dulari as Mohan's mom
- Helen as Madame
- Nazir Hussain as Girdharilal Paniwala
- Jagdeep as Film hero
- Farida Jalal as Rajni
- Sanjeev Kumar as Inspector Wagle
- Mehmood as Plainclothes policeman
- Shubha Khote as Girdharilal's sister
- Ranjeet as Ranjeet
- Tun Tun as Film heroine's mom
- Bindu as dancer
- Yunus Parvez as Havaldar Naik
- Jankidas
- Jeevan
- Satyendra Kapoor
- Roopesh Kumar
- Mac Mohan
- Keshto Mukherjee
- Prem Nath as Imandar Pauwala
- Vijay Bhayana as Gang member at Bus Stop
- Rajendra Nath
- Neena
- Joginder Shelly
- Nilu Phule
- Om Prakash
- Laxmi Chhaya

== Soundtrack ==
Dhoti Lota Aur Chowpatty

Soundtrack album by Shyamji Ghanshyamji
- Released: 1975
- Recorded: 1975
- Genre: Soundtrack
- Length: 20:16
- Label: Saregama
- Producer: Shyamji Ghanshyamji

Music was composed by Shyamji Ghanshyamji.

Track List
No.	Title	Lyrics	Singer(s)	Length
1.	"Aaj Jagat Me Raambaan Hai"	Kulwant Jani	Nitin Mukesh, Mohammed Rafi, Mohan Choti	3:30
2.	"Are Aaina Bhi Tera Upe Shaidan Ho Gaya Hai"	Hasrat Jaipuri	Preeti Sagar, Mohammed Rafi	6:28
3.	"Dhoti Lota Aur Chopati"	Hasrat Jaipuri	Mukesh	2:59
4.	"Sau Baar Ki Tauba"	Hasrat Jaipuri	Usha Mangeshkar	3:08
5.	"Thumak Thumak Chale Chaal Aankh Me Kajal Ki Dori"	Gulshan Bawra	Mohammed Rafi, Usha Mangeshkar	4:11
Total length:				20:16
