= Bombay by Nite =

- Directed by: A. Shamsheer
- Produced by: Upendra Jha
- Starring: Ramesh Deo; Prithviraj Kapoor; Kum Kum; Sanjeev Kumar
- Music by: Iqbal Qureshi
- Release date: 29 December 1979
- Country: India
- Language: Hindi

Bombay by Nite is a 1979 Bollywood film directed by A. Shamsheer. The film stars Ramesh Deo, Prithviraj Kapoor and Sanjeev Kumar .

== Cast ==
- Sanjeev Kumar
- Kum Kum
- Ramesh Deo
- Asit Sen
- Prithviraj Kapoor
- Bela Bose
- Mohan Choti
- Lata Sinha
- Heera Sawant
- Johnny Whisky
- Ridki

== Soundtrack ==
Music Director : Iqbal Qureshi, Lyricist : Upendra

Track listing:

1. "Dheere Dheere" – Kishore Kumar & Sulakshana Pandit
2. "Husn-E-Baharan Tauba" – Sharda & Chorus
3. "Baharon Ne Kiye Sajde" – Mukesh
4. "Khubsurat Badan" – Mahendra Kapoor, Krishna Kalle, Sharda & Chorus
5. "Yeh Shaam Behakti Shaam" – Krishna Kalle
6. "Kaun Si Manzil Pe" – Suman Kalyanpur
