= Laagi Nahi Chhute Ram =

- Directed by: Kundan Kumar
- Produced by: R. Tiwari
- Starring: Kumkum; Ashim Kumar
- Cinematography: R. K. Pandit
- Edited by: Kamlakar Karhanis
- Music by: Chitragupta
- Release date: 1963
- Country: India
- Language: Bhojpuri

Laagi Nahi Chhute Rama (Transl.: Love Never Goes Away) is a 1963 Bhojpuri film, directed by Kundan Kumar and produced by R. Tiwari. This was third Bhojpuri film after Ganga Maiyya Tohe Piyari Chadhaibo and Bidesiya. The film stars Kumkum and Ashim Kumar in the lead roles.

== Plot summary ==
Chanda (played by Kumkum), a dancer, arrives at Bihta railway station. She gets into a dispute with a ticket collector and a tangewallah over an exorbitant fare. The hero, Suraj (played by Ashim Kumar), the son of a priest, intervenes and gives her a free ride. He sees her dance at a nautanki and falls in love with her.

However, Suraj is not her only suitor. A wealthy and lecherous thakur is also captivated by her. The thakur's underling, Firangiya (played by Anwar Hussain), gets Chanda's uncle drunk and kidnaps her. Suraj comes to save her, chasing down the horse carriage and beating up Firangiya. This act solidifies Chanda's love for him.

The conflict arises from the social disparity between Chanda and Surah. Suraj's father is enraged at the prospect of his son marrying a dancing girl, deeming it unacceptable for a respected family. The remainder of the film follows the couple as they navigate numerous challenges and plot twists, ultimately leading to the priest overcoming his class prejudices and the lovers reuniting.

== Cast ==
- Kumkum
- Ashim Kumar
- Indrani Mukherjee
- Anwar Hussain
- Helen
- Leela Mishra

== Soundtrack ==
The music was composed by Chitragupt and lyrics penned by Majrooh Sultanpuri.

Title	Singer(s)
"Mori Kalaiya"	Lata Mangeshkar
"Rakhiya Bandhala Bhaiya"	Lata Mangeshkar
"Banwaro Ho"	Suman Kalyanpur
"Saj Ke To Gaili Rama"	Suman Kalyanpur
"Lal Lal Hothwa Se"	Lata Mangeshkar, Talat Mahmood
"Lagi Naahi Chhute Rama"	Lata Mangeshkar, Talat Mahmood
"Munhwase Bola" (Parts 1 and 2)	Asha Bhosle, Manna Dey

== Theme ==
The central theme of the movie is the conflict between social classes, embodied by the love story between an upper caste priest's son and a lower caste dancer. The narrative opposes the prejudices held by the upper class against performers and those from lower social standings. The core of the film is a love story, challenging the societal norms of the time that dictated individuals should marry within their own social strata.

The film also depicts of rural life in central Bihar during the 1960s. This includes shots of tongas, cattle-fairs, a cow suckling its calf, goats in the fields, potters at their wheels, and farmers
