= Apna Banake Dekho =

1962 film

- Starring: Manoj Kumar, Asha Parekh, Nazir Hussain, Sunder, etc.
- Music by: Ravi
- Release date: 1962
- Country: India
- Language: Hindi

Apna Banake Dekho is a 1962 Hindi film starring Manoj Kumar, Asha Parekh, Nazir Hussain, Sunder etc.

== Soundtrack ==
Music was conducted by Ravi and lyrics were by S. H. Bihari & Asad Bhopali.

#	Song	Singer
1	"Raaz-E-Dil Unse Chhupaya Na Gaya"	Mohammed Rafi
2	"Hum To Pehle Hi Nazar Mein"	Mohammed Rafi
3	"Hum Pyar Tumhe Karte Hain"	Mohammed Rafi, Asha Bhosle
4	"Tere Sadke Mila De Mera Yaar"	Mohammed Rafi, Asha Bhosle
5	"Kachchi Dagar Panghat Ki"	Asha Bhosle
6	"Mile Hai Aap Jab Se"	Asha Bhosle
7	"Chahat Ka Deewana"	Asha Bhosle

== Reception ==
Leading lady Asha Parekh wrote in her 2017 "The Hit Girl": "Apna Banake Dekho did not do well, perhaps because it wasn't particularly well made."
