= Gunah Aur Kanoon =

- Directed by: B. R. Ishara
- Written by: unknown
- Produced by: K. L. Bhatia; Johnny Whisky
- Starring: Prithviraj Kapoor; Sanjeev Kumar; Kumkum
- Music by: Sapan Jagmohan
- Release date: 1970
- Running time: 180 minutes
- Country: India
- Language: Hindi

Gunah Aur Kanoon is a 1970 Indian Hindi language crime drama film directed by B. R. Ishara. The film stars Sanjeev Kumar and Prithviraj Kapoor.

== Cast ==
- Prithviraj Kapoor as Jamnadas
- Sanjeev Kumar as Rakesh
- Kumkum as Poonam
- Sailesh Kumar as Shailesh
- Tarun Bose
- Mohan Choti
- P. Jairaj
- Mohan Sherry

== Soundtrack ==
No.	Title	Singer(s)	Length
1.	"Aisa To Kabhi Mumkin Hi Nahi ki"	Mohammed Rafi	5:56
2.	"Ab To Jane Do Saiya Mulaqat Ho Gayi aaj"	Asha Bhosle	4:57
3.	"Ek Ek Pal Ro Ro Beete sajna"	Asha Bhosle	4:25
4.	"Hans Do To Mohabbat Ho Tumse"	Mohammed Rafi	5:18
5.	"Kisne Mujhe Chauka Diya re"	Asha Bhosle	6:05
