= Pyaara Dushman (1955 film) =

- Starring: Nadira; Sulochana; Kumkum
- Music by: Nisar Bazmi
- Release date: 1955

Pyaara Dushman is a 1955 Bollywood film.

== Soundtrack ==
1. "Aa Tujhko Bulaye Ye Pyasi Nigahe" - Asha Bhosle, Mohammed Rafi
2. "Ye Duniya Hai Aani Jani" - Asha Bhosle, Mohammed Rafi
3. "Ye Duniya Hai Aani Jani" - Asha Bhosle, Mohammed Rafi
4. "Mehanga Ho Ya Sasta Ho Par Sauda Kar Lo Pyar Ka" - Mohammed Rafi
5. "Dil Le Ke Dil Ki Duniya Mita Di" - Asha Bhosle
6. "Jine Wale Tu Agar Marne Se Darta" - Mohammed Rafi
7. "Pyaar Kiya Nahi Jata Ho Jata Hai" - Mohammed Rafi, Asha Bhosle
