= Lalkar =

- Directed by: Ramanand Sagar
- Written by: Ramanand Sagar; Moti Sagar
- Produced by: Ramanand Sagar
- Starring: Dharmendra; Rajendra Kumar; Mala Sinha; Kumkum; Nazir Hussain
- Music by: Kalyanji-Anandji
- Distributed by: Sagar Arts
- Release date: 2 June 1972
- Country: India
- Language: Hindi

Lalkar (Challenge) is a 1972 Indian Hindi-language war action film produced and directed by Ramanand Sagar. It was adapted from a Hindi novel Sagar had written, called "Lalkar". The film had music composed by Kalyanji Anandji and the lyricists were Hasrat Jaipuri, Indeevar, Mahendra Dehlvi and Kulwant Jani. It was rated as a hit and cited as one of the "highest grossers" of 1972. Stated to be the costliest war film produced at the time, it starred Dharmendra, Rajendra Kumar, Mala Sinha and Kumkum in lead roles. The rest of the cast included Nazir Hussain, Sujit Kumar, Ramesh Deo, Dara Singh and Agha.

== Plot ==
Two sons of Colonel Kapoor, one in the Army and One in the Air force are in love with the same girl. But before anything could be finalized, both are sent to a mission against the Japanese to destroy their secret airport.

== Cast ==
- Dharmendra as Major Ram Kapoor
- Rajendra Kumar as Wing Commander Rajan Kapoor
- Mala Sinha as Usha Choudhury
- Kumkum as Rajkumari Toshi
- Dev Kumar as Captain Dev
- Nana Palsikar as Colonel Kapoor
- Nazir Hussain as Colonel Choudhury
- Tun Tun as Danko
- Keshto Mukherjee as Keshto
- Sujit Kumar
- Agha
- Roopesh Kumar
- Manmohan as Japanese Army Officer
- Ramesh Deo
- Dara Singh
- Ajit singh deol

== Soundtrack ==
#	Title	Singer(s)
1	"Aaj Gaalo Mushkralo"	Mohammed Rafi
2	"Bol Mere Sathiya"	Mohammed Rafi, Lata Mangeshkar
3	"Mere Mehboob"	Manhar Udhas, Mala Sinha
4	"Shyamji Ke Dwaar Pe"	Mahendra Kapoor, Poornima
5	"Zara Mudke To Dekh"	Mohammed Rafi
6	"Aaj Gaalo Muskuralo(Sad)"	Mohammed Rafi
7	"Maine Kaha Na Na Na"	Asha Bhosle
