= Tu Nahin Aur Sahi =

- Directed by: Brij
- Starring: Pradeep Kumar; Kumkum
- Music by: Ravi
- Release date: 1960
- Country: India
- Language: Hindi

Tu Nahin Aur Sahi is a 1960 Hindi-language film directed by Brij. It stars Pradeep Kumar, Kumkum in lead roles with music by Ravi.

== Cast ==
- Pradeep Kumar as Ratan
- Kumkum as Geeta
- Nishi as Bimla
- Minoo Mumtaz as Rita
- Helen
- Murad
- Kundan
- Tun Tun

== Music ==
Music of the film was composed by Ravi and the songs were written by Majrooh Sultanpuri, Asad Bhopali and Shakeel Numani.

Song	Singer
"Tu Nahin Aur Sahi"	Mukesh
"Seedhe Saade Insanon Ka"	Mohammed Rafi
"Yeh Rangbhare Badal, Yeh Udta Hua Aanchal Kehta Hai"	Mohammed Rafi, Asha Bhosle
"Dekhiye Huzoor, Mujhse Rehke Door Door, Kheliye Na"	Mohammed Rafi, Asha Bhosle
"Meri Mehfil Mein Aake Dekh Le, Zara Aankhen Milake"	Mohammed Rafi, Asha Bhosle
"Deewana Hoon Main Pyar Ka, Sama Hai Ikraar Ka"	Mohammed Rafi, Asha Bhosle
"Man Hi Man Muskaye Re"	Asha Bhosle
