= Dharma (1973 film) =

- Directed by: Chand
- Written by: Ehsan Rizvi
- Screenplay by: K. B. Pathak
- Story by: Chand
- Produced by: S. K. Kapur
- Starring: Pran; Navin Nischol; Rekha; Ajit; Madan Puri; Bindu
- Cinematography: B. Gupta
- Music by: Sonik Omi
- Production company: Kapur Films
- Distributed by: Kapur Films
- Release date: 30 November 1973
- Running time: 138 mins
- Country: India
- Language: Hindi

Dharma is a 1973 Bollywood action film directed by Chand. The film stars Pran in the title role. The rest of the cast includes Ajit, Madan Puri, Bindu and the pair Navin Nischol and Rekha. The film became a "Superhit" at the box office. It was remade into the Telugu film Na Pere Bhagavan (1976).

== Plot ==
Sevak Singh Dharma is a dreaded dacoit living in isolation with his followers Bhairav Singh (Rajan Haksar), Mangal Singh (Madan Puri) and his wife Parvati (Geeta Siddharth) amongst others. He kills Bhairav for betraying his trust during a police encounter. While escaping in a boat, both his young son, Suraj, and wife are hit by gunfire by inspector Ajit Singh (Ajit) and considered drowned, while he survives and lands up in a city as the feared dacoit, Chandan Singh. Chandan Singh takes revenge on Ajit Singh's family and abducts his wife Asha and daughter Radha (both played by Rekha). Asha gets killed accidentally while Radha is rescued by a prostitute. Flash forward: Ajit Singh is now the Inspector General of Police; Chandan Singh is impersonating Nawab Sikander Bakht. Radha is a dancer who flips for Raju (Navin Nischol) Chandan's second-in-command. In time, Chandan tells Ajit that she is his daughter, and he should take charge of her. Even though Ajit suspects Raju's true identity, he admits him into the police force with the explicit duty of arresting Chandan who, after the truth about him comes in the open, is on the run. Bottles of blood and bullets run amuck in sequences leading towards the climax; the truth about Raju (or Suraj), now a police inspector, is revealed in the encounter between father and son. Chandan gives himself up to the police.

== Cast ==
- Pran as Sevak Singh / Dharam Singh "Dharma" / Chandan Seth / Nawab Sikandar Mirza
- Navin Nischol as Suraj / Raju
- Rekha as Asha Singh / Radha (Double Role)
- Ajit as Inspector Ajit Singh
- Madan Puri as Mangal Singh
- Rajan Haksar as Bhairav Singh
- Ramesh Deo as Chaman Singh
- Mohan Choti as Car Mechanic
- Asit Sen as Seth Garibdas
- Anjali Kadam as Parvati Singh
- Chandrashekhar
- Murad as Seth
- Bindu as Bindiya
- Helen as Cabaret Dancer #1
- Faryal (actress) as Cabaret Dancer #2
- Sonia Sahni as Cabaret Dancer #3
- Jayshree T. as Cabaret Dancer #4

== Crew ==
- Stunt - A. Gani
- Art - D. S. Malvankar
- Choreography - Surya Kumar
- Audiography - Harbans Singh

== Soundtrack ==
Lyrics written by Verma Malik and music composed by Sonik Omi.

Song	Singer
"Sada Itni Umar Teri Rahe"	Mohammed Rafi
"Main Teri Gunahgar Hoon, Main Tujhse Sharmsar Hoon"	Mohammed Rafi, Asha Bhosle
"Raaz Ki Baat Keh Doon To Jane Mehfil Mein Phir"	Mohammed Rafi, Asha Bhosle
"Jo Kal Ki Hai Bachi Baaten"	Asha Bhosle, Omi
