= Nadira (Indian actress) =

Indian actress (1932–2006)

- Nadira in Garma Garam (1957)
- Born: Florence Ezekiel/ Farhat Ezekiel; 5 December 1932; Baghdad, Kingdom of Iraq (present-day Iraq)
- Died: 9 February 2006 (aged 73); Mumbai, Maharashtra, India
- Occupation: Actress
- Years active: 1952–2001
- Spouse: Nakhshab Jarchavi (annulled)
- Awards: Filmfare Award in 1976

Nadira (born Florence Ezekiel, alternatively named Farhat Ezekiel; 5 December 1932 – 9 February 2006), was an Iraqi-born Indian actress who worked in the Hindi film industry. One of the leading and highest paid actresses of the early 1950s, she later transitioned into supporting roles where Nadira often portrayed modern, rebellious women in a range of films.

She appeared in films from the 1950s and 1960s, including Aan (1952), Shree 420 (1955), Pakeezah (1972), and Julie (1975), which won her the Filmfare Best Supporting Actress Award.

== Early life ==
Nadira was born on 5 December 1932 in Baghdad, Iraq, into a Baghdadi Jewish family. When she was an infant, her family migrated from Baghdad to Bombay in search of business opportunities. She had two brothers, one of whom lives in the United States and another in Israel.

== Career ==
Nadira's first appearance in cinema was in the 1943 Hindi-language film Mauj when she was 10 or 11 years of age.

Her breakthrough came from Sardar Akhtar, wife of film director Mehboob Khan who cast her in the film Aan (1952). Her role as a Rajput princess in the film marked her rise to cinematic prominence. In 1955, she played a rich socialite named Maya in Shree 420. She played pivotal roles in a number of films such as Dil Apna Aur Preet Parai (1960), Pakeezah (1972), Hanste Zakhm (1973), and Amar Akbar Anthony (1977). She was often cast as a temptress or vamp, roles which were used as a foil to the chaste leading lady characters that were favoured at the time by the Hindi film industry.

Nadira won a Filmfare Award for Best Supporting Actress, for her role in the 1975 film Julie. During the 1980s and 1990s, she mostly played supporting characters. Due to her image as a Westernized woman, she often played roles of Christian or Anglo-Indian ladies. Her last role was in the film Josh (2000).

She was among the highest-paid actresses during her career, and was one of the first Indian actresses to own a Rolls-Royce.

== Personal life ==
Following her breakthrough success with Aan (1952), filmmaker and lyricist Nakhshab Jarchavi (12 July 1918 – 24 August 1967) manipulated Nadira into breaking her contract with prominent filmmaker Mehboob Khan who produced and directed Aan with the ulterior motive of moving himself further. Nadira and Nakshab got married soon and the latter used her earnings and star power to fund his own then upcoming films starring her, namely Nagma (1953) and Raftar (1955). However, both these films failed to do well. Moreover, Nakhshab was licentious, being involved with multiple women. The breaking point of their marriage occurred when he boldly brought another woman into their shared household. Disgusted by his actions, Nadira immediately left him and their house, annuelling their marriage, leaving behind her earnings and possessions. She subsequently moved into a rented suite on Marine Drive, Mumbai (then Bombay) to rebuild her career and life independently.

In her later years, Nadira lived alone in Mumbai, India, as many of her relatives had moved to Israel. In the last three years before her death, she had been residing in her condominium with only a housekeeper. On 24 January 2006, she suffered a cardiac arrest and was admitted to a hospital in a semi-comatose state. She had multiple existing health problems, including tubercular meningitis, alcoholic liver disorder, and paralysis.

She died on 9 February 2006, aged 73, at the Bhatia Hospital in Tardeo, Mumbai, following a prolonged illness.

== Filmography ==
=== Films ===
Year	Title	Role	Notes
1943	Mauj		Child artist; uncredited
1952	Aan	Rajshree	First adult role
1953	Akash		
1953	Nagma		Produced, directed & lyrics written by ex-husband Nakhshab Jarchavi.
1954	Dak Babu		
1954	Waris	Kanta	
1955	Pyaara Dushman		
1955	Raftar		Produced, directed & lyrics written by ex-husband Nakhshab Jarchavi.
1955	Shri 420	Maya	
1956	Beloved Corinna		
1956	Talwar Ka Dhani		
1956	Pocket Maar	Rita	
1956	Samundari Daku		
1956	Sipahsalar		
1957	Garma Garam		
1958	Daughter Of Sindbad	Shabnam	
1958	Pehla Pehla Pyar		
1958	Police	Champakali	
1960	Black Tiger		
1960	Dil Apna Aur Preet Parai	Mrs. Kusum Verma	
1961	Main Aur Mera Bhai		
1961	Wazir-E-Azam		
1962	Gyara Hazar Ladkian	Mohana	
1962	Madam Zorro		
1963	Meri Surat Teri Ankhen		
1965	Chhoti Chhoti Baten	Shanta	
1965	Accident		
1965	Mehbooba		
1966	Hum Kahan Ja Rahe Hain		
1967	C.I.D. 909		
1968	Jung Aur Aman		
1968	Kahin Din Kahin Raat	Indrani	
1968	Sapno Ka Saudagar	Ranjana's mother	
1969	Insaaf Ka Mandir		
1969	Talash	Flirtatious lady in red sari	
1969	The Guru	Courtesan	
1970	Bombay Talkie	Anjana	
1970	Chetna	Nirmala	
1970	Ek Nanhi Munni Ladki Thi		
1970	Ishq Par Zor Nahin	Mrs. Doraiswamy	
1970	Jahan Pyar Miley		
1970	Safar	Shekhar Kapoor's mother	
1971	Kahin Aar Kahin Paar		
1972	Anokha Daan		
1972	Ek Nazar	Ameena Bai	
1972	Pakeezah	Gauhar Jaan	
1972	Raja Jani	Shanno's foster mother	
1973	Ek Nari Do Roop		
1973	Hanste Zakhm	Brothel Madame	
1973	Pyaar Ka Rishta		
1974	Faslah	Mrs. Sonachand	
1974	Ishk Ishk Ishk		
1974	Woh Main Nahin	Gangu Tai Ghotale	
1975	Dharmatma	Gypsy woman	
1975	Julie	Margaret 'Maggie' (Julie's Mom)	Won Filmfare Award for Best Supporting Actress in 1976
1975	Kahtey Hain Mujhko Raja	Thakurain	
1975	Mere Sartaj	Gulshan Bai	
1976	Bhanwar	Sharada	
1977	Aap Ki Khatir	Shanti	
1977	Aashiq Hoon Baharon Ka	Heera	
1977	Amar Akbar Anthony	Lakshmi's stepmother	Uncredited cameo
1977	Darling Darling	Mrs. Rai Bahadur	
1977	Paapi	Old lady who got stuck by Vikram's car	
1978	Naukri	Lilly	
1979	Bin Phere Hum Tere	Talen Bai	
1979	Duniya Meri Jeb Mein	Mrs. Robins	
1979	Magroor	Mrs. D'Sa	
1980	Chaal Baaz		
1980	Swayamvar	Durga Bhargav	
1981	Aas Paas	Rani	
1981	Dahshat	Mrs. Vishal	
1982	Ashanti	School principal	
1982	Raaste Pyar Ke	Saraswati	
1985	Saagar	Miss Joseph	
1991	Jhoothi Shaan	Ranimaa	
1997	Tamanna	Nazneen Begum	
1999	Cotton Mary	Mattie	
2000	Josh	Mrs. Louise	Last release

=== Television ===
Year	Title	Role
1984	Kim (TV serial)	Kulu's widow
1995	Ek Tha Rusty (Season 1)	Ms. McKenzie
1995	Thoda Sa Aasman	Mrs. Joshi
1997	Margarita	Nacha
2001	Zohra Mahal	Zohra Mahal

== See also ==
- List of Indian Jews
