= Kasauti =

- Poster
- Directed by: Arabind Sen
- Written by: Satish Bhatnagar; Suhrid Kar
- Produced by: Arabind Sen
- Starring: Amitabh Bachchan; Hema Malini; Pran
- Cinematography: Aloke Das Gupta
- Edited by: D.N. Pai
- Music by: Kalyanji-Anandji
- Release date: 9 August 1974
- Running time: 131 minutes
- Country: India
- Language: Hindi

Kasauti (lit. 'Criterion') is a 1974 Bollywood drama film directed and produced by Arabind Sen. It stars Amitabh Bachchan, Hema Malini, Pran in lead roles.

== Synopsis ==
Sapna, a slum dweller of Bombay seeks refuge from a drunken outburst of her stepfather. Heera, a playboy smuggler, has an eye on Sapna and wants to have her for his pleasure. Amit, an educated taxi driver saves Sapna from the clutches of Heera but soon she is accused of attempting robbery and sent to prison. In a fit of anger, Sapna's mother kills Sapna's stepfather.

Amit promises to marry Sapna on her acquittal but on the eve of their marriage Amit's father refuses to accept Sapna. Not wanting to break up Amit's family Sapna decides to walk out of his life and leaves the city.

Amit and his friend Pyarelal search for Sapna but do not succeed. In Calcutta, Sapna becomes an instant hit on the stage through Ashok Babu. One day, Ashok proposes to her and Sapna again leaves. Eventually, she is reunited with Amit.

== Cast ==
- Amitabh Bachchan as Amitabh Sharma "Amit"
- Hema Malini as Sapna
- Pran as Pyarelal
- Sonia Sahni as Neeta
- Bharat Bhushan as Neeta's Husband
- Mac Mohan as Rajesh
- Ramesh Deo as Heera
- Abhi Bhattacharya as Shankar
- D. K. Sapru as Hariram
- Murad as Amit's Father
- Sulochana Latkar as Sapna's Mother
- Satyen Kappu as Sapna's step Father
- Bipin Gupta as Inspector
- Ram Sethi as Balu
- Mohan Choti as Panchu

== Soundtrack ==
The music was composed by Kalyanji-Anandji, lyrics by Indeevar, Verma Malik and Anand Bakshi.

Song	Singer
"Rangmanch Yeh Duniya Sari"	Lata Mangeshkar
"Ho Jata Hai Pyar, Pyar Kiya Nahin Jaye"	Lata Mangeshkar, Kishore Kumar
"Hum Bolega To Bologe"	Kishore Kumar
"Baby Ho Gayi Hai Jawan, Nachegi Jhoomegi Gayegi"	Mahendra Kapoor, Asha Bhosle
"Saat Mare Aur Satra Ghayal"	Asha Bhosle
"Yeh Time Time Ki Baat"	Asha Bhosle
