= Shreeman Funtoosh =

- Directed by: Shantilal Soni
- Produced by: S. Bhagat
- Starring: Kishore Kumar; Kumkum
- Music by: Laxmikant–Pyarelal
- Release date: 1965
- Country: India
- Language: Hindi

Shreeman Funtoosh is a 1965 Indian Hindi-language science fiction comedy film directed by Shantilal Soni, and starring Kishore Kumar and Kumkum. The film's music was composed by Laxmikant–Pyarelal. Alongside Mr. X in Bombay (1964), the film is considered one of the earliest science fiction films in Bollywood.

== Cast ==
- Kishore Kumar as Kishore / Funtoosh
- Kumkum as Meena Verma
- Anoop Kumar as Ranjan
- Harindranath Chattopadhyay as Mr. Verma, Meena's father
- Ashalata Biswas as Kishore's mother
- Mohan Choti as Chaurangi Chaurasia
- Herman Benjamin (dance choreographer)

== Soundtrack ==
The music of the film was composed by Laxmikant-Pyarelal, while the lyrics were written by Anand Bakshi and Asad Bhopali.

=== Tracklist ===
No.	Title	Lyrics	Singer(s)	Length
1.	""Yeh Dard Bhara Afsana""	Anand Bakshi	Kishore Kumar
2.	""Sultana Sultana Tu Na Ghabrana""	Anand Bakshi	Kishore Kumar, Lata Mangeshkar
3.	""Woh Jharoke Se Jo Jhake""	Asad Bhopali	Kishore Kumar
