= Aakhri Daao =

1975 Indian Hindi film

- Poster
- Directed by: A. Salaam
- Written by: Salim–Javed
- Produced by: M. M. Malhotra
- Starring: Jeetendra; Saira Banu
- Cinematography: Shyam Rao
- Edited by: Prabhakar Supari
- Music by: Laxmikant–Pyarelal
- Production company: Kala Bharathi
- Release date: 1975
- Running time: 145 minutes
- Country: India
- Language: Hindi

Aakhri Daao (transl. Final Trick) is a 1975 Indian Hindi-language crime film, directed by A. Salaam, written by Salim–Javed, and produced by M.M. Malhotra Kala Bharathi. It stars Jeetendra, Saira Banu in lead roles, with Danny Denzongpa, Padma Khanna, Ranjeet in supporting roles and music composed by Laxmikant–Pyarelal. The film is based on Bhagwati Charan Verma's 1950 novel of the same name.

== Plot ==
Ravi is professional safecracker. In one of heists, the owner of the safe is murdered by the cunning duo of Sawan and Julie. Ravi becomes implicated in the murder despite being innocent. He decides to abscond and lands in a remote estate owned by a rich man. He becomes the estate's manager. Reena, the daughter of the estate owner, grows to respect Ravi and eventually they fall in love. Sawan and Julie also arrive at the estate and soon they try to blackmail Ravi into burgling the safe of his employer. They succeed in scaring him into submission and he agrees to pull this one final heist for them. Meanwhile, Reena finds out the truth and lashes out at him for his duplicity. She eventually understands that Ravi is not a bad person at heart. Sawan, sensing Ravi's reluctance, decides to coerce him into cracking the safe by threatening to harm Reena. He eventually betrays his accomplice Julie who confesses to their misdeeds to the police as she lies mortally wounded. Ravi gives chase to Sawan. He manages to subdue him and recover what they had stolen from the estate's safe. Ravi is acquitted of all previous charges and marries Reena.

== Cast ==
- Jeetendra as Ravi
- Saira Banu as Reena
- Danny Denzongpa as Sawan
- Padma Khanna as Julie
- Aruna Irani as Chandana
- Ranjeet as Dilawar Singh
- Ramesh Deo as Inspector Verma
- Iftekhar as Inspector Khurana
- Satyen Kappu as Reena's father
- Mohan Choti as Tannu

== Soundtrack ==
No.	Title	Singer(s)	Length
1.	"Jhuthe Sang Pyar Kiya, Vaade Ka Aitbaar Kiya"	Kishore Kumar, Lata Mangeshkar
2.	"Dekhe Kahan Par tere"	Mohammed Rafi
3.	"Aisa Na Ho ki"	Mohammed Rafi
4.	"Tum Sang Preet Lagai sajna"	Asha Bhosle
