= Haseenon Ka Devata =

- Starring: Sanjay Khan; Rekha; Bindu; Helen
- Music by: Laxmikant–Pyarelal
- Release date: 1971
- Country: India
- Language: Hindi

Haseenon Ka Devata is a 1971 Hindi-language drama film directed by Ravikant Nagaich, produced by Ram Dayal, with music composed by Laxmikant Pyarelal and songs penned by Anand Bakshi. The film stars Sanjay Khan, Rekha, Bindu and Helen.

== Cast ==
- Sanjay Khan ... Jai
- Rekha ... Sunita / Chhabili
- Sujit Kumar ... Gopal
- Bindu ... Silky
- Helen ... Casino Dancer
- Mohan Choti ... Gypsy Chotu
- Bela Bose ... Gypsy Woman
- Kamal Kapoor ... Tony
- Brahm Bharadwaj ... Raja saheb
- Polson ... Gypsy Motu
- Ram Kamlani ... Adv. Mehta
- Ranjeet
- Ram Avtar ... Persian Sheikh
- Tiger Joginder ... Sheikh's bodyguard
- Rirkoo ... Sheikh's dwarf associate
- Coca-Cola ... Police Inspector
- Suraj ... Ram Singh
- Rajan Kapoor ... Tony's associate
- Majnu as Bhola

== Songs ==
Song	Singer
"Haseenon Ka Devata"	Mohammed Rafi
"Gori Ke Aanchal Mein"	Mohammed Rafi
"Balam Deewane Mujhe Chhod De"	Mohammed Rafi, Asha Bhosle
"Jiske Liye Mera Dil Jale"	Asha Bhosle
"Dhadkan Kehti Hai"	Asha Bhosle
"Preet Na Jaane"	Asha Bhosle
