= Raja Aur Runk =

- Directed by: Kotayya Pratyagatma
- Written by: Screenplay: Kotayya Pratyagatma, R.V. Sastri; Dialogue: Mukhram Sharma
- Based on: The Prince and the Pauper by Mark Twain
- Produced by: L. V. Prasad
- Starring: Sanjeev Kumar; Mahesh Kothare; Kumkum
- Cinematography: Ravikant Nagaich
- Edited by: Shivaji Awdhut
- Music by: Laxmikant Pyarelal; Anand Bakshi (lyrics)
- Production company: Prasad Studios
- Release date: 1968
- Country: India
- Language: Hindi

Raja Aur Runk (lit. 'The king and the commoner') is a 1968 Indian Hindi-language film, directed by Kotayya Pratyagatma and starring Sanjeev Kumar and Kumkum.

It is a remake of the 1954 Telugu film Raju Peda, itself based on Mark Twain's 1881 novel, The Prince and the Pauper.

== Plot ==
Long ago, in a great kingdom, two boys were born on the same night. One was Prince Narendradev, swaddled in silk and raised behind palace walls. The other was Raja, born in a crumbling hut to a poor, gentle mother named Shanta, a little sister named Sujjo, and a father, Hariram, whose temper turned to violence more nights than not. Nothing about their lives touched — except their faces, which were so alike they might have been the same child born twice.

Years passed. The prince grew restless behind the palace's endless rules and ceremonies, aching for a taste of ordinary freedom. Raja, meanwhile, grew weary of his father's fists. One night he simply ran, stumbling half-blind through the dark until he found himself, of all places, inside the royal gardens.

The guards seized him roughly, mistaking him for a thief — until the prince himself stepped out and called them off. He led the ragged boy to his chambers, and there, face to face, both boys froze. It was like looking into a mirror.

Friendship came quickly after that. The prince wanted to hear about the streets, about running wild and answering to no one; Raja wanted to touch the silk, taste the strange rich food, feel what it was like to matter. On a whim — just to see — they traded clothes.

It was a boy's game. It cost them everything. The guards found the prince in Raja's rags and, seeing only a beggar, threw him out the gates before he could say a word.

Outside, the real prince shouted the truth to anyone who'd listen — that he was the heir, that a mistake had been made — and no one believed him. His own father beat him harder for it, certain the boy had gone mad with excuses. But Shanta, his mother, only saw a child in pain. She held him, sang to him, loved him without asking why. It was the first time in his life anyone had loved him for nothing at all.

Inside the palace, Raja was drowning in fear. He told the ministers again and again that he was no prince, just a frightened boy who didn't belong — but they only saw a young lord shaken by grief, for the old King had just died, and the crown was already turning toward him.

It was Commander Vikram who worked out the truth. He kept it to himself — a secret worth more than loyalty. If both boys disappeared, the throne would have no true heir left to challenge him. He began planning their deaths.

But fate intervened. A warrior named Sudhir found the real prince wandering, wounded and half-starved, in the wilderness beyond the city. One look told him everything. He swore to protect the boy and began the long, dangerous journey back.

They arrived on the day of the coronation. Raja stood before the throne, hands shaking, the crown already rising toward his head, Vikram watching with quiet satisfaction — when the doors burst open, and the real prince walked in beside Sudhir.

The court fell silent. Two identical faces stared back at everyone in the room. Before anyone could speak, Sudhir laid Vikram's treachery bare, and the guards seized the commander before he could so much as reach for his sword.

Narendradev took his rightful place on the throne at last. But he never forgot the hut, the beatings, or the mother who had sung to a stranger's son as if he were her own. He brought Shanta, Raja, and Sujjo to live within the palace walls — and made certain that family would never know hunger, fear, or cruelty again.

== Cast ==
- Sanjeev Kumar as Sudhir/Vijay
- Kumkum as Rajnartaki Madhvi
- Ajit as Hariram Haria
- Mukri as Sunder (Sudhir's friend)
- Mohan Choti as Gangu (Hariram's friend)
- Kamal Kapoor as Senapati Vikram
- Mahesh Kothare as Yuvraaj Narendradev/Raja (as Master Mahesh)
- Nirupa Roy as Shanta
- Nazima as Sujata Sujjo
- Aruna Rai as Chanchala (Madhvi's friend)
- Bipin Gupta as Maharaj
- Badri Prasad as Guru Shivanand

== Soundtrack ==
The film's music was composed by Laxmikant Pyarelal with lyrics by Anand Bakshi.

- "Mera Naam Hai Chameli", Lata Mangeshkar
- "Mere Raja Mere Lal", Asha Bhosle & Usha Mangeshkar
- "Kanhaiya Kanhaiya", Lata Mangeshkar, Manna Dey, Kaumudi Munshi & Vinod Sharma
- "O Phirkiwali, Tu Kal Phir Aana, Nahin Phir Jaana", Mohammad Rafi
- "Sang Basanti, Ang Basanti, Rang Basanti Chha Gaya", Mohammad Rafi, Lata Mangeshkar, Manna Dey
- "Tu Kitni Achhi Hai", Lata Mangeshkar
