= Aaj Ka Mahaatma =

- Directed by: Kundan Kumar
- Starring: Randhir Kapoor; Rekha
- Music by: Laxmikant–Pyarelal
- Release date: 1976
- Running time: 170 minutes
- Country: India
- Language: Hindi

Aaj Ka Mahaatma is a 1976 Bollywood romantic action film directed by Kundan Kumar. The film stars Randhir Kapoor and Rekha.

== Cast ==
- Randhir Kapoor as Randhir / Ranveer (Double role)
- Rekha as Mala
- Ranjeet as Tony
- Bindu as Julie
- Manmohan as Shankar
- Manmohan Krishna as Khanna
- Jeevan as Head Clerk
- Purnima as Ganga
- M. B. Shetty as Shetty
- Keshto Mukherjee as Pedro
- Dilip Dutt as William
- Sanjana as Ruby
- Manorama as Ruby's Mother
- Ramesh Deo

== Soundtrack ==
Alls songs were penned by Majrooh Sultanpuri

Song	Singer
"Tha Wo Bhi Kya Zamana"	Kishore Kumar
"Chandni Chand Se Hoti Hai, Sitaron Se Nahin"	Kishore Kumar, Asha Bhosle
"Dekho Ri Kaisi Sundar Bala"	Lata Mangeshkar
"Tum Aise Kahan Tak"	Lata Mangeshkar
