= So Saal Baad =

1966 film

- Film poster
- Directed by: B.K. Dubey
- Starring: Feroz Khan; Kumkum
- Music by: Laxmikant–Pyarelal
- Release date: 1966
- Country: India
- Language: Hindi

So Saal Baad is a 1966 Hindi film directed by B.K. Dubey starring Feroz Khan. The film was released on 29 December 1966 and was certified U by the Central Board of Film Certification.

== Plot ==
While working at an excavation site, a young engineer (Feroz Khan) notices an abandoned mansion where he hears a female voice singing a tragic song. When he investigates, he finds a beautiful apparition; what's more, there seems to be something quite familiar about her. He wonders if this is the ghost of someone from his past life.

== Cast ==
The cast is listed below:

- Feroz Khan
- Manmohan Krishna
- Kumkum
- Rajendra Nath
- D.K. Sapru

== Soundtrack ==
The soundtrack was composed by Laxmikant–Pyarelal. According to the author Ganesh Anantharaman, the first song, "Ek Ritu Aae Ek Ritu Jaae", is one of their "most tuneful numbers". Raju Bharatan of The Illustrated Weekly of India described "Ye Raat Bhi Jaa Rahi Hai" as an "unusual composition".

Track#	Title	Singer(s)
1	"Ek Ritu Aae Ek Ritu Jaae"	Manna Dey, Lata Mangeshkar
2	"Na Jayiyo Radhe"	Mohammed Rafi
3	"Ye Raat Bhi Jaa Rahi Hai"	Lata Mangeshkar
4	"Kisi Ki Nazar Ne Ishara Kiya Hai"	Lata Mangeshkar
5	"Ab Ke Baras Ye Bahar"	Manna Dey, Lata Mangeshkar
6	"Bhoola Hua Afsana"	Mohammed Rafi

== Reception ==
Shankar's Weekly wrote in a scathing review of the film that its story is "as confusing as much to the hero as to the audience" and took note of some "awful comedy" in it.
