= Hum Sab Ustad Hain =

- Promotional Poster
- Directed by: Maruti Rao
- Written by: Maruti Rao
- Story by: Maruti Rao
- Starring: Kishore Kumar; Dara Singh; Ameeta; Sheikh Mukhtar
- Production company: Sangam Films
- Distributed by: Super Cassettes Industries Limited (T-Series)
- Release date: 1965
- Country: India
- Language: Hindi

Hum Sab Ustad Hain is a 1965 Hindi film starring Kishore Kumar, Dara Singh and Ameeta.

== Plot ==
The film begins with Romi (Sheikh Mukhtar) shooting a man, though the attempt isn't fatal. Despite this, Romi is arrested, convicted, and sentenced to prison for murder. His pregnant wife Radha (Lalita Kumari) throws herself into the river but is later saved by a villager who takes her in, along with her son Ram (Dara Singh). After serving 14 years in prison, Romi spends the next eight years wandering. Rejected by society and unable to find work, Romi turns to a life of crime. When his gang is offered a large sum of money to smuggle national secrets, Romi kidnaps a young child and forces her sister Roopa (Ameeta) to transport the contraband. Roopa, who would rather die than betray her country, loses control of her car and drives into the river. She survives and is washed ashore in the village where Radha and Ram reside. Meanwhile, an unemployed Kishore (Kishore Kumar) decides to play detective and find the lost girl Radha and her sister. He tracks them down in the village and instantly falls in love with Radha. Romi and his gang also track them down and go to the city to help save Radha's sister. Around this time, Romi becomes a wrestler. Romi kidnaps Radha and discovers that they are his long-lost family. He then decides to sacrifice himself for his family, demonstrating that his heart remains honest and that his love for them has never wavered.

== Cast ==
- Ameeta as Roopa
- Bela Bose
- Edwina Lyons as Dancer
- Ratan Gaurang as Henchman
- King Kong as King Kong, Wrestler
- Kishore Kumar as Kishore
- Lalita Kumari as Radha
- Sheikh Mukhtar as Radha's husband
- Nasreen
- Maruti Rao as Sattar
- Dara Singh as Ram 'Ramu'

== Soundtrack ==
Lyrics by Asad Bhopali, Music by Laxmikant Pyarelal

| Song | Singers |
|---|---|
| "Pyar Baan te Chalo" | Kishore Kumar |
| "Kya Teri Zulfein Hain" | Kishore Kumar, Asha Bhosle |
| "Suno Jana Suno Jana" | Kishore Kumar |
| "Ajnabee Tum Jane Pehchane Se" (Male) | Kishore Kumar |
| "Ajnabee Tum Jane Pehchane Se" (Female) | Lata Mangeshkar |
