= Jalte Badan =

- Directed by: Ramanand Sagar
- Written by: Ramanand Sagar
- Starring: Kiran Kumar; Kumkum; Padma Khanna
- Music by: Laxmikant–Pyarelal
- Release date: 29 May 1973
- Country: India
- Language: Hindi

Jalte Badan is a 1973 Hindi-language drama film about the perils of drug addiction. The film is directed and produced by Ramanand Sagar.

== Plot ==
Kiran (Kiran Kumar) is a young man who goes to Bombay to study. While his university is caught up in a student strike, Kiran descends into drug use, encouraged by an evil mobster and the peer pressure of his fellow students. Kiran's only hope is that a kindly cabaret dancer Malti (Padma Khanna) will take pity on him and call for his snake charmer girlfriend Ganga (Kumkum) to rescue him with her true love.

== Cast ==
- Kiran Kumar as Kiran
- Kumkum as Ganga
- Padma Khanna as Malti
- V K Sharma
- Javed Khan Amrohi as a college student
- Tun Tun as Chameli
- Pradeep Kumar
- Raza Murad

== Music ==
Music for the film was by Laxmikant–Pyarelal and lyrics were written by Maya Govind.

Song	Singer
"Hum Woh Hain Jo Apna Ghar Jalake"	Lata Mangeshkar
"Gaon Gaon Ghumi, Shahar Shahar Chhana"	Lata Mangeshkar
"Vaada Bhool Na Jaana, O Jaanewale"	Lata Mangeshkar, Mohammed Rafi
"Aag Se Aag Bujha Le, Gham Na Kar"	Lata Mangeshkar, Asha Bhosle
