= Dafaa 302 =

- Directed by: Chand
- Produced by: B. Gupta
- Starring: Randhir Kapoor; Rekha
- Music by: Laxmikant–Pyarelal
- Production company: Fine Art Pictures
- Release date: 24 February 1975
- Country: India
- Language: Hindi

Dafaa 302 (transl. Section 302) is a 1975 Indian Hindi-language film directed by Chand, starring Randhir Kapoor, Rekha in the lead roles. The film follows Mohan as he attempts to save the employer of his brother who has been sentenced with murdering him while trying to find the real culprit. The title is a reference to Section 302 (Section of Murder) of the Indian Penal Code.

== Cast ==
- Randhir Kapoor as Shankar / Mohan (double role)
- Rekha as Rajkumari Rekha
- Bindu as Kamini
- Premnath as Raja Karan Singh
- Aruna Irani
- Roopesh Kumar as Girdhari
- Ashok Kumar as Advocate Ghosh
- Ajit as Advocate Saxena
- Chandrashekhar as Doctor
- Mohan Choti as Dilip Khanna
- Faryal as Dancer / Singer
- Gajanan Jagirdar as Judge
- Murad as D.I.G.
- Madan Puri as Inspector General of Police
- Jagdish Raj as Satish
- Asit Sen as Ramu

== Soundtrack ==
The songs of the film are composed by Laxmikant–Pyarelal, while all of the songs are written by Indeevar.

1. "Tu Mera Ram Main Lakhan Tera" (Happy) - Kishore Kumar
2. "Tu Mera Ram Main Lakhan Tera" (Sad) - Kishore Kumar
3. "Panchhi Phans Gayi Jaal Mein" - Lata Mangeshkar
4. "Dil To Dil Hai Phool Bhi Toda Nahin Hai" - Manna Dey, Suman Kalyanpur
5. "Kya Lenge Aap Kuch To Lena Padega" - Asha Bhosle
6. "Himmatwala Meri Doli Le Jayega" - Asha Bhosle
