= Aulad (1987 film) =

1987 film

Aulad औलाद
- Theatrical release poster
- Directed by: Vijay Sadanah
- Written by: Mushtaq Jalili (dialogues); S.H.Bihari (lyrics)
- Screenplay by: Mushtaq Jalili
- Story by: Vijay Sadanah
- Based on: Maa Babu (1960)
- Produced by: Chander Sadanah
- Starring: Jeetendra; Sridevi; Jaya Prada
- Cinematography: S.L. Sharma
- Edited by: Govind Dalwadi
- Music by: Laxmikant–Pyarelal
- Production company: Sadanah Brothers
- Release date: 8 April 1987
- Running time: 151 minutes
- Country: India
- Language: Hindi

Aulad (transl. Child) is a 1987 Indian Hindi-language drama film, produced by Chander Sadanah under the Sadanah Brothers banner and directed by Vijay Sadanah. Starring Jeetendra, Sridevi, Jaya Prada and music composed by Laxmikant–Pyarelal. The film is inspired by the Telugu film Maa Babu (1960), which itself was a remake of the Hindi film Chirag Kahan Roshni Kahan.

== Plot ==
Anand (Jeetendra) is a businessman. He comes across several times with a street dancer Devki (Sridevi). One day Anand's uncle (Saeed Jaffrey) informs him from abroad that he has decided to get him married in near future. Upon hearing this, Anand tells a lie to his uncle that he has already got married. Anand's uncle suddenly comes to India and asks for Anand's wife. Anand makes Devki his wife for a while to save himself from his uncle. Devki serves Anand's uncle as his father to the extent that he appreciates Devki and likes her from every aspect. Anand's uncle goes back abroad. Meanwhile, Anand falls in love with Devki and marries with her. Both happen to meet with another newly married couple Yashoda (Jaya Prada) and Vicky (Vinod Mehra). While Devki gives birth to a son names Kishan, Yashoda is expecting. The two couples meet on a train, which is ill-fated as it meets with an accident. Devki is nowhere to be found, and Anand believes she is dead. Vicky dies in the accident and Yashoda is devastated. Anand feels sorry for Yashoda and has the doctor switch his baby for the dead one. Yashoda returns to her home and her in-laws with Anand's child, while he re-locates abroad. Four years later, Anand returns and is unable to keep away from Yashoda and the child. He repeatedly keeps on visiting them, to the extent that his visits get to be a nuisance and an embarrassment. Then Anand is overjoyed to know that Devki is still alive. But when Devki asks about their child, he tells her the truth, thus setting off a tussle between the two mothers. Devki is further devastated by knowing that she can never give birth to a child again. Anand's uncle returns from abroad and sees devastated situation of Devki who was missing her son badly. Uncle can't bear the situation from which Devki is suffering from. He prepares to sue the matter publicly in court. Court passes order to hand the child over to Devki. However, the child cannot forget Yashoda. The situation begins from bad to worse and worst for Anand and Devki. Both decide to give the child back to Yashoda where he gets real happiness. When they hand the child over to Yashoda, Devki fells down due to headache. Doctor gives good news that miraculously she is expecting and would become mother in near future.

== Cast ==
- Jeetendra as Anand
- Sridevi as Devki
- Jaya Prada as Yashoda
- Vinod Mehra as Vicky
- Saeed Jaffrey as Anand's Uncle
- Baby Guddu as Kishan
- Asrani as Raja
- Bharat Bhushan
- Manmohan Krishna as Vicky's Father
- Murad
- Ramesh Deo
- Vikas Anand
- Shivraj
- Dina Pathak as Savitri
- Shammi
- Mumtaz Begum

== Soundtrack ==
#	Title	Singer(s)
1	"To Phir Ho Jaye"	Kishore Kumar, Kavita Krishnamurthy
2	"Lo Jaa Raha Hai Koi"	Mohammed Aziz
3	"Jeevan Jyot Jale"	Kavita Krishnamurthy
4	"Raste Ka Maal Saste Mein"	Usha Mangeshkar
5	"Lo Jaa Raha Hai Koi" (Sad)	Mohammed Aziz
6	"Ek Maa Ka Dil"	Kavita Krishnamurthy
7	"Ton Ton Ton"	Kavita Krishnamurthy
