= Film Hi Film =

1983 Indian Hindi-language film

- Directed by: Hiren Nag
- Produced by: Shabab Ahmed
- Starring: Pran; Ramesh Deo; Seema Deo
- Music by: Bappi Lahiri
- Release date: 1983
- Country: India
- Language: Hindi

Film Hi Film is a 1983 Indian Hindi-language film directed by Hiren Nag and produced by Shabab Ahmed. Its music was composed by Bappi Lahiri. The film stars Pran as a film producer struggling to complete a film featuring newcomers. The cast also includes Ramesh Deo and Seema Deo.

Throughout its narrative, the film incorporates footage from several incomplete and unreleased Hindi films, featuring performances by numerous prominent actors of earlier decades. In A Very Old Machine: The Many Origins of the Cinema in India (2015; SUNY Press), the film scholar Sudhir Mahadevan comments:

Film Hi Film manages to turn found footage into archival footage, where the archive is of the present, as well, and not just of the past. The movie's metahistoricity, if it is such at all, derives from the most transparent representational function of the lost scenes as they are incorporated into a larger melodramatic narrative and dramaturgical framework. We are watching a movie about movies. What we are watching is a transparent record, a record of movies as the referents of that record.

== Plot ==
Gyanchand (Pran), also known as Sethji, is a film producer who loses his fortune through unsuccessful investments and is reduced to poverty. A French journalist researching the history of cinema approaches him for an interview and pays him generously for his time. With the money, Gyanchand decides to return to film production.

Gyanchand's former technicians agree to work on the production without payment, and rehearsals and filming begin. After overcoming numerous difficulties, he completes the film, but struggles to find a distributor willing to release it. Frustrated, Gyanchand prepares to destroy the film reels. At this point, a former employee who has since become a successful distributor changes his mind and agrees to release the film.

The film, titled Film Hi Film, eventually premieres with a lavish celebration. The premiere features a disco number, the introduction of new actors as promising stars, and appearances by established Bombay film personalities.

== Cast ==
- Pran as Gyanchand / Sethji
- Ramesh Deo
- Seema Deo

These footage of incomplete films features performances by prominent Hindi film actors, including Amitabh Bachchan, Raj Kapoor, Madhubala, Dev Anand, Guru Dutt, Nutan, Rekha, Dilip Kumar, Manoj Kumar, Balraj Sahni, Sadhana, Mala Sinha, Vyjayanthimala, Rajendra Kumar, Raaj Kumar, Mehmood, Helen and Zaheeda.

== Soundtrack ==
The soundtrack for Film Hi Film was composed by Bappi Lahiri.

== Incorporated footage ==
Film Hi Film incorporates footage from incomplete commercial films into its narrative of a producer whose own production is threatened with remaining unfinished. The film's use of such footage forms part of its critique of the disorganized Hindi film industry.

The footage includes the incomplete films Shikwah (1954), Yeh Basti Yeh Log (1958), Picnic (1960), Reporter (1960), Naya Mandir (1961), Jahan Mile Dharti Aakash (1962), Behrupiya (1964), Sasta Khoon Mehnga Pani (1964), Sajan Ki Galiyan (1968), Ek Tha Chander Ek Thi Sudha (1970), and Khuda Gawah (1970). A sequence from K. Asif's unfinished Sasta Khoon Mehnga Paani is explicitly introduced by Pran's character, while other sequences include footage from films whose production had been abandoned or otherwise remained unreleased.
