= Asad Bhopali =

Indian poet and lyricist (1921–1990)

- Born: Asadullah Khan; 10 July 1921; Bhopal, Bhopal State, British India
- Died: 9 June 1990 (aged 68); Bombay, Maharashtra, India
- Occupations: Poet, Lyricist
- Years active: 1949–1990
- Awards: Filmfare Award for Best Lyricist in 1990

Asad Bhopali (10 July 1921 – 9 June 1990) was an Indian Hindustani poet and lyricist. The Encyclopaedia of Hindi Cinema, compiled by Gulzar and Saibal Chatterjee, describes him as one of the "few names that stand out for their contribution to Hindi film lyrics".

== Film career ==
Asad Bhopali was born on 10 July 1921 in Bhopal, as Asadullah Khan. He was the eldest child of Munshi Ahmed Khan, a teacher of Arabian and Persian languages.

In 1949, Asad Bhopali was spotted by the Fazli Brothers, a film producer duo of Bombay (now Mumbai). Following the partition of India, Aarzoo Lakhnavi, the lyricist of their film Duniya, migrated to newly created Pakistan. By this time, only two of the film's songs had been written. Fazli Brothers were looking for new lyricists. Businessman Sugam Kapadia, who owned a few cinema theatres in Bhopal, told them that there were many good poets in Bhopal, and suggested that they attend a mushaira (meet of poets) there. The Fazli Brothers agreed, and Kapadia organized a mushaira at his Bhopal Talkies on 5 May 1949. Impressed by Asad Bhopali's performance, the producers invited him to Bombay. At the age of 28, Asad Bhopali traveled to Bombay on 18 May 1949, to become a lyricist in the Hindi film industry.

Asad Bhopali wrote two songs for Fazli Brothers' Duniya (1949): Rona hai to chupke chupke (sung by Mohammad Rafi) and Armaan lute, dil toot gaya (sung by Suraiyya). The next year, he wrote songs for a couple of films; these songs were sung by Lata Mangeshkar and Shamshad Begum. Bhopali's big break was BR Chopra's Afsana (1951), for which he wrote 5 songs.

Bhopali went on to work with several noted music directors. He wrote the popular song Woh Jab Yaad Aaye, Bahut Yaad Aaye for Laxmikant–Pyarelal's first released film Parasmani. He wrote a large number of film songs composed by Usha Khanna. From 1949 to 1990, he wrote about 400 songs for over a hundred films. However, he was not as successful as the top lyricists such as Majrooh Sultanpuri, Sahir Ludhianvi, Jan Nisar Akhtar and Rajendra Krishan. Many of the films he wrote for were low-grade films, and he used to get only a few songs in high-end movies, unlike other established lyricists. Bhopali was one of the lyricists who wrote songs for the 1989 musical hit Maine Pyar Kiya. Shortly after, he suffered from a severe paralytic stroke later in 1989. His family took him to Bhopal. In 1990, he received the Filmfare Award for Dil Deewana, but could not attend the award ceremony.

== Death ==
Asad Bhopali died on 9 June 1990, in Bhopal. He wrote songs for Rang Bhoomi, which was released after his death, in 1992. Roshni, Dhoop, Chandni, a collection of his poetry, was published by the Urdu Akademi of Bhopal in 1995.

Asad Bhopali married twice. He had two sons (Taj and Taabish) and six daughters from his first marriage, with Ayesha. Ghalib Asad Bhopali, his son from his second wife, also became a film writer and lyricist who wrote movies like Bhindi Bazaar Inc and Mumbai Mirror. and Asad Bhopali's younger brother Qamar Jamaali also became an Urdu poet.

== Filmography ==
Asad Bhopali wrote over 400 film songs in over 100 films.

- Superman (1993)
- Ranbhoomo (1991)
- Police Public (1990)
- Maine Pyar Kiya (1989)(won the 'Filmfare Award for Best Lyricist' for it)
- Ladaaku (1981)
- Bin Phere Hum Tere (1979)
- Dada (1979)
- Meri Biwi Ki Shaadi (1979)
- Sone Ke Dil Lohe Ka Haath (1978)
- Badnaam (1976)
- Do Khiladi (1976)
- Gumrah (1976)
- Mazdoor Zindabad (1976)
- Playboy (1976)
- Vandana (1975)
- Ek Nari Do Roop (1973)
- Hum Sab Chor Hain (1973)
- Nirdosh (1973)
- Pyar Diwana (1972)
- Ek Paheli (1971)
- Ek Nanhi Munni Ladki Thi (1970)
- Ilzaam (1970)
- Sasta Mehanga Pyaar (1970)
- Aag (1967)
- Chhaila Babu (1967)
- Johar In Bombay (1967)
- Insaaf (1966)
- Main Wohi Hoon (1966)
- Naag Mandir (1966)
- Shera Daku (1966)
- Smuggler (1966)
- Boxer (1965)
- Ek Sapera Ek Lutera (1965)
- Hum Sab Ustad Hai (1965)
- Lootera (1965)
- Shreeman Funtoosh (1965)
- Aaya Toofan (1964)
- Khush Nasib (1964)
- Mr. X in Bombay (1964)
- Kahin Pyar Na Ho Jaye (1963)
- Mayal Mahal (1963)
- Parasmani (1963)
- Ustadon Ke Ustad (1963)
- Girls Hostel (1962)
- Pyar Ka Sagar (1961)
- Razia Sultan (1961)
- Tu Nahin Aur Sahi (1960)
- Zara Bachke (1959)
- Trolly Driver (1958)
- Insaaf (1956)
- Rajdhani (1956)
- Moti Mahal (1952)
- Afsana (1951)
- Aadhi Raat (1950)
- Duniya (1949)

== Notable songs ==
- Dil-e-nadaan zamaane me (Mast Qalandar)
- Aay mere dil-e-nadaan tu gham se na ghabaraana, (Tower House) (1962)
- Hum tum se juda ho ke (Ek Sapera Ek Lutera)
- Ye rang bhare baadal (Tu Nahin Aur Sahi)
- Woh jab yaad aaye bahut yaad aaye (Parasmani) (1963)
- Haasta hua noorani chehra (Parasmani)
- Ajnabee tum jane pehchaane se lagate ho, sung by Kishore Kumar (Hum Sab Ustad Hain) (1965)
- Kya teri zulfein hain (Hum Sab Ustad Hain)
- Sau baar janam lenge, Sau baar fana hongay (Ustadon Ke Ustad) (1963)
- Raaz-e-dil un se chhupaaya na gaya (Apna Banaa Ke Dekho)
- Dil ki baatein dil hi jaane (Roop Tera Mastana)
- Haseen dilruba kareeb aa zara (Roop Tera Mastana)
- Dil ka soona saaz taraana dhoondega ('Ek Nari Do Roop) (1973)
- Dost ban ke aaye ho (Bin Phere Hum Tere)
- Chand apna safar khatm karta raha (Shama)
- Dil diwaana bin sajna ke (Maine Pyar Kiya)

== Awards ==
- Filmfare Award for Best Lyricist, 35th Filmfare Awards (1990) for the song Dil Deewana Bin Sajana Ke from Maine Pyaar Kiya (1989)
