= Ramesh Deo =

Indian film actor (1929–2022)

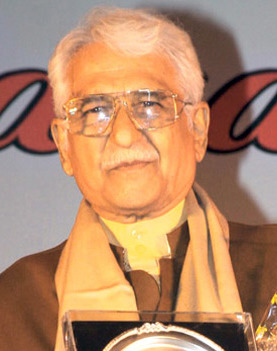
- Ramesh Deo in 2010
- Born: 30 January 1929; Kolhapur, Kolhapur State, India
- Died: 2 February 2022 (aged 93); Mumbai, Maharashtra, India
- Occupations: Actor; producer; director
- Years active: 1955–2022
- Spouse: Seema Deo (m. 1960)
- Children: Ajinkya Deo; Abhinay Deo
- Family: Deo family

Ramesh Deo (30 January 1929 – 2 February 2022) was an Indian film actor who worked in more than 285 Hindi films, 190 Marathi films and 30 Marathi dramas with over 200 showings in his long career. He also produced feature films, television serials and over 250 ad films. He directed a number of films, documentaries and television serials. He was the recipient of a Maharashtra State Film Award. In 2007, Deo was honoured with the V. Shantaram Lifetime Achievement Award, Maharashtra's highest award in the field of cinema. He also received Filmfare Marathi Lifetime Achievement Award for his contribution to Marathi cinema.

== Early life ==
Ramesh Deo was born in Kolhapur, Maharashtra on 30 January 1929. His ancestral roots are from a Rajput family of Jodhpur (Rajasthan). His father was a judge of Kolhapur. His ancestors shifted to Kolhapur as his great-grandfather and grandfather were both engineers. They built the Jodhpur Palace and were called by Chatrapati Shahu Maharaja to build the city of Kolhapur. His grandfather came down to become the chief engineer to Shahu Maharaj, and his father was his legal advisor.

== Career ==
He made his film debut with a cameo appearance in Paatlaachi Por, a Marathi film, in 1951. Andhala Magto Ek Dola (1956), directed by Raja Paranjape, was his first full-fledged role. He started off as a villain. His first Hindi film was Rajshree Productions' Aarti (1962). In his long career, he has played supporting roles in films with Rajesh Khanna in lead namely - Anand, Joroo Ka Ghulam, Aap Ki Kasam, Prem Nagar, Ashanti, Goraa. He has played supporting in Mehrbaan, Dus Lakh, Raampur Ka Lakshman, Fakira, Shatrughan Sinha starer Mere Apne and many more.

In January 2013, he received the Lifetime Achievement Award at the 11th Pune International Film Festival (PIFF). He worked in Nivdung, a Marathi serial in the year 2006.

== Personal life and death ==
Deo was married to Seema Deo, an actress formerly known as Nalini Saraf. His sons are Marathi actor Ajinkya Deo and Abhinay Deo, director of the 2011 film Delhi Belly. He died at Kokilaben Dhirubhai Ambani Hospital from a heart attack on 2 February 2022, at the age of 93.

== Selected filmography ==
=== Director ===
- Gosht Lagnanantarchi (2010)

=== Filmography ===
- Andhala Magto Ek Dola (1955)
- Gath Padli Thaka Thaka (1956)
- Deoghar (1956)
- Pasant Aahe Mulgi (1956)
- Saata Janmachi Sobti (1959)... Mohan Mohite
- Umaj Padel Tar (1960)
- Paishyacha Paaus (1960)
- Jagachya Pathivar (1960)
- Suvasini (1961)
- Majhi Aai (1961)
- Vardakshina (1962) ... Shantaram
- Bhagya Lakshmi (1962)
- Aarti (1962) ... Niranjan
- Majha Hoshil Ka? (1963)
- Padchhaya (1964)
- Shevatcha Malusura (1965)
- Love And Murder (1966)
- Gurukilli (1966)
- Dus Lakh (1966) ... Manohar
- Mehrban (1967)
- Chimukala Pahuna (1967)
- Swapna Tech Lochani (1967)
- Aparadh (1968)
- Shikar (1968) ... Naresh
- Saraswatichandra (1968)
- Teen Bahuraniyan (1968)
- Man Ka Meet (1968)
- Shart (1969)
- Bombay by Nite (1969)
- Patni (1970)
- Pardes (1970)
- Darpan (1970)
- Mujrim (1970)... Police Inspector
- Jeevan Mrityu (1970)
- Mastana (1970)
- Khilona... Kishore
- Chingari
- Albela (1971)
- Ganga Tera Pani Amrit (1971)
- Hulchul (1971)... Dir. Kumar
- Lakhon Mein Ek (1971) ... Keshavlal
- Anand (1971) ... Dr. Prakash Kulkarni
- Mere Apne (1971)... Arun Gupta
- Banphool (1971)
- Sanjog (1971)
- Zameen Aasmaan (1972)
- Rampur Ka Lakshman (1972)
- Manavataa (1972)
- Lalkar (1972)
- Koshish (1972)
- Joroo Ka Ghulam (1972)
- Bees Saal Pehle (1972)
- Bansi Birju (1972)
- Kashmakash (1973)
- Dharma (1973)
- Hum Junglee Hain (1973)
- Geetaa Mera Naam (1974)
- Aashiana (1974)
- 36 Ghante (1974)
- Kora Kagaz (1974)
- Prem Nagar (1974)... Lata's Brother
- Kasauti (1974)... Heera
- Sunehra Sansar (1975)
- Rani Aur Lalpari (1975)... Neighbour
- Owalte Bhauraya (1975)
- Zameer (1975)...Ramu, Servant
- Ek Mahal Ho Sapno Ka (1975)
- Aakhri Daao (1975)... Inspector Verma
- Salaakhen (1975)...Gautam
- Naag Champa (1976)
- Sankoch (1976)...Avinash
- Do Ladkiyan (1976)...Ramesh
- Aaj Ka Ye Ghar (1976)...Deshpande
- Aaj Ka Mahaatma (1976)
- Fakira (1976)...Ranjit
- Raees (1976)
- Phir Janam Lenge Hum/Janam Janam Na Saathi (1977) Hindi/Gujarati film
- Badla Marathi film
- Paradh (1977) (Hindi Dubbing Anjaam (1978 film))
- Jai Dwarkadheesh (1977)...Satdhanwa
- Prayashchit (1977)
- Rangaa Aur Raja (1977)
- Solah Shukrawar (1977)...Mohan
- Chalu Mera Naam (1977)...Shaka
- Heera Aur Patthar (1977)
- Do Chehere (1977)... Ramesh
- Yaaron Ka Yaar (1977)...Shekhar
- Yehi Hai Zindagi (1977)... Michael
- Hira Aur Patthar (1977)...Gangaram
- Jadu Tona (1977)
- Dream Girl (1977) ...Dr Kapoor
- Dost Asava Tar Asa (1978)
- Karwa Chouth (1978)
- Bapu Ka Sapna (1978)
- College Girl (1978)
- Bhola Bhala (1978)..Thakur Ajit Singh
- Anjane Mein (1978)...Police Inspector Gavaskar
- Heeralal Pannalal (1978)
- Janki (1979)
- Dada (1979)...Pyarelal
- Bombay by Nite (1979)
- Fatakadi (1980)
- Shiv Shakti (1980)
- Patita (1980)
- Farz Aur Pyar (1980)
- Dahshat (1981)... Inspector Mulla
- Kaaran (1981)
- Chhori Gaon Ki (1981)
- Bhamta (1982)
- Nek Parveen (1982)
- Hum Paagal Premee (1982)
- Anmol Sitaare (1982)
- Daulat ... Dharamdas
- Dulha Bikta Hai (1982)
- Chambal Ke Daku (1982)
- Haathkadi (1982) ... Ambarnath
- Shriman Shrimati (1982)
- Ashanti ... Inspector Ramesh
- Khud-daar (1982) ... Ramnathan
- Baiko Asavi Ashi (1983)
- Film Hi Film (1983)
- Taqdeer (1983) ... Randhir Pratap Singh
- Main Awara Hoon (1983) ... Premnath
- Savaasher (1984)
- Hech Majh Maher (1984) ... Neela's dad
- Hum Do Hamare Do (1984)
- Pachis Lakh (1984)
- Grahasthi (1984)
- Sharara (1984)
- Laila (1984) ... Chandru
- Patthar Dil (1985)
- Ek Chitthi Pyar Bhari (1985)
- Kabhi Ajnabi The (1985)
- Karmyudh (1985) ... Judge
- Hum Naujawan (1985)... Principal Verma
- Vidhaan (1986)
- Jawani Ki Kahani (1986)
- Ilzaam (1986)
- Kala Dhanda Goray Log (1986) ... Pandey
- Pyar Kiya Hai Pyar Karenge (1986)
- Allah-Rakha (1986)
- Mera Haque (1986) ... Diwan
- Khel Mohabbat Ka (1986)
- Sarja (1987)...Bahiraji Naik
- Sher Shivaji (1987)
- Kaamaagni (1987) ...Dinanath
- Kanoon Kanoon Hai (1987)
- Kudrat Ka Kanoon (1987) ... Judge
- Goraa (1987) ... Inspector Nitin
- Inaam Dus Hazaar (1987)
- Daku Hasina (1987)
- Aulad (1987) ... Dr. Ramesh Chandar
- Mera Yaar Mera Dushman (1987) ... Dinesh Kumar
- Mr. India (1987) ... Police Inspector
- Sindoor ... Judge
- Janam Janam (1988) ... Bheem Singh
- Sone Pe Suhaaga (1988) ... Ram Prasad Dubey
- Waqt Ke Zanjeer (1989)
- Gharana (1989) ... Munshi
- Toofan (1989) ... Ramesh Kumar
- Azaad Desh Ke Gulam (1990) ... Kishore Bhandari
- Pratibandh (1990)... Prosecuting Attorney
- Ghayal (1990) Varsha's Father
- Nishchaiy (1992)
- Ulfat Ki Nayi Manzilen (1994)
- Hain Kaun Woh (1999)
- A. K. 47 (1999) (Kannada-Telugu)
- Vasudev Balwant Phadke (2007)
- Galgale Nighale (2008)
- Vighnaharta... Shree Siddhivinayak (2009)... Bapuji
- Houn Jau De! (2009)
- Tinhisanja (2009)
- Aahat (2010)
- Goshta Lagnanantarchi (2010)
- Jetaa (2010)
- 2014 Raj Ka Ran (2011)... Kakasaheb
- Pipaani (2012)
- Jolly LLB (2013)... Kaul Sahab
- Chaandi (2013)
- Sankasur (2013)- Unreleased
- Mumbai Tiger (2013)- Unreleased
- Ghayal Once Again (2016) Kulkarni And Anushka's Grandfather
- Photograph (2019)... Doctor

== See also ==
- Seema Deo
- Ajinkya Deo
- Abhinay Deo
