= Parasmani =

Parasmani पारसमणी
- Promotional Poster
- Directed by: Babubhai Mistri
- Written by: C.K. Mast (dialogues)
- Screenplay by: Pandit Madhur; Vishwanath Pande
- Story by: Pandit Madhur; Vishwanath Pande
- Produced by: Pandit Madhur; Bachubhai Mistry
- Starring: Mahipal; Geetanjali
- Cinematography: Peter Pereira
- Edited by: Kamlakar Karkhanis
- Music by: Laxmikant–Pyarelal
- Production companies: Basant Studio; Ranjit Studios; Shreekant Studios
- Release date: 1963
- Country: India
- Language: Hindi

Parasmani ("Philosopher's stone" that converts iron into gold) is a 1963 Indian Hindi-language film. The film is a musical fantasy drama shot partly in Black and White and partly in colour. It was directed by Babubhai Mistri, who is known as the pioneer of cinematic effects. The film was financially successful. The film's music was given by Laxmikant Pyarelal and was their first official release movie. Classic songs like "Woh Jab Yaad Aaye", "Mere Dil mein halki si", "Hansta hua", "Roshan Tumhi se". "Roshan Tumhi Se Duniya" is set in the Hindustani raga Pahadi. The film was dubbed into Tamil with the title Maayamani and was released in 1964.

== Plot ==
Paras (played by Mahipal) is the son of the Senapati and is lost when his ship meets storms at sea. Paras is then found by a poor villager, who brings him up as his own. Paras grows up and becomes an accomplished swordsman and singer. One day, he encounters the princess (played by Gitanjali) and falls in love with her. His fame soon reaches the palace, and the Emperor summons him to sing for him. Pleased with his singing, the Emperor asks him for a wish, and Paras asks for the hand of his daughter. Enraged, the Emperor decides to punish Paras, but Paras escapes. Appearing defeated, the Emperor asks Paras to seek a rare gem called a Parasmani, because he is under a curse that states as soon as his daughter marries, it will be the last day for the Emperor. If Paras can find the Parasmani, the life of Emperor can be saved. Only then can Paras marry the princess. Parasmani is a hypothetical jewel which is considered to keep the bearer young forever. Paras agrees to this and leaves on the search with his sister and brother.

Paras receives clues from various places and is directed to a cave. From this point, the film is in Eastman Color. Fighting various magical creatures and volcanic lava, Paras meets the Sorceress Mayanagri, who falls in love with the brave Paras. Taking him in confidence, she shows him her real self, which is an old woman. The Sorceress shows him the Parasmani, which Paras gains after killing a giant spider-like creature. Soon the old sorceress also meets her end. Paras and his siblings fly back to their kingdom where, after some crucial fights, he meets his father, Senapati, and is married to the princess.

== Cast ==
- Geethanjali as Rajkumari (princess)
- Mahipal as Paras
- Nalini Chonkar as Roopa (Paras' sister)
- Maruti Rao as Tipu (Paras's brother)
- Jeevan Kala as Sorceress Mayanagri
- Aruna Irani as Bijli (Rajkumari's helper)
- Jugal Kishore as Senapati (Paras's father)
- Manher Desai as Emperor
- Helen as Dancer in song "Ooi Maa Ooi Maa"

== Soundtrack ==
The music of the film is composed by Laxmikant-Pyarelal. The lyrics are by Asad Bhopali and Faruk Kaisar (Hasnta Hua Noorani).

Song	Singer	Raga
"Mere Dil Mein Halki Si"	Lata Mangeshkar	
"Ooi Maa, Yeh Kya Ho Gaya"	Lata Mangeshkar	
"Hansta Hua Noorani Chehra, Kali Zulfen, Rang Sunehra"	Lata Mangeshkar, Kamal Barot	
"Chori Chori Jo Tumse Mili To Log Kya Kahenge"	Lata Mangeshkar, Mukesh	
"Woh Jab Yaad Aaye, Bahut Yaad Aaye"	Lata Mangeshkar, Mohammed Rafi	Yaman Kalyan
"Roshan Tum Hi Se Duniya"	Mohammed Rafi	

Ustad Zakir Hussain played tabla for the song, Roshan Tum Hi Se Duniya.

This film is the first independent film together of the musical duo Laxmikant-Pyarelal. Before this, they have worked under many musicians separately as well as together. This film also marks the beginning of the long relationship among them, Lata Mangeshkar and Mohammed Rafi.

"Hasta Hua Noorani Chehra" is also used in the film Hum Aapke Hain Koun..! while the characters are playing a game. The Parasmani soundtrack CD was released by EMI & cataloged as CDF 120248. It also included the songs from the film Lootera (1965). The CD is now considered very obscure and rare.
