= Mr. X in Bombay =

- Directed by: Shantilal Soni
- Written by: R. P. Ashk
- Produced by: C. M. Thakkar
- Starring: Kishore Kumar; Kumkum; Madan Puri
- Edited by: Shyam
- Music by: Laxmikant–Pyarelal
- Release date: 1964
- Running time: 130 minutes
- Country: India
- Language: Hindi

Mr. X in Bombay is a 1964 Indian science fiction romantic comedy film directed by Shantilal Soni and starring Kishore Kumar, Kumkum and Madan Puri.

== Plot ==
Shobha lives a wealthy lifestyle with her scientist dad Prof. Mathur, who is now carrying out experiments on various issues. One day while doing so, he makes an employee named Manohar drink a chemical, which results in his death. Rajan, a certain newcomer to Bombay, comes to their rescue, gets rid of the body, and starts blackmailing Mathur, which can only end when Shobha marries Rajan. Then one day she meets a poet by the name of Sudarshan and both of them fall in love. When he asks for her hand in marriage, she refuses.

The next day, Shobha finds a note addressed to her from Sudarshan in which he has stated that he is going to kill himself. Thereafter, every night she starts to hear Sudarshan's voice, blaming her for his death, as his soul is unable to find solace. With Sudarshan out of the way, Rajan readies himself for marrying Shobha - and it looks like he may have his way with the Mathur after all - without having to encounter any more obstacles. But all this time, Sudarshan was actually invisible and not dead. With the help of Shobha's father, he gets visible again. They get married and live happily ever after.

== Cast ==
- Kishore Kumar as Kavi Sudarshan
- Kumkum as Shobha Mathur
- Madan Puri as Rajan
- Randhir as Professor Mathur
- Mohan Choti as Tribhang Das
- Leela Mishra as Sudarshan's mother
- Jeevan Kala as Neena
- Kesari as Reena
- Polson
- Tuntun

== Soundtrack ==
The music was composed by Laxmikant–Pyarelal and the lyrics for the songs were penned by Anand Bakshi and Asad Bhopali.

The song "Mere Mehboob Qayamat Hogi", sung by Kishore Kumar, became an evergreen hit.

Song	Singer
"Mere Mehboob Qayamat Hogi"	Kishore Kumar
"Mere Mehboob Qayamat Hogi version 2"	Kishore Kumar
"Ruk Ja Rokta Hai Ye Diwana"	Kishore Kumar
"Chali Re Chali Gori Paniya Bharan Ko Chali"	Kishore Kumar, Lata Mangeshkar
"Khoobsurat Haseena Jaan-E-Jaan Jaan-E-Man"	Kishore Kumar, Lata Mangeshkar
"Allah Kare Tu Bhi Aa Jaye"	Lata Mangeshkar
"Julmi Hamare Sanwariya Ho Ram"	Lata Mangeshkar
