= Half Ticket =

Half Ticket may refer to:

- Half Ticket (1962 film), an Indian Hindi-language comedy film
- Half Ticket (2016 film), an Indian Marathi-language film
