= School Master =

School Master may refer to:

- Schoolmaster, a male graduate teacher
- School Master (1958 film), a Kannada film directed by B. R. Panthulu
- School Master (1959 film), a Hindi film directed by B. R. Panthulu
- School Master (1964 film), a Malayalam film directed by S. R. Puttanna
- School Master (1973 film), a Tamil film directed by B. R. Panthulu
- School Master (2010 film), a Kannada film directed by Dinesh Babu
