= Shammi (actress) =

Indian actress

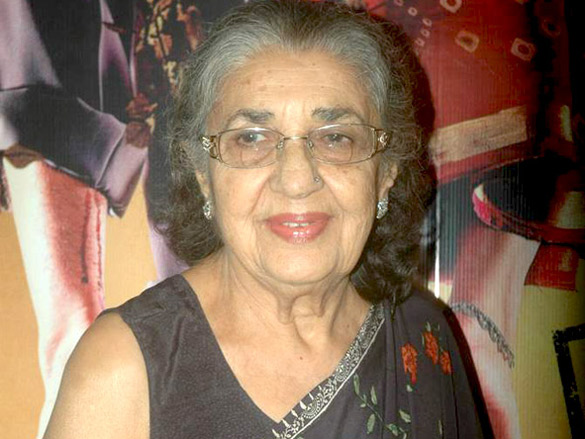
- Born: Nargis Rabadi; 24 April 1929; Bombay, Bombay Presidency, British India
- Died: 6 March 2018 (aged 88); Mumbai, Maharashtra, India
- Occupation: Actress
- Years active: 1949–2018
- Spouse: Sultan Ahmed (m. 1973; div. 1980)
- Children: 1
- Relatives: Mani J. Rabadi (sister)

Nargis Rabadi (24 April 1929 – 6 March 2018), better known by her stage name Shammi, was an Indian actress who appeared in over two hundred Hindi films. Shammi remained a sought-after actress with filmmakers when it came to goofy and comic roles, especially in the period 1949–1969 and later from 1980–2002. Her famous films as supporting actress included Dil Apna Aur Preet Parai, Half Ticket, Halaku, Samaj Ko Badal Dalo, Khuda Gawah, Coolie No. 1, Gopi Kishan and Hum Saath Saath Hain and films with Rajesh Khanna like The Train, Aanchal, Kudrat, Red Rose, Awara Baap and Swarg. She had been a leading actress playing main female lead or second female lead in Hindi films between 1949–1955 as well. Later, from 1986 till 1998, she appeared in many popular television serials such as Dekh Bhai Dekh, Zabaan Sambhal Ke, Shriman Shrimati, Kabhi Yeh Kabhi Woh and Filmi Chakkar. Shammi is the younger sister of fashion designer Mani Rabadi.

== Early life ==
Rabadi was born in 1929 in Bombay, India. Her father was a priest in an agyari (Parsi fire temple) and died when she was around three years old. After her father's death, her mother used to cook food at all the religious functions organized by the Parsi community to earn money. Rabadi had an elder sister Mani Rabadi, who was a fashion designer and worked extensively with many actresses as their dress designer in Hindi films between 1967 and 1994. Her mother's younger sister lived with her. They stayed in Tata Blocks in Parel, South Mumbai in 1930–47 period. Her sister joined Johnson and Johnson as a secretary after completing her secondary school education.

In 1942, Johnson and Johnson manufactured tablets and Rabadi was employed in the packing department. Her job was to collect the tablets that were not sealed in the tablet case, and had fallen off from the machine. She had to put them into big bottles which would go to hospitals for free distribution to patients. She was paid Rs 100 per month for doing this job.

== Career ==
Shammi got into films by chance. A family friend was very friendly with actor and producer Sheikh Mukhtar. At that time, Mukhtar was looking for an actress for the second lead, in a film he was to start with Begum Para as the main female lead. He got her to meet Sheikh Mukhtar. Mukhtar was concerned about her Hindi-speaking skills as she was a Parsi. Shammi immediately told a worried Sheikh that she would be talking with him in Hindi and that he should point out any flaw if he was able to find any. Sheikh Mukhtar was impressed with her. The next day, she was called to Mahalaxmi studios for her screen test. She was advised by director Tara Harish to change her name to "Shammi" as there was another actress named Nargis in the industry. Her monthly salary was Rs 500. She was asked to sign a three-year contract with a condition that she couldn't work outside without their permission. She was just 18 when she signed for her first film, Ustad Pedro, in January 1949. Ustad Pedro had Sheikh Mukhtar opposite Begum Para and Mukri as the comedian and it was directed by Tara Harish and this Begum Para-Sheikh Mukhtar starrer was a hit film at the box office in 1949.

She had to attend the studio every day and practice acting even when she had no shoot. Shammi had to read dialogues of other films and Harish, the film's director taught her a lot of things since he was an actor himself. Harish was directing another film produced by Mukesh, called Malhar. Shammi was given the main lead in that film. Since the director was the same, Shammi was allowed to work outside the Sheikh Mukthar banner. She got good reviews for Malhar. The movie's music was also a hit. 'Malhar' made Shammi a star. Shammi was financially stable now, so they shifted to Bandra. During the shooting of Malhar, she met Nargis Dutt through the latter's mother Jaddan bai. They became good friends. Nargis was one of her best friends and later, because of their friendship she got a supporting role in the film Miss India. She quoted in an interview "Nargis was the first actor to be paid Rs 1 lakh; even Dilip Kumar did not get that kind of money then. It was the talk of the industry. Actors like me who did supporting roles would get anything around Rs 10,000 to Rs 15,000."

Her third film with Dilip Kumar and Madhubala, called Sangdil. The movie was released late in 1952 and was only a moderate success. Since Sangdil was unpopular with audience, she did not get work for seven months. Shammi started off by playing the main lead or second lead in films, but after Sangdil, she had to accept whatever work came to her. She acted as a vamp in few such films. She quoted in an interview: "Many people scolded me when I did that but I was clear in my mind that I had to work. Sitting at home would not help me since I was the breadwinner of the family." She got roles as the leading heroine opposite heroes such as Mahipal, Manhar Desai and Karan Dewan. After release of M. Sadiq's hit film Musafir Khana, she was flooded with similar roles. Her role opposite comedian Johnny Walker was appreciated in this film. She thereby went on to star opposite Johnny Walker in many other films.

Some of her successful movies as supporting actress in this period were Ilzam (1954), Pehli Jhalak (1955), Bandish (1955), Azaad (1955), Halaku (1956), Son of Sinbad (1955), Raj Tilak (1958), Khazanchi (1958), Ghar Sansar (1958), Aakhiri Dao (1958), Kangan (1959), Bhai-Bahen (1959) and Dil Apna Aur Preet Parai (1960). The rest of her films released from 1952 to 1960 were deemed as commercial failures. In the period 1962 to 1970, her comedy and vamp roles made an impact in successful films such as Half Ticket, Ishaara, Jab Jab Phool Khile, Preet Na Jane Reet, Aamne - Saamne, Upkar, Ittefaq, Sajan, Doli, Raja Saab and The Train.

In the early 1970s, she started being offered character roles, mostly playing mothers, in movies like Purab Aur Paschim and Adhikar. She won the BFJA Award as Best Supporting Actress for Samaj Ko Badal Dalo (1971). She married an aspiring director named Sultan Ahmed. He used Shammi's connections in the industry to get work. Her friends like Rajesh Khanna, Sunil Dutt and Asha Parekh worked in films directed by Sultan Ahmed. Her husband's directorial ventures such as Heera (1973), Dharam Kanta, and Daata were successful. During this period, Shammi did not accept offers from other directors and due to this she started getting fewer offers to act in films. In hindsight, she admitted that that had been a mistake on her part.

Shammi suffered two miscarriages and there were no further pregnancies. So, she and Sultan Ahmed did not have any children. This created tension in their relationship. The couple had bought a house and her husband wanted to put the house in her name. Shammi was of the opinion that since her sister-in law did not have an income, Ahmed should put the house in his sister's name. Ahmed's brother in law's family also resided with them. Shammi was close to her brother-in-law's children and took care of them. After seven years of marriage, she separated from her husband in 1980. She walked out of the house without taking anything with her, including her car. She returned to her old house where she stayed with her mother in Bandra. Nargis Dutt helped Shammi get a role in The Burning Train within eight days after Shammi had left her house. Her friend Rajesh Khanna helped her get small roles in films with him in the lead from 1980 such as Red Rose, Aanchal, Kudrat, Awara Baap and Swarg. These films got her noticed as a supporting actress and revived her career.

Encouraged by her recent successes, she decided to produce a film named Pighalta Aasman in 1985. Rajesh Khanna was going to act in the film, and he suggested the name of Esmayeel Shroff as the director. There was reportedly an altercation between Esmayeel and Khanna, after which Khanna walked out of the film. It had not gone on the floors then. Shammi had brought in a big actress, Raakhee, as Rajesh Khanna was starring in the film. The distributors were dissatisfied with Shammi as she had promised them Rajesh Khanna. She then approached Shashi Kapoor. On this topic, she quoted in an interview: "He (Shashi Kapoor) did not even ask me how much I was going to pay him. Everything fell in place. But the director sucked the life out of me. He fought with everyone on the sets. Ultimately, he was thrown out of the film before the dubbing was completed. I directed the film. The film bombed at the box office. I knew it would flop. I went into a big loss."

To help her recover from the losses, Rajesh Khanna, who was producing television series then, helped Shammi get a few roles on TV shows. She was getting paid well for her roles in both movies and TV shows, and this time she started saving money. Her performances in serials such as Dekh Bhai Dekh, Zabaan Sambhal Ke, Shriman Shrimati, Kabhi Yeh Kabhi Woh and Filmi Chakkar were appreciated. She was very much in demand from 1990 to 2000, appearing in many successful films such as Coolie No 1, Hum, Mardon Wali Baat, Gurudev, Gopi Kishan, Hum Saath-Saath Hain and Imtihaan. Her portrayal of the role of a drug addict in Mahesh Bhatt's Lahu Ke Do Rang got her good reviews. Movie offers, however, stopped coming to her after 2002 since she was getting older. She was rarely offered any roles from 2008 to 2011.

She made a comeback with Shirin Farhad Ki Toh Nikal Padi in 2013; as the director Bela Sehgal wanted her for the role of a Parsi woman.

== Personal life ==
Shammi was married to film producer & director Sultan Ahmed for seven years, before they were divorced.

== Death ==
Shammi died in her sleep on 6 March 2018, aged 88.

== Filmography ==
=== Hindi ===
Year	Title	Role	Notes
1949	Ustad Pedro	Shammi	Debut film; her character name in this film gave her the screen name Shammi.
1951	Malhar	Reshmi	
1952	Sangdil	Mohini	
1953	Aag Ka Dariya	Meera	
1953	Baghi		
1953	Khoj		
1954	Hukumat		
1954	Ilzam	Rekha	
1954	Kasturi		
1954	Munna		
1954	Roohi		
1954	Sheeshe Ki Diwar		
1955	Azaad	Janaki	
1955	Bandish	Kavita	
1955	Lagan		
1955	Musafirkhana	Mary	
1955	Pehli Jhalak	Girija	
1955	Rukhsana		
1955	Shahi Mehman		
1956	Anjaan - Somewhere In Delhi	Lachchhi	
1956	Halaku	Naubahar	
1956	Hotel		
1956	Rangeen Raten	Revdi	Guest Appearance
1956	Makkhee Choos	Sattu's friend	
1956	Lalten		
1956	Talwar Ki Dhani		
1957	Bhakt Dhruv		
1957	Jeevan Saathi		
1957	Miss India	Pyarelal's wife	
1957	Nausherwan-E-Adil	Altaf's wife	
1957	Tajposhi		
1958	Aakhri Dao	Nargis Daruwallah	
1958	Aji Bas Shukriya	Vimala	
1958	Chal Baaz		
1958	Chaubees Ghante		
1958	Ghar Sansar	Maneka	
1958	Kal Kya Hoga		
1958	Khazanchi	Roma	
1958	Miss Punjab Mail		
1958	Naya Paisa		
1958	Raj Tilak	Govind's wife	
1958	Sitaron Se Aagey	Lattu's girlfriend	
1958	Son Of Sinbad		
1959	Bhai-Bahen	Julie	
1959	Black Cat	Bulbul	Uncredited
1959	Forty Days	Anokhi	
1959	Kangan	Gopi	
1959	Jawani Ki Hawa	Mary Masketta	
1959	Madam XYZ		
1959	Zara Bachke		
1960	Bade Ghar Ki Bahu		
1960	Dil Apna Aur Preet Parai	Sheila	
1960	Gambler		
1960	Police Detective		
1960	Return of Mr. Superman	typist	
1960	Trunk Call		
1960	Zimbo Comes To Town		
1961	Dekhi Teri Bombai	Maya	
1961	Khiladi		
1961	Reshmi Roomal	Salma	
1961	Rocket Girl		
1961	Suhag Sindoor	Padma	
1961	Teen Ustad		
1961	Wanted		
1962	Bezuban	Lilly	
1962	Half Ticket	Lilly	
1962	Nakli Nawab	Najma	
1963	Phool Bane Angaare	Vimala	
1964	Daal Me Kala	Sheila	
1964	Ishaara	Muniya	
1964	Tarzan Aur Jalpari		
1965	Bekhabar		
1965	Jab Jab Phool Khile	Stella	
1965	Mujrim Kaun Khooni Kaun		
1965	Nishan	Padma's maid	
1966	Badal	Bindiya	
1966	Laadla	Dhanwanti	
1966	Nagin Aur Sapera		
1966	Preet Na Jane Reet	Sharada	
1967	Aamne-Samne	Itabai Mukherjee	
1967	Awara Ladki		
1967	Duniya Nachegi	Rosemerry	
1967	Upkar		
1968	Baazi	Lucy Fernandes	
1968	Man Ka Meet	Paro	
1969	Doli		
1969	Ittefaq	Basanti	
1969	Raja Saab	Malti	
1969	Sajan	Aunty	
1969	Shart	Johnny's Malhotra's Punjabi girlfriend	
1969	Shatranj	Soldier	
1970	Darpan	Lachchhi	
1970	Lachchi		
1970	Mere Humsafar	Suzie	
1970	Purab Aur Paschim	Rita	
1970	Samaj Ko Badal Dalo	Gomti	
1970	The Train	Gita	Guest appearance
1970	Yaadgaar	Sukhiya	
1971	Adhikar	Rajan's mother	
1971	Purani Pehchan		
1972	Annadata	Mrs. Anwar	
1972	Bandagi		
1972	Ek Hasina Do Diwane	Major's wife	
1973	Honeymoon	Mrs. Ramakant	
1973	Jwar Bhata	Satwanti	
1974	Chhote Sarkar	Gulabi	
1974	Pagli		
1978	Swarg Narak	Shobha's mother	
1979	Hum Tere Ashiq Hain	Teacher	
1979	Lahu Ke Do Rang	Roma's mother	Guest appearance
1979	Maan Apmaan	Ramdas' wife	
1980	Aanchal	Chachi	
1980	Bombay 405 Miles	Shammi	Special appearance
1980	Patita	Maria	
1980	Red Rose	Roopsagar Clothing Stores Manager	
1980	The Burning Train	Marwari Seth's wife on the train	
1981	Chehre Pe Chehra	Daisy's friend	
1981	Kranti	Bharat's foster mother	
1981	Kudrat	Sarla	
1981	Prem Geet	Gynaecologist	
1982	Angoor	Raj Tilak's wife	
1982	Arth	Mrs. Bhalla	
1982	Dil...Akhir Dil Hai	Psychiatrist	
1982	Do Dishayen	Mrs. Rustomji	
1982	Khud-Daar	Seema's mother	
1983	Nastik	Rosie	
1983	Rachna		
1983	Shubh Kaamna	Rattan's aunt	
1983	Sweekar Kiya Maine	Mrs. Sharma	
1983	Yahan Se Shehar Ko Dekho		
1984	Jawaani		
1984	Karishma	Nisha's mother	
1984	Sasural	Jagdamba	
1985	Awara Baap		
1985	Bond 303	Rosie	
1985	Hum Dono	Mrs. Mathura Das	
1985	Jhoothi	Shanti	
1985	Kali Basti	Mary Pereira	
1985	Mohabbat	Choudhary's mother	
1985	Paisa Yeh Paisa	Rosie	
1985	Patthar Dil	Mrs. Chaurasia	
1985	Pighalta Aasman	No	Only film as a producer & co-director. The film was initially shot by director Esmayeel Shroff but when he left the film over some differences with her, Shammi herself stepped up & completed the film, Shroff was not credited in the film. The film's male lead, Shashi Kapoor, an old friend of hers, did not charge any fee for the film.
1985	Tawaif	Mrs. Nigam	
1985	Tulsi		
1986	Baat Ban Jaye	Prakash's neighbour	
1986	Ek Chadar Maili Si	Jelmi	
1986	Karma	Dharma's aunt	
1986	Pahunche Huwey Log		
1986	Preeti		
1986	Shingora	Mausi	TV movie
1987	Aulad	Leela	
1987	Imaandaar	Ameena	
1987	Insaaf	Avinash's mother	
1987	Mera Lahoo	Avanti Singh	
1987	Muqaddar Ka Faisla		
1988	Akhri Muqabla	Ganga	
1988	Kasam	Bua	
1988	Mardon Wali Baat	Chaila's mother	
1988	Rama O Rama	Mary D'Souza	
1989	Anokha Aspatal		
1989	Eeshwar	Eeshwar's grandmother	
1989	Gawaahi	Betty Lobo	
1989	Jurrat	Joseph's mother	
1989	Mohabat Ka Paigham	Chand Bibi	
1989	Saaya	Nurse	
1989	Shehzaade	Zorawar's mother	Uncredited role
1989	Vardi	Customer	
1990	Agneepath	Tara Bai	
1990	Amavas Ki Raat		
1990	Awaragardi		
1990	Bahaar Aane Tak	Vijay's mother	
1990	Dil	Madhu's grandmother	
1990	Maha-Sangram	Mary	
1990	Sailaab	Yashoda	
1990	Swarg	Kumar's mother	uncredited
1991	Dil Hai Ki Manta Nahin	Parsi lady who gives a lift	
1991	Farishtay	Mausi	
1991	Hafta Bandh		
1991	Hum	Aarti's mother	
1991	Jeena Teri Gali Mein		
1991	Trinetra	Bantu	
1992	Honeymoon	Maya	
1992	Ghar Jamai	Sadhuram's wife	
1992	Khuda Gawah	Khuda Baksh's mother	
1992	Saatwan Aasman	Sujit's grandmother	
1992	Yudhpath	Mrs. Choudhary	
1993	Balmaa	Mrs. Pinto	
1993	Gunaah	A woman who bought Singh's flat	
1993	Gurudev	Sur Tali	
1993	Pehla Nasha	Deepak's landlady	
1993	Raunaq		
1993	Shabnam		
1994	Chauraha	Grandmother	
1994	Cheetah	Jessie	
1994	Ghar Ki Izzat	Aunt	
1994	Gopi Kishan	Janki	
1994	Imtihaan	Orphanage manager	
1994	Paramaatma	Rudranarayan's wife	
1994	Ulfat Ki Nayi Manzilen		
1995	Anokhi Chaal		
1995	Coolie No. 1	Hoshiyar Chand Choudhary's mother	
1995	Policewala Gunda		
1995	Rangeela	Gulbadan's mother	
1995	Thumka		
1996	Mr. Bechara	caretaker	
1997	Aur Pyaar Ho Gaya	Grandmother	
1997	Uff! Yeh Mohabbat	Mrs. Usgaonkar	
1999	Hum Saath-Saath Hain	Durga	
2000	Kunwara	Mrs. Viswanath Prathap Singh	
2000	Tera Jadoo Chal Gaya	Grandmother	
2001	Hum Ho Gaye Aapke	Aunty	
2001	Yeh Raaste Hain Pyaar Ke	Rohit's grandmother	
2002	Karz: The Burden of Truth	Balwant Singh's mother	
2002	Kyaa Dil Ne Kahaa	Esha's grandmother	
2005	Chalta Hai Yaar		
2008	Khushboo	Pinky's grandmother	
2009	Accident on Hill Road	Mrs. Wadia	
2011	Khap	Masterni	
2012	Shirin Farhad Ki Toh Nikal Padi	Farhad's grandmother	

=== Punjabi ===
Year	Title	Role	Notes
1958	Nikki		
1963	Lado Rani		
1980	Lambhardarni	Paro	
1982	Sarpanch	Swaran Chanda's wife	
1984	Jigri Yaar	Jeeto	
1984	Nimmo	Karma's mother	
1984	Yaari Jatt Di	Jeeta's mother	
1985	Ucha Dar Baba Nanak Da	Gurdit's mother	
1990	Qurbani Jatt Di	Jagroop's mother	
1992	Mehndi Shagna Di	Sadarni Jagir Kaur	
2010	Sukhmani : Hope For Life		

=== Marathi ===
Year	Title	Role	Notes
1971	Donhi Gharcha Pahuna		

=== Television ===
Title	Year	Role	Note	Ref.
Idhar Udhar	1985	Mrs. Braganza		
Dekh Bhai Dekh	1993	Chhoti Nani		
Filmi Chakkar	1993	Grandmother		
Zabaan Sambhalke	1993	Mrs. Pinto		
Shrimaan Shrimati	1994	Chintu's maternal grandmother		
Tehkikaat	1994		Twins Illusion (episode 10,11)	
Hudd Kar Di	2000	Laajo	Epi. 54	
Shararat	2003	Rani	2 Episodes	
