= Shakila (actress) =

Indian actress

- Born: Badshah Jehan; 1 January 1936; Kingdom of Afghanistan
- Died: 20 September 2017 (aged 81); Mumbai, Maharashtra, India
- Occupation: Actress
- Years active: 1949–1963
- Notable work: Aar Paar (1954); C.I.D. (1956); China Town (1962)
- Spouse: Y. M. Ilyas (m. 1966)
- Children: Meenaz (deceased)
- Relatives: Johnny Walker (brother-in-law)

Shakila (born Badshah Jehan; 1 January 1936 – 20 September 2017) was an Indian actress, best known for her roles in Guru Dutt's films, Aar Paar (1954) and C.I.D. (1956).

== Life and career ==
According to Shakila herself, who was interviewed by film historian Shishir Krishna Sharma (of Beete Hue Din blog fame) at her residence for his column Kya Bhooloon Kya Yaad Karoon during the 2000s, she said, "My ancestors belonged to the royal families of Afghanistan and Iran. I was born on 1 January 1936 (not 1935 as is wrongly stated everywhere) in the Afghanistan. My paternal grandparents and mother were killed during family feuds over the throne. I was the eldest among three sisters. Taking us children along, my father and my aunt (father's sister) came to Mumbai (then Bombay) to save their lives. I was around 4 years old at that time." According to her, her father too died soon after following which her aunt Feroza Begum had got engaged to a prince named Shahzad but he too died while playing a cricket match in London even before their marriage could commence. Following such tragedies, her aunt decided to stay unmarried and she, in turn, brought up Shakila and her sisters, Noor and Nasreen (alias Ghazala), thereby educating them at home itself.

Shakila further recalled, "My aunt was very fond of watching films. I used to accompany her for the film shows and got inclined towards films too. We were family friends with Kardar (Abdur Rashid Kardar) and Mehboob (Mehboob Khan). We used to meet on Eid and were regular visitors to each other's houses. It was Kardar who offered me the role of a 13-14 year old girl in the movie Dastan. The movie was released in 1950 and marked my film debut. It was for this movie that I adopted the stage name of Shakila instead of my given name of Badshah Jehan." In Dastan (1950), she played the childhood part of the character whose adult part was essayed by Veena. Although this was her first role, her other film Duniya (1949) released earlier which ended up being her first release. In both the films, Suraiya played the lead. Following this, Shakila played secondary or negative roles in films which includes Gumashta (1951), Khubsurat, Rajrani Damayanti, Saloni, Sindbad The Sailor (all 1952), Aagosh, Arman, Jhansi Ki Rani, Shahenshah (all 1953). In Jhansi Ki Rani (1953), she played the role of a young Rani Lakshmi Bai (whose adult part was played by Mehtab Modi). Meanwhile, the film Madmast (1953) was her debut as a leading film actress where she was cast opposite Nissar Ahmad Ansari. She also played the lead role in Rajmahal the same year. However, she gained recognition from the film Aar Paar (1954), produced, directed and starring Guru Dutt (his first film as a producer). Shakila remembered that after the success of Baiju Bawra (1952), actress Meena Kumari had been the star of Homi Wadia's Basant Pictures' religious and fantasy movies like Veer Ghatotkach (1949), Shri Ganesh Mahima (1950), Lakshmi Narayan, Hanuman Pataal Vijay and Aladdin Aur Jadui Chirag (1952), had become busy with social movies. She could not avail dates for Homi Wadia's next film. This was around the same time Shakila was given the title of Arabi Chehra (Arabian Beauty) in the film industry. When Homi Wadia tried to approach her for this role after Kumari turned it down, her aunt, being her secretary and with the aim to reject the offer, then demanded a sum of Rs. 10,000 for Shakila to act in this film. However, to her surprise, Wadia agreed to the remuneration as a result of which Shakila ended up playing the lead actress part in Alibaba Aur 40 Chor (1954) opposite Mahipal. This film not only became popular but also its massive success made Shakila get offers largely for fantasies and costume dramas. For the next decade, Shakila acted in all kinds of movies viz. Gul Bahar, Lalpari, Laila, Noor Mahal (all 1954), Ratnamanjari, Shahi Chor (both 1955), Hatim Tai, Khul Ja Sim-Sim (both 1956), Alladin Leila, Maya Nagri, Naag Padmani, Paristan (all 1957), Sim Sim Margina (1958), Doctor Z (1959) Abdulla (1960), Bagdad Ki Raaten (1962) etc. She was frequently cast opposite actors Daljeet, Mahipal, Shahu Modak, Paidi Jairaj, Ajit Khan and Premnath Malhotra. During this time, she also starred opposite Dev Anand in C. I. D. (1956), Sunil Dutt in Post Box 999 (1958), Raj Kapoor in Shriman Satyawadi (1960), Manoj Kumar in Reshmi Rumal (1961) and Nakli Nawab (1962), Shammi Kapoor in China Town (1962) and Pradeep Kumar in Mulzim and Ustadon Ke Ustad (both 1963), the latter being her last release.

According to Shakila, "I got married in 1966. My husband (Y. M. Ilyas) was from Afghanistan and was its Consulate General in India." After her marriage, Shakila went to Germany. She spent the next 25 years of her life there and in United States of America. She occasionally visited Mumbai where she had a house and where her sisters used to stay. However, owing to her personal issues (probable reason being the ending of her marriage), she eventually returned to India for good. She had a daughter named Meenaz who jumped to her death in 1991. She then moved back to Mumbai and stayed close to her sisters and friends. She declined all film and television offers and refused to make an acting comeback, since she wanted fans to remember her as a young, beautiful heroine. She died of a massive heart attack at the age of 81 on 20 September 2017 in Mumbai, India. She is buried at Mahim cemetery in Mumbai, Maharashtra.

== Noor (Shakila's sister) alias Mrs. Johnny Walker ==
Shakila's younger sister Noorjehan (shortened to Noor) was also a former actress who had a brief career in films. According to Noor's daughter Tasneem Khan who spoke about her mother in the blog Dustedoff, "My mummy's name is Noor, though people know her as Mrs. Johnny Walker or actress Shakila's sister. She is 2nd amongst three extremely beautiful sisters Shakila, Noor and Nasreen, all of whom have had their fair share of acting exposure in Indian Cinema. Mummy got her first break in films was when she did the childhood role of actress Noor Jehan in the film Anmol Ghadi (1946). A very popular song was picturised on her in a horse carriage - "Udan Khatole Pe Udh Jaaoon...". In 1947, in the film Dard, she played the role of Suraiya, portraying Munawar Sultana's childhood. She was also present in Do Bigha Zamin, in 1953 in a cameo role as Rani, the granddaughter of the land lady in the basti when Balraj Sahni comes to the city. Another film, Alif Laila, in 1953 starring Nimmi in which she portrayed the role of Mallika with Pran. A very popular song "Chhota Sa Ghar Hoga..." from the film Naukri (1954), was also picturised on her and Kishore Kumar. She also played the role of his sister in the film. In 1955, she was offered a lead opposite Dad (Johnny Walker) in Guru Dutt's film Aar Paar (1954). "Arre Na Na Na Na Na Na Tauba Tauba..." was yet another melodious song picturized on her and Dad. In 1955 (August), she married Dad, and made the decision to end her career in the film industry so that she could dedicate her life for her family." She and Johnny Walker had 3 daughters and 3 sons, which includes son Nasirr Khan, an actor.

=== Noor's filmography ===
| Year | Film | Role | Notes |
|---|---|---|---|
| 1946 | Anmol Ghadi | young Lata | Debut film |
| 1947 | Dard | young Suraiya | |
| 1953 | Alif Laila | Malika | |
| 1953 | Do Bigha Zamin | Rani | |
| 1954 | Aar Paar | Rustom's girlfriend | Acted alongside elder sister Shakila & opposite future husband Johnny Walker |
| 1954 | Naukri | Uma Chowdhury | |
| 1955 | Shahi Chor | | Acted alongside elder sister Shakila |

== Filmography ==
| Year | Film | Role | Role |
|---|---|---|---|
| 1949 | Duniya | | First release |
| 1950 | Dastan | young Rani | First offered and enacted role |
| 1951 | Gumashta | | |
| 1952 | Khubsurat | | |
| 1952 | Rajrani Damayanti | | |
| 1952 | Saloni | | |
| 1952 | Sinbad The Sailor | | |
| 1953 | Aagosh | Rani | |
| 1953 | Arman | Roopa | |
| 1953 | Jhansi Ki Rani (Hindi & English) | young Lakshmi Bai | |
| 1953 | Madmast | | First film as a leading actress |
| 1953 | Shahenshah | Naseem | |
| 1954 | Aar Paar | Dancer | Acted alongside younger sister Noor |
| 1954 | Alibaba Aur 40 Chor | Marjina | |
| 1954 | Daan | | |
| 1954 | Gul Bahar | | |
| 1954 | Halla Gulla | | |
| 1954 | Khushboo | | |
| 1954 | Laila | | |
| 1954 | Lal Pari | | |
| 1954 | Noor Mahal | | |
| 1955 | Mast Qalandar | | |
| 1955 | Ratnamanjari | | |
| 1955 | Shahi Chor | | Acted alongside younger sister Noor |
| 1956 | C. I. D. | Rekha Mathur | |
| 1956 | Caravan | | |
| 1956 | Hatim Tai | Gulnar Pari & Husna Pari (fairies) | Double role |
| 1956 | Husn Banu | Husn Banu | |
| 1956 | Khul Ja Sim-Sim | Marjina | |
| 1956 | Malika | | |
| 1956 | Paisa Hi Paisa | Lata | |
| 1956 | Passing Show | | |
| 1956 | Roop Kumari | | |
| 1957 | Agra Road | Sarita | |
| 1957 | Alladin Leila | Marjina | |
| 1957 | Begunah | Dr. Chopra | |
| 1957 | Chamak Chandni | | |
| 1957 | Maya Nagri | | |
| 1957 | Mohini | Sundari | |
| 1957 | Naag Padmani | Chanda | |
| 1957 | Paristan alias Gulbakavali | Bakavali | |
| 1957 | Patal Pari | Hoor Banu (sea nymph) | |
| 1958 | 24 Ghante | Asha | |
| 1958 | Al-Hilal | Shahnaaz | |
| 1958 | Amar Pyar | | |
| 1958 | Hathkadi | | |
| 1958 | Post Box 999 | Neilima | |
| 1958 | Sim Sim Margina | Margina | |
| 1958 | Taxi 555 | | |
| 1959 | 40 Days | Shabnam | |
| 1959 | Doctor Z | | |
| 1959 | Guest House | Neila | |
| 1959 | Kali Topi Lal Rumal | Champa | |
| 1959 | School Master | Gita | |
| 1960 | Abdulla | Malaque | |
| 1960 | Baraat | Gori | |
| 1960 | Delhi Junction | Shobha | |
| 1960 | Dr. Shaitan | | |
| 1960 | Gambler | | |
| 1960 | Shriman Satyawadi | Gita | |
| 1961 | Do Bhai | Kasturi | |
| 1961 | Reshmi Rumal | Rekha Rai | |
| 1962 | Bagdad Ki Raaten | | |
| 1962 | China Town | Rita Rai | |
| 1962 | Naqli Nawab | Shabnam | |
| 1962 | Neeli Aankhen | Sheila | |
| 1962 | Tower House | Savita | |
| 1963 | Kahin Pyar Na Ho Jaye | Bimala | |
| 1963 | Mulzim | Asha | |
| 1963 | Shaheed Bhagat Singh | Durgawati Vohra | |
| 1963 | Ustadon Ke Ustad | Nita | Last release |
