= Mulzim =

Mulzim (lit. 'accused') may refer to these Indian films:

- Mulzim (1963 film), a Hindi-language film
- Mulzim (1988 film), a Hindi-language action film
