= Besahara =

- Directed by: B.R. Ishara
- Screenplay by: Mushtaq Jalili
- Produced by: S. Waris Ali
- Starring: Rajan Sippy; Kader Khan; Bharat Kapoor; Shashikala; Priya Tendulkar; Vidyashree
- Cinematography: Akbar Balam
- Edited by: Tara Singh
- Music by: Usha Khanna; Gauhar Kanpuri (Lyrics)
- Release date: 6 February 1987
- Running time: 135 min
- Country: India
- Language: Hindi

Besahara is a 1987 Bollywood family drama film directed by B.R. Ishara. It stars Rajan Sippy, Kader Khan, Bharat Kapoor, Shashikala, Priya Tendulkar and Vidyashree.

== Cast ==
- Rajan Sippy as Rakesh
- Vidyashree as Nanda
- Priya Tendulkar as Charu (Din Dayal's Daughter)
- Kader Khan as Nawab Rahim Khan
- Mazhar Khan as Nilesh (Din Dayal's Son)
- Shashikala as Rakesh's Mother
- Sulbha Deshpande as Nanda's Mother
- Bharat Kapoor
- Shriram Lagoo as Seth Din Dayal
- Yunus Parvez as Seth
- Vikas Anand as Police Inspector

== Soundtrack ==
1. "Dushman Hai Sab Ki Jaan Ki" - Mohammed Aziz
2. "Mujhko Raahon Pe Tum Chhodkar" - Hemlata
3. "Saajan Teri Baahon Mein" - Anuradha Paudwal
4. "Suniye Huzoor Aadmi Ki" - Vinod Sehgal
