= Chaubees Ghante =

1958 film

- Directed by: Dwarka Ghosla
- Starring: Premnath; Shakila; K. N. Singh; Maruti; Nishi; Shammi; Sheela Vaz; Kanchanmala
- Music by: Bipin Babul; Raja Mehdi Ali Khan (lyrics)
- Production company: Zar Productions
- Release date: 1958
- Country: India
- Language: Hindi

Chaubees Ghante aka 24 Ghante is a 1958 Hindi film directed by Dwarka Ghosla. It stars Premnath, Shakila, Nishi, K. N. Singh, Maruti, Shammi, Sheela Vaz, Kanchanmala. It had music by Bipin Babul and lyrics written by Raja Mehdi Ali Khan.

== Cast ==
- Prem Nath
- Shakila
- K.N. Singh
- Maruti Rao
- Shammi
- Raj Kapoor
- Nishi
- Samson

== Soundtrack ==
#	Title	Singer(s)
1	"Humein Haal-E-Dil Tumse Kehna Hain"	Talat Mahmood, Asha Bhosle
2	"Duniya Mujhko Paagal Samjhe"	Mukesh
3	"Aaj Ka Salaam Lo"	Asha Bhosle
4	"Chhan Chhan Karti Daulat"	Mohammad Rafi, Asha Bhosle
5	"Ek Dil Humare Paas Hain"	Mohammed Rafi, Asha Bhosle
6	"Haye Kisika Rangin Aanchal"	Asha Bhosle
7	"Humein Haal-E-Dil Tumse Kehna Hain"	Talat Mahmood
8	"Jawani Jalake Bedardi Raah"	Shamshad Begum, Asha Bhosle
9	"Nigahein Milake Huyi Main Deewani"	Asha Bhosle
