= Shehzaade =

- Promotional Poster
- Directed by: Raj N. Sippy
- Produced by: Rajan Sippy
- Starring: Dharmendra; Shatrughan Sinha; Jaya Prada; Moushumi Chatterjee; Dimple Kapadia; Kimi Katkar; Dara Singh; Danny Denzongpa; Vinod Mehra
- Music by: Laxmikant–Pyarelal
- Release date: 20 October 1989
- Running time: 135 minutes
- Country: India
- Language: Hindi

Shehzaade (transl. Princes) is a 1989 Indian Hindi-language action drama film directed by Raj N.Sippy. The film stars Dharmendra, Shatrughan Sinha, Jaya Prada, Moushumi Chatterjee, Dimple Kapadia, Kimi Katkar, Dara Singh, Danny Denzongpa and Vinod Mehra.

Shehzaade released worldwide on 20 October 1989, coinciding with the Diwali weekend. The film underperformed at the box office.

== Plot ==
Suraj Singh (Shatrughan Sinha) lives with his widowed mother Padmini (Moushumi) in a small hut in a Bombay city slum. He cannot stand injustice in any form, and this places him in the bad books of Police Inspector Shankar (Dharmendra). One day Suraj comes across an older man Zorawar (Dharmendra in a double role) and brings him home. What Suraj does not know is that Zorawar is a former jailbird, who has completed his sentence, for multiple murders and alleged rape of a woman named Gauri (Jayaprada). Although Gauri is no longer alive, the vow to avenge her rape and death is kept alive by her Police Inspector brother (Vinod Mehra). To complicate matters further, Suraj finds out that his mother is having an affair with Zorawar. What does Suraj do under these circumstances?

== Cast ==
Actor	Character in the movie	Notes
Dharmendra	Subedhar Zorawar Singh/Inspector Shankar	Double role (father/son)
Shatrughan Sinha	Suraj Singh	Zorawar's other son
Jaya Prada	Gauri	Shankar's Mother
Moushumi Chatterjee	Padmini Singh	Suraj's Mother
Dimple Kapadia	Aarti	Shankar's Love Interest
Vinod Mehra	Inspector Shankar Shrivastav	Gauri's Brother
Kimi Katkar	Bijli	Suraj's Love Interest
Danny Denzongpa	Thakur Rai Bahadur Roshan Singh	Main Antagonist
Dara Singh	Jailor Gujral	Shankar's Mentor
Joginder	Thakur Hakim Singh	Roshan Singh's Cousin
Surendra Pal	Thakur Laakhan Singh	Roshan Singh's Cousin
Puneet Issar	Arjun Singh	Roshan Singh's Son
Dan Dhanoa	Thakur Naresh Singh	Roshan Singh's Son
Mahesh Anand	Thakur Shakti Singh	Roshan Singh's Son
Tej Sapru	Thakur Pratap Singh	Roshan Singh's Son
Sharat Saxena	Bheema	Roshan Singh's Henchman
Jack Gaud	Jai	
Bob Christo	Bob	
Praveen Kumar	Pehalwaan Raka	Street Gambler
Vikas Anand	Police Chief Mohan	—
Sudhir Dalvi	Pujari Kaka Raja	Temple's Priest
Ahmed Khan	The Judge AK Singh	
Ram Mohan	Sarpanch Ram Singh	Aarti's Father
Shammi	Bandini, Zorawar's mother	
Subbiraj	Shaanti Bhaai	
Tun Tun	Hitler's Bride	Cameo
Sameer Khakhar	Satpal, Suraj's friend	
Mehmood Jr.	Iqbal , Suraj's Friend	
Paintal	Vinay Verma, Suraj's friend	
Ghanshyam Rohera	Akash Khanna, Suraj's friend	
Master Maruf khan	Child actor Shankar	in song with Gauri

== Soundtrack ==
Lyrics: Anand Bakshi

#	Title	Singer(s)
1	"Shehzaade"	Dharmendra, Shatrughan Sinha
2	"Main Hoon Tere Naam Ki Chitthi"	Anuradha Paudwal
3	"Dheere Dheere Howle Howle"	Kavita Krishnamurthy
4	"Ek Chhora Ek Chhori"	Shabbir Kumar, Amit Kumar, Alka Yagnik, Kavita Krishnamurthy
5	"Mere Munne Tujhko Ye Kissa" (part 1)	Anuradha Paudwal
6	"Mere Munne Tujhko Ye Kissa" (part 2)	Anuradha Paudwal
