= Tower House (film) =

- Poster
- Directed by: Nisar Ahmad Ansari
- Produced by: J.C. Malhotra
- Starring: Ajit; Shakila
- Cinematography: Keki Mistry
- Music by: Ravi
- Release date: 1962
- Running time: 180 minutes
- Country: India
- Language: Hindi

Tower House is a 1962 Indian Hindi language thriller film produced by J.C. Malhotra and directed by Nisar Ahmad Ansari.

== Cast ==
- Ajit as Suresh Kumar
- Shakila as Savita
- N.A.Ansari as Ranjeet
- S.N.Bannerji as Seth Durgadas
- Pratima Devi as Suresh's Mother
- Nilofer
- Rajan Kapoor
- Nazima
- Lotan
- Raj Rani
- Champak
- Shukla
- Madhu Mati
- Bhagwan as Ajay

== Soundtrack ==
The music of the film was composed by Ravi and songs penned by Asad Bhopali and S. H. Bihari.

Song	Singer
"Main Khushnaseeb Hoon" (Duet)	Lata Mangeshkar, Mukesh
"Main Khushnaseeb Hoon" (Solo)	Lata Mangeshkar
"Ae Mere Dil-E-Nadaan"	Lata Mangeshkar
"Mausam Hai Jawan"	Asha Bhosle
"Yeh Sitam Kya Hai"	Asha Bhosle
"Zara Bachke"	Asha Bhosle
