= Abdulla (1960 film) =

1960 film

Abdulla is a 1960 Hindi-language fantasy drama film produced by Amrit Singh and directed by Akkoo under the banner of Parbat Films. It stars Mahipal, Helen and Shakila in lead roles. The music was composed by Bulo C Rani. The screenplay is based on a story written by Sheven Rizvi.

== Plot ==
Abdulla is a smart and brave young man. With his qualities, he manages to defeat the greatest warrior of the Yemen empire Aquirab. His bravery was awarded with the title of the commander in chief of the Arab empire by the king. Mahipal falls in love with the princess of the empire, Malaque. The king loses his eyesight before their marriage. As the commander in chief, Mahipal sets out to bring a precious stone that is believed to cure blindness. Mahipal faces many challenges on his journey to find the precious stone named "Lal Yemen". The moment Mahipal touches the stone, he becomes paralysed, and his appearance becomes grotesque. Ashamed of his body, Mahipal decides to live the rest of his life in the forest alone. Meanwhile, cruel Aquirab occupies the kingdom. The Princess flees from the palace in search of Mahipal. Later she finds Mahipal, and the kingdom is saved.

== Cast ==
- Mahipal as Abdulla
- Shakila as Malaque
- Harilal as Aquirab
- Ajit
- Tun Tun
- Gollapudi Maruti Rao
- Helen

== Soundtrack ==
The music was composed by Bulo C. Rani, with lyrics by Sheven Rizvi.

=== Songs ===
- "Ae Momino Suno Ye Kahani Namaaz Ki" - Mukesh
- "Le Le Rab Ka Naam O Gafi" - Mohammed Rafi
- "Mange Se Jo Naam Mil Jaati" - Talat Mahmood
- "Chan Cham Payal Bole" - Asha Bhosle
- "Chand Ka Teeka Pad Gaya Pheeka" - Asha Bhosle
- "Khamosh Nazaare Hai Pheeka" - Asha Bhosle
- "Mere Aaka Mera Dub Gaya Hai Safina"
- "O Guyiya Aate Hi Honge Saiya"
