= Amba (film) =

1990 film directed by Mohan Kumar

- Directed by: Mohan Kumar
- Produced by: Mohan Kumar
- Starring: Anil Kapoor; Meenakshi Seshadri; Shabana Azmi
- Cinematography: K.K. Mahajan
- Music by: Laxmikant–Pyarelal
- Release date: 10 August 1990 (India)
- Running time: 161 min.
- Country: India
- Language: Hindi

Amba is a 1990 Indian Bollywood film produced and directed by Mohan Kumar. It stars Anil Kapoor, Meenakshi Seshadri, Kiran Juneja, and Shabana Azmi in the title role as Amba.

== Plot ==
Prabha lives a wealthy lifestyle with her widowed father Thakur Jasbir Singh and her brother Kunwar Ranvir. She receives a marriage proposal from equally wealthy Thakur Shamsher Singh but immediately rejects him and marries Rajendra. Prabha re-locates to move in with him, his widowed and principled mother, Amba Bhanupratap Singh, and his wayward brother, Suraj. Prabha soon gives birth to Rajat. Rajendra, who secretly visits local courtesan Munnibai, returns home intoxicated one night and sexually molests and then kills Geeta, who is their servant, Bhiku's daughter, but is treated like a family member. Then, when Amba returns home after watching Ram Leela, she apprehends Rajendra and has him arrested; he is eventually tried in court, found guilty after Amba's testimony, and hanged. A devastated and humiliated Prabha swears to avenge his death and leaves to live with her equally vengeful dad and brother, and together they plot to turn Amba and Suraj's lives upside down - so much so that Amba and Suraj not only lose their ancestral estate, their house is burned down, they are blacklisted by the community, where Amba is the Sarpanch, and to top it all up, Suraj is arrested for killing Shamsher and sexually molesting Prabha, and if found guilty will also be hanged like his brother.

== Cast ==
- Shabana Azmi as Amba Bhanupratap Singh, mother of Suraj
- Anil Kapoor as Suraj "Sarju" B. Singh
- Meenakshi Seshadri as Lajjo
- Kanwaljit Singh as Rajendra 'Raja' B. Singh
- Kiran Juneja as Prabha R. Singh
- Rajan Sippy as Kunwar Ranvir J. Singh, Brother of Prabha
- Mangal Dhillon as Thakur Shamsher Singh
- Sudhir Pandey as Thakur Jasbir Singh, Father of Prabha
- Sujit Kumar as Bhiku, servant
- Satish Shah as Neelkanth
- Yunus Parvez as Banne Miya
- Upasana Singh as Munnibai
- Shivraj as Gurghand
- Dulari as Naanima
- Ram Mohan as Judge
- Jaya Mathur as Geeta Yadav
- Birbal as Amba's supporter
- Kamaldeep as Police Inspector

== Soundtrack ==
Anand Bakshi penned the lyrics. The soundtrack includes the following songs:

#	Title	Singer(s)
1	"Aurat Zaat Mard Se Jhagda"	Kishore Kumar
2	"Sheron Wali Mata Ka Jab Naam"	Suresh Wadkar, Kavita Krishnamurthy
3	"Maa Ka Man Mamta Ka Mandir"	Mohammed Aziz, Anuradha Paudwal
4	"Ek Swarg Hai Aasman Par"	Suresh Wadkar, Mohammed Aziz, Kavita Krishnamurthy, Anuradha Paudwal
5	"Laga Ragda To Mit Gaya Jhagda"	Mohammed Aziz, Alka Yagnik
6	"Sun Meri Shehzadi"	Mohammed Aziz, Alka Yagnik

== Reception ==
Bob Chinn of Cult Movies magazine wrote in 2003, "While this is obviously a star vehicle for Azmi, one must remember that there are stars and there are actresses. Shabana Azmi is that rare combination of both." Sukanya Verma of Rediff.com, however, criticised Azmi's choice of the part as "strange" and further writing, "The film shamelessly tries to fit in the Mother India mould dumbing down Azmi’s fiery brilliance to a cringe-worthy stereotype that’s as bearable as the tacky silver wig on her head".
