= Alif Laila (1953 film) =

1953 film

- Directed by: K. Amarnath
- Produced by: K. Amarnath
- Starring: Nimmi, Asha Mathur, Vijay Kumar, Pran, Murad, Amrit Rana, Maya Devi, Gope
- Music by: Shyam Sundar
- Release date: 1953
- Country: India
- Language: Hindi

Alif Laila (The One Thousand and One Nights) is a 1953 Bollywood fantasy drama film produced and directed by K. Amarnath. It is an adaptation of the Middle Eastern folktale collection One Thousand and One Nights.

== Cast ==
- Nimmi as Genie
- Asha Mathur as Princess
- Vijay Kumar as Aladin
- Pran
- Murad
- Amrit Rana
- Maya Devi
- Gope as Rasheed
- Helen as Dancer

== Music ==
All lyrics were penned by Sahir Ludhianvi and music was composed by Shyam Sundar.

1. "Bahaar Aayi Khili Kaliyan" - Lata Mangeshkar
2. "Dilon Ke Shikar Ko" - Asha Bhosle
3. "Dilon Ko Dard Bananewaale" - Lata Mangeshkar
4. "Khamosh Kyun Ho" - Lata Mangeshkar, Mohammed Rafi
5. "Khada Hoon Der Se" - Talat Mahmood
6. "Kya Raat Suhani Hai" - Lata Mangeshkar, Mohammed Rafi
7. "Mere Nagmon Mein Un Mastana" - Talat Mahmood
8. "Raaten Pyaar Ki Beet Jaayengi" - Asha Bhosle
