= Pighalta Aasman =

- Film poster
- Directed by: Shammi
- Written by: Moin-ud-din (story, screenplay, dialogues)
- Produced by: Shammi
- Starring: Shashi Kapoor; Raakhee; Rati Agnihotri
- Cinematography: Russi Billimoria
- Edited by: A. R. Rajendran
- Music by: Kalyanji-Anandji
- Production company: UA Films
- Release date: 1 March 1985
- Running time: 2 hours 35 min
- Country: India
- Language: Hindi

Pighalta Aasman is a 1985 Indian Hindi-language film produced and directed by Shammi. It stars Shashi Kapoor, Raakhee, Rati Agnihotri in pivotal roles.

== Story ==
Delhi-based businesswoman Aarti Singh Rathod lives a wealthy lifestyle along with Nanny, Suku, and friend and employee, Anuradha. She decides to travel to Kashmir and take possession of a piece of her land that is being occupied by Suraj Arora. Her Nanny tells her she was brought up by the Arora family until her dad, Karan Singh, became wealthy and broke off all relations with them. Once in Kashmir, all differences are forgotten and both Suraj and Arti fall in love with each other. Arti's life will soon change after she finds out that Anuradha, too, has fallen in love with Suraj, and this discovery will not only create complications and competitiveness between the two women, but also change everyone's lives forever.

== Cast ==
- Shashi Kapoor as Suraj Arora / Prakash Arora
- Raakhee as Aarti Singh Rathod
- Rati Agnihotri as Anuradha "Anu"
- Deven Verma as Badal
- A.K. Hangal as Masterji
- Leela Mishra as Suku
- Sudhir Pandey as Lala Karan Singh Rathod
- Master Ravi...Bansi
- Sushma Seth as Karuna Arora
- Sunder Taneja...Tiwari

== Soundtrack ==
Lyrics provided by Indeevar, Maya Govind, Ila Arun and Anjaan.

Song	Singer
"Teri Meri Prem Kahani"	Kishore Kumar, Alka Yagnik
"Humse Na Sahi"	Alka Yagnik, Sadhana Sargam
"Humse Na Sahi" (Male)	Manhar Udhas
"Jab Yeh Dil Ho Jawan"	Alka Yagnik, Sadhana Sargam
"Jiya Nahin Lage"	Sadhana Sargam
"Mujhe Aisa Mila Moti"	Lata Mangeshkar
