= Aar Paar =

- Poster
- Directed by: Guru Dutt
- Written by: Abrar Alvi (dialogues)
- Screenplay by: Nabendu Ghosh
- Produced by: Guru Dutt
- Starring: Guru Dutt; Shyama; Shakila
- Cinematography: V. K. Murthy
- Edited by: Y. G. Chawhan
- Music by: O. P. Nayyar
- Production company: Guru Dutt Productions
- Release date: 1954
- Country: India
- Language: Hindi

Aar Paar (transl. This or That) is a 1954 Indian Hindi-language noir comedy film. Directed by Guru Dutt, it has music by O.P. Nayyar and lyrics by Majrooh Sultanpuri. Aar-Paar stars Johnny Walker, Shyama, Shakila, Jagdeep, Jagdish Sethi. Raj Khosla and Atma Ram, Guru Dutt's brother assisted Guru Dutt in film direction.

The film had very popular music. The album of the film was ranked #34 in the list of "Best Bollywood Albums of all time" by Film Companion. It was also named the "Best Album of Golden Era" for the year 1954 in the 7th Mirchi Music Awards, 2014.

== Plot ==
Kalu is a migrant taxi-driver in Bombay. He has two women who love him and would like to marry him. Kalu first wants to establish himself and become rich, before he can even think of marriage.

== Cast ==
- Guru Dutt as Kalu Birju
- Shyama as Nikki
- Shakila as Dancer
- Johny Walker as Rustam
- Jagdeep as Elaichi Sandow
- Jagdish Sethi as Lalaji, Nikki's father
- Bir Sakhuja as Captain
- V. K. Murthy as Jailor Saxena
- Kumkum as a labourer (in song "Kabhi Aar Kabhi Paar"; uncredited)
- Noor as Rustam's Girlfriend (Uncredited)
- Tun Tun as Rustam's Girlfriend's Mother (Uncredited)
- Asokan (tamil actor) in 'mohabath Karlo song scene

== Songs ==
All songs were composed by O. P. Nayyar with lyrics by Majrooh Sultanpuri.

| Song | Singer | Raga |
|---|---|---|
| "Mohabbat Kar Lo, Ji Bhar Lo, Aji Kisne Roka Hai" | Mohammed Rafi, Geeta Dutt | |
| "Arey, Na Na Na, Na Na Na, Tauba Tauba, Main Na Pyar Karungi" | Mohammed Rafi, Geeta Dutt | |
| "Sun Sun, Sun Sun Zalima, Pyar Humko Tumse Ho Gaya" | Mohammed Rafi, Geeta Dutt | |
| "Ja Ja Ja Ja Bewafa" | Geeta Dutt | |
| "Babuji Dheere Chalna" | Geeta Dutt | |
| "Ye Lo Main Haari Piya" | Geeta Dutt | |
| "Hoon Abhi Main Jawan" | Geeta Dutt | |
| "Kabhi Aar, Kabhi Paar" | Shamshad Begum | Pilu |

== Reception ==
Samira Sood (2020), writing in ThePrint, states "the beauty of Aar Paar's dialogue is that every character speaks in a language that reflects where they're from, their upbringing and education. Instead of one-size-fits-all Hindi, there's a bit of Punjabi, a bit of Parsi, inflections of Urdu, a smattering of street Bambaiyya, some heartland Hindi mixed with clumsy English. That attention to detail not only made the dialogue more authentic to the character, but also to the city of Bombay, long known for its cosmopolitan population."

== Trivia ==
Actress Noor played Johny Walker's girlfriend in this movie. In real life, she was Shakila's sister and wife of Johny Walker.

== In popular culture ==
Kabhi Aar Kabhi Paar was sampled by Raghav in Can't Get Enough from his debut album Storyteller (2004).
