= Rajan Sippy =

Indian actor and producer

- Occupations: Former Film actor, former film producer, and businessman
- Years active: 1984 - 1993
- Spouse: Anita Sippy
- Website: www.moghulroomdubai.com

Rajan Sippy (Hindi: राजन सिप्पी) is an Indian businessman and former actor, and former film producer who acted in several films in the 1980s and also produced the film Shehzaade (1989). He is currently a businessman in Dubai and runs several business ventures there.

== Life and career ==
Rajan Sippy earned Bachelor of Commerce degree in Accounting, Business and Economics from H.R. College of Commerce and Economics. Sippy began his acting career in the Ramsay Horror 3D film 3D Saamri (1985) and also played a horror role in their next chiller Dak Bangla (1987). He also played Madhuri Dixit's hero in the film Awara Baap (1985). He turned to production and produced a movie called Shehzaade (1989), starring Shatrughan Sinha, Dharmendra and Dimple Kapadia. In the 1990s, Rajan Sippy shifted to Dubai.

Today, he is one of the most successful Indian entrepreneurs there, with a chain of hotels and night clubs. Sippy is the founder and managing partner of S E International LLCS. He serves as the managing director of Screenplay Services Pte Ltd, which is based in Singapore. He is also the founder of Sippys Investments Limited. He is also the owner of Screenplay FZ LLC. He has even employed former Bollywood actresses like Kalpana Iyer and Sonika Gill as managers in his popular restaurant "The Moghul Room" which has now shut down.

== Filmography ==
=== Hindi ===
Year	Film	Role	Notes	Co–Star
1985	Pyaase Honth	Rajen	Supporting Role	
1985	Saamri	Sandeep	Lead Role	Aarti Gupta
1985	Awara Baap	Vijay Gupta	Supporting Role	Madhuri Dixit
1986	Kaanch Ki Deewar	Rajesh Singh	Supporting Role	
1987	Be-Sahara	Rakesh Awasthi	Lead Role	Priya Tendulkar

- Dak Bangla – 1987
- Anjaam – 1987
- Woh Din Aayega – 1987
- Patton Ki Bazi – 1986
- Shoorveer- 1988
- Aakhri Muqabla – 1988
- Shehzaade – 1989
- Amba - 1990
- Zakhmo Ka Hisaab - 1993

=== Sindhi ===
Year	Film	Role	Notes	Co–Star
1984	Hal Ta Bhajee Haloon			

== Unreleased Films ==
=== Hindi ===
Year	Film	Role	Notes	Co–Star
1985	I Love You			Sahila Chaddha
