= Kudiyirundha Koyil =

1968 film by K. Shankar

- Theatrical release poster
- Directed by: K. Shankar
- Screenplay by: Swornam
- Based on: China Town
- Produced by: T. S. Raja Sunderasan
- Starring: M. G. Ramachandran; Jayalalithaa; Rajasree
- Cinematography: V. Ramamoorthy
- Edited by: K. Shankar; K. Narayanan
- Music by: M. S. Viswanathan
- Production company: Saravana Screens
- Release date: 15 March 1968
- Running time: 166 minutes
- Country: India
- Language: Tamil

Kudiyirundha Koyil (transl. The Temple where I resided) is a 1968 Indian Tamil-language spy film directed by K. Shankar. The film stars M. G. Ramachandran, Jayalalithaa and Rajasree, with L. Vijayalakshmi, Pandari Bai, M. N. Nambiar, Sundarrajan, V. K. Ramasamy, S. V. Ramadas and Nagesh in supporting roles. A remake of the 1962 Hindi film China Town, it revolves around twins who become separated as children: one grows up as a criminal, and the other is tasked with apprehending him.

Kudiyirundha Koyil was released on 15 March 1968. It was a box office success, ran for more than 100 days in theatres, and became a turning point in Ramachandran's career. For his performance, he won his first Tamil Nadu State Film Award for Best Actor.

== Plot ==
Twins Sekhar and Anand and their mother, Mangalam, witness their father Ramnadhan being murdered by Nagappan, an escaped convict who Ramnadhan had testified against. The family has to leave for Madras to pursue a new life. But when Sekhar gets down from the train to fetch some water, it leaves without him. Nagappan kidnaps Sekhar, and raises him as a criminal. Sekhar remains unaware that the same man had killed his father.

Years later, Sekhar who now calls himself "Babu", is an established criminal and the most wanted man in the city. Meanwhile, Anand is a club-dancer; neither he nor Babu are aware of each other's existence. During a police encounter, Babu is grievously wounded and seeks shelter in Mangalam's house, although he does not recognise her as his mother. He develops a soft corner for her, but when Nagappan (now known as Boopathy, the owner of a cabaret and employer of Babu) learns about this, he tries to eradicate the kind-self out of Babu.

During another police encounter, Babu is again wounded, but becomes insane this time, also becoming amnesiac. D. I. G. Mogan comes across Anand, and after seeing the striking resemblance between him and Babu, advises him to act as Babu to infiltrate the gang and have them arrested. Anand agrees, but later realises Babu is his brother. Anand's girlfriend Jaya sees him having lot of money in a briefcase, and the police chase him. Unaware of the truth, she thinks he has turned into a criminal, and refuses to speak to him. Mangalam also learns of this, and becomes heartbroken. However, Mangalam and Jaya soon reconcile with Anand after learning of the truth, and they also learn that Babu is his brother.

Babu's girlfriend Asha discovers that Anand is impersonating Babu, but he surrenders to her and explains about Babu's medical condition, subsequently revealing himself as Babu's brother. Asha forgives him and the duo subsequently team up to defeat Nagappan and his men. Babu later escapes from the prison to kill Anand when learning about him, but is cornered by Jaya, who tells him that Anand is his brother. Babu does not believe this, and kidnaps Jaya. He is later stopped by Mangalam, who makes him realise that he is her son and Anand is his brother. Remembering that Nagappan killed his father, he teams up with Anand to defeat Nagappan, who is later arrested. Subsequently, Babu returns to being "Sekhar", and reunites with his family.

== Cast ==
- M. G. Ramachandran as Anand and Sekhar/Babu
  - Master Sekhar as young Anand and Sekhar
- Jayalalithaa as Jaya
- Rajasree as Asha
- L. Vijayalakshmi (special appearance in the song "Aadaludan Paadalai")
- Pandari Bai as Mangalam
- M. N. Nambiar as Boopathy/Nagappan
- Sundarrajan as D. I. G. Mogan
- V. K. Ramasamy as Rao Bahadur Singaram
- S. V. Ramadas as Ramnadhan
- Nagesh as Jaya's elder brother

== Production ==
Kudiyirundha Koyil is a remake of the 1962 Hindi film China Town, and was initially titled Sangamam. It was the first Tamil film to feature a Bangra dance sequence in the song "Aadaludan Paadalai". Ramachandran had to practice for one month to dance in the song, which was shot over the course of three days. In portraying Sekhar/Babu, Ramachandran applied make-up to give the character a dark complexion, while he kept his original fair-skinned complexion for portraying Anand.

== Soundtrack ==
The soundtrack was composed by M. S. Viswanathan. The song "Thulluvadho Ilamai" belongs to Pasodoble, a Spanish musical genre, and is also set to Mayamalavagowla, a Carnatic raga. "Kunguma Pottin Mangalam" was the only film song written by Roshanara Begum in her life. "Naan Yaar? Nee Yaar?" earned Pulamaipithan recognition as a lyricist. The interlude from "Aadaludan Paadalai" was re-used in the song "Namma Kattula" from Pattiyal (2006) and the Kannada film Nannusire (2008) by Premgi Amaren. The song "Ennai Theriyuma" was later remixed by Achu for a film with the same name, "Aadaludan Paadalai", which is set in Sindhu Bhairavi, was remixed by Amresh Ganesh for Motta Shiva Ketta Shiva (2017).

Track listing
No.	Title	Lyrics	Singer(s)	Length
1.	"Un Vizhiyum En Vaalum"	Vaali	T. M. Soundararajan, L. R. Eswari	3:17
2.	"Ennai Theriyuma"	Vaali	T. M. Soundararajan, Chorus	3:38
3.	"Neeyethan Enakku"	Vaali	T. M. Soundararajan, P. Susheela	3:35
4.	"Naan Yaar? Nee Yaar?"	Pulamaipithan	T. M. Soundararajan	3:19
5.	"Thuluvadho Ilamai"	Vaali	T. M. Soundararajan, L. R. Eswari, Chorus	3:37
6.	"Aadaludan Paadalai"	Alangudi Somu	T. M. Soundararajan, P. Susheela	6:07
7.	"Kunguma Pottin Mangalam"	Roshanara Begum	T. M. Soundararajan, P. Susheela	3:42
8.	"Thaaiyai (Kovilum Deivam)"		M. S. Viswanathan	0:32
Total length:				27:47

== Release and reception ==
Kudiyirundha Koyil was released on 15 March 1968. Kalki positively reviewed the film, comparing it favourably to earlier Ramachandran films featuring him in dual roles. Dinamani praised Ramachandran's performance in Sekhar's role. The film was a box office success, and ran more than 100 days in theatres. Ramachandran considered it the tenth turning point in his career. For his performance, Ramachandran won his first Tamil Nadu State Film Award for Best Actor. At the same ceremony, T. M. Soundararajan won the award for Best Male Playback Singer.

== Bibliography ==
- Sundararaman (2007) [2005]. Raga Chintamani: A Guide to Carnatic Ragas Through Tamil Film Music (2nd ed.). Pichhamal Chintamani. OCLC 295034757.
