= Patton Ki Bazi =

- Promotional Poster
- Directed by: Ram Govind
- Produced by: Amarlal P.Chhabria; Mrs.K.M.Chhabria; M.P.Chhabria
- Starring: Rajan Sippy; Khushboo; Swapna; Bharat Kapoor; Ramesh Tiwari
- Edited by: Narender Arora
- Music by: Anup Jalota
- Release date: 1986
- Running time: 135 minutes
- Country: India
- Language: Hindi

Patton Ki Bazi is a 1986 Indian Hindi-language film directed by Ram Govind for Balaji Films, starring Rajan Sippy, Khushboo, Swapna and Gulshan Grover.

== Plot ==
Patton Ki Bazi is an action film. The plot includes Mahesh (Rajan Sippy) who comes to Mumbai and falls in love with Preet(Khushboo) who is Seth Oberoi's daughter. Mahesh is good at playing cards and soon he becomes the biggest gambler of the city.

== Cast ==
- Rajan Sippy as Mahesh Prasad
- Khushboo as Preet Oberoi
- Swapna as Mona
- Vinod Mehra as Inspector Vinod Saxena
- Gulshan Grover as Ranjeet
- Bharat Kapoor as Balwant Sethi 'Billa'

== Songs ==
Lyrics: Maya Govind

Song	Singer
"Nahin Door Manzil"	Kishore Kumar
"Jalta Hai Yeh Badan"	Asha Bhosle
"Mera Sajna Mujhe Mil Gaya"	Asha Bhosle
"Mora Saiyan Na Pakde Baiyan"	Asha Bhosle, Udit Narayan
"Aaja Re Aaja Tu Aaja"	Asha Bhosle, Anup Jalota
"Kanhaiya Tu Naiya Ko Paar Lagade"	Asha Bhosle, Anup Jalota
"Chhum Chhananan Payal More Bole"	Asha Bhosle, Anup Jalota
"Aakhri Baar Tere Husn Ko"	Anup Jalota
