= Shaheed Bhagat Singh (film) =

- Directed by: K. N. Bansal
- Produced by: K. N. Bansal
- Starring: Shammi Kapoor; Prem Nath; Shakila; Sapru
- Music by: Husnlal Bhagatram
- Production company: K. N. Films
- Release date: 1963
- Running time: 120 minutes
- Country: India
- Language: Hindi

Shaheed Bhagat Singh is a Hindi biographical action film directed and produced by K. N. Bansal based on the life of Bhagat Singh, the great Indian revolutionary. Shammi Kapoor played the titular role and Prem Nath, Shakila, D. K. Sapru are other supporting roles. This film was released in 1963 under the banner of K. N. Films.

== Plot ==
The film revolves with the early life and later role of Bhagat Singh in Indian independence movement. It also portrays his association with the Hindustan Socialist Republican Association, and their subsequent martyrdom along with other comrades.

== Cast ==
- Shammi Kapoor as Bhagat Singh
- Prem Nath as Chandrasekhar Azad
- Shakila as Durgawati Devi
- D. K. Sapru as Ram Prasad Bismil
- Achala Sachdev
- Vijay Kumar as Bhagwati Charan Vohra
- Ulhas
