= Zakhmo Ka Hisaab =

Zakhmo Ka Hisaab ज़ख्मो का हिसाब
- Promotional Poster
- Directed by: Talukdars
- Produced by: Talukdars
- Starring: Govinda; Farah
- Cinematography: Munir Khan
- Edited by: Hussain A. Burmawala
- Music by: Rajesh Roshan
- Release date: 20 August 1993
- Country: India
- Language: Hindi

Zakhmo Ka Hisaab is a 1993 Indian Hindi-language film produced and directed by Talukdars. It stars Govinda, Farah in pivotal roles.

== Plot ==
Suraj (Govinda) lives with his parents viz, dad (Alok Nath), mom Savitri (Seema Deo), sister Pooja (Parijat), elder brother Amar, his sister-in-law, and a niece and nephew. Amar is employed in the Persian gulf and sends some money so that the family can find a suitable groom for Pooja. When Suraj goes to deposit the money in the bank, some bank robbers intercept him and take his money. Since the money was not deposited in the bank, the bank is unable to guarantee the amount. Suraj does not share this info with his family, so that they needn't worry. Suraj goes in search of the culprits and meets up with a petty thief and pick-pocket Bindiya (Farha). He feels sorry for her, and takes her home and introduces her to his family, and promises to marry her. His family accepts Bindiya. When the family hear of Amar dying, they ask Suraj to get the money from the bank. How will Suraj get money from the bank, when there is no money in there? How will the knowledge that the money was stolen effect his family? Will Pooja ever get married?

== Cast ==
- Govinda as Suraj
- Farah as Bindiya
- Kader Khan as Gyani
- Aruna Irani as Kamini
- Aloknath as Kailashnath
- Seema Deo as Savitri
- Adi Irani as Inspector Avinash
- Kiran Kumar as Dhaneshwar Choudhary
- Vikram Gokhale as Professor Adarsh Kumar
- Rajan Sippy as Amarnath
- Rakesh Bedi as Kaushik ,Gyani's Assistant
- Dinesh Hingoo as Malhotra
- Mahavir Shah as Arvind Choudhry , Dhaneshwar's son

== Music ==
Anwar Sagar wrote all the songs.

Song	Singer
"Pehle Aap Kaha, Phir Tum Kaha, Phir Tu Pe Aa Gaye"	Asha Bhosle, Mohammed Aziz
"Hero Chacha, Hero Chacha"	Amit Kumar
"Jeene Ke Liye" (Female)	Anuradha Paudwal
"Jeene Ke Liye" (Male)	Kumar Sanu
"Aanewala Kal Ka Suraj"	Kumar Sanu
"Ek Raaz Hai Mere Seene Mein, Jo Khul Gaya Yaaron"	Alka Yagnik, Mangal Singh
