= China Town (1962 film) =

1962 film

- Directed by: Shakti Samanta
- Written by: Ranjan Bose; Vrajendra Gaur; Salil Sen Gupta
- Produced by: Shakti Samanta
- Starring: Shammi Kapoor; Shakila; Helen
- Cinematography: Dwarka Divecha
- Edited by: Dharamvir
- Music by: Ravi
- Release date: 5 October 1962
- Running time: 139 minutes
- Country: India
- Language: Hindi

China Town is a 1962 Indian Hindi-language romantic comedy thriller film directed and produced by Shakti Samanta. Written by Ranjan Bose and with music by Ravi. It is a black-and-white movie, starring Shammi Kapoor in a double role, as a gangster and his look-alike. Shakila is the leading lady, alongside Helen in a supporting role. The film was remade in Tamil as Kudiyirundha Koyil (1968), starring M. G. Ramachandran and in Telugu as Bhale Thammudu (1969), starring N. T. Rama Rao. Prem Nazir 1981 Malayalam movie Theekkali was also loosely based on this movie.

== Plot ==
Shekhar (Shammi Kapoor), a young singer, lives in Darjeeling with his widowed mother. He is in love with Rita (Shakila), the only daughter of the wealthy Rai Bahadur Digamberprasad Rai. Rai does not approve of Shekhar and wants his daughter to marry a wealthy Calcutta-based businessman named Chowdhry. Rita asks Shekhar to get a better position, but Shekhar is quite satisfied with his singing career. So Rita and her father relocate to Calcutta, and Shekhar follows them. An enraged Rai complains to the police, who arrest Shekhar and hold him for questioning. However, the police notice his resemblance to a China Town gangster named Mike (also played by Shammi Kapoor), who they are holding in custody. Because Mike refuses to talk, the police convince Shekhar to impersonate him in order to infiltrate the Chinatown criminal ring. Meanwhile, Shekhar's mother reveals to him that Mike may be his long-lost brother Shankar, kidnapped by gangsters as a boy. Shekhar accordingly takes over Mike's life, but there is one thing he and the police overlooked – namely Mike – who escapes from police custody with the help of Rita, who mistakes him for Shekhar. Mike's girlfriend Suzy (Helen) finds out Shekhar's true identity, but spares him when he reveals that Mike is alive and captured by the police, and sympathizes with him after learning that Mike was his long-lost brother. The gangsters overhear this and capture Shekhar, his life is only spared after he tells Mike his true background and the two brothers capture the gang's leader. As a result, Shekhar gets a permanent police job that allows him to marry Rita and Mike receives a reduced sentence of three years.

== Cast ==
- Shammi Kapoor as Shekhar and Shankar alias Mike (Double Role)
- Shakila as Rita Rai
- Helen as Suzy
- Madan Puri as Joseph Wong
- S. N. Banerjee as Rai Bahadur Digamberprasad Rai
- Kanu Roy as Sr.Inspector Datta
- Mridula Rani as Shekhar and Shankar's Mother
- Rashid Khan as Sundaram (Mahakali's Husband)
- M.B. Shetty as Ching Lee
- Keshav Rana as Usman
- Tun Tun as Mahakali (Hotel Landlady)
- Gautam Mukherjee
- Samson
- Keshto Mukherjee as Keshto(Uncredited)
- Suvojit Saha As Pagla Mao
- Jeevan Kala as Shanti
- Polson as Bholu
- Sujit Kumar as Inspector in Calcutta

== Soundtrack ==
The movie soundtrack didn't have a grand impact on the Indian Populace, but select songs from the albums were declared hits and a track by the name of "Baar Baar Dekho" by Mohammed Rafi went on to become a classic, which is remembered and hummed still to date. The music of the film was by Ravi and the lyrics were penned by veteran Majrooh Sultanpuri. Almost all the songs were rendered by Mohammed Rafi and Asha Bhosle.

Song	Singer
"Baar Baar Dekho"	Mohammed Rafi
"Dekho Ji Ek Bala Jogi Matwala"	Mohammed Rafi, Minoo Purshottam
"Bada Qatil Hai Mera Yaar, China Chin Chin Chu"	Mohammed Rafi, Asha Bhosle
"Yeh Rang Na Chhutega, Ulfat Ki Nishani Hai"	Mohammed Rafi, Asha Bhosle
"Humse Na Poochho Hum Kahan Chale"	Mohammed Rafi, Asha Bhosle
"Yamma Yamma Yamma, Tu Parwana, Main Shamma"	Mohammed Rafi, Asha Bhosle
"China Town"	Asha Bhosle

== Box office ==
The film earned an approximate gross of ₹14 million (US$150,000) and a net of ₹7 million (US$73,000). It was declared a "semi-hit" by Box Office India.
