= Halaku (film) =

1956 film

- Directed by: D. D. Kashyap
- Starring: Pran; Ajit; Meena Kumari
- Music by: Shankar-Jaikishan
- Release date: 1956
- Country: India
- Language: Hindi

Halaku is a 1956 Hindi language film with Pran in the title role playing Hulegu Khan.

The cast also includes Ajit, Meena Kumari, Minoo Mumtaz, Raj Mehra, Shammi, Veena in supporting roles.

== Plot ==
Halaku, the powerful emperor of Iran, rules the country wisely and with an iron hand. When he comes upon one of his subjects, Nilofar, he stakes his claim on her and wants her to be his wife, despite his wife opposing his marriage plans. Nilofar, who loves Pervez, refuses to submit to Hulegu Khan. He turns his wrath on both Nilofar, Pervez, and his wife. Will Nilofar and Pervez survive the ruthless Halaku?

== Cast ==
- Pran as Sultan Hulegu Khan
- Ajit as Parvez
- Meena Kumari as Nilofar Nadir
- Minoo Mumtaz
- Raj Mehra
- Sunder
- Shammi: Navbahar
- Veena: Maharani
- Niranjan Sharma
- Helen as Dancer

== Music ==
All music was by Shankar Jaikishan, film songs lyricists were Shailendra and Hasrat Jaipuri.

1. "Use Mil Gayi Nayi Zindagi" - Lata Mangeshkar
2. "Aaja Ke Intizar Me, Jane Ko Hai Bahar Bhi" - Lata Mangeshkar, Mohammed Rafi
3. "Yeh Chand Yeh Sitare Yeh Sath Teraa Mera" - Lata Mangeshkar
4. "Aji Chale Aao, Tumhe Aankho Ne Dil Me Bulaya" - Lata Mangeshkar, Asha Bhosle
5. "Bol Mere Malik Teraa Kya Yahee Hai Insaf" - Lata Mangeshkar
6. "O Sunta Ja, Dil Ka Nagma Pyar Ki Dhun Par" - Lata Mangeshkar
7. "Dil Ka Na Karna Aitbar Koi" - Mohammed Rafi, Lata Mangeshkar
8. "Teri Duniya Se Jate Hain, Chupaye Dil Me Gam Apna" - Lata Mangeshkar
