= Samaj Ko Badal Dalo =

- Poster
- Directed by: V. Madhusudhana Rao
- Written by: Thoppil Bhasi
- Starring: Parikshit Sahni; Sharada
- Cinematography: Tyagraj Pendharkar
- Music by: Ravi
- Production company: Gemini Studios
- Release date: 2 October 1970
- Country: India
- Language: Hindi

Samaj Ko Badal Dalo (transl. Change the Society) is a 1970 Bollywood drama film directed by V. Madhusudhana Rao. The film features Parikshit Sahni, Sharada (reprising her role from the original version and marking her Hindi film debut), Prem Chopra, Pran, Mehmood, Aruna Irani and Kanchana in pivotal roles. It is a remake of the 1968 Malayalam film Thulabharam.

== Plot ==
The film opens with a courtroom scene where a woman is on trial for a heinous crime. She is prosecuted by a female public prosecutor, who recommends the death penalty. When the judge asks her to deliver her final statement, she reveals the motive behind committing the crime.

Chhaya is the only daughter of Satyanarayan, who co-owns a mill in partnership with Daulatram. Chhaya shares a close friendship with Shyam, her fellow college student. Kundanlal serves as the company's private attorney.

One day, Prakash, a young mill worker, along with several labour union representatives, approaches Satyanarayan to request an advance bonus payment for Diwali. Satyanarayan forwards their request to his partner, Daulatram, but Daulatram dismisses it, prioritising profits over the workers' welfare. This decision deeply troubles Satyanarayan.

A heated argument between them leads to the breakup of their partnership. Feeling insulted by the confrontation, Daulatram, with the help of Kundanlal, deceives Satyanarayan and takes over all his property and control of the mill. Unable to bear the shock, Satyanarayan suffers a heart attack and passes away, leaving Chhaya all alone in the world.

Initially, Chhaya seeks shelter with Vimla, but Vimla is unable to help as Kundanlal is her father. Chhaya then approaches Shyam, but he also rejects her request, asking her to forget the friendship they shared during their college days.

Finally, Prakash offers Chhaya his cottage as a place of refuge and invites her to stay with him and his elderly, poor mother, Gomti. Although hesitant at first, Gomti eventually welcomes Chhaya under the difficult circumstances.

Puran and Churan are petty roadside thieves. Prakash guides and enlightens them, after which Puran decides to join the mill as a worker. Prakash and Chhaya continue living happily in the cottage and eventually become parents to three children, whom Gomti lovingly takes care of.

One day, Daulatram introduces a modern machine at the mill and announces the termination of 400 out of the 1,500 workers, a decision strongly opposed by Prakash. During negotiations, Shyam, now the Manager, slaps Prakash, but the situation is defused by police intervention. Under Prakash’s leadership, all the workers decide to go on a hunger strike, which leads to government intervention to resume the mill's operations. However, Daulatram quickly obtains a stay order from the court, bringing the strike to a standstill.

The striking workers begin to starve as days pass. When Daulatram finds the workers gathering at the mill gates becoming increasingly unmanageable, he calls the police for protection and simultaneously hires goons to eliminate Prakash. On a dark evening in a narrow lane, Prakash is attacked by the goons and succumbs to his injuries.

Meanwhile, Chhaya struggles to find a job but fails. Her situation worsens when Gomti is forcibly taken away by her brother, Kalicharan, who confines her with the malicious intent of claiming the cottage in the future. With no one to care for them, Prakash and Chhaya's children begin to suffer from hunger and are forced to beg on the streets.

When Chhaya learns about her children begging, she tries to stop them, but they persist out of desperation. Vendors exploit the children, offering only a fistful of food in exchange for valuable items they unknowingly give away. Matters worsen when a snack shop owner falsely accuses the children of theft and burns the elder girl's hand with a hot rod taken from boiling oil as punishment.

The film returns to the courtroom scene with Chhaya in the witness box, where she narrates her story and the reasons behind committing the heinous crime. She explains that her life has been filled with nothing but deceit. As she faced the prospect of death, she decided to consume poison and also gave it to her children. However, even the poison betrayed her, and she survived while her children died before her eyes. None of the other villainous characters are present in the courtroom.

After narrating her life story, Chhaya collapses in the witness box due to the effects of the poison and later dies in custody. Witnessing the injustice done to Chhaya, the Public Prosecutor, Vimla, who had closely observed Chhaya's entire life, becomes disgusted with the trial. She grows uncomfortable and restless, and, feeling compelled, demands that the court reopens the case. She argues that not only Chhaya but also the people involved in this case should be held guilty and punished.

At the same time, she holds society as a whole responsible for such incidents and demands that it too be held guilty. Vimla urges the court to bring about a change in society's attitude, shouting the slogan that forms the title: Samaj Ko Badal Dalo.

== Cast ==
- Parikshit Sahni as Prakash
- Sharada as Chhaya
- Prem Chopra as Shyam
- Pran as Daulatram
- Mehmood as Puran
- Aruna Irani as Churan
- Kanchana as Vimla
- Nazir Hussain as Satyanarayan
- Kanhaiyalal as Kundanlal
- C. S. Dubey as Kalicharan
- Dhumal as Munshiram
- Ram Avtar as Banarasi Das
- Manmohan Krishna as Kashinath Shukla
- Mukri as Balchand
- Shammi as Gomti
- David as Judge

== Soundtrack ==
The music was composed by Ravi.

Song	Singer
"Samaj Ko Badal Dalo"	Mohammed Rafi
"Taaron Ki Chhaon Mein, Sapnon Ke Gaon Mein"	Mohammed Rafi, Lata Mangeshkar
"Tum Apni Saheli Ko Itna Bata Do"	Mohammed Rafi, Asha Bhosle
"Yeh Mausam, Yeh Khuli Hawa"	Mohammed Rafi, Asha Bhosle
"Hamara Pyara Lal Nishan"	Mohammed Rafi, Manna Dey
"Ab Akele Hi Chalna Padega"	Manna Dey
"Amma Ek Roti De, Baba Ek Roti De"	Lata Mangeshkar, Usha Mangeshkar
"Payal Chham Chham Bole Sakhi"	Asha Bhosle, Usha Mangeshkar
"Taaron Ki Chhaon Mein, Sapnon Ke Gaon Mein"	Lata Mangeshkar
