= Half Ticket (1962 film) =

1962 film

- Film poster
- Directed by: Kalidas
- Written by: Surid Kar; Ramesh Pant
- Produced by: Bombay Talkies
- Starring: Madhubala; Kishore Kumar; Pran
- Edited by: Raj Talwar
- Music by: Salil Chowdhury
- Release date: 19 October 1962
- Running time: 168 min.
- Country: India
- Language: Hindi
- Box office: est. ₹1 crore (est. ₹119 crore as of 2011)

Half Ticket is a 1962 Indian Hindi-language comedy film directed by Kalidas and produced by Bombay Talkies. Starring Madhubala, Kishore Kumar and Pran, the film revolves around Vijay, a good-for-nothing young man who decides to leave his house when his father forces him to get married.

Half Ticket is one of the last films to star Madhubala, as well as her final collaboration with her husband Kishore Kumar. It was a critical and commercial success and has become a cult film since its release. In 2020, The Indian Express listed the film in its "10 Bollywood comedies to watch in your lifetime".

== Plot ==
Vijay (Kishore Kumar) is the good-for-nothing son of a rich industrialist, who becomes bored of his father's constant railing and the efforts to marry him off, with the intention of getting him "settled" in life. So Vijay walks out of his home and decides to leave for Bombay and start life afresh there. However he does not have enough money for a train ticket.

Vijay gets a burst of inspiration from a plump child called Munna, who is waiting in line with his mother (Tun Tun), and decides to pass himself off as a child in order to get the eponymous half-ticket.

Now disguised as Munna, Vijay is used as a mule for a diamond smuggler (Pran) without his knowledge. On the train, Vijay also meets Rajnidevi (Madhubala) and falls in love with her.

The rest of the film follows Vijay's exploits as he avoids capture by the diamond smuggler and his girlfriend (Shammi), romances Rajnidevi while avoiding her auntie-ji (Manorama), and reunites with his father.

== Cast ==
- Madhubala as Rajnidevi / Asha
- Kishore Kumar as Vijaychand vald Lalchand vald Dhyanchand vald Hukumchand alias Munna alias Prannath / Vijay's Mother (Double Role)
- Pran as Notorious Thief Raja Babu aka Chacha
- Shammi as Lily Raja Babu's Mistress
- Manorama as Asha's Aunty
- Pradeep Kumar as Special Appearance
- Moni Chaterjee as Seth Lalchand Vijay's Father
- Tun Tun as the Real Munna's Mother
- Helen as Stage Dancer in the song "Woh Ek Nigah" (Special Appearance)

== Soundtrack ==
Half Ticket

Soundtrack album by Salil Chowdhury
- Released: 1962
- Genre: Feature film soundtrack
- Length: 27:00
- Language: Hindi
- Label: Saregama
- Producer: Salil Chowdhury

Salil Chowdhury chronology
Sapne Suhane (1961)	Half Ticket (1962)	Sunbai (1962)

All lyrics are written by Shailendra; all music is composed by Salil Chowdhury.

Songs
No.	Title	Singer(s)	Length
1.	"Are Le Lo Ji Hai Yeh Dil Ka Heera"	Kishore Kumar	3:35
2.	"Chand Raat Tum Ho Saath"	Kishore Kumar & Lata Mangeshkar	4:03
3.	"Ankhon Mein Tum Dil Mein Tum Ho"	Kishore Kumar & Geeta Dutt	4:09
4.	"Aake Seedhi Lage Dil Pe Jaise"	Kishore Kumar	3:40
5.	"Woh Ek Nigah Kya Mili"	Kishore Kumar & Lata Mangeshkar	4:14
6.	"Chil Chil Chilla Ke"	Kishore Kumar	4:16
7.	"Are Wah Re Mere Malik"	Kishore Kumar	3:15
Total length:			27:00

== Release ==
Half Ticket was released on October 19, 1962.

== Reception ==
=== Box office ===
The film had a box-office gross of ₹1 crore, including nett earnings of ₹0.5 crore. It was the twelfth highest-grossing Indian film of 1962.

In 2011, Box Office magazine calculated its inflation-adjusted gross by comparing the collection with the price of gold in 1962, which gave it an adjusted gross of ₹119 crore.

=== Critical reception ===
A Times of India review, published on 11 March 1962, called Half Ticket a "noisy, farcical comedy".

A 2011 review on the website Filmi Geek stated, "The movie makes a little more sense than that—only a little—but it matters not at all, as Kishore Kumar's limitless zany energy, Madhubala's irresistible charm, and several absolutely superb songs combine to make Half Ticket a delightful and hysterical ride."

In 2013, Sukanya Verma wrote, "Fabulous soundtrack, frolicking premise and frothy dialogues led by the King of Comedy (Kumar) and Queen of vivacity (Madhubala), there is nothing half-hearted about this [film]."

== Legacy ==
Half Ticket is considered an important comedy film made in 1960s Bollywood.
