= Awara Baap =

Indian 1985 Hindi film

- poster
- Directed by: Sohanlal Kanwar
- Written by: Ram Kelkar
- Produced by: Sohanlal Kanwar
- Starring: Rajesh Khanna; Meenakshi Seshadri; Rajan Sippy; Madhuri Dixit; Om Prakash
- Music by: R. D. Burman
- Release date: 29 November 1985
- Country: India
- Language: Hindi

Awara Baap is a 1985 Bollywood film starring Rajesh Khanna in the title role, directed and produced by Sohanlal Kanwar.

== Plot ==
Raj is the only son of the rich man Seth Gopal Das. His childhood and teenage years were very lonely as his mother died when he was a child. He starts drinking in his adulthood and also gradually distances himself from his father. Raj starts living in a palatial bungalow in the same city as his father and occasionally comes to the main bungalow where Seth Gopal Das lives. On a trip to a snowy mountain, Raj meets a girl named Rupa. He protects Rupa from entering into the flesh trade. Then he decides to drop her off at her home, but due to the bad condition of the roads, he is forced to stay in a cottage with her. As the weather becomes cold, Raj develops shivering, and to protect him, Rupa decides to blow air from her mouth into his and embrace him. By doing this, she manages to revive him. In the morning, Raj says she should not have done such a thing for his well-being in the night. Rupa says she was grateful to him as he had saved her from being forced to sell her body, so she didn't mind doing what she eventually did. Hearing this, Raj becomes happy and inquires who she lives with; she says she is alone in that area as she has to send money to her dad in a distant village. Raj asks her whether she would like to stay with him, and then she agrees to join him. Also, while being in love with Raj, Rupa makes him a promise that he won't take to drinking with her in his life. After he reaches his home, he gets to meet Bihari, who has come on his father's orders, to take him to his father's residence, as some guests are going to arrive. Raj agrees to come in the evening for dinner and there he notices that his father has fixed his engagement with another girl. Raj learns that Gopal Das fixed his marriage with the daughter of Jamuna Das, to get a huge amount in the form of a dowry for his son's wedding and he is in dire need of money, due to an incident in which one of his ships, not covered by insurance, sank. Raj disagrees to marry Jamuna Das' daughter. Bihari discloses to Gopal Das that the reason for Raj's refusing to marry the girl of his choice is because Raj has brought a girl to his house and is interested in marrying her. Gopal Das decides to meet Rupa personally and tells her about the financial problem he is in. He explains how Raj's marriage with the girl of his choice would help both him and Raj. Gopal asks Rupa whether she is not more concerned about Raj's welfare, and if she is, then she should not marry him and convince him to marry the other girl.

Rupa convinces Raj to get married, and then, after the wedding, commits suicide. Raj becomes disillusioned but hides the facts about Rupa from his wife. He is sad and angry at his father for doing all this. But keeping with the promise he gave to Rupa, he has a good married life with his wife. His wife soon becomes pregnant and gives birth to a boy. Due to birth complications, she died. Now Raj takes to drinking. Raj also arranges for a statue to be built in memory of Rupa in his bungalow and shifts to the residence of his dad permanently. Gopal, fed up with Raj's drinking behaviour sends the little baby boy to abroad for his schooling and college.

18 years pass by. Raj has started drinking heavily. Meanwhile, one dark night, accidentally due to heavy rains, a girl comes to Raj's residential home for help to stay in his house for one day. Raj observes the girl and realises that she looks the same as Rupa. She calls herself Deepa, and Raj allows her to stay in his house for the night. Deepa leaves his home early in the morning, forgetting her purse. Raj goes to the address mentioned on her card available in the purse, to return it to her. Deepa is a club dancer and earns by performing in that hotel. Raj starts frequenting the hotel more often. This news spreads and reaches Gopal. Although 18 years have passed since Rupa's death, Raj has still not forgiven his father. So Bihari suggests to Gopal that Deepa, being a lookalike of Rupa, should be married off to Raj. So Gopal, to resurrect Raj's boring, lonely life, ask Deepa her consent. But even before he could enter her room, he overhears a conversation between Deepa and her friend about how she has fooled Raj and how Raj has become a frequent visitor to Deepa. After hearing this, he becomes reluctant to marry off Raj to Deepa. But the same day, Gopal dies a sudden death.

Within a few days, Raj's son Vijay returns to India and joins his family business of shipping. Vijay falls in love with Barkha on a business trip to Kashmir. Vijay decides that in the future, he will marry Barkha only. But on realising that his dad is very sad and on learning that Raj is in love with Deepa, Vijay decides to declare a marriage between Deepa and his father, Raj. Deepa agrees to marry Raj only on the condition that she would be declared the owner of all assets of Gopaldas and Vijay's share would be transferred to her. Vijay prefers to think more about his dad's well-being and decides not to claim any right to property in the future. Then the marriage of Raj and Deepa takes place. Deepa starts behaving indifferently with Raj and causes many embarrassing situations for Raj. When Raj questions her as to why she is behaving indecently in the house since the time they were married to each other, Deepa says that Raj has no authority to question her. After a few months, she becomes pregnant and starts pressuring Vijay and tells him that she would not continue with Raj and bring a bad name for the family if Vijay marries off anyone and tries to become a father himself.

== Reception ==
The expectations from the film were high as the director's previous film with Khanna - Paapi Pet Ka Sawaal Hai was a box office hit. But Awara Baap, was not successful film at the box office. The music became popular

== Cast ==
- Rajesh Khanna as Rajkumar Gupta
- Meenakshi Seshadri as Roopa / Deepa
- Rajan Sippy as Vijay
- Madhuri Dixit as Barkha
- Om Prakash as Gopaldas
- Iftekhar as Bihari
- Bharat Bhushan as Ramnath
- Om Shivpuri as Ranjeet Ahuja
- Pinchoo Kapoor as Jamnadas
- Komal Mahuvakar as Sunita
- Paintal as Das Bramhachari

== Music ==
- "Awara Baap Hoon" - Kishore Kumar
- "Awara Baap Hoon" (part 2) - Kishore Kumar
- "Jamuna Ke Jal Mein" - Kishore Kumar
- "Teri Umar Pachaas" - Kishore Kumar, Amit Kumar
- "Na Hoti Dosti Tumse" - Anuradha Paudwal, Suresh Wadkar
- "Dil Ke Dushman Pe" - Asha Bhosle
- "Kori Kori Gagarsi Jawani" - Asha Bhosle
- "Umar Sari Humari" - Amit Kumar, Asha Bhosle
