= Mulzim (1963 film) =

Mulzim is a Hindi romance drama film directed by Nisar Ahmed Ansari starring Pradeep Kumar, Helen and Shakila in lead roles. The film was released in 1963 under the banner of Bundelkhand Films.

== Cast ==
- Pradeep Kumar as Ashok
- Shakila as Asha
- Helen
- Johnny Walker
- Anwar Hussain
- Mumtaz Begum as Ashok Mother
- N.A Ansari as Roy
- Kartar Singh as Sikh man in the police
- Neelofar
- Nasreen
- Champak
- Uma Dutt
- Sagar
- Ratan Gaurang
- Khurshid
- Murray as White Police officer
- Sarang Kumar
- Master Anwar
- Kailash
- Bakshi
- Bihari
- Robert
- Shafi
- Haroon
- Devi Chand
- S.K Chand
- H.Shukla

== Soundtrack ==
Song	Singer
"Main Bajewala Bawa, Na Bhoot, Na Chhalawa"	Mohammed Rafi
"Deewana Kehke Aaj Mujhe Phir Pukariye"	Mohammed Rafi
"Ishqwalon Pe Zamane Ki Nazar Hoti Hai"	Mohammed Rafi
"Kuwaan Paas, Tu Phir Bhi Pyaasa"	Mohammed Rafi
"Sang Sang Rahenge Tumhare" (Sad)	Mohammed Rafi
"Sang Sang Rahenge Tumhare" (Happy)	Mohammed Rafi, Asha Bhosle
"Aate Hi Jawani Ka Mausam"	Asha Bhosle
