= Helen (actress) =

Indian actress and dancer in Hindi films

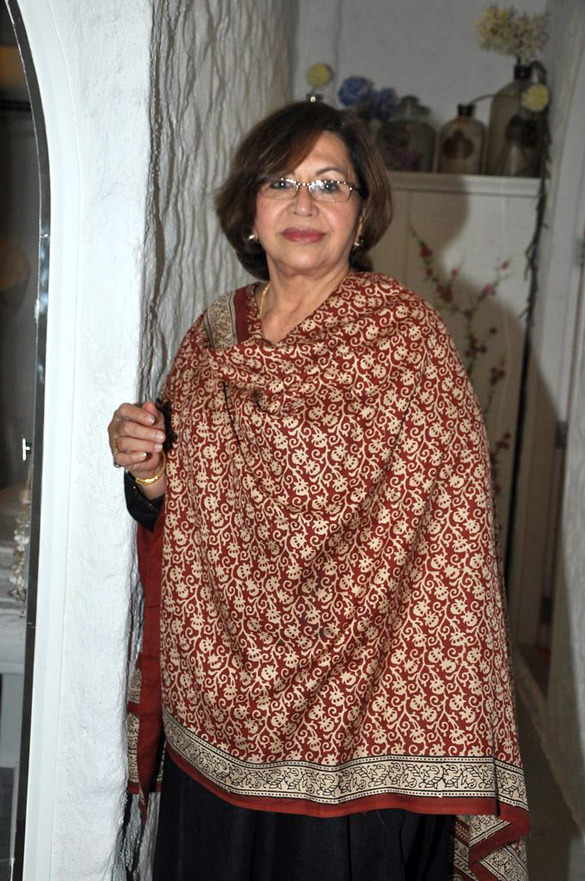
- Helen in 2012
- Born: Helen Ann Richardson; 21 November 1938 (age 88); Rangoon, British Burma (present-day Yangon, Myanmar)
- Occupations: Actress; dancer
- Years active: 1951–present
- Spouses: Prem Narayan Arora (m. 1957; div. 1974) Salim Khan (m. 1981)
- Relatives: See Khan family
- Honours: Padma Shri (2009)

Helen Ann Richardson Khan (née Richardson; born 21 November 1938), known mononymously as Helen, is an Indian actress and dancer. One of the highest-paid dancers of her time, she has appeared in over 750 films, making her a prolific performer in Hindi cinema. Known for her sensual cabaret and nautch performances on screen and glamorous fashion statements, which often incorporated colourful wigs and contact lenses, she is cited in the media as one of the greatest and most popular dancers of India. As an actress, Helen frequently played bold, westernised antagonists in a number of films. In a career spanning over 70 years, she has been called the "Cabaret Queen" of Indian cinema and was awarded the Padma Shri by the Government of India in 2009.

== Early life and background ==
Helen Ann Richardson was born on 21 November 1938 in Rangoon, Burma to an Anglo-Indian father and a Burmese mother. Her father's name was George Desmier and her mother's name was Marlene. She has a brother named Roger and a sister named Jennifer. Their father died during World War II. The family then trekked to Dibrugarh of Assam in 1943 in order to escape from the Japanese occupation of Burma. Helen told Filmfare during an interview in 1964:

...we trekked alternately through wilderness and hundreds of villages, surviving on the generosity of people, for we were penniless, with no food and few clothes. Occasionally, we met British soldiers who provided us with transport, found us refuge and treated our blistered feet and bruised bodies and fed us. By the time we reached Dibrugarh in Assam, our group had been reduced to half. Some had fallen ill and been left behind, some had died of starvation and disease. My mother miscarried along the way. The survivors were admitted to the Dibrugarh hospital for treatment. Mother and I had been virtually reduced to skeletons and my brother's condition was critical. We spent two months in hospital. When we recovered, we moved to Calcutta, and sadly my brother died there due to smallpox".

She left school to support her family because her mother's salary as a nurse was not enough to feed a family of four. In a documentary called Queen of the Nautch girls, Helen said she was 19 years old when she got her big break in Howrah Bridge.

== Career ==
Helen Richardson was introduced to Bollywood when a family friend, an actress known as Cuckoo, helped her find jobs as a group dancer in the films Shabistan (1951) and Awaara (1951). She was soon working regularly and was featured as a solo dancer in films such as Alif Laila (1954) and Hoor-e-Arab (1955). She also featured as Street singer in film Mayurpankh (1954).

Helen got her major break in 1958, aged 19, when she performed on the song "Mera Naam Chin Chin Chu" in Shakti Samanta's film, Howrah Bridge, which was sung by Geeta Dutt. After that, offers started pouring in throughout the 1960s and 1970s. During her initial career, Geeta Dutt sang many songs for her. In the plot of many of the films of this period, Helen performs a song or dance then is killed, leaving the film's "good woman" available for the hero. The Bollywood playback singer Asha Bhosle also frequently sang for Helen, particularly during the 1960s and the early 1970s. She was nominated for the Filmfare Award for Best Supporting Actress in 1965 for her role as Kitty Kelly in Gumnaam. She played dramatic roles in films like China Town and Sachaai (1969) starring Shammi Kapoor which went on to be very successful at the box office. She also played a sensitive character in the film Chhote Sarkar (1974) starring Shammi Kapoor and Sadhana. With Shammi Kapoor, she did many hit dance numbers like 'Suku Suku' in Junglee, ' Yamma Yamma' in China Town, 'O Haseena Zulfonwali' in Teesri Manzil (1966), 'Hai Pyar Ka Hi Naam' in Singapore, and 'Muqabla Humse Na Karo' in Prince (1969).

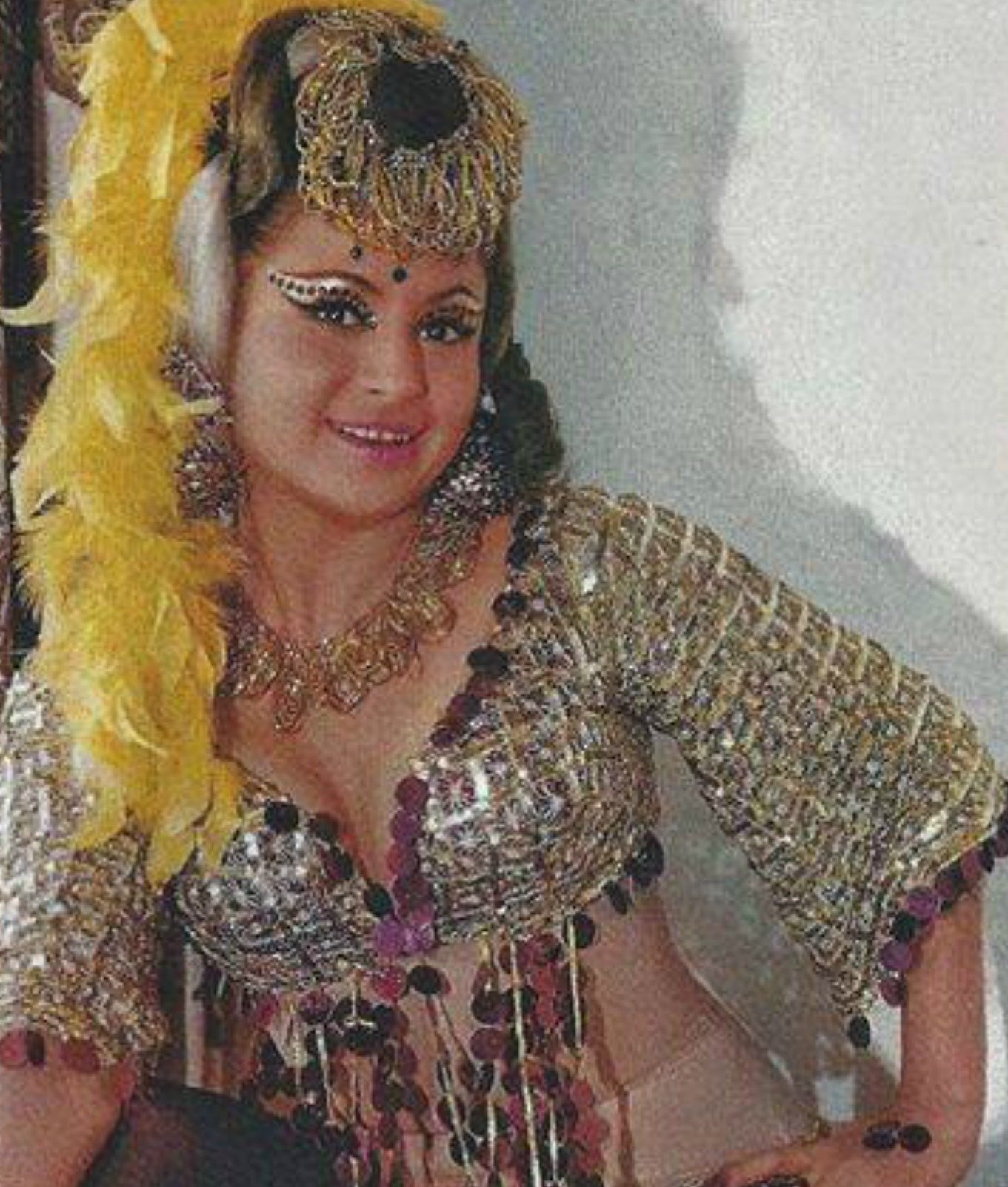
Helen in 1967

Helen performed onstage in London, Paris and Hong Kong. In 1972, she appeared in the Kannada film Bhale Huchcha. In 1973, Helen, Queen of the Nautch Girls, a 30-minute documentary film from Merchant Ivory Films, was released. Anthony Korner directed and narrated the film. A book about Helen was published by Jerry Pinto in 2006, titled The Life and Times of an H-Bomb, which went on to win the National Film Award for Best Book on Cinema in 2007. Writer Salim Khan helped her get roles in some of the films he was co-scripting with Javed Akhtar: Immaan Dharam, Don, Dostana, and Sholay. This was followed by a role in Mahesh Bhatt's film Lahu Ke Do Rang (1979), for which she won the Filmfare Award for Best Supporting Actress. In 1999, Helen was awarded the Filmfare Lifetime Achievement Award.

Helen officially retired from films in 1983, but she has since then appeared in a few guest roles such as Khamoshi: The Musical (1996) and Mohabbatein (2000). She also made a special appearance as the mother of real-life step-son Salman Khan's character in Hum Dil De Chuke Sanam. She also appeared in Humko Deewana Kar Gaye (2006).

Helen was selected for the Padma Shri awards of 2009 along with Aishwarya Rai and Akshay Kumar. She appeared as a judge in the semifinals and finals of India's 2009 Dancing Queen television series.

== Personal life ==
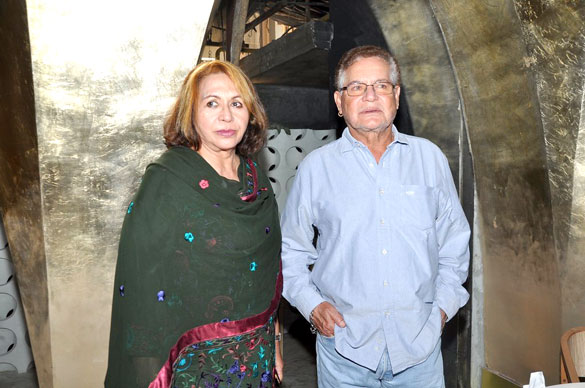
Helen with Salim Khan in 2012

Helen's first marriage was in 1957 to film director Prem Narayan Arora of Dil Daulat Duniya fame, who was 27 years older than her. She divorced him in 1974. In 1981, Helen married Salim Khan, a prominent Bollywood screenplay writer. Khan was already married and the father of four children; Helen joined the Khan family and had a large role (along with Khan and his first wife Salma) in keeping the family united. All of Helen's step-children have bonded closely with her, and Helen is almost invariably accompanied in public appearances by Salma Khan, Salim's first wife. She has adopted a daughter. Helen is a Christian.

== Selected filmography ==
=== Hindi ===
Year	Title	Role	Note(s)
1951	Awaara	Background dancer	
1951	Shabistan	Background dancer	
1953	Alif Laila	Background dancer	
1954	Mayurpankh	street dancer	
1956	Halaku		
1956	Mr. Lambu		
1957	Yahudi Ki Ladki		
1957	Qaidi		
1958	Chalti Ka Naam Gaadi		
1958	Howrah Bridge		
1958	Yahudi		
1959	Sawan		
1959	Anari		
1960	Hum Hindustani		
1960	Abdulla		
1960	Return of Mr. Superman		
1960	Ek Phool Char Kante		
1960	Bahana		
1960	Dil Apna Aur Preet Parai		
1961	Gunga Jumna		
1961	Umar Qaid		
1961	Mr. India		
1961	Sampoorna Ramayana		
1962	Half Ticket	Stage Dancer	Special appearance in the song "Woh Ek Nigah"
1962	Bombay Ka Chor		
1962	China Town	Suzy	
1962	Main Chup Rahungi	Menka	
1963	Sunheri Nagin		
1963	Shikari		
1963	Mulzim		
1963	Taj Mahal		
1964	Aaya Toofan		
1964	Cha Cha Cha		
1964	Woh Kaun Thi?		
1964	Zindagi		
1964	Hercules		
1964	Baghi		
1964	Awara Badal		
1964	Aaya Toofan		
1965	Mohabbat Isko Kahete Hain		
1965	Faisla		
1965	Gumnaam		
1965	Khandan		
1965	Kaajal		
1966	Love and Murder		
1966	Yeh Raat Phir Na Aayegi		
1966	Teesri Manzil		
1966	Dus Lakh		
1967	Bahu Begum		
1967	Dil Ne Pukara		
1967	C.I.D. 909		
1967	Hare Kanch Ki Chooriyan		
1967	Jaal		
1967	Jewel Thief		
1968	Shikar		
1969	Talaash		
1969	Prince		
1969	Bikhre Moti		
1969	Bhai Bahen		
1969	Inteqam		
1969	Aansoo Ban Gaye Phool		
1969	Pyar Ka Sapna		
1970	Pagla Kahin Ka		
1970	The Train		
1970	Tum Haseen Main Jawaan		
1970	Bombay Talkie		
1970	Puraskar		
1971	Caravan	Monica	
1971	Hulchul	Kitty D'Costa	
1971	Hungama		
1971	Adhikar		
1971	Kathputli		
1971	Hum Tum Aur Woh		
1971	Upaasna		
1971	Man Mandir		
1971	Parwana		
1972	Mere Jeevan Saathi		
1972	Doctor X		
1972	Rakhi Aur Hathkadi		
1972	Dil Daulat Duniya		
1972	Apradh		
1972	Do Gaz Zameen Ke Neeche		
1972	Raja Jani		
1972	Dharkan		
1972	Sazaa	Kitty	
1972	Sultana Daku		
1973	Heera		
1973	Anamika		
1973	Aaj Ki Taaza Khabar		
1974	Chhote Sarkaar		
1974	Geetaa Mera Naam		
1974	Benaam		
1974	Madhosh		
1974	Khoon Khoon		
1974	Call Girl (1974 film)	Sylvia	
1975	Sholay		
1975	Zakhmee		
1975	Kaagaz Ki Nao		
1975	Kaala Sona		
1975	Saazish		
1976	Aaj Ka Ye Ghar		
1976	Bairaag		
1976	Ginny Aur Johnny		
1976	Raees		
1977	Immaan Dharam		
1977	Inkaar		
1977	Khoon Pasina		
1977	Pandit Aur Pathan		
1977	Agent Vinod (1977 film)	Lovelina	Special appearance in the song "Loveleena Aa Gaya Mai"
1977	Amar Akbar Anthony	Fake Jenny	
1977	Chala Murari Hero Banne		
1978	Don		
1978	Besharam		
1978	Swarag Narak		
1978	Phandebaaz		
1979	Lahu Ke Do Rang		
1979	The Great Gambler		
1980	Abdullah		
1980	Dostana		
1980	Ram Balram		
1980	Shaan		
1981	Bulundi		
1981	Josh		
1981	Sannata	Ms. Kimmy	
1982	Heeron Ka Chor	Tina	
1982	Sawaal		
1983	Haadsa	Martha	
1983	Film Hi Film		
1985	Bond 303	Lily	
1991	Akayla	Monica	
1996	Khamoshi: The Musical		
1998	Saazish	Aunty Mary	
1999	Hum Dil De Chuke Sanam		
2000	Mohabbatein		
2001	Do Lafzon Ki Kahani (TV series)	Monica	TV series
2002	Shararat		
2004	Dil Ne Jise Apna Kahaa	Dhani's grandmother	
2005	Anjaane: The Unknown		
2006	Humko Deewana Kar Gaye	Kitty Kohli	
2007	Marigold		
2010	Dunno Y... Na Jaane Kyon		
2012	Jodi Breakers	Madonna	
2012	Heroine	Shafguta Rizvi	
2021	Pagli Shaadi Go Dadi		
2026	Brown		Web series;

=== Other languages films ===
Year	Title	Role	Language	Note(s)
1955	Santosham		Telugu	
1957	Dongallo Dora		Telugu	
1958	Bhookailas	Apsara	Telugu	Special appearance in the song Sundaranga Andukora
1958	Uthama Puthiran		Tamil	
1958	Naan Valartha Thangai		Tamil	
1958	Maya Manithan	Item dancer	Tamil	Special appearance in the song Kannukkulle Minnalaadudhu
1959	Gali Thekey Rajpath		Bengali	
1960	Baghdad Thirudan		Tamil	
1963	Ganga Maiyya Tohe Piyari Chadhaibo		Bhojpuri	
1963	Bidesiya		Bhojpuri	
1966	Loha Singh		Bhojpuri	
1966	Chaddian Di Doli		Punjabi	
1970	Rajkumari		Bengali film	
1972	Sange Muzhangu		Tamil	
1972	Bhale Huchcha	Item dancer	Kannada	Special appearance in the sing "Nodu Lovely Beauty"
1979	Allauddinum Albhutha Vilakkum		Tamil/Malayalam	
1979	Hema Hemeelu		Telugu	
1980	Billa	Reena	Tamil	
1982	Aladin dan Lampu Wasiat		Indonesian	
1982	Agent Raaj	Sonia	Bengali	
2011	One Room Kitchen		Marathi	

== Awards and honors ==
- Nominated – Filmfare Award for Best Supporting Actress – Gumnaam (1966)
- Nominated – Filmfare Award for Best Supporting Actress – Shikaar (1969)
- Nominated – Filmfare Award for Best Supporting Actress – Elaan (1972)
- Won – Filmfare Award for Best Supporting Actress – Lahu Ke Do Rang (1980)
- Nominated – Filmfare Award for Best Supporting Actress – Khamoshi: The Musical (1997)
- Filmfare Lifetime Achievement Award (1999)
- Padma Shri, a civilian honour from the Indian government (2009)
- Raj Kapoor Award (2022)

== In popular culture ==
- In Aditya Chopra's 2008 film Rab Ne Bana Di Jodi's song "Phir Milenge Chalte Chalte", Lara Dutta dressed herself as Helen, as a tribute to her look in Teesri Manzil's song "O Haseena Zulfonwali Jane Jahan".

== See also ==
- Desperately Seeking Helen

== Sources ==
- Jerry Pinto (2006). Helen: The Life and Times of an H-Bomb. Penguin Books India. ISBN 978-0-14-303124-6.
