= School Master (1959 film) =

1959 film by B. R. Panthulu

- Poster
- Directed by: B. R. Panthulu
- Written by: Kusumagraj
- Based on: Vaishnavi by Kusumagraj
- Produced by: B. R. Panthulu
- Starring: Karan Dewan; Shakila; B. Saroja Devi; Radha Kishan
- Music by: Vasant Desai
- Production company: A. L. S. Productions
- Release date: 7 August 1959
- Country: India
- Language: Hindi

School Master is a 1959 Indian Hindi film, directed and produced by B. R. Panthulu. The film stars Karan Dewan, Shakila, B. Saroja Devi and Radha Kishan in lead roles. The film had a musical score by Vasant Desai. It is a remake of the 1958 Kannada film of the same name, also directed by Panthulu.

== Plot ==
The film revolves around an old school master and his noble attempt to transform the students of his native village.

== Cast ==
- B. R. Panthulu
- Karan Dewan as Ravi
- Shakila as Geeta
- B. Saroja Devi
- Radha Kishan
- Ullahas
- David
- Jawahar Ravi
- Puranik
- Vishva Mehra
- Raja Gosavi
- Sivaji Ganesan

== Music ==
1. "O Diladaar Bolo Ik Baar Kyaa Meraa Pyaar Pasand Hai Tumhen" – Lata Mangeshkar, Talat Mahmood
2. "Aaj Suno Hum Geet Vida Ka" -Kavi Pradeep
3. "Aao Behan Bhai Aaj Ghadi Aayi" – Lalita, Indu, Sarla
4. "Aaj Andhere Mein Hain Hum Insaan" – Mahendra Kapoor
5. "Taar Taar Baj Raha Dil Ke Sur" – Manna Dey, Lata Mangeshkar
6. "Hello Hello O Meri Chhumak Chhallo" – Geeta Dutt, Mohammed Rafi
7. "Ek Do Teen Gin Bhai Gin" – Aarti Mukherjee
8. "Ae Hawaon Ae Dishaon Batao" – Geeta Dutt, Lata Mangeshkar
9. "Bolo To Bolo To" – Lata Mangeshkar
